= Polish Blitz Chess Championship =

Chess competition

The Polish Blitz Chess Championship is a chess competition held annually in Poland.

== Medal winners Men ==
Lp	Year	Location	I place	II place	III place
1	1966	Łódź	Jacek Bednarski	Romuald Grąbczewski	Włodzimierz Schmidt
2	1967	Wrocław	Włodzimierz Schmidt	Jacek Bednarski	Bogdan Śliwa
3	1968	Kielce	Jacek Bednarski	Włodzimierz Schmidt	Jerzy Lewi
4	1969	Kraków	Włodzimierz Schmidt	Przemysław Ereński	Jacek Bednarski
5	1970	Poznań	Włodzimierz Schmidt	Ryszard Drozd	Jan Adamski
6	1971	Bydgoszcz	Włodzimierz Schmidt	Krzysztof Pytel	Przemysław Ereński
7	1972	Lubliniec	Włodzimierz Schmidt	Jan Adamski	Władysław Schinzel
8	1973	Łódź	Ignacy Nowak	Waldemar Jagodziński	Andrzej Sydor
9	1974	Łódź	Włodzimierz Schmidt	Waldemar Jagodziński	Przemysław Ereński
10	1975	Bydgoszcz	Jan Adamski	Jacek Bielczyk	Jerzy Konikowski
11	1976	Piotrków Tryb.	Aleksander Sznapik	Zbigniew Księski	Włodzimierz Schmidt
12	1977	Częstochowa	Włodzimierz Schmidt	Jacek Bednarski	Waldemar Świć
13	1978	Kalisz	Aleksander Sznapik	Włodzimierz Schmidt	Roman Tomaszewski
14	1979	Kalisz	Włodzimierz Schmidt	Krzysztof Pytel	Jacek Bielczyk
15	1980	Kalisz	Włodzimierz Schmidt	Jerzy Kubień	Waldemar Świć
16	1981	Bydgoszcz	Włodzimierz Schmidt	Andrzej Łuczak	Stanisław Kostyra
17	1982	Katowice	Waldemar Świć	Artur Sygulski	Włodzimierz Schmidt
18	1983	Warsaw	Jan Adamski	Artur Sygulski	Włodzimierz Schmidt
19	1984	Bydgoszcz	Włodzimierz Schmidt	Jan Adamski	Ignacy Nowak
20	1985	Kalisz	Włodzimierz Schmidt	Henryk Dobosz	Jan Adamski
21	1986	Kalisz	Włodzimierz Schmidt	Bogusław Sygulski	Ignacy Nowak
22	1987	Bydgoszcz	Ignacy Nowak	Zbigniew Księski	Jacek Bielczyk
23	1988	Katowice	Włodzimierz Schmidt	Artur Sygulski	Ignacy Nowak
24	1989	Miętne	Stanisław Kostyra	Karol Pinkas	Józef Pietkiewicz
25	1990	Gdynia	Krzysztof Żołnierowicz	Jan Kiedrowicz	Franciszek Borkowski
26	1991	Poznań	Włodzimierz Schmidt	Jacek Gdański	Ignacy Nowak
27	1992	Legnica	Marek Matlak	Waldemar Świć	Włodzimierz Schmidt
28	1993	Kalisz	Tomasz Markowski	Andrzej Maciejewski	Mirosław Grabarczyk
29	1994	Głogów	Mirosław Grabarczyk	Paweł Jaracz	Marek Matlak
30	1995	Racibórz	Aleksander Wojtkiewicz	Tomasz Markowski	Jacek Gdański
31	1996	Łuków	Paweł Jaracz	Marek Oliwa	Klaudiusz Urban
32	1997	Poznań	Włodzimierz Schmidt	Paweł Blehm	Bartosz Soćko
33	1998	Kędzierzyn-Koźle	Jacek Gdański	Bartosz Soćko	Marek Oliwa
34	1999	Łódź	Michał Krasenkow	Paweł Jaracz	Robert Kempiński
35	2000	Żnin	Jacek Gdański	Klaudiusz Urban	Michał Krasenkow
36	2001	Brzeg Dolny	Michał Krasenkow	Bartosz Soćko	Jacek Gdański
	2002	not held			
37	2003	Jaworzno	Paweł Jaracz	Mateusz Bartel	Bartosz Soćko
	2004	not held			
38	2005	Polanica-Zdrój	Marek Matlak	Artur Jakubiec	Stanisław Zawadzki
39	2006	Koszalin	Radosław Wojtaszek	Bartłomiej Macieja	Mateusz Bartel
40	2007	Mielno	Tomasz Warakomski	Kamil Mitoń	Dominik Orzech
41	2008	Racibórz	Jakub Czakon	Dariusz Świercz	Kamil Mitoń
42	2009	Bydgoszcz	Tomasz Markowski	Bartłomiej Heberla	Dominik Orzech
43	2010	Myślibórz	Bartłomiej Heberla	Bartosz Soćko	Wojciech Moranda
44	2011	Katowice	Bartosz Soćko	Dariusz Świercz	Paweł Jaracz
45	2012	Bydgoszcz	Bartosz Soćko	Maciej Klekowski	Grzegorz Gajewski
46	2013	Bydgoszcz	Kacper Piorun	Krzysztof Bulski	Mirosław Grabarczyk
47	2014	Bydgoszcz	Paweł Jaracz	Rafał Antoniewski	Aleksander Miśta
48	2015	Lublin	Bartosz Soćko	Aleksander Miśta	Łukasz Cyborowski
49	2016	Lublin	Łukasz Cyborowski	Zbigniew Pakleza	Bartosz Soćko
50	2017	Piotrków Trybunalski	Wojciech Moranda	Andrei Maksimenko (UKR)	Marcin Tazbir
51	2018	Szczawno-Zdrój	Marcin Sieciechowicz	Kamil Plichta	Piotr Brodowski
52	2019	Katowice	Radosław Wojtaszek	Maciej Klekowski	Igor Janik
53	2020	Trzcianka	Maciej Klekowski	Michał Krasenkow	Igor Janik
	2021	not held			
54	2022	Suwałki	Grzegorz Nasuta	Jakub Kosakowski	Kacper Żochowski
54	2023	Suwałki	Jakub Kosakowski	Krzysztof Jakubowski	Adrian Budzisz
55	2024	Opole	Radosław Psyk	Bartłomiej Niedbała	Zbigniew Pakleza
56	2025	Łochów	Kacper Piorun	Szymon Gumularz	Jakub Kosakowski
57	2026	Łochów	Maciej Klekowski	Grzegorz Nasuta	Igor Kowalski

== Medal winners Women ==
Lp	Year	Location	I place	II place	III place
1	1972	Lubliniec	Lucyna Krawcewicz	Ewa Nagrocka	Gerda Mucha
2	1978	Piotrków Tryb.	Hanna Ereńska-Radzewska	Bożena Sikora	Małgorzata Wiese
3	1979	Kalisz	Hanna Ereńska-Radzewska	Hanna Jagodzińska	Grażyna Szmacińska
4	1980	Kalisz	Hanna Ereńska-Radzewska	Grażyna Szmacińska	Agnieszka Brustman
5	1981	Bydgoszcz	Hanna Ereńska-Radzewska	Grażyna Szmacińska	Agnieszka Brustman
6	1982	Katowice	Agnieszka Brustman	Hanna Ereńska-Radzewska	Grażyna Szmacińska
7	1983	Warsaw	Grażyna Szmacińska	Agnieszka Brustman	Halina Maziarka
8	1984	Bydgoszcz	Agnieszka Brustman	Bożena Sikora-Giżyńska	Dorota Konieczka
9	1985	Kalisz	Hanna Ereńska-Radzewska	Grażyna Szmacińska	Agnieszka Brustman
10	1986	Kalisz	Hanna Ereńska-Radzewska	Grażyna Szmacińska	Liliana Leszner
11	1987	Bydgoszcz	Liliana Leszner	Grażyna Szmacińska	Halina Jałowiec
12	1988	Katowice	Grażyna Szmacińska	Liliana Leszner	Bożena Sikora-Giżyńska
13	1989	Miętne	Hanna Ereńska-Radzewska	Bożena Sikora-Giżyńska	Joanna Strzałka
14	1990	Gdynia	Liliana Leszner	Halina Jałowiec	Danuta Kłusek
15	1991	Poznań	Hanna Ereńska-Radzewska	Joanna Jagodzińska	Grażyna Szmacińska
16	1992	Legnica	Hanna Ereńska-Radzewska	Grażyna Szmacińska	Agnieszka Brustman
17	1993	Kalisz	Olimpia Bartosik	Hanna Ereńska-Radzewska	Barbara Kaczorowska
18	1994	Głogów	Hanna Ereńska-Radzewska	Agnieszka Brustman	Marta Zielińska
19	1995	Konin	Hanna Ereńska-Radzewska	Marta Zielińska	Agnieszka Brustman
20	1996	Łuków	Agnieszka Brustman	Joanna Dworakowska	Hanna Ereńska-Radzewska
21	1997	Poznań	Joanna Dworakowska	Monika Bobrowska	Marta Zielińska
22	1998	Kędzierzyn-Koźle	Monika Bobrowska	Joanna Dworakowska	Hanna Ereńska-Radzewska
23	1999	Łódź	Monika Bobrowska	Agnieszka Brustman	Jolanta Guzik
24	2000	Żnin	Monika Soćko	Dalia Blimke	Katarzyna Jurkiewicz
25	2001	Brzeg Dolny	Monika Soćko	Joanna Dworakowska	Agnieszka Brustman
26	2002	Rybnik	Joanna Dworakowska	Monika Soćko	Beata Kądziołka
27	2003	Rybnik	Monika Soćko	Marta Zielińska	Joanna Dworakowska
	2004	not held			
28	2005	Polanica-Zdrój	Beata Andrejczuk	Karina Szczepkowska	Marta Zielińska
29	2006	Koszalin	Klaudia Kulon	Joanna Majdan	Maria Szymańska
30	2007	Mielno	Joanna Dworakowska	Joanna Majdan	Magdalena Kozak
31	2008	Racibórz	Joanna Worek	Monika Gonsior	Karina Szczepkowska
32	2009	Bydgoszcz	Joanna Worek	Klaudia Kulon	Monika Soćko
33	2010	Myślibórz	Joanna Węglarz	Joanna Worek	Jolanta Guzik
34	2011	Katowice	Joanna Majdan-Gajewska	Marta Michna	Agnieszka Matras-Clement
35	2012	Bydgoszcz	Monika Soćko	Klaudia Kulon	Joanna Worek
36	2013	Bydgoszcz	Monika Soćko	Joanna Worek	Klaudia Kulon
37	2014	Bydgoszcz	Monika Soćko	Karina Szczepkowska-Horowska	Anna Warakomska
38	2015	Lublin	Monika Soćko	Karina Szczepkowska-Horowska	Ewa Harazińska
39	2016	Lublin	Monika Soćko	Klaudia Kulon	Aleksandra Lach
40	2017	Piotrków Trybunalski	Klaudia Kulon	Karina Szczepkowska-Horowska	Joanna Majdan
41	2018	Szczawno-Zdrój	Klaudia Kulon	Paulina Cagara	Wiktoria Cieślak
42	2019	Katowice	Klaudia Kulon	Alicja Śliwicka	Honorata Kucharska
43	2020	Bydgoszcz	Monika Soćko	Karina Cyfka	Klaudia Kulon
	2021	not held			
44	2022	Suwałki	Klaudia Kulon	Monika Soćko	Michalina Rudzińska
44	2023	Suwałki	Klaudia Kulon	Anna Kubicka	Lidia Czarnecka
45	2024	Opole	Aleksandra Maltsevskaya	Klaudia Kulon	Karina Cyfka
46	2025	Łochów	Monika Soćko	Oliwia Kiołbasa	Ewa Barwińska
47	2026	Łochów	Monika Soćko	Michalina Rudzińska	Wiktoria Śmietańska
