= Węglarz =

Węglarz (Polish pronunciation: [ˈvɛŋɡlaʂ]), Węglorz, Wenglarz or Wenglorz is a surname which means "coalman" in Polish. Notable people with the surname include:

- Ewa Węglarz (1949–2015) Polish and German chess master
- Damian Węglarz (born 1996), Polish football player
- Jan Węglarz (born 1947), Polish computer scientist
- Joanna Węglarz (born 1973), Polish chess master
- Krzysztof Węglarz (born 1985), Polish judoka
- Nick Weglarz (born 1987), Canadian baseball player
- Justyn Węglorz (born 1958), Polish basketball player
- Stanisław Wenglorz (born 1950), Polish singer
