= Halina Jałowiec =

Polish chess player

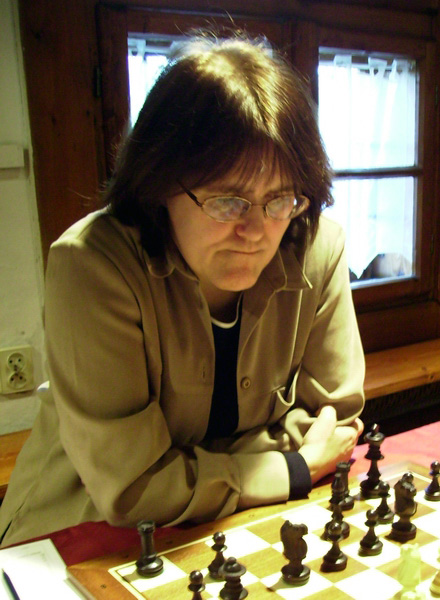
- Halina Jałowiec in 2007

Personal information
- Born: 24 July 1960 (age 65) Pilzno, Poland

Chess career
- Country: Poland
- Title: Woman FIDE Master (1986)
- Peak rating: 2225 (July 1987)

Halina Jałowiec (née Maziarka; born 24 July 1960) is a Polish chess Woman FIDE Master (WFM) (1986).

== Biography ==
Halina Jałowiec is a three-time medalist of the Polish Youth Chess Championships: bronze in 1976 (Toruń, U17 girl's age group), silver in 1979 (Bochnia, U20 girl's age group) and gold in 1980 (Prabuty, U20 girl's age group).

Between 1977 and 1991 Jałowiec participated six times in the Polish Women's Chess Championship finals, winning a silver medal in 1987, in Wrocław.

In 1982, Jałowiec took third place in the international chess tournament in Nałęczów, and in 1985 she was second (behind Bożena Sikora-Giżyńska) in Iwonicz-Zdrój.

Halina Jałowiec has won three medals in the Polish Blitz Chess Championships: one second place (Gdynia 1990) and two third places (Warsaw 1983, Bydgoszcz 1987)).

Halina Jałowiec achieved the highest rating of her career so far on July 1, 1987, with a score of 2225 points, at which point she was ranked in 6th place among Polish female chess players.
