= Żołnierowicz =

Żołnierowicz Is a Polish surname. Russian spelling: Жолнерович, Belarusian: Жаўняровіч, latvian: Žolnerovičs. Notable people with the surname include:

- Bronisław Żołnierowicz (1922–1984, born Edward Lubusch), German-Polish mechanic, known as a "good SS man" in Auschwitz-Birkenau
- Krzysztof Żołnierowicz (18 January 1962 – 27 May 2020) was a Polish chess International Master
- Valērijs Žolnerovičs, Latvian athlete
