= Joanna Strzałka =

Polish chess player (born 1968)

Personal information
- Born: 7 September 1968 (age 57) Knurów, Poland

Chess career
- Country: Poland
- Peak rating: 2170 (January 1987)

Joanna Strzałka (born 7 September 1968) is a Polish chess player.

== Chess career ==
In the 1980s, Joanna Strzałka was one of the top Polish female juniors chess players. In 1983, she won in Katowice the title of Polish Youth Chess Championship in U17 girls age group, and the following year she won in Poznań a bronze medal in this same age group. Joanna Strzałka was also a two-time silver medalist of the Polish Junior Chess Championship (Augustów 1986, Nowy Sącz 1988). She advanced to the individual finals three times Polish Women's Chess Championship: 1986 (Konin – 10th place), 1987 (Wrocław – 12th place) and 1989 (Poznań – 15th place). In 1989, she won a bronze medal in Miętne in Polish Women's Blitz Chess Championship.

Joanna Strzałka represented Poland at the European and World Junior Chess Championships in various girls age groups, in 1984 (Champigny-sur-Marne; U16 World Youth Chess Championship - 5th place), 1986 (Băile Herculane; U20 European Girls' Junior Chess Championship - 5th place and Vilnius; U20 World Girls' Junior Chess Championship - 9th place) and 1987 (Baguio; U20 World Girls' Junior Chess Championship - 7th place).

Joanna Strzałka reached her career highest rating on January 1, 1987, with a score of 2170, and was then 9th - 10th place (together with Barbara Kaczorowska) among Polish female chess players. Since 1993, she has not participated in tournaments classified by FIDE.
