= Jerzy Kubień =

Polish chess player

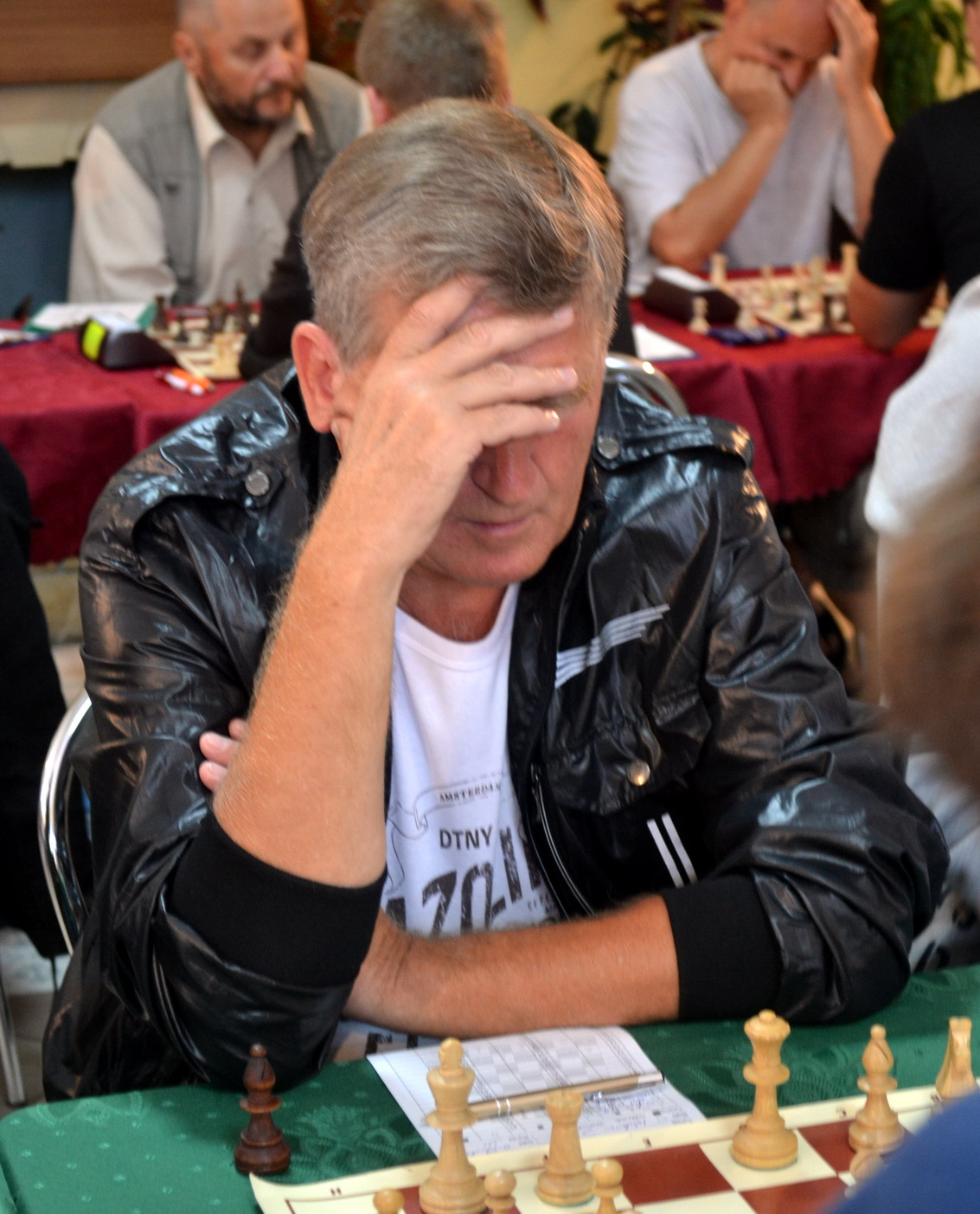
- Jerzy Kubień in 2011

Personal information
- Born: 24 April 1953
- Died: 7 October 2022 (aged 69)

Chess career
- Country: Poland
- Title: FIDE Master (1982)
- Peak rating: 2340 (July 1984)

Jerzy Kubień (24 April 1953 – 7 October 2022) was a Polish chess FIDE Master (1982).

== Chess career ==
In 1971, in Zielona Góra Jerzy Kubień won Polish Junior Chess Championship in U20 age group. In 1977 and 1979 he played twice in Swiss-system tournament finals of the Polish Chess Championships, taking 37th and 49th place respectively. Jerzy Kubień competed many times in the Polish Blitz Chess Championships, achieving the greatest success in 1980 in Kalisz, where he won the silver medal. He participated in Polish Team Chess Championships. In 1991, in Poznań, Jerzy Kubień won the Polish Team Blitz Chess Championship with the chess club AZS Politechnika Wrocław. In 1994, he took 2nd place (behind Robert Kuczyński) in the Blitz Chess Adolf Anderssen memorial in Wrocław, and in 2000 in the next edition of the memorial took 3rd place. In 2004, he won Wrocław Chess Championship.
