= Kamil Plichta =

Polish chess player (born 1990)

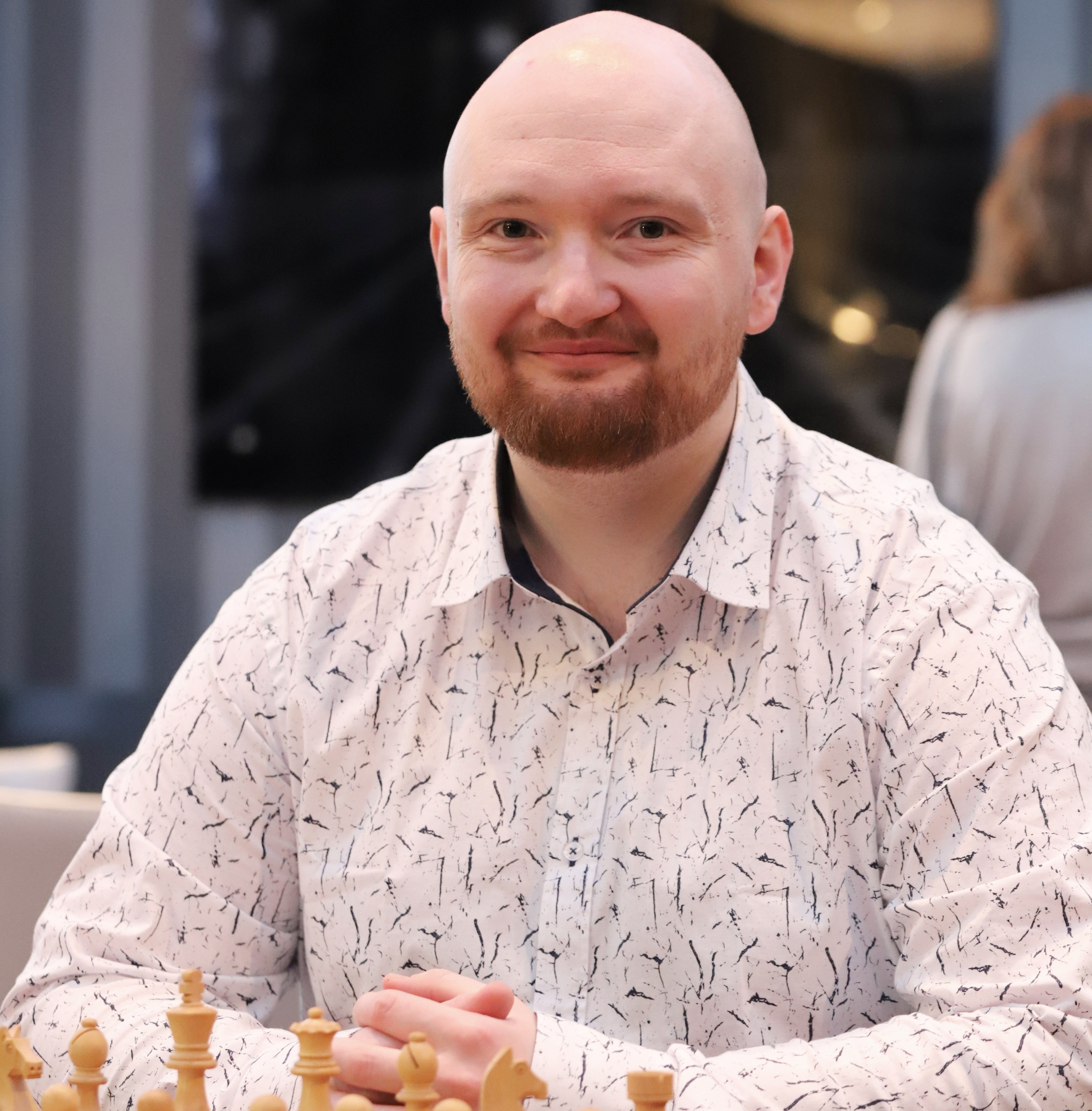
- Kamil Plichta in 2022

Personal information
- Born: 19 July 1990 (age 35) Siedlce, Poland

Chess career
- Country: Poland
- Title: FIDE Master (2014)
- Peak rating: 2401 (November 2023)

Kamil Plichta (born 19 July 1990 in Siedlce) is a Polish chess FIDE Master.

== Chess career ==
In 2014, Plichta ranked in 3rd place in Poznań Chess Festival tournament. In 2017, he won Vasylyshyn Memorial with result 7.5 from 9 and achieving an International Master (IM) norm.

Plichta is particularly strong in Rapid and Blitz Chess. In 2018, in Szczawno-Zdrój Kamil Plichta won the bronze medal of the Polish Blitz Chess Championship. In 2019, in Zgierz he won the bronze medal of the Polish Rapid Chess Championship. Also with chess clubs Biały Król Wisznia Mała and Gostmat 83 Gostynin Kamil Plichta won two medals in Polish Teams Blitz Chess Championships: silver (2018) and bronze (2015).

In November 2022, Plichta beat the World Chess Champion Magnus Carlsen. in the online blitz chess tournament MrDodgy Invitational 3.

Plichta reached the highest rating in his career in November 2023, with a FIDE classical rating of 2401.

Plichta is a prolific author on Chessable. He has won the award for Best Author Support in 2021, 2023 and 2024

== Chessable Publications ==
- Plichta, Kamil (2019). Break the Rules: Play the Trompowsky!. Chessable.
- Plichta, Kamil (2019). Go for The Throat: Play 1.d4. Chessable.
- Plichta, Kamil (2019). Reign Supreme: The King's Indian Attack. Chessable.
- Plichta, Kamil (2019). Too Hot To Handle: The King's Indian Defense. Chessable.
- Plichta, Kamil (2020). Four Horsemen: The Sicilian 4 Knights Defense. Chessable.
- Plichta, Kamil (2020). Anti Anti-Sicilians. Chessable.
- Plichta, Kamil (2020). The Fearsome Budapest Gambit. Chessable.
- Plichta, Kamil (2021). Lifetime Repertoires: Plichta's King's Indian Attack. Chessable.
- Plichta, Kamil (2021). Lifetime Repertoires: Plichta's Accelerated Dragon. Chessable.
- Plichta, Kamil (2022). Secret Blitz Weapons: The Damiano Petroff. Chessable.
- Plichta, Kamil (2022). Lifetime Repertoires: Plichta's French Defense. Chessable.
- Plichta, Kamil (2023). Lifetime Repertoires: Plichta’s 1.d4 - Part 1 Trompowsky. Chessable.
- Plichta, Kamil (2024). Lifetime Repertoires: Plichta’s 1.d4 - Part 2 Queen’s Gambit. Chessable.
- Plichta, Kamil (2024). Chess Olympiad 2024. Chessable.
- Plichta, Kamil (2024). Lifetime Repertoires: English Defense. Chessable.
- Plichta, Kamil (2025). Lifetime Repertoires: Plichta's 1.e4 e5. Chessable.
