= Ewa Harazińska =

Polish chess player (born 1998)

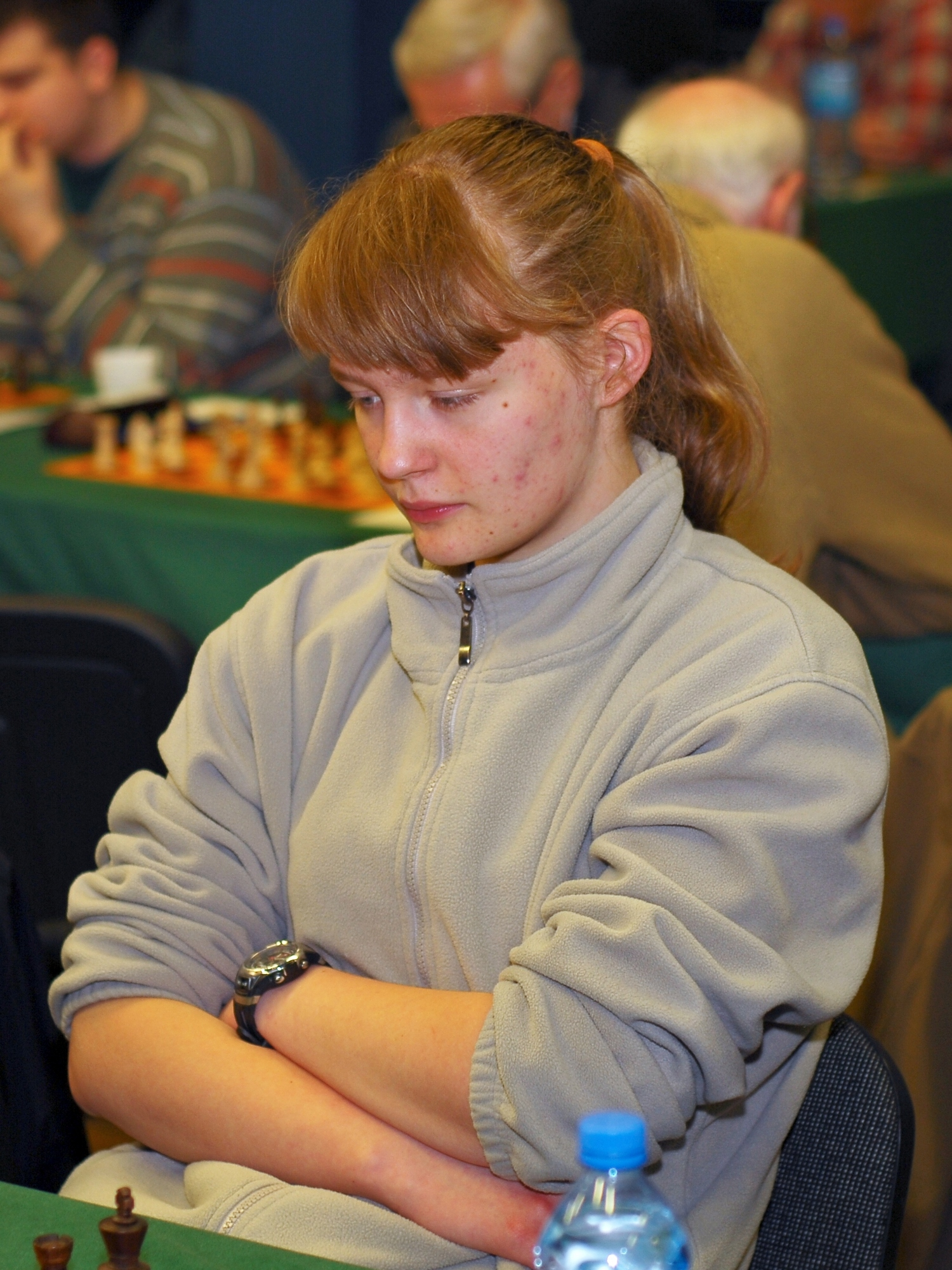
- Ewa Harazińska in 2013

Personal information
- Born: 11 April 1998 (age 28) Warsaw, Poland

Chess career
- Country: Poland
- Title: Woman International Master (2016)
- Peak rating: 2310 (December 2015)

Ewa Harazińska (born 11 April 1998) is a Polish Woman International Master (2016).

== Chess career ==
Ewa Harazińska started playing chess from the age of six. She is a five-time medalist of the individual Polish Youth Chess Championships in classical chess: 2 gold (2008 - U10 girls age group; 2013 - U16 girls age group), silver (2014 - U16 girls age group) and 2 bronze (2012 - U14 girls age group; 2015 - U18 age group). From 2008 to 2015 she participated in European Youth Chess Championships and World Youth Chess Championships and won two medals in European Youth Chess Championships: silver (2015 - girls U18 age group, shared 1st place with Nino Khomeriki) and bronze (2008 - U10 girls age group). In 2014, in Győr Ewa Harazińska won individual silver medal in World Youth U16 Chess Olympiad.

In 2015, in Lublin Ewa Harazińska won the bronze medal of the Polish Women's Blitz Chess Championship. In 2016, in Poznań she appeared in the final tournament of Polish Women's Chess Championship and finishing in 8th place.

Ewa Harazińska reached the highest rating in her career on December 1, 2015, with a score of 2310 points.

She earned a BS in chemistry in 2020 from the University of Maryland, Baltimore County (UMBC), where she played on the chess team. Now she is doctoral student (chemistry) at Johns Hopkins University.
