= Paulina Cagara =

Polish chess player (born 1984)

Personal information
- Born: 15 May 1984 (age 42) Wrocław, Poland

Chess career
- Country: Poland
- Peak rating: 2130 (October 2003)

Paulina Cagara (born May 15, 1984) is a Polish chess player.

== Chess career ==
Paulina Cagara participated six times in the individual Polish Youth Chess Championships in classical chess (1997–2002), winning a gold medal in 2002 in the girls U18 age group. That same year, Cagara participated in the World Youth Chess Championship in the girls U18 age group.

In 2012, playing for a Wrocław chess club,KSz Polonia Wrocław Cagara won team and individual bronze medals in the Polish Women's Team Chess Championship. In 2013, she won a silver medal in the Polish Women's Team Blitz Chess Championship. In 2018, in Szczawno-Zdrój, Cagara won the silver medal at the Polish Women's Blitz Chess Championship.

Cagara reached her highest rating on October 1, 2003, with a score of 2130 points. She is a chess trainer at a Wrocław chess club.KSz Polonia Wrocław
