= Ryszard Drozd =

Polish chess player (1934–2012)

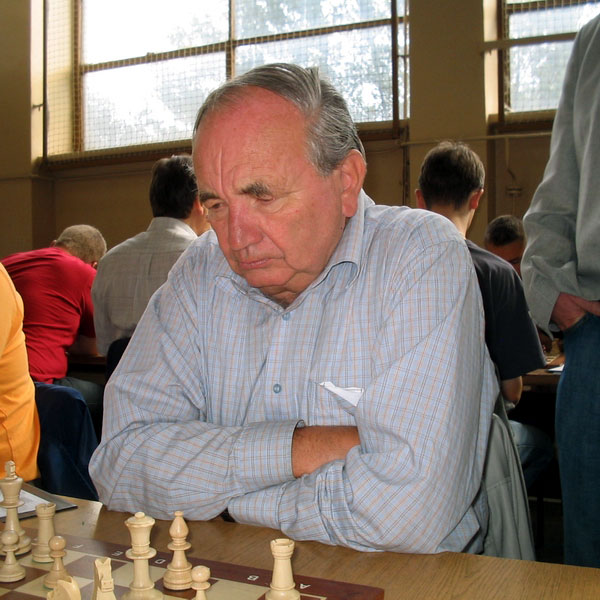
- Ryszard Drozd in 2006

Personal information
- Born: 16 June 1934 Jasło, Poland
- Died: 7 March 2012 (aged 77) Katowice, Poland

Chess career
- Country: Poland
- Title: FIDE Master (1983)
- Peak rating: 2320 (July 1973)

Ryszard Sławomir Drozd (16 June 1934 – 7 March 2012) was a Polish chess FIDE Master (1983).

== Chess career ==
In 1956, Ryszard Drozd won the gold medal for the DWP chess club (Warsaw) in Polish Team Chess Championship. In the 1960s he was one of the top Polish chess players. In 1959, in Łódź Ryszard Drozd made his debut in the final of Polish Chess Championship. Until 1979, he appeared in final tournaments 11 times (1959-1965, 1974–1975, 1977, 1979), winning bronze medals twice: in 1960 in Wrocław and 1961 in Katowice. In 1970, Ryszard Drozd won a silver medal in Poznań in Polish Blitz Chess Championship

Ryszard Drozd played for Poland in the European Team Chess Championship preliminaries:

- In 1961, at eight board in the 2nd European Team Chess Championship preliminaries (+2, =4, -0).

Ryszard Drozd took part in several international chess tournaments in Bad Salzungen (1960), Rostov (1961), Warsaw (1961) and Bucharest (1962), without achieving significant success in tournament victories. In 1961, at a tournament in Rostov, he was very successful, defeating the Soviet Grandmaster, Lev Polugaevsky.

Ryszard Drozd won many times in the Silesia Seniors Chess Championships.

According to the retrospective system Chessmetrics, Ryszard Drozd was the highest ranked in January 1962, then he was ranked 215th in the world.

Ryszard Drozd was buried in the municipal cemetery in Lubliniec.
