= Honorata Kucharska =

Polish chess player (born 2002)

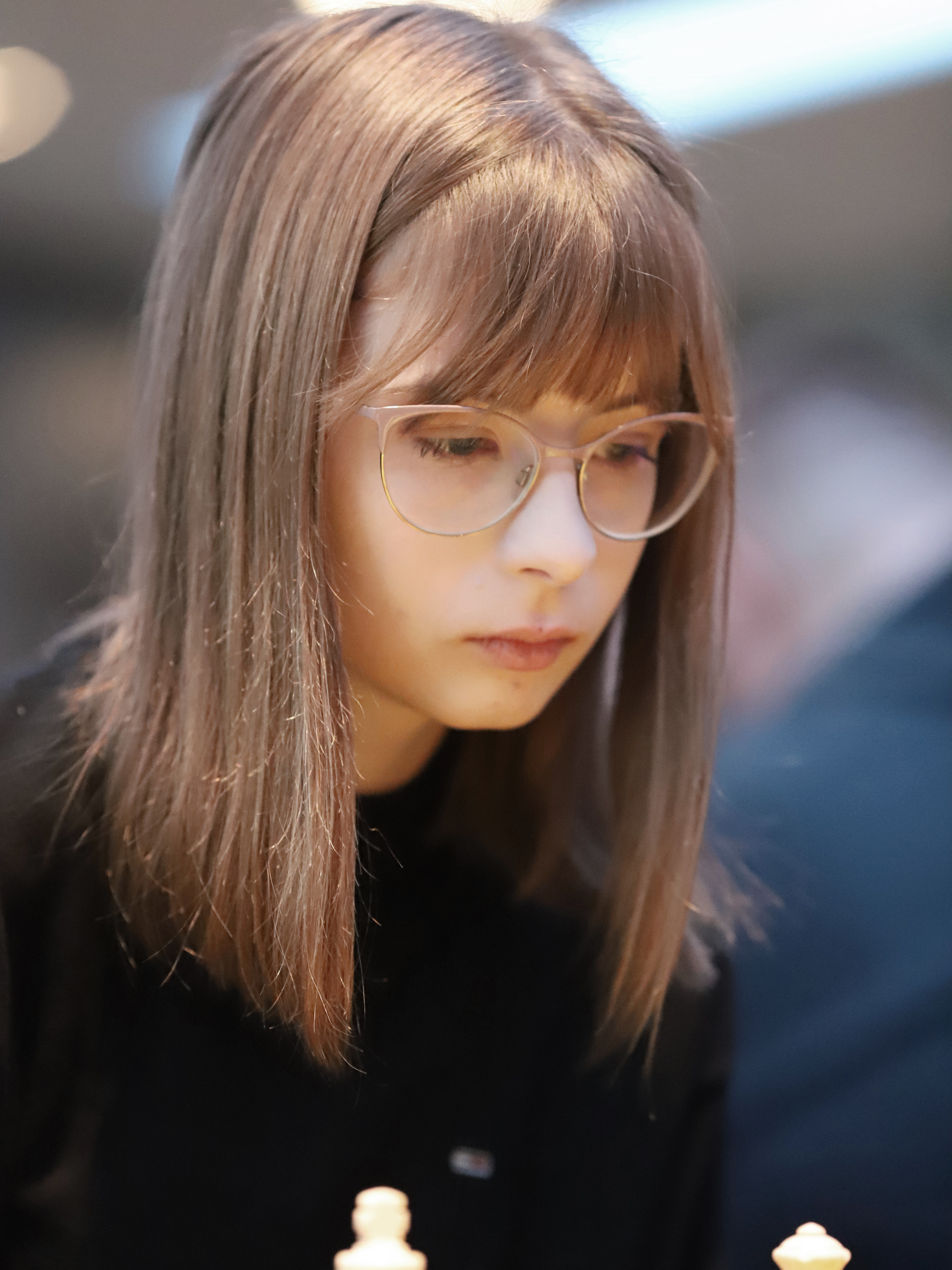
- Honorata Kucharska in 2022

Personal information
- Born: 18 July 2002 (age 23) Jaworzno, Poland

Chess career
- Country: Poland
- Title: Woman FIDE Master (2017)
- Peak rating: 2246 (June 2023)

Honorata Kucharska (born 18 July 2002) is a Polish Woman FIDE Master (2017).

== Chess career ==
Honorata Kucharska is a seven-time medalist of the individual Polish Youth Chess Championships in classical chess: 2 gold (2013 - U12 girls age group; 2014 - U12 girls age group), 2 silver (2012 - U10 girls age group; 2017 - U16 girls age group) and 3 bronze (2010 - U8 girls age group; 2018 - U16 age group; 2019 - U18 age group). In 2020, she won bronze medal in Polish Youth Team Chess Championship with chess club MKSz Rybnik.

From 2010 to 2022 Honorata Kucharska participated in European Youth Chess Championships and World Youth Chess Championships and won silver medal in World Youth Chess Championships in 2018, in Porto Carras in U16 girls age group.

In 2019, in Katowice Honorata Kucharska won the bronze medal of the Polish Women's Blitz Chess Championship. In 2020, in Ostrów Wielkopolski she appeared in the final tournament of Polish Women's Chess Championship and finishing in 8th place. Also she won three medals in Polish Team Blitz Chess Championships: gold (2017) and 2 silver (2018, 2022).

Honorata Kucharska reached the highest rating in her career on June 1, 2023, with a score of 2246 points.
