= Maciej Klekowski =

Polish chess grandmaster (born 1992)

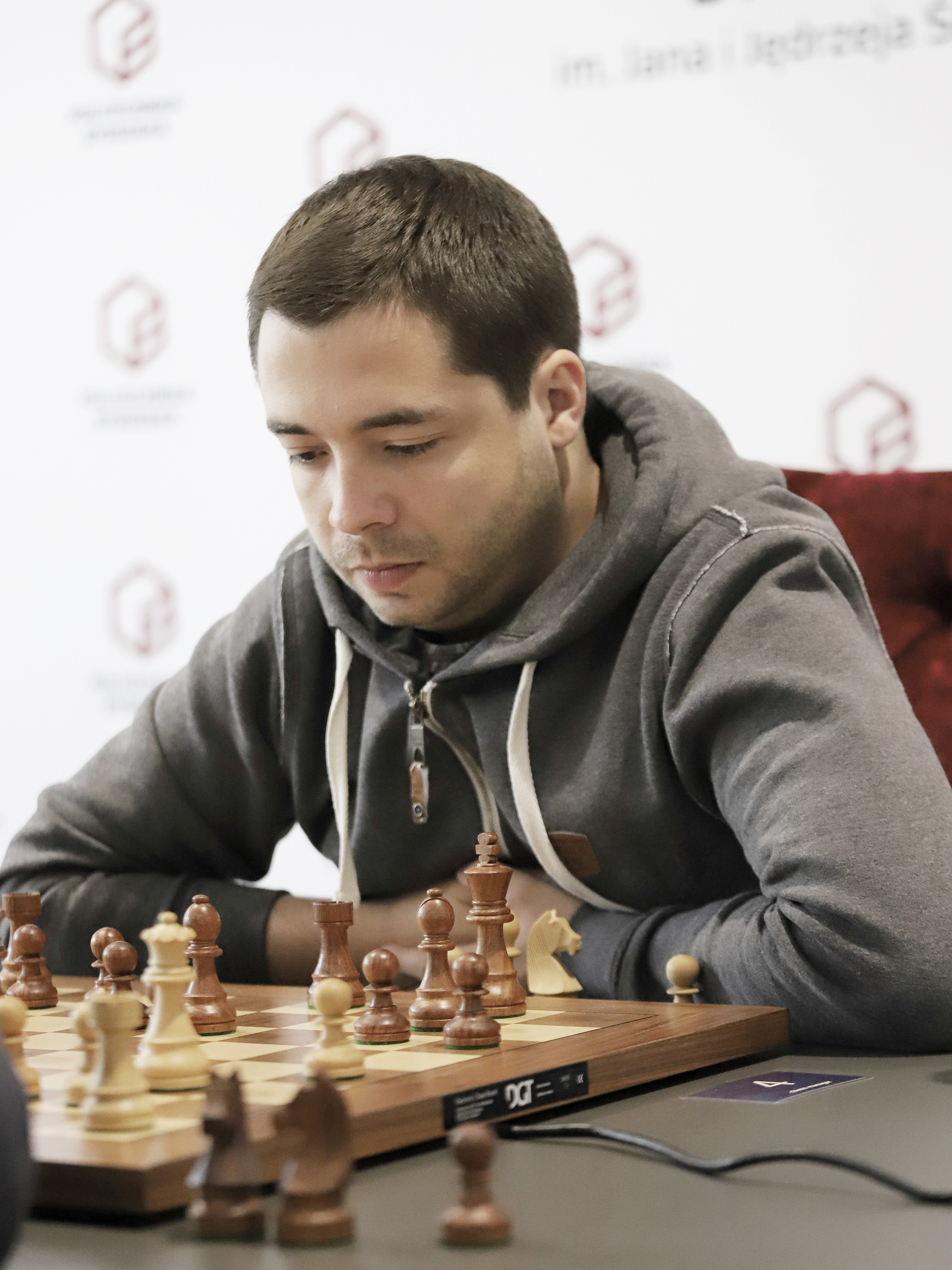
- Maciej Klekowski in 2021

Personal information
- Born: 5 September 1992 (age 33) Częstochowa, Poland

Chess career
- Country: Poland
- Title: Grandmaster (2020)
- FIDE rating: 2470 (July 2026)
- Peak rating: 2515 (January 2020)

Maciej Klekowski (born 5 September 1992) is a Polish chess Grandmaster (GM) (2020).

== Biography ==
Maciej Klekowski took part in the finals of the Polish Youth Chess Championships many times in various age groups. He achieved the greatest success in 2008 in Łeba, where he won the bronze medal in U16 age group. In 2008, he shared second place (behind Mirosław Grabarczyk) in Open chess tournament in Kołobrzeg, he was also a participant in European Youth Chess Championship in U16 age group in Herceg Novi (27th place). In 2011, Maciej Klekowski won two national chess tournaments, held in Tarnowskie Góry and Chorzów. In 2012, he won the first place in the international chess tournament in Kraków, while in Bydgoszcz he won silver medal in the Polish Blitz Chess Championship. In 2019, Maciej Klekowski repeated this success. In 2014, he won the gold medal of the Polish Academic Chess Championship in Katowice.

Maciej Klekowski has participated twice in the Polish Chess Championships, in which he won a silver medal in 2015.

In 2015, Maciej Klekowski was awarded the FIDE International Master (IM) title and received the FIDE Grandmaster (GM) title five years later. He achieved the highest rating in his career so far on January 1, 2015, with a rating of 2515.
