= Krzysztof Bulski =

Polish chess grandmaster (1987–2020)

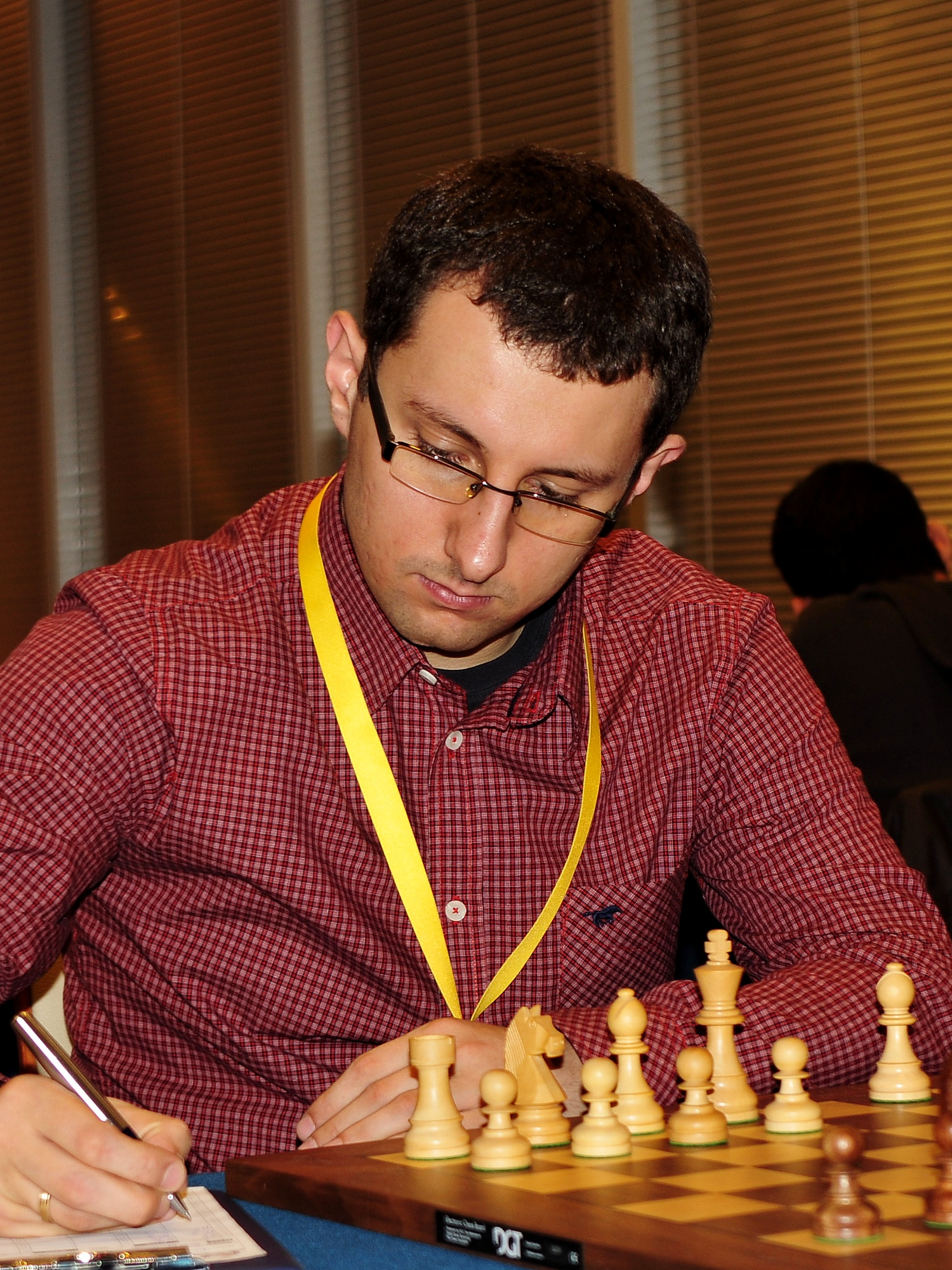
- Bulski in Warsaw, 2013

Personal information
- Born: 12 February 1987 Częstochowa, Poland
- Died: 17 December 2020 (aged 33)

Chess career
- Country: Poland
- Title: Grandmaster (2012)
- Peak rating: 2554 (July 2012)

Krzysztof Bulski (12 February 1987 – 17 December 2020) was a Polish chess player who held the FIDE title of Grandmaster (GM).

== Chess career ==
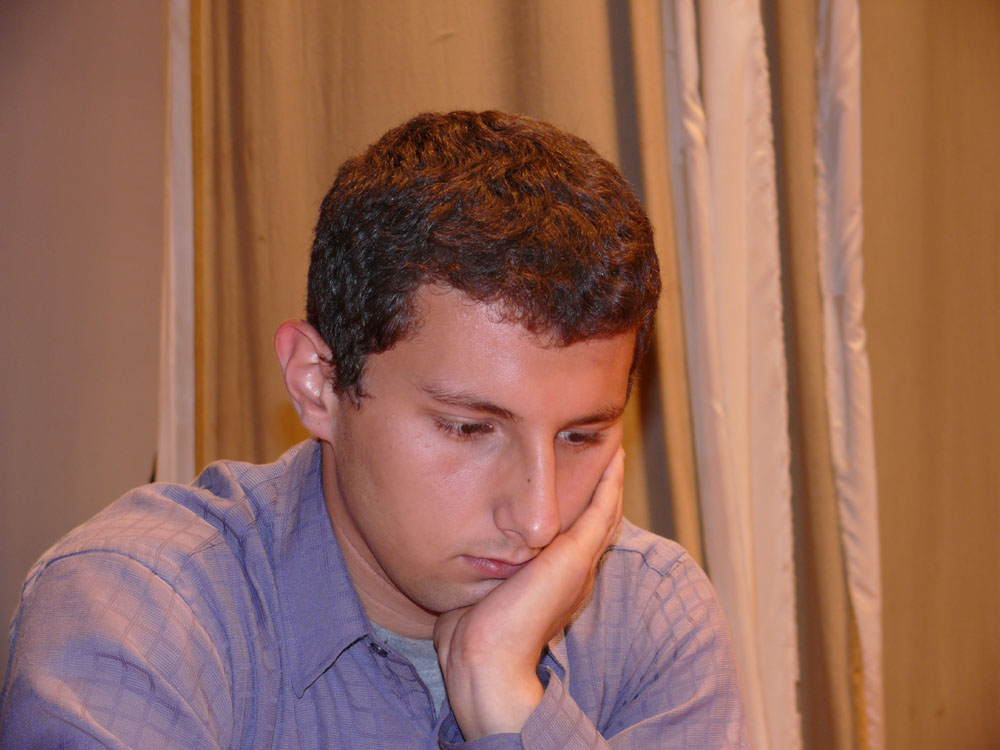
Bulski in Barlinek, 2007

Bulski was born in Częstochowa and learned to play chess at the age of seven. He was a multiple medalist at the Polish junior championships: silver in 2007 (U20) and twice bronze in 2001 (U14), 2006 (U20). In 2007 represented Poland at the World Junior Championship in Yerevan. He has won the Polish Blitz Team Championship on three occasions, in 2007, 2008 and 2009. In 2010 he made his debut in the Polish Championship.

In 2010, he shared first place with Marcin Tazbir in the Polish University Chess Championship in Poznań. In 2011, Bulski finished second in a round-robin tournament in Zaježová, Slovakia. In 2012, he won two silver medals in the World University Chess Championship (individual and team classification) in Guimarães.

His highest FIDE rating of 2554 was achieved in July 2012. He received his Grandmaster title from FIDE in September 2012.

In 2013, Bulski came second in the Polish Blitz Chess Championship in Bydgoszcz. He has also competed successfully in several Polish Team Chess Championships (team gold in 2007, 2013, and silver in 2011, 2012, 2014).

Bulski played for Poland on board three at the 2013 European Team Chess Championship, scoring 5/9 (+2–1=6).

He died on 17 December 2020 at the age of 33.

== FIDE ratings ==
Elo development
View chart definition.
