= Liliana Leszner =

Polish chess player (born 1965)

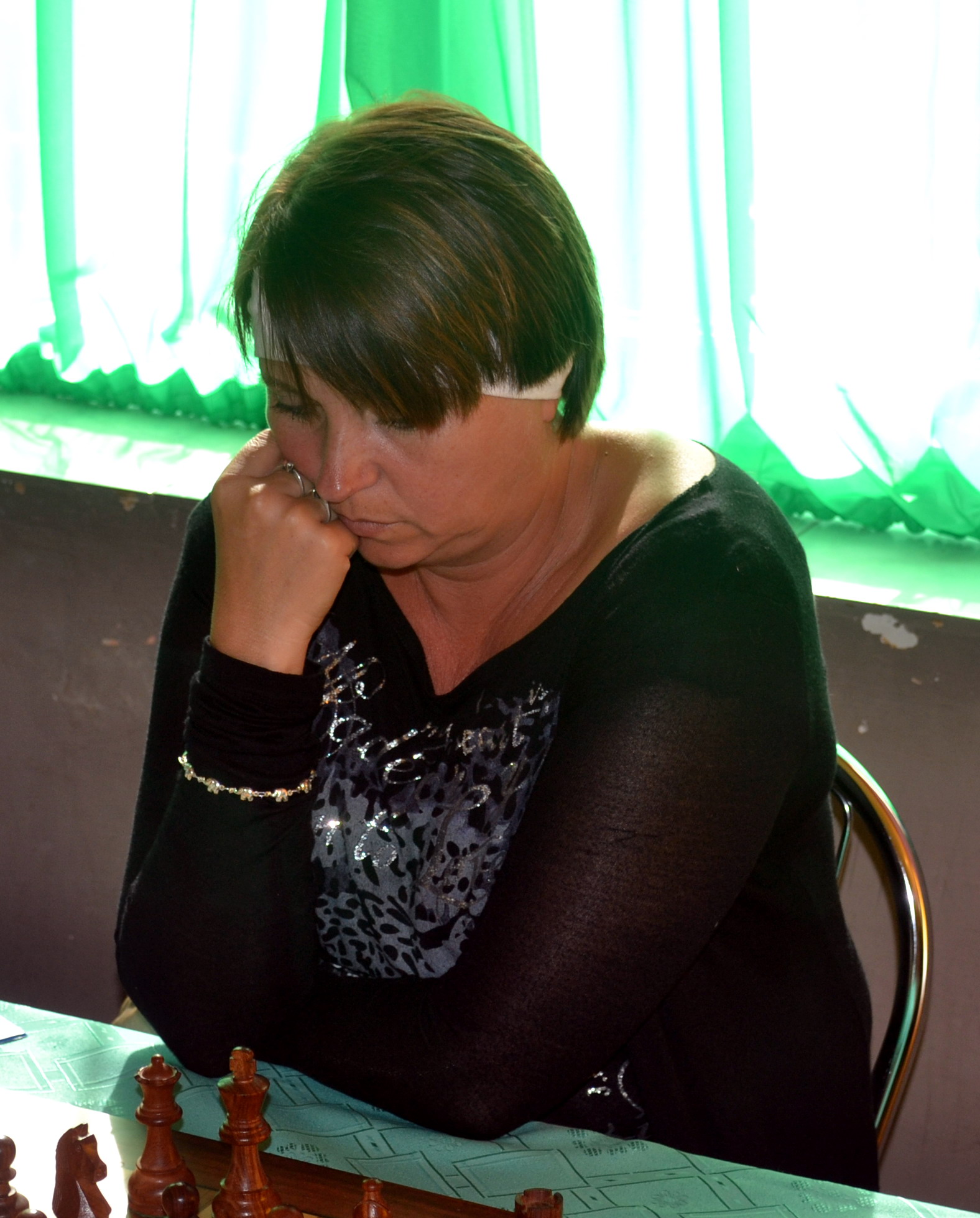
- Liliana Leszner in 2011

Personal information
- Born: 9 February 1965 (age 61) Łódź, Poland

Chess career
- Country: Poland
- Title: Woman International Master (1987)
- Peak rating: 2220 (July 1994)

Liliana Leszner (also Leszner-Bakalarz; born 9 February 1965) is a Polish chess Woman International Master (WIM) (1987).

== Biography ==
Liliana Leszner won the first of four medals in the Polish Youth Chess Championships in 1981 in Pilzno, taking 3rd place in the girls U17 age group. She won the other three medals in the girls U20 age group: two gold (Katowice 1983 and Wrocław 1985) and bronze (Poznań 1984). In 1984, she took second place in the junior chess tournament in Grudziądz. A year later, Liliana Leszner played in Zakopane in the match between Poland and Romania, achieving the best result in the Polish team (4½ points in 5 games). In 1986 she took 4th place in the international chess tournament in Děčín. From 1986 to 1995 Liliana Leszner seven times participated in Polish Women's Chess Championship finals, winning three medals: silver (Gdańsk 1994) and two bronze (Wrocław 1987 and Lublin 1993). In 1995, she represented Poland at the Women's World Chess Championship Zonal tournament in Nadole.

Liliana Leszner won the Polish Blitz Chess Championship twice: in 1987 (in Bydgoszcz) and 1990 (in Gdynia).

Liliana Leszner achieved the highest rating in her career so far on July 1, 1994, with a score of 2220 points, she was shared 7th - 8th place among Polish female chess players.
