= Magdalena Kozak (chess player) =

Polish chess player (born 1988)

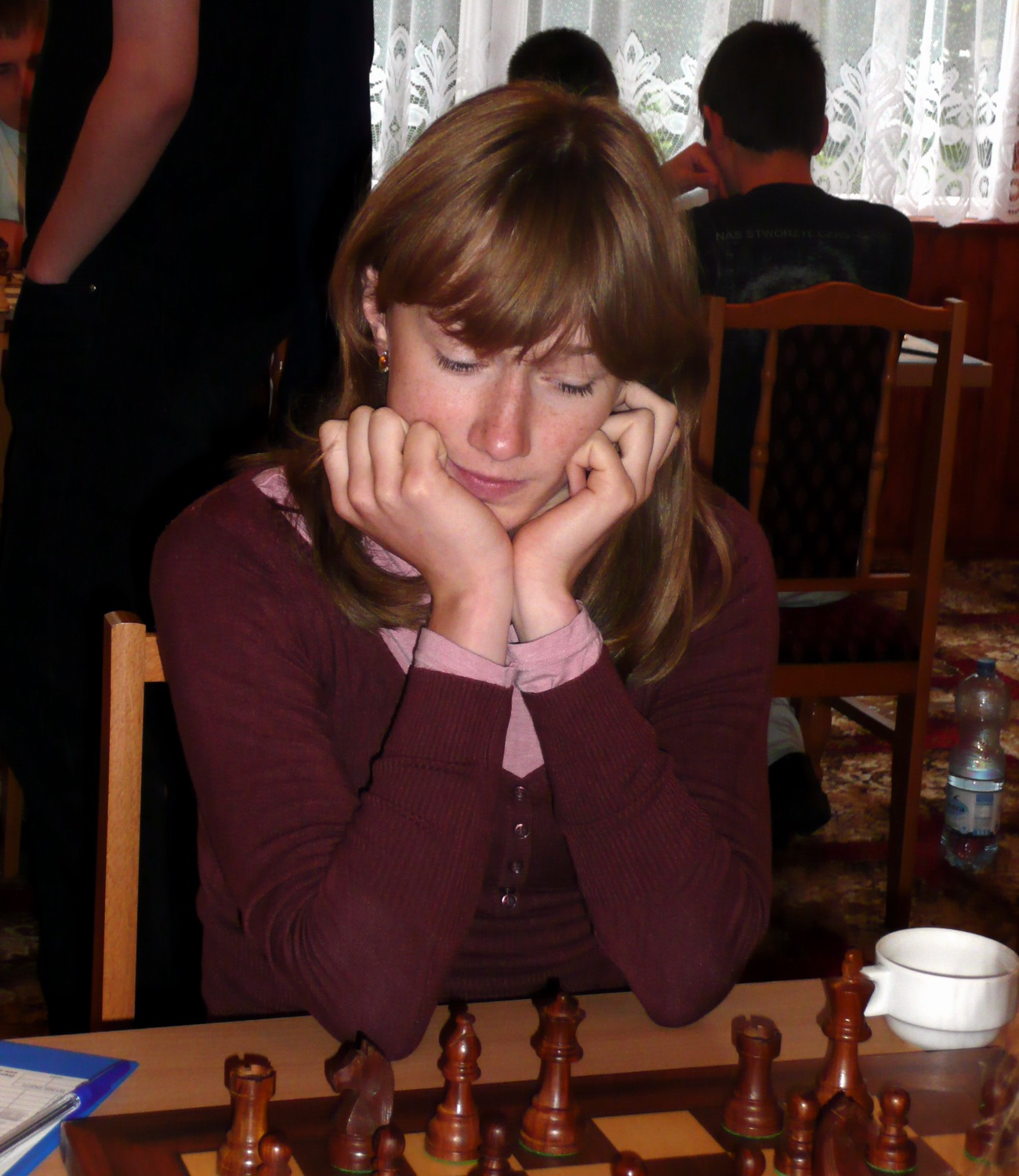
- Magdalena Kozak in 2008

Personal information
- Born: 5 May 1988 (age 38) Suwałki, Poland

Chess career
- Country: Poland
- Title: Woman International Master (2008)
- Peak rating: 2206 (April 2006)

Magdalena Kozak (born 5 May 1988) is a Polish Woman International Master (2008).

== Chess career ==
Magdalena Kozak is a three-time medalist of the individual Polish Youth Chess Championships in classical chess: twice silver (Krynica-Zdrój 2003, U16 girls age group and Łeba 2006, U18 girls age group) and bronze (Kołobrzeg 2000, U12 girls age group). In 2005 (in Suwałki) and 2006 (in Trzebinia) she appeared in the final tournaments of Polish Women's Chess Championship, finishing in 9th place and 8th place respectively. In 2007, in Mielno, she won the bronze medal of the Polish Women's Blitz Chess Championship. She is also a two-time medalist of the Polish Team Blitz Chess Championships: silver (Polanica-Zdrój, 2005) and bronze (Bydgoszcz, 2009). Magdalena Kozak four time participated in Polish Team Chess Championship with chess club KSz Juvena Hańcza Suwałki (2004-2005, 2007–2008). In 2010, in Wrocław she won team bronze and individual silver medals with chess club LKSz Drakon Lublin in Polish Women's Team Chess Championship.

Magdalena Kozak fulfilled the standards for the title of Woman International Master (WIM) in 2005 (at the Polish Women's Chess Championship in Suwałki), 2006 (at Cappelle-la-Grande) and 2007 (at Polish Team Chess Championship in Ustroń).

Magdalena Kozak reached the highest rating in her career on April 1, 2006, with a score of 2206 points, she was ranked 18th among Polish female chess players.
