= Aleksandra Lach =

Polish chess player (born 1995)

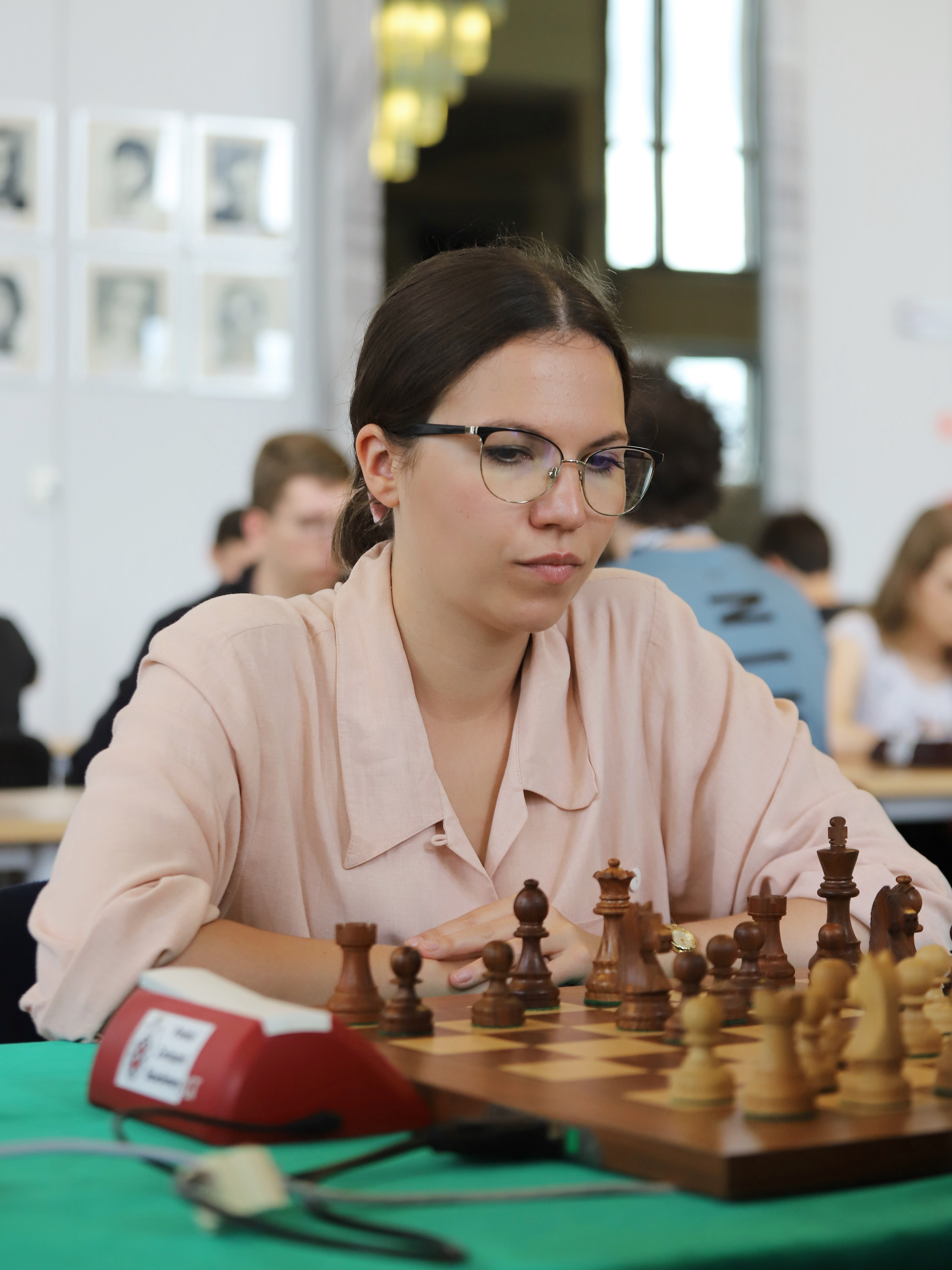
- Lach in 2021

Personal information
- Born: 2 January 1995 (age 31) Olkusz, Poland

Chess career
- Country: Poland
- Title: Woman International Master (2015)
- Peak rating: 2238 (September 2023)

Aleksandra Lach (born 2 January 1995) is a Polish chess player. She earned the FIDE title of Woman International Master (WIM) in 2015.

== Biography ==
Lach many times participated in the Polish Youth Chess Championships in different girls' age groups, where she won seven medals: four gold (2004, 2005 – U10, 2007 – U12, 2012 – U18), silver (2009 – U14) and two bronze (2003 – U10, 2006 – U12).

She repeatedly represented Poland at the European Youth Chess Championships and World Youth Chess Championships in different age groups, where she won six medals: gold (in 2007, at the European Youth Chess Championship in the U12 girls age group), three silver (in 2005, at the World Youth Chess Championship in the U10 girls age group, and in 2008, at the European Youth Chess Championship in the U14 girls age group, and in 2009, at the World Youth Chess Championship in the U14 girls age group) and two bronze (in 2004, at the World Youth Chess Championship in the U10 girls age group, and in 2005, at the European Youth Chess Championship in the U10 girls age group).

Lach twice participated in the European Girls' U18 Team Chess Championships (2010, 2012), where she won gold (2010) and silver (2012) medals in team scoring, as well as gold (2010) and bronze (2012) medals in individual scoring.

She won two medals in Polish Women's Fast Chess Championships: gold (2015) and bronze (2014). Also in 2016, in Lublin Aleksandra Lach won bronze medal in Polish Women's Blitz Chess Championship.
