= Kacper Żochowski =

Polish chess player (born 1996)

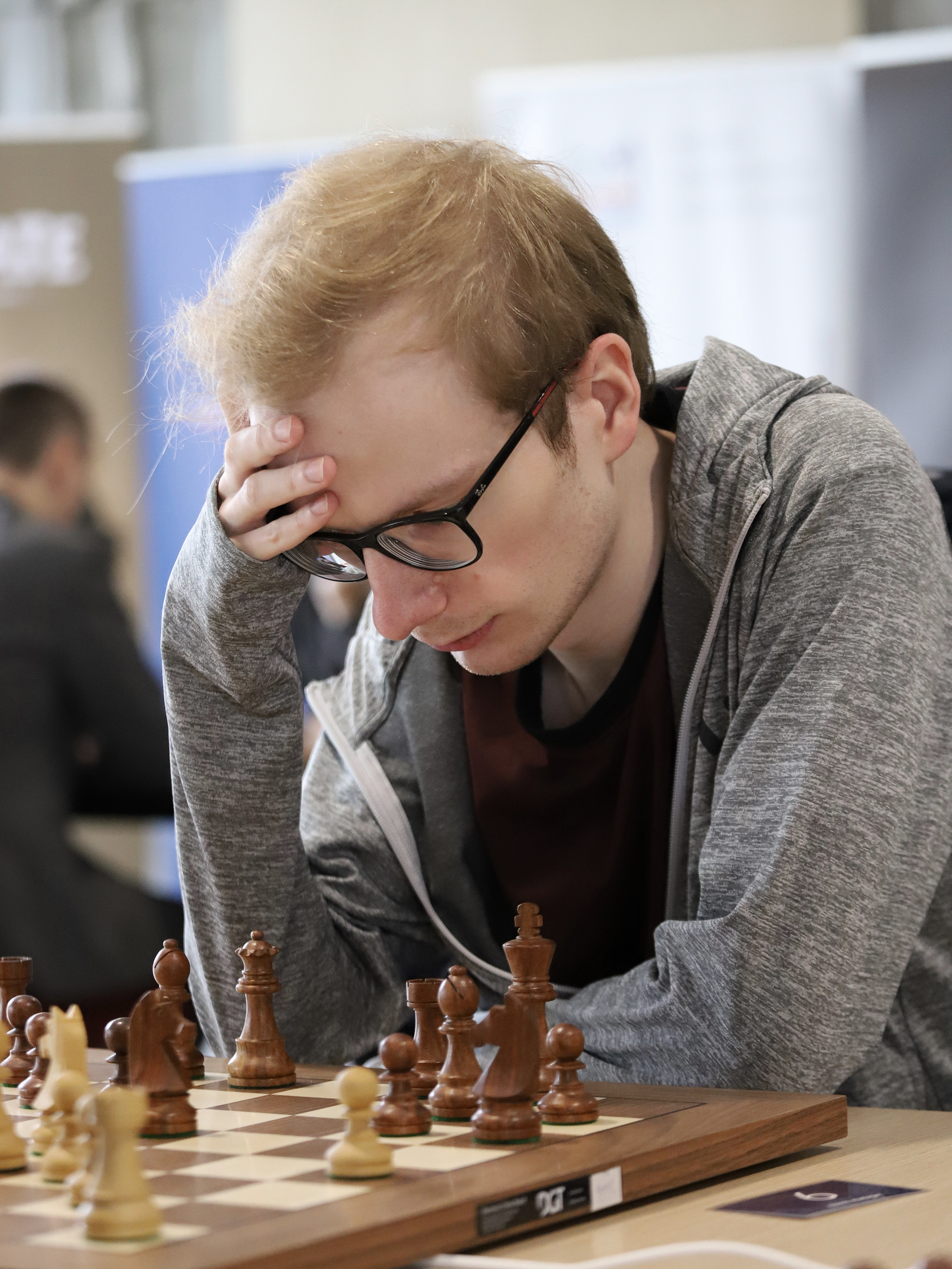
- Kacper Żochowski in 2021

Personal information
- Born: 28 February 1996 (age 30) Białystok, Poland

Chess career
- Country: Poland
- Title: FIDE Master (2019)
- Peak rating: 2313 (October 2019)

Kacper Żochowski (born 28 February 1996) is a Polish chess FIDE Master (2019).

== Chess career ==
Kacper Żochowski eight-time participated in Polish Youth Chess Championships (2007–2014) in various age groups and won bronze medal in 2008 (U12 age group). He with chess club Stoczek 45 Białystok won two medal in Polish Youth Teams Chess Championships: gold (2014) and silver (2013). Also he won silver medal in Polish Youth Team Blitz Chess Championship in 2010 in U14 age group.

In 2004, in Białystok Kacper Żochowski won Zamenhof Chess Memorial D tournament. In 2015, in Warsaw he won Najdorf Memorial B tournament.

In 2022, in Suwałki Kacper Żochowski won the silver medal in the Polish Team Blitz Chess Championship and bronze medal in the Polish Blitz Chess Championship.

Kacper Żochowski reached the highest rating in his career on October 1, 2019, with a score of 2313 points.
