= Waldemar Świć =

Polish chess player (born 1953)

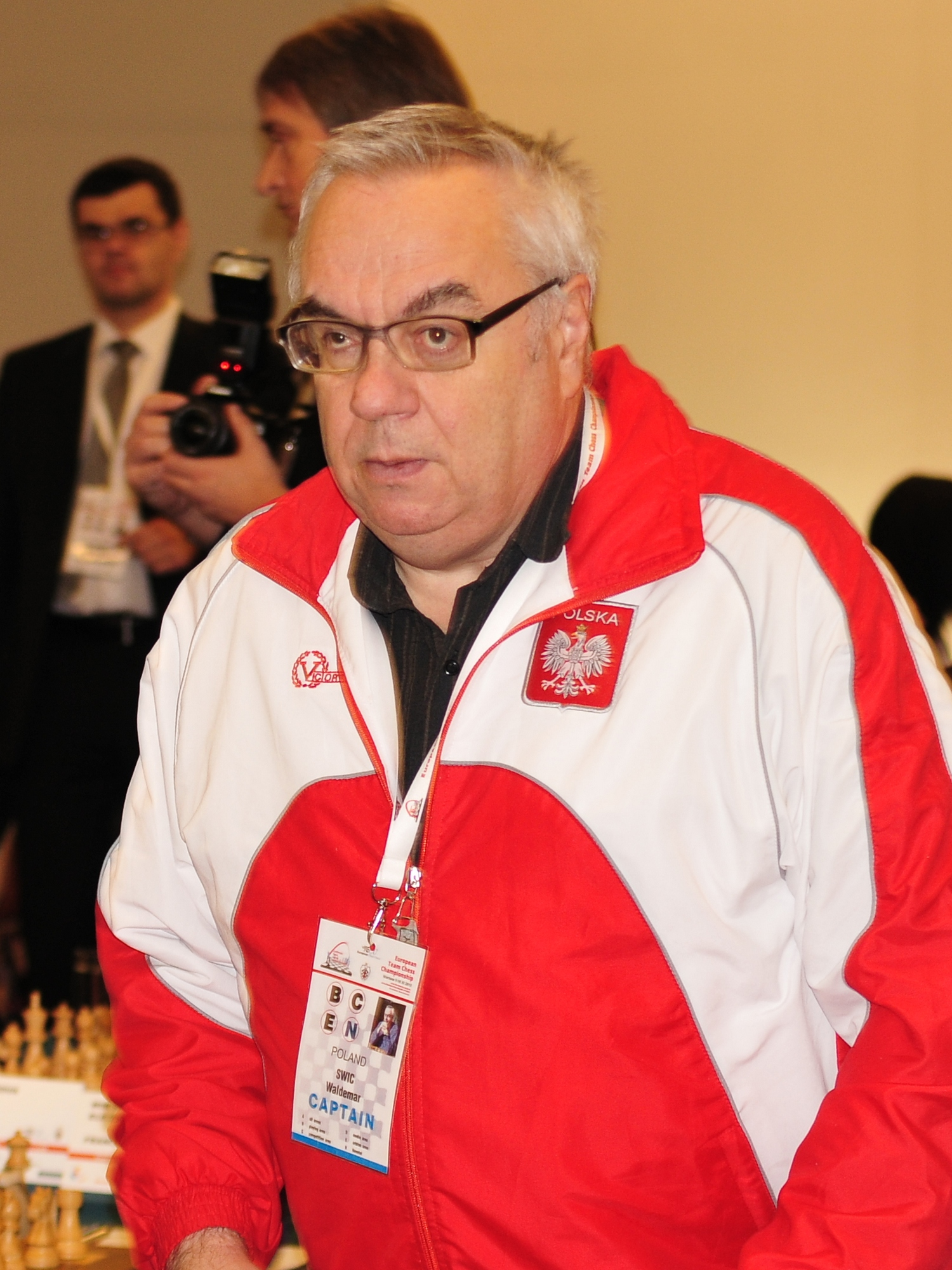
- Waldemar Świć in 2013

Personal information
- Born: 10 March 1953 (age 73) Łódź, Poland

Chess career
- Country: Poland
- Title: FIDE Master (1979)
- Peak rating: 2430 (July 1978)

Waldemar Świć (born 10 March 1953) is a Polish chess FIDE Master (1979).

== Biography ==
In the years 1975–1984 Waldemar Świć participated in the men's Polish Chess Championships seven times, achieving the best result in 1978 in Kraków, where he shared 3rd-5th place (together with Włodzimierz Schmidt and Jan Adamski). He is a four-time medalist of the Polish Blitz Chess Championship: gold (Katowice 1982, after winning the play-off with Artur Sygulski), silver (Legnica 1992) and twice bronze (Częstochowa 1977 and Kalisz 1980).

Waldemar Świć won three medals in Polish Team Chess Championship, all in the colors of the chess club Anilana Łódź: two silver (Ciechocinek 1976, Katowice 1977) and bronze (Augustów 1975). He was also a five-time medalist of Polish Team Blitz Chess Championship: gold (Legnica 1992, in the colors of chess club Hetman Gryfów Śląski, silver (Katowice 1988, Anilana Łódź) and three times bronze (Kalisz 1979, Anilana Łódź; Kalisz 1993, Hetman Gryfów Śląski; Koszalin 2006, Szach-Centrum Cosinus Łódź).

Waldemar Świć played for Poland in the European Team Chess Championship preliminaries:

- In 1980, at reserve board in the 7th European Team Chess Championship preliminaries (+0, =2, -0).

In 1979, Waldemar Świć was one (along with Rafał Marszałek) of two Polish chess players who were the first to receive the title of FIDE Master.

Waldemar Świć reached the highest rating in his career on July 1, 1978, with a score of 2430 points, Waldemar Świć was ranked 5th among Polish chess players.
