= Anna Kubicka =

Polish chess player (born 1999)

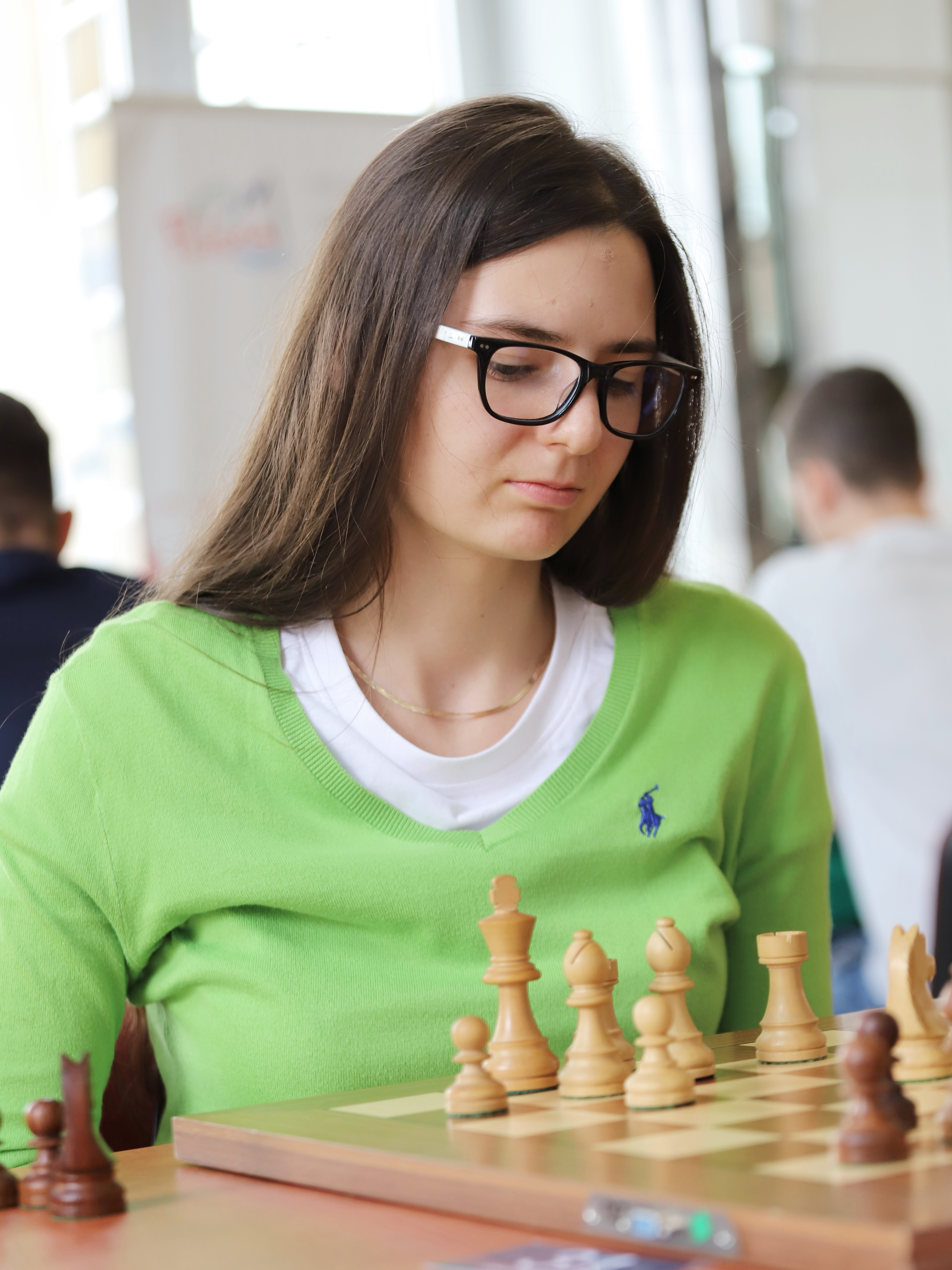
- Anna Kubicka in 2021

Personal information
- Born: 8 June 1999 (age 27) Gliwice, Poland

Chess career
- Country: Poland
- Title: Woman International Master (2018)
- Peak rating: 2334 (June 2024)

Anna Kubicka (born 8 June 1999) is a Polish Woman International Master (2018).

== Chess career ==
Anna Kubicka learned the rules of chess at the age of six. In 2006, she won a bronze medal in Rybnik in Polish Chess Championship for Preschoolers. She has taken part in the finals of the Polish Youth Chess Championships many times in various girls age groups. In 2013, she won the gold medal in the Polish Youth Rapid Chess Championship in U14 age group in Olsztyn. In 2015, she achieved the greatest success in her career to date, winning a gold medal in Polish Youth Chess Championship in U16 age group in classical chess. Kubicka two times participated in European Youth Chess Championships: in 2012 in Prague in G14 age group and in 2013 in Budva in G14 age group. In 2015 she won a bronze medal (together with Alicja Śliwicka) in the European Youth Team Chess Championship.

In 2025, in Riga she won Riga Christmas Chess Festival Women's tournament.

Four times (2018, 2019, 2020 and 2022) she appeared in the individual finals of Polish Women's Chess Championship. In 2023, in Suwałki, Kubicka won the silver medal of the Polish Women's Blitz Chess Championship. Also she won two medals in Polish Women's Rapid Chess Championships: gold (2016) and bronze (2019).

Kubicka reached the highest rating in her career so far on August 1, 2023, with a score of 2284 points.
