= Rafał Antoniewski =

Polish chess grandmaster (born 1980)

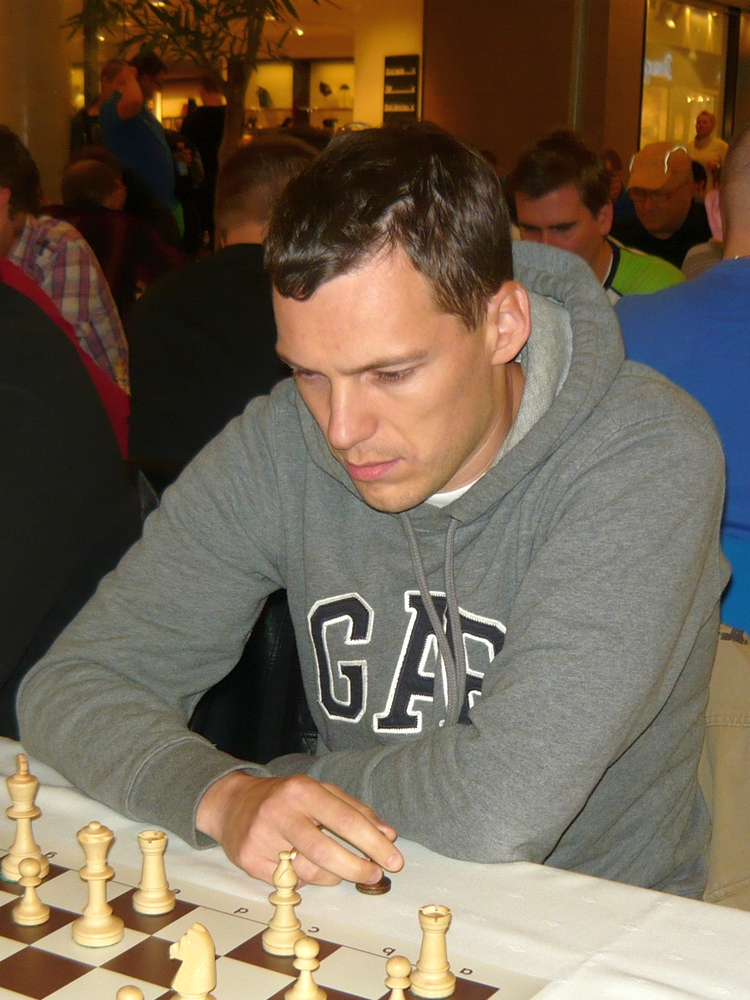
- Antoniewski in 2014 (Bydgoszcz)

Personal information
- Born: 3 December 1980 (age 45) Bielsko-Biała, Poland

Chess career
- Country: Poland
- Title: Grandmaster (2010)
- FIDE rating: 2454 (July 2026)
- Peak rating: 2614 (July 2010)

Rafał Antoniewski (born 3 December 1980) is a Polish chess grandmaster.

== Chess career ==
Rafał Antoniewski was one of the top Polish junior. He is a three-time Polish Junior Chess Championship winner: 1995 (U16), 1996 (U16), and 1997 (U20). Twice took 4th place at the European Youth Chess Championship: 1994 (U14) and 1995 (U16). In 1996 was 12th in the World Junior Chess Championship (U16) in Menorca. In 2005 won Round-robin tournament in Solingen. In 2010 won Liechtenstein Open tournament. In 2014 was second in the Polish Blitz Chess Championship in Bydgoszcz. Rafał Antoniewski has also competed successfully in several Polish Team Chess Championships (team silver in 2002, 2010).
