= Henryk Dobosz =

Polish chess player (born 1953)

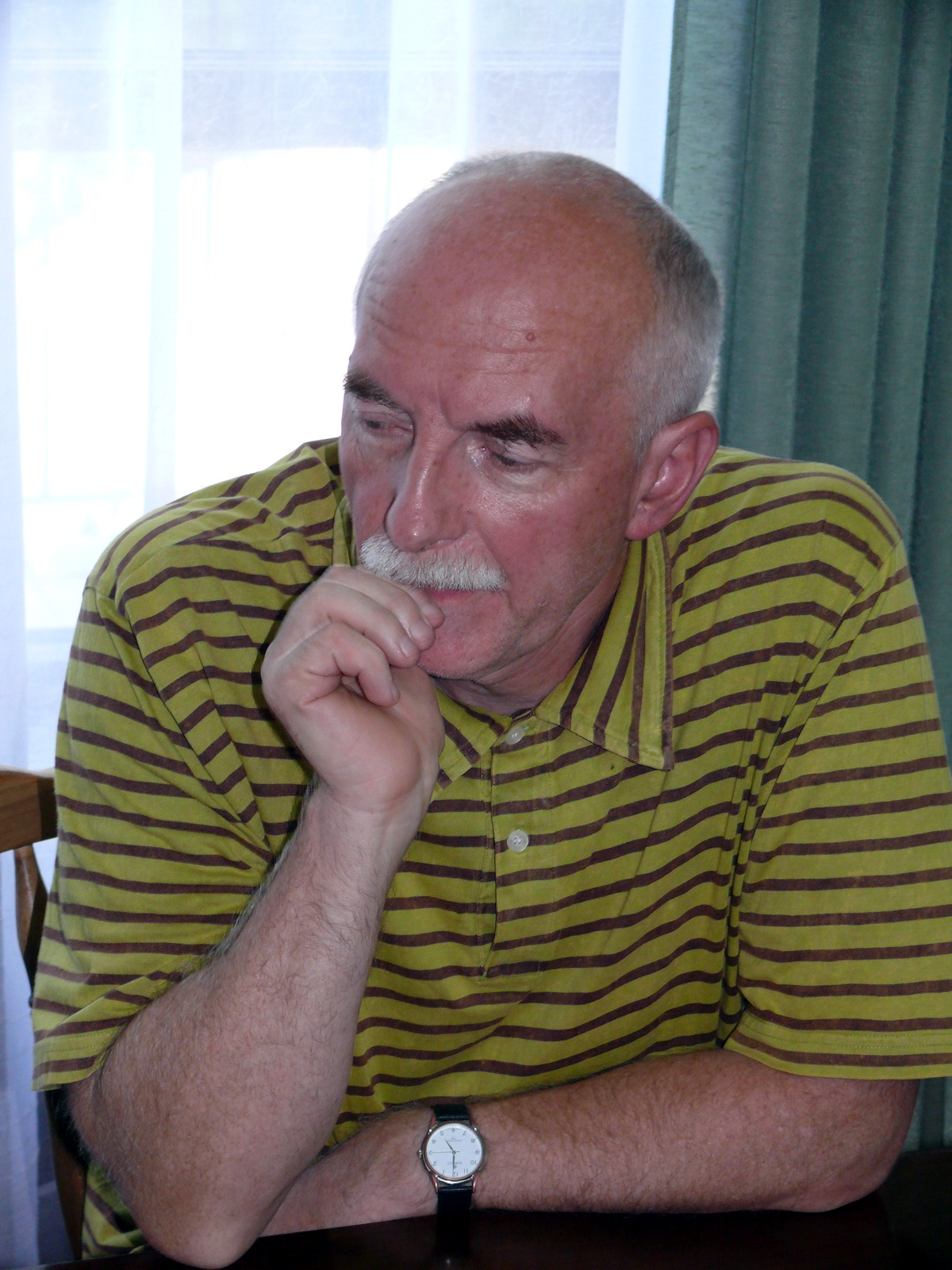
- Henryk Dobosz in 2008

Personal information
- Born: 20 March 1953 (age 73) Lublin, Poland

Chess career
- Country: Poland
- Title: International Master (1978)
- Peak rating: 2465 (July 2003)

Henryk Dobosz (born 20 March 1953) is a Polish chess International Master (1978).

== Chess career ==
From 1976 to 1979 Henryk Dobosz appeared in the finals of Polish Chess Championship three times (all tournaments was swiss-system tournament). He achieved the best result in 1976 in Bydgoszcz, ranked in 4th place. In Polish Team Chess Championship with chess clubs KS Kolejarz Katowice and MKS Start Lublin he won nine medals: gold (1971), 5 silver (1970, 1974, 1982, 1988, 1989) and 3 bronze (1972, 1973, 1987). In 1985, Henryk Dobosz won silver medal in the Polish Blitz Chess Championship. In 1988, he won silver medal in the Polish Rapid Chess Championship.

Henryk Dobosz played for Poland in the World Student Team Chess Championship:

- In 1976, at fourth board in the 21st World Student Team Chess Championship in Caracas (+4, =0, -3).

Henryk Dobosz has participated in national and international chess tournaments many times, achieving successes in:

- 1978 – Słupsk – shared 2nd-3rd place, Rzeszów – ranked 1st place;
- 1981 – Prague – shared 3rd-4th place;
- 1983 – Sopot – shared 1st-2nd place;
- 1995 – Biel (Credis Open) – ranked 1st place;
- 1997 – Götzis – shared 1st-3rd place, Leipzig - shared 2nd-4th place;
- 1998 – Görlitz – ranked 1st place;
- 1999 – Görlitz – shared 2nd-4th place;
- 2002 – Freudenstadt – ranked 1st place;
- 2003 – Triesen – shared 2nd-7th place;
- 2005 – Görlitz – shared 1st-3rd place;
- 2006 – Buchen – ranked 2nd place.

Henryk Dobosz achieved the highest rating in his career on July 1, 2003, with a score of 2465 points, he was ranked 17th among Polish chess players.
