= Olimpia Bartosik-Wiśniewska =

Polish chess player

Personal information
- Born: 8 February 1976 (age 50) Pińczów, Poland

Chess career
- Country: Poland
- Title: Woman FIDE Master (1994)
- Peak rating: 2225 (July 1996)

Olimpia Bartosik-Wiśniewska (née Bartosik, born 8 February 1976) is a Polish chess Woman FIDE Master (1994).

== Chess career ==
In the late 1980s, Olimpia Bartosik was one of the World's leading junior female chess player, winning bronze medals twice at the World Youth Chess Championships in Timișoara (1988, U12 girls age group) and Aguadilla (1989, U14 girls age group). In the years from 1988 to 1996, she won the titles of the Polish Youth Girl's Chess Championship five times in the age groups up to 12, 16, 18 and 20 years old. Between 1992 and 1997, she appeared in the finals of Polish Women's Chess Championships three times, achieving the best result in 1992 in Świeradów-Zdrój, where she took 11th place. In 1993, in Kalisz, Olimpia Bartosik won the Polish Women's Blitz Chess Championship. In 1997, she ended her active professional chess career.

Olimpia Bartosik-Wiśniewska achieved the highest rating in her career on July 1, 1996, with a score of 2225 points, she was then ranked 8th among Polish female chess players.

Currently, Olimpia Bartosik-Wiśniewska works as a teacher physical education in Junior High School No. 1 in Raszyn.
