= Beata Andrejczuk-Dudzińska =

Polish chess player (1988–2026)

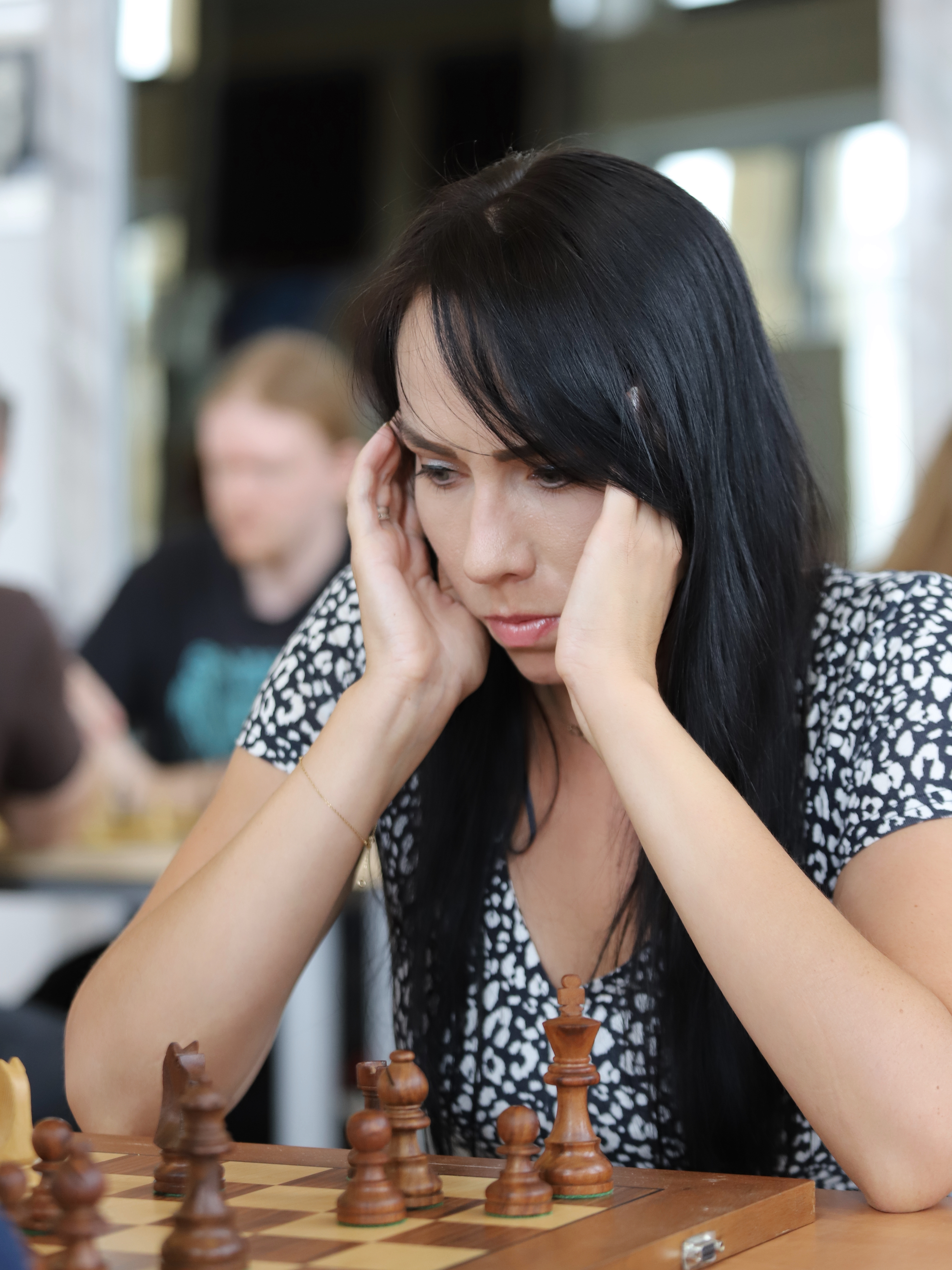
- Andrejczuk-Dudzińska in 2021

Personal information
- Born: 22 June 1988 Białystok, Poland
- Died: 24 June 2026 (aged 38)

Chess career
- Country: Poland
- Title: Woman FIDE Master (2006)
- Peak rating: 2173 (April 2008)

Beata Andrejczuk-Dudzińska (née Andrejczuk; 22 June 1988 – 24 June 2026) was a Polish chess Woman FIDE Master (WFM) (2006).

== Biography ==
During 1998 to 2000, Andrejczuk represented Poland three times in the World Youth Chess Championships in the girl's U10 and U12 age groups and in the European Youth Chess Championship in the girl's U10 age group. She is a three-time medalist of the Polish Youth Chess Championships: in 1998 won in Krynica Morska a silver medal in the girl's U10 age group, in 2000 in Kołobrzeg - a gold medal in the girl's U12 age group, while in 2004 in Łeba - a bronze medal in the girl's U16 age group. In 2005, in Polanica-Zdrój, she won the gold medal in Polish Blitz Chess Championship.

Andrejczuk-Dudzińska reached the highest rating in her career so far on 1 April 2008, with a score of 2173 points, she was ranked 28th among Polish female chess players. She was a FIDE National Arbiter (2018).

Andrejczuk-Dudzińska died on 24 June 2026, at the age of 38, a few hours after being hospitalised. Her cause of death was suspected to be an aortic dissection.
