= Roman Tomaszewski =

Polish chess player (born 1960)

Personal information
- Born: 16 May 1960 (age 66) Częstochowa, Poland

Chess career
- Country: Poland
- Title: International Master (1984)
- Peak rating: 2435 (January 1979)

Roman Tomaszewski (born 16 May 1960) is a Polish chess International Master (1984).

== Chess career ==
In 1977 Roman Tomaszewski won the Polish Youth Chess Championship in U18 age group. In 1978 he won the international chess tournament in Jelenia Góra, won the bronze medal Polish Blitz Chess Championship and represented Poland at the World Junior Chess Championship in Graz.

Roman Tomaszewski played for Poland in the World Youth U26 Team Chess Championship:

- In 1981, at third board in the 3rd World Youth U26 Team Chess Championship in Graz (+1, =5, -3).

In the mid 1980s Roman Tomaszewski was one of the top Polish chess players, which he confirmed in Polish Chess Championship in Wrocław, winning the title of vice-champion of Poland (tournament won Robert Kuczyński). In total (in the years 1979–1988) he appeared six times in the final tournaments of national chess championship. He performed twice (in 1980 and 1987) in memorials Akiba Rubinstein in Polanica-Zdrój. In 1983, he won the silver medal in Polish Team Chess Championship, he was also a three-time medalist Polish Team Blitz Championship (gold - 1982 and bronze twice - 1983, 1984), winning all team medals with chess club KS Skra Częstochowa.

Roman Tomaszewski reached his career highest rating on January 1, 1979, with a score of 2435, and was then 3rd-4th place among Polish chess players.

From 1991, he significantly reduced his tournament activity, practically only appearing in team competitions in Germany and Poland.
