= Dalia Blimke-Dereń =

Polish chess player

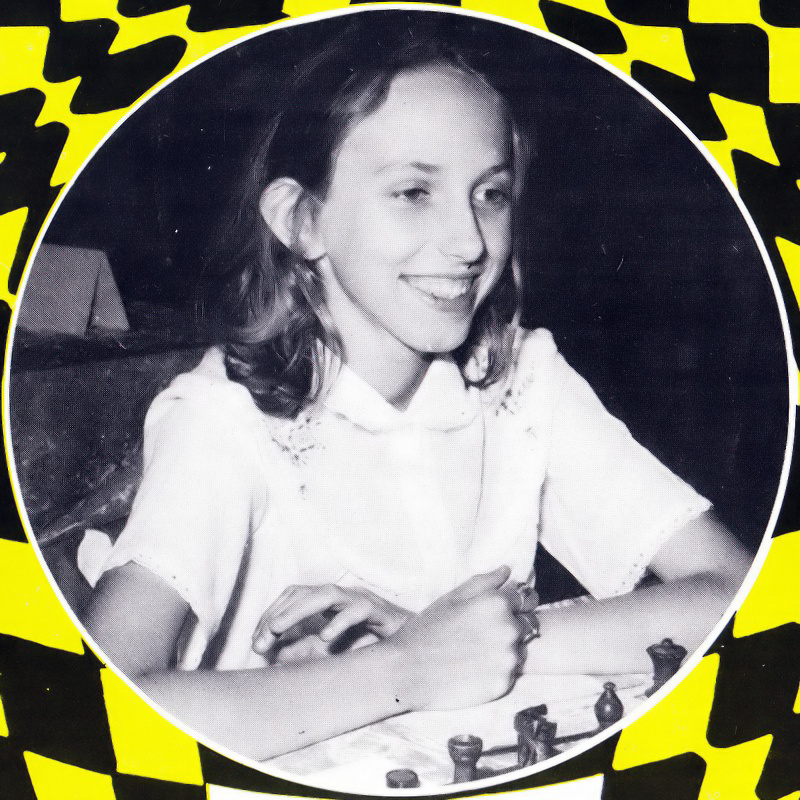
- Dalia Blimke-Dereń in 1991

Personal information
- Born: 20 May 1979 (age 47) Tychy, Poland

Chess career
- Country: Poland
- Title: Woman International Master (1998)
- Peak rating: 2281 (January 1999)

Dalia Blimke-Dereń (née Blimke; born 20 May 1979) is a Polish chess Woman International Master (WIM) (1998).

== Biography ==
In 1991, in Warsaw, Dalia Blimke won the World Youth Chess Championship in the girl's U12 age group. In the following years, she represented Poland many times at the World Youth Chess Championships and European Youth Chess Championship in various age groups. In 1996, she won the Polish Youth Chess Championship in girl's U18 age group, and in 1999 - the gold medal at the World Girls' Junior Team Chess Championship in U20 age group in Rio de Janeiro. A year later, she won two national championship medals: silver in the Polish Blitz Chess Championship and bronze in the Polish Rapid Chess Championship. In the years 1994–2001 she appeared in the finals of Polish Women's Chess Championship six times. She achieved the best result in 1997 in Cisna, taking the fourth place. In the same year, she also took 2nd place (behind Olga Alexandrova) in the Open chess tournament in Frýdek-Místek. In 2003, she took 5th place in the grandmaster tournament in Belgrade.

Dalia Blimke-Dereń reached the highest rating in her career on 1 January 1999, with a score of 2281 points, she was then ranked 6th among Polish female chess players. In 1998, Dalia Blimke-Dereń was awarded the FIDE Women International Master (WIM) title.
