= Andrzej Maciejewski =

Polish chess player (born 1951)

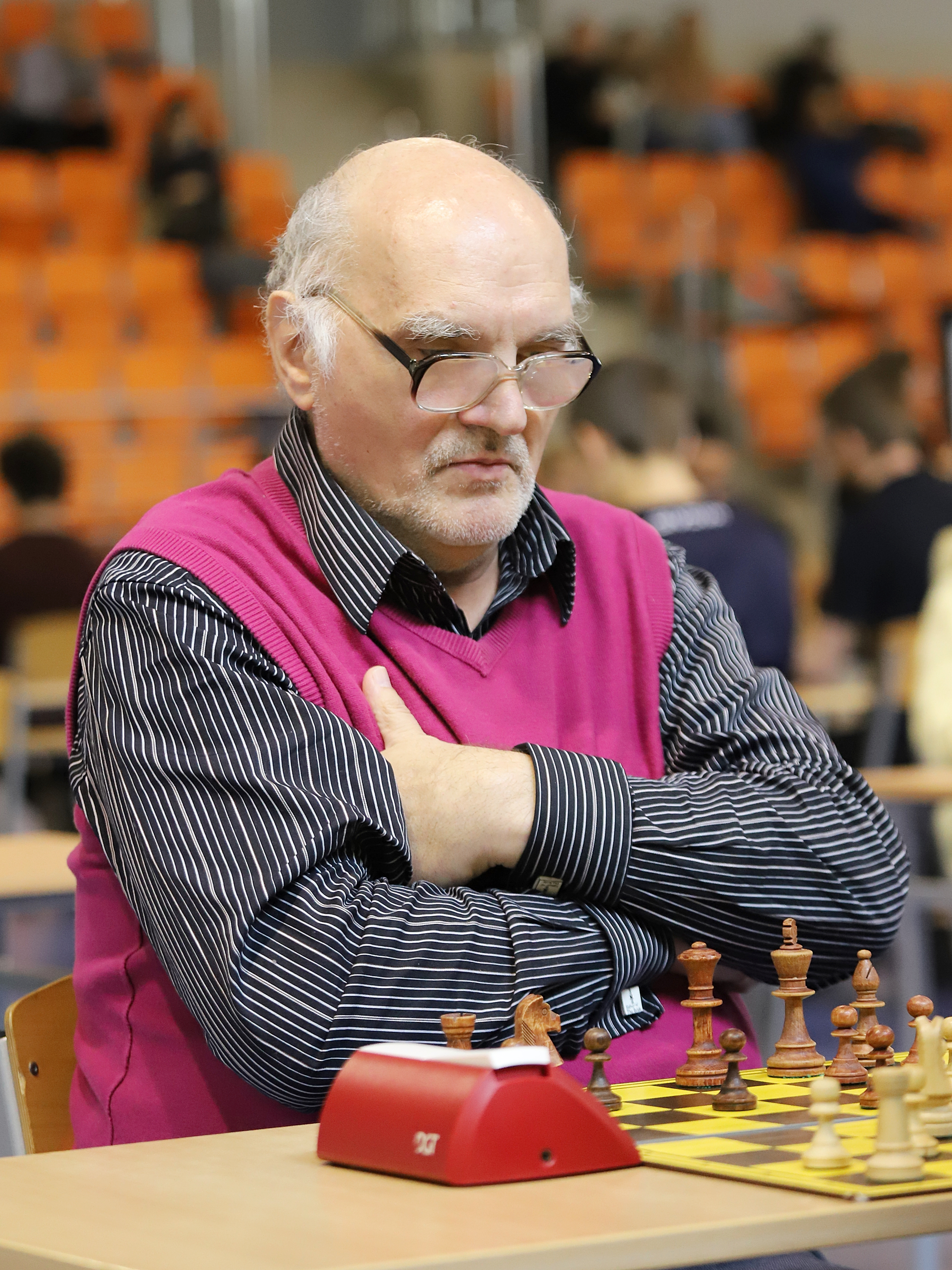
- Andrzej Maciejewski in 2021

Personal information
- Born: 9 July 1951 (age 75) Bydgoszcz, Poland

Chess career
- Country: Poland
- Title: International Master (1987)
- Peak rating: 2470 (July 1973)

Andrzej Maciejewski (born 9 July 1951) is a Polish chess International Master (1987).

== Chess career ==
In 1970 in Wisła Andrzej Maciejewski won the silver medal of the Polish Junior Chess Championship for U20 age group. He participated 10 times in the finals of the Polish Chess Championships (1973–1977, 1979–1980, 1982, 1992–1993), in which Andrzej Maciejewski achieved the best result in his debut championship in 1973, when he won a silver medal. In 1989, in Katowice Andrzej Maciejewski achieved great success, winning the Polish Rapid Chess Championship. In 1993, he won silver medal in the Polish Blitz Chess Championship. Andrzej Maciejewski with chess clubs BKS Chemik Bydgoszcz and KS Łączność Bydgoszcz won 4 medals in Polish Team Chess Championships: gold (1978), silver (1984) and 2 bronze (1982, 1983).

Andrzej Maciejewski performed at many international chess round-robin tournament, achieving the best results in Lublin (1974 - shared 2nd place), Rostock (1983 - ranked 1st place), Gdynia (1985 – shared 3nd place), Łódź (1987 – shared 3rd place), Legnica (1988 – ranked 3rd place and 1989 – shared 1st place) and in Tuzla (1989 – ranked 3rd place). He also participated many times in national Swiss-system tournament, in many of them taking top positions, including: in Iwonicz-Zdrój (1976 - shared 2nd place behind David Bronstein), Janów Podlaski (1976 - shared 2nd place and 1977 - shared 1st place), Świnoujście (1977 - ranked 1st place), Rybnik (1977 – ranked 2nd place), Warsaw (1978 – ranked 2nd place), Wieżyca (1980 – ranked 1st place, Świeradów-Zdrój (1983 – shared 1st place), Nałęczów (1986 - ranked 2nd place) and in Bielsko-Biała (1990 - shared 2nd place).

Andrzej Maciejewski played for Poland in the European Team Chess Championships:

- In 1973, at second reserve board in the 5th European Team Chess Championship in Bath (+0, =1, -0).

Andrzej Maciejewski played for Poland in the European Team Chess Championship preliminaries:

- In 1977, at reserve board in the 5th European Team Chess Championship preliminaries (+1, =0, -1).

Andrzej Maciejewski achieved the highest rating in his career on July 1, 1973, with a score of 2470 points, he was ranked 1st among Polish chess players. Since 1994, in tournaments classified by FIDE, he participated very rare. However, he remains an active chess player, often taking part in blitz and rapid chess tournaments.
