= Jakub Czakon =

Polish chess player (born 1985)

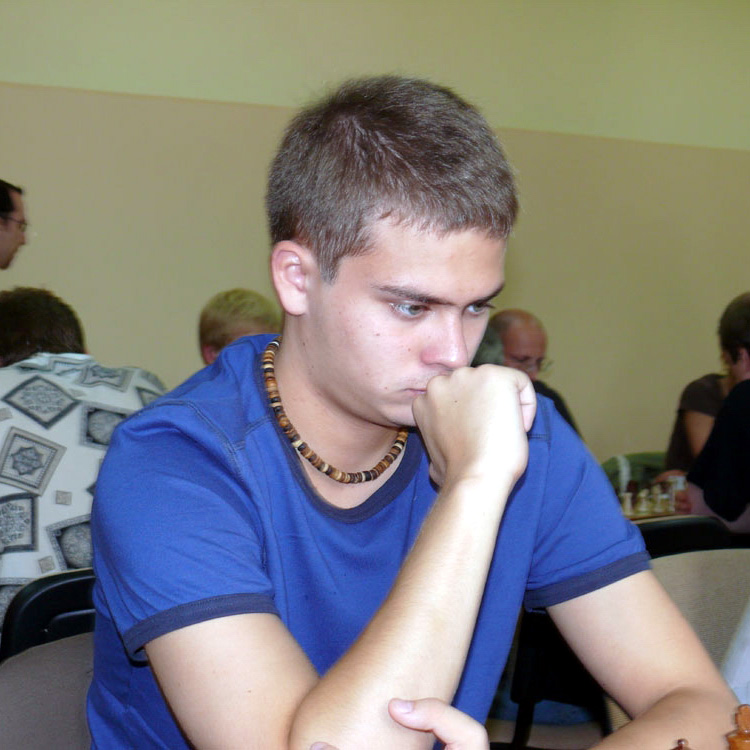
- Jakub Czakon in 2007

Personal information
- Born: 30 December 1985 (age 40) Katowice, Poland

Chess career
- Country: Poland
- Title: International Master (2005)
- FIDE rating: 2465 (July 2026)
- Peak rating: 2510 (October 2007)

Jakub Czakon (born 30 December 1985) is a Polish chess International Master (2005).

== Chess career ==
In 2004, in Środa Wielkopolska Jakub Czakon won silver medal in Polish Youth Chess Championship in U20 age group and took 3rd place in the Round-robin tournament in Legnica. A year earlier, he took 1st place in Swiss-system tournaments in Dobczyce and in Koszalin. In 2005 he single-handedly won in Koszalin. Jakub Czakon achieved further successes in the open chess tournaments played in 2006: he took 1st place in Castelldefels and Aschach an der Donau and shared 1st place in Görlitz and in Leutersdorf. In 2007 he shared 1st place in the open chess tournament in San Sebastián and won the tournament Konik Morski Rewal in Rewal.

Jakub Czakon twice participated in Polish Chess Championships (2008, 2013). He ten times participated in Polish Team Chess Championship (2004-2009, 2011, 2014–2015, 2017) and in 2006 won bronze medal with chess club JKSz MCKiS Jaworzno. In 2008, in Racibórz Jakub Czakon won Polish Blitz Chess Championship.

Jakub Czakon achieved the highest rating in his career so far on October 1, 2007, with a score of 2510 points, he was ranked 20th among Polish chess players.
