= Wiktoria Cieślak =

Polish chess player (born 2000)

Personal information
- Born: 3 March 2000 (age 26) Rybnik, Poland

Chess career
- Country: Poland
- Title: Woman Candidate Master (2024)
- Peak rating: 2073 (October 2018)

Wiktoria Cieślak (born 3 March 2000) is a Polish chess player.

== Chess career ==
Wiktoria Cieślak is a twelve-time participant of the individual Polish Youth Chess Championships in classical chess (2007–2018) and won two medals: silver in 2016 (girls U16 age group) and bronze in 2015 (girls U16 age group) In 2016 she won silver medal in Polish Youth Rapid Chess Championship in girls U16 age group. Also she won two medals in Polish Youth Blitz Chess Championships: gold in 2016 (girls U16 age group) and bronze in 2018 (girls U18 age group). Wiktoria Cieślak participated in European Youth Chess Championships (2016 in girls U16 age group; 2018 in girls U18 age group) and World Youth Chess Championship (2016 in girls U16 age group).

In 2018, in Szczawno-Zdrój Wiktoria Cieślak won the bronze medal of the Polish Women's Blitz Chess Championship. Also she with chess club MKSz Rybnik Wiktoria Cieślak won six medals in Polish Women's Teams Blitz Chess Championships: 4 gold (2014, 2015, 2016, 2017) and 2 silver (2018, 2022).

Wiktoria Cieślak reached the highest rating in her career on October 1, 2018, with a score of 2073 points.
