= Przemysław Ereński =

Polish chess player

Personal information
- Born: 7 March 1934 (age 92) Wielichowo, Poland

Chess career
- Country: Poland
- Peak rating: 2275 (July 1985)

Przemysław Ereński (born 7 March 1934) is a Polish chess player.

== Chess career ==
At the turn of the 1960s and 1970s, Przemysław Ereński was one of the leading Polish chess players in Fast chess, winning three medals in Polish Blitz Chess Championship: silver (Kraków - 1969) and two bronze medals (Bydgoszcz - 1971, and Łódź - 1974). Przemysław Ereński is an eight-time medalist of Polish Blitz Chess Team Championships, including a gold medal (Lubliniec 1972). In the colors of the Pocztowiec chess club from Poznań he also won two bronze medals in Polish Team Championships (Wrocław 1969, Wisła 1971).

Przemysław Ereński is four-time medalist of the Polish Physicians Chess Championships: gold (2007), silver (2011) and bronze twice (2006, 2008).

== Private life ==
He is the elder brother of the first Polish Women Grandmaster (WGM) Hanna Ereńska-Barlo.
