= Jolanta Guzik =

Polish chess player (born 1981)

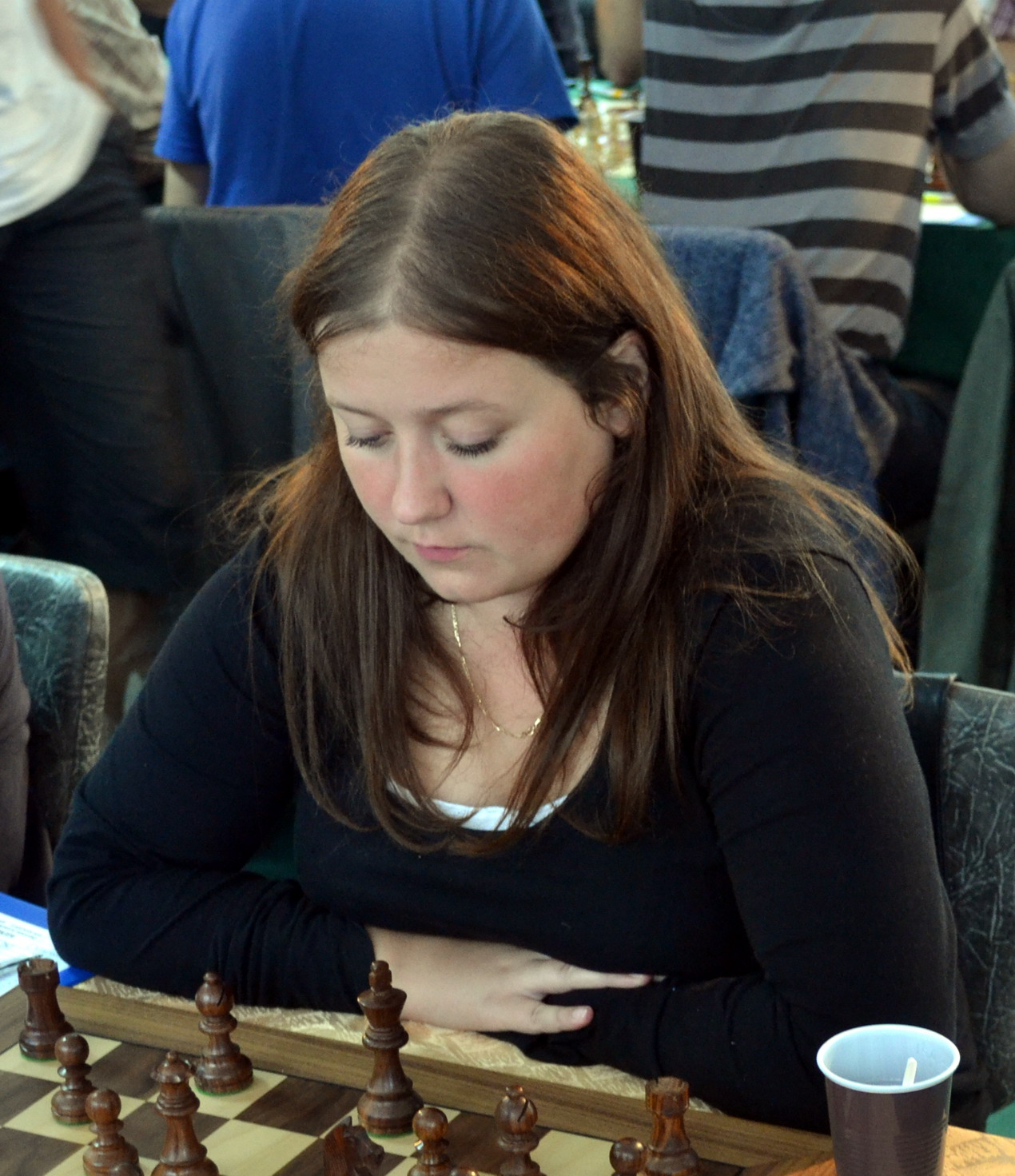
- Jolanta Guzik in 2011

Personal information
- Born: 31 December 1981 (age 44) Jaworzno, Poland

Chess career
- Country: Poland
- Title: Woman FIDE Master (2005)
- Peak rating: 2150 (July 2011)

Jolanta Guzik (born 31 December 1981) is a Polish chess Woman FIDE Master (2005).

== Chess career ==
Jolanta Guzik achieved the greatest successes in her career in fast-paced chess games. She won three medals in Polish Women's Rapid Chess Championships: gold (2004), silver (2016) and bronze (2007). Also she twice won bronze medal in Polish Women's Blitz Chess Championship: 1999 (Łódź) and 2010 (Myślibórz). Jolanta Guzik is a five-time medalist of Polish Women's Team Blitz Chess Championships (gold: Myślibórz 2010; silver: Mielno 2007, Racibórz 2008; bronze: Polanica-Zdrój 2005, Katowice 2011), all in the colors chess club JKSz MCKiS Jaworzno. In 2012, with this chess club she won Polish Women's Team Chess Championship in Wrocław.

In 2008, she took the 3rd place (behind Dariusz Mikrut) in Józef Dominik Memorial in Dobczyce.

Jolanta Guzik achieved the highest rating in her career so far on July 1, 2011, with a score of 2150 points, she was then ranked 30th among Polish female chess players. She is president of chess club JKSz MCKiS Jaworzno since 2009.
