= Krzysztof Żołnierowicz =

Polish chess player (1962–2020)

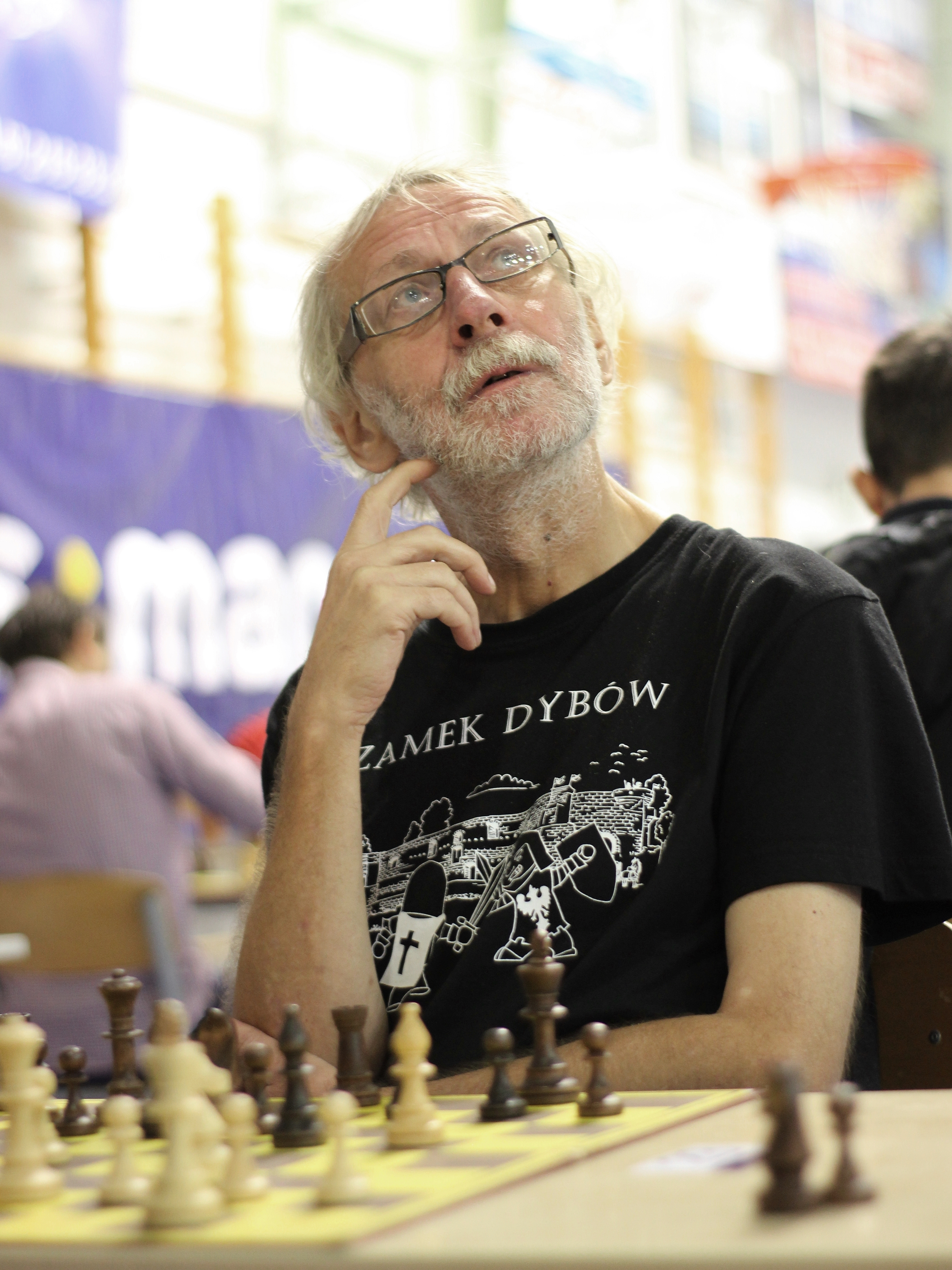
- Krzysztof Żołnierowicz in 2018

Personal information
- Born: 18 January 1962 Bydgoszcz, Poland
- Died: 27 May 2020 (aged 58) Bydgoszcz, Poland

Chess career
- Country: Poland
- Title: International Master (1988)
- Peak rating: 2440 (July 1988)

Krzysztof Żołnierowicz (18 January 1962 – 27 May 2020) was a Polish chess International Master (1988).

== Chess career ==
In 1981 Krzysztof Żołnierowicz won in Olecko won silver medal the Polish Junior Chess Championship in U20 age group. In the years 1984–1990 he appeared in the finals of Polish Chess Championships four times, without achieving medal successes (best result: 9th place in 1990). In 1989 in Katowice Krzysztof Żołnierowicz won the silver medal in the 2nd Polish Rapid Chess Championship, and in 1990 in Gdyni he won the Polish Blitz Chess Championship. He also won medals in Polish Team Chess Championship with chess clubs BKS Chemik Bydgoszcz and KS Piast Słupsk: silver (1990) and 2 bronze (1982, 1983).

Krzysztof Żołnierowicz has participated in international and national chess tournaments many times, achieving successes in Tarnowskie Góry (open, 1982, ranked 2nd place), Świeradów-Zdrój (open, 1983, ranked 3rd place), Białystok (open, 1983, shared 3rd place), Wrocław (1987, ranked 1st place), Myślenice (tournament B, 1987, ranked 2nd place), Słupsk (1987, ranked 1st place), Warsaw (open, 1988, ranked 2nd place after Aleksander Wojtkiewicz), Gothenburg (1989, ranked 3rd place), Legnica (1989, ranked 1st place) and Prague (Bohemians B tournament, 1990, ranked 3rd place)).

Krzysztof Żołnierowicz achieved the highest rating in his career on July 1, 1988, with a score of 2440, he was ranked 5th among Polish chess players at that time.

Buried at Communal Cemetery in Bydgoszcz.

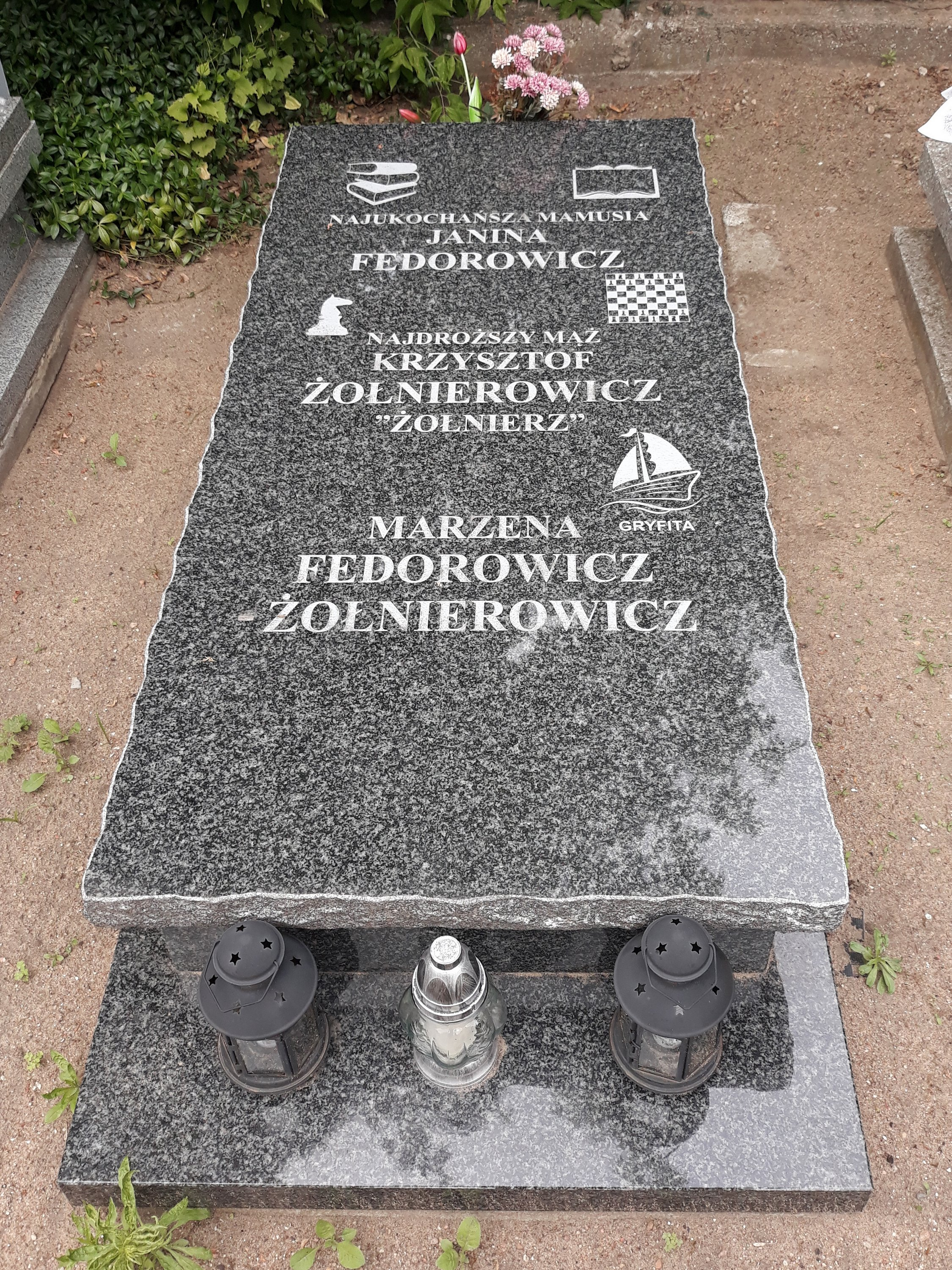
Krzysztof Żołnierowicz's tombstone
