= Ewa Nagrocka =

Polish chess player

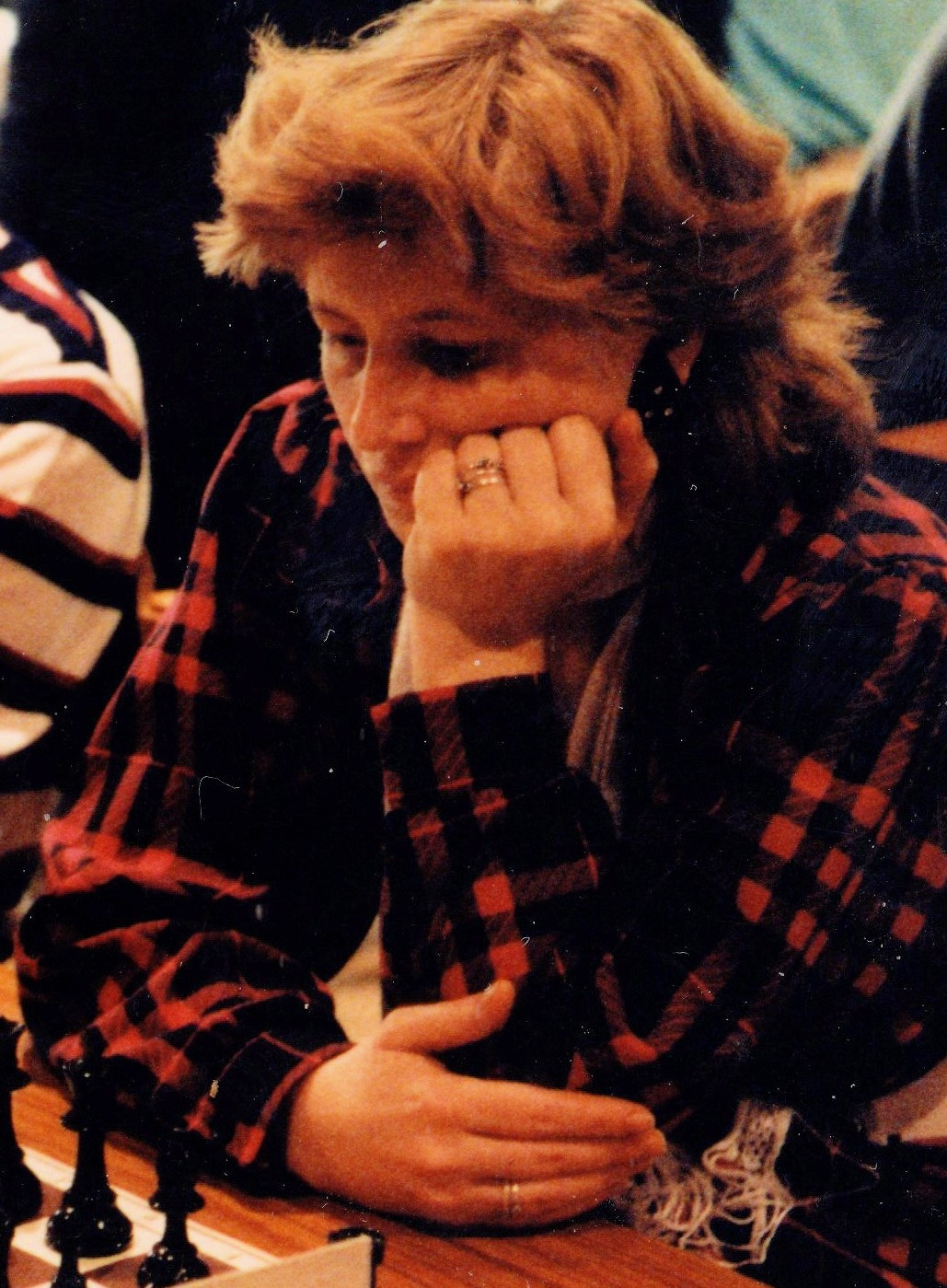
- Ewa Nagrocka in 1988

Personal information
- Born: 8 December 1949
- Died: 23 October 2015 (aged 65)

Chess career
- Country: Poland (until 1988); Germany (since 1988)
- Title: Woman FIDE Master (1983)
- Peak rating: 2165 (July 1991)

Ewa Nagrocka (née Węglarz, 8 December 1949 – 23 October 2015) was a Polish and German (from 1988) chess Woman FIDE Master (1983).

== Chess career ==
From the mid-1970s to the end of the 1980s, Ewa Nagrocka was among the best Polish female chess players. She eight times participated in Polish Women's Chess Championship finals (1975–1986) and reached 4th place in 1982. In 1972, in Lubliniec Ewa Nagrocka achieved the other success in her career, won silver medal in first Polish Women's Blitz Chess Championship.

Ewa Nagrocka moved to West Germany in 1988. she has participated in three German Women's Chess Championship finals (1989–1994), in which she achieved the best result in 1989 in Bad Aibling, when she took 5th place.

Ewa Nagrocka reached her career highest rating on July 1, 1991, with a score of 2165 points.
