= Ignacy Nowak =

Polish chess player (1949–2024)

Personal information
- Born: 12 January 1949 Poznań, Poland
- Died: 10 January 2024 (aged 74) Poznań, Poland

Chess career
- Country: Poland
- Title: FIDE Master (1983)
- Peak rating: 2435 (July 1985)

Ignacy Tadeusz Nowak (12 January 1949 – 10 January 2024) was a Polish chess player who won the Polish Chess Championship in 1985. Nowak achieved the rank of FIDE Master in 1983.

== Life and career ==
From 1971 to 1990, Nowak participated in the Polish Chess Championships twelve times. In 1985 in Gdynia he shared first/third place, and then won an additional tournament in Warsaw, a half point ahead of Jan Adamski. In the Polish Team Chess Championship, Nowak represented the Poznań chess club twice in 1985 and 1988 and won the team event. Nowak also won the Polish Blitz Championships twice in 1973 and 1987.

From 1999 he was not involved in serious chess tournaments. Nowak died on 10 January 2024, at the age of 74.
