= Joanna Worek =

Polish-Czech chess player (born 1986)

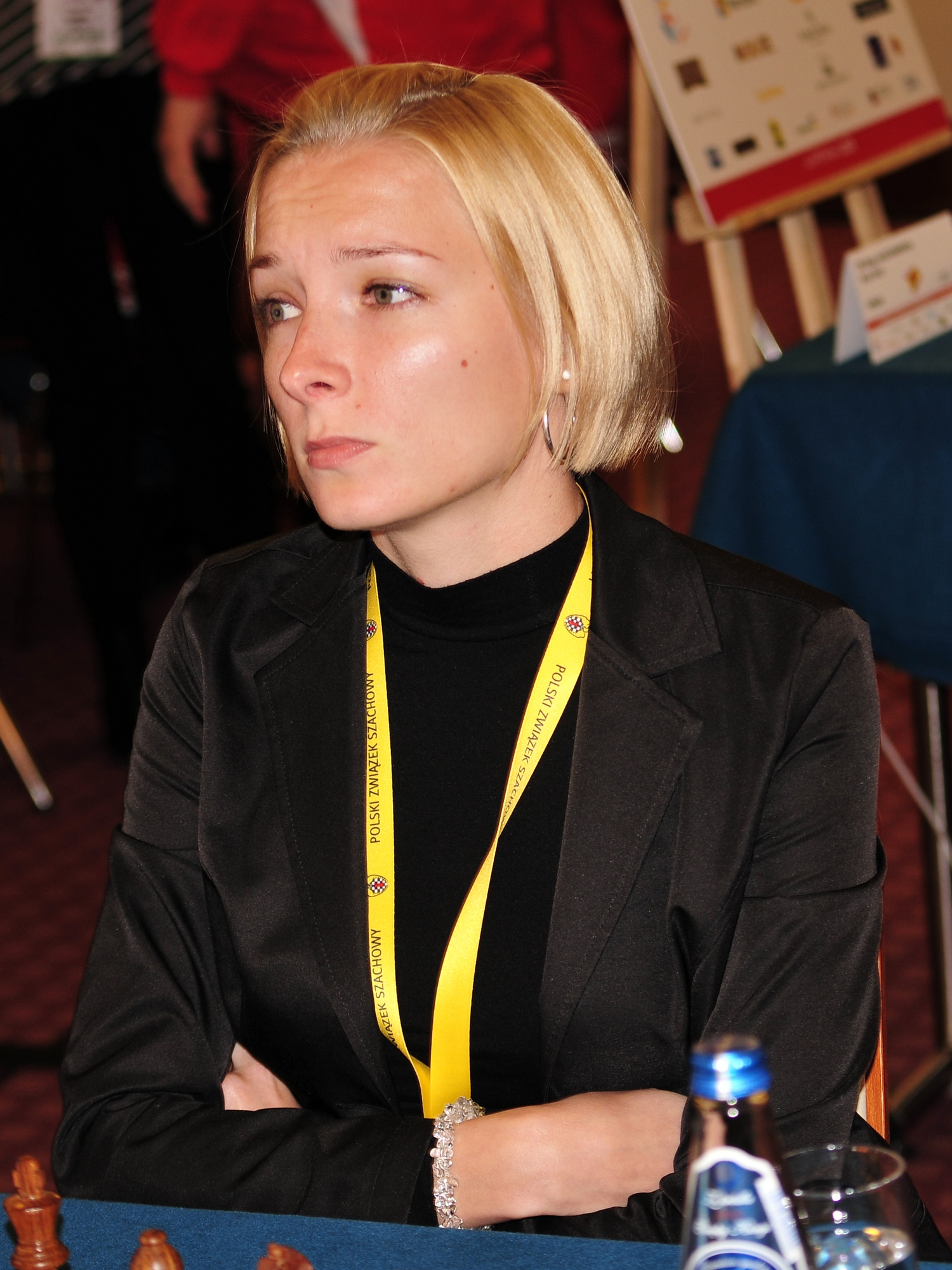
- Worek in 2013

Personal information
- Born: 23 January 1986 (age 40) Pszczyna, Poland

Chess career
- Country: Poland (until 2016); Czech Republic (since 2016)
- Title: Woman Grandmaster (2013)
- Peak rating: 2363 (June 2016)

Joanna Worek (born 23 January 1986) is a Polish and Czech chess player holding the title of Woman Grandmaster (WGM).

In 2001, she won the bronze medal at the World Youth Chess Championship in the Girls U16 category. Worek transferred national federations from Poland to the Czech Republic in 2016. In the same year, she won the Czech Women's Chess Championship.

In team events, Worek played for Poland in the Women's Chess Olympiad of 2012 and the Women's European Team Chess Championship in 2013. Since 2016, she has played for the Czech team in the Women's Chess Olympiad, the Women's European Team Championship, and the Women's Mitropa Cup.
