= Klaudiusz Urban =

Polish chess player (born 1968)

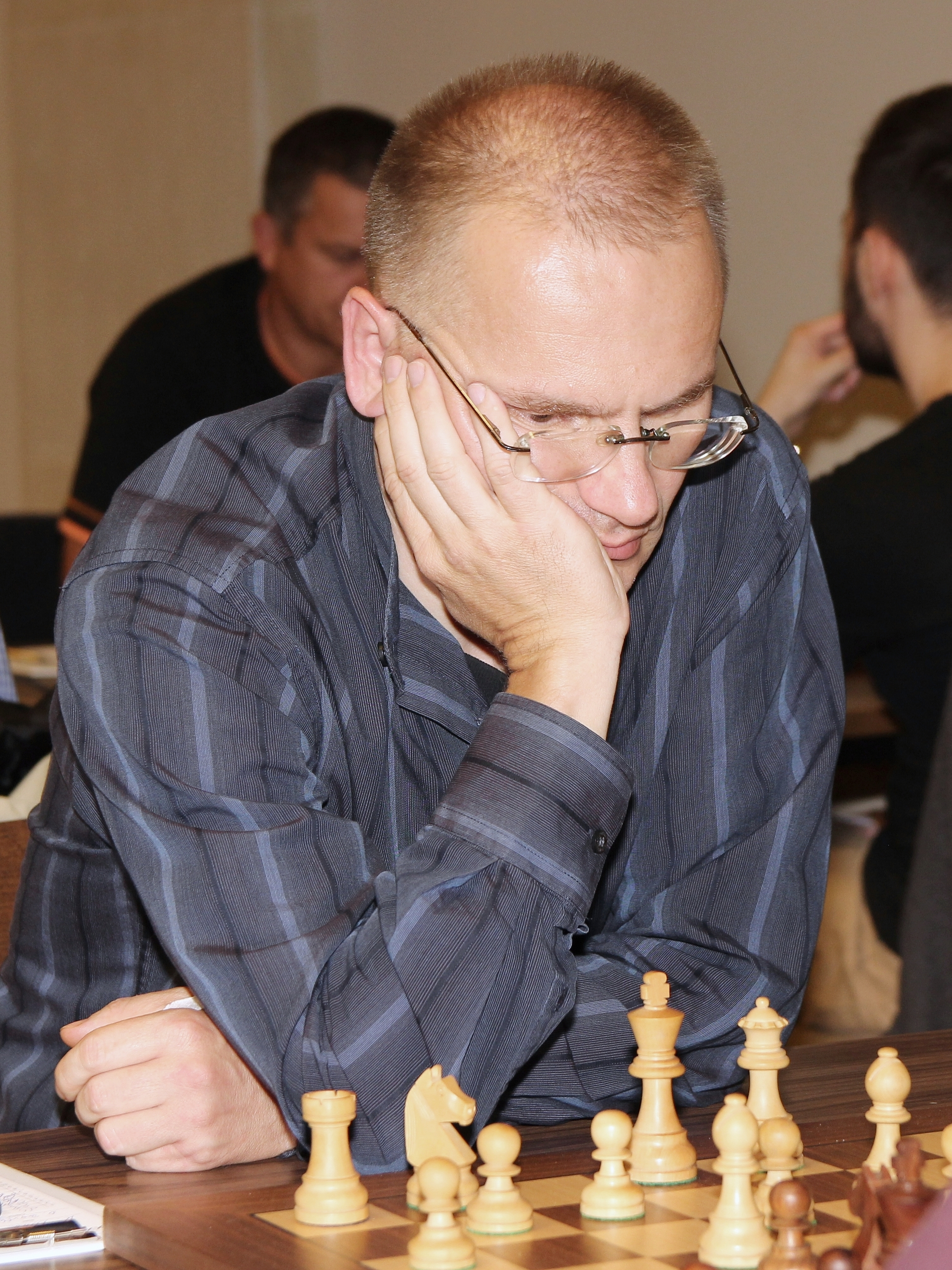
- Urban in 2016

Personal information
- Born: 2 November 1968 (age 57) Poznań, Poland

Chess career
- Country: Poland
- Title: International Master (1991)
- FIDE rating: 2425 (July 2026)
- Peak rating: 2520 (October 2004)

Klaudiusz Urban (born 2 November 1968) is a Polish chess player who won the Polish Chess Championship in 1996. FIDE International Master (1991).

== Chess career ==
In Polish Junior Chess Championship (U-20), Urban won silver (1989) and bronze (1987) medals. Many times played in the Polish Chess Championship's finals. In a very successful debut in 1991 he won silver medal, but in 1996 won gold medal. In Polish Team Chess Championships, Urban won three medals: gold (1988) and two bronze (1998, 2001). He was awarded the International Master title in 1991.

Urban played for Poland in Chess Olympiads:

- In 1992, at second reserve board in the 30th Chess Olympiad in Manila (+3, =4, -0),
- In 1996, at second reserve board in the 32nd Chess Olympiad in Yerevan (+5, =5, -1),
- In 1998, at second reserve board in the 33rd Chess Olympiad in Elista (+2, =6, -0).

Urban played for Poland in European Team Chess Championship:

- In 1992, at reserve board in the 10th European Team Chess Championship in Debrecen (+3, =3, -1),
- In 1997, at third board in the 11th European Team Chess Championship in Pula (+1, =5, -3).
