= Joanna Węglarz =

Polish chess player (born 1973)

Personal information
- Born: 22 February 1973 (age 53) Bydgoszcz, Poland

Chess career
- Country: Poland
- Peak rating: 2095 (January 1994)

Joanna Węglarz (née Byczyńska, born 22 February 1973) is a Polish chess player.

== Chess career ==
As a junior, Joanna Węglarz was one of the lead national chess female players. In 1988, in Bydgoszcz with chess club Hetman Bydgoszcz she won a silver medal in Polish Youth Team Chess Championship. In 1990, in Konin she took the 9th place in the final of Polish Youth Chess Championship in U20 girls age group, while in 1991, in Limanowa she won a bronze medal in Polish Youth Chess Championship in U18 girls age group. From 1995 to 2000, Joanna Węglarz did not take part in chess tournaments classified by FIDE, and in the following years she participated mainly in team competitions (Kuyavian-Pomeranian Chess Association Team Championships and Polish Team Chess Championships), representing the chess clubs Chemik Bydgoszcz and Baszta Żnin.

In 2006, in Wrocław Joanna Węglarz won a bronze medal in the individual Polish Higher Education Chess Championship. In 2010, in Myślibórz she achieved the greatest success in her career, winning Polish Women's Blitz Chess Championship.

Joanna Węglarz reached her career highest rating on January 1, 1994, with a score of 2095 points, then shared 37th-40th place among Polish female chess players.
