= Miętne =

Village in the administrative district of Gmina Garwolin

- Village
- Location within Poland
- Coordinates: 51°55′21″N 21°34′22″E
- Country: Poland
- Voivodeship: Masovian
- County: Garwolin
- Gmina: Garwolin
- Population (approx.): 2,000

Miętne [ˈmjɛntnɛ] is a village in the administrative district of Gmina Garwolin, within Garwolin County, Masovian Voivodeship, in east-central Poland.
