= Bożena Sikora-Giżyńska =

Polish chess player (born 1960)

Personal information
- Born: 18 April 1960 (age 66) Bielsko-Biała, Poland

Chess career
- Country: Poland
- Title: Woman International Master (1986)
- FIDE rating: 2175 (January 1998)
- Peak rating: 2265 (July 1987)

Bożena Sikora-Giżyńska (born 18 April 1960) is a Polish chess player who won the Polish Women's Chess Championship in 1990. She received the FIDE title of Woman International Master (WIM) in 1986.

== Chess career ==
In 1975 Bożena Sikora-Giżyńska won Polish Junior Chess Championship. In 1977 she won European Junior Chess Championship (U-20) in Novi Sad.

From 1975 to 1992 Bożena Sikora-Giżyńska played 17 times in the Polish Women's Chess Championship's finals. She won three medals: gold (1990), silver (1981) and bronze (1988). Also Bożena Sikora-Giżynska won gold medal in Polish Team Chess Championships (1990).

Bożena Sikora-Giżyńska won or shared first place in an international women's chess tournament in Nałęczów (1982, 1983), Iwonicz-Zdrój (1985) and Prague "Bohemians" (1987–1990, 1992). She was awarded the WIM title in 1986.

Bożena Sikora-Giżyńska played for Poland in Women's Chess Olympiads:

- In 1990, at second board in the 29th Chess Olympiad (women) in Novi Sad (+2, =4, -4).
