= List of Polish chess masters =

This is a list of Polish chess masters. Some players assumed the citizenship of another country later in their careers (for example Janowski and Najdorf later became French and Argentinian citizens, respectively).

== Pre-FIDE chess masters ==
- Adolf Zytogorski (fl. 1841–1861)
- Jan Herman Zukertort (fl. 1860–1888)
- Szymon Winawer (fl. 1867–1901)
- Dawid Janowski (fl. 1891–1926)
- Henryk Jerzy Salwe (fl. 1903–1914)
- Dawid Przepiórka (fl. 1903–1938)
- Teodor Regedziński (fl. 1917–1952)

== FIDE chess masters ==
=== Men ===
- 1950 – Akiba Rubinstein – Grandmaster
- 1950 – Ksawery Tartakower – Grandmaster
- 1950 – Mieczysław Najdorf – Grandmaster
- 1950 – Kazimierz Makarczyk
- 1950 – Kazimierz Plater
- 1953 – Bogdan Śliwa
- 1955 – Paulin Frydman
- 1976 – Włodzimierz Schmidt – Grandmaster
- 1980 – Adam Kuligowski – Grandmaster
- 1990 – Aleksander Wojtkiewicz – Grandmaster
- 1993 – Robert Kuczyński – Grandmaster
- 1996 – Marcin Kamiński – Grandmaster
- 1996 – Robert Kempiński – Grandmaster
- 1996 – Michał Krasenkow – Grandmaster
- 1997 – Jacek Gdański – Grandmaster
- 1998 – Bartłomiej Macieja – Grandmaster
- 1998 – Tomasz Markowski – Grandmaster
- 1999 – Bartosz Soćko – Grandmaster
- 2000 – Paweł Jaracz – Grandmaster
- 2001 – Paweł Blehm – Grandmaster
- 2002 – Artur Jakubiec – Grandmaster
- 2002 – Kamil Mitoń – Grandmaster
- 2002 – Mirosław Grabarczyk – Grandmaster
- 2003 – Łukasz Cyborowski – Grandmaster
- 2003 – Aleksander Miśta – Grandmaster
- 2005 – Mateusz Bartel – Grandmaster
- 2005 – Piotr Bobras – Grandmaster
- 2005 – Radosław Wojtaszek – Grandmaster
- 2006 – Paweł Czarnota – Grandmaster
- 2006 – Grzegorz Gajewski – Grandmaster
- 2006 – Bartłomiej Heberla – Grandmaster
- 2006 – Radosław Jedynak – Grandmaster
- 2007 – Marcin Dziuba – Grandmaster
- 2009 – Krzysztof Jakubowski – Grandmaster
- 2009 – Wojciech Moranda – Grandmaster
- 2009 – Michał Olszewski – Grandmaster
- 2009 – Dariusz Świercz – Grandmaster
- 2010 – Rafał Antoniewski – Grandmaster
- 2010 – Kacper Piorun – Grandmaster
- 2012 – Krzysztof Bulski – Grandmaster
- 2012 – Jacek Tomczak – Grandmaster
- 2013 – Jan-Krzysztof Duda – Grandmaster
- 2013 – Kamil Dragun – Grandmaster
- 2013 – Marcin Tazbir – Grandmaster
- 2014 – Zbigniew Pakleza – Grandmaster
- 2015 – Jacek Stopa – Grandmaster
- 2016 – Marcel Kanarek – Grandmaster
- 2017 – Daniel Sadzikowski – Grandmaster
- 2017 – Tomasz Warakomski – Grandmaster
- 2018 – Grzegorz Nasuta – Grandmaster
- 2019 – Oskar Wieczorek – Grandmaster
- 2020 – Maciej Klekowski – Grandmaster
- 2020 – Marcin Krzyżanowski – Grandmaster
- 2020 – Arkadiusz Leniart – Grandmaster
- 2021 – Łukasz Jarmuła – Grandmaster
- 2021 – Szymon Gumularz – Grandmaster
- 2022 – Igor Janik – Grandmaster
- 2023 – Paweł Teclaf – Grandmaster
- 2025 – Jakub Kosakowski – Grandmaster
- 2025 – Jan Klimkowski – Grandmaster
- 2025 – Jan Malek – Grandmaster
- 2025 – Miłosz Szpar – Grandmaster
- 2025 – Jakub Seemann – Grandmaster

=== Women ===
- 1981 – Hanna Ereńska – Grandmaster
- 1984 – Krystyna Hołuj-Radzikowska – Grandmaster
- 1986 – Agnieszka Brustman – Grandmaster
- 1994 – Krystyna Dąbrowska – Grandmaster
- 1995 – Monika Soćko (Bobrowska) – Grandmaster (1995), Grandmaster (2008)
- 1997 – Joanna Dworakowska – Grandmaster, International Master (2001)
- 1998 – Iweta Rajlich – Grandmaster, International Master (2002)
- 1999 – Marta Michna – Grandmaster
- 2005 – Jolanta Zawadzka – Grandmaster
- 2006 – Beata Zawadzka – Grandmaster
- 2007 – Barbara Jaracz – Grandmaster
- 2008 – Monika Krupa – Grandmaster
- 2009 – Marta Bartel – Grandmaster
- 2009 – Joanna Majdan – Grandmaster
- 2010 – Karina Cyfka – Grandmaster, International Master (2016)
- 2012 – Katarzyna Toma – Grandmaster
- 2013 – Joanna Worek – Grandmaster
- 2014 – Klaudia Kulon – Grandmaster, International Master (2019)
- 2020 – Anna Warakomska – Grandmaster
- 2021 – Julia Antolak – Grandmaster
- 2023 – Maria Malicka – Grandmaster
- 2024 – Michalina Rudzińska – Grandmaster
- 2024 – Alicja Śliwicka – Grandmaster
