= Polish Women Chess Championship 2010 =

2010 chess tournament in Warsaw, Poland

The championship will be played between from 9 to 17 January 2010 in Warsaw. The championship was contested by 16 players in a 2 games match format. (In case the match was drawn after 2 games there were first rapid and then if needed blitz tie-breaks). The time control was 90 minutes for 40 moves + 30 minutes. There was a 30 seconds increment for every move from the start.

== List of participants ==
players
Name	Title	Rating
Iweta Rajlich	IM	2455
Monika Soćko	GM	2450
Jolanta Zawadzka	WGM	2391
Joanna Dworakowska	IM	2374
Joanna Majdan	WGM	2374
Beata Kądziołka	WGM	2328
Karina Szczepkowska-Horowska	WGM	2322
Marta Przeździecka	WGM	2265
Agnieszka Matras-Clement	WIM	2251
Katarzyna Toma	WIM	2234
Joanna Worek	WIM	2226
Klaudia Kulon	WFM	2202
Maria Gościniak	WFM	2188
Katarzyna Adamowicz	WFM	2125
Kinga Zakościelna	WFM	2030
Luiza Tomaszewska	I+	1891

== Results ==
note: first player had white in game 1 and black in game 2, players in bold won the match.

Round 1
Iweta Rajlich - Luiza Tomaszewska 1-0, 1-0
Kinga Zakościelna - Monika Soćko 0-1, 0-1
Katarzyna Adamowicz - Jolanta Zawadzka 0-1, 0-1
Maria Gościniak - Joanna Dworakowska 0-1, 0-1
Klaudia Kulon - Joanna Majdan 0-1, 1/2
Joanna Worek - Beata Kądziołka 0-1, 1-0, 0-1, 0-1
Katarzyna Toma - Karina Szczepkowska-Horowska 1-0, 1-0
Matras-Clement Agnieszka - Marta Przeździecka 1-0, 0-1, 0-1, 1/2

Round 2
Marta Przeździecka - Iweta Rajlich 0-1, 0-1
Katarzyna Toma - Monika Soćko 0-1, 1/2
Jolanta Zawadzka - Beata Kądziołka 1-0, 1-0
Joanna Majdan - Joanna Dworakowska 1-0, 1/2
Luiza Tomaszewska - Matras-Clement Agnieszka 0-1, 0-1
Kinga Zakościelna - Karina Szczepkowska-Horowska 0-1, 0-1
Katarzyna Adamowicz - Joanna Worek 0-1, 0-1
Maria Gościniak - Klaudia Kulon 0-1, 0-1

Round 3
Joanna Majdan - Iweta Rajlich 0-1, 0-1
Monika Soćko - Jolanta Zawadzka 1-0, 1/2
Joanna Dworakowska - Klaudia Kulon 1-0, 0-1, 0-1, 1-0, 0-1, 0-1
Beata Kądziołka - Joanna Worek 1/2, 1/2, 1-0, 1/2
Katarzyna Toma - Karina Szczepkowska-Horowska 1-0, 0-1, 1-0, 1-0
Marta Przeździecka - Matras-Clement Agnieszka 0-1, 1-0, 1-0, 1/2
Maria Gościniak - Luiza Tomaszewska 1-0, 1-0
Katarzyna Adamowicz - Kinga Zakościelna 1-0, 1-0

Round 4
Iweta Rajlich - Monika Soćko 0-1, 0-1
Jolanta Zawadzka - Joanna Majdan 1-0, 1/2
Marta Przeździecka - Klaudia Kulon 1/2, 1/2, 0-1, 1-0, 1-0, 0-1, 0-1
Beata Kądziołka - Katarzyna Toma 1/2, 1-0
Joanna Dworakowska - Matras-Clement Agnieszka 1-0, 1/2
Karina Szczepkowska-Horowska - Joanna Worek 0-1, 1-0, 0-1, 1/2
Katarzyna Adamowicz - Maria Gościniak 1-0, 1-0
Luiza Tomaszewska - Kinga Zakościelna 1/2, 0-1
