= Franciszek Borkowski =

Polish chess player (born 1957)

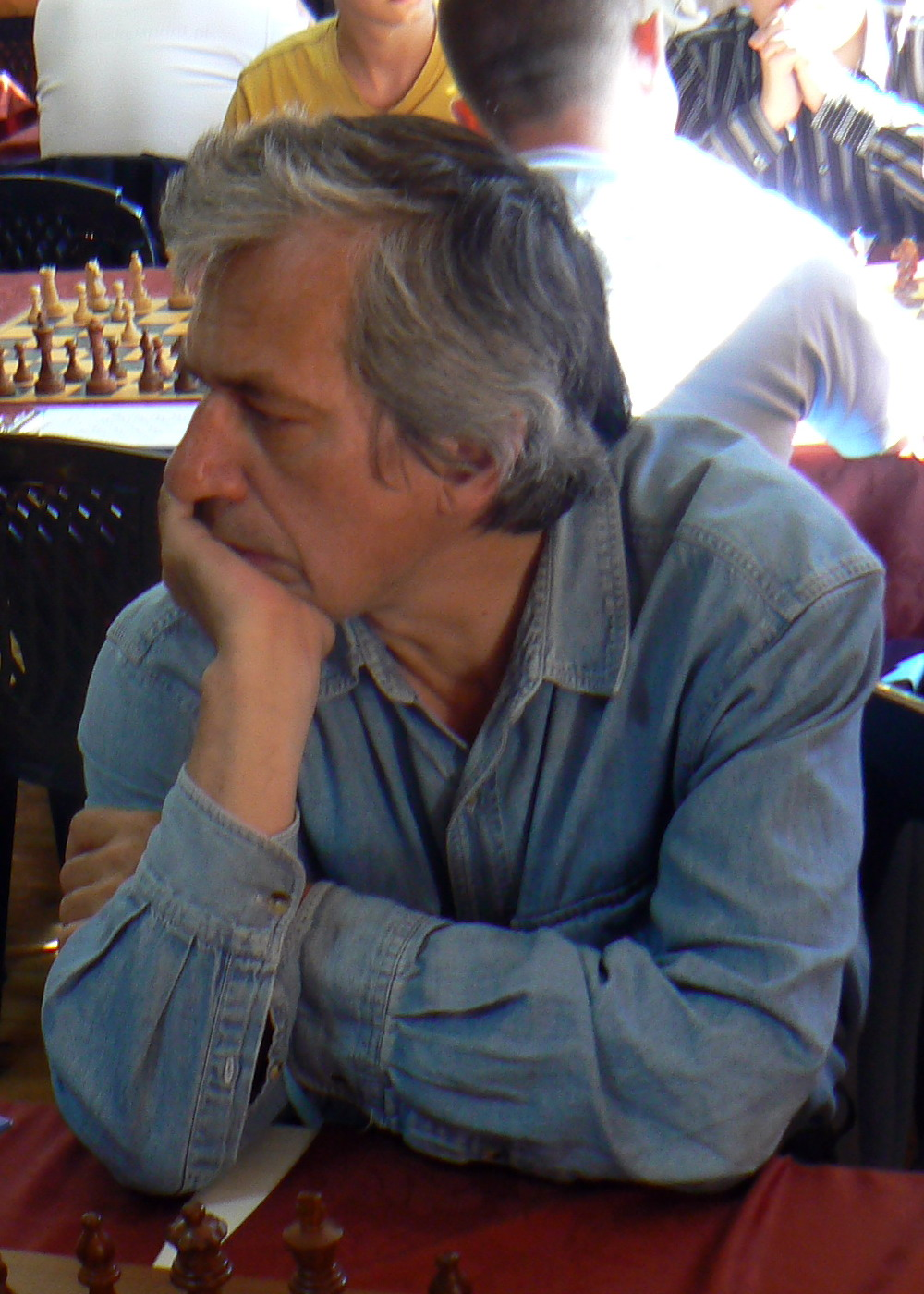
- Franciszek Borkowski in 2009

Personal information
- Born: 31 July 1957 (age 68) Wrocław, Poland

Chess career
- Country: Poland
- Title: International Master (1980)
- FIDE rating: 2257 (April 2018)
- Peak rating: 2450 (January 1987)

Franciszek Borkowski (born 31 July 1957) is a Polish chess International Master (1980).

== Chess career ==
In 1974, in Grudziądz Franciszek Borkowski won Polish Junior Chess Championship for U20 age group. A year later, he took 5th place in the European Junior Chess Championship held in Groningen and made his debut in the final of the Polish Chess Championship in Poznań. Franciszek Borkowski participated 6 times in the finals of the Polish Chess Championships (1975–1976, 1979, 1983, 1988–1989), in which he achieved the best result in 1988, when he ranked in 6th place. In 1990, Franciszek Borkowski won bronze medal in the Polish Blitz Chess Championship.

Franciszek Borkowski played for Poland in the World Student Team Chess Championships:

- In 1976, at second reserve board in the 21st World Student Team Chess Championship in Caracas (+2, =2, -1),
- In 1977, at first reserve board in the 22nd World Student Team Chess Championship in Mexico City (+4, =2, -1).

Franciszek Borkowski has participated in national and international chess tournaments many times, achieving successes in:

- 1976 - Pristina - shared 3rd-4th place;
- 1977 - Jelenia Góra - ranked 1st place, Eksjö - ranked 1st place;
- 1979 - Słupsk - shared 3rd-4th place;
- 1984 - Gdańsk - ranked 1st place, Wrocław - ranked 2nd place;
- 1985 - Gdynia - shared 1st-2nd place;
- 1986 - Gdynia - ranked 2nd place;
- 1987 - Gdynia - ranked 3rd place;
- 1991 - Odense - ranked 1st place.

Franciszek Borkowski reached his career highest rating on 1 January 1987, with a score of 2450 points, and was then 3rd-4th place (behind Włodzimierz Schmidt and Marek Hawełko, together with Robert Kuczyński) among Polish chess players.

== Private life ==
Franciszek Borkowski is the son of Polish logician, mathematician and philosopher, professor Ludwik Borkowski (1914–1993).
