= Ryszard Skrobek =

Polish chess player (born 1951)

Personal information
- Born: 4 July 1951 (age 75) Oleśnica, Poland

Chess career
- Country: Poland
- Title: International Master (1978); ICCF Grandmaster (1990)
- Peak rating: 2460 (January 1978)

Ryszard Skrobek (born 4 July 1951) is a Polish chess player who won the Polish Chess Championship in 1977. FIDE International Master (1978). ICCF Grandmaster (1990).

== Chess career ==
Ryszard Skrobek has been one of the biggest surprises in the history of the individual Polish Chess Championships. In 1977 Polish Chess Championship in Piotrków Trybunalski he as a relatively little-known chess player in convincing style won title, ahead of Włodzimierz Schmidt and Aleksander Sznapik. From 1975 to 1987 Skrobek played six times in the Polish Chess Championship's finals. He has participated in several international tournaments. The best results are first places in Hradec Králové (1977) and in the tournament at Cuba (1978). He was awarded the International Master title in 1978. In 1979 he represented Poland in World Chess Championship zonal tournament in Warsaw.

Ryszard Skrobek is one of the strongest Polish correspondence chess player. In 1983 he won Polish Championship in correspondence chess. In the 13th Correspondence Chess Olympiad finals (25.11.2004-22.12.2009) Skrobek won the bronze medal. He was awarded the ICCF International Master title in 1989 and ICCF Grandmaster title in 1990.

Ryszard Skrobek played for Poland in World Student Team Chess Championship:

- In 1977, at second board in the 22nd World Student Team Chess Championship in Mexico City (+2, =2, -7).
