= Zbigniew Szymczak =

Polish chess player (1952–2019)

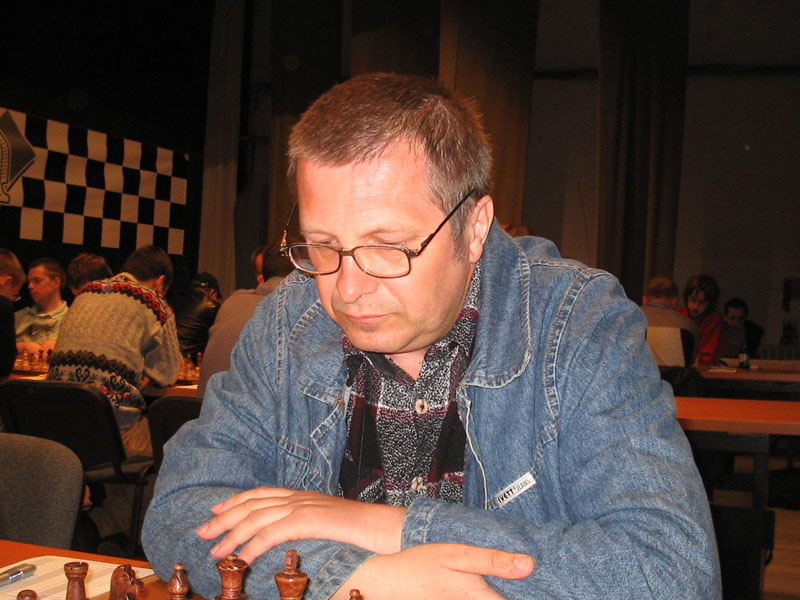
- Szymczak in Barlinek (2006)

Personal information
- Born: 4 January 1952 Lublin, Poland
- Died: 11 September 2019 (aged 67)

Chess career
- Country: Poland
- Title: International Master (1976)
- Peak rating: 2327 (January 2005)

Zbigniew Szymczak (4 January 1952 – 11 September 2019) was a Polish chess player who won the Polish Chess Championship in 1983, and became a FIDE International Master in 1976.

== Chess career ==
Zbigniew Szymczak became interested in chess during study in Maria Curie-Skłodowska University where he graduated Faculty of Pedagogy in 1978. In 1967 he shared first place in Polish Junior Chess Championship in Białystok. From 1974 to 1989 Szymczak played ten times in the Polish Chess Championship's finals. In 1976 he became the youngest International Master title holder in Poland. In 1977 he won the tournament in Budapest, and a year later shared first place in the Prievidza. Another victory in an international tournament came in 1982 in Karviná. In this same year he won the gold medal Polish Team Chess Championship. In 1983, the most successful in his career, winning the Polish Chess Champion title in Piotrków Trybunalski.

Zbigniew Szymczak played for Poland in World Student Team Chess Championship:

- In 1976, at third board in the 21st World Student Team Chess Championship in Caracas (+1, =3, -3),
- In 1977, at fourth board in the 22nd World Student Team Chess Championship in Mexico City (+5, =3, -3).

Zbigniew Szymczak was a well known chess coach of many famous Polish chess players. He was a trainer of Grandmasters: Iweta Rajlich (cooperation in 1996-1999), Robert Kempiński (1991-2001), Radosław Wojtaszek (1995-1996 and 2001).
