= Kostro =

Kostro is a surname. Notable people with the surname include:

- Frank Kostro (born 1937), American baseball player
- Jerzy Kostro (born 1937), Polish chess player
