= Litwiński =

Litwiński, feminine:Litwińska is a Polish-language surname. Notable people with the surname include:

- Apolonia Litwińska, Polish chess player
- Arkadiusz Litwiński
- Wiktor Litwiński
