= Witold Balcerowski =

Polish chess player (1935–2001)

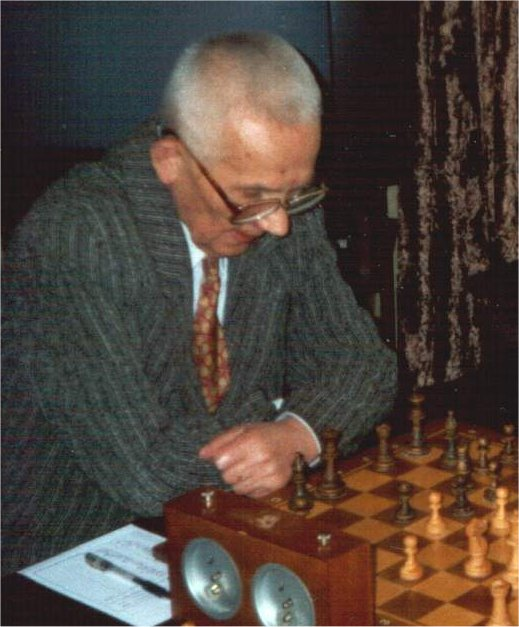
- Balcerowski in 2001

Personal information
- Born: 10 August 1935 Pinsk, Poland
- Died: 9 November 2001 (aged 66) Poland

Chess career
- Country: Poland
- Title: FIDE Master (1983)
- Peak rating: 2380 (July 1971)

Witold Balcerowski (10 August 1935 – 9 November 2001) was a Polish chess player who twice won the Polish Chess Championship in 1962 and 1965.

== Chess career ==
Balcerowski began playing chess at the age of 15. In 1952 Witold Balcerowski won the Polish Junior Chess Championships. However, the next few years he devoted to sentence baccalaureate and higher education, and returned to chess only in the 1960s. From 1960 to 1972 Balcerowski eleven times participated in the Polish Chess Championship's finals. Twice he won title: in 1962 in Poznań after the additional match victory (4:2) to Zbigniew Doda, and in 1965 in Lublin.

From 1954 to 1977 Balcerowski regularly participated in the Polish Team Chess Championship, where he won ten medals, including one gold.

Participated in many international chess tournaments. Best results: fifth place in the I Memorial Akiba Rubinstein in Polanica-Zdrój in 1963, and shared second - fourth place in tournament in Lublin in 1968.

Witold Balcerowski played for Poland in Chess Olympiads:

- In 1962, at second board in the 15th Chess Olympiad in Varna (+5, =4, -4),
- In 1964, at reserve board in the 16th Chess Olympiad in Tel Aviv (+4, =7, -2),
- In 1966, at reserve board in the 17th Chess Olympiad in Havana (+5, =3, -3).
