= Elżbieta Kowalska =

Polish chess player (born 1944)

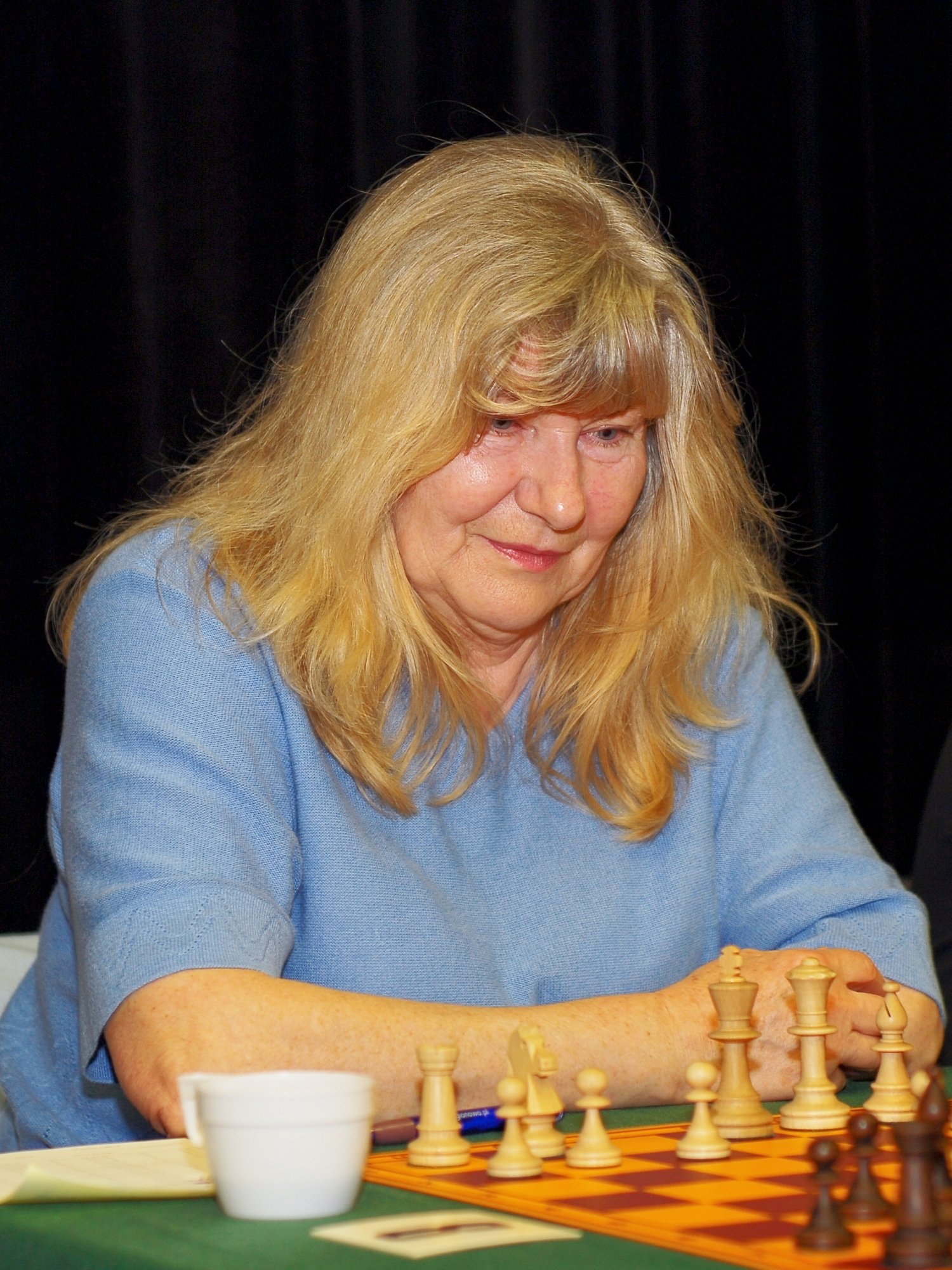
- Kowalska in 2013

Personal information
- Born: 1 June 1944 (age 82) Warsaw, Poland

Chess career
- Country: Poland
- Title: Woman FIDE Master (1989)
- Peak rating: 2185 (January 1990)

Elżbieta Kowalska (born 1 June 1944), née Kłaput, later Lipska, is a Polish chess player who won the Polish Women's Chess Championship in 1967.

== Chess career ==
In the 1960s and 1970s, Kowalska was one of the leading Polish women chess players. From 1964 to 1983 she played 15 times in the Polish Women's Chess Championship finals. Her greatest success was achieved in 1967 in Kielce, when she won the tournament. She also won 11 gold medals (1966, 1968, 1970, 1973, 1974, 1975, 1976, 1977, 1979, 1981, 1983) in the Polish Team Chess Championships. In 1979, she won the Swiss-system tournament in Warsaw (before Agnieszka Brustman). In the 1994 international tournament in Wisła, Kowalska beat WGM Marta Litinskaya.
