= Barbara Kaczorowska =

Polish chess player

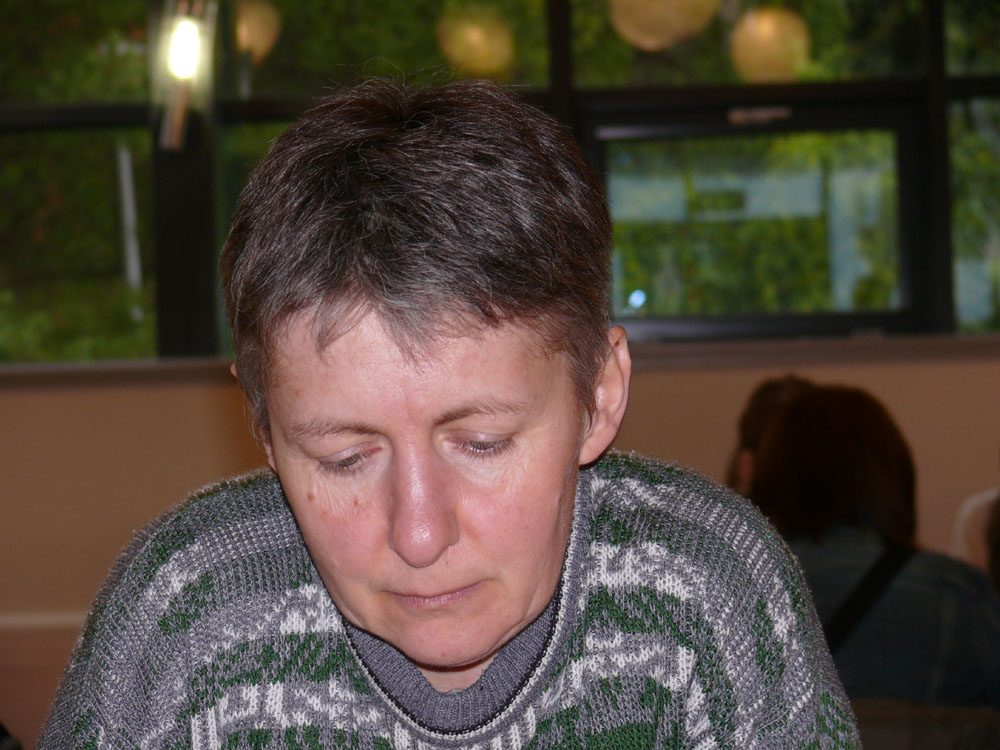
- Kaczorowska in Wysowa-Zdrój, 2007

Personal information
- Born: 21 October 1960 (age 65) Połczyn-Zdrój, Poland

Chess career
- Country: Poland
- Title: Woman International Master (1989)
- Peak rating: 2235 (January 1994)

Barbara Kaczorowska (born 21 October 1960), née Szumiło, is a Polish chess player who won the Polish Women's Chess Championship in 1993. FIDE Woman International Master (1989).

== Chess career ==
From the mid of 1980s to the mid of 1990s Barbara Kaczorowska was one of the leading Polish women chess players. She twice won Polish Junior Chess Championship (1978, 1979) in the category U-20. From 1975 to 1996 Barbara Kaczorowska played 14 times in the Polish Women's Chess Championship's finals and won three medals: gold (1993), silver (1989) and bronze (1985). Also she won 3 gold medals (1991, 1993, 1995) in Polish Team Chess Championships. In 1989 she represented Poland at the Women's World Chess Championship zonal tournament in Brno.
