= Czesława Pilarska =

Polish chess player (born 1966)

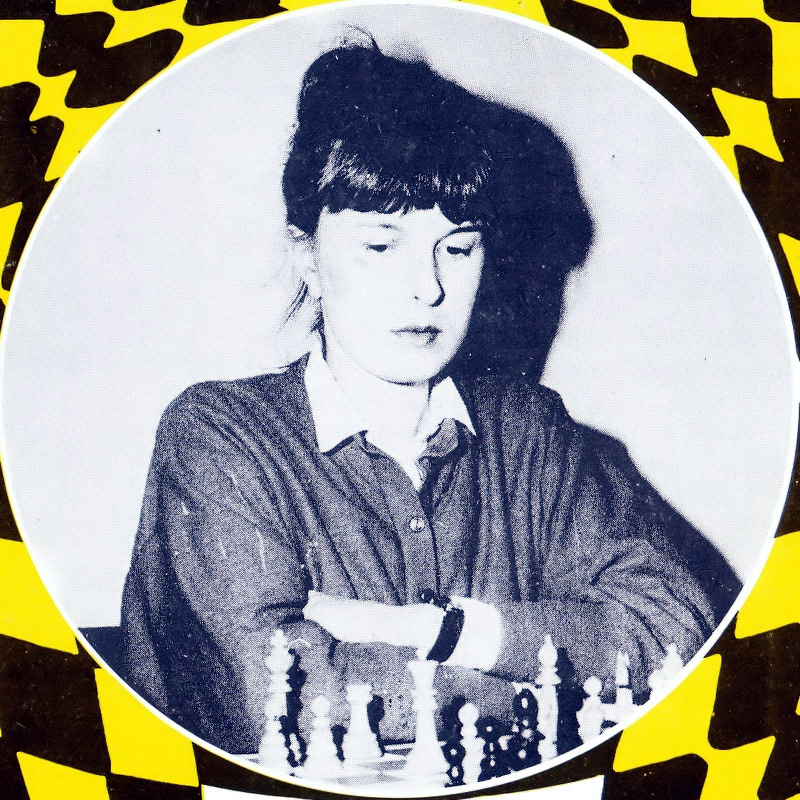
- Czesława Pilarska in 1991

Personal information
- Born: 2 December 1966 (age 59) Kraków, Poland

Chess career
- Country: Poland
- Title: Woman International Master (1993)
- Peak rating: 2210 (July 1993)

Czesława Pilarska (born 2 December 1966), née Grochot, is a Polish chess player who won the Polish Women's Chess Championship in 1991 and an economist. FIDE Woman International Master (1993).

== Chess career ==
Czesława Pilarska twice won Polish Junior Chess Championship (1987, 1989) in the category U-23. From 1988 to 1994 Czesława Pilarska played seven times in the Polish Women's Chess Championship's finals. In 1991 in Lubniewice she won title of national champion. In the same year she represented Poland at the Women's World Chess Championship zonal tournament in Hajdúszoboszló. In 1992 she placed third in the international tournament in Gdynia.

== Scientific career ==
In 1998 Czesława Pilarska ceased active playing in chess tournaments and devoting herself to scientific work. In October 2002 she received Doctoral degree in Economics. Currently Czesława Pilarska working in Microeconomics department in Cracow University of Economics.
