= Apolonia Litwińska =

Polish chess player (1928–2021)

Personal information
- Born: 25 July 1928 Załuże, Poland
- Died: 30 January 2021 (aged 92) Wrocław, Poland

Chess career
- Country: Poland
- Title: National Master (1953)

Apolonia Litwińska (née Osikowicz; 25 July 1928 – 20 January 2021) was a Polish chess player who won the Polish Women's Chess Championship in 1961.

== Chess career ==
In the 1950s and 1960s Apolonia Litwińska was one of the leading Polish women chess players. From 1951 to 1982 she played nineteen times in the Polish Women's Chess Championship's finals. Apolonia Litwińska won four medals: gold (1961), silver (1952 - lost an additional match to Krystyna Hołuj - 1½:4½) and two bronze (1951, 1969). In 1951 she won gold medal in Polish Team Chess Championships. She was awarded the National Master title in 1953.
