= Henrijeta Konarkowska-Sokolov =

Polish–Serbian chess player (born 1938)

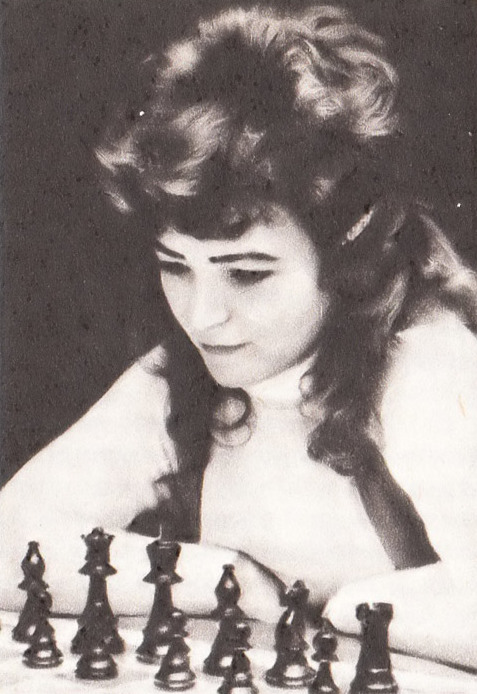

Personal information
- Born: 14 December 1938 (age 87) Inowrocław, Poland

Chess career
- Country: Serbia
- Title: Woman Grandmaster (1986)
- Peak rating: 2180 (January 1975)

Henryka (Henrijeta) Konarkowska-Sokolov (born 14 December 1938) is a Polish–Serbian chess master.

== Biography ==
She was four times Women's Polish Champion (1958, 1960, 1963, and 1964) and two times Women's Yugoslav Champion (1967 and 1971).

In 1961, Henryka Kornakowska took 11th in Vrnjačka Banja (Candidates Tournament, Nona Gaprindashvili won). In 1964, she tied for seventh/eighth place in Sukhumi (Candidates Tournament). In 1965, she married Vladimir Sokolov, and emigrated to Yugoslavia. In 1967, Henrijeta Konarkowska-Sokolov tied for eleventh/twelfth place in Subotica (Candidates Tournament, Alla Kushnir won).

She played thrice in Women's Chess Olympiads (once for Poland and twice for Yugoslavia):

- In 1963, at first board in second WChOlympiad in Split (+5 –4 =1);
- In 1969, at second board in fourth WChOlympiad in Lublin (+5 –1 =3);
- In 1972, at first reserve board in fifth WChOlympiad in Skopje (+2 –0 =5).

She won two individual bronze medals (1969 and 1972).

Konarkowska-Sokolov was awarded the Woman International Master (WIM) title in 1962 and the Woman Grandmaster (WGM) title in 1986.
