= Grażyna Szmacińska =

Polish chess player (born 1953)

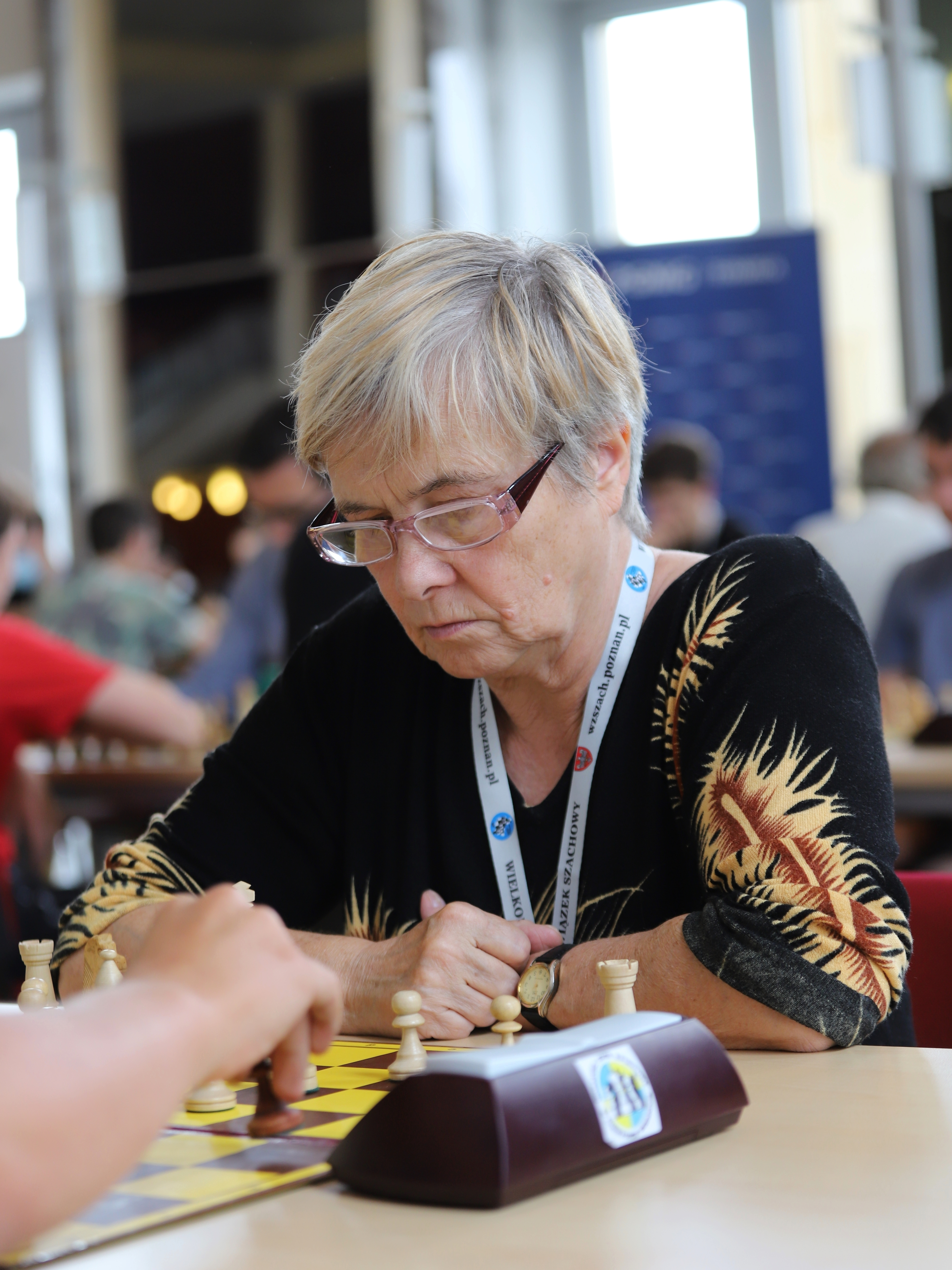
- Szmacińska in 2021

Personal information
- Born: 29 January 1953 (age 73) Brzeziny, Poland

Chess career
- Country: Poland
- Title: Woman International Master (1978)
- FIDE rating: 2024 (October 2021)
- Peak rating: 2315 (January 1987)

Grażyna Szmacińska (born 29 January 1953) is a Polish chess player who six times won the Polish Women's Chess Championship. She received the FIDE title of Woman International Master (WIM) in 1978.

== Chess career ==
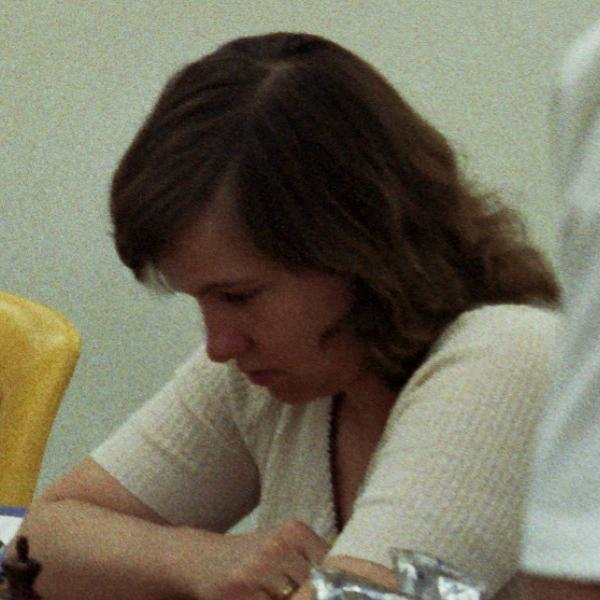
Szmacińska in Chess Olympiad (Dubai, 1986)

In 1970 and 1971, Szmacińska twice won the Polish Junior Chess Championships. Since the early 1970s to the late 1980s, she was one of the leading Polish women chess player. From 1975 to 1989, Szmacinska played 15 times in the Polish Women's Chess Championship's finals and won eight medals: six gold (1975, 1976, 1981, 1983, 1986, 1988) and two silver (1977, 1979).

Szmacińska participated in many international tournaments. She won or shared first place in international chess tournaments in Lublin (1976), Piotrków Trybunalski (1978), Bydgoszcz (1977).

Szmacińska played for Poland in Women's Chess Olympiads:

- In 1978, at second board in the 8th Women's Chess Olympiad in Buenos Aires (+8, =1, -4),
- In 1980, won team bronze medal at second board in the 9th Women's Chess Olympiad in La Valletta (+2, =2, -3),
- In 1982, won individual bronze medal at first reserve board in the 10th Women's Chess Olympiad in Lucerne (+5, =4, -1),
- In 1984, at first reserve board in the 26th Chess Olympiad (women) in Thessaloniki (+3, =1, -2),
- In 1986, at first reserve board in the 27th Chess Olympiad (women) in Dubai (+3, =3, -2),
- In 1988, at first reserve board in the 28th Chess Olympiad (women) in Thessaloniki (+4, =3, -2).

In 1993, Szmacińska ended his professional career chess but occasionally participated in national tournaments. From 2004 to 2006, she won three medals at the Polish National Police Chess Championships, including gold in 2005.
