= Polish Chess Championship =

Chess tournament

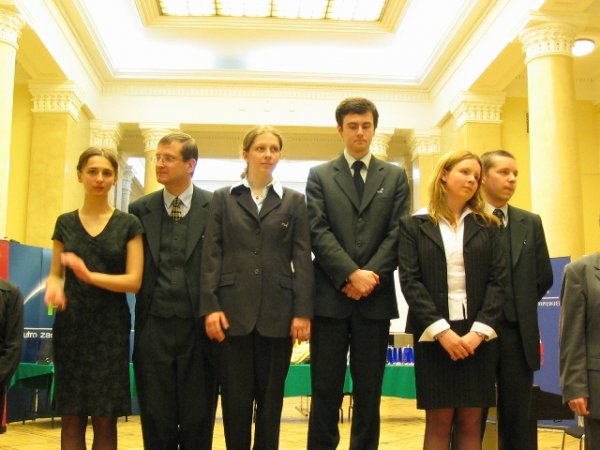
Polish chess champions of 2004: from left Iweta Radziewicz, Michał Krasenkow, Monika Soćko, Bartłomiej Macieja, Beata Kądziołka and Robert Kempiński

Individual Polish Chess Championship is the most important Polish chess tournament, aiming at selecting the best chess players in Poland. Based on the results of the tournament (mainly), the Polish Chess Federation selects the national and subsequently the olympiad team.

The first men's championship took place in 1926, and the first women's event in 1935, both in Warsaw. Between the First and the Second World War, four men's finals and two women's took place. After the Second World War, the tournament has taken part annually, with minor exceptions. In most cases, they are round-robin tournaments, where men's groups are of 14-16 players, while the women's are 12 to 14. There were only four Swiss system tournaments in men's tournament history (1975, 1976, 1977, and 1979) and seven in women's (1959, 1965, 1966, 1975, 1976, 1977, 1978). Twice (1937 men and 1962 women) final tournaments attracted international players, however in 1962 medals were awarded only to Polish women players. Twice women's championship (1960 and 1963) as the Polish crew tournament took place (it is signed by *) in the Winners table).

== Winners ==
#	Year	City	Men's winner
1	1926	Warsaw	Dawid Przepiórka
2	1927	Łódź	Akiba Rubinstein
3	1935	Warsaw	Ksawery Tartakower
4	1937	Jurata	Ksawery Tartakower
5	1946	Sopot	Bogdan Śliwa
6	1948	Kraków	Kazimierz Makarczyk
7	1949	Poznań	Kazimierz Plater
8	1950	Bielsko	Wiktor Balcarek
9	1951	Łódź	Bogdan Śliwa
10	1952	Katowice	Bogdan Śliwa
11	1953	Kraków	Bogdan Śliwa
12	1954	Łódź	Bogdan Śliwa
13	1955	Wrocław	Józef Gromek
14	1956	Częstochowa	Kazimierz Plater
15	1957	Warsaw	Kazimierz Plater
16	1959	Łódź	Stefan Witkowski
17	1960	Wrocław	Bogdan Śliwa
18	1961	Katowice	Alfred Tarnowski
19	1962	Poznań	Witold Balcerowski
20	1963	Głuchołazy	Jacek Bednarski
21	1964	Warsaw	Zbigniew Doda
22	1965	Lublin	Witold Balcerowski
23	1966	Rzeszów	Jerzy Kostro
24	1967	Szczecin	Zbigniew Doda
25	1968	Łódź	Romuald Grabczewski
26	1969	Lublin	Jerzy Lewi
27	1970	Piotrków Trybunalski	Jerzy Kostro
28	1971	Poznań	Włodzimierz Schmidt
29	1972	Wrocław	Krzysztof Pytel
30	1973	Gdynia	Krzysztof Pytel
31	1974	Zielona Góra	Włodzimierz Schmidt
32	1975	Poznań	Włodzimierz Schmidt
33	1976	Bydgoszcz	Aleksander Sznapik
34	1977	Piotrków Trybunalski	Ryszard Skrobek
35	1978	Kraków	Adam Kuligowski
36	1979	Tarnów	Jan Przewoźnik
37	1980	Łódź	Aleksander Sznapik
38	1981	Warsaw	Włodzimierz Schmidt
39	1982	Zielona Góra	Jan Adamski
40	1983	Piotrków Trybunalski	Zbigniew Szymczak
41	1984	Poznań	Aleksander Sznapik
42	1985	Gdynia	Ignacy Nowak
43	1986	Bytom	Marek Hawełko
44	1987	Wrocław	Robert Kuczyński
45	1988	Lublin	Włodzimierz Schmidt
46	1989	Słupsk	Aleksander Wojtkiewicz
47	1990	Warsaw	Włodzimierz Schmidt
48	1991	Cetniewo	Aleksander Sznapik
49	1992	Częstochowa	Jacek Gdański
50	1993	Częstochowa	Tomasz Markowski
51	1994	Gdańsk	Włodzimierz Schmidt
52	1995	Warsaw	Aleksander Wojtkiewicz
53	1996	Brzeg Dolny	Klaudiusz Urban
54	1997	Sopot	Robert Kempiński
55	1998	Książ	Tomasz Markowski
56	1999	Polanica-Zdrój	Tomasz Markowski
57	2000	Płock	Michał Krasenkow
58	2001	Warsaw	Robert Kempiński
59	2002	Warsaw	Michał Krasenkow
60	2003	Warsaw	Tomasz Markowski
61	2004	Warsaw	Bartłomiej Macieja
62	2005	Poznań	Radosław Wojtaszek
63	2006	Kraków	Mateusz Bartel
64	2007	Opole	Tomasz Markowski
65	2008	Lublin	Bartosz Soćko
66	2009	Chotowa	Bartłomiej Macieja
67	2010	Warsaw	Mateusz Bartel
68	2011	Warsaw	Mateusz Bartel
69	2012	Warsaw	Mateusz Bartel
70	2013	Chorzów	Bartosz Soćko
71	2014	Warsaw	Radosław Wojtaszek
72	2015	Poznań	Grzegorz Gajewski
73	2016	Poznań	Radosław Wojtaszek
74	2017	Warsaw	Kacper Piorun
75	2018	Warsaw	Jan-Krzysztof Duda
76	2019	Warsaw	Kamil Dragun
77	2020	Warsaw	Kacper Piorun
78	2021	Bydgoszcz	Radosław Wojtaszek
79	2022	Kruszwica	Radosław Wojtaszek
80	2023	Warsaw	Bartosz Soćko
81	2024	Rzeszów	Radosław Wojtaszek
82	2025	Kraków	Paweł Teclaf
83	2026	Warsaw	Szymon Gumularz

#	Year	City	Women's winner
1	1935	Warsaw	Regina Gerlecka
2	1937	Warsaw	Regina Gerlecka
3	1949	Łódź	Róża Herman
4	1950	Toruń	Róża Herman
5	1951	Częstochowa	Krystyna Hołuj
6	1952	Krynica	Krystyna Hołuj
7	1953	Sopot	Krystyna Hołuj
8	1954	Gdańsk	Władyslawa Górska
9	1955	Szczecin	Krystyna Hołuj
10	1956	Lądek-Zdrój	Krystyna Hołuj
11	1957	Polana	Krystyna Hołuj
12	1958	Łódź	Henryka Konarkowska
13	1959	Katowice	Krystyna Hołuj
*)	1960	Łódź	Henryka Konarkowska
14	1961	Wrocław	Apolonia Litwińska
15	1962	Grudziądz	Anna Jurczyńska
*)	1963	Myślenice	Henryka Konarkowska
16	1964	Spała	Henryka Konarkowska
17	1965	Łódź	Anna Jurczyńska
18	1966	Koszalin	Krystyna Hołuj-Radzikowska
19	1967	Kielce	Elżbieta Kowalska
20	1968	Lublin	Mirosława Litmanowicz
21	1969	Poznań	Krystyna Hołuj-Radzikowska
22	1970	Kielce	Bożena Pytel
23	1971	Piotrków Trybunalski	Hanna Ereńska-Radzewska
24	1972	Lublin	Hanna Ereńska-Radzewska
25	1973	Grudziądz	Anna Jurczyńska
26	1974	Polanica-Zdrój	Anna Jurczyńska
27	1975	Wrocław	Grażyna Szmacińska
28	1976	Istebna	Grażyna Szmacińska
29	1977	Cieplice	Hanna Ereńska-Radzewska
30	1978	Elbląg	Anna Jurczyńska
31	1979	Piotrków Trybunalski	Hanna Ereńska-Radzewska
32	1980	Częstochowa	Hanna Ereńska-Radzewska
33	1981	Poznań	Grażyna Szmacińska
34	1982	Warsaw	Agnieszka Brustman
35	1983	Tarnów	Grażyna Szmacińska
36	1984	Konin	Agnieszka Brustman
37	1985	Sandomierz	Małgorzata Wiese
38	1986	Konin	Grażyna Szmacińska
39	1987	Wrocław	Agnieszka Brustman
40	1988	Bielsko-Biała	Grażyna Szmacińska
41	1989	Poznań	Joanna Detko
42	1990	Konin	Bożena Sikora-Giżyńska
43	1991	Lubniewice	Czesława Grochot
44	1992	Świeradów-Zdrój	Krystyna Dąbrowska
45	1993	Lublin	Barbara Kaczorowska
46	1994	Gdańsk	Magdalena Gużkowska
47	1995	Warsaw	Monika Bobrowska (Soćko)
48	1996	Brzeg Dolny	Agnieszka Brustman
49	1997	Cisna	Joanna Dworakowska
50	1998	Sopot	Joanna Dworakowska
51	1999	Wrocław	Iweta Radziewicz
52	2000	Brzeg Dolny	Iweta Radziewicz
53	2001	Brzeg Dolny	Joanna Dworakowska
54	2002	Ostrów Wielkopolski	Iweta Radziewicz
55	2003	Środa Wielkopolska	Marta Zielińska (Michna)
56	2004	Warsaw	Monika Soćko
57	2005	Suwałki	Iweta Radziewicz
58	2006	Trzebinia	Jolanta Zawadzka
59	2007	Barlinek	Iweta Radziewicz (Rajlich)
60	2008	Kraków	Monika Soćko
61	2009	Bogatynia	Iweta Rajlich
62	2010	Warsaw	Monika Soćko
63	2011	Warsaw	Jolanta Zawadzka
64	2012	Warsaw	Iweta Rajlich
65	2013	Chorzów	Monika Soćko
66	2014	Warsaw	Monika Soćko
67	2015	Poznań	Jolanta Zawadzka
68	2016	Poznań	Monika Soćko
69	2017	Warsaw	Monika Soćko
70	2018	Warsaw	Jolanta Zawadzka
71	2019	Warsaw	Iweta Rajlich
72	2020	Ostrow Wielkopolski	Karina Cyfka
73	2021	Bydgoszcz	Klaudia Kulon
74	2022	Kruszwica	Michalina Rudzińska
75	2023	Warsaw	Michalina Rudzińska
76	2024	Rzeszów	Alina Kashlinskaya
77	2025	Kraków	Klaudia Kulon
78	2026	Warsaw	Oliwia Kiołbasa
