= Magdalena Gużkowska-Nurkiewicz =

Polish chess player (born 1975)

Personal information
- Born: 11 July 1975 (age 50) Lesko, Poland

Chess career
- Country: Poland
- Title: Woman International Master (2003)
- Peak rating: 2235 (January 1996)

Magdalena Gużkowska-Nurkiewicz (born 11 July 1975), née Gużkowska, is a Polish chess player who won the Polish Women's Chess Championship in 1994. FIDE Woman International Master (2003).

== Chess career ==
Magdalena Gużkowska-Nurkiewicz four time won Polish Junior Chess Championship (1989, 1991, 1992, 1995) in the categories U-14, U-16 and U-20. Several times she represented Poland at the World Junior Chess Championship, reaching the best result in 1989, where she ranked 7th in the category U-14. In 1994 in Gdańsk Magdalena Gużkowska-Nurkiewicz won Polish Women's Chess Championship's final. In 1995 Magdalena Gużkowska-Nurkiewicz represented Poland at the Women's World Chess Championship zonal tournament in Nadole. She was awarded Woman FIDE Master (WFM) title in 1995 and Woman International Master (WIM) in 2003.

Magdalena Gużkowska-Nurkiewicz played for Poland in Women's Chess Olympiads:

- In 1994, at first reserve board in the 31st Chess Olympiad (women) in Moscow (+4, =6, -1).

== Personal life ==
She married chess player Maciej Nurkiewicz, who is Polish Junior Chess Championship's triple medalist (1991–97).
