= Adam Kuligowski =

Polish chess grandmaster (born 1955)

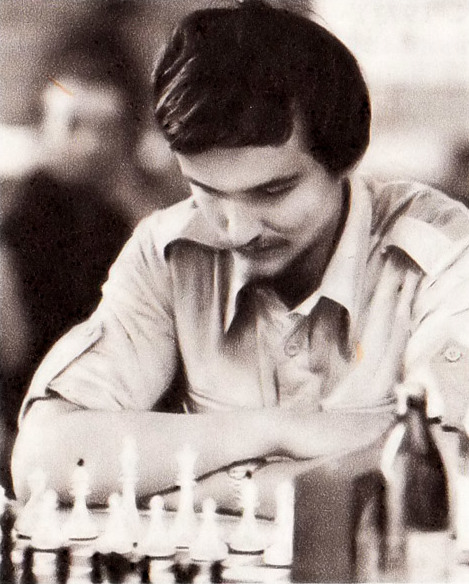

Personal information
- Born: 24 December 1955 (age 70) Warsaw, Poland

Chess career
- Country: Poland
- Title: Grandmaster (1980)
- FIDE rating: 2430 (July 2026)
- Peak rating: 2495 (January 1979)

Adam Kuligowski (born 24 December 1955) is a Polish chess grandmaster. He was awarded the GM title in 1980.

== Tournaments ==
In 1973, he won Polish Junior Championship. In 1973/74, he took 3rd in Groningen (EU Junior-ch; Sergey Makarichev won). In 1974, he took 15th in Manila (World Junior-ch; Tony Miles won). In 1975, he took 6th in Tjentište (World Junior-ch; Valery Chekhov won). In 1975, he tied for 6-10th in Poznań (32nd POL-ch). In 1975, he took 2nd in Dresden.

In 1978, he tied for 1st-2nd with Aleksander Sznapik in Kraków (35th POL-ch), drew the playoff match (2 : 2), and took the Polish Champion title on tie-break. In 1978, he won in Warsaw. In 1980, he tied for 3rd-4th in Łódź (37th POL-ch). In 1980, he won in Warsaw. In 1980, he tied for 2nd-4th in Krosno. In 1980, he tied for 1st-2nd in Niš. In 1981, he tied for 4-6th in Warsaw (38th POL-ch). In 1981, he tied for 3rd-4th in Lewisham. In 1983, he took 14th in Wijk aan Zee (Hoogovens; Ulf Andersson won).

=== Chess Olympiads ===
Kuligowski played for Poland in three Chess Olympiads.

- In 1978, at second board in 23rd Chess Olympiad in Buenos Aires (+8 –1 =4);
- In 1980, at third board in 24th Chess Olympiad in La Valletta (+7 –0 =6);
- In 1982, at third board in 25th Chess Olympiad in Lucerne (+7 –3 =2).

He won individual gold medal at Buenos Aires 1978 and silver medal at La Valletta 1980.

By the late 1980s he was inactive as a chess player and has not played competitively since.
