= Anna Jurczyńska =

Polish chess player (1926–2009)

Personal information
- Born: 4 May 1926 Wieliczka, Poland
- Died: 19 October 2009 (aged 83) Poland

Chess career
- Country: Poland
- Title: Woman International Master (1981); Lady International Master (1977)
- Peak rating: 2189 (July 1999)

Anna Jurczyńska (4 May 1926 – 19 October 2009), was a Polish chess player who five times won the Polish Women's Chess Championship. FIDE Woman International Master (1981).

== Chess career ==
Since the beginning of 1950s to the end of 1970s Anna Jurczyńska was one of the leading Polish women chess player. From 1953 to 1983 she played 28 times in the Polish Women's Chess Championship's finals. Anna Jurczyńska won ten medals: 5 gold (1962, 1965, 1973, 1974, 1978), 2 silver (1956, 1970) and 3 bronze (1955, 1964, 1968). Also she won 3 gold medals (1957, 1962, 1966) in Polish Team Chess Championships.

Anna Jurczyńska played for Poland in Women's Chess Olympiads:

- In 1969, at first reserve board in the 4th Women's Chess Olympiad in Lublin (+3, =3, -1),
- In 1978, won individual bronze medal at third board in the 23rd Chess Olympiad in Buenos Aires (+5, =5, -0).

In 1968 Anna Jurczyńska shared first place in an international women's chess tournament in Piotrków Trybunalski, and in 1974 she shared the second place in the international women's chess tournament in Lublin.

Apart from playing in tournaments classic, Anna Jurczyńska also took part in Correspondence chess competitions and participated in the Sixth Ladies World Championship final (2000–2005). She was awarded the Lady International Correspondence Chess Master title in 1977.

Since 2006 she has been an honorary member of Polish Chess Federation.
