= Władyslawa Górska =

Polish chess player

Personal information
- Born: 10 March 1920 Poland
- Died: 23 April 2014 (aged 94)

Chess career
- Country: Poland

Władyslawa Górska (10 March 1920 – 23 April 2014) was a Polish chess player who won the Polish Women's Chess Championship in 1954.

== Chess career ==
After World War II Władyslawa Górska was leading Polish women's chess player. From 1950 to 1954 she played three times in the Polish Women's Chess Championship's finals. Władyslawa Górska won two medals: gold in 1954 (Gdańsk) and bronze in 1950 (Toruń). In 1952 she finished eighth in Krynica-Zdrój.

In the 1970s Władyslawa Górska participated in ICCF women's correspondence chess tournament's. She played in 2nd Ladies World Championship final (1972–77).
