= Joanna Barczyńska =

Polish chess player

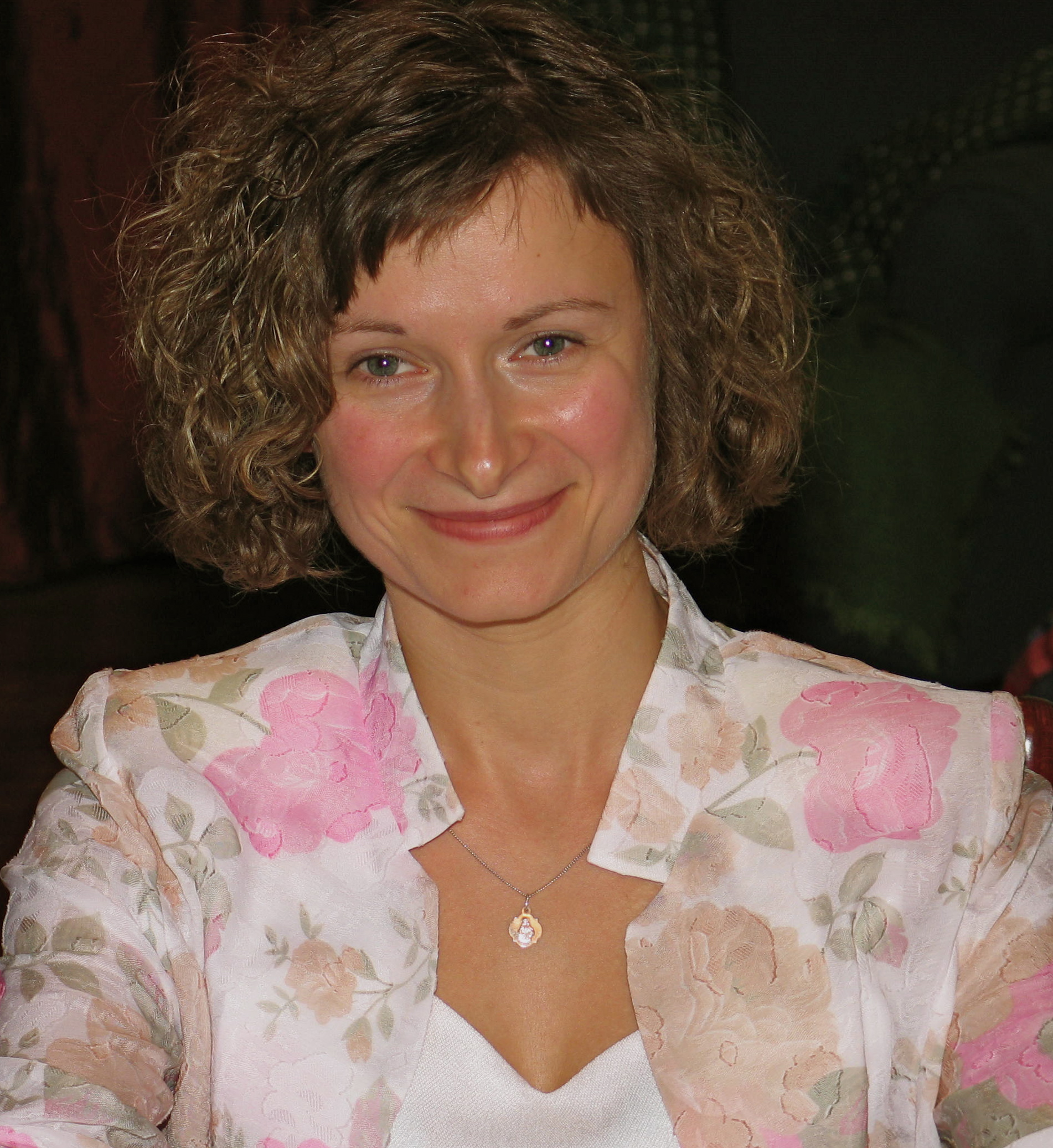
- Barczyńska in Warsaw, 2005

Personal information
- Born: 14 July 1972 (age 53) Kielce, Poland

Chess career
- Country: Poland
- Title: National Master (1989)

Joanna Barczyńska (née Detko, born 14 July 1972) is a Polish chess player who won the Polish Women's Chess Championship in 1989.

== Chess career ==
In chess began playing at the age of 6 years, and the first coach was her father Wiesław Detko. In 1984 she won Kielce Voivodeship Junior Chess Championship, but year later - Kielce Voivodeship Chess Championship.

The biggest success of her career occurred in 1989 in Poznań. In Polish Women's Chess Championship Joanna Detko was one of two theoretically the weakest participants, who do not have even the international ranking, but she won at the age of 16 years the title of National Champion. In the same year, she finished 7th in the World Youth Chess Championship U-18 in San Juan.

Later Joanna Detko did not repeated this success in zonal tournament in Brno (1989) and Polish Women's Chess Championship (1990).

== Personal life ==
In 1991 Joanna Detko began study in Medical University of Warsaw and withdrew from chess tournaments play. In 1997 she graduated Medical University as doctor. From 2005 she specializing in Internal medicine, but from 2008 - in Cardiology. In 2006, she married Doctor of Medicine Piotr Barczyński. They have two daughters: Zofie and Anne.
