= Katarzyna Toma =

Polish-English chess player (born 1985)

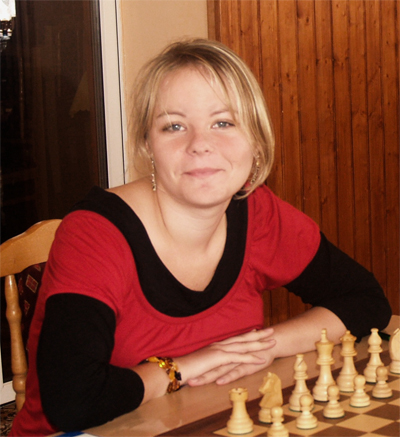
- Toma in Karpacz, 2008

Personal information
- Born: 16 September 1985 (age 40) Częstochowa, Poland

Chess career
- Country: Poland (until 2018); England (since 2018)
- Title: Woman Grandmaster (2012)
- FIDE rating: 2279 (December 2021)
- Peak rating: 2324 (June 2016)

Katarzyna Toma (born 16 September 1985) is a Polish chess player who has represented England since 2018. She holds the title of Woman Grandmaster and also works as a veterinary surgeon.

== Chess career ==
In 2000, she won the Polish Junior Championship (U16) in Wisła, and a year later, won the bronze medal in the final of the Polish Junior Championship (U20) in Brzeg Dolny. In 2001, she first time appeared in the Polish Women's Chess Championship's final and ranked 6th. In the subsequent years, she regularly took part in national championships finals.

As a junior also Katarzyna Toma successfully played in rapid chess (2001 - won Europe Junior Championship in Novi Sad, 2001 - won Polish Junior Championship, 2000 - bronze medal in Polish Junior Championship) and blitz chess tournaments (2001 - silver medal in Europe Junior Championship, 2000 and 2001 - twice won Polish Junior Championship).

In 2003 Katarzyna Toma received Woman International Master (WIM) title. In 2004, she sharing second place in an international chess tournament in Frýdek-Místek and completing the first Woman Grandmaster norm. In 2007 in the same city achieved another success, taking second place in the Pobeskydi Hamont Cup and completing the second Woman Grandmaster norm. Also Katarzyna Toma won the title of vice-champion in Rapid chess. In 2011, she won the women's classification of the traditional Cracovia chess tournament in Kraków, completing the third Woman Grandmaster norm.

Katarzyna Toma played for Poland in European Team Chess Championship:

- In 2011, won team silver medal at reserve board in the 9th European Team Chess Championship (women) in Porto Carras (+2, =0, -2),
- In 2013, at reserve board (Poland III) in the 10th European Team Chess Championship (women) in Warsaw (+5, =3, -1).

Also she won 2 gold medals (2008) in Polish Women's Team Chess Championships.

In 2014, she won the second place (behind Merab Gagunashvili) in the tournament South African Open in the Bloemfontein.

In 2014 Katarzyna Toma was the coach of South Africa women's team at 41st Chess Olympiad in Tromsø.

In 2018, she transferred from the Polish to the English Chess Federation and has since played for the English national team.
