= Krystyna Dąbrowska (chess player) =

Polish chess player

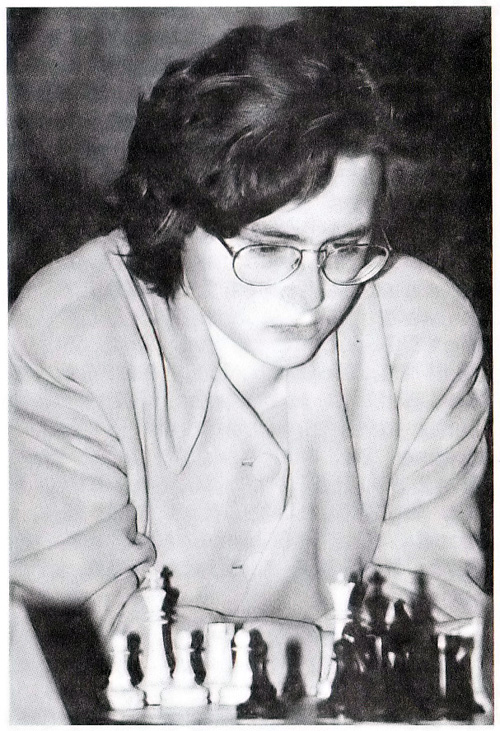

Personal information
- Born: December 5, 1973 (age 52)

Chess career
- Country: Poland
- Title: Woman Grandmaster (1994)
- Peak rating: 2330 (January 1998)

Krystyna Dąbrowska (born December 5, 1973) is a Polish chess player with the title of Woman Grandmaster.

She won the Girls' Under 16 World Youth Chess Championship in 1989.

She won both the Girls' World Junior Chess Championship and the Women's Polish Chess Championship in 1992.

She came 15th in the Women's World Chess Championship 1996.
