= Michalina Rudzińska =

Polish chess player (born 2002)

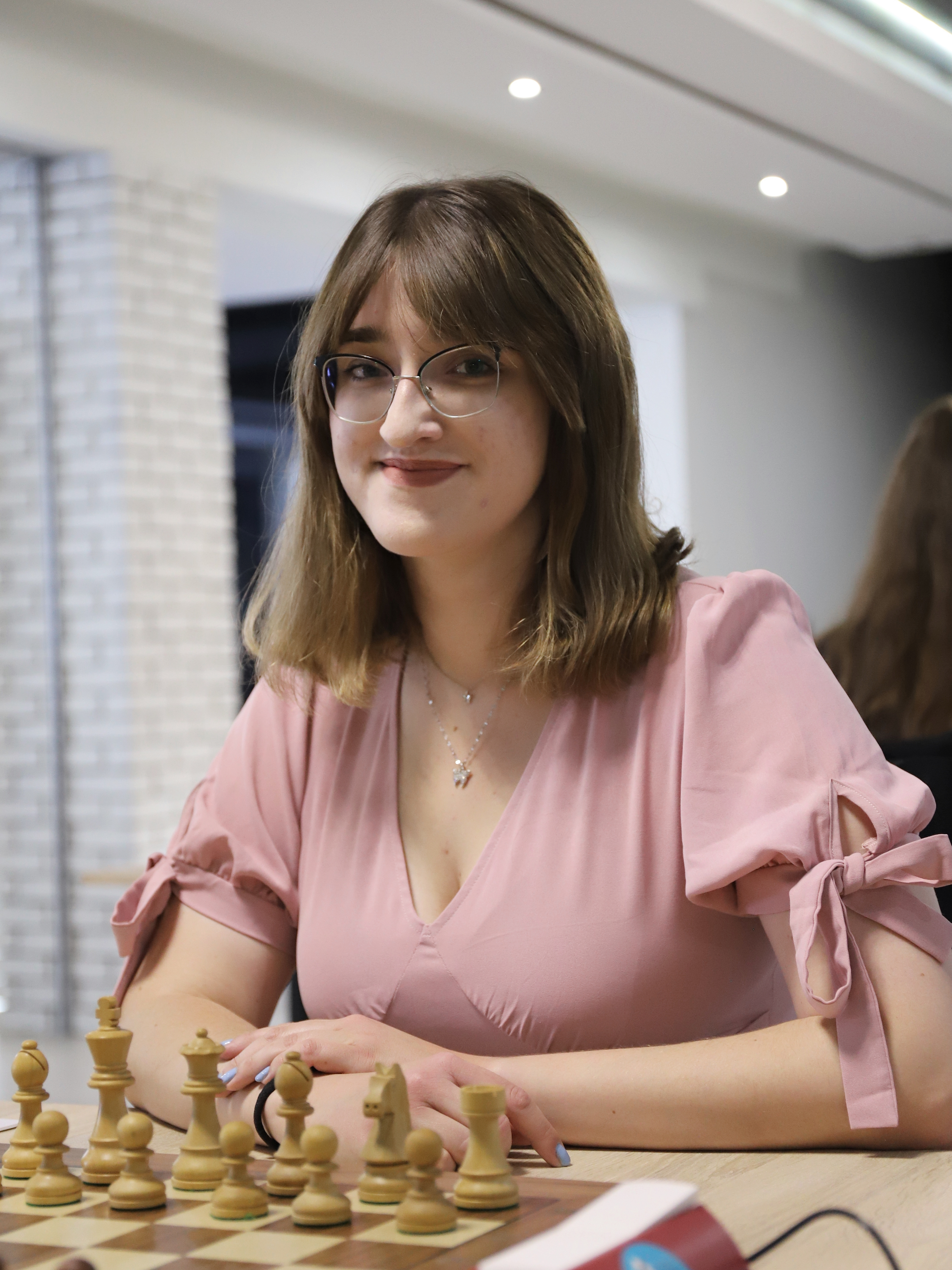
- Michalina Rudzińska, Kruszwica 2022

Personal information
- Born: 22 January 2002 (age 24) Suwałki, Poland

Chess career
- Country: Poland
- Title: Woman Grandmaster (2024)
- Peak rating: 2315 (June 2022)

Michalina Rudzińska (born 22 January 2002) is a Polish chess Woman Grandmaster (WGM) (2024). She is twice winner of Polish Women's Chess Championships (2022, 2023).

== Chess career ==
Michalina Rudzińska became a successful chess player at a young age. In 2009, in Chotowa, she won the 2nd place of Polish Championships in Chess for Preschoolers. Michalina Rudzińska won three medals of the Polish Junior Chess Championships: gold (Międzyzdroje 2010 - U8 group) and two silver medals (Jastrzębia Góra 2018 - U16 group, Szklarska Poręba 2019 - U18 group). She was a two-time medalist of the European Junior Rapid Chess Championship: silver (Tallinn 2019 - U18 group) and bronze (Tallinn 2014 - U12 group), as well as a nine-time medalist of the Polish Juniors Rapid Chess Championship. Michalina Rudzińska represented Poland at World Youth Chess Championship (2 times) and European Youth Chess Championship (4 times), achieving her best result in 2018 in Chalkidiki: 8th place on World Championships U16 group.

In 2018, she won the Open tournament "Star of the North" in Jastrzębia Góra. In 2020 in Pokrzywna Michalina Rudzińska won the title of the Polish Women's U20 Champion, and in the next year of this tournament (Pokrzywna 2021) she won a silver medal. In 2021, Michalina Rudzińska made her debut in the Polish women's championship and ranked in 9th place in Bydgoszcz. The greatest success in her career so far was in 2022 in Kruszwica, winning the title Polish women's champion, while fulfilling the first norm for the title of Women's Grandmaster (WGM). This achievement was exceptional, as in the group of 10 titled players, Michalina Rudzińska had the lowest FIDE ranking and the lowest chess title. Additionally, she won the title after 8 rounds, that is one round before the end of the tournament. In 2023 she defended the title of Polish women's chess champion, winning the championship held in Warsaw. In May 2024, in Rzeszów she ranked in 9th place in Polish Women's Chess Championship.

In 2023, she was awarded the FIDE Women International Master (WIM) title and received the FIDE Women Grandmaster (WGM) title year later.
