= Jerzy Kostro =

Polish chess player

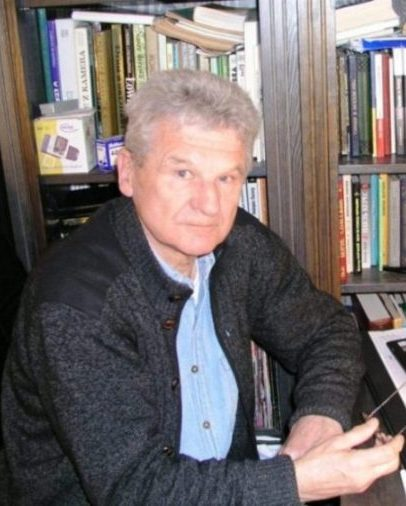
- Kostro in Kraków, 2008

Personal information
- Born: 25 January 1937 (age 89) Moczydła, Poland

Chess career
- Country: Poland
- Title: International Master (1968)
- Peak rating: 2400 (January 1976)

Jerzy Kostro (born 25 January 1937) is a Polish chess player who twice won the Polish Chess Championship (1966, 1970). FIDE International Master (1968).

== Chess career ==
Jerzy Kostro graduated from the Faculty of Metallurgy in Academy of Mining and Metallurgy. In 1957 as a student he advancing Polish Chess Championship's final and won the bronze medal. From 1957 to 1974 Kostro played twelve times in the Polish Chess Championship's finals, and winning another four medals: two gold (1966, 1970), silver (1971) and bronze (1959). He was awarded the International Master title in 1968.

Jerzy Kostro played for Poland in Chess Olympiads:

- In 1958, at reserve board in the 13th Chess Olympiad in Munich (+4, =6, -3),
- In 1960, at reserve board in the 14th Chess Olympiad in Leipzig (+6, =7, -3),
- In 1966, at third board in the 17th Chess Olympiad in Havana (+6, =7, -1),
- In 1968, at first board in the 18th Chess Olympiad in Lugano (+4, =8, -3),
- In 1970, at first board in the 19th Chess Olympiad in Siegen (+4, =8, -4),
- In 1974, at fourth board in the 21st Chess Olympiad in Nice (+6, =9, -2).

Jerzy Kostro played for Poland in European Team Chess Championship:

- In 1973, at seventh board in the 5th European Team Chess Championship in Bath (+2, =3, -2).
