= Miłosz Szpar =

Polish chess grandmaster (born 2002)

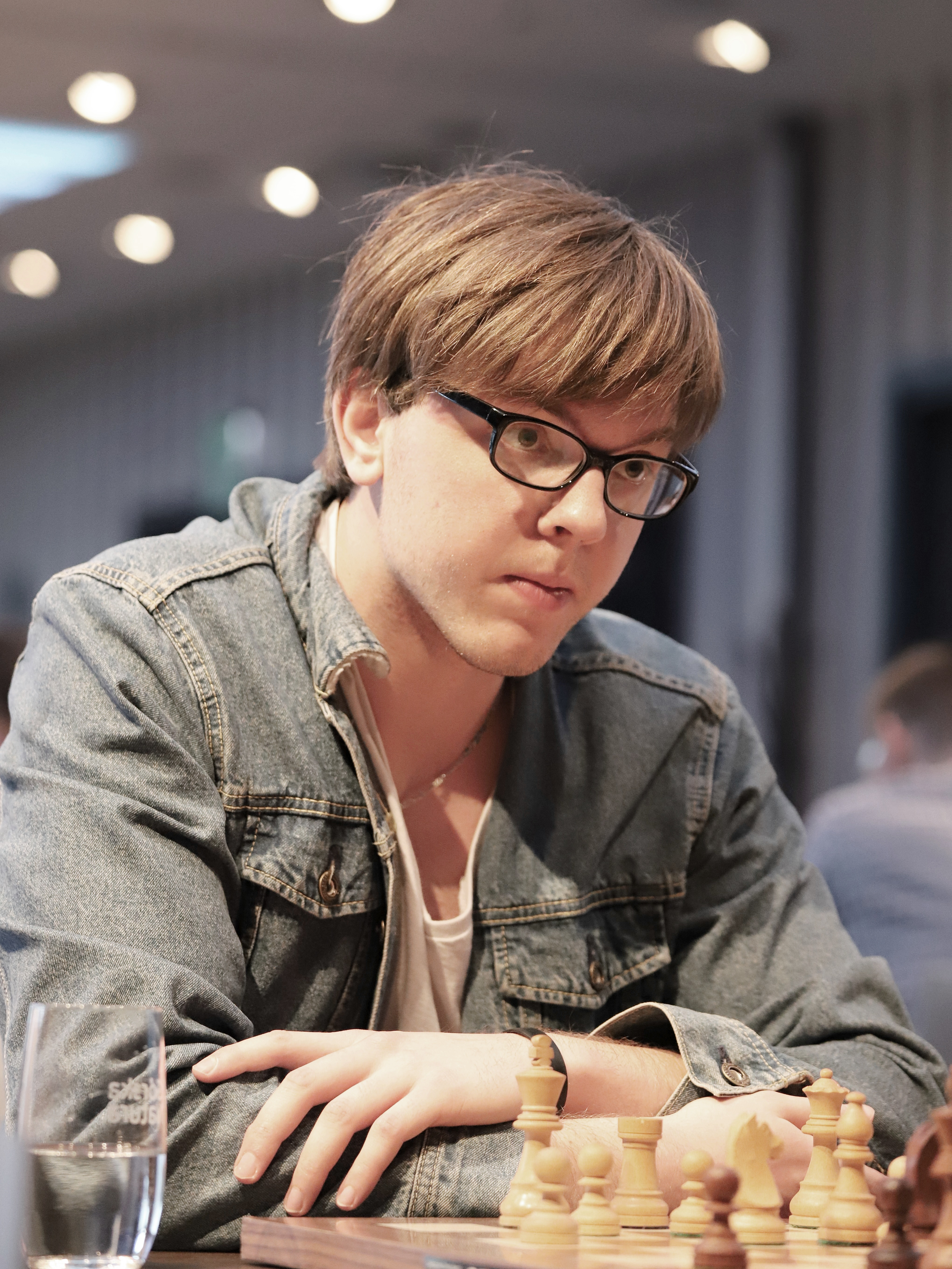
- Szpar in 2022

Personal information
- Born: 5 June 2002 (age 24) Rzeszów, Poland

Chess career
- Country: Poland
- Title: Grandmaster (2025)
- FIDE rating: 2507 (October 2026)
- Peak rating: 2509 (May 2024)

Miłosz Szpar is a Polish chess grandmaster.

== Career ==
In June 2023, he led the Maharashtra GM tournament after the eighth round alongside Vedant Panesar and Rohith Krishna S.

In June 2024, he won the Entebbe FISU World University Championship ahead of Yovann Gatineau and Benjamin Defromont.

He was awarded the Grandmaster title in August 2025, after achieving his norms at the:

- Open Internacional CA Monteolivete in July 2023
- Open Menorca in April 2024
- Trofeo Principado de Asturias in May 2025
