= Hanna Ereńska-Barlo =

Polish chess player

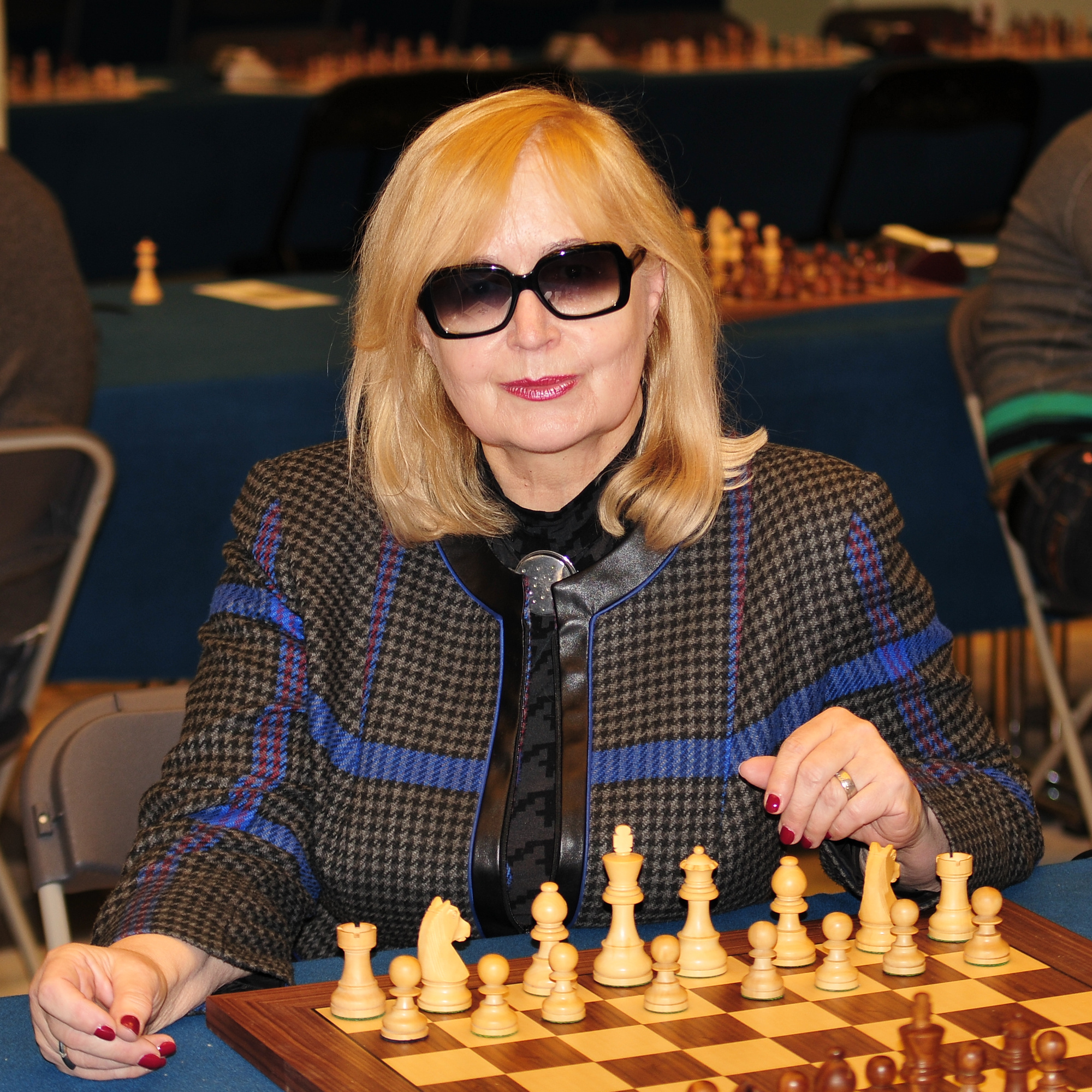
- Hanna Ereńska-Barlo, Warsaw 2013

Personal information
- Born: 12 November 1946 (age 79) Poznań, Poland

Chess career
- Country: Poland
- Title: Woman Grandmaster (1981); World Senior Chess Champion
- FIDE rating: 2241 (May 2011)
- Peak rating: 2310 (July 1992)

Hanna Ereńska (Ereńska-Radzewska), now Hanna Ereńska-Barlo (born 12 November 1946, in Poznań) is a Polish chess Woman Grandmaster.

She was five-time Polish Champion (1971, 1972, 1977, 1979, 1980) and thrice Vice-Champion (1973, 1975, 1984).

She represented Poland in eight Chess Olympiads (1972–1992). She won individual silver medal in the 5th Chess Olympiad at Skopje 1972 (second board, 7½ points of 9 games), and team and individual bronze medals in the 9th Chess Olympiad at La Valletta 1980 (first board, 9 points of 13 games).

Hanna Ereńska-Radzewska was awarded the WGM title in 1981, as the first Pole.

Hanna Ereńska-Barlo won the European Senior Chess Championship at Bad Homburg 2005, and the 17th World Senior Chess Championship at Gmunden 2007.

Her elder brother Przemysław Ereński (born 1934) also is chess player.
