= Marek Hawełko =

Polish chess player (born 1959)

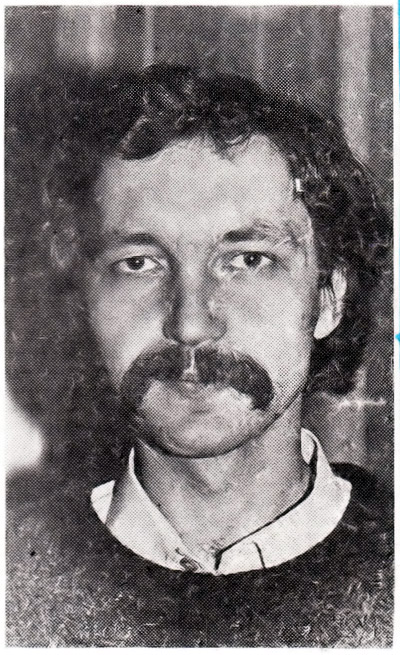
- Marek Hawełko in 1988

Personal information
- Born: 10 August 1959 (age 66)

Chess career
- Country: Poland
- Title: International Master (1984)
- Peak rating: 2460 (January 1987)

Marek Hawełko (born 10 August 1959) is a Polish chess player who won the Polish Chess Championship in 1986. FIDE International Master (1984).

== Chess career ==
In 1967, Marek Hawełko won Polish Junior Chess Championship in Bolesławiec. From 1974 to 1989 he played six times in the Polish Chess Championship's finals. He won gold (1986) and bronze (1987) medals. In Polish Team Chess Championships Hawełko won four medals: gold (1982), two silver (1979, 1980) and bronze (1981). In 1984, he won the international tournament in Rzeszów.

Marek Hawełko played for Poland in Chess Olympiads:

- In 1986, at fourth board in the 27th Chess Olympiad in Dubai (+7, =1, -3),
- In 1988, at third board in the 28th Chess Olympiad in Thessaloniki (+7, =2, -3).
