= Klaudia Kulon =

Polish chess player (born 1992)

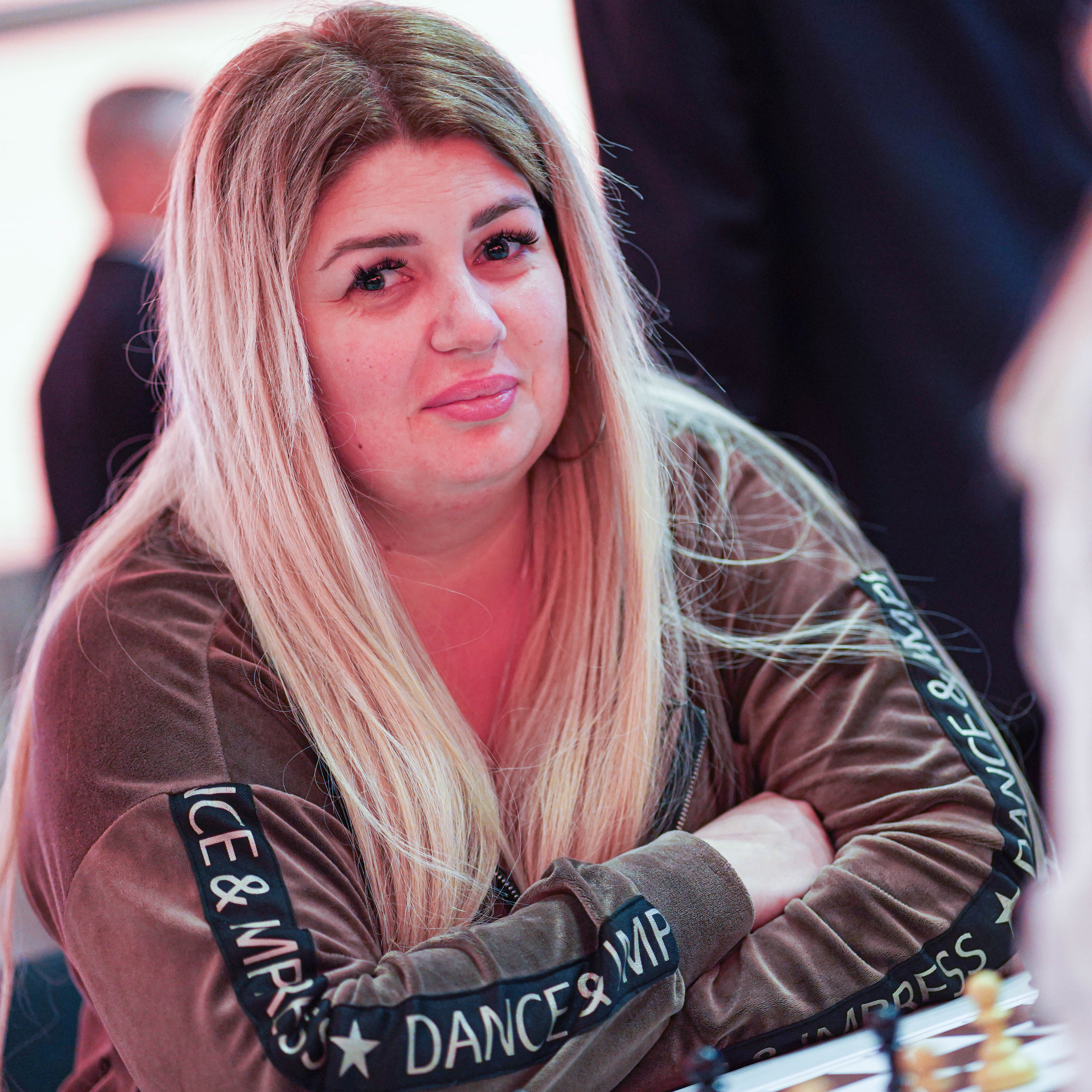
- Kulon in 2023

Personal information
- Born: 13 March 1992 (age 34) Koszalin, Poland

Chess career
- Country: Poland
- Title: International Master (2019); Woman Grandmaster (2014)
- Peak rating: 2415 (August 2024)

Klaudia Kulon (born 13 March 1992) is a Polish chess player. She holds the titles of International Master and Woman Grandmaster, which FIDE awarded her in 2019 and 2014 respectively. She was twice world girls champion in her age category.

== Chess career ==
Kulon started to play chess at the age of 7 in the Koszalin University of Technology chess club. From 2002 Kulon won several times the Polish Youth Championships in different age categories. She won the World Youth Chess Championships twice: in 2004, in the Girls U12 category, and 2006, in the Girls U14. In 2008, she was the runner up, behind Nazí Paikidze, at the European Youth Chess Championships in the Girls U16 section.

In 2007, Kulon competed in the Polish women's championship for the first time, held that year in Barlinek, and finished seventh. She won the Polish women's blitz championship in 2006, 2017, 2018.

In January 2014 Kulon won the Polish students women's championship in Katowice. In April she took the bronze medal in the Polish women's championship in Warsaw. Later in the same month, she became the Polish women's rapid champion in Trzcianka. In August, Kulon won the women's section of the World University Chess Championship in Katowice with a score of 8½ points out of 9. Her result contributed to Poland's gold medal. In December she won the 4th Memorial of Krystyna Hołuj-Radzikowska in Wrocław. In 2015 Kulon won again the Polish students women's championship. In March 2017 she took the silver medal in the Polish women's championship.

=== Team competitions ===
Kulon played for Poland in the European Girls' U18 Team Chess Championship:

- In 2008, won team gold and individual silver at first board in the 8th European Girls' U18 Team Chess Championship in Szeged (+6, =0, -1).

Klaudia Kulon played for Poland in European Team Chess Championship:

- In 2013, at fourth board (Poland II) in the 10th European Team Chess Championship (women) in Warsaw (+4, =2, -2).

Klaudia Kulon played for Poland in Women's Chess Olympiads:

- In 2014, at fourth board in the 41st Chess Olympiad in Tromsø (+3, =1, -2);
- In 2016, at fourth board in the 42nd Chess Olympiad in Baku (+8, =2, -1) and won the silver medal with the Polish team.

Klaudia Kulon played for Poland in World Team Chess Championships:

- In 2015, at reserve board in the Women's World Team Chess Championship 2015 in Chengdu (+0, =0, -4).
