= Kazimierz Plater =

Polish chess player

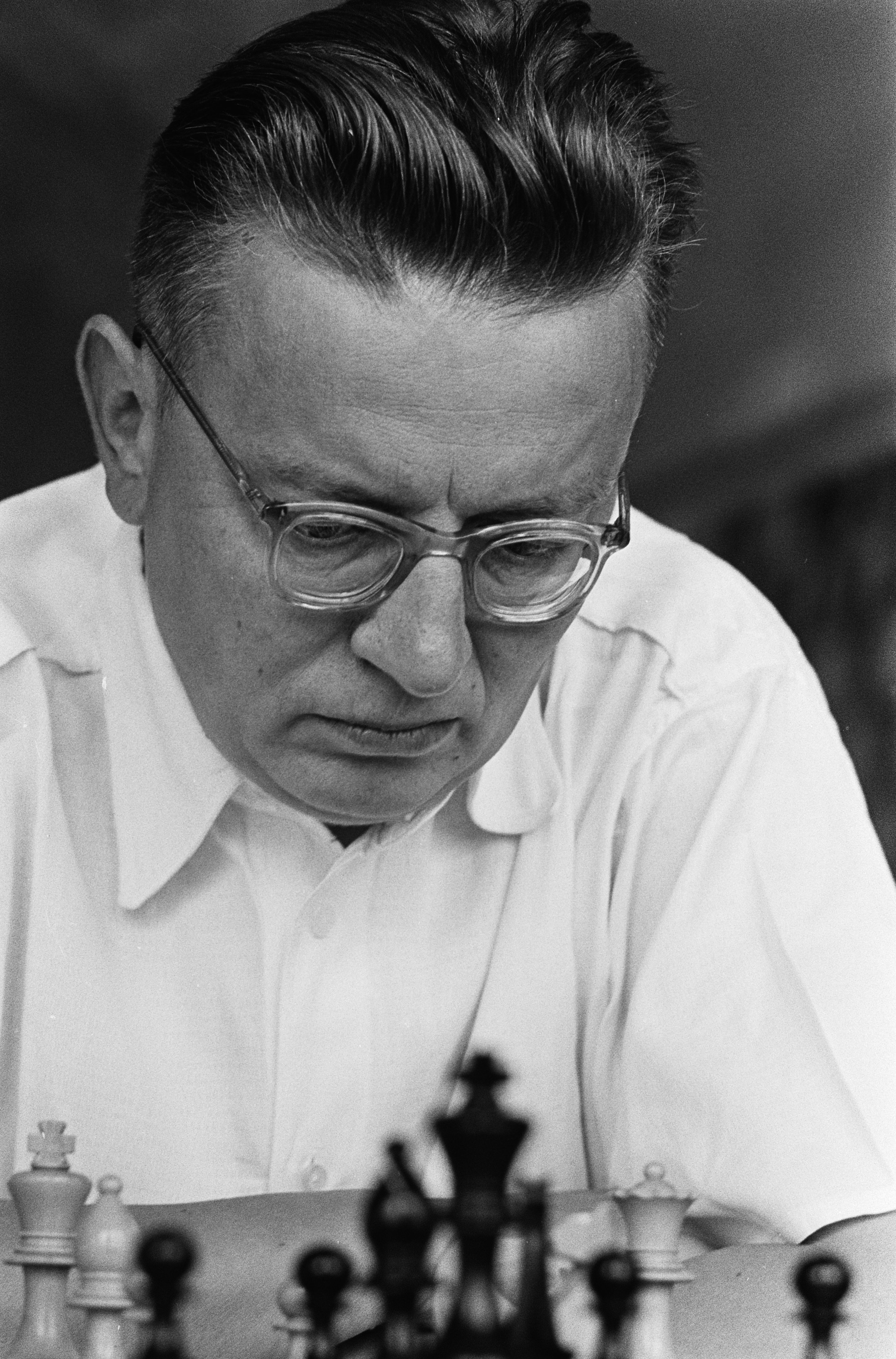
Kazimierz Plater, Amsterdam 1965

Kazimierz Plater (Broel-Plater) (3 March 1915, Vilna – 30 April 2004, Warsaw) was a Polish chess master.

Born into an aristocratic family in Vilnius, he studied in Warsaw where he won the Warsaw County Chess Championship in 1934.

After the Second World War, he participated twelve times in Polish championships (1946–1964). He was thrice Polish Champion (1949, 1956, 1957) and twice Sub-champion (1950, 1963).

In 1947, he took 6th place in Warsaw in a tournament won by Svetozar Gligorić and 12th in the Hilversum zonal won by Albéric O'Kelly de Galway. In 1949, he took 7th in Bucharest (Luděk Pachman won). In 1957, he shared 4th in Szczawno Zdrój at the 2nd Przepiórka Memorial won by Efim Geller .

He represented Poland in Chess Olympiads:

- In 1952, at third board in 10th Chess Olympiad in Helsinki (+2 –3 =8);
- In 1956, at second board in 12th Chess Olympiad in Moscow (+3 –6 =4);
- In 1960, at second board in 14th Chess Olympiad in Leipzig (+2 –4 =3).

Plater was awarded the International Master title in 1950.
