= Zbigniew Doda =

Polish chess player (1931–2013)

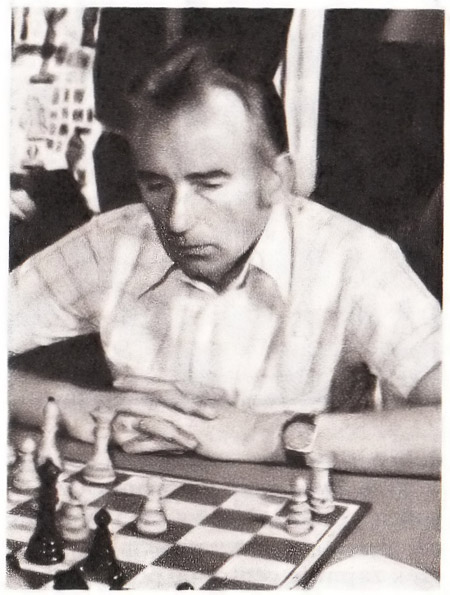

Personal information
- Born: 22 February 1931 Poznań, Poland
- Died: 8 February 2013 (aged 81) Poznań, Poland

Chess career
- Country: Poland
- Title: International Master (1964)
- FIDE rating: 2345 (January 1990)
- Peak rating: 2430 (July 1971)

Zbigniew Doda (22 February 1931 – 8 February 2013) was a Polish chess player who twice won the Polish Chess Championship in 1964 and 1967. FIDE International Master (1964).

== Chess career ==
In the 1960s and 1970s, Doda belonged to the leading Polish chess players. In 1953 he made his debut in the Polish Chess Championship. The first success was in 1960, where he won the silver medal. Polish champion Zbigniew Doda has won twice (1964, 1967), and title runner-up - three times (1960, 1962, 1965). Performances at the Chess Olympiad in Varna and in the tournament in Berlin in 1962 Doda fulfilled the norm of the title International Master that FIDE granted him in 1964.

In 1968 Doda won the tournament B in Wijk aan Zee, and a year later he participated in Hoogovens Wijk aan Zee tournament A and took seventh place. In 1975 Doda won third place in Rubinstein Memorial in Polanica-Zdrój.

Zbigniew Doda played for Poland in Chess Olympiads:

- In 1960, at fourth board in the 14th Chess Olympiad in Leipzig (+7, =3, -3),
- In 1962, at third board in the 15th Chess Olympiad in Varna (+7, =5, -3),
- In 1964, at first board in the 16th Chess Olympiad in Tel Aviv (+2, =7, -4),
- In 1966, at second board in the 17th Chess Olympiad in Havana (+8, =2, -3),
- In 1968, at third board in the 18th Chess Olympiad in Lugano (+5, =6, -2),
- In 1970, at second board in the 19th Chess Olympiad in Siegen (+4, =4, -4),
- In 1974, at second board in the 21st Chess Olympiad in Nice (+3, =6, -4),

Zbigniew Doda played for Poland in European Team Chess Championship:

- In 1973, at fifth board in the 5th European Team Chess Championship in Bath (+2, =1, -3).

== FIDE ratings ==
Elo development
View chart definition.
