= Tomasz Markowski (chess player) =

Polish chess grandmaster (born 1975)

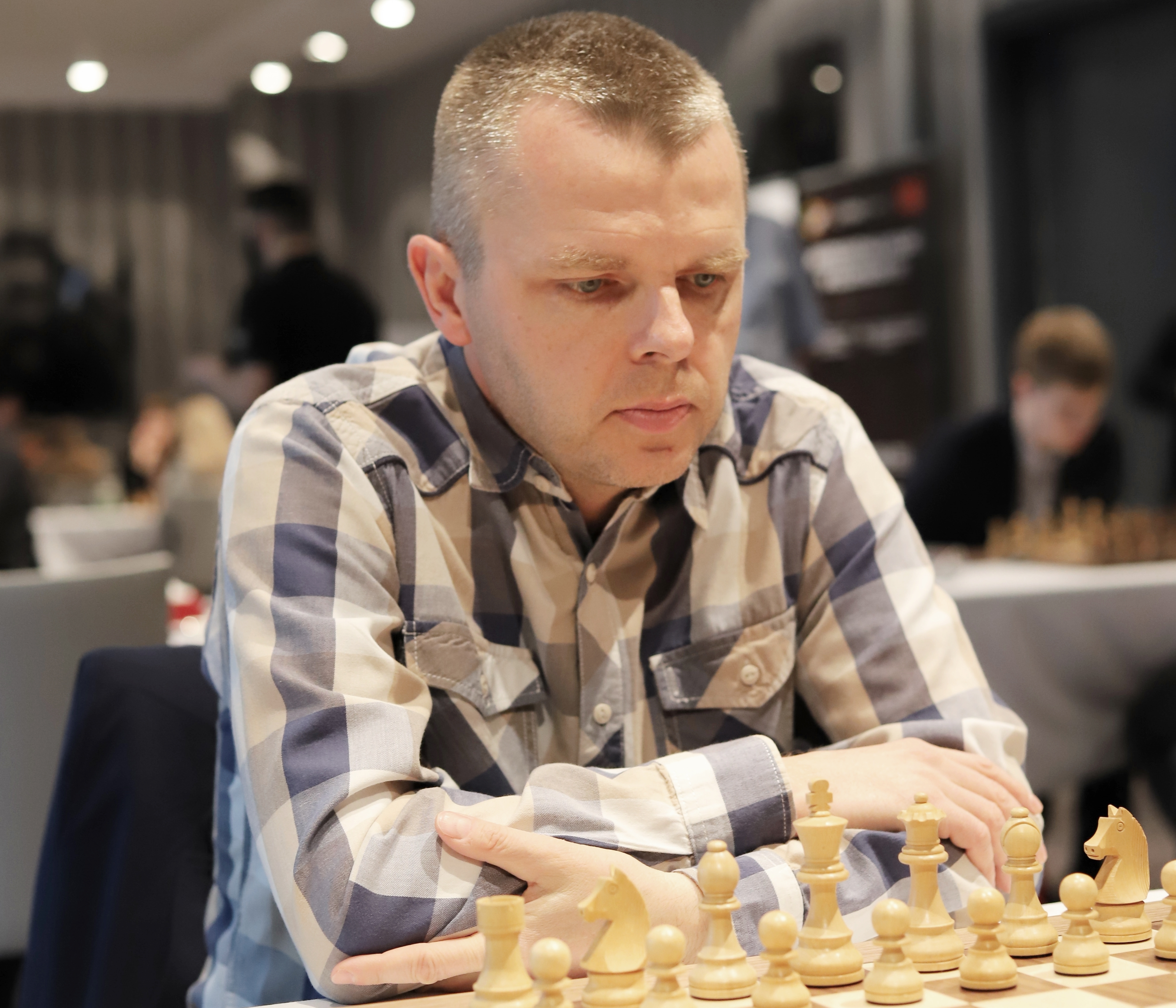
- Markowski in 2021

Personal information
- Born: 30 July 1975 (age 50) Głogów, Poland

Chess career
- Country: Poland
- Title: Grandmaster (1998)
- FIDE rating: 2475 (July 2026)
- Peak rating: 2632 (September 2009)
- Peak ranking: No. 87 (July 2003)

Tomasz Markowski (born 30 July 1975) is a Polish chess Grandmaster.

== Chess career ==
He won the Polish Chess Championship in 1993, 1998, 1999, 2003, and 2007. He also represented Poland five-times in Chess Olympiads. In 2000 he won a bronze medal at the European Individual Chess Championship in Saint-Vincent, Italy. Markowski won at Geneva (1995, 2000) and shared for fourth at the 2004 Aeroflot Open in Moscow.

Markowski was awarded the GM title in 1998.

== Chess strength ==
According to Chessmetrics his best single performance was at POL-ch 60th Warsaw, 2003, where he scored 10,5 of 13 possible points (81%) against 2520-rated opposition, for a performance rating of 2700.

He was in the world top 100 list twice successively in July and October 2003 at rank 87 and 88, respectively, with a rating of 2610.

== Notable games ==
- Tomasz Markowski vs Joel Lautier, 2nd IECC Playoff g/15 2001, King's Indian Attack: Double Fianchetto (A07), 1–0
- Ilya Smirin vs Tomasz Markowski, Aeroflot Open 2002, Sicilian Defense: Kan, Wing Attack Fianchetto Variation (B43), 0–1
- Tomasz Markowski vs Sergei Movsesian, Bermuda-A 2003, King's Indian Attack: Double Fianchetto (A07), 1–0
- Tomasz Markowski vs Lorenz Maximilian Drabke, 5th Individual European Chess Championship 2004, Formation: King's Indian Attack (A07), 1–0
