= Robert Kuczyński =

Polish chess grandmaster (born 1966)

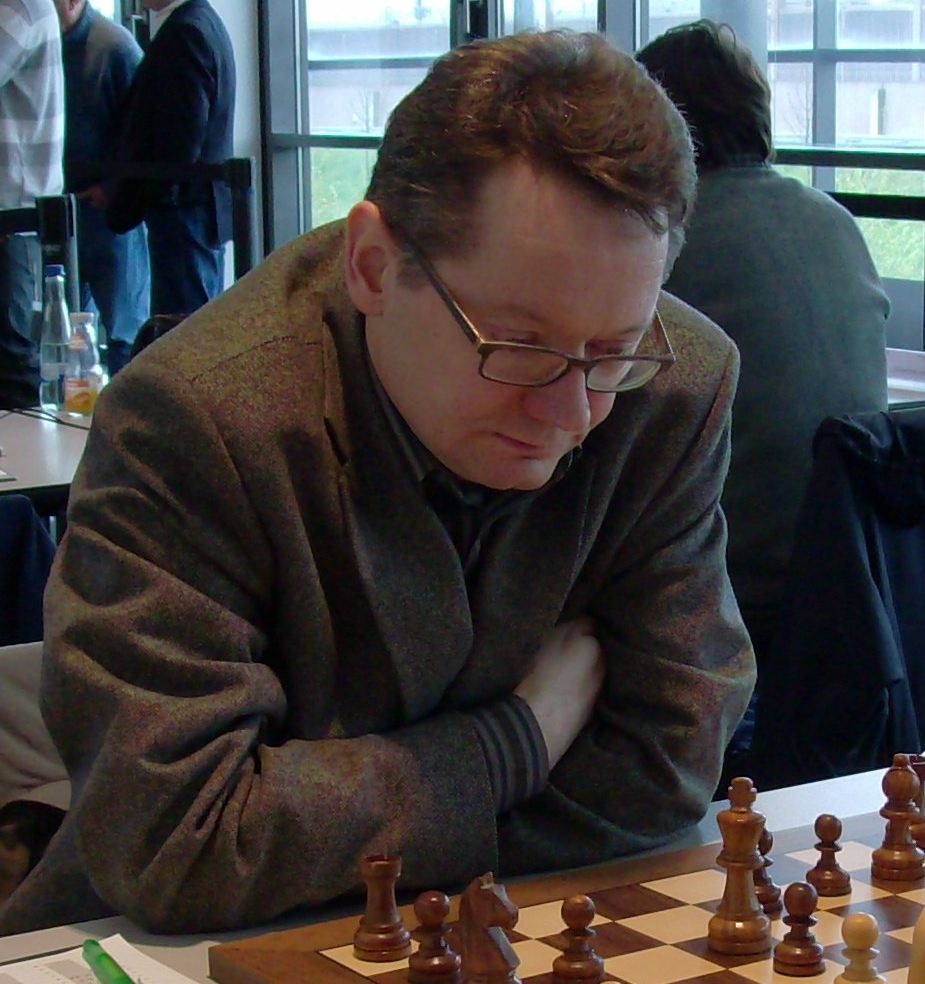
- Kuczyński in 2008

Personal information
- Born: 17 April 1966 (age 60) Jelenia Góra, Poland

Chess career
- Country: Poland
- Title: Grandmaster (1993)
- FIDE rating: 2484 (July 2026)
- Peak rating: 2530 (January 1993)

Robert Kuczyński (born 17 April 1966) is a Polish chess player who won the Polish Chess Championship in 1987. FIDE Grandmaster (1993).

== Chess career ==
Robert Kuczyński twice won the Polish Junior Chess Championship: U-18 in 1980 (Chełmno), and U-20 in 1985 (Wrocław). From 1985 to 2001 he played sixteen times in the Polish Chess Championship's finals. He won gold (1987), two silver (1988, 1989) and two bronze (1986, 1993) medals. In Polish Team Chess Championships Kuczyński won eight medals: seven gold (1989, 1993, 1994, 1995, 1999, 2000, 2001) and silver (1998). He was awarded the International Master title in 1986 and Grandmaster title in 1993.

In 1986 Kuczyński achieved great success, winning the young master's tournament in Oakham (before Viswanathan Anand). In 1991, shared second place (with Oleg Romanishin) in Rubinstein Memorial in Polanica-Zdrój. In 1994 Kuczyński won tournament in Legnica, and in 1999 shared first place in the Swiss-system tournament in Görlitz.

Robert Kuczyński played for Poland in Chess Olympiads:

- In 1986, won individual bronze medal at reserve board in the 27th Chess Olympiad in Dubai (+6, =3, -1),
- In 1988, at third board in the 28th Chess Olympiad in Thessaloniki (+4, =2, -3),
- In 1990, at third board in the 29th Chess Olympiad in Novi Sad (+2, =5, -1),
- In 1992, at second board in the 30th Chess Olympiad in Manila (+3, =7, -2),
- In 1994, at first board in the 31st Chess Olympiad in Moscow (+1, =5, -4),
- In 1996, at fourth board in the 32nd Chess Olympiad in Yerevan (+1, =6, -0).

Robert Kuczyński played for Poland in European Team Chess Championship:

- In 1989, at third board in the 9th European Team Chess Championship in Haifa (+2, =1, -4),
- In 1992, won individual bronze medal at third board in the 10th European Team Chess Championship in Debrecen (+3, =6, -0).
