= Joanna Dworakowska =

Polish chess player (1978–2024)

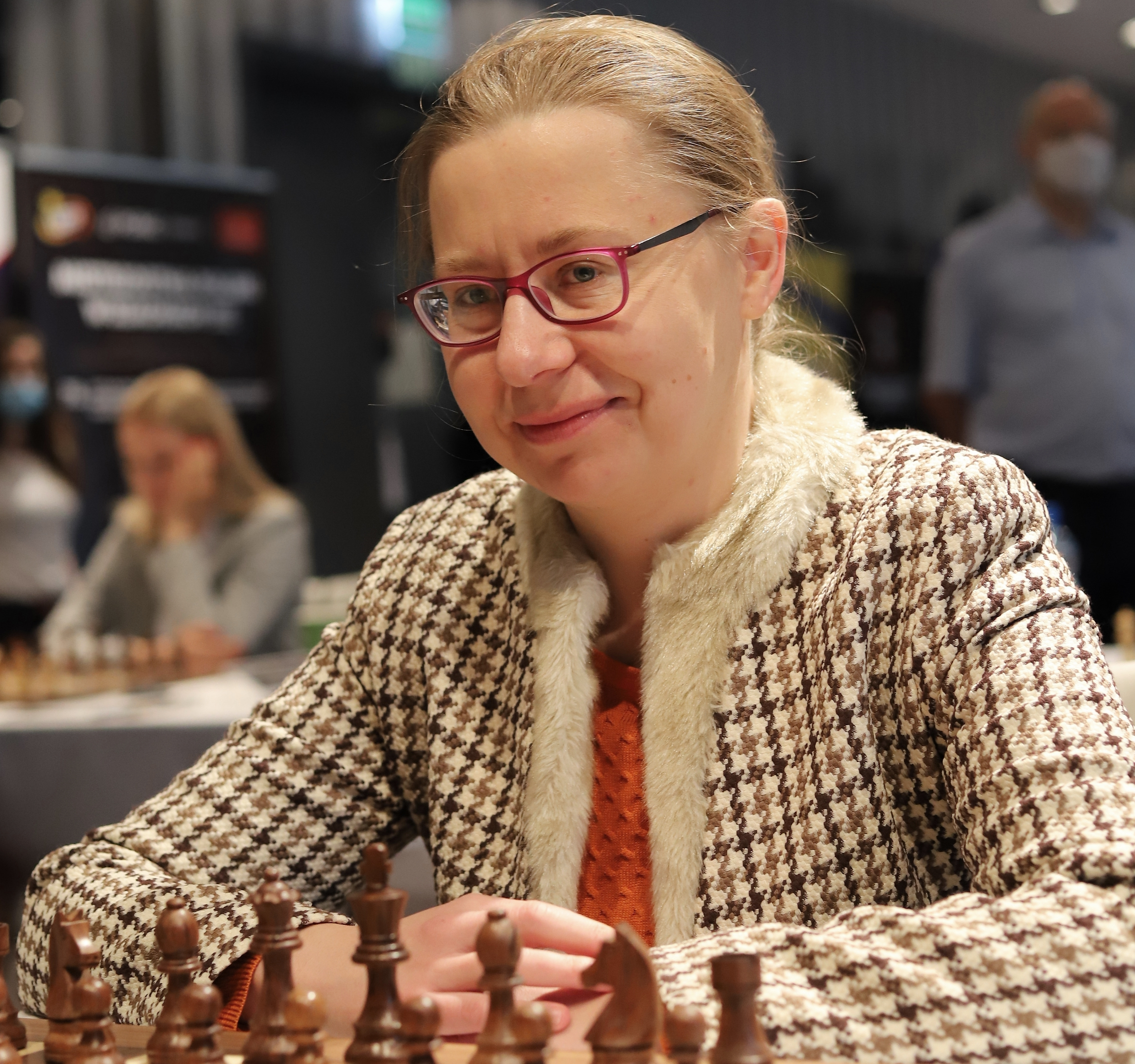
- Dworakowska in 2021

Personal information
- Born: 21 October 1978 Warsaw, Poland
- Died: 13 April 2024 (aged 45) Warsaw, Poland

Chess career
- Country: Poland
- Title: International Master (2002); Woman Grandmaster (1997)
- Peak rating: 2445 (April 2002)

Joanna Dworakowska (21 October 1978 – 13 April 2024) was a Polish chess player. She won the Polish women's championship three times – 1997 (before second place Monika Krupa), 1998, 2001 (both times before second place Monika Soćko), and held the FIDE ranks of International Master and Woman Grandmaster.

== Biography ==
Dworakowska was a member of the Polish women team who won the bronze medal in the 2002 Chess Olympiad at Bled, the gold medal at the 2005 European Team Championship in Gothenburg, Sweden and a silver medal at the 2007 European Team Championship in Heraklion, Greece. She competed in six European Team Championships from 1999 to 2013, winning the team gold medal in 2005, the team silver medal in 2007 and an individual silver medal on the fourth board in 2009.

Dworakowska was born in Warsaw, Poland on 21 October 1978, and died on 13 April 2024, aged 45.
