= Jolanta Zawadzka =

Polish chess player

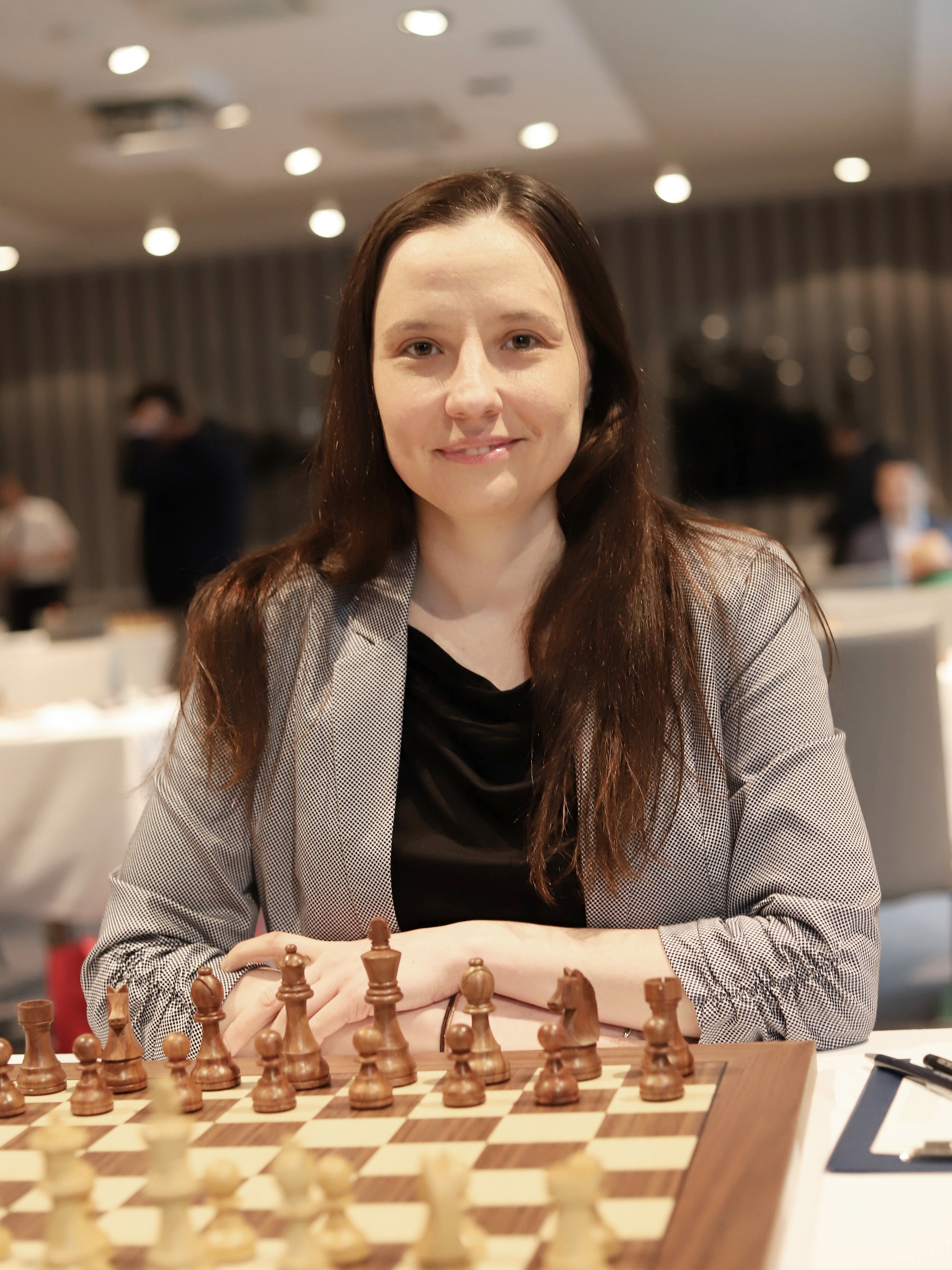
- Zawadzka in 2021

Personal information
- Born: 8 February 1987 (age 39) Wrocław, Poland

Chess career
- Country: Poland
- Title: Woman Grandmaster (2005)
- Peak rating: 2449 (April 2017)

Jolanta Zawadzka (born 8 February 1987) is a Polish chess player with the title of Woman Grandmaster (WGM). In 2004, she won the World Youth Chess Championship for girls U18. She won the women's Polish Chess Championship in 2006, 2011, 2015 and 2018.

She won the gold medal with the Polish team in the European Team Chess Championship in Gothenburg in 2005 and silver medals at the same competitions in Heraklion 2007 and Porto Carras 2011. At the 41st Chess Olympiad in 2014 she was member of the Polish team that became 7th in the Women's section.

She is the sister of IM Stanisław Zawadzki.
