= Agnieszka Brustman =

Polish chess player

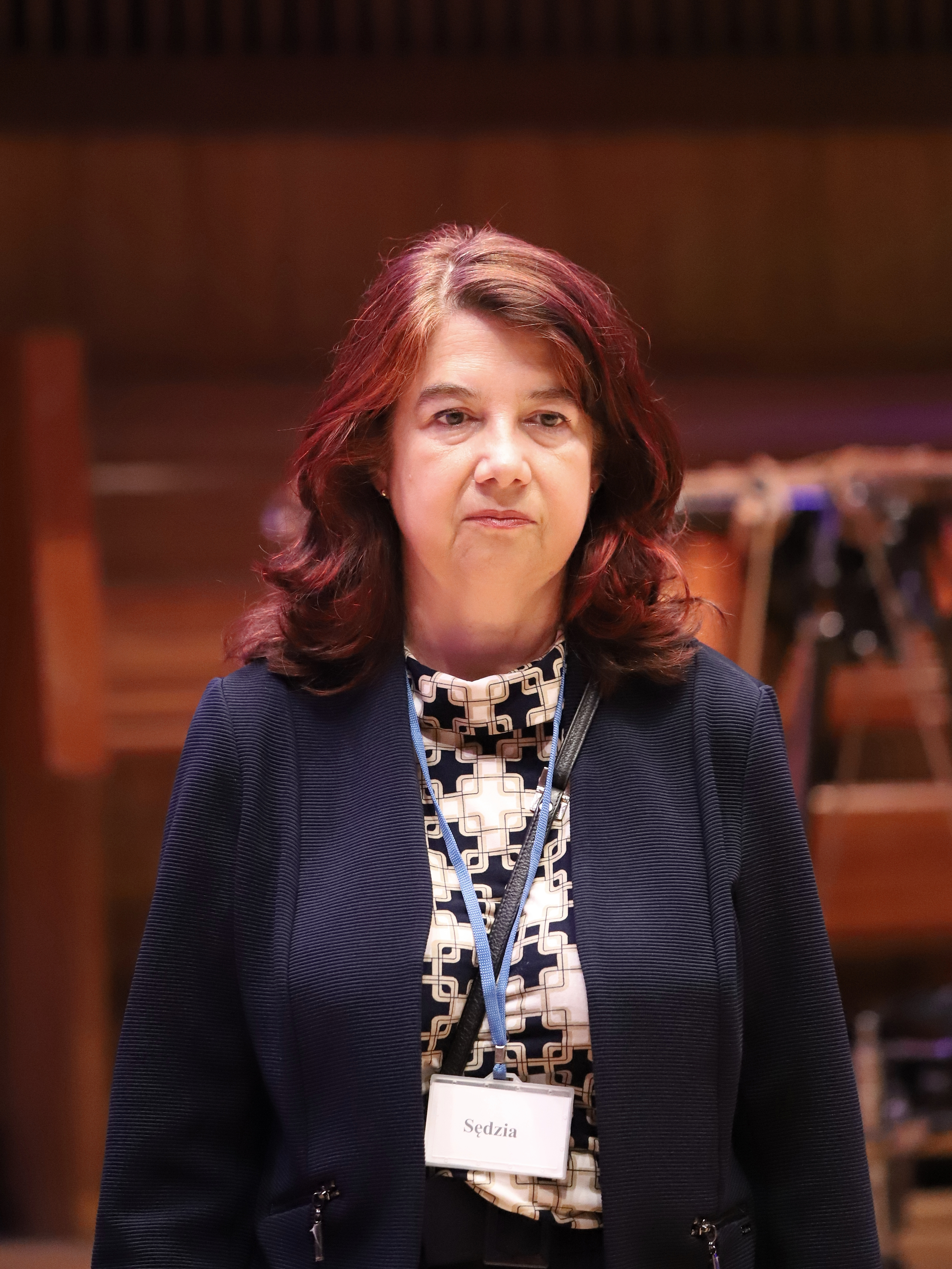
- Agnieszka Brustman, Bydgoszcz 2022

Personal information
- Born: 31 July 1962 (age 64) Warsaw, Poland

Chess career
- Country: Poland
- Title: Woman Grandmaster (1985)
- Peak rating: 2415 (January 1997)

Agnieszka Brustman (born 31 July 1962) is a Polish chess player holding the title of woman grandmaster. She has been the Polish women's champion four times and competed in the Candidates' tournament for the Women's World Championship twice.

== Biography ==
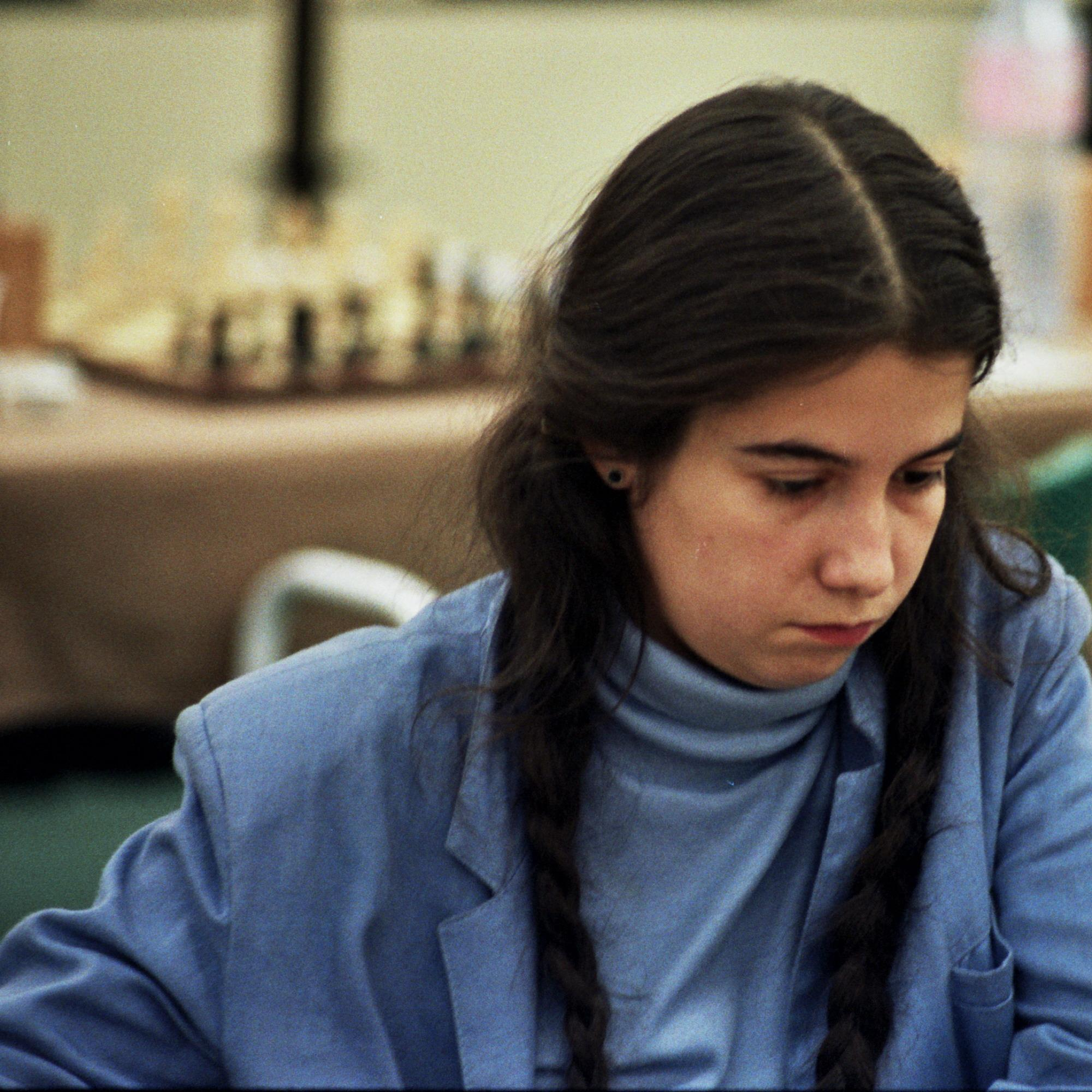
Brustman at the 1984 Chess Olympiad in Saloniki

Brustman was born in Warsaw. She played on the Polish team in nine Women's Chess Olympiads (1980–96). Her best result was in the 1980 Olympiad (Valletta), when she scored 8 points out of 11, winning the individual silver medal on board four and the team bronze medal.

She was European junior girls' champion in 1980 and world junior girls' champion in 1982. Brustman competed in the Women's World Championship Candidates' tournament twice, at Malmö 1986 and Chaltubo 1988.

Brustman won the Polish women's championship four times, in 1982, 1984, 1987, and 1996.

FIDE awarded her the Woman International Master (WIM) title in 1982, and the Woman Grandmaster (WGM) title in 1985.
