= Robert Kempiński =

Polish chess grandmaster (born 1977)

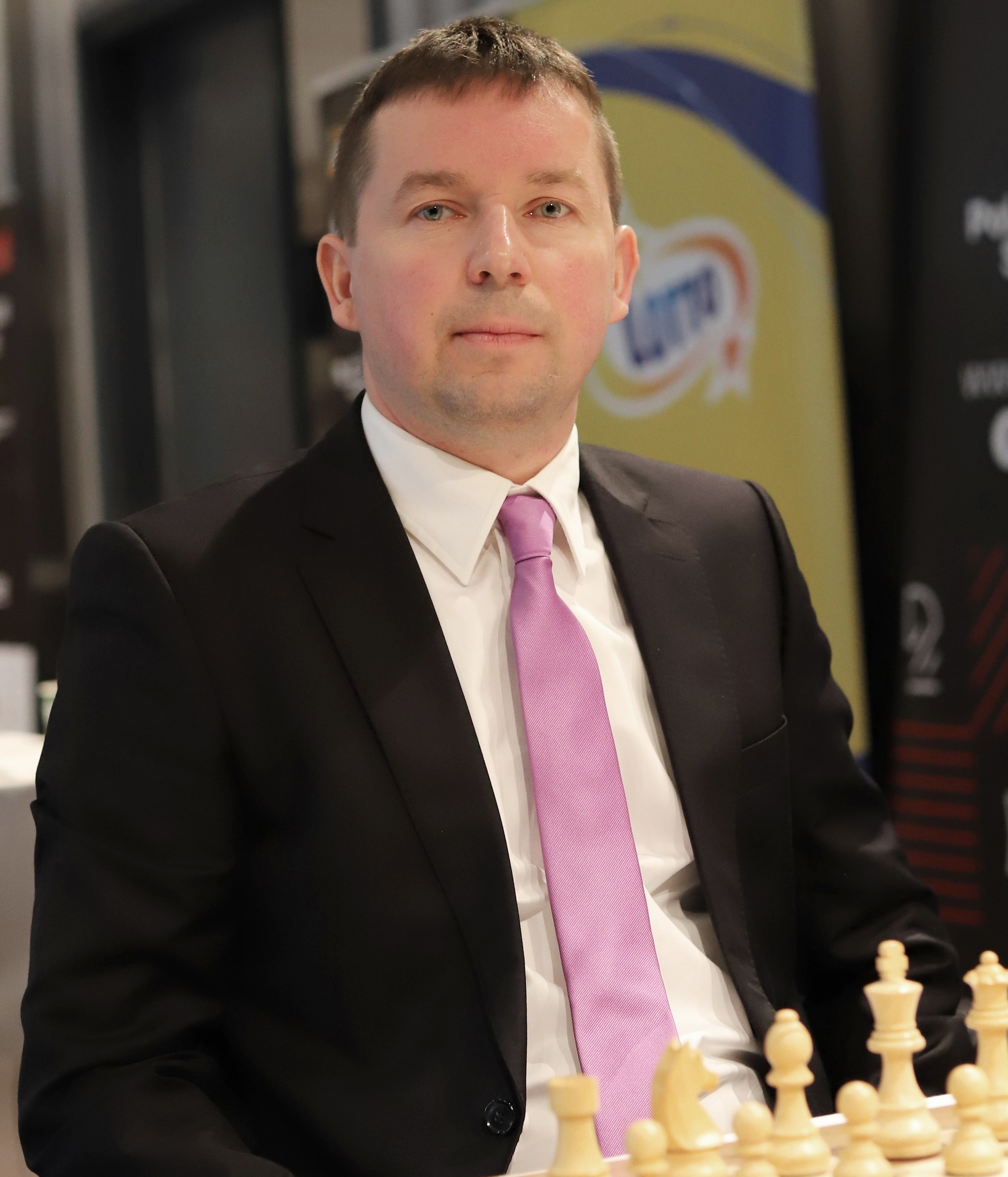
- Kempiński in 2021

Personal information
- Born: 11 July 1977 (age 48) Gdańsk, Poland

Chess career
- Country: Poland
- Title: Grandmaster (1996)
- FIDE rating: 2516 (July 2026)
- Peak rating: 2652 (April 2015)
- Peak ranking: No. 79 (January 2005)

Robert Kempiński (born 11 July 1977) is a Polish chess Grandmaster. He is a two-time Polish Chess Champion.

== Career ==
Kempiński entered his first tournament at the local chess club aged 7 and won easily. At the age of 14 he won the Polish junior championship in his age category, and the year after that he won the Polish junior championship for U20. In the following years he represented Poland in international competitions. He won the European Youth Chess Championship three times: 1993 (U16), 1994 (U18) and 1995 (U18). In 1995 he also won the world title in the World Youth Chess Championship in Guarapuava (Brazil), ahead of Emil Sutovsky. The following year he was awarded the grandmaster title and participated in his first Chess Olympiad, and has since then participated in six chess olympiads 1996–2006, with a 52.1% overall performance. He won the Polish Chess Championship in 1997 and 2001.

International tournament victories include: Zlín (1994), České Budějovice (1995), Lippstadt (1995), Frýdek-Místek (1997), Biel/Bienne (2000), Rubinstein Memorial (2006), Bad Zwesten (2004) Neckar-Open (Deizisau, 2005), Porzellan-Cup (Dresden, 2008). He participated in the FIDE World Chess Championship 2004, but was knocked out in the first round against Alexander Lastin. In August 2010 he finished 6th in the large rapid Open tournament played in Mainz; American Gata Kamsky won the event.
