= Aleksander Sznapik =

Polish chess player

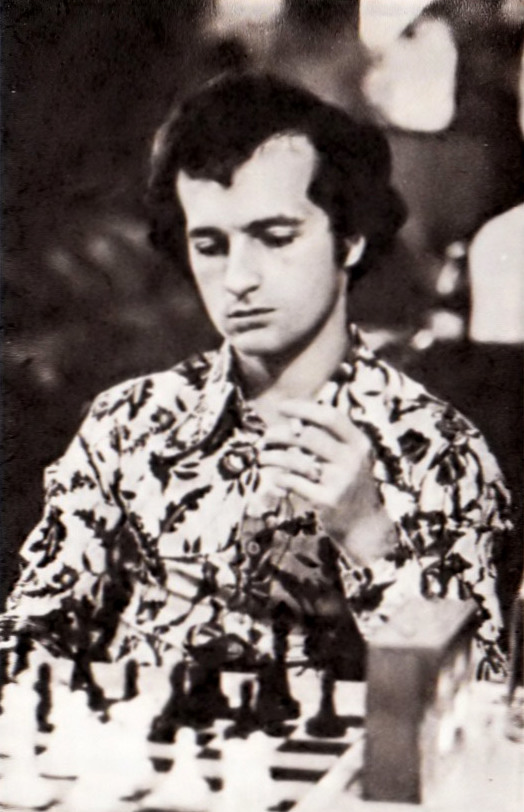

Personal information
- Born: February 10, 1951 (age 75) Warsaw, Poland

Chess career
- Country: Poland
- Title: International Master (1977)
- Peak rating: 2485 (January 1990)

Aleksander Sznapik (born 10 February 1951, Warsaw) is a Polish chess International Master.

He won four times Polish Chess Championships (1976, 1980, 1984 and 1991) and was a Sub-Champion in 1972, 1974, 1977, 1978 and 1981.

He won at Warsaw 1979 and shared first at Copenhagen (Politiken Cup) in 1984 and 1989, shared second at Biel Masters Open Tournament 1987 (Lev Gutman won).

Sznapik represented Poland in nine Chess Olympiads (in 1972, 1978, 1980, 1982, 1984, 1986, 1988, 1990 and 1992), thrice playing on first board.

He was awarded the International Master title in 1977.
