= Włodzimierz Schmidt =

Polish chess grandmaster (1943–2023)

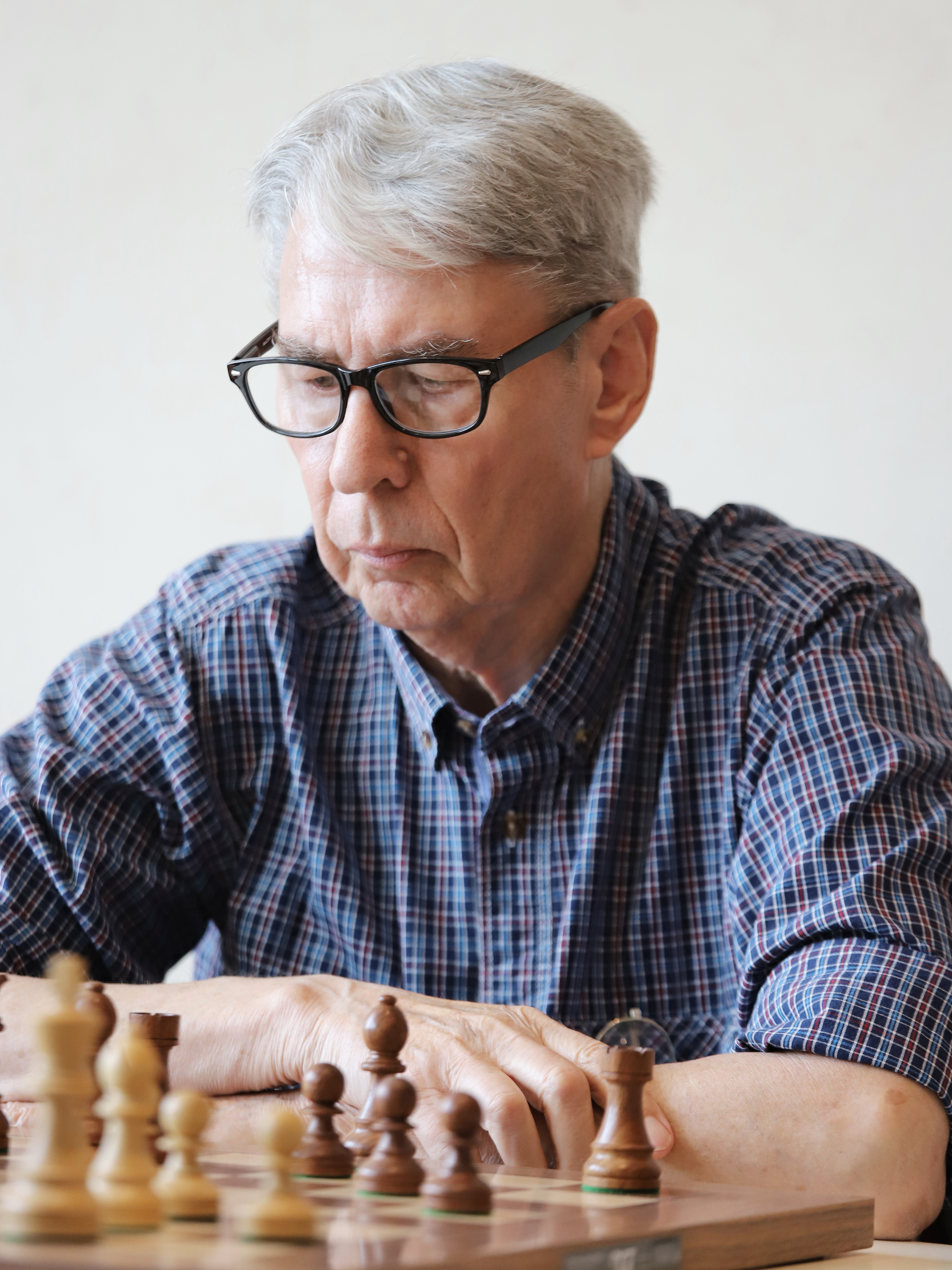

Personal information
- Born: 10 April 1943 Posen, Wartheland, Germany
- Died: 1 April 2023 (aged 79)

Chess career
- Country: Poland
- Title: Grandmaster (1976)
- Peak rating: 2505 (January 1978)

Włodzimierz Schmidt (10 April 1943 – 1 April 2023) was a Polish chess grandmaster.

Schmidt played for Poland 14 times in Chess Olympiads between 1962 and 1994. He was Polish Champion seven times: in 1971, 1974, 1975, 1981, 1988, 1990 and 1994.

In tournaments, Schmidt won or tied for 1st at Lublin 1970, Polanica-Zdrój 1973, Malmö 1977, Bagneux 1980, Polanica Zdrój 1981, Smederevo 1981 and Vinkovci 1986.

Schmidt was awarded the IM title in 1968 and the GM title in 1976. In 2004, Schmidt was awarded the title of FIDE Senior Trainer.

Schmidt died on 1 April 2023, at the age of 79.
