= Krystyna Hołuj-Radzikowska =

Polish chess player (1931–2006)

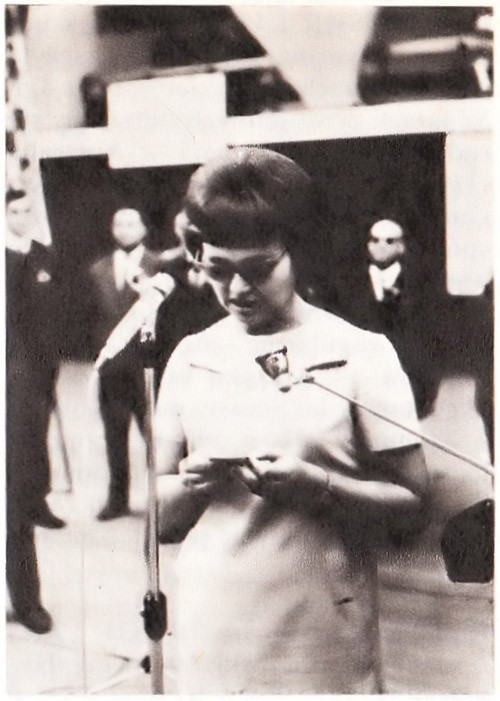
Krystyna Radzikowska

Krystyna Hołuj-Radzikowska (5 February 1931 – 29 November 2006) was a Polish chess player. She was awarded the titles Woman International Master in 1955 and Woman Grandmaster in 1984 by FIDE. Born in Lviv, she was nine-time Polish women's champion (1951, 1952, 1953, 1955, 1956, 1957, 1959, 1966, and 1969).

Hołuj-Radzikowska tied for 15–16th places at the Moscow 1955 Women's Candidates Tournament, which was won by Olga Rubtsova. She tied for 7–8th at the Ohrid 1971 Interzonal Tournament, won by Nana Alexandria.

She played for Poland five times in the Women's Chess Olympiad:

- in 1957, at 1st board in the 1st Women's Chess Olympiad in Emmen, the Netherlands (+9−2=0);
- in 1963, at 2nd board in the 2nd Women's Chess Olympiad in Split (+2−4=2);
- in 1966, at 1st board in the 3rd Women's Chess Olympiad in Oberhausen (+3−6=2);
- in 1969, at 1st board in the 4th Women's Chess Olympiad in Lublin (+3−3=4);
- in 1972, at 1st board in the 5th Women's Chess Olympiad in Skopje (+5−1=3).

Hołuj-Radzikowska won the individual gold medal on board one in Emmen 1957.

A chess tournament in her memory has been held annually since 2011 in Wrocław, Poland.
