= Iweta Rajlich =

Polish chess player (born 1981)

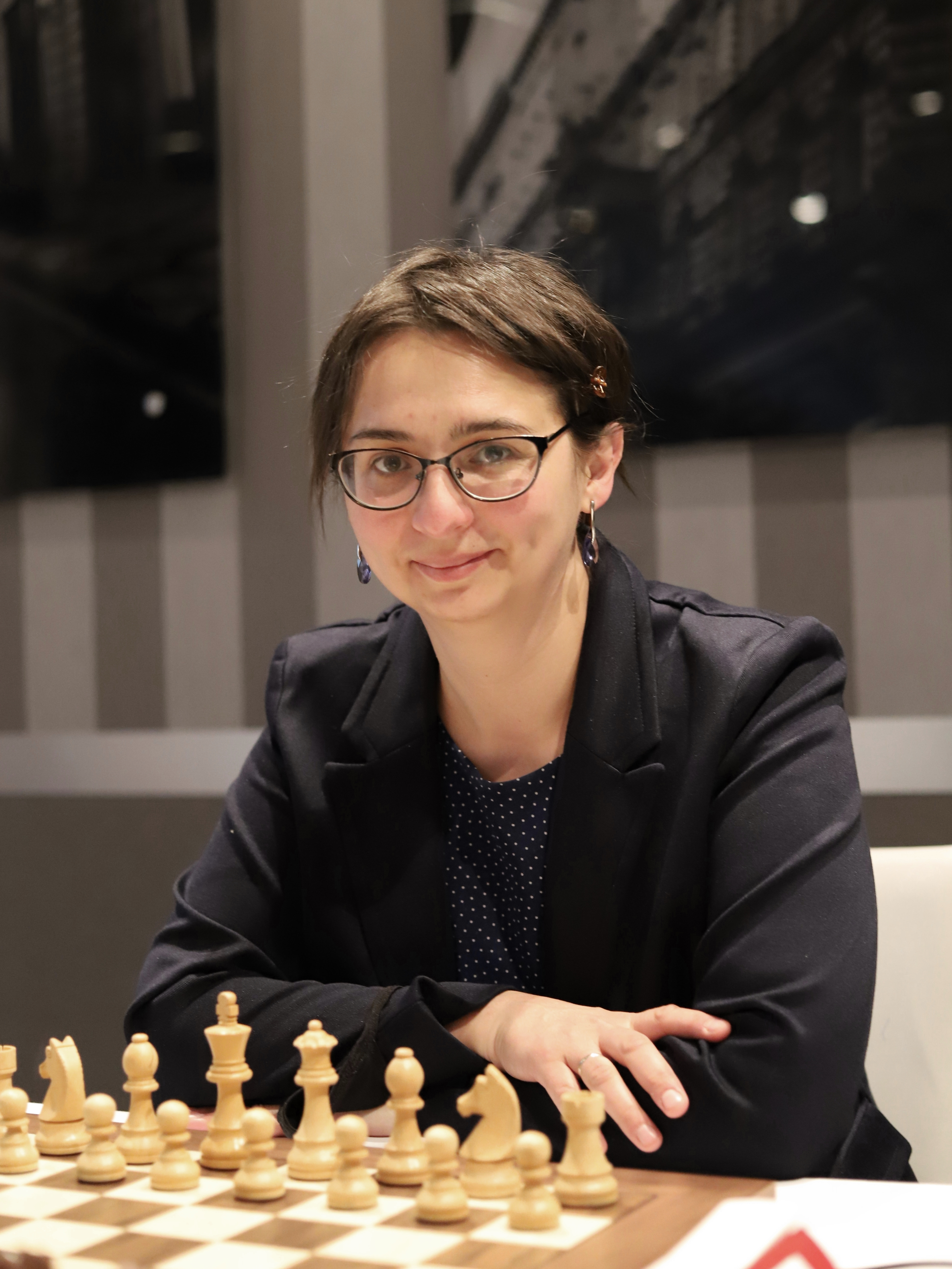
- Iweta Rajlich, Bydgoszcz 2021

Personal information
- Born: 16 March 1981 (age 45) Warsaw, Poland

Chess career
- Country: Poland
- Title: International Master (2002); Woman Grandmaster (1997)
- FIDE rating: 2379 (August 2021)
- Peak rating: 2465 (September 2009)

Iweta Rajlich (born Radziewicz, 16 March 1981) is a Polish chess International Master and Woman Grandmaster, multiple winner of Women Chess Championships of Poland. She married Vasik Rajlich, the author of Rybka, on 19 August 2006. Iweta is the tester for the program. The couple presently live in Warsaw, Poland.
