= Lublin Grandmaster Tournament =

Annual chess tournament

The Lublin Grandmaster Tournament (in full Międzynarodowy Arcymistrzowski Turniej Szachowy im. Unii Lubelskiej meaning International Grandmasters' Tournament the Lublin Union Memorial) is an annual chess tournament, set up primarily as part of the city's bid to become the 2016 European Capital of Culture, which eventually went to Wroclaw instead. The venue is the Crown Tribunal in Lublin.

== Lublin Union Memorial 2009 ==
The 2009 tournament was a ten-player single round robin held between 29 May and 6 June. Boris Grachev won the event, half a point ahead of Roiz and Wojtaszek.

Position	Participant	Points
1	Boris Grachev (RUS)	6
2-3	Michael Roiz (ISR)	5.5
2-3	Radosław Wojtaszek (POL)	5.5
4	Bartosz Soćko (POL)	5
5	Sergei Zhigalko (BLR)	4.5
6-9	Mateusz Bartel (POL)	4
6-9	Marcin Dziuba (POL)	4
6-9	Grzegorz Gajewski (POL)	4
6-9	Igor Khenkin (GER)	4
10	Vadim Malakhatko (BEL)	2.5

== Lublin Union Memorial 2010 ==
The 2010 edition was held again as a ten-player round robin and took place from 9 to 18 May. The tournament was won on Sonnenborn-Berger tiebreak by Bartłomiej Macieja, ahead of defending champion Grachev and Mateusz Bartel.

	Player	Country	Rating	Points
1	Bartłomiej Macieja	Poland	2618	5,5
2	Boris Grachev	Russia	2667	5,5
3	Mateusz Bartel	Poland	2618	5,5
4	Bartosz Soćko	Poland	2644	5
5	Georg Meier	Germany	2638	5
6	Marcin Dziuba	Poland	2576	4,5
7	Vladimir Baklan	Ukraine	2633	4,5
8	Sergei Tiviakov	Netherlands	2634	4
9	Igor Kurnosov	Russia	2680	3,5
10	Dariusz Swiercz	Poland	2501	2

== Lublin Union Memorial 2011 ==
The format changed slightly for the third edition, held between 15–21 May 2011. While still held as a single round robin, the field was shrunk to eight players from ten in the last edition. Top seed Shirov won, half a point ahead of Grachev and Zhigalko.

	Player	Country	Rating	Points
1	Alexei Shirov	Spain	2709	5
2	Boris Grachev	Russia	2669	4.5
3	Sergei Zhigalko	Belarus	2679	4.5
4	Michael Roiz	Israel	2660	4
5	Krishnan Sasikiran	India	2676	4
6	Bartosz Socko	Poland	2654	2
7	Radoslav Wojtaszek	Poland	2721	2
8	Evgeny Alekseev	Russia	2673	2

== Lublin Union Memorial 2012 ==
For the fourth edition, the format was changed to a double Scheveningen match between Ukraine and Poland, where each member of one team plays twice against all members of the other team, one round being standard time control and the second being rapid games. The Ukraine team won both 15.5-10.5 in the standard time control and 13.5-11.5 in the rapid. A two-game regular blitz match was held between the teams after the rapid section.

Classical time control: Ukraine 15.5 - Poland 10.5

No.	Player	Rating	U1	U2	U3	U4	U5	P1	P2	P3	P4	P5	Total
U1	Zahar Efimenko	2689	X	X	X	X	X	0	0.5	0.5	1	1	3
U2	Anton Korobov	2678	X	X	X	X	X	1	1	1	0	0	3
U3	Yuriy Kryvoruchko	2676	X	X	X	X	X	1	0.5	0.5	0.5	0	2.5
U4	Sergey Fedorchuk	2634	X	X	X	X	X	0.5	1	0.5	1	1	4
U5	Yaroslav Zherebukh	2632	X	X	X	X	X	1	0.5	0.5	0	0	2
P1	Mateusz Bartel	2677	1	0	0	0.5	0	X	X	X	X	X	1.5
P2	Bartosz Soćko	2635	0.5	0	0.5	0	0.5	X	X	X	X	X	1.5
P3	Kamil Mitoń	2622	0.5	0	0.5	0.5	0.5	X	X	X	X	X	2
P4	Bartłomiej Macieja	2614	0	1	0.5	0	1	X	X	X	X	X	2.5
P5	Dariusz Świercz	2585	0	1	1	0	1	X	X	X	X	X	3

Rapid time control: Ukraine 13.5 - Poland 11.5

No.	Player	Rating	U1	U2	U3	U4	U5	P1	P2	P3	P4	P5	Total
U1	Zahar Efimenko	2689	X	X	X	X	X	0.5	1	0	0.5	0.5	2.5
U2	Anton Korobov	2678	X	X	X	X	X	1	0.5	1	0.5	1	4
U3	Yuriy Kryvoruchko	2676	X	X	X	X	X	05	1	0.5	0	0.5	2.5
U4	Sergey Fedorchuk	2634	X	X	X	X	X	0.5	1	0	0.5	0	2
U5	Yaroslav Zherebukh	2632	X	X	X	X	X	05	0	1	1	0	2.5
P1	Mateusz Bartel	2677	0.5	0	0.5	0.5	0.5	X	X	X	X	X	2
P2	Bartosz Soćko	2635	0	0.5	0	0	1	X	X	X	X	X	1.5
P3	Kamil Mitoń	2622	1	0	0.5	1	0	X	X	X	X	X	2.5
P4	Bartłomiej Macieja	2614	0.5	0.5	1	0.5	0	X	X	X	X	X	2.5
P5	Dariusz Świercz	2585	0.5	0	0.5	1	1	X	X	X	X	X	3

Blitz match: Ukraine 5.5 - Poland 4.5

Ukraine	Score	Poland
Zahar Efimenko	0.5 - 1.5	Mateusz Bartel
Anton Korobov	1.5 - 0.5	Bartosz Socko
Yuriy Kryvoruchko	1.5 - 0.5	Kamil Miton
Sergey Fedorchuk	1.5 - 0.5	Bartlomiej Macieja
Yaroslav Zherebukh	0.5 - 1.5	Dariusz Swiercz

== Lublin Union Memorial 2013 ==
The fifth edition returned to a ten-player round robin format and was held on 15–23 June 2013 at the Crown Tribunal. Draws before 40 moves were banned.

	Player	Country	Rating	1	2	3	4	5	6	7	8	9	10	Points
1	Kirill Stupak	Belarus	2510	XX	0.5	0.5	1	1	0	1	0	1	1	6
2	Kamil Dragun	Poland	2523	0.5	XX	0	0.5	0.5	1	1	1	1	0.5	6
3	Daniel Semcesen	Sweden	2431	0.5	1	XX	0.5	0.5	0.5	0	1	0.5	1	5,5
4	Kacper Drozdowski	Poland	2441	0	0.5	0.5	XX	0.5	0.5	0.5	1	1	1	5.5
5	Daniel Sadzikowski	Poland	2448	0	0.5	0.5	0.5	XX	1	1	0	1	0.5	5
6	Jan-Krzysztof Duda	Poland	2539	1	0	0.5	0.5	0	XX	1	0.5	0.5	1	5
7	Oleg Romanishin	Ukraine	2503	0	0	1	0.5	0	0	XX	1	0.5	1	4
8	Jolanta Zawadzka	Poland	2391	1	0	0	0	1	0.5	0	XX	0.5	0.5	3.5
9	Oleksandr Sulypa	Ukraine	2508	0	0	0.5	0	0	0.5	0.5	0.5	XX	0.5	2.5
10	Monika Soćko	Poland	2458	0	0.5	0	0	0.5	0	0	0.5	0.5	XX	2

== Lublin Union Memorial 2014 ==
The format was similar to the 2012 format with four players per team with one round classical and one round rapid (no blitz match) on 6–11 May 2014. Again Ukraine and Poland competed, Ukraine dominating the classical round 12.5-3.5 but Poland convincingly won the rapid 10-6.

Classical match: Ukraine 12.5 - Poland 3.5

No.	Player	Rating	U1	U2	U3	U4	P1	P2	P3	P4	Total
U1	Alexander Moiseenko	2707	X	X	X	X	1	1	1	0.5	3.5
U2	Alexander Areshchenko	2701	X	X	X	X	1	0.5	1	1	3.5
U3	Zahar Efimenko	2648	X	X	X	X	0	1	0.5	0.5	2
U4	Mikhailo Oleksienko	2618	X	X	X	X	1	1	1	0.5	3.5
P1	Radoslaw Wojtaszek	2724	0	0	1	0	X	X	X	X	1
P2	Grzegorz Gajewski	2641	0	0.5	0	0	X	X	X	X	0.5
P3	Dariusz Swiercz	2608	0	0	0.5	0	X	X	X	X	0.5
P4	Jan-Krzysztof Duda	2587	0.5	0	0.5	0.5	X	X	X	X	1.5

Rapid match: Ukraine 6 - 10 Poland

No.	Player	Rating	U1	U2	U3	U4	P1	P2	P3	P4	Total
U1	Alexander Moiseenko	2699	X	X	X	X	0.5	0	0	0.5	1
U2	Alexander Areshchenko	2684	X	X	X	X	0.5	0	0	0	0.5
U3	Zahar Efimenko	2677	X	X	X	X	0.5	1	0.5	0.5	2.5
U4	Mikhailo Oleksienko	2578	X	X	X	X	0.5	1	0	0.5	2
P1	Radoslaw Wojtaszek	2710	0.5	0.5	0.5	0.5	X	X	X	X	2
P2	Grzegorz Gajewski	2633	1	1	0	0	X	X	X	X	2
P3	Dariusz Swiercz	2609	1	1	0.5	1	X	X	X	X	3.5
P4	Jan-Krzysztof Duda	2467	0.5	1	0.5	0.5	X	X	X	X	2.5

== Lublin Union Memorial 2015 ==
Similar to the previous edition it was held as a match format with Lublin facing Lviv, Ukraine. A two-round classical match was followed by a seven-round rapid contest between all twelve players and the addition of Polish player Marcin Maka. A round-robin blitz event completed the programme but with Ukrainian Roman Korman substituting Maka.

Lublin convincingly won the Classical match, Marcin Dziuba won the rapid and Pawel Stoma won the blitz.

Classical match

C1	Lviv	Rtg	Res.	Lublin	Rtg
1	Andriy Shankovsky	2302	1-0	Marcin Dziuba	2564
2	Vsevolod Rytenko	2243	0-1	Pawel Stoma	2359
3	Taras Panchyshyn	2143	0-1	Zbigniew Księski	2348
4	Roman Davymuka	2140	1-0	Piotr Polkowski	2129
5	Julia Savchuk	1864	0-1	Agata Topolan	1746
6	Andriy Prydun	1678	0-1	Weronika Frazcek	1711

C2	Lublin	Rtg	Res.	Lviv	Rtg
1	Marcin Dziuba	2564	1-0	Andriy Shankovsky	2302
2	Pawel Stoma	2359	0-1	Vsevolod Rytenko	2243
3	Zbigniew Księski	2348	0.5-0.5	Taras Panchyshyn	2143
4	Piotr Polkowski	2129	1-0	Roman Davymuka	2140
5	Agata Topolan	1746	1-0	Julia Savchuk	1864
6	Weronika Frazcek	1711	1-0	Andriy Prydun	1678

Rapid tournament: 7 rounds

	Player	Country	Rating	Score
1	Marcin Dziuba	POL	2570	6.5
2	Andriy Shankovsky	UKR	2302	5
3	Vsevolod Rytenko	UKR	2217	4.5
4	Zbigniew Księski	POL	2328	4
5	Taras Panchyshyn	UKR	2134	4
6	Pawel Stoma	POL	2363	4
7	Marcin Maka	POL	2098	4
8	Roman Davymuka	UKR	2080	4
9	Piotr Polkowski	POL	2297	3.5
10	Andriy Prydun	UKR	1706	3
11	Julia Savchuk	UKR	1837	3
12	Agata Topolan	POL	1707	2
13	Weronika Fraczek	POL	1676	1.5

Blitz section

B	Player	Country	Rating	Score
1	Pawel Stoma	POL	2363	11.5
2	Marcin Dziuba	POL	2557	11
3	Taras Panchyshyn	UKR	2124	8
4	Roman Davymuka	UKR	2100	8
5	Piotr Polkowski	POL	2239	7
6	Zbigniew Księski	POL	2328	7
7	Agata Topolan	POL	1804	6.5
8	Vsevolod Rytenko	UKR	2217	6.5
9	Olexandr Prohorov	UKR	2127	4
10	Weronika Fraczek	POL	1639	3
11	Andriy Prydun	UKR	1825	2.5
12	Julia Savchuk	UKR	1888	2
13	Roman Korman	UKR	1952	1

== Lublin Union Memorial 2016 ==
The format was adjusted from previous editions, being held as a six-player Scheveningen match between Poland and a Europe team under classical time control. The Europe team won the six round event 7-5 in match points.

No	Player	Fed.	Rating	E1	E2	E3	P1	P2	P3	Total
E1	David Navara	(Czech Republic) Czech Rep.	2744	X	X	X	1.5	1.5	2	5
E2	Martyn Kravtsiv	Ukraine	2634	X	X	X	1	0.5	1.5	3
E3	Dimitrios Mastrovasilis	Greece	2606	X	X	X	0	1	0.5	1.5
P1	Kacper Piorun	Poland	2676	0.5	1	2	X	X	X	3.5
P2	Mateusz Bartel	Poland	2640	0.5	1.5	1	X	X	X	3
P3	Jacek Tomczak	Poland	2588	0	0.5	1.5	X	X	X	2
