= World Rapid Chess Championship 2021 =

FIDE tournament in Nur-Sultan, Kazakhstan

	World Rapid Champion	Women's World Rapid Champion
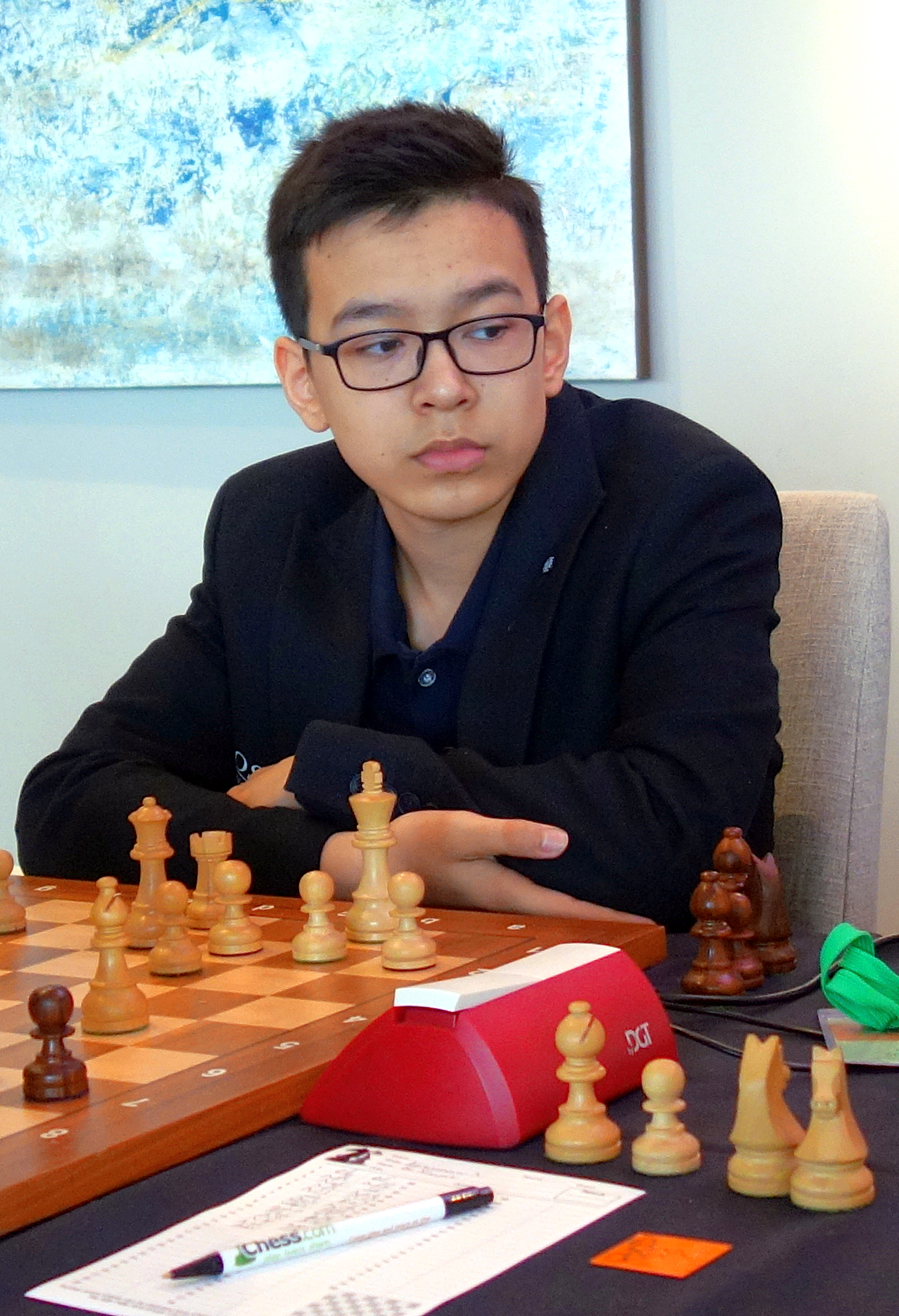
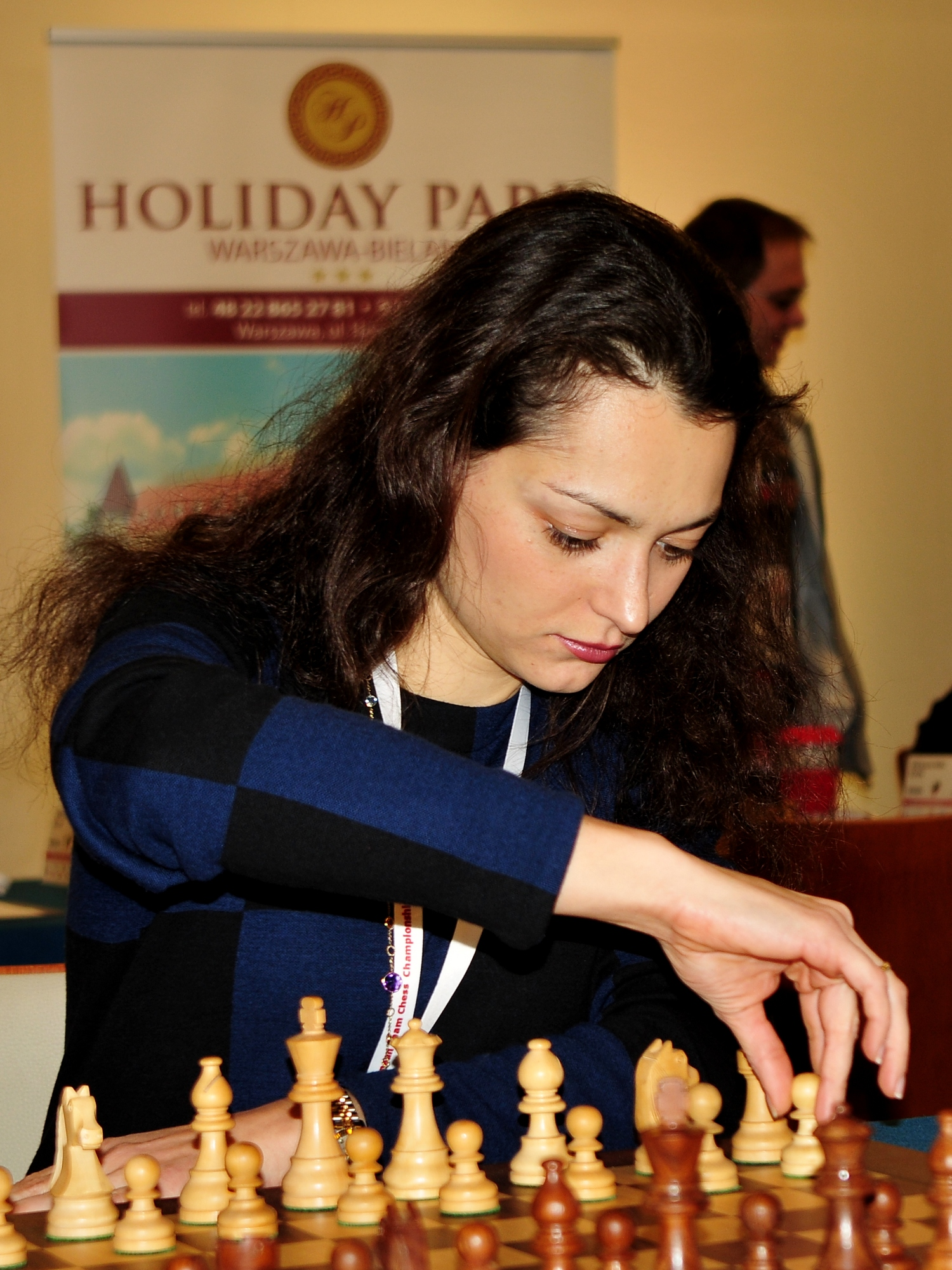
	(Uzbekistan) Nodirbek Abdusattorov	(Note: Kosteniuk is Russian, but competed under the Chess Federation of Russia flag, due to WADA sanctions against Russia.) Alexandra Kosteniuk
9½/13	Scores	9/11
	Born 18 September 2004; 17 years old	Born 23 April 1984; 37 years old
	Rating: 2593 (World No. 132)	Rating: 2515 (World No. 6)

The World Rapid Chess Championship 2021 was the 2021 edition of the annual World Rapid Chess Championship held by FIDE to determine the world champion in chess played under rapid time controls. Since 2012, FIDE has held the World Rapid and Blitz Championships at a joint tournament. Originally planned to be held in Nur-Sultan, Kazakhstan, new coronavirus restrictions introduced by the Kazakh government prompted FIDE to change the location of the tournament to Warsaw, Poland.

The event took place at the Stadion Narodowy in Warsaw between 26 and 28 December 2021, using a Swiss-system with 13 rounds for the open tournament and 11 rounds for the women's tournament. Players who were eligible to participate in the open tournament must have either been rated at least 2550 Elo in a FIDE rating list during 2021, or were a reigning national champion. The time control for the tournament was 15+10, meaning each player initially started with 15 minutes and gained 10 seconds increment with each move.

== Participants ==
176 players took part in the open tournament, and 103 in the women's tournament.

Federation	Open	Women's	Total
Algeria	1	0	1
Argentina	1	1	2
Armenia	9	2	11
Austria	2	0	2
Azerbaijan	7	5	12
Bosnia and Herzegovina	1	0	1
Brazil	1	2	3
Bulgaria	1	2	3
Russia (Note: All Russian players competed under the Chess Federation of Russia flag, due to WADA sanctions against Russia.)	25	18	42
Croatia	1	0	1
Czech Republic	3	1	4
Denmark	1	0	1
Ecuador	0	1	1
Egypt	3	0	3
England	1	0	1
Spain	7	1	8
(FIDE) none	1	0	1
France	2	1	3
(Georgia (country)) Georgia	3	3	6
Germany	5	2	7
Greece	3	1	4
Hungary	4	0	4
India	11	5	16
Iran	2	1	3
Israel	4	2	6
Italy	2	0	2
Kazakhstan	1	5	6
Kyrgyzstan	1	1	2
Kosovo	1	0	1
Luxembourg	0	1	1
Mongolia	0	1	1
Netherlands	3	1	4
Norway	4	1	5
Poland (host)	27	22	49
Qatar	1	0	1
Romania	3	2	5
Slovenia	0	1	1
Serbia	2	1	3
Slovakia	1	0	1
Sweden	1	0	1
Tajikistan	1	0	1
Turkey	1	1	2
United Arab Emirates	1	0	1
Ukraine	8	11	19
United States	7	1	8
Uzbekistan	4	0	4
Venezuela	1	0	1
Wales	1	0	1
Yemen	1	0	1

== Prize fund ==
The prize fund for both the open and women's tournament is shown below. In case of a tie (except for first place) all prize money was shared between the players. Players outside the brackets did not receive any prize money. All amounts are in United States dollars.

Open tournament:

- 1st place: $60,000
- 2nd place: $50,000
- 3rd place: $40,000
- 4th place: $30,000
- 5th place: $25,000
- 6th place: $22,000
- 7th place: $18,000
- 8th place: $14,000
- 9th place: $11,000
- 10th place: $8,000
- 11th–16th places: $5,000
- 17th–25th places: $3,000
- 26th–35th places: $1,500

Total: $350,000

Women's tournament:

- 1st place: $40,000
- 2nd place: $30,000
- 3rd place: $20,000
- 4th place: $15,000
- 5th place: $10,000
- 6th place: $7,000
- 7th place: $6,000
- 8th place: $5,000
- 9th place: $4,000
- 10th place: $3,000
- 11th–15th places: $2,000

Total: $150,000

== Schedule ==
The opening ceremony took place on Saturday 25 December. Start times are approximate as all matches in the previous round had to finish before the next round could commence. All times are CET.

Open round	Women's round	Date	Time
1	1	Sunday 26 December	15:00
2	2	Sunday 26 December	16:15
3	3	Sunday 26 December	17:30
4	4	Sunday 26 December	18:45
5		Sunday 26 December	20:00
6	5	Monday 27 December	15:00
7	6	Monday 27 December	16:15
8	7	Monday 27 December	17:30
9	8	Monday 27 December	18:45
10	9	Tuesday 28 December	15:00
11	10	Tuesday 28 December	16:15
12	11	Tuesday 28 December	17:30
13		Tuesday 28 December	18:45

== Tiebreak regulations ==
For players who finished on the same score, final position was determined by the following tie-breaks, in order:

1. Buchholz Cut 1 (the sum of the scores of each of the opponents of a player but reduced by the lowest score of the opponents)
2. Buchholz (the sum of the scores of each of the opponents of a player)
3. Average Rating of Opponents Cut 1 (average rating of opponents excluding the lowest rated opponent)
4. The results of individual games between tied players
5. Drawing of lots

If two or more players were tied for any position other than first, the above mentioned tiebreak system decided the ranking of the tied players.

If two or more players were tied for first, the top two players who finished the highest on the above mentioned tiebreaks would play a two game mini match with the time control of 3+2 (with colours of the first game drawn) to decide the winner. If the score was tied 1-1, the players would continue to play single 3+2 games until one of the players won one game (the player who finished highest on the above mentioned tiebreaks would have the white pieces for the first game and the colours would alternate from the next game).

== Open tournament results ==
The following table lists all participants, with the results from the 13 rounds. They are ranked according to the results, taking into account the tie-breaks.

Notation: "1 (W 116)" indicates a win (1 point) with white pieces (W) against player of rank 116 (Victor Mikhalevski)

Rank	Name	Rating	1	2	3	4	5	6	7	8	9	10	11	12	13	Total	BC1	BS	AROC1
1	(Uzbekistan) Nodirbek Abdusattorov	2593	1 (W 116)	1 (B 61)	1 (W 4)	½ (B 2)	½ (W 13)	0 (W 24)	1 (B 6)	1 (W 50)	1 (B 22)	1 (W 3)	½ (B 14)	½ (B 9)	½ (W 5)	9½	103	109	2674
2	Ian Nepomniachtchi	2798	1 (B 48)	1 (W 68)	1 (B 45)	½ (W 1)	½ (B 24)	1 (W 5)	½ (B 40)	½ (W 22)	1 (B 59)	1 (W 13)	½ (B 3)	½ (W 7)	½ (B 4)	9½	100½	107½	2699
3	(Norway) Magnus Carlsen	2842	1 (W 120)	½ (B 87)	1 (W 80)	1 (W 60)	1 (B 62)	½ (B 40)	1 (W 20)	½ (B 13)	1 (W 5)	0 (B 1)	½ (W 2)	1 (W 6)	½ (B 7)	9½	97	103	2691
4	(United States) Fabiano Caruana	2770	1 (B 148)	1 (W 66)	0 (B 1)	1 (W 90)	½ (B 59)	1 (W 45)	½ (B 21)	½ (W 23)	1 (W 39)	1 (B 51)	½ (W 5)	1 (B 13)	½ (W 2)	9½	95	100	2649
5	(Poland) Jan-Krzysztof Duda	2801	1 (W 141)	1 (B 71)	1 (W 21)	1 (B 44)	½ (W 40)	0 (B 2)	1 (W 42)	1 (W 76)	0 (B 3)	½ (W 23)	½ (B 4)	1 (W 18)	½ (B 1)	9	98	103	2679
6	(United States) Levon Aronian	2728	½ (B 43)	1 (W 164)	1 (B 46)	½ (W 20)	0 (B 23)	1 (W 77)	0 (W 1)	1 (B 73)	1 (W 28)	1 (B 12)	1 (W 15)	0 (B 3)	1 (W 30)	9	96	100	2544
7	(United States) Hikaru Nakamura	2836	1 (B 69)	½ (W 12)	½ (B 90)	1 (W 43)	½ (B 21)	1 (W 67)	½ (W 39)	½ (B 44)	1 (W 14)	½ (B 20)	1 (W 42)	½ (B 2)	½ (W 3)	9	95½	102	2650
8	(Azerbaijan) Shakhriyar Mamedyarov	2727	1 (W 53)	½ (B 47)	1 (W 87)	0 (B 22)	1 (W 106)	0 (B 42)	1 (W 60)	0 (B 37)	1 (W 58)	1 (B 34)	½ (W 12)	1 (W 23)	1 (B 26)	9	92	98	2588
9	(India) Gukesh D	2050	1 (W 172)	0 (B 59)	1 (W 52)	0 (B 39)	1 (W 73)	½ (B 81)	½ (B 31)	1 (W 66)	1 (B 27)	1 (W 22)	1 (B 40)	½ (W 1)	½ (W 13)	9	91	95	2619
10	(Hungary) Richárd Rapport	2750	1 (B 91)	1 (W 113)	0 (B 59)	½ (W 12)	1 (W 84)	½ (B 30)	1 (W 80)	½ (B 39)	0 (W 51)	½ (W 21)	1 (B 67)	1 (B 42)	1 (W 32)	9	88	94	2592
11	Sergey Karjakin	2757	½ (W 109)	0 (B 126)	½ (W 152)	0 (B 129)	1 (W 140)	1 (B 164)	1 (W 141)	1 (B 52)	½ (W 15)	1 (B 39)	1 (W 51)	½ (B 14)	1 (W 20)	9	78½	82½	2519
12	(Netherlands) Jorden van Foreest	2563	1 (W 171)	½ (B 7)	½ (W 16)	½ (B 10)	1 (W 31)	1 (W 62)	½ (B 25)	½ (W 20)	1 (B 76)	0 (W 6)	½ (B 8)	½ (B 19)	1 (W 44)	8½	98	103½	2715
13	Alexander Grischuk	2763	1 (B 144)	1 (W 74)	1 (B 111)	½ (W 59)	½ (B 1)	1 (W 23)	1 (B 24)	½ (W 3)	½ (B 40)	0 (B 2)	1 (W 44)	0 (W 4)	½ (B 9)	8½	97½	102½	2655
14	Vladimir Fedoseev	2692	½ (W 152)	½ (B 65)	1 (W 69)	1 (B 66)	1 (W 128)	1 (B 27)	½ (W 22)	½ (W 40)	0 (B 7)	1 (B 37)	½ (W 1)	½ (W 11)	½ (B 17)	8½	94	98½	2639
15	(India) Guha Mitrabha	2107	0 (B 46)	1 (W 122)	0 (B 74)	1 (W 63)	½ (B 85)	1 (B 57)	1 (W 128)	1 (W 67)	½ (B 11)	1 (W 26)	0 (B 6)	1 (W 40)	½ (B 16)	8½	90	95½	2622
16	Daniil Dubov	2735	1 (B 86)	½ (W 46)	½ (B 12)	1 (W 68)	0 (W 39)	1 (B 124)	½ (W 28)	1 (B 41)	0 (W 42)	1 (B 79)	1 (W 56)	½ (B 20)	½ (W 15)	8½	90	95½	2561
17	(France) Maxime Vachier-Lagrave	2773	½ (W 118)	½ (B 73)	1 (B 89)	1 (W 111)	½ (B 45)	0 (W 21)	½ (B 66)	1 (W 104)	½ (B 56)	½ (W 67)	1 (B 55)	1 (W 27)	½ (W 14)	8½	86	92	2562
18	(United Arab Emirates) Salem A. R. Saleh	2729	0 (W 124)	1 (B 94)	1 (W 57)	0 (B 128)	½ (W 61)	1 (B 119)	1 (W 131)	½ (B 28)	½ (W 34)	1 (W 47)	1 (B 41)	0 (B 5)	1 (W 39)	8½	85	90½	2556
19	Alexey Sarana	2680	½ (B 140)	1 (W 134)	1 (B 150)	½ (W 23)	0 (B 27)	1 (W 74)	0 (B 41)	½ (W 85)	½ (B 46)	1 (W 82)	1 (B 59)	½ (W 12)	1 (B 43)	8½	84	89	2537
20	(France) Alireza Firouzja	2656	½ (W 105)	1 (B 33)	1 (W 145)	½ (B 6)	1 (W 65)	1 (W 59)	0 (B 3)	½ (B 12)	1 (W 32)	½ (W 7)	½ (B 23)	½ (W 16)	0 (B 11)	8	97½	102½	2626
21	(Ukraine) Andrei Volokitin	2631	1 (B 136)	1 (W 132)	0 (B 5)	1 (W 125)	½ (W 7)	1 (B 17)	½ (W 4)	½ (B 25)	½ (W 44)	½ (B 10)	½ (W 32)	½ (B 24)	½ (b 29)	8	95½	101	2642
22	(Israel) Boris Gelfand	2648	1 (W 159)	1 (B 124)	½ (W 110)	1 (W 8)	½ (B 25)	1 (W 41)	½ (B 14)	½ (B 2)	0 (W 1)	0 (B 9)	½ (W 83)	½ (B 33)	1 (W 65)	8	94	98½	2525
23	(Bulgaria) Ivan Cheparinov	2621	1 (W 155)	½ (B 145)	1 (W 154)	½ (B 19)	1 (W 6)	0 (B 13)	1 (W 84)	½ (B 4)	1 (W 25)	½ (B 5)	½ (W 20)	0 (B 8)	½ (W 24)	8	93½	98	2640
24	(Ukraine) Anton Korobov	2689	½ (W 64)	1 (B 55)	1 (W 98)	1 (B 110)	½ (W 2)	1 (B 1)	0 (W 13)	0 (W 59)	½ (B 47)	½ (W 63)	1 (B 78)	½ (W 21)	½ (B 23)	8	92½	98½	2579
25	(Netherlands) Anish Giri	2767	½ (W 73)	1 (B 118)	1 (W 75)	1 (B 35)	½ (W 22)	½ (B 39)	½ (W 12)	½ (W 21)	0 (B 23)	½ (B 30)	1 (W 37)	½ (B 44)	½ (B 28)	8	92	98	2618
26	(Ukraine) Volodymyr Onyshchuk	2687	1 (B 122)	1 (W 57)	0 (B 60)	½ (W 74)	1 (W 113)	½ (B 47)	½ (W 32)	1 (B 106)	½ (W 37)	0 (B 15)	1 (W 52)	1 (B 41)	0 (W 8)	8	89	95	2535
27	(Armenia) Tigran L. Petrosian	2621	1 (W 130)	0 (B 110)	1 (W 53)	1 (B 143)	1 (W 19)	0 (W 14)	0 (B 50)	1 (B 129)	0 (W 9)	1 (B 48)	1 (W 31)	0 (B 17)	1 (W 64)	8	89	94	2559
28	(Ukraine) Zahar Efimenko	2609	½ (W 33)	½ (B 105)	½ (W 64)	1 (B 145)	1 (W 147)	½ (W 50)	½ (B 16)	½ (W 18)	0 (B 6)	½ (B 61)	1 (W 70)	1 (B 83)	½ (W 25)	8	88	93	2524
29	(Armenia) Shant Sargsyan	2344	1 (W 34)	0 (B 45)	0 (W 81)	1 (B 148)	1 (W 52)	½ (B 37)	½ (W 79	1 (B 107)	0 (W 75)	1 (B 68)	½ (W 35)	1 (B 51)	½ (W 21)	8	87	92	2599
30	Maxim Matlakov	2652	½ (B 108)	1 (W 82)	½ (B 41)	½ (W 112)	1 (B 126)	½ (W 10)	0 (B 59)	1 (W 74)	½ (B 60)	½ (W 25)	1 (B 63)	1 (W 62)	0 (B 6)	8	86½	92	2572
31	(Armenia) Gabriel Sargissian	2693	½ (B 134)	1 (W 63)	0 (B 43)	1 (W 144)	0 (B 12)	½ (B 48)	½ (W 9)	½ (B 109)	1 (W 73)	1 (W 85)	0 (B 27)	1 (W 66)	1 (B 68)	8	86	91	2540
32	(Ukraine) Kirill Shevchenko	2508	0 (B 36)	½ (W 166)	1 (B 169)	1 (B 102)	½ (W 75)	1 (W 88)	½ (B 26)	1 (W 54)	0 (B 20)	1 (W 76)	½ (B 21)	1 (W 49)	0 (B 10)	8	85½	88½	2641
33	(Armenia) Haik M. Martirosyan	2377	½ (B 28)	0 (W 20)	1 (B 91)	½ (W 87)	1 (B 90)	½ (B 51)	½ (W 75)	0 (W 56)	½ (B 100)	1 (B 113)	1 (B 115)	½ (W 22)	1 (B 59)	8	84½	90½	2600
34	(Germany) Matthias Blübaum	2575	0 (B 29)	1 (W 135)	½ (B 93)	1 (W 149)	0 (B 78)	½ (W 127)	1 (B 134)	1 (W 89)	½ (B 18)	0 (W 8)	1 (B 50)	½ (W 36)	1 (B 62)	8	84	89	2539
35	(Germany) Rasmus Svane	2677	½ (B 114)	1 (W 140)	1 (B 108)	0 (W 25)	½ (B 74)	½ (W 46)	½ (B 85)	1 (W 113)	½ (B 63)	½ (W 78)	½ (B 29)	½ (W 43)	1 (B 69)	8	82½	87½	2518
36	Vladislav Artemiev	2714	1 (W 32)	½ (B 107)	0 (W 47)	½ (B 73)	0 (W 124)	½ (B 53)	1 (W 152)	½ (B 48)	1 (W 109)	½ (B 60)	1 (W 131)	½ (B 34)	1 (W 71)	8	81½	86	2535
37	Maksim Chigaev	2605	0 (B 147)	1 (W 156)	0 (B 112)	1 (W 163)	1 (B 162)	½ (W 29)	1 (B 77)	1 (W 8)	½ (B 26)	0 (W 14)	0 (B 25)	1 (W 86)	1 (B 60)	8	80½	84	2522
38	(England) David Howell	2624	½ (B 157)	0 (W 108)	1 (B 121)	½ (W 114)	½ (B 127)	1 (W 126)	½ (B 64)	½ (W 46)	0 (B 43)	1 (W 77)	½ (B 66)	1 (W 100)	1 (B 63)	8	78	82½	2491
39	(Spain) David Antón Guijarro	2627	1 (W 176)	½ (W 41)	½ (B 77)	1 (W 9)	1 (B 16)	½ (W 25)	½ (B 7)	½ (W 10)	0 (B 4)	0 (W 11)	1 (B 47)	1 (W 55)	0 (B 18)	7½	99½	105½	2589
40	(Georgia (country)) Baadur Jobava	2679	1 (W 94)	1 (B 52)	1 (W 142)	1 (B 84)	½ (B 5)	½ (W 3)	½ (W 2)	½ (B 14)	½ (W 13)	½ (B 42)	0 (W 9)	0 (B 15)	½ (W 57)	7½	98	103	2573
41	(United States) Hans Moke Niemann	2327	1 (W 81)	½ (B 39)	½ (W 30)	1 (B 51)	1 (W 44)	0 (B 22)	1 (W 19)	0 (W 16)	1 (B 49)	1 (B 75)	0 (W 18)	0 (W 26)	½ (B 56)	7½	93	99½	2660
42	(Armenia) Robert Hovhannisyan	2613	½ (B 125)	1 (W 151)	½ (B 50)	½ (W 77)	1 (B 112)	1 (W 8)	0 (B 5)	1 (W 43)	1 (B 16)	½ (W 40)	0 (B 7)	0 (W 10)	½ (B 46)	7½	92½	97½	2625
43	(Iran) Parham Maghsoodloo	2512	½ (W 6)	1 (B 117)	1 (W 31)	0 (B 7)	1 (W 97)	1 (W 49)	0 (B 76)	0 (B 42)	1 (W 38)	½ (W 62)	1 (B 88)	½ (B 35)	0 (W 19)	7½	92	98	2693
44	Kirill Alekseenko	2637	1 (B 162)	1 (W 112)	1 (B 147)	0 (W 5)	0 (B 41)	1 (W 86)	1 (B 68)	½ (W 7)	½ (B 21)	1 (W 59)	0 (B 13)	½ (W 25)	0 (B 12)	7½	90	93½	2601
45	(India) Vidit Gujrathi	2629	1 (B 135)	1 (W 29)	0 (W 2)	1 (B 142)	½ (W 17)	0 (B 4)	½ (W 61)	0 (B 64)	½ (W 65)	½ (B 53)	½ (W 48)	1 (B 119)	1 (W 91)	7½	89½	94½	2551
46	(Germany) Daniel Fridman	2542	1 (W 15)	½ (B 16)	0 (W 6)	½ (B 153)	1 (W 171)	½ (B 35)	½ (W 97)	½ (B 38)	½ (W 19)	½ (B 92)	½ (W 79)	1 (B 75)	½ (W 42)	7½	89½	94	2585
47	Evgeniy Najer	2565	1 (B 138)	½ (W 8)	1 (B 36)	0 (W 62)	1 (B 104)	½ (W 26)	½ (B 54)	½ (W 49)	½ (W 24)	0 (B 18)	0 (W 39)	1 (B 127)	1 (W 83)	7½	88½	94	2600
48	(Greece) Dimitrios Mastrovasilis	2534	0 (W 2)	1 (B 171)	½ (B 49)	1 (W 173)	0 (B 54)	½ (W 31)	½ (B 88)	½ (W 36)	1 (B 89)	0 (W 27)	½ (B 45)	1 (W 115)	1 (W 80)	7½	87	88½	2607
49	(Croatia) Ivan Šarić	2684	½ (W 55)	½ (B 64)	½ (W 48)	1 (B 109)	1 (W 98)	0 (B 43)	1 (W 118)	½ (B 47)	0 (W 41)	1 (B 74)	1 (W 60)	0 (B 32)	½ (W 52)	7½	86	92	2521
50	(Poland) Radosław Wojtaszek	2743	½ (W 126)	1 (B 109)	½ (W 42)	½ (B 81)	1 (W 107)	½ (B 28)	1 (W 27)	0 (B 1)	½ (W 79)	0 (B 56)	0 (W 34)	1 (B 131)	1 (W 61)	7½	86	91½	2578
51	(Egypt) Bassem Amin	2614	0 (B 112)	1 (W 162)	1 (B 132)	0 (W 41)	1 (B 125)	½ (W 33)	1 (B 78)	1 (W 146)	1 (B 10)	0 (W 4)	0 (B 11)	0 (W 29)	1 (B 74	7½	86	89½	2506
52	(Iran) Ehsan Ghaem Maghami	2553	1 (B 166)	0 (W 40)	0 (B 9)	1 (W 135)	0 (B 29)	1 (W 82)	1 (B 127)	0 (W 11)	1 (B 108)	1 (W 104)	0 (B 26)	1 (W 88)	½ (B 49)	7½	85	88½	2505
53	(Poland) Paweł Czarnota	2511	0 (B 8)	1 (W 123)	0 (B 27)	0 (W 83)	1 (B 170)	½ (W 36)	½ (B 96)	1 (W 133)	½ (B 95)	½ (W 45)	1 (B 107)	1 (W 67)	(B 54)	7½	84	86½	2561
54	David Paravyan	2671	½ (W 129)	1 (B 127)	½ (W 126)	½ (B 113)	1 (W 48)	½ (B 60)	½ (W 47)	0 (B 32)	1 (W 106)	0 (B 55)	1 (W 58)	½ (B 65)	½ (W 53)	7½	82½	88	2515
55	(India) Abhimanyu Puranik	2472	½ (B 49)	0 (W 24)	½ (W 99)	½ (B 117)	1 (W 102)	0 (B 79)	1 (W 167)	1 (B 128)	1 (B 146)	1 (W 54)	0 (W 17)	0 (B 39)	1 (W 81)	7½	81	85	2655
56	Pavel Ponkratov	2614	0 (W 110)	1 (B 165)	0 (W 65)	0 (B 105)	1 (W 158)	1 (B 142)	1 (W 124)	1 (B 33)	½ (W 17)	1 (W 50)	0 (B 16)	½ (B 64)	½ (W 41)	7½	81	85	2512
57	(Norway) Aryan Tari	2542	1 (W 173)	0 (B 26)	0 (B 18)	1 (W 160)	½ (B 83)	0 (W 15)	1 (B 112)	½ (W 77)	½ (B 125)	½ (W 96)	1 (B 130)	1 (W 72)	½ (B 40)	7½	80	81½	2461
58	(Poland) Kacper Piorun	2547	0 (W 61)	1 (B 160)	½ (W 104)	0 (B 154)	½ (W 130)	1 (B 171)	½ (W 143)	1 (B 93)	0 (B 8)	1 (W 125)	0 (B 54)	1 (W 78)	1 (W 101)	7½	75	79½	2429
59	(United States) Timur Gareyev	2578	1 (B 139)	1 (W 9)	1 (W 10)	½ (B 13)	½ (W 4)	0 (B 20)	1 (W 30)	1 (B 24)	0 (W 2)	0 (B 44)	0 (W 19)	1 (B 84)	0 (W 33)	7	100	105½	2617
60	(India) Harsha Bharathakoti	2484	1 (W 101)	1 (B 96)	1 (W 26)	0 (B 3)	½ (W 76)	½ (W 54)	0 (B 8)	1 (B 80)	½ (W 30)	½ (W 36)	0 (B 49)	1 (B 92)	0 (W 37)	7	91½	97½	2684
61	Gleb Dudin	2247	1 (B 58)	0 (W 1)	1 (B 85)	½ (W 146)	½ (B 18)	½ (W 66)	½ (B 45)	½ (W 68)	½ (B 115)	½ (W 28)	½ (B 95)	1 (W 90)	0 (B 50)	7	88	93	2617
62	(Spain) Alexei Shirov	2702	½ (W 65)	1 (B 152)	1 (W 107)	1 (B 47)	0 (W 3)	0 (B 12)	0 (W 106)	1 (B 118)	1 (W 64)	½ (B 43)	1 (W 75)	0 (B 30)	0 (W 34)	7	87½	92	2579
63	(Turkey) Vahap Şanal	2509	½ (W 117)	0 (B 31)	½ (W 70)	0 (B 15)	1 (W 161)	1 (B 99)	1 (W 92)	1 (B 97)	½ (W 35)	½ (B 24)	0 (W 30)	1 (B 79)	0 (W 38)	7	87½	91½	2596
64	(India) S. L. Narayanan	2482	½ (B 24)	½ (W 49)	½ (B 28)	1 (W 95)	½ (B 88)	½ (B 75)	½ (W 38)	1 (W 45)	0 (B 62)	½ (W 115)	1 (B 111)	½ (W 56)	0 (B 27)	7	87	93	2642
65	(India) Nihal Sarin	2500	½ (B 62)	½ (W 14)	1 (B 56)	1 (W 72)	0 (B 20)	0 (B 80)	½ (W 111)	½ (W 88)	½ (B 45)	1 (W 146)	1 (B 76)	½ (W 54)	0 (B 22)	7	86½	91½	2651
66	(Greece) Nikolas Theodorou	2559	1 (W 170)	0 (B 4)	1 (W 163)	0 (W 14)	1 (B 132)	½ (B 61)	½ (W 17)	0 (B 9)	½ (W 105)	1 (B 129)	½ (W 38)	0 (B 31)	1 (W 104)	7	85½	88	2498
67	Alexandr Predke	2630	1 (W 165)	0 (B 142)	1 (W 124)	½ (B 147)	1 (W 110)	0 (B 7)	1 (W 93)	0 (B 15)	1 (W 91)	½ (B 17)	0 (W 10)	0 (B 53)	1 (W 120)	7	83	87	2534
68	(Poland) Bartosz Soćko	2562	1 (W 161)	0 (B 2)	1 (W 105)	0 (B 16)	1 (W 153)	1 (B 154)	0 (W 44)	½ (B 61)	½ (B 104)	0 (W 29)	1 (B 144)	1 (W 82)	0 (W 31)	7	81	85	2472
69	(Germany) Alexander Donchenko	2535	0 (W 7)	1 (B 158)	0 (B 14)	0 (W 132)	1 (B 135)	0 (W 125)	1 (B 138)	1 (W 162)	0 (B 77)	1 (W 108)	1 (B 96)	1 (W 95)	0 (W 35)	7	77	80½	2514
70	(India) Sankalp Gupta	2266	½ (B 85)	0 (W 90)	½ (B 63)	0 (W 115)	0 (B 91)	1 (W 135)	1 (W 163)	1 (W 144)	½ (B 113)	1 (W 99)	0 (B 28)	½ (W 87)	1 (B 107)	7	76	80	2559
71	(Uzbekistan) Jahongir Vakhidov	2566	1 (W 133)	0 (W 5)	½ (B 133)	½ (B 93)	½ (W 143)	0 (B 105)	0 (W 116)	1 (B 165)	½ (W 110)	1 (B 145)	1 (W 124)	1 (W 104)	0 (B 36)	7	75	79	2439
72	Mikhail Antipov	2644	1 (W 149)	1 (B 163)	0 (W 84)	0 (B 65)	½ (W 105)	½ (B 129)	0 (W 73)	0 (B 94)	1 (W 93)	1 (B 152)	1 (W 141)	0 (B 57)	1 (W 106)	7	72½	76½	2475
73	(Argentina) Alan Pichot	2523	½ (B 25)	½ (W 17)	½ (B 95)	½ (W 36)	0 (B 9)	1 (W 138)	1 (B 72)	0 (W 6)	0 (B 31)	1 (W 133)	0 (B 90)	½ (W 99)	1 (B 125)	6½	88½	94	2604
74	Mikhail Demidov	2544	1 (W 153)	0 (B 13)	1 (W 15)	½ (B 26)	½ (W 35)	0 (B 19)	1 (W 130)	0 (B 30)	1 (W 143)	0 (W 49)	1 (B 77)	½ (B 80)	0 (W 51)	6½	88	92½	2554
75	(Spain) Jaime Santos Latasa	2618	½ (B 151)	1 (W 157)	0 (B 25)	1 (W 82)	½ (B 32)	½ (W 64)	½ (B 33)	1 (W 125)	1 (B 29)	0 (W 41)	0 (B 62)	0 (W 46)	½ (B 78)	6½	84½	89	2477
76	(Armenia) Sergei Movsesian	2667	1 (B 121)	½ (W 150)	½ (B 125)	1 (W 86)	½ (B 60)	1 (W 78)	1 (W 43)	0 (B 5)	0 (W 12)	0 (B 32)	0 (W 65)	½ (B 106)	½ (B 100)	6½	84	89	2527
77	(Poland) Jakub Kosakowski	2304	½ (W 128)	1 (B 167)	½ (W 39)	½ (B 42)	1 (W 92)	0 (B 6)	0 (W 37)	½ (B 57)	1 (W 69)	0 (B 38)	0 (W 74)	1 (B 141)	½ (W 79)	6½	84	88	2593
78	(Serbia) Velimir Ivić	2357	½ (W 79)	½ (B 128)	½ (W 92)	1 (B 131)	½ (W 34)	0 (B 76)	0 (W 51)	1 (B 81)	1 (W 97)	½ (B 35)	0 (W 24)	0 (B 58)	½ (W 75)	6½	83½	89	2612
79	Artyom Timofeev	2591	½ (B 78)	0 (W 125)	0 (B 82)	1 (W 137)	1 (B 108)	1 (W 55)	½ (B 29)	1 (W 84)	½ (B 50)	0 (W 16)	½ (B 46)	0 (W 63)	½ (B 77)	6½	83½	89	2474
80	Alexey Dreev	2621	1 (B 137)	½ (W 89)	0 (B 3)	½ (W 127)	1 (B 114)	1 (W 65)	0 (B 10)	0 (W 60)	½ (B 86)	1 (W 148)	½ (B 100)	½ (W 74)	0 (B 48)	6½	83	88	2548
81	(Spain) Alvar Alonso Rosell	2571	0 (B 41)	1 (W 155)	1 (B 29)	½ (W 50)	½ (B 89)	½ (W 9)	0 (B 104)	0 (W 78)	1 (B 136)	0 (W 86)	1 (B 94)	1 (W 118)	0 (B 55)	6½	83	87½	2420
82	(Poland) Szymon Gumularz	2452	½ (W 102)	0 (B 30)	1 (W 79)	0 (B 75)	½ (W 117)	0 (B 52)	1 (W 145)	1 (B 98)	1 (W 103)	0 (B 19)	1 (W 97)	0 (B 68)	½ (W 92)	6½	82½	87½	2614
83	(Azerbaijan) Khazar Babazada	2170	½ (W 98)	½ (B 99)	0 (W 128)	1 (B 53)	½ (W 57)	0 (B 106)	1 (W 102)	1 (B 131)	½ (B 85)	1 (W 107)	½ (B 22)	0 (W 28)	0 (B 47)	6½	82	87½	2587
84	(Azerbaijan) Mahammad Muradli	2285	1 (B 100)	1 (W 146)	1 (B 72)	0 (W 40)	0 (B 10)	1 (W 111)	0 (B 23)	0 (B 79)	1 (W 141)	0 (W 88)	1 (B 85)	0 (W 59)	½ (B 87)	6½	82	87	2616
85	(Romania) Mircea-Emilian Pârligras	2550	½ (W 70)	½ (B 143)	0 (W 61)	1 (B 161)	½ (W 15)	1 (B 110)	½ (W 35)	½ (B 19)	½ (W 83)	0 (B 31)	0 (W 84)	½ (B 124)	1 (W 130)	6½	82	86	2415
86	(Armenia) Manuel Petrosyan	2514	0 (W 16)	1 (B 168)	1 (W 96)	0 (B 76)	1 (W 99)	0 (B 44)	½ (W 101)	½ (B 111)	½ (W 80)	1 (B 81)	½ (W 92)	0 (B 37)	½ (W 97)	6½	81½	85	2641
87	(Armenia) Samvel Ter-Sahakyan	2573	1 (W 158)	½ (W 3)	0 (B 8)	½ (B 33)	0 (W 93)	½ (B 133)	½ (W 94)	½ (B 142)	½ (W 140)	½ (B 127)	1 (W 105)	½ (B 70)	½ (W 84)	6½	80½	85	2457
88	Anton Demchenko	2666	½ (W 127)	½ (B 129)	1 (W 148)	½ (B 126)	½ (W 64)	0 (B 32)	½ (W 48)	½ (B 65)	1 (W 124)	1 (B 84)	0 (W 43)	0 (B 52)	½ (W 103)	6½	79½	84½	2508
89	(Ukraine) Ihor Samunenkov	2259	1 (W 131)	½ (B 80)	0 (W 17)	1 (B 119)	½ (W 81)	½ (B 128)	½ (W 107)	0 (B 34)	0 (W 48)	1 (B 109)	½ (W 106)	0 (B 101)	1 (W 141)	6½	78½	83½	2588
90	(Greece) Stelios Halkias	2576	½ (W 143)	1 (B 70)	½ (W 7)	0 (B 4)	0 (W 33)	0 (B 130)	1 (W 156)	0 (B 127)	1 (W 162)	1 (B 140)	1 (W 73)	0 (B 61)	½ (W 93)	6½	78½	82	2471
91	(Italy) Luca Moroni	2519	0 (W 10)	½ (B 153)	0 (W 33)	½ (B 165)	1 (W 70)	½ (B 117)	1 (W 164)	1 (B 101)	0 (B 67)	0 (W 95)	1 (B 125)	1 (W 111)	0 (B 45)	6½	77½	81½	2524
92	(Egypt) Ahmed Adly	2597	0 (B 132)	1 (W 136)	½ (B 78)	1 (W 108)	0 (B 77)	½ (W 134)	0 (B 63)	1 (W 114)	1 (B 94)	½ (W 46)	½ (B 86)	0 (W 60)	½ (B 82)	6½	77	82½	2458
93	(Uzbekistan) Javokhir Sindarov	2353	0 (B 111)	1 (B 172)	½ (W 34)	½ (W 71)	1 (B 87)	½ (W 146)	½ (B 67)	0 (W 58)	0 (B 72)	1 (W 121)	1 (B 148)	½ (W 96)	½ (B 90)	6½	77	81	2584
94	Klementy Sychev	2461	0 (B 40)	0 (W 18)	½ (B 137)	1 (W 169)	½ (B 95)	½ (W 115)	½ (B 87)	1 (W 72)	0 (W 92)	½ (B 103)	0 (W 81)	1 (B 154)	1 (W 131)	6½	77	80	2569
95	Alexander Riazantsev	2632	0 (W 142)	1 (B 159)	½ (W 73)	0 (B 64)	½ (W 94)	1 (B 155)	½ (W 109)	½ (B 105)	½ (W 53)	1 (B 91)	½ (W 61)	0 (B 69)	½ (W 98)	6½	76	80½	2484
96	(FIDE) Vladislav Kovalev	2647	1 (B 175)	0 (W 60)	0 (B 86)	1 (B 152)	½ (W 129)	0 (B 118)	½ (W 53)	½ (B 140)	1 (W 151)	½ (B 57)	0 (W 69)	½ (B 93)	1 (W 127)	6½	75	79½	2478
97	Sanan Sjugirov	2634	1 (B 156)	0 (W 147)	½ (B 114)	1 (W 150)	0 (B 43)	1 (W 144)	½ (B 46)	0 (W 63)	0 (B 78)	1 (W 126)	0 (B 82)	1 (W 112)	½ (B 86)	6½	74	78	2477
98	Mikhail Kobalia	2543	½ (B 83)	1 (W 169)	0 (B 24)	1 (W 138)	0 (B 49)	0 (W 104)	½ (B 108)	0 (W 82)	½ (B 163)	½ (W 135)	1 (B 136)	1 (W 132)	½ (B 95)	6½	73	76	2438
99	(India) Pentala Harikrishna	2705	0 (B 150)	½ (W 83)	½ (B 55)	1 (W 140)	0 (B 86)	0 (W 63)	½ (B 136)	1 (W 157)	½ (B 126)	0 (B 70)	1 (W 145)	½ (B 73)	1 (W 124)	6½	72½	77	2459
100	(Hungary) Ádám Kozák	2552	0 (W 84)	1 (B 130)	0 (W 143)	0 (B 171)	1 (W 165)	1 (B 153)	0 (W 129)	1 (B 154)	½ (W 33)	1 (B 116)	½ (W 80)	0 (B 38)	½ (W 76)	6½	72	76	2429
101	(Azerbaijan) Rauf Mamedov	2690	0 (B 60)	½ (W 121)	½ (B 140)	0 (W 162)	1 (B 163)	1 (W 114)	½ (B 86)	0 (W 91)	0 (B 142)	1 (B 110)	1 (W 129)	1 (W 89)	0 (B 58)	6½	71½	75	2464
102	(Israel) Ilia Smirin	2663	½ (B 82)	½ (W 114)	½ (B 144)	0 (W 32)	0 (B 55)	½ (W 149)	0 (B 83)	½ (W 135)	1 (B 157)	1 (W 163)	0 (B 104)	1 (W 156)	1 (B 126)	6½	70	74	2437
103	(Uzbekistan) Shamsiddin Vokhidov	2546	½ (B 169)	0 (W 154)	0 (B 157)	1 (W 139)	½ (B 133)	1 (W 162)	0 (B 125)	1 (W 134)	0 (B 82)	½ (W 94)	½ (B 114)	1 (W 144)	½ (B 88)	6½	65½	68½	2435
104	(Azerbaijan) Aydin Suleymanli	2202	1 (W 106)	0 (W 111)	½ (B 58)	1 (B 141)	0 (W 47)	1 (B 98)	1 (W 81)	0 (B 17)	½ (W 68)	0 (B 52)	1 (W 102)	0 (B 71)	0 (B 66)	6	83	88	2586
105	(Romania) Mihnea Costachi	2443	½ (B 20)	½ (W 28)	0 (B 68)	1 (W 56)	½ (B 72)	1 (W 71)	0 (B 146)	½ (W 95)	½ (B 66)	0 (W 111)	0 (B 87)	1 (W 133)	½ (B 115)	6	82	87	2601
106	(Serbia) Aleksandar Inđić	2544	0 (B 104)	½ (W 116)	1 (B 151)	1 (W 133)	0 (B 8)	1 (W 83)	1 (B 62)	0 (W 26)	0 (B 54)	½ (W 130)	½ (B 89)	½ (W 76)	0 (B 72)	6	81½	86½	2504
107	(United States) Fidel Corrales Jimenez	2561	1 (B 123)	½ (W 36)	0 (B 62)	1 (W 157)	0 (B 50)	1 (W 112)	½ (B 89)	0 (W 29)	1 (W 127)	0 (B 83)	0 (W 53)	1 (B 109)	0 (W 70)	6	81½	86	2468
108	(Poland) Bartłomiej Heberla	2437	½ (W 30)	1 (B 38)	0 (W 35)	0 (B 92)	0 (W 79)	1 (B 168)	½ (W 98)	1 (B 119)	0 (W 52)	0 (B 69)	½ (B 117)	1 (W 146)	½ (B 111)	6	81	84½	2602
109	(Norway) Johan-Sebastian Christiansen	2522	½ (B 11)	0 (W 50)	1 (B 166)	0 (W 49)	½ (B 138)	1 (W 123)	½ (B 95)	½ (W 31)	0 (B 36)	0 (W 89)	1 (B 137)	0 (W 107)	1 (B 142)	6	81	84½	2543
110	(India) Arjun Erigaisi	2397	1 (B 56)	1 (W 27)	½ (B 22)	0 (W 24)	0 (B 67)	0 (W 85)	0 (B 115)	1 (W 149)	½ (B 71)	0 (W 101)	½ (B 126)	1 (W 148)	½ (B 113)	6	80½	85½	2601
111	(Georgia (country)) Giga Quparadze	2583	1 (W 93)	1 (B 104)	0 (W 13)	0 (B 17)	1 (W 142)	0 (B 84)	½ (B 65)	½ (W 86)	½ (W 129)	1 (B 105)	0 (W 64)	0 (B 91)	½ (W 108)	6	80½	85½	2496
112	(Algeria) Bilel Bellahcene	2397	1 (W 51)	0 (B 44)	1 (W 37)	½ (B 30)	0 (W 42)	0 (B 107)	0 (W 57)	1 (B 167)	0 (W 131)	½ (B 120)	1 (W 152)	0 (B 97)	1 (W 140)	6	79½	83½	2582
113	(Poland) Mateusz Bartel	2543	1 (W 168)	0 (B 10)	1 (W 164)	½ (W 54)	0 (B 26)	½ (B 143)	1 (W 154)	0 (B 35)	½ (W 70)	0 (B 33)	½ (W 116)	½ (B 130)	½ (W 110)	6	78½	82	2452
114	Ramil Faizrakhmanov	2461	½ (W 35)	½ (B 102)	½ (W 97)	½ (B 38)	0 (W 80)	0 (B 101)	1 (W 155)	0 (B 92)	1 (W 154)	½ (B 119)	½ (W 103)	0 (b 120)	1 (W 143)	6	76½	81	2574
115	(Germany) Andreas Heimann	2616	0 (W 145)	½ (B 149)	0 (W 127)	1 (B 70)	½ (W 155)	½ (B 94)	1 (W 110)	1 (B 116)	½ (W 61)	½ (B 64)	0 (W 33)	0 (B 48)	½ (W 105)	6	76½	81	2418
116	(Israel) Victor Mikhalevski	2366	0 (B 1)	½ (B 106)	0 (W 119)	1 (W 156)	0 (B 134)	1 (W 121)	1 (B 71)	0 (W 115)	1 (B 118)	0 (W 100)	½ (B 113)	0 (W 117)	1 (B 114)	6	75	79	2557
117	Grigoriy Oparin	2725	½ (B 63)	0 (W 43)	½ (B 134)	½ (W 55)	½ (B 82)	½ (W 91)	½ (B 126)	½ (B 143)	½ (W 152)	0 (B 124)	½ (W 108)	1 (B 116)	½ (W 122)	6	74½	79	2480
118	(Azerbaijan) Vasif Durarbayli	2532	½ (B 17)	0 (W 25)	0 (B 138)	1 (W 166)	1 (B 173)	1 (W 96)	0 (B 49)	0 (W 62)	0 (W 116)	1 (B 151)	1 (W 153)	0 (B 81)	½ (W 123)	6	74	75½	2502
119	Vadim Zvjaginsev	2539	0 (B 174)	½ (W 139)	1 (B 116)	0 (W 89)	1 (B 157)	0 (W 18)	½ (B 147)	0 (W 108)	1 (B 137)	½ (W 114)	1 (B 142)	0 (W 45)	½ (B 121)	6	72	76	2442
120	(Georgia (country)) Merab Gagunashvili	2538	0 (B 3)	0 (W 133)	½ (B 155)	0 (W 123)	1 (B 160)	½ (W 136)	0 (B 137)	½ (W 132)	1 (B 158)	½ (W 112)	1 (B 147)	1 (W 114)	0 (B 67)	6	71	75½	2445
121	(Israel) Evgeny Postny	2454	0 (W 76)	½ (B 101)	0 (W 38)	0 (B 130)	1 (W 166)	0 (B 116)	1 (W 158)	0 (B 151)	1 (W 155)	0 (B 93)	1 (W 165)	1 (B 153)	½ (W 119)	6	67½	71	2459
122	(Czech Republic) Štěpán Žilka	2474	0 (W 26)	0 (B 15)	½ (W 130)	0 (B 155)	½ (W 139)	½ (B 158)	0 (W 153)	1 (B 168)	1 (B 170)	½ (W 132)	½ (B 133)	1 (W 135)	½ (B 117)	6	67½	70	2393
123	(Poland) Marcel Kanarek	2296	0 (W 107)	0 (B 53)	½ (W 165)	1 (B 120)	½ (W 141)	0 (B 109)	0 (W 140)	0 (B 156)	1 (B 173)	½ (W 159)	1 (B 149)	1 (W 150)	½ (B 118)	6	64	65½	2489
124	(Spain) Daniil Yuffa	2514	1 (B 18)	0 (W 22)	0 (B 67)	1 (W 168)	1 (B 36)	0 (W 16)	0 (B 56)	1 (W 147)	0 (B 88)	1 (W 117)	0 (B 71)	½ (W 85)	0 (B 99)	5½	84½	88	2638
125	Oleg Vastrukhin	2382	½ (W 42)	1 (B 79)	½ (W 76)	0 (B 21)	0 (W 51)	1 (B 69)	1 (W 103)	0 (B 75)	½ (W 57)	0 (B 58)	0 (W 91)	1 (B 129)	0 (W 73)	5½	84	89½	2579
126	(Czech Republic) Peter Michalik	2515	½ (B 50)	1 (W 11)	½ (B 54)	½ (W 88)	0 (W 30)	0 (B 38)	½ (W 117)	½ (B 153)	½ (W 99)	0 (B 97)	½ (W 110)	1 (B 151)	0 (W 102)	5½	83	87½	2637
127	(India) Raunak Sadhwani	2454	½ (B 88)	0 (W 54)	1 (B 115)	½ (B 80)	½ (W 38)	½ (B 34)	0 (W 52)	1 (W 90)	0 (B 107)	½ (W 87)	1 (B 146)	0 (W 47)	0 (B 96)	5½	82½	87½	2608
128	(Kazakhstan) Rinat Jumabayev	2562	½ (B 77)	½ (W 78)	1 (B 83)	1 (W 18)	0 (B 14)	½ (W 89)	0 (B 15)	0 (W 55)	0 (B 130)	½ (W 136)	½ (B 135)	½ (W 142)	½ (B 137)	5½	81	86	2422
129	(Hungary) Gergely Kantor	2454	½ (B 54)	½ (W 88)	0 (B 146)	1 (W 11)	½ (B 96)	½ (W 72)	1 (B 100)	0 (W 27)	½ (B 111)	0 (W 66)	0 (B 101)	0 (W 125)	1 (B 160)	5½	80½	85	2614
130	(Norway) Kristian Stuvik Holm	2409	0 (B 27)	0 (W 100)	½ (B 122)	1 (W 121)	½ (B 58)	1 (W 90)	0 (B 74)	½ (B 148)	1 (W 128)	½ (B 106)	0 (W 57)	½ (W 113)	0 (B 85)	5½	78½	83½	2549
131	(Egypt) Samy Shoker	2550	0 (B 89)	1 (W 137)	½ (B 173)	0 (W 78)	1 (B 149)	1 (W 147)	0 (B 18)	0 (W 83)	1 (B 112)	1 (W 142)	0 (B 36)	0 (W 50)	0 (B 94)	5½	76½	78	2456
132	(Poland) Oskar Wieczorek	2367	1 (W 92)	0 (B 21)	0 (W 51)	1 (B 69)	0 (W 66)	0 (B 141)	0 (W 148)	½ (B 120)	1 (W 161)	½ (B 122)	1 (W 140)	0 (B 98)	½ (W 146)	5½	74½	78½	2551
133	(Poland) Miłosz Szpar	2315	0 (B 71)	1 (B 120)	½ (W 71)	0 (B 106)	½ (W 103)	½ (W 87)	½ (B 144)	0 (B 53)	1 (W 167)	0 (B 73)	½ (W 122)	0 (B 105)	1 (W 159)	5½	74	78	2519
134	(Poland) Grzegorz Gajewski	2496	½ (W 31)	0 (B 19)	½ (W 117)	½ (B 164)	1 (W 116)	½ (B 92)	0 (W 34)	0 (B 103)	0 (W 145)	½ (B 165)	1 (W 155)	½ (B 143)	½ (W 139)	5½	73½	77½	2508
135	(Kosovo) Nderim Saraci	2414	0 (W 45)	0 (B 34)	1 (W 170)	0 (B 52)	0 (W 69)	0 (B 70)	1 (W 166)	½ (B 102)	1 (W 172)	½ (B 98)	½ (W 128)	0 (B 122)	1 (w 153)	5½	73½	76	2493
136	(Spain) José Fernando Cuenca Jiménez	2421	0 (W 21)	0 (B 92)	0 (W 161)	1 (B 159)	½ (W 167)	½ (B 120)	½ (W 99)	1 (B 164)	0 (W 81)	½ (B 128)	0 (W 98)	½ (B 145)	1 (W 154)	5½	67½	71½	2510
137	(Austria) Felix Blohberger	2409	0 (W 80)	0 (B 131)	½ (W 94)	0 (B 79)	1 (W 169)	½ (B 148)	1 (W 120)	0 (B 141)	0 (W 119)	1 (B 162)	0 (W 109)	1 (B 152)	½ (W 128)	5½	66½	69½	2530
138	(Poland) Krystian Kuźmicz	2314	0 (W 47)	½ (B 141)	1 (W 118)	0 (B 98)	½ (W 109)	0 (B 73)	0 (W 69)	0 (B 159)	0 (W 160)	½ (B 164)	1 (B 168)	1 (W 157)	1 (B 156)	5½	66	69½	2466
139	(Poland) Grzegorz Nasuta	2345	0 (W 59)	½ (B 119)	0 (W 141)	0 (B 103)	½ (B 122)	0 (W 163)	0 (B 159)	0 (W 158)	1 (B 166)	1 (W 161)	1 (B 162)	1 (W 167)	½ (B 134)	5½	60½	64	2471
140	(Poland) Igor Janik	2462	½ (W 19)	0 (B 35)	½ (W 101)	0 (B 99)	0 (B 11)	1 (W 173)	1 (B 123)	½ (W 96)	½ (B 87)	0 (W 90)	0 (B 132)	1 (W 147)	0 (B 112)	5	80	81½	2562
141	(Armenia) Hovhannes Gabuzyan	2535	0 (B 5)	½ (W 138)	1 (B 139)	0 (W 104)	½ (B 123)	1 (W 132)	0 (B 11)	1 (W 137)	0 (B 84)	1 (W 147)	0 (B 72)	0 (W 77)	0 (B 89)	5	78½	83½	2430
142	(Poland) Marcin Dziuba	2424	1 (B 95)	1 (W 67)	0 (B 40)	0 (W 45)	0 (B 111)	0 (W 56)	1 (B 150)	½ (W 87)	1 (W 101)	0 (B 131)	0 (W 119)	½ (B 128)	0 (W 109)	5	78	83	2600
143	(Poland) Paweł Teclaf	2345	½ (B 90)	½ (W 85)	1 (B 100)	0 (W 27)	½ (B 71)	½ (W 113)	½ (B 58)	½ (W 117)	0 (B 74)	0 (W 144)	½ (B 150)	½ (W 134)	0 (B 114)	5	76½	81½	2562
144	Volodar Murzin	2523	0 (W 13)	1 (B 170)	½ (W 102)	0 (B 31)	1 (W 145)	0 (B 97)	½ (W 133)	0 (B 70)	1 (W 156)	1 (B 143)	0 (W 68)	0 (B 103)	0 (W 116)	5	76	78½	2500
145	(Poland) Krzysztof Jakubowski	2399	1 (B 115)	½ (W 23)	0 (B 20)	0 (W 28)	0 (B 144)	½ (W 150)	0 (B 82)	1 (W 169)	1 (B 134)	0 (W 71)	0 (B 99)	½ (W 136)	½ (B 148)	5	75½	78½	2558
146	(Hungary) Viktor Erdős	2601	1 (W 160)	0 (B 84)	1 (W 129)	½ (B 61)	½ (W 154)	½ (B 93)	1 (W 105)	0 (B 51)	0 (W 55)	0 (B 65)	0 (W 127)	0 (B 108)	½ (B 132)	5	75	79½	2419
147	(Netherlands) Lucas van Foreest	2374	1 (W 37)	1 (B 97)	0 (W 44)	½ (W 67)	0 (B 28)	0 (B 131)	½ (W 119)	0 (B 124)	1 (W 159)	0 (B 141)	0 (W 120)	0 (B 140)	1 (W 164)	5	74½	78½	2557
148	(Poland) Maciej Klekowski	2528	0 (W 4)	1 (B 161)	0 (B 88)	0 (W 29)	½ (B 151)	½ (W 137)	1 (B 132)	½ (W 130)	1 (W 153)	0 (B 80)	0 (W 93)	0 (B 110)	½ (W 145)	5	74	78	2453
149	(Poland) Michał Krasenkow	2430	0 (B 72)	½ (W 115)	1 (W 167)	0 (B 34)	0 (W 131)	½ (B 102)	½ (W 171)	0 (B 110)	1 (W 164)	0 (B 153)	0 (W 123)	½ (B 155)	1 (W 162)	5	67½	71	2471
150	(Brazil) Darcy Lima	2505	1 (W 99)	½ (B 76)	0 (W 19)	0 (B 97)	0 (W 164)	½ (B 145)	0 (W 142)	½ (B 155)	½ (W 165)	1 (B 160)	½ (W 143)	0 (B 123)	½ (W 151)	5	67	71	2479
151	(Denmark) Jesper Søndergaard Thybo	2401	½ (W 75)	0 (B 42)	0 (W 106)	½ (B 167)	½ (W 148)	0 (B 152)	1 (B 173)	1 (W 121)	0 (B 96)	0 (W 118)	1 (B 159)	0 (W 126)	½ (B 150)	5	66½	68	2536
152	(Czech Republic) Thai Dai Van Nguyen	2488	½ (B 14)	0 (W 62)	½ (B 11)	0 (W 96)	½ (B 168)	1 (W 151)	0 (B 36)	1 (W 170)	½ (B 117)	0 (W 72)	0 (B 112)	0 (W 137)	½ (B 158)	4½	76	78½	2560
153	(Poland) Jan Klimkowski	2211	0 (B 74)	½ (W 91)	1 (B 172)	½ (W 46)	0 (B 68)	0 (W 100)	1 (B 122)	½ (W 126)	0 (B 148)	1 (W 149)	0 (B 118)	0 (W 121)	0 (B 135)	4½	73	77	2516
154	(Ukraine) Vadym Petrovskyi	2282	½ (W 167)	1 (B 103)	0 (B 23)	1 (W 58)	½ (B 146)	0 (W 68)	0 (B 113)	0 (W 100)	0 (B 114)	½ (W 156)	1 (B 163)	0 (W 94)	0 (B 136)	4½	72½	76½	2525
155	(Austria) Valentin Dragnev	2409	0 (B 23)	0 (B 81)	½ (W 120)	1 (W 122)	½ (B 115)	0 (W 95)	0 (B 114)	½ (W 150)	0 (B 121)	1 (W 168)	0 (B 134)	½ (W 149)	½ (B 161)	4½	70½	74	2508
156	(Romania) Vladislav Nevednichy	2425	0 (W 97)	0 (B 37)	0 (W 171)	0 (B 116)	1 (-)	1 (W 160)	0 (B 90)	1 (W 123)	0 (B 144)	½ (B 154)	1 (W 167)	0 (B 102)	0 (W 138)	4½	68½	72½	2457
157	(Ukraine) Li Min Peng	2411	½ (W 38)	0 (B 75)	1 (W 103)	0 (B 107)	0 (W 119)	0 (B 167)	1 (W 168)	0 (B 99)	0 (W 102)	½ (B 158)	½ (W 164)	0 (B 138)	1 (B 169)	4½	67½	70½	2490
158	(Poland) Jonasz Baum	2343	0 (B 87)	0 (W 69)	0 (B 162)	1 (W 172)	0 (B 56)	½ (W 122)	0 (B 121)	1 (B 139)	0 (W 120)	½ (W 157)	½ (B 160)	½ (B 166)	½ (W 152)	4½	65½	69	2481
159	(Sweden) Pontus Carlsson	2436	0 (B 22)	0 (W 95)	0 (B 160)	0 (W 136)	½ (B 172)	½ (B 166)	1 (W 139)	1 (W 138)	0 (B 147)	½ (B 123)	0 (W 151)	1 (W 169)	0 (B 133)	4½	65	68	2412
160	(Poland) Mateusz Kołosowski	2371	0 (B 146)	0 (W 58)	1 (W 159)	0 (B 57)	0 (W 120)	0 (B 156)	0 (B 170)	1 (W 166)	1 (B 138)	0 (W 150)	½ (W 158)	1 (B 165)	0 (W 129)	4½	62½	65	2451
161	(Kyrgyzstan) Semetey Tologontegin	2300	0 (B 68)	0 (W 148)	1 (B 136)	0 (W 85)	0 (B 63)	1 (W 172)	0 (B 162)	0 (W 163)	0 (B 132)	0 (B 139)	1 (-)	1 (W 170)	½ (W 155)	4½	61	63½	2448
162	(Qatar) Husain Aziz	2430	0 (W 44)	0 (B 51)	1 (w 158)	1 (B 101)	0 (W 37)	0 (B 103)	1 (W 161)	0 (B 69)	0 (B 90)	0 (W 137)	0 (W 139)	1 (-)	0 (B 149)	4	74	77½	2503
163	(United States) Andrew Tang	2427	1 (B 174)	0 (W 72)	0 (B 66)	0 (B 37)	0 (W 101)	1 (B 139)	0 (W 70)	1 (B 161)	½ (W 98)	0 (B 102)	0 (W 154)	½ (B 164)	0 (-)	4	73½	77½	2399
164	(India) Aditya Mittal	1488	1 (W 119)	0 (B 6)	0 (B 113)	½ (W 134)	1 (B 150)	0 (W 11)	0 (B 91)	0 (W 136)	0 (B 149)	½ (W 138)	½ (B 157)	½ (W 163)	0 (B 147)	4	72½	76½	2513
165	(Poland) Daniel Sadzikowski	2414	0 (B 67)	0 (W 56)	½ (B 123)	½ (W 91)	0 (B 100)	½ (W 170)	1 (B 169)	0 (W 71)	½ (B 150)	½ (W 134)	0 (B 121)	0 (W 160)	½ (B 166)	4	67½	70½	2465
166	(Poland) Rafał Lubczyński	2289	0 (W 52)	½ (B 32)	0 (W 109)	0 (B 118)	0 (B 121)	½ (W 159)	0 (B 135)	0 (B 160)	0 (W 139)	1 (-)	1 (B 173)	½ (W 158)	½ (W 165)	4	64½	66	2394
167	(Italy) Danyyil Dvirnyy	2550	½ (B 154)	0 (W 77)	0 (B 149)	½ (W 151)	½ (B 136)	1 (W 157)	0 (B 55)	0 (W 112)	0 (B 133)	1 (W 170)	0 (B 156)	0 (B 139)	½ (W 168)	4	63½	66	2374
168	(Poland) Piotr Łopusiewicz	2197	0 (B 113)	0 (W 86)	1 (-)	0 (B 124)	½ (W 152)	0 (W 108)	0 (B 157)	0 (W 122)	1 (B 169)	0 (B 155)	0 (W 138)	1 (W 173)	½ (B 167)	4	61	62½	2392
169	(Wales) Grzegorz Toczek	2220	½ (W 103)	0 (B 98)	0 (W 32)	0 (B 94)	0 (B 137)	1 (-)	0 (W 165)	0 (B 145)	0 (W 168)	1 (W 173)	1 (B 170)	0 (B 159)	0 (W 157)	3½	61	62½	2370
170	(Venezuela) Cristobal Jose Blanco Acevedo	2289	0 (B 66)	0 (W 144)	0 (B 135)	1 (-)	0 (W 53)	½ (B 165)	1 (W 160)	0 (B 152)	0 (W 122)	0 (B 167)	0 (W 169)	0 (B 161)	½ (w 173)	3	59½	61	2388
171	(Azerbaijan) Vugar Asadli	2309	0 (B 12)	0 (W 48)	1 (B 156)	1 (W 100)	0 (B 46)	0 (W 58)	½ (B 149)	0 (-)	0 (-)	0 (-)	0 (-)	0 (-)	0 (-)	2½	71½	75	2513
172	(Bosnia and Herzegovina) Denis Kadrić	2542	0 (B 9)	0 (W 93)	0 (W 153)	0 (B 158)	½ (W 159)	0 (B 161)	1 (-)	1 (W 173)	0 (B 135)	0 (-)	0 (-)	0 (-)	0 (-)	2½	59	60½	2242
173	(Tajikistan) Mukhammad Yunusov	1832	0 (B 57)	1 (-)	½ (W 131)	0 (B 48)	0 (W 118)	0 (B 140)	0 (W 151)	0 (B 172)	0 (W 123)	0 (B 169)	0 (W 166)	0 (B 168)	½ (B 170)	2	62	64½	2405
174	(Spain) Eduardo Iturrizaga Bonelli	2634	0 (W 163)	0 (-)	0 (-)	0 (-)	0 (-)	0 (-)	0 (-)	0 (-)	0 (-)	0 (-)	0 (-)	0 (-)	0 (-)	0	51	52	0
175	(Slovakia) Samir Sahidi	2436	0 (W 96)	0 (-)	0 (-)	0 (-)	0 (-)	0 (-)	0 (-)	0 (-)	0 (-)	0 (-)	0 (-)	0 (-)	0 (-)	0	51	52	0
176	(Yemen) Basheer Al-Qudaimi	2412	0 (B 39)	0 (-)	0 (-)	0 (-)	0 (-)	0 (-)	0 (-)	0 (-)	0 (-)	0 (-)	0 (-)	0 (-)	0 (-)	0	51	52	0

Four players (defending world champion Magnus Carlsen, Nodirbek Abdusattorov, Ian Nepomniachtchi, and Fabiano Caruana) were tied for first after 13 rounds. Among these, the two players with the highest Buchholz Cut 1 score (Abdusattorov and Nepomniachtchi) played a title play-off in blitz time controls to decide the winner. Abdusattorov won the match 1.5 - 0.5 to become World Rapid Champion.

== Women's tournament results ==
The following table lists all participants, with the results from the 13 rounds. They are ranked according to the results, taking into account the tie-breaks.

Notation: "1 (B 83)" indicates a win (1 point) with black pieces (B) against player of rank 83 (Mihaela Sandu). The first tiebreak (labeled BC1) is the Buchholz Cut 1 score, the second tiebreak (labeled BS) is the Buchholz score, and the third tiebreak (labelled AROC1) is the average rating of opponents cut 1.

Rank	Name	Rating	1	2	3	4	5	6	7	8	9	10	11	Total	BC1	BS	AROC1
1	Alexandra Kosteniuk	2515	1 (B 83)	1 (W 56)	1 (B 45)	1 (W 23)	1 (B 3)	1 (W 60)	½ (B 5)	1 (W 15)	½ (B 6)	½ (W 2)	½ (B 4)	9	69	73½	2377
2	(Kazakhstan) Bibisara Assaubayeva	2369	1 (B 81)	0 (W 22)	½ (B 80)	1 (W 26)	1 (B 73)	1 (W 34)	1 (B 60)	½ (W 3)	1 (B 5)	½ (B 1)	1 (W 7)	8½	65	69½	2263
3	Valentina Gunina	2499	1 (B 50)	1 (W 36)	1 (B 44)	1 (W 8)	0 (W 1)	1 (B 7)	0 (W 4)	½ (B 2)	1 (W 22)	1 (B 23)	½ (W 9)	8	72½	78	2374
4	Kateryna Lagno	2545	1 (B 47)	0 (W 46)	1 (W 62)	1 (B 17)	1 (B 45)	½ (W 22)	1 (B 3)	½ (W 5)	½ (B 23)	1 (W 11)	½ (W 1)	8	68½	73½	2299
5	(Kazakhstan) Assel Serikbay	2023	1 (W 54)	½ (W 55)	1 (B 10)	½ (B 6)	1 (W 19)	1 (B 68)	½ (W 1)	½ (B 4)	0 (W 2)	1 (B 30)	½ (W 16)	7½	72	77	2399
6	(India) Humpy Koneru	2483	½ (B 70)	½ (W 97)	1 (B 50)	½ (W 5)	1 (B 36)	1 (W 10)	1 (B 22)	½ (W 23)	½ (W 1)	½ (B 9)	½ (W 12)	7½	68	71	2281
7	(Georgia (country)) Nana Dzagnidze	2471	1 (B 80)	1 (W 25)	½ (B 60)	1 (W 22)	1 (B 14)	0 (W 3)	0 (B 23)	1 (W 33)	1 (B 31)	1 (W 15)	0 (B 2)	7½	67½	72	2307
8	(Germany) Elisabeth Paehtz	2367	1 (W 76)	1 (B 41)	1 (W 33)	0 (B 3)	½ (W 63)	0 (B 24)	1 (W 17)	1 (B 44)	0 (W 9)	1 (B 48)	1 (W 26)	7½	63	67½	2232
9	(Bulgaria) Antoaneta Stefanova	2443	½ (B 97)	1 (W 70)	½ (B 42)	½ (W 36)	1 (B 44)	½ (W 61)	½ (B 14)	1 (W 60)	1 (B 8)	½ (W 6)	½ (B 3)	7½	62½	65½	2291
10	(Germany) Marta Michna	2291	1 (W 69)	½ (B 40)	0 (W 5)	1 (B 84)	1 (W 67)	0 (B 6)	1 (W 74)	0 (B 22)	1 (W 25)	1 (B 24)	1 (W 23)	7½	61½	65½	2146
11	(Kazakhstan) Zhansaya Abdumalik	2449	0 (W 35)	0 (B 76)	1 (W 88)	1 (B 79)	1 (W 77)	½ (B 17)	1 (W 39)	1 (B 24)	1 (W 12)	0 (B 4)	1 (W 27)	7½	60½	64	2236
12	(Azerbaijan) Gulnar Mammadova	2388	1 (B 103)	1 (W 66)	0 (B 22)	1 (W 47)	½ (B 61)	½ (B 63)	1 (W 35)	1 (W 34)	0 (B 11)	1 (W 33)	½ (B 6)	7½	60	65	2246
13	(Ukraine) Anna Muzychuk	2497	½ (W 48)	½ (B 64)	1 (W 41)	0 (B 46)	1 (W 74)	½ (B 27)	½ (W 32)	1 (B 63)	1 (W 35)	½ (B 26)	1 (W 28)	7½	58½	63	2198
14	(India) Vaishali Rameshbabu	2201	1 (B 90)	½ (W 34)	1 (B 20)	1 (W 15)	0 (W 7)	½ (B 28)	½ (W 9)	1 (B 18)	½ (W 30)	½ (B 16)	½ (W 21)	7	69	72½	2407
15	(Ukraine) Mariya Muzychuk	2501	½ (W 64)	1 (B 48)	1 (W 27)	0 (B 14)	1 (W 32)	1 (B 30)	1 (W 24)	0 (B 1)	1 (W 28)	0 (B 7)	½ (W 18)	7	68½	73½	2310
16	Aleksandra Goryachkina	2521	1 (W 77)	1 (B 17)	½ (W 18)	0 (B 51)	½ (W 27)	0 (B 44)	1 (W 40)	1 (B 32)	1 (W 61)	½ (W 14)	½ (B 5)	7	63½	68	2225
17	(Mongolia) Davaademberel Nomin-Erdene	2235	1 (B 52)	0 (W 16)	1 (B 85)	0 (W 4)	1 (B 29)	½ (W 11)	0 (B 8)	1 (W 65)	½ (B 62)	1 (W 66)	1 (B 34)	7	63	67	2253
18	(Ukraine) Inna Gaponenko	2348	1 (W 79)	1 (B 35)	½ (B 16)	½ (W 61)	0 (B 22)	1 (W 66)	½ (B 47)	0 (W 14)	1 (B 36)	1 (B 38)	½ (B 15)	7	61	65½	2240
19	(Luxembourg) Elvira Berend	2344	0 (B 29)	1 (W 78)	1 (B 97)	1 (W 33)	0 (B 5)	0 (W 47)	0 (B 66)	1 (W 74)	1 (B 70)	1 (W 62)	1 (B 42)	7	55½	58½	2102
20	Alina Kashlinskaya	2377	½ (W 84)	1 (B 73)	0 (W 14)	½ (B 67)	½ (W 64)	0 (W 65)	½ (B 37)	1 (B 78)	1 (W 41)	1 (B 63)	1 (B 33)	7	53½	57½	2107
21	Olga Girya	2380	½ (B 26)	0 (W 75)	0 (B 94)	1 (W 99)	1 (B 96)	1 (W 70)	0 (B 25)	1 (W 66)	1 (B 47)	1 (W 22)	½ (B 14)	7	53½	54½	2129
22	(Greece) Ekaterini Pavlidou	2110	1 (W 101)	1 (B 2)	1 (W 12)	0 (B 7)	1 (W 18)	½ (B 4)	0 (W 6)	1 (W 10)	0 (B 3)	0 (B 21)	1 (W 49)	6½	73½	78	2422
23	Polina Shuvalova	2400	1 (W 65)	1 (B 39)	1 (W 46)	0 (B 1)	½ (W 24)	1 (B 51)	1 (W 7)	½ (B 6)	½ (W 4)	0 (W 3)	0 (B 10)	6½	71	76	2379
24	Leya Garifullina	2245	0 (B 37)	1 (W 82)	1 (B 96)	1 (W 29)	½ (B 23)	1 (W 8)	0 (B 15)	0 (W 11)	1 (B 50)	0 (W 10)	1 (B 52)	6½	64	67½	2222
25	(Germany) Annmarie Muetsch	2203	1 (W 71)	0 (B 7)	0 (W 29)	1 (B 43)	½ (W 37)	1 (B 67)	1 (W 21)	0 (W 31)	0 (B 10)	1 (W 55)	1 (B 45)	6½	63	68	2217
26	(Azerbaijan) Khanim Balajayeva	2093	½ (W 21)	0 (B 49)	1 (W 86)	0 (B 2)	1 (W 95)	1 (B 53)	1 (W 51)	½ (W 61)	1 (B 34)	½ (W 13)	0 (B 8)	6½	62	65½	2305
27	(Ukraine) Iulija Osmak	2253	1 (B 82)	½ (W 37)	0 (B 15)	1 (W 94)	½ (B 16)	½ (W 13)	0 (B 62)	1 (W 73)	1 (B 64)	1 (W 31)	0 (B 11)	6½	60½	64	2254
28	(Armenia) Elina Danielian	2359	0 (B 33)	½ (W 43)	1 (B 58)	1 (W 75)	1 (B 65)	½ (W 14)	½ (B 61)	1 (W 47)	0 (B 15)	1 (W 52)	0 (B 13)	6½	60	64½	2191
29	(Poland) Oliwia Kiołbasa	2067	1 (W 19)	0 (W 45)	1 (B 25)	0 (B 24)	0 (W 17)	1 (B 77)	0 (W 49)	1 (B 82)	1 (W 54)	1 (B 61)	½ (W 30)	6½	59½	64	2274
30	(Iran) Atousa Pourkashiyan	2290	½ (B 94)	1 (W 58)	1 (B 75)	0 (W 60)	1 (B 38)	0 (W 15)	1 (B 65)	1 (W 62)	½ (B 14)	0 (W 5)	½ (B 29)	6½	59	62½	2104
31	(Turkey) Ekaterina Atalik	2419	½ (W 73)	½ (B 84)	1 (W 35)	1 (B 53)	0 (W 68)	1 (B 46)	½ (W 44)	1 (B 25)	0 (W 7)	0 (B 27)	1 (W 48)	6½	58	62	2232
32	(Poland) Monika Soćko	2238	0 (B 62)	1 (W 92)	1 (B 79)	½ (W 38)	0 (B 15)	1 (W 73)	½ (B 13)	0 (W 16)	½ (B 37)	1 (W 64)	1 (B 50)	6½	58	61½	2180
33	(Kazakhstan) Meruert Kamalidenova	2070	1 (W 28)	1 (W 57)	0 (B 8)	0 (B 19)	1 (W 54)	1 (W 42)	1 (B 68)	0 (B 7)	1 (W 49)	0 (B 12)	0 (W 20)	6	65	70	2358
34	(Georgia (country)) Nino Batsiashvili	2380	1 (W 96)	½ (B 14)	½ (W 53)	1 (B 39)	1 (W 46)	0 (B 2)	1 (W 63)	0 (B 12)	0 (W 26)	1 (B 35)	0 (W 17)	6	64	67½	2232
35	Anastasya Paramzina	2130	1 (B 11)	0 (W 18)	0 (B 31)	1 (W 100)	1 (B 57)	1 (W 45)	0 (B 12)	1 (W 68)	0 (B 13)	0 (W 34)	1 (B 60)	6	62½	63½	2367
36	(Czech Republic) Julia Movsesian	2224	1 (W 98)	0 (B 3)	1 (W 76)	½ (B 9)	0 (W 6)	½ (B 69)	1 (W 71)	1 (B 54)	0 (W 18)	½ (B 49)	½ (W 41)	6	61	63½	2237
37	(Azerbaijan) Govhar Beydullayeva	1924	1 (W 24)	½ (B 27)	0 (W 51)	½ (W 56)	½ (B 25)	0 (B 39)	½ (W 20)	1 (B 76)	½ (W 32)	½ (B 53)	1 (W 63)	6	60½	65	2247
38	(India) Vantika Agrawal	1729	1 (W 59)	0 (W 44)	1 (B 66)	½ (B 32)	0 (W 30)	0 (B 54)	1 (W 80)	1 (B 39)	1 (W 46)	0 (B 18)	½ (W 51)	6	58½	63	2259
39	(Poland) Klaudia Kulon	2227	1 (B 72)	0 (W 23)	1 (B 69)	0 (W 34)	½ (B 52)	1 (W 37)	0 (B 11)	0 (W 38)	½ (B 40)	1 (W 75)	1 (B 62)	6	58	62½	2068
40	(Kazakhstan) Nazerke Nurgali	2002	1 (W 87)	½ (W 10)	0 (B 68)	½ (B 49)	½ (W 53)	1 (W 56)	0 (B 16)	0 (B 46)	½ (W 39)	1 (B 84)	1 (W 61)	6	56½	60½	2290
41	(Poland) Aleksandra Lach	2132	1 (B 102)	0 (W 8)	0 (B 13)	0 (B 69)	1 (W 85)	½ (B 91)	1 (W 93)	1 (W 45)	0 (B 20)	1 (W 44)	½ (B 36)	6	56½	60	2181
42	Baira Kovanova	2255	½ (W 86)	1 (B 91)	½ (W 9)	½ (B 65)	½ (W 62)	0 (B 33)	1 (W 78)	0 (B 49)	1 (W 67)	1 (B 43)	0 (W 19)	6	55½	59	2127
43	Ekaterina Smirnova	2064	0 (B 57)	½ (B 28)	½ (W 93)	0 (W 25)	1 (B 99)	0 (W 55)	1 (B 97)	1 (W 72)	1 (B 68)	0 (W 42)	1 (B 66)	6	51	52	2165
44	(Azerbaijan) Turkan Mamedyarova	2239	1 (W 67)	1 (B 38)	0 (W 3)	1 (B 71)	0 (W 9)	1 (W 16)	½ (B 31)	0 (W 8)	0 (B 52)	0 (B 41)	1 (W 81)	5½	63½	68	2192
45	(United States) Anna Zatonskih	2327	1 (W 78)	1 (B 29)	0 (W 1)	1 (B 64)	0 (W 4)	0 (B 35)	½ (W 48)	0 (B 41)	1 (W 80)	1 (B 59)	0 (W 25)	5½	62	66½	2229
46	Evgenija Ovod	2235	1 (W 93)	1 (B 4)	0 (B 23)	1 (W 13)	0 (B 34)	0 (W 31)	½ (B 52)	1 (W 40)	0 (B 38)	0 (W 50)	1 (B 74)	5½	62	65½	2183
47	(Ukraine) Evgeniya Doluhanova	2194	0 (W 4)	1 (B 88)	1 (W 99)	0 (B 12)	1 (W 71)	1 (B 19)	½ (W 18)	0 (B 28)	0 (B 21)	½ (B 51)	½ (W 53)	5½	62	63	2249
48	(Poland) Alicja Śliwicka	2166	½ (B 13)	0 (W 15)	0 (B 74)	1 (W 58)	½ (B 75)	1 (W 72)	½ (B 45)	1 (W 55)	1 (W 60)	0 (W 8)	0 (B 31)	5½	59	63½	2247
49	(India) Padmini Rout	2337	½ (B 75)	1 (W 26)	0 (B 61)	½ (W 40)	½ (B 50)	½ (W 62)	1 (B 29)	1 (W 42)	0 (B 33)	½ (W 36)	0 (B 22)	5½	59	63½	2130
50	(Azerbaijan) Zeinab Mamedyarova	2171	0 (W 3)	1 (B 95)	0 (W 6)	1 (B 85)	½ (W 49)	0 (B 74)	1 (W 69)	1 (B 51)	0 (W 24)	1 (B 46)	0 (W 32)	5½	58½	62	2209
51	Anastasia Bodnaruk	2275	½ (B 58)	1 (W 94)	1 (B 37)	1 (W 16)	0 (B 60)	0 (W 23)	0 (B 26)	0 (W 50)	1 (B 77)	½ (W 47)	½ (B 38)	5½	58	61½	2168
52	(Poland) Barbara Goraj	1816	0 (W 17)	0 (B 77)	1 (W 87)	1 (B 101)	½ (W 39)	½ (B 64)	½ (W 46)	1 (B 59)	1 (W 44)	0 (B 28)	0 (W 24)	5½	56½	60½	2265
53	(Serbia) Teodora Injac	2231	½ (B 74)	1 (W 89)	½ (B 34)	0 (W 31)	½ (B 40)	0 (W 26)	0 (B 73)	1 (W 93)	1 (B 65)	½ (W 37)	½ (B 47)	5½	54½	58	2083
54	(Poland) Jolanta Zawadzka	2318	0 (B 5)	0 (W 85)	1 (B 92)	1 (W 72)	0 (B 33)	1 (W 38)	1 (B 75)	0 (W 36)	0 (B 29)	½ (W 81)	1 (B 73)	5½	54	57½	2034
55	(Ukraine) Natalia Zhukova	2312	1 (W 85)	½ (B 5)	0 (W 63)	0 (B 73)	½ (W 84)	1 (B 43)	½ (W 64)	0 (B 48)	1 (W 91)	0 (B 25)	1 (W 71)	5½	53	56½	2102
56	Aleksandra Maltsevskaya	2228	1 (W 95)	0 (B 1)	½ (W 84)	½ (B 37)	½ (W 69)	0 (B 40)	1 (W 79)	0 (B 64)	0 (W 58)	1 (B 91)	1 (W 76)	5½	53	56½	2079
57	(Romania) Irina Bulmaga	2343	1 (W 43)	0 (B 33)	0 (W 65)	1 (B 76)	0 (W 35)	0 (B 78)	1 (W 85)	1 (B 69)	0 (W 63)	1 (B 67)	½ (W 58)	5½	52½	56½	2065
58	Elena Semenova	1967	½ (W 51)	0 (B 30)	0 (W 28)	0 (B 48)	1 (B 92)	½ (W 81)	1 (B 96)	½ (W 77)	1 (B 56)	½ (W 60)	½ (B 57)	5½	52½	56	2227
59	(Poland) Joanna Dworakowska	2221	0 (B 38)	0 (W 67)	0 (B 72)	½ (W 92)	1 (B 100)	1 (B 94)	1 (W 91)	0 (W 52)	1 (B 74)	0 (W 45)	1 (B 79)	5½	46	47	1930
60	(Ukraine) Nataliya Buksa	2237	1 (W 88)	1 (B 99)	½ (W 7)	1 (B 30)	1 (W 51)	0 (B 1)	0 (W 2)	0 (B 9)	0 (W 48)	½ (B 58)	0 (W 35)	5	65	66	2252
61	Alina Bivol	2252	1 (W 92)	½ (B 62)	1 (W 49)	½ (B 18)	½ (W 12)	½ (B 9)	½ (W 28)	½ (B 26)	0 (B 16)	0 (W 29)	0 (B 40)	5	64½	68	2249
62	(Kazakhstan) Liya Kurmangaliyeva	1894	1 (W 32)	½ (W 61)	0 (B 4)	1 (W 70)	½ (B 42)	½ (B 49)	1 (W 27)	0 (B 30)	½ (W 17)	0 (B 19)	0 (W 39)	5	64	69	2298
63	(Israel) Marsel Efroimski	2195	½ (B 89)	1 (W 74)	1 (B 55)	½ (W 68)	½ (B 8)	½ (W 12)	0 (B 34)	0 (W 13)	1 (B 57)	0 (W 20)	0 (B 37)	5	61½	65½	2265
64	(Bulgaria) Nurgyul Salimova	2181	½ (B 15)	½ (W 13)	1 (B 100)	0 (W 45)	½ (B 20)	½ (W 52)	½ (B 55)	1 (W 56)	0 (W 27)	0 (B 32)	½ (W 69)	5	61½	62½	2254
65	(Spain) Marta García Martín	2108	0 (B 23)	1 (W 72)	1 (B 57)	½ (W 42)	0 (W 28)	1 (B 20)	0 (W 30)	0 (B 17)	0 (W 53)	1 (B 80)	½ (W 68)	5	60	64½	2290
66	(Ukraine) Olga Babiy	2196	1 (W 100)	0 (B 12)	0 (W 38)	1 (B 78)	1 (W 93)	0 (B 18)	1 (W 19)	0 (B 21)	1 (W 71)	0 (B 17)	0 (W 43)	5	60	61	2108
67	(Netherlands) Anna-Maja Kazarian	1917	0 (B 44)	1 (B 59)	1 (W 77)	½ (W 20)	0 (B 10)	0 (W 25)	½ (B 70)	1 (W 75)	0 (B 42)	0 (W 57)	1 (B 86)	5	57½	61½	2233
68	Olga Badelka	2279	½ (W 91)	1 (B 86)	1 (W 40)	½ (B 63)	1 (B 31)	0 (W 5)	0 (W 33)	0 (B 35)	0 (W 43)	½ (B 69)	½ (B 65)	5	57	60½	2098
69	Alisa Nur-Mukhametova	1989	0 (B 10)	1 (B 87)	0 (W 39)	1 (W 41)	½ (B 56)	½ (W 36)	0 (B 50)	0 (W 57)	1 (B 83)	½ (W 68)	½ (B 64)	5	56	60	2243
70	(Ukraine) Anastasiya Rakhmangulova	2152	½ (W 6)	0 (B 9)	1 (W 91)	0 (B 62)	1 (W 94)	0 (B 21)	½ (W 67)	1 (B 86)	0 (W 19)	0 (B 71)	1 (W 84)	5	55½	59	2147
71	(Poland) Weronika Zabrzańska	1725	0 (B 25)	1 (W 81)	1 (B 83)	0 (W 44)	0 (B 47)	1 (W 97)	0 (B 36)	1 (W 87)	0 (B 66)	1 (W 70)	0 (B 55)	5	52	55	2212
72	(Poland) Wiktoria Śmietańska	1772	0 (W 39)	0 (B 65)	1 (W 59)	0 (B 54)	1 (W 101)	0 (B 48)	1 (W 84)	0 (B 43)	1 (W 78)	½ (B 76)	½ (W 82)	5	51	55	2127
73	(Argentina) Maria Florencia Fernandez	2116	½ (B 31)	0 (W 20)	1 (B 89)	1 (W 55)	0 (W 2)	0 (B 32)	1 (W 53)	0 (B 27)	0 (W 84)	1 (B 93)	0 (W 54)	4½	59½	63	2242
74	(Poland) Martyna Wikar	1785	½ (W 53)	0 (B 63)	1 (W 48)	1 (W 80)	0 (B 13)	1 (W 50)	0 (B 10)	0 (B 19)	0 (W 59)	1 (B 77)	0 (W 46)	4½	59	63½	2254
75	(Poland) Marta Bartel	2057	½ (W 49)	1 (B 21)	0 (W 30)	0 (B 28)	½ (W 48)	1 (B 84)	0 (W 54)	0 (B 67)	1 (W 82)	0 (B 39)	½ (W 78)	4½	56½	60½	2217
76	Viktoriya Loskutova	2075	0 (B 8)	1 (W 11)	0 (B 36)	0 (W 57)	0 (B 98)	1 (W 90)	1 (B 83)	0 (W 37)	1 (B 86)	½ (W 72)	0 (B 56)	4½	54½	57	2120
77	(France) Nino Maisuradze	2189	0 (B 16)	1 (W 52)	0 (B 67)	1 (W 90)	0 (B 11)	0 (W 29)	1 (B 98)	½ (B 58)	0 (W 51)	0 (W 74)	1 (B 92)	4½	54	56½	2047
78	Irina Utiatskaja	2051	0 (B 45)	0 (B 19)	1 (W 98)	0 (W 66)	1 (B 83)	1 (W 57)	0 (B 42)	0 (W 20)	0 (B 72)	1 (W 88)	½ (B 75)	4½	53	55½	2175
79	Mariya Yakimova	2069	0 (B 18)	1 (B 101)	0 (W 32)	0 (W 11)	1 (B 90)	½ (W 98)	0 (B 56)	0 (B 80)	1 (W 95)	1 (B 87)	0 (W 59)	4½	52	54½	2184
80	Galina Strutinskaia	2131	0 (W 7)	1 (B 98)	½ (W 2)	0 (B 74)	½ (W 91)	½ (B 93)	0 (B 38)	1 (W 79)	0 (B 45)	0 (W 65)	1 (W 95)	4½	52	54½	2044
81	(Slovenia) Spela Kolaric	2078	0 (W 2)	0 (B 71)	0 (W 95)	1 (B 88)	½ (W 82)	½ (B 58)	0 (W 86)	1 (B 89)	1 (W 92)	½ (B 54)	0 (B 44)	4½	49½	53	2012
82	(Poland) Maria Malicka	1947	0 (W 27)	0 (B 24)	0 (W 101)	1 (B 87)	½ (B 81)	½ (W 96)	1 (B 94)	0 (W 29)	0 (B 75)	1 (W 90)	½ (B 72)	4½	48½	52	2126
83	(Romania) Mihaela Sandu	2185	0 (W 1)	½ (B 93)	0 (W 71)	½ (B 86)	0 (W 78)	1 (B 95)	0 (W 76)	1 (B 85)	0 (W 69)	½ (B 92)	1 (W 91)	4½	46½	50	2009
84	(Poland) Anna Kubicka	2092	½ (B 20)	½ (W 31)	½ (B 56)	0 (W 10)	½ (B 55)	0 (W 75)	0 (B 72)	1 (W 88)	1 (B 73)	0 (W 40)	0 (B 70)	4	56½	60	2185
85	(Poland) Honorata Kucharska	2005	0 (B 55)	1 (B 54)	0 (W 17)	0 (W 50)	0 (B 41)	1 (W 100)	0 (B 57)	0 (W 83)	1 (B 97)	½ (B 95)	½ (W 87)	4	49½	50½	2189
86	(Poland) Michalina Rudzińska	1962	½ (B 42)	0 (W 68)	0 (B 26)	½ (W 83)	0 (B 97)	1 (W 99)	1 (B 81)	0 (W 70)	0 (W 76)	1 (B 89)	0 (W 67)	4	48	49	2076
87	(Ukraine) Maria Efimenko	2302	0 (B 40)	0 (W 69)	0 (B 52)	0 (W 82)	1 (B 89)	½ (W 88)	1 (B 90)	0 (B 71)	1 (W 98)	0 (W 79)	½ (B 85)	4	45½	48	1886
88	(Poland) Pola Parol	1892	0 (B 60)	0 (W 47)	0 (B 11)	0 (W 81)	1 (-)	½ (B 87)	½ (W 95)	0 (B 84)	1 (W 99)	0 (B 78)	1 (W 93)	4	45	46	2040
89	(Poland) Klara Szczotka	1606	½ (W 63)	0 (B 53)	0 (W 73)	0 (B 91)	0 (W 87)	½ (B 92)	1 (B 100)	0 (W 81)	1 (B 96)	0 (W 86)	1 (B 98)	4	40½	41½	2064
90	(Poland) Magdalena Budkiewicz	1667	0 (W 14)	0 (B 96)	1 (-)	0 (B 77)	0 (W 79)	0 (B 76)	0 (W 87)	1 (B 99)	1 (W 100)	0 (B 82)	1 (W 97)	4	40½	41½	2007
91	(Poland) Anna Jakubowska	1976	½ (B 68)	0 (W 42)	0 (B 70)	1 (W 89)	½ (B 80)	½ (W 41)	0 (B 59)	1 (W 98)	0 (B 55)	0 (W 56)	0 (B 83)	3½	51	53½	2164
92	(Poland) Liwia Jarocka	1927	0 (B 61)	0 (B 32)	0 (W 54)	½ (B 59)	0 (W 58)	½ (W 89)	1 (B 99)	1 (W 96)	0 (B 81)	½ (W 83)	0 (W 77)	3½	49	50	2116
93	(Kyrgyzstan) Aizhan Alymbai kyzy	1811	0 (B 46)	½ (W 83)	½ (B 43)	1 (W 97)	0 (B 66)	½ (W 80)	0 (B 41)	0 (B 53)	1 (W 94)	0 (W 73)	0 (B 88)	3½	48	51	2139
94	(Ukraine) Sofiia Hryzlova	1981	½ (W 30)	0 (B 51)	1 (W 21)	0 (B 27)	0 (B 70)	0 (W 59)	0 (W 82)	1 (B 100)	0 (B 93)	0 (W 97)	1 (W 99)	3½	48	49	2110
95	(Poland) Emilia Dyląg	1776	0 (B 56)	0 (W 50)	1 (B 81)	½ (W 96)	0 (B 26)	0 (W 83)	½ (B 88)	1 (W 97)	0 (B 79)	½ (W 85)	0 (B 80)	3½	46½	49½	2118
96	(Armenia) Susanna Gaboyan	2107	0 (B 34)	1 (W 90)	0 (W 24)	½ (B 95)	0 (W 21)	½ (B 82)	0 (W 58)	0 (B 92)	0 (W 89)	½ (B 98)	1 (B 100)	3½	46½	47½	1969
97	(Ecuador) Carla Heredia Serrano	2117	½ (W 9)	½ (B 6)	0 (W 19)	0 (B 93)	1 (W 86)	0 (B 71)	0 (W 43)	0 (B 95)	0 (W 85)	1 (B 94)	0 (B 90)	3	51½	55	2059
98	(Israel) Michelle Katkov	1747	0 (B 36)	0 (W 80)	0 (B 78)	1 (-)	1 (W 76)	½ (B 79)	0 (W 77)	0 (B 91)	0 (B 87)	½ (W 96)	0 (W 89)	3	43½	47	2073
99	(Brazil) Cibele Florencio Da Silva	1414	1 (-)	0 (W 60)	0 (B 47)	0 (B 21)	0 (W 43)	0 (B 86)	0 (W 92)	0 (W 90)	0 (B 88)	½ (W 100)	0 (B 94)	1½	46½	47½	1995
100	(Brazil) Renee Blandy T. Brambilla	1649	0 (B 66)	1 (-)	0 (W 64)	0 (B 35)	0 (W 59)	0 (B 85)	0 (W 89)	0 (W 94)	0 (B 90)	½ (B 99)	0 (W 96)	1½	44½	45½	1951
101	(Georgia (country)) Lela Javakhishvili	2402	0 (B 22)	0 (W 79)	1 (B 82)	0 (W 52)	0 (B 72)	0 (-)	0 (-)	0 (-)	0 (-)	0 (-)	0 (-)	1	43½	45½	1986
102	(India) Harika Dronavalli	2475	0 (W 41)	0 (-)	0 (-)	0 (-)	0 (-)	0 (-)	0 (-)	0 (-)	0 (-)	0 (-)	0 (-)	0	37½	38½	0
102	(Norway) Olga Dolzhikova	2107	0 (W 12)	0 (-)	0 (-)	0 (-)	0 (-)	0 (-)	0 (-)	0 (-)	0 (-)	0 (-)	0 (-)	0	37½	38½	0
