= Jan Klimkowski =

Polish chess grandmaster (born 2007)

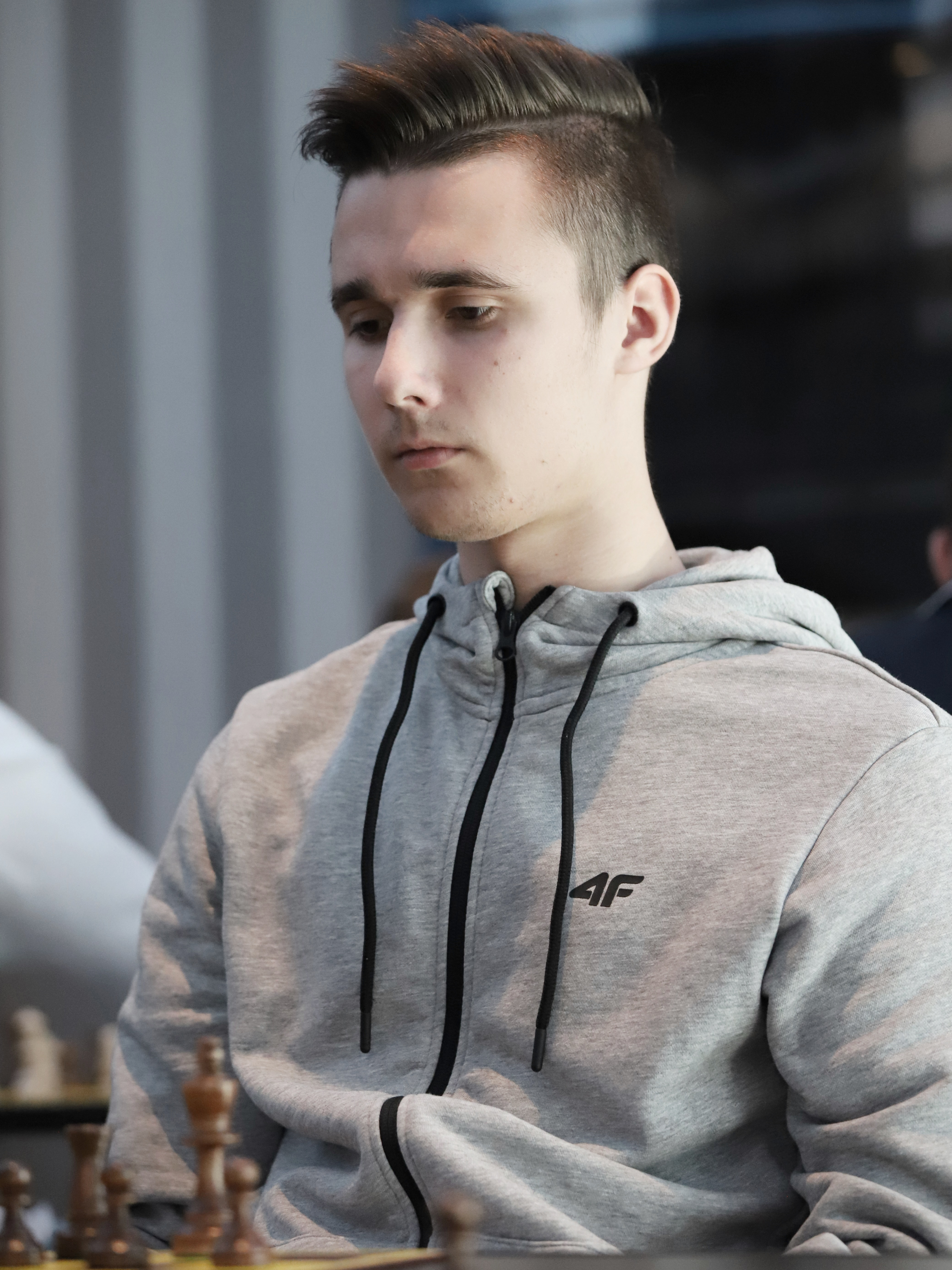
- Jan Klimkowski in 2022

Personal information
- Born: 30 January 2007 (age 19)

Chess career
- Country: Poland
- Title: Grandmaster (2025)
- FIDE rating: 2508 (July 2026)
- Peak rating: 2532 (March 2024)

Jan Klimkowski (born 30 January 2007) is a Polish chess grandmaster.

== Chess career ==
Jan Klimkowski started playing chess in the first grade with his trainer Kamil Szadkowski. After 4 months, he joined chess club UKS Smecz Konin. In 2015, after 10 months of training, he took part in the first Polish Rapid Chess Championship in U8 age group and took 53rd place, but in 2016 he won the same tournament in U10 age group. Since 2019, he has been training with Jacek Tomczak.

Jan Klimkowski has won numerous medals from youth championships. He has participated in individual and team championships of Europe and the world many times: 8th place at the European Youth Chess Championship in U10 age group (2017), 44th place at the World Youth Chess Championship in U12 age group (2018). In 2019, at the European Team Chess Championship in U12 age group as part of the Polish Chess Team, he scored 7 points out of 7, and in 2022 and 2023, at European Team Chess Championship in U18 age group, he received an individual gold medal.

Jan Klimkowski is bronze medalist of the 2024 Polish Team Chess Championship with chess club Hetman (Katowice).

Jan Klimkowski was participant of the World Rapid and Blitz Championships in 2021. and Polish Chess Cup in 2021. n 2022, at the international chess tournament in Kraków, he shared 3rd-9th places. In 2023, he won the round robin chess masters tournament "Voivode's Cup" in Legnica and shared 4th-9th places at the chess festival in Bydgoszcz, in 2024 he participated in the tournament Sharjah Masters.

In 2023, he was awarded the FIDE International Master (IM) title and received the FIDE Grandmaster (GM) title two years later.

In 2024 Jan Klimkowski was Gukesh Dommaraju second in World Chess Championship title match.
