= Boris Grachev =

Russian chess grandmaster (born 1986)

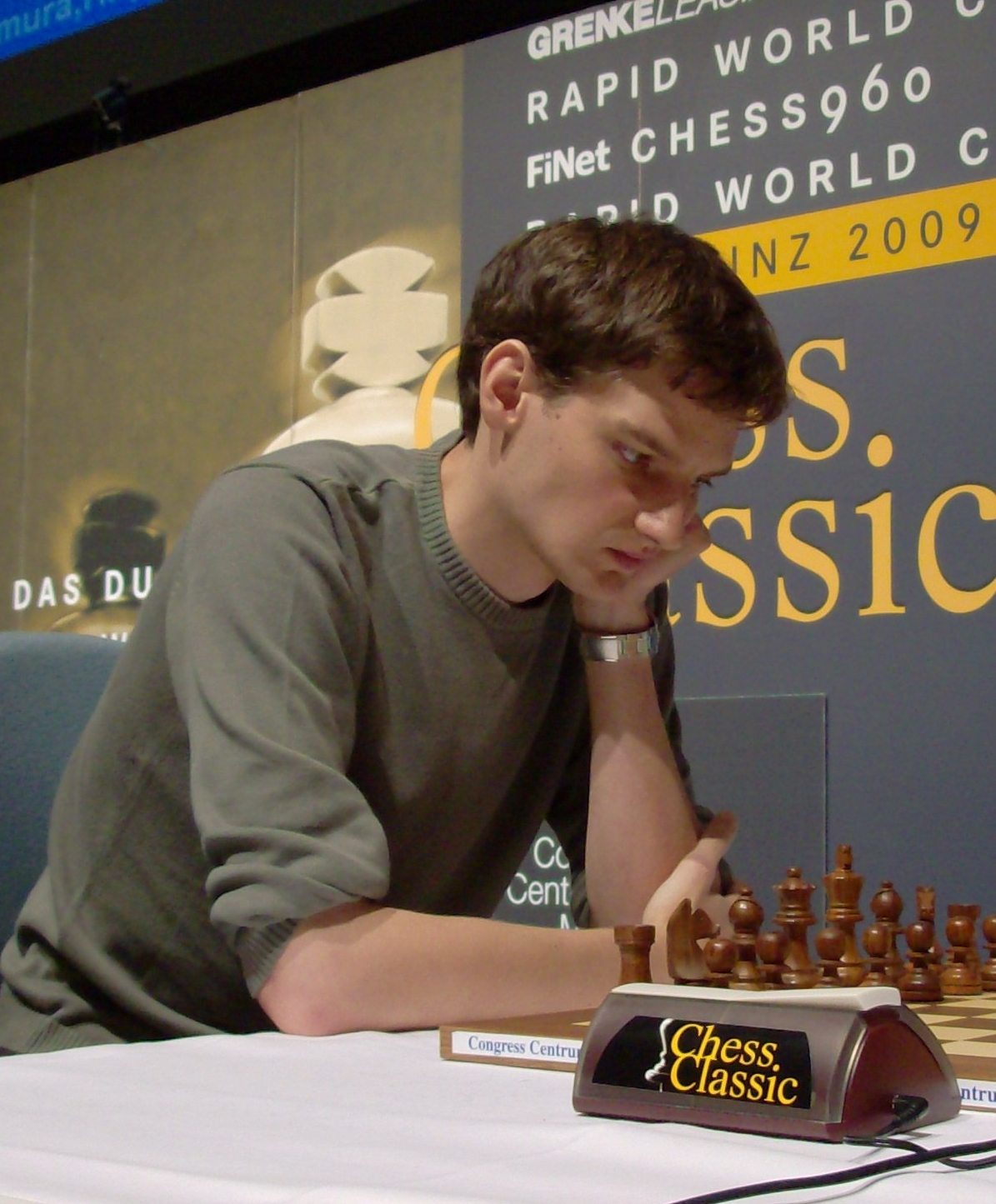

Personal information
- Born: Boris Pavlovich Grachev; 27 March 1986 (age 40) Moscow, Russian SFSR, Soviet Union

Chess career
- Country: Russia
- Title: Grandmaster (2007)
- FIDE rating: 2586 (July 2026)
- Peak rating: 2705 (March 2012)
- Peak ranking: No. 35 (March 2012)

Boris Pavlovich Grachev (Russian: Борис Павлович Грачёв; born 27 March 1986) is a Russian chess player. He was awarded the title Grandmaster by FIDE in 2007. Grachev competed in the FIDE World Cup in 2009, 2011, 2015, and 2017.

== Chess career ==
In 1995, Grachev won the Under 10 section of the World Youth Chess Festival in São Lourenço, Brazil. He won the Russian Junior Championship in 2006. In the same year he tied with Alexander Lastin for first place at the Moscow Open, finishing second on tiebreak score.

In March 2009, he finished in a tie for first place at the European Individual Chess Championship with a score of 8/11 points. In June of that year, Grachev won the first Lublin Grandmaster Tournament and in the following month, the Master Open tournament of the Biel Chess Festival. In 2010, he tied for 3rd–6th with Alexander Motylev, Zhou Jianchao and Nguyen Ngoc Truong Son in the Aeroflot Open. The next year, Grachev won the Young GM round-robin tournament at the Moscow Open festival.

In December 2011, he shared the first place with Igor Kurnosov at the 35th Zurich Christmas Open, and in January 2012, Grachev won the Basel Chess Festival. Thanks to this latter two achievements he crossed the 2700 Elo rating mark in the March 2012 FIDE rating list.

In January 2013, Grachev won again in Basel, edging out on tiebreak Levente Vajda, Robin van Kampen and Andrei Istrățescu. In 2014, he shared 4th-5th places in the Russian Championship Higher League and as a result qualified to play in the Superfinal of the Russian Chess Championship. In this event he scored 4/9 points.

In September 2016, Grachev won both the Moscow Blitz Championship (on tiebreak from Alexander Morozevich) and the Moscow Rapid Championship. Two months later, he played for team SHSM Legacy Square Moscow in the European Chess Club Cup in Novi Sad. His team finished third.

In February 2021, Grachev won the Mark Dvoretsky Memorial in Moscow (on tiebreak from Ernesto Inarkiev).

== Notable games ==
- Loek van Wely vs Boris Grachev, Russian Team Championship 2008, Queen's Gambit Declined (D30), 0–1
- Boris Grachev vs Rafael Vaganian, Aeroflot Open 2009, Queen's Gambit Declined: Harrwitz Attack (D37), 1–0
