= Zbigniew Księski =

Polish chess player (1954–2018)

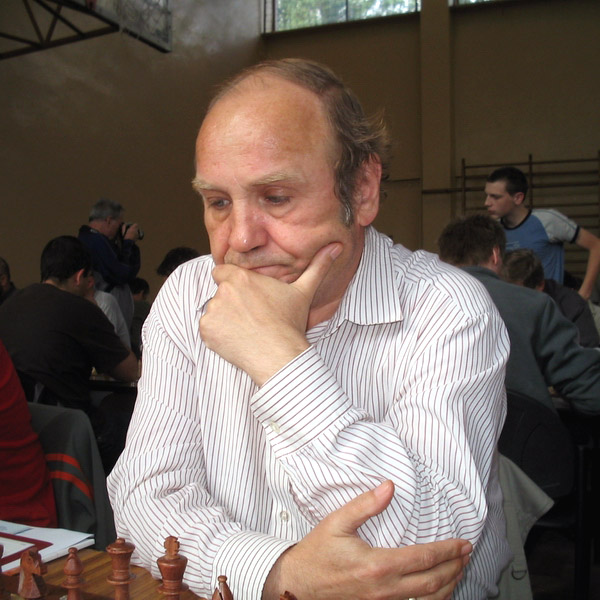
- Zbigniew Księski in 2006

Personal information
- Born: 1 January 1954 Żary, Poland
- Died: 26 May 2018 (aged 64) Lublin, Poland

Chess career
- Country: Poland
- Title: International Master (1985)
- Peak rating: 2441 (January 1999)

Zbigniew Księski (1 January 1954 – 26 May 2018) was a Polish chess International Master (1985).

== Chess career ==
In 1974, in Grudziądz, Zbigniew Księski won the Polish Junior Chess Championship in U20 age group. In the same year, he also took second place in the international junior chess tournament in Ploiești. In Polish Chess Championships he made his debut in 1975. Until 1984, Zbigniew Księski appeared in Polish Chess Championship final tournaments eight times, achieving the best results in the years 1980 (Łódź, 5th place), 1982 (Zielona Góra, 5th place) and 1983 (Piotrków Trybunalski, 4th place). Twice (Piotrków Trybunalski 1976, Bydgoszcz 1987) Zbigniew Księski won silver medals in Polish Blitz Chess Championships. He also won medals in Polish Team Chess Championship with chess club FKS Avia Świdnik: gold (1982), 2 silver (1979, 1980) and bronze (1981).

Zbigniew Księski has competed in international and national chess tournaments many times, achieving successes, e.g. in Kraków (1980, tournament open, shared 2nd place), Hradec Králové (1981, open, ranked 1st place), Budapest (1983, ranked 4th place), Mielno (1983, open, shared 1st place), Ulaanbaatar (1983, ranked 3rd place), Călimănești (1985, shared 2nd place), Białystok (1985, ranked 2nd place) and Rzeszów (1986, ranked 2nd place). In the following years, good results were recorded, e.g. in Stuttgart (2001, open, shared 2nd place), Bad Königshofen (2003, ranked 3rd place), Crailsheim (2004, open' , shared 2nd place), Görlitz (2004, open, shared 1st place), Jena (2004, open, shared 2nd place), Munich (2005, open, shared 3rd place), Hamburg (2005, ranked 2nd place) and Chemnitz (2006, open, shared 1st place).

Zbigniew Księski achieved the highest rating in his career on January 1, 1999, with a score of 2441 points, he was ranked 13th among Polish chess players.

Zbigniew Księski buried at the Municipal Cemetery in Lublin.

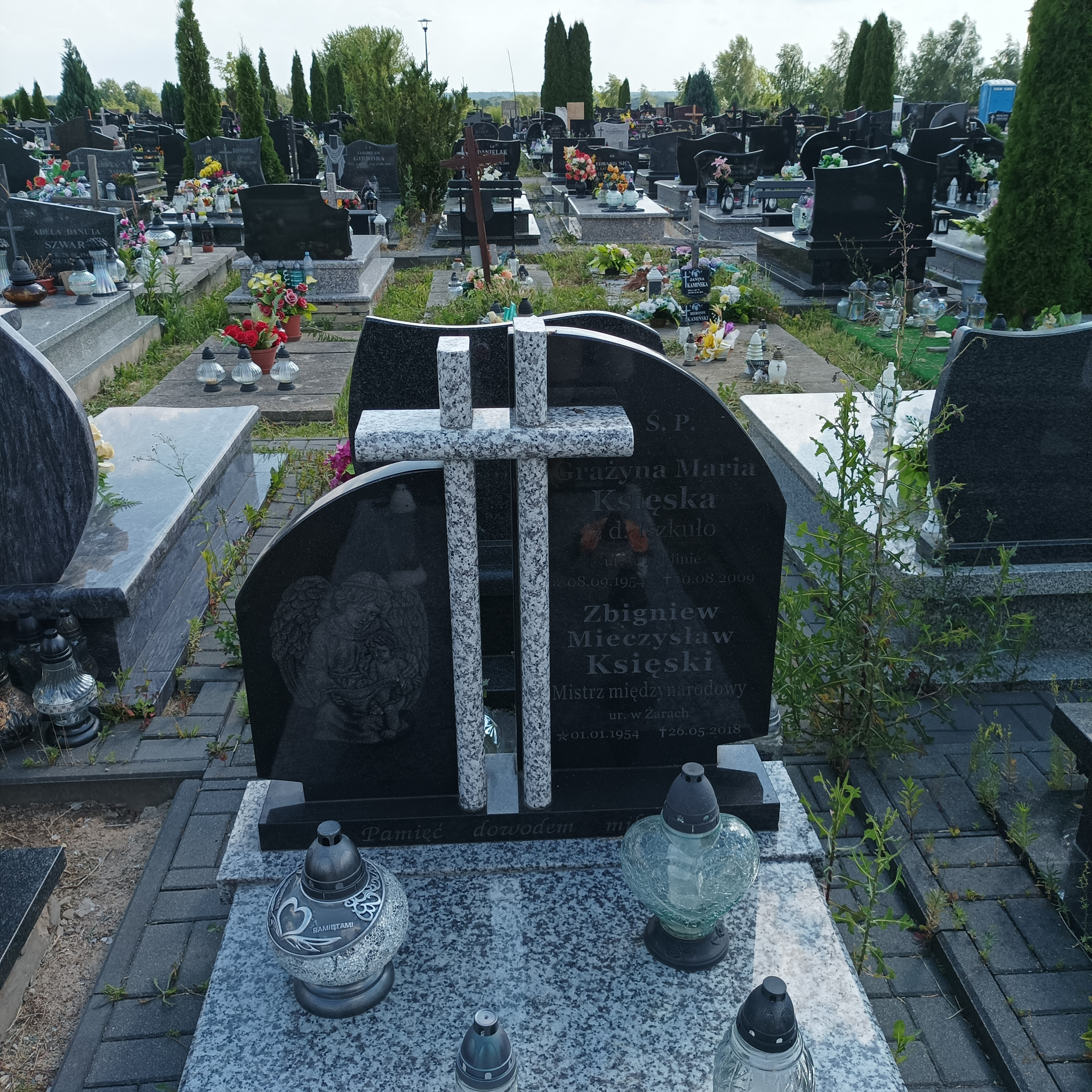
Zbigniew Księski's grave at the Municipal Cemetery in Lublin
