= Marcin Dziuba =

Polish chess player

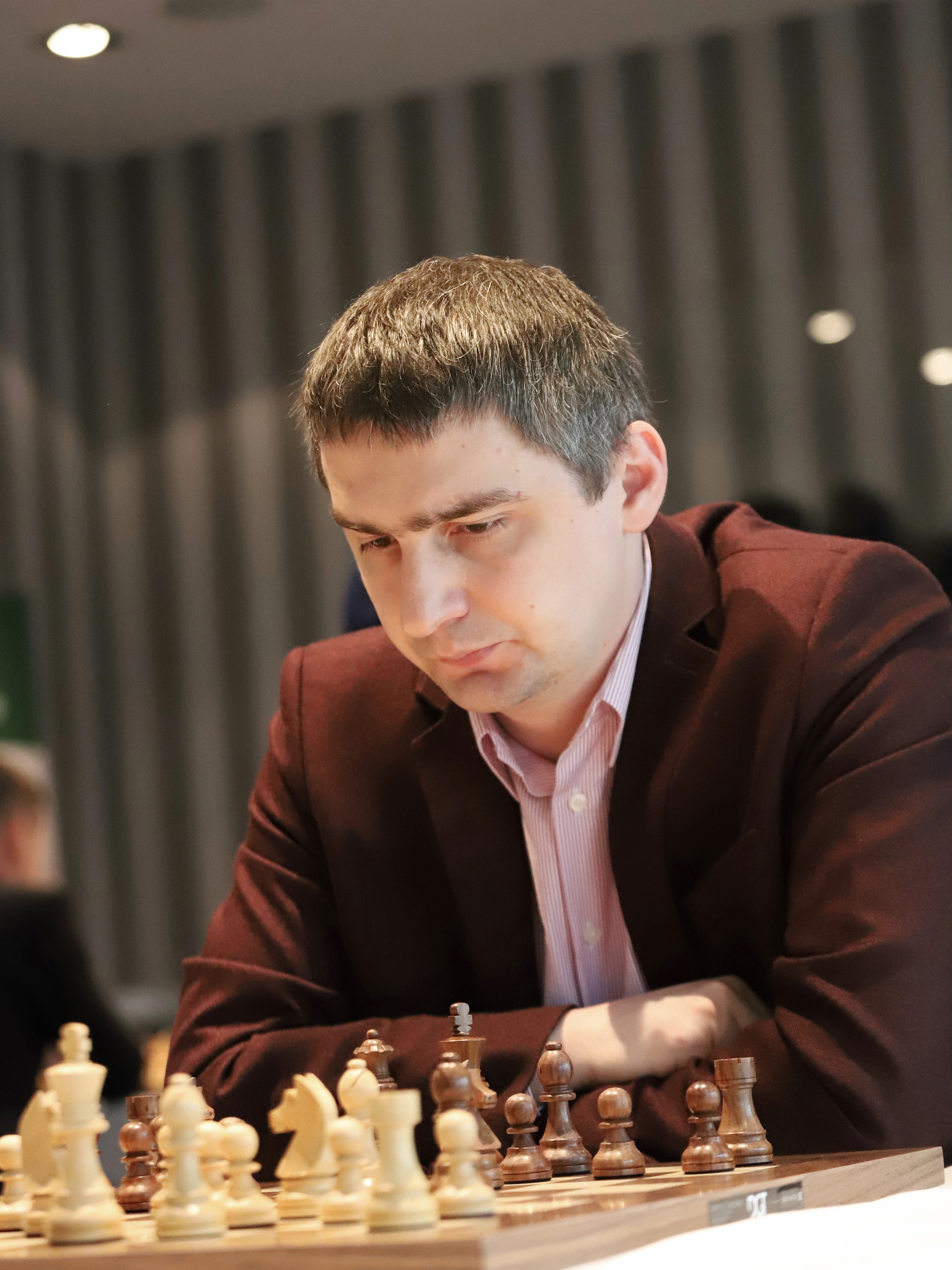
- Dziuba in 2021

Personal information
- Born: 17 July 1983 (age 42) Zamość, Poland

Chess career
- Country: Poland
- Title: Grandmaster (2007)
- FIDE rating: 2503 (July 2026)
- Peak rating: 2610 (April 2013)

Marcin Dziuba (born 17 July 1983) is a Polish chess player holding the title of grandmaster. In 2000, he came 4th at the European U18 Chess Championship played in Chalkidiki and in 2001, he came 5th at the European U20 Championship in Patras. In 2008, he finished 3rd-4th in the Polish chess championship played in Lublin. In 2009, he finished 6th at the second grandmaster tournament in Lublin.
