= Bartosz Soćko =

Polish chess grandmaster (born 1978)

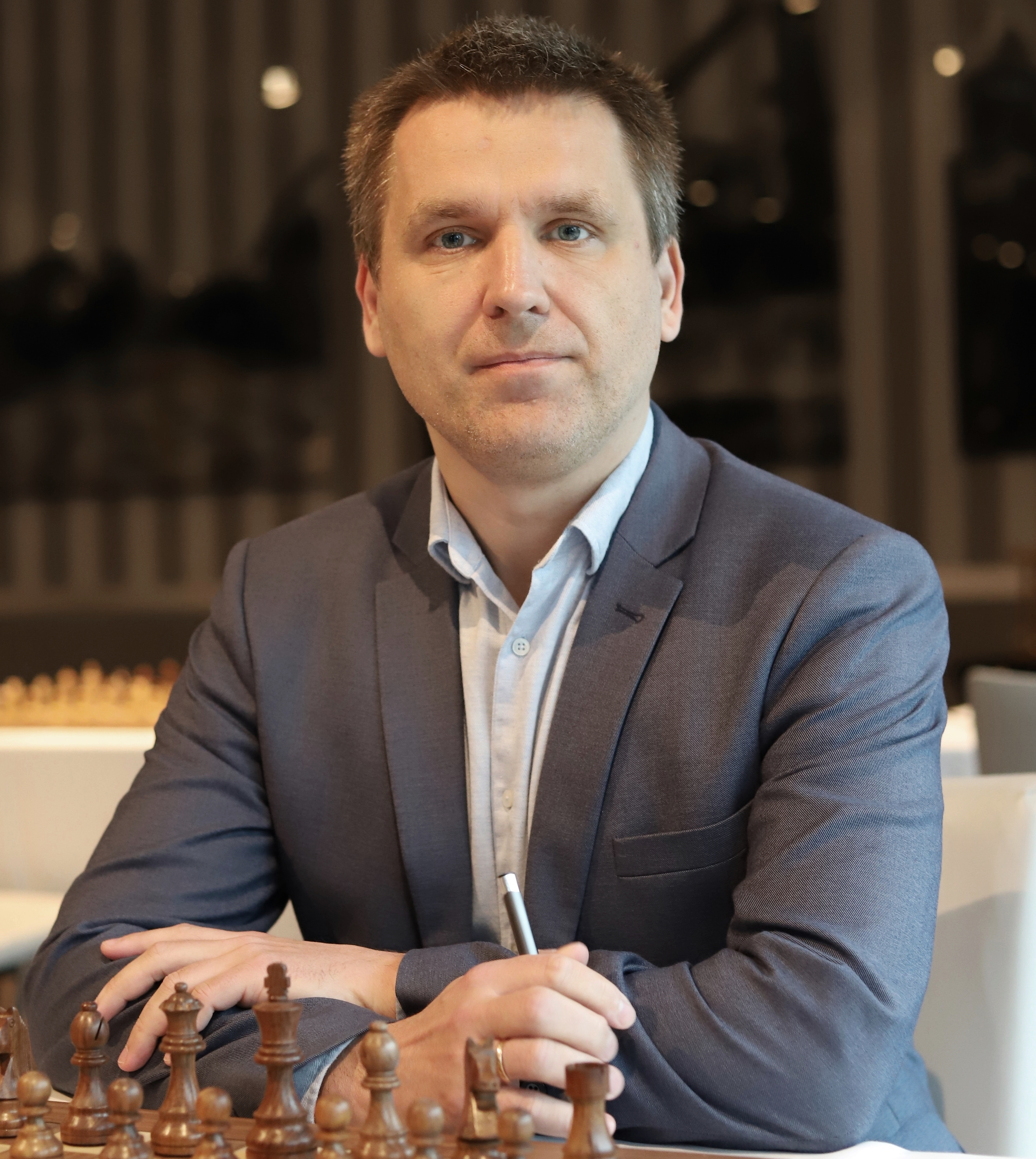
- Soćko in 2021

Personal information
- Born: 10 November 1978 (age 47) Piaseczno, Poland
- Spouse: Monika Bobrowska

Chess career
- Country: Poland
- Title: Grandmaster (1999)
- FIDE rating: 2554 (July 2026)
- Peak rating: 2663 (February 2014)
- Peak ranking: No. 49 (July 2007)

Bartosz Soćko (born 10 November 1978) is a Polish International Grandmaster chess player. In 2008, 2013, and 2023 he was national champion of Poland.

== Chess career ==
Soćko played for Poland at six Chess Olympiads (2000, 2002, 2004, 2006, 2008, and 2010) and at six European Team Chess Championships (1999, 2001, 2003, 2005, 2007 and 2009). He took part in the Chess World Cup 2011, where he was eliminated in the first round by Victor Bologan.

In 2013, he won the Riga Technical University Open.

In 2021, he won his game with White against the world champion Magnus Carlsen in the FIDE world blitz championships.

In 2023, he won Polish Chess Championship. In May 2024, in Rzeszów he came 5th in the Polish Chess Championship.

His wife is GM Monika Soćko.
