= Daniel Sadzikowski =

Polish chess grandmaster (born 1994)

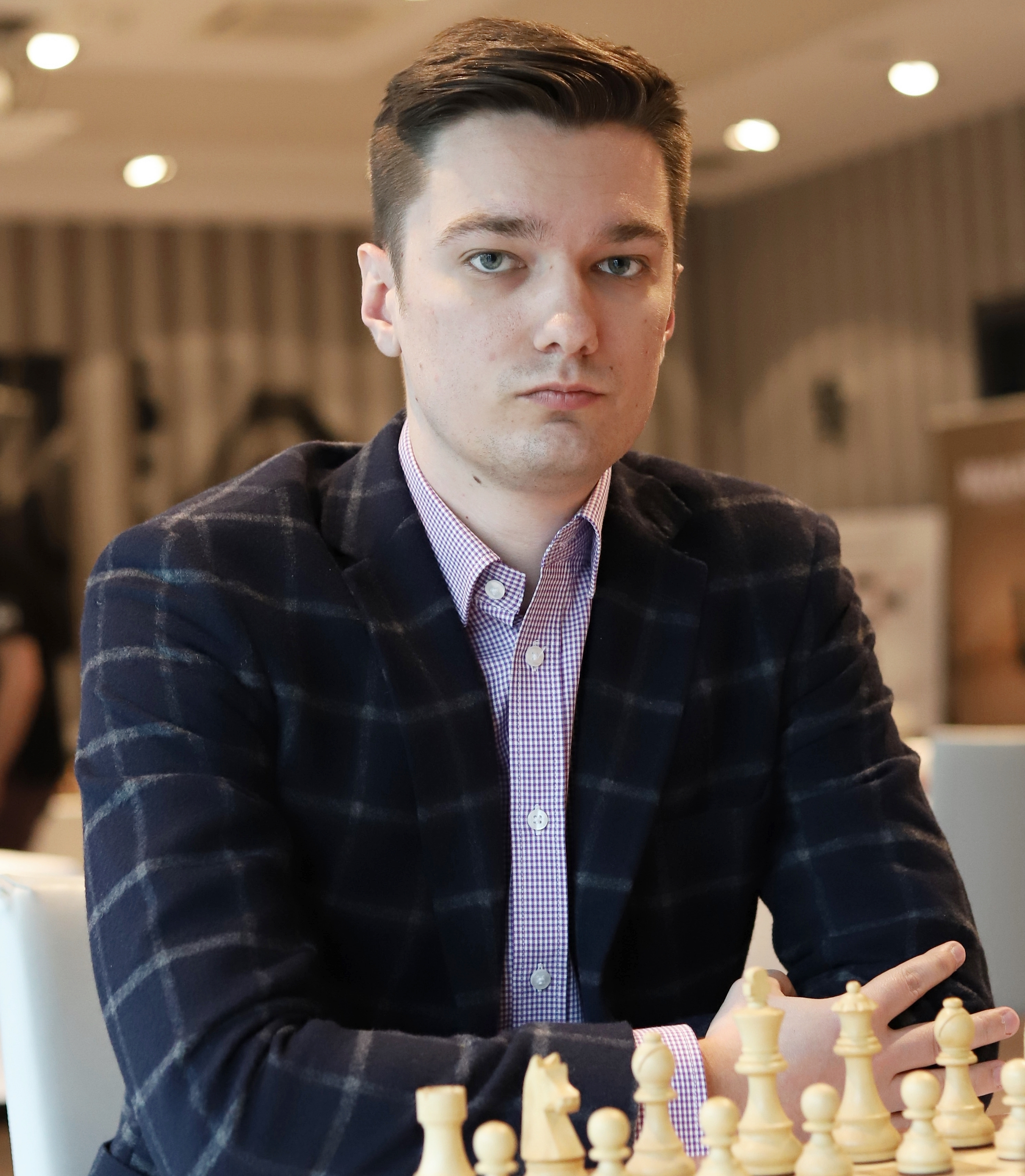
- Daniel Sadzikowski in 2021

Personal information
- Born: 20 January 1994 (age 32) Chrzanów, Poland

Chess career
- Country: Poland
- Title: Grandmaster (2017)
- FIDE rating: 2478 (July 2026)
- Peak rating: 2594 (August 2017)

Daniel Sadzikowski (born 20 January 1994) is a Polish chess Grandmaster (GM) (2017).

== Biography ==
In 2001, in the village of Załęcze Wielkie, Daniel Sadzikowski won the title of Polish Chess Championship of Preschoolers. In the following years, he competed many times in the finals of the Polish Youth Chess Championships in various age groups, winning two medals: gold (Kołobrzeg 2004) and bronze (Wisła 2003), both in the U10 age group. In 2007, he took third place in the open chess championships Podhale held in Rabka-Zdrój. In 2009, he single-handedly won the open international chess tournament in Mariánské Lázně, while in Varna he won the silver medal in the European School Chess Teams Championship, representing the School Complex No. 1 in Chrzanów. In 2010, he shared 2nd place in the Round-robin tournament in Mariánské Lázně, shared 4th place in the open chess tournament in Varna and achieved the greatest success of his career so far, winning in Porto Carras silver medal in World Youth Chess Championship in U16 age group. In 2011, he won in Iași the title of European Boys' U18 Team Chess Champion, repeating this success in 2012 in Pardubice. In 2014, he shared the 1st place in Góra Świętej Anny and single-handedly won the International Grandmaster Tournament of the Club Polonia Wrocław in Wrocław.

Daniel Sadzikowski has participated many times in the Polish Chess Championships, in which he won a silver medal in 2020.

In 2012, Daniel Sadzikowski was awarded the FIDE International Master (IM) title and received the FIDE Grandmaster (WM) title five years later. He achieved the highest rating in his career so far on August 1, 2017, with a score of 2594 points, he was ranked 11th among Polish chess players.
