= Grzegorz Gajewski =

Polish chess grandmaster (born 1985)

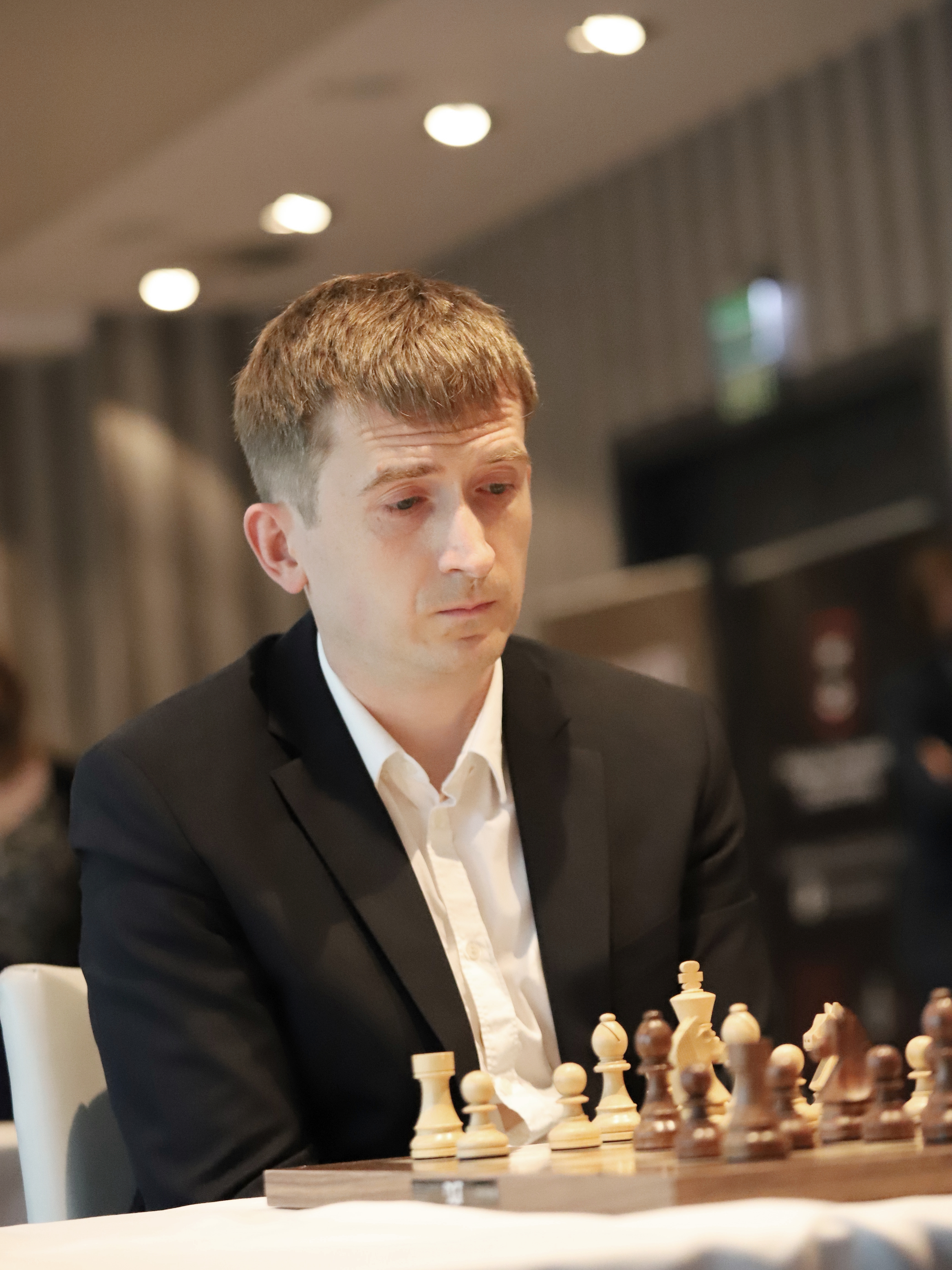
- Gajewski during the Polish Chess Championship in 2021

Personal information
- Born: 19 July 1985 (age 40) Skierniewice, Poland
- Spouse: Joanna Majdan

Chess career
- Country: Poland
- Title: Grandmaster (2006)
- FIDE rating: 2547 (July 2026)
- Peak rating: 2659 (July 2014)
- Peak ranking: No. 86 (July 2014)

Grzegorz Gajewski (born 19 July 1985) is a Polish chess player and one-time Polish Chess Champion (2015). He was awarded the title of Grandmaster by FIDE in 2006.

== Chess career ==
In 2011, Gajewski won the Cappelle-la-Grande Open. In 2012 he won the 14th Open International de Sants, Hostafrancs i La Bordeta in Barcelona edging out Aleksandr Rakhmanov, Emilio Cordova, Kevin Spraggett and Samuel Shankland on tiebreak score, after all players scored 8 points from 10 games. Gajewski won the Polish Chess Championship in 2015.

Gajewski played for the Polish team in the Chess Olympiads of 2008 in Dresden, where he played on the fourth board scoring 6½ points from 10 games, and 2014 in Tromsø. He also took part in the European Team Chess Championship in 2007, 2009, 2013 and 2015; Gajewski won the individual silver medal on board three in 2007.

He was a second to Viswanathan Anand in the World Chess Championship 2014, held in Sochi, Russia, and has worked as his second during several events since then. A strong opening theoretician, Gajewski is probably most known in the chess world by the gambit move 10...d5!? in the Ruy Lopez opening which he introduced in July 2007 during a tournament in Pardubice.

Since the pandemic, he has been working with some of India's sharpest chess players at Westbridge Anand Chess Academy (WACA). Since 2023, he has been working as Gukesh Dommaraju's second, assisting him in winning the 2024 Candidates Tournament, where Gukesh became the youngest challenger in the history of the World Chess Championship. He was also Gukesh's main trainer when he won the 2024 FIDE World Chess Championship against Ding Liren.
