= Marcin Sieciechowicz =

Polish chess player (born 1992)

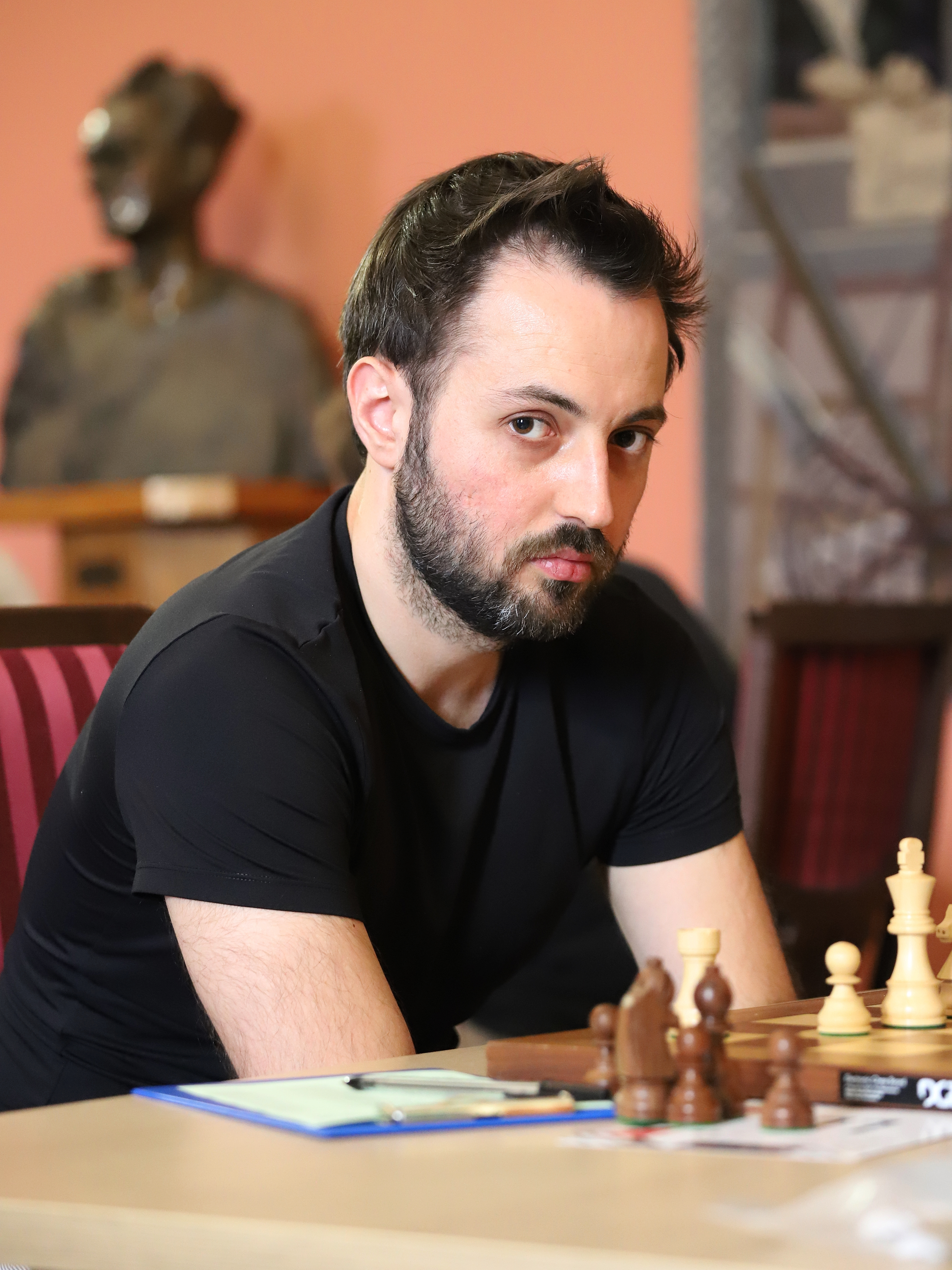
- Marcin Sieciechowicz in 2022

Personal information
- Born: 27 March 1992 (age 34) Poznań, Poland

Chess career
- Country: Poland
- Title: International Master (2010)
- Peak rating: 2462 (June 2013)

Marcin Sieciechowicz (born 27 March 1992) is a Polish chess International Master (2010).

== Chess career ==
Marcin Sieciechowicz competed in the finals of Polish Youth Chess Championship in various age groups, winning 4 medals: gold (Karpacz 2010 - in U18 age group), 2 silver (Łeba 2007 and Łeba 2008 – both in U16 age groups) and bronze (Kołobrzeg 2004 – in U12 age group). He was also a two-time representative of Poland at the European Youth Chess Championship in U16 age group (Šibenik 2007 and Herceg Novi 2008). In 2010, in Pardubice he with Poland team won European U18 Team Chess Championship.

In 2009, Marcin Sieciechowicz shared 2nd place (behind Vladimir Malaniuk, together with Vidmantas Mališauskas) in the Swiss-system tournament in Koszalin. He fulfilled the norms for the title of International Master in 2009 (in Cappelle-la-Grande Open and during Polish Team Chess Championship in Lublin ) and 2010 (in Mariánské Lázně, ranked in 4th place in Grandmaster's round-robin tournament, after Dominik Orzech, Richard Rapport, Pavel Šimáček, together with Henrik Danielsen). At the turn of 2010 and 2011, he shared the 1st place (among others together with Kamil Dragun) in the cyclical tournament Cracovia in Kraków. In 2011, Marcin Sieciechowicz won in Kowalewo Pomorskie, shared 1st place in Legnica and shared the 2nd place in Akiba Rubinstein memorial in Polanica-Zdrój (after Aleksander Hnydiuk, together with Marcin Tazbir). In 2012, he won the tournament Konik Morski Rewal in Rewal.

Marcin Sieciechowicz three times participated in Polish Chess Championships (2012, 2014–2015). He five times participated in Polish Team Chess Championship (2009–2010, 2013, 2016–2017) and won two individual medals with chess clubs BKS Prokonex Brzeg and KSz Miedź Legnica: silver (2013) and bronze (2009). In 2018, in Szczawno-Zdrój Marcin Sieciechowicz won Polish Blitz Chess Championship. In 2022, in Trzcianka he won Polish Rapid Chess Championship.

Marcin Sieciechowicz achieved the highest rating in his career so far on June 1, 2013, with a score of 2462 points, he was then ranked 42nd among Polish chess players.
