= Marcin Szeląg =

Polish chess player

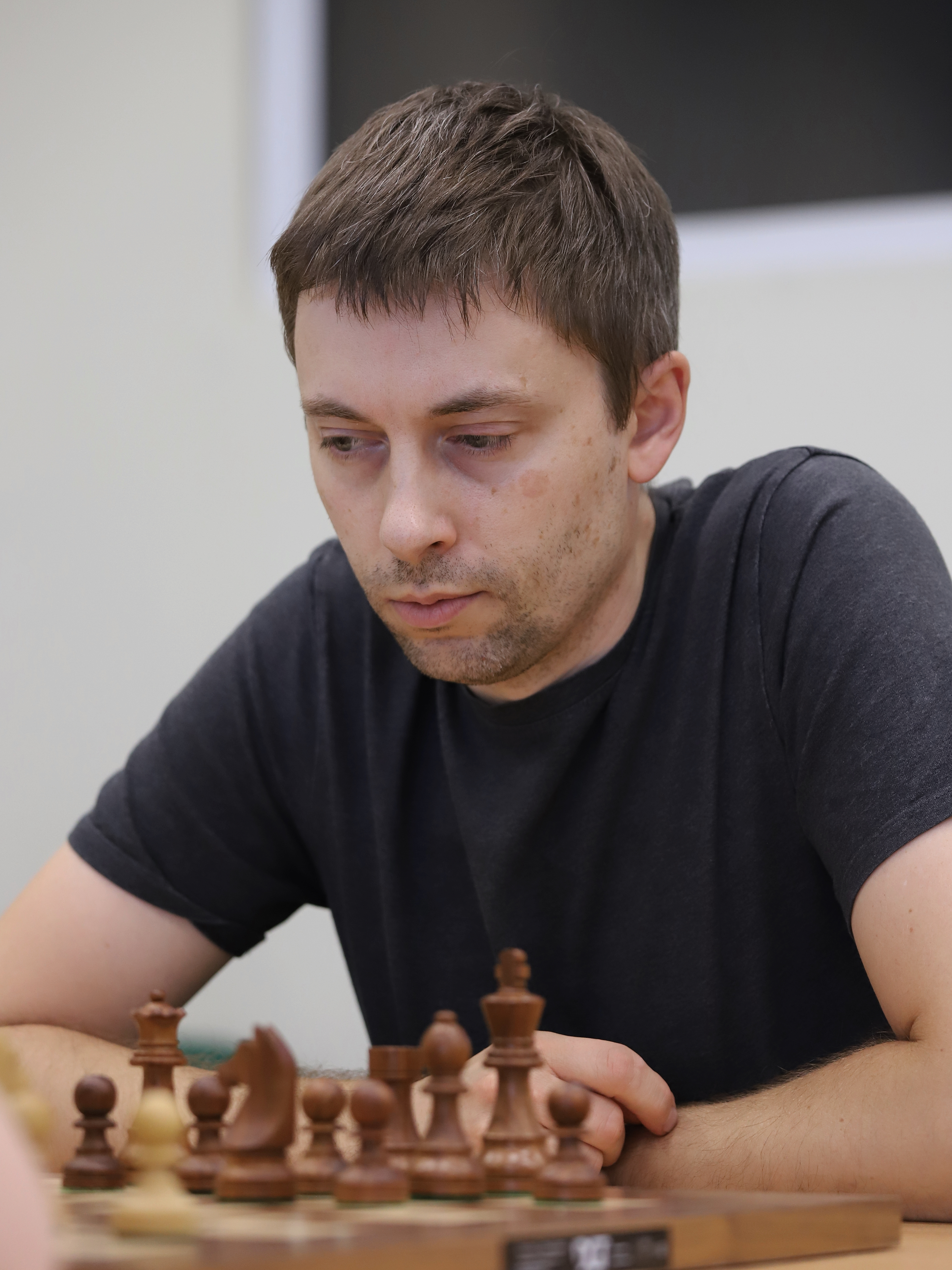
- Marcin Szeląg in 2022

Personal information
- Born: 7 July 1980 (age 46) Bydgoszcz, Poland

Chess career
- Country: Poland
- Title: International Master (2000)
- Peak rating: 2501 (May 2013)

Marcin Szeląg (born 7 July 1980) is a Polish chess International Master (2000). He lives in Poland.

== Chess career ==
Marcin Szeląg has played many times in the finals of the Polish Youth Chess Championships, European Youth Chess Championships and World Youth Chess Championships in various age groups. He won the Polish Youth Chess champion title twice (in 1995 - U14 age group and 1997 - U16 age group). In 1997, he also achieved his greatest success on the international youth chess arena, taking 5th place at the World Youth Chess Championship in U16 age group.

In 2001, Marcin Szeląg won with chess club KS "Pocztowiec" (Poznań) a bronze medal at the Polish Team Chess Championship in Głogów. In 2003, he won the Swiss-system tournament in Poznań and shared the 1st place in Zug. In 2004, he took first place in the Open chess tournament in Kożuchów and shared 3rd place (behind Piotr Bobras, together with Radosław Wojtaszek) in the next tournament in Poznań. In 2005, he shared the 2nd place (after Radosław Wojtaszek, together with Vladimir Malaniuk and Paweł Czarnota) in the Cracovia 2004/05 festival in Kraków, made his debut in Poznań in the final of the Polish Chess Championship and taking 14th place, and won the Open chess tournament in Poznań. In 2006, he achieved great success, sharing the 2nd place (after Alexander Moiseenko, together with, among others, Vugar Gashimov, Sergei Azarov, Vladimir Burmakin and Krishnan Sasikiran) in the Cappelle-la-Grande Open. He also shared 1st place in the next international chess tournament held in Poznań. In 2007, he shared the 2nd place (after Artur Jakubiec, together with, among others, Vadim Shishkin) in Kraków and once again shared the 1st place in Poznań, while in 2010 he won in Poznań.

In 2016, Marcin Szeląg won Akiba Rubinstein Memorial in Polanica-Zdrój.

Marcin Szeląg achieved the highest rating in his career so far on May 1, 2013, with a score of 2,501 points, he was then 30th among Polish chess players.

== Professional life ==
Marcin Szeląg is a researcher at the Institute of Computer Science at Poznań University of Technology, holds the degree of doctor engineer. He was the winner of the PSSI competition for the best doctoral thesis in Artificial Intelligence for his work Application of the Dominance-based Rough Set Approach to Ranking and Similarity-based Classification Problems.
