= Tomasz Warakomski =

Polish chess grandmaster (born 1989)

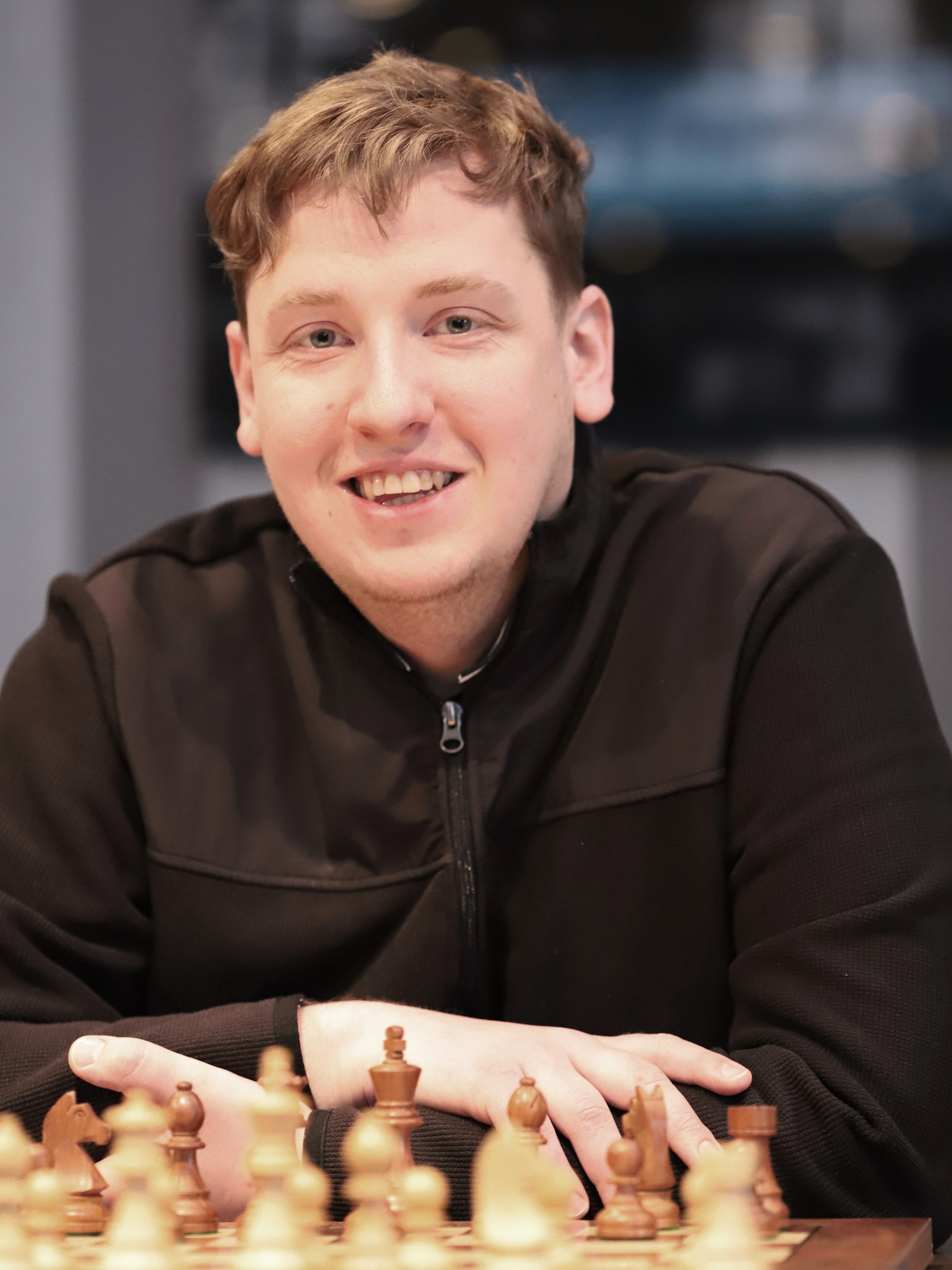
- Tomasz Warakomski in 2022

Personal information
- Born: 22 June 1989 (age 37) Suwałki, Poland

Chess career
- Country: Poland
- Title: Grandmaster (2017)
- FIDE rating: 2541 (July 2026)
- Peak rating: 2558 (May 2026)

Tomasz Warakomski (born 22 June 1989) is a Polish chess Grandmaster (GM) (2017).

== Biography ==
Tomasz Warakomski is a three-time Polish Junior Chess Championship winner in various age groups: U12 (Kołobrzeg, 2001), U14 (Brody, 2003) and U18 (Łeba, 2007). Two times (in 2005 and 2006) appeared in the finals of the Polish Chess Championships, taking 13th place in both cases.

In 2005, Tomasz Warakomski represented Poland at the World Youth Chess Championship in Belfort, taking 4th place in the U16 age group. He also took part in the European Youth Chess Championship in Herceg Novi, where he took the 6th place in the same age category. In 2006, he took 2nd place (behind Aloyzas Kveinys) in the open tournament in Koszalin and recorded a very successful performance at Polish Team Chess Championship in Ustroń, achieving the best result on the third board. In 2007, in Mielno, Tomasz Warakomski won the Polish Blitz Chess Championship. In 2009, he shared 2nd place (behind Wojciech Moranda) in the open tournament Akiba Rubinstein Memorial. At the turn of 2009 and 2010, Tomasz Warakomski shared the 1st place (together with Oleksandr Zubov and Paweł Czarnota) in the Cracovia tournament in Kraków. In 2011, in the colors of the club "KSz Polonia Warszawa" he won the title of Polish Team Chess Champion. In 2013, Tomasz Warakomski won the OPEN chess tournament in Kowalewo Pomorskie. In 2015, he won the gold medal of the Polish academic championship in Zabrze. In 2015, Tomasz Warakomski won a round-robin tournament in Polanica-Zdrój. In 2017, he won the OPEN tournaments in Czeskie Budziejowice and Polanica-Zdrój.

Tomasz Warakomski achieved the highest ranking in his career so far on October 1, 2017, with a score of 2537 points, he was then ranked 21st among Polish chess players.

== Private life ==
Tomasz Warakomski's younger sister, Anna, is also a well-known chess player and holds the title of Women Grandmaster (WGM).

On August 11–18, 2017, the 1st Memorial of Irena Warakomska, Tomasz Warakomski's mother, was held, which was organized by the Warakomski family.
