= Aleksander Hnydiuk =

Polish chess player (born 1978)

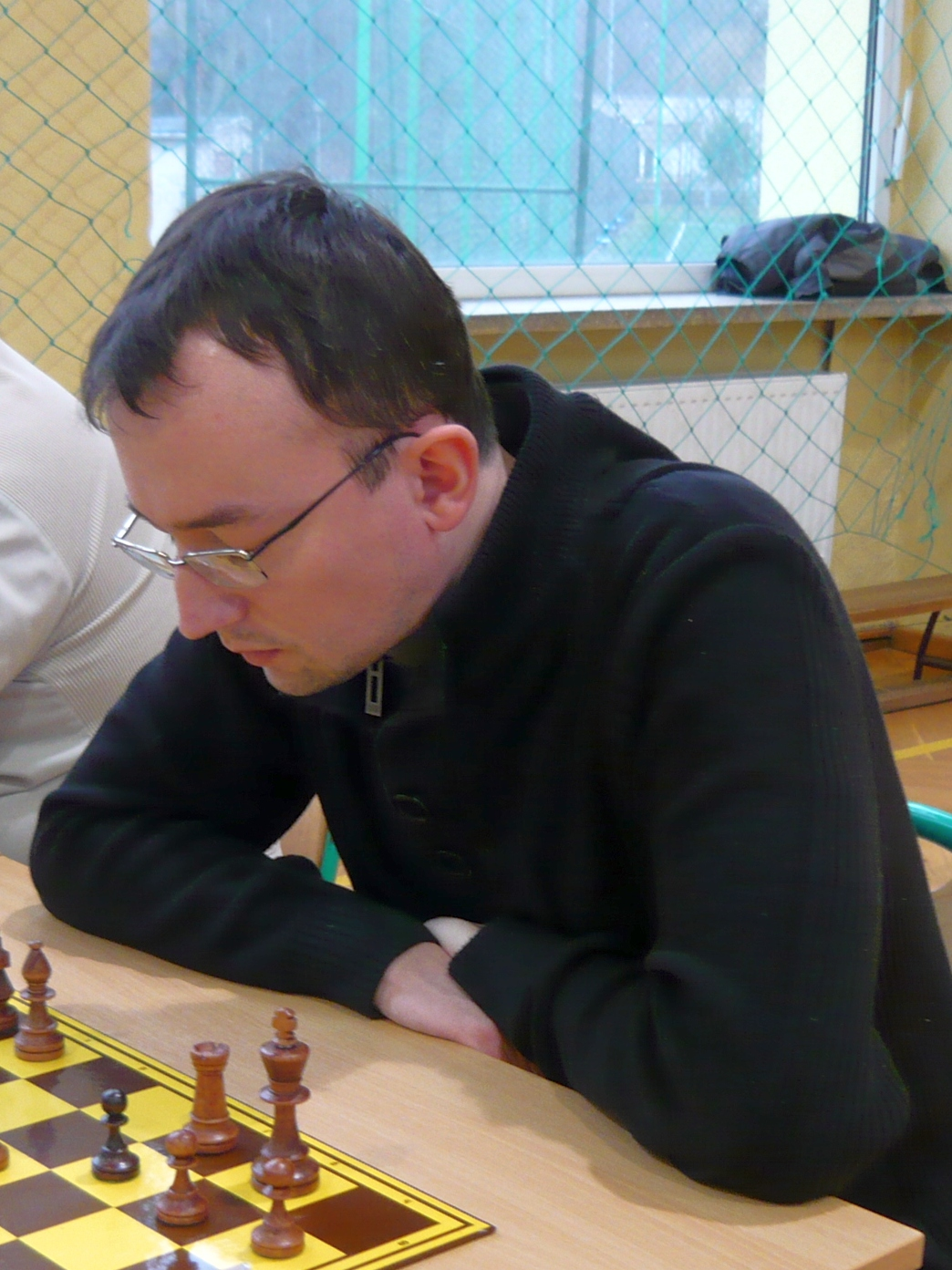
- Aleksander Hnydiuk in 2014

Personal information
- Born: 11 December 1978 (age 47) Kędzierzyn-Koźle, Poland

Chess career
- Country: Poland
- Title: International Master (2009)
- Peak rating: 2448 (September 2010)

Aleksander Hnydiuk (born 11 December 1978) is a Polish chess International Master (2009).

== Chess career ==
Hnydiuk appeared several times in the finals of the Polish Youth Chess Championships, winning silver medals twice, in 1996 (in Chorzów, in the age group U18) and 1997 (in Babimost, in the age group U20). In 1996, in Rimavská Sobota he represented Poland at the European Youth Chess Championship in the age group U18 and ranked in 18th place. In 1997, he participated in the European Youth Chess Championship for the second time and taking 24th place in Tallinn (in the age group U20). In 1998 (in Książ) and 2000 (in Płock) Hnydiuk played twice in the individual finals of the Polish Chess Championship, in both cases taking 14th place. In 1996, he achieved the best individual result on the 4th board during the 2nd Polish Team Chess Championship in Nadole.

In 2001, during the Swiss-system tournament, Akiba Rubinstein Memorial won his first norm for the title of International Master. In 2005, he shared the 2nd place (together with Andrei Maksimenko) in the Swiss-system tournament in Turawa and achieved the best individual result on the 1st board of the 2nd Polish Team Chess Championship in Wysowa-Zdrój, in 2006 he shared the 3rd place (after Vladimir Malaniuk, together with Vadim Shishkin) in Memorial of Tadeusz Gniot in Police, and in 2007 he shared the 2nd place in Pokrzywna. In the same year, he fulfilled two more norms for the title of International Master, during the Emanuel Lasker memorial in Barlinek and at the Polish Team Chess Championship (Ekstraklasa) in Ustroń. He achieved the fourth International Master norm in 2008 in the Ekstraklasa in Karpacz. In 2011, he won the main tournament of the Akiba Rubinstein Memorial in Polanica-Zdrój, fulfilling the first standard for the title of Grandmaster.

In the 9th International Chess Tournament on Mount Św. Anny he fulfilled the norm for Grandmaster for the second time.

Hnydiuk achieved the highest rating in his career so far on 1 September 2010, with a score of 2448 points, he was then 44th among Polish chess players.
