= Warakomski =

Warakomski is a Polish surname. Notable people with the surname include:

- Shay Warakomski (born 1975), U.S. Space Force officer
- Tomasz Warakomski (born 1989), Polish chess grandmaster
