= Rubinstein Memorial =

Polish international chess tournament

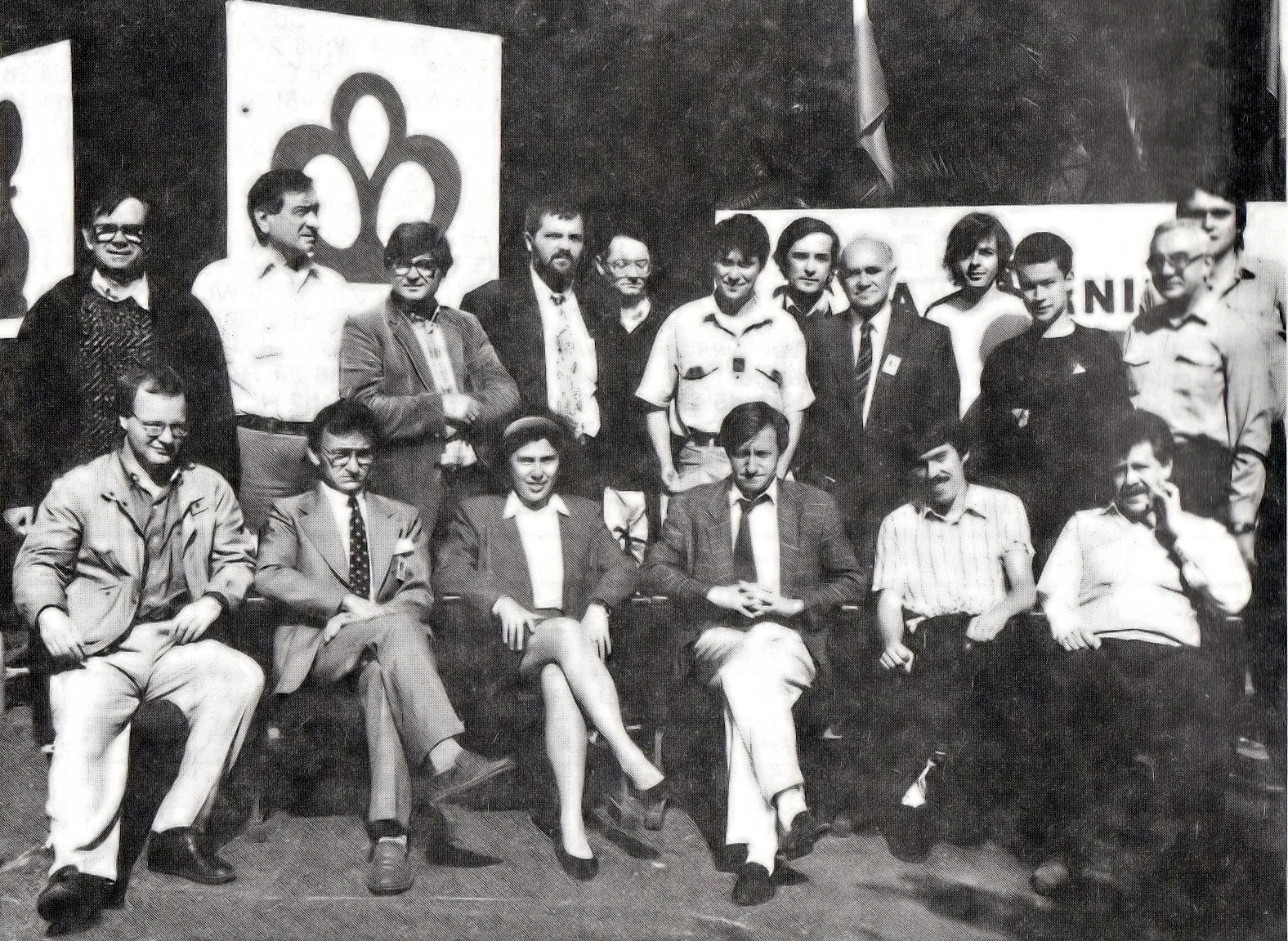
Participants of the 1991 tournament

The Rubinstein Memorial is an annual chess tournament held in Polanica-Zdrój, Poland in honour of the chess legend Akiba Rubinstein. Rubinstein died in 1961 and the tournament had its first edition in 1963.

The tournament built a strong reputation all the way until the 1990s (peaking in 1998, when Anatoly Karpov, Boris Gelfand and Alexei Shirov among others participated), before declining throughout the 2000s. The 60th anniversary (2024) was marked by a significantly stronger field compared to previous years, featuring top-tier players including Jan-Krzysztof Duda, Vincent Keymer, and Radoslaw Wojtaszek.

The tournament usually consists of several tournaments in different rating or age groups. The main tournament is usually a closed round-robin tournament, while the other tournaments are open Swiss system tournaments.

== Winners ==
#	Year	Winner	#RR
1	1963	Nikola Padevsky (Bulgaria)	16
2	1964	Andrzej Filipowicz (Poland); Bruno Parma (Yugoslavia)	16
3	1965	Evgeni Vasiukov (USSR); Péter Dely (Hungary)	14
4	1966	Vasily Smyslov (USSR)	15
5	1967	Semyon Furman (USSR)	16
6	1968	Vasily Smyslov (USSR)	16
7	1969	Laszlo Barczay (Hungary)	16
8	1970	Jan Smejkal (Czechoslovakia)	16
9	1971	Helmut Pfleger (Germany)	16
10	1972	Jan Smejkal (Czechoslovakia)	16
11	1973	Włodzimierz Schmidt (Poland)	14
12	1974	Vladimir Karasev (USSR)	16
13	1975	Yuri Averbakh (USSR)	16
14	1976	Gennadi Timoshchenko (USSR)	15
15	1977	Vlastimil Hort (Czechoslovakia)	18
16	1978	Mark Tseitlin (USSR)	15
17	1979	Yuri Razuvayev (USSR)	16
18	1980	Oleg Romanishin (USSR)	14
19	1981	Włodzimierz Schmidt (Poland)	14
20	1982	Lothar Vogt (East Germany)	15
21	1983	Viacheslav Dydyshko (USSR)	15
22	1984	Gennadi Zaichik (USSR)	16
23	1985	Konstantin Lerner (USSR)	16
24	1986	Péter Lukács (Hungary)	13
25	1987	Uwe Bönsch (East Germany)	13
26	1988	Alexander Chernin (USSR)	15
27	1989	Igor Novikov (USSR)	16
28	1991	Joël Lautier (France)	12
29	1992	Oleg Romanishin (Ukraine)	12
30	1993	Gennadi Sosonko (Netherlands)	12
31	1994	Evgeny Mochalov (Belarus)	Open
32	1995	Veselin Topalov (Bulgaria)	12
33	1996	Alexander Beliavsky (Slovenia)	12
34	1997	Sergei Rublevsky (Russia)	10
35	1998	Boris Gelfand (Belarus)	10
36	1999	Loek van Wely (Netherlands)	10
37	2000	Boris Gelfand (Israel)	10
38	2001	Vladimir Baklan (Ukraine)	Open
39	2002	Alexander Zubarev (Ukraine)	Open
40	2003	David Navara (Czech Republic)	Open
41	2005	Paweł Czarnota (Poland)	Open
42	2006	Robert Kempiński (Poland)	10
43	2007	Bartosz Soćko (Poland)	10
44	2008	Alexander Moiseenko (Ukraine)	10
45	2009	Wojciech Moranda (Poland)	Open
46	2010	Kacper Piorun (Poland)	Open
47	2011	Aleksander Hnydiuk (Poland)	10
49	2013	Wojciech Moranda (Poland)	10
50	2014	Vadim Shishkin (Ukraine)	10
51	2015	Tomasz Warakomski (Poland)	10
52	2016	Marcin Szeląg (Poland)	Open
53	2017	Tomasz Warakomski (Poland)	Open
54	2018	Artur Frolov (Ukraine)	Open
55	2019	Tomasz Warakomski (Poland)	Open
56	2020	Sergei Ovsejevitsch (Ukraine)	Open
57	2021	Kirill Shevchenko (Ukraine); David Navara (Czech Republic)	10
58	2022	Alexander Donchenko (Germany); Dimitrios Mastrovasilis (Greece)	10
59	2023	Grzegorz Nasuta (Poland)	10
60	2024	Vincent Keymer (Germany)	10
61	2025	Nodirbek Yakubboev (Uzbekistan)	10
62	2026	Awonder Liang (United States)	10

== 2024 ==
60th Akiba Rubinstein Memorial Grandmaster tournament, 17 August – 25 August 2024, Polanica-Zdrój, Poland, Category XVIII (2686.8)
	Player	Rating	1	2	3	4	5	6	7	8	9	10	Points	H2H	No. of wins	SB
1	Vincent Keymer (Germany)	2719		½	0	1	0	1	½	1	1	1	6			
2	David Navara (Czechia)	2674	½		½	½	1	½	½	½	½	½	5	2		
3	Sam Shankland (United States)	2669	1	½		½	½	½	½	½	0	1	5	1½	2	22.50
4	Vladimir Fedoseev (Slovenia)	2687	0	½	½		½	½	½	½	1	1	5	1½	2	20.00
5	Jan-Krzysztof Duda (Poland)	2733	1	0	½	½		½	½	½	1	½	5	1		
6	Alexey Sarana (Serbia)	2717	0	½	½	½	½		½	½	1	½	4½	½	1	
7	Radosław Wojtaszek (Poland)	2680	½	½	½	½	½	½		½	½	½	4½	½	0	
8	Pentala Harikrishna (India)	2692	0	½	½	½	½	½	½		½	½	4			
9	Andrei Volokitin (Ukraine)	2667	0	½	1	0	0	0	½	½		1	3½			
10	Mateusz Bartel (Poland)	2630	0	½	0	0	½	½	½	½	0		2½			

== 2025 ==
61st Akiba Rubinstein Memorial Grandmaster tournament, 15 August – 24 August 2025, Polanica-Zdrój, Poland, Category XVI (2634)
	Player	Rating	1	2	3	4	5	6	7	8	9	10	Points	H2H	No. of wins
1	Nodirbek Yakubboev (Uzbekistan)	2663		½	½	½	½	½	1	1	1	1	6½		
2	Radosław Wojtaszek (Poland)	2651	½		½	1	½	½	½	1	½	1	6		
3	Matthias Blübaum (Germany)	2660	½	½		½	½	½	½	1	1	½	5½		
4	David Navara (Czechia)	2650	½	0	½		½	½	1	½	½	1	5		
5	Aravindh Chithambaram (India)	2723	½	½	½	½		½	0	1	1	0	4½	½	2
6	Igor Kovalenko (Ukraine)	2676	½	½	½	½	½		½	½	½	½	4½	½	0
7	Mateusz Bartel (Poland)	2576	0	½	½	0	1	½		½	½	½	4		
8	Michael Adams (England)	2663	0	0	0	½	0	½	½		½	1	3	1½	
9	Paweł Teclaf (Poland)	2570	0	½	0	½	0	½	½	½		½	3	1	
10	Jan Klimkowski (Poland)	2517	0	0	½	0	1	½	½	0	½		3	½	

== 2026 ==
62nd Akiba Rubinstein Memorial Grandmaster tournament, 15 August – 23 August 2026, Polanica-Zdroj, Poland, Category XVI (2641.8)
	Player	Rating	1	2	3	4	5	6	7	8	9	10	Points	H2H	No. of wins	SB
1	Awonder Liang (United States)	2690		0	½	1	½	1	½	½	½	1	5½		3	23.50
2	Vladimir Fedoseev (Slovenia)	2693	1		1	½	½	0	½	1	½	0	5	2	3	23.50
3	Jan Malek (Poland)	2573	½	0		1	½	1	1	½	½	0	5	1½	3	22.75
4	Haik M. Martirosyan (Armenia)	2662	0	½	0		1	1	½	½	½	1	5	1½	3	21.00
5	Radosław Wojtaszek (Poland)	2655	½	½	½	0		½	½	1	½	1	5	1	2	21.00
6	Szymon Gumularz (Poland)	2625	0	1	0	0	½		1	½	1	½	4½		3	19.00
7	Igor Kovalenko (Ukraine)	2669	½	½	0	½	½	0		0	1	1	4	1	2	17.25
8	Sam Shankland (United States)	2653	½	0	½	½	0	½	1		0	1	4	1	2	17.00
9	Pentala Harikrishna (India)	2655	½	½	½	½	½	0	0	1		½	4	1	1	18.25
10	Jakub Seemann (Poland)	2543	0	1	1	0	0	½	0	0	½		3		2	14.25
