= 1st Chess Paralympiad =

2023 chess tournament in Belgrade, Serbia

- Official logo of the 1st FIDE Chess Olympiad for People with Disabilities
- Host city: Belgrade
- Country: Serbia
- Organizer: FIDE
- Edition: 1st
- Nations: 33
- Teams: 26
- Athletes: Over 100
- Sport: Chess
- Dates: 29 January – 5 February 2023
- Main venue: Crowne Plaza Belgrade

Medalists

Team
- 1st place, gold medalist(s): Poland
- 2nd place, silver medalist(s): IPCA
- 3rd place, bronze medalist(s): Philippines

The 1st Chess Paralympiad, officially the 1st FIDE Chess Olympiad for People with Disabilities, was an international team chess tournament held at the Crowne Plaza hotel in Belgrade, Serbia, from 29 January to 5 February 2023. Organized by the International Chess Federation (FIDE), it was the first over-the-board edition of the competition for players with visual, hearing and physical impairments. The six-round Swiss-system event brought together 26 teams and more than 100 players from 33 countries. Poland won all six matches and took the gold medal, followed by the International Physically Disabled Chess Association (IPCA) and the Philippines.

== Background ==
FIDE announced the inaugural competition in January 2020 under the name 1st World Chess Paralympiad. It was scheduled for 28 July to 5 August 2020 in Khanty-Mansiysk, Russia. On 24 March 2020, the FIDE Council postponed it together with the 44th Chess Olympiad because of the COVID-19 pandemic, initially rescheduling both events for the summer of 2021. Serbia was subsequently selected to host the first over-the-board event, which took place in Belgrade in 2023.

A separate Online Chess Olympiad for People with Disabilities took place from 20 November to 3 December 2020. It attracted 61 teams from 45 countries and nearly 400 players; Poland defeated Russia in the final. The online tournament was not the same event as the inaugural over-the-board Paralympiad in Belgrade.

== Participants and format ==
The final field consisted of 26 teams and over 100 players from 33 countries.

The tournament was a six-round Swiss-system competition, with matches played over four boards. Teams could combine players with hearing, physical and visual impairments. The 2023 regulations recommended, but did not require, a female player in each team. The time control was 90 minutes for the first 40 moves, followed by 30 minutes for the remainder of the game, with a 30-second increment from move one. The default time was 15 minutes.

A team received two match points for a match win, one for a draw and none for a loss. Teams level on match points were separated first by game points and then by Sonneborn–Berger score.

== Opening and accessibility ==
The opening ceremony took place at the National Assembly of Serbia on 29 January. About 150 people attended, and the presentations included subtitles and sign-language interpretation. FIDE president Arkady Dvorkovich, Serbian sports minister Zoran Gajic, sponsor representative Vadim Smirnov and Serbian Chess Federation president Dragan Lazic addressed the audience. A drawing of lots gave top-seeded Poland the white pieces on the first board in round one.

Depending on a player's needs, organizers provided specialized boards and clocks, adapted scoresheets, audio-visual equipment, mobility access, personal assistance and additional support and medical staff. The arrangements were designed for players with different needs.

== Tournament progress ==
Poland began with a 3–1 win over Germany, although Matthias Dorner won Germany's game on board three. The opening round also produced two surprises: Serbia 2 defeated Croatia 2.5–1.5, while Zimbabwe drew with an ICCD team that had two players rated above 2000.

The top-seeded Polish team then defeated IPCA 2.5–1.5, FIDE 3.5–0.5, the Philippines 2.5–1.5 and India 3–1 before meeting Israel in the final round. Marcin Tazbir played board one in every match and finished with two wins and four draws. Marcin Molenda scored 5.5 points from 6 games on board two. Across the six matches, Poland lost only three individual games and accumulated 17.5 game points from 24.

Poland needed only two game points from its final match but defeated second-seeded Israel 3–1. Tazbir drew with Yehuda Gruenfeld, while Pawel Piekielny and Jacek Stachanczyk won on the other boards. Molenda drew with Andrey Streltsov after 65 moves. Israel finished eighth.

== Results ==
Poland's six match victories gave it 12 match points and the gold medal. It was the country's first Olympiad gold medal in chess since 1930. IPCA took silver with 10 points; its only defeat was the second-round loss to Poland, and it closed the tournament by beating Hungary 2.5–1.5.

Poland's gold-medal squad consisted of Tazbir, Molenda, Pawel Piekielny, Piotr Dukaczewski and Jacek Stachanczyk.

Before the last round, the Philippines had beaten Uzbekistan 3.5–0.5, the Czech Republic 2.5–1.5 and Serbia 2 3.5–0.5, lost 1.5–2.5 to Poland and drawn 2–2 with Israel. The bronze medal was then decided in the final-round meeting between the Philippines and India, which ended 2–2. Darry Bernardo defeated Naveen Kumar in 79 moves of a Caro–Kann, while Sander Severino and Henry Roger Lopez drew their games and James Infiesto lost. The Philippines and India finished level on 8 match points and 15 game points, but the Philippines prevailed on the Sonneborn–Berger tie-break, 91 points to 81. Serbia 1 and Uzbekistan also finished on 8 match points.

Top six teams
Rank	Team	Match points	Game points	Sonneborn–Berger
1	Poland	12	17.5	114.5
2	IPCA	10	17	89.5
3	Philippines	8	15	91
4	India	8	15	81
5	Serbia 1	8	14.5	72.5
6	Uzbekistan	8	12.5	70.5

Several lower-seeded teams finished above their starting positions. India began 10th in the seeding list but placed fourth, while Uzbekistan rose from 20th to sixth. Host team Serbia 1 recovered from a slow start to finish fifth; its 18-year-old board-one player, Jovan Pavicevic, scored 4 points and gained nearly 20 rating points.

The individual gold medals went to Predrag Nikac of Montenegro on board one, Molenda on board two, Dorner on board three and Bernardo on board four. Mihai Dima of Romania won the reserve-board prize. Bernardo finished with 5.5 points from 6 games, and Severino added a board-one silver for the Philippines with 4.5 points from 6 games.

== Reception and legacy ==
The closing ceremony took place in the same Crowne Plaza hall used for the matches. Belgrade city officials attended alongside FIDE deputy chair Dana Reizniece-Ozola and FIDE Special Tasks Director Akaki Iashvili. Reizniece-Ozola thanked the Serbian government and chess federation, sponsors, arbiters and volunteers, and acknowledged the feedback from players and disability organizations.

Chess24 reported criticism of FIDE over the sponsorship of Serbian oil company NIS because of the company's links to Russian energy group Gazprom. The report named Peter Heine Nielsen and Berlin Chess Federation president Paul Meyer-Dunker among the critics. FIDE said it was pleased with the organization of the event.

Thomas Luther, who had led the FIDE commission involved in establishing the event, said that future editions should use the lessons from Belgrade to increase participation and improve organization. Reizniece-Ozola announced that future bidders for the main Chess Olympiad would also have to commit to organizing the Olympiad for people with disabilities, establishing it as a regular feature rather than a one-off event.
