= Andrzej Filipowicz =

Polish chess player (born 1938)

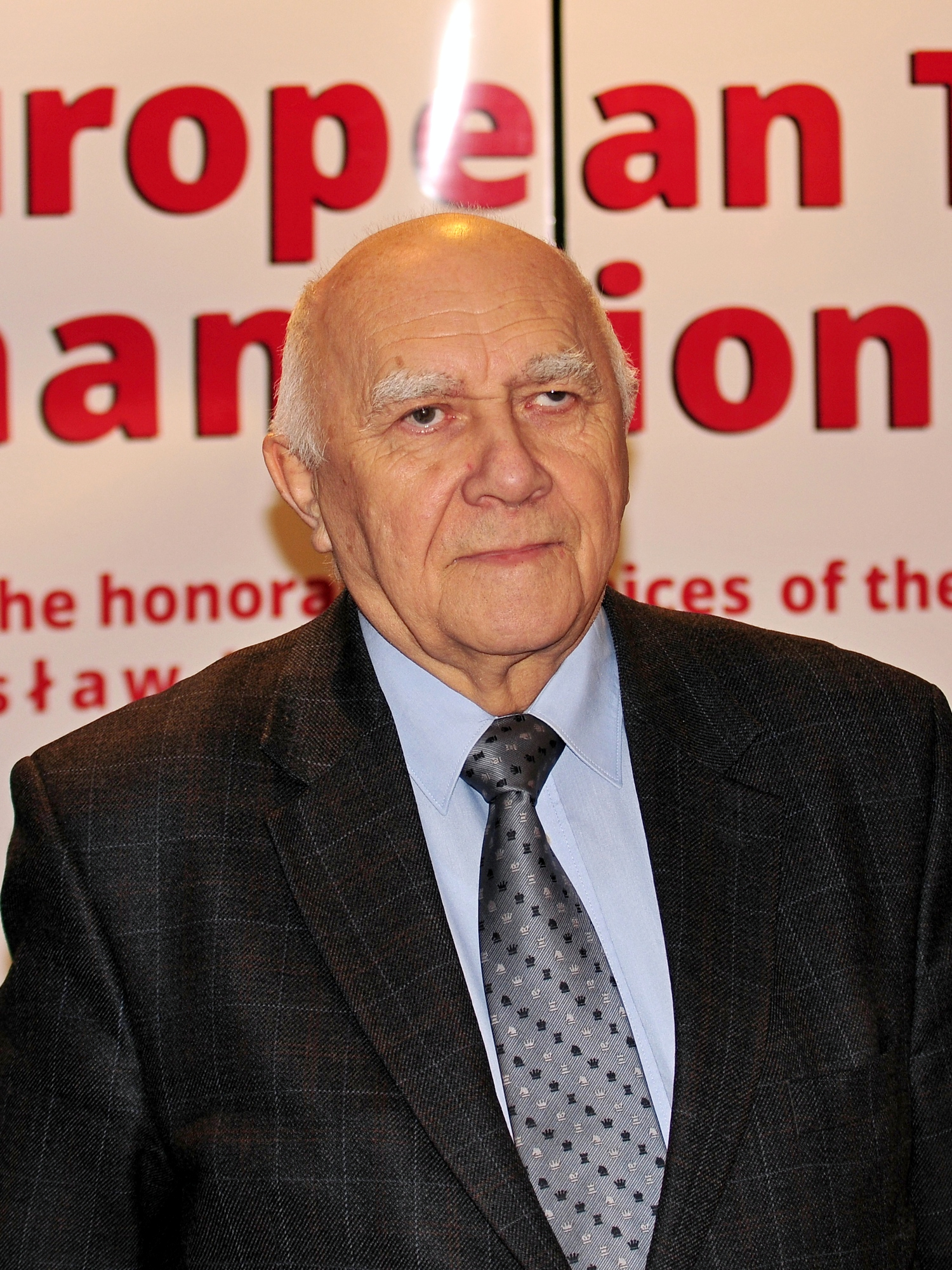
- Filipowicz in 2013

Personal information
- Born: 13 May 1938 (age 88) Warsaw, Poland

Chess career
- Country: Poland
- Title: International Master (1975)
- Peak rating: 2430 (July 1970)

Andrzej Filipowicz (born 13 May 1938) is a Polish chess player. He received the FIDE titles of International Master (IM) in 1975, International Arbiter in 1984, and FIDE Honorary Member in 2006.

== Biography ==
In the years 1959–1980, Andrzej Filipowicz eighteen times participated in the Polish Chess Championships finals which were most successful in 1971 in Poznań, where he won a bronze medal. Andrzej Filipowicz was winner of many international chess tournament awards, including shared first place with Bruno Parma in Rubinstein Memorial in Polanica-Zdrój (1964). He was awarded the FIDE International Master (IM) title in 1975.

Andrzej Filipowicz played for Poland in the Chess Olympiads:

- In 1960, at second reserve board in the 14th Chess Olympiad in Leipzig (+4, =4, -3),
- In 1962, at second reserve board in the 15th Chess Olympiad in Varna (+4, =2, -3),
- In 1964, at fourth board in the 16th Chess Olympiad in Tel Aviv (+2, =8, -4),
- In 1966, at second reserve board in the 17th Chess Olympiad in Havana (+2, =3, -3),
- In 1970, at second reserve board in the 19th Chess Olympiad in Siegen (+4, =3, -1),
- In 1972, at first reserve board in the 20th Chess Olympiad in Skopje (+7, =7, -2).

Andrzej Filipowicz played for Poland in the European Team Chess Championship:

- In 1973, at fourth board in the 5th European Team Chess Championship in Bath (+0, =4, -2).

From the mid-1970s, Andrzej Filipowicz became known as a chess activist. During this period, for the first time he was elected to the Board of the Polish Chess Federation, in whose he was in the next several decades. In 1993, Andrzej Filipowicz was awarded the title of an Honorary Member of the Polish Chess Federation. From 1978, he also held many functions in the structures of FIDE, including chairman of the FIDE Classification Committee, a member of the FIDE Central Committee and the FIDE Executive Board, as well as the President of the Eastern European Zone. Currently, Andrzej Filipowicz is the secretary of the FIDE Technical Commission. In 2006, as the third Polish chess player in history after Dawid Przepiórka and Mieczysław Najdorf, he was honored with the title of Honorary Member of FIDE.

In 1984 Andrzej Filipowicz was awarded the title of FIDE International Arbiter. He has been a chief arbiter in major chess tournaments such as Classical World Chess Championship Match 2000, Classical World Chess Championship Candidates Tournament 2002, FIDE World Blitz Championship 2006, World Junior Chess Championship 2010, World Rapid & Blitz Chess Championship 2012 and 2013, World Women's Rapid & Blitz Chess Championship 2014, World Chess Championship Championship Match 2014.

In 1971 Andrzej Filipowicz obtained the title of doctor of technical sciences at the Warsaw University of Technology. In 1986-1990 he was the editor-in-chief of the Polish chess magazine Szachy but later worked in chess magazines Szachisty and Szachista.
