= Vladimir Karasev =

Russian chess player (1938–2021)

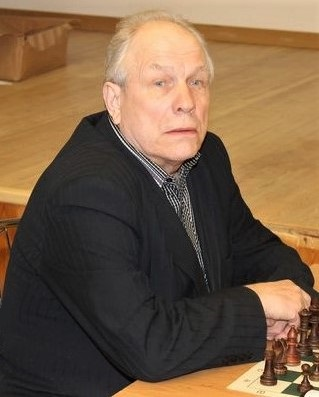
- Karasev in 2015
- Born: 17 June 1938; Leningrad, Russian SFSR
- Died: 9 July 2021 (aged 83); Saint Petersburg, Russia
- Occupation: Chess player

Vladimir Karasev (Russian: Владимир Карасёв; 17 June 1938 – 9 July 2021) was a Russian chess player. He had been an International Master since 1976 and was champion of Leningrad in 1974 and Senior European Champion in 2015.

== Biography ==
Karasev participated in the USSR Chess Championship in 1967, 1970, and 1971. In 1965, 1970, and 1982, he tied for first in the Leningrad City Chess Championship, losing the tie-breaker in 1965 and 1970. He was champion of the city in 1974. He won the Rubinstein Memorial in Polanica-Zdrój in 1974. In 1976, he became an International Master and finished second in the championship of Albena. In 1977, he reached the rank of 74th in the world with an Elo rating of 2515 points. He was Russian veteran champion in 2001, 2002, and 2004, and was European senior champion in 2015.

Vladimir Karasev died in Saint Petersburg on 9 July 2021, at the age of 83.
