= Orzech =

Orzech may refer to:

- Orzech (surname), a family name
- Orzech, Silesian Voivodeship, Poland
