= Szeląg =

Szeląg may refer to the following places in Poland:

- Szeląg, Poznań, a neighbourhood in the city of Poznań
- Szeląg, Warmian-Masurian Voivodeship, a village in north Poland
- szeląg - Polish shilling
- Marcin Szeląg (born 1981) - Polish chess master and computer scientist
