= Artur Jakubiec =

Polish chess grandmaster (born 1973)

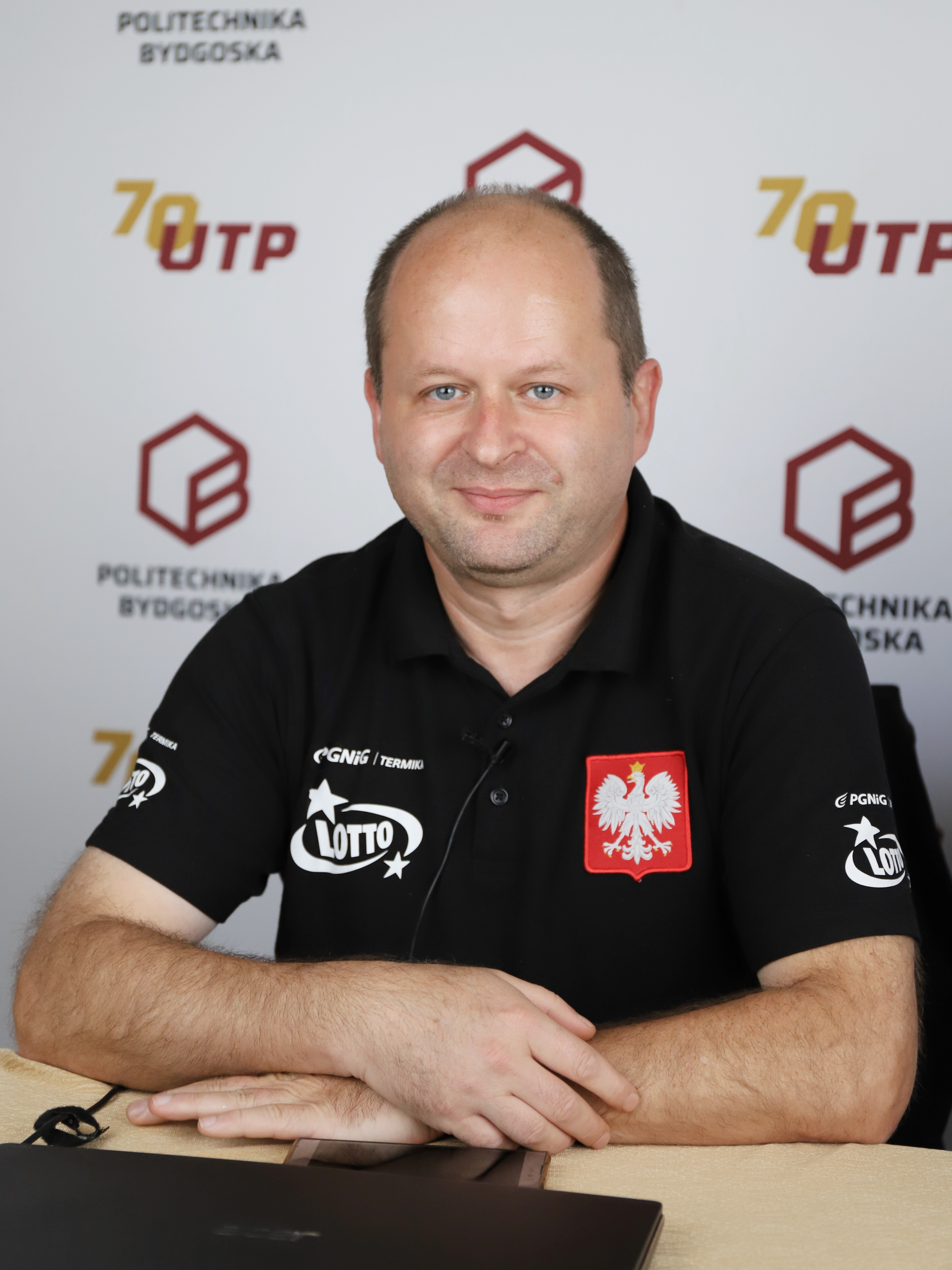
- Jakubiec in 2021

Personal information
- Born: 3 December 1973 (age 52) Wadowice, Poland

Chess career
- Country: Poland
- Title: Grandmaster (2002)
- FIDE rating: 2420 (July 2026)
- Peak rating: 2565 (July 2004)

Artur Jakubiec (born 3 December 1973) is a Polish chess Grandmaster, a title he was awarded in 2002.

== Chess career ==
A twice Polish Junior Chess Championship winner, he won the U15s in 1988 and the U18s in 1991. In 1988/1989 he came 4th in the U16s at the European Youth Chess Championship in Saltsjöbaden and in 1991 he finished 9th in the U18s at the World Junior Chess Championship in Guarapuava, Brazil. In 1993 he made his debut in the Polish Chess Championship. He achieved his best result in the competition in 2004, finishing 6th. Artur Jakubiec has also competed successfully in several Polish Team Chess Championships, winning silver in 1991, 1994, 1995 and 2000. In 2003 was second (behind Hannes Stefánsson) in the Chess Summer tournament in Aarhus. In 2005 he was second in the Polish Blitz Chess Championship in Polanica-Zdrój. In 2006/2007 he won the Cracovia A open tournament, held in Kraków. In 2013 he shared first place in the International Championship of Malopolska. Since September 2007 Artur Jakubiec has been the coach of the Polish national men's team.

== Personal life ==
In 2008 he married Edyta Jakubiec (born 1981) who is a Woman's International Master (WIM, 2005).
