= Anna Warakomska =

Polish chess player (born 1992)

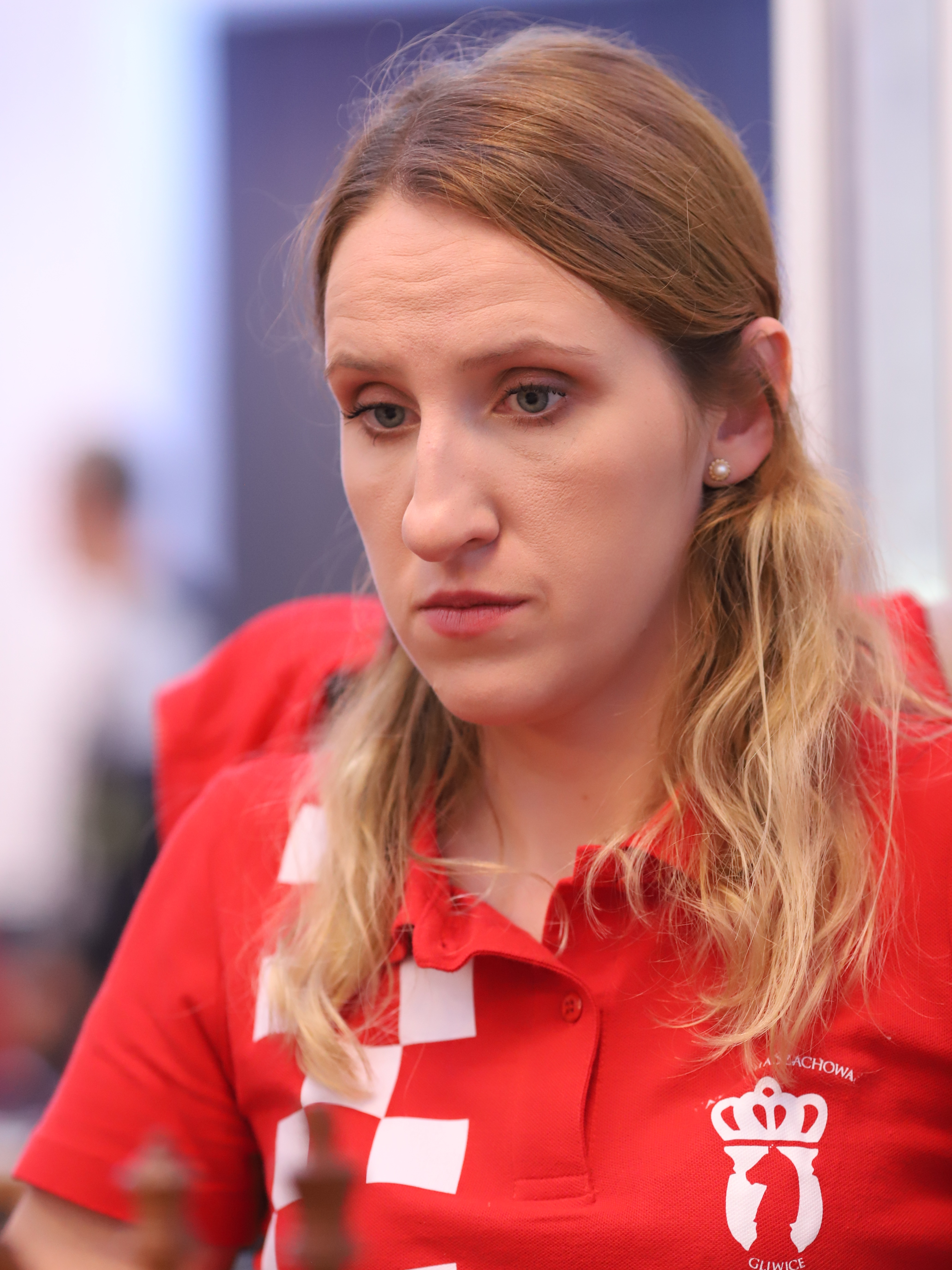
- Warakomska in 2022

Personal information
- Born: 3 September 1992 (age 33) Suwałki, Poland

Chess career
- Country: Poland
- Title: Woman Grandmaster (2020)
- FIDE rating: 2212 (April 2019)
- Peak rating: 2365 (October 2016)

Anna Warakomska (born 3 September 1992) is a Polish chess player who holds the FIDE title of Woman Grandmaster (WGM, 2020).

== Biography ==
Anna Warakomska many times participated in the Polish Youth Chess Championships in different girls' age groups, where she won six medals: gold (2009 - U18), three silver (2002 - U10, 2004 - U12, 2010 - U18) and bronze (2008 - U16). She also won three medals in Polish Youth Fast Chess Championships in different girls' age groups: gold (2006 - U14), silver (2004 - U12) and bronze (2005 - U14). In 2006, she ranked 4th in European Youth Chess Championship in girls U14 age group.

In 2008, in Kraków, Warakomska won a bronze medal in Polish Women's Chess Championship. In 2014, in Bydgoszcz she won bronze medal in Polish Women's Blitz Chess Championship. In 2016, Warakomska won a bronze medal at the Academic Women's World Championship in Abu Dhabi. In 2018, in Warsaw she shared 1st-2nd place with Jolanta Zawadzka in Polish Women's Chess Championship but lost additional match for champion's title.

In 2015, she awarded the FIDE Woman International Master (WIM) title. In 2020, she awarded the FIDE Woman Grandmaster (WGM) title.

== Personal life ==
Anna Warakomska is the youngest sister of the Polish chess Grandmaster Tomasz Warakomski (born 1989).
