= Wojciech Moranda =

Polish chess grandmaster (born 1988)

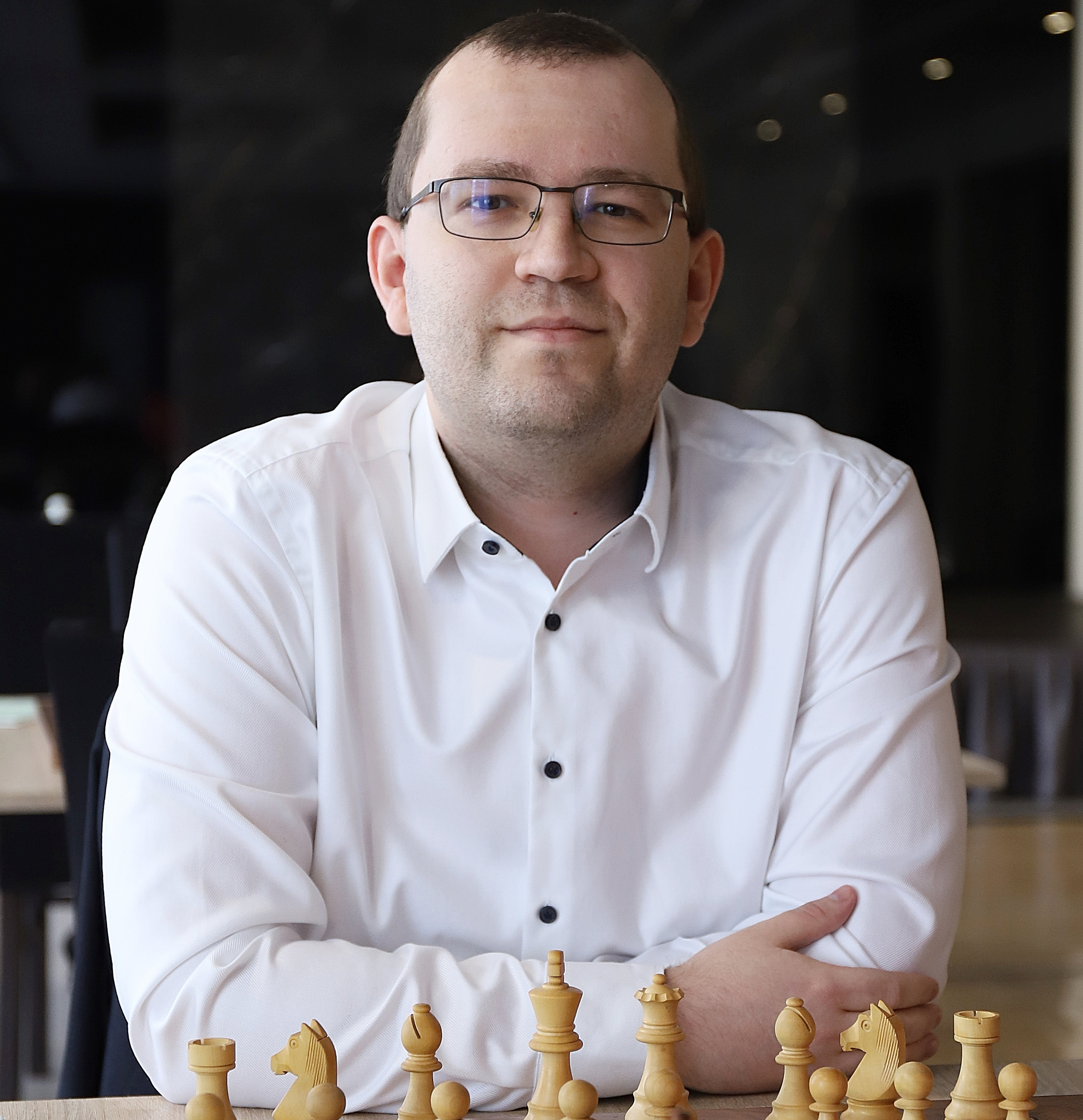
- Moranda in 2022

Personal information
- Born: 17 August 1988 (age 37) Kielce, Poland

Chess career
- Country: Poland
- Title: Grandmaster (2009)
- FIDE rating: 2507 (July 2026)
- Peak rating: 2636 (June 2022)

Wojciech Moranda (born 17 August 1988) is a Polish chess Grandmaster (2009).

== Chess career ==
Moranda won multiple Polish Junior Chess Championship medals: Two golds (2003 [U16]. 2007 [U20]), two silvers (2005 [U18], 2006 [U18]), and one bronze (2002 [U14]). He also won medals in the Polish Junior Rapid Chess Championship and often represented Poland at the World Junior Chess Championship and European Youth Chess Championship. In 2005, Moranda made his debut in the Polish Chess Championship final in Poznań, where he took 11th place. In 2009, he won the Rubinstein Memorial in Polanica-Zdrój. In 2010, he came in third at the Polish Blitz Chess Championship in Myślibórz. Moranda has also competed successfully in several Polish Team Chess Championships (team gold in 2014). In 2012, he won the Polish Student Championship in Katowice. Moranda represented Poland at the 2013 Summer Universiade where team Poland took mixed team bronze. In May 2024, in Rzeszów he ranked in 4th place in Polish Chess Championship.
