= Orzech (surname) =

Orzech is a Polish surname. Notable people with the surname include:

- Artur Orzech (born 1964), Polish journalist
- Dominik Orzech (born 1982), Polish chess master
- Matt Orzech (born 1995), American football player
- Maurycy Orzech (1891–1943), Polish economist and journalist
