= Dominik Orzech =

Polish chess player (born 1982)

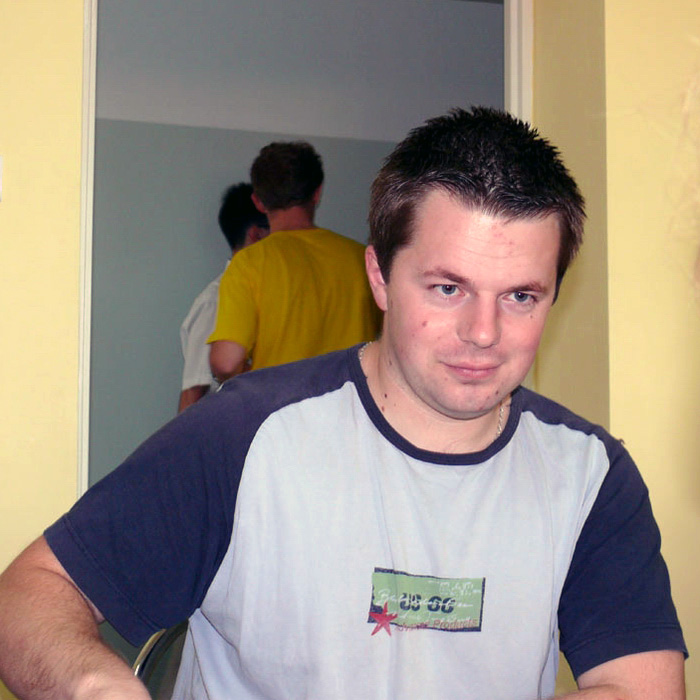
- Dominik Orzech in 2007

Personal information
- Born: 24 April 1982 (age 44) Sulechów, Poland

Chess career
- Country: Poland
- Title: International Master (2009)
- Peak rating: 2483 (October 2007)

Dominik Orzech (born 24 April 1982) is a Polish chess International Master (2009).

== Chess career ==
In 1999 Dominik Orzech won in Nowa Ruda the bronze medal of the Polish Youth Chess Championships in U18 age group. In 2002 he took 2nd place (behind Marek Oliwa) in the Swiss-system tournament in Przełazy. In 2004 he shared the 1st place (together with, among others, Vladimir Malaniuk and Mirosław Grabarczyk) in Jarnołtówek. In 2007, he won the open tournaments in Leutersdorf and Mielno (before Piotr Bobras, Aloyzas Kveinys and Vladimir Malaniuk), shared 2nd place (behind Jakub Czakon, together with Krzysztof Chojnacki) in Rewal (chess tournament Konik Morski Rewal). In 2008 he shared the 2nd place in Guben (behind Aleksander Czerwoński, together with Robert Rabiega), while in 2009 he shared the 1st place (together with, among others, Jurij Zezulkin) in Krynica-Zdrój. In 2010, he won the round-robin tournament in Mariánské Lázně.

In 2007, in Mielno and in 2009, in Bydgoszcz Dominik Orzech won two bronze medal in Polish Blitz Chess Championship.

Dominik Orzech fulfilled the norm for the title of International Master (IM) in 2007 (in Pardubice), 2008 (in Guben) and 2009 (in Deizisau, the Neckar Open tournament).

Dominik Orzech achieved the highest rating in his career so far on October 1, 2007, with a score of 2483 points, he was ranked 28th among Polish chess players.
