= Sergei Ovsejevitsch =

Ukrainian chess player

Personal information
- Born: 4 May 1977 (age 49)

Chess career
- Country: Soviet Union; Ukraine
- Title: Grandmaster (2000)
- FIDE rating: 2564 (July 2026)
- Peak rating: 2617 (October 2019)

Sergei Ovsejevitsch (Ukrainian: Сергій Овсієвич; born 4 May 1977) is a Ukrainian chess Grandmaster (2000).

== Chess career ==
Ovsejevitsch competed in the individual finals of the Ukrainian Chess Championship many times. He achieved his best result in 1993 when he shared second and third places.

Ovsejevitsch has won many international chess tournaments, including winning or sharing the first place in the following tournaments:

- Liechtenstein – OPEN (2008),
- Rheinland-Pfalz-Open (2014),
- VMCG-Schachfestival Open and Grandmaster tournament (2014),
- VMCG-Schachfestival Open tournament (2015),
- Visma Chess Tournament (2016),
- Open Cup of Lviv international chess festival (2018),
- Cassovia international chess tournament (2019),
- Akiba Rubinstein Memorial (2020),
- Bautzener Türme Open (2023).

Ovsejevitsch achieved the highest rating in his career on October 1, 2019, with a score of 2619 points. In 2000, he was awarded the FIDE Grandmaster (GM) title.
