= Paweł Czarnota =

Polish chess player (born 1988)

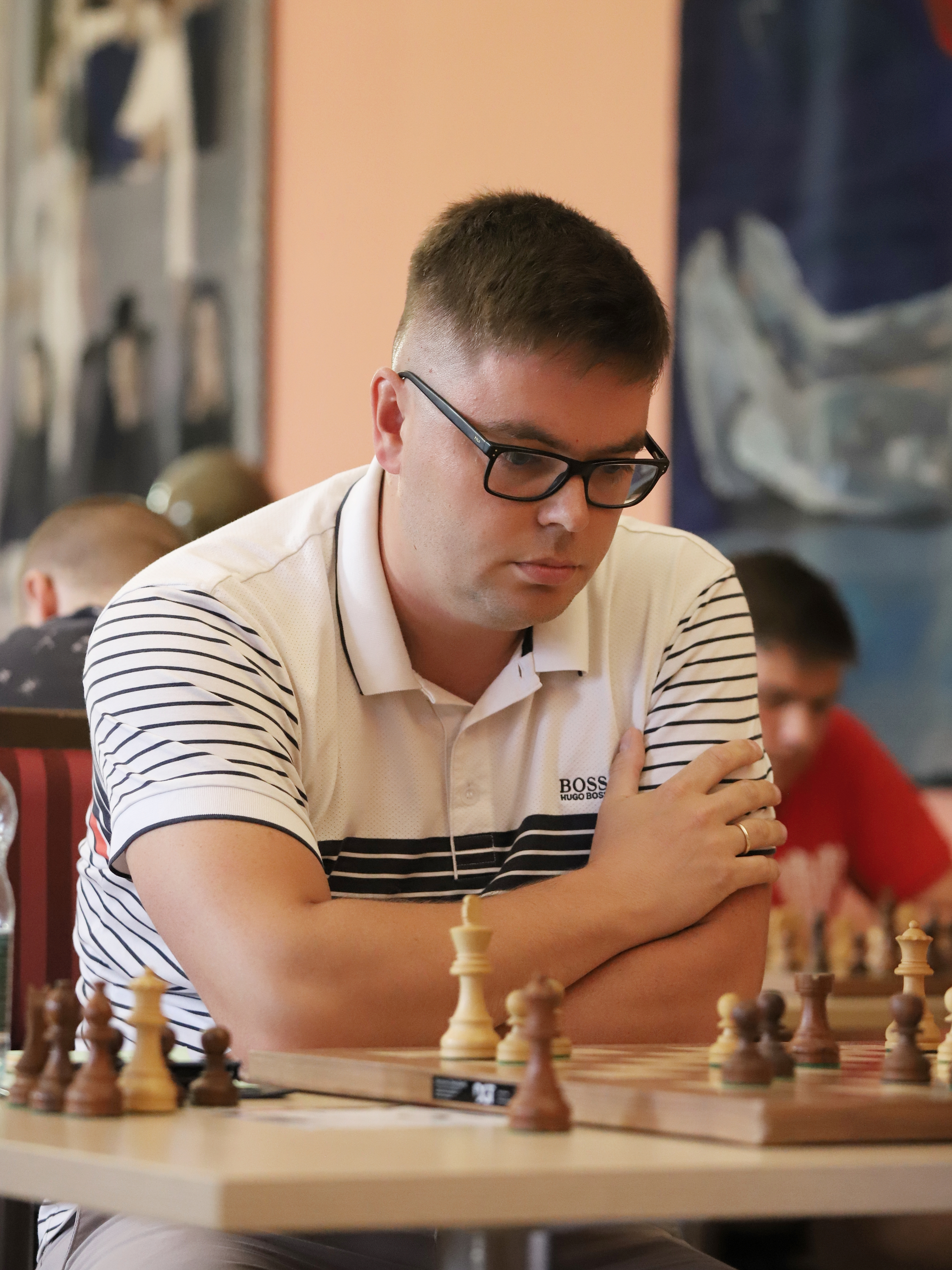
- Czarnota in 2022

Personal information
- Born: 14 April 1988 (age 38) Olkusz, Poland

Chess career
- Country: Poland
- Title: Grandmaster (2006)
- FIDE rating: 2462 (July 2026)
- Peak rating: 2577 (August 2017)

Paweł Czarnota (born 14 April 1988) is a Polish chess grandmaster.

== Chess career ==
Paweł Czarnota is six time Polish Junior Chess Championship winner in different age categories. In 2005 he won European Youth Chess Championship under the age of 18 in Herceg Novi and Rubinstein Memorial in Polanica-Zdrój. Appeared twice in the Polish Chess Championship: 10th place in Poznań (2005) and 6th place in Kraków (2006). He has also competed successfully in several Polish Team Chess Championships. In 2009 Paweł Czarnota shared 1st place in the tournament Cracovia (Kraków) and won the Polish Student Chess Championship in Poznan.

Paweł Czarnota played for Poland in Chess Olympiads:

- In 2006, at second reserve board in the 37th Chess Olympiad in Turin (+4, =1, -3).

== Personal life ==
In 2013 Paweł Czarnota graduated from the University of Silesia in Katowice with degree Master of Laws. His sister Dorota Czarnota is a chess player who holds the FIDE Woman International Master (WIM) title (2005).
