= Jurij Zezulkin =

Polish chess grandmaster (born 1971)

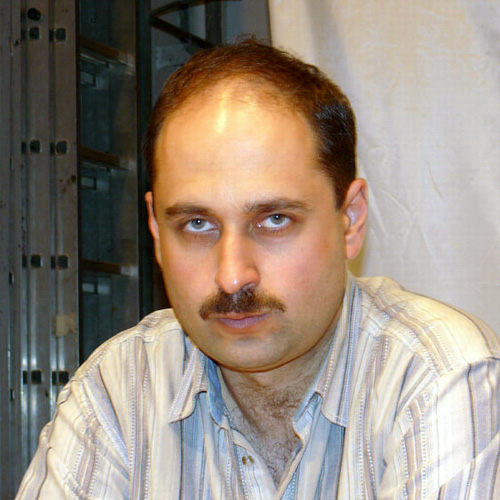
- Zezulkin in Barlinek, 2007

Personal information
- Born: 16 August 1971 (age 54) Minsk, Belarus

Chess career
- Country: Belarus (until 2010); Poland (since 2010)
- Title: Grandmaster (1999)
- FIDE rating: 2401 (July 2026)
- Peak rating: 2558 (July 2004)

Jurij Zezulkin (born 16 August 1971) is a Belarus-born chess grandmaster (1999) who has played for Poland from 2010.

== Chess career ==
In 1989 won Belarus Junior Chess Championship (U18). Jurij Zezulkin is multiple international tournaments winner or 1st place shared: Kraków (1990), Malmö (1992), Gothenburg (1992), Częstochowa (1996), Litomyšl (1997), Mielno (2002), Łeba (2002), Kołobrzeg (2003), Krynica-Zdrój (2009). In the years 2000, 2001, 2003, 2004 and 2005 five times won chess tournament Äskulap in Görlitz. In 2004 won tournament Porzellan Cup in Dresden.

Zezulkin now lives in Poland where he is an organizer of the chess festival Caissa Pol Tour.
