= Piotr Bobras =

Polish chess grandmaster (born 1977)

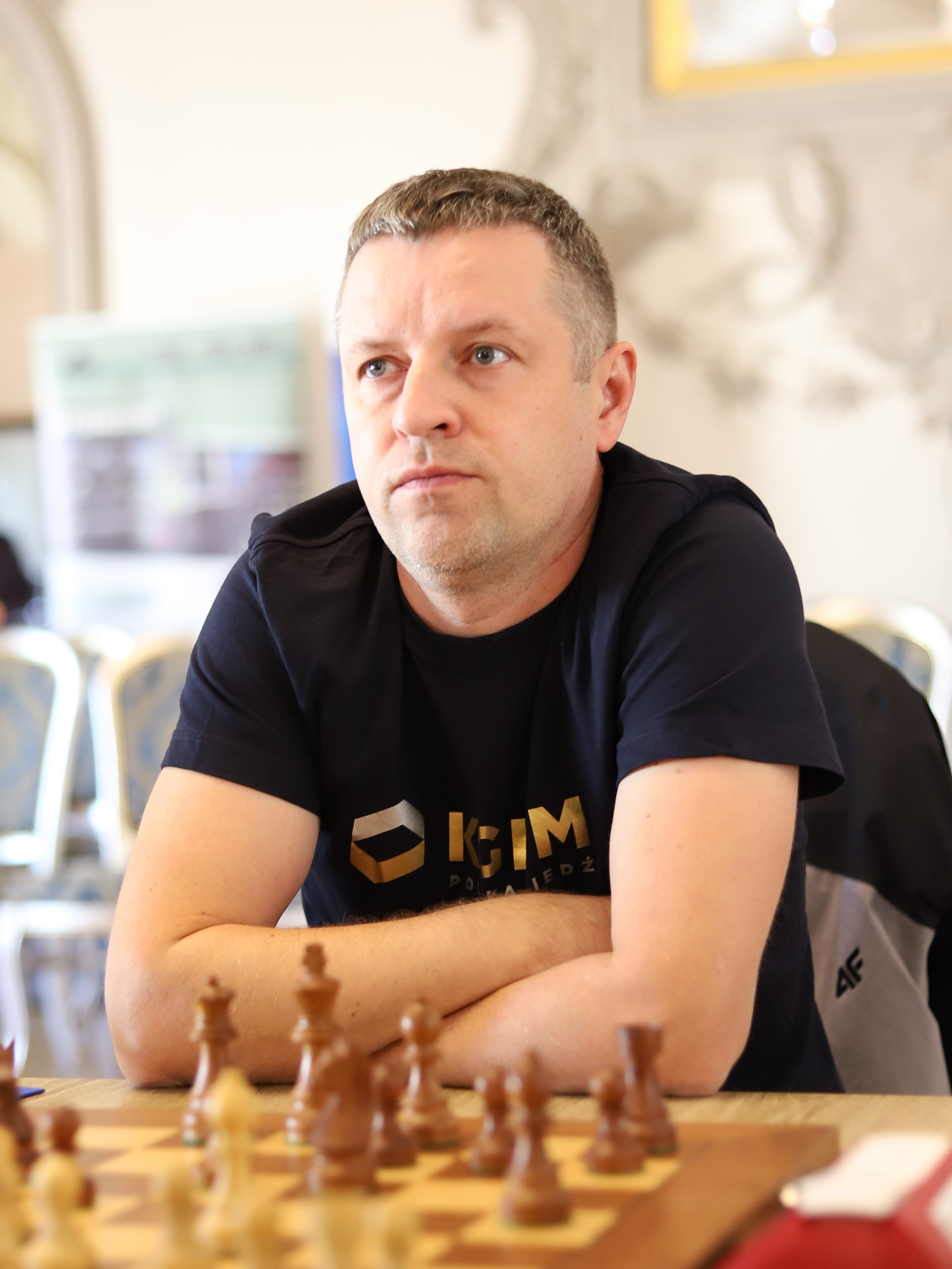
- Piotr Bobras, Legnica 2021

Personal information
- Born: 9 September 1977 (age 48) Białystok, Poland

Chess career
- Country: Poland
- Title: Grandmaster (2005)
- FIDE rating: 2432 (July 2026)
- Peak rating: 2581 (January 2008)

Piotr Bobras (born 9 September 1977) is a Polish chess grandmaster.

== Chess career ==
In 1994 and 1995 Piotr Bobras won bronze medals in the Polish Junior Chess Championship for 18 years. In 1996 he made his debut in the Polish Chess Championship final where took 14th place. In 2005 and 2006 he reaching the best result in Polish Chess Championship - 4th place. In 2004 Piotr Bobras shared first place in the Open tournament in Bad Wiessee with a score of 7½ points of 9 games. Piotr Bobras has also competed successfully in several Polish Team Chess Championships (team gold in 2008, 2010, 2013).

Piotr Bobras played for Poland in European Team Chess Championship:

- In 2005, at fourth board in the 15th European Team Chess Championship in Gothenburg (+2, =3, -1).

== Personal life ==
Piotr Bobras graduated from the Białystok Technical University with a degree in computer science.
