= Marcin Tazbir =

Polish chess grandmaster (born 1988)

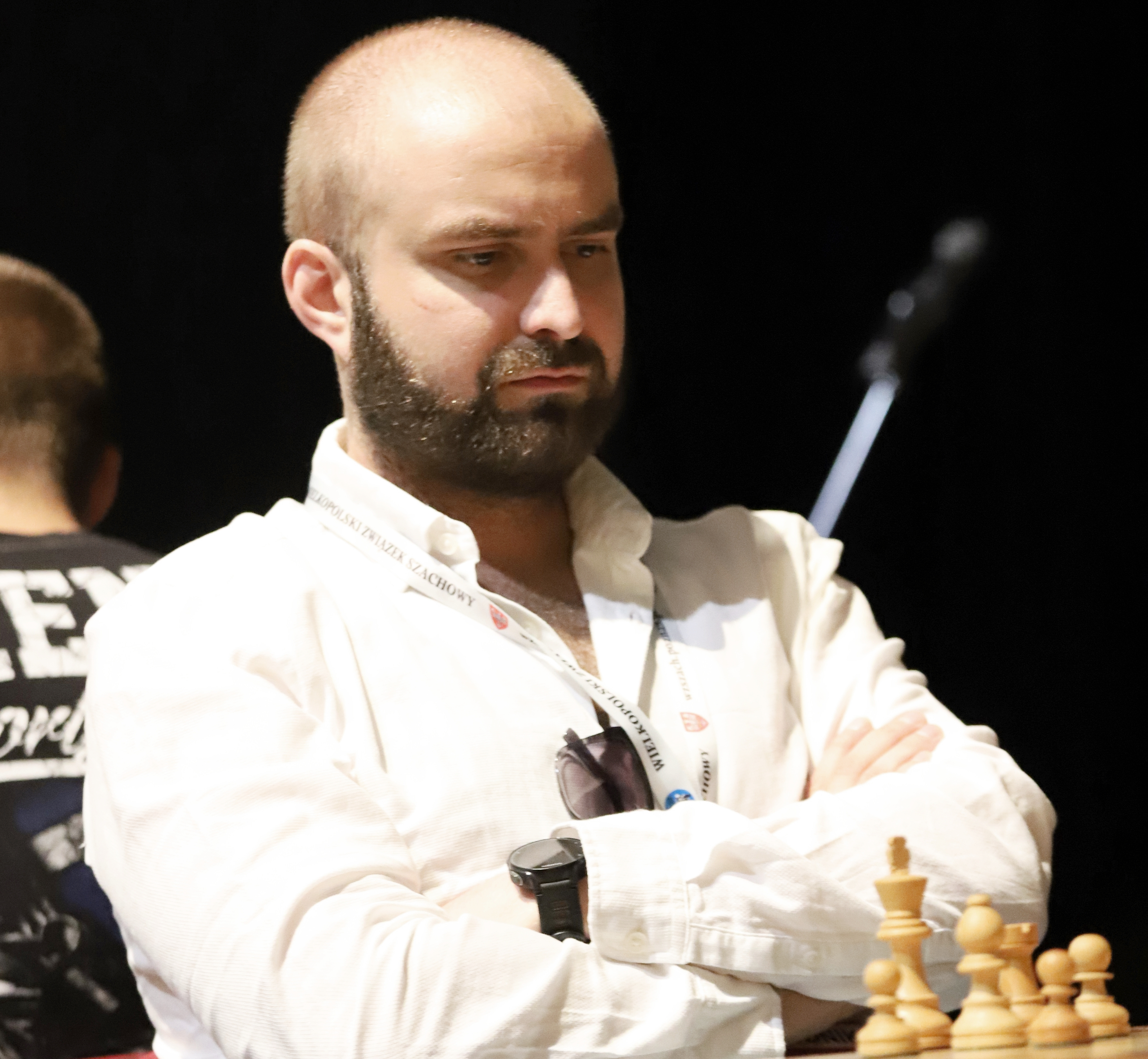
- Tazbir in 2021

Personal information
- Born: 22 August 1988 (age 37) Piotrków Trybunalski, Poland

Chess career
- Country: Poland
- Title: Grandmaster (2013)
- FIDE rating: 2496 (July 2026)
- Peak rating: 2561 (June 2013)

Marcin Tazbir (born 22 August 1988) is a Polish chess grandmaster.

== Chess career ==
A three-time Polish Junior Chess Championship winner: 1998 (U10), 2004 (U16), 2006 (U18). He represented Poland in the World Junior Chess Championship and European Youth Chess Championship several times. He reached his best result in 2006 in Batumi where a group of up to 18 years divided sixth place. In 2006, Tazbir won Miguel Najdorf memorial in Grodzisk Mazowiecki. In 2008 and 2010, he won an international chess tournament in Karviná. In 2008, Tazbir shared first place with Vladimir Malaniuk in fast chess tournament in Opoczno. Tazbir has also competed successfully in several Polish Team Chess Championships (team silver in 2004, 2005).

Tazbir played for Poland in European Team Chess Championship:

- In 2013, at first board (Poland 3) in the 19th European Team Chess Championship in Warsaw (+1, =3, -4).

Tazbir is visually impaired. In 2015, he won the IBCA (International Braille Chess Association) European Title and in 2023 he won the IBCA World Championship.
