= Vadim Shishkin =

Ukrainian chess grandmaster (born 1969)

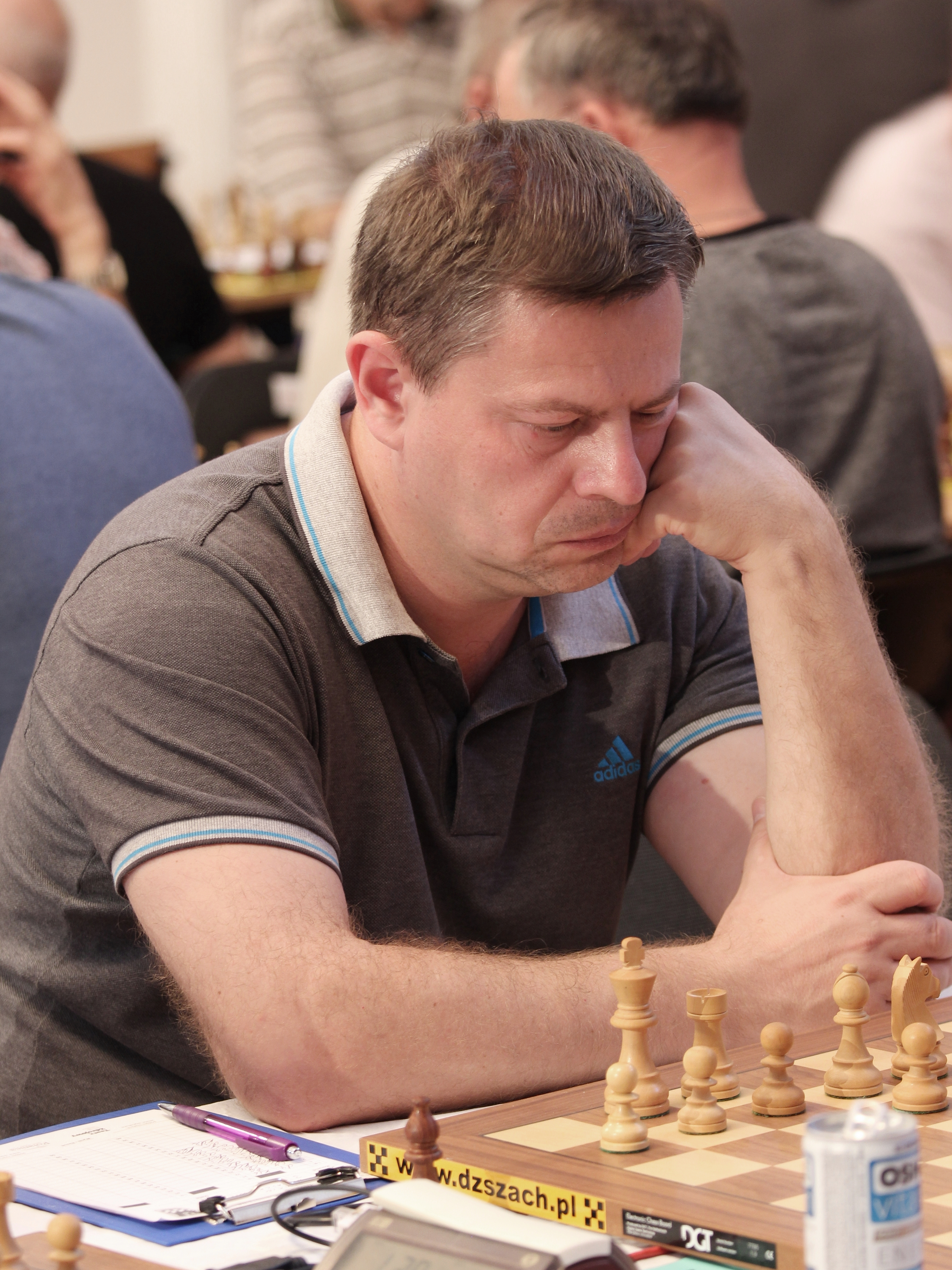
- Shishkin in 2018

Personal information
- Born: 4 March 1969 (age 57) Kyiv, Ukrainian SSR, Soviet Union

Chess career
- Country: Ukraine
- Title: Grandmaster (2007)
- FIDE rating: 2405 (July 2026)
- Peak rating: 2545 (January 2006)

Vadim Shishkin (Ukrainian: Вадим Шишкін, romanized: Vadym Shyshkin, born 4 March 1969) is a Ukrainian chess grandmaster. He is the 2019 World Senior Chess Champion.

Shishkin earned FIDE titles, International Master (IM) in 1995 and Grandmaster (GM) in 2007. He won the 2019 World Senior Chess Championship 50+ category held in Bucharest, Romania.
