= Polanica-Zdrój =

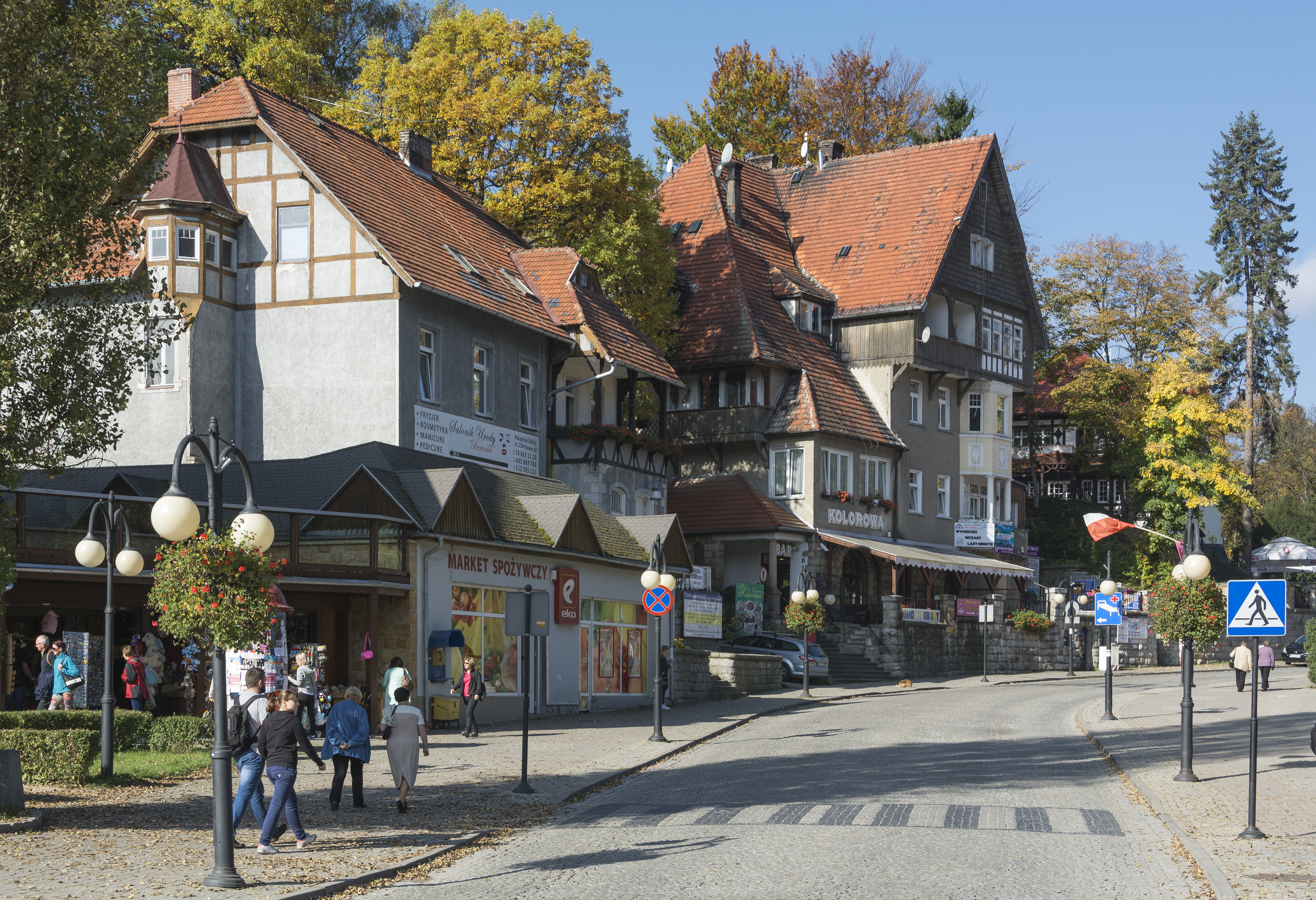
- Central part of Polanica

- Coat of arms

- Location within Poland
- Coordinates: 50°24′N 16°31′E
- Country: Poland
- Voivodeship: Lower Silesian
- County: Kłodzko
- Gmina: Polanica-Zdrój (urban gmina)
- First mentioned: 1347
- Town rights: 1945

Area
  - Total: 17.22 km^{2} (6.65 sq mi)

Population (2021-12-31)
  - Total: 6,110
  - Density: 355/km^{2} (919/sq mi)
- Time zone: UTC+1 (CET)
  - Summer (DST): UTC+2 (CEST)
- Postal code: 57-320
- Area code: +48 74
- License plates: DKL
- Website: http://www.polanica.pl

Polanica-Zdrój [pɔlaˈɲit͡sa ˈzdrui̯] (German: Altheide-Bad) is a spa town in Kłodzko County, Lower Silesian Voivodeship, in south-western Poland. As of 2021, the town has a population of 6,110.

== History ==
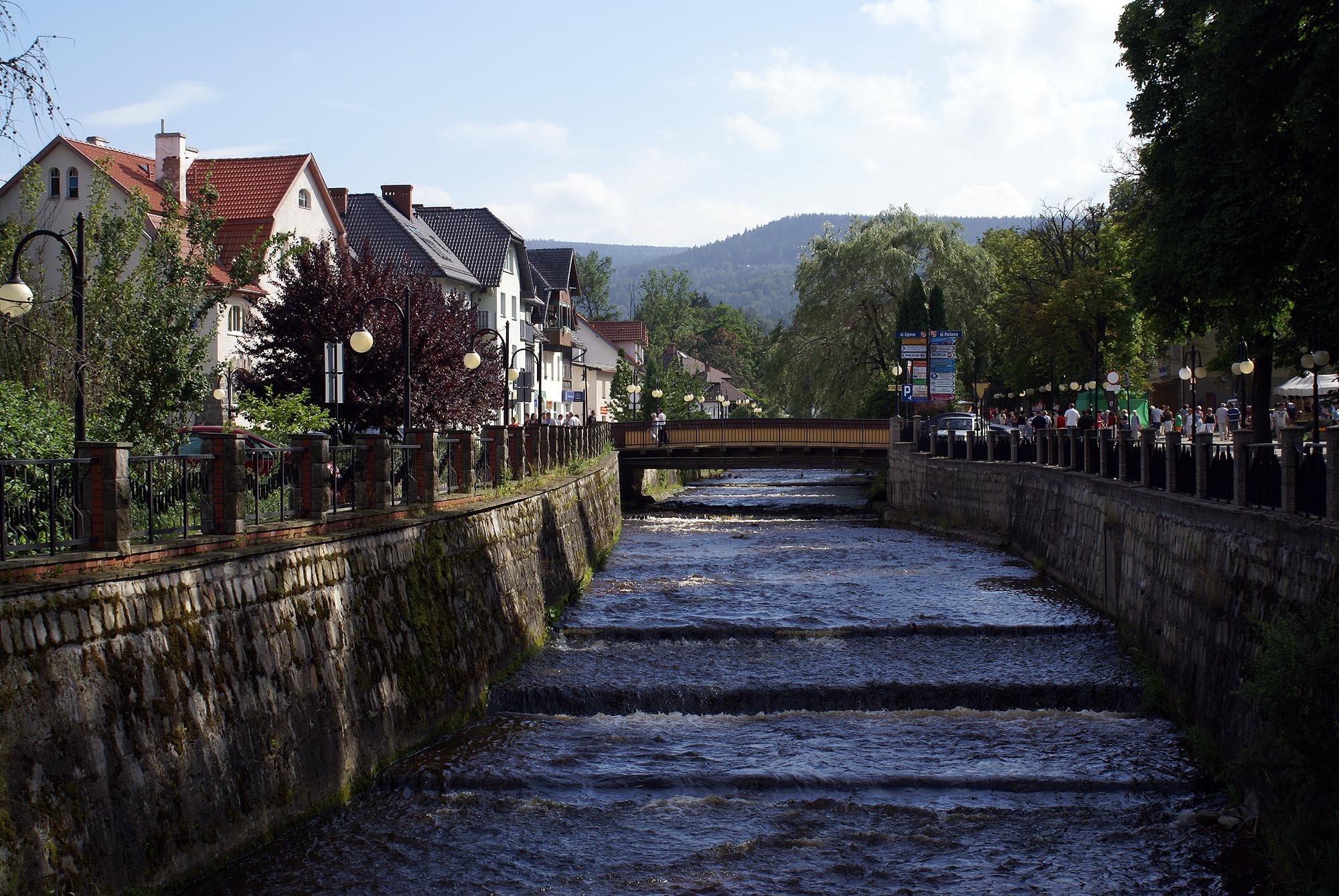
Historic town center of Polanica-Zdrój

Polanica-Zdrój was first documented in 1347 under the name Heyde, when it was part of the Kingdom of Bohemia. At the time it belonged to the House of Glaubitz, and in the following centuries it often changed owners. From the end of the 16th century the village was co-owned by the Jesuits, who contributed to its development. In 1645, it was destroyed by Swedish troops during the Thirty Years' War. In 1742, the settlement – like all the area – was annexed by the Kingdom of Prussia. The settlement grew quickly during the 19th century, becoming a popular health resort in the 1870s, after Prussia had become a component state of Germany in 1871. In 1890, a rail connection to Glatz (Kłodzko) was completed. Until 1933, that is the year the Nazis came to power in Germany, a Polish guesthouse existed in the town. During both world wars the sanatoria were turned into military hospitals. The town became part of Poland after World War II. It was granted town rights in 1945 and its first mayor was Kazimierz Dąbrowski.

On 28 June 1972, the Catholic parishes of Polanica-Zdrój were redeployed from the traditional Hradec Králové diocese (est. 1664; Ecclesiastical Province of Bohemia) into the Archdiocese of Wrocław.

The amateur film festival POL-8 takes place in Polanica-Zdrój. Since 1963, it has hosted the annual Akiba Rubinstein Memorial chess tournament, honoring the great Polish Grandmaster (1882–1961). This event always attracts a high-class field of top players. Polanica-Zdrój hosted the first two international conventions of historians and survivors of the Gross-Rosen concentration camp in 1995 and 1998.

== Demographics ==
Historical population

Year	Pop.	±%
1787	443	—
1816	490	+10.6%
1880	527	+7.6%
1910	1,538	+191.8%
1933	1,831	+19.1%

Year	Pop.	±%
1950	4,482	+144.8%
1960	6,514	+45.3%
1970	6,943	+6.6%
1978	7,399	+6.6%
2006	6,900	−6.7%

== Surroundings ==
- Historical city of Kłodzko with the Kłodzko Fortress with 44 km (27 mi) de galleries & the Saint John bridge (called a "Charles Bridge of Prague in miniature") from 1390, as well as its houses from the 15th and 16th century
- Spa resorts in Duszniki-Zdrój, Kudowa-Zdrój & Lądek-Zdrój
- Śnieżnik Mountains & Stołowe Mountains
- Medieval town of Niemcza
- Cistercian monastery at Henryków
- Wojsławice Arboretum

== Twin towns – sister cities ==
Polanica-Zdrój is twinned with:

- Česká Skalice, Czech Republic
- Janské Lázně, Czech Republic
- Telgte, Germany
- Kartuzy, Poland
- Comacchio, Italy

== Gallery ==
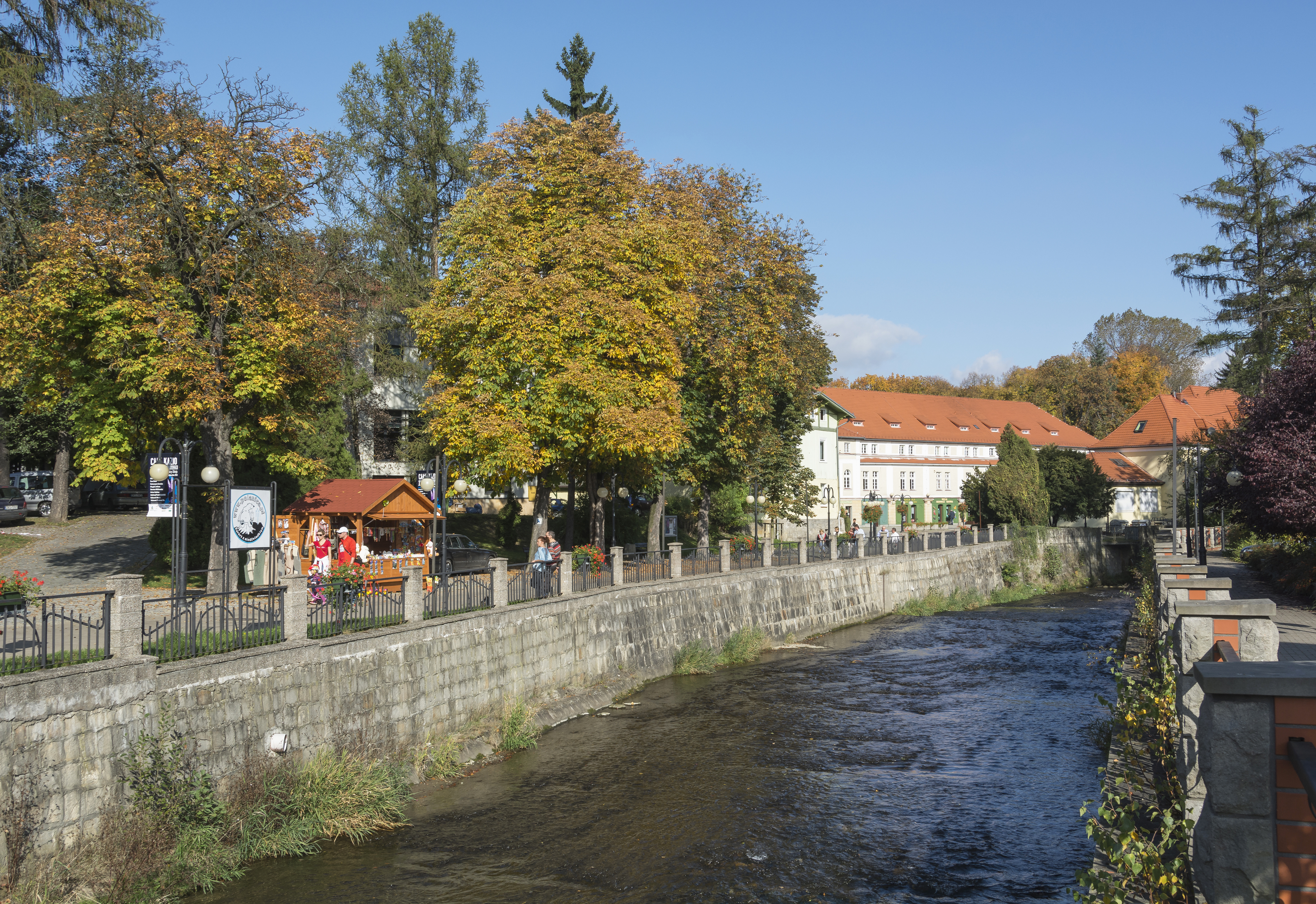
Bystrzyca Dusznicka River in the town centre

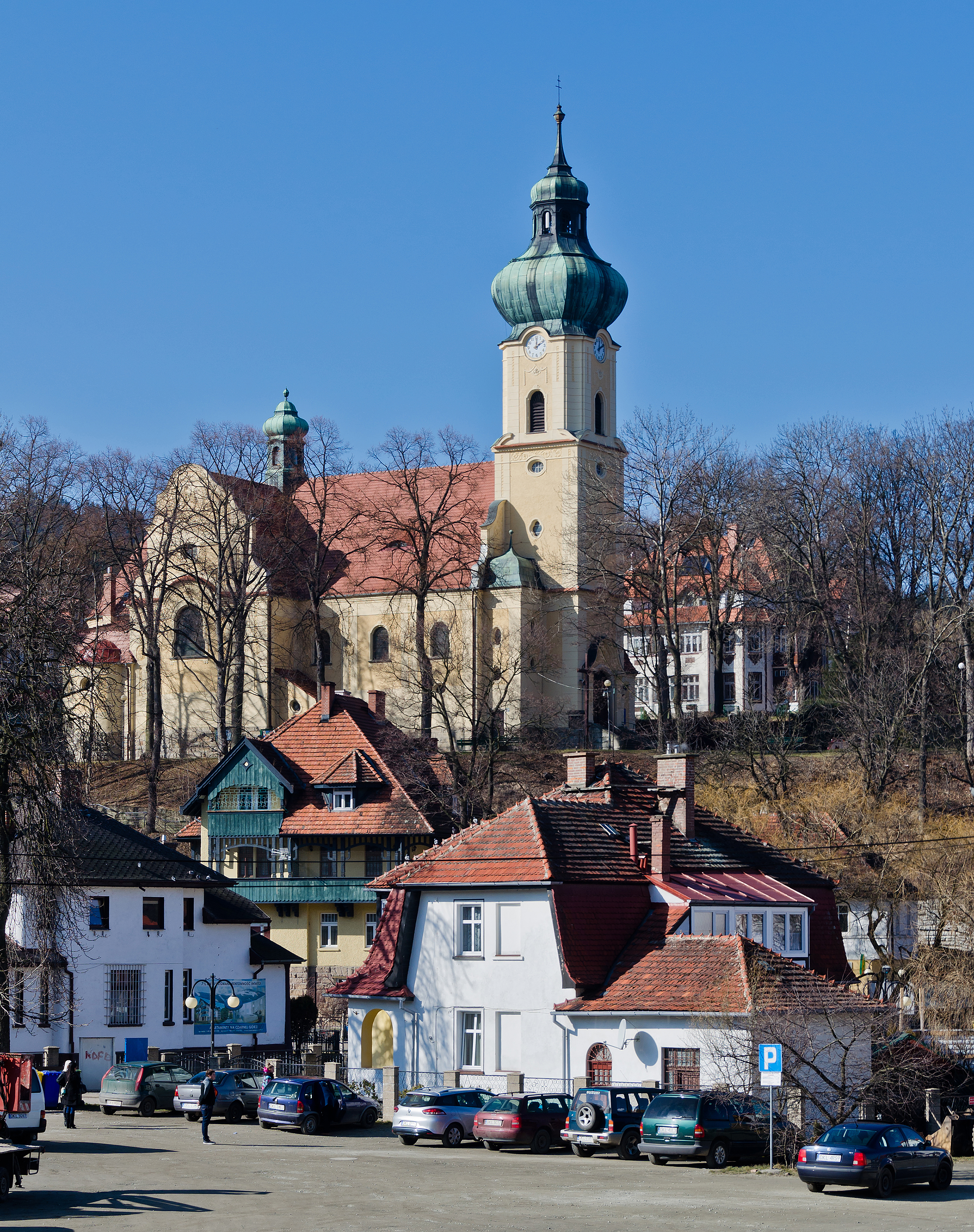
Church of the Assumption

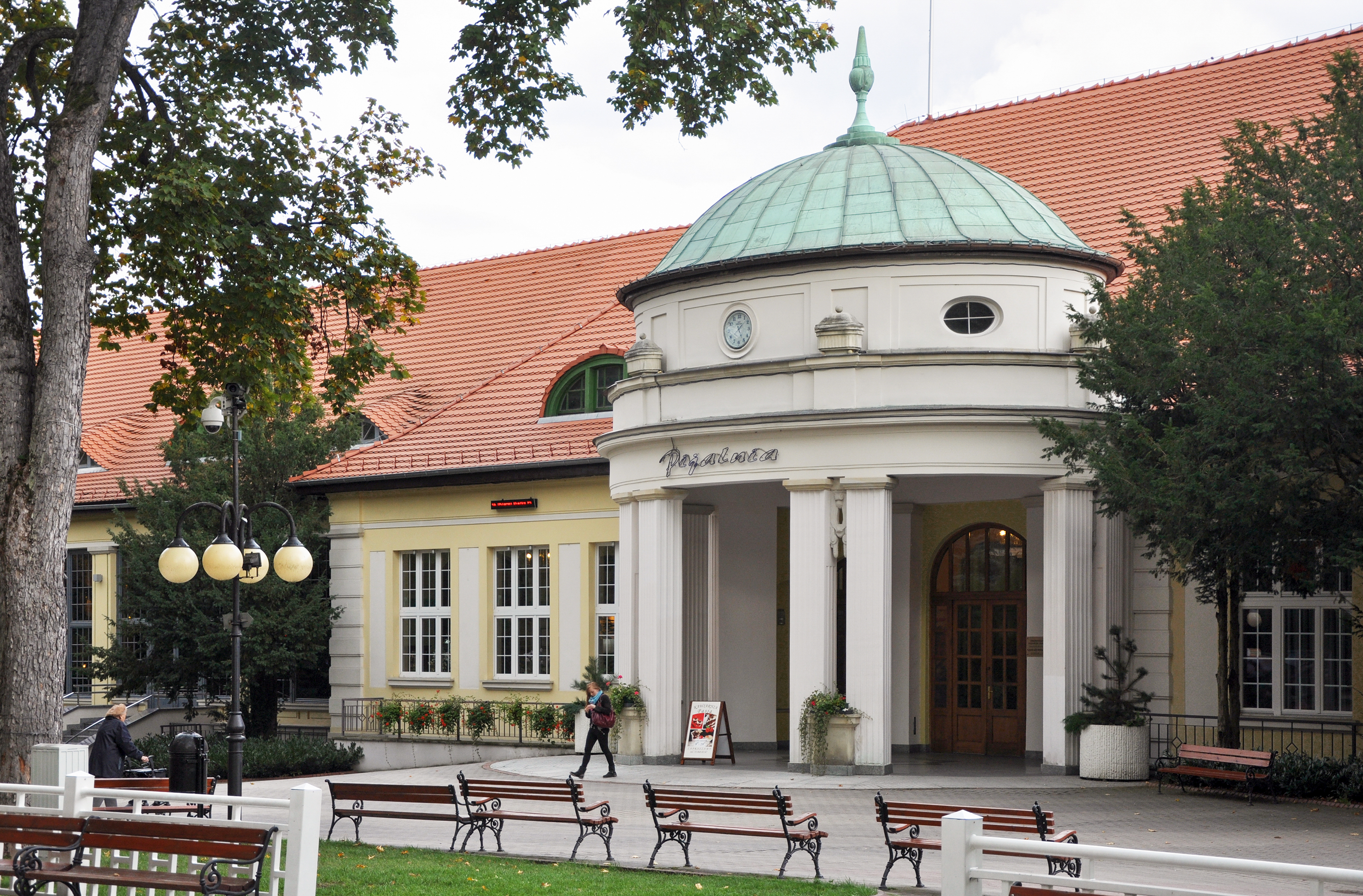
The Drinking House in Polanica-Zdrój

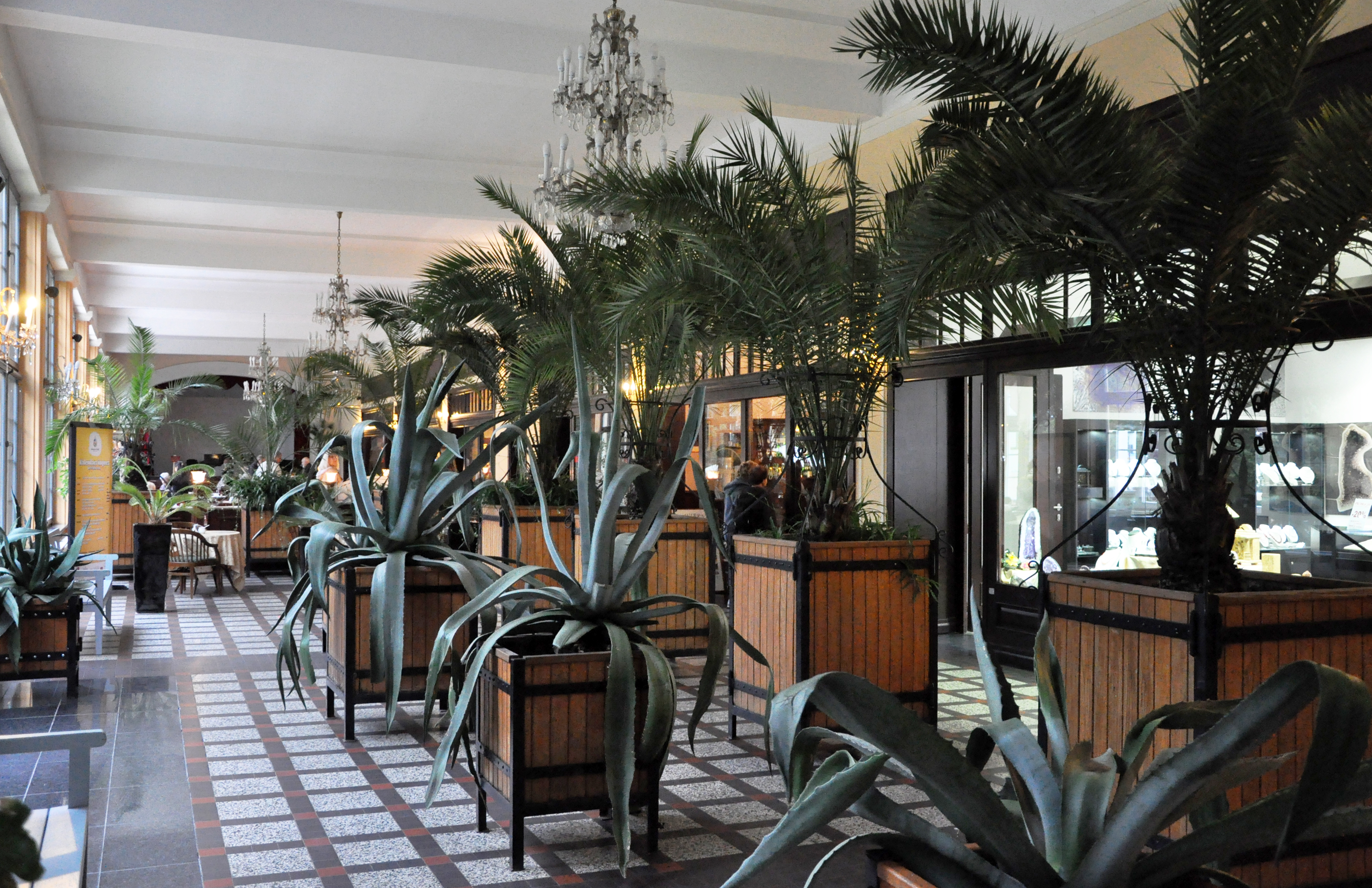
Interior of the Drinking Room

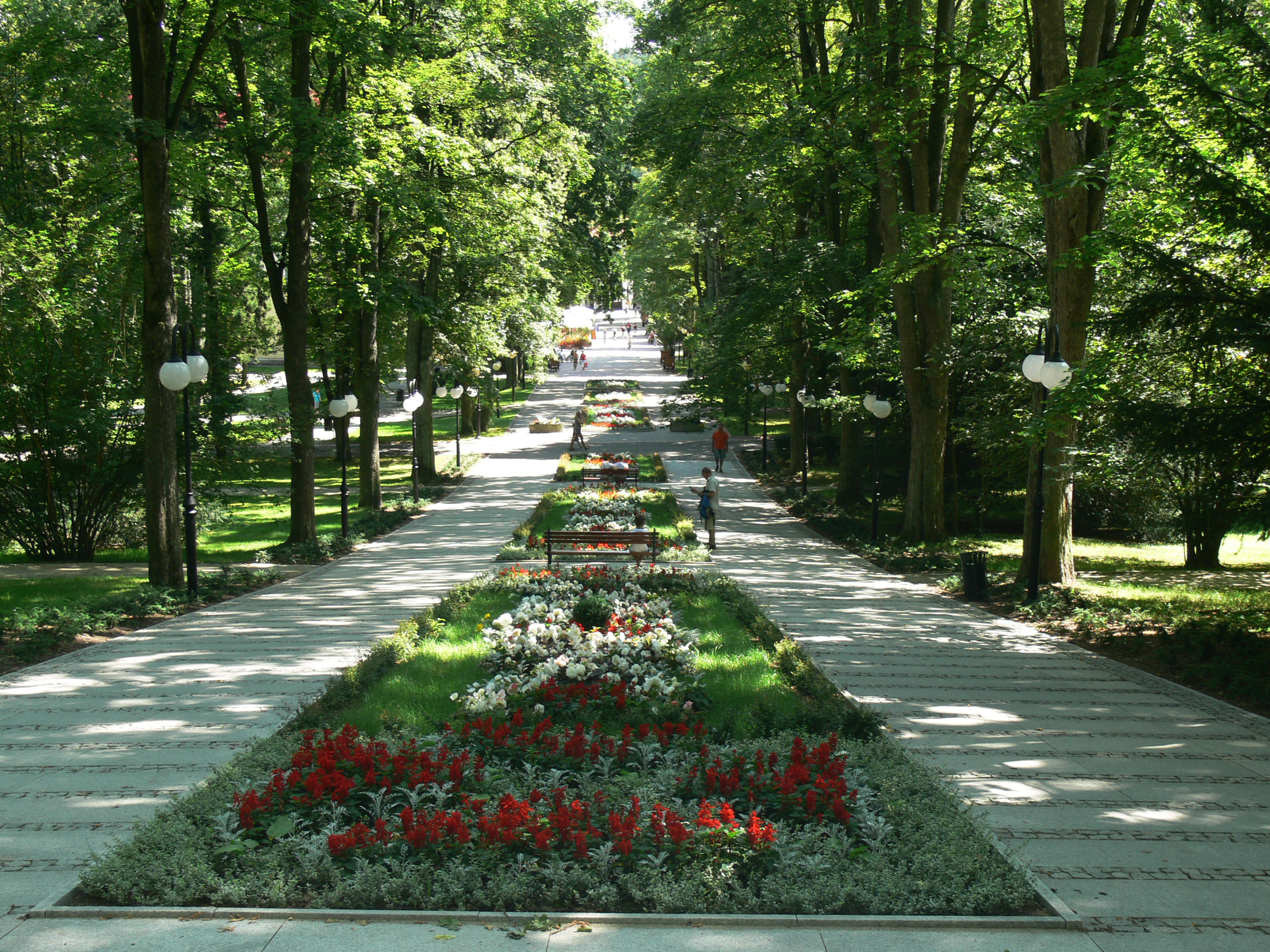
The Spa Park

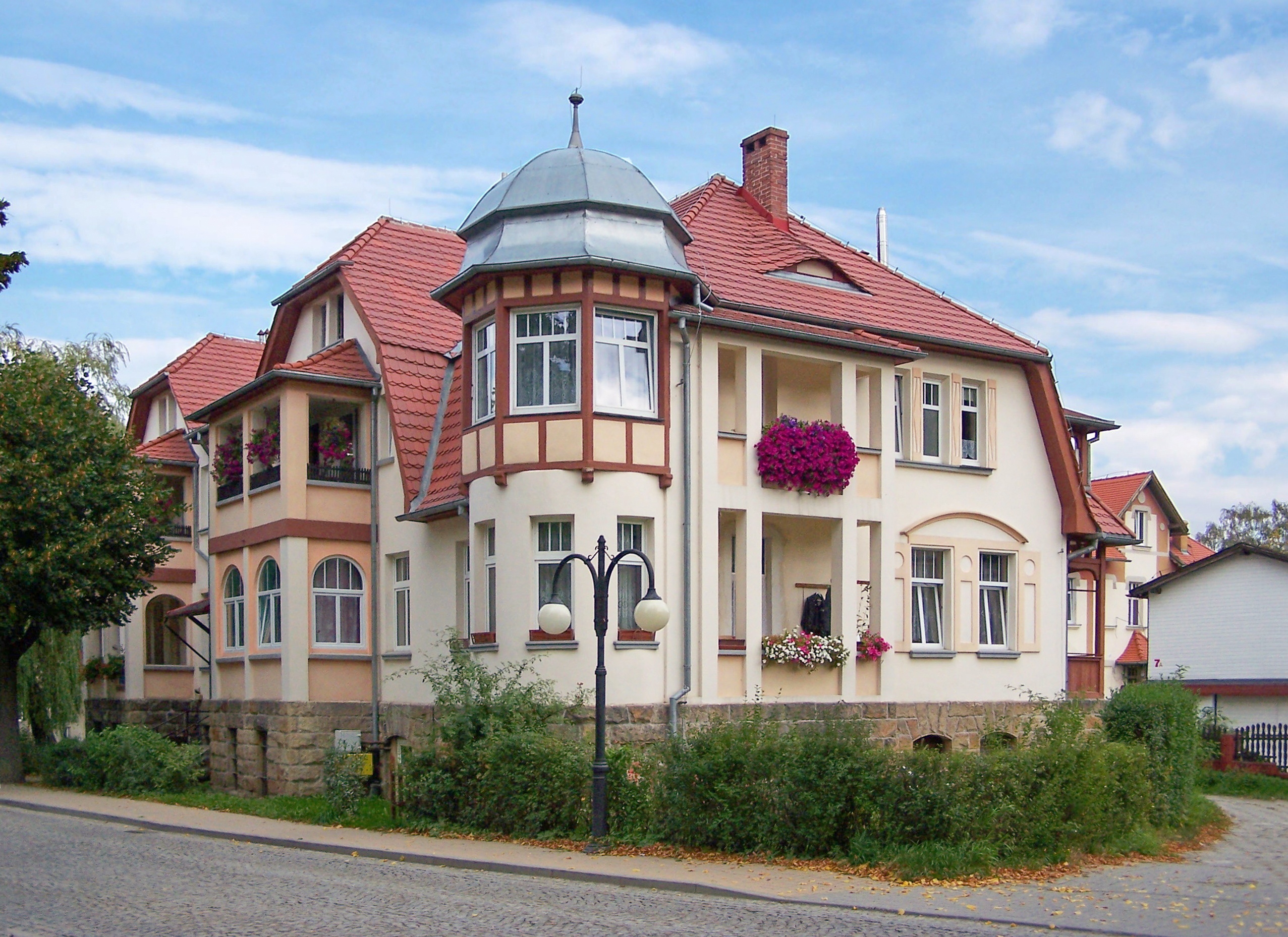
Polanica-Zdrój villa

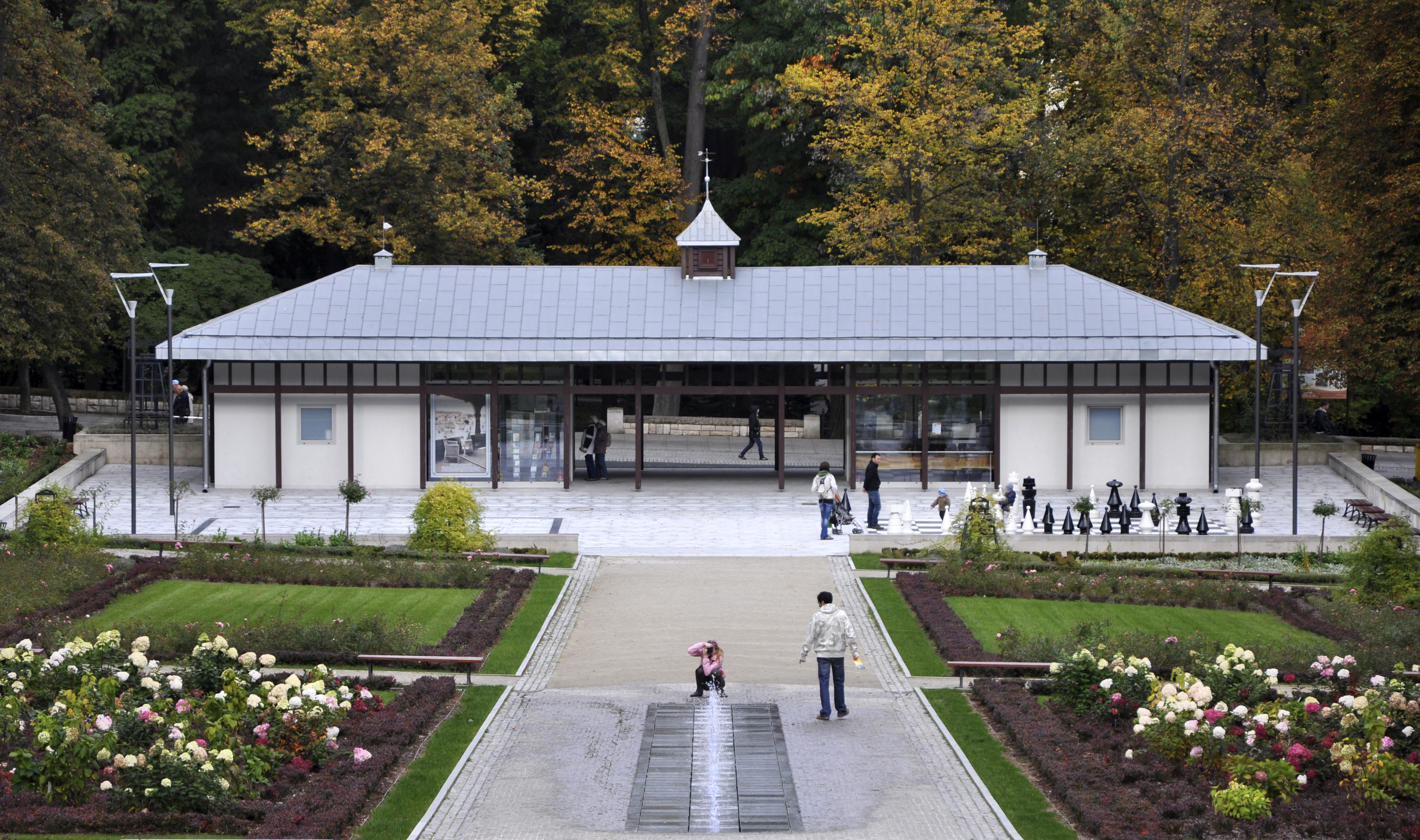
The Chess Pavilion

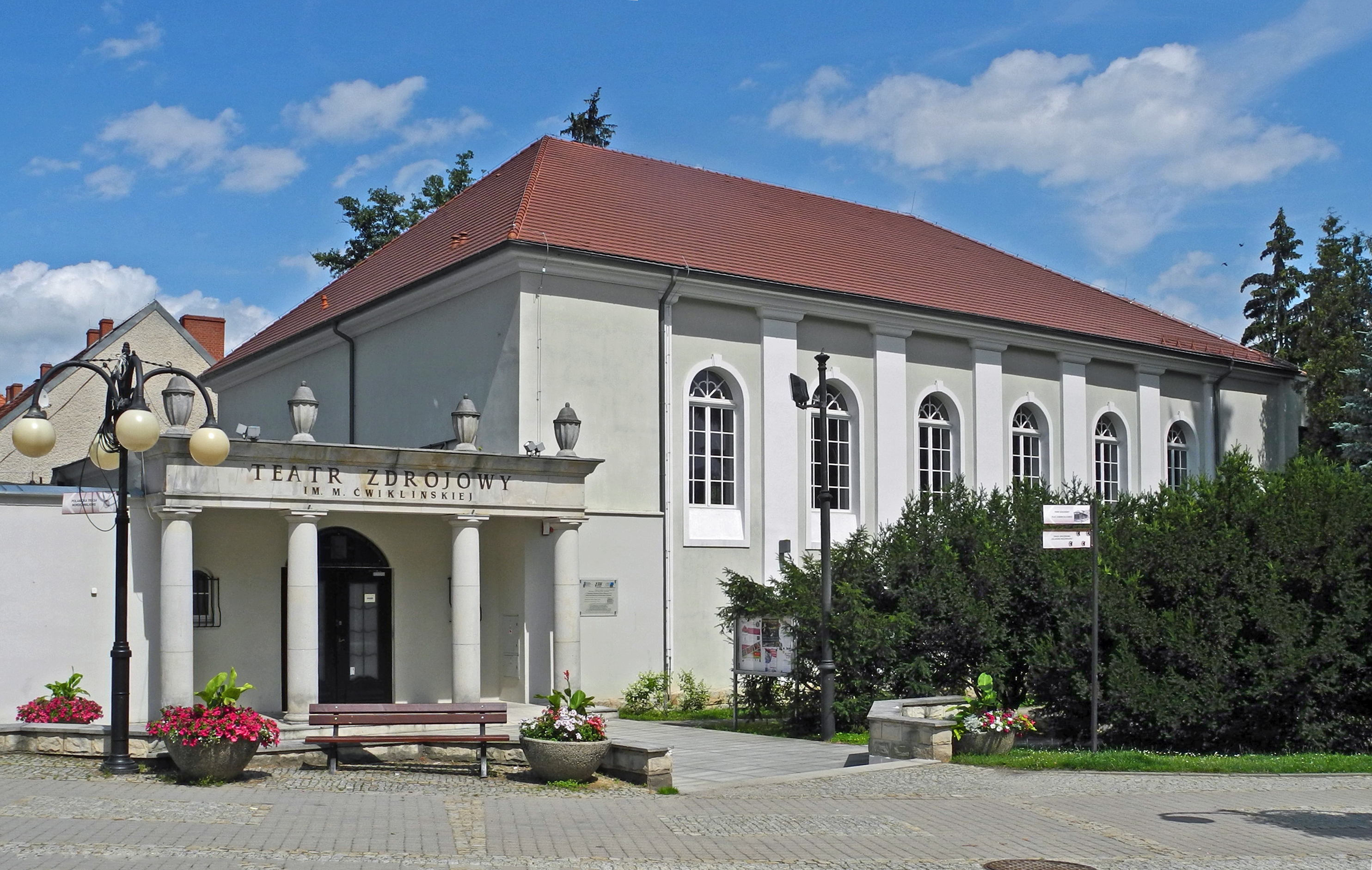
Mieczysława Ćwiklińska Theatre

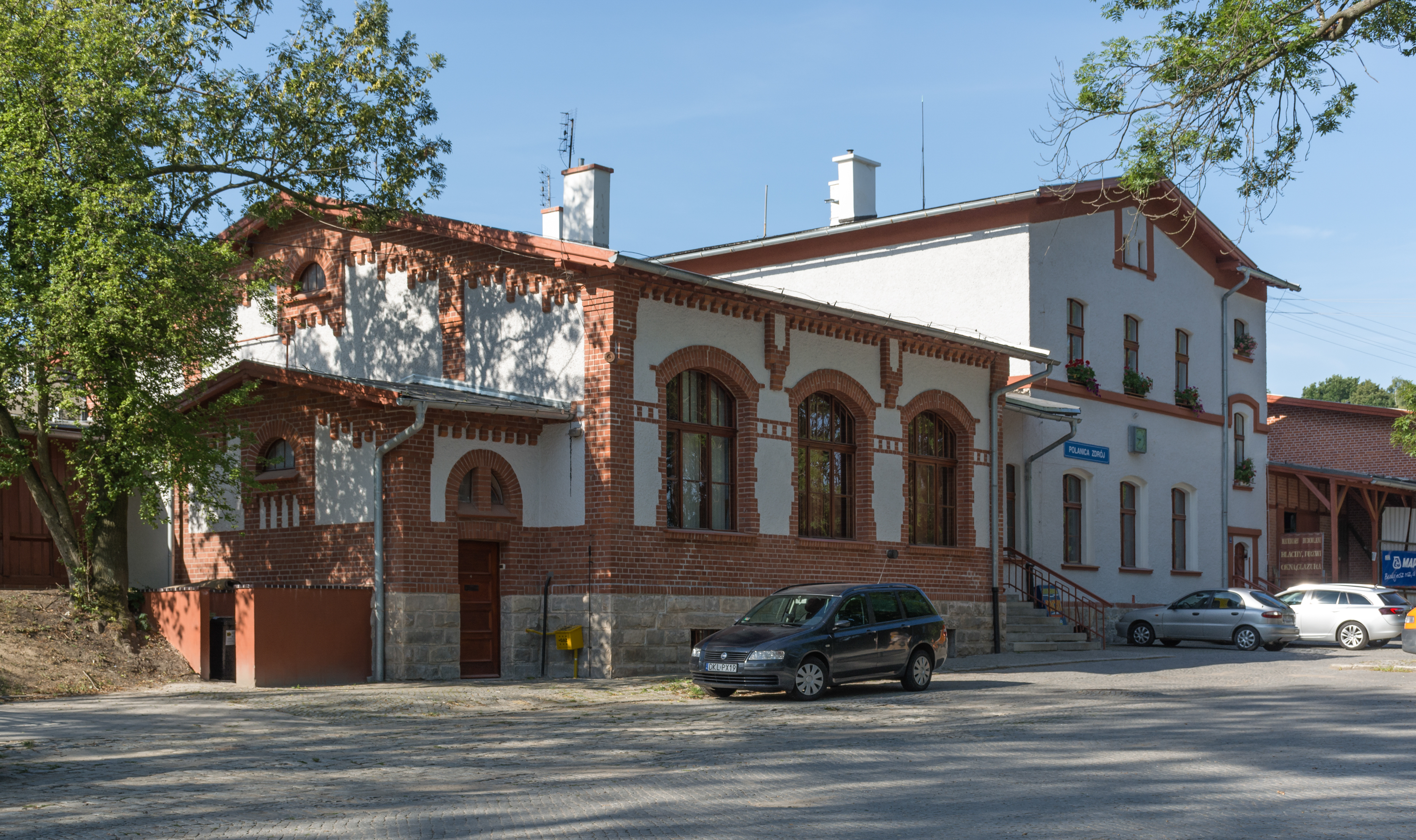
The Railway Station

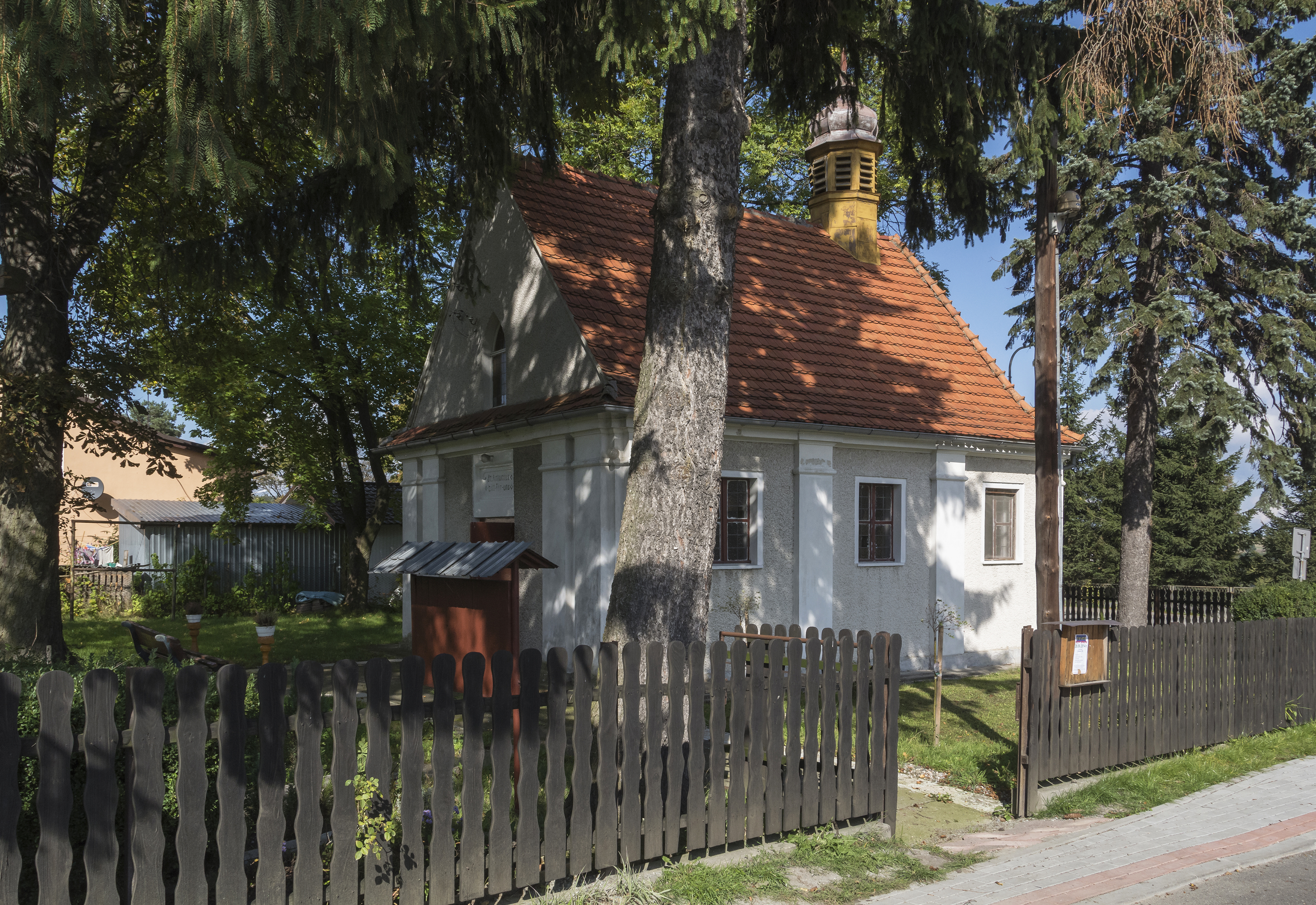
St. Anthony's Chapel, 18th century

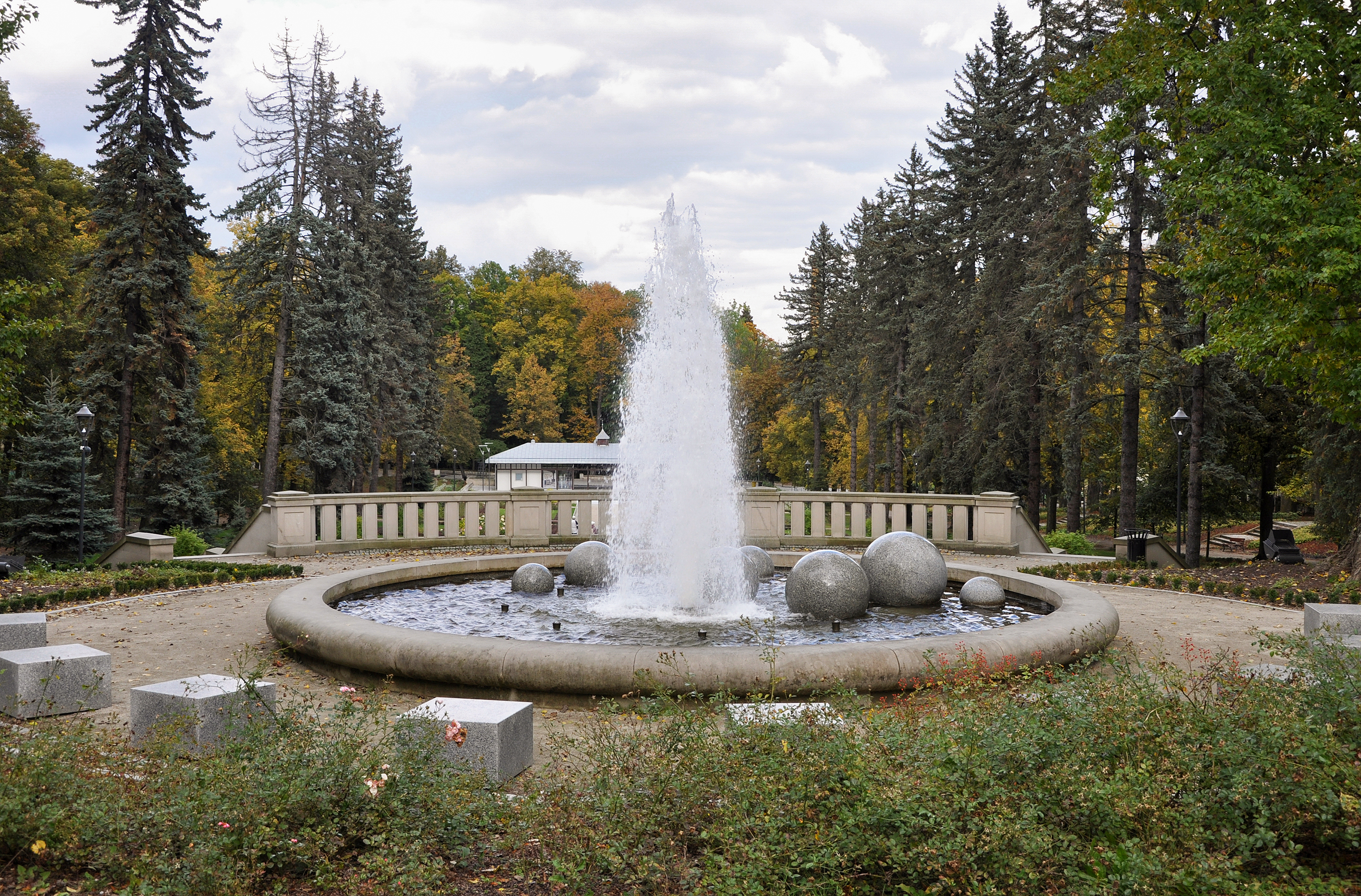
A fountain in the park

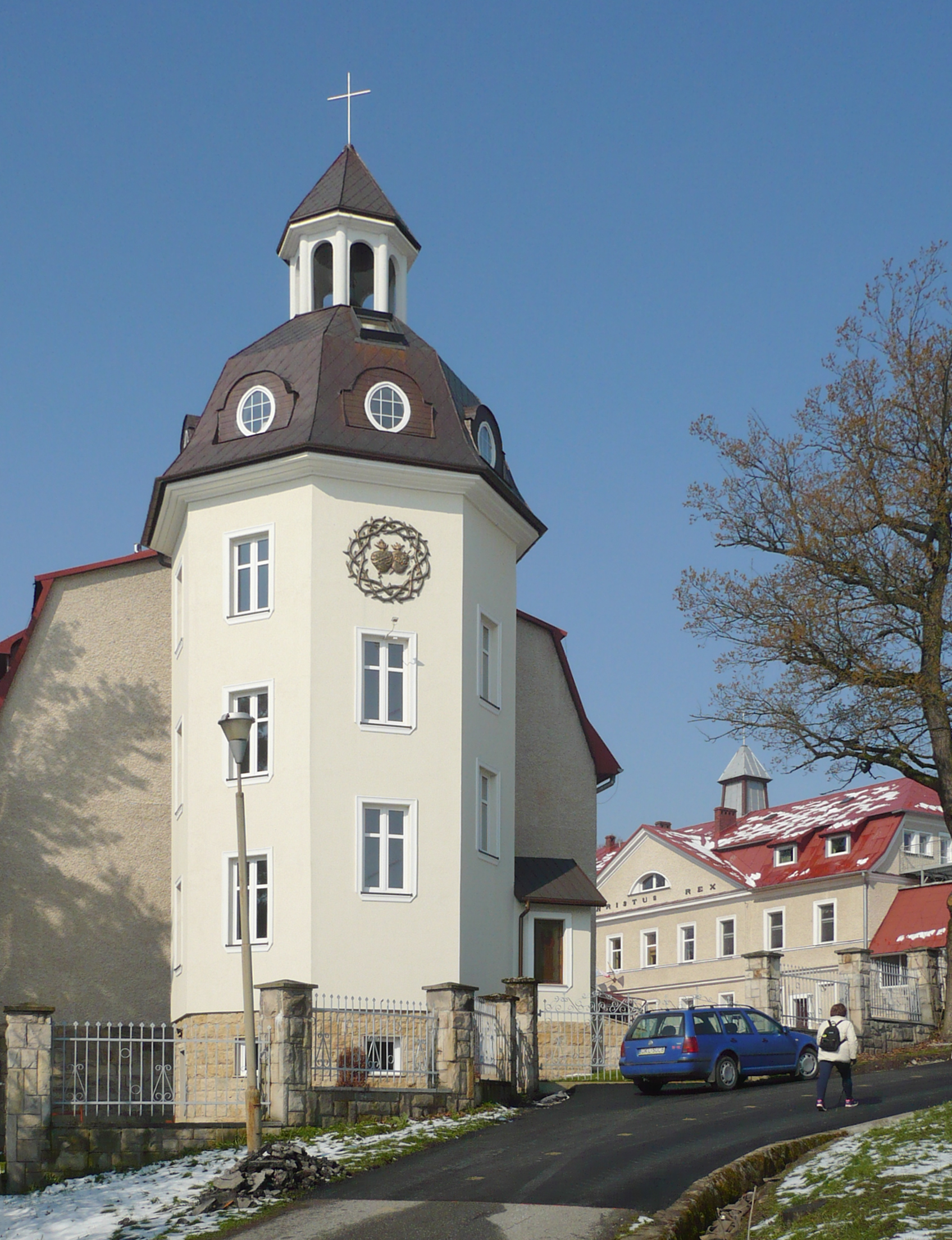
Sokołówka Monastery

== See also ==
- List of spa towns in Poland
