= Women's World Chess Championship 2006 =

Chess tournament in Ekaterinburg, Russia

The Women's World Chess Championship 2006 took place from March 10–27, 2006 in Ekaterinburg, Russia. For the fourth time, the championship took the form of a 64-player knock-out tournament.

The tournament was won by Xu Yuhua, who beat Alisa Galliamova in the final by 2½ to ½. Notably, Xu Yuhua was three months pregnant at the time.

== Participants ==
The players were seeded by their FIDE Elo ratings of January 2006, except that defending champion Antoaneta Stefanova was the no. 1 seed.

1. Antoaneta Stefanova (BUL), 2499, GM (WC)
2. Humpy Koneru (IND), 2537, GM (WC)
3. Pia Cramling (SWE), 2515, GM (E04)
4. Alexandra Kosteniuk (RUS), 2514, GM (R)
5. Maia Chiburdanidze (GEO), 2511, GM (WC)
6. Xu Yuhua (CHN), 2502, WGM (R)
7. Kateryna Lahno (UKR), 2500, IM (E05)
8. Zhu Chen (CHN), 2482, GM (R)
9. Nadezhda Kosintseva (RUS), 2480, IM (E05)
10. Subbaraman Vijayalakshmi (IND), 2479, IM (Z3.2)
11. Tatiana Kosintseva (RUS), 2479, IM (E04)
12. Monika Soćko (POL), 2475, IM (E04)
13. Viktorija Čmilytė (LTU), 2475, IM (E05)
14. Zhao Xue (CHN), 2473, WGM (R)
15. Qin Kanying (CHN), 2469, WGM (Z3.5)
16. Alisa Galliamova (RUS), 2467, IM (R)
17. Yelena Dembo (GRE), 2461, IM (E05)
18. Almira Skripchenko (FRA), 2461, IM (E05)
19. Ekaterina Kovalevskaya (RUS), 2458, IM (WC)
20. Lilit Mkrtchian (ARM), 2453, IM (E05)
21. Nana Dzagnidze (GEO), 2452, IM (E04)
22. Irina Krush (USA), 2447, IM (Z2.1)
23. Lela Javakhishvili (GEO), 2444, IM (E05)
24. Natalia Zhukova (UKR), 2432, WGM (E04)
25. Nino Khurtsidze (GEO), 2430, IM (E05)
26. Svetlana Matveeva (RUS), 2428, IM (E05)
27. Ekaterina Korbut (RUS), 2427, WGM (J04)
28. Ketevan Arakhamia-Grant (GEO), 2426, IM (E04)
29. Elina Danielian (ARM), 2423, IM (E05)
30. Elisabeth Pähtz (GER), 2422, IM (J05)
31. Elena Zaiatz (RUS), 2422, IM (E05)
32. Iweta Radziewicz (POL), 2421, IM (E05)
33. Tatiana Kononenko (UKR), 2417, WGM (E05)
34. Marie Sebag (FRA), 2415, IM (E05)
35. Peng Zhaoqin (NED), 2407, GM (E04)
36. Cristina Adela Foișor (ROM), 2402, IM (E04)
37. Marta Zielińska (POL), 2398, WGM (E05)
38. Anna Ushenina (UKR), 2398, WGM (E05)
39. Irina Vasilevich (RUS), 2386, IM (E05)
40. Wang Yu (CHN), 2385, WGM (AS)
41. Shen Yang (CHN), 2380 (Z3.5)
42. Irina Slavina-Turova (RUS), 2379, IM (E04)
43. Claudia Amura (ARG), 2366, WGM (AM)
44. Evgenija Ovod (RUS), 2366, IM (E05)
45. Ruan Lufei (CHN), 2361 (Z3.5)
46. Sulennis Piña (CUB), 2358, WGM (AM)
47. Jovanka Houska (ENG), 2355, IM (E04)
48. Carolina Luján (ARG), 2346, WGM (Z2.5)
49. Maka Purtseladze (GEO), 2341, IM (E05)
50. Dana Aketayeva (KAZ), 2330, WIM (Z3.4)
51. Maria Kursova (RUS), 2319, WIM (PN)
52. Atousa Pourkashiyan (IRI), 2319, WIM (Z3.1)
53. Ju Wenjun (CHN), 2290 (AS)
54. Subbaraman Meenakshi (IND), 2289, WGM (AS)
55. Irina Berezina-Feldman (AUS), 2285, IM (Z3.6)
56. Hou Yifan (CHN), 2269, WFM (Z3.5)
57. Maritza Arribas (CUB), 2269, WGM (Z2.3)
58. Karen Zapata (PER), 2218, WIM (Z2.4)
59. Hoàng Xuân Thanh Khiết (VIE), 2196, WIM (Z3.3)
60. Ingris Rivera (COL), 2128 (AM)
61. Natalia Khoudgarian (CAN), 2106, WIM (Z2.2)
62. Faridah Basta Sohair (EGY), 2083, WIM (AF)
63. Tuduetso Sabure (BOT), 2072, WGM (AF)
64. Amina Mezioud (ALG), 1978 (Z4.1)

Only two players from the top 20 were absent: Judit Polgár (ranked the no. 1 woman in the world – and 14th overall) who instead took part in the open championship events of 2005 and 2007, as well as Hoang Thanh Trang (ranked 11th).

=== Qualification paths ===
- WC: Women's World Champion, runner-up and semifinalists of Women's World Chess Championship 2004 (4)
- J04 and J05: World Junior Champions 2004 and 2005
- R: Rating (average of all published ratings from July 2004 to January 2005 was used) (5)
- E04 and E05: European Individual Championships 2004 and 2005 (29)
- AM: American Continental Chess Championship 2005 (3)
- AS: Asian Chess Championship 2004 (3)
- AF: African Chess Championship 2005 (2)
- Z2.1, Z2.2, Z2.3, Z2.4, Z2.5, Z3.1, Z3.2, Z3.3, Z3.4, Z3.5 (4), Z3.6, Z4.1: Zonal tournaments
- PN: FIDE President nominee

== Results ==
=== Final match ===
A fourth game was not played because Xu Yuhua led by two points after game three.

Women's World Chess Championship Final 2006
	1	2	3	4	Total
Alisa Galliamova (Russia)	0	½	0	—	½
Xu Yuhua (China)	1	½	1	—	2½

=== Bracket ===
1st Round
44	Evgenija Ovod	2
21	Nana Dzagnidze	4
12	Monika Soćko	½
53	Ju Wenjun	1½
60	Ingris Rivera	½
5	Maia Chiburdanidze	1½
28	Ketevan Arakhamia-Grant	2½
37	Marta Zielińska	1½
36	Cristina Adela Foișor	1½
29	Elina Danielian	2½
4	Alexandra Kosteniuk	2
61	Natalia Khoudgarian	0
52	Atousa Pourkashiyan	½
13	Viktorija Čmilytė	1½
20	Lilit Mkrtchian	1½
45	Ruan Lufei	2½
48	Carolina Lujan	1½
17	Yelena Dembo	½
16	Alisa Galliamova	1½
49	Maka Purtseladze	½
64	Amina Mezioud	½
1	Antoaneta Stefanova	1½
32	Iweta Radziewicz	2
33	Tatiana Kononenko	0
40	Wang Yu	1½
25	Nino Khurtsidze	2½
8	Zhu Chen	0
57	Maritza Arribas	2
56	Hou Yifan	1½
9	Nadezhda Kosintseva	½
24	Natalia Zhukova	3½
41	Shen Yang	2½
42	Irina Slavina-Turova	½
23	Lela Javakhishvili	1½
10	Subbaraman Vijayalakshmi	1½
55	Irina Berezina-Feldman	½
58	Karen Zapata	1½
7	Kateryna Lagno	½
26	Svetlana Matveeva	2
39	Irina Vasilevich	0
34	Marie Sebag	1½
31	Elena Zaiatz	½
2	Humpy Koneru	2
63	Tuduetso Sabure	0
50	Dana Aketayeva	½
15	Qin Kanying	1½
18	Almira Skripchenko	½
47	Jovanka Houska	1½
46	Sulennis Piña	½
19	Ekaterina Kovalevskaya	1½
14	Zhao Xue	½
51	Maria Kursova	1½
62	Faridah Basta Sohair	0
3	Pia Cramling	2
30	Elisabeth Pähtz	2
35	Peng Zhaoqin	4
38	Anna Ushenina	3
27	Ekaterina Korbut	1
6	Xu Yuhua	1½
59	Hoàng Xuân Thanh Khiết	½
54	Subbaraman Meenakshi	0
11	Tatiana Kosintseva	2
22	Irina Krush	2½
43	Claudia Amura	1½

2nd Round
21	Nana Dzagnidze	1½
53	Ju Wenjun	2½
5	Maia Chiburdanidze	1½
28	Ketevan Arakhamia-Grant	½
29	Elina Danielian	0
4	Alexandra Kosteniuk	2
13	Viktorija Čmilytė	4
45	Ruan Lufei	2
48	Carolina Lujan	1
16	Alisa Galliamova	3
1	Antoaneta Stefanova	1
32	Iweta Radziewicz	3
25	Nino Khurtsidze	1½
57	Maritza Arribas	½
56	Hou Yifan	2
24	Natalia Zhukova	0
23	Lela Javakhishvili	1
10	Subbaraman Vijayalakshmi	3
58	Karen Zapata	½
26	Svetlana Matveeva	1½
34	Marie Sebag	3
2	Humpy Koneru	1
15	Qin Kanying	2½
47	Jovanka Houska	1½
19	Ekaterina Kovalevskaya	1½
51	Maria Kursova	½
3	Pia Cramling	½
35	Peng Zhaoqin	1½
38	Anna Ushenina	½
6	Xu Yuhua	1½
11	Tatiana Kosintseva	1½
22	Irina Krush	½

3rd Round
53	Ju Wenjun	2
5	Maia Chiburdanidze	4
4	Alexandra Kosteniuk	½
13	Viktorija Čmilytė	1½
16	Alisa Galliamova	2½
32	Iweta Radziewicz	1½
25	Nino Khurtsidze	2
56	Hou Yifan	0
10	Subbaraman Vijayalakshmi	½
26	Svetlana Matveeva	1½
34	Marie Sebag	4
15	Qin Kanying	2
19	Ekaterina Kovalevskaya	2½
35	Peng Zhaoqin	1½
6	Xu Yuhua	1½
11	Tatiana Kosintseva	1

Quarterfinals
5	Maia Chiburdanidze	1
13	Viktorija Čmilytė	3
16	Alisa Galliamova	2
25	Nino Khurtsidze	0
26	Svetlana Matveeva	1½
34	Marie Sebag	½
19	Ekaterina Kovalevskaya	1½
6	Xu Yuhua	2½

Semifinals
14	(Lithuania) Viktorija Čmilytė	½
16	(Russia) Alisa Galliamova	1½
26	(Russia) Svetlana Matveeva	½
6	(China) Xu Yuhua	1½

Finals
16	(Russia) Alisa Galliamova	½
6	(China) Xu Yuhua	2½
