= Women's World Chess Championship 2012 =

International chess competition

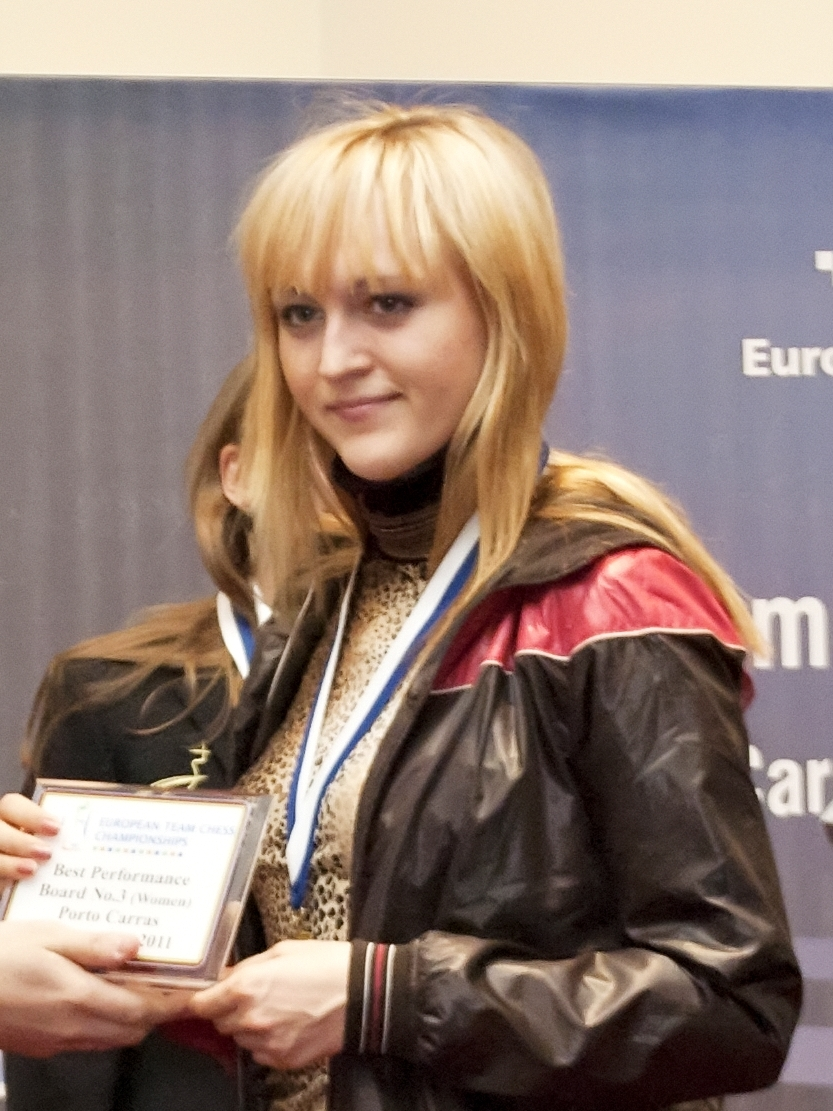
- Anna Ushenina, winner of the 2012 championship.
- Venue: Yugra Chess Academy
- Location: Khanty Mansiysk, Russia
- Dates: 10 November – 1 December 2012
- Competitors: 64

Champion
- (Ukraine) Anna Ushenina

The Women's World Chess Championship 2012 was a knockout tournament, to decide the women's world champion. The title was won by Anna Ushenina of Ukraine for the first time. Defending champion Hou Yifan went out in the second round.

The tournament was played as a 64-player knockout type in Khanty Mansiysk, Russia, from 10 November to 1 December 2012. Each pairing consisted of two games, and tie-breaks at faster time controls, if necessary.

After only two wins by lower-rated players in the first round, the second round saw the top three seeds all going out to players rated 150 Elo points below them. Of those, third seed Anna Muzychuk lost to the eventual world champion. The fourth seed went out in the quarter-final. The final consisted of four games at classical time control, followed by tie-break games; in it, Anna Ushenina beat former women's world champion Antoaneta Stefanova in the first set of tie-breaks. The unexpected final of two lower-seeded players led to questions regarding whether a single-match knock-out system is the best way to determine the world champion.

Ushenina lost her title in the Women's World Chess Championship 2013, after game seven of a ten-game match against Hou Yifan, winner of the FIDE Women's Grand Prix 2011–2012.

== Participants ==
Players qualified for the tournament through the previous world championship, the FIDE rating list, continental championships, and two FIDE president nominees. Players were seeded by their Elo ratings (November 2012 list), except that defending champion Hou Yifan was the no. 1 seed.

1. Hou Yifan (China), 2606, GM (WC)
2. Humpy Koneru (India), 2610, GM (WC)
3. Anna Muzychuk (Slovenia), 2586, GM (J10)
4. Zhao Xue (China), 2565, GM (WC)
5. Kateryna Lahno (Ukraine), 2553, GM (E11)
6. Nadezhda Kosintseva (Russia), 2539, GM (E10)
7. Viktorija Čmilytė (Lithuania), 2524, GM (E10)
8. Marie Sebag (France), 2521, GM (E10)
9. Valentina Gunina (Russia), 2517, IM (R)
10. Pia Cramling (Sweden), 2516, GM (E10)
11. Tatiana Kosintseva (Russia), 2515, GM (E10)
12. Dronavalli Harika (India), 2512, GM (AS11)
13. Bela Khotenashvili (Georgia), 2504, IM (E11)
14. Alexandra Kosteniuk (Russia), 2501, GM (R)
15. Ju Wenjun (China), 2501, WGM (Z3.5)
16. Antoaneta Stefanova (Bulgaria), 2491, GM (E10)
17. Zhu Chen (Qatar), 2491, GM (R)
18. Anna Zatonskih (United States), 2489, IM (Z2.1)
19. Natalia Pogonina (Russia), 2478, WGM (E11)
20. Mariya Muzychuk (Ukraine), 2476, IM (E10)
21. Elina Danielian (Armenia), 2476, GM (E11)
22. Hoang Thanh Trang (HUN), 2470, GM (E11)
23. Irina Krush (United States), 2470, IM (Z2.1)
24. Alisa Galliamova (Russia), 2468, IM (R)
25. Olga Girya (Russia), 2467, WGM (PN)
26. Huang Qian (China), 2465, WGM (Z3.5)
27. Lilit Mkrtchian (Armenia), 2457, IM (E11)
28. Lela Javakhishvili (Georgia), 2455, IM (E11)
29. Yelena Dembo (Greece), 2454, IM (E10)
30. Anna Ushenina (Ukraine), 2452, IM (R)
31. Natalia Zhukova (Ukraine), 2451, GM (E10)
32. Monika Soćko (Poland), 2445, GM (E10)
33. Almira Skripchenko (France), 2441, IM (R)
34. Guo Qi (China), 2432, WGM (PN)
35. Deysi Cori (Peru), 2429, WGM (J11)
36. Nino Khurtsidze (Georgia), 2428, IM (E10)
37. Anastasia Bodnaruk (Russia), 2415, IM (E11)
38. Ketevan Arakhamia-Grant (Scotland), 2414, GM (E11)
39. Shen Yang (China), 2413, WGM (Z3.5)
40. Iweta Rajlich (Poland), 2410, IM (E10)
41. Ekaterina Kovalevskaya (Russia), 2409, IM (E10)
42. Li Ruofan (SIN), 2394, IM (Z3.3)
43. Evgenija Ovod (Russia), 2384, IM (E11)
44. Sopiko Khukhashvili (Georgia), 2383, IM (E11)
45. Cristina Adela Foișor (Romania), 2383, IM (E11)
46. Svetlana Matveeva (Russia), 2377, IM (E11)
47. Carolina Lujan (Argentina), 2369, IM (Z2.5)
48. Nastassia Ziaziulkina (Belarus), 2367, WGM (E10)
49. Marina Romanko (Russia), 2355, IM (E11)
50. Atousa Pourkashiyan (Iran), 2321, WGM (AS10)
51. Tatev Abrahamyan (United States), 2304, WGM (Z2.1)
52. Maritza Arribas Robaina (Cuba), 2273, WGM (AM)
53. Soumya Swaminathan (India), 2251, WGM (Z3.7)
54. Madina Davletbayeva (Kazakhstan), 2220, WIM (Z3.4)
55. Shayesteh Ghader Pour (Iran), 2219, WIM (Z3.1)
56. Gu Xiaobing (China), 2209, WGM (Z3.5)
57. Irina Berezina (Australia), 2190, IM (Z3.6)
58. Ingrid Aliaga Fernández (Peru), 2175, WFM (Z2.4)
59. Melissa Castrillón Gómez (Colombia), 2159, WIM (Z2.3)
60. Mona Khaled (Egypt), 2155, WGM (AF)
61. Natalia Khoudgarian (Canada), 2138, WIM (Z2.2)
62. Amina Mezioud (Algeria), 2055, WIM (AF)
63. Denise Frick (South Africa), 1871, WIM (AF)
64. S D Ranasinghe (Sri Lanka), 1821, WIM (Z3.2)

=== Qualification paths ===
- WC: Women's World Champion, runner-up of Women's World Chess Championship 2011, semifinalist of Women's World Chess Championship 2010
- J10 and J11: World Junior Champions 2010 and 2011
- R: Rating (average of all published ratings from July 2011 to January 2012 was used) (6)
- E10 and E11: European Individual Championships 2010 and 2011 (28)
- AM: American Continental Chess Championship 2011
- AS10 and AS11: Asian Chess Championships 2010 and 2011
- AF: African Chess Championship 2011 (3)
- Z2.1 (3), Z2.2, Z2.3, Z2.4, Z2.5, Z3.1, Z3.2, Z3.3, Z3.4, Z3.5 (4), Z3.6, Z3.7: Zonal tournaments
- PN: FIDE President nominee (2)

=== Notable non-participants ===
The number one woman in the world, Judit Polgár, has never competed for the women's title and did not enter this time either. Other notable absentees were: women's number six Nana Dzagnidze, 2010 finalist Ruan Lufei, and ex-champion Maia Chiburdanidze (inactive).

== Format ==
Each pairing consisted of two games played over two days, one with White and one with Black. The time controls in the classical games were 90 minutes for the first 40 moves with a 30-minute addition on move 41. In case of a tie, tiebreaks were played the next day. The format for the tie breaks was as follows:

- Two rapid games (25 minutes plus a 10-second increment) were played.
- If the score was still tied, two rapid games (10 minutes plus a 10-second increment) were played.
- If the match is tied after these two games, the opponents played two blitz games (5 minutes plus a 3-second increment).
- If the score was still tied after a pair of blitz games, a single Armageddon game (White must win; Black only needs to draw) would be played. White had 5 minutes, Black had 4 minutes, and both players had three-second increments beginning with move 61.

== Prize pool ==
The championship had a prize-pool of 450,000 US-Dollar. Prizes were $3,750 for first-round losers, $5,500 for the second round, 8,000 for the third. Losing quarter-finalists picked up $12,000, the semi-finalists $20,000. Stefanova then got $30,000 for finishing runner-up to Ushenina, who got $60,000 in prize money. It was the same distribution as in the 2010 knock-out championship.

== Coverage ==
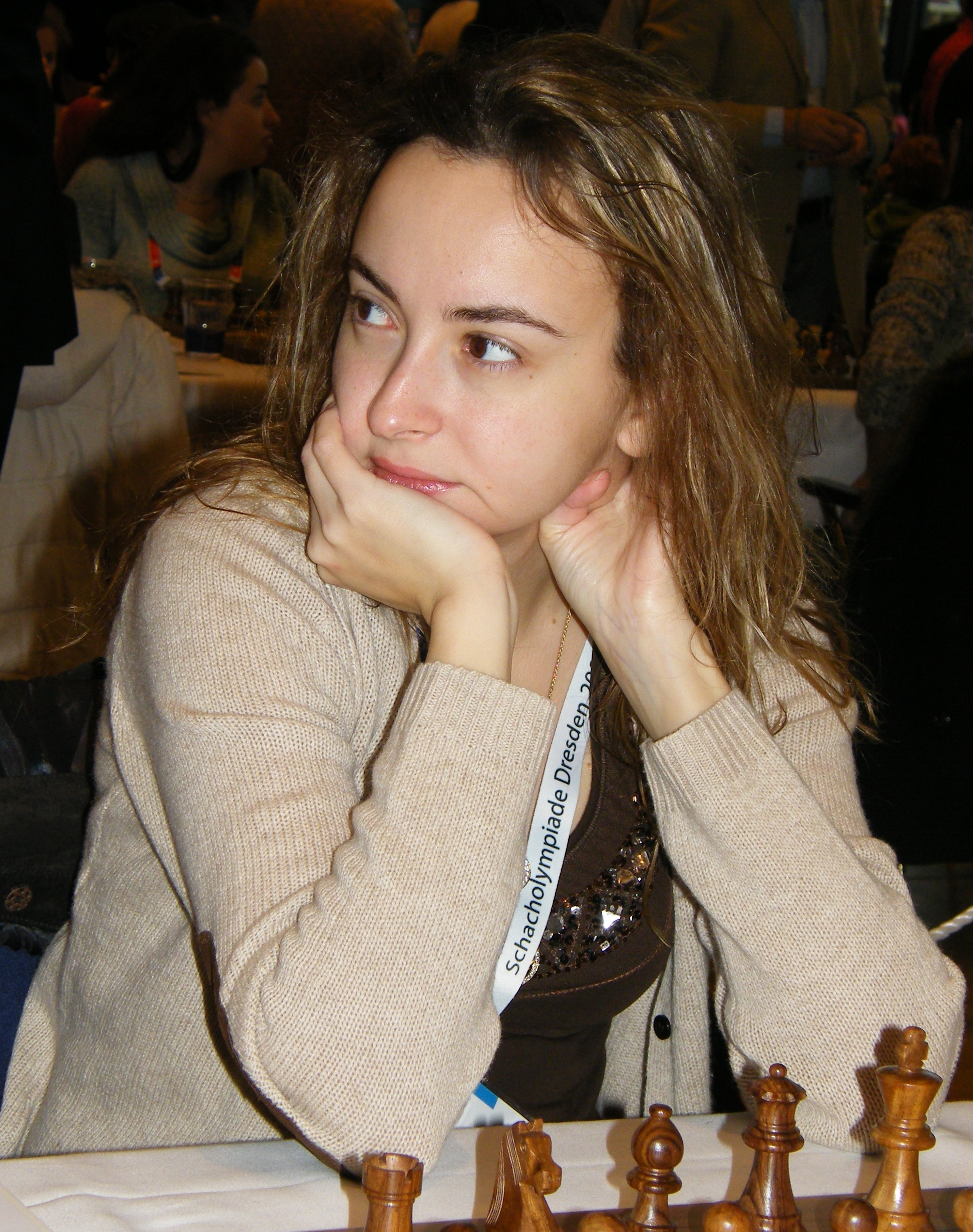
Antoaneta Stefanova, losing finalist

The tournament was streamed on the tournament website each day in full length. Live coverage was interrupted only for advertising breaks. The videostream was also playable on demand until the next day started. Coverage was provided in low and high definition with Grand Master commentary in three languages: English, Russian and for the first time Chinese. In the final days the broadcast was watched by several hundred thousand live viewers.

== Results ==
=== Final match ===
The final match was decided after four matches at classical time controls and two rapid tie-breaks. Anna Ushenina won the title, beating 2004 Women's World Chess champion Stefanova. Stefanova also was the reigning Women's World Rapid champion.

Women's World Chess Championship Final 2012
	Rating	1	2	3	4	R1	R2	Total
Antoaneta Stefanova (Bulgaria)	2491	½	½	0	1	½	0	2½
Anna Ushenina (Ukraine)	2452	½	½	1	0	½	1	3½

=== Bracket ===
First round pairings were published on 1 November 2012.

1st Round
1	(China) Hou Yifan	2
64	(Sri Lanka) S Ranasinghe	0
32	(Poland) M Soćko	1½
33	(France) A Skripchenko	½
16	(Bulgaria) A Stefanova	2
49	(Russia) M Romanko	0
17	(Qatar) Zhu Chen	2
48	(Belarus) N Ziaziulkina	0
8	(France) M Sebag	1½
57	(Australia) I Berezina	½
25	(Russia) O Girya	1½
40	(Poland) I Rajlich	½
9	(Russia) V Gunina	2
56	(China) Gu XB	0
24	(Russia) A Galliamova	3
41	(Russia) E Kovalevskaya	1
4	(China) Zhao Xue	2
61	(Canada) N Khoudgarian	0
29	(Greece) Y Dembo	½
36	(Georgia (country)) N Khurtsidze	1½
13	(Georgia (country)) B Khotenashvili	1½
52	(Cuba) M Arribas R	2½
20	(Ukraine) M Muzychuk	4½
45	(Romania) C A Foișor	4½
5	(Ukraine) K Lahno	2
60	(Egypt) M Khaled	0
28	(Georgia (country)) L Javakhishvili	3½
37	(Russia) A Bodnaruk	2½
12	(India) D Harika	1½
53	(India) S Soumya	½
21	(Armenia) E Danielian	4
44	(Georgia (country)) S Khukhashvili	2
3	(Slovenia) A Muzychuk	2
62	(Algeria) A Mezioud	0
30	(Ukraine) A Ushenina	1½
35	(Peru) D Cori	½
19	(Russia) N Pogonina	3
46	(Russia) S Matveeva	1
14	(Russia) A Kosteniuk	1½
51	(United States) T Abrahamyan	½
6	(Russia) N Kosintseva	2
59	(Colombia) M Castrillón G	0
27	(Armenia) L Mkrtchian	2
38	(Scotland) K Arakhamia-G	0
22	(Hungary) Hoang T T	1½
43	(Russia) E Ovod	½
54	(Kazakhstan) M Davletbayeva	½
11	(Russia) T Kosintseva	1½
7	(Lithuania) V Cmilyte	1½
58	(Peru) I Aliaga F	½
26	(China) Huang Q	1½
39	(China) Shen Yang	½
42	(Singapore) Li Ruofan	3½
23	(United States) I Krush	4½
55	(Iran) S Ghader Pour	0
10	(Sweden) P Cramling	2
15	(China) Ju Wenjun	4
50	(Iran) A Pourkashiyan	2
47	(Argentina) C Lujan	½
18	(United States) A Zatonskih	1½
31	(Ukraine) N Zhukova	1½
34	(China) Guo Qi	½
63	(South Africa) D Frick	0
2	(India) H Koneru	2

2nd Round
1	(China) Hou Yifan	1
32	(Poland) M Soćko	3
16	(Bulgaria) A Stefanova	1½
17	(Qatar) Zhu Chen	½
8	(France) M Sebag	1½
25	(Russia) O Girya	½
9	(Russia) V Gunina	½
24	(Russia) A Galliamova	1½
4	(China) Zhao Xue	2½
36	(Georgia (country)) N Khurtsidze	1½
52	(Cuba) M Arribas R	½
20	(Ukraine) M Muzychuk	1½
5	(Ukraine) K Lahno	½
28	(Georgia (country)) L Javakhishvili	1½
12	(India) D Harika	1½
21	(Armenia) E Danielian	½
3	(Slovenia) A Muzychuk	1
30	(Ukraine) A Ushenina	3
19	(Russia) N Pogonina	1½
14	(Russia) A Kosteniuk	½
6	(Russia) N Kosintseva	3½
27	(Armenia) L Mkrtchian	2½
22	(Hungary) Hoang T T	½
11	(Russia) T Kosintseva	1½
7	(Lithuania) V Čmilytė	½
26	(China) Huang Q	1½
23	(United States) I Krush	3
10	(Sweden) P Cramling	1
15	(China) Ju Wenjun	4
18	(United States) A Zatonskih	2
31	(Ukraine) N Zhukova	2
2	(India) H Koneru	0

3rd Round
32	(Poland) M Soćko	0
16	(Bulgaria) A Stefanova	2
8	(France) M Sebag	2
24	(Russia) A Galliamova	0
4	(China) Zhao Xue	1½
20	(Ukraine) M Muzychuk	½
28	(Georgia (country)) L Javakhishvili	½
12	(India) D Harika	1½
30	(Ukraine) A Ushenina	1½
19	(Russia) N Pogonina	½
6	(Russia) N Kosintseva	3½
11	(Russia) T Kosintseva	2½
26	(China) Huang Q	2½
23	(United States) I Krush	1½
15	(China) Ju Wenjun	2½
31	(Ukraine) N Zhukova	1½

Quarterfinals
16	(Bulgaria) A Stefanova	3
8	(France) M Sebag	1
4	(China) Zhao Xue	1½
12	(India) D Harika	2½
30	(Ukraine) A Ushenina	1½
6	(Russia) N Kosintseva	½
26	(China) Huang Q	2½
15	(China) Ju Wenjun	3½

Semifinals
16	(Bulgaria) A Stefanova	1½
12	(India) D Harika	½
30	(Ukraine) A Ushenina	2½
15	(China) Ju Wenjun	1½

Finals
16	(Bulgaria) A Stefanova	2½
30	(Ukraine) A Ushenina	3½
