= Carolina Luján =

Argentine chess player (born 1985)

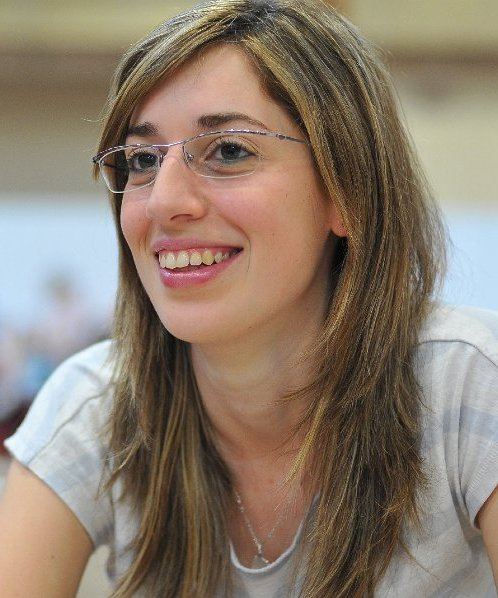
- Carolina Luján at the 40th Chess Olympiad in Istanbul, Turkey 2012

Personal information
- Born: María Carolina Luján; May 13, 1985 (age 41) Buenos Aires, Argentina

Chess career
- Country: Argentina
- Title: International Master (2007); Woman Grandmaster (2005)
- Peak rating: 2419 (October 2006)

María Carolina Luján (born May 13, 1985 in Buenos Aires) is an Argentine chess player holding the FIDE titles of International Master and Woman Grandmaster.

== Career ==
Luján won three gold medals at the Pan American Youth Chess Championships: in the under-10 girls' division in 1995 and in the under-12 girls' in 1996 and 1997.

She has won the Argentine Women's Chess Championship five times (in 2000, 2001, 2004, 2006 and 2015).

Luján competed in the Women's World Chess Championship 2004 where she was eliminated by the eventual runner-up Ekaterina Kovalevskaya in round one, the Women's World Chess Championship 2006 where she was eliminated by tournament runner-up Alisa Galliamova in round two, the Women's World Chess Championship 2012 where she was eliminated by Anna Zatonskih in round one, and the Women's World Chess Championship 2015 where she was knocked out by Alisa Galliamova in round two.

Luján has represented Argentina, on board one of the women's team, in seven Chess Olympiads from 2002 to 2014. Her best results were at the 35th Chess Olympiad in Bled in 2002, where she scored 8½/13 and finished 11th, and the 40th Chess Olympiad in Istanbul in 2012, where she scored 6/9 with a performance rating of 2455, to finish 13th on board one.

Luján earned the Woman Grandmaster (WGM) title in May 2005 for her results at the 35th Chess Olympiad in Bled 2002, the American Continental Chess Championship in Buenos Aires 2003, and Ciudad de Chacabuco tournament in Buenos Aires 2004. She earned the open International Master (IM) title in January 2007, for her results at the American Continental Chess Championship 2003, Vila de Sort 2006, and Ciutat de Balaguer 2006.

She won the Mediterranean Flowers WGM tournament in Rijeka 2008, the Graz WGM tournament in 2010, and jointly won the Pan American Women's Championship in Campinas, Brazil in 2010, amongst others. In that year she won the Konex Award as one of the five best Chess Player of the last decade in Argentina.

Luján won the 2014 American Continental Women's Chess Championship in Buenos Aires.
