= Maka Purtseladze =

Georgian chess player (born 1988)

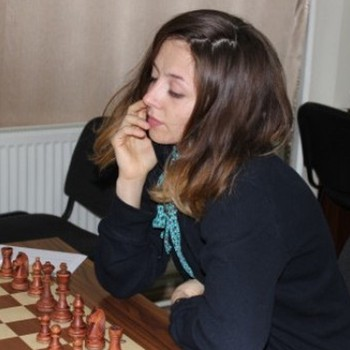
- Maka Purtseladze

Personal information
- Born: 18 February 1988 (age 38) Gurjaani, Kakheti, Soviet Georgia

Chess career
- Country: Georgia
- Title: International Master (2005); Woman Grandmaster (2005)
- FIDE rating: 2261 (September 2022)
- Peak rating: 2380 (September 2009)

Maka Purtseladze (Georgian: მაკა ფურცელაძე; born 18 February 1988) is a Georgian chess player. She received the FIDE titles of Woman Grandmaster (WGM) and International Master (IM) in 2005.

== Biography ==
From 1997 to 2006, Maka Purtseladze represented Georgia in the World Youth Chess Championships and European Youth Chess Championships, in which she won five medals: gold (in 2005, in World Youth Chess Championship in the U18 girls group), 2 silver (in 2003, in the European Youth Chess Championship in the U16 girls group and in 2005, in European Junior Chess Championship in the U18 girls group) and 2 bronzes (in 2004, in World Youth Chess Championship in the U16 girls group and in the European Youth Chess Championship in the U16 girls group). In 2005, she shared with Sopiko Khukhashvili the first place in the Georgian Junior Chess Championship in the U20 girls group. In 2006, she shared with Lela Javakhishvili and Maia Lomineishvili 3rd place in the Georgian Women's Chess Championship after winners Nino Khurtsidze and Nana Dzagnidze.

Four times participated in European Individual Chess Championships (2005, 2010–2011, 2013), which best result achieved in 2005 in Chişinău, where having taken the 16th place and qualifying for the Women's World Chess Championship.

In 2006, Purtseladze participated in Women's World Chess Championship by knock-out system and in the first round lost to Alisa Galliamova.
