= Tatiana Kononenko =

Ukrainian chess player (born 1978)

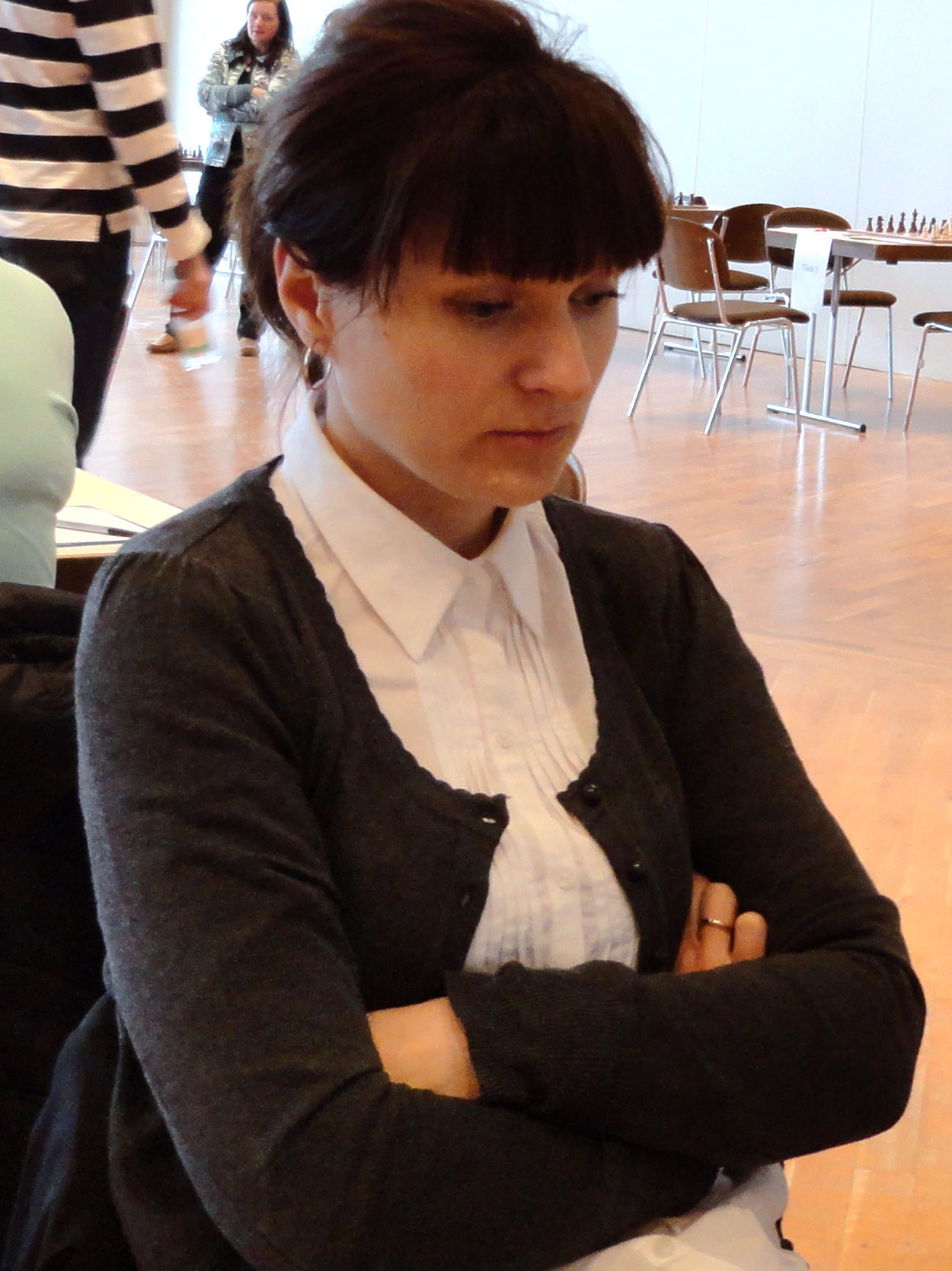
- Kononenko in 2012

Personal information
- Born: 5 December 1978 (age 47) Kramatorsk, Ukraine

Chess career
- Country: Ukraine
- Title: International Master (2006); Woman Grandmaster (1998)
- FIDE rating: 2353 (April 2015)
- Peak rating: 2442 (July 2005)

Tatiana Kononenko (Ukrainian: Тетяна Сергіївна Кононенко; born 5 December 1978) is a Ukrainian chess player. She received the FIDE titles of Woman International Master (WIM) in 1997 and Woman Grandmaster (WGM) a year later. In 2006, Kononenko earned the FIDE International Master (IM) title.

== Chess career ==
From 1995 to 1997 Kononenko participated in European Youth Chess Championships and twice won silver medals: in 1995 in Żagań (age category U18) and 1996 in Tapolca (age category U20). In 1998 in Kyiv she won silver medal in Ukrainian Youth Chess Championship in age category U20. In 2001 in Kramatorsk Tatiana Kononenko won silver medal in Ukrainian Women's Chess Championship. In 2002 in Antalya she won silver medal in European Women's Blitz chess Championship. Won multiple international women's chess tournaments: Elisaveta Bykova memorial in Vladimir, Russia (2004, together with Yelena Dembo), Benasque (2005), Almería (2007).

In 2000s Kononenko participated in Women's World Chess Championship by knock-out system:

- In Women's World Chess Championship 2001 in the first round lost to Svetlana Petrenko,
- In Women's World Chess Championship 2006 in the first round lost to Iweta Radziewicz.

Kononenko played for Ukraine in the European Team Chess Championship:

- In 1999, at first reserve board in the 3rd European Team Chess Championship (women) in Batumi (+1, =0, -2).
