= Irina Vasilevich =

Russian chess player (born 1985)

Personal information
- Full name: Irina Alexandrovna Vasilevich
- Born: 19 April 1985 (age 41) Krasnoyarsk, Russia

Chess career
- Country: Russia
- Title: International Master (2005); Woman Grandmaster (2005)
- Peak rating: 2407 (July 2005)

Irina Alexandrovna Vasilevich (Russian: Ирина Александровна Василевич; born 19 April 1985) is a Russian chess player who holds the titles of Woman Grandmaster and International Master.

== Biography ==
In 2006, Irina Vasilevich won the International Women's Chess Tournament in Krk. In 2011, she won the International Women's Chess Tournament in Rijeka. In 2013, Irina Vasilevich won the Moscow City Women's Chess Championship. She four times participated at the European Women's Chess Clubs Cup (2005, 2007, 2010-2011).

In 2000s Irina Vasilevich participated in Women's World Chess Championship by knock-out system:

- In Women's World Chess Championship 2006 in the first round lost to Svetlana Matveeva,
- In Women's World Chess Championship 2010 in the first round lost to Marie Sebag.

In 2004, she was awarded the FIDE Woman International Master (WIM) title and received the FIDE Woman Grandmaster (WGM) and International Master (IM) titles year later.
