= Svetlana Matveeva =

Russian chess player (born 1969)

Personal information
- Born: Svetlana Vladislavovna Matveeva; July 4, 1969 (age 57) Frunze, Kirghiz SSR, Soviet Union

Chess career
- Country: Soviet Union (until 1991); Kyrgyzstan (1992–1994); Russia (since 1994)
- Title: International Master (2005); Woman Grandmaster (1989)
- Peak rating: 2502 (January 2004)

Svetlana Vladislavovna Matveeva (Russian: Светлана Владиславовна Матвеева; born 4 July 1969) is a Russian chess player holding the titles of International Master and Woman Grandmaster.

In 1984, she tied for first with Anna Akhsharumova in the Women's Soviet Chess Championship. Matveeva won it again in 1991. Matveeva won the European Junior Girls Chess Championship in 1989.

She played for Kyrgyzstan at the 1992 Women's Chess Olympiad but later moved to Moscow and represented Russia in five Women's Chess Olympiads, from 1994 to 2002, and in two Women's European Team Chess Championships, in 1997 and 2003. At the Women's Chess Olympiads she won two team bronze medals, in 1996 and 2000, two team silver medals, in 1998 and 2002, and an individual bronze for her performance on board two in 2002. In the 2003 European Women's Team Chess Championship in Plovdiv, Matveeva took team bronze and two individual gold medals, for the best rating performance (2720) and for the best performance on board two (5½/6 points).

She took part in the Women's World Chess Championship 2000, where she was eliminated in the second round by the eventual winner, Xie Jun. Matveeva reached the second round again at the Women's World Chess Championship 2004, losing this time to Nataša Bojković.

In 2002, she reached the semifinals in the Women's World Cup, where she was knocked out by Antoaneta Stefanova. In 2004 Matveeva won the Women's ACP Internet Tournament.

Matveeva made it to the quarterfinals in the Women's World Chess Championship 2006: she knocked out sequentially Irina Vasilevich, Karen Zapata, Subbaraman Vijayalakshmi, and Marie Sebag, then lost to the eventual winner, Xu Yuhua.

In the Women's World Chess Championship 2008 she knocked out defending champion Xu Yuhua in the second round, then she lost to Anna Ushenina, thus exiting the competition.

She competed in the Women's World Chess Championship 2012, where she was knocked out in the first round by Natalia Pogonina.
