= Madina Davletbayeva =

Kazakhstani chess player (born 1989)

Personal information
- Born: 19 August 1989 (age 36) Taraz, Kazakh SSR, Soviet Union

Chess career
- Country: Kazakhstan
- Title: Woman Grandmaster (2016)
- Peak rating: 2301 (May 2017)

Madina Davletbayeva (Kazakh: Мәдина Дәулетбаева, Mädina Däuletbaeva; born 19 August 1989) is a Kazakhstani chess player who holds the title of Woman Grandmaster. She is a winner of the Kazakhstani Women's Chess Championship and has represented Kazakhstan at three Chess Olympiads.

== Biography ==
In 2009, Davletbayeva won Kazakhstani Women's Chess Championship. In 2011, she won the Women's Asian Zonal Tournament and was given the right to participate in the Women's World Chess Championship. In 2012, in Khanty-Mansiysk, Davletbayeva made her debut at the Women's World Chess Championship, where in the first round she lost to Tatiana Kosintseva.

In 2014, she was second in Kazakhstani Women's Chess Championship. In 2015, Davletbayeva was a member of the Macedonian chess club from Skopje Gambit-Aseko who won team silver in the European Women's Chess Club Cup. In 2017, she again won the silver medal at Kazakhstani Women's Chess Championship.

Davletbayeva has played for Kazakhstan:

- at three Women's Chess Olympiads (2010–2014) and won individual bronze (2012) medal
- at two World Women's Team Chess Championships (2013–2015)
- at three Women's Asian Team Chess Championships (2012–2016) and won team bronze (2016) medal, and individual gold (2014) medal
- at Asian Indoor Games team chess tournament in 2009

She was awarded the Woman International Master (WIM) title in 2011 and received the FIDE Woman Grandmaster (WGM) title five years later.
