= Irina Berezina =

Australian chess player (born 1965)

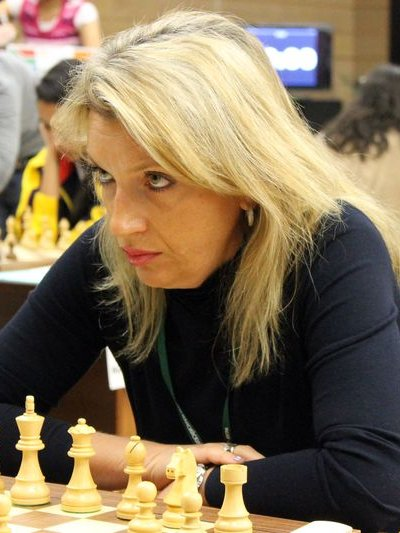
- Irina Berezina playing in the Women's World Chess Championship 2012

Personal information
- Born: 7 July 1965 (age 61) Kiev, Ukrainian SSR, Soviet Union
- Spouse: Vladimir Feldman

Chess career
- Country: Soviet Union; Russia (1992–93); Australia
- Title: International Master (1999); Woman International Master (1993)
- Peak rating: 2304 (January 2000)

Irina Berezina (also known as Irina Feldman and Irina Berezina-Feldman; born 7 July 1965) is an Australian chess International Master and trainer, and five-time Oceania women's chess champion. She was born in Kyiv, Ukraine.

== Chess career ==
Berezina tied for first place in the Women's Zonal 12 Championship in Jakarta in 1993, and as a result was awarded the FIDE title of Woman International Master (WIM).

In 1995 she won the Asian-Pacific Women's Zonal Championship in the Genting Highlands, Malaysia and went on to play in the 1995 Women's Interzonal Championship in Kishinev, Moldova, where she scored 5.5 points from 13 games.

Berezina was chosen to represent Australia in chess at the 1997 Maccabiah Games in Israel. However, she suffered critical injuries when the Maccabiah bridge collapsed underneath the Australian contingent.

Berezina won the Australian Women's Championship in 1999. In the same year, she achieved the title of International Master (IM) by coming equal second in the inaugural Oceania Zonal Championship held on the Gold Coast, Australia. She won the Oceania Women's Zonal Championship five times: in 2002, 2005, 2007, 2011, and 2013.

She competed in the Women's World Chess Championship three times: in 2006, 2012, and 2015.

Berezina played on board one of the Australian national team at seven Women's Chess Olympiads, in 1994, 1996, 2000, 2002, 2004, 2006 and 2014.

== Trainer ==
She has a degree in Chess Coaching from Kiev Institute of Physical Culture and Sport, and is a co-owner of "Chess Masters", a chess coaching business in Sydney, with her husband, IM Vladimir Feldman.

In 2005 Berezina was accredited as a FIDE Trainer by FIDE.
