= Faridah Basta Sohair =

Egyptian chess player (born 1957)

Personal information
- Born: 4 April 1957 (age 69)

Chess career
- Country: Egypt
- Title: Woman International Master (1993)
- FIDE rating: 2008 (November 2010)
- Peak rating: 2083 (October 2004)

Faridah Basta Sohair (Arabic: فريدة بسطا سهير; born 4 April 1957) is an Egyptian chess player. She received the FIDE title of Woman International Master (WIM) in 1993.

== Biography ==
In 2005, Faridah Basta Sohair won silver medal in African Women's Chess Championship in Lusaka and qualified to participate in the Women's World Chess Championship. In 2006, Faridah Basta Sohair participated in the Women's World Chess Championship by knock-out system and lost to Pia Cramling in the first round. In 2007, she ranked 6th in the African Women's Chess Championship in Windhoek. In 2007, she played for Egypt in the All-Africa Games chess tournament, which ranked 5th in the team ranking.

Faridah Basta Sohair played for Egypt in the Women's Chess Olympiads:

- In 1980, at first board in the 9th Chess Olympiad (women) in Valletta (+7, =2, -5),
- In 1982, at first board in the 10th Chess Olympiad (women) in Lucerne (+3, =2, -7),
- In 1984, at first board in the 26th Chess Olympiad (women) in Thessaloniki (+5, =2, -5),
- In 1990, at first board in the 29th Chess Olympiad (women) in Novi Sad (+7, =2, -3),
- In 2008, at second board in the 38th Chess Olympiad (women) in Dresden (+4, =1, -5),
- In 2010, at fourth board in the 39th Chess Olympiad (women) in Khanty-Mansiysk (+3, =3, -3).

In 1993, she was awarded the FIDE Woman International Master (WIM) title.
