= Maritza Arribas Robaina =

Cuban chess player

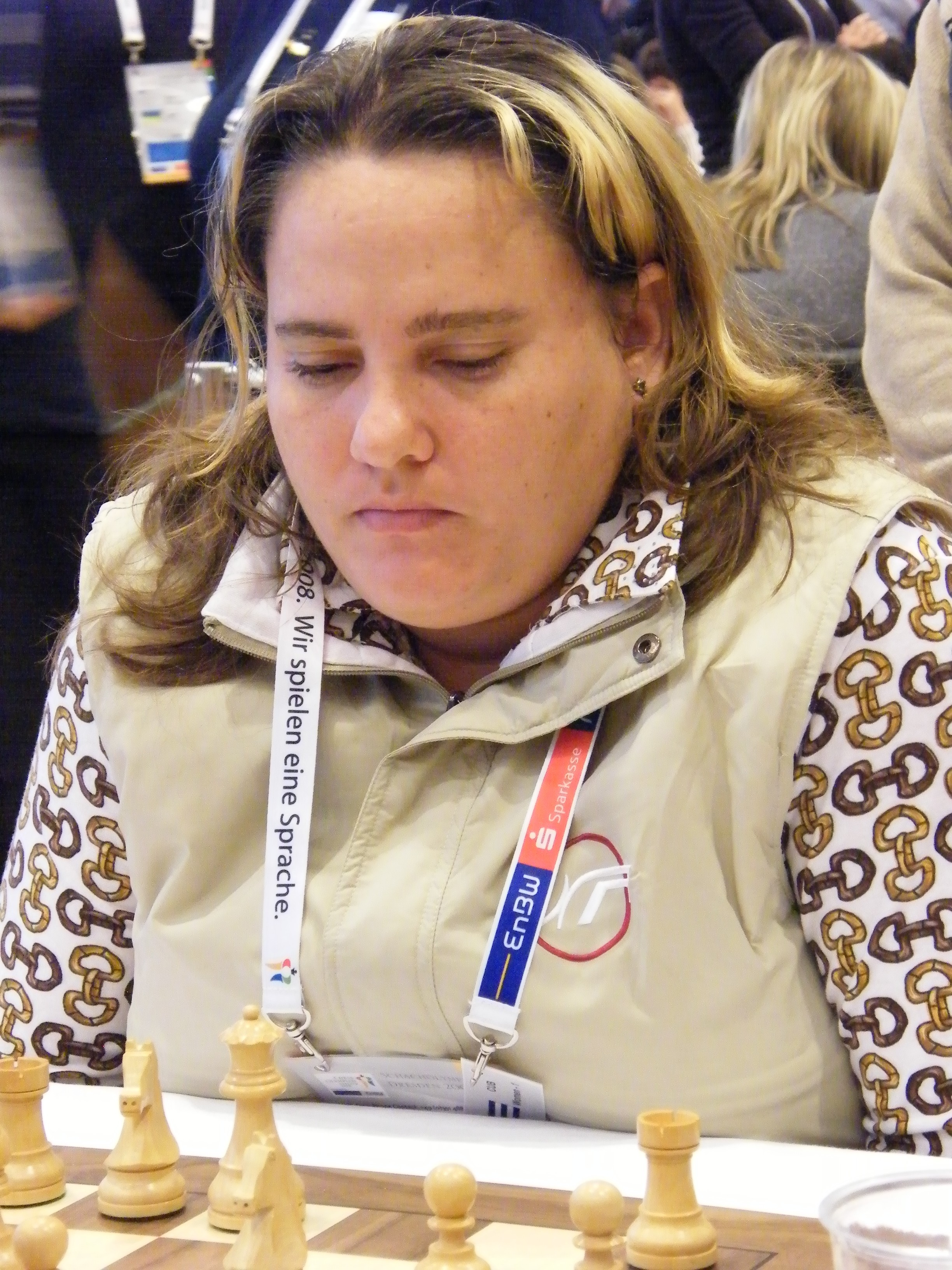

Personal information
- Born: July 2, 1971 (age 55) Santiago de Cuba, Cuba

Chess career
- Country: Cuba
- Title: Woman Grandmaster (1999)
- Peak rating: 2366 (July 2003)

Maritza Arribas Robaina (born 2 July 1971) is a Cuban chess player who holds the FIDE title of Woman Grandmaster. She won the Cuban women's chess championship eleven times (1992, 1997, 2001, 2002, 2003, 2004, 2007, 2008, 2009, 2013, 2015).

Arribas Robaina competed in the Women's World Chess Championships of 2000, 2001, 2004, 2006, 2008 and 2012. She reached the second round in 2000, 2006 and 2012.

She played for the Cuban team in the Women's Chess Olympiads of 1988, 1990, 1994, 1996, 1998, 2000, 2002, 2006, 2008, 2010, 2012 and 2014.

She was born in Santiago de Cuba.
