= Karen Zapata =

Peruvian chess player (born 1982)

Personal information
- Born: Lidia Karen Zapata Campos; 28 December 1982 (age 43) Ferreñafe, Peru

Chess career
- Country: Peru (until 2023); Spain (since 2023)
- Title: Woman International Master (1999)
- Peak rating: 2236 (April 2006)

Lidia Karen Zapata Campos (born 28 December 1982) is a Peruvian chess player who plays for Spain. She holds the FIDE title of Woman International Master (WIM, 1999). She is a four-time winner of the Peruvian Women's Chess Championship (2000, 2002, 2003, 2004).

== Biography ==
In 1999, in Santiago won the Pan American Girl's Chess Championship in the age group U20, and in 2000 in Bento Gonçalves won the Pan American Girl's Chess Championship in the age group U18. In 2002, in La Paz she was the second in the Pan American Girl's Chess Championship in the age group U20. In August 2005, she was second in the Pan American Women's Chess Championship, only in a tie-break after losing to Argentine player Claudia Amura. She won four times in the Peruvian Women's Chess Championships: 2000, 2002, 2003 and 2004. In October 2005, after winning the FIDE South America zone tournament, she qualified for the Women's World Chess Championship. In 2006, in Yekaterinburg she participated in the Women's World Chess Championship, where she defeated Kateryna Lagno in the first round, but lost in the second round to Svetlana Matveeva. After repeated won the FIDE South America zone tournament in 2007 in Trujillo, where she surpassed her compatriot Deysi Cori, was selected at Women's World Chess Championship in Nalchik, but refused to participate, and her rival in the first round Antoaneta Stefanova went to the second round without a fight. Played for Peru at three Women's Chess Olympiads (2002—2006). In 1999, she was awarded the FIDE International Woman International Master (WIM) title.
