= Melissa Castrillón Gómez =

Colombian chess player (born 1995)

Personal information
- Born: 1995 (age 30–31)

Chess career
- Country: Colombia
- Title: Woman International Master (2012)
- Peak rating: 2301 (November 2018)

Melissa Castrillón Gómez (born 1995) is a Colombian chess player who holds the title of Woman International Master. She has represented Colombia at three Chess Olympiads.

== Biography ==
In 2009, in Mar del Plata, Castrillón won Pan American Girls' Chess Championship in the under 14 age group. In 2011, in La Ceja she won South American Zonal Women's Chess Championship and was given the right to participate in Women's World Chess Championship. In 2012, in Khanty-Mansiysk, Castrillón made her debut in the Women's World Chess Championship, where in the first round she lost to Nadezhda Kosintseva.

She has played for Colombia at four Chess Olympiads (2012–2018) and won individual silver medal at the 2012 Olympiad.

Castrillón was awarded the Woman FIDE Master (WFM) in 2009, and as a result of her performance in the 2011 South American Zonal Women's Chess Championship she was awarded the Woman International Master (WIM) title in 2012.

She won the women's section of the Colombian Chess Championship in 2020.
