= Hoàng Xuân Thanh Khiết =

Vietnamese chess player (born 1985)

Personal information
- Born: 1985 (age 40–41)

Chess career
- Country: Vietnam
- Title: Woman International Master (2005)
- FIDE rating: 2072 (October 2013)
- Peak rating: 2198 (April 2006)

Hoàng Xuân Thanh Khiết (born 1985) is a Vietnamese chess player and Woman International Master. She was the 2005 Vietnamese Women's Chess Championship winner.

== Biography ==
In 2004, Hoàng Xuân Thanh Khiết won silver medal in Vietnamese Women's Chess Championship, but in 2005, she won Vietnamese Women's Chess Championship. In 2005, Hoàng Xuân Thanh Khiết won 3rd place in Women's World Chess Championship Asian Zonal tournament un got the right to participate in the Women's World Chess Championship. In 2006, Hoàng Xuân Thanh Khiết participated in Women's World Chess Championship by knock-out system and in the first round lost to Xu Yuhua.

Hoàng Xuân Thanh Khiết played for Vietnam in the Women's Chess Olympiad:

- In 2004, at first reserve board in the 36th Chess Olympiad (women) in Calvià (+4, =0, -5).

In 2005, she was awarded the FIDE Woman International Master (WIM) title.
