= Tuduetso Sabure =

Botswana chess player (born 1982)

Personal information
- Born: 16 June 1982 (age 44)

Chess career
- Country: Botswana
- Title: Woman Grandmaster (2005)
- Peak rating: 2075 (July 2004)

Tuduetso Sabure (born 16 June 1982) is a Botswana chess player. She received the FIDE title of Woman Grandmaster (WGM) in 2005.

== Biography ==
In 2005, in Lusaka won African Women's Chess Championship and won the right to participate in the Women's World Chess Championship. In 2006 Tuduetso Sabure participated in the Women's World Chess Championship, held by knock-out system, and in the first round lost to Humpy Koneru. In 2007, in Windhoek, she ranked 7th in the African Women's Chess Championship. In 2007, she played for Botswana in the All-Africa Games chess tournament, which ranked 4th in the team ranking, and World Women's Team Chess Championship. In 2017, in Cairo, she ranked 17th in African Women's Chess Championship.

Tuduetso Sabure played for Botswana in the Women's Chess Olympiads:

- In 1998, at third board in the 33rd Chess Olympiad (women) in Elista (+5, =0, -7),
- In 2000, at first reserve board in the 34th Chess Olympiad (women) in Istanbul (+4, =2, -2),
- In 2004, at second board in the 36th Chess Olympiad (women) in Calvià (+5, =0, -5),
- In 2010, at first board in the 39th Chess Olympiad (women) in Khanty-Mansiysk (+4, =1, -4).
