= Evgenija Ovod =

Russian chess player

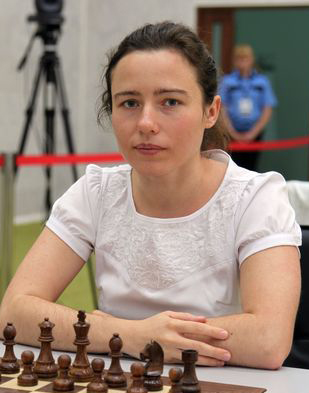
- Ovod in 2015

Personal information
- Born: November 10, 1982 (age 43)

Chess career
- Title: International Master (2001); Woman Grandmaster (2001)
- Peak rating: 2447 (July 2009)

Evgenija Ovod (born 10 November 1982) is a Russian chess player, an International Master and a Woman Grandmaster.

She competed in the Women's World Chess Championship 2012, 2010 and 2006.
