= Women's World Chess Championship 2013 =

Chess match between Anna Ushenina and Hou Yifan

	Defending champion	Challenger
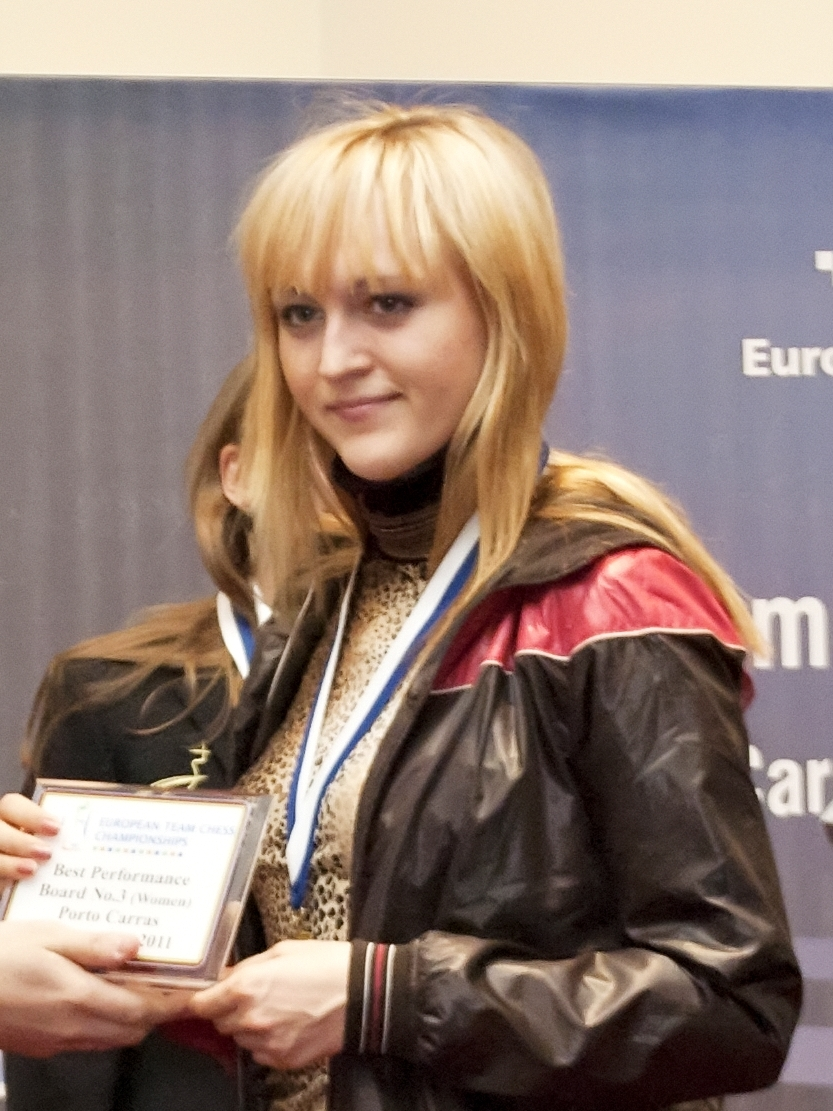
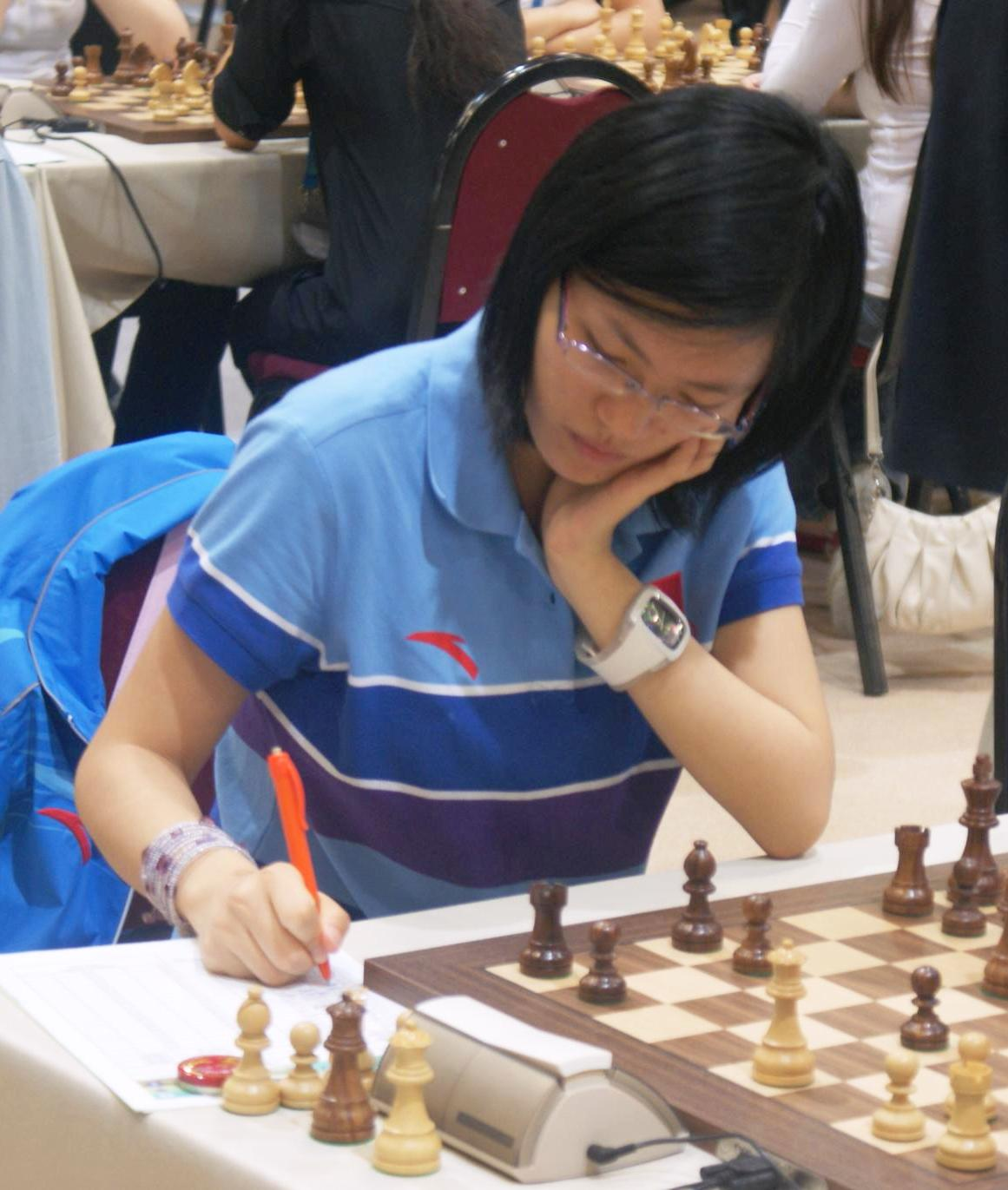
	(Ukraine) Anna Ushenina	(China) Hou Yifan
1½	Scores	5½
	Born 30 August 1985; 28 years old	Born 27 February 1994; 19 years old
	Winner of the Women's World Chess Championship 2012	Winner of the FIDE Women's Grand Prix 2011–2012
	Rating: 2500 (Women's World No. 17)	Rating: 2609 (Women's World No. 2)

The Women's World Chess Championship 2013 was a chess match for the championship. The match was scheduled over ten games from 10 to 27 September 2013 in Taizhou, Jiangsu, China.

The match was played between defending champion Anna Ushenina, winner of the Women's World Chess Championship 2012, and challenger Hou Yifan, the previous champion and winner of the FIDE Women's Grand Prix 2011–2012.

After seven of ten games Hou Yifan won the match 5.5 to 1.5 to retake the title.

== Previous head-to-head record ==
Prior to the match, as of 23 May 2013, Anna Ushenina and Hou Yifan have played 8 games against each other at classical time control with the following statistics:

	Anna Ushenina wins	Draw games	Hou Yifan wins	Total
Anna Ushenina (White) – Hou Yifan (Black)	0	0	1	1
Hou Yifan (White) – Anna Ushenina (Black)	2	3	2	7
Total	2	3	3	8

== Format ==
The match is played as at most ten classical games in the Taizhou Hotel, or less if one player reaches 5.5 points before that. The time controls are 90 minutes for the first 40 moves, followed by 30 minutes for the rest of the game, with an increment of 30 seconds per move starting from move one. In case of a tie there will be a new drawing of colors and then four rapid games with 25 minutes for each player and an increment of ten seconds after each move. If the scores are level after the four rapid games, then, after a new drawing of colours, a match of two games will be played with a time control of five minutes plus three seconds' increment after each move. In case of a level score, another two-game match will be played to determine a winner. If there is still no winner after five such matches (i.e. after ten games), one sudden-death game will be played. The prize fund is 200,000 Euros with 60% for the winner and 40% to the loser if the match is decided within ten games or 55% and 45% if match is decided in tie-breaks.

== Schedule ==
- 10 September – Opening ceremony
- 11 September – Game 1
- 12 September – Game 2
- 13 September – Rest day
- 14 September – Game 3
- 15 September – Game 4
- 16 September – Rest day
- 17 September – Game 5
- 18 September – Game 6
- 19 September – Rest day
- 20 September – Game 7
- 21 September – Game 8
- 22 September – Rest day
- 23 September – Game 9
- 24 September – Rest day
- 25 September – Game 10
- 26 September – Rest day
- 27 September – Tie-break games
- 28 September – Closing ceremony

== Match ==
The drawing of colors was on the opening ceremony day on 10 September. The first two games were played on 11 and 12 September. After every two games there is a rest day. Ushenina drew the white colors and played the first game with white. A switch of colors occurred after game 4. Hou Yifan dominated the match, winning four games, drawing three and losing none, and thus regained the championship title which she had lost the previous year.

Women's World Chess Championship Match 2013
	Rating	1	2	3	4	5	6	7	Points
Anna Ushenina (Ukraine)	2500	0	½	0	½	½	0	0	1½
Hou Yifan (China)	2609	1	½	1	½	½	1	1	5½
