= Sopiko Khukhashvili =

Georgian chess player

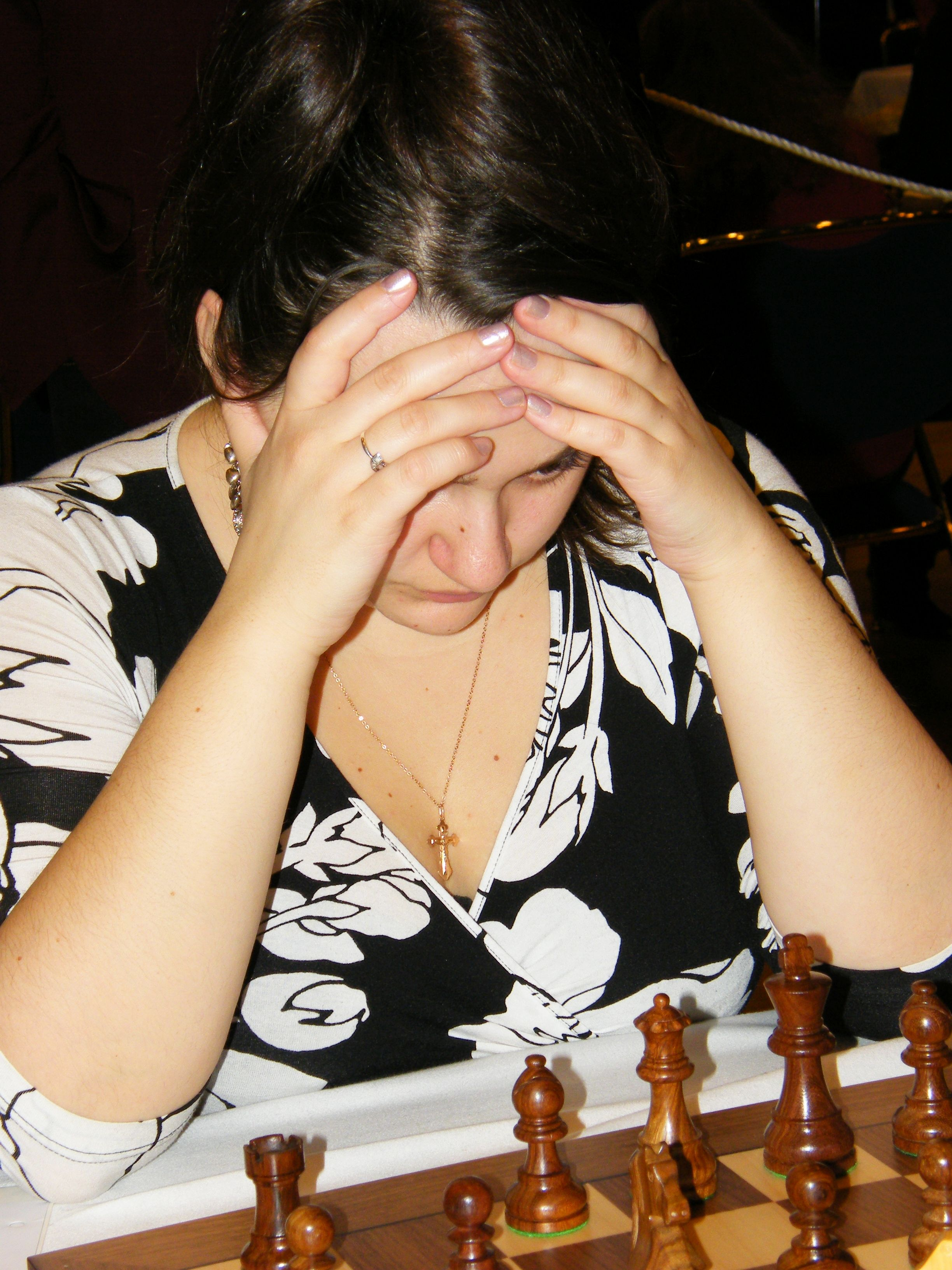
- Khukhashvili in Dresden 2008

Personal information
- Born: January 4, 1985 (age 41)

Chess career
- Country: Georgia
- Title: International Master (2007); Woman Grandmaster (2005)
- Peak rating: 2451 (September 2009)

Sopiko Khukhashvili (Georgian: სოფიკო ხუხაშვილი; born 4 January 1985) is a Georgian chess player. She holds the titles of International Master and Woman Grandmaster.

Khukhashvili won the Girls U16 section of the World Youth Chess Championships twice, in 1999 and 2000. She competed in the Women's World Chess Championship in 2010 and 2012. She reached the second round in 2010.
