= Anna Ushenina =

Ukrainian chess grandmaster (born 1985)

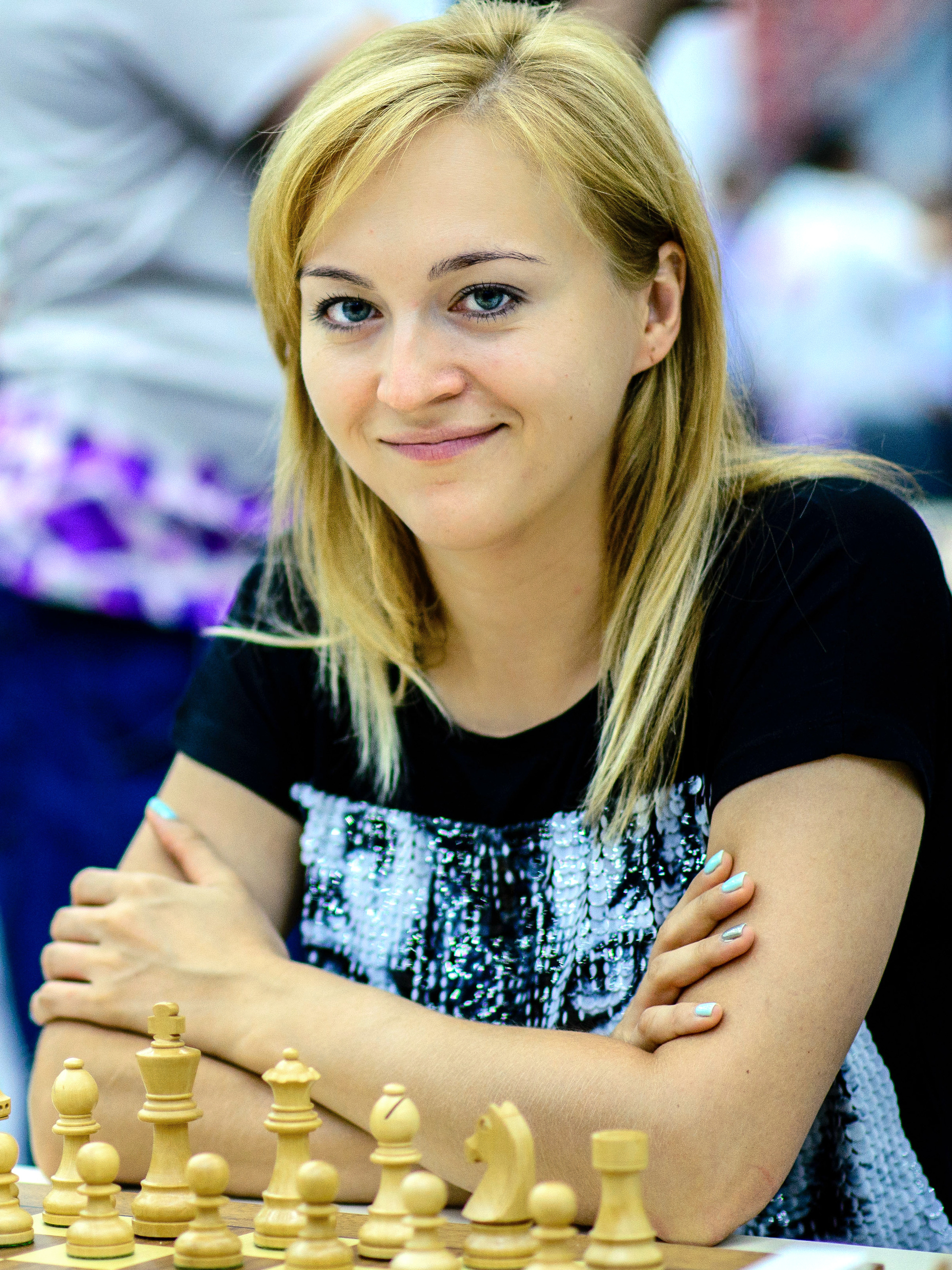
- Ushenina in Baku in 2016

Personal information
- Born: Anna Yuriyivna Ushenina; 30 August 1985 (age 41) Kharkiv, Ukrainian SSR, Soviet Union

Chess career
- Country: Ukraine
- Title: Grandmaster (2012)
- Women's World Champion: 2012–2013
- FIDE rating: 2403 (October 2026)
- Peak rating: 2502 (July 2007)

Anna Yuriyivna Ushenina (Ukrainian: Анна Юріївна Ушеніна; born 30 August 1985) is a Ukrainian chess grandmaster who was Women's World Chess Champion from November 2012 to September 2013.

== Personal life ==
Ushenina lives in Kharkiv, where she was born. She is of Jewish ethnicity. Determined that the young Ushenina should develop intellectual and creative talents, her mother introduced her to chess at the age of seven, along with painting and music. She became the Ukrainian Girls' (under 20) champion at 15 years old. Many of her chess skills have been self-taught, although in 2000–2002, she studied chess in the Kharkiv sports school of Olympic reserve. During this period, her coach was International Master Artiom Tsepotan. Afterwards, she received more coaching at a specialist facility in Kramatorsk.

== National success ==
At the national Ukrainian Women's Championship, her progress and achievements have been noteworthy. In 2003 (Mykolaiv) and 2004 (Alushta), she finished in fourth and sixth places respectively, thereafter becoming the champion at Alushta in 2005, and outperforming top seed Tatjana Vasilevich along the way. She almost repeated this success at Odesa in 2006, finishing second, but ahead of the higher-rated Natalia Zhukova and Inna Gaponenko. At these combined (men and women) events, she has defeated grandmasters of the calibre of Anton Korobov and Oleg Romanishin and in Ukraine was endowed with the title "Honored Master of Sports".

== Team performances ==
Her many successes in team chess reached an early pinnacle in 2006. At the Turin Women's Olympiad she was a part of the victorious Ukrainian team and remained undefeated throughout the contest. Ushenina and her compatriots, Natalia Zhukova (also undefeated), Kateryna Lagno , and Inna Gaponenko each scored between 70 and 80%, in what was a commanding performance, earning them team gold medals and much adulation in chess circles. In 2008, at the Dresden Olympiad, Ukraine's ladies took home the team silver medals, after failing to oust the powerful Georgian team from the top spot.

For Ushenina, her earliest major medal-winning performance occurred in Balatonlelle, at the European Team Championship for Girls (under 18) in 2002, where she took team gold and individual silver on board 1. On another occasion at the 2007 Women's World Team Chess Championship in Yekaterinburg, she helped Ukraine to a bronze medal finish and added an individual bronze to her tally. She has also played twice at the European Team Chess Championship, in 2005 and 2007. The team finished outside of the medal places each time, but for her personal performance, Ushenina took individual gold at the latter event, held in Heraklion, with 5/7. In 2022 she was part of the Ukraine team that won the gold medal at the Women's event at the 44th Chess Olympiad.

Between 2019- 2022 she was an active league chess player playing in European and World Championship events.

== Tournaments and titles ==
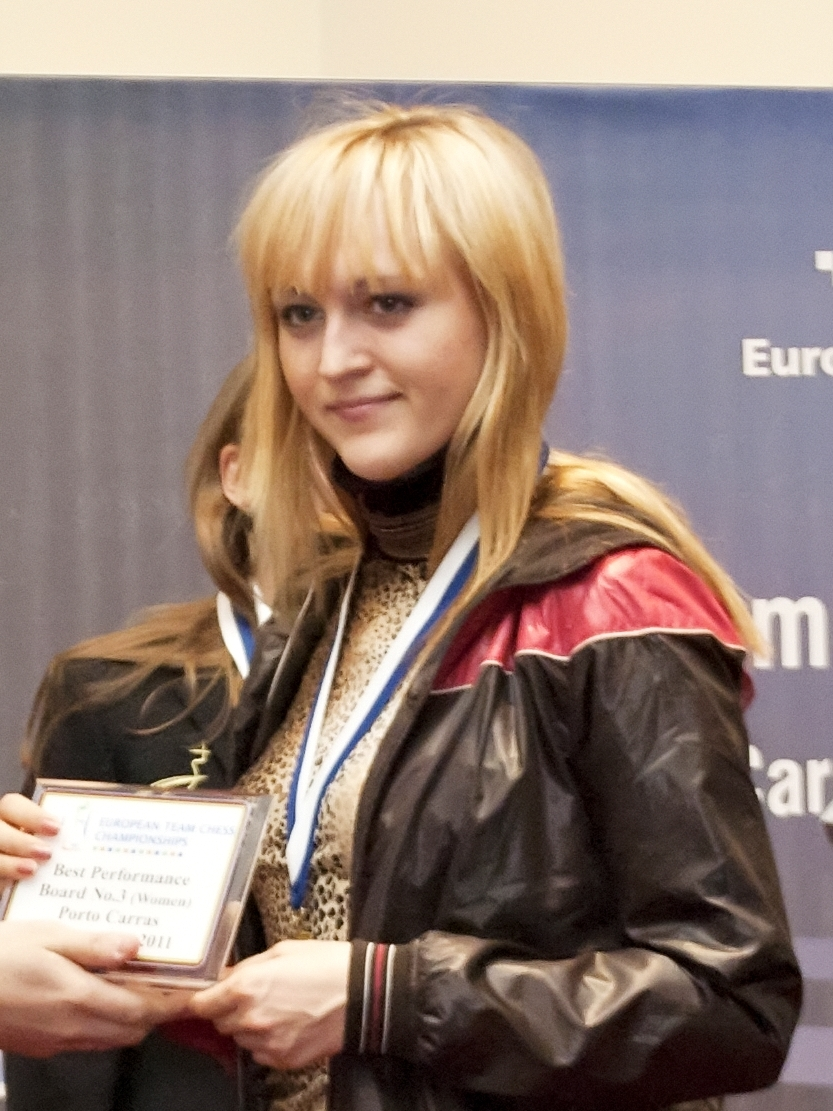
Anna Ushenina in 2011

Tournament successes at Kyiv in 2001 and Odesa in 2003, earned her the title Woman Grandmaster (WGM), awarded in 2003. Her performance at the 2006 Women's Chess Olympiad and subsequent results in Pardubice and Abu Dhabi in the same year then qualified her for the International Master (IM) title, awarded in January 2007.

In the 'A2' section of the prestigious Aeroflot Open in Moscow 2007, she scored 5 points from the first 7 rounds, defeating three male grandmasters for a part performance rating of 2672. In January 2008, she played in Group C of the Corus Chess Tournament in Wijk aan Zee , scoring 4 1/2/13 points. Soon after, at the women's section of the Moscow Open, she took second place, behind Anna Muzychuk, and ahead of Natalia Zhukova and Kateryna Lagno. Later that year, at the Women's European Individual Chess Championship, held in Plovdiv, she took the bronze medal, losing out 1–2 to Viktorija Čmilytė in the playoffs for silver. In 2010, she won the Rector Cup in Kharkiv with a performance rating of 2649.

In 2016, she won the European Women's Championship in Mamaia, edging out on tie-break score Sabrina Vega, after both players had scored 8.5/11 points.

She won the silver medal in the second GM group at the 2017 Maccabiah Games in Israel.

Ushenina was a member of the Ukrainian team that won gold medal in the women's championship at the 44th Chess Olympiad in Chennai. In addition, she also won an individual silver medal on board three in the same event.

== Women's World Champion ==
In the final of the Women's World Chess Championship 2012 she achieved a tiebreak victory over Antoaneta Stefanova to become the 14th Women's World Chess Champion. This automatically entitled her to the title of grandmaster and also qualified her to the 2013 Chess World Cup. She is Ukraine's first women's world chess champion and thanks to this victory Ushenina was voted Ukraine's best female chess player of 2012.

She lost her title against Hou Yifan in the Women's World Chess Championship 2013.

In 2019 she played in the Women's World Team Chess Championship, European Championship, Russian Team Championship, IMSA World Masters Rapid and Blitz, the European Club Cup and the World Rapid and Blitz Championship. In 2019 she played in the Isle of Man Grand Swiss which is a qualifying event for the open World Championship.

In 2020 she won the Women's Speed Chess Championship which was hosted online at Chess.com. In 2022 she won the Tata Steel India Women's Rapid tournament.

== See also ==
- List of Jewish chess players

== Notes ==
Preceded by Hou Yifan	Women's World Chess Champion; 2012–2013	Succeeded by Hou Yifan
