= Viktorija Čmilytė-Nielsen =

Lithuanian politician and chess grandmaster (born 1983)

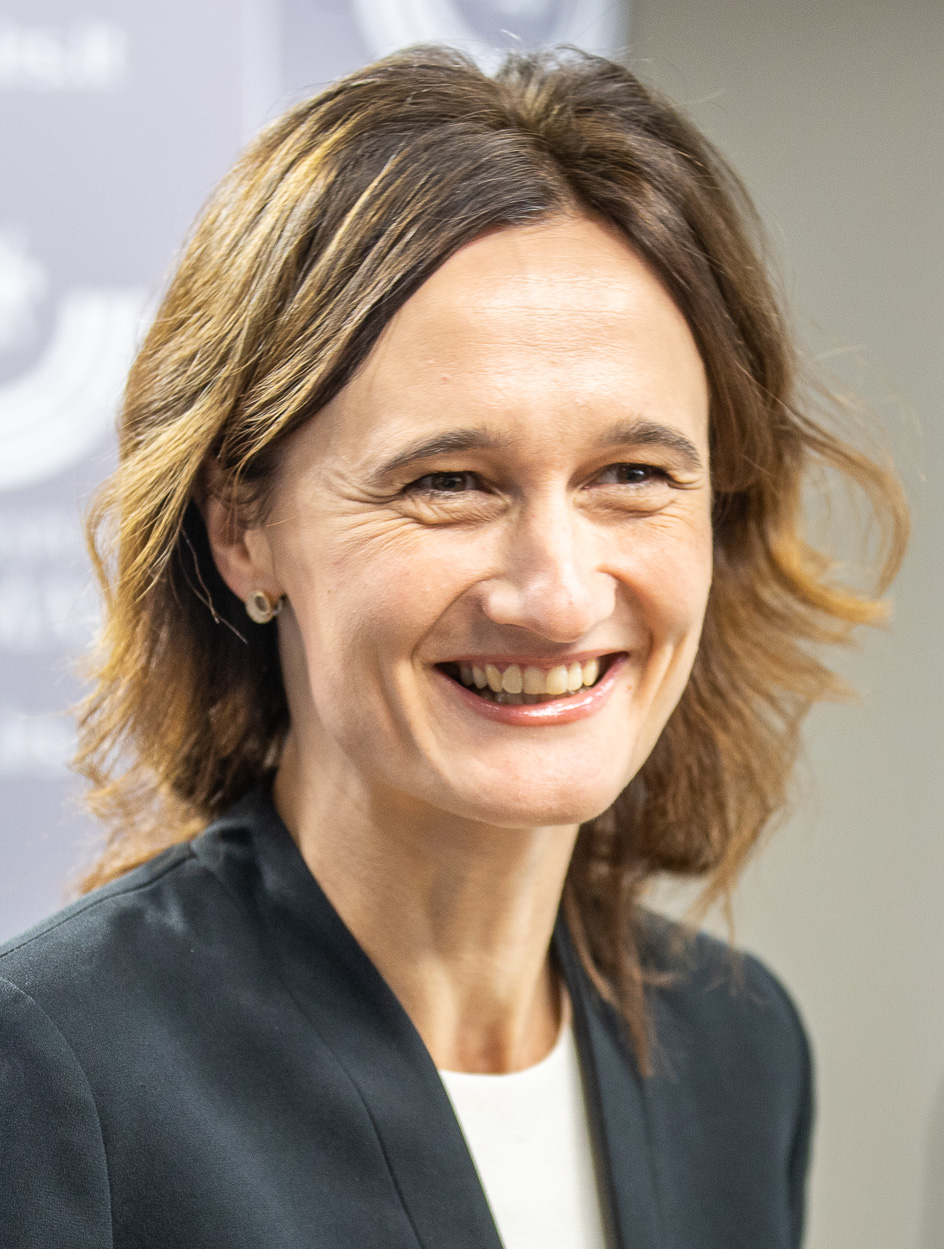
- Čmilytė-Nielsen in 2023

Speaker of the Seimas
- In office 13 November 2020 – 14 November 2024
- President: Gitanas Nausėda
- Preceded by: Viktoras Pranckietis
- Succeeded by: Saulius Skvernelis

Leader of the Liberal Movement
- Incumbent
- Assumed office 21 September 2019
- Preceded by: Eugenijus Gentvilas

Leader of the Opposition (Lithuania)
- In office 23 March 2019 – 10 September 2019
- Preceded by: Andrius Kubilius
- Succeeded by: Julius Sabatauskas

Member of the Seimas
- Incumbent
- Assumed office 13 November 2020
- Preceded by: Mykolas Majauskas
- Constituency: Senamiestis-Žvėrynas
- In office 21 April 2015 – 12 November 2020
- Preceded by: Remigijus Šimašius
- Constituency: Multi-member

Deputy Speaker of the Seimas
- Incumbent
- Assumed office 14 November 2024

Personal details
- Born: Viktorija Čmilytė; 6 August 1983 (age 43) Šiauliai, then part of the Lithuanian SSR, Soviet Union (Note: Lithuania was occupied and de facto incorporated into the Soviet Union during 1940–1941 and 1944–1991, though this annexation was not legally recognised by most of the international community.)
- Party: Liberal Movement
- Spouses: Alexei Shirov (m. 2001; div. 2007) Peter Heine Nielsen (m. 2013)
- Children: 4
- Education: University of Latvia (BA)
- Chess career
- Title: Grandmaster (2010)
- FIDE rating: 2538 (November 2026)
- Peak rating: 2542 (June 2017)

Viktorija Čmilytė-Nielsen (née Čmilytė; born 6 August 1983) is a Lithuanian politician and chess grandmaster who served as the speaker of the Seimas between 2020 and 2024. Awarded the title Grandmaster by FIDE in 2010, she was European women's champion in 2011, and is a two-time Lithuanian champion.

Čmilytė-Nielsen began her career in politics in 2015, when she was selected to replace Remigijus Šimašius in the Seimas for the Liberal Movement, and later was reelected in the 2016 parliamentary election. She began to gradually rise in the ranks of the Liberal Movement, becoming the Seimas opposition leader in 2019, and being elected chairperson of the Liberal Movement later that year. She led the party into the 2020 parliamentary election, where they won 13 seats.

== Early life and education ==
Viktorija Čmilytė was born in Šiauliai. She began playing chess at age six, and was coached by her father Viktor Ivanovič Čmil (Viktoras Čmilis), a KGB active reserve officer of Russian ethnicity and the head of the Šiauliai Chess Club. After graduating, Čmilytė moved to Riga to enroll in the Faculty of Humanities at the University of Latvia. She graduated with a degree in English philology in 2007.

== Chess career ==
Čmilytė spent her early chess career being coached by her father. In 1993, she won the European Youth Chess Championship in the under-12 girls category, and later won the 1995 World Youth Chess Championship in the same category.

In 2000, at the age of sixteen, Čmilytė won both the women's and absolute national championships of Lithuania, held in Vilnius. In winning the latter, she edged out Grandmasters Darius Ruželė, Viktor Gavrikov and Aloyzas Kveinys, and International Masters Vaidas Sakalauskas and Vytautas Šlapikas on tiebreak. Čmilytė won the absolute championship again in 2005 in her home city, on tiebreak from Šarūnas Šulskis.

She finished second to Jovanka Houska in the 2000 European Junior (Under-20) Girls Championship in Asturias. By 2001, she was ranked number one by FIDE amongst girls. In the same year she won the Corus Reserve Group tournament at Wijk aan Zee.

Čmilytė took the silver medal at the European Women's Individual Championship in 2003 (Silivri), 2008 (Plovdiv) and 2010 (Rijeka). She won the European Women's Rapid Chess Championship in 2007. She was awarded the Grandmaster title in 2010, having gained the required norms in the 2008 Gibraltar Chess Festival, 2009 European Team Chess Championship and 2010 European Women's Individual Championship. In 2011, Čmilytė finally took the gold medal in the European Women's Individual Championship.

Čmilytė competed in the Women's World Chess Championship for the first time in 2000, when she reached the third round. In 2004 she was defeated in the quarterfinals by former Women's World Champion Maia Chiburdanidze. In 2006, Čmilytė reached the semifinals and lost to the eventual runner-up, Alisa Galliamova. In 2008 and 2010 she was eliminated in the second round, while in 2010 and 2015 she went out in round three.

=== Team competitions ===
Čmilytė has played for the Lithuanian team in the 2010 Chess Olympiad (Open Section) and on other occasions participated in the Women's Chess Olympiads, where she won two individual gold medals on board one, the first at Istanbul in 2000 (9½/12) and the second at Calvià in 2004 (8½/11). She earned a place in the team for the first time when she was thirteen (in Yerevan, 1996) and was first board at fifteen (Elista, 1998), contributing a plus score each time.

In the Frauenbundesliga (Women's Bundesliga) in Germany, she is a team member of OSC Baden Baden, but has also played some league chess in Sweden.

== Political career ==
=== Parliamentary career ===
Čmilytė-Nielsen entered politics in 2015, as a member of the Liberal Movement. After Remigijus Šimašius resigned from the Seimas in order to take office as the mayor of Vilnius, Čmilytė-Nielsen took his seat in parliament.

A year afterwards, Čmilytė-Nielsen was selected to stand in the 2016 parliamentary election with the Liberal Movement, as a candidate on their nationwide party list. She ultimately was elected to parliament, and subsequently began to serve on the European affairs committee and human rights committee. During this term in parliament, Čmilytė-Nielsen began to amass more influence and prestige within the party, serving as deputy chair of the Liberal Movement parliamentary group in 2017 and 2018, and later serving as the parliamentary group's chair since 2018. In 2019, she was selected to serve as the Seimas opposition leader, becoming the spokesperson and leader of the parliamentary groups opposed to the incumbent Skvernelis government. She later resigned as opposition leader and was replaced by Julius Sabatauskas, but was later elected to serve as chairperson of the Liberal Movement in September 2019.

=== Liberal Movement ===
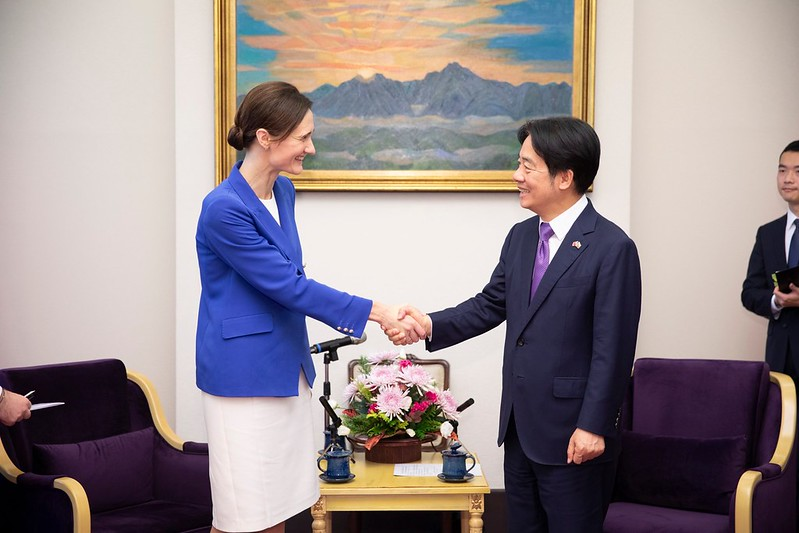
Čmilytė-Nielsen shaking hands with Vice President of Taiwan Lai Ching-te during her visit to Taiwan (2023)

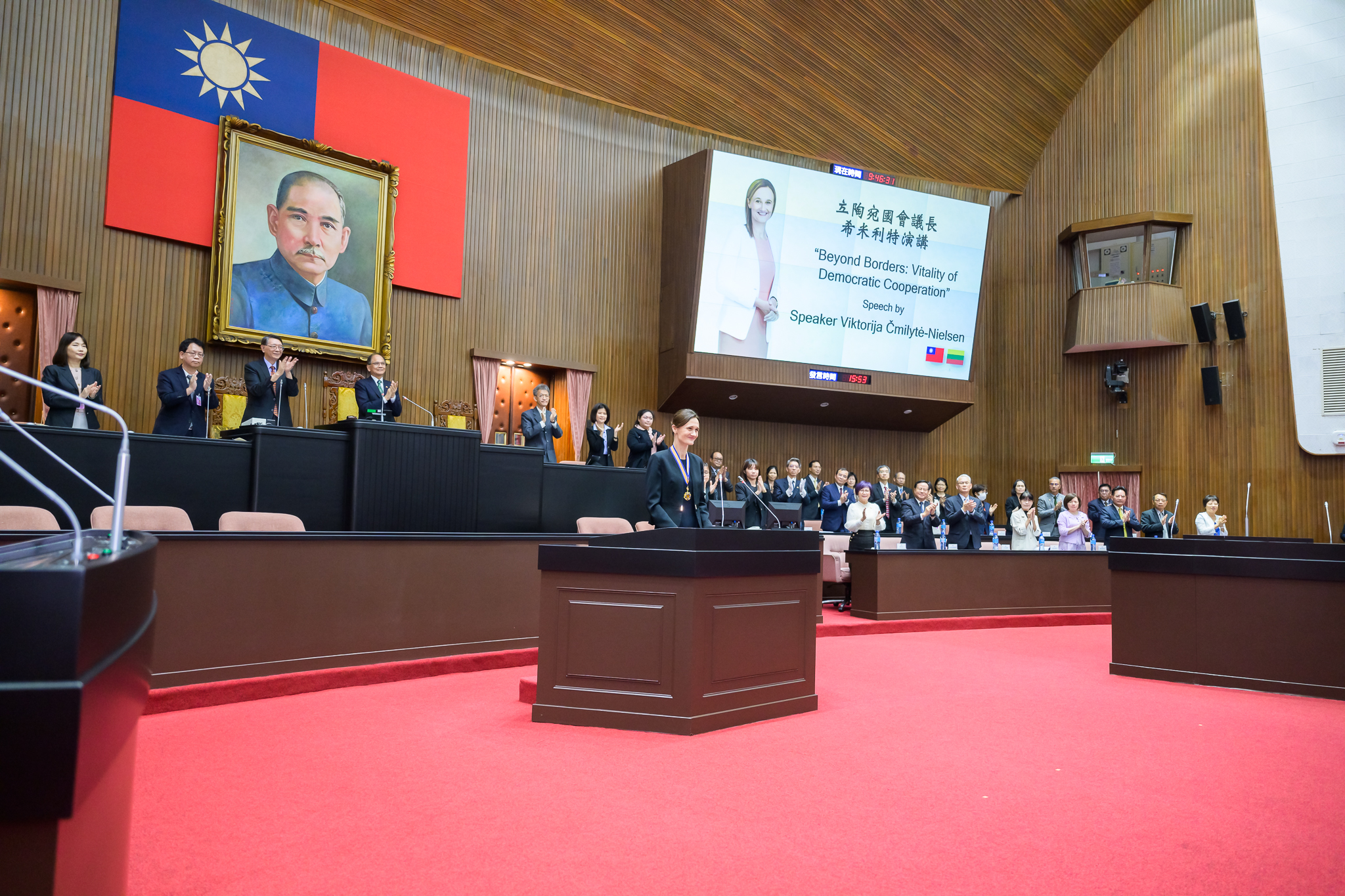
Čmilytė-Nielsen addressing at the Legislative Yuan (2023)

As party chair, Čmilytė-Nielsen was tasked with leading the Liberal Movement into the 2020 parliamentary election, where the party won 13 seats. Following the certification of election results, it emerged that a coalition would likely be formed between the Liberal Movement, Freedom Party, and election winners Homeland Union. Proposing Ingrida Šimonytė as their prime ministerial candidate, Čmilytė-Nielsen was expected to be one of the three main leaders of the incoming government, in addition to Šimonytė and Freedom Party leader Aušrinė Armonaitė, following in the footsteps of the Marin Cabinet in Finland for having a woman-led government. On 9 November, the coalition agreement was signed between the Homeland Union, Liberal Movement, and Freedom Party.

On 12 November, Čmilytė-Nielsen was nominated to serve as speaker of the Seimas, and was expected to be succeeded as Liberal Movement parliamentary leader by Eugenijus Gentvilas. She later was elected as speaker the following day, receiving 106 votes, becoming the third woman to serve in the position.

== Personal life ==
In addition to her native Lithuanian, she is also fluent in English, Russian, and Spanish.

Čmilytė married Latvian-Spanish chess player grandmaster Alexei Shirov in 2001, until divorcing in 2007. In 2013 she married Danish chess player grandmaster Peter Heine Nielsen. She has four children.

== Honours and awards ==
=== Honours ===
==== National honours ====
- Lithuania: Knight's Cross of the Order of the Lithuanian Grand Duke Gediminas
- Lithuania: Knight's Cross of the Order for Merits to Lithuania

==== Foreign honours ====
- Taiwan: Medal of Honor for Parliamentary Diplomacy
- Ukraine: Member 2nd Class of the Order of Prince Yaroslav the Wise

== Notes ==
Political offices
Preceded by Viktoras Pranckietis	Speaker of the Seimas; 2020–present	Incumbent
Party political offices
Preceded by Eugenijus Gentvilas	Leader of the Liberal Movement; 2019–present	Incumbent
