= Amina Mezioud =

Algerian chess player

Amina (born 1988) is an Algerian chess player, and a woman grandmaster.

She won the Women's Arab Chess Championship in 2006, and has competed in the Women's World Chess Championship three times, in 2006, 2010 and 2012.

She competed in the Women's World Chess Championship 2015 (knock-out), seeded #62 (of 64).
