= Yelena Dembo =

Greek chess player (born 1983)

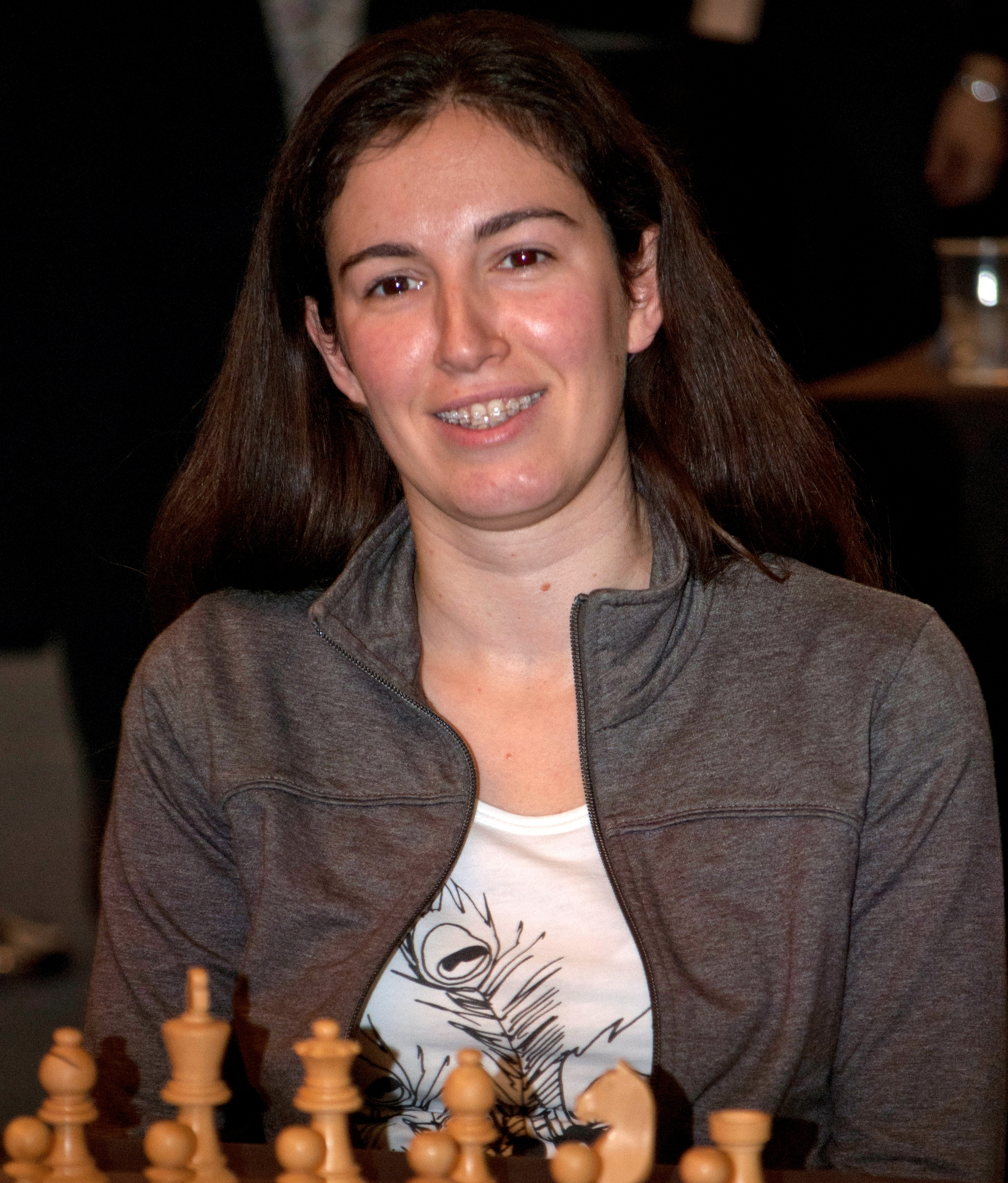
- Dembo in 2011

Personal information
- Born: December 8, 1983 (age 42) Penza, Russian SFSR, USSR

Chess career
- Country: Israel; Hungary; Greece
- Title: International Master (2003); Woman Grandmaster (2001)
- FIDE rating: 2448 (July 2026)
- Peak rating: 2482 (September 2009)

Yelena Vladimirovna Dembo (born December 8, 1983) is a Greek chess player, who holds the titles of International Master and Woman Grandmaster. She is also a chess teacher and author.

== Family background ==
Dembo was born on December 8, 1983, in Penza, Russia. She first began to read when she was two and a half years old and at the age of three years and nine months, played for the first time in a chess tournament among boys under twelve, enabling her to become a rated chess-player.

Dembo's mother Nadezhda Fokina is a USSR Master of Sports in chess, a linguist, chess journalist and trainer. In the past she won gold and silver medals in the USSR Chess Championships and was Russian Champion at 'Under 20' level in 1967. She also played for Israel at the 1992 Chess Olympiad in Manila, Philippines. Dembo's father is a professional pianist, who graduated from Leningrad Academy of Music, but is also a chess trainer, journalist and psychologist. He has been her trainer ever since she was three years old.

When she was seven years old her family emigrated to Israel. She was Israeli girls' champion five times, including once in the 'Under 20' category.

== Chess and coaching career ==
Much of her time is spent working as a chess coach. Her parents created a chess academy.

While living in Hungary between 2001 and 2003, she won the Hungarian Women's Championship. She became a woman grandmaster (WGM) when she was seventeen years old, and an international master (IM) at age nineteen. At the end of 2003 she moved to Athens, Greece, where she married Sotiris Logothetis in 2004.

She has eight medals from World and European championships, including the 2002 European Rapid Championship gold medal for girls 'Under 20', gained in Novi Sad and, most significantly, the bronze medal from the Women's European Individual Chess Championship (held Moldova, 2005). At the 2008 EU Individual Open Chess Championship held in Liverpool, she shared the prize for 'highest placed woman' with Jovanka Houska and Ketevan Arakhamia-Grant.

Dembo has participated in men's and women's leagues in the following countries: Israel, Croatia, Hungary, Germany, UK, Yugoslavia, Greece and Turkey. At Olympiads and at the European Team Chess Championships, she has represented both Hungary and Greece.

== Books ==
She is also a writer on chess and has produced the following English-language books for the publisher Everyman Chess:

- The Very Unusual Book About Chess
- Conversation with a Professional Trainer - Methods of Positional Play
- Play the Grünfeld, ISBN 978-1-85744-521-3.
- Fighting the Anti-King's Indians: How to Handle White's Tricky Ways of Avoiding the Main Lines, 2008, ISBN 978-1-85744-575-6
