= Ekaterina Kovalevskaya =

Russian chess player (born 1974)

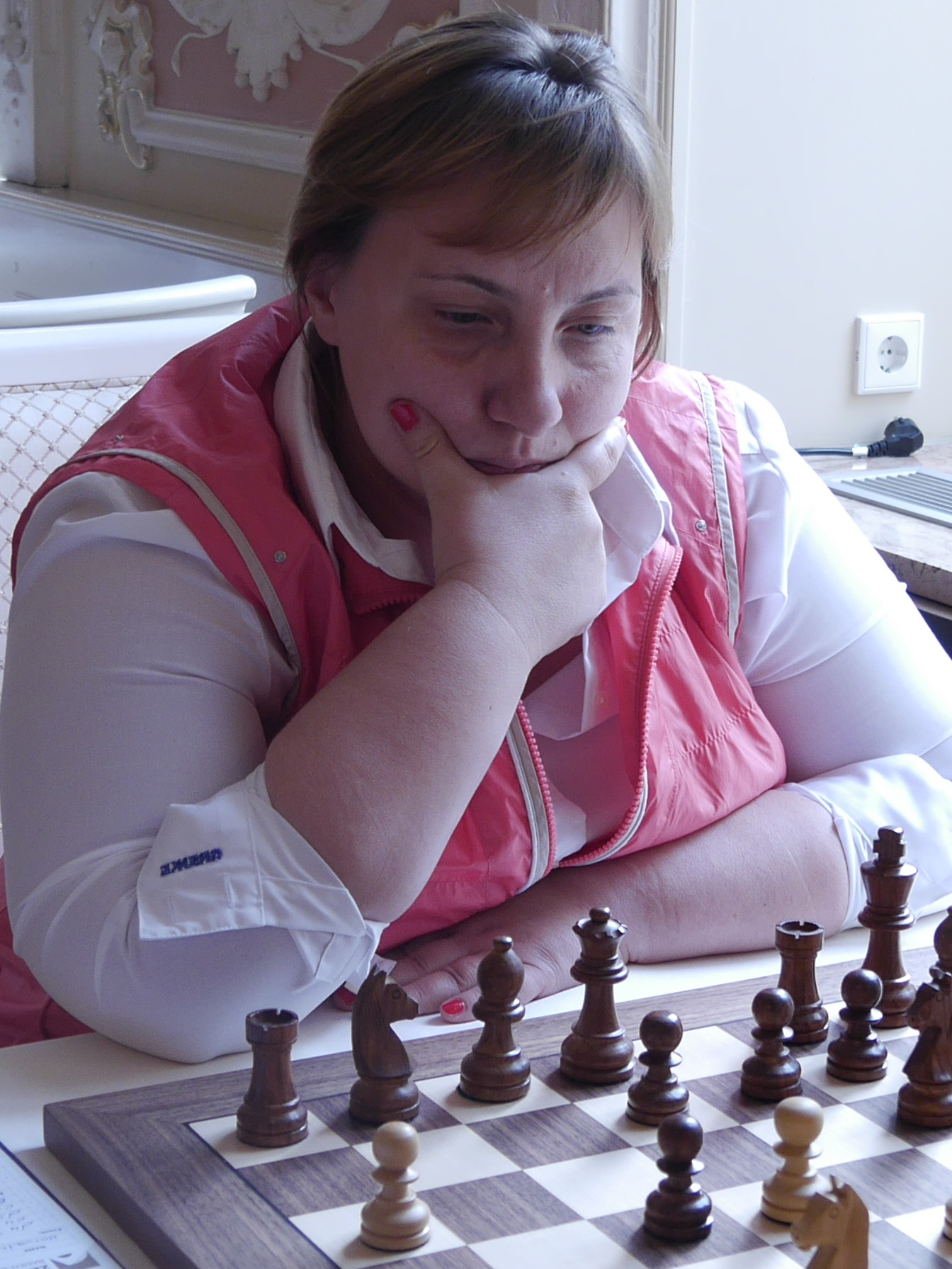
- Kovalevskaya in 2016

Personal information
- Born: 17 April 1974 (age 52) Rostov-on-Don, Russian SFSR, Soviet Union

Chess career
- Country: Russia
- Title: International Master (2004); Woman Grandmaster (1998)
- Peak rating: 2507 (July 2001)

Ekaterina Kovalevskaya (Russian: Екатерина Ковалевская; born 17 April 1974, in Rostov-on-Don) is a Russian chess player with the FIDE titles of International Master (IM) and Woman Grandmaster (WGM). She won the Russian Women's Chess Championship in 1994 and 2000 and was the runner-up in the Women's World Chess Championship 2004. This latter achievement earned her the title of International Master.

Kovalevskaya won the silver medal at the Women's European Individual Chess Championship in 2000 and 2001.

She played for the Russian national team at the Women's Chess Olympiads of 1994, 1998, 2000, 2002, 2004, 2006, at the Women's World Team Chess Championships of 2007, 2009 and at the Women's European Team Chess Championships of 2005 and 2007.
