= Marie Sebag =

French chess grandmaster (born 1986)

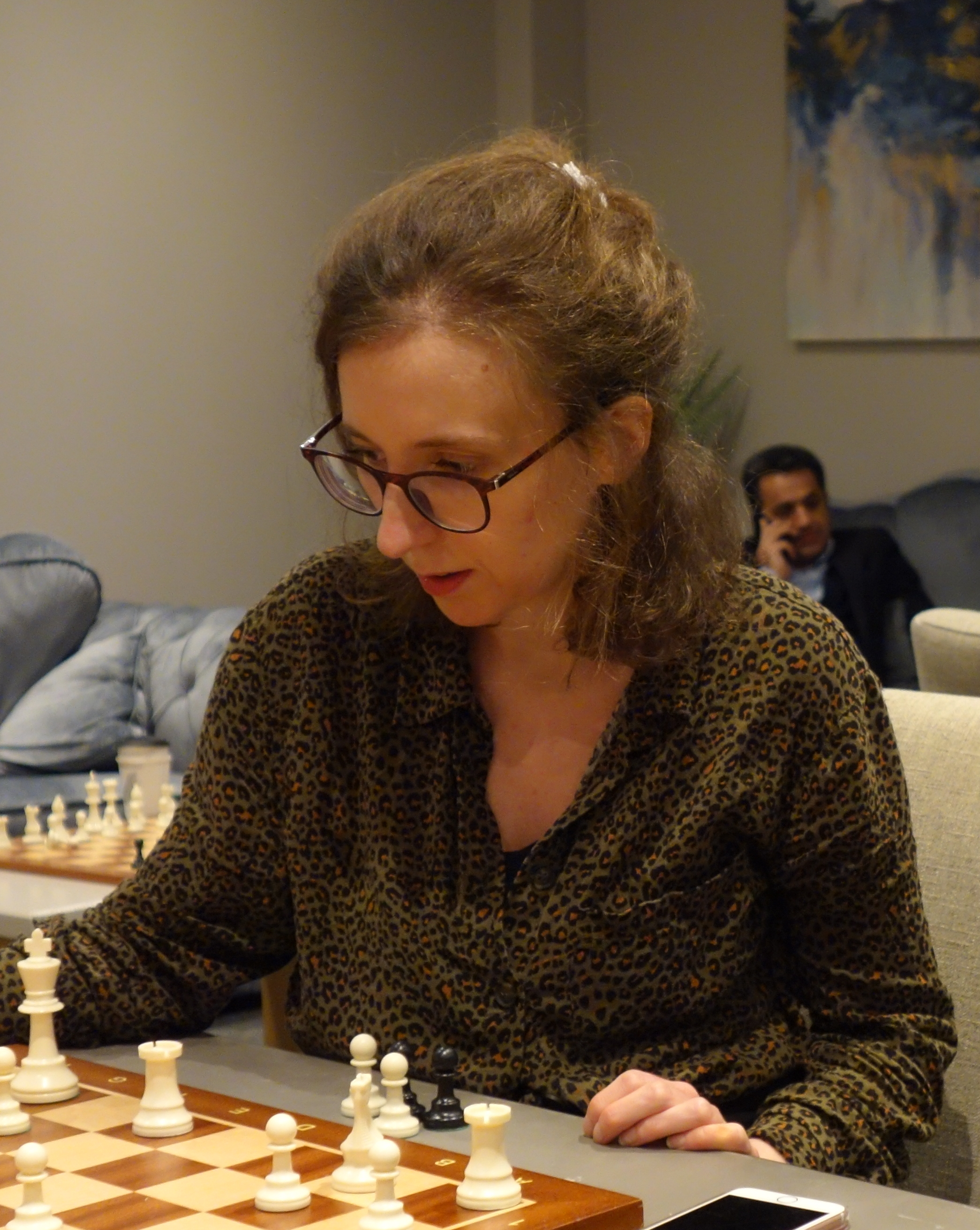
- Marie Sebag in 2019

Personal information
- Born: Marie Rachel Sebag; 15 October 1986 (age 39) Paris, France

Chess career
- Country: France
- Title: Grandmaster (2008)
- FIDE rating: 2417 (July 2026)
- Peak rating: 2537 (March 2013)

Marie Rachel Sebag (born 15 October 1986) is a French chess grandmaster. She is a two-time French Women's Chess Champion.

== Tournament results ==
In 1998 Sebag won the European Youth Chess Championship (girls under-12), a feat she repeated the next year (girls U14) and in 2002 (girls U16). In 2004, she shared first place in the World Youth Chess Championship in the category girls U18 with Jolanta Zawadzka, who defeated her in the tie-break. In 2006, she reached the quarter-finals during the Women's World Chess Championship, in which she lost to Svetlana Matveeva.

== Titles ==
Sebag was already an IM and a WGM when she scored her second GM norm during the Hogeschool Zeeland tournament in Vlissingen in August 2007, where she won a game against former FIDE World Champion Rustam Kasimdzhanov. By securing a third norm during the European Individual Chess Championship, she qualified for the title of Grandmaster in May 2008.
