= Alisa Galliamova =

Russian chess player (born 1972)

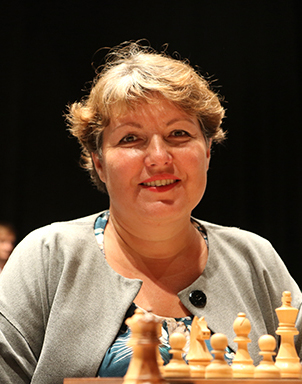
- Galliamova in 2018

Personal information
- Born: Alisa Mikhailovna Galliamova; 18 January 1972 (age 54) Kazan, Tatar ASSR, Russian SFSR, Soviet Union
- Spouse: Vasyl Ivanchuk (m. 1991; div. 1996)

Chess career
- Country: Soviet Union (until 1991); Ukraine (1992–1996); Russia (since 1996)
- Title: International Master (1993); Woman Grandmaster (1988)
- Peak rating: 2560 (July 1998)

Alisa Mikhailovna Galliamova (Russian: Алиса Михайловна Галлямова, Tatar: Алисә Михаил кызы Галләмова; born 18 January 1972) is a Russian chess player who holds the FIDE titles of International Master (IM) and Woman Grandmaster (WGM). She is twice runner-up at the Women's World Chess Championship, in 1999 and 2006, and three-time Russian women's champion (1997, 2009, 2010). She was known as "Alisa Galliamova-Ivanchuk" from 1993 to 2001.

She played for the gold medal-winning Russian team at the 2010 Women's Chess Olympiad and for the gold medal-winning Ukrainian team in the 1992 Women's European Team Chess Championship.

== Career ==
Galliamova won the World Under-16 Girls' Championship in 1987 and 1988. In 1988 she also won the World Junior Girls Championship.

She won the 1992 European Team Championship, got two silver medals at the 1990 and 1992 Chess Olympiads, as well as bronze in 1996. She also won multiple personal championships in Russia.

=== Women's World Chess Championship 1999 ===
In December 1997, she won the Candidates Tournament for the Women's World Chess Championship held in Groningen, Netherlands. She was scheduled to play a match with Xie Jun (who finished second in the 1997 Candidates Tournament) in August 1998, and the winner of that match was supposed to play a match in November 1998 with Zsuzsa Polgar for the Women's World Chess Championship.

However, after the match with Xie Jun had already been scheduled, Galliamova objected because the entire match was scheduled to be played in China, the home of her rival. The reason for this was because only China had bid for the match. Galliamova wanted half of the match to be played in Kazan, Russia. However, the Russians did not have the money required. Finally, when Galliamova failed to show up to play the match, the match was declared forfeited to Xie Jun.

FIDE then scheduled a match between Xie Jun and Zsuzsa Polgar for November 1998. However, Polgar said that she could not play at that time because she was pregnant. After Polgar had given birth to her first son, Tom, in March 1999, FIDE again tried to schedule a match. This time Polgar said that she could not play the match because she was nursing.

Finally, after repeated efforts to organize a match which was supposed to have taken place in 1998, FIDE declared that Polgar had forfeited her title and that the title was vacant. FIDE decided to let Galliamova back into the cycle and held a match between Xie Jun and Galliamova for the Women's World Chess Championship 1999. This time, Galliamova was willing to play because her original demand had been met in that Russia had come up with the money to sponsor half of the match. The match was held in Kazan, Russia, and Shenyang, China, in August 1999, and Xie Jun won with a score of 8.5–6.5.

=== Further career ===
In March 2006, Galliamova again reached the finals of the FIDE Women's World Championship, competing against Xu Yuhua.

In 2017, she was third in the European Women's Championship in Riga.

== Personal life ==
She was born to Russian father and Tatar mother (Galliamova is the last name of her mother).

Galliamova was married to Ukrainian Grandmaster Vasyl Ivanchuk, one of the top rated players in the world. The couple had a son, Michael. The marriage ended in a divorce in 1996.

Since 2005, the Children's Chess Tournament - Alisa Galliamova Cup - has been held in Tatarstan. Galliamova founded the Children's Chess School, which holds annual sports camps for the republic's most talented children.
