= List of chess players by peak FIDE rating =

This list of chess players is ordered by their peak FIDE rating, an implementation of the Elo rating introduced by FIDE in 1971. The cut-off value is 2700 for men (players with a rating at or above this value are colloquially known as super grandmasters) and 2500 for women.

Only six players achieved their over-2700 peak before the year 2000 and twenty-one players achieved their respective peak between 2000 and 2009 (inclusive).

== Classical ==
FIDE players ordered by peak Elo rating
	Country	Player	Peak rating	Achieved	Birth year	Death year	Notes
=== 2800+ ===
1	Norway	Magnus Carlsen	2882	2014-05	1990		World no. 1 (2010, 2011, 2011–), world champion (2013–2023)
2	Soviet Union; Russia	Garry Kasparov	2851	1999-07	1963		World champion (1985–2000), world no. 1 (1984–1993, 1995–2006), first player to achieve 2800+ rating (1990)
3	Italy; United States	Fabiano Caruana	2844	2014-10	1992		
4	Armenia; Germany; United States	Levon Aronian	2830	2014-03	1982		
5	Philippines; United States	Wesley So	2822	2017-02	1993		
6	Azerbaijan	Shakhriyar Mamedyarov	2820	2018-09	1985		
7	France	Maxime Vachier-Lagrave	2819	2016-08	1990		
8	India	Viswanathan Anand	2817	2011-03	1969		World champion (2000–2002, 2007–2013), world no. 1 (2007, 2008, 2010, 2011)
8	Soviet Union; Russia	Vladimir Kramnik	2817	2016-10	1975		World champion (2000–2006), world no. 1 (1996, 2008)
10	Bulgaria	Veselin Topalov	2816	2015-07	1975		World champion (2005–2006), world no. 1 (2006–2007, 2008–2009)
10	United States	Hikaru Nakamura	2816	2015-10	1987		
10	China	Ding Liren	2816	2018-11	1992		World champion (2023–2024)
13	Russia	Alexander Grischuk	2810	2014-12	1983		
14	Iran; France	Alireza Firouzja	2804	2021-12	2003		Youngest player to achieve 2800+ rating
15	India	Arjun Erigaisi	2801	2024-12	2003		
=== 2775–2799 ===
16	Russia; Netherlands	Anish Giri	2798	2015-10	1994		
17	Russia	Ian Nepomniachtchi	2795	2023-03	1990		
18	India	Gukesh Dommaraju	2794	2024-10	2006		World champion (2024–)
19	Azerbaijan	Teimour Radjabov	2793	2012-11	1987		
20	Russia	Alexander Morozevich	2788	2008-07	1977		
20	Ukraine; Russia	Sergey Karjakin	2788	2011-07	1990		
22	Soviet Union; Ukraine	Vasyl Ivanchuk	2787	2007-10	1969		
23	United States	Bobby Fischer	2785	1972-07	1943	2008	World champion (1972–1975), world no. 1 (1971–1975), first player to achieve 2700+ rating
23	India	Rameshbabu Praggnanandhaa	2785	2025-09	2005		
25	Uzbekistan	Nodirbek Abdusattorov	2783	2024-10	2004		
26	Uzbekistan	Javokhir Sindarov	2782	2026-10	2005		
27	Soviet Union; Russia	Anatoly Karpov	2780	1994-07	1951		World champion (1975–1985, 1993–1999), world no. 1 (1976–1983, 1985, 1994)
28	Soviet Union; Belarus; Israel	Boris Gelfand	2777	2013-11	1968		
29	Hungary; Romania	Richárd Rapport	2776	2022-04	1996		
29	Germany	Vincent Keymer	2776	2025-12	2004		
=== 2750–2774 ===
31	India	Pentala Harikrishna	2770	2016-12	1986		
32	Soviet Union; Russia	Peter Svidler	2769	2013-05	1976		
33	Cuba; United States	Leinier Domínguez	2768	2014-05	1983		
34	Ukraine	Pavel Eljanov	2765	2016-03	1983		
34	China	Yu Yangyi	2765	2018-09	1994		
36	Ukraine	Ruslan Ponomariov	2764	2011-07	1983		World champion (2002–2004)
37	Hungary	Peter Leko	2763	2005-04	1979		
37	Soviet Union; United States; France	Gata Kamsky	2763	2013-07	1974		
37	China	Wang Hao	2763	2020-04	1989		
37	China	Wei Yi	2763	2024-10	1999		
41	Azerbaijan	Vugar Gashimov	2761	2012-01	1986	2014	
41	England	Michael Adams	2761	2013-09	1971		
41	Russia	Vladislav Artemiev	2761	2019-06	1998		
44	Russia	Dmitry Jakovenko	2760	2009-01	1983		
44	Poland	Jan-Krzysztof Duda	2760	2021-12	1998		
46	Russia	Evgeny Tomashevsky	2758	2015-09	1987		
46	China	Li Chao	2758	2016-06	1989		
48	China	Wang Yue	2756	2010-11	1987		
49	Soviet Union; Latvia; Spain	Alexei Shirov	2755	2008-01	1972		
50	Georgia; Czech Republic; Slovakia; Armenia	Sergei Movsesian	2751	2009-01	1978		
50	Czech Republic	David Navara	2751	2015-05	1985		
50	Russia; England	Nikita Vitiugov	2751	2019-11	1987		
53	Poland	Radosław Wojtaszek	2750	2017-01	1987		
=== 2725–2749 ===
54	France	Étienne Bacrot	2749	2013-11	1983		
54	India	Aravindh Chithambaram	2749	2025-04	1999		
56	India	Vidit Gujrathi	2747	2024-02	1994		
57	Russia	Dmitry Andreikin	2743	2016-06	1990		
58	Iran	Parham Maghsoodloo	2742	2023-12	2000		
58	United States	Hans Niemann	2742	2026-05	2003		
60	Vietnam	Lê Quang Liêm	2741	2024-08	1991		
61	Soviet Union; Russia; Canada	Evgeny Bareev	2739	2003-10	1966		
61	Russia; Slovenia	Vladimir Fedoseev	2739	2025-03	1995		
63	Russia	Maxim Matlakov	2738	2017-11	1991		
64	Latvia; Germany; Azerbaijan; Bulgaria	Arkadij Naiditsch	2737	2013-12	1985		
64	Iran	Amin Tabatabaei	2737	2026-09	2001		
66	Netherlands	Jorden van Foreest	2736	2026-04	1999		
67	Hungary	Judit Polgár	2735	2005-07	1976		Highest-ranked female player; first and only female player to achieve 2700+ rating, only female player to be ranked in the world's top 10
68	Soviet Union; Moldova	Viktor Bologan	2734	2012-08	1971		
68	Georgia	Baadur Jobava	2734	2012-09	1983		
70	Russia	Vladimir Malakhov	2732	2010-07	1980		
70	Kyrgyzstan; Russia	Ernesto Inarkiev	2732	2016-09	1985		
72	China	Bu Xiangzhi	2731	2019-02	1985		
72	United States	Samuel Shankland	2731	2019-02	1991		
72	Turkey	Yağız Kaan Erdoğmuş	2731	2026-10	2011		Youngest player to achieve 2700+ rating
75	Hungary	Zoltán Almási	2726	2011-07	1976		
75	Ukraine	Alexander Moiseenko	2726	2011-09	1980		
77	Russia; Israel	Evgeny Alekseev	2725	2009-09	1985		
77	Ukraine	Andrei Volokitin	2725	2013-03	1986		
=== 2700–2724 ===
79	China	Ni Hua	2724	2009-04	1983		
79	Spain	Francisco Vallejo Pons	2724	2011-07	1982		
81	Ukraine	Anton Korobov	2723	2014-01	1985		
81	Russia	Andrey Esipenko	2723	2022-03	2002		
81	India	Nihal Sarin	2723	2026-04	2004		
84	India	Krishnan Sasikiran	2720	2012-05	1981		
84	Russia	Alexander Riazantsev	2720	2012-07	1985		
84	Ukraine	Alexander Areshchenko	2720	2012-12	1986		
84	France	Laurent Fressinet	2720	2015-06	1981		
84	Russia	Daniil Dubov	2720	2021-12	1996		
89	United States	Awonder Liang	2719	2026-02	2003		
90	Bulgaria; Georgia	Ivan Cheparinov	2718	2018-08	1986		
91	Cuba; United States	Lázaro Bruzón	2717	2012-10	1982		
91	Ukraine	Yuriy Kryvoruchko	2717	2015-11	1986		
91	Russia; Serbia	Alexey Sarana	2717	2024-07	2000		
94	Soviet Union; Russia	Valery Salov	2715	1995-01	1964		
94	Uzbekistan	Rustam Kasimdzhanov	2715	2015-05	1979		World champion (2004–2005)
94	Russia; Austria	Kirill Alekseenko	2715	2019-11	1997		
97	Netherlands	Loek van Wely	2714	2001-10	1972		
97	Russia	Denis Khismatullin	2714	2014-03	1984		
99	Soviet Union; Armenia; United States	Vladimir Akopian	2713	2006-07	1971		
99	England	Luke McShane	2713	2012-07	1984		
101	England	Nigel Short	2712	2004-04	1965		
101	England	David Howell	2712	2015-08	1990		
101	Egypt	Bassem Amin	2712	2019-01	1988		Only African player to achieve 2700+ rating
101	United States	Jeffery Xiong	2712	2019-11	2000		
101	Russia; Hungary	Sanan Sjugirov	2712	2022-11	1993		
101	Uzbekistan	Nodirbek Yakubboev	2712	2026-10	2002		
107	Soviet Union; Russia	Alexey Dreev	2711	2011-07	1969		
107	Armenia	Gabriel Sargissian	2711	2022-09	1983		
109	Soviet Union; Ukraine; Slovenia	Alexander Beliavsky	2710	1997-07	1953		
109	Russia; Romania	Alexander Motylev	2710	2009-07	1979		
109	Israel	Maxim Rodshtein	2710	2016-03	1989		
109	Romania	Bogdan-Daniel Deac	2710	2022-09	2001		
113	Azerbaijan	Rauf Mamedov	2709	2017-12	1988		
113	England	Gawain Jones	2709	2019-06	1987		
115	Ukraine	Zahar Efimenko	2708	2011-03	1985		
115	Armenia	Haik M. Martirosyan	2708	2023-11	2000		
115	United States	Samuel Sevian	2708	2026-09	2000		
118	Romania; Germany	Liviu-Dieter Nisipeanu	2707	2005-10	1976		
118	Russia	Evgeniy Najer	2707	2017-08	1977		
120	Yugoslavia; Bosnia and Herzegovina; Netherlands	Ivan Sokolov	2706	2004-01	1968		
120	Hungary	Ferenc Berkes	2706	2011-09	1985		
120	Soviet Union; Russia	Sergei Rublevsky	2706	2013-11	1974		
123	Soviet Union; Latvia	Mikhail Tal	2705	1980-01	1936	1992	World champion (1960–1961)
123	Soviet Union; Russia; Israel; Switzerland	Vadim Milov	2705	2008-07	1972		
123	Russia	Boris Grachev	2705	2012-03	1986		
123	Norway	Jon Ludvig Hammer	2705	2016-02	1990		
127	Czech Republic	Viktor Láznička	2704	2012-01	1989		
127	United States	Ray Robson	2704	2023-04	1994		
129	Soviet Union; Israel	Emil Sutovsky	2703	2012-01	1977		
129	Austria	Markus Ragger	2703	2017-02	1988		
129	Belarus	Vladislav Kovalev	2703	2019-02	1994		
129	Croatia	Ivan Šarić	2703	2019-03	1990		
129	Spain	David Antón Guijarro	2703	2020-03	1995		
134	Soviet Union; Russia; Poland	Michał Krasenkow	2702	2000-07	1963		
134	Soviet Union; Israel	Ilya Smirin	2702	2001-07	1968		
134	Soviet Union; Germany; Russia	Alexander Khalifman	2702	2001-10	1966		World champion (1999–2000)
134	Soviet Union; Bosnia and Herzegovina; Georgia	Zurab Azmaiparashvili	2702	2003-07	1960		
134	France	Romain Edouard	2702	2014-06	1990		
134	Ukraine; Latvia	Igor Kovalenko	2702	2015-08	1988		
140	Soviet Union; Ukraine; United States	Alexander Onischuk	2701	2010-07	1975		
140	India	Adhiban Baskaran	2701	2019-04	1992		
142	Denmark	Peter Heine Nielsen	2700	2010-07	1973		
142	Russia	Igor Lysyj	2700	2015-01	1987		

== Highest-rated female players ==
FIDE women players ordered by peak Elo rating
	Country	Player	Peak rating	Achieved	Birth year	Death year	Notes
=== 2700+ ===
1	Hungary	Judit Polgár	2735	2005-07	1976		Highest-ranked female player, female world no. 1 (1989–2015)
=== 2600–2699 ===
2	China	Hou Yifan	2686	2015-03	1994		Women's world champion (2010–2012, 2013–2015, 2016–2017), youngest female grandmaster (since 2008), female world no. 1 (since 2015)
3	India	Koneru Humpy	2623	2009-07	1987		
4	Russia	Aleksandra Goryachkina	2611	2021-08	1998		
5	Ukraine; Slovenia	Anna Muzychuk	2606	2012-07	1990		
6	China	Ju Wenjun	2604	2017-03	1991		Women's World Chess Champion (since 2018)
=== 2500–2599 ===
7	Russia	Tatiana Kosintseva	2581	2010-11	1986		
8	China	Zhao Xue	2579	2013-09	1985		
8	China	Zhu Jiner	2579	2025-11	2002		
10	Hungary; United States	Susan Polgar	2577	2005-01	1969		Women's world champion (1996–1999), female world no. 1 (1984–1985, 1986)
11	Russia	Nadezhda Kosintseva	2576	2010-11	1985		
12	China	Xie Jun	2574	2008-01	1970		Women's world champion (1991–1996, 1999–2001)
13	Georgia	Nana Dzagnidze	2573	2015-06	1987		
14	China	Lei Tingjie	2569	2025-11	1997		
15	Ukraine	Mariya Muzychuk	2563	2016-03	1992		Women's world champion (2015–2016)
15	Ukraine; Russia	Kateryna Lagno	2563	2022-10	1989		
17	Russia; Switzerland	Alexandra Kosteniuk	2561	2018-01	1984		Women's world champion (2008–2010)
17	China	Tan Zhongyi	2561	2024-12	1991		Women's world champion (2017–2018)
19	Soviet Union; Georgia	Maia Chiburdanidze	2560	1988-01	1961		Women's world champion (1978–1991), female world no. 1 (1980–1982, 1983, 1985–1986, 1987–1988)
19	Soviet Union; Ukraine; Russia	Alisa Galliamova	2560	1998-07	1972		
19	Bulgaria	Antoaneta Stefanova	2560	2003-01	1979		Women's world champion (2004–2006)
22	Sweden	Pia Cramling	2550	2008-10	1963		Female world no. 1 (1983, 1984)
23	China; Qatar	Zhu Chen	2548	2008-01	1976		Women's world champion (2001–2004)
23	Russia	Valentina Gunina	2548	2015-06	1989		
25	India	Harika Dronavalli	2543	2016-11	1991		
26	Lithuania	Viktorija Čmilytė-Nielsen	2542	2017-06	1983		
27	Kazakhstan; Russia	Bibisara Assaubayeva	2538	2026-07	2004		
28	Ukraine; United States	Anna Zatonskih	2537	2011-05	1978		
28	France	Marie Sebag	2537	2013-03	1986		
30	Georgia	Bella Khotenashvili	2531	2013-06	1988		
31	Georgia	Nino Batsiashvili	2528	2018-03	1987		
32	Armenia	Elina Danielian	2521	2011-07	1978		
33	Soviet Union; Georgia	Nana Ioseliani	2520	1997-07	1962		
34	Kazakhstan	Dinara Saduakassova	2519	2020-01	1996		
35	China	Xu Yuhua	2517	2006-04	1976		Women's world champion (2006–2008)
36	Russia	Polina Shuvalova	2516	2021-12	2001		
37	Germany	Elisabeth Pähtz	2513	2018-09	1985		
38	China	Wang Lei	2512	2001-10	1975		
39	Vietnam; Hungary	Hoang Thanh Trang	2511	2013-11	1980		
40	India	Divya Deshmukh	2510	2026-04	2005		
41	Russia	Natalia Pogonina	2508	2014-07	1985		
42	Russia	Ekaterina Kovalevskaya	2507	2001-07	1974		
42	Kazakhstan	Zhansaya Abdumalik	2507	2021-10	2000		
44	Soviet Union; Georgia; Scotland	Ketevan Arakhamia-Grant	2506	2009-07	1968		
44	China	Wang Pin	2506	2000-10	1974		
44	India	Vaishali Rameshbabu	2506	2024-08	2001		
47	Hungary	Sofia Polgar	2505	1998-07	1974		
47	Poland	Monika Soćko	2505	2008-04	1978		
47	Russia	Olga Girya	2505	2017-09	1991		
47	Russia; Poland	Alina Kashlinskaya	2505	2022-06	1993		
51	Armenia	Lilit Mkrtchian	2503	2010-01	1982		
51	China	Ruan Lufei	2503	2014-01	1987		
53	Soviet Union; Kyrgyzstan; Russia	Svetlana Matveeva	2502	2004-01	1969		
53	Ukraine	Anna Ushenina	2502	2007-07	1985		Women's world champion (2012–2013)
53	United States	Irina Krush	2502	2013-10	1983		
56	China	Qin Kanying	2501	2000-07	1974		
56	Moldova; France	Almira Skripchenko	2501	2003-01	1976		
58	Georgia	Lela Javakhishvili	2500	2010-03	1984		

== Highest ratings by decade ==
This section lists the top 20 active (Note: FIDE considers a player active if they played a rated game within the past 12 months.) players by peak FIDE rating achieved in every decade since 1971, when FIDE started officially publishing rating lists.

=== 1970s ===
Chess players ordered by peak FIDE rating in 1970s
	Country	Player	Peak rating in 1970s	Achieved
1	United States	Bobby Fischer	2785	1972-07
2	Soviet Union	Anatoly Karpov	2725	1978-01
3	Soviet Union; Switzerland	Viktor Korchnoi	2695	1979-01
4	Soviet Union	Boris Spassky	2690	1971-07
5	Denmark	Bent Larsen	2660	1971-07
5	Soviet Union	Mikhail Tal	2660	1973-07
7	Hungary	Lajos Portisch	2650	1973-07
8	Soviet Union	Tigran Petrosian	2645	1972-07
8	Soviet Union	Lev Polugaevsky	2645	1972-07
10	Brazil	Henrique Mecking	2635	1977-01
11	Soviet Union	Mikhail Botvinnik	2630	1971-07
12	Czechoslovakia; United States	Lubomir Kavalek	2625	1974-05
12	Netherlands	Jan Timman	2625	1979-01
14	Soviet Union	Vassily Smyslov	2620	1971-07
14	Soviet Union	Leonid Stein	2620	1972-07
14	Yugoslavia	Ljubomir Ljubojević	2620	1976-01
14	Soviet Union	Efim Geller	2620	1976-01
14	Czechoslovakia	Vlastimil Hort	2620	1977-01
19	Soviet Union	Paul Keres	2615	1971-07
19	West Germany	Robert Hübner	2615	1974-05
19	Czechoslovakia	Jan Smejkal	2615	1976-01

=== 1980s ===
Chess players ordered by peak FIDE rating in 1980s
	Country	Player	Peak rating in 1980s	Achieved
1	Soviet Union	Garry Kasparov	2775	1989-01
2	Soviet Union	Anatoly Karpov	2755	1989-07
3	Soviet Union	Mikhail Tal	2705	1980-01
4	Switzerland	Viktor Korchnoi	2695	1980-01
5	Netherlands	Jan Timman	2675	1988-01
6	England	Nigel Short	2665	1988-07
7	Soviet Union	Artur Yusupov	2660	1986-07
7	Soviet Union	Vasyl Ivanchuk	2660	1989-07
9	Hungary	Lajos Portisch	2655	1980-01
9	Soviet Union	Alexander Beliavsky	2655	1988-07
11	Yugoslavia	Ljubomir Ljubojević	2645	1983-01
11	Soviet Union	Rafael Vaganian	2645	1986-01
11	Soviet Union	Andrei Sokolov	2645	1987-01
11	England	Jonathan Speelman	2645	1988-07
11	Soviet Union	Valery Salov	2645	1989-07
16	West Germany	Robert Hübner	2640	1981-07
16	Sweden	Ulf Andersson	2640	1983-07
16	Soviet Union	Mikhail Gurevich	2640	1989-07
19	Soviet Union	Lev Polugaevsky	2635	1980-01
19	Soviet Union; France	Boris Spassky	2635	1981-01

=== 1990s ===
Chess players ordered by peak FIDE rating in 1990s
	Country	Player	Peak rating in 1990s	Achieved
1	Soviet Union; Russia	Garry Kasparov	2851	1999-07
2	India	Viswanathan Anand	2795	1998-07
3	Soviet Union; Russia	Vladimir Kramnik	2790	1998-01
4	Soviet Union; Russia	Anatoly Karpov	2780	1994-07
5	Russia	Alexander Morozevich	2758	1999-07
6	Bulgaria	Veselin Topalov	2750	1996-07
7	United States	Gata Kamsky	2745	1996-07
8	Soviet Union; Latvia; Spain	Alexei Shirov	2740	1994-07
8	Soviet Union; Ukraine	Vasyl Ivanchuk	2740	1995-07
10	England	Michael Adams	2716	1999-01
11	Soviet Union; Russia	Valery Salov	2715	1995-01
12	Soviet Union; Russia	Peter Svidler	2713	1999-01
12	Soviet Union; Belarus; Israel	Boris Gelfand	2713	1999-07
14	Soviet Union; Ukraine; Slovenia	Alexander Beliavsky	2710	1997-07
15	Hungary	Peter Leko	2701	1999-07
16	Soviet Union; Russia	Evgeny Bareev	2698	1999-07
17	England	Nigel Short	2697	1999-01
18	Soviet Union; Russia	Sergei Rublevsky	2685	1998-07
19	Soviet Union; Bosnia and Herzegovina; Georgia	Zurab Azmaiparashvili	2681	1999-01
20	Netherlands	Jan Timman	2680	1990-01
20	Soviet Union; Russia; Germany	Artur Yusupov	2680	1995-07

=== 2000s ===
Chess players ordered by peak FIDE rating in 2000s
	Country	Player	Peak rating in 2000s	Achieved
1	Russia	Garry Kasparov	2851	2000-01
2	Bulgaria	Veselin Topalov	2813	2006-07
3	Russia	Vladimir Kramnik	2811 (Note: The chart on Kramnik's FIDE profile gives his January 2002 rating as 2811. The top 100 list for January 2002 gives 2809. The discrepancy appears to be due to a delay in including the rating change of +2 from Kramnik's four draws with Garry Kasparov in the Botvinnik Memorial Match in December 2001 in the top 100 lists, where it only appears in October 2002.)	2002-01
4	India	Viswanathan Anand	2803	2006-04
5	Norway	Magnus Carlsen	2801	2009-11
6	Russia	Alexander Morozevich	2788	2008-07
7	Ukraine	Vasyl Ivanchuk	2787	2007-10
8	Armenia; Germany	Levon Aronian	2786	2009-11
9	Russia	Peter Svidler	2765	2006-01
10	Hungary	Peter Leko	2763	2005-04
11	Azerbaijan	Teimour Radjabov	2761	2009-01
12	Azerbaijan	Shakhriyar Mamedyarov	2760	2008-01
12	Russia	Dmitry Jakovenko	2760	2009-01
14	Azerbaijan	Vugar Gashimov	2758	2009-11
14	Israel	Boris Gelfand	2758	2009-11
16	Spain	Alexei Shirov	2755	2008-01
16	England	Michael Adams	2755	2000-07
18	Czech Republic; Slovakia	Sergei Movsesian	2751	2009-01
19	Russia	Alexander Grischuk	2748	2009-04
20	Ukraine	Ruslan Ponomariov	2743	2002-04

=== 2010s ===
Chess players ordered by peak FIDE rating in 2010s
	Country	Player	Peak rating in 2010s	Achieved
1	Norway	Magnus Carlsen	2882	2014-05
2	Italy; United States	Fabiano Caruana	2844	2014-10
3	Armenia	Levon Aronian	2830	2014-03
4	Philippines; United States	Wesley So	2822	2017-02
5	Azerbaijan	Shakhriyar Mamedyarov	2820	2018-09
6	France	Maxime Vachier-Lagrave	2819	2016-08
7	India	Viswanathan Anand	2817	2011-03
7	Russia	Vladimir Kramnik	2817	2016-10
9	Bulgaria	Veselin Topalov	2816	2015-07
9	United States	Hikaru Nakamura	2816	2015-10
9	China	Ding Liren	2816	2018-11
12	Russia	Alexander Grischuk	2810	2014-12
13	Netherlands	Anish Giri	2798	2015-10
14	Azerbaijan	Teimour Radjabov	2793	2012-11
15	Russia	Sergey Karjakin	2788	2011-07
16	Ukraine	Vasyl Ivanchuk	2779	2011-03
17	Israel	Boris Gelfand	2777	2013-11
18	Russia	Ian Nepomniachtchi	2776	2019-09
19	Russia	Alexander Morozevich	2770	2012-07
19	India	Pentala Harikrishna	2770	2016-12

=== 2020s ===
Chess players ordered by peak FIDE rating in 2020s
	Country	Player	Peak rating in 2020s	Achieved
1	Norway	Magnus Carlsen	2872	2020-01
2	United States	Fabiano Caruana	2842	2020-02
3	United States	Hikaru Nakamura	2816	2025-10
4	China	Ding Liren	2811	2022-10
5	France	Alireza Firouzja	2804	2021-12
6	India	Arjun Erigaisi	2801	2024-12
7	Russia	Ian Nepomniachtchi	2795	2023-03
8	India	Gukesh Dommaraju	2794	2024-10
9	Armenia; United States	Levon Aronian	2785	2022-03
9	India	Rameshbabu Praggnanandhaa	2785	2025-09
11	France	Maxime Vachier-Lagrave	2784	2020-10
12	Uzbekistan	Nodirbek Abdusattorov	2783	2024-10
13	Azerbaijan	Shakhriyar Mamedyarov	2782	2021-07
13	Uzbekistan	Javokhir Sindarov	2782	2026-10
15	Netherlands	Anish Giri	2780	2021-05
16	Russia	Alexander Grischuk	2778	2021-07
16	United States	Wesley So	2778	2021-09
18	Hungary; Romania	Richárd Rapport	2776	2022-04
18	Germany	Vincent Keymer	2776	2025-12
20	Azerbaijan	Teimour Radjabov	2765	2020-01

== List of rating peaks throughout history ==
Player	Rating	Achieved
Bobby Fischer	2760	1971-07
Bobby Fischer	2785	1972-07
Garry Kasparov	2800	1990-01
Garry Kasparov	2805	1993-01
Garry Kasparov	2815	1993-07
Garry Kasparov	2820	1997-07
Garry Kasparov	2825	1998-01
Garry Kasparov	2851	1999-07
Magnus Carlsen	2861	2013-01
Magnus Carlsen	2872	2013-02
Magnus Carlsen	2881	2014-03
Magnus Carlsen	2882	2014-05

== See also ==
- Comparison of top chess players throughout history
- FIDE world rankings
- List of FIDE chess world number ones
