= Muzychuk =

Muzychuk (Ukrainian: Музичук, Russian: Музычук) is a gender-neutral Ukrainian surname. People with that name include:

- Anna Muzychuk (born 1990), Ukrainian chess player, sister of Mariya
- Mariya Muzychuk (born 1992), Ukrainian chess player, sister of Anna
- Oleksandr Muzychuk (born 1973), Ukrainian law scientist, lawyer. Doctor of Law (2010), professor (2011), Honored Lawyer of Ukraine (2016).
