= Pogonin =

Pogonin (Russian: Погонин) is a Russian masculine surname, its feminine counterpart is Pogonina. Notable people with the surname include:

- Mikhail Pogonin (born 1996), Russian football player
- Natalia Pogonina (born 1985), Russian chess player
