= Women's World Chess Championship 2016 =

Chess match between Mariya Muzychuk and Hou Yifan

	Defending champion	Challenger
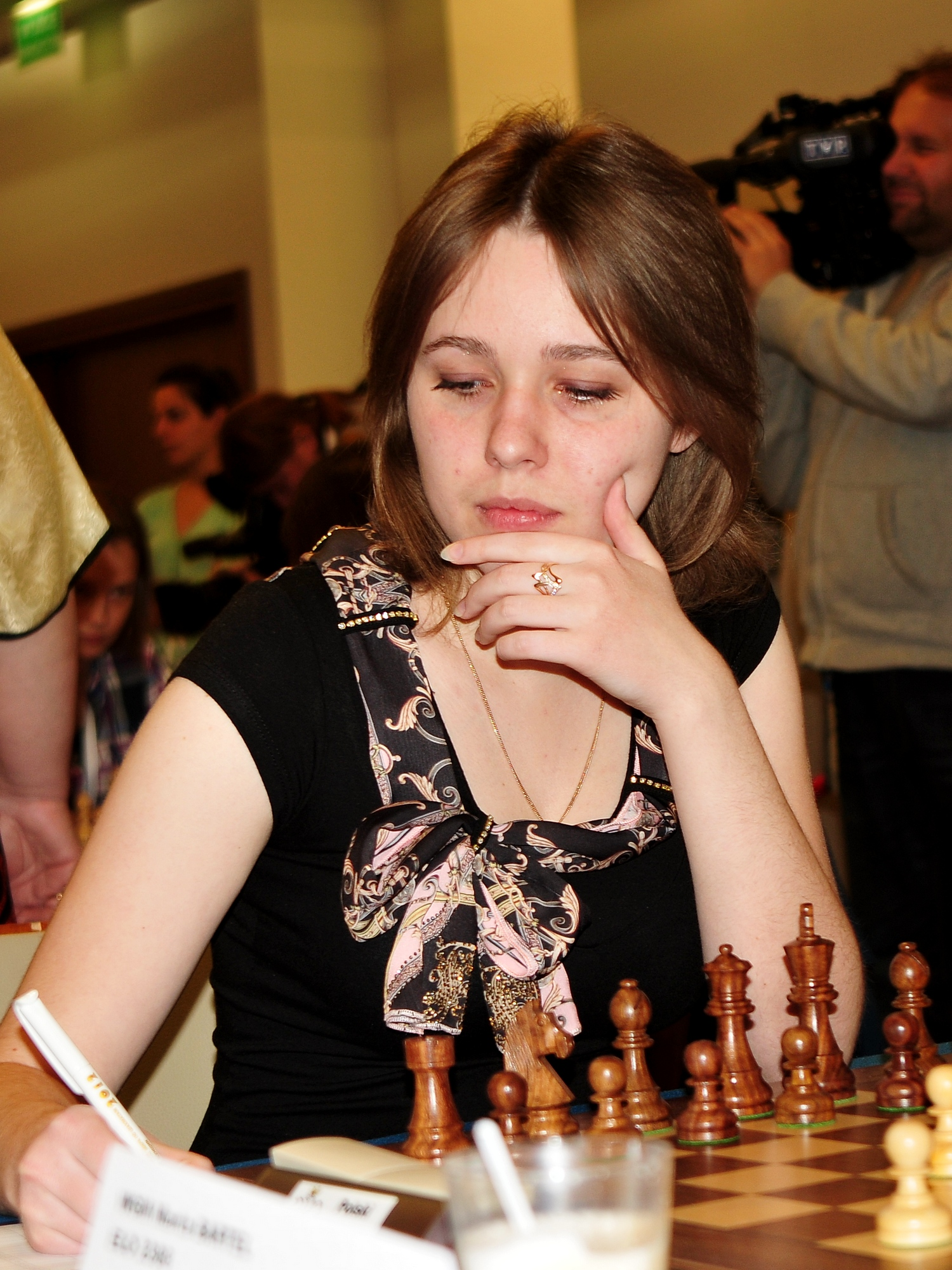
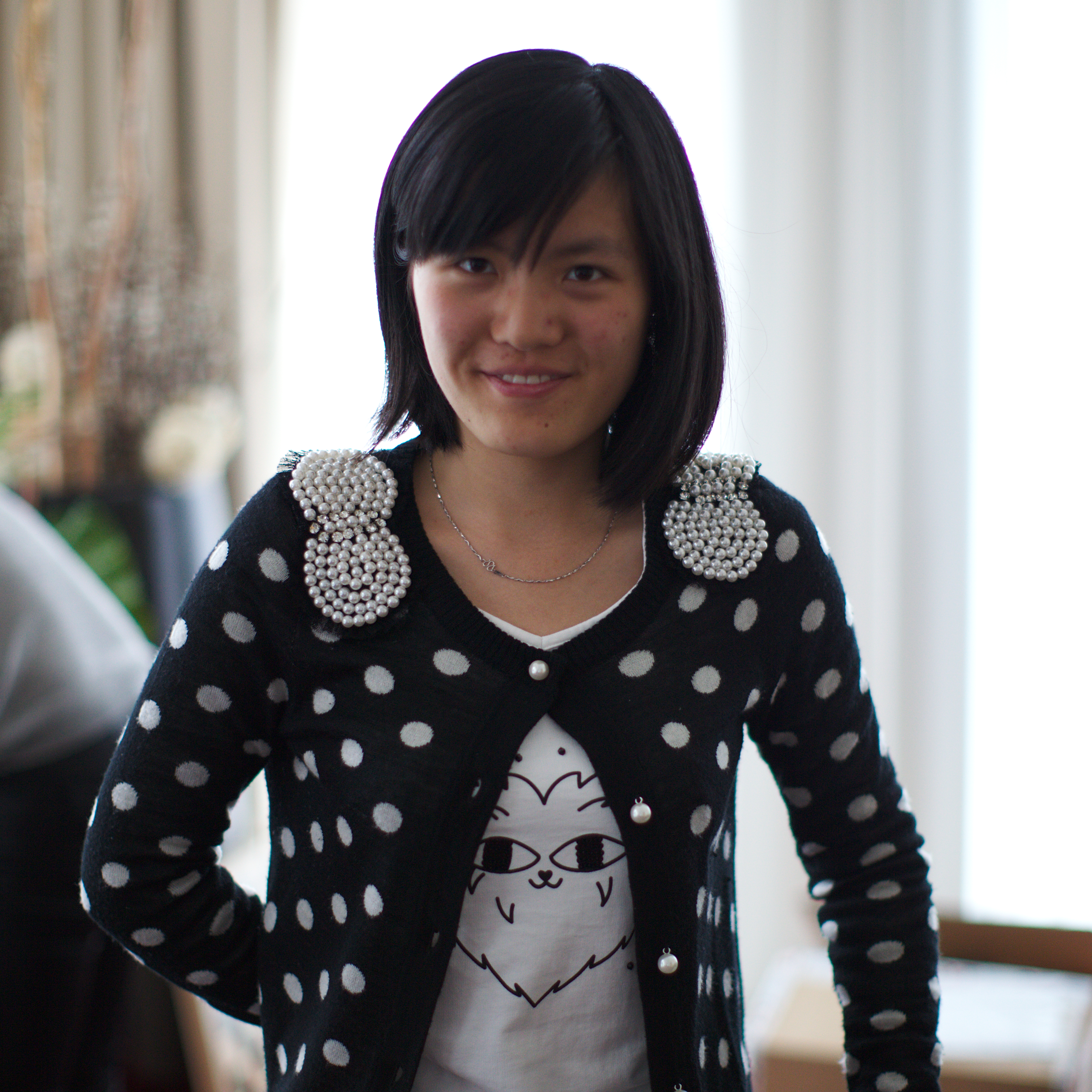
	(Ukraine) Mariya Muzychuk	(China) Hou Yifan
3	Scores	6
	Born 21 September 1992; 23 years old	Born 27 February 1994; 22 years old
	Winner of the 2015 World Championship	Winner of the 2013–14 Grand Prix
	Rating: 2563 (Women's World No. 4)	Rating: 2667 (Women's World No. 1)

The Women's World Chess Championship 2016 was a chess match played between Mariya Muzychuk, the defending champion, and the challenger Hou Yifan to determine the FIDE Women's World Champion. The scheduled 10-game match was held from 1 to 14 March 2016 in Lviv, Ukraine. It was originally scheduled from 11 to 31 October 2015, but was delayed because no host could be found.

On March 14, Hou won the championship by defeating Muzychuk in Game 9, ending the match. As in her two previous championship matches, Hou Yifan won convincingly, not losing a single game.

== Qualifying ==
=== 2015 World Championship ===
The 2015 World Championship was a 64-player knockout tournament in Sochi, Russia, starting on 15 March. Hou Yifan did not enter the tournament, and so relinquished the title. The highest rated player was Humpy Koneru, but she was eliminated in the quarterfinals. The final was won by Mariya Muzychuk, who beat Natalia Pogonina 2.5–1.5.

=== 2013–14 Grand Prix ===
The challenger qualified by winning the 2013–14 FIDE Women's Grand Prix. The Grand Prix consisted of six single tournaments, with each player taking part in four of these. The first stage was won by Bela Khotenashvili. Humpy Koneru then won the second and third stage to take the overall points lead. After Hou Yifan won the fourth and fifth stage, only she and Koneru Humpy were in contention for the overall win. Both ELO-rating favorites entered the sixth stage in Sharjah, UAE, with Humpy leading Hou Yifan by 5 points. Needing at least 55 points and to finish above Humpy, Hou Yifan secured the overall Grand Prix win in round nine of eleven.

== Head-to-head record and build-up ==
Prior to their 2016 World Championship match, Hou Yifan and Mariya Muzychik had played three standard games against each other. One ended in a draw, while the other two were won by Hou Yifan, both with the black pieces. In October 2015 both players participated in the first Grand Prix stage. Hou Yifan finished first, Muzychuk finished tied second. In the months before the tournament Mariya Muzychuk played in the men's edition of the Ukrainian championship in December 2015. That tournament was not only not broadcast live, but Muzychuk's games were not published at all. This was so as not to give Hou Yifan access to her games. Muzychuk finished tied 10th of 12 players. Hou Yifan played in the Tata Steel tournament in January 2016. After starting well with 3.5/6 she ended the tournament on 5/13, equal 12th in a field of 14.

== Host selection ==
The bidding process to host the match opened in February 2015. Bids had to be submitted by 20 April. FIDE then wanted to decide within 20 days among the bids, but no bid was successful. However, in June 2015, Kirsan Ilyumzhinov, the FIDE president, met with Andriy Sadovyi, the mayor of Lviv, Ukraine, to talk about the possibility of hosting the match. On July 1, 2015, it was announced that the match would be hosted in Lviv, Ukraine, starting in March 2016.

== Match schedule and results ==
The opening ceremony was held on 1 March 2016 in the Lviv Theatre of Opera and Ballet. The matches took place in the Potocki Palace, with a schedule of two games in two successive days, followed by a rest day. Possible tie-breaks in the event of a draw would have been played on 18 March. Matches were played at 15:00 local (Kyiv Time).

Colours were drawn at the opening ceremony, with Hou Yifan drawing first and receiving the black pieces. Colours were also reversed after game 4 to even out an advantage of playing White first. The time control was set at 90 minutes for the first 40 moves, with the addition of 30 minutes for the rest of the game. There was an increment of 30 seconds per move from move 1.

- Game 1: March 2
- Game 2: March 3
- Game 3: March 5
- Game 4: March 6
- Game 5: March 8
- Game 6: March 9
- Game 7: March 11
- Game 8: March 12
- Game 9: March 14
- Game 10: March 16 (not required)
- Tie-breaks: March 18 (not required)
- Closing Ceremony (rescheduled to March 15)

Women's World Chess Championship Match 2016
	Rating	1	2	3	4	5	6	7	8	9	10	Points
Mariya Muzychuk (Ukraine)	2563	½	0	½	½	½	0	½	½	0	—	3
Hou Yifan (China)	2667	½	1	½	½	½	1	½	½	1	—	6
Videostream		01	02	03	04	05	06	07	08	09		

=== Games ===
The player named first played the white pieces.

==== Game 1, Muzychuk–Hou, ½–½ ====
Muzychuk had the white pieces in the first game and opened with 1. e4. Hou played the Giuoco Piano in response, deviating from the Sicilian Defence that she usually plays. This opening choice caught Muzychuk by surprise and she was unable to obtain anything out of the opening. After many exchanges, a drawish position ensued, and the game was agreed drawn on move 31.

1. e4 e5 2. Nf3 Nc6 3. Bc4 Bc5 4. O-O Nf6 5. d3 O-O 6. c3 d6 7. h3 h6 8. Re1 a6 9. a4 Ba7 10. Nbd2 Re8 11. Nf1 Be6 12. Bxe6 Rxe6 13. Be3 Bxe3 14. Nxe3 d5 15. Qc2 Qd7 16. Rad1 Rd8 17. Nf5 Qe8 18. b4 b5 19. axb5 axb5 20. Nd2 Ne7 21. Nxe7 Qxe7 22. Nb3 dxe4 23. dxe4 Red6 24. Nc5 Rxd1+ 25. Rxd1 Rxd1 26. Qxd1 Qd6 27. Qe2 c6 28. g3 Nd7 29. Nxd7 Qxd7 30. Kg2 Qd6 31. Qe3 ½–½

==== Game 2, Hou–Muzychuk, 1–0 ====
Hou opened with 1. e4. Muzychuk avoided her typical Sicilian Defence and instead went for the Open Spanish. Unlike in game 1, however, Hou was not taken out of her preparation. A complex position developed and both players found themselves short on time. Hou was able to outplay Muzychuk after Muzychuk chose a plan that was too slow, showing excellent positional mastery.

1. e4 e5 2. Nf3 Nc6 3. Bb5 a6 4. Ba4 Nf6 5. O-O Nxe4 6. d4 b5 7. Bb3 d5 8. dxe5 Be6 9. Be3 Be7 10. c3 O-O 11. Nbd2 Qd7 12. Bc2 Nxd2 13. Qxd2 Bg4 14. Bf4 Bxf3 15. gxf3 Rad8 16. Rfd1 Qe6 17. Qe3 Rd7 18. Bg3 g6 19. a4 Nd8 20. axb5 axb5 21. f4 f6 22. exf6 Qxf6 23. Qe2 c6 24. Qg4 Rb7 25. f5 Bd6 26. Ra6 Rg7 27. fxg6 Bc5 28. Kg2 hxg6 29. Rxd5 Bxf2 30. Bb3 Ne6 31. Rd6 Bc5 32. Qxe6+ 1-0

==== Game 3, Muzychuk–Hou, ½–½ ====
After having failed to obtain an advantage with 1. e4 in game 1, Muzychuk chose 1. d4 for game 3. However, Hou was again not taken by surprise. A closed Catalan developed in which White had a small advantage thanks to her Bishop pair, but Black was never in any real danger. With the lead in the match, Hou was content to counter her opponent's efforts instead of playing for the win, while Muzychuk was unable to create any serious chances.

1. d4 Nf6 2. c4 e6 3. g3 d5 4. Bg2 Bb4+ 5. Bd2 Be7 6. Nf3 O-O 7. O-O Nbd7 8. Qc2 c6 9. Rd1 b6 10. Bf4 Ba6 11. cxd5 cxd5 12. Ne5 Rc8 13. Nc6 Bb5 14. Nxe7+ Qxe7 15. Nc3 Nh5 16. Be3 Nhf6 17. a4 Bc4 18. a5 bxa5 19. Rxa5 Qb4 20. Rda1 Rb8 21. Rxa7 Qxb2 22. Qxb2 Rxb2 23. Bf3 h6 24. h4 Rc8 25. Bf4 Rc2 26. R7a3 h5 27. Kg2 Kh7 28. Rc1 Rxc1 29. Bxc1 e5 30. dxe5 Nxe5 31. Be3 Nxf3 32. Kxf3 Ne4 33. Nxe4 dxe4+ 34. Kxe4 Bxe2 35. Ra5 f6 36. Rc5 Rxc5 1/2-1/2

==== Game 4, Hou–Muzychuk, ½–½ ====
Game 4 was the first of two consecutive games with White for Hou. As in game 2, she played the Ruy Lopez, and again Muzychuk went for the Open Spanish. Muzychuk showed superb preparation in this game. After Black's 18. ...Bc5, Hou was visibly disappointed at how deep her opponent's preparation was, but there was no way to avoid the forced draw.

1. e4 e5 2. Nf3 Nc6 3. Bb5 a6 4. Ba4 Nf6 5. O-O Nxe4 6. d4 b5 7. Bb3 d5 8. dxe5 Be6 9. c3 Be7 10. Bc2 Bg4 11. h3 Bh5 12. g4 Bg6 13. Nd4 Nxd4 14. cxd4 h5 15. f3 Ng3 16. Rf2 hxg4 17. Bxg6 Rxh3 18. Qc2 Bc5 19. Qxc5 Rh1+ 20. Kg2 Rh2+ 21. Kg1 Rh1+ 1/2-1/2

==== Game 5, Hou–Muzychuk, ½–½ ====
Hou played the English Opening for the first time in the match, but Muzychuk had no trouble equalizing. Rather than attempt to play for the win, Hou simplified the game by exchanging pieces, steering it towards a drawn ending and thereby preserving her 1-point lead.

1. c4 c6 2. Nf3 d5 3. g3 g6 4. Bg2 Bg7 5. Qa4 dxc4 6. Qxc4 e5 7. d3 Ne7 8. O-O Na6 9. Bd2 O-O 10. Qc1 Nf5 11. Na3 Nd4 12. Re1 Bg4 13. Nxd4 exd4 14. Bh6 Re8 15. Bxg7 Kxg7 16. Qd2 Qd7 17. Nc4 f6 18. h4 Re7 19. e4 dxe3 20. Nxe3 Be6 21. d4 Rae8 22. b3 Nc7 23. Qb4 Nd5 24. Nxd5 Bxd5 25. Rxe7+ Qxe7 26. Qxe7+ Rxe7 27. Bxd5 cxd5 28. Rc1 Kf7 29. Kf1 Ke6 30. Ke2 Kd6+ 31. Kd3 Rc7 32. Re1 Re7 33. Rc1 Rc7 1/2-1/2

==== Game 6, Muzychuk–Hou, 0–1 ====
Down a point and with only two more games with the white pieces remaining, Muzychuk again assayed the Giuoco Piano from game 1. This time she chose a sharper variation and soon earned a significant advantage. However, beginning from move 17, she began to play imprecisely, not only losing her advantage but also allowing Hou the better position. Hou made no mistakes and converted her advantage to a win.

1. e4 e5 2. Nf3 Nc6 3. Bc4 Bc5 4. O-O Nf6 5. d3 d6 6. c3 O-O 7. Bg5 h6 8. Bh4 g5 9. Bg3 g4 10. Nh4 Nh5 11. a4 a6 12. Na3 Qg5 13. Nc2 Ba7 14. Ne3 Ne7 15. d4 Qg7 16. dxe5 dxe5 17. Nef5 Bxf5 18. exf5 Bc5 19. Re1 Nxg3 20. hxg3 Kh8 21. Qe2 Bd6 22. Qe4 Rab8 23. Be2 h5 24. Rad1 Ng8 25. Kh2 Qg5 26. Bc4 Nf6 27. Qe3 Qxe3 28. Rxe3 e4 29. Re2 Rbd8 30. Bb3 Rd7 31. f3 Re8 32. Rde1 Rde7 33. Bc2 exf3 34. Rxe7 Rxe7 35. Rxe7 f2 36. Rxf7 f1=Q 37. Ng6+ Kg8 38. Rxf6 Bc5 0-1

==== Game 7, Hou–Muzychuk, ½–½ ====
Hou opened with 1. e4 and the game again entered the lines of the Open Spanish. Both players were very well prepared, with the novelty of the game occurring on move 19. The game resulted in a long struggle with mutual chances. Hou had some advantage early in the game, but a mistake on move 40 allowed Muzychuk to take the initiative. This led to a pawn-up ending for Muzychuk, but Hou was able to construct a fortress, reaching a Philidor position.

1. e4 e5 2. Nf3 Nc6 3. Bb5 a6 4. Ba4 Nf6 5. O-O Nxe4 6. d4 b5 7. Bb3 d5 8. dxe5 Be6 9. Nbd2 Be7 10. c3 Nc5 11. Bc2 d4 12. cxd4 Nxd4 13. Nxd4 Qxd4 14. Nf3 Qxd1 15. Rxd1 O-O 16. Be3 Rfd8 17. Rdc1 h6 18. Nd4 Bd5 19. Bd1 Nd3 20. Rxc7 Bf8 21. e6 fxe6 22. Bg4 Re8 23. b3 Bd6 24. Rc2 Ne5 25. Be2 Be4 26. Rd2 Bb4 27. Rdd1 Bd5 28. Rac1 Rac8 29. h4 Ba3 30. Rc2 Rxc2 31. Nxc2 Be7 32. h5 Rc8 33. Nd4 Kf7 34. f3 Bf6 35. Kf2 Rc3 36. f4 Nd7 37. Bd3 Ke7 38. Bb1 Bh4+ 39. Ke2 Bf6 40. g4 Bxd4 41. Bxd4 Rh3 42. Rc1 Bf3+ 43. Kf2 Bxg4 44. Bxg7 Rxh5 45. Kg3 Bf5 46. Bxf5 Rxf5 47. Bxh6 Rc5 48. Rf1 Nf6 49. Bg5 Kf7 50. Bxf6 Kxf6 51. b4 Rc4 52. Rf3 Kf5 53. Ra3 Rxf4 54. Rxa6 Rxb4 55. Rb6 Ke5 56. Kf3 Kd5 57. Ke3 e5 58. Kd2 Rb2+ 59. Kc1 Rb4 60. a3 Kc5 61. Re6 Re4 62. Kc2 Kd4 63. Rd6+ Kc4 64. Rc6+ Kd5 65. Rb6 Rc4+ 66. Kd2 Kc5 67. Rb8 Ra4 68. Rc8+ Kd4 69. Rb8 Ra5 70. Rd8+ Kc4 71. Re8 Kd5 72. Rd8+ Ke4 73. Rb8 Rxa3 74. Rxb5 Kf4 75. Rb8 Kf3 76. Rf8+ Ke4 77. Rb8 Ra2+ 78. Ke1 Kf4 79. Rb3 e4 80. Rc3 e3 81. Rc8 1/2-1/2

==== Game 8, Muzychuk–Hou, ½–½ ====
In her last game with the white pieces, Muzychuk played 1. d4, and the game developed into an uncommon variation of the Catalan Opening. This led to a blocked position in the center, but Muzychuk had a space advantage and hence chances for a serious advantage. However, 33. Kf2 lost a valuable tempo, after which her advantage disappeared. The draw left Muzychuk needing to win the remaining two games to force a tiebreak.

1. d4 Nf6 2. Nf3 e6 3. g3 d5 4. Bg2 b5 5. O-O Bb7 6. a4 b4 7. c4 a5 8. Bg5 Nbd7 9. Nbd2 Be7 10. Rc1 h6 11. Bxf6 Bxf6 12. Qc2 c6 13. e4 O-O 14. e5 Be7 15. c5 g5 16. h3 Kg7 17. Rfe1 Rh8 18. Bf1 Qg8 19. Re3 Kf8 20. Ne1 h5 21. Ng2 Ke8 22. Kh2 Nf8 23. Bd3 Ba6 24. f4 Bxd3 25. Qxd3 Qh7 26. Rf1 Qxd3 27. Rxd3 gxf4 28. Nxf4 Ng6 29. Nb3 Bg5 30. Nxg6 fxg6 31. Rdf3 Ra7 32. Kg2 Rg8 33. Kf2 Rf8 34. Kg2 Rxf3 35. Rxf3 Bd8 36. Nc1 g5 37. Nd3 Rg7 38. g4 h4 39. Nc1 Rg8 40. Nb3 Rg7 41. Kf2 Rf7 42. Rxf7 Kxf7 43. Kf3 Ke8 44. Kf2 Kf7 1/2-1/2

==== Game 9, Hou–Muzychuk, 1–0 ====
Needing to win at all costs, Muzychuk played the Sicilian Defence for the first time. However, in the complex middlegame which ensued she was comprehensively outplayed by Hou, who steadily grew an advantage into a winning position. With this win, Hou took the match and the title.

1. e4 c5 2. Nf3 Nc6 3. d4 cxd4 4. Nxd4 Nf6 5. Nc3 d6 6. Be2 e5 7. Nb3 Be7 8. O-O O-O 9. Be3 Be6 10. f3 Na5 11. Nxa5 Qxa5 12. Qd2 Rfc8 13. Rfd1 Kf8 14. a4 a6 15. Nd5 Qxd2 16. Rxd2 Nxd5 17. exd5 Bd7 18. a5 Bb5 19. Kf1 f5 20. c3 g5 21. Rc2 h5 22. c4 g4 23. b4 f4 24. Bf2 Bd7 25. c5 Bf5 26. Rc4 Kf7 27. Rd1 Rg8 28. g3 fxg3 29. hxg3 Rac8 30. fxg4 hxg4 31. Kg2 Bd7 32. Rh1 Rg7 33. cxd6 Bxd6 34. Rxc8 Bxc8 35. Bc5 Bxc5 36. bxc5 Bf5 37. Kf2 Rg8 38. Ke3 Rd8 39. Rf1 Kg6 40. Rd1 Kg5 41. d6 Rh8 42. d7 Rd8 43. c6 bxc6 44. Bxa6 c5 45. Bb7 c4 46. a6 1-0
