= Yuanling Yuan =

Canadian chess player and entrepreneur (born 1994)

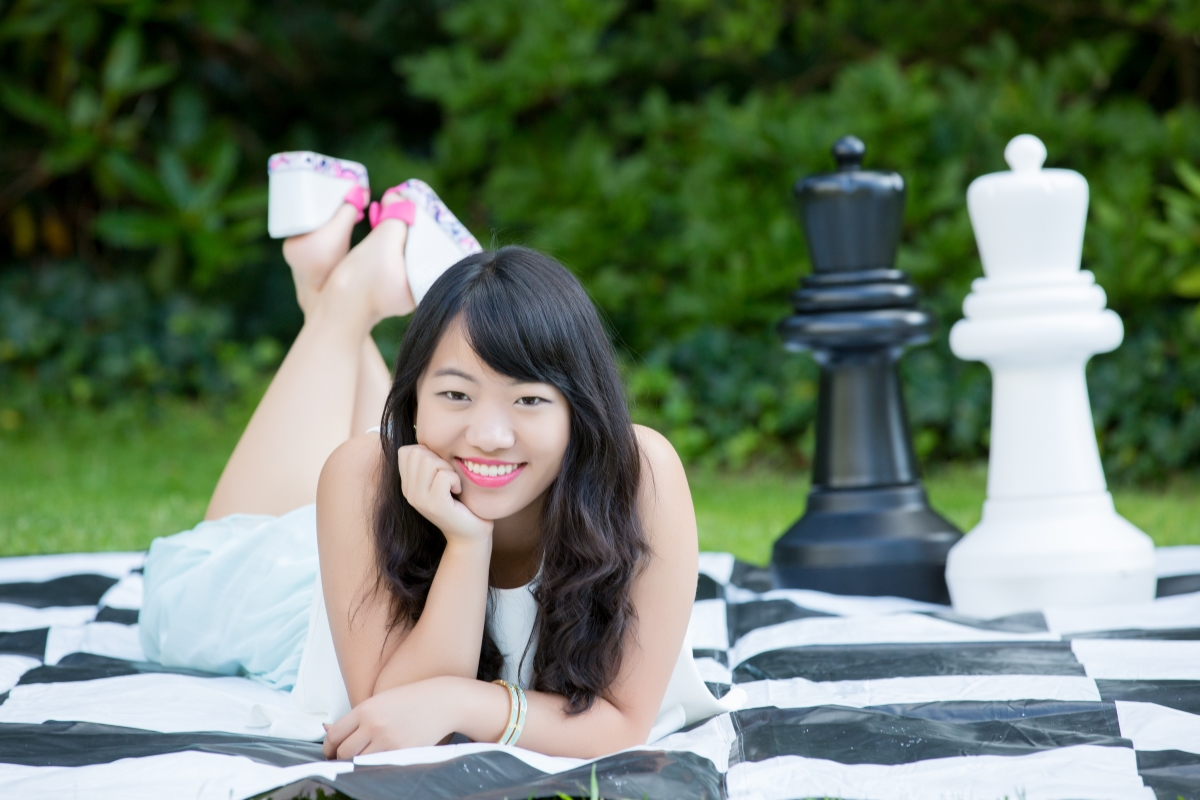

Personal information
- Born: June 3, 1994 (age 32) Shanghai, China

Chess career
- Country: Canada
- Title: Woman International Master (2009)
- FIDE rating: 2225 (October 2025)
- Peak rating: 2270 (May 2015)

Yuanling Yuan
- Chinese: 袁元凌
Transcriptions
Standard Mandarin
- Hanyu Pinyin: Yuán Yuánlíng

Yuanling Yuan (born 3 June 1994) is a Canadian chess player and entrepreneur. She was awarded the title of Woman International Master (WIM) by FIDE in 2009. Yuan competed in the Women's World Chess Championship in 2015 and represented Canada five times at the Women's Chess Olympiad (2008, 2010, 2012, 2014 and 2016).

== Biography ==
Born in Shanghai, Yuanling Yuan moved to Canada with her family when she was five years old. While in Ottawa she was playing for the RA Chess Club, but when she moved to Toronto she joined the Scarborough Chess Club.

She attended Victoria Park Collegiate Institute from 2008 to 2012, completing the International Baccalaureate program in high school. In July 2015, Yuan shared her experience of founding a non-profit organisation "Chess in the Library" at the IB Conference of the Americas in Chicago. In 2016, Yuanling graduated from Yale University with a B.A. in economics.

In 2003 Yuan became Canadian Master after winning the Canadian girls' under-10 title. In 2007, as a seventh grader, she became the high school champion of both Toronto and Ontario, as well as the junior champion of Toronto. She ended 2008 as the top rated Canadian female competitor after placing second behind Cuban Zirka Frometa Castillo at the Pan-American Women's Championship in San Salvador. She was the highest rated Canadian female player between 2008 and 2015.

As member of the Canadian national women's team she played the 38th Chess Olympiad, 2008, in Dresden on second board (6½ points out of 10 games), the 39th Chess Olympiad, 2010, in Khanty-Mansiysk on first board (7½ points out of 11 games) and the 41st Chess Olympiad, 2014 in Tromsø on first board (7½ points out of 11 games).

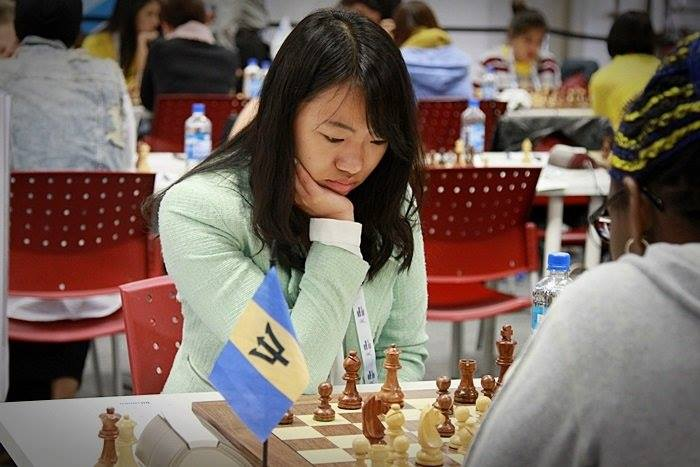
Yuan at the 2014 Chess Olympiad

In October 2009 Yuan was awarded the title of Woman International Master (WIM) by FIDE, and was the youngest Canadian in history to gain this title, until Qiyu Zhou became WIM at the same age in 2015. She achieved the required norms at the Pan-American Women's Championship in May 2008 as well as six weeks later at a tournament in Chicago.

In March 2015, Yuan competed in the Women's World Championship. In the first round, she won against Mariya Muzychuk, the 8th seed player and eventual winner, in the first game. Yuan lost the second and went on losing the tiebreakers, therefore exiting the tournament.

== Chess in the Library ==
In 2009, she founded the program Chess in the Library. This volunteer organization draws interest to chess in public libraries, including the opportunity to play and organize chess in libraries. The organization has more than 28 member libraries in Ontario, Alberta, British Columbia and Washington, D.C.

== Entrepreneurship ==
In 2014, Yuan founded the start-up SubLite LLC, a platform that assists with college students finding housing and internships. The start-up was backed by both the Yale Entrepreneurship Institute and the Wharton Innovation Fund.

In 2026, Yuan co-founded Epoch, an AI-native litigation firm, with David LeRay.
