= Olga Girya =

Russian chess grandmaster (born 1991)

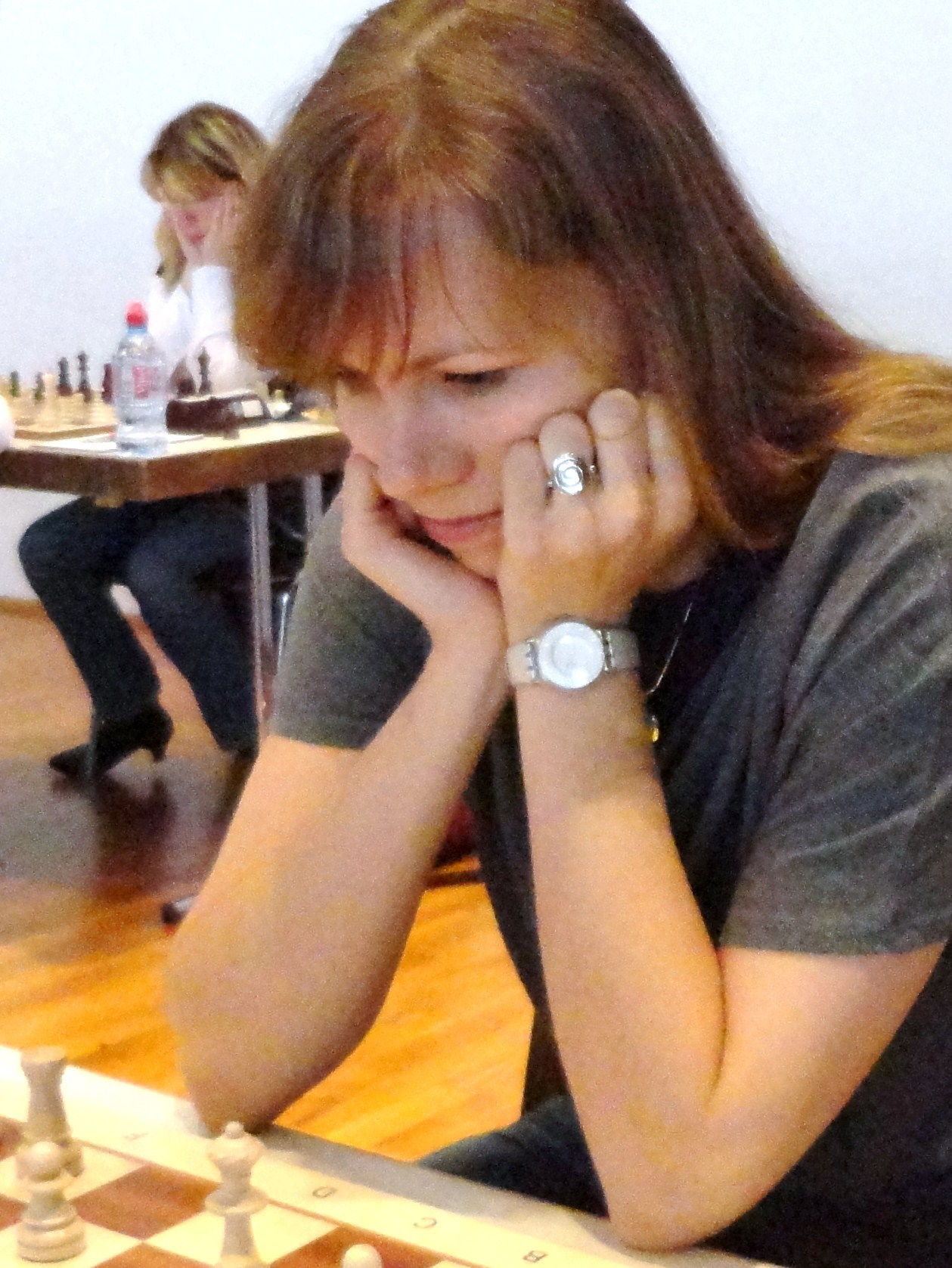
- Girya in 2012

Personal information
- Born: Olga Alexandrovna Girya; 4 June 1991 (age 35) Langepas, Russian SFSR, Soviet Union
- Spouse: Igor Lysyj

Chess career
- Country: Russia
- Title: Grandmaster (2021)
- Peak rating: 2505 (September 2017)

Olga Alexandrovna Girya (Russian: Ольга Александровна Гиря; born 4 June 1991) is a Russian chess player. She holds the title of Grandmaster (GM), which FIDE awarded her in 2021. She was a member of the gold medal-winning Russian team in the 2014 Women's Chess Olympiad and in the 2017 Women's World Team Chess Championship. Girya competed in the Women's World Chess Championship in 2012, 2015, 2017 and 2018. She won the Russian Women's Chess Championship in 2019.

== Career ==
Born in Langepas, Girya won, at junior level, the gold medal in the girls U18 division of both World Youth Chess Championships and European Youth Chess Championships in 2009, silver in the girls U16 at the World Youth Championships in 2007 and in the girls U18 at European Youth Championships in 2008, and bronze in the girls U18 at World Youth Championship in 2008. She won the Russian girls U20 championship in 2010, and finished runner-up at the World Girls U20 Championship in 2010 and 2011.

Girya took part in the FIDE Women's Grand Prix series 2013–14 as host city nominee of Khanty-Mansiysk. In the fourth stage, held in Khanty-Mansiysk, she placed second, behind Hou Yifan, and achieved a norm for the title Grandmaster.

In February 2014, she won the women's open event ("Russian Women's Premier Cup") of the Moscow Open. In April 2014, Girya won the bronze medal at the Women's World Rapid Chess Championship. In June, she won the women's section of the Russian Higher League, the qualifier for the Superfinal of the women's Russian Chess Championship. In the latter event Girya placed fourth. In November of the same year, she won the Women's Russian Cup, a knockout competition, by defeating Anastasia Bodnaruk in the final. In 2016, Girya took part in the last three events of the FIDE Women's Grand Prix series as one of the organisers' nominee. She finished tied for first place with Natalija Pogonina in the 2018 Russian Women's Championship Superfinal and took the silver medal after losing the playoff. The next year Girya and Pogonina finished again tied for first. This time Girya won the playoff to become Russian women's champion.

== Team competitions ==
Girya made her debut in the national women's team at the 39th Chess Olympiad playing on the second board for team Russia 2.

She played on the Russian women's team in the Russia vs China match, held with the Scheveningen system, in 2012 and 2015.

In 2013, she helped the Russian team to win the bronze medal in the Women's World Team Chess Championship, winning also the individual gold for board 5, and silver in the Women's European Team Chess Championship.

In April 2015, at the Women's World Team Championship, she won the team bronze and the individual gold on board 5.
