= 39th Chess Olympiad =

2010 chess tournament in Khanty-Mansiysk, Russia

- The official logo of the Olympiad
- Host city: Khanty-Mansiysk
- Country: Russia
- Nations: 141 (Open); 110 (Women)
- Teams: 148 (Open); 115 (Women)
- Athletes: 1,306
- Dates: 19 September – 4 October 2010

Medalists

Team (Open)
- 1st place, gold medalist(s): Ukraine
- 2nd place, silver medalist(s): Russia
- 3rd place, bronze medalist(s): Israel

Team (Women)
- 1st place, gold medalist(s): Russia
- 2nd place, silver medalist(s): China
- 3rd place, bronze medalist(s): Georgia

Individual (Open)
- (Israel) Emil Sutovsky

Individual (Women)
- (Ukraine) Inna Gaponenko

The 39th Chess Olympiad (Russian: 39-я Шахматная олимпиада, 39-ya Shakhmatnaya olimpiada), organised by FIDE and comprising an open and a women's tournament, as well as several other events designed to promote the game of chess, took place from September 19 to October 4, 2010, in Khanty-Mansiysk, Russia. There were 148 teams in the open event and 115 in the women's event. In total, 1306 players were registered.

This was the fourth time Russia organized the Chess Olympiad after 1956 (Soviet Union), 1994, and 1998. Six cities had submitted bids to organize the Olympiad: Khanty-Mansiysk, Budva, Buenos Aires, Poznań, Riga, and Tallinn. The selection was part of the FIDE Congress held during the 37th Chess Olympiad in Turin in 2006.

The main events in both competitions were held in indoor tennis courts, which opened in September 2008. With an area of 15,558 m^{2}, it hosted 3,500 chess fans.

Both tournament sections were officiated by international arbiter Sava Stoisavljević (Serbia). For the second time, the number of rounds of the Swiss system was 11 with accelerated pairings. Both divisions were played over four boards per round, with each team allowed one alternate for a total of five players. The final rankings were determined by match points. In the event of a draw, the tie-break was decided by 1. Deducted Sonneborn-Berger; 2. Game points; 3. Deducted sum of match points.

The time control for each game permitted each player 90 minutes their first 40 moves and 30 minutes for the rest of the game, with an additional 30 seconds increment for each player after each move, beginning with the first. The rule introduced at the previous Olympiad, according to which no draws by agreement were permitted before 30 moves, was once again abolished.

== Open event ==
The open division was contested by 148 teams representing 141 nations. Russia, as hosts, fielded no less than five teams, whilst the International Braille Chess Association (IBCA), the International Physically Disabled Chess Association (IPCA), and the International Committee of Silent Chess (ICSC) each provided one squad. Senegal were signed up, but did not turn up for their first round match and were disqualified.

Ukraine, led by Vasyl Ivanchuk and former FIDE Champion Ruslan Ponomariov, took their second title after 2004. Once again, the Russian hosts were the pre-tournament favourites but, for the fourth Olympiad in a row, failed to live up to expectations, although they came close this time. Captained by former World Champion Vladimir Kramnik, the Russians trailed the Ukrainians by one point before the last round. When Ukraine and eventual bronze medallists Israel, led by Boris Gelfand, drew their final match, Russia had the opportunity to snatch the gold. They only drew as well, however, so in the end had to settle for silver.

Although the Russian "A" team disappointed its fans on its home turf, the "B" squad, with five Olympic debutants, exceeded expectations by finishing sixth. Captain Ian Nepomniachtchi won an individual bronze medal on the top board.

Defending champions Armenia had to settle for seventh place and Team United States for ninth. India was once again without reigning World Champion Viswanathan Anand and finished 18th, while his opponent in the recent championship match, Veselin Topalov, led Bulgaria to 31st place. Another former great power of chess, England, also disappointed in 24th place. The number one player in the world, Magnus Carlsen, only scored 4½ points in 8 games, and his Norwegian team ended up in 51st place.

Due to financial disagreements with the national federation, the top German players did not show up. Seriously weakened, Team Germany came recorded an all-time low in 64th place, just below the team of physically impaired players. Incidentally, the IPCA team were led by Thomas Luther, a former four-time Olympian for the German team.

Open event
#	Country	Players	Average rating	MP	dSB
1	Ukraine	Ivanchuk, Ponomariov, Eljanov, Efimenko, Moiseenko	2737	19	
2	Russia	Kramnik, Grischuk, Svidler, Karjakin, Malakhov	2755	18	
3	Israel	Gelfand, Sutovsky, Smirin, Rodshtein, Mikhalevski	2676	17	367.5
4	Hungary	Leko, Almási, Polgár, Berkes, Balogh	2698	17	355.5
5	China	Wang Yue, Wang Hao, Bu Xiangzhi, Zhou Jianchao, Li Chao	2703	16	362.0
6	Russia "B"	Nepomniachtchi, Alekseev, Vitiugov, Tomashevsky, Timofeev	2702	16	355.0
7	Armenia	Aronian, Akopian, Sargissian, Pashikian, Grigoryan	2698	16	345.0
8	Spain	Shirov, Vallejo Pons, Salgado Lopez, Magem Badals, Alsina Leal	2658	16	332.0
9	United States	Nakamura, Kamsky, Onischuk, Shulman, Hess	2691	16	315.5
10	France	Vachier-Lagrave, Fressinet, Tkachiev, Édouard, Feller	2681	16	311.5

Final Ranking - Open
Rank	Country	Average rating	MP	dSB	GP
11	Poland	2662	15	346.5	
12	Azerbaijan	2694	15	333.0	
13	Russia "C"	2665	15	320.5	
14	Belarus	2659	15	307.5	
15	Netherlands	2665	15	305.0	
16	Slovakia	2596	15	302.5	
17	Brazil	2590	15	290.5	
18	India	2645	15	287.0	
19	Denmark	2519	15	257.5	
20	Czech Republic	2656	14	338.5	
21	Italy	2583	14	316.5	
22	Greece	2590	14	302.5	
23	Cuba	2652	14	299.0	
24	England	2673	14	292.0	
25	Argentina	2587	14	281.0	
26	Estonia	2511	14	277.0	
27	Kazakhstan	2535	14	274.0	
28	Moldova	2580	14	265.0	
29	Iran	2550	14	259.5	
30	Georgia	2637	13	316.0	
31	Bulgaria	2693	13	287.5	
32	Croatia	2585	13	284.5	
33	Serbia	2609	13	278.0	
34	Sweden	2572	13	277.0	
35	Lithuania	2545	13	268.0	
36	Slovenia	2485	13	264.5	
37	Canada	2492	13	264.0	
38	Austria	2516	13	263.0	
39	Russia "D"	2492	13	258.0	
40	Iceland	2489	13	257.5	
41	Egypt	2537	13	252.0	
42	Montenegro	2481	13	251.5	
43	Qatar	2483	13	236.0	
44	Peru	2516	13	231.0	
45	Turkey	2501	13	230.0	
46	Uruguay	2384	13	227.0	
47	Zambia	2002	13	202.5	
48	ICSC	2394	13	197.0	
49	Uzbekistan	2572	12	285.0	
50	Philippines	2552	12	276.0	
51	Norway	2594	12	274.5	
52	Vietnam	2587	12	272.0	
53	Chile	2500	12	261.0	
54	Colombia	2475	12	255.0	
55	Australia	2502	12	253.0	
56	North Macedonia	2524	12	246.5	
57	Albania	2419	12	231.5	
58	Singapore	2393	12	231.0	
59	Finland	2456	12	218.0	
60	Belgium	2394	12	215.0	
61	United Arab Emirates	2286	12	211.5	
62	Pakistan	1970	12	194.5	
63	IPCA	2403	12	192.5	
64	Germany	2534	11	268.0	
65	Switzerland	2513	11	258.5	
66	Bosnia and Herzegovina	2574	11	254.5	
67	Indonesia	2423	11	248.5	
68	Kyrgyzstan	2350	11	231.5	
69	Latvia	2472	11	224.0	
70	Russia "E"	2449	11	220.0	
71	Mongolia	2422	11	216.5	
72	Mexico	2557	11	214.0	
73	Bangladesh	2335	11	200.0	
74	South Africa	2338	11	194.5	
75	Portugal	2459	11	194.0	
76	Turkmenistan	2418	11	193.0	
77	Jordan	2343	11	188.0	
78	Libya	2195	11	187.5	
79	Paraguay	2330	11	186.0	
80	Faroe Islands	2332	11	185.5	
81	Venezuela	2429	11	184.5	
82	Costa Rica	2342	11	179.0	
83	Scotland	2429	11	175.5	
84	Yemen	2327	11	165.0	
85	Ecuador	2424	10	219.0	
86	Tajikistan	2436	10	218.0	
87	Andorra	2285	10	206.5	
88	Ireland	2365	10	202.0	
89	Algeria	2273	10	195.5	
90	Dominican Republic	2314	10	191.5	
91	New Zealand	2272	10	176.0	
92	Malaysia	2325	10	172.0	
93	Thailand	2256	10	168.5	21
94	Panama	2165	10	168.5	20½
95	Barbados	2251	10	168.0	
96	Japan	2221	10	166.5	
97	Luxembourg	2279	10	162.5	20½
98	Cyprus	2152	10	162.5	19
99	Guatemala	2214	10	160.5	
100	Malta	2180	10	157.0	
101	Nigeria	1464	10	153.0	
102	IBCA	2346	10	145.5	
103	Iraq	2363	9	183.0	
104	Sri Lanka	2088	9	169.0	
105	Jamaica	2243	9	160.0	
106	Uganda	1938	9	158.5	
107	Nepal	2096	9	152.5	
108	Puerto Rico	2224	9	151.0	
109	Lebanon	2227	9	149.0	
110	Monaco	2252	9	143.0	
111	Honduras	1950	9	141.5	
112	Palestine	1894	9	133.0	
113	South Korea	2069	9	132.0	
114	Bolivia	2206	9	116.5	
115	Trinidad and Tobago	2164	9	107.0	
116	Botswana	2217	8	141.0	
117	Brunei	2115	8	139.0	
118	Mauritius	2128	8	138.0	
119	Chinese Taipei	1849	8	137.5	
120	Kenya	1669	8	135.0	
121	Aruba	2007	8	130.5	
122	Wales	2260	8	127.5	
123	Jersey	2111	8	127.0	
124	Angola	2230	8	125.0	
125	Mali	1200	8	121.5	
126	Namibia	1891	8	112.0	
127	Malawi	1435	8	104.0	
128	Ethiopia	1691	8	100.0	
129	Hong Kong	1967	8	83.0	
130	Guernsey	1927	8	69.5	
131	Mauritania	1200	7	112.5	
132	Suriname	2120	7	110.0	
133	Macau	1992	7	108.5	
134	Mozambique	1853	7	103.0	
135	Madagascar	1438	7	102.0	
136	Netherlands Antilles	2049	7	80.5	
137	Cameroon	1200	7	78.5	
138	São Tomé and Príncipe	1496	7	70.5	
139	Haiti	1619	6	98.0	
140	Ghana	1530	6	81.0	15½
141	Bermuda	1940	6	81.0	14½
142	Sierra Leone	1200	6	74.0	
143	Papua New Guinea	2058	6	70.0	
144	San Marino	2038	6	50.5	
145	Burundi	1200	4	45.5	
146	Rwanda	1321	3	57.0	
147	United States Virgin Islands	1200	3	32.5	
148	Seychelles	1604	2		

=== Group prizes ===
In addition to the overall medals, prizes were given out to the best teams in five different seeding groups—in other words, the teams who exceeded their seeding the most. Overall medal winners were not eligible for group prizes.

Group Prizes
Group	Seeding range	Team	MP	dSB
A	1–29	Hungary	17	355.5
B	30–59	Belarus	15	307.5
C	60–89	Uruguay	13	227.0
D	90–119	Libya	11	187.5
E	120–148	Zambia	13	202.5

=== Individual medals ===
All board prizes were given out according to performance ratings. Sutovsky on the second board had the best performance of all players at the tournament:

- Board 1: (Ukraine) Vasyl Ivanchuk 2890
- Board 2: (Israel) Emil Sutovsky 2895
- Board 3: (Belarus) Vitaly Teterev 2853
- Board 4: (Russia) Sergey Karjakin 2859
- Reserve: (Poland) Mateusz Bartel 2706

== Women's event ==
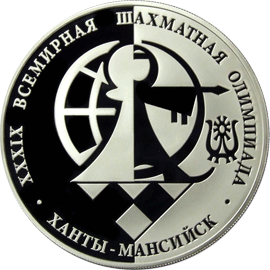
Commemorative coin

The women's division was contested by 115 teams representing 110 nations. Russia, as hosts, fielded three teams, whilst the International Braille Chess Association (IBCA), the International Physically Disabled Chess Association (IPCA), and the International Committee of Silent Chess (ICSC) each provided one squad.

The Russians won by an impressive four points to take their first independent title in the post-Soviet era. The team was led by the two Kosintseva sisters, who both won their respective boards, while reigning World Champion Alexandra Kosteniuk "only" played third board and finished sixth.

China was captained by soon-to-be World Champion, 16-year-old Hou Yifan. They clinched the silver medals, another two points ahead of a field of six teams, of which defending champions Georgia had the best tie-break score and took the bronze.

The number one female player in the world, Judit Polgár, was absent from the women's competition. Instead she represented Hungary on third board in the open event, where she finished fourth both individually and with the team.

Women's event
#	Country	Players	Average rating	MP	dSB
1	Russia	T. Kosintseva, N. Kosintseva, Kosteniuk, Galliamova, Gunina	2536	22	
2	China	Hou Yifan, Ju Wenjun, Zhao Xue, Huang Qian, Wang Yu	2500	18	
3	Georgia	Dzagnidze, Javakhishvili, Melia, Khukhashvili, Khotenashvili	2472	16	384.0
4	Cuba	Ordaz Valdés, Linares Nápoles, Marrero Lopez, Pina Vega, Arribas Robaina	2333	16	348.5
5	United States	Krush, Zatonskih, Abrahamyan, Baginskaite, Foisor	2413	16	336.5
6	Poland	Soćko, Zawadzka, Majdan-Gajewska, Dworakowska, Kądziołka	2386	16	336.0
7	Azerbaijan	Z. Mamedyarova, T. Mamedyarova, Mammadova, Umudova, Isgandarova	2270	16	320.0
8	Bulgaria	Stefanova, Voiska, Nikolova, Videnova, Velcheva	2361	16	296.5
9	Ukraine	Lahno, Zhukova, Ushenina, Gaponenko, Muzychuk	2493	15	366.5
10	Russia "B"	Pogonina, Girya, Savina, Bodnaruk, Kashlinskaya	2427	15	335.5

Final Ranking - Women
Rank	Country	Average rating	MP	dSB	GP	dSMP
11	Armenia	2401	15	327.5		
12	Greece	2306	15	316.0		
13	Romania	2352	15	312.5		
14	Russia "C"	2209	15	287.0		
15	Hungary	2398	14	320.5		
16	France	2375	14	314.0		
17	India	2400	14	313.5		
18	Vietnam	2282	14	278.0		
19	Iran	2252	14	276.0		
20	Lithuania	2191	14	261.5		
21	England	2195	14	257.5	27½	
22	Croatia	2262	14	257.5	23½	
23	Peru	2210	14	246.5		
24	Slovakia	2349	13	317.5		
25	Germany	2344	13	313.5		
26	Serbia	2337	13	304.0		
27	Israel	2290	13	290.0		
28	Netherlands	2330	13	279.5	28½	
29	Kazakhstan	2196	13	279.5	27½	
30	Uzbekistan	2222	13	277.5		
31	Latvia	2293	13	263.5		
32	Slovenia	2358	13	257.5		
33	Bosnia and Herzegovina	2168	13	255.0		
34	Belarus	2218	13	252.5		
35	Argentina	2259	13	249.5		
36	Italy	2240	13	238.5		
37	Colombia	2191	12	266.5		
38	Turkey	2145	12	264.0		
39	Spain	2272	12	258.0		
40	Moldova	2168	12	251.0		
41	Sweden	2100	12	244.5		
42	Ecuador	2195	12	239.0		
43	Indonesia	2144	12	236.0		
44	Philippines	2107	12	234.5		
45	Denmark	2057	12	200.5		
46	Australia	2105	12	198.5		
47	Venezuela	2105	12	191.0		
48	Bangladesh	2035	12	178.0		
49	Turkmenistan	2167	11	251.5		
50	Czech Republic	2313	11	248.0		
51	Mongolia	2229	11	247.0		
52	Switzerland	2163	11	220.5		
53	Norway	2166	11	204.0		
54	Estonia	2144	11	203.5		
55	Austria	2228	11	203.0		
56	Guatemala	1892	11	202.5		
57	Iceland	1968	11	201.0		
58	Montenegro	2157	11	196.5		
59	ICSC	2113	11	193.0		
60	North Macedonia	1993	11	192.5		
61	Algeria	1713	11	184.5		
62	Singapore	1991	11	179.0		
63	Chile	1921	11	160.0		
64	Malaysia	1941	11	159.5		
65	Scotland	1970	11	155.0		
66	Portugal	2050	10	227.0		
67	Canada	2054	10	217.0		
68	IPCA	1975	10	178.0		
69	South Africa	1952	10	175.0		
70	Brazil	2016	10	172.5		
71	Mexico	2071	10	166.0		
72	Paraguay	1753	10	162.5		
73	Albania	1970	10	159.5		
74	Bolivia	2013	10	155.0		
75	Sri Lanka	1820	10	147.5		
76	Puerto Rico	1880	10	141.5		
77	Jordan	1882	10	136.5		
78	Syria	1742	10	122.0		
79	Tajikistan	1779	9	169.0	20½	107
80	IBCA	1803	9	169.0	20½	102
81	Dominican Republic	1982	9	168.0		
82	New Zealand	1952	9	162.0		
83	Jamaica	1401	9	160.5		
84	Kyrgyzstan	1855	9	160.0		
85	Egypt	1947	9	158.0		
86	Botswana	1889	9	145.5		
87	Qatar	1568	9	118.0	17	
88	Nigeria	1375	9	118.0	16½	
89	Chinese Taipei	1391	9	117.5		
90	Barbados	1958	9	115.5		
91	Wales	1862	8	158.0		
92	United Arab Emirates	1714	8	135.0		
93	Tunisia	1529	8	128.5		
94	South Korea	1555	8	122.0		
95	Zambia	1200	8	119.0		
96	Suriname	1636	8	111.0		
97	Yemen	1732	8	109.0		
98	Angola	1694	8	90.5		
99	Netherlands Antilles	1361	8	79.0		
100	Iraq	1893	7	139.0		
101	Uganda	1200	7	125.0		
102	Thailand	1376	7	110.0		
103	Ireland	1252	7	100.5		
104	Japan	1425	7	86.5		
105	Aruba	1200	7	84.5		
106	Panama	1377	7	80.5		
107	Ethiopia	1200	7	45.0		
108	Malawi	1200	6	79.5		
109	Pakistan	1349	6	79.0		
110	Kenya	1200	6	70.5		
111	Honduras	1200	6	70.0		
112	Mozambique	1331	6	66.0		
113	Trinidad and Tobago	1506	6	64.0		
114	Libya	1441	6	61.5		
115	Seychelles	1200	1			

=== Individual medals ===
All board prizes were given out according to performance ratings. Gaponenko on the fourth board had the best performance of all players at the tournament:

- Board 1: (Russia) Tatiana Kosintseva 2628
- Board 2: (Russia) Nadezhda Kosintseva 2662
- Board 3: (Cuba) Yaniet Marrero Lopez 2511
- Board 4: (Ukraine) Inna Gaponenko 2691
- Reserve: (Ukraine) Mariya Muzychuk 2431

== Overall title ==
The Nona Gaprindashvili Trophy is awarded to the nation that has the highest toal number of match points in the open and women's divisions combined. Where two or more teams are tied, they are ordered by the same tie breakers as in the two separate events.

The trophy, named after the former women's World Champion (1961–78), was created by FIDE in 1997.

#	Team	MP	dSB
1	Russia	40	
2	China	34	748.5
3	Ukraine	34	747.0

== FIDE presidential election ==
During the Olympiad, Kirsan Ilyumzhinov was re-elected as President of FIDE, defeating his rival, former World Champion Anatoly Karpov, decisively by 95 votes to 55.

== Controversies ==
In the first round, the team from Yemen refused to play against Israel. Each of the four Israeli players was thus awarded a technical victory.

Three French players were caught in a scheme to use a computer program to decide moves. Their plan involved one player, Cyril Marzolo (IM), following the tournament at home and using the computer program to decide the best moves. He would send the moves by text message to the captain of the French team, Arnaud Hauchard (GM), who would then stand or sit at various tables as a signal to the player Sébastien Feller (GM) to make a certain move. Feller and Marzolo were given five year suspensions for this, while Hauchard was given a lifetime suspension. None of the other players on the French team knew of this or were involved.
