= Daniel Alsina Leal =

Spanish chess grandmaster (born 1988)

Daniel Alsina
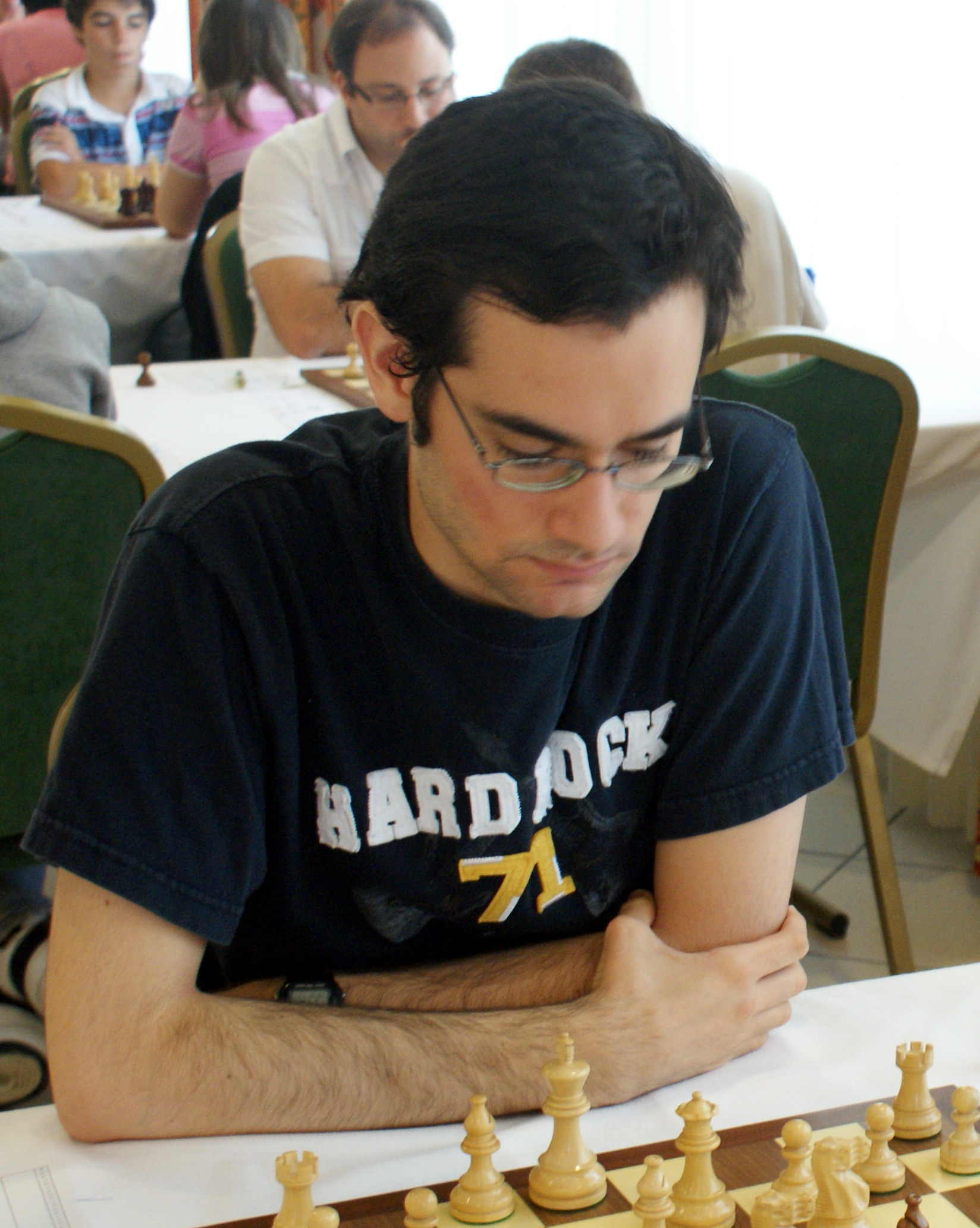
- Alsina in 2010

Personal information
- Born: 10 May 1988 (age 38) Barcelona, Spain

Chess career
- Country: Spain
- Title: Grandmaster (2010)
- FIDE rating: 2488 (July 2026)
- Peak rating: 2553 (January 2014)

Daniel Alsina Leal (born 10 May 1988) is a Spanish chess Grandmaster (since 2010).

== Biography ==
In 2000–2005 Daniel Alsina Leal represented Spain several times at the World and European Youth Chess Championships in various age group. He was also a multiple medalist of the Catalan Youth Chess Championship and won the Spanish Junior Chess Championship under 18 years in 2006.

In 2005, Daniel Alsina Leal won the International Chess Tournament in Vila de Sant Boi. In 2007, he shared the second place in the International Chess Tournament de Sants, Hostafrancs and La Bordeta in Barcelona. In 2009 in Barcelona, Daniel Alsina Leal achieved the best individual result in his chess career, winning this tournament alone, being the only player without the title of grandmaster, ahead of in the final classification among others Alexey Dreev, Pavel Tregubov and Ulf Andersson.

Daniel Alsina Leal played for Spain in the Chess Olympiad:

- In 2010, at reserve board in the 39th Chess Olympiad in Khanty-Mansiysk (+4, =2, -1).

In 2008, he was awarded the FIDE International Master (IM) title and received the FIDE Grandmaster (GM) title two years later.
