= Yaniet Marrero López =

Cuban-American chess player (born 1983)

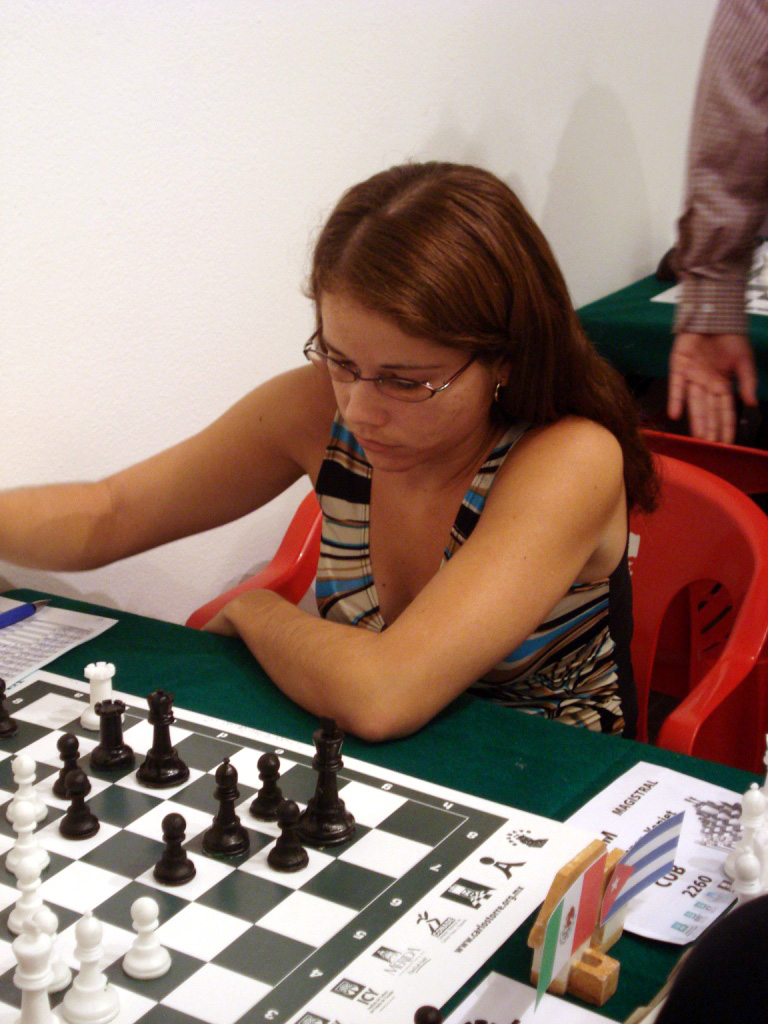

Personal information
- Born: April 4, 1983 (age 43)

Chess career
- Country: Cuba (until 2023); United States (since 2023)
- Title: Woman Grandmaster (2008)
- FIDE rating: 2139 (August 2019)
- Peak rating: 2349 (November 2010)

Yaniet Marrero López (born 4 April 1983) is a Cuban chess player who holds the FIDE title of Woman Grandmaster (WGM). She won the Women's Cuban Chess Championship in 2011.

At the 2010 Women's Chess Olympiad she won an individual gold medal thanks to her rating performance of 2511 playing on board three for the Cuban team, which finished fourth.

Marrero Lopez competed in the Women's World Chess Championship 2015: she knocked out in the first round Grandmaster Elina Danielian to reach round two, where she was eliminated by International Master Meri Arabidze.
