= Meri Arabidze =

Georgian chess player (born 1994)

- Arabidze in 2026

Personal information
- Born: 25 February 1994 (age 32) Samtredia, Georgia

Chess career
- Country: Georgia
- Title: International Master (2014); Woman Grandmaster (2012)
- Peak rating: 2466 (January 2024)

Meri Arabidze (Georgian: მერი არაბიძე; born 25 February 1994 in Samtredia, Georgia) is a Georgian chess player who holds the FIDE titles of International Master and Woman Grandmaster.

== Career ==
She won three titles at the World Youth Chess Championship: girls under-10 in 2004, girls under-12 in 2005, and girls under-18 in 2011. Arabidze also won three times at the European Youth Chess Championship, in the categories girls under-10 in 2004, girls under-12 in 2006, and girls under-14 in 2008.

Arabidze earned the Woman FIDE Master (WFM) title in 2004, Woman International Master (WIM) in 2009, Woman Grandmaster (WGM) in 2012, and International Master (IM) in 2014.

In March 2023 she became European Women's chess champion, with 8.5 out of 11 games.

In 2014, at the Moscow Open, she won the tournament G, a round-robin event for female students.

Arabidze reached the quarterfinals of the Women's World Chess Championship 2015, after sequentially knocking out Elisabeth Pähtz, Yaniet Marrero Lopez and Viktorija Cmilyte. Then she lost to Harika Dronavalli.

She was part of the Georgian team which won the Women's World Team Chess Championship 2015. In this competition she also won the individual gold medal for board 3. She played for the Georgian national team also in the Women's European Team Chess Championship in 2013 and 2015, winning a team bronze medal in 2015.
