= Potocki Palace, Lviv =

Building in Lviv, Ukraine

Potocki Palace
- палац Потоцьких
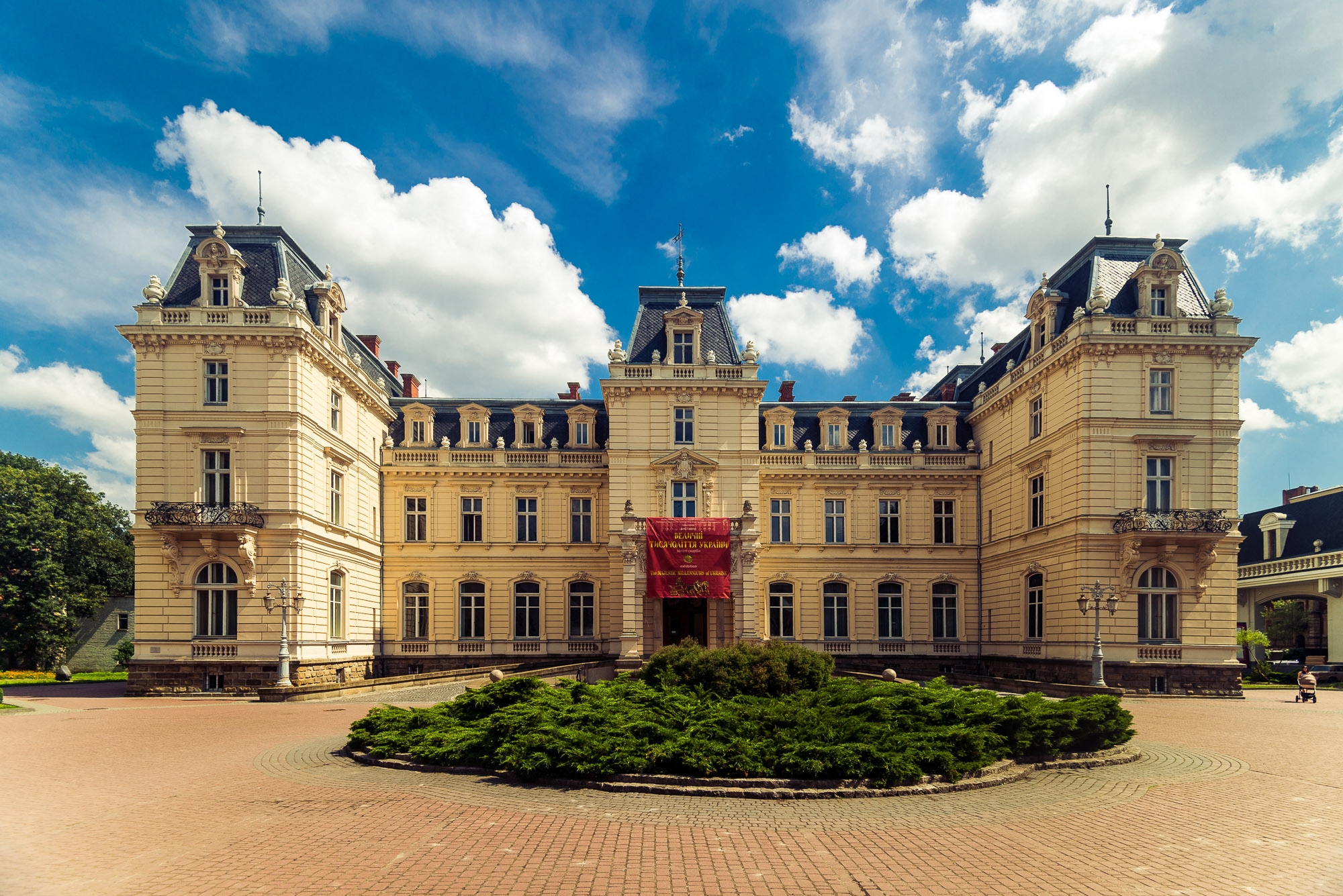
- Interactive map of the Potocki Palace area

General information
- Location: Copernicus Street, 15, Lviv, Ukraine
- Opened: 1880

Website
- lvivgallery.org.ua/museums/palac-potockyh

The Potocki Palace in Lviv (Polish pronunciation: [pɔˈtɔt͡skʲi], Ukrainian: Палац Потоцьких, Palats Pototskykh; Polish: Pałac Potockich) was built in the 1880s as an urban seat of Alfred Józef Potocki, former Minister-President of Austria. No cost was spared to make it the grandest nobleman's residence in the city. It is located on the Copernicus Street 15.

At the start of the 20th century, the parkland gave way to a network of apartment buildings. It was confiscated by the Ukrainian Soviet Socialist Republic in 1940. The palace itself was adapted for holding wedding ceremonies in 1972 and subsequently underwent restoration.

In the 2000s, the President of Ukraine appropriated the palace as one of his residences. Some of its architectural motifs were borrowed by the next-door exhibition hall (inaugurated in 1996).

The matches of the Women's World Chess Championship 2016 were played in the palace.

Today, it hosts a branch of the Lviv National Art Gallery.

== History of the Palace ==
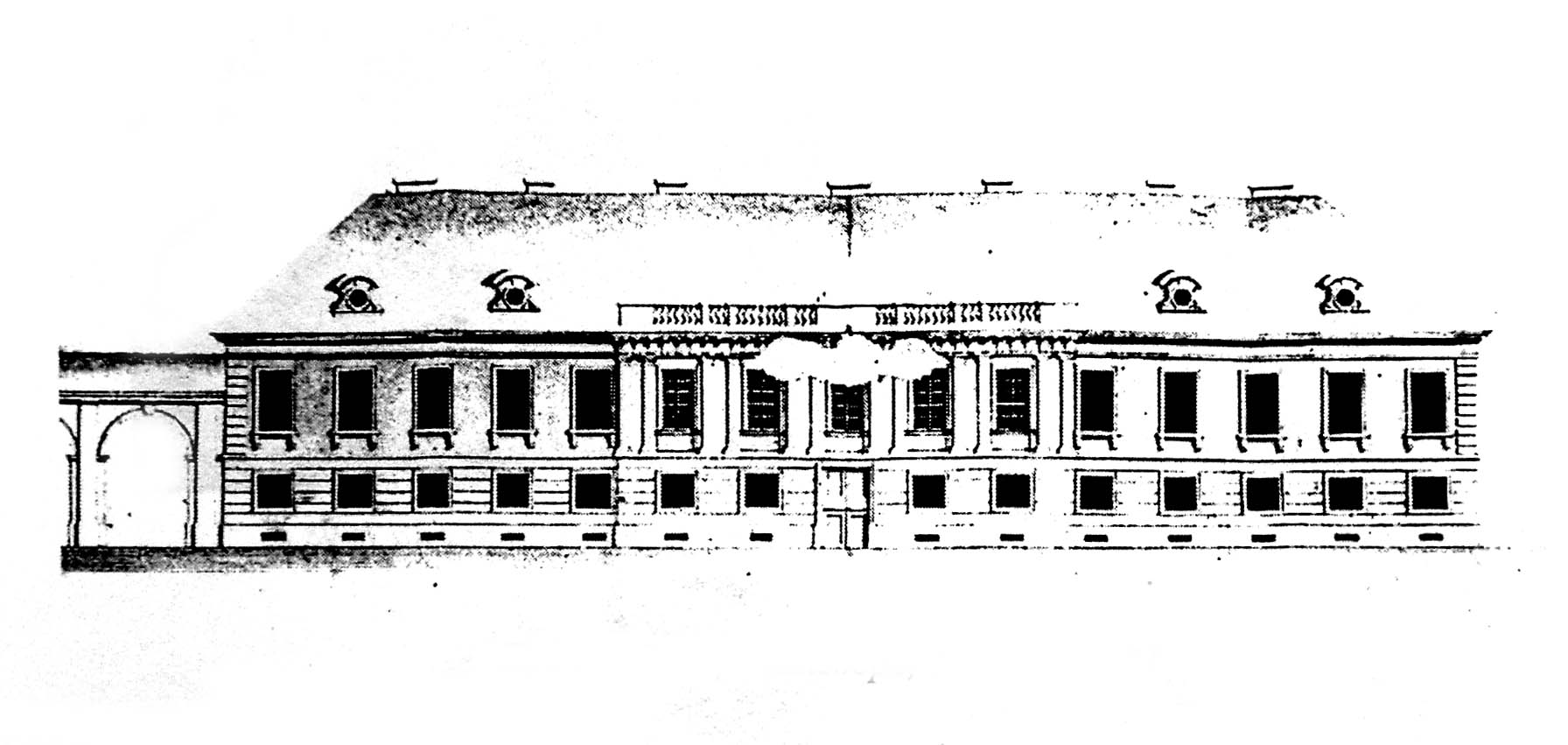
The previous palace. Architect Ignatius Hambres. Project: 1822.

The Potocki family, having sold its palace on the Galitskaya Square (now known as the Bessyatsky Palace), in 1822 bought real estate on the Wide Street (now Copernicus Street). On plans of Lviv 18th – first half of the 19th century. This section shows the planned city and several small buildings.

The first palace was built in the style of classicism, designed by architect Ignacy Chambrez. It was a two-story rectangular building with a high roof. The facade was symmetrical with a central risalite, crowned with an attic and a balustrade. The first tier of the facade was rustic, the second tier of risalita was decorated with six pairs of ionic pilasters. The owners were Maria Sanguszko and her husband Alfred Potocki. The palace was dismantled in 1860–1861. However, the construction of the new residence was delayed for three decades. Construction began only in 1880.

The design of the new palace was created in the style of Baroque, the era of French King Louis XIV by the French architect Louis Alphonse Rene Dovernut (fr. Louis Dauvergne). The project was modified by architects Julian Cybulski and Ludwik Baldwin-Ramułt and implemented under their guidance. In 1892 the project was exhibited at a building exhibition in Lviv. Potocki palace became the Luftwaffe headquarters when the Germans invaded Lviv.

== Potocki family - owners of the palace ==
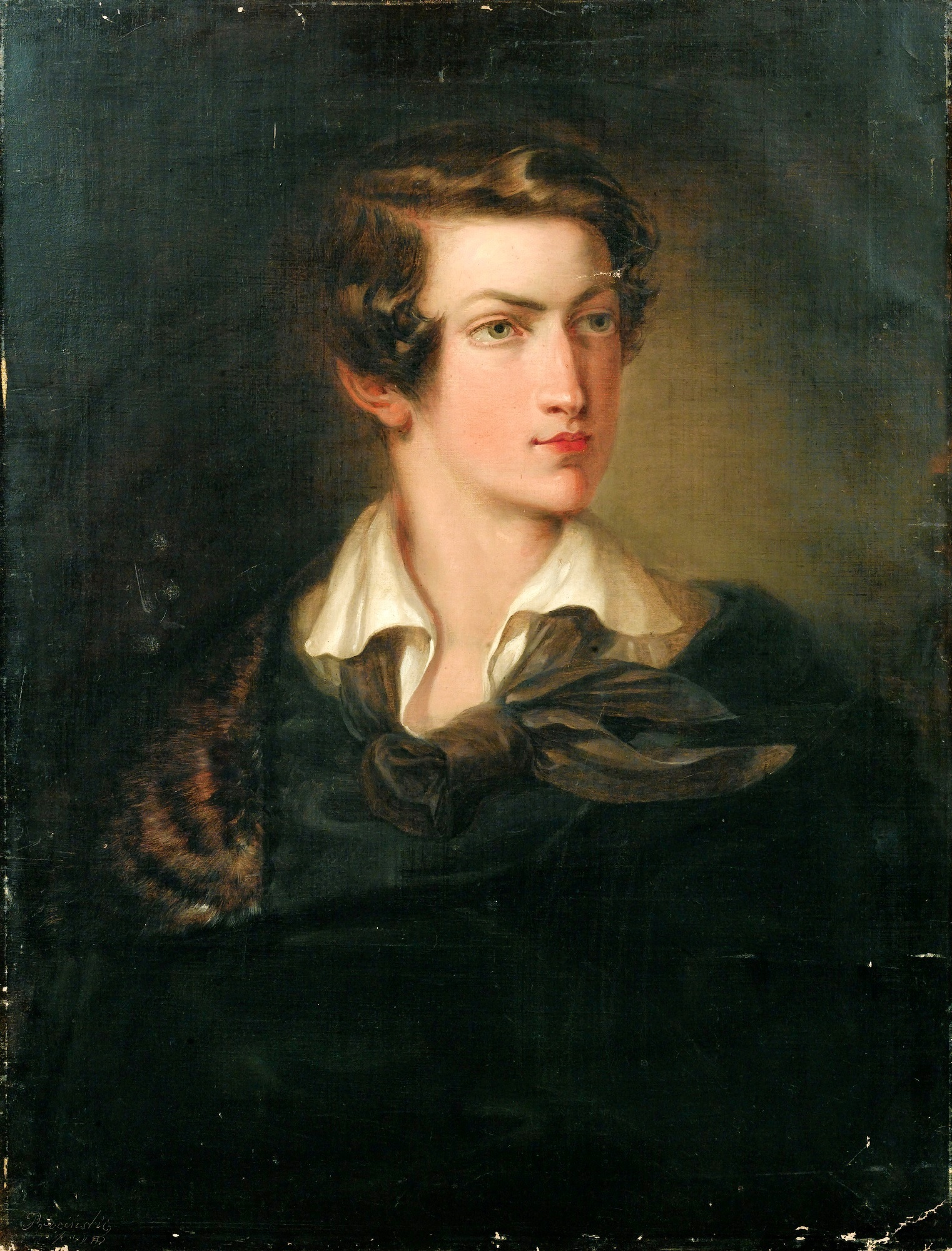
Alfred Józef Potocki

In 1851, in the town of Slavuta, Maria Klementyna Sanguszko (1830–1903) married Alfred Józef Potocki of the Pilawa Coat of Arms (1817–1889), an earl, political figure, marshal of the Galician Sejm, governor of the Kingdom of Galicia and Volodymyria, second ordynat of Łańcut. The Potocki family had four children: Roman, Julia, Klementyna (married Tyszkiewicz) and Józef Mikołaj.

After completing the diplomatic service, Alfred Potocki devoted his life to active political activity in Galicia. In 1863, he was elected ambassador to the Galician Sejm. He was a deputy to this representative body until his death in 1889. In 1875–1877 he was a dignified marshal of the Galician Sejm. During 1875–1883 he was the governor of Galicia. Known as patron of the arts and passionate connoisseur of French architecture. Alfred Potocki ordered the construction of the residence, but died prematurely in Paris on May 18, 1889. His palace was completed by his son, Roman Potocki and his wife Maria.

== Palace ==
The building is made in the style of French classicism, brick, plastered, H-shaped in plan, with a developed central avant-corps and lateral wings. It is also three storeys high with an attic. The facades are decorated with figured window frames and rustication, moulded balconies and balustrades. The front entrance is decorated with an arched portico with stucco and ionic columns. Stucco decoration authored by Petr Garasimovich and probably Leonard Marconi.

On the ground floor there are front halls for the reception of guests. Some widely used features as part of decoration include stucco, gilding, coloured marble, valuable breeds of wood, painting. From the street on the courtyard, there are the grand monumental gate with two wings decorated with a cartoon. For receptions in the Potocki palace there were places for crew entrance, meeting rooms. On the southwest side near the palace, stables with bas-reliefs of horses and services were built with unpublished red brick, allowing for access to the Ossolinski Street (now Stefanik, 7a). The Copernicus Palace separates the fence with the front door and guard gates. Tail gate opens onto the street. Silent. The total area of the palace is 3100 m².

By 1879 there was a large city park. Already at the end of the 19th – early-20th centuries around the Potocki Palace, a number of multistory buildings were built, some of which went out to the front facades to the street, and the rear parts to the palace. Therefore, the view of the Potocki palace remained open only from the Copernicus Street. At the end of the 1980s, in the palace park, a mine was laid for laying underground tram tunnels, and built an unsightly annex, which now houses the Museum of Ancient Ukrainian Book Art (Copernicus Street, 15a). At the initiative of BG Voznycky 2010, a park of castles and defensive structures of ancient Ukraine were laid in the park near the park, in which M 1:50 layouts of defensive structures were displayed.

== Historical chronology ==
In January through March 1919 the palace was the residence of the mission of Bartholomew.

On 22 November 1919, American pilot Edmund Graves dropped into the palace during an air show over the centre of Lviv on the 1st anniversary of the city's liberation. The plane crash and the explosion of its fuel tanks caused a fire on the upper floors and the roof of the palace. Graves's parachute failed to open and he fell to his death on the pavements below. The repair and restoration of the building lasted until 1931.

From 1945 to 1972 the palace was used by the Institute of Geology and Geochemistry of Combustible Minerals of the Academy of Sciences of the USSR.

The palace was restored again between 1973 and 1974.

In 1996, the Lviv Palace of Arts was erected next to the building. In the 2000s, the Potocki Palace was handed over to the Lviv Art Gallery.

A chapel in the Potocki Palace was opened in February 2015.

== Photos ==
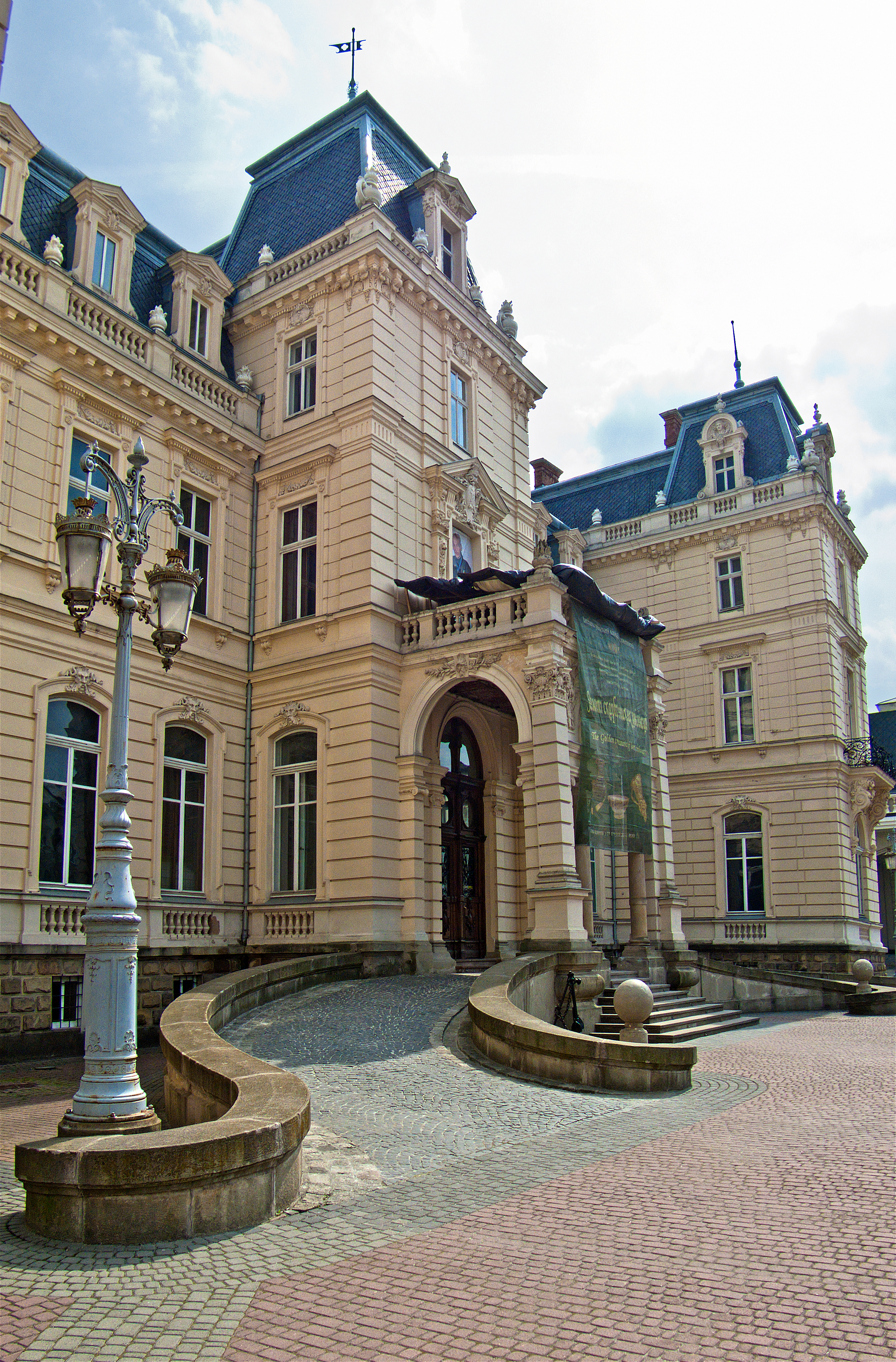
Lantern near the Entrance

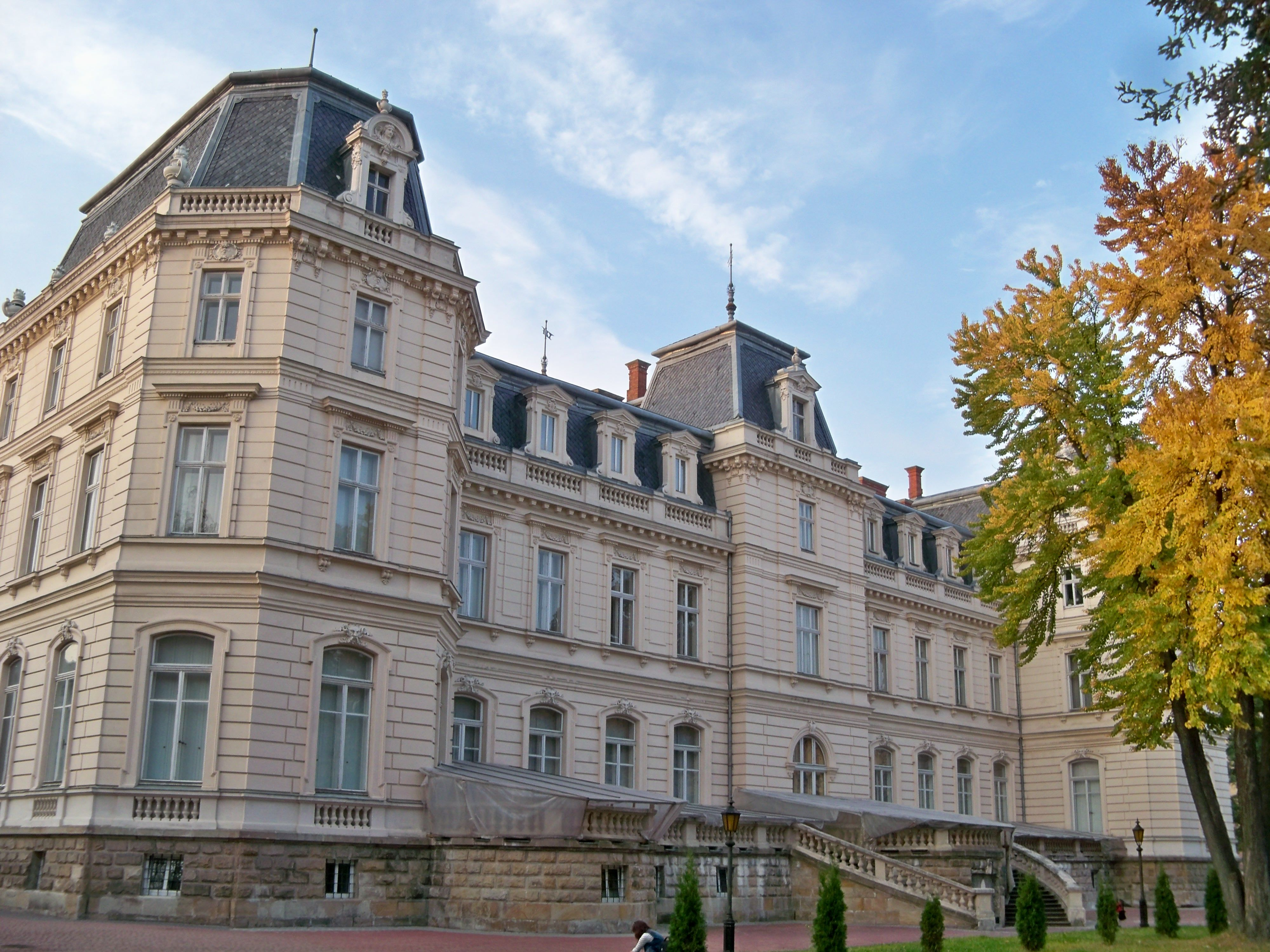
Side View of the Palace

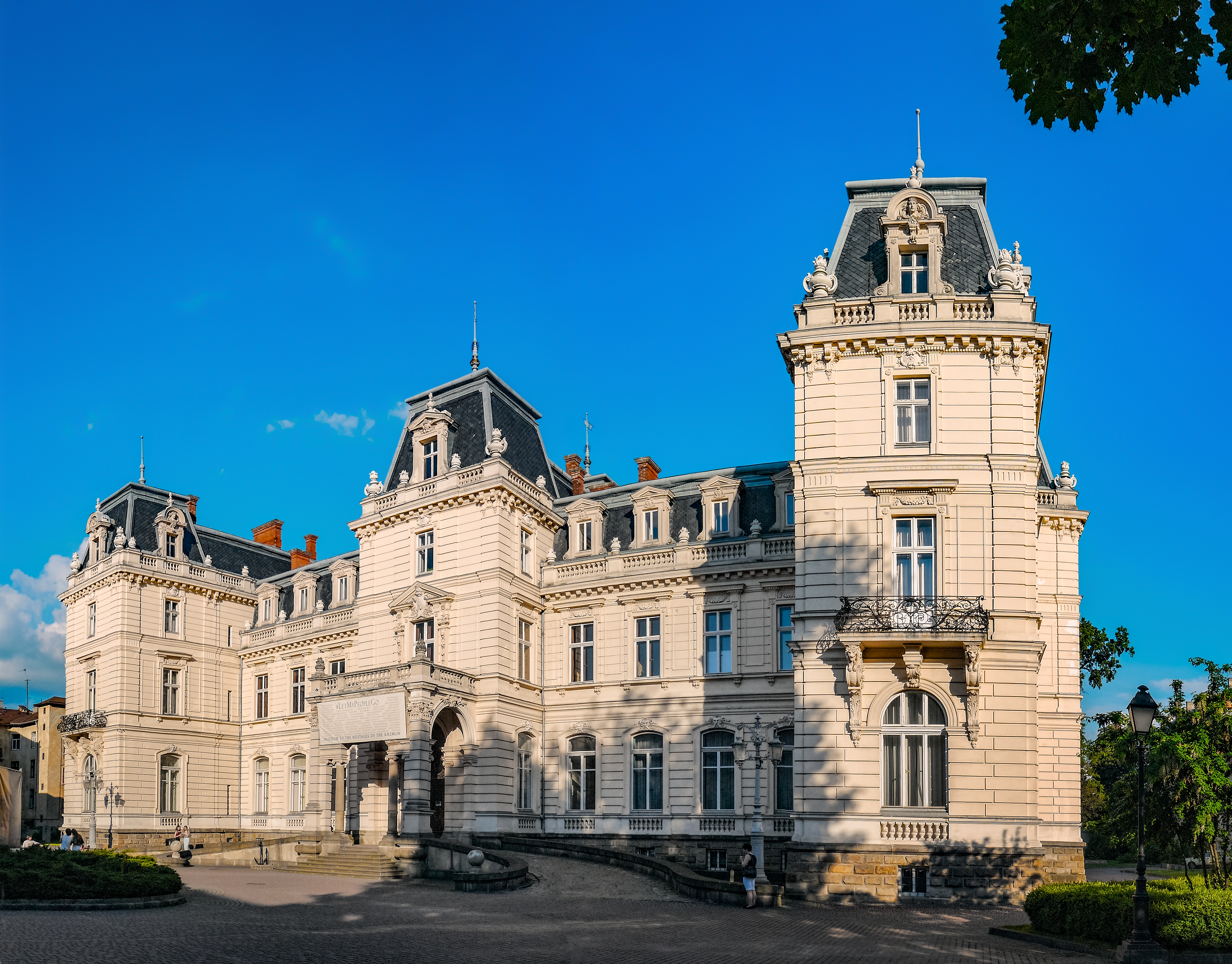
Facade of the palace

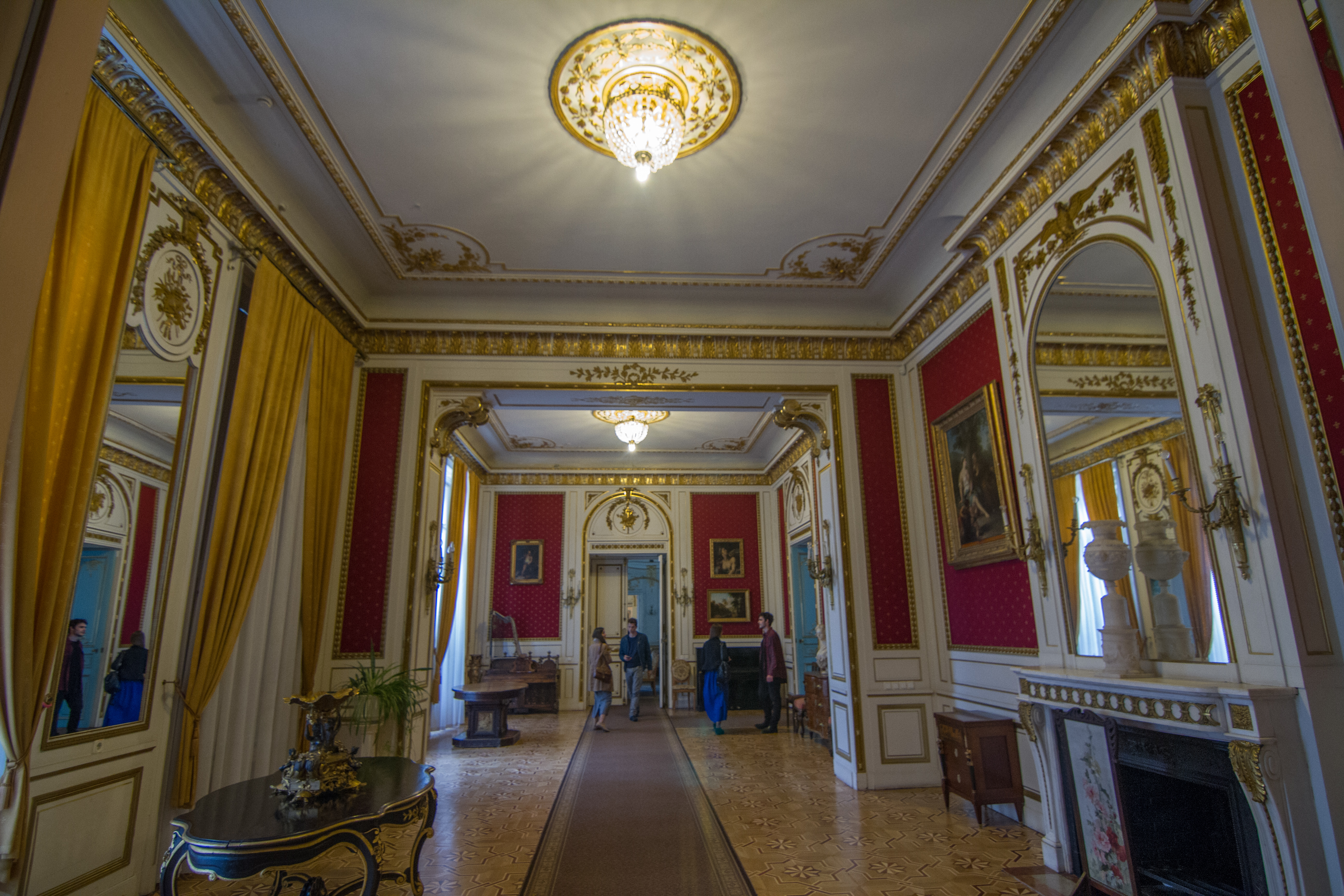
Palace interiors

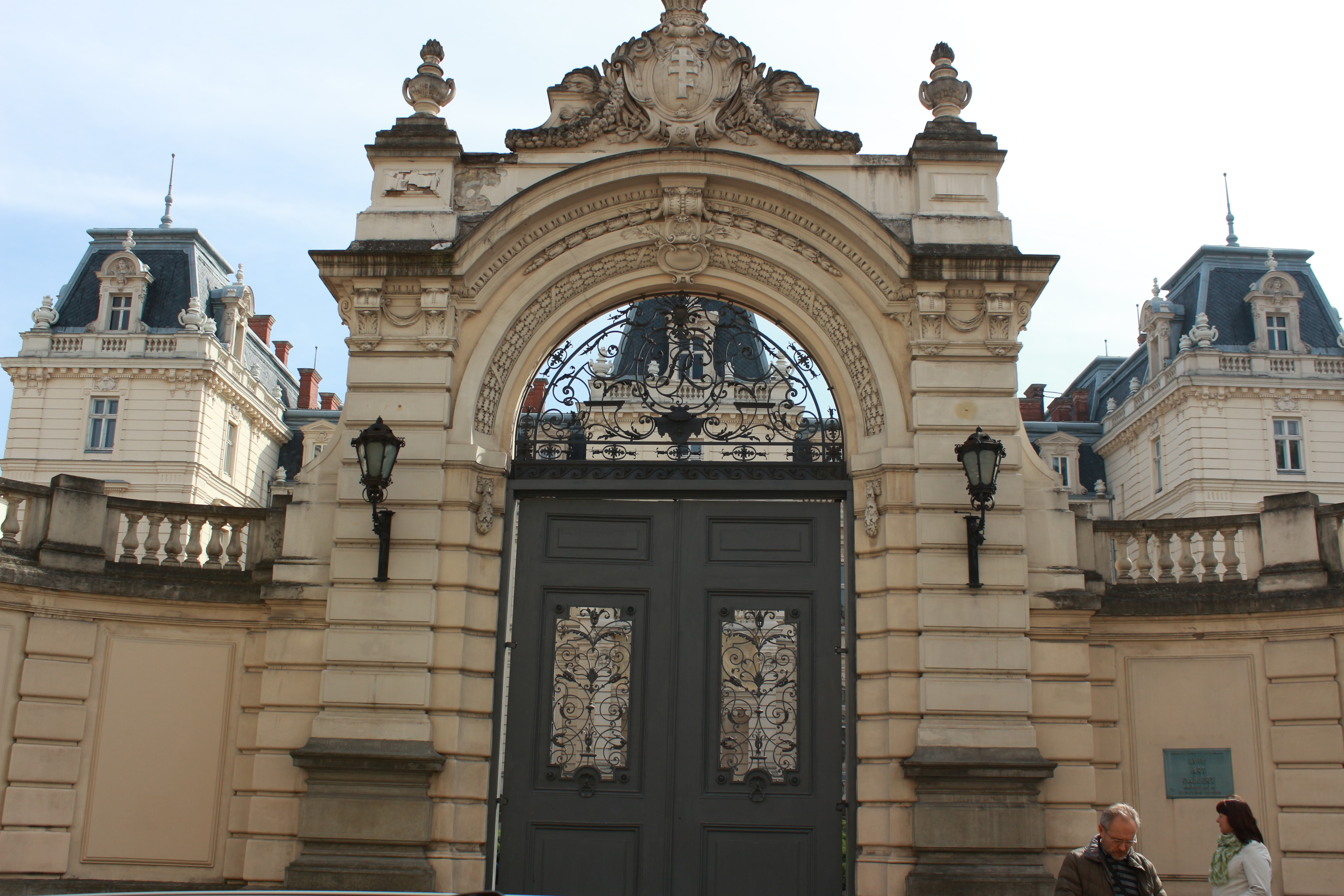
Front entrance at the Palace Gates

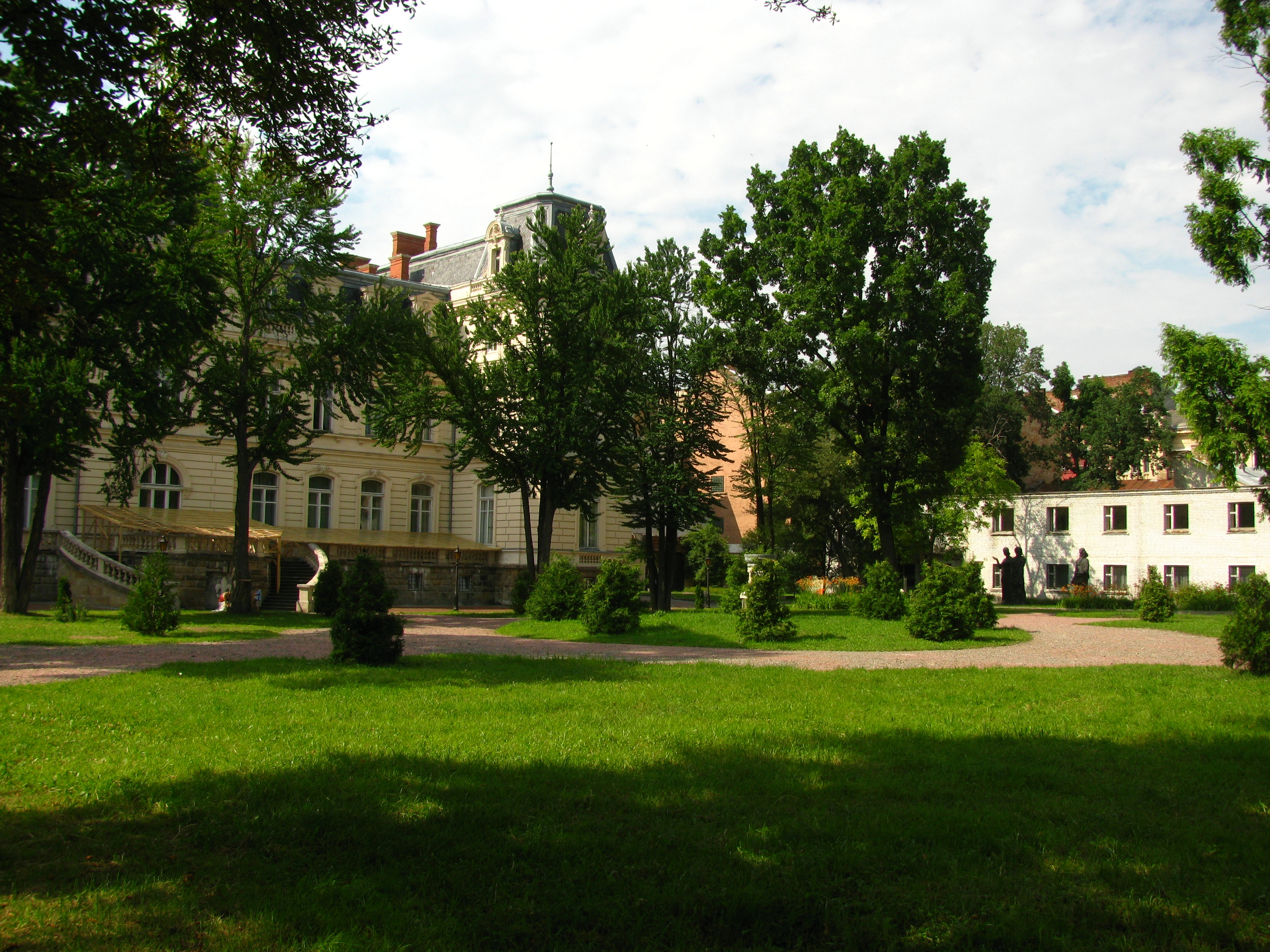
Courtyard located at the back of the Palace
