= Women's World Chess Championship 2015 =

Chess tournament in Sochi, Russia

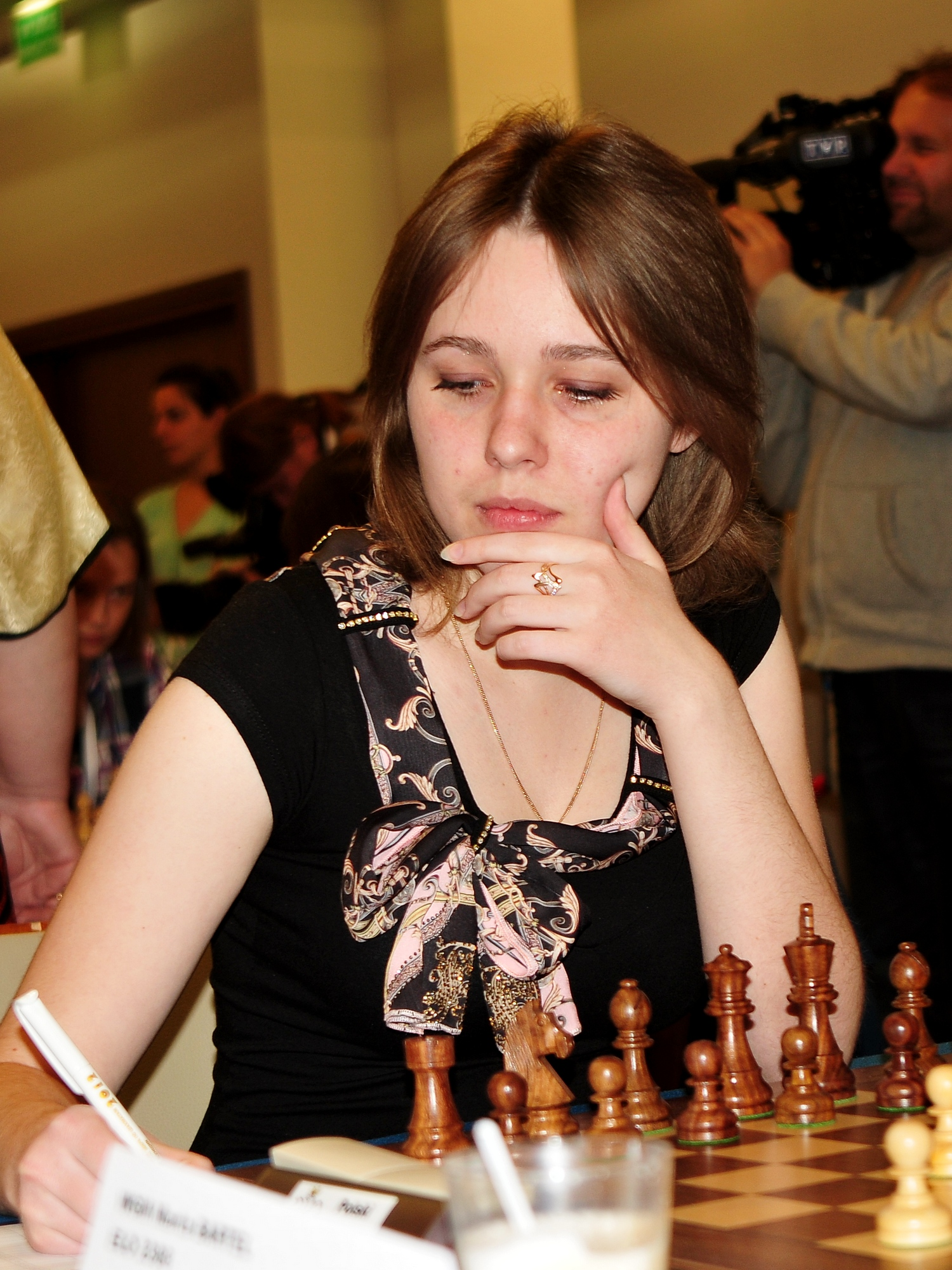
- Mariya Muzychuk, winner of the 2015 championship
- Location: Sochi, Russia
- Dates: 16 March – 7 April 2015
- Competitors: 64

Champion
- (Ukraine) Mariya Muzychuk

The Women's World Chess Championship was held from 16 March to 7 April 2015 in Sochi, Russia. It was a 64-player knockout tournament. It was originally scheduled from 11 to 31 October 2014 but problems in finding a sponsor and host city eventually forced international chess organisation FIDE to announce the postponement of the Championship on 24 September 2014, scheduling it for early 2015 in Sochi. The unclear state of the tournament was highly criticised by the Association of Chess Professionals (ACP).

In the final, Ukrainian Mariya Muzychuk, seeded 8th, defeated Russian Natalia Pogonina, seeded 31st. As a result of this victory, Muzychuk was awarded the title of Grandmaster (GM), qualified for the FIDE World Cup 2015, and earned the right to defend her title in a 2016 match against the winner of the Women's FIDE Grand Prix Series 2013-14, Hou Yifan.

== Participants ==
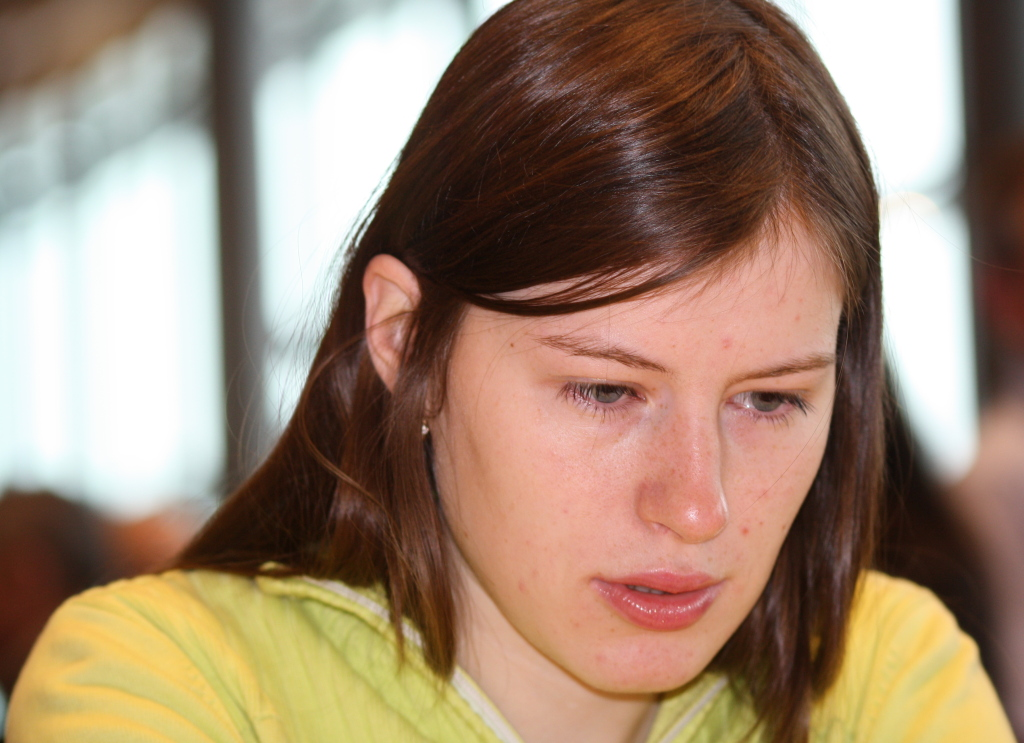
Natalia Pogonina, finalist of the championship

The players were selected through national chess championships, zonal tournaments and continental chess championships. 51 players from women's continental and zonal qualifiers: Europe 28, Asia 12, Americas 8 and Africa 3.

The qualified players were announced on 22 January 2015, subject to signing the contract.

Three former world champions were in the field: Alexandra Kosteniuk seeded 5th, Antoaneta Stefanova 9th and Anna Ushenina 15th. Notably, women's world number one and defending champion Hou Yifan from China opted not to play, because of a prior commitment to a chess tournament in Hawaii. Also absent from the world top 10 were Nana Dzagnidze and Kateryna Lagno. (They were replaced by two spots from E13.)

The participating players were seeded by their FIDE rating of March 2015.

1. Humpy Koneru (India), GM, 2581 (R)
2. Ju Wenjun (China), GM, 2557 (WC)
3. Anna Muzychuk (Ukraine), GM, 2552 (E12)
4. Viktorija Cmilyte (Lithuania), GM, 2530 (E12)
5. Alexandra Kosteniuk (Russia), GM, 2529 (E12)
6. Valentina Gunina (Russia), GM, 2528 (E12)
7. Zhao Xue (China), GM, 2527 (R)
8. Mariya Muzychuk (Ukraine), IM, 2526 (R)
9. Antoaneta Stefanova (Bulgaria), GM, 2522 (R)
10. Bela Khotenashvili (Georgia), GM, 2513 (E12)
11. Pia Cramling (Sweden), GM, 2495 (E13)
12. Dronavalli Harika (India), GM, 2492 (WC)
13. Elina Danielian (Armenia), GM, 2488 (E12)
14. Tan Zhongyi (China), WGM, 2487 (R)
15. Anna Ushenina (Ukraine), GM, 2486 (WC)
16. Alisa Galliamova (Russia), IM, 2484 (PN)
17. Tatiana Kosintseva (Russia), GM, 2483 (E12)
18. Marie Sebag (France), GM, 2482 (E12)
19. Lela Javakhishvili (Georgia), IM, 2481 (E12)
20. Elisabeth Paehtz (Germany), IM, 2479 (R)
21. Irina Krush (USA), GM, 2477 (Z2.1)
22. Hoang Thanh Trang (Hungary), GM, 2475 (E12)
23. Huang Qian (China), WGM, 2473 (AS13)
24. Natalia Zhukova (Ukraine), GM, 2471 (PN)
25. Monika Socko (Poland), GM, 2463 (E13)
26. Salome Melia (Georgia), IM, 2459 (E12)
27. Olga Girya (Russia), WGM, 2459 (E13)
28. Shen Yang (China), IM, 2459 (Z3.5)
29. Nino Khurtsidze (Georgia), IM, 2457 (E12)
30. Aleksandra Goryachkina (Russia), WGM, 2456 (J13)
31. Natalia Pogonina (Russia), WGM, 2456 (E12)
32. Lei Tingjie (China), WGM, 2444 (Z3.5)
33. Deysi Cori (Peru), WGM, 2444 (Z2.4)
34. Guo Qi (China), IM, 2443 (J12)
35. Lilit Mkrtchian (Armenia), IM, 2443 (E13)
36. Ekaterina Kovalevskaya (Russia), IM, 2438 (E13)
37. Alina Kashlinskaya (Russia), IM, 2436 (E13)
38. Ekaterina Atalik (Turkey), IM, 2419 (E13)
39. Irine Kharisma Sukandar (Indonesia), IM, 2415 (AS12)
40. Deimante Daulyte (Lithuania), IM, 2395 (E13)
41. Inna Gaponenko (Ukraine), IM, 2384 (E13)
42. Baira Kovanova (Russia), WGM, 2381 (E12)
43. Ketevan Arakhamia-Grant (Scotland), GM, 2379 (E13)
44. Sophie Milliet (France), IM, 2377 (E13)
45. Meri Arabidze (Georgia), IM, 2374 (E13)
46. Sopiko Guramishvili (Georgia), IM, 2367 (E13)
47. Wang Jue (China), WGM, 2365 (Z3.5)
48. Mary Ann Gomes (India), WGM, 2354 (Z3.7)
49. Carolina Lujan (Argentina), IM, 2349 (Z2.5)
50. Zhang Xiaowen (China), WGM, 2349 (Z3.5)
51. Guliskhan Nakhbayeva (Kazakhstan), WGM, 2337 (Z3.4)
52. Yaniet Marrero Lopez (Cuba), WGM, 2322 (Z2.3)
53. Tatev Abrahamyan (USA), WGM, 2322 (Z2.1)
54. Mitra Hejazipour (Iran), WIM, 2302 (Z3.1)
55. Kübra Öztürk (Turkey), WGM, 2284 (E13)
56. Yuanling Yuan (Canada), WIM, 2267 (Z2.2)
57. Nguyen Thi Thanh An (Vietnam), WGM, 2261 (Z3.3)
58. Marisa Zuriel (Argentina), WIM, 2219 (AM)
59. Camilla Baginskaite (USA), WGM, 2192 (Z2.1)
60. Irina Berezina (Australia), IM, 2182 (Z3.6)
61. Akter Liza Shamima (Bangladesh), WIM, 2130 (Z3.2)
62. Amina Mezioud (Algeria), WIM, 2071 (AF)
63. Shrook Wafa (Egypt), WGM, 2058 (AF)
64. Ayah Moaataz (Egypt), WIM, 2022 (AF)

=== Qualification paths ===
- WC: Semi-finalists of the Women's World Chess Championship 2012 and runner-up of 2013
- J12 and J13: World Junior Champions 2012 and 2013
- R: Rating (average of all published ratings from February 2013 to January 2014 was used) (5)
- E12 and E13: European Individual Championships 2012 and 2013 (28)
- AM: American Continental Chess Championship 2014
- AS12 and AS13: Asian Chess Championships 2012 and 2013
- AF: African Chess Championship 2013 (3)
- Z2.1 (3), Z2.2, Z2.3, Z2.4, Z2.5, Z3.1, Z3.2, Z3.3, Z3.4, Z3.5 (4), Z3.6, Z3.7: Zonal tournaments
- PN: FIDE President nominee (2)

== Schedule and prize money ==
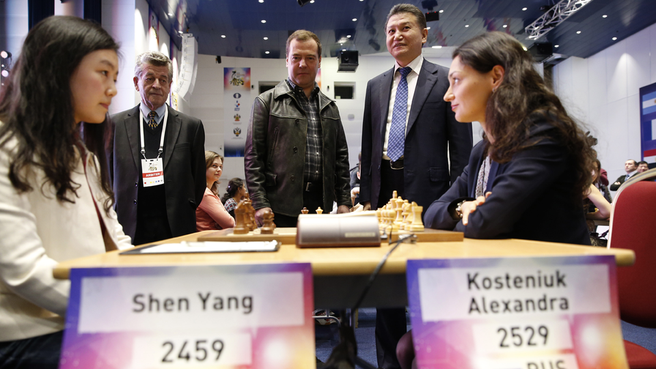
FIDE president Kirsan Ilyumzhinov (right), awaiting the second round.

Two days per match were followed by possible tie-breaks on the next day if the match was tied. The only rest day was 1 April the day after the semi-finals.

The total prize-money was 450,000 US dollars, the same as in 2010 and 2012.

Round	Matches	Tie-breaks	Prize-money (US$)
First round	17–18 March	19 March	3,750
Second round	20–21 March	22 March	5,500
Third round	23–24 March	25 March	8,000
Quarter-finals	26–27 March	28 March	12,000
Semi-finals	29–30 March	31 March	20,000
Final	2–5 April	6 April	loser 30,000 winner 60,000

== Results ==
=== Final match ===
Position: a8 black rook, g8 black king, c7 black pawn, e7 white rook, f7 black pawn, g7 black queen, c6 white pawn, d6 black pawn, d5 white bishop, g5 black knight, g4 white pawn, b3 white pawn, e3 white queen, g3 white king

Position after move 40 in game 4 of the final

The final was the only match of the tournament which consisted of four classical games (from 2 to 5 April 2015), played on consecutive days with a rest-day between the semi-final tie-breaks and match 1. Eventual tie-breaks, if needed, were scheduled to play on 6 April 2015, in the same manner as the whole tournament: two rapid games (25+10), i.e. 25 minutes for the whole game plus 10 seconds increment, the two rapid games (10+10), two blitz games (5+3) and an armageddon decider.

Pogonina had the white pieces in the first game. Before the final they had met only once, in the 2007 European Individual Chess Championship, which ended in a draw.

In the final game 4, white pieces belonged to Muzychuk, who opened the game with her favorite 1.е4. Pogonina responded with her favorite 1...е5. In the Scotch Four Knights Game she tried to avoid the main variations by putting the bishop to b4 via c5. The idea allowed Black to duck the home preparation of Muzychuk. White, however, achieved a spatial advantage and overall more favorable game after the opening. Later White decided to advance kingside pawns, weakening own king. The Black also had pawn weaknesses and a sharp and dynamically balanced position emerged. On the move 41 Muzychuk carried out a simplifying combination, transposing to an endgame with two strong passed pawns against a knight. Pogonina was left with no winning chances, and the game ended in a draw on the move 56 after the move repetition.

Women's World Chess Championship Final 2015
	Rating	1	2	3	4	Total
Mariya Muzychuk (Ukraine)	2526	½	1	½	½	2½
Natalia Pogonina (Russia)	2456	½	0	½	½	1½

=== Bracket ===
Players were seeded by their March rating. The standard bracket is used, i.e. seed #1 plays #64, #2 plays #63 and so on. The draw of who plays white first is done at the opening ceremony. Pairings published on 3 March.

Round of 64
(India) Humpy Koneru (1)	2
(Egypt) Ayah Moaataz (64)	0
(China) Lei Tingjie (32)	2
(Peru) Deysi Cori (33)	0
(Russia) Alisa Galliamova (16)	3½
(Argentina) Carolina Luján (49)	2½
(Russia) Tatiana Kosintseva (17)	5
(India) Mary Ann Gomes (48)	4
(Ukraine) Mariya Muzychuk (8)	2½
(Canada) Yuanling Yuan (56)	1½
(Poland) Monika Socko (25)	4
(Lithuania) Deimante Daulyte (40)	2
(Bulgaria) Antoaneta Stefanova (9)	1½
(Vietnam) Nguyen Thi Thanh An (57)	½
(Ukraine) Natalia Zhukova (24)	½
(Ukraine) Inna Gaponenko (41)	1½
(Lithuania) Viktorija Cmilyte (4)	2
(Bangladesh) Akter Liza Shamima (61)	0
(Georgia (country)) Nino Khurtsidze (29)	½
(Russia) Ekaterina Kovalevskaya (36)	1½
(Armenia) Elina Danielian (13)	½
(Cuba) Yaniet Marrero Lopez (52)	1½
(Germany) Elisabeth Paehtz (20)	2
(Georgia (country)) Meri Arabidze (45)	4
(Russia) Alexandra Kosteniuk (5)	2
(Australia) Irina Berezina (60)	0
(China) Shen Yang (28)	2½
(Russia) Alina Kashlinskaya (37)	1½
(India) Dronavalli Harika (12)	2
(United States) Tatev Abrahamyan (53)	0
(United States) Irina Krush (21)	1½
(France) Sophie Milliet (44)	½
(China) Ju Wenjun (2)	2
(Egypt) Shrook Wafa (63)	0
(Russia) Natalia Pogonina (31)	1½
(China) Guo Qi (34)	½
(Ukraine) Anna Ushenina (15)	1½
(China) Zhang Xiaowen (50)	½
(France) Marie Sebag (18)	1½
(China) Wang Jue (47)	½
(China) Zhao Xue (7)	3
(Argentina) Marisa Zuriel (58)	1
(Georgia (country)) Salome Melia (26)	3
(Indonesia) Irine Kharisma Sukandar (39)	1
(Georgia (country)) Bela Khotenashvili (10)	1½
(Turkey) Kübra Öztürk (55)	½
(China) Huang Qian (23)	2½
(Russia) Baira Kovanova (42)	1½
(Ukraine) Anna Muzychuk (3)	1½
(Algeria) Amina Mezioud (62)	½
(Russia) Aleksandra Goryachkina (30)	5
(Armenia) Lilit Mkrtchian (35)	4
(China) Tan Zhongyi (14)	1½
(Kazakhstan) Guliskhan Nakhbayeva (51)	½
(Georgia (country)) Lela Javakhishvili (19)	3½
(Georgia (country)) Sopiko Guramishvili (46)	2½
(Russia) Valentina Gunina (6)	2
(United States) Camilla Baginskaite (59)	0
(Russia) Olga Girya (27)	2
(Turkey) Ekaterina Atalik (38)	0
(Sweden) Pia Cramling (11)	2
(Iran) Mitra Hejazipour (54)	0
(Hungary) Hoang Thanh Trang (22)	½
(Scotland) Ketevan Arakhamia-Grant (43)	1½

Round of 32
(India) Humpy Koneru (1)	2
(China) Lei Tingjie (32)	0
(Russia) Alisa Galliamova (16)	1½
(Russia) Tatiana Kosintseva (17)	½
(Ukraine) Mariya Muzychuk (8)	3
(Poland) Monika Socko (25)	1
(Bulgaria) Antoaneta Stefanova (9)	2½
(Ukraine) Inna Gaponenko (41)	1½
(Lithuania) Viktorija Cmilyte (4)	1½
(Russia) Ekaterina Kovalevskaya (36)	½
(Cuba) Yaniet Marrero Lopez (52)	½
(Georgia (country)) Meri Arabidze (45)	1½
(Russia) Alexandra Kosteniuk (5)	1½
(China) Shen Yang (28)	½
(India) Dronavalli Harika (12)	2½
(United States) Irina Krush (21)	1½
(China) Ju Wenjun (2)	½
(Russia) Natalia Pogonina (31)	1½
(Ukraine) Anna Ushenina (15)	1½
(France) Marie Sebag (18)	2½
(China) Zhao Xue (7)	1½
(Georgia (country)) Salome Melia (26)	½
(Georgia (country)) Bela Khotenashvili (10)	4½
(China) Huang Qian (23)	3½
(Ukraine) Anna Muzychuk (3)	1½
(Russia) Aleksandra Goryachkina (30)	½
(China) Tan Zhongyi (14)	½
(Georgia (country)) Lela Javakhishvili (19)	1½
(Russia) Valentina Gunina (6)	2
(Russia) Olga Girya (27)	0
(Sweden) Pia Cramling (11)	1½
(Scotland) Ketevan Arakhamia-Grant (43)	½

Round of 16
(India) Humpy Koneru (1)	2
(Russia) Alisa Galliamova (16)	0
(Ukraine) Mariya Muzychuk (8)	1½
(Bulgaria) Antoaneta Stefanova (9)	½
(Lithuania) Viktorija Cmilyte (4)	1½
(Georgia (country)) Meri Arabidze (45)	2½
(Russia) Alexandra Kosteniuk (5)	1½
(India) Dronavalli Harika (12)	2½
(Russia) Natalia Pogonina (31)	3
(France) Marie Sebag (18)	1
(China) Zhao Xue (7)	1½
(Georgia (country)) Bela Khotenashvili (10)	½
(Ukraine) Anna Muzychuk (3)	1½
(Georgia (country)) Lela Javakhishvili (19)	½
(Russia) Valentina Gunina (6)	½
(Sweden) Pia Cramling (11)	1½

Quarter-finals
(India) Humpy Koneru (1)	1½
(Ukraine) Mariya Muzychuk (8)	2½
(Georgia (country)) Meri Arabidze (45)	½
(India) Dronavalli Harika (12)	1½
(Russia) Natalia Pogonina (31)	2½
(China) Zhao Xue (7)	1½
(Ukraine) Anna Muzychuk (3)	2½
(Sweden) Pia Cramling (11)	3½

Semi-finals
(Ukraine) Mariya Muzychuk (8)	3½
(India) Dronavalli Harika (12)	2½
(Russia) Natalia Pogonina (31)	2½
(Sweden) Pia Cramling (11)	1½

Final
(Ukraine) Mariya Muzychuk (8)	2½
(Russia) Natalia Pogonina (31)	1½
