= Mariya Muzychuk =

Ukrainian chess grandmaster (born 1992)

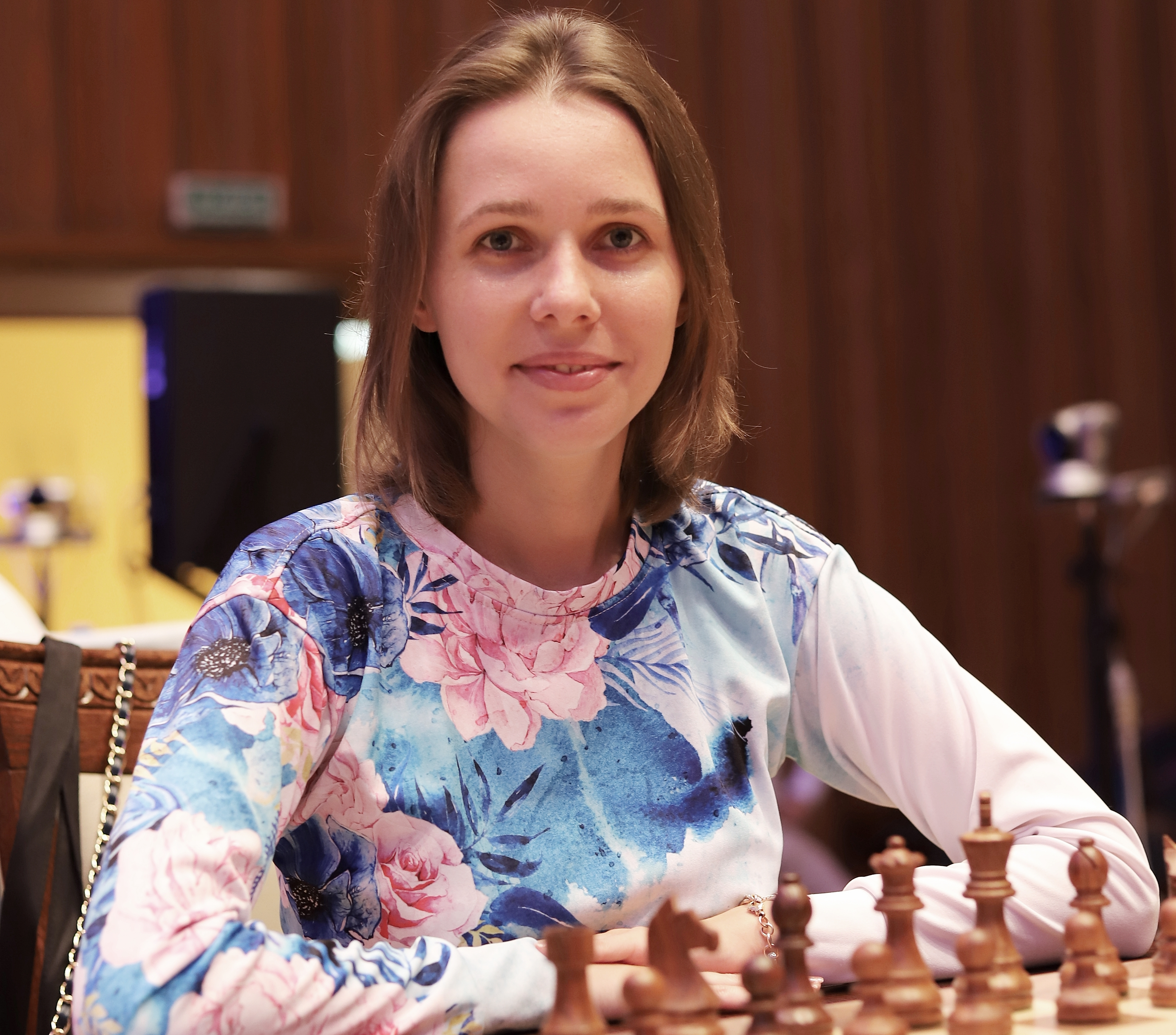
- Muzychuk in 2022

Personal information
- Born: Mariya Olehivna Muzychuk; 21 September 1992 (age 34) Lviv, Ukraine
- Relative: Anna Muzychuk (sister)

Chess career
- Country: Ukraine
- Title: Grandmaster (2015)
- Women's World Champion: 2015–2016
- Years active: 2002-present
- FIDE rating: 2463 (October 2026)
- Peak rating: 2563 (March 2016)

Mariya Olehivna Muzychuk (Ukrainian: Марі́я Оле́гівна Музичу́к; born 21 September 1992) is a Ukrainian chess grandmaster and women's world chess champion from April 2015 to March 2016. She is also a twice women's champion of Ukraine (2012, 2013), World Team and European Team champion with Ukraine in 2013. Muzychuk has experienced multiple successes with Ukraine at the Women's Chess Olympiad winning gold in 2022, silver in 2018 and bronze in 2012, 2014 and 2016.

== Career ==
Born in Lviv, Mariya Muzychuk was first taught chess at age two by her parents and at age three she knew all the chess pieces. At age six, Muzychuk took part in her first chess tournament.

Muzychuk won the under-10 girls' section at the 2002 European Youth Chess Championship in Peniscola, Spain. In November 2010 she was ranked as the fifth highest rated under-20 female player in the world.

She made it to the top-16 of the 2010 Women's World Chess Championship, but lost to Dronavalli Harika in an armageddon playoff after a tie in the regular match.

Muzychuk won the women's Ukrainian Chess Championship in 2012 and 2013. In 2014, she won the best woman's prize at the Gibraltar Masters tournament, where she also earned a grandmaster norm.

She won the Women's World Chess Championship 2015. In the first round, she drew with Yuanling Yuan in the classical games and then defeated her in the tiebreaks. In round two, she drew with Monika Socko in the classical games and defeated her in the tiebreaks. In round three, she defeated former Women's World Chess Champion Antoaneta Stefanova in the classical games by a score of 1½–½. In the quarter-final she defeated number one seed Humpy Koneru in the tiebreaks (2½–1½), and then beat Dronavalli Harika in the semi-final by tiebreaks (3½–2½). In the final she beat Natalia Pogonina with a score of 2½–1½. As a result of her victory, she obtained the Grandmaster title and qualified for the 2015 Chess World Cup which was held in Baku, Azerbaijan. In 2015, Muzychuk was awarded the Order of Merit, 3rd Class by Ukrainian President Petro Poroshenko. The holder and the winner of the honorary FIDE award of Caïssa as the 2015 best female chess player. The Chess Award of Caïssa, designed and executed by artisans of the Lobortas Classic Jewelry House, was solemnly presented on September 8, 2016 during the 42nd Chess Olympiad in Baku.

She lost her title against Hou Yifan in the Women's World Chess Championship 2016 by 3–6. In 2017 she refused to play in the Women's World Chess Championship 2017 in Iran out of protest for being obligated to wear a hijab.

She played board 1 for the Ukrainian team that won Gold at Chess Olympiad 2022, they went undefeated with three draws, This was Ukraine's second Gold at the Women's Chess Olympiad, first being in 2006.

== Playing style ==
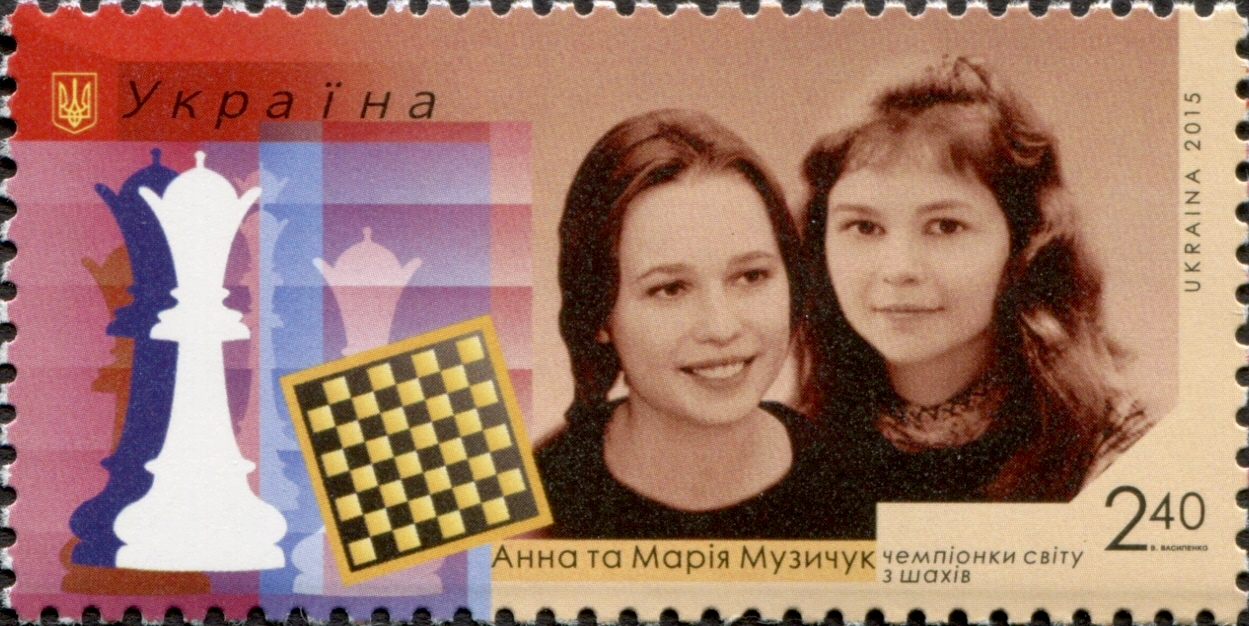
2015 Ukrainian postage stamp featuring the sisters Muzychuk

In openings, Muzychuk typically plays King's Pawn Openings as White and the Sicilian Defence and Dutch Defence with Black. Muzychuk has the ability to find unexpected tactical tricks, which sometimes compensates for flaws in her positional understanding. During her World Championship match against Natalia Pogonina, Muzychuk was called "Miss Tactics" by the media.

== Personal life ==
She has an older sister, Anna Muzychuk, who is also a leading chess player. Apart from chess, both sisters also play table tennis.

== Awards and honors ==
- Order of Merit (Third Class)

Preceded by Hou Yifan	Women's World Chess Champion; 2015–2016	Succeeded by Hou Yifan
