= Natalia Pogonina =

Russian chess player (born 1985)

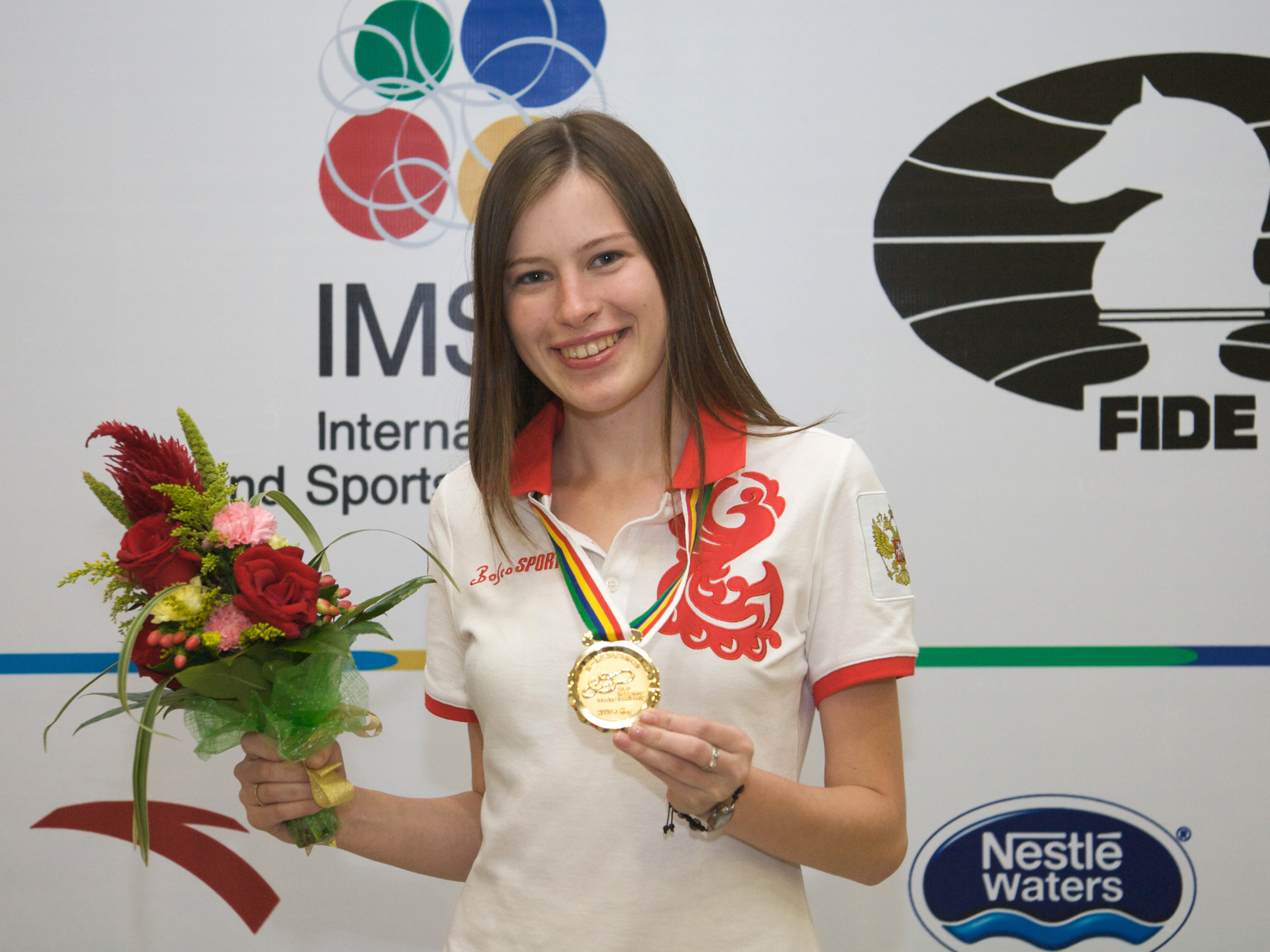

Personal information
- Born: Natalia Andreevna Pogonina; March 9, 1985 (age 41) Vladivostok, Russian SFSR, Soviet Union
- Spouse: Peter Zhdanov (m. 2009)

Chess career
- Country: Russia
- Title: Woman Grandmaster (2004)
- Peak rating: 2508 (July 2014)

Natalia Andreevna Pogonina (Russian: Ната́лья Андре́евна Пого́нина; born March 9, 1985) is a Russian chess player who holds the FIDE title of Woman Grandmaster (WGM). She is the runner-up of the Women's World Chess Championship 2015. She is a two time Russian Women's Champion (in 2012 and 2018).

Pogonina was a member of the gold medal-winning Russian team at the Women's Chess Olympiads of 2012 and 2014, and at the 2011 Women's European Team Chess Championship.

== Chess career ==
Pogonina learned to play chess at the age of five, as her grandfather taught her the basics of the game. She has been studying chess since 1993 after winning the school's checkers tournament.

She achieved notice for the first time in 1998 when she won the Russian under-14 girls championship. Natalia Pogonina has won two gold medals at the European Youth Chess Championship, in the U16 girls category in 2000 and U18 girls in 2003. In 2004, Natalia Pogonina was awarded the title of Woman Grandmaster. Some of her other victories are winning the Bykova Memorial in 2005, Rudenko Memorial in 2007, bronze medal at North Urals Cup tournament and sharing first place at the women's World University Chess Championship in 2008.

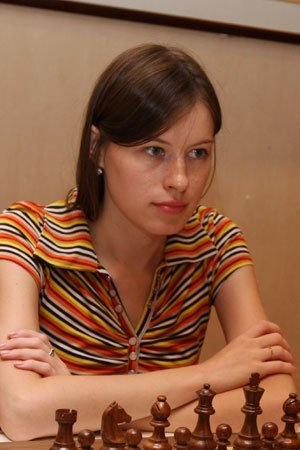
Natalia Pogonina – Russia vs. China match, 2008

In 2008, she won the gold medal in team blitz and bronze medal in team rapid chess at the first World Mind Sport Games in Beijing and scored 6/7 on board 5 for the Russian team in the Women's Chess Olympiad. She finished first (with 8 points from 9 games) at the prestigious Moscow Open 2009, and won the bronze medal at the Women's European Individual Championship 2009 (on tie-breaks). In 2011 Pogonina won gold medals at both the Women's European Club Cup and the European Team Chess Championship, as well as got silver at the Women's World Team Chess Championship. In August 2012 she won the Women's Russian Chess Championship with a score +4 =5 -0.

In 2012, she played eight of the eleven rounds on the reserve board (board 5) for the Russian women's team, which won the gold medal at the 40th Chess Olympiad in Istanbul. She scored +6=1-1 and won the gold medal for her individual performance on board 5. In 2014, she played for the Russian women's team and won another gold medal at the 41st Chess Olympiad in Tromsø.

She reached the final of the 2015 Women's World Championship and lost to Mariya Muzychuk.

== Other chess-related activities ==
She is a columnist at Chess.com since 2009. Has chess blogs at Sports.ru and RedHotPawn.com. Natalia Pogonina served as host and commentator of chess events at a number of chess websites, most notably, ChessGames.com and Chessdom.com. Announced in 2009 that she and Peter Zhdanov will release a book titled "Chess Kama Sutra". The book has not been published so far, but has received a lot of attention from international media. In 2009 Natalia Pogonina became an ambassador of the Chess Elite software.

== Personal life ==
In 2008 Pogonina was studying for an MA in law at the Saratov State Academy of Law. Her hobbies include flamenco, music, photography, travelling, sports, literature and poetry. Her handle on the Internet Chess Club is "Bagira".

On June 5, 2009, she married IT-specialist Peter Zhdanov. In 2009, she gave birth to a son, Nikolai.

== Sample game ==
Pogonina vs. Stefanova, Krasnoturinsk 2007

Position: b8 black rook, d8 black queen, f8 black rook, g8 black king, c7 black pawn, f7 black pawn, g7 black pawn, h7 black pawn, a6 black pawn, c6 black knight, a5 white pawn, c5 black bishop, d5 black knight, e5 black pawn, c3 white pawn, d3 white pawn, f3 white queen, h3 white pawn, c2 white bishop, d2 white knight, f2 white pawn, g2 white pawn, a1 white rook, c1 white bishop, f1 white rook, g1 white king

In this position after move 15 in the 2007 North Urals Cup game between Natalia Pogonina and Antoaneta Stefanova, Pogonina (White) sacrifices a pawn to initiate a promising attack.

After this 25-move victory with the Neo-Archangelsk variation of Ruy Lopez over former FIDE Women's World Champion Antoaneta Stefanova, Natalia Pogonina became co-leader in the North Urals Cup-2007 tournament. (Analysis by T. Grabuzova, ChessPro)

1.e4 e5 2.Nf3 Nc6 3.Bb5 a6 4.Ba4 Nf6 5.O-O Bc5 6.c3 b5 7.Bc2 d6 8.a4 Bg4 9.h3 Bxf3 10.Qxf3 b4 11.a5 O–O 12.d3 Rb8 13.Nd2 d5 14.exd5 bxc3 15.bxc3 Nd5 (See diagram) 16.d4 More solid is 16. Qe4 with similar ideas, but without sacrificing a pawn. 16...exd4 17.Qd3 g6 17...Nf6 doesn't work since after 18.Ne4 Nxe4 19.Qxe4 White come up with the decisive fork. 18.Qc4 18.Qxa6 could be met with 18...Ne5 with the idea to counter 19.Ne4 with a nice move 19...Nxc3! White has to decide whether to force a draw by playing 20.Nxc5 Ra8 21.Qb7 Rb8 or to try to demonstrate the potential of the passed a-pawn, supported by two bishops, after 20.Nxc3 dxc3 which led to a position with mutual chances. 18...Rb5 19.Ne4 Ne5? White's decisiveness is rewarded surprisingly quickly. This mistake seems to be uncharacteristic of Antoaneta Stefanova who is, in general, in her element when playing complicated positions with tactical opportunities for both sides. After a reasonable 19...Nc3 White would have been facing certain problems. For instance, 20.Bg5 (White's queen is badly placed. So, 20.Nxc5? loses immediately to 20...Ne5, while after 20.Nxc3 dxc3 the threats Ne5 and Nxa5 leave white feeling uncomfortable) is answered by 20...Qc8 21.Nc3 (21.Nxc5? Ne5) 21...dxc3 22.Bf6 (22.Qxc3? Bd4 23.Qxc6 Bxa1 and white has no real compensation for the sacrificed material) 22...Qe6 23.Qxc3 Bb4 White can't develop the initiative: 24.Qf3 Ne5 25.Qf4 Rxa5 26.Rab1 Be7 27.Bxe7 Qxe7 28.Rfe1 f6 leaves black with two “healthy” extra pawns for no real compensation. However, after Black's mistake the rest is simple: 20.Qxd5 d3 21.Qxd8 Rxd8 22.Ba4 Rxa5 23.Bg5 Rb8 24.Bf6 Bf8 25.Bxe5 25...Rxe5 26.Nf6+ and 27.Nd7 1-0
