= Women's World Chess Championship 2008 =

Chess tournament in Nalchik, Russia

The Women's World Chess Championship 2008 took place from August 28, 2008 to September 18 in Nalchik, Russia. It was won by Alexandra Kosteniuk, who beat Hou Yifan in the final by 2½ to 1½.

For the fifth time, the championship took the form of a 64-player knock-out tournament.

== Participants ==
Players were seeded by their Elo ratings (July 2008 list), except that defending champion Xu Yuhua was the no. 1 seed.

1. Xu Yuhua (CHN), 2483, GM (WC)
2. Humpy Koneru (IND), 2622, GM (R)
3. Hou Yifan (CHN), 2557, WGM (R)
4. Antoaneta Stefanova (BUL), 2550, GM (R)
5. Pia Cramling (SWE), 2544, GM (R)
6. Marie Sebag (FRA), 2529, GM (E06)
7. Zhao Xue (CHN), 2522, GM (Z3.5)
8. Tatiana Kosintseva (RUS), 2511, IM (E06)
9. Alexandra Kosteniuk (RUS), 2510, GM (R)
10. Viktorija Čmilytė (LTU), 2508, IM (WC)
11. Anna Muzychuk (SLO), 2504, IM (E06)
12. Ruan Lufei (CHN), 2499, WGM (AS)
13. Natalia Zhukova (UKR), 2489, WGM (E06)
14. Maia Chiburdanidze (GEO), 2489, GM (R)
15. Hoang Thanh Trang (HUN), 2487, GM (E07)
16. Elisabeth Pähtz (GER), 2481, IM (E06)
17. Anna Ushenina (UKR), 2476, IM (E06)
18. Monika Soćko (POL), 2473, IM (E07)
19. Irina Krush (USA), 2470, IM (Z2.1)
20. Inna Gaponenko (UKR), 2468, IM (E06)
21. Lela Javakhishvili (GEO), 2461, IM (E07)
22. Dronavalli Harika (IND), 2461, IM (Z3.2)
23. Nadezhda Kosintseva (RUS), 2460, IM (E07)
24. Ekaterina Korbut (RUS), 2459, IM (E07)
25. Anna Zatonskih (USA), 2446, IM (Z2.1)
26. Shen Yang (CHN), 2445, WGM (J06)
27. Lilit Mkrtchian (ARM), 2436, IM (E06)
28. Tania Sachdev (IND), 2432, IM (AS)
29. Natasa Bojkovic (SRB), 2423, IM (E07)
30. Iweta Rajlich (POL), 2417, IM (E07)
31. Maia Lomineishvili (GEO), 2414, IM (E07)
32. Nino Khurtsidze (GEO), 2413, IM (E07)
33. Svetlana Matveeva (RUS), 2412, IM (WC)
34. Sopiko Khukhashvili (GEO), 2408, IM (E07)
35. Batkhuyag Munguntuul (MGL), 2406, WGM (PN)
36. Ju Wenjun (CHN), 2389 (Z3.5)
37. Tan Zhongyi (CHN), 2387 (Z3.5)
38. Eva Moser (AUT), 2383, IM (E07)
39. Ketino Kachiani-Gersinska (GER), 2374, IM (E07)
40. Tea Bosboom-Lanchava (NED), 2358, IM (E06)
41. Sopio Gvetadze (GEO), 2355, IM (E06)
42. Nisha Mohota (IND), 2354, WGM (AS)
43. Vera Nebolsina (RUS), 2350, WGM (J07)
44. Claudia Amura (ARG), 2345, WGM (AM)
45. Zhang Jilin (CHN), 2344, WGM (Z3.5)
46. Elena Sedina (ITA), 2344, IM (E06)
47. Sabina-Francesca Foisor (ROM), 2337, WGM (E07)
48. Le Thanh Tu (VIE), 2325, WGM (Z3.3)
49. Ilaha Kadimova (AZE), 2324, WGM (E06)
50. Maritza Arribas Robaina (CUB), 2323, WGM (Z2.3)
51. Nguyen Thi Thanh An (VIE), 2323, WGM (AS)
52. Katerina Rohonyan (USA), 2321, WGM (Z2.1)
53. Irina Zakurdjaeva (RUS), 2308, WGM (E07)
54. Maria Velcheva (BUL), 2281, WGM (E06)
55. Valentina Golubenko (CRO), 2271, WGM (E07)
56. Atousa Pourkashiyan (IRI), 2269, WIM (Z3.1)
57. Nafisa Muminova (UZB), 2242 (Z3.4)
58. Marisa Zuriel (ARG), 2231, WIM (Z2.5)
59. Anna Gasik (POL), 2211, WFM (PN)
60. Sarai Sanchez Castillo (VEN), 2202, WGM (AM)
61. Karen Zapata (PER), 2180, WIM (Z2.4)
62. Mona Khaled (EGY), 2007, WGM (AF)
63. Yorsa Alaa El Din (EGY), 1959, WIM (AF)
64. Anzel Solomons (RSA), 1895, WIM (AF)

=== Qualification paths ===
- WC: Women's World Champion and semi-finalists of the Women's World Chess Championship 2006 (3)
- J06 and J07: World Junior Champions 2006 and 2007
- R: Rating (average of the FIDE rating lists of July 2006 and January 2007) (6)
- E06 and E07: European Individual Chess Championships 2006 and 2007 (28)
- AM: American Continental Chess Championship 2007 (2)
- AS: Asian Chess Championship 2007 (4)
- AF: African Chess Championship 2007 (3)
- Z2.1 (3), Z2.3, Z2.4, Z2.5, Z3.1, Z3.2, Z3.3, Z3.4, Z3.5 (4): Zonal tournaments
- PN: FIDE President nominee (2)

=== Absentees ===
The world's no. 1 female player (and 22nd overall), Judit Polgár, never competed for the Women's World Championship and did not play this time either. World no. 3 and ex-champion, Xie Jun, had played little chess in recent years (four rated games since 2005) and also did not appear. Also 2006 World Championship's runner-up Alisa Galliamova didn't participate. Other absentees from the top 20 were Kateryna Lahno (ranked 12th), ex-champion Zhu Chen (15th) and Elina Danielian (16 th).

Some players refused to go to Nalchik. In their letters to FIDE, Canadian Natalia Khoudgarian and American Irina Krush both cited the general safety in the region of North Caucasus.

More players protested after the start of the 2008 South Ossetia war. On 12 August 2008, six Georgian players published an open letter asking to move the Championship to a safer place, which was endorsed by several other players (Monika Soćko, Irina Krush, Iweta Rajlich, Ketino Kachiani-Gersinska, Tea Bosboom-Lanchava, Claudia Amura, and Marie Sebag). On 15 August, the Chess Federation of Georgia published an open letter stating that the Georgian players will not participate in the Championship unless it is moved to another country. Argentinian Claudia Amura, whose opponent in the first round is Georgian Lela Javakhishvili, also published a letter to FIDE asking for the Championship to be moved.

The FIDE president Kirsan Ilyumzhinov published two letters in reply, on 13 August and 19 August. In his letters, he confirmed that the Championship would be held in Nalchik, appealed to everyone not to mix politics and sport, and stated that the organizers provided all the necessary security. This was seconded by Boris Kutin, president of the European Chess Union, and Arsen Kanokov, president of Kabardino-Balkaria and the chairman of the organizing committee. On 21 August, Ilyumzhinov published a letter to Georgian president Mikhail Saakashvili asking him to let Georgian players participate.

A total of 11 players did not arrive at the Championship. Besides the six Georgian players (Maia Chiburdanidze, Lela Javakhishvili, Maia Lomineishvili, Nino Khurtsidze, Sopiko Khukhashvili, and Sopio Gvetadze), these were Marie Sebag (France), Irina Krush (United States), Ekaterina Korbut (Russia), Tea Bosboom-Lanchava (Netherlands), and Karen Zapata (Peru).

== Tournament format ==
The Championship was conducted as a single-elimination tournament with 64 players and six rounds. In each encounter, players played two games at normal time controls (90 minutes for the first 40 moves followed by 30 minutes for the rest of the game, with an increment of 30 seconds per move from move one). If the score after two games was level, the tie-break was played. In the tie-break, two rapid games were played (25 minutes for the game, with addition of 10 seconds after each move). If the score was level after the rapid games, two blitz games were played (5 minutes for the game, with addition of 10 seconds after each move). If the score was level after the blitz, the decisive armageddon game was played. The time control was 6 minutes for White and 5 minutes for Black, with no addition. If the game was drawn, Black is declared the winner. The colours in the armageddon games were chosen by the player who won the drawing of lots.

In the final, four regular games were played instead of two, and the first (rapid) phase of tie-break would also have consisted of four games.

=== Ruling appeal ===
The final tiebreak game in the first round match between Monika Soćko and Sabina-Francesca Foisor ended in controversy. It was an armageddon blitz game in which Soćko (as White) had 6 minutes compared to 5 minutes Foisor (as Black), but White must win the game to advance to the next round whereas Black only needed to draw (or win). With time running out, a position was reached in which each player had only a king and a knight, a material combination which is a draw under normal circumstances. Just after this, Foisor's time ran out and the arbiter Zsuzsanna Veroci ruled it a draw, meaning that Foisor would advance. Soćko immediately protested, showing a position where checkmate is possible (but cannot be forced) and reminding the arbiters of the FIDE rules of chess which state that if one player runs out of time and the opponent has the possibility of checkmate, that player loses. Soćko filed an appeal, and the Appeals Committee agreed that she was correct on the rules. The game was ruled a win for Soćko and she advanced to the next round.

== Schedule ==
- Round 1: 29 August and 30 August, with tiebreaks on 31 August
- Round 2: 1 September and 2 September, with tiebreaks on 3 September
- Round 3: 4 September and 5 September, with tiebreaks on 6 September
- Quarterfinals: 7 September and 8 September, with tiebreaks on 9 September
- Semifinals: 10 September and 11 September, with tiebreaks on 12 September
- Final: 14 September to 17 September, with tiebreaks on 18 September

== Results ==
=== Final Match ===
Women's World Chess Championship Final 2008
	1	2	3	4	Total
Alexandra Kosteniuk (Russia)	1	½	½	½	2½
Hou Yifan (China)	0	½	½	½	1½

=== Bracket ===
1st Round
1	Xu Yuhua	1½
64	Anzel Solomons	½
33	Nino Khurtsidze
32	Svetlana Matveeva	w/o
17	Elisabeth Pähtz	4
48	Ilaha Kadimova	3
49	Anna Ushenina	1½
16	Le Thanh Tu	½
9	Tatiana Kosintseva	2
56	Nafisa Muminova	0
41	Anna Zatonskih	w/o
24	Tea Bosboom-Lanchava
25	Alexandra Kosteniuk	2
40	Atousa Pourkashiyan	0
57	Ekaterina Korbut	–
8	Sopio Gvetadze	–
5	Antoaneta Stefanova	w/o
60	Karen Zapata
37	Natasa Bojkovic	1½
28	Ju Wenjun	2½
21	Natalia Zhukova	1½
44	Katerina Rohonyan	2½
53	Inna Gaponenko	1½
12	Zhang Jilin	½
13	Pia Cramling	1½
52	Sarai Sanchez Castillo	½
45	Tania Sachdev	½
20	Tan Zhongyi	1½
29	Ruan Lufei	1½
36	Irina Zakurdjaeva	½
61	Lela Javakhishvili
4	Claudia Amura	w/o
3	Hou Yifan	2
62	Mona Khaled	0
35	Iweta Rajlich	0
30	Batkhuyag Munguntuul	2
19	Irina Krush
46	Elena Sedina	w/o
51	Nguyen Thi Thanh An	w/o
14	Maia Chiburdanidze
11	Marie Sebag
54	Anna Gasik	w/o
43	Lilit Mkrtchian	3½
22	Eva Moser	2½
27	Dronavalli Harika	2
38	Vera Nebolsina	0
59	Maria Velcheva	0
6	Anna Muzychuk	2
7	Zhao Xue	2
58	Marisa Zuriel	0
39	Shen Yang	1½
26	Ketino Kachiani-Gersinska	½
23	Nisha Mohota	0
42	Nadezhda Kosintseva	2
55	Valentina Golubenko	½
10	Viktorija Čmilytė	1½
15	Hoang Thanh Trang	1½
50	Maritza Arribas Robaina	½
47	Sabina-Francesca Foisor	3
18	Monika Soćko	4
31	Maia Lomineishvili	–
34	Sopiko Khukhashvili	–
63	Yorsa Alaa El Din	0
2	Humpy Koneru	2

2nd Round
1	Xu Yuhua	½
33	Svetlana Matveeva	1½
16	Elisabeth Pähtz	½
17	Anna Ushenina	1½
8	Tatiana Kosintseva	1½
25	Anna Zatonskih	½
9	Alexandra Kosteniuk	w/o
4	Antoaneta Stefanova	3
36	Ju Wenjun	1
52	Katerina Rohonyan	1½
20	Inna Gaponenko	2½
5	Pia Cramling	1½
37	Tan Zhongyi	½
12	Ruan Lufei	1½
44	Claudia Amura	½
3	Hou Yifan	2
35	Batkhuyag Munguntuul	0
46	Elena Sedina	3
51	Nguyen Thi Thanh An	1
59	Anna Gasik	½
27	Lilit Mkrtchian	1½
22	Dronavalli Harika	2½
11	Anna Muzychuk	1½
7	Zhao Xue	½
26	Shen Yang	1½
23	Nadezhda Kosintseva	2½
10	Viktorija Čmilytė	1½
15	Hoang Thanh Trang	1½
18	Monika Soćko	½
2	Humpy Koneru	w/o

3rd Round
33	Svetlana Matveeva	0
17	Anna Ushenina	2
8	Tatiana Kosintseva	½
9	Alexandra Kosteniuk	1½
4	Antoaneta Stefanova	2
20	Inna Gaponenko	0
5	Pia Cramling	1½
12	Ruan Lufei	½
3	Hou Yifan	3
46	Elena Sedina	1
27	Lilit Mkrtchian	1½
22	Dronavalli Harika	½
26	Shen Yang	3½
23	Nadezhda Kosintseva	2½
15	Hoang Thanh Trang	½
2	Humpy Koneru	1½

Quarterfinals
17	(Ukraine) Anna Ushenina	½
9	(Russia) Alexandra Kosteniuk	1½
4	(Bulgaria) Antoaneta Stefanova	½
5	(Sweden) Pia Cramling	1½
3	(China) Hou Yifan	1½
27	(Armenia) Lilit Mkrtchian	½
26	(China) Shen Yang	0
2	(India) Humpy Koneru	2

Semifinals
9	(Russia) Alexandra Kosteniuk	1½
5	(Sweden) Pia Cramling	½
3	(China) Hou Yifan	4
2	(India) Humpy Koneru	2

Finals
9	(Russia) Alexandra Kosteniuk	2½
3	(China) Hou Yifan	1½
