= Women's Chess Olympiad =

FIDE women's chess tournament for national teams

The Women's Chess Olympiad is an event held by FIDE (the International Chess Federation) since 1957 (every two years since 1972), where national women's teams compete at chess for gold, silver and bronze medals. Since 1976 the Women's Chess Olympiad has been incorporated within Chess Olympiad events, with simultaneous women's and open tournaments.

The trophy for the winning women's team is known as the Vera Menchik Cup in honor of the first Women's World Chess Champion (1927–1944). The Soviet Union has won it the most often: 11 times. Before the break-up of the Soviet Union, it has also been won by Hungary led by three Polgár sisters (twice) and Israeli team fully composed of Soviet-born players (once in 1976 when it was boycotted by the Eastern Bloc). In the post-Soviet era, China have won the event seven times, Georgia – four times, Russia – three times, Ukraine – two times and India – once.

== Format ==
The women's Olympiad consisted of teams of two in 1957; teams of two with one reserve from 1963 to 1974; and teams of three with one reserve from 1976 to 2006. Since 2008 it has had teams of four with one reserve, the same format as the open Olympiad.

== Results ==
From 1957 to 1974 the Women's Olympiad was a separate event (with except of the 1972 event). Since 1976 it has been held in the same place and at the same time as the open event.

| Year | Event | Host | Gold | Silver | Bronze |
|---|---|---|---|---|---|
| 1957 | 1st Women's Chess Olympiad | Emmen, Netherlands | Soviet Union 10½; Olga Rubtsova; Kira Zvorykina | Romania 10½; Maria Pogorevici; Margareta Teodorescu | East Germany 10; Edith Keller-Herrmann; Ursula Altrichter |
| 1963 | 2nd Women's Chess Olympiad | Split, then part of Yugoslavia | Soviet Union 25; Nona Gaprindashvili; Tatiana Zatulovskaya; Kira Zvorykina | Yugoslavia 24½; Milunka Lazarević; Verica Nedeljković; Katarina Jovanović-Blagojević | East Germany 21; Edith Keller-Herrmann; Waltraud Nowarra; Eveline Kraatz |
| 1966 | 3rd Women's Chess Olympiad | Oberhausen, then part of West Germany | Soviet Union 22; Nona Gaprindashvili; Valentina Kozlovskaya; Tatiana Zatulovskaya | Romania 20½; Alexandra Nicolau; Elisabeta Polihroniade; Margareta Perevoznic | East Germany 17; Edith Keller-Herrmann; Waltraud Nowarra; Gabriele Just |
| 1969 | 4th Women's Chess Olympiad | Lublin, Poland | Soviet Union 26; Nona Gaprindashvili; Alla Kushnir; Nana Alexandria | Hungary 20½; Mária Ivánka; Zsuzsa Verőci; Károlyné Honfi | Czechoslovakia 19; Štěpánka Vokřálová; Květa Eretová; Jana Malypetrová |
| 1972 | 20th Chess Olympiad | Skopje, then part of Yugoslavia | Soviet Union 11½; Nona Gaprindashvili; Alla Kushnir; Irina Levitina | Romania 8 Elisabeta Polihroniade; Gertrude Baumstark; Alexandra Nicolau | Hungary 8 Mária Ivánka; Zsuzsa Verőci; Gyuláné Krizsán-Bilek |
| 1974 | 6th Women's Chess Olympiad | Medellín, Colombia | Soviet Union 13½; Nona Gaprindashvili; Nana Alexandria; Irina Levitina | Romania 13½; Elisabeta Polihroniade; Gertrude Baumstark; Margareta Teodorescu | Bulgaria 13; Tatjana Lematschko; Antonina Georgieva; Venka Asenova |
| 1976 | 22nd Chess Olympiad * | Haifa, Israel | Israel 17; Alla Kushnir; Ljuba Kristol; Olga Podrazhanskaya; Lea Nudelman | England 11½; Jana Hartston; Sheila Jackson; Elaine Pritchard; Susan Caldwell | Spain 11½; Pepita Ferrer Lucas; Nieves García Vicente; María del Pino García Padrón; Teresa Canela Giménez |
| 1978 | 23rd Chess Olympiad | Buenos Aires, Argentina | Soviet Union 16; Maia Chiburdanidze; Nona Gaprindashvili; Nana Alexandria; Elena Akhmilovskaya | Hungary 11; Zsuzsa Verőci-Petronić; Mária Ivánka; Zsuzsa Makai; Rita Kas | West Germany 11; Anni Laakmann; Gisela Fischdick; Barbara Hund; Hannelore Weichert |
| 1980 | 24th Chess Olympiad | Valletta, Malta | Soviet Union 32½; Maia Chiburdanidze; Nona Gaprindashvili; Nana Alexandria; Nana Ioseliani | Hungary 32; Zsuzsa Verőci-Petronić; Mária Ivánka; Mária Porubszky-Angyalosine; Tünde Csonkics | Poland 26½; Hanna Ereńska-Radzewska; Grażyna Szmacińska; Małgorzata Wiese; Agnieszka Brustman |
| 1982 | 25th Chess Olympiad | Lucerne, Switzerland | Soviet Union 33; Maia Chiburdanidze; Nana Alexandria; Nona Gaprindashvili; Nana Ioseliani | Romania 30; Margareta Mureșan; Marina Pogorevici; Daniela Nuţu-Terescenko; Elisabeta Polihroniade | Hungary 26; Zsuzsa Verőci-Petronić; Mária Ivánka; Mária Porubszky-Angyalosine; Tünde Csonkics |
| 1984 | 26th Chess Olympiad | Thessaloniki, Greece | Soviet Union 32; Maia Chiburdanidze; Irina Levitina; Nona Gaprindashvili; Lidia Semenova | Bulgaria 27½; Margarita Voyska; Rumiana Gocheva; Pavlina Chilingirova; Stefka Savova | Romania 27; Margareta Mureșan; Elisabeta Polihroniade; Daniela Nuţu; Gabriela Olărașu |
| 1986 | 27th Chess Olympiad | Dubai, United Arab Emirates | Soviet Union 33½; Maia Chiburdanidze; Elena Akhmilovskaya; Nona Gaprindashvili; Nana Alexandria | Hungary 29; Zsuzsa Verőci-Petronić; Ildikó Mádl; Mária Ivánka; Mária Grosch | Romania 28; Margareta Mureșan; Daniela Nuţu; Elisabeta Polihroniade; Gabriela Olărașu |
| 1988 | 28th Chess Olympiad | Thessaloniki, Greece | Hungary 33; Zsuzsa Polgár; Judit Polgár; Ildikó Mádl; Zsófia Polgár | Soviet Union 32½; Maia Chiburdanidze; Elena Akhmilovskaya; Irina Levitina; Marta Litinskaya | Yugoslavia 28; Alisa Marić; Gordana Marković; Suzana Maksimović; Vesna Bašagić |
| 1990 | 29th Chess Olympiad | Novi Sad, then part of Yugoslavia | Hungary 35; Zsuzsa Polgár; Judit Polgár; Zsófia Polgár; Ildikó Mádl | Soviet Union 35; Maia Chiburdanidze; Nona Gaprindashvili; Alisa Galliamova; Ketevan Arakhamia | China 29; Xie Jun; Peng Zhaoqin; Qin Kanying; Wang Lei |
| 1992 | 30th Chess Olympiad | Manila, Philippines | Georgia 30½; Maia Chiburdanidze; Nona Gaprindashvili; Nana Ioseliani; Nino Gurieli | Ukraine 29; Alisa Galliamova-Ivanchuk; Marta Litinskaya; Irina Chelushkina; Lidia Semenova | China 28½; Xie Jun; Peng Zhaoqin; Wang Pin; Qin Kanying |
| 1994 | 31st Chess Olympiad | Moscow, Russia | Georgia 32; Maia Chiburdanidze; Nana Ioseliani; Ketevan Arakhamia; Nino Gurieli | Hungary 31; Zsuzsa Polgár; Zsófia Polgár; Ildikó Mádl; Tünde Csonkics | China 27; Xie Jun; Peng Zhaoqin; Qin Kanying; Zhu Chen |
| 1996 | 32nd Chess Olympiad | Yerevan, Armenia | Georgia 30; Maia Chiburdanidze; Nana Ioseliani; Ketevan Arakhamia-Grant; Nino Gurieli | China 28½; Xie Jun; Zhu Chen; Wang Lei; Wang Pin | Russia 28½; Alisa Galliamova; Svetlana Matveeva; Svetlana Prudnikova; Ludmila Zaitseva |
| 1998 | 33rd Chess Olympiad | Elista, Russia | China 29; Xie Jun; Zhu Chen; Wang Pin; Wang Lei | Russia 27; Svetlana Matveeva; Ekaterina Kovalevskaya; Tatiana Shumiakina; Tatiana Stepovaya-Dianchenko | Georgia 27; Maia Chiburdanidze; Nana Ioseliani; Ketevan Arakhamia-Grant; Nino Khurtsidze |
| 2000 | 34th Chess Olympiad | Istanbul, Turkey | China 32; Xie Jun; Zhu Chen; Xu Yuhua; Wang Lei | Georgia 31; Maia Chiburdanidze; Nana Ioseliani; Nino Khurtsidze; Nino Gurieli | Russia 28½; Alisa Galliamova; Ekaterina Kovalevskaya; Svetlana Matveeva; Tatiana Stepovaya-Dianchenko |
| 2002 | 35th Chess Olympiad | Bled, Slovenia | China 29½; Zhu Chen; Xu Yuhua; Wang Pin; Zhao Xue | Russia 29; Ekaterina Kovalevskaya; Svetlana Matveeva; Alexandra Kosteniuk; Tatiana Kosintseva | Poland 28; Iweta Radziewicz; Joanna Dworakowska; Monika Soćko; Beata Kądziołka |
| 2004 | 36th Chess Olympiad | Calvià, Spain | China 31; Xie Jun; Xu Yuhua; Zhao Xue; Huang Qian | United States 28; Susan Polgar; Irina Krush; Anna Zatonskih; Jennifer Shahade | Russia 27½; Alexandra Kosteniuk; Tatiana Kosintseva; Ekaterina Kovalevskaya; Nadezhda Kosintseva |
| 2006 | 37th Chess Olympiad | Turin, Italy | Ukraine 29½; Natalia Zhukova; Kateryna Lahno; Inna Gaponenko; Anna Ushenina | Russia 28; Alexandra Kosteniuk; Tatiana Kosintseva; Nadezhda Kosintseva; Ekaterina Kovalevskaya | China 27½; Zhao Xue; Wang Yu; Shen Yang; Hou Yifan |
| 2008 | 38th Chess Olympiad | Dresden, Germany | Georgia 18; Maia Chiburdanidze; Nana Dzagnidze; Lela Javakhishvili; Maia Lomineishvili; Sopiko Khukhashvili | Ukraine 18; Kateryna Lahno; Natalia Zhukova; Anna Ushenina; Inna Gaponenko; Natalia Zdebskaya | United States 17; Irina Krush; Anna Zatonskih; Rusudan Goletiani; Katerina Rohonyan; Tatev Abrahamyan |
| 2010 | 39th Chess Olympiad | Khanty-Mansiysk, Russia | Russia 22; Tatiana Kosintseva; Nadezhda Kosintseva; Alexandra Kosteniuk; Alisa Galliamova; Valentina Gunina | China 18; Hou Yifan; Ju Wenjun; Zhao Xue; Huang Qian; Wang Yu | Georgia 16; Nana Dzagnidze; Lela Javakhishvili; Salome Melia; Sopiko Khukhashvili; Bela Khotenashvili |
| 2012 | 40th Chess Olympiad | Istanbul, Turkey | Russia 19; Tatiana Kosintseva; Valentina Gunina; Nadezhda Kosintseva; Alexandra Kosteniuk; Natalia Pogonina | China 19; Hou Yifan; Zhao Xue; Ju Wenjun; Huang Qian; Ding Yixin | Ukraine 18; Kateryna Lahno; Mariya Muzychuk; Natalia Zhukova; Anna Ushenina; Inna Gaponenko |
| 2014 | 41st Chess Olympiad | Tromsø, Norway | Russia 20; Kateryna Lagno; Valentina Gunina; Alexandra Kosteniuk; Olga Girya; Natalia Pogonina | China 18; Hou Yifan; Ju Wenjun; Zhao Xue; Tan Zhongyi; Guo Qi | Ukraine 18; Anna Muzychuk; Mariya Muzychuk; Anna Ushenina; Natalia Zhukova; Inna Gaponenko |
| 2016 | 42nd Chess Olympiad | Baku, Azerbaijan | China 20; Hou Yifan; Ju Wenjun; Zhao Xue; Tan Zhongyi; Guo Qi | Poland 17; Monika Soćko; Jolanta Zawadzka; Karina Szczepkowska-Horowska; Klaudia Kulon; Mariola Woźniak | Ukraine 17; Anna Muzychuk; Mariya Muzychuk; Natalia Zhukova; Anna Ushenina; Inna Gaponenko |
| 2018 | 43rd Chess Olympiad | Batumi, Georgia | China 18; Ju Wenjun; Shen Yang; Huang Qian; Lei Tingjie; Zhai Mo | Ukraine 18; Anna Muzychuk; Mariya Muzychuk; Anna Ushenina; Natalia Zhukova; Yuliia Osmak | Georgia 17; Nana Dzagnidze; Lela Javakhishvili; Nino Batsiashvili; Bela Khotenashvili; Meri Arabidze |
| 2022 | 44th Chess Olympiad | Chennai, India | Ukraine 18; Mariya Muzychuk; Anna Muzychuk; Anna Ushenina; Nataliya Buksa; Yuliia Osmak | Georgia 18; Nana Dzagnidze; Nino Batsiashvili; Lela Javakhishvili; Salome Melia; Meri Arabidze | India 17; Koneru Humpy; Harika Dronavalli; Rameshbabu Vaishali; Tania Sachdev; Bhakti Kulkarni |
| 2024 | 45th Chess Olympiad | Budapest, Hungary | India 19; Harika Dronavalli; Rameshbabu Vaishali; Divya Deshmukh; Vantika Agrawal; Tania Sachdev | Kazakhstan 18; Bibisara Assaubayeva; Meruert Kamalidenova; Xeniya Balabayeva; Alua Nurman; Amina Kairbekova | United States 17; Gulrukhbegim Tokhirjonova; Carissa Yip; Irina Krush; Alice Lee; Anna Zatonskih |
| 2026 | 46th Chess Olympiad | Samarkand, Uzbekistan | China 20; Zhu Jiner; Song Yuxin; Lu Miaoyi; Yan Tianqi; Zhai Mo | Kazakhstan 18; Bibisara Assaubayeva; Alua Nurman; Meruert Kamalidenova; Elnaz Kaliakhmet; Zarina Nurgaliyeva | India 17; Koneru Humpy; Rameshbabu Vaishali; Divya Deshmukh; Vantika Agrawal; Savitha Shri Baskar |
| 2028 | 47th Chess Olympiad | Abu Dhabi, United Arab Emirates | | | |

* In 1976 the Soviet Union and other Socialist states did not compete for political reasons.

== Gaprindashvili Cup ==
This trophy was created by FIDE in 1997 and named after Nona Gaprindashvili, the former women's World Champion (1962–1978). The trophy is awarded to the team that has the best overall performance across the open and women's divisions.

Russia has won this trophy six times, China and India – three times each, and Ukraine – two times.

| Year | First | Second | Third |
|---|---|---|---|
| 1998 | Russia | China | Georgia |
| 2000 | Russia | Ukraine | Georgia |
| 2002 | Russia | China | Hungary |
| 2004 | Russia | United States | Armenia |
| 2006 | China | Ukraine | Armenia |
| 2008 | Ukraine | Armenia | United States |
| 2010 | Russia | China | Ukraine |
| 2012 | Russia | China | Ukraine |
| 2014 | China | Russia | Ukraine |
| 2016 | Ukraine | United States | China |
| 2018 | China | Russia | Ukraine |
| 2022 | India | United States | India 2 |
| 2024 | India | United States | Armenia |
| 2026 | India | United States | China |

== Medal tables ==
=== Women's event ===
The table contains the women's teams ranked by the medals won at the Chess Olympiad, not including the unofficial events, ranked by the number of first place medals, ties broken by second-place medals, etc.

| Rank | Nation | Gold | Silver | Bronze | Total |
|---|---|---|---|---|---|
| 1 | Soviet Union | 11 | 2 | 0 | 13 |
| 2 | China | 7 | 4 | 4 | 15 |
| 3 | Georgia | 4 | 2 | 3 | 9 |
| 4 | Russia | 3 | 3 | 3 | 9 |
| 5 | Hungary | 2 | 5 | 2 | 9 |
| 6 | Ukraine | 2 | 3 | 3 | 8 |
| 7 | India | 1 | 0 | 2 | 3 |
| 8 | Israel | 1 | 0 | 0 | 1 |
| 9 | Romania | 0 | 5 | 2 | 7 |
| 10 | Kazakhstan | 0 | 2 | 0 | 2 |
| 11 | Poland | 0 | 1 | 2 | 3 |
| 11 | United States | 0 | 1 | 2 | 3 |
| 13 | Bulgaria | 0 | 1 | 1 | 2 |
| 13 | Yugoslavia | 0 | 1 | 1 | 2 |
| 15 | England | 0 | 1 | 0 | 1 |
| 16 | East Germany | 0 | 0 | 3 | 3 |
| 17 | Czechoslovakia | 0 | 0 | 1 | 1 |
| 17 | Spain | 0 | 0 | 1 | 1 |
| 17 | West Germany | 0 | 0 | 1 | 1 |
| Totals (19 entries) | | 31 | 31 | 31 | 93 |

=== Open and Women's events ===
The table contains teams ranked by total number of medals won at the Chess Olympiad (not including the online or unofficial events) in the Open event (since 1927) and Women's event (since 1957), ranked by the number of first-place medals, ties broken by second-place medals, etc.

| Rank | Nation | Gold | Silver | Bronze | Total |
|---|---|---|---|---|---|
| 1 | Soviet Union | 29 | 3 | 0 | 32 |
| 2 | Russia | 9 | 6 | 6 | 21 |
| 3 | China | 9 | 5 | 4 | 18 |
| 4 | United States | 6 | 8 | 10 | 24 |
| 5 | Hungary | 5 | 12 | 4 | 21 |
| 6 | Ukraine | 4 | 5 | 6 | 15 |
| 7 | Georgia | 4 | 2 | 3 | 9 |
| 8 | Armenia | 3 | 1 | 3 | 7 |
| 9 | India | 2 | 1 | 4 | 7 |
| 10 | Uzbekistan | 2 | 1 | 1 | 4 |
| 11 | Yugoslavia | 1 | 7 | 7 | 15 |
| 12 | Poland | 1 | 3 | 5 | 9 |
| 13 | Germany | 1 | 1 | 2 | 4 |
| 14 | Israel | 1 | 1 | 1 | 3 |
| 15 | Romania | 0 | 5 | 2 | 7 |
| 16 | England | 0 | 4 | 3 | 7 |
| 17 | Argentina | 0 | 3 | 2 | 5 |
| 18 | Czechoslovakia | 0 | 2 | 2 | 4 |
| 19 | Kazakhstan | 0 | 2 | 0 | 2 |
| 20 | Bulgaria | 0 | 1 | 2 | 3 |
| 21 | Netherlands | 0 | 1 | 1 | 2 |
| 21 | Sweden | 0 | 1 | 1 | 2 |
| 23 | Bosnia and Herzegovina | 0 | 1 | 0 | 1 |
| 23 | Denmark | 0 | 1 | 0 | 1 |
| 25 | East Germany | 0 | 0 | 3 | 3 |
| 25 | West Germany | 0 | 0 | 3 | 3 |
| 27 | Estonia | 0 | 0 | 1 | 1 |
| 27 | Spain | 0 | 0 | 1 | 1 |
| Totals (28 entries) | | 77 | 77 | 77 | 231 |

== Most successful players ==
Boldface denotes active chess players and highest medal count among all players (including these who not included in these tables) per type.

=== Multiple team champions ===
| Rank | Player | Country | From | To | Gold | Silver | Bronze | Total |
|---|---|---|---|---|---|---|---|---|
| 1 | Nona Gaprindashvili | Soviet Union; Georgia | 1963 | 1992 | **11** | 1 | – | 12 |
| 2 | Maia Chiburdanidze | Soviet Union; Georgia | 1978 | 2008 | 9 | 3 | 1 | **13** |
| 3 | Nana Alexandria | Soviet Union | 1969 | 1986 | 6 | – | – | 6 |
| 4 | Nana Ioseliani | Soviet Union; Georgia | 1980 | 2000 | 5 | 1 | 1 | 7 |
| 5 | **Zhao Xue** | China | 2002 | 2016 | 3 | 3 | 1 | 7 |
| 6 | **Alexandra Kosteniuk** | Russia | 2002 | 2014 | 3 | 2 | 1 | 6 |
| 7 | Xie Jun | China | 1990 | 2004 | 3 | 1 | **3** | 7 |
| 8 | **Zhu Chen** | China | 1994 | 2002 | 3 | 1 | 1 | 5 |
| 9 | Nino Gurieli | Georgia | 1992 | 2000 | 3 | 1 | – | 4 |
| 9 | Irina Levitina | Soviet Union | 1972 | 1988 | 3 | 1 | – | 4 |

=== Multiple team medalists ===
The table shows players who have won at least 6 team medals in total at the Chess Olympiads.

| Rank | Player | Country | From | To | Gold | Silver | Bronze | Total |
|---|---|---|---|---|---|---|---|---|
| 1 | Maia Chiburdanidze | Soviet Union; Georgia | 1978 | 2008 | 9 | 3 | 1 | **13** |
| 2 | Nona Gaprindashvili | Soviet Union; Georgia | 1963 | 1992 | **11** | 1 | – | 12 |
| 3 | Nana Ioseliani | Soviet Union; Georgia | 1980 | 2000 | 5 | 1 | 1 | 7 |
| 4 | **Zhao Xue** | China | 2002 | 2016 | 3 | 3 | 1 | 7 |
| 5 | Xie Jun | China | 1990 | 2004 | 3 | 1 | **3** | 7 |
| 6 | **Anna Ushenina** | Ukraine | 2006 | 2022 | 2 | 2 | **3** | 7 |
| 7 | Nana Alexandria | Soviet Union | 1969 | 1986 | 6 | – | – | 6 |
| 8 | **Alexandra Kosteniuk** | Russia | 2002 | 2014 | 3 | 2 | 1 | 6 |
| 9 | **Natalia Zhukova** | Ukraine | 2006 | 2018 | 1 | 2 | **3** | 6 |
| 10 | Mária Ivánka | Hungary | 1969 | 1986 | – | **4** | 2 | 6 |
| 10 | Elisabeta Polihroniade | Romania | 1966 | 1986 | – | **4** | 2 | 6 |
| 10 | Zsuzsa Verőci-Petronić | Hungary | 1969 | 1986 | – | **4** | 2 | 6 |

== Best individual results in the women's section ==
The best individual results in order of overall percentage are:

| Rank | Player | Country | Ol. | Gms. | + | = | – | % | Individual medals | Number of ind. medals | Team medals | Number of team medals |
|---|---|---|---|---|---|---|---|---|---|---|---|---|
| 1 | Nona Gaprindashvili | Soviet Union (11); Georgia (1) | 12 | 128 | 94 | 26 | 8 | 83.6 | 8 – 3 – 0 | 11 | 11 – 1 – 0 | 12 |
| 2 | Nadezhda Kosintseva | Russia | 5 | 51 | 36 | 13 | 2 | 83.3 | 4 – 0 – 0 | 4 | 2 – 1 – 1 | 4 |
| 3 | Pia Cramling | Sweden | 10 | 118 | 79 | 35 | 4 | 81.8 | 3 – 2 – 2 | 7 | 0 – 0 – 0 | 0 |
| 4 | Zsófia Polgár | Hungary | 4 | 48 | 32 | 13 | 3 | 80.2 | 2 – 0 – 1 | 3 | 2 – 1 – 0 | 3 |
| 5 | Wang Lei | China | 4 | 32 | 21 | 8 | 3 | 78.1 | 1 – 0 – 0 | 1 | 2 – 1 – 1 | 4 |
| 6 | Zsuzsa (Susan) Polgár | Hungary (3); United States (1) | 4 | 56 | 31 | 25 | 0 | 77.7 | 1 – 2 – 1 | 4 | 2 – 2 – 0 | 4 |
| 7 | Ketevan Arakhamia-Grant | Soviet Union (1); Georgia (4); Scotland (4) | 9 | 95 | 62 | 23 | 10 | 77.4 | 2 – 0 – 1 | 3 | 2 – 1 – 1 | 4 |
| 8 | Valentina Gunina | Russia | 5 | 46 | 27 | 16 | 3 | 76.1 | 2 – 0 – 0 | 2 | 3 – 0 – 0 | 3 |
| 9 | Nana Alexandria | Soviet Union | 6 | 54 | 35 | 12 | 7 | 75.9 | 4 – 0 – 0 | 4 | 6 – 0 – 0 | 6 |
| 10 | Alisa Galliamova (Galliamova-Ivanchuk) | Soviet Union (1); Ukraine (1); Russia (3) | 5 | 57 | 39 | 8 | 10 | 75.4 | 0 – 2 – 0 | 2 | 1 – 2 – 2 | 5 |
| 11 | Zhao Xue | China | 8 | 81 | 49 | 24 | 8 | 75.3 | 3 – 0 – 0 | 3 | 3 – 3 – 1 | 7 |
| 12 | Maia Chiburdanidze | Soviet Union (7); Georgia (8) | 15 | 167 | 89 | 73 | 5 | 75.1 | 4 – 2 – 3 | 9 | 9 – 3 – 1 | 13 |
| 13 | Iman Hasan Al-Rufaye | Iraq | 5 | 48 | 31 | 10 | 7 | 75.0 | 1 – 2 – 0 | 3 | 0 – 0 – 0 | 0 |
| 14 | Hou Yifan | China | 6 | 61 | 34 | 23 | 4 | 74.6 | 1 – 3 – 2 | 6 | 1 – 3 – 1 | 5 |
| 15 | Nino Batsiashvili | Georgia | 6 | 55 | 33 | 16 | 6 | 74.5 | 1 – 1 – 0 | 2 | 0 – 1 – 1 | 2 |
| 16 | Sarasadat Khademalsharieh | Iran (4); Spain (1) | 5 | 49 | 28 | 17 | 4 | 74.5 | 0 – 1 – 0 | 1 | 0 – 0 – 0 | 0 |
| 17 | Nana Ioseliani | Soviet Union (2); Georgia (6) | 8 | 88 | 49 | 32 | 7 | 73.9 | 2 – 2 – 1 | 5 | 5 – 1 – 1 | 7 |
| 18 | Zhu Chen | China | 5 | 59 | 34 | 19 | 6 | 73.7 | 2 – 1 – 0 | 3 | 3 – 1 – 1 | 5 |
| 19 | Zsuzsa Verőci-Petronić | Hungary | 10 | 118 | 62 | 48 | 8 | 72.9 | 0 – 3 – 2 | 5 | 0 – 4 – 2 | 6 |
| 20 | Edith Keller-Herrmann | East Germany | 4 | 49 | 26 | 19 | 4 | 72.4 | 0 – 1 – 1 | 2 | 0 – 0 – 3 | 3 |

Notes

- Only players participating in at least four Olympiads are included in this table.
- Medals indicated in the order gold - silver - bronze. The statistics of individual medals includes only medals which are awarding to the top three individual players on each board. The medals for overall performance rating (awarded in 1984–2006) are not included into this statistics, but are listed separately below the table.
- Nona Gaprindashvili played eleven Olympiads for the Soviet Union, and one for Georgia. She won another one individual gold medal and one individual bronze medal for overall performance rating. In total she won 9 gold, 3 silver and 1 bronze individual medals.
- Pia Cramling won another one individual silver medal and one individual bronze medal for overall performance rating. In total she won 3 gold, 3 silver and 3 bronze individual medals.
- Zsófia Polgár won another one individual gold medal for overall performance rating. In total she won 3 gold and 1 bronze individual medals.
- Wang Lei won another one individual gold medal for overall performance rating. In total she won 2 individual gold medals.
- Zsuzsa Polgár played three Olympiads for Hungary, and one for the United States (as Susan Polgar). She won another one individual gold medal and two individual bronze medals for overall performance rating. In total she won 2 gold, 2 silver and 3 bronze individual medals.
- Ketevan Arakhamia-Grant played her first Olympiad for the Soviet Union, then four for Georgia and four for Scotland. She won another one individual gold medal and one individual bronze medal for overall performance rating. In total she won 3 gold and 2 bronze individual medals.
- Alisa Galliamova played her first Olympiad for the Soviet Union, then one for Ukraine (as Galliamova-Ivanchuk) and three for Russia. She won another two individual silver medals for overall performance rating. In total she won 4 individual silver medals.
- Zhao Xue won another two individual gold medals and one individual bronze medal for overall performance rating. In total she won 5 gold and 1 bronze individual medals.
- Maia Chiburdanidze played her first seven Olympiads for the Soviet Union, the rest for Georgia. She won another one individual gold medal and three individual bronze medals for overall performance rating. In total she won 5 gold, 2 silver and 6 bronze individual medals.
- Hou Yifan won another one individual bronze medal for overall performance rating. In total she won 1 gold, 3 silver and 3 bronze individual medals.
- Sarasadat Khademalsharieh played four Olympiads for Iran, and one for Spain.
- Nana Ioseliani played her first two Olympiads for the Soviet Union, the rest for Georgia. She won another one individual silver medal and one individual bronze medal for overall performance rating. In total she won 2 gold, 3 silver and 2 bronze individual medals.
- Zhu Chen won another two individual gold medals for overall performance rating. In total she won 4 gold and 1 silver individual medals.

== See also ==
- Chess Olympiad
- Correspondence Chess Olympiad
- European Chess Club Cup
- European Team Chess Championship
- Mind Sports Organisation
- Russia (USSR) vs Rest of the World
- Women's World Chess Championship
- World Chess Championship
- World Mind Sports Games
- World Team Chess Championship
