= Irina Zakurdjaeva =

Russian chess player (born 1982)

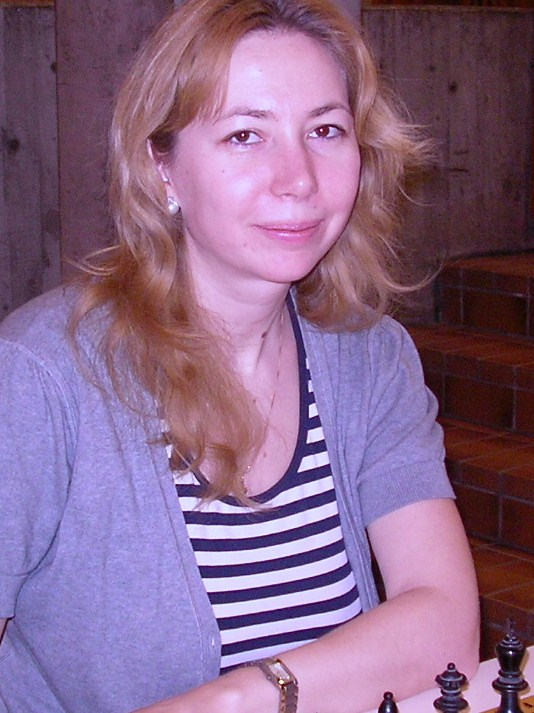
- Zakurdjaeva in 2012

Personal information
- Full name: Irina Vyacheslavovna Zakurdjaeva
- Born: November 30, 1982 (age 43) Moscow, Soviet Union

Chess career
- Country: Russia
- Title: Woman Grandmaster (2003)
- Peak rating: 2332 (January 2008)

Irina Vyacheslavovna Zakurdjaeva (Russian: Ирина Вячеславовна Закурдяева; born 30 November 1982) is a Russian chess player who holds the title of Woman Grandmaster.

== Biography ==
From 1997 to 2002 Irina Zakurdjaeva played for Russia at the European Youth Chess Championship and at the World Youth Chess Championship in different age groups, where the best result was shown in 2001 in Rio, when she won the bronze medal at the European Girl's Chess Championship in the age group U20. In 1999, in Russian Junior Chess Championship Irina Zakurdjaeva shared the first place with Tatiana Kosintseva, Ekaterina Polovnikova and Nadezhda Kosintseva in the age group U18. In 2000, she won this age group Russian Junior Chess Championship ahead of Nadezhda Kosintseva and Olga Zimina, but in 2001 she was second in Russian Junior Chess Championship in the age group U20.

In 2007, Irina Zakurdjaeva shared the second place in the Open chess tournament in Istanbul (won Mikhail Gurevich) and ranked 10th in Women's European Individual Chess Championship in Dresden and qualified for the Women's World Chess Championship. In 2008, in Nalchik she participated in the Women's World Chess Championship 2008, where in the first round lost Ruan Lufei.

In 2009, Irina Zakurdjaeva took the fourth place in the women's grandmaster Round-robin tournament in San Sebastián (won Sophie Milliet). In 2010, she won silver medal at the Moscow Women's Chess Championship (won Nazí Paikidze) and shared the 1st place in the women's international chess tournament in Erfurt.

In 2001, she was awarded the FIDE Woman International Master (WIM) title and received the FIDE Woman Grandmaster (WGM) title two years later.
