= Golubenko =

Golubenko (Russian) or Holubenko (Ukrainian, Cyrillic: Голубенко) may refer to:

- Aleksey Golubenko, Soviet war hero
- Valentina Golubenko (born 1990), Russian-born chess player
