= Anna Jakubowska (chess player) =

Polish chess player

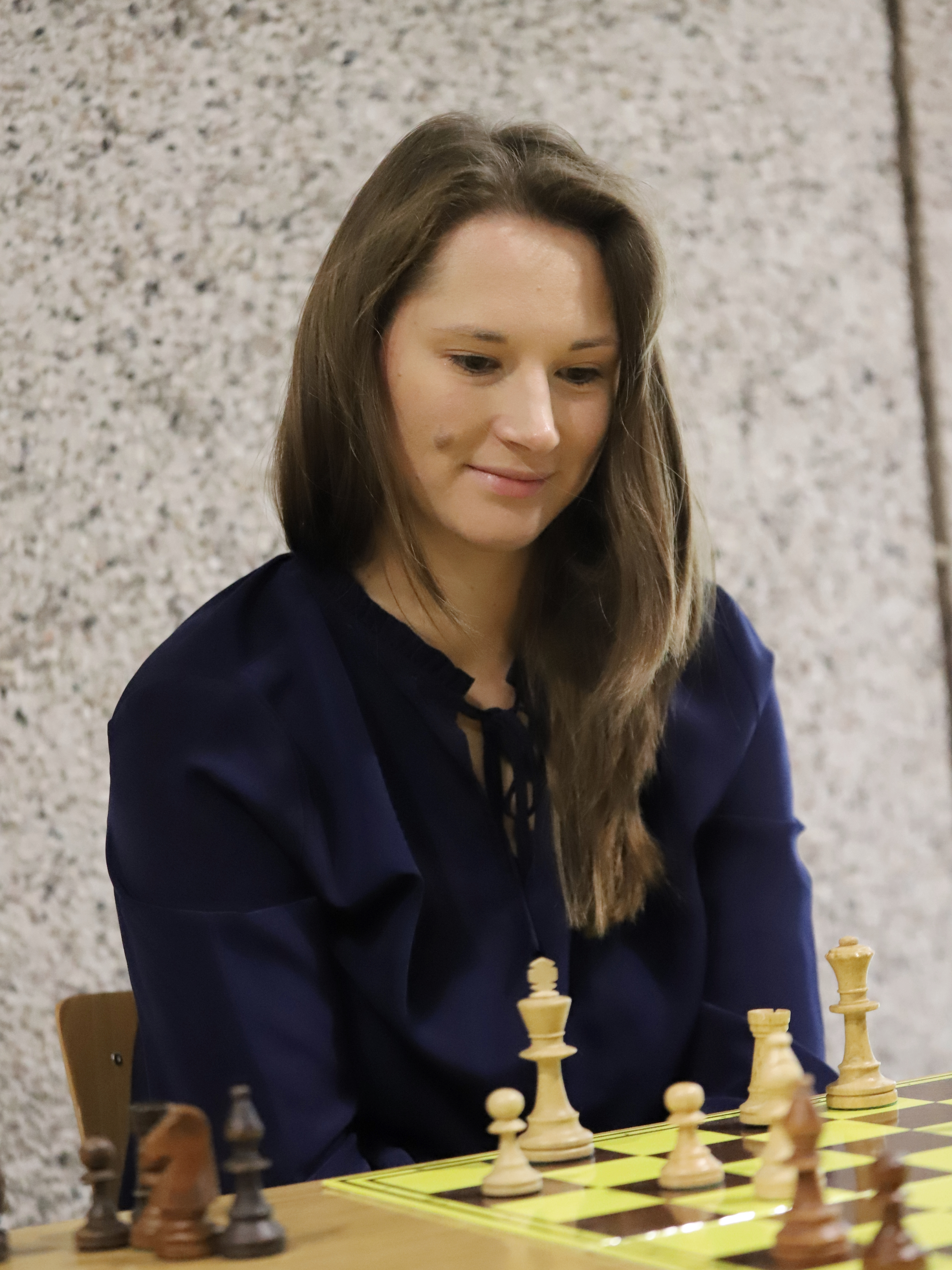
- Polish Chess Cup, Bydgoszcz 2021

Personal information
- Born: 21 August 1988 (age 37) Warsaw, Poland

Chess career
- Country: Poland
- Title: Woman International Master (2010)
- FIDE rating: 2139 (September 2022)
- Peak rating: 2264 (May 2014)

Anna Jakubowska (née Gasik, born 21 August 1988) is a Polish chess player who holds the Woman International Master title. She won the 2006 European Youth Chess Championship in the under 18 years old girls category. The competition was held in the coastal town of Herceg Novi, Montenegro. In 2008, she participated in Women's World Chess Championship in Nalchik, where she lost in the second round with Lilit Mkrtchian. She represents two European Chess Clubs, Polish: Polonia Warsaw and German: Hamburger SK.

== Personal life ==
In 2016, she married Polish chess grandmaster Krzysztof Jakubowski.
