= Huang Qian =

Chinese chess player (born 1986)

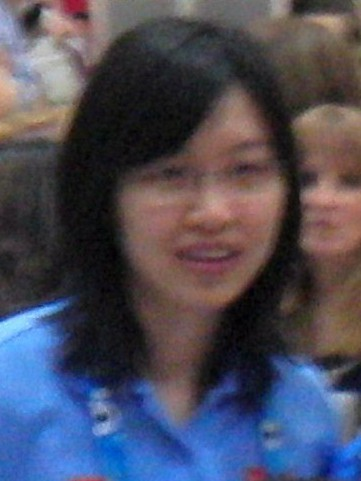
- Huang Qian, 2012 in Istanbul

Personal information
- Born: July 18, 1986 (age 39) Chongqing, China
- Spouse: Bu Xiangzhi (m. 2013)

Chess career
- Country: China
- Title: Woman Grandmaster (2008)
- Peak rating: 2494 (May 2014)

Huang Qian (Chinese: 黄茜; born July 18, 1986) is a Chinese chess player who holds the title of Woman Grandmaster (WGM). She won the Chinese Women's Chess Championship in 2012 and the Asian Women's Chess Championship in 2013. Huang competed in the Women's World Chess Championship in 2001, 2004, 2010, 2012, 2015 and 2017.

== Career ==
Huang was a member of the gold medal-winning Chinese team at the 2004 Women's Chess Olympiad in Calvià. In 2007, along with Zhao Xue, Hou Yifan, Ruan Lufei and Shen Yang, she also won with the Chinese team the first Women's World Team Chess Championship in Yekaterinburg. She scored of 4/4 (despite this 100% result she did not win reserve board prize due to the limited number of games played).

Huang was awarded the Woman Grandmaster title in March 2008. Her three norms required for the title were achieved at:

- 36th Chess Olympiad (Women) in Calvià, Spain October 14–31, 2004; score 7.5/10
- China Women's Individual Championship Group A in Chongqing, China June 6–19, 2007; score 6.5/10
- 12th Asian Women Individual Championship in Tehran, Iran September 3–11, 2007; score 5.5/9

In 2013, she won the Zhonghai Huashan Cup for Women Stars, a rapidplay women's round-robin tournament held in Huayin, on tiebreak over Viktorija Cmilyte with a score of 4½/7, half point ahead of Tatiana Kosintseva and Women's World Champion Anna Ushenina. Huang Qian played in the Women World Rapid Championship in Riyadh 2017 and realised her best results with the black pieces (2 wins, 2 draws). In 2019, she won the Yinzhou Cup in Ningbo, China for women.

Huang Qian plays for China Mobile Group Chongqing Company Ltd chess club in the China Chess League (CCL).

== Personal life ==
Huang Qian is married to chess grandmaster Bu Xiangzhi.

Awards and achievements
| Preceded by Irine Kharisma Sukandar | Women's Asian Chess Champion; 2013 | Succeeded by Irine Kharisma Sukandar |
