= Katerina Rohonyan =

Ukrainian-American chess player

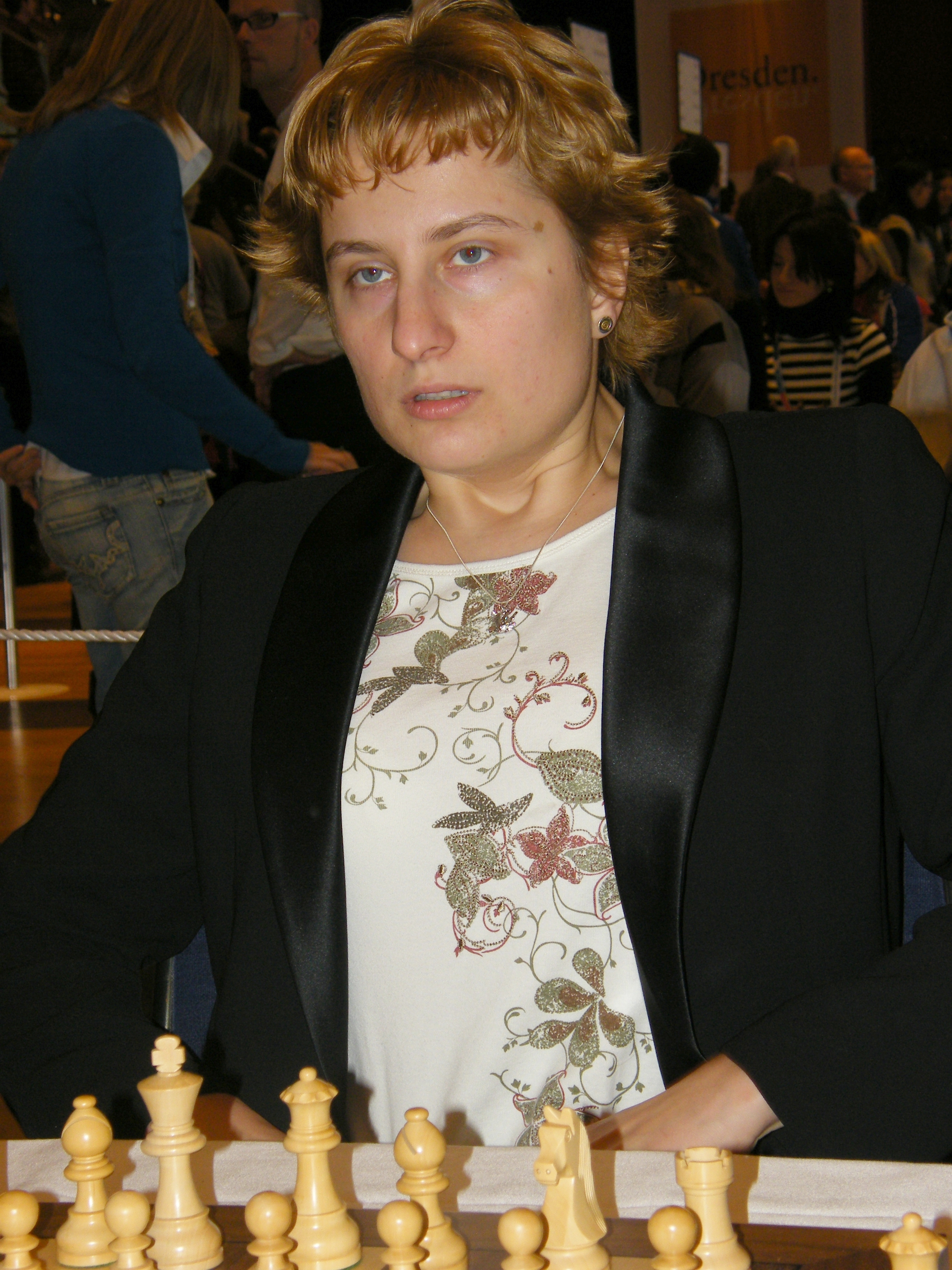
- Katerina Rohonyan in 2008

Personal information
- Born: 25 April 1984 (age 42) Mykolaiv, Ukrainian SSR, Soviet Union

Chess career
- Country: Ukraine (until 2006); United States (since 2006)
- Title: Woman Grandmaster (2004)
- Peak rating: 2377 (January 2004)

Katerina Serhiivna Rohonyan (Note: Ukrainian: Катерина Сергіївна Рогонян, romanized: Kateryna Serhiivna Rohonian) (born April 25, 1984) is a Ukrainian-American chess player holding the title of Woman Grandmaster (WGM).

She moved from Ukraine to United States in 2004. She has competed in several U.S. Women's Chess Championships.

Rohonyan won the Women's Ukrainian Chess Championship in 2000 in her hometown, Mykolaiv. She competed in the Women's World Chess Championship 2008 in Nalchik, Russia, where she defeated Natalia Zhukova in the first round to progress to the second, losing to Inna Gaponenko. In 2010, she tied for the first place in the Paul Keres Memorial Tournament in Vancouver, British Columbia, Canada.

Rohonyan played for the USA team that won the bronze medal at the Women's Chess Olympiad of 2008 in Dresden. She contributed to this result by scoring 6/10 points on board four. Rohonyan also played for the gold medal-winning Ukrainian team in the European Girls' Under-18 Team Chess Championships of 2000 and 2002.
