= Ruan Lufei =

Chinese chess player (born 1987)

Personal information
- Born: October 2, 1987 (age 38) Nanjing, Jiangsu, China

Chess career
- Country: China
- Title: Woman Grandmaster (2008)
- FIDE rating: 2491 (July 2026)
- Peak rating: 2503 (January 2014)

Ruan Lufei (Chinese: 阮露斐; born October 2, 1987) is a Chinese chess player holding the title of Woman Grandmaster (WGM) and Women's World Championship runner-up in 2010.

== Career ==
Ruan's natural talent for the game, hard work, and co-operation with her coach, Xu Jun, saw her break into the world's top 20 female chess players in January 2008. She had previously been in the FIDE Top 20 Girls List from 2004 to 2007, having reached a peak of 6th position on the October 2007 list.

Ruan was part of the Chinese women's team (with Zhao Xue, Hou Yifan, Shen Yang, Huang Qian) that won the First World Women's Team Chess Championship 2007 in Yekaterinburg. She had also won a silver medal (3rd board prize) with a score of 6/7.

In 2007, Ruan won second prize at the 12th Asian Women's Chess Championship.

During August and September 2008, at the Women's World Chess Championship she was knocked out in the third round 0.5-1.5 by Pia Cramling of Sweden.

In the 2008 World Mind Sports Games in Beijing, Ruan was part of the Chinese Women's team and won the gold medal, which was the second time she was on a team winning the World Team Championship.

In the 2010 Women's World Championship she reached the final, having won on tiebreaks in every round (eliminating previous champion Alexandra Kosteniuk in the process), and faced fellow Chinese Hou Yifan for the championship. Hou was firm favourite to win, especially since Ruan had an exhausting tournament, with all her matches going to the wire, while Hou had a comparatively easy ride to the final. In the 1st game of the 4 game final Ruan, having the black pieces, held Hou to a draw. However, when she lost the 2nd game with white, it seemed all over. Hou failed to deliver the knock out blow with the white pieces in round 3, though, which gave Ruan a window of opportunity in the 4th and final round of the classical games. Ruan, in a must win game, employed the Keres attack against the Sicilian defence, and in a very exciting game, recorded the win she needed for a spectacular come back, sending her into yet another set of tiebreak games. Having won all her previous tiebreaks, she was considered favourite to win by some commentators. As in the classical games, the 1st game was drawn, and Hou won the 2nd. Ruan drew the 3rd, ensuring the rapid tiebreaks go the distance, and was again in a must win situation, if she wanted the match to continue into the blitz tiebreaks. Unlike in the classical tiebreaks, however, she had the black pieces this time, and her much younger and better rested opponent, used the advantage of the white pieces to clinch the match and the title. Although Ruan finally ran out of gas, her run in the tournament showed what she's capable of, and her performance duly earned her a GM norm. In the final leg of the 2012 Women's Grand Prix she broke the 2500 rating barrier-a very rare achievement for female chess players. Ruan also made up her mind before the tournament that she would retire from chess after the event to focus on her academic career.

She plays for Jiangsu chess club in the China Chess League (CCL).

== WGM title ==
In 2007, she was awarded the Woman Grandmaster (WGM) title. She achieved her WGM norms at:

- 2004 China Women's Team Championship in Jinan, China (April 16–24, 2004); score 6.5/9
- China Zonal 3.5 Women's Championship in Beijing (October 20–25, 2005); score 5.0/9
- 8th Russian Women's Team Championship in Sochi, Russia (May 1–11, 2007); score 7.5/10

== Personal life ==
Ruan began studying at Tsinghua University in 2005, and is now a doctoral candidate in the field of Accounting at Tepper School of Business, Carnegie Mellon University in the United States.

Ruan Lufei's father, Ruan Miqing, is an associate professor at the Nanjing University of Aeronautics and Astronautics. He trained her from her childhood.

== See also ==
- Chess in China
