= Elena Sedina =

Ukrainian-Italian chess player (born 1968)

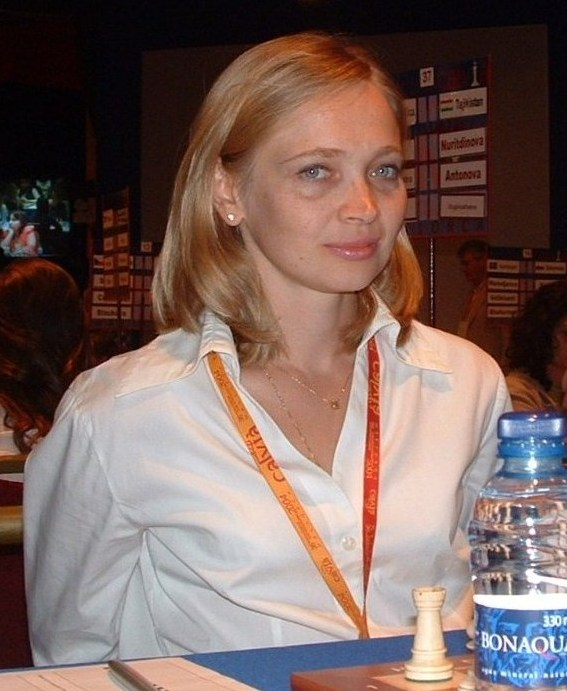
- Elena Sedina at the 36th Chess Olympiad in Calvià, Spain 2006

Personal information
- Born: 1 June 1968 (age 58) Kyiv, Ukrainian SSR, Soviet Union

Chess career
- Country: Ukraine (until 2001); Italy (since 2001)
- Title: International Master (1999); Woman Grandmaster (1996)
- Peak rating: 2434 (April 2003)

Elena Sedina (Russian: Елена Седина; Ukrainian: Оле́на Се́діна, Olena Sedina; born 1 June 1968 in Kyiv) is a Ukrainian-Italian chess player who holds the FIDE titles of International Master (IM) and Woman Grandmaster (WGM). She has won the Ukrainian Women's Chess Championship, the Australian Open Chess Championship, and is a Chess Olympiad and Mitropa Cup gold medalist.

== Chess career ==
Sedina learned to play chess at the age of seven and became women's champion of Kyiv at the age of eleven. At sixteen she won the Soviet Union Girls Under-18 Chess Championship in Chernihiv 1984.

Sedina won the Ukrainian Women's Chess Championship in 1988 and again in 1990.

She obtained the titles of Woman International Master (WIM) in 1990, Woman Grandmaster (WGM) in 1996 and International Master (IM) in 1999. She moved to Italy in 1995 and transferred to the Italian Chess Federation in April 2001.

Sedina represented Ukraine in four Women's Chess Olympiads from 1994 to 2000, and represented Italy, on board 1, from 2004 to 2012. Her best result was her Olympiad debut at the 31st Chess Olympiad in Moscow 1994, where she scored 10.5/12 and won the gold medal on first reserve board, and the silver medal for best rating performance. She also won the bronze medal on board 3 at the 32nd Chess Olympiad in Yerevan 1996.

Sedina competed in the Women's World Chess Championship 2001 where she was eliminated by former Women's World Chess Champion Maia Chiburdanidze in round two, the Women's World Chess Championship 2004 where she was eliminated by Elina Danielian in round one, and the Women's World Chess Championship 2008 where she made it to round three but was eliminated by eventual runner-up Hou Yifan in the rapid playoffs.

Along with Jana Krivec, she scored a perfect 7/7 in the 1997 Slovenian Women's Team Chess Championship, and was the top scorer with 8/9 in the 1999 Swiss Team Chess Championship. She won the San Martino di Castrozza Open in 2001, came second in the 2000 Swiss Women's Chess Championship and won the event in 2001, and finished equal first in the Genoa Centurini Open in 2004.

In January 2005 she scored 8.5/9 to win the Australian Open Chess Championship in Mount Buller, Victoria, becoming the first woman to ever do so.

In 2006, she scored 7.5/11 and finished equal third in the 7th European Women's Chess Championship in Kuşadası, Turkey. This qualified her to play in the Women's World Chess Championship 2008 in Nalchik, Russia where she defeated Irina Krush and Nguyen Thi Than An, before being eliminated by Hou Yifan in round 3.

In 2007, she won the bronze medal in the 5th Mediterranean Chess Championship in Sousse, Tunisia and in 2008/2009 the silver medal in the 6th Mediterranean Chess Championship in Antalya, Turkey.

Sedina has represented Italy in the Mitropa Cup eight times from 2008 to 2015. She has won two individual gold medals (in Olbia 2008 and Merlimont 2011), four team gold medals (in 2008, 2010, 2011 and 2014), one silver team medal (2015) and three bronze team medals (in 2009, 2012 and 2013) in the Mitropa Cup.

She has played in several national chess championship teams: in Germany with OSG Baden-Baden, with Mendrisio in Switzerland, in France with the Clichy-Echecs-92, in England with Wood Green 1.

== Personal life ==
Sedina graduated in Economics at the University of Kyiv in 1990. She also gained a PhD in chess training methods at the Kyiv Institute of Physical Culture and Sport in 1994.
