= Mária Porubszky-Angyalosiné =

Hungarian chess player

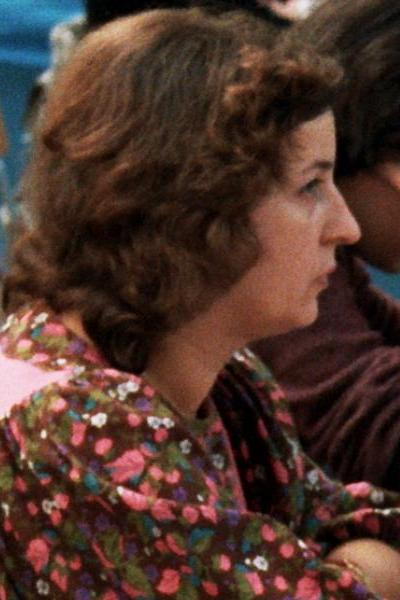
- Mária Porubszky-Angyalosiné in 1982

Personal information
- Born: 5 November 1945 (age 80)

Chess career
- Country: Hungary
- Title: Woman International Master (1971)
- Peak rating: 2240 (January 1987)

Mária Porubszky-Angyalosiné (born 5 November 1945) is a Hungarian chess player who holds the title of Woman International Master (WIM, 1971). She is a Hungarian Women's Chess Champion (1979).

== Biography ==
She achieved her first international success in 1970 when won third place in the International Women's Chess tournament in Balatonszéplak (Hungary) behind [Tatiana Zatulovskaya] and [Zsuzsa Verőci]. For this achievement, FIDE was awarded the title of Woman International Master (WIM) in 1971. She twice participated in the World Chess Women's Championship Zonal tournaments (1987, 1991). In 1991, she won the bronze medal in the Hungarian Women's Chess Championship. In 2007, in Keszthely she shared first place in the International Women's Chess tournament Keszthely Open.

Mária Porubszky-Angyalosiné played for Hungary in the Women's Chess Olympiads:

- In 1974, at first reserve board in the 6th Chess Olympiad (women) in Medellín (+2, =1, -1),
- In 1980, at third board in the 9th Chess Olympiad (women) in Valletta (+7, =2, -2) and won team and individual silver medals,
- In 1982, at third board in the 10th Chess Olympiad (women) in Lucerne (+8, =2, -2) and won team bronze medal.

Mária Porubszky-Angyalosiné played for Hungary "B" team in the European Team Chess Championships:

- In 1992, at first reserve board in the 1st European Team Chess Championship (women) in Debrecen (+0, =1, -2).
