= Zsuzsa Verőci =

Hungarian chess player

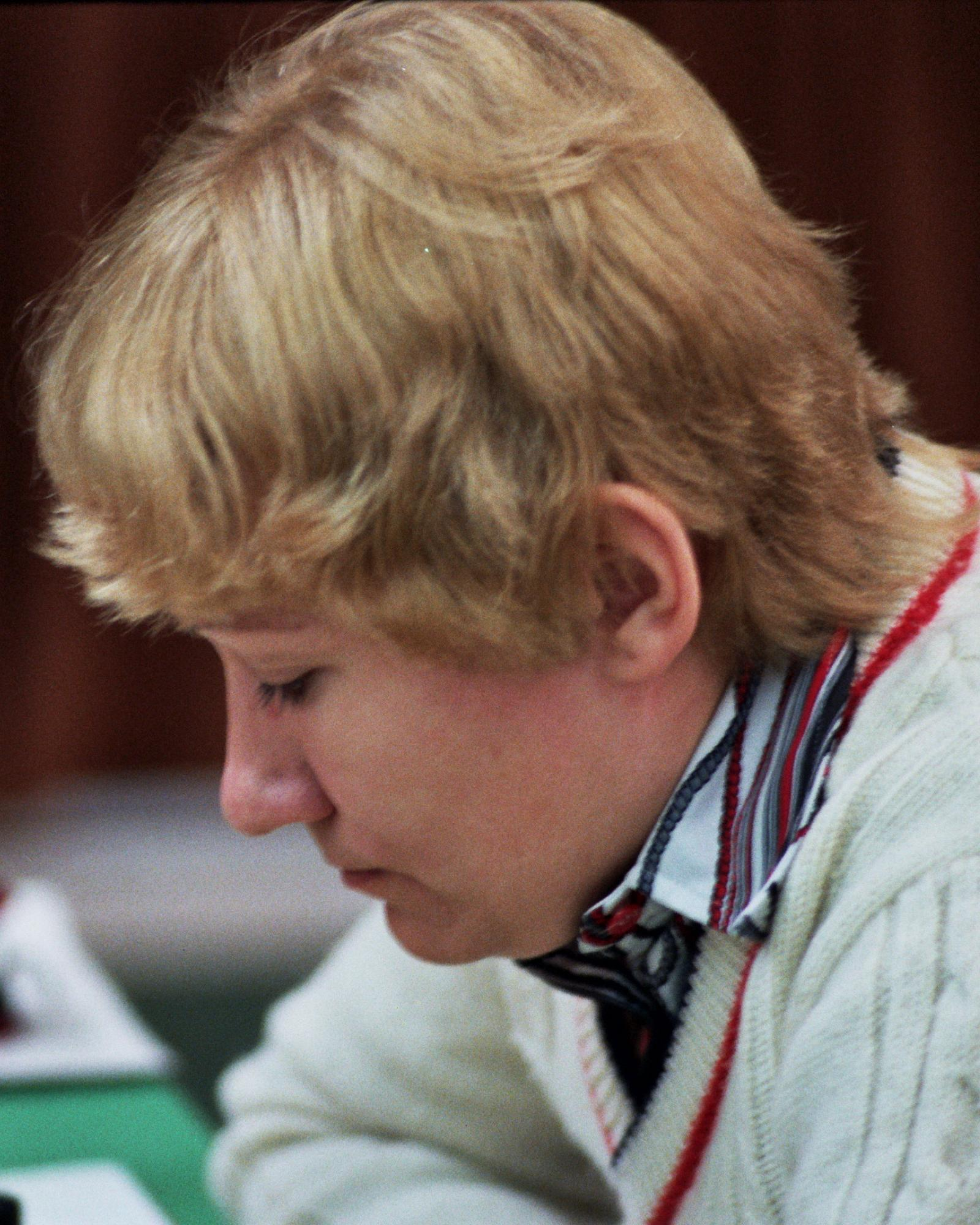
- Verőci in 1982 in Dortmund

Personal information
- Born: February 19, 1949 (age 77)

Chess career
- Country: Hungary
- Title: Woman Grandmaster (1978)
- Peak rating: 2415 (January 1987)

Zsuzsa Verőci (Hungarian: [ˈʒuʒɒ ˈvɛrøːt͡si]; born February 19, 1949) is a Hungarian chess Woman International Master (1969) and Woman Grandmaster (1978). She has also been a FIDE International Arbiter since 1995. Her current FIDE rating is 2246 and her peak rating, from July 2003 to April 2004, was 2315. She was born February 19, 1949, in Budapest, Hungary.

Veroci has represented Hungary ten times in the Women's Chess Olympiad between 1966 and 1992, winning three individual silver medals and two individual bronze.
