= Monika Soćko =

Polish chess grandmaster (born 1978)

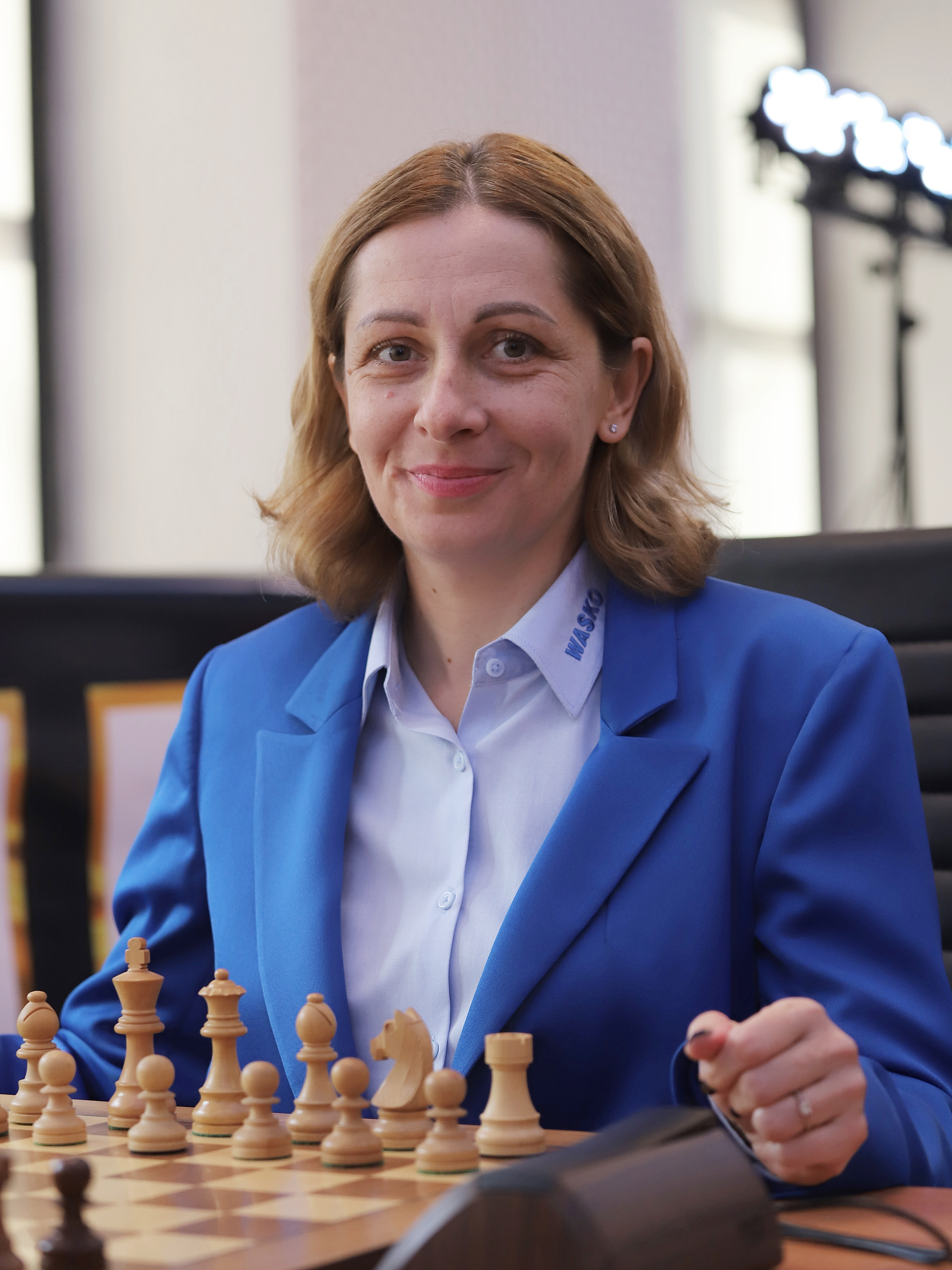
- Monika Soćko (2022)

Personal information
- Born: 24 March 1978 (age 48) Warsaw, Poland
- Spouse: Bartosz Soćko

Chess career
- Country: Poland
- Title: Grandmaster (2008)
- Peak rating: 2505 (April 2008)

Monika Soćko (née Bobrowska; born 24 March 1978) is a Polish chess player who holds the FIDE titles of Grandmaster (GM) and Woman Grandmaster (WGM). She won the Polish women's chess championship eight times (in 1995, 2004, 2008, 2010, 2013, 2014, 2016, 2017).

== Career ==
In 2007, Soćko won an international women's tournament in Baku, Azerbaijan ahead of former Women's World Champion Antoaneta Stefanova. In 2008, she was awarded the title of Grandmaster (GM) by FIDE, becoming the first and, to date, only Polish female player to achieve this. The following year, she won the Arctic Chess Challenge in Tromsø, Norway in spite of being only ranked as number 16 before the tournament, while her top-ranked husband, Bartosz Soćko, finished in 13th place. In March 2010, she won the bronze medal at the Women's European Individual Chess Championship edging out Yelena Dembo and Marie Sebag on tie-breaks.

In 2014 Soćko won the Erfurt Woman Grandmaster round-robin tournament. In 2017 she won the 8th Sharjah Cup for Women 2017 in Sharjah, United Arab Emirates edging out Ukrainian player Svetlana Moskalets on tiebreak score, after both players scored 7½/9 points.

In August 2022 in Prague Soćko won gold medal in European Women's Individual Chess Championship.

As a member of the Polish team, she won the gold medal at the Women's European Team Chess Championship in 2005, silver in 2007 and 2011, and bronze in 2013 and in the 2002 Women's Chess Olympiad.

In May 2024, in Rzeszów she won bronze medal in Polish Women's Chess Championship.

=== Rules appeal in 2008 ===
In the 2008 Women's World Championship she was involved in a game which resulted in a dispute about the interpretation of the FIDE rules of chess. In an armageddon game she needed a win to advance to the next round. The position got down to each player having only a king and a knight in which a checkmate position is possible but cannot be forced. Her opponent, Sabina-Francesca Foisor, ran out of time under the time control. Since checkmate cannot be forced with this material, the arbiter initially ruled that the game was a draw, therefore her opponent advanced to the next round. Soćko appealed, pointing out that the rules state that what matters is not whether or not checkmate can be forced, but rather it is possible (see Rules of chess#Timing). The arbiter compared the possible checkmate position to a helpmate, in which the defender has to cooperate in order to get to the checkmate. Soćko won the appeal and advanced to the next round.
