= Tea Lanchava =

Dutch chess player (born 1974)

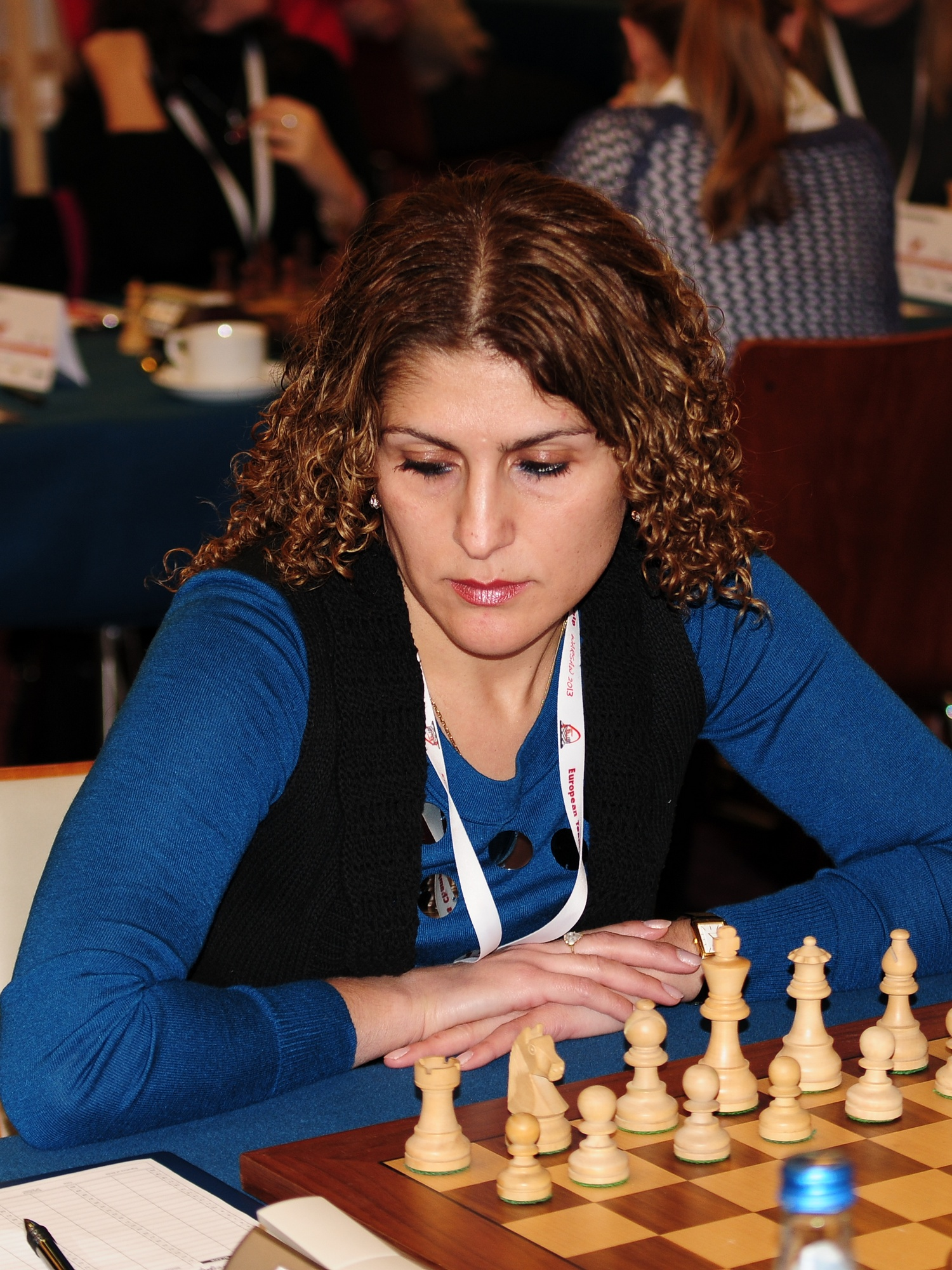
- Lanchava in 2013

Personal information
- Born: 11 September 1974 (age 51) Kutaisi, Georgia

Chess career
- Country: Netherlands
- Title: International Master (2004); Woman Grandmaster (2001)
- Peak rating: 2392 (October 2006)

Tea Lanchava (born 11 September 1974 in Kutaisi, Georgia) is a Dutch chess player who holds the titles of International Master (2004) and Woman Grandmaster (2001). She is a former World Youth Chess Champion in the girls Under 14 (1988) and Under 16 categories (1990).

She has lived in the Netherlands since 1995 and has represented the Royal Dutch Chess Federation since 1997, playing in all Chess Olympiads and European Championships since, except for 2008 and 2009. In 2012, she became Dutch woman champion and she has been runner-up many times more, often behind GM Zhaoqin Peng. At the Dutch women's championships in 2017 she ended in a joint first place, but lost the tie break to Anne Haast. In 2018 she finished second, half a point behind Zhaoqin Peng.

At the European Individual Chess Championship in Kuşadası in 2006, she took the silver medal, after Ekaterina Atalik.

In 2018 she was appointed honorary member of the Dutch Chess Federation.
