= Krzysztof Jakubowski =

Polish chess grandmaster (born 1983)

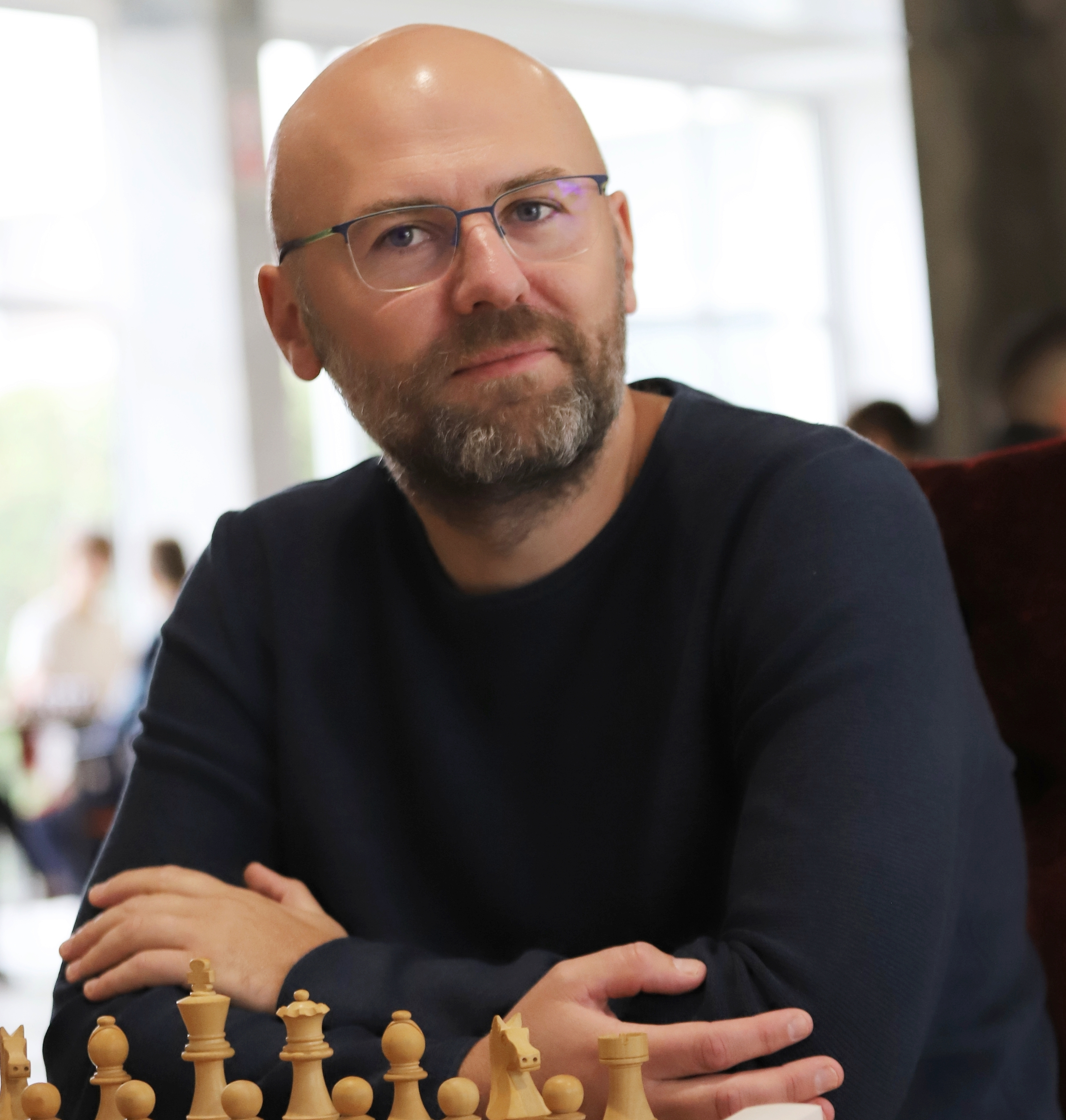
- Jakubowski in 2021

Personal information
- Born: 23 September 1983 (age 42) Łomża, Poland

Chess career
- Country: Poland
- Title: Grandmaster (2009)
- FIDE rating: 2424 (July 2026)
- Peak rating: 2576 (March 2016)

Krzysztof Jakubowski (born 23 September 1983) is a Polish chess Grandmaster (2009).

== Chess career ==
Jakubowski is a multiple medalist of the Polish Junior Chess Championship: silver in 1993 (U10), 2002 (U20), bronze in 1995 (U12), 2000 (U18), 2001 (U18). He also won medals in the Polish Junior Team Chess Championship and Polish Junior Rapid Chess Championship. In 1999, Jakubowski won silver medal in European Youth Chess Championship (U16) in Greece. Several times participated in the Polish Chess Championship finals. Jakubowski has also competed successfully in several Polish Team Chess Championships (individual gold in 2008, and team silver in 2000, 2001). In 2001, he won Swiss-system tournament in Avilés. In 2005, he won B tournament in Gausdal. In 2006, he won tournament in Brno. In 2014, he shared second place (with Andrey Vovk, behind Aleksander Miśta) in Banca Feroviara Open in Arad.
