= Valentina Golubenko =

Estonian-Croatian chess player (born 1990)

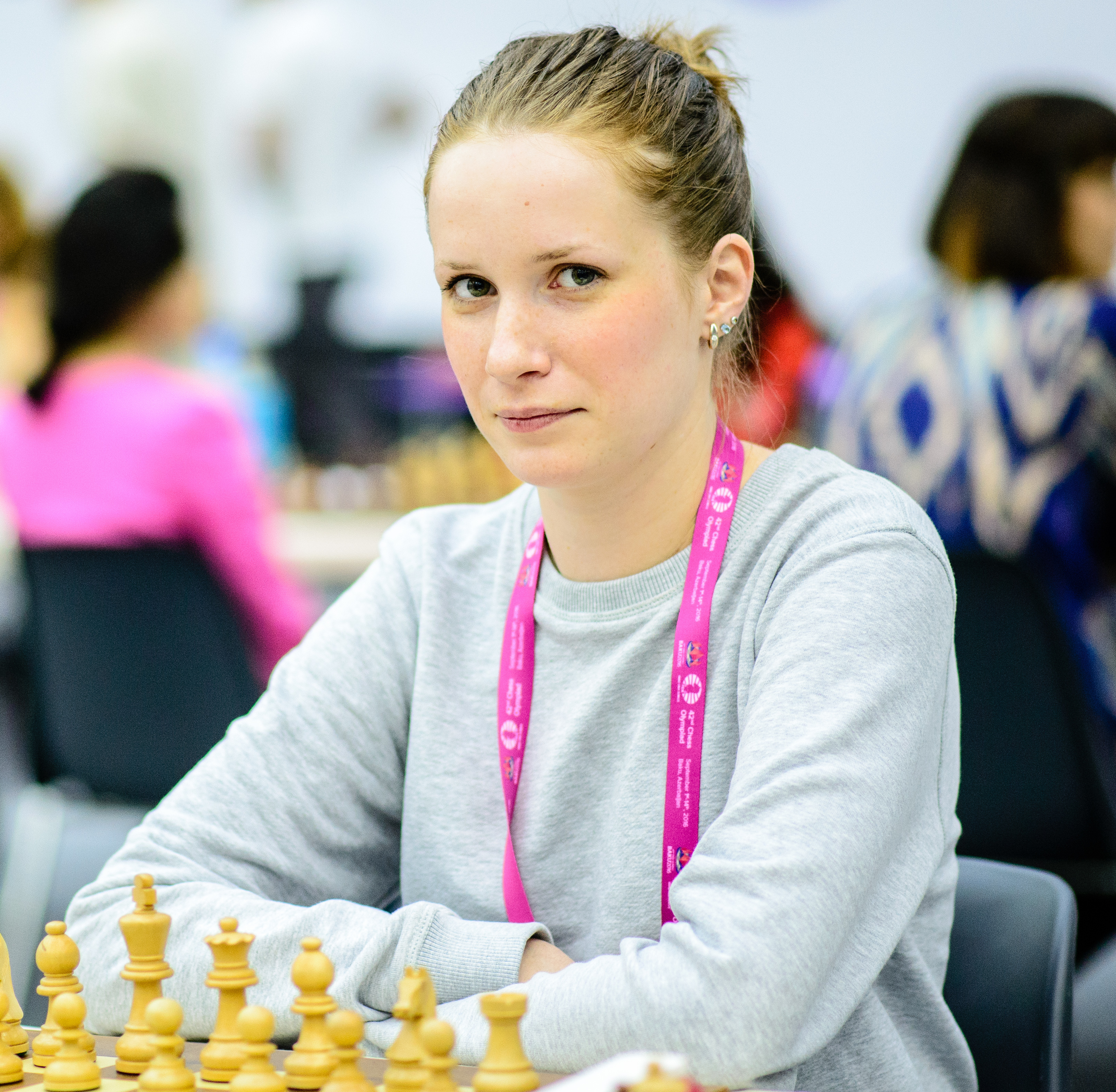
- Golubenko in 2016

Personal information
- Born: 29 July 1990 (age 36) Volgograd, Russian SFSR, Soviet Union

Chess career
- Country: Estonia (until 2007); Croatia (since 2007)
- Title: Woman Grandmaster (2007)
- Peak rating: 2316 (July 2007)

Valentina Golubenko (Russian: Валентина Голубенко; born 29 July 1990) is a Russian-born chess player playing for Croatia, holding the FIDE title of Woman Grandmaster (WGM). She was world champion in the girls under 18 category in 2008. Although she spent her early life playing in Estonia, Golubenko had moved to Croatia as she was not qualified to represent Estonia owing to her Russian citizenship.

== Personal life ==
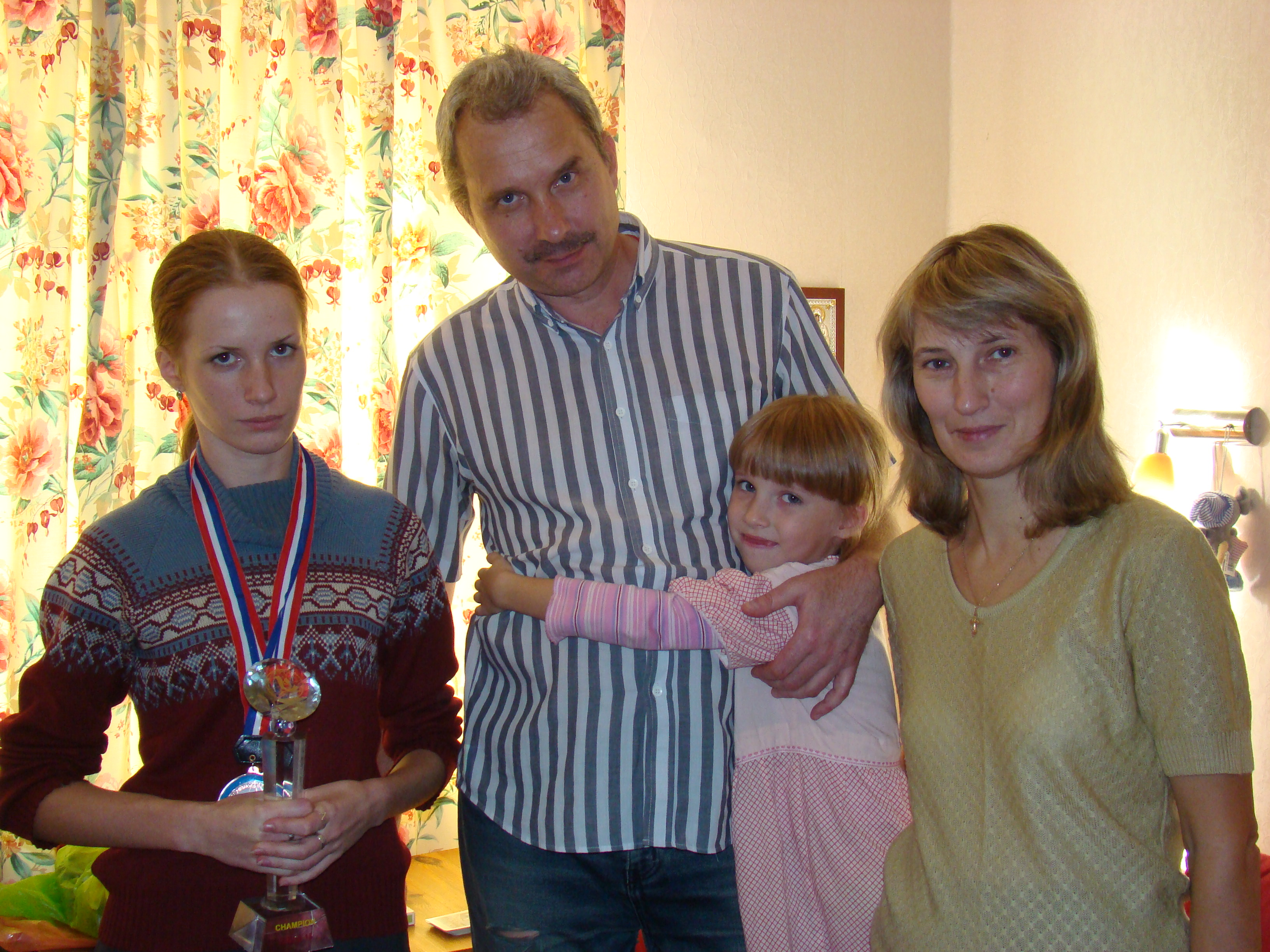
Golubenko family: Valentina, Valery, Valentina's sister Alexandra, Anastasia

Valentina Golubenko was born in Volgograd, Russia to a chess family. Her father, Valery Golubenko is a mathematician and chess player who was champion of Estonia in rapid chess in 1993-1994 and a triple winner on board one in the Estonian Team Championships. Valentina's mother, Anastasia Golubenko, was a qualified chess coach with many years of experience, making the finals of the Moscow women's championship in 1986.

Her mother died at the age of 46.

== Career in Estonia ==
Valentina was coached by her parents and won several youth titles. She won the Estonian championship in different age categories: three times for girls under 10 (1998–2000), once for boys under 10 (1999), five for girls under 12 (1998–2002), four for girls under 14 (2001–2004), twice for girls under 16 (2003–2004), and once for girls under 18 (2004). She was also Estonian rapid chess champion six times (for U18 girls in 2001-2005 and for U18 in 2007) and junior team champion for boys (2003) and for girls (2003 and 2004). In six of those tournaments she obtained 100% score by winning all the games. She was awarded the Woman Grandmaster title in Antalya in November 2007, thanks to her results at the Mediterranean Flower WGM Tournament in Rijeka 2006 and at the European Women's Championship 2007 in Dresden, becoming the first ever resident Estonian to receive it.

Despite having lived all her life in Estonia, Valentina Golubenko and her parents decided to hold Russian citizenship. Thus, since 2003 she has not been allowed to represent Estonia in the international chess championships, as according to the article 8 of the Sport Act of Estonia only citizens of Estonia and children under age of 18 residing in Estonia and without citizenship of any other country can (as individuals or team members) represent Estonia in international championships, such as World and European championships and Olympic Games. Golubenko's family claims that the decision of the Federation contradicts FIDE's General Rules for participation in FIDE events. Estonia's leading grandmaster Jaan Ehlvest agrees with this opinion. Still the Estonian Chess Federation has not allowed Golubenko to play under the Estonian flag despite open letters to FIDE written by both Golubenko's parents, because of the requirement of citizenship set in the Sport Act. As a solution, the Estonian Chess Federation proposed Golubenko to apply for Estonian citizenship; this proposal was rejected by the Golubenko's family.

== Career in Croatia ==
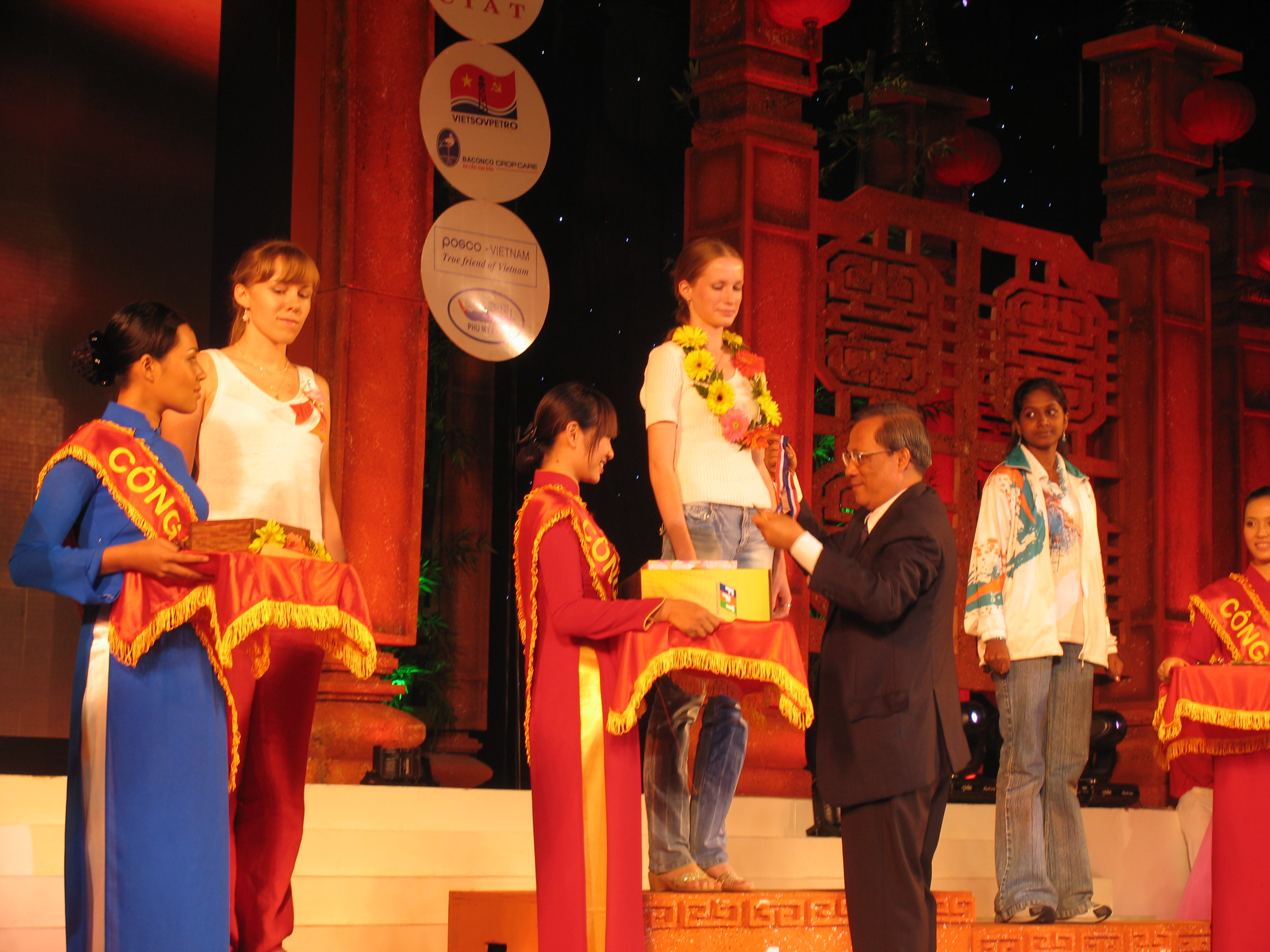
Valentina Golubenko receives Gold Medal of the World Youth Chess Championship, 30 October 2008

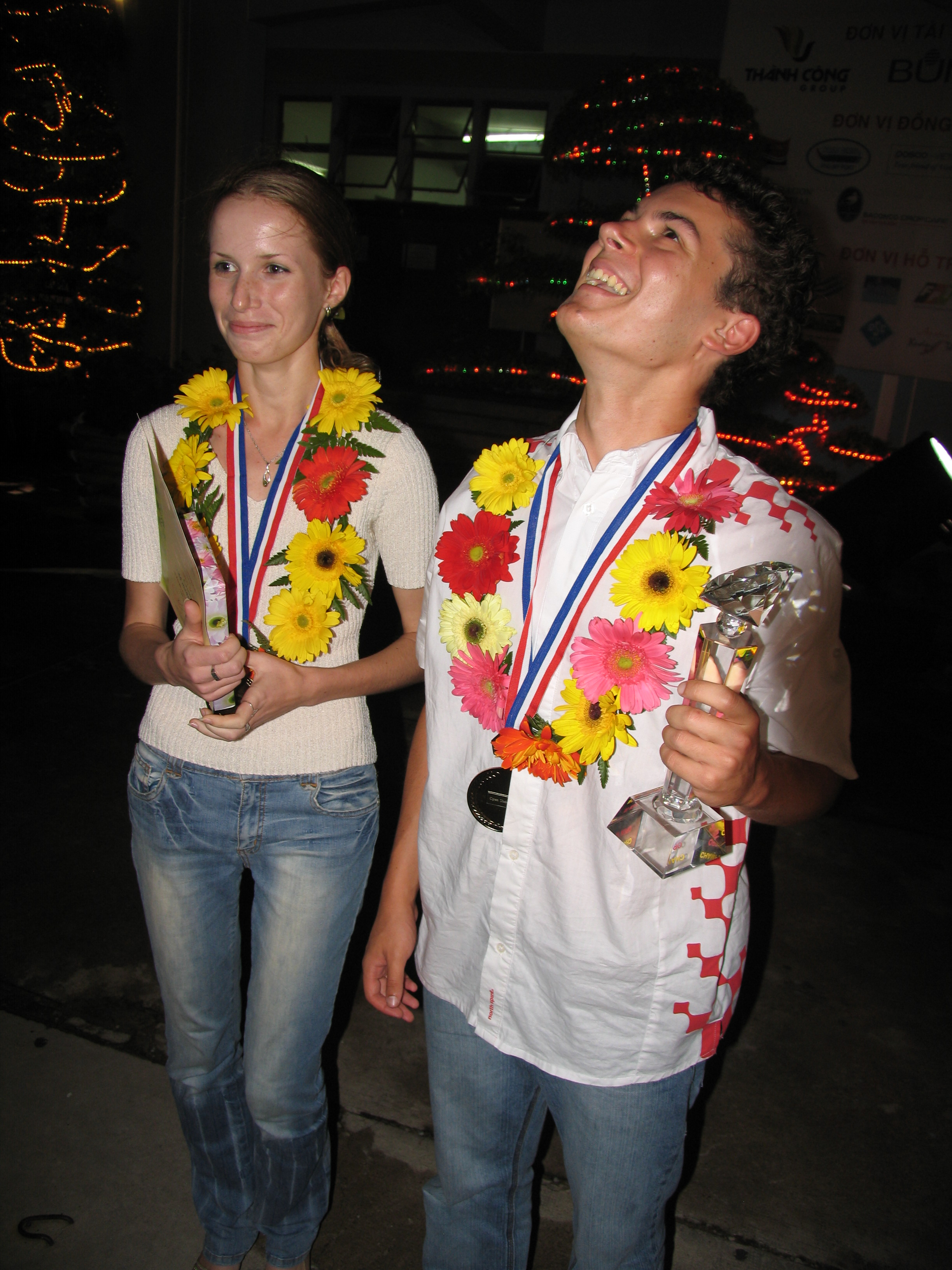
Valentina Golubenko with Ivan Šarić, World Youth Chess Championship, 30 October 2008

Golubenko was offered membership in the chess club "Draga" from Rijeka, Croatia, together with a Croatian citizenship. As Golubenko was denied to play for Estonia and her strength was not enough for Russia, she decided to play under the flag of Croatia, which was allowed by FIDE. Her new club organized training with Ognjen Cvitan for her and Lara Stock.

She took part in the Women's World Chess Championship 2008, where she lost to Viktorija Čmilytė from Lithuania in the first round. In October 2008 Valentina Golubenko won the gold medal at the World Youth Chess Championship in the under 18 girls category by scoring 9 points out of 11, one point ahead of the runner-up. In 2014, she won the Croatian women's championship.

She has played for Croatia in five women's Chess Olympiads between 2008 and 2016. She also played for Croatia in three European Team Chess Championships between 2007 and 2011.

Golubenko ceased playing around 2017, after the European Team Championship in Crete, which caused her not to be called up for the national team in 2018 and a controversy erupted over that decision. She was believed to have left Croatia in 2018. She did appear in the national team in 2019.
