= Alexandra Kosteniuk =

Russian-Swiss chess grandmaster (born 1984)

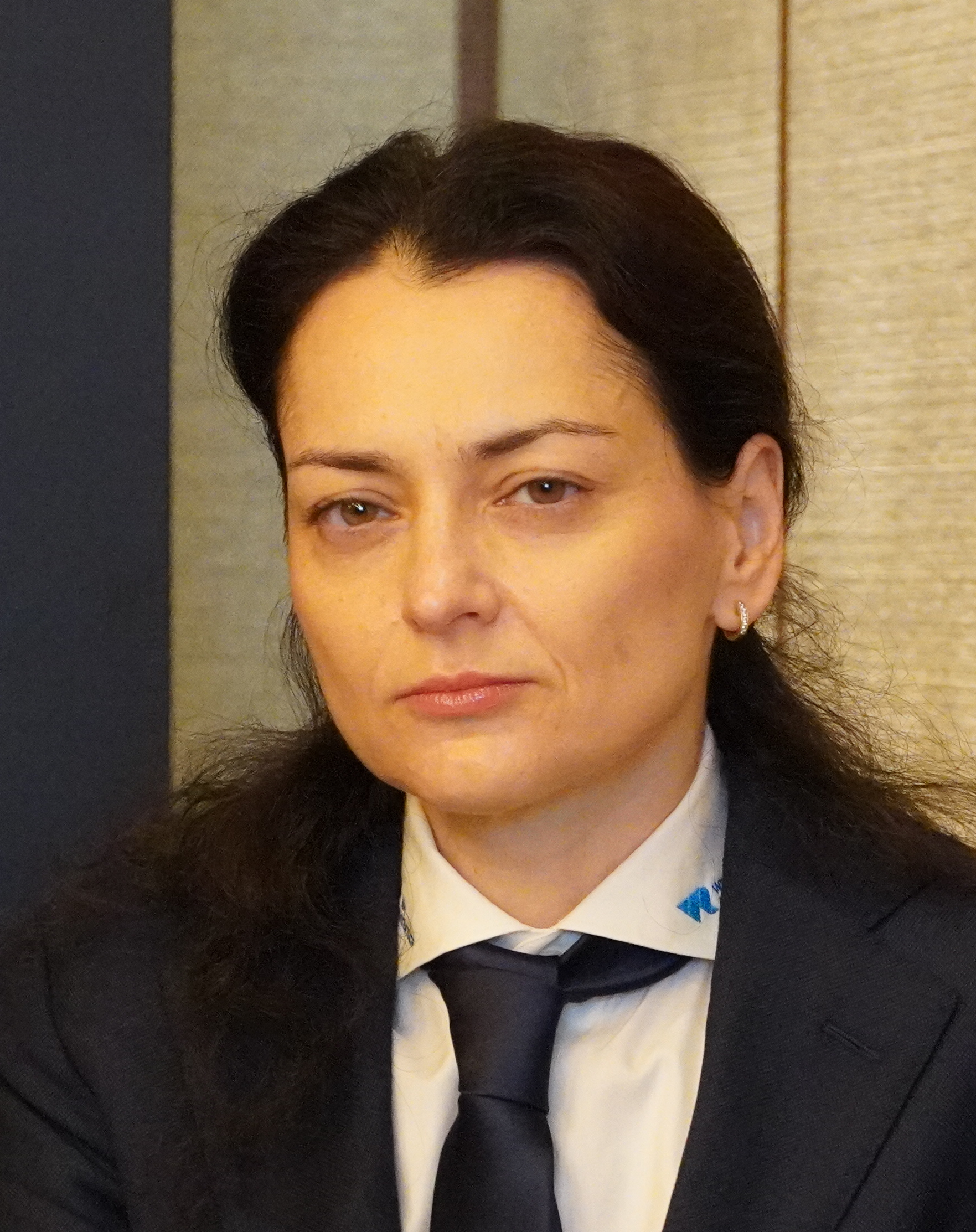
- Kosteniuk in 2026

Personal information
- Born: Alexandra Konstantinovna Kosteniuk; 23 April 1984 (age 42) Perm, Russian SFSR, Soviet Union
- Spouses: Diego Garces (m. 2002, divorced) Pavel Tregubov (m. 2015)

Chess career
- Country: Russia (before 2022); FIDE (2022–2023) (Note: Several Russian players officially switched federations in response to the 2022 Russian invasion of Ukraine.); Switzerland (since 2023)
- Title: Grandmaster (2004)
- Women's World Champion: 2008–10
- FIDE rating: 2478 (November 2026)
- Peak rating: 2561 (January 2018)

Alexandra Konstantinovna Kosteniuk (Russian: Александра Константиновна Костенюк; born 23 April 1984) is a Russian and Swiss chess grandmaster who was the Women's World Chess Champion from 2008 to 2010 and Women's World Rapid Chess Champion in 2021. She was European women's champion in 2004 and a two-time Russian Women's Chess Champion (in 2005 and 2016). Kosteniuk won the team gold medal playing for Russia at the Women's Chess Olympiads of 2010, 2012 and 2014; the Women's World Team Chess Championship of 2017; and the Women's European Team Chess Championships of 2007, 2009, 2011, 2015 and 2017 and the Women's Chess World Cup 2021. In 2022, due to sanctions imposed on Russian players after the Russian invasion of Ukraine, she switched federations, and since March 2023 she has represented Switzerland.

== Chess career ==
Kosteniuk learned to play chess at the age of five after being taught by her father. She graduated in 2003 from the Russian State Academy of Physical Education in Moscow as a certified professional chess trainer. As a child, she played casual chess for money, in order to earn resources for chess trips.

Kosteniuk won the girls under 10 division of the European Youth Chess Championship in 1994 and the girls under 12 title at both the European Youth Championships and World Youth Chess Championships in 1996. At twelve years of age she also became the Russian women's champion in rapid chess.

In 2001, at the age of 17, she reached the final of the World Women's Chess Championship won by Zhu Chen.

Kosteniuk became European women's champion by winning the tournament in Dresden, Germany. As she achieved this with a performance rating above 2600, she was awarded the grandmaster title in November 2004, becoming the tenth woman to receive the highest title of the World Chess Federation (FIDE). Before that, she had also obtained the titles of Woman Grandmaster in 1998 and International Master in 2000.

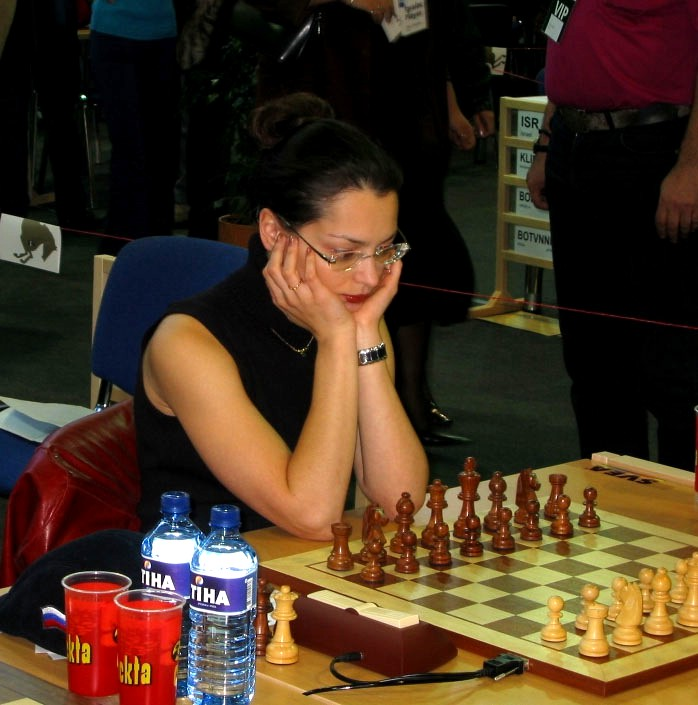
Kosteniuk at the 35th Chess Olympiad, Bled 2002

In 2005, she won the Russian Women's Championship.

In August 2006, she became the first Chess960 women's world champion after beating Germany's top female player Elisabeth Pähtz by 5½–2½. She defended that title successfully in 2008 by beating Kateryna Lagno 2½–1½. However, Kosteniuk's greatest success so far has been to win the Women's World Chess Championship 2008, beating in the final the young Chinese prodigy Hou Yifan with a score of 2½–1½. Later in the same year, she won the women's individual blitz event of the 2008 World Mind Sports Games in Beijing.

In the Women's World Chess Championship 2010 Kosteniuk was eliminated in the third round by the eventual runner-up, Ruan Lufei, and thus lost her title.

In 2013, Kosteniuk became the first woman to win the open section of the Swiss Chess Championship. She also won the women Swiss champion title.

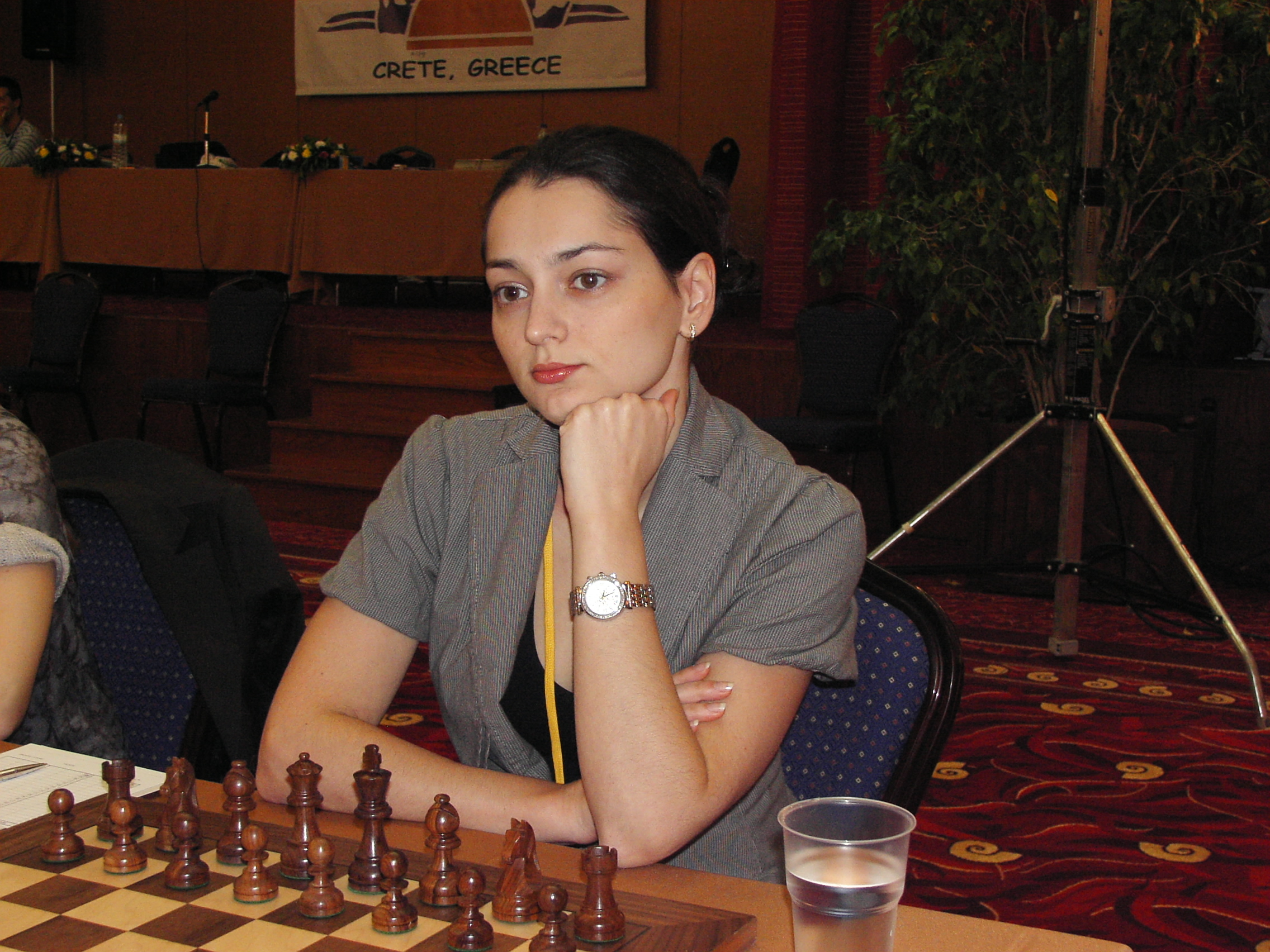
Alexandra Kosteniuk, 2007

In 2014, she tied for first place with Kateryna Lagno in the Women's World Rapid Championship, which was held in Khanty-Mansiysk, and took the silver medal on tiebreak, as Lagno won the direct encounter.

In 2015 Kosteniuk won the European–ACP Women's Rapid Championship in Kutaisi. In July of the same year, she lost the Swiss championship playoff to Vadim Milov, and was declared women's Swiss champion. Kosteniuk again won the Russian Women's Championship.

In 2017 she won the European ACP Women's Blitz Championship in Monte Carlo.

In late May, Alexandra faced Ukrainian-American International Master Anna Zatonskih in the quarterfinal match of the 2019 Women's Speed Chess Championship, an online blitz and bullet competition hosted by Chess.com. Kosteniuk dominated the match and won with an overall score of 20–8. In late November, Kosteniuk won the European Women's rapid and blitz championships in Monaco. In December, she shared first place in the second leg of FIDE Women's Grand Prix 2019–20 in Monaco. In December she also achieved 2nd place in the Belt and Road World Chess Woman Summit, behind Hou Yifan.

In August 2020, Alexandra was part of the Russian team which shared the gold medal with India in the Online Chess Olympiad. She was unhappy with this result and has also tweeted regarding this issue, drawing criticism from many chess followers.

In July and August 2021, Kosteniuk participated in the inaugural Women's Chess World Cup, a 103-player knockout tournament in Sochi, Russia, held in parallel with the open Chess World Cup. Seeded 14th in the tournament, she won all of her classical matches without ever needing to play a tiebreak, defeating Deysi Cori, Pia Cramling, Mariya Muzychuk, Valentina Gunina and Tan Zhongyi, before winning the tournament with a 1.5 - 0.5 score against top seed Aleksandra Goryachkina in the finals. In addition to $50,000 in prize money, she also gained 43 rating points and a place in the Women's Candidates Tournament 2022.

Kosteniuk ended 2021 by winning the Women's World Rapid Championship in Warsaw, with an undefeated and unequalled 9.0 out of 11 score. She also placed second behind IM Bibisara Assaubayeva in the blitz championship.

== Other activities ==
Kosteniuk worked as a model and also acted in the film Bless the Woman by Stanislav Govorukhin.

Kosteniuk is a member of the "Champions for Peace" club, a group of 54 famous elite athletes committed to serving peace in the world through sport, created by Peace and Sport, a Monaco-based international organization.

Together with 43 other Russian elite chess players, Kosteniuk signed an open letter to Russian president Vladimir Putin protesting against the 2022 Russian invasion of Ukraine.

== Personal life ==
Born in Perm, Kosteniuk moved to Moscow in 1985. She has a younger sister named Oksana, who is a Woman FIDE Master-level chess player.

Kosteniuk has dual Swiss-Russian citizenship. She married Swiss-born businessman Diego Garces born in 1959, who is of Colombian descent, at eighteen years old. On 22 April 2007 she gave birth to a daughter, Francesca Maria. Francesca was born two-and-a-half months premature, but made a full recovery after an eight-week stay in the hospital.

In 2015, Kosteniuk married Russian Grandmaster Pavel Tregubov.

== Notable games ==
- The World vs Alexandra Kosteniuk, 2004, Sicilian Defense: Najdorf Variation. English Attack (B90), 0–1
- Alexandra Kosteniuk vs Alexander Onischuk, Corus, Group B 2005, Spanish Game: Classical Variation (C65), 1–0
- Anna Ushenina vs Alexandra Kosteniuk, WWCh. 2008, Nimzo-Indian Defense: Classical, Noa Variation (E34), 0–1
- Nodirbek Abdusattorov vs Alexandra Kostenuik, WR Chess 2024, Caro-Cann Defence: Tartakower Variation (B15), 0-1

== Bibliography ==
- Kosteniuk, Alexandra (2001). How I became a grandmaster at age 14. Moscow. ISBN 5829300435.
- Как стать гроссмейстером в 14 лет. Moscow, 2001. 202, [2] с., [16] л. ил. ISBN 5-89069-053-1.
- Как научить шахматам : дошкольный шахматный учебник / Александра Костенюк, Наталия Костенюк. Moscow : Russian Chess House, 2008. 142 с ISBN 978-5-94693-085-7.
- Kosteniuk, Alexandra (2009). Diary of a Chess Queen. Mongoose Press. ISBN 978-0-9791482-7-9.

== Notes ==
Preceded by Xu Yuhua	Women's World Chess Champion; 2008–2010	Succeeded by Hou Yifan
