= Lilit Mkrtchian =

Armenian chess player (born 1982)

- Mkrtchian in 2026

Personal information
- Born: 9 August 1982 (age 44) Yerevan, Armenian SSR, Soviet Union

Chess career
- Country: Armenia
- Title: International Master (2003); Woman Grandmaster (1998)
- Peak rating: 2503 (January 2010)

Lilit Mkrtchian or Lilit Mkrtchyan (Armenian: Լիլիթ Մկրտչյան; born 9 August 1982) is an Armenian chess player. She holds the titles of International Master (IM) and Woman Grandmaster (WGM), which FIDE awarded her in 2003 and 1998 respectively. Mkrtchian is a four-time Armenian women's chess champion.

== Career ==
In 2002, Mkrtchian won the silver medal in the European Individual Women's Championship in Varna, Bulgaria, scoring 8½/11 points. She participated in the Women's European Team Chess Championship 2003 in Plovdiv, Bulgaria, helping Armenia to win the gold medal. Mkrtchian took the bronze medal at the 7th European Women's Individual Championship 2006 held in Kuşadası, Turkey, scoring 7½/11 points. In the 2009 edition she tied with Tatiana Kosintseva for first place scoring 8½/11 and took silver after losing the playoff.

In December 2009, she took tenth position in the list of best sportspeople of Armenia in 2009.

In 2013, she came third at the European Women's Individual Championship. In the 2015 Women's World Team Chess Championship in Chengdu (China) Mkrtchian won the individual gold medal on the second board.
