= Shen Yang (chess player) =

Chinese chess player

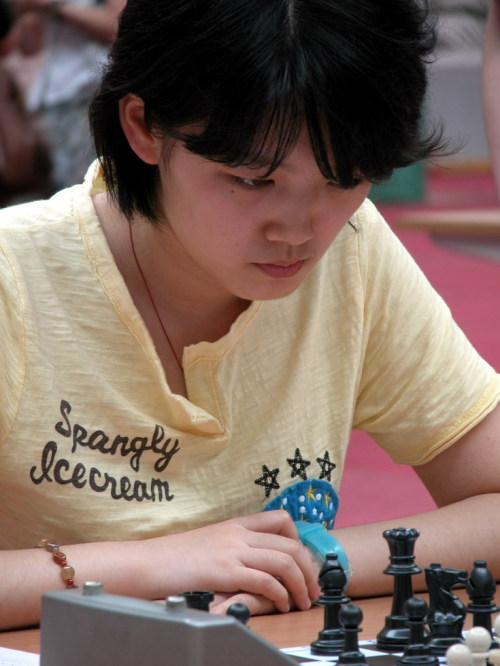

Personal information
- Born: January 23, 1989 (age 37) Nanjing, Jiangsu, China

Chess career
- Country: China
- Title: International Master (2013); Woman Grandmaster (2006)
- Peak rating: 2479 (September 2016)

Shen Yang (simplified Chinese: 沈阳; traditional Chinese: 沈陽; pinyin: Shěn Yáng; born January 23, 1989 in Nanjing, Jiangsu) is a Chinese chess player who holds the titles of International master and Woman Grandmaster.

Shen Yang plays for Jiangsu chess club in the China Chess League (CCL).

== Career ==
In 2001, she won the U-12 Girls section of the World Youth Chess Championship in Spain.

A notable game occurred in the World Team Chess Championship, held in Beersheba, Israel on October–November 2005, where Shen - then rated 2326 - managed to defeat 2652-rated Russian GM Sergei Rublevsky.

In the May–June 2006 37th Chess Olympiad in Turin she was part of the Chinese team that came third in the women's section.

In October 2006, she won the Girls' World Junior Championship in Yerevan, Armenia.

In May 2007, she was part of the Chinese team that won the first Women's World Team Chess Championship in Yekaterinburg, Russia.

In the Russian Team Championship Shen plays for the women's team of ACADEMY Tomsk on Board 2.

In August–September 2008 at the Women's World Chess Championship in Nalchik she was knocked out in the fourth round 0.0-2.0 by Humpy Koneru.

In September 2008, she competed in the 5th China-Russia Match in Ningbo where she scored the highest in the women's category with 4.0/5 and had a performance rating of 2706.

On 6 June 2009, she won the women's Chinese Chess Championship in Xinghua with 9 points out of 11 games.

In March 2014 she came second in the women's Chinese Chess Championship, behind Ju Wenjun.

She competed in the Women's World Chess Championship 2015, in which she was knocked out in the second round by Alexandra Kosteniuk, after defeating Alina Kashlinskaya in the first one.

In March 2015 she was part of the Chinese team that came third in the Women's World Team Chess Championship in Chengdu, China.

In May 2015 she came second in the women's Chinese Chess Championship, behind Tan Zhongyi.

In July 2015 she was the top scorer with 4/5 in the women's section of the 9th China-Russia Match in Ningbo, China.

== See also ==
- Chess in China

Preceded by Hou Yifan	Women's Chinese Chess Champion; 2009	Succeeded by Ju Wenjun
