= Tatiana Kosintseva =

Russian chess grandmaster (born 1986)

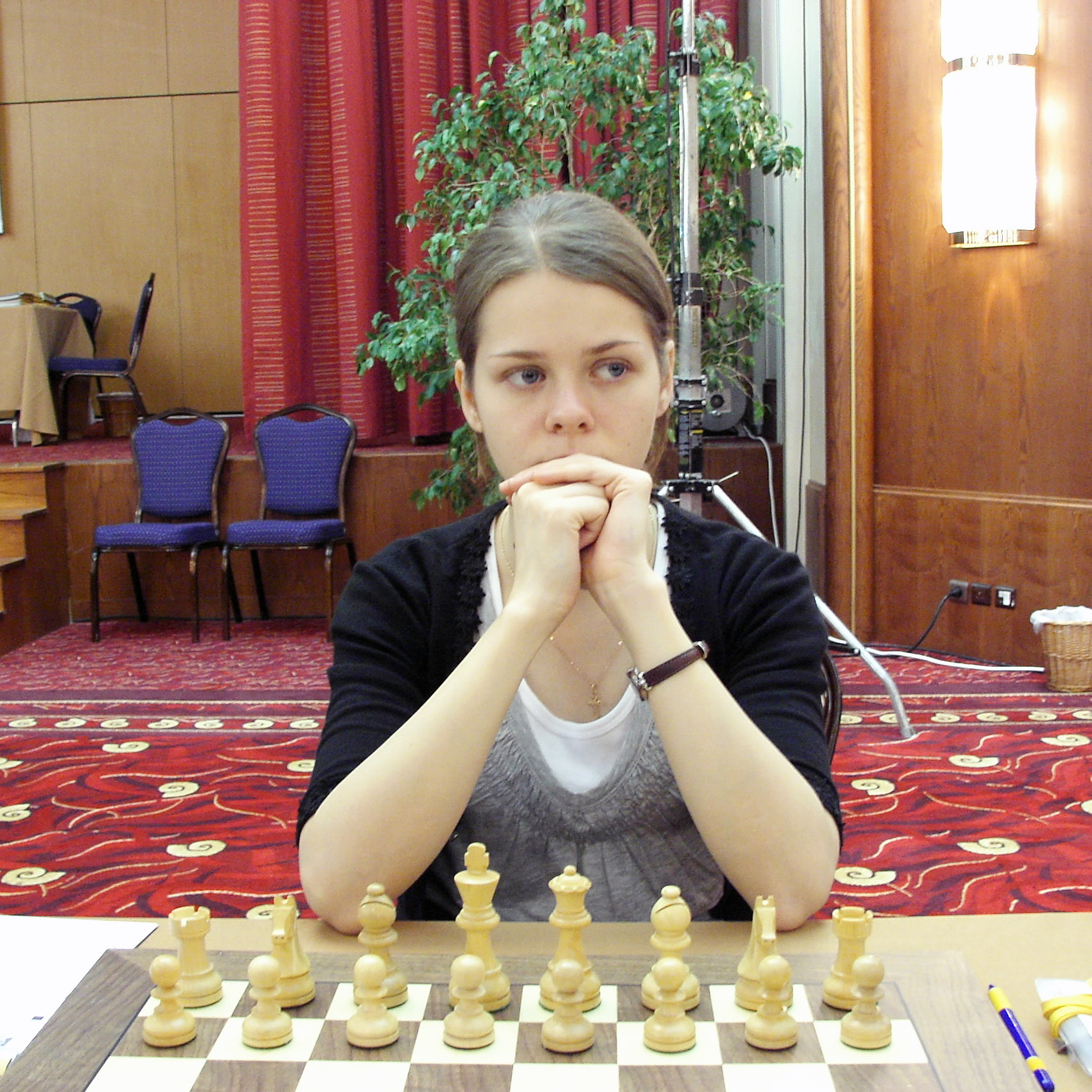
- Tatiana Kosintseva at Iraklion, 2007

Personal information
- Born: Tatiana Anatolyevna Kosintseva; 11 April 1986 (age 40) Arkhangelsk, Russian SFSR, Soviet Union

Chess career
- Country: Russia
- Title: Grandmaster (2009)
- FIDE rating: 2475 (September 2026)
- Peak rating: 2581 (November 2010)

Tatiana Anatolyevna Kosintseva (Russian: Татьяна Анатольевна Косинцева; born 11 April 1986) is a Russian chess grandmaster. She was awarded the title Grandmaster by FIDE in 2007. Kosintseva is a two-time European women's champion and three-time Russian women's champion. She was a member of the gold medal-winning Russian team at the Women's Chess Olympiads of 2010 and 2012, and at the Women's European Team Chess Championships of 2007, 2009 and 2011.

== Career ==
Kosintseva started to play chess at 6 years old along with elder sister Nadezhda, when coming back home from dance lessons with their mother they happened upon a chess club and decided then and there to take up the game. As a youngster, she recalls being inspired by a book of former world champion Alexander Alekhine's games and was similarly impressed by the games of Garry Kasparov and Bobby Fischer.

At the World Youth Chess Championships, she earned silver medals at the Girls Under 10 (Cala Galdana, 1996) and Girls Under 12 (Cannes, 1997) events. Kosintseva won the gold medal in the Girls Under 10 category of the 1996 European Youth Chess Championships, held at Rimavska Sobota. Silver medals were added at the European events in Mureck (1998) and Kallithea (2000), at the Girls Under 12 and Girls Under 18 levels, respectively.

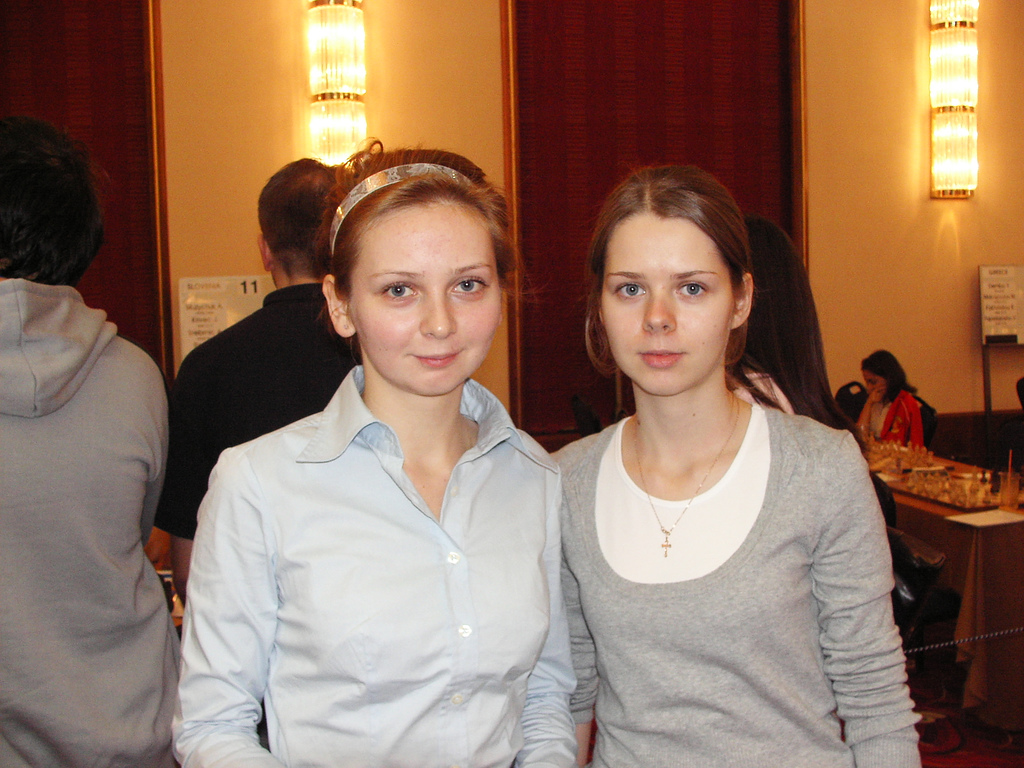
Kosintseva sisters, Nadezhda (left) and Tatiana

In 2002, 2004 and 2007 Kosintseva won the Russian Women's Chess Championship. In 2006, she finished a half point behind the winner, Ekaterina Korbut. Also in 2004, Kosintseva won the Accentus Ladies Tournament at the Biel Chess Festival.

She won the European Individual Women's Chess Championship in 2007 with a tournament performance rating (TPR) of 2774. She won again in 2009 after prevailing in a rapidplay playoff with Lilit Mkrtchian by 1½–½. Both players finished the tournament on a score of 8½/11 points.

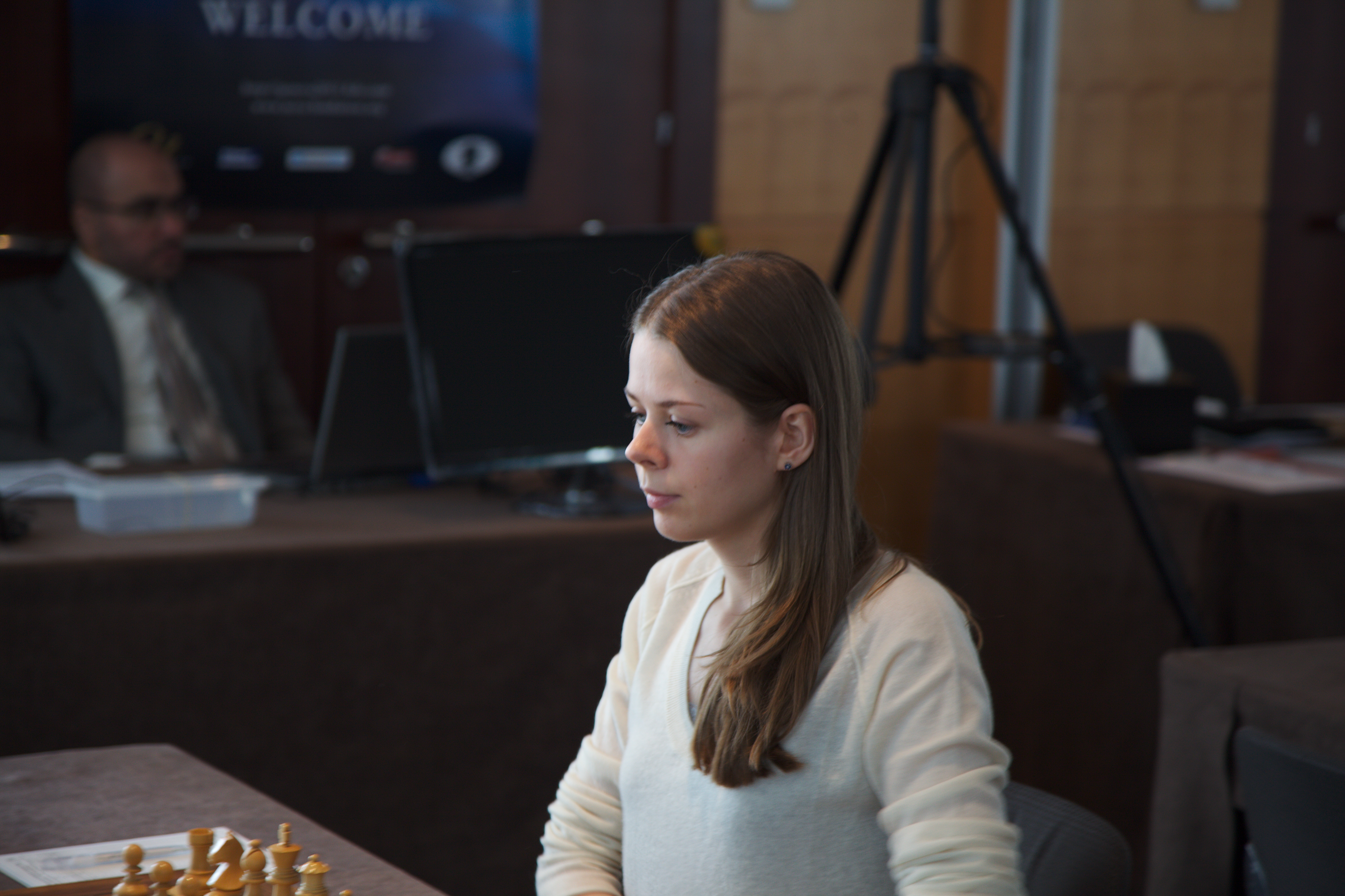
Kosintseva, 2013

In 2010 Kosintseva won the FIDE Women's Grand Prix event in Nalchik with a performance rating of 2735. Her score was 9/11 (+7−0=4), 1½ points ahead of her nearest rival, Hou Yifan. She gained 160 Grand Prix points in Nalchik.

In 2012, Kosintseva won the European Women's Rapid Chess Championship in Gaziantep, Turkey. In April 2014, she won the bronze medal at the Women's World Blitz Chess Championship in Khanty-Mansiysk. In July of the same year, she took the silver medal in the European Individual Women's Championship in Plovdiv, Bulgaria scoring 8½/11 points.

She has not played a FIDE-rated classical game since March 2015.

== Personal life ==
Along with her sister Nadezhda, Kosintseva attended a law course at Pomor University in their hometown, Arkhangelsk. They both graduated in 2008.
