= Ekaterina Korbut =

Russian chess player

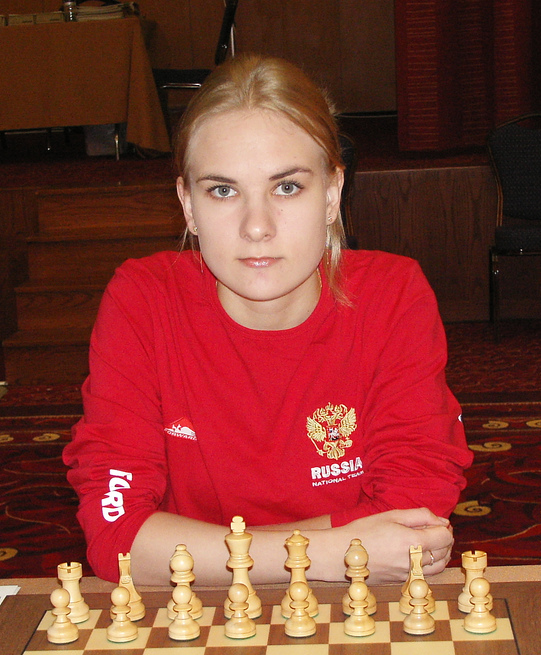
- Ekaterina Korbut in Heraklion

Personal information
- Born: Ekaterina Valerievna Korbut; 9 February 1985 (age 41) Tashkent, Uzbek SSR, Soviet Union

Chess career
- Country: Russia
- Title: International Master (2007); Woman Grandmaster (2001)
- FIDE rating: 2448 (July 2026)
- Peak rating: 2468 (April 2008)

Ekaterina Valerievna Korbut (born February 9, 1985, in Tashkent) is a Russian chess player, who holds the titles of International master and Woman Grandmaster. She won the World Junior Chess Championship (Girls) in 2004, and the Russian women's championship in 2006.

She competed in the Women's World Chess Championship 2006 but went out to Anna Ushenina in the first round. She qualified for the 2008 championship but did not take part.

She has played no serious chess since 2008; according to her friend Ekaterina Atalik she married and had a daughter, and is now focused on her family life.
