= Inna Gaponenko =

Ukrainian chess player

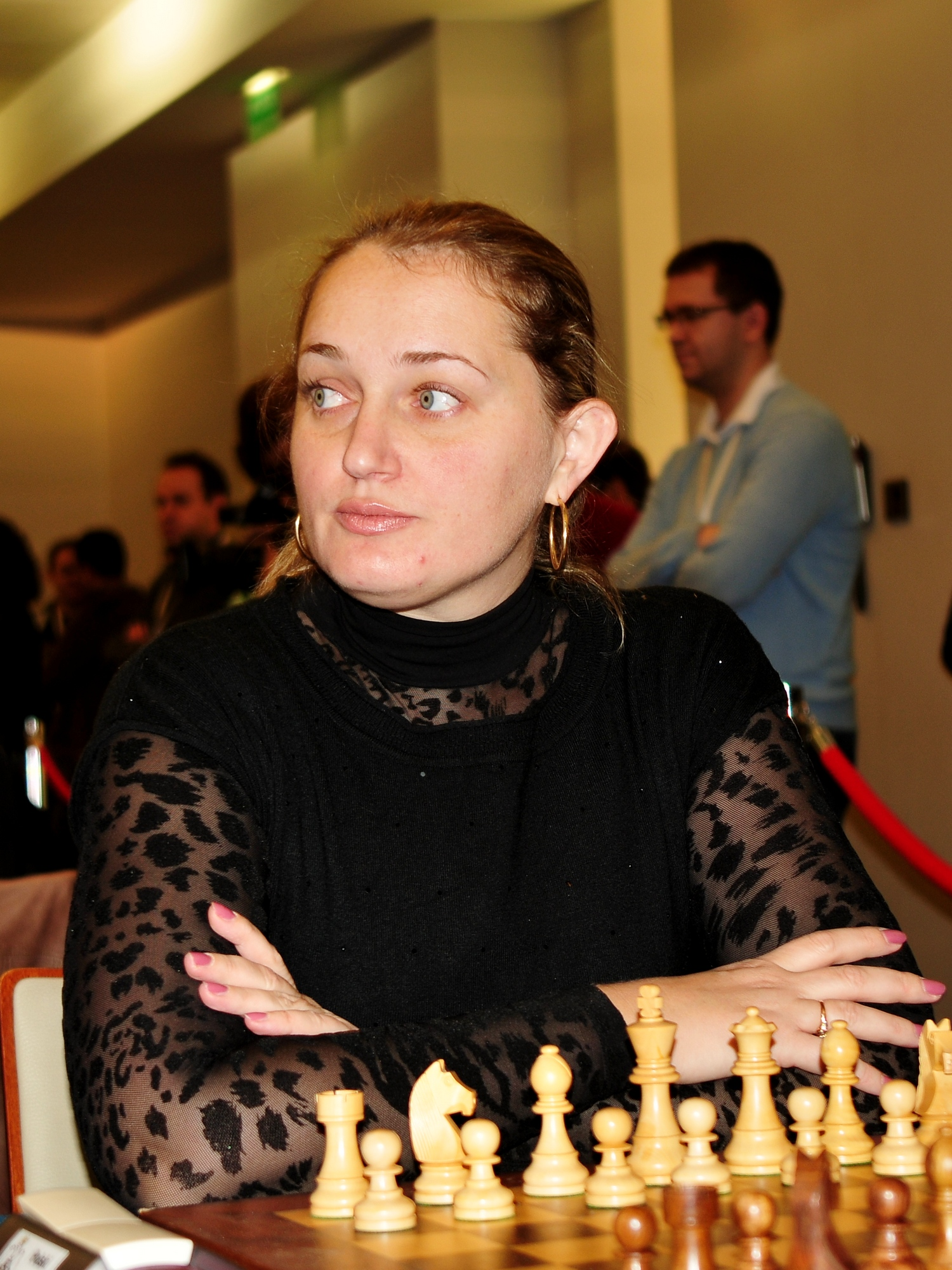
- Inna Gaponenko (2013)

Personal information
- Born: June 22, 1976 (age 50) Kherson, Ukrainian SSR, Soviet Union

Chess career
- Country: Ukraine
- Title: International Master (2002); Woman Grandmaster (1995)
- Peak rating: 2482 (April 2005)

Inna Hryhorivna Gaponenko (Ukrainian: Інна Григорівна Гапоненко; Yanovska after marriage (Яновська); born 22 June 1976) is a Ukrainian chess player holding the titles of International Master (IM) and Woman Grandmaster (WGM).

== Career ==
She won the European under-16 girls' championship in 1992 and the world under-18 girls' championship in 1994. In 2002 Gaponenko won the European Women's Rapid Chess Championship in Antalya. She won the Ukrainian women's championship in 2008.

Gaponenko played for the Ukrainian national team at the biennial Women's Chess Olympiads from 1994 to 1998 and from 2002 to 2014. She won team gold medal in 2006, silver in 2008, bronze in 2012 and 2014, and individual gold in 2010 for the best performance on board 4. In the Women's World Team Chess Championship she took team gold in 2013, bronze in 2007 and 2009, and two individual gold medals (in 2007 and 2009). She played also for the gold medal-winning Ukrainian team in the 2013 Women's European Team Chess Championship in Warsaw.
