= Women's World Chess Championship 2004 =

Chess tournament in Elista, Russia

The Women's World Chess Championship 2004 took place from May 21 to June 4, 2004 in Elista, Russia. It was won by Antoaneta Stefanova, who beat Ekaterina Kovalevskaya in the final by 2½ to ½.

For the third time, the championship took the form of a 64-player knock-out tournament.

== Participants ==
Qualified players were seeded by their Elo ratings (on the April 2004 list).

1. Humpy Koneru (IND), 2513, GM (AS)
2. Alisa Galliamova (RUS), 2502, IM (R)
3. Maia Chiburdanidze (GEO), 2502, GM (WC)
4. Svetlana Matveeva (RUS), 2496, WGM (E)
5. Kateryna Lahno (UKR), 2493, IM (PN)
6. Pia Cramling (SWE), 2491, GM (R)
7. Antoaneta Stefanova (BUL), 2490, GM (R)
8. Zhao Xue (CHN), 2477, WGM (J)
9. Xu Yuhua (CHN), 2474, WGM (WC)
10. Natalia Zhukova (UKR), 2471, WGM (E)
11. Alexandra Kosteniuk (RUS), 2469, IM (WC)
12. Ekaterina Kovalevskaya (RUS), 2467, WGM (E)
13. Irina Krush (USA), 2465, IM (Z2.1)
14. Almira Skripchenko (FRA), 2456, IM (R)
15. Nana Dzagnidze (GEO), 2452, WGM (PN)
16. Tatiana Kosintseva (RUS), 2451, WGM (E)
17. Hoang Thanh Trang (VIE), 2447, IM (AS)
18. Iweta Radziewicz (POL), 2444, IM (E)
19. Corina-Isabela Peptan (ROM), 2439, IM (E)
20. Ketino Kachiani-Gersinska (GER), 2439, IM (E)
21. Olga Alexandrova (UKR), 2430, IM (R)
22. Viktorija Čmilytė (LTU), 2430, IM (E)
23. Nadezhda Kosintseva (RUS), 2425, WGM (E)
24. Elina Danielian (ARM), 2418, IM (E)
25. Wang Pin (CHN), 2417, WGM (R)
26. Xu Yuanyuan (CHN), 2410, WGM (Z3.5)
27. Monika Soćko (POL), 2408, IM (E)
28. Ekaterina Polovnikova (RUS), 2406, WGM (E)
29. Natasa Bojkovic (SCG), 2400, WGM (E)
30. Marie Sebag (FRA), 2398, IM (E)
31. Maia Lomineishvili (GEO), 2397, IM (E)
32. Peng Zhaoqin (NED), 2396, IM (E)
33. Joanna Dworakowska (POL), 2395, IM (E)
34. Irina Slavina (RUS), 2395, IM (E)
35. Natalija Pogonina (RUS), 2393, WIM (E)
36. Wang Yu (CHN), 2393, WGM (Z3.5)
37. Nino Khurtsidze (GEO), 2387, IM (E)
38. Lilit Mkrtchian (ARM), 2387, IM (E)
39. Tatjana Vasilevich (UKR), 2386, IM (E)
40. Elisabeth Pähtz (GER), 2385, WGM (E)
41. Elena Sedina (ITA), 2382, IM (E)
42. Lela Javakhishvili (GEO), 2372, WGM (E)
43. Dronavalli Harika (IND), 2368, WIM (AS)
44. Ana Matnadze (GEO), 2364, WGM (E)
45. Nguyen Thi Thanh An (VIE), 2353, WIM (Z3.3)
46. Rusudan Goletiani (USA), 2352, WGM (AM)
47. Subbaraman Meenakshi (IND), 2344, WIM (Z3.2)
48. Lê Kiều Thiên Kim (VIE), 2341, WIM (Z3.3)
49. Huang Qian (CHN), 2339, WIM (Z3.5)
50. Jennifer Shahade (USA), 2337, WIM (Z2.1)
51. Jana Jacková (CZE), 2331, WGM (E)
52. Maritza Arribas (CUB), 2327, WGM (Z2.3)
53. Carolina Lujan (ARG), 2319, WIM (Z2.5)
54. Maria Sergeyeva (KAZ), 2319, WGM (Z3.6)
55. Svetlana Petrenko (MDA), 2319, WGM (E)
56. Sopio Tkeshelashvili (GEO), 2307, WGM (E)
57. Shadi Paridar (IRI), 2265, WIM (Z3.1)
58. Tan Zhongyi (CHN), 2250 (Z3.5)
59. Anna Hahn (USA), 2218, WIM (Z2.1)
60. Luciana Morales Mendoza (PER), 2120 WIM (Z2.4)
61. Asma Houli (ALG), 2116 (AF)
62. Farida Arouche (ALG), 2114, WIM (AF)
63. Dinara Khaziyeva (CAN), 2110, WFM (Z2.2)
64. Cecile van der Merwe (RSA), 2062, WIM (AF)

Notable top players not taking part was Judit Polgár (ranked the no. 1 woman in the world - and 9th overall), Xie Jun (ranked 2nd), Zhu Chen (8th), Qin Kanying (14th), Inna Gaponenko (18th) and Sofia Polgar (19th).

Notably, this was the second Women's World Championship in a row in which the reigning champion (in this case Zhu Chen) did not attempt to defend their title.

=== Qualification paths ===
- WC: Runner-up and semifinalists of Women's World Chess Championship 2001 (3)
- J: World Junior Champion 2002
- R: Rating (average rating of July 2002 and January 2003 rating list was used) (6)
- E: European Individual Championships 2002 and 2003 (29)
- AM: American Continental Chess Championship 2003
- AS: Asian Chess Championship 2003 (3)
- AF: African Chess Championship 2003 (3)
- Z2.1 (3), Z2.2, Z2.3, Z2.4, Z2.5, Z3.1, Z3.2, Z3.3 (2), Z3.5 (4), Z3.6: Zonal tournaments
- PN: FIDE President nominee (2)

== Results ==
=== Final Match ===
No fourth game was played, as Stefanova led with two points.

Women's World Chess Championship Final 2004
	1	2	3	4	Total
Ekaterina Kovalevskaya (Russia)	0	0	½	—	½
Antoaneta Stefanova (Bulgaria)	1	1	½	—	2½

=== Bracket ===
1st Round
1	Humpy Koneru	2
64	Cecile van der Merwe	0
32	Peng Zhaoqin	4
33	Joanna Dworakowska	3
16	Tatiana Kosintseva	2½
49	Huang Qian	1½
17	Hoang Thanh Trang	1½
48	Lê Kiều Thiên Kim	½
8	Zhao Xue	2
57	Shadi Paridar	0
25	Wang Pin	0
40	Elisabeth Pähtz	2
9	Xu Yuhua	3
56	Sopio Tkeshelashvili	1
24	Elina Danielian	2½
41	Elena Sedina	1½
4	Svetlana Matveeva	2
61	Asma Houli	0
29	Natasa Bojkovic	1½
36	Wang Yu	½
13	Irina Krush	1½
52	Maritza Arribas	½
20	Ketino Kachiani-Gersinska	3½
45	Nguyen Thi Thanh An	3½
5	Kateryna Lahno	1½
60	Luciana Morales Mendoza	½
28	Ekaterina Polovnikova	1½
37	Nino Khurtsidze	½
12	Ekaterina Kovalevskaya	2
53	Carolina Lujan	0
21	Olga Alexandrova	1½
44	Ana Matnadze	½
2	Alisa Galliamova	2
63	Dinara Khaziyeva	0
31	Maia Lomineishvili	1½
34	Irina Slavina-Turova	½
15	Nana Dzagnidze	1½
50	Jennifer Shahade	½
18	Iweta Radziewicz	1½
47	Subbaraman Meenakshi	½
7	Antoaneta Stefanova	2
58	Tan Zhongyi	0
26	Xu Yuanyuan	3
39	Tatjana Vasilevich	4
10	Natalia Zhukova	2½
55	Svetlana Petrenko	1½
23	Nadezhda Kosintseva	3
42	Lela Javakhishvili	1
3	Maia Chiburdanidze	1½
62	Farida Arouche	½
30	Marie Sebag	1½
35	Natalija Pogonina	½
14	Almira Skripchenko	½
51	Jana Jacková	1½
19	Corina-Isabela Peptan	1½
46	Rusudan Goletiani	½
6	Pia Cramling	1½
59	Anna Hahn	½
27	Monika Soćko	3
38	Lilit Mkrtchian	4
11	Alexandra Kosteniuk	2
59	Maria Sergeyeva	0
22	Viktorija Čmilytė	2
43	Dronavalli Harika	0

2nd Round
1	Humpy Koneru	1½
32	Peng Zhaoqin	½
16	Tatiana Kosintseva	1½
17	Hoang Thanh Trang	½
8	Zhao Xue	1½
40	Elisabeth Pähtz	2½
9	Xu Yuhua	1½
24	Elina Danielian	½
4	Svetlana Matveeva	1½
29	Natasa Bojkovic	2½
13	Irina Krush	½
20	Ketino Kachiani-Gersinska	1½
5	Kateryna Lahno	4
28	Ekaterina Polovnikova	3
12	Ekaterina Kovalevskaya	1½
21	Olga Alexandrova	½
2	Alisa Galliamova	0
31	Maia Lomineishvili	2
15	Nana Dzagnidze	1½
18	Iweta Radziewicz	½
7	Antoaneta Stefanova	3½
39	Tatjana Vasilevich	2½
10	Natalia Zhukova	4
23	Nadezhda Kosintseva	3
3	Maia Chiburdanidze	2
30	Marie Sebag	0
51	Jana Jacková	1½
19	Corina-Isabela Peptan	½
6	Pia Cramling	1½
38	Lilit Mkrtchian	½
11	Alexandra Kosteniuk	½
22	Viktorija Čmilytė	1½

3rd Round
1	(India) Humpy Koneru	3
16	(Russia) Tatiana Kosintseva	1
40	(Germany) Elisabeth Pähtz	½
9	(China) Xu Yuhua	1½
29	(Serbia) Natasa Bojkovic	½
20	(Germany) Ketino Kachiani-Gersinska	1½
5	(Ukraine) Kateryna Lahno	1½
12	(Russia) Ekaterina Kovalevskaya	2½
31	(Georgia (country)) Maia Lomineishvili	0
15	(Georgia (country)) Nana Dzagnidze	2
7	(Bulgaria) Antoaneta Stefanova	3
10	(Ukraine) Natalia Zhukova	1
3	(Georgia (country)) Maia Chiburdanidze	1½
51	(Czech Republic) Jana Jacková	½
6	(Sweden) Pia Cramling	2
22	(Lithuania) Viktorija Čmilytė	4

Quarterfinals
1	(India) Humpy Koneru	2
9	(China) Xu Yuhua	0
20	(Germany) Ketino Kachiani-Gersinska	1½
12	(Russia) Ekaterina Kovalevskaya	2½
15	(Georgia (country)) Nana Dzagnidze	1½
7	(Bulgaria) Antoaneta Stefanova	2½
3	(Georgia (country)) Maia Chiburdanidze	3½
22	(Lithuania) Viktorija Čmilytė	2½

Semifinals
1	(India) Humpy Koneru	1½
12	(Russia) Ekaterina Kovalevskaya	2½
7	(Bulgaria) Antoaneta Stefanova	1½
3	(Georgia (country)) Maia Chiburdanidze	½

Finals
12	(Russia) Ekaterina Kovalevskaya	½
7	(Bulgaria) Antoaneta Stefanova	2½
