= Women's World Chess Championship 2000 =

The Women's World Chess Championship 2000 was a change from previous championship cycle in that, for the first time, it consisted of a 64-player knock-out tournament which took place from November 27 to December 16, 2000 in New Delhi, India. Despite the change in format, the tournament was still won by defending champion Xie Jun of China, who beat her compatriot Qin Kanying in the final by 2½ to 1½.

== Participants ==
This is the list of participants, ranked according to their Elo ratings on the October 2000 list. Due to a few late withdrawals, the final number of competitors was only 61.

1. Xie Jun (CHN), 2567, GM
2. Maia Chiburdanidze (GEO), 2550, GM
3. Alisa Galliamova (RUS), 2550, IM
4. Zhu Chen (CHN), 2534, WGM
5. Xu Yuhua (CHN), 2507, WFM
6. Pia Cramling (SWE), 2505, GM
7. Nana Ioseliani (GEO), 2500, IM
8. Hoang Thanh Trang (VIE), 2493, IM
9. Qin Kanying (CHN), 2484, WGM
10. Wang Lei (CHN), 2483, WGM
11. Ekaterina Kovalevskaya (RUS), 2468, WGM
12. Natalia Zhukova (UKR), 2467, WGM
13. Almira Skripchenko (MDA), 2451, IM
14. Anna Zatonskih (UKR), 2446, WGM
15. Ketino Kachiani-Gersinska (GER), 2444, IM
16. Svetlana Matveeva (RUS), 2440, WGM
17. Corina Peptan (ROM), 2439, IM
18. Alisa Marić (SCG), 2435, IM
19. Nino Khurtsidze (GEO), 2432, IM
20. Nataša Bojković (SCG), 2429, WGM
21. Tatjana Vasilevich (UKR), 2420, WGM
22. Ketevan Arakhamia-Grant (GEO), 2414, IM
23. Peng Zhaoqin (NED), 2413, IM
24. Subbaraman Vijayalakshmi (IND), 2402, WIM
25. Nona Gaprindashvili (GEO), 2390, GM
26. Maria Manakova (SCG), 2384, WGM
27. Irina Krush (USA), 2378, WGM
28. Nino Gurieli (GEO), 2373, IM
29. Julia Demina (RUS), 2366, WGM
30. Elena Zayac (RUS), 2359, WGM
31. Viktorija Čmilytė (LIT), 2352, IM
32. Masha Klinova (ISR), 2350, WGM
33. Joanna Dworakowska (POL), 2347, WGM
34. Rakhil Eidelson (BLR), 2345, WGM
35. Nikoletta Lakos (HUN), 2337, WGM
36. Olga Stjazhkina (RUS), 2337, WGM
37. Rusudan Goletiani (GEO), 2324, WGM
38. Genrieta Lagvilava (BLR), 2318, WGM
39. Erika Sziva (NED), 2307, WIM
40. Lela Javakhishvili (GEO), 2296, WIM
41. Dana Reizniece (LAT), 2285, WGM
42. Mónica Calzetta (ESP), 2282, WIM
43. Nguyen Thi Thanh An (VIE), 2281
44. Ella Pitam (ISR), 2279, WGM
45. Sopio Tkeshelashvili (GEO), 2274, WIM
46. Subbaraman Meenakshi (IND), 2260
47. Anna Hahn (USA), 2255, WIM
48. Inga Khurtsilava (GEO), 2243, WIM
49. Bagyashree Thipsay (IND), 2234, WIM
50. Niina Koskela (FIN), 2226
51. Jennifer Shahade (USA), 2222
52. Johanne Charest (CAN), 2136, WIM
53. Marany Meyer (RSA), 2087
54. Geraldine Johns-Putra (AUS), 2065, WFM
55. Joara Chaves (BRA), 2057, WIM
56. Marta Zielińska (POL), 2054
57. Claudia Amura (ARG), WGM
58. Maritza Arribas (CUB), WGM
59. Fliura Uskova (KAZ), WIM
60. Zahira El Ghabi (MAR), WFM
61. Asma Houli (ALG)

Notable top players not taking part were Judit Polgár (ranked the no. 1 woman in the world), Wang Pin (ranked 7th), Antoaneta Stefanova (11th), Sofia Polgar (14th), and Harriet Hunt (18th).

As Women's World Champion, Xie Jun was invited to participate in the concurrent open event, but chose to try to defend her title instead.

== Results ==
=== Final match ===
Women's World Championship Final 2000
	Rating	1	2	3	4	Total
Qin Kanying (China)	2484	0	½	½	½	1½
Xie Jun (China)	2567	1	½	½	½	2½

=== Bracket ===
1st Round
1	Xie Jun
bye
16	Svetlana Matveeva	1½
58	Fliura Uskova	½
30	Elena Zayac	1½
45	Subbaraman Meenakshi	½
6	Pia Cramling	4
35	Nikoletta Lakos	3
12	Natalia Zhukova	1½
39	Erika Sziva	½
33	Joanna Dworakowska	1
53	Geraldine Johns-Putra	0
5	Xu Yuhua	1½
56	Claudia Amura	½
46	Anna Hahn	2
19	Nino Khurtsidze	0
11	Ekaterina Kovalevskaya	1
44	Ella Pitam	0
55	Marta Zielińska	2
51	Johanne Charest	0
21	Tatjana Vasilevich	2
43	Nguyen Thi Thanh An	0
27	Irina Krush	1½
4	Zhu Chen	½
23	Peng Zhaoqin	4
48	Bagyashree Thipsay	3
10	Wang Lei	3½
36	Olga Stjazhkina	2½
29	Julia Demina	2
59	Zahira El Ghabi	0
57	Maritza Arribas	4½
14	Anna Zatonskih	3½
9	Qin Kanying	2½
32	Masha Klinova	1½
22	Ketevan Arakhamia-Grant	2
50	Jennifer Shahade	0
15	Ketino Kachiani-Gersinska	1½
40	Lela Javakhishvili	½
26	Maria Manakova	2
54	Joara Chaves	0
17	Corina Peptan	2
42	Mónica Calzetta	0
2	Maia Chiburdanidze
bye
7	Nana Ioseliani	1
37	Rusudan Goletiani	0
49	Niina Koskela	2
24	Subbaraman Vijayalakshmi	0
18	Alisa Marić	1½
61	Sopio Tkeshelashvili	½
34	Rakhil Eidelson	1½
60	Asma Houli	½
31	Viktorija Čmilytė	2
8	Hoang Thanh Trang	0
47	Inga Khurtsilava	2
25	Nona Gaprindashvili	0
13	Almira Skripchenko	2
38	Genrieta Lagvilava	0
52	Marany Meyer	1½
28	Nino Gurieli	½
3	Alisa Galliamova
bye
20	Nataša Bojković	2
41	Dana Reizniece	0

2nd Round
Xie Jun	2½
Svetlana Matveeva	1½
Elena Zayac	1½
Pia Cramling	½
Natalia Zhukova	2
Joanna Dworakowska	0
Xu Yuhua	1½
Anna Hahn	½
Ekaterina Kovalevskaya	1½
Marta Zielińska	½
Tatjana Vasilevich	1½
Irina Krush	½
Peng Zhaoqin	1½
Wang Lei	½
Julia Demina	4
Maritza Arribas	3
Qin Kanying	1½
Ketevan Arakhamia-Grant	½
Ketino Kachiani-Gersinska	0
Maria Manakova	0
Corina Peptan	1½
Maia Chiburdanidze	½
Nana Ioseliani	1½
Niina Koskela	½
Alisa Marić	1½
Rakhil Eidelson	½
Viktorija Čmilytė	1½
Inga Khurtsilava	½
Almira Skripchenko	1½
Marany Meyer	½
Alisa Galliamova	2½
Nataša Bojković	1½

3rd Round
Xie Jun	1½
Elena Zayac	½
Natalia Zhukova	2½
Xu Yuhua	1½
Ekaterina Kovalevskaya	1½
Tatjana Vasilevich	½
Peng Zhaoqin	2
Julia Demina	0
Qin Kanying	1½
Ketino Kachiani-Gersinska	½
Corina Peptan	1½
Nana Ioseliani	½
Alisa Marić	1½
Viktorija Čmilytė	½
Almira Skripchenko	2½
Alisa Galliamova	1½

Quarterfinals
Xie Jun	1½
Natalia Zhukova	½
Ekaterina Kovalevskaya	1½
Peng Zhaoqin	½
Qin Kanying	3
Corina Peptan	1
Alisa Marić	3
Almira Skripchenko	1

Semifinals
Xie Jun	2½
Ekaterina Kovalevskaya	1½
Qin Kanying	1½
Alisa Marić	½

Finals
Xie Jun	2½
Qin Kanying	1½
