= Styazhkina =

Styazhkina, or Stjazkhkina, is a Cyrillic surname. Notable people so named include:

- Anna Styazhkina (born 1997), Russian chess player
  - Viacheslav Styazhkina, her father, also a chess player, covered at Anna Styazhkina
- Olga Stjazhkina (born 1970), Russian chess player
- Tetyana Styazhkina (born 1977), Ukrainian cyclist
