= Marina Manakov =

German chess player (born 1969)

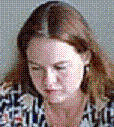
- Marina Manakov in 1997

Personal information
- Born: 17 April 1969 (age 57)

Chess career
- Country: Soviet Union (until 1991); Germany (from 1992)
- Title: Woman International Master (1995)
- Peak rating: 2345 (July 1998)

Marina Manakov (née Sokolova, later Olbrich, born 17 April 1969) is a German chess Woman International Master (WIM, 1995) of Russian origin who won Open German Women's Chess Championship (1992) and German Women's Chess Championship (1993, 1995).

== Life ==
She learned to play chess from her parents at the age of four. Her father was a chess coach at a university in Moscow, her mother was a chess coach in a chess club. Marina Manakov (then Marina Sokolova) graduated from the State University of Physical Culture in Moscow in 1991 with honors in the subjects of sports and chess. She is also active as a chess teacher, for example in clubs as well as for the Oberschulamt Stuttgart, the Chess Tigers University in Deizisau and schools in Miesbach-Parsberg.

== Chess career ==
In 1988 she received the Soviet National Women Master title, since 1995 she has held the title of Woman International Master (WIM). Manakov is listed as inactive at FIDE because she last played rated games in December 2013 in the Chess Women's Bundesliga Season 2013/14.

=== Women's Zonal Tournaments ===
She finished 5th in the 1995 Women's World Chess Championship Zonal tournament in Ptuj, which was won by Ketino Kachiani-Gersinska, and 4th in the 1998 Women's World Chess Championship Zonal tournament in Dresden, The winner was Masha Klinova.

=== German Women's Championships ===
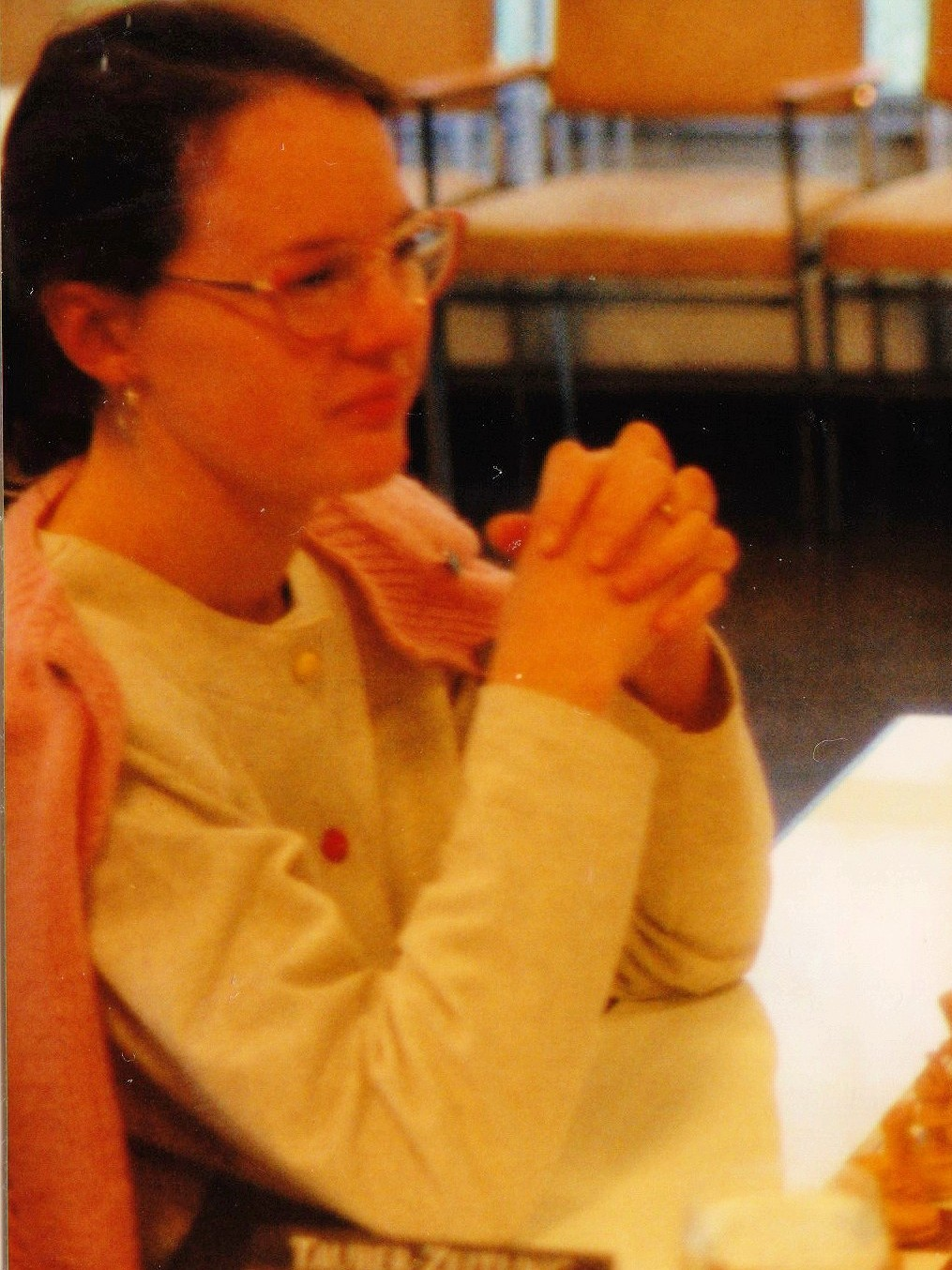
Marina in Germany Women's Chess Championship in 1993

In 1992 she won the Open German Women's Chess Championship in Bad Neustadt an der Saale. The German Women's Chess Championship she won in 1993 in Bad Mergentheim and in 1997 in the Landesakademie for musical and cultural education in Ottweiler. Twice she took second place at the German Women's Rapid Chess Championships: at the first women's rapid chess championship in 1993 in Herdorf behind Gisela Fischdick and 1997 in Bensheim-Auerbach behind Annemarie Sylvia Meier. She won the German Women's Blitz Championships five times: 1997, 2000, 2003 in Brakel, 2005 in the Amadeus hall of the Kurhaus in Bad Lauterberg and 2006 in Herrnsheim Castle in Worms-Herrnsheim.

=== National team ===
For the German women's national team she played in three Chess Women's Olympiad with a positive overall result of 19 points from 31 games (+14, =10, −7): 1994 in Moscow on the first reserve board, 1996 in Yerevan on the third board and 1998 in Elista on the second board. At the European Team Chess Women's Championship in 1997 in Pula, she also played second board.

=== Clubs ===
In Germany she played from district class to 2nd Chess Bundesliga and in the Chess Women's Bundesliga for various clubs. In the Chess Women's Bundesliga she played in the seasons 1991/92 and 1993/94 for the SC 1974 Bessenbach, from 1994 to 1997 for the Elberfelder Schachgesellschaft 1851, with which she won Chess Women's Bundesliga 1996 and Chess Women's Bundesliga 1997 and took part in the European Chess Club Cup for women, in the 1997/98 season for the SSV Vimaria Weimar '91, from 1999 to 2001 for the Karlsruher Schachfreunde, in the 2001/02 season for the Stuttgarter Schachfreunde 1879, in the 2006/07 season for SV Wolfbusch and from 2012 to 2014 for SF Deizisau. Other clubs to which she belonged are the TV 1884 Marktheidenfeld, the Schachclub Kitzingen, the SC Murrhardt and since 2014 the TV Tegernsee.

== Publications ==
- with Henryk Dobosz: Candidate final '93 Short–Timman. Chess publisher Olbrich, Würzburg 1993.
