= Johanne Charest =

Canadian chess player (born 1975)

Personal information
- Born: 9 February 1975 (age 51)

Chess career
- Country: Canada
- Title: Woman International Master (1997)
- Peak rating: 2145 (January 1997)

Johanne Charest (born 9 February 1975) is a Canadian chess player who holds the FIDE title of Woman International Master (WIM, 1996). She is a Canadian Women's Chess Championship winner (1996).

In the late 1990s and early 2000s, Charest was one of Canada leading chess players. In 1996, she won Canadian Women's Chess Championship. In 2000, Johanne Charest participated in Women's World Chess Championship by knock-out system and in the first round lost to Marta Zielińska.

Johanne Charest played for Canada in the Women's Chess Olympiad:

- In 2000, at first board in the 34th Chess Olympiad (women) in Istanbul (+3, =2, -5).

In 1996, she was awarded the FIDE Woman International Master (WIM) title.
