= Macedonian Chess Championship =

The Macedonian Chess Championship is organized by the Chess Federation of Macedonia. It was last held in 2011, although the Macedonian Open Chess Championship, which is also open to foreign players, continues to be organized annually.

== Pre-independence history ==
The Socialist Republic of Macedonia held its first chess championship in 1946, which was won by Pavle Bidev, a four-time winner between 1946 and 1955. Jovan Sofrevski won a record sixteen titles, and Risto Nicevski became the youngest winner at 20 years old when he won the 1966 championship; he won five titles in total.

== National championship winners ==
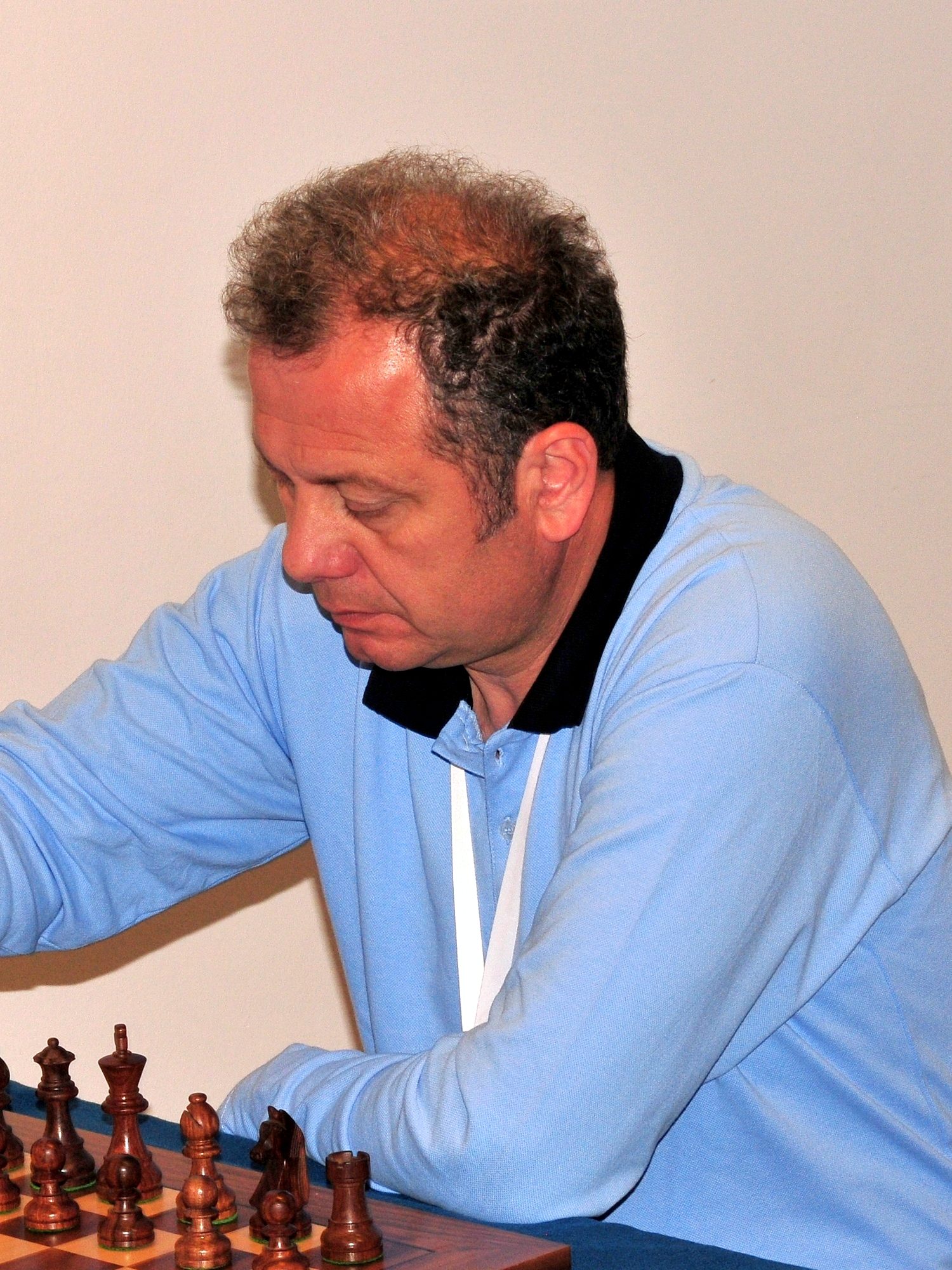
Zvonko Stanojoski, Macedonian champion in 1992, 2003, 2005 and 2006

Year	Champion
1992	Zvonko Stanojoski
1993	Vlatko Bogdanovski
1994	Rolando Kutirov
1995	Vlatko Bogdanovski
1996	Dragoljub Jacimović
1997	Trajče Nedev
1998	Dragoljub Jacimovic
1999	Toni Kiroski
2000	Trajče Nedev
2001	Vanco Stamenkov
2002	Nikola Mitkov
2003	Zvonko Stanojoski
2004	Nikola Vasovski
2005	Zvonko Stanojoski
2006	Zvonko Stanojoski
2007	Vladimir Georgiev
2008	Riste Menkinoski
2009	Vlatko Bogdanovski
2010	Filip Pančevski
2011	Trajče Nedev
2024	Toni Lazov

== Women's championship winners ==
No.	Year	Champion
1	2008	Gabriela Koskoska
2	2011	Gabriela Koskoska
3	2024	Gabriela Koskoska
