= Marany Meyer =

New Zealand chess player

Personal information
- Born: 5 April 1984 (age 42)

Chess career
- Country: South Africa; New Zealand
- Title: Woman International Master (2001)
- Peak rating: 2161 (January 2002)

Marany Meyer (born 5 April 1984) is a South African and New Zealand (since 2009) chess Woman International Master.

== Biography ==
In 2000, Marany Meyer won the South African Youth Chess Championship for girls. She represented South Africa at the World Youth Chess Championships in different age groups. In 2000, Marany Meyer participated in Women's World Chess Championship by knock-out system and in the first round sensational won to Nino Gurieli but in the second round lost to Almira Skripchenko. Later Marany Meyer moved to New Zealand and since 2009 she has been representing this country in chess tournaments.

Marany Meyer played for South Africa and New Zealand in the Women's Chess Olympiads:

- In 2000, for South Africa, at second board in the 34th Chess Olympiad (women) in Istanbul (+4, =2, -5),
- In 2012, for New Zealand at reserve board in the 40th Chess Olympiad (women) in Istanbul (+4, =2, -3),
- In 2014, for New Zealand, at second board in the 41st Chess Olympiad (women) in Tromsø (+4, =2, -3).
