= Genrieta Lagvilava =

Belarusian chess player

Personal information
- Born: 3 July 1969 (age 57) Kutaisi, Georgia

Chess career
- Country: Georgia; Belarus
- Title: Woman Grandmaster (2000)
- Peak rating: 2336 (January 2000)

Genrieta Lagvilava (born 3 July 1969) is a Georgia-born Belarusian chess player who holds the FIDE title of Woman Grandmaster (WGM, 2000).

== Biography ==
In 1984, Lagvilava won Georgian Women's Chess Championship, but in 1986, she won USSR Youth Chess Championship. After dissolution of the Soviet Union Genrieta Lagvilava has become one of the leading Belarusian chess players. Participant of many Belarusian Women's Chess Championships where she won silver (2002) and two bronze (2001, 2004) medals.

In the 2000s, she participated in Women's World Chess Championship by knock-out system:

- In Women's World Chess Championship 2000 in the first round lost to Almira Skripchenko,
- In Women's World Chess Championship 2001 in the first round lost to Inna Gaponenko.

Lagvilava played for Belarus in the Women's Chess Olympiads:

- In 1994, at first reserve board in the 31st Chess Olympiad (women) in Moscow (+4, =3, -3),
- In 1996, at second board in the 32nd Chess Olympiad (women) in Yerevan (+7, =2, -3),
- In 1998, at second board in the 33rd Chess Olympiad (women) in Elista (+3, =4, -4),
- In 2000, at second board in the 34th Chess Olympiad (women) in Istanbul (+5, =4, -2),
- In 2002, at first board in the 35th Chess Olympiad (women) in Bled (+3, =6, -2),
- In 2004, at first board in the 36th Chess Olympiad (women) in Calvià (+4, =1, -6).

She played for Belarus in the European Team Chess Championships:

- In 2001, at first board in the 4th European Team Chess Championship (women) in León (+2, =1, -4).

In 1995, Lagvilava was awarded the FIDE Woman International Master (WIM) title and received the FIDE Woman Grandmaster (WGM) title five year later.
