= Geraldine Johns-Putra =

Australian chess player

Personal information
- Born: 1973 (age 52–53)

Chess career
- Country: Malaysia; Australia
- Title: Woman FIDE Master (2000)
- Peak rating: 2065 (January 2000)

Geraldine Johns-Putra (born 1973) is a Malaysian and Australian Woman FIDE Master (WFM) (2000).

== Biography ==
In 1999, in Gold Coast Geraldine Johns-Putra shared 2nd-3rd place in Women's World Chess Championship Oceania Zonal tournament. In 2000, Geraldine Johns-Putra participated in Women's World Chess Championship by knock-out system and in the first round lost to Joanna Dworakowska.

Geraldine Johns-Putra played for Malaysia in the Women's Chess Olympiads:

- In 1998, at third board in the 33rd Chess Olympiad (women) in Elista (+7, =2, -4),
- In 2000, at second board in the 34th Chess Olympiad (women) in Istanbul (+3, =5, -4),
- In 2002, at third board in the 35th Chess Olympiad (women) in Bled (+4, =3, -4).
