= Anna Hahn =

Anna Hahn may refer to:

- Anna Marie Hahn (1906–1938), German-American murderer
- Anna Hahn (chess player) (born 1976), Latvian-American chess player
