= Masha Klinova =

Israeli chess player (born 1968)

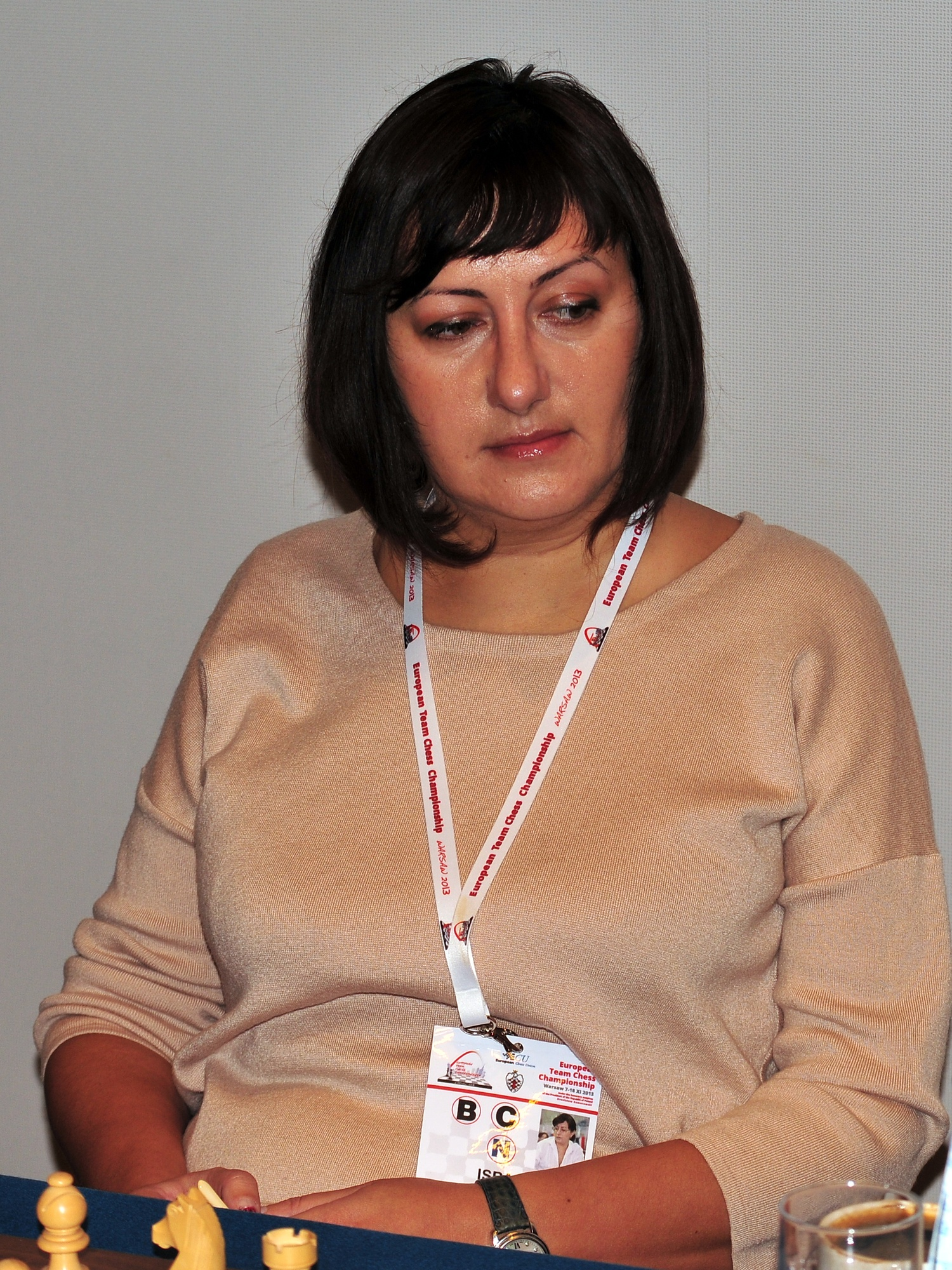
- Klinova in 2013

Personal information
- Native name: מאשה קלינובה
- Born: 18 November 1968 (age 57)

Chess career
- Country: Israel
- Title: International Master (2002); Woman Grandmaster (1996)
- FIDE rating: 2255 (December 2021)
- Peak rating: 2436 (April 2004)

Masha Klinova (Hebrew: מאשה קלינובה; née Jarmolinskaya, born 18 November 1968) is an Israeli chess player who holds the FIDE title of Woman Grandmaster (WGM, 1996). She is a two-timeswinner of Israeli Women's Chess Championship (1992, 2010).

== Biography ==
Klinova was born in the Soviet Union, but in 1992 moved to Israel. She twice won Israeli Women's Chess Championships: in 1992 and in 2010. Also she twice won Women's World Chess Championship Zonal tournaments: in 1993, in Zagreb and in 1998, in Dresden (together with Ela Pitam). In 2000, Klinova participated in Women's World Chess Championship by knock-out system and in the first round lost to Qin Kanying.

She is winner of many international chess tournaments, including the shared first place with Ilze Rubene in 1999, in Stockholm Scandics Hotels tournament, shared the first place in 2001, in Odessa, won in Simferopol, in 2003, won in Sevastopol, in 2005, but in 2008 won the second place in the tournament in Kherson.

Klinova played for Israel in the Women's Chess Olympiads:

- In 1994, at first board in the 31st Chess Olympiad (women) in Moscow (+5, =2, −5),
- In 1996, at first board in the 32nd Chess Olympiad (women) in Yerevan (+2, =7, −2),
- In 1998, at first board in the 33rd Chess Olympiad (women) in Elista (+4, =7, −1),
- In 2000, at first board in the 34th Chess Olympiad (women) in Istanbul (+3, =7, −2),
- In 2002, at first board in the 35th Chess Olympiad (women) in Bled (+5, =6, −2),
- In 2006, at first board in the 37th Chess Olympiad (women) in Turin (+3, =7, −2),
- In 2008, at first board in the 38th Chess Olympiad (women) in Dresden (+2, =5, −2),
- In 2010, at first board in the 39th Chess Olympiad (women) in Khanty-Mansiysk (+2, =4, −3),
- In 2012, at third board in the 40th Chess Olympiad (women) in Istanbul (+4, =4, −1),
- In 2014, at first board in the 41st Chess Olympiad (women) in Tromsø (+3, =5, −2),
- In 2016, at third board in the 42nd Chess Olympiad (women) in Baku (+2, =4, −2),
- In 2018, at third board in the 43rd Chess Olympiad (women) in Batumi (+2, =3, −3).

She played for Israel in the European Team Chess Championships:

- In 1992, at first board in the 1st European Team Chess Championship (women) in Debrecen (+2, =2, −2),
- In 1997, at first board in the 2nd European Team Chess Championship (women) in Pula (+3, =3, −2),
- In 2003, at first board in the 5th European Team Chess Championship (women) in Plovdiv (+2, =4, −2),
- In 2005, at first board in the 6th European Team Chess Championship (women) in Gothenburg (+0, =5, −4),
- In 2007, at first board in the 7th European Team Chess Championship (women) in Heraklion (+1, =6, −2),
- In 2011, at first board in the 9th European Team Chess Championship (women) in Porto Carras (+1, =4, −1),
- In 2013, at second board in the 10th European Team Chess Championship (women) in Warsaw (+3, =3, −1),
- In 2017, at third board in the 12th European Team Chess Championship (women) in Crete (+2, =4, −1).

Klinova received the FIDE Woman Grandmaster (WGM) title in 1996 and the FIDE International Master (IM) title in 2002. She is also an FIDE Trainer (2011), FIDE Arbiter (2012), and International Arbiter (2014).
