= Ana Matnadze =

Georgian-Spanish chess player (born 1983)

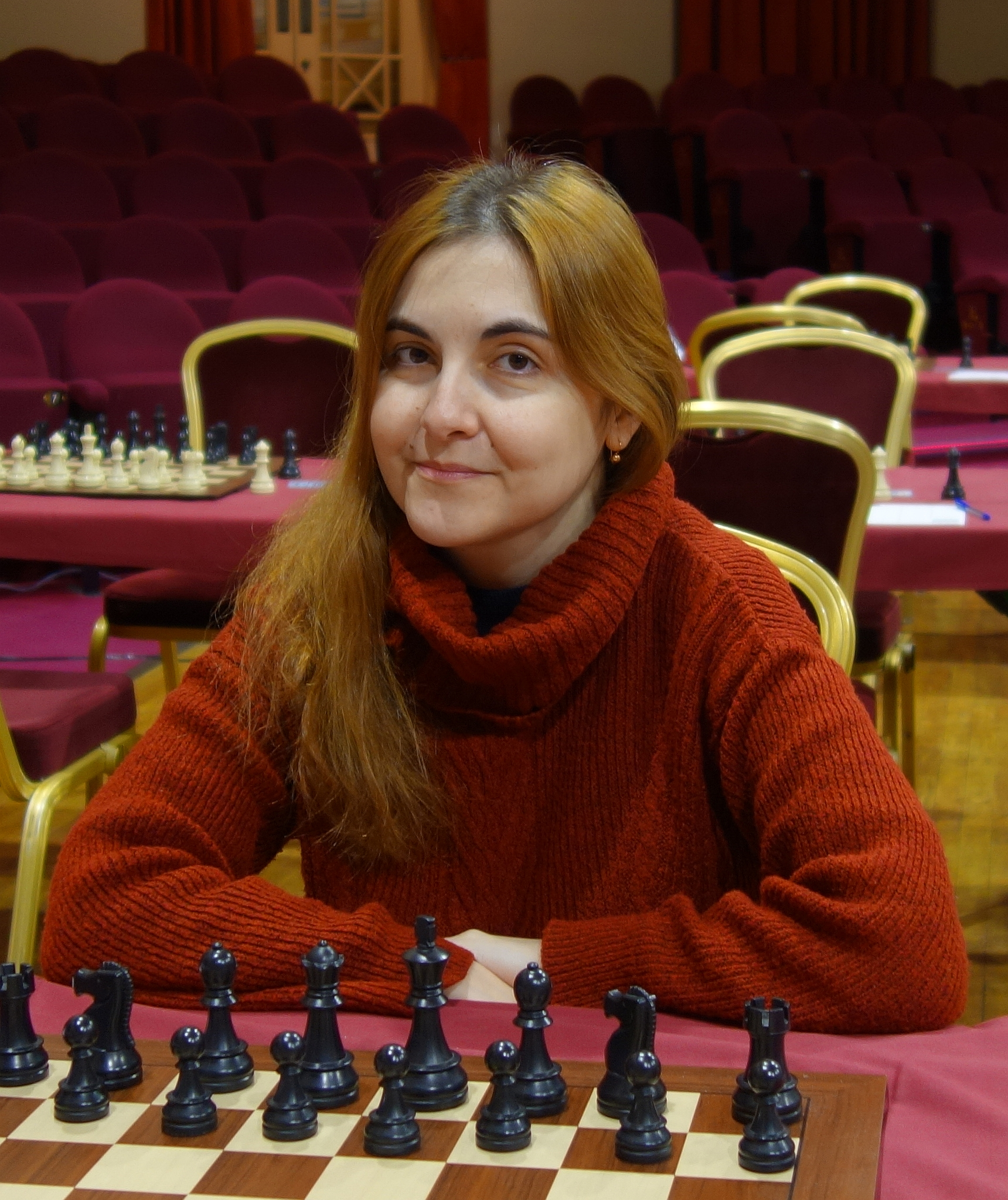
- Matnadze in 2023

Personal information
- Born: 20 February 1983 (age 43) Telavi, Georgian SSR, Soviet Union

Chess career
- Country: Georgia (until 2012); Spain (since 2012)
- Title: International Master (2006); Woman Grandmaster (2002)
- Peak rating: 2447 (January 2012)

Ana Matnadze (Georgian: ანა მათნაძე; born 20 February 1983) is a Georgian-Spanish chess player. FIDE awarded her the titles Woman Grandmaster (WGM), in 2002, and International Master (IM), in 2006. Matnadze was European and world girls champion in her age category.

== Chess career ==
Matnadze was introduced to chess at the age of four by her mother. She was trained by Grandmaster Nona Gaprindashvili, amongst others. She won the Georgian girls' championship in her age group four times (in 1992, 1993, 1994 and 1998). She won the European Youth Chess Championships in her age girls group five times, in Băile Herculane 1994, Verdun 1995, Tallinn 1997, Mureck 1998, and Litochoro 1999. Matnadze also won the World Youth Chess Championships twice, in the Girls U10 category in 1993 and in the Girls U14 in 1997.

Matnadze finished second, behind Regina Pokorná, in the European Junior Girls Championship in Patras 1999, and third, behind Jovanka Houska and Viktorija Cmilyte, in Avilés 2000. She jointly won the Black Sea Countries Women's Championship in Batumi 2000. Together with Maia Lomineishvili, Matnadze jointly won the Georgian Women's Championship in April 2002. In the same year, she won the European Women's Blitz Chess Championship in Antalya.

She played for Georgian teams NTN Tbilisi and Energy-Investi Sakartvelo in the European Club Cup for Women five times from 2002 to 2006. During that time she won two team gold medals and two individual silver (in İzmir 2004 and Saint-Vincent 2005), two team silver (in Rethymno 2003 and Fügen 2006), and the team bronze in Antalya 2002.

In June 2004, she and Lela Javakhishvili published a letter to FIDE, in which they criticized various aspects of the Women's World Chess Championship 2004, leading to a hostile dispute with FIDE Vice-President Zurab Azmaiparashvili. After initially cancelling her participation, Matnadze was later convinced to play in the event, but was eliminated by Olga Alexandrova in round one.

Matnadze moved to Barcelona and won the Catalan Women's Championship in Balaguer in 2006. She has been the women's champion of the Catalan Chess Circuit in 2008, 2009, 2010, and 2011. She won international tournaments in Mondariz-Balneario 2007, Las Palmas 2009, Tancat Sabadell (Women) 2010, and Benidorm (Women) 2011.

In March 2012, Matnadze transferred national federations to represent Spain. Since then she has played on the Spanish team in the Women's Chess Olympiad and in the Women's European Team Chess Championship. In 2018, she won an individual bronze medal playing board three in the Women's Olympiad in Batumi. Matnadze also won individual medals at the Women's European Team Championship in 2013 (silver on board three) and 2017 (bronze on board three).

She is a trainer at the chess club Associació d'Escacs Rubinenca in Barcelona, and in the InterAjedrez Academia. She plays in the teams Peona i Peó in Spain, Annemasse in France, Volksbank Halle in the German Bundesliga, and Ankara Demirspor Kulübü in Turkey. She is also involved in other chess activities in Catalonia.

== Personal life ==
In 2003, Matnadze graduated from the Tbilisi Ivane Javakhishvili State University, Foreign Language and literature department, with a degree in philology (German language and literature). She knows seven languages, Georgian, Spanish, German, English, Russian, Portuguese, and Catalan.

She received the Grantee of the Foundation of the President of Georgia award in 1998 and 2003, and she was a holder of the scholarship stipend established by the President of Georgia in 2001.

Matnadze is dedicated to the support of international charities. she participated in events such as the chess tournament in Tbilisi to help flood victims in Western Georgia (2005), the charity tournament Chess Against Drugs in Tbilisi (2006), the exchange program Chess and Friendship in Georgia and Spain (2006), the exchange program Chess for peace and understanding in Georgia and Spain (2007), and the chess project We Play For Peace in Las Palmas de Gran Canaria (2009). Since 2005, she has been the President of the International Charity Movement Chess – A Peace Ambassador, a non-profit organisation which has already conducted many international chess and charity events.

Matnadze has a fascination with Vampires and is the main character in a book by Miguel Alvarez Morales, AnnA La Vampiresa (Spanish Edition) (2012, ISBN 4-871-87663-2).

She currently lives in Barcelona, Spain.
