= Zahira El Ghabi =

Moroccan chess player

Personal information
- Born: 1981 (age 44–45)

Chess career
- Country: Morocco
- Title: Woman FIDE Master (2005)
- FIDE rating: 2029 (April 2006)
- Peak rating: 2039 (January 2005)

Zahira El Ghabi (Arabic: زهيرة الغابي) is a Moroccan Woman FIDE master (WFM, 2005).

== Chess career ==
In the early 2000s, she was one of the leading Moroccan chess players. In 2000, Zahira El Ghabi participated in Women's World Chess Championship by knock-out system and in the first round lost to Julia Demina.

Zahira El Ghabi played for Morocco in the Women's Chess Olympiads:

- In 2000, at first reserve board in the 34th Chess Olympiad (women) in Istanbul (+6, =1, -0) and won individual gold medal.

Since 2006 she rarely participated in chess tournaments.
