= Jacimović =

Jacimović is a Macedonian (Јачимовиќ) and Jaćimović Serbian surname Јаћимовић. Notable people with the surname include:

- Dragoljub Jacimović (born 1964), Macedonian chess grandmaster
- Marko Jaćimović
- Predrag Jaćimović (born 1957), Serbian basketball coach
