= Irina Slavina =

Irina Slavina may refer to:

- Irina Slavina (journalist) (1973–2020), Russian journalist
- Irina Turova (chess player) (born 1979), née Slavina, Russian chess player
