= Ela Pitam =

Israeli chess player (born 1977)

Personal information
- Native name: אֵלָה פִּיתָם
- Born: 10 February 1977 (age 49) Riga, Latvian SSR, Soviet Union

Chess career
- Country: Soviet Union (before 1991); Israel (after 1991)
- Title: Woman Grandmaster (1997)
- Peak rating: 2375 (July 1997)

Ela Pitam (Hebrew: אלה פיטם; born 10 February 1977) is an Israeli chess player who holds the title of Woman Grandmaster (WGM, 1997). She is the winner of the 2000 Israeli Women's Chess Championship.

== Biography ==
Pitam was born in Riga. In 1991, she left the Soviet Union for Israel. She graduated from the University of Haifa.

== Chess career ==
Pitam began to study chess in Latvia. In 1990 she took part in the Open Chess Championship of Latvia. From 1992 to 1997 she participated in the European Youth Chess Championships and World Youth Chess Championships. Her best result was 3rd place in 1994 in the European Girls' Chess Championship U18 in Chania.

In 1998, in Dresden she shared first place with the Women's World Chess Championship zone tournament. Pitam participated in Women's World Chess Championship knock-out tournament in 2000 in New Delhi and lost Ekaterina Kovalevskaya in the 1st round. In 2000 she won the Israeli Women's Chess Championship. In 2001 in Tel-Aviv she shared the third place in the International Women's Chess tournament (won Ildikó Mádl).

Pitam played for Israel in the Women's Chess Olympiads:

- In 1996, at first reserve board in the 32nd Chess Olympiad (women) in Yerevan (+8, =3, -1) and won individual silver medal,
- In 1998, at second board in the 33rd Chess Olympiad (women) in Elista (+4, =7, -1),
- In 2000, at second board in the 34th Chess Olympiad (women) in Istanbul (+4, =2, -5),
- In 2010, at third board in the 39th Chess Olympiad (women) in Khanty-Mansiysk (+3, =1, -3).

Pitam played for Israel in the European Team Chess Championships:

- In 1997, at second board in the 2nd European Team Chess Championship (women) in Pula (+2, =2, -1),
- In 1999, at second board in the 3rd European Team Chess Championship (women) in Batumi (+2, =5, -2),
- In 2009, at third board in the 8th European Team Chess Championship (women) in Novi Sad (+3, =1, -3).

== See also ==
- Sports in Israel
- Women in Israel
