= Sopio Tkeshelashvili =

Georgian chess player (born 1979)

Personal information
- Born: 23 October 1979 (age 46)

Chess career
- Country: Georgia
- Title: Woman Grandmaster (2000)
- FIDE rating: 2269 (December 2017)
- Peak rating: 2321 (January 1999)

Sopio Tkeshelashvili (also spelled Tqeshelashvili; born 23 October 1979) is a Georgian chess player who holds the FIDE title of Woman Grandmaster.

She won the Under-12 girls European Youth Chess Championship in 1991 and the European Junior Girls Championship twice, in 1997 and 1998.

She competed, being eliminated in the first round, in the Women's World Chess Championship 2000 and Women's World Chess Championship 2004.
