= Dinara Khaziyeva =

Canadian chess player (born 1986)

Personal information
- Born: 2 August 1986 (age 39) Almaty, Kazakhstan

Chess career
- Country: Canada
- Title: Woman International Master (2004)
- FIDE rating: 2115 (September 2010)
- Peak rating: 2125 (July 2004)

Dinara Khaziyeva (born 2 August 1986) is a Canadian chess player who holds the FIDE title of Woman International Master (WIM, 2004). She won the Women's Canadian Chess Championship in 2004.

She lives in Vancouver, British Columbia, Canada as a real estate agent and also has a residence in Montreal, Quebec, Canada. She is married to Canadian chess player Emmanuel Desmarais.

== Biography ==
In 2000, Khaziyeva represented Canada at the World Girls' Junior Chess Championship, which she ranked in 28th place. In 2004, she won Women's Canadian Chess Championship which also was Women's World Chess Championship American Zonal 2.1 tournament, and qualified for the Women's World Chess Championship. In 2004, Khaziyeva participated in Women's World Chess Championship by knock-out system and in the first round lost to Alisa Galliamova.

Khaziyeva played for Canada in the Women's Chess Olympiads:

- In 2002, at third board in the 35th Chess Olympiad (women) in Bled (+2, =4, -4),
- In 2004, at second board in the 36th Chess Olympiad (women) in Calvià (+8, =1, -3),
- In 2006, at third board in the 37th Chess Olympiad (women) in Turin (+4, =3, -3).

In 2004, she was awarded the FIDE Woman International Master (WIM) title. Khaziyeva also plays poker; her largest live cash game winnings were $55,283.
