= Jana Jacková =

Czech chess player (born 1982)

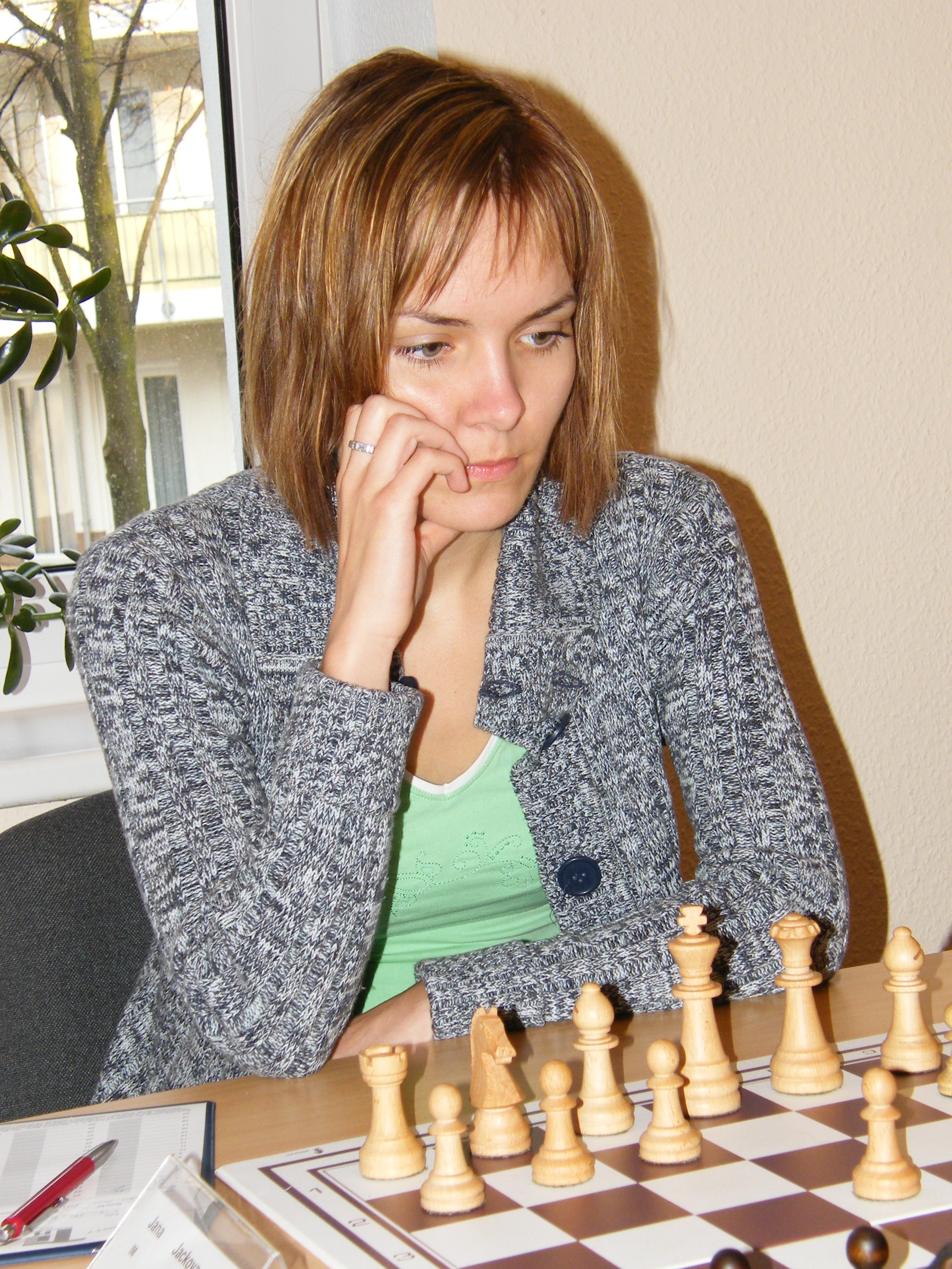

Personal information
- Born: August 6, 1982 (age 43) Frýdek-Místek, Czech Republic

Chess career
- Country: Czech Republic
- Title: International Master (2004); Woman Grandmaster (2001)
- FIDE rating: 2402 (May 2010)
- Peak rating: 2423 (April 2007)

Jana Jacková (born 6 August 1982) is a Czech chess player. She played for the Czech team in following Chess Olympiads: Elista 1998, Istanbul 2000, Bled 2002, Calvià 2004, Turin 2006 and Dresden 2008. In 2002 and in 2006 the team came to the tenth place in the final ranking.

In 2007, she played a friendly match against Dutch Grandmaster Jan Timman in Prague.
