= Anna Hahn (chess player) =

American chess player (born 1976)

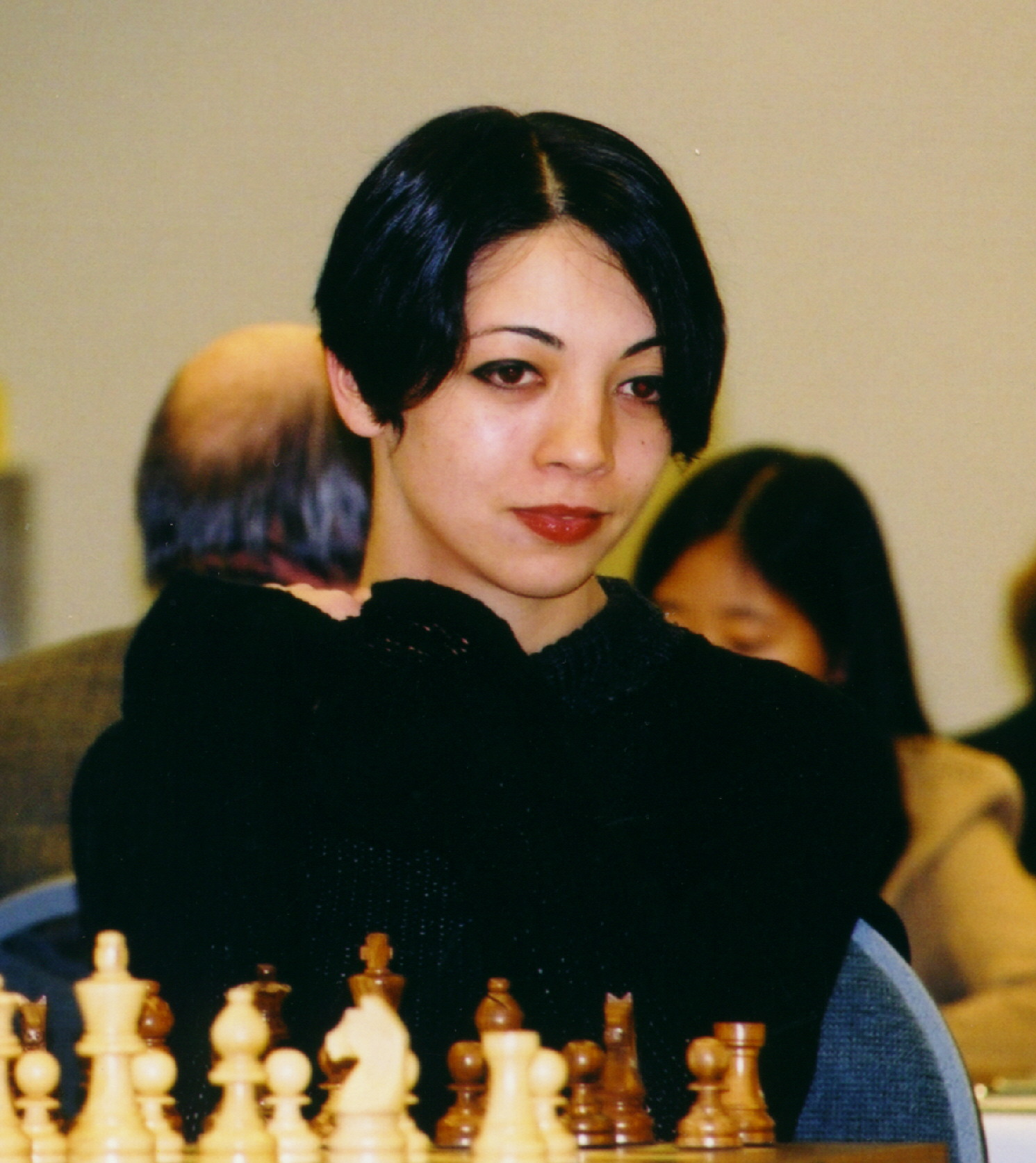
- Hahn at the 2003 U.S. Chess Championships in Seattle

Personal information
- Born: July 21, 1976 (age 49) Riga, Latvian SSR, Soviet Union

Chess career
- Country: Soviet Union (until 1991); Latvia (1991–1994); United States (since 1994)
- Title: Woman International Master (1995)
- FIDE rating: 2235 (July 2004) [inactive]
- Peak rating: 2295 (July 1999)

Anna Hahn (Latvian: Anna Hāna, born June 21, 1976) is a Latvian–American chess player with the title of Woman International Master (WIM).

In her native Latvia, she took the women's championship of 1992 in the Latvian Chess Championship and then moved to the U.S., where in 1994 she won the New York City High School Championship, and helped lead Edward R. Murrow to three consecutive National High School championships (1992–1994).

Hahn represented Latvia in the 30th Chess Olympiad in Manila 1992 and represented the United States in the 34th Chess Olympiad in Istanbul 2000.

She competed in the Women's World Chess Championship 2000, where she reached round 2. Hahn won the 2003 U.S. Women's Chess Championship in Seattle after beating Irina Krush and Jennifer Shahade in a three-way playoff for the title. In the aftermath, there was some controversy when Hahn was not subsequently selected for the Olympiad training squad. This victory qualified her for the Women's World Chess Championship 2004, where she was knocked out in the first round by Pia Cramling.

Anna Hahn was previously known as Anna Khan and many of her older games on chess databases will be found under that name. She works as a trader for D. E. Shaw & Co. in New York City.
