= Irina Turova (chess player) =

Russian chess player (born 1979)

Personal information
- Full name: Irina Iosifovna Turova
- Born: 10 August 1979 (age 46) Gomel, Belarus

Chess career
- Country: Russia
- Title: International Master (2004); Woman Grandmaster (2001)
- FIDE rating: 2381 (September 2019)
- Peak rating: 2442 (May 2011)

Irina Iosifovna Turova (Russian: Ирина Иосифовна Турова; born 10 August 1979), née Irina Slavina (Russian: Ирина Иосифовна Славина, also Irina Slavina-Turova), is a Russian chess player who holds the titles of Woman Grandmaster (2001) and International Master (2004). She won the Russian Women's Chess Championship in 2003.

== Biography ==
Irina was born in Belarus, where her parents worked as chess trainers. After Chernobyl disaster, her family moved to Arkhangelsk, where at age of eight Irina won the second place in the Arkhangelsk Oblast Women's Chess Championship. At the age of eleven, she took the third place in the Russian Youth Chess Championship in the U16 age group of girls, and later at the age of thirteen Irina won the Russian Junior Championship in the U20 age group of girls. In 2000, she was second in the Women's Chess Championship, but in 2003 Irina won this tournament. In 2004, she took the 4th place in European Individual Chess Championship. In 2009, she became the finalist of the Russian Women's Chess Cup, but in 2010 she won this cup. In 2011, she won the Russian Women's Fast Chess Championship.

In the 2000s Irina Turova participated in Women's World Chess Championship by knock-out system:

- In Women's World Chess Championship 2004 in the first round lost to Maia Lomineishvili,
- In Women's World Chess Championship 2006 in the first round lost to Lela Javakhishvili,
- In Women's World Chess Championship 2010 in the first round lost to Sopiko Khukhashvili.

In 2000, she was awarded the FIDE Woman International Master (WIM) title and received the FIDE Woman Grandmaster (WGM) title one year later. In 2004, she was awarded the FIDE International Master (IM) title.

She is married to Russian Grandmaster (GM) Maxim Turov.
