= Marta Michna =

Polish-German chess player (born 1978)

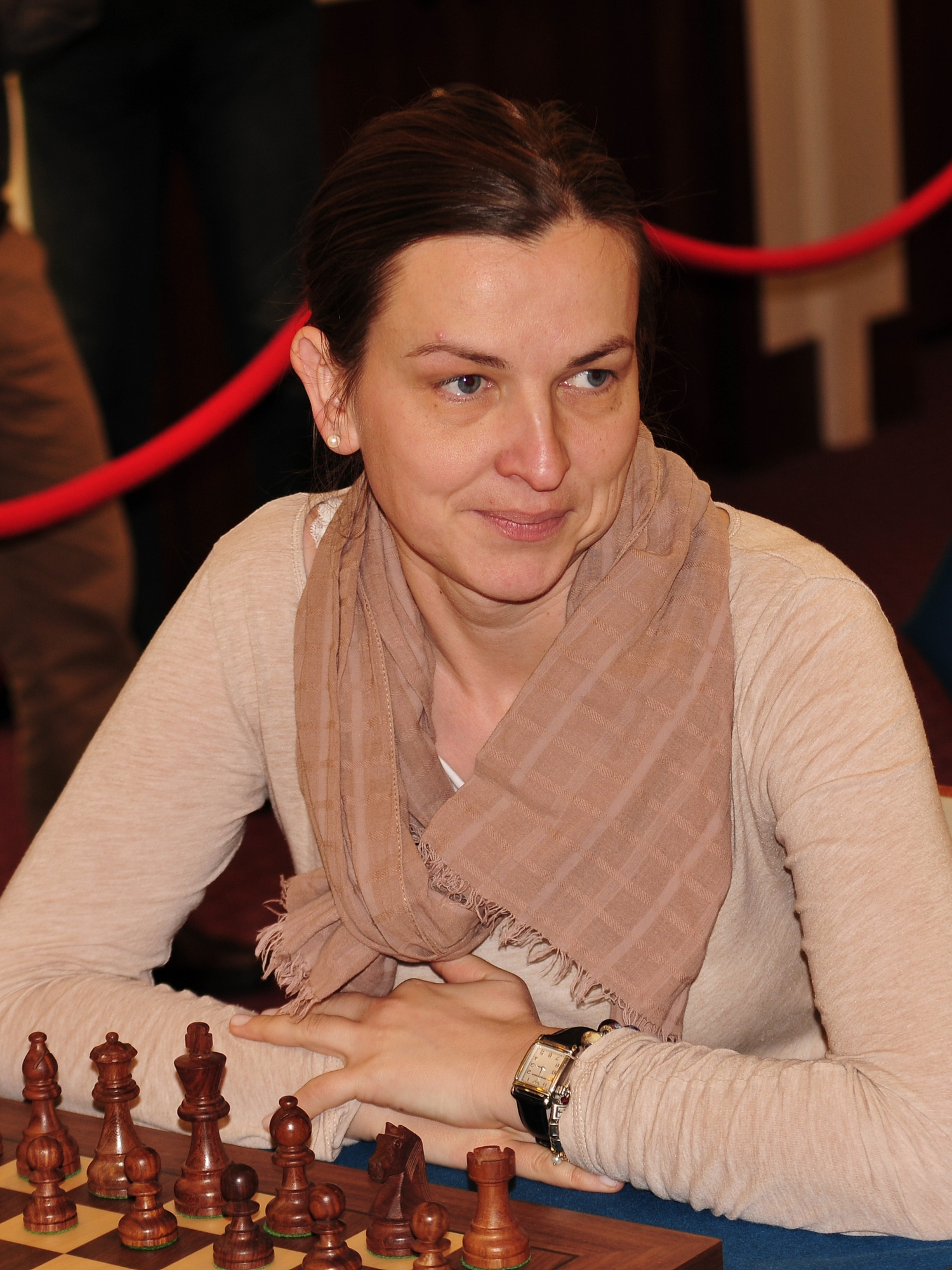
- Michna in Warsaw, 2013

Personal information
- Born: 30 January 1978 (age 48) Głogów, Poland

Chess career
- Country: Poland (until 2007); Germany (since 2007)
- Title: Woman Grandmaster (1999)
- Peak rating: 2430 (October 2002)

Marta Michna (née Zielińska; born 30 January 1978) is a Polish-born chess player who won the Polish Women's Chess Championship in 2003. FIDE Woman Grandmaster (1999). In 2007, she began representing Germany.

== Chess career ==
Marta Michna became interested in chess at the age of eight. In 1990s she was one of the leading Polish youth chess player. She won European Youth Chess Championship (U-18) in 1995 in Verdun and World Youth Chess Championship (U-18) in 1996 in Cala Galdana.

In the Polish Women's Chess Championship's finals Marta Michna won six medals: gold (2003), silver (2002) and 4 bronze (1994, 1996, 1998, 2000).

In 2000s Marta Michna participated in Women's World Chess Championship by knock-out system:

- In Women's World Chess Championship 2000 advanced to the second round, where lost to Ekaterina Kovalevskaya,
- In Women's World Chess Championship 2001 in the first round won to Nona Gaprindashvili, but in second round lost to Almira Skripchenko,
- In Women's World Chess Championship 2006 in the first round lost to Ketevan Arakhamia-Grant.

Marta Michna played for Poland and Germany in Women's Chess Olympiads:

- In 1996, won individual gold medal at first reserve board (Poland) in the 32nd Chess Olympiad (women) in Yerevan (+6, =0, -1),
- In 1998, at first reserve board (Poland) in the 33rd Chess Olympiad (women) in Elista (+2, =5, -2),
- In 2000, at first reserve board (Poland) in the 34th Chess Olympiad (women) in Istanbul (+5, =2, -1),
- In 2004, won individual bronze medal at first reserve board (Poland) in the 36th Chess Olympiad (women) in Calvia (+5, =5, -0),
- In 2008, at third board (Germany) in the 38th Chess Olympiad (women) in Dresden (+5, =5, -0),
- In 2012, at fourth board (Germany) in the 40th Chess Olympiad (women) in Istanbul (+5, =5, -0).

Marta Michna played for Poland and Germany in European Team Chess Championship:

- In 2003, at second board (Poland) in the 5th European Team Chess Championship (women) in Plovdiv (+1, =2, -1),
- In 2005, won team gold medal at reserve board (Poland) in the 6th European Team Chess Championship (women) in Gothenburg (+2, =2, -2),
- In 2007, at third board (Germany) in the 7th European Team Chess Championship (women) in Heraklion (+3, =4, -1),
- In 2009, at third board (Germany) in the 8th European Team Chess Championship (women) in Novi Sad (+3, =4, -1),
- In 2011, at second board (Germany) in the 9th European Team Chess Championship (women) in Porto Carras (+4, =3, -2),
- In 2013, at reserve board (Germany) in the 10th European Team Chess Championship (women) in Warsaw (+3, =2, -2).

== Personal life ==
At the end of the 1990s Marta had a relationship with Alexei Shirov, with whom she has a daughter Masza. In 2006, she married FIDE Master (FM) Christian Michna (born 1972) and since 2007 in the international arena represented Germany. She lives in Hamburg and has four children - Masza, Mateusz, Milosz and Maja.
