= Zvonko Stanojoski =

Macedonian chess player

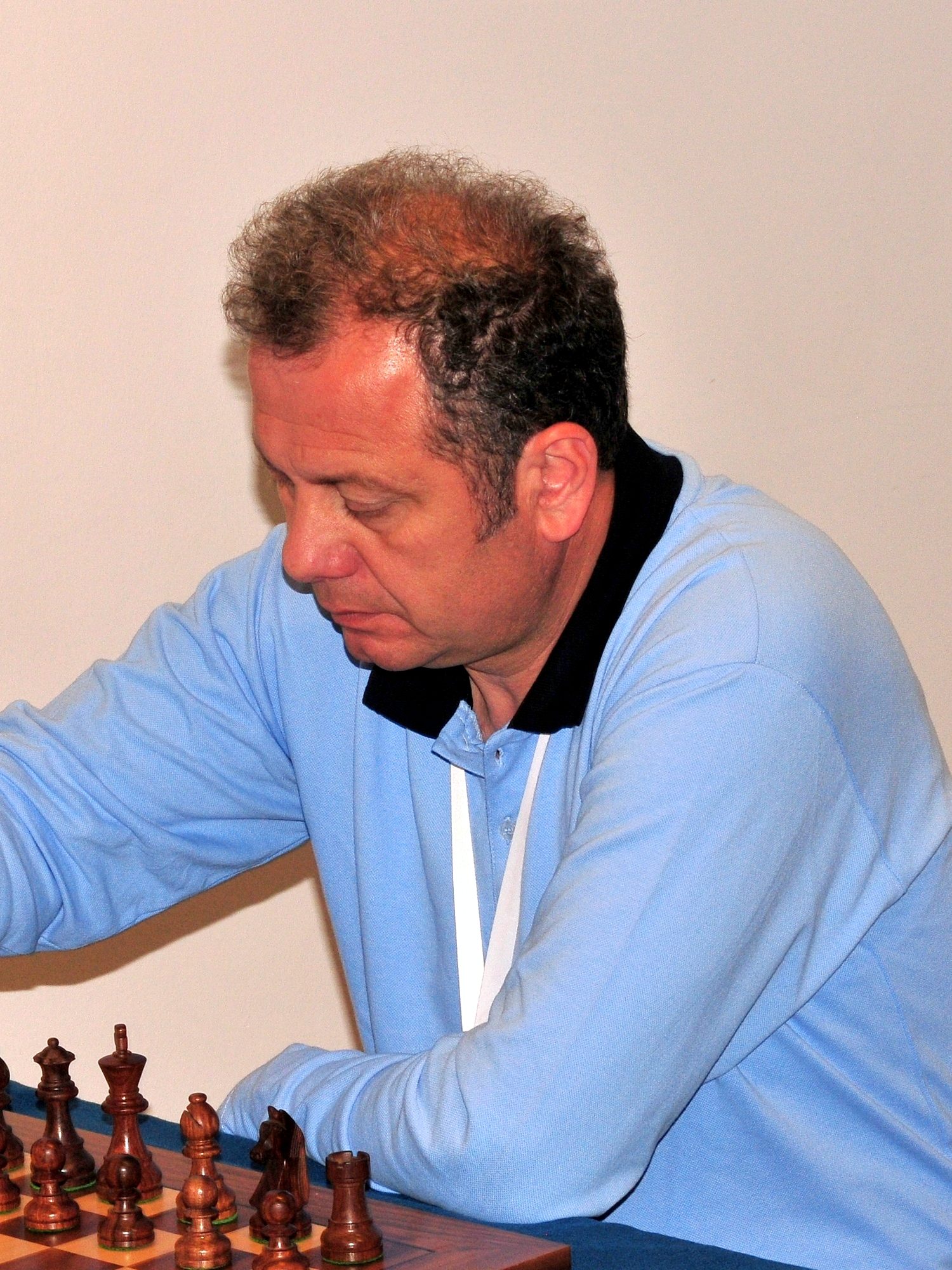
- Stanojoski in 2013

Personal information
- Born: January 29, 1964 (age 62) Prilep, North Macedonia

Chess career
- Country: Yugoslavia; North Macedonia
- Title: Grandmaster (2004)
- Peak rating: 2529 (January 2008)

Zvonko Stanojoski (Macedonian: Звонко Станојоски; born January 29, 1964, in Prilep) is a Macedonian chess Grandmaster. In 2007 he won the Open Championship of Macedonia with a score of 7.5/9, one point above Dragoljub Jacimovic. He achieved International Master status in 1999 and grandmaster status in 2004. On 30th of August 2015, he won Macedonian Championship once again.

Stanojoski played eight times for Macedonia in Chess Olympiads (1994–1998, 2002–2010).
