= Inga Khurtsilava =

Georgian chess player

Personal information
- Born: 17 April 1975 (age 51)

Chess career
- Country: Georgia
- Title: Woman Grandmaster (2013)
- Peak rating: 2312 (July 2006)

Inga Khurtsilava (born 17 April 1975) is a Georgian female chess player. She earned the FIDE title of Woman Grandmaster (WGM) in 2013/ She is a three-time winner of the Georgian Women's Chess Championship (1991, 1997, 2000).

== Biography ==
She won the Georgian Women's Chess Championships three times: in 1991, 1997 and 2000. Participating in the Women's World Chess Championship of 2000, which was a knock-out event, she eliminated Nona Gaprindashvili in the first round, but was defeated by Viktorija Čmilytė in the second.
