= Toni Lazov =

Macedonian chess player (born 2000)

Personal information
- Born: May 12, 2000 (age 26)

Chess career
- Country: North Macedonia
- Title: International Master (2020)
- Peak rating: 2428 (August 2021)

Toni Lazov is a Macedonian chess player.

== Chess career ==
In May 2024, he won the Macedonian Chess Championship with a score of 7.5/9 and defeating Filip Pancevski and Anton Zlatkov in the last two rounds.

In September 2024, he played in the 45th Chess Olympiad, where he won the individual silver medal for the Board 2 player category with a score of 7.5/8. His notable achievements included wins against grandmasters Yannick Pelletier and Kacper Piorun, as well as holding super-grandmaster Jorden van Foreest to a draw.
