= Fliura Khasanova =

Kazakhstani chess player

Personal information
- Born: December 31, 1964 (age 61) Chirchiq, Uzbek SSR, Soviet Union

Chess career
- Country: Kazakhstan
- Title: Woman Grandmaster (1998)
- Peak rating: 2350 (July 1997)

Fliura Sirenyevna Khasanova (Russian: Флюра Сиреньевна Хасанова; born December 31, 1964) is a Kazakhstani chess player, and a woman grandmaster.

She won the Girls' World Junior Chess Championship in 1983. She became an International Grand Master in 1998.
