= Anna Styazhkina =

Russian chess player (born 1997)

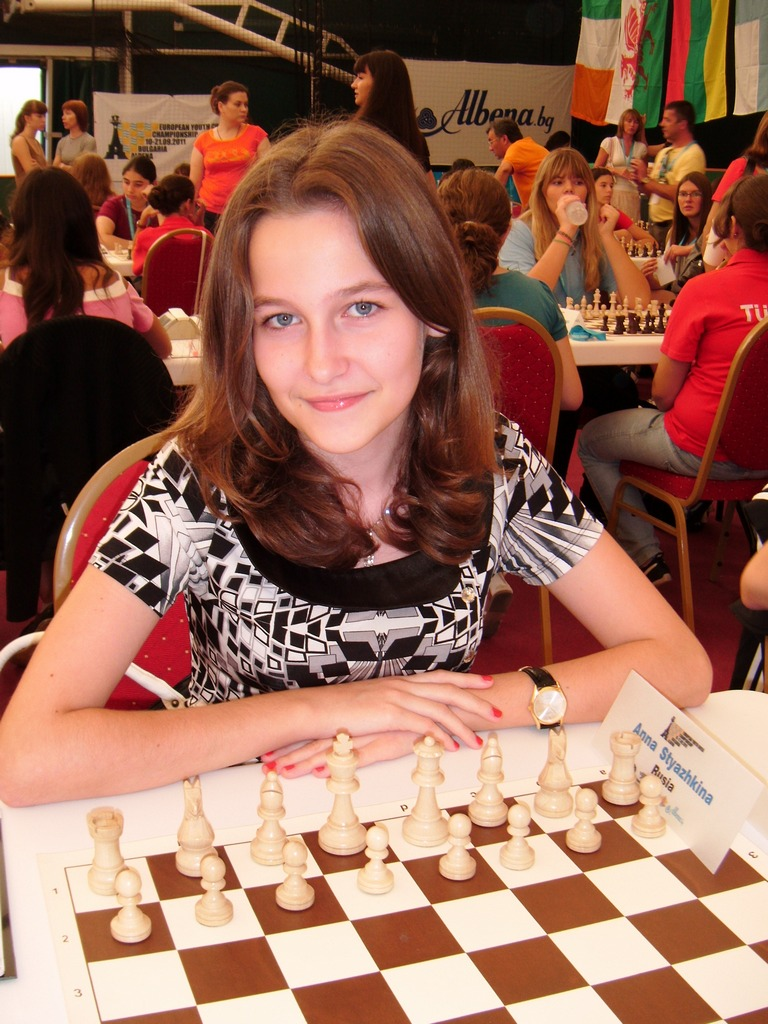
- Styazhkina at the European Youth Chess Championship, 2011

Personal information
- Full name: Anna Vyacheslavovna Styazhkina
- Born: 5 June 1997 (age 29)

Chess career
- Country: Russia
- Title: Woman International Master (2013)
- Peak rating: 2329 (July 2016)

Anna Vyacheslavovna Styazhkina (Russian: Анна Вячеславовна Стяжкина; born 5 June 1997) is a Russian chess player. She received the FIDE title of Woman International Master (WIM) in 2013 and won the under 10 girls' section of the World Youth Chess Championship in 2007 and the under 16 girls' in 2012. She was the runner-up at the World U12 Girls' Championship in 2009 and at the World U14 Girls' Championship in 2011.

== Chess career ==
Styazhkina also won the U12 Girls' division of the European Youth Chess Championship in 2008 and the U16 Girls' in 2013. She won silver in the 2007 European U10 Girls' Championship and 2010 European U14 Girls' Championship and bronze in the 2014 European U18 Girls' Championship.

She played for "Peter Rook 1" team that took first place in the 2015 Russian Youth Team Championship. In this competition she also won the prize for the best female player, thanks to her 8.5/9 score and a 2485 performance rating.

In 2016, she won the Women's Saint Petersburg Chess Championship.

She comes from a chess family: her father Viacheslav is an International Master and Peter Svidler's first trainer, and her mother Olga is a Woman Grandmaster.
