= Luciana Morales Mendoza =

Peruvian chess player (born 1987)

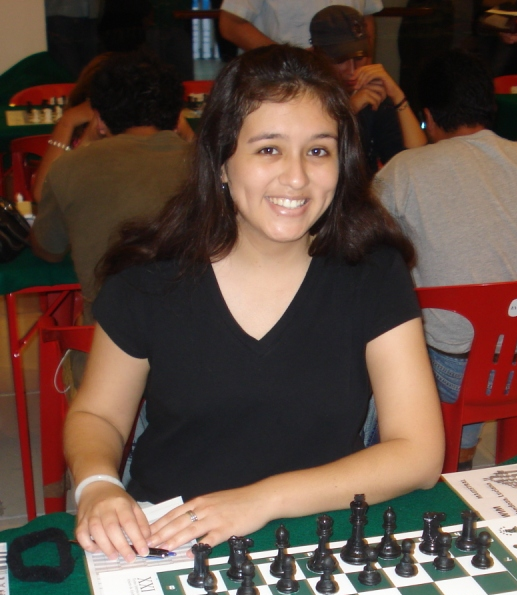

Personal information
- Born: January 1, 1987 (age 39) Lima, Peru

Chess career
- Country: Peru
- Title: Woman International Master (2003)
- Peak rating: 2219 (October 2006)

Luciana Morales Mendoza (born January 1, 1987) is a Peruvian chess player holding title of Woman International Master (WIM). She competed in the Women's World Chess Championship in 2004.

== Career ==
In May 2003 Morales Mendoza won the Pan-American Championship for Girls Under 20 in Botucatu, Brazil. The following month she also won the Girls Under 16 section of the 15th Pan-American Youth Chess Festival in Bogotá, Colombia. In September 2003 she was the champion of the Zonal Tournament 2.4 in São Paulo with 9 points in 10 games, qualifying to the Women's World Chess Championship that was held in 2004 in Elista. There she scored ½-1½ against Kateryna Lahno and thus, was eliminated. In June 2005 she won the Girls Under 18 division at the 17th Pan-American Youth Chess Festival in Balneário Camboriú. In February 2007 she won the South American Championship for Girls Under 20 in Buenos Aires, Argentina.

Morales Mendoza has played in the Peruvian team in the Women's Chess Olympiad in 2002, 2006 and 2010. She was also the captain of team Peru in the Chess Olympiad held in Turin 2006.

== Personal life ==
Morales Mendoza studied Government and Communication at the University of Texas at Brownsville from 2007 to 2011. She also completed a master's in public policy and management in Brownsville in May 2014.
