= Olga Stjazhkina =

Russian chess player (born 1970)

Personal information
- Full name: Olga Mikhailovna Stjazhkina
- Born: 7 June 1970 (age 56)

Chess career
- Country: Russia
- Title: Woman Grandmaster (1994)
- FIDE rating: 2190 (August 2015)
- Peak rating: 2376 (July 2004)

Olga Mikhailovna Stjazhkina (Russian: Ольга Михайловна Стяжкина; born 7 June 1970), née Florov, is a Russian chess player who received the FIDE title of Woman Grandmaster (WGM) in 1994.

== Biography ==
Olga Stjazhkina is Saint Petersburg chess school graduate. She five times won Saint Petersburg City Women's Chess Championship. Olga Stjazhkina twice won Russian Women's Team Chess Championships.

In 2000, Olga Stjazhkina participated in Women's World Chess Championship by knock-out system and in the first round lost to Wang Lei.

In 1994, she received the FIDE Woman Grandmaster (WGM) title. In 2015, she became a FIDE Arbiter (FA).

Her daughter Anna (born 1997) also is chess master, winner of World Youth Chess Championships and European Youth Chess Championships.
