= Vlatko Bogdanovski =

Macedonian chess grandmaster (born 1964)

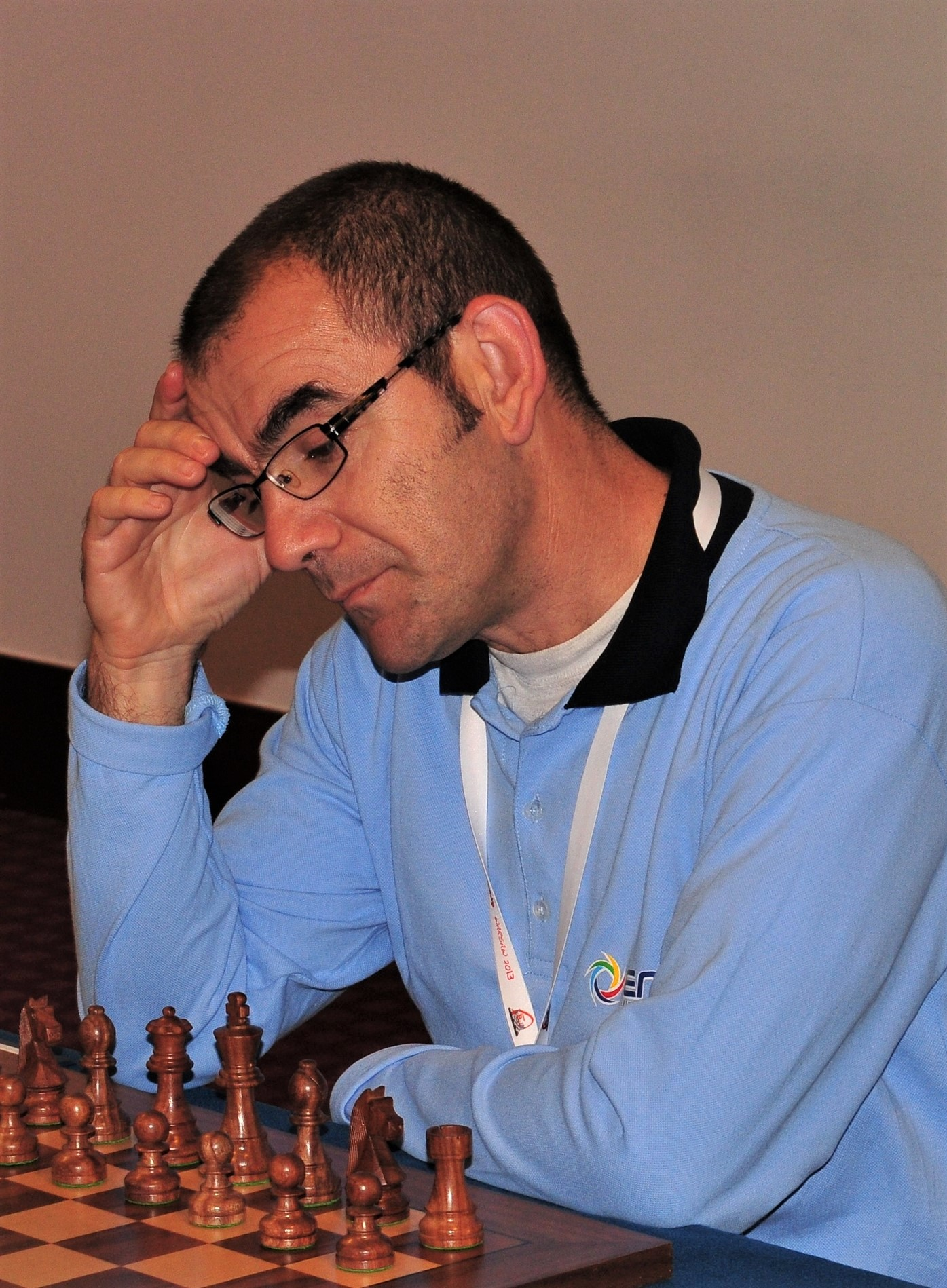
- GM Vlatko Bogdanovski, European Chess Team Championship Warsaw 2013

Personal information
- Born: 31 December 1964 (age 61) SR Macedonia, SFR Yugoslavia

Chess career
- Country: North Macedonia
- Title: Grandmaster (1993)
- Peak rating: 2515 (July 1993)

Vlatko Bogdanovski (born 31 December 1964 in Yugoslavia). is a chess player from North Macedonia who was a FIDE Trainer and chess grandmaster. He received the international master title in 1988 and chess grandmaster title in 1993.

== Notable tournaments ==
Notable tournaments
Tournament name	Year	ELO	Points
Bijeljina Dvorovi(Bijeljina Dvorovi)	2002	2435	6.0
Belgrade schev(Belgrade)	1999	2502	9.0
Tivat(Tivat)	1997	2495	6.5
EUCup Gr6(Heraklio)	1997	2480	3.0
Star Dojran(Star Dojran)	1996	2455	8.5
Star Dorjan(Star Dorjan)	1995	2435	6.0
FRM-ch(Struga)	1993	2515	10.0
Prilep(Prilep)	1992	2425	6.5
Star Dojran(Star Dojran)	1991	2440	6.5
Struga(Struga)	1991	2440	8.5
Lodz(Lodz)	1989	2430	7.5
Bytom(Bytom)	1988	2460	7.0
