= Julia Demina =

Russian chess player (1969–2025)

Personal information
- Born: February 3, 1969 Yekaterinburg, Soviet Union
- Died: November 2025 (aged 56)

Chess career
- Country: Russia
- Title: Woman Grandmaster (1991)
- Peak rating: 2405 (July 1991)

Julia Viktorovna Demina (Russian: Юлия Викторовна Дёмина; February 3, 1969 – November 2025) was a Russian chess player. She has won the Women's Russian Chess Championship twice, the Soviet championship once before, and competed for the Women's World Chess Championship several times. Demina earned the title of Woman Grandmaster in 1991. She died in November 2025, at the age of 56.
