= Dragoljub Jacimović =

Macedonian chess grandmaster (born 1964)

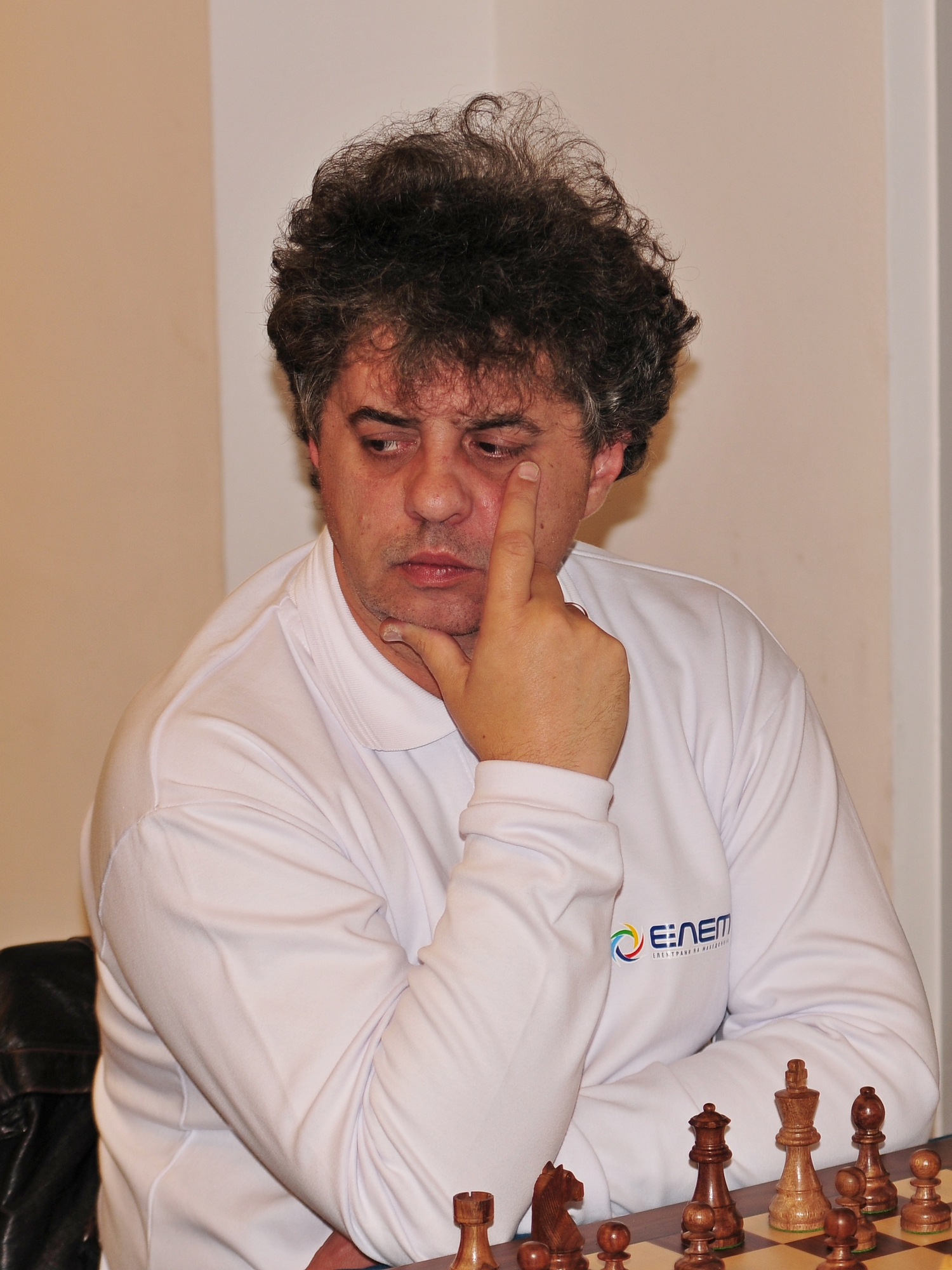
- Dragoljub Jacimović in 2013

Personal information
- Born: 10 January 1964 (age 62)

Chess career
- Country: Yugoslavia; North Macedonia
- Title: Grandmaster (2001)
- Peak rating: 2504 (April 2001)

Dragoljub Jaćimović (Macedonian: Драгољуб Јаќимовиќ; born 10 January 1964) is a Macedonian chess Grandmaster (GM) (2001), Macedonian Chess Championship winner (1996), Chess Olympiad individual gold medal winner (2000).

== Biography ==
Twice Dragoljub Jacimović played in Yugoslav Chess Championship finals (1985, 1991). After Macedonia's proclamation of independence he has been one of the leading Macedonian chess players. Dragoljub Jacimović has repeatedly participated in the Macedonian Chess Championships, with the best successes in 1996 (winner), 2005 (shared 1st - 3rd place), 2007 (shared 2nd - 3rd place), 2008 (shared 3rd - 5th). In 1998, in Skopje Dragoljub Jacimović ranked 3rd in the International Chess Tournament, but in 2011, in this tournament, he shared 1st -5th place.

Dragoljub Jacimović played for North Macedonia in the Chess Olympiads:

- In 1994, at third board in the 31st Chess Olympiad in Moscow (+4, =5, -3),
- In 1996, at fourth board in the 32nd Chess Olympiad in Yerevan (+5, =5, -2),
- In 1998, at third board in the 33rd Chess Olympiad in Elista (+4, =4, -2),
- In 2000, at third board in the 34th Chess Olympiad in Istanbul (+6, =2, -1) and won individual gold medal,
- In 2006, at fourth board in the 37th Chess Olympiad in Turin (+1, =5, -1).

Dragoljub Jacimović played for North Macedonia in the World Team Chess Championship:

- In 2001, at third board in the 5th World Team Chess Championship in Yerevan (+0, =3, -2).

Dragoljub Jacimović played for North Macedonia in the European Team Chess Championships:

- In 1997, at first reserve board in the 11th European Team Chess Championship in Pula (+2, =5, -0),
- In 2001, at fourth board in the 13th European Team Chess Championship in León (+2, =3, -2),
- In 2005, at third board in the 15th European Team Chess Championship in Gothenburg (+1, =2, -3),
- In 2013, at first reserve board in the 19th European Team Chess Championship in Warsaw (+1, =2, -0).
