= Nataša Bojković =

Serbian chess player

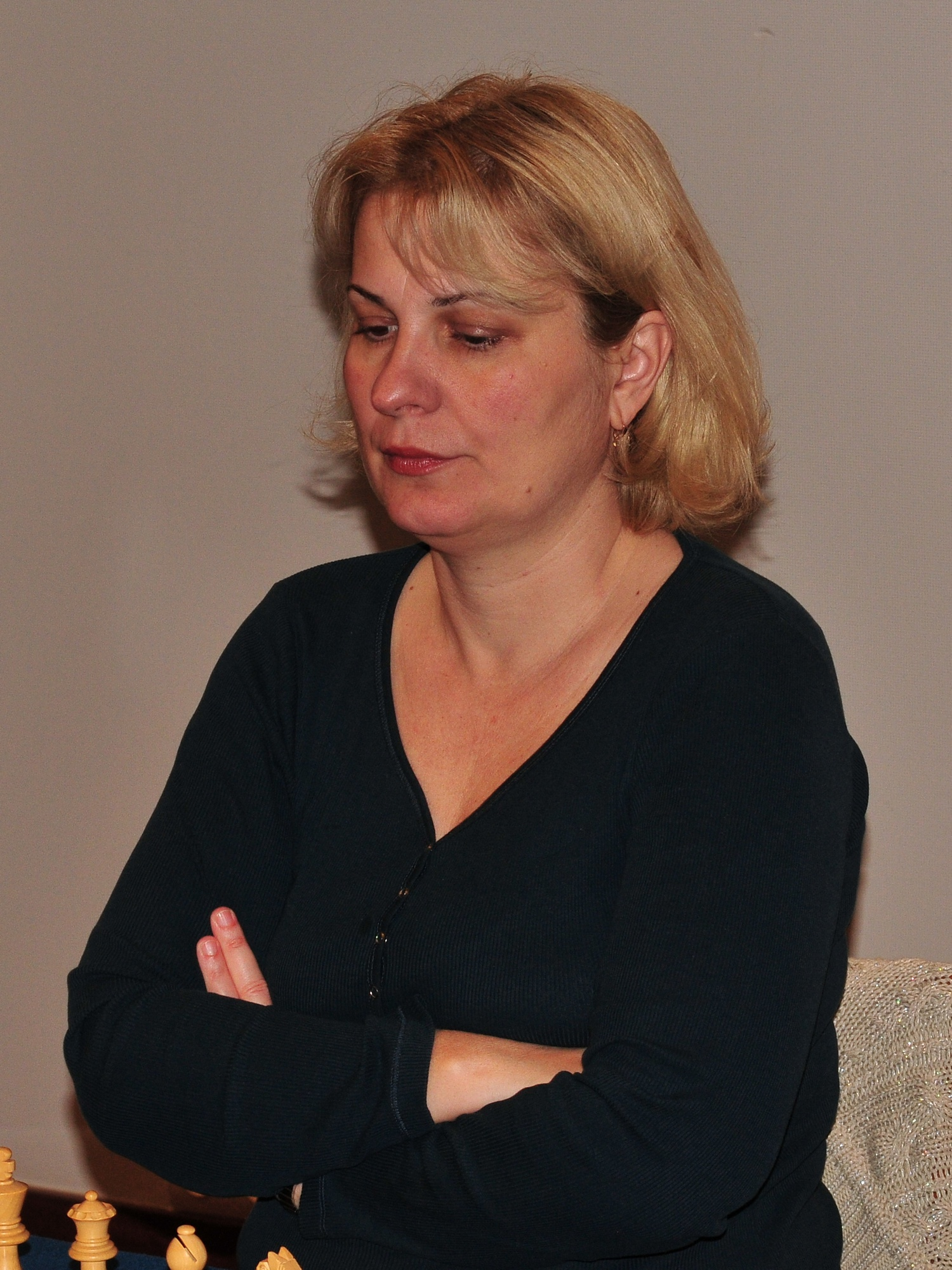
- Bojković in 2013

Personal information
- Born: 3 September 1971 (age 55)

Chess career
- Country: Serbia
- Title: International Master (2007); Woman Grandmaster (1991)
- FIDE rating: 2363 (October 2019)
- Peak rating: 2460 (July 1994)

Nataša Bojković (Serbian Cyrillic: Наташа Бојковић; born 3 September 1971) is a Serbian chess player, an International Master (IM) and a Woman Grandmaster (WGM).

She won the Girls' World Junior Chess Championship in 1991.

She won the Women's Yugoslav Chess Championship four times.

She has competed for the world championship, most recently in the Women's World Chess Championship 2000 where she made it to the second round.

== See also ==
- List of female chess players
