= Maia Lomineishvili =

Georgian chess player

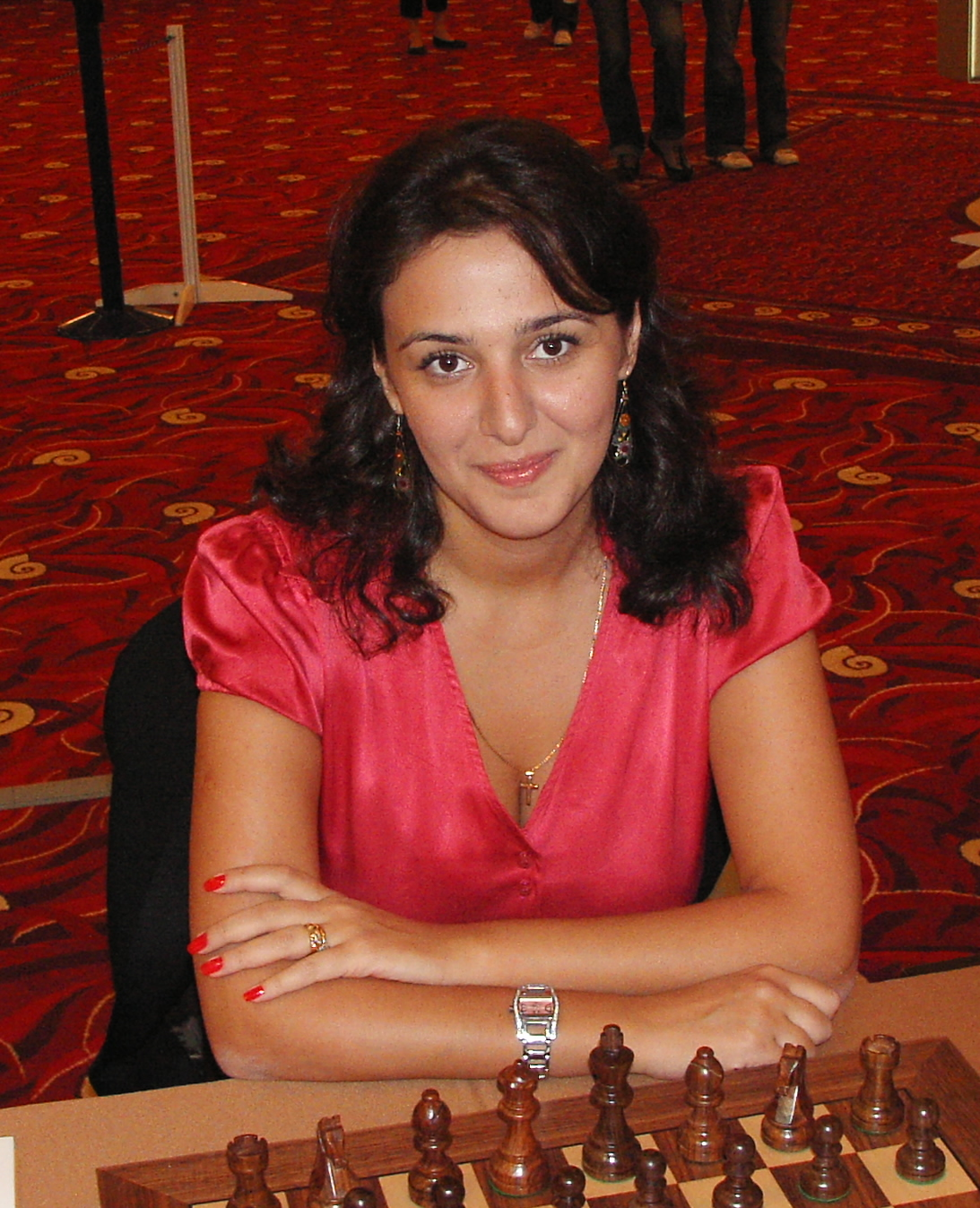
- Maia Lomineishvili in 2007

Personal information
- Born: 11 November 1977 (age 48) Tbilisi, Georgian SSR, Soviet Union

Chess career
- Title: International Master (2003); Woman Grandmaster (1996)
- Peak rating: 2447 (April 2009)

Maia Lomineishvili (Georgian: მაია ლომინეიშვილი; born 1977) is a Georgian chess player, and an international master.

She has won the Women's Georgian Chess Championship five times, and competed in the Women's World Chess Championship several times.

In 1991 she won the Girls' Under-14 European Youth Chess Championship.

In 2005, she played in the Georgian team which won the silver medal in the Women's European Team Chess Championship.

As of March 2014 she was ranked world no. 92 woman.
