= Tatjana Vasilevich =

Ukrainian chess player

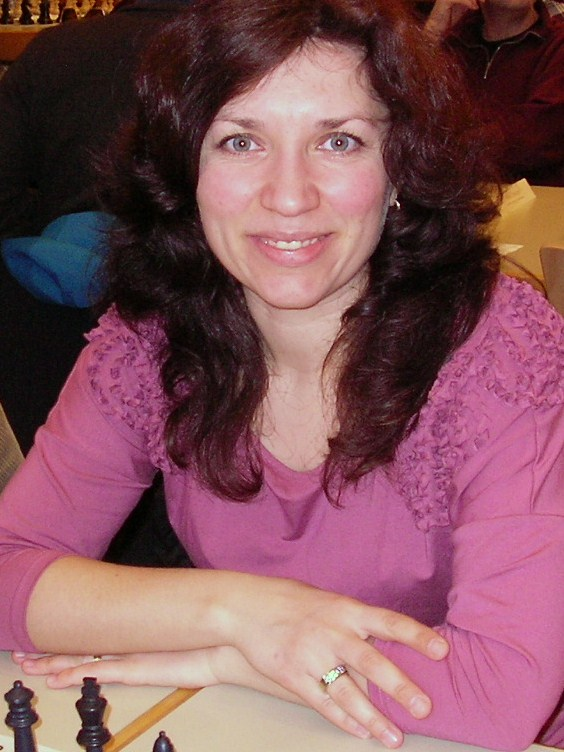
- Vasilevich in 2012

Personal information
- Born: January 14, 1977 (age 49) Yevpatoria, Ukrainian SSR, Soviet Union

Chess career
- Country: Ukraine (until 2020); Russia (since 2020)
- Title: International Master (2002)
- Peak rating: 2436 (April 2001)

Tatjana Vasilevich (born January 14, 1977) is a Ukrainian-born Russian chess player. She holds the title of international master.

She has won the Women's Ukrainian Chess Championship three times, and competed in the Women's World Chess Championship twice, and played for the Ukrainian women's team which won a bronze in the World Team Chess Championship.
