= Nino Gurieli =

Georgian chess player (born 1961)

Nino Gurieli ნინო გურიელი
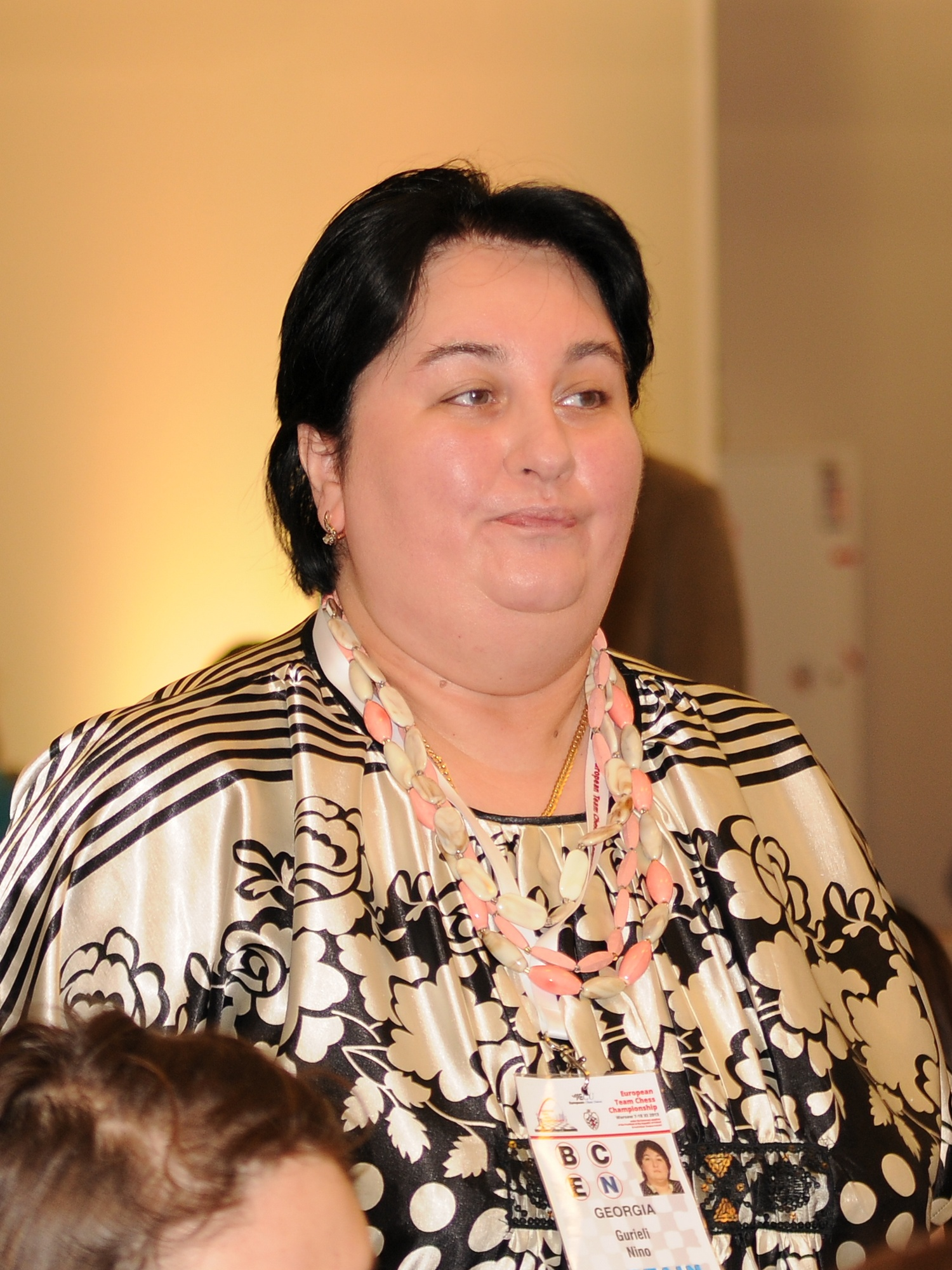
- Gurieli in 2013

Personal information
- Born: December 7, 1961 (age 64) Tbilisi, Georgian SSR, Soviet Union

Chess career
- Country: Soviet Union; Georgia
- Title: International Master (1997); Woman Grandmaster (1980)
- FIDE rating: 2295 (April 2014)
- Peak rating: 2400 (January 1987)

Nino Gurieli (Georgian: ნინო გურიელი; born December 7, 1961) is a Georgian chess player. She received the FIDE titles of International Master (IM) in 1997 and Woman Grandmaster (WGM) in 1980. She is a descendant of the noble family of Gurieli and married to Grandmaster Zurab Sturua.

Gurieli won the Georgian women's chess championship in 1976. She has competed for the Women's World Chess Championship several times, most recently she competed in the Women's World Chess Championship, 2010, where she went out in the first round. In recent years, she has also been acting as a captain of Georgian Women's Olympic Team.
