= Ketino Kachiani =

Georgian chess player (born 1971)

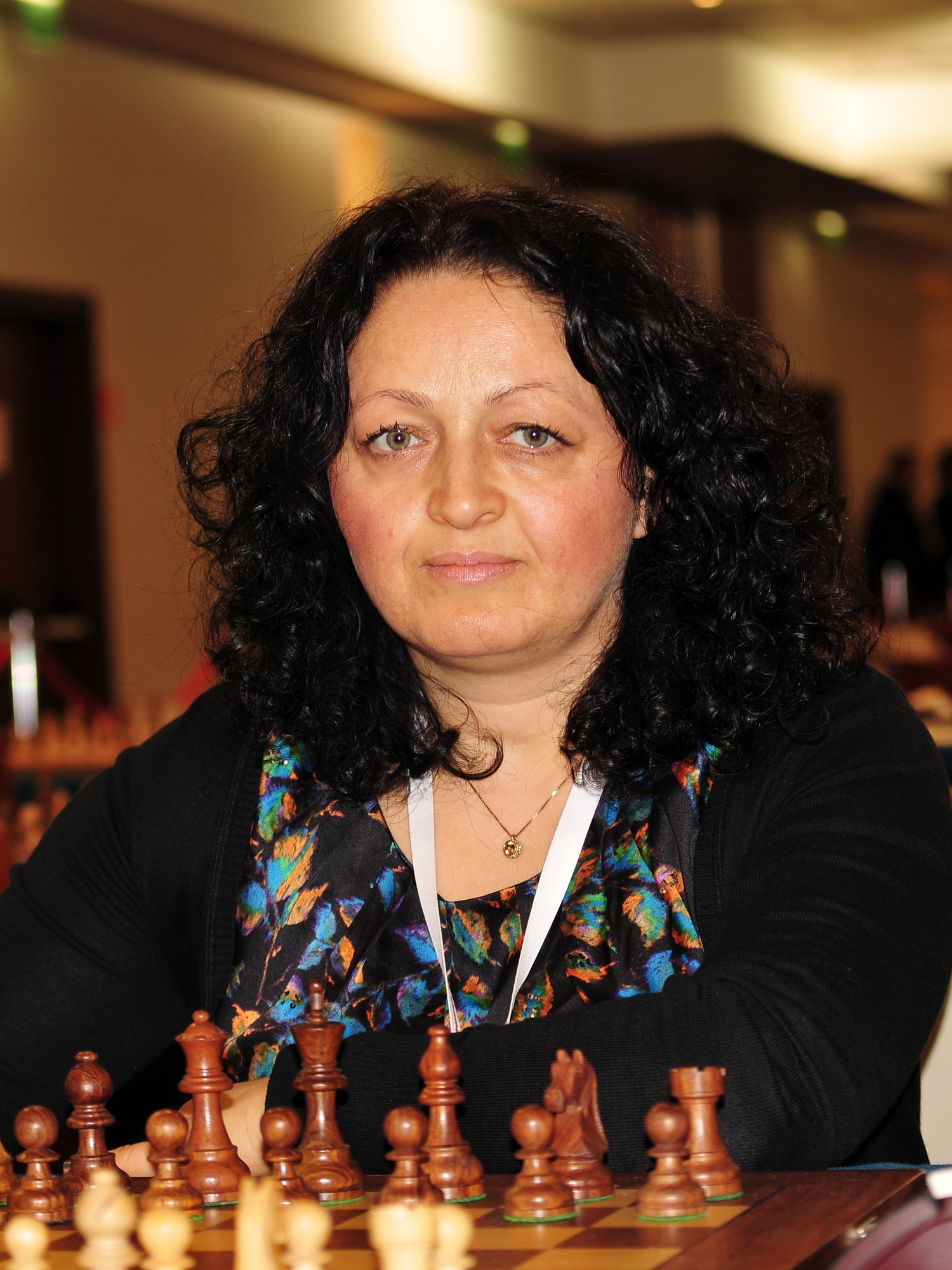
- Ketino Kachiani in 2013

Personal information
- Born: September 11, 1971 (age 54) Mestia, Georgia

Chess career
- Country: Germany
- Title: International Master (1997); Woman Grandmaster (1990)
- Peak rating: 2465 (April 2002)

Ketino Kachiani or Ketino Kachiani-Gersinska (born 11 September 1971 in Mestia, Georgia) is a Georgian chess player with the titles of Woman Grandmaster (1990) and International Master (1997). She is ranked 6th female German player.

She won the World Junior Chess Championship (girls) in 1989 and 1990, and the Georgian Chess Championship (women) in 1987.

She later moved to Germany, married a German called Gersinska, and acquired German citizenship.
