= 34th Chess Olympiad =

2000 chess tournament in Istanbul, Turkey

Official logo of the Olympiad

The 34th Chess Olympiad (Turkish: 34. Satranç Olimpiyatı), organized by the Fédération Internationale des Échecs and comprising an open and women's tournament, took place between October 28 and November 12, 2000, in Istanbul, Turkey. There were 126 teams in the open event and 86 in the women's event.

Both tournament sections were officiated by international arbiter Geurt Gijssen (Netherlands). Teams were paired across the 14 rounds of competition according to the Swiss system. The open division was played over four boards per round, whilst the women's was played over three. In the event of a draw, the tie-break was decided first by the Buchholz system and secondly by match points.

The time control for each game permitted each player 100 minutes to make the first 40 of their moves, then an additional 50 minutes to make the next 20 moves, and then 10 minutes to finish the game, with an additional 30 seconds devolving on each player after each move, beginning with the first.

In addition to the overall medal winners, the teams were divided into seeding groups, with the top finishers in each group receiving special prizes.

== Open event ==
The open division was contested by 126 teams representing 124 nations. Turkey, as hosts, fielded two teams, whilst the International Braille Chess Association provided one squad. Nicaragua, Mauritania, and Djibouti were signed up but never arrived.

Once again, Russia had to do without their strongest players, the "Three Ks". Classical World Champion Garry Kasparov and challenger Vladimir Kramnik were in the midst of their championship match, and ex-champion Anatoly Karpov was still at odds with the national federation. Captained by the new FIDE champion Khalifman, however, Russia were still favourites, and the team did win their fifth consecutive title, although only by a single point. Germany took the silver medals, while Ukraine clinched the bronze, beating Hungary on tie-break. Pre-tournament medal favourites England, whose average rating was a mere 13 points below Russia's, finished a disappointing seventh.

Open event
#	Country	Players	Average rating	Points	Buchholz
1	Russia	Khalifman, Morozevich, Svidler, Rublevsky, Sakaev, Grischuk	2685	38	
2	Germany	Yusupov, Hübner, Dautov, Lutz, Bischoff, Luther	2604	37	
3	Ukraine	Ivanchuk, Ponomariov, Baklan, Eingorn, Romanishin, Malakhatko	2638	35½	457.5
4	Hungary	Leko, Almási, Polgár, Portisch, Sax, Ruck	2661	35½	455.5
5	Israel	Gelfand, Smirin, Avrukh, Psakhis, Sutovsky, Huzman	2652	34½	
6	Georgia	Azmaiparashvili, Giorgadze, Sturua, Kacheishvili, Gelashvili, Jobava	2602	34	
7	England	Adams, Short, Hodgson, Speelman, Miles, Emms	2672	33	441.5
8	India	Krishnan Sasikiran, Abhijit Kunte, Pentala Harikrishna, Dibyendu Barua, Devaki Prasad, Surya Ganguly	2538	33	440.5
9	China	Ye Jiangchuan, Xu Jun, Peng Xiaomin, Wu Wenjin, Liang Chong, Ni Hua	2651	33	439.5
10	Switzerland	Korchnoi, Milov, Gallagher, Pelletier, Jenni, Hug	2562	33	432.5

#	Country	Average rating	Points	Buchholz	MP
11	Uzbekistan	2564	33	429.5	
12	Slovenia	2550	33	421.0	
13	North Macedonia	2483	33	417.0	
14	Bulgaria	2628	32½	459.0	
15	Poland	2590	32½	437.5	
16	France	2544	32½	427.0	
17	Armenia	2606	32	456.5	
18	Bosnia and Herzegovina	2582	32	441.5	
19	Philippines	2510	32	439.0	19
20	Greece	2541	32	439.0	16
21	Denmark	2580	32	436.0	
22	Cuba	2546	32	432.5	
23	Spain	2582	32	432.0	
24	Yugoslavia	2542	32	427.5	
25	Estonia	2530	32	421.0	
26	United States	2627	31½	449.0	
27	Romania	2524	31½	445.0	
28	Slovakia	2552	31½	442.5	
29	Canada	2482	31½	430.0	
30	Scotland	2455	31½	418.5	
31	Lithuania	2490	31½	414.0	
32	Belarus	2577	31½	398.5	
33	Netherlands	2615	31	459.5	
34	Latvia	2493	31	429.0	
35	Moldova	2489	31	422.5	
36	Australia	2483	31	410.0	
37	Vietnam	2505	31	406.0	
38	Brazil	2573	30½	440.0	
39	Czech Republic	2607	30½	432.5	
40	Singapore	2467	30½	403.0	
41	Kazakhstan	2564	30	434.5	
42	Sweden	2548	30	432.5	
43	Croatia	2579	30	427.5	
44	Indonesia	2503	30	416.5	
45	Finland	2451	30	411.5	
46	Azerbaijan	2456	30	410.5	
47	Portugal	2354	30	410.0	
48	Mongolia	2415	30	407.5	
49	Kyrgyzstan	2489	29½	426.5	
50	Egypt	2426	29½	405.5	
51	Ireland	2426	29½	397.5	
52	Norway	2374	29½	396.5	
53	Argentina	2503	29½	386.5	
54	Belgium	2394	29½	377.5	
55	Iceland	2469	29	430.0	
56	Italy	2476	29	425.0	
57	Chile	2411	29	404.0	
58	Bangladesh	2407	29	373.5	
59	Turkmenistan	2449	28½	410.5	
60	Austria	2404	28½	395.5	14
61	Iran	2408	28½	395.5	13
62	Turkey	2337	28½	393.5	
63	Morocco	2386	28½	393.0	
64	Malaysia	2307	28½	387.0	
65	Peru	2376	28½	366.5	
66	Turkey "B"	2265	28	393.0	
67	Faroe Islands	2321	28	385.5	
68	Ecuador	2386	28	379.5	
69	Andorra	2353	28	379.0	
70	South Africa	2221	28	373.5	
71	Tunisia	2219	28	372.5	
72	Venezuela	2368	27½	407.5	
73	United Arab Emirates	2376	27½	389.5	
74	Luxembourg	2279	27½	377.5	
75	Paraguay	2320	27½	374.5	
76	Myanmar	2528	27	397.5	
77	Mexico	2411	27	397.0	
78	IBCA	2325	27	391.0	
79	Pakistan	2301	27	381.5	12
80	Wales	2276	27	381.5	9
81	Costa Rica	2313	27	379.0	
82	Qatar	2228	27	374.0	
83	Colombia	2343	26½	393.0	
84	Angola	2060	26½	375.5	
85	Iraq	2365	26	396.5	
86	Syria	2321	26	388.5	
87	New Zealand	2352	26	386.0	
88	Japan	2215	26	379.0	
89	Puerto Rico	2202	26	367.5	
90	Zambia	2232	25½	387.0	
91	Uruguay	2250	25½	378.5	
92	El Salvador	2185	25½	370.5	
93	Zimbabwe	2210	25½	360.5	
94	Sri Lanka	2081	25½	356.5	
95	Uganda	2218	25½	351.5	
96	Albania	2364	25	388.5	
97	Cyprus	2253	25	374.5	
98	Bolivia	2257	25	370.0	
99	Yemen	2299	25	369.0	
100	Liechtenstein	2121	25	336.5	
101	Barbados	2057	25	331.5	
102	Jamaica	2234	24½	367.0	
103	Kenya	2126	24½	353.5	
104	Suriname	2051	24½	342.0	
105	Honduras	2123	24	363.0	
106	Botswana	2093	24	349.0	
107	Netherlands Antilles	2159	24	346.0	
108	Palestine	2087	24	333.0	
109	Namibia	2152	24	305.5	
110	Malta	2212	23½	354.5	
111	Monaco	2210	23½	342.5	
112	Macau	2190	23½	330.0	
113	Hong Kong	2108	23½	326.5	
114	Ethiopia	2079	23½	319.5	13
115	Mauritius	2000	23½	319.5	11
116	Panama	2058	23½	310.5	
117	Jersey	2145	23½	301.5	
118	Trinidad and Tobago	2214	23		
119	San Marino	2051	22½		
120	Bermuda	2006	20½		
121	Brunei	2000	20	298.5	
122	Seychelles	2056	20	297.5	
123	Papua New Guinea	2051	19½		
124	Guernsey	2092	18½		
125	United States Virgin Islands	2020	13½		
126	Rwanda	2000	7½		

=== Individual medals ===
- Performance rating: (Russia) Alexander Morozevich 2804
- Board 1: (Indonesia) Utut Adianto 7½ / 9 = 83.3%
- Board 2: (Ukraine) Ruslan Ponomariov 8½ / 11 = 77.3%
- Board 3: (North Macedonia) Dragoljub Jacimović 7 / 9 = 77.8%
- Board 4: (Armenia) Ashot Anastasian 9 / 12 = 75.0%
- 1st reserve: (United Arab Emirates) Taleb Moussa 6 / 7 = 85.7%
- 2nd reserve: (Uzbekistan) Alexei Barsov 5½ / 7 = 78.6%

== Women's event ==
The women's division was contested by 86 teams representing 84 nations. Turkey, as hosts, fielded two teams, whilst the International Braille Chess Association entered one squad.

Defending champions China were huge favourites on rating and retained their title, led by reigning world champion Xie Jun and with two future champions in the team: Zhu Chen and Xu Yuhua. Georgia and Russia took the silver and bronze medals, respectively.

#	Country	Players	Average rating	Points	Buchholz
1	China	Xie Jun, Zhu Chen, Xu Yuhua, Wang Lei	2537	32	
2	Georgia	Chiburdanidze, Ioseliani, Khurtsidze, Gurieli	2480	31	
3	Russia	Galliamova, Kovalevskaya, Matveeva, Stepovaya-Dianchenko	2480	28½	
4	Ukraine	Zhukova, Zatonskih, Vasilevich, Sedina	2442	27	
5	Yugoslavia	Marić, Bojković, Prudnikova, Chelushkina	2430	26	
6	Netherlands	Zhaoqin Peng, Sziva, Bosboom-Lanchava, Jap Tjoen San	2329	25½	
7	Hungary	Mádl, Lakos, Grábics, Gara	2369	25	342.0
8	Germany	Kachiani-Gersinska, Paehtz, Koglin, Trabert	2364	25	333.5
9	England	Hunt, Lalic, Houska, Richards	2349	25	325.5
10	Armenia	Danielian, Mkrtchian, Hlgatian, Aginian	2303	24½	342.5

#	Country	Average rating	Points	Buchholz	MP
11	Romania	2350	24½	333.0	
12	Moldova	2385	24	328.5	
13	India	2272	24	328.0	
14	Poland	2386	24	323.5	
15	United States	2261	24	316.0	
16	Bulgaria	2328	23½	324.5	
17	Cuba	2302	23½	317.0	
18	Latvia	2249	23½	303.0	
19	Kazakhstan	2299	23	325.0	
20	Israel	2325	23	300.5	
21	Azerbaijan	2251	22½	334.5	
22	Czech Republic	2271	22½	334.0	
23	Vietnam	2367	22½	329.0	
24	Belarus	2325	22½	326.5	
25	Spain	2251	22½	320.0	
26	Greece	2295	22½	312.5	
27	Australia	2188	22½	306.0	
28	Slovakia	2305	22½	305.0	
29	Estonia	2239	22½	302.5	
30	Lithuania	2237	22	321.0	
31	Uzbekistan	2171	22	307.0	
32	Croatia	2254	22	304.5	
33	Mongolia	2162	22	301.5	
34	Finland	2148	22	300.0	
35	Portugal	2065	22	296.0	
36	Bosnia and Herzegovina	2237	21½	313.5	
37	Bangladesh	2050	21½	305.0	
38	Sweden	2188	21½	303.0	
39	France	2269	21½	296.5	
40	Philippines	2070	21½	294.5	
41	Austria	2170	21	309.5	
42	Denmark	2108	21	305.5	
43	Turkmenistan	2233	21	304.0	
44	Switzerland	2162	21	300.0	
45	Slovenia	2207	21	297.0	14
46	Ecuador	2309	21	297.0	12
47	North Macedonia	2122	21	295.0	
48	Italy	2039	21	281.0	
49	Venezuela	2101	20½	301.5	
50	Kyrgyzstan	2123	20½	295.5	
51	Argentina	2146	20½	287.5	
52	IBCA	2122	20½	285.5	
53	Iran	2008	20½	285.0	
54	Wales	2053	20½	280.5	
55	Indonesia	2080	20½	272.0	
56	Norway	2062	20	297.5	
57	Brazil	2151	20	294.0	
58	Scotland	2084	20	291.0	
59	Canada	2070	20	274.0	
60	Malaysia	2061	20	268.0	
61	Ireland	2035	20	239.0	
62	Mexico	2069	19½	296.0	
63	Turkey	2032	19½	286.5	
64	United Arab Emirates	2000	19½	274.5	
65	Costa Rica	2000	19½	262.5	
66	Japan	2000	19½	259.0	
67	Turkey "B"	2000	19½	256.5	
68	Colombia	2159	19	279.5	
69	Albania	2077	19	266.0	
70	Guatemala	2070	19	257.0	
71	South Africa	2050	18½	270.0	
72	Iraq	2061	18½	268.5	
73	El Salvador	2015	18½	262.0	
74	New Zealand	2000	18½	243.5	
75	Morocco	2000	18½	242.0	
76	Puerto Rico	2000	18½	233.5	
77	Syria	2000	18	257.0	
78	Iceland	2042	18	246.5	
79	Singapore	2000	18	238.5	
80	Sri Lanka	2000	18	232.5	
81	Botswana	2000	18	224.5	
82	Angola	2000	14½	225.0	
83	Zambia	2000	14½	224.5	
84	Macau	2000	10½		
85	Yemen	2000	7½		
86	United States Virgin Islands	2021	2½		

=== Individual medals ===
- Performance rating: (China) Zhu Chen 2641
- Board 1: (Lithuania) Viktorija Čmilytė 9½ / 12 = 79.2%
- Board 2: (China) Zhu Chen 9 / 11 = 81.8%
- Board 3: (Georgia (country)) Nino Khurtsidze 11 / 13 = 84.6%
- Reserve: (Morocco) Zahira El-Ghabi 6½ / 7 = 92.9%

== Overall title ==
The Nona Gaprindashvili Trophy is awarded to the nation that has the best average rank in the open and women's divisions. Where two or more teams are tied, they are ordered by best single finish in either division and then by total number of points scored.

The trophy, named after the former women's world champion (1961–78), was created by FIDE in 1997.

#	Team	Open division	Women's division	Average
1	Russia	1	3	2
2	Ukraine	3	4	3½
3	Georgia	6	2	4

== Notes ==
- 34th Chess Olympiad: Istanbul 2000 OlimpBase
