= Attila Grószpéter =

Hungarian chess grandmaster (born 1960)

Personal information
- Born: 9 June 1960 (age 66) Hódmezővásárhely, Hungary

Chess career
- Country: Hungary
- Title: Grandmaster (1986)
- Peak rating: 2565 (January 1996)
- Peak ranking: No. 70 (January 1983)

Attila Grószpéter (born 9 June 1960) is a Hungarian chess Grandmaster (GM) (1986). He is a World Team Chess Championship silver medalist (1985) and a European Team Chess Championship bronze medalist (1983).

== Biography ==
At the end of the 1970s Attila Grószpéter was one of the best Hungarian chess juniors, representing his country in the World Youth Chess Championship in U16, U18 and U20 age groups and European Junior Chess Championship in U20 age group. In 1978, he made his first appearance in the final of individual Hungarian Chess Championship, sharing 3rd place (together with, among others, Iván Faragó). He repeated this result two years later, sharing the 3rd place with László Hazai, and in 1984 he won the bronze medal in the Hungarian Chess Championship. Attila Grószpéter achieved his greatest successes in these competitions in 1993 and 1995, winning silver medals twice.

Attila Grószpéter has participated in international chess tournaments many times, achieving successes in Plovdiv (1982, 1st place), Copenhagen (1988, shared 2nd place after Rafael Vaganian, Kecskemét (1992, shared 1st place with Konstantin Aseev, 1993, shared 2nd place after Sergey Zagrebelny, with András Adorján, 1994, shared 2nd place after Artur Kogan, together with, among others Zoltan Gyimesi, 1997, shared 2nd place after Zoltán Varga, together with, among others, Artur Jakubiec], Budapest (1993, shared 2nd place; 1995, shared 1st place together with Gyula Sax and Zoltán Varga; 1996, shared 1st place together with István Csom), Vienna (1996, shared 2nd place after Ilia Balinov, together with Petar Popović and Pavel Blatný), Guyli (1998, 1st place), Hampstead (1998, shared 1st place with Steffen Pedersen), Paks (1999, 2nd place after Bu Xiangzhi; 2001, 1st place), Zalakaros (2002, shared 1st place together with, among others, József Horváth and Attila Czebe), Szombathely (2004, shared 1st place) and again in Paks (2007, 1st place).

Attila Grószpéter played for Hungary in the Chess Olympiads:

- In 1982, at second reserve board in the 25th Chess Olympiad in Lucerne (+2, =1, -1),
- In 1984, at second reserve board in the 26th Chess Olympiad in Thessaloniki (+1, =1, -1),
- In 1990, at second board in the 29th Chess Olympiad in Novi Sad (+1, =5, -3).

Attila Grószpéter played for Hungary in the European Team Chess Championships:

- In 1983, at eighth board in the 8th European Team Chess Championship in Plovdiv (+1, =3, -1), and won team bronze medal,
- In 1989, at fourth board in the 9th European Team Chess Championship in Haifa (+5, =3, -1) and won individual silver medal.

Attila Grószpéter played for Hungary in the World Team Chess Championships:

- In 1985, at second reserve board in the 1st World Team Chess Championship in Lucerne (+0, =1, -1) and won team silver medal,
- In 1989, at third board in the 2nd World Team Chess Championship in Lucerne (+2, =4, -0) and won individual gold medal.

Attila Grószpéter played for Hungary in the World Youth U26 Team Chess Championship:

- In 1981, at first board in the 3rd World Youth U26 Team Chess Championship in Graz (+4, =6, -0) and won team bronze medal.

Attila Grószpéter played for Hungary in the Men's Chess Mitropa Cup:

- In 1990, at first board in the 13th Chess Mitropa Cup in Leibnitz (+3, =0, -2) and won team silver medal.

Attila Grószpéter six times played for chess club Zalaegerszegi Csuti-Hydrocomp SK in the European Men's Chess Club Cups (1995–1996, 2001–2004).

In 1979, Attila Grószpéter was awarded the FIDE International Master (IM) title and received the FIDE Grandmaster (WGM) title seven years later. He reached his career highest chess ranking on January 1, 1996 (at that time he had 2565 points), while the highest place on the FIDE world list was the 75th place, which he occupied on July 1, 1990 (with a score of 2555 points). At the same time, he was ranked 5th among Hungarian chess players, after Zoltán Ribli (2610), Gyula Sax (2600), Lajos Portisch (2590) and József Pintér (2565).
