= Hungarian Chess Championship =

Chess tournament

The inaugural Hungarian Chess Championship was held in the city of Győr in 1906. Initially, there was no governing body responsible for its organisation, until the formation of the Hungarian Chess Federation. The HCF first appeared in 1911, but failed to establish itself properly until 1923.

The regularity of the Championship was patchy prior to 1950, due in part to the two world wars and inadequate funding. Since 1949 however, the HCF has been integrated with the Hungarian Sports Federation and so receives state support. Consequently, the Championship has since been held on an annual basis, with only the occasional omission. Exceptionally two consecutive events have occurred in the same year, due to the event being held at the year end.

The events held in 1981, 1984, 1991 and 1997 were all termed Super Championships. In both 1985 and 1988, the traditional national championship was substituted by an open championship and the winner of both editions was the Hungarian IM Béla Perényi.

The venue for the event has mostly been the Hungarian capital city, Budapest. The events held post-World War II carry the official numbering (#) shown below, while the events held prior to 1945 are tagged with the letter 'p' (#p).

The 1999 championship (49th Men's, 47th Women's) was held 1–9 February in Lillafüred. In the men's section, the ten-player single round-robin tournament (average Elo rating 2553) was won by GM Zoltán Almási 6.0/9, a half point ahead of GM Gyula Sax and GM Zoltán Varga. The ten-player women's single round-robin (average Elo 2261) was won by WM Nóra Medvegy on tie-break over IM Ildikó Mádl, both with 6.0/9. Although invited by the Hungarian Chess Federation, some of the strongest Hungarian players chose not to participate in this event, including Susan Polgar, Judit Polgár, Zsófia Polgár, Péter Lékó, Lajos Portisch, and Zoltán Ribli.

== Open section winners ==
#	Year	City	Winner
01p	1906	Győr	Zoltán von Balla
02p	1907	Székesfehérvár	Leó Forgács
03p	1911	Budapest	Zoltán von Balla (2), Zsigmond Barász
04p	1912	Temesvár	Gyula Breyer
05p	1913	Debrecen	Lajos Asztalos
06p	1922	Budapest	Kornél Havasi
07p	1924	Győr	Géza Nagy
08p	1928	Budapest	Árpád Vajda
09p	1931	Budapest	Lajos Steiner
10p	1932	Budapest	Géza Maróczy
11p	1933	Budapest	Esteban Canal
12p	1934	Budapest	Erich Eliskases
13p	1935	Tatatóváros	László Szabó
14p	1936	Budapest	Lajos Steiner (2), Miguel Najdorf
15p	1937	Budapest	László Szabó (2)
16p	1939	Budapest	László Szabó (3)
17p	1941	Budapest	Géza Füster
18p	1942	Budapest	Gedeon Barcza
19p	1943	Diósgyőr	Gedeon Barcza (2)
01	1945	Budapest	Tibor Florián
02	1946	Budapest	László Szabó (4)
03	1947	Budapest	Gedeon Barcza (3)
04	1948	Budapest	Pal Benko
05	1950(1)	Budapest	Gedeon Barcza (4)
06	1950(2)	Budapest	László Szabó (5)
07	1951	Budapest	Gedeon Barcza (5)
08	1952	Budapest	László Szabó (6)
09	1953	Budapest	Béla Sándor
10	1954	Budapest	László Szabó (7)
11	1955	Budapest	Gedeon Barcza (6)
12	1957	Budapest	Gedeon Barcza (7)
13	1958(1)	Budapest	Lajos Portisch
14	1958(2)	Budapest	Lajos Portisch (2)
15	1959	Budapest	László Szabó (8)
16	1961	Budapest	Lajos Portisch (3)
17	1962	Budapest	Lajos Portisch (4)
18	1963	Budapest	István Bilek
19	1964	Budapest	Lajos Portisch (5)
20	1965(1)	Budapest	István Bilek (2)
21	1965(2)	Budapest	Lajos Portisch (6)
22	1966	Budapest	Gedeon Barcza (8)
23	1967/8	Budapest	László Szabó (9)
24	1968/9	Budapest	Győző Forintos
25	1969	Budapest	Péter Dely
26	1970	Budapest	István Bilek (3)
27	1971	Budapest	Lajos Portisch (7)
28	1972	Budapest	István Csom
29	1973	Budapest	Zoltán Ribli
30	1974	Budapest	Zoltán Ribli (2)
31	1975	Budapest	Lajos Portisch (8)
32	1976	Budapest	Gyula Sax
33	1977	Budapest	Gyula Sax (2), Zoltán Ribli (3)
34	1978	Budapest	József Pintér
35	1979	Budapest	József Pintér (2)
36	1980	Budapest	Péter Lukács
37	1981	Budapest	Lajos Portisch (9)
38	1982	Budapest	Attila Schneider
39	1984	Budapest	András Adorján
40	1986	Budapest	Iván Faragó
41	1989	Budapest	Attila Schneider (2)
42	1991	Budapest	Judit Polgár
43	1992	Budapest	András Adorján (2)
44	1993	Gyula	András Adorján (3)
45	1994	Budapest	Csaba Horváth
46	1995	Budapest	Zoltán Almási
47	1996	Budapest	Zoltán Varga
48	1997	Budapest	Zoltán Almási (2)
49	1998	Budapest	Csaba Horváth (2)
50	1999	Lillafüred	Zoltán Almási (3)
51	2000	Budapest	Zoltán Almási (4)
52	2002	Balatonlelle	Róbert Ruck
53	2003	Hévíz	Zoltán Almási (5)
54	2004	Budapest	Ferenc Berkes
55	2005	Kazincbarcika	Zoltán Gyimesi
56	2006	Székesfehérvár	Zoltán Almási (6)
57	2007	Budapest	Ferenc Berkes (2)
58	2008	Nyíregyháza	Zoltán Almási (7)
59	2009	Szeged	Zoltán Almási (8)
60	2010	Szeged	Ferenc Berkes (3)
61	2011	Hévíz	Viktor Erdős
62	2012	Hévíz	Ferenc Berkes (4)
63	2013	Gyula	Ferenc Berkes (5)
64	2014	Zalakaros	Ferenc Berkes (6)
65	2015	Zalakaros	Ádám Horváth
66	2016	Zalakaros	Ferenc Berkes (7)
67	2017	Zalakaros	Richárd Rapport
68	2018	Budapest	Ferenc Berkes (8)
69	2019	Budapest	Zoltán Almási (9)
–	2020	Cancelled due to COVID-19 pandemic	
70	2021	Budapest	Péter Ács
71	2022	Budapest	Péter Prohászka
72	2023	Budapest	Gergely Antal
73	2025	Budapest	Gleb Dudin
74	2026	Nagykanizsa	Bence Korpa

=== Multiple-time winners ===
Titles	Player	Years
9	László Szabó	1935, 1937, 1939, 1946, 1950, 1952, 1954, 1959, 1968
9	Lajos Portisch	1958(1), 1958(2), 1961, 1962, 1964, 1965(2), 1971, 1975, 1981
9	Zoltán Almási	1995, 1997, 1999, 2000, 2003, 2006, 2008, 2009, 2019
8	Gedeon Barcza	1942, 1943, 1947, 1950, 1951, 1955, 1957, 1966
8	Ferenc Berkes	2004, 2007, 2010, 2012, 2013, 2014, 2016, 2018
3	István Bilek	1963, 1965(1), 1970
3	Zoltán Ribli	1973, 1974, 1977
3	András Adorján	1984, 1992, 1993
2	Zoltán von Balla	1906, 1911
2	Lajos Steiner	1931, 1936
2	Gyula Sax	1976, 1977
2	József Pintér	1978, 1979
2	Attila Schneider	1982, 1989
2	Csaba Horváth	1994, 1998

== Women's winners ==
#	Year	City	Winner
p1	1942	Budapest	Józsa Lángos
p2	1943	Budapest	Józsa Lángos
p3	1944	Budapest	Józsa Lángos
1	1947	Tatabánya	Józsa Lángos
	1949	Tatabánya	Józsa Lángos
2	1950	Tatabánya	Józsa Lángos
3	1951	Budapest	Józsa Lángos
4	1952	Budapest	Józsa Lángos
5	1953	Budapest	Jolán Krcsmarik
6	1954	Budapest	Éva Karakas
7	1955	Budapest	Erzsébet Finta
8	1956	Budapest	Éva Karakas
9	1957	Budapest	Irén Hönsch
10	1958	Budapest	Istvánné Bilek
11	1959	Budapest	Jenőné Sillye
12	1960	Budapest	Jenőné Sillye
13	1961	Budapest	Károlyné Honfi
14	1962	Budapest	Éva Karakas
15	1963	Budapest	Istvánné Bilek
16	1964	Budapest	Erzsébet Finta
17	1965	Budapest	Éva Karakas
18	1966	Budapest	Éva Karakas
19	1967	Budapest	Mária Ivánka
20	1968	Budapest	Mária Ivánka
21	1970(1)	Budapest	Mária Ivánka
22	1970(2)	Budapest	Mária Ivánka
23	1971	Budapest	Mária Ivánka
24	1972	Budapest	Mária Ivánka
25	1973	Budapest	Zsuzsa Verőci
26	1974	Budapest	Mária Ivánka
27	1975	Budapest	Éva Karakas
28	1976	Budapest	Éva Karakas
29	1977	Budapest	Zsuzsa Verőci
30	1978	Budapest	Mária Ivánka
31	1979	Budapest	Mária Porubszky
32	1980	Budapest	Zsuzsa Makai
33	1981	Budapest	Tünde Csonkics
34	1982	Budapest	Ilona Kurucsai
35	1983	Budapest	Zsuzsa Verőci
36	1985	Budapest	Ildikó Mádl
37	1986	Budapest	Mária Ivánka
38	1988	Budapest	Erika Sziva
39	1990	Győr	Ildikó Mádl
40	1991	Budapest	Ildikó Mádl
41	1992	Budapest	Rita Atkins
42	1993	Gyula	Ildikó Mádl
43	1995(1)	Budapest	Eva Forgo
44	1995(2)	Budapest	Nóra Medvegy
45	1996	Hévíz	Mónika Grábics
46	1997	Budapest	Nikoletta Lakos
47	1999	Lillafüred	Nóra Medvegy
48	2000	Budapest	Anita Gara
49	2001	Budapest	Anita Gara
50	2002	Budapest	Nikoletta Lakos
53	2003	Budapest	Yelena Dembo
54	2004	Budapest	Szidonia Vajda
55	2005	Szeged	Nikoletta Lakos
56	2006	Szeged	Ticia Gara
57	2007	Budapest	Ticia Gara
58	2008	Visegrád	Anna Rudolf
59	2009	Eger	Anita Gara
60	2010	Nyíregyháza	Anna Rudolf
61	2011	Szeged	Anna Rudolf
62	2012	Kisvárda	Petra Papp
63	2013	Hévíz	Anita Gara
64	2014	Zalakaros	Ildikó Mádl
65	2015	Budapest	Szidonia Vajda
66	2016	Mándok	Anita Gara
67	2017	Zalakaros	Anita Gara
68	2018	Budapest	Bianka Havanecz
69	2019	Budapest	Ticia Gara
–	2020	Cancelled due to COVID-19 pandemic	
–	2021	Cancelled due to COVID-19 pandemic	
70	2022	Budapest	Zsuzsanna Terbe
71	2023	Budapest	Zsóka Gaál
72	2025	Budapest	Szidonia Vajda
73	2026	Budapest	Zsóka Gaál

== Crosstables ==
HUN-ch 42nd Budapest 1991
	Player	Rating	1	2	3	4	5	6	7	8	9	0	Points	TB	Perf.	+/-
1	Judit Polgár (Hungary)	2550	*	½	1	½	½	½	½	1	1	½	6		2648	+12
2	Andras Adorjan (Hungary)	2530	½	*	½	½	1	½	½	½	½	1	5½	23.75	2608	+10
3	Gyula Sax (Hungary)	2600	0	½	*	½	1	1	½	½	1	½	5½	23.25	2600	0
4	Jozsef Horvath (Hungary)	2540	½	½	½	*	½	½	½	1	½	½	5	21.75	2567	+4
5	Zsuzsa Polgar (Hungary)	2535	½	0	0	½	*	1	1	1	½	½	5	20.25	2568	+4
6	Lajos Portisch (Hungary)	2570	½	½	0	½	0	*	1	½	1	½	4½		2526	-6
7	Péter Lukács (Hungary)	2500	½	½	½	½	0	0	*	½	½	½	3½	16.00	2455	-6
8	Tibor Tolnai (Hungary)	2480	0	½	½	0	0	½	½	*	½	1	3½	14.25	2458	-3
9	Attila Grószpéter (Hungary)	2480	0	½	0	½	½	0	½	½	*	1	3½	14.25	2458	-3
10	Ivan Farago (Hungary)	2515	½	0	½	½	½	½	½	0	0	*	3		2412	-13

HUN-ch (Women) 51st Budapest 2001
	Player	Rating	1	2	3	4	5	6	7	8	9	0	Points	TB	Perf.	+/-
1	Anita Gara (Hungary)	2303	*	½	½	½	1	1	½	1	1	1	7		2487	+21
2	Melinda Goczo (Hungary)	2158	½	*	1	0	½	1	0	1	1	1	5	22.00	2324	+20
3	Yelena Dembo (Hungary)	2391	½	0	*	0	1	½	1	1	1	1	5	20.75	2299	-11
4	Mónika Grábics (Hungary)	2295	½	1	1	*	0	0	½	1	1	½	5	20.25	2309	+2
5	Julia Horvath (Hungary)	2294	½	½	0	1	*	½	0	½	1	1	5	20.25	2309	+2
6	Lili Toth (Hungary)	2184	0	0	½	½	½	*	1	½	½	½	5	19.75	2321	+17
7	Ticia Gara (Hungary)	2381	0	0	½	0	1	0	*	1	½	1	4		2223	-19
8	Nikoletta Lakos (Hungary)	2339	½	½	½	0	½	½	0	*	½	½	3½		2187	-19
9	Tünde Csonkics (Hungary)	2227	0	½	0	0	0	½	½	½	*	1	3		2158	-9
10	Olga Adam (Hungary)	2156	0	0	½	1	0	½	0	½	0	*	2½		2120	-5

HUN-ch (Women) 53rd Budapest 2003
	Player	Rating	1	2	3	4	5	6	7	8	9	0	Points	TB	Perf.	+/-
1	Yelena Dembo (HUN)	2390	*	0	1	1	1	1	1	1	½	1	7½		2568	+18
2	Nóra Medvegy (HUN)	2354	1	*	½	½	½	½	1	1	1	1	7		2510	+18
3	Szidonia Vajda (HUN)	2403	0	½	*	½	½	1	½	½	1	1	5½		2367	-4
4	Anita Gara (HUN)	2352	0	½	½	*	½	½	½	1	1	½	5		2332	-2
5	Nikoletta Lakos (HUN)	2372	0	½	½	½	*	½	0	1	1	½	4½	16.75	2291	-10
6	Melinda Goczo (HUN)	2262	0	½	0	½	½	*	1	½	½	1	4½	16.75	2303	+5
7	Ticia Gara (HUN)	2249	0	0	½	½	1	0	*	1	1	½	4½	15.50	2304	+7
8	Maria Ignacz (HUN)	2191	0	0	½	0	0	½	0	*	1	1	3		2191	-1
9	Lili Toth (HUN)	2196	½	0	0	0	0	½	0	0	*	1	2		2093	-11
10	Anna Rudolf (HUN)	2222	0	0	0	½	½	0	½	0	0	*	1½		2029	-20

Average Elo: 2299 <=> Cat: 2

HUN-ch (Women) 57th Eger 2009
	Player	Rating	1	2	3	4	5	6	7	8	9	0	Points	TB	Perf.	+/-
1	Anita Gara (Hungary)	2353	½	*	0	1	½	1	1	1	1	1	7	26.50	2478	+14
2	Ticia Gara (Hungary)	2354	*	½	1	1	½	½	1	½	1	1	7	28.00	2478	+14
3	Petra Papp (Hungary)	2159	0	1	*	0	1	½	1	1	½	½	5½	23.00	2361	+25
4	Nóra Medvegy (Hungary)	2344	½	1	1	*	0	0	½	1	1	½	5½	19.50	2341	0
5	Nikoletta Lakos (Hungary)	2310	½	½	0	1	*	½	0	½	1	1	5	19.25	2305	0
6	Szidonia Vajda (Hungary)	2375	0	0	½	½	½	*	1	½	½	½	5	18.00	2298	-9
7	Anna Rudolf (Hungary)	2313	0	0	½	0	1	0	*	1	½	1	4		2141	-11
8	Eszter Dudas (Hungary)	2141	½	½	½	0	½	½	0	*	½	½	3		2121	+2
9	Sarolta Toth (Hungary)	2236	0	½	0	0	0	½	½	½	*	1	2		2066	-20
10	Mariann Csatari (Hungary)	2117	0	0	½	1	0	½	0	½	0	*	1		2074	-15

HUN-ch (Women) 58th Nyíregyháza 2010
	Player	Rating	1	2	3	4	5	6	7	8	9	0	Points	TB	Perf.	+/-
1	Anna Rudolf (Hungary)	2344	*	0	1	1	½	1	1	1	1	1	7½		2497	+15
2	Lili Toth (Hungary)	2175	1	*	½	1	½	1	0	0	1	1	6	27.25	2357	+23
3	Melinda Goczo (Hungary)	2234	0	½	*	½	1	1	1	½	1	½	6	23.00	2350	+15
4	Nikoletta Lakos (Hungary)	2389	½	1	1	*	0	0	½	1	1	½	5½		2302	+2
5	Petra Papp (Hungary)	2270	½	½	0	1	*	½	0	½	1	1	4½		2227	-5
6	Eszter Hidegh (Hungary)	2146	0	0	½	½	½	*	1	½	½	½	4		2201	+6
7	Veronika Schneider (Hungary)	2339	0	0	½	0	1	0	*	1	½	1	3½		2141	-25
8	Maria Pinterne Kovacs (Hungary)	2139	½	½	½	0	½	½	0	*	½	½	3		2121	-3
9	Klara Varga (Hungary)	2223	0	½	0	0	0	½	½	½	*	1	2½	10.00	2066	-19
10	Boglarka Erdos (Hungary)	2147	0	0	½	1	0	½	0	½	0	*	2½	8.50	2074	-9

HUN-ch (Women) 59th Szeged 2011
	Player	Rating	1	2	3	4	5	6	7	8	9	0	Points	TB	Perf.	+/-
1	Anna Rudolf (Hungary)	2359	*	½	½	½	½	1	1	½	½	1	6	5.00	2370	+2
2	Veronika Schneider (Hungary)	2204	½	*	1	0	½	1	0	1	1	1	6	4.00	2388	+23
3	Ticia Gara (Hungary)	2375	½	0	*	0	1	½	1	1	1	1	6	3.00	2370	0
4	Anita Gara (Hungary)	2340	½	1	1	*	0	0	½	1	1	½	5½	23.25	2332	-1
5	Melinda Goczo (Hungary)	2204	½	½	0	1	*	½	0	½	1	1	5½	21.75	2346	+18
6	Petra Papp (Hungary)	2256	0	0	½	½	½	*	1	½	½	½	5		2300	+6
7	Eszter Dudas (Hungary)	2212	0	0	½	0	1	0	*	1	½	1	4		2228	+2
8	Melinda Varga (Hungary)	2139	½	½	½	0	½	½	0	*	½	½	3½		2196	+6
9	Zsofia Domany (Hungary)	2215	0	½	0	0	0	½	½	½	*	1	2		2049	-19
10	Lili Toth (Hungary)	2216	0	0	½	1	0	½	0	½	0	*	1½		1987	-24

HUN-ch (Women) 60th Kisvarda 2012
	Player	Rating	1	2	3	4	5	6	7	8	9	0	Points	TB	Perf.	+/-
1	Petra Papp (Hungary)	2254	*	½	½	1	1	0	½	1	1	1	6½		2398	+17
2	Ticia Gara (Hungary)	2377	½	*	½	½	1	1	0	1	½	1	6	24.75	2340	-3
3	Eszter Dudas (Hungary)	2243	½	½	*	0	1	1	1	½	½	1	6	24.50	2354	+14
4	Anna Rudolf (Hungary)	2322	0	½	1	*	½	1	0	½	½	1	5	20.75	2264	-7
5	Veronika Schneider (Hungary)	2306	0	0	0	½	*	1	1	½	1	1	5	17.25	2266	-5
6	Boglarka Erdos (Hungary)	2185	1	0	0	0	0	*	1	1	½	1	4½		2240	+7
7	Klara Varga (Hungary)	2210	½	1	0	1	0	0	*	½	½	½	4		2199	-2
8	Barbara Juhasz (Hungary)	2085	0	0	½	½	½	0	½	*	1	½	3½		2173	+9
9	Melinda Goczo (Hungary)	2234	0	½	½	½	0	½	½	0	*	½	3		2115	-15
10	Anna Ruszin (Hungary)	2133	0	0	0	0	0	0	½	½	½	*	1½		1967	-16
