= Károly Sterk =

Károly Sterk (19 September 1881 – 10 December 1946) was a Hungarian chess master.

He tied for 2nd-4th at Budapest 1909 (Zsigmond Barász won), played at Vienna 1909/10 (the 2nd Trebitsch Memorial, Richard Réti won), tied for 3rd-5th at Budapest 1911 (the 3rd Hungarian Championship, Zoltán von Balla and Barász won), tied for 9-11th at Bad Pistyan 1912 (Akiba Rubinstein won), took 10th at Temesvár 1912 (HUN-ch, Gyula Breyer won), took 12th at Budapest 1913 (Rudolf Spielmann won), shared 2nd with Réti, behind Lajos Asztalos, at Debrecen 1913 (HUN-ch), and tied for 2nd-3rd with Barász, behind Breyer, at Budapest 1917. He lost two matches to Géza Maróczy in 1907 and 1917, both (+1 –2 =3).

After World War I, he mainly played in Budapest where took 10th in 1921 (Alexander Alekhine won), tied for 8-9th in 1922, took 3rd and 4th in 1924, shared 1st and took 5th in 1925, tied for 4-5th, took 6th, and won in 1926, tied for 7-8th and took 10th in 1928, tied for 6-7th in 1929, won and shared 1st in 1930, took 2nd in 1931 (HUN-ch, Lajos Steiner won), tied for 12-13th in 1932 (HUN-ch, Maróczy won), and tied for 9-10th in 1934 (Erich Eliskases won).

He also took 9th at Bardejov 1926 (Hermanis Matisons and Savielly Tartakower won), tied for 3rd-4th at London 1927, took 15th at Ujpest 1934 (Andor Lilienthal won), and tied for 11-16th at Tatatóváros 1935 (HUN-ch, László Szabó won).

Sterk played for Hungary in unofficial and official Chess Olympiads at Paris 1924, Budapest 1926, and Prague 1931.
