= Veronika Schneider =

Hungarian chess player

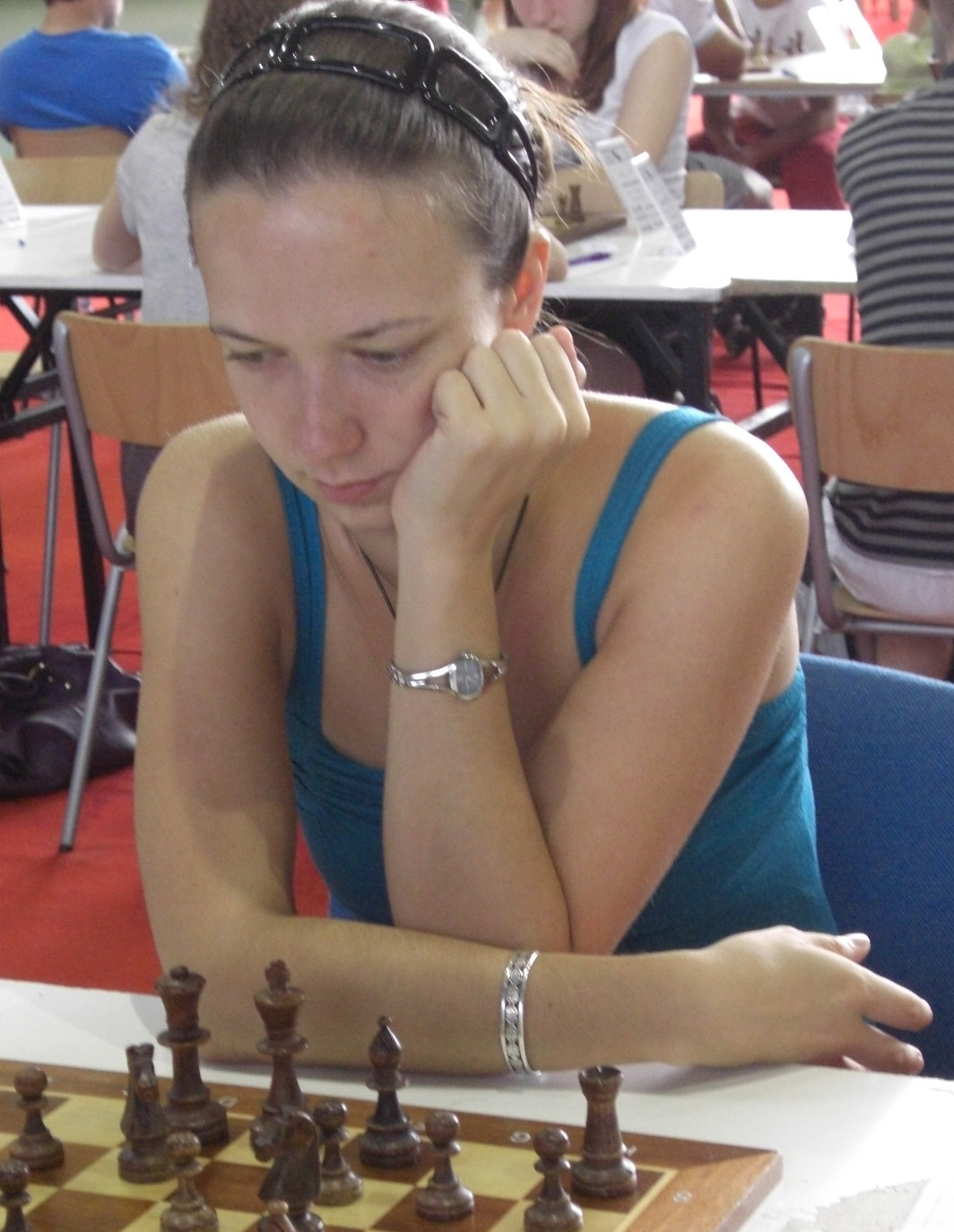

Personal information
- Born: July 17, 1987 (age 38) Budapest, Hungary

Chess career
- Country: Hungary
- Title: Woman Grandmaster (2011)
- FIDE rating: 2248 (October 2017)
- Peak rating: 2339 (May 2010)

Veronika Schneider (born July 17, 1987, in Budapest, Hungary) is a Hungarian chess woman grandmaster. In 2011, she shared first position with Anna Rudolf and Ticia Gara in the Hungarian Women Chess Championship.
