= Artyom Timofeyev =

Artyom Timofeyev may refer to:

- Artyom Timofeev (chess player) (b. 1985), Russian chess player
- Artyom Timofeyev (footballer) (b. 1994), Russian footballer
