= Csaba Horváth (chess player) =

Hungarian chess grandmaster (born 1968)

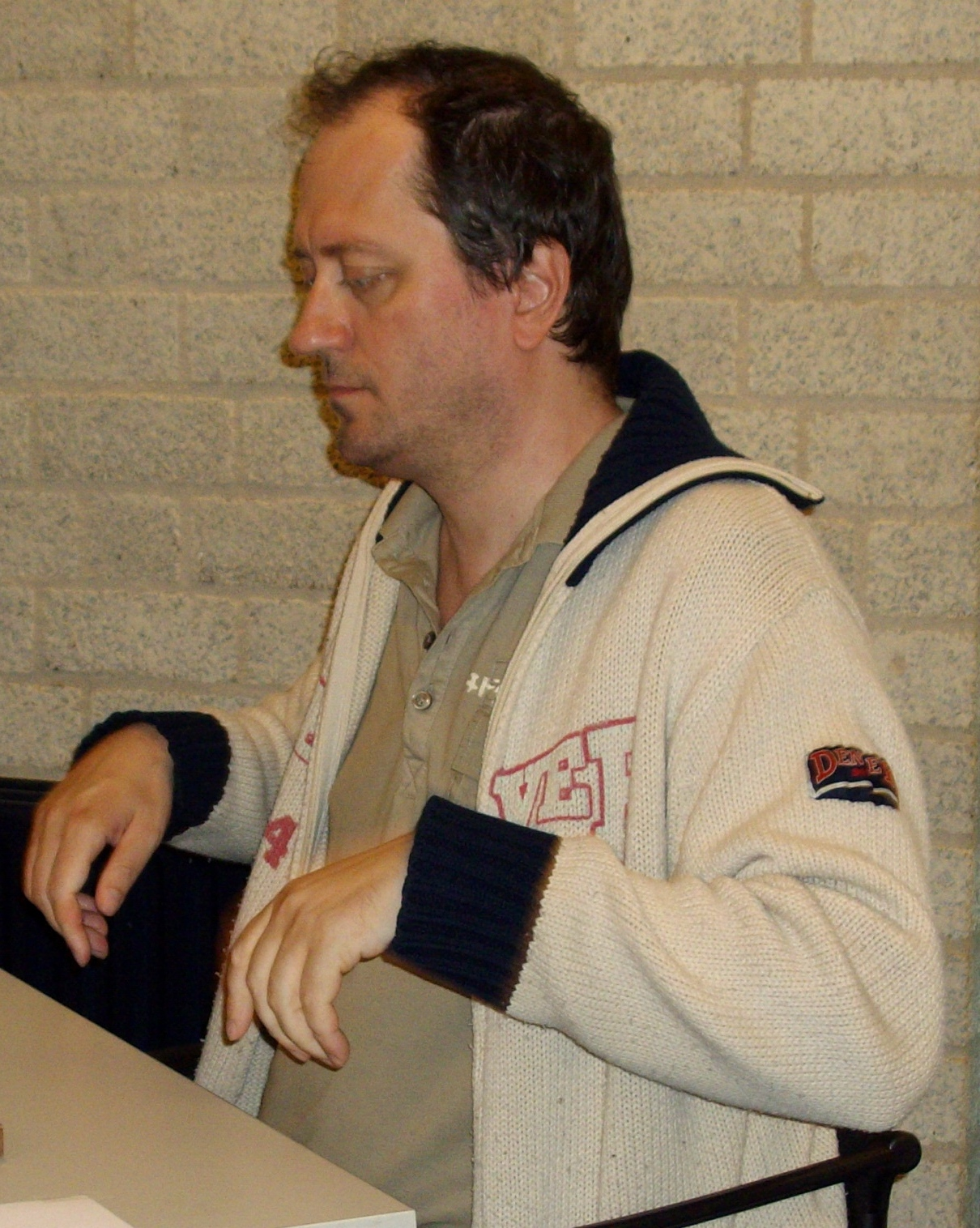
- Csaba Horváth in 2008

Personal information
- Born: 5 June 1968 (age 58) Budapest, Hungary

Chess career
- Country: Hungary
- Title: Grandmaster (1993)
- FIDE rating: 2465 (July 2026)
- Peak rating: 2566 (June 2014)

Csaba Horváth (born 5 June 1968) is a Hungarian Grandmaster (GM) (1993), two-times Hungarian Chess Championship winner (1994, 1998).

== Biography ==
In 1984–1988 Csaba Horváth five times represented Hungary at World Youth Chess Championships and European Youth Chess Championships. He was one of the best Hungarian chess players in the 1990s. Csaba Horváth has competed in the Hungarian Chess Championships finals many times and twice winning gold medals (1994, 1998).

Csaba Horváth has achieved a number of successes in international chess tournaments, including:

- 1990 - Budapest (tournament Noviki - A, 1st place),
- 1991 - Budapest (1st place),
- 1992 - Budapest (1st place), Zalakaros (shared 1st place),
- 1994 - Budapest (First Saturday tournament FS08 GM, 1st place),
- 1995 - Velden (shared 1st place),
- 1996 - Budapest (First Saturday tournament FS05 GM, 1st place),
- 1997 - Budapest (Honved tournament - B, shared 1st place),
- 1998 - Budapest (tournament First Saturday FS12 GM, 1st place),
- 2001 - Chambéry (shared 1st place),
- 2003 - Split (shared 1st place),
- 2004 - Split (1st place), Chambéry (1st place), Zalakaros (1st place),
- 2005 - Val Thorens (1st place),
- 2007 - Havana (Capablanca Memorial - open (shared 1st place), Santa Clara (shared 1st place).

Csaba Horváth played for Hungary in the Chess Olympiads:

- In 1990, at second reserve board in the 29th Chess Olympiad in Novi Sad (+1, =1, -1),
- In 1998, at third board in the 33rd Chess Olympiad in Elista (+1, =8, -0).

Csaba Horváth played for Hungary in the European Team Chess Championship:

- In 1989, at second reserve board in the 9th European Team Chess Championship in Haifa (+0, =0, -1),
- In 1992, at first board in the 10th European Team Chess Championship in Debrecen (+2, =4, -3).

In 1986, he was awarded the FIDE International Master (IM) title and received the FIDE Grandmaster (GM) title seven years later. His brother József Horváth (born 1964) also is chess grandmaster.
