= Ádám Horváth =

Hungarian chess grandmaster (born 1981)

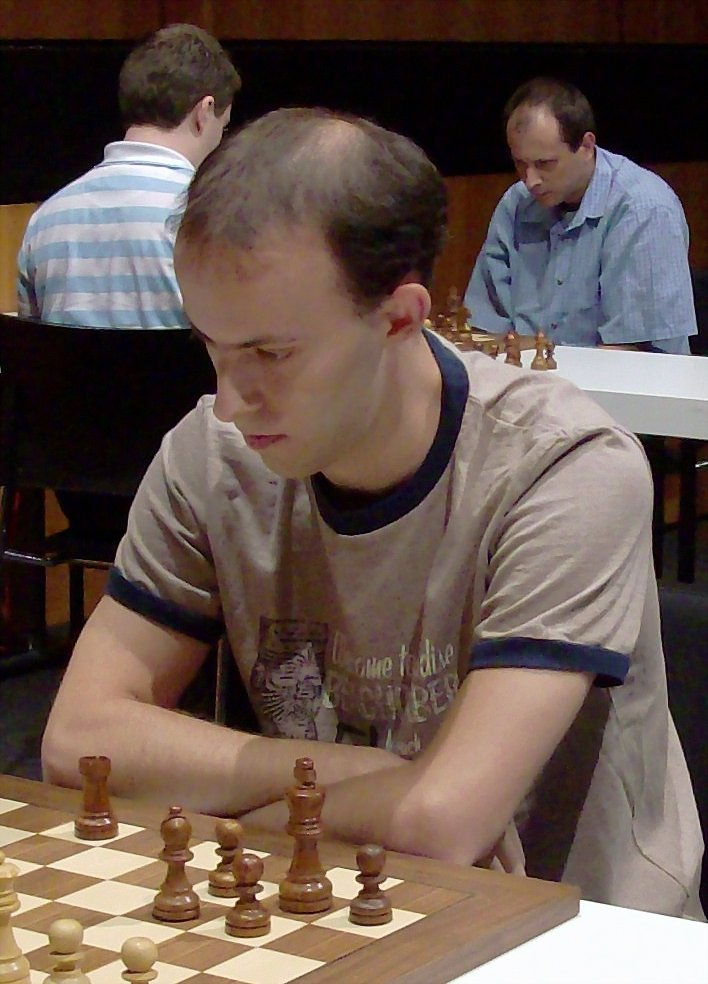
- Ádám Horváth in 2008

Personal information
- Born: 14 July 1981 (age 44)

Chess career
- Country: Hungary
- Title: Grandmaster (2002)
- Peak rating: 2555 (April 2005)

Ádám Horváth (born 14 July 1981) is a Hungarian chess Grandmaster (GM) (2002), Hungarian Chess Championship winner (2015), European Junior Chess Championship winner (2000).

== Biography ==
Ádám Horváth was a multiple medalist of the Hungarian Youth Chess Championships, including gold (1996, U16 age group), silver (1995, U14 age group) and bronze (1997, U16 age group). From 1993 to 2001 he has repeatedly represented Hungary at the European Youth Chess Championship and World Youth Chess Championships in various age groups. Ádám Horváth achieved his best result in 2000, in Avilés, when he won European Junior Chess Championship in U20 age group.

In 2007, he won the silver medal in the Hungarian Chess Championship, losing to Ferenc Berkes in the single-elimination tournament final. In 2015, Ádám Horváth won the Hungarian Chess Championship.

Ádám Horváth is winner of many international chess tournaments, including Paks (1998), Szentgotthárd (2001), Zalakaros (2002), Condom (2003), Harkány (2003, 2004), Balatonlelle (2004), Davos (2004), Balaguer (2005), Metz (2009).

Ádám Horváth played in 2006 for Hungary in the Chess Olympiad, at the second reserve board in the 37th Chess Olympiad in Turin (+0, =4, -0).

In 2002, he was awarded the FIDE Grandmaster (GM) title.
