= Kaido Külaots =

Estonian chess grandmaster (born 1976)

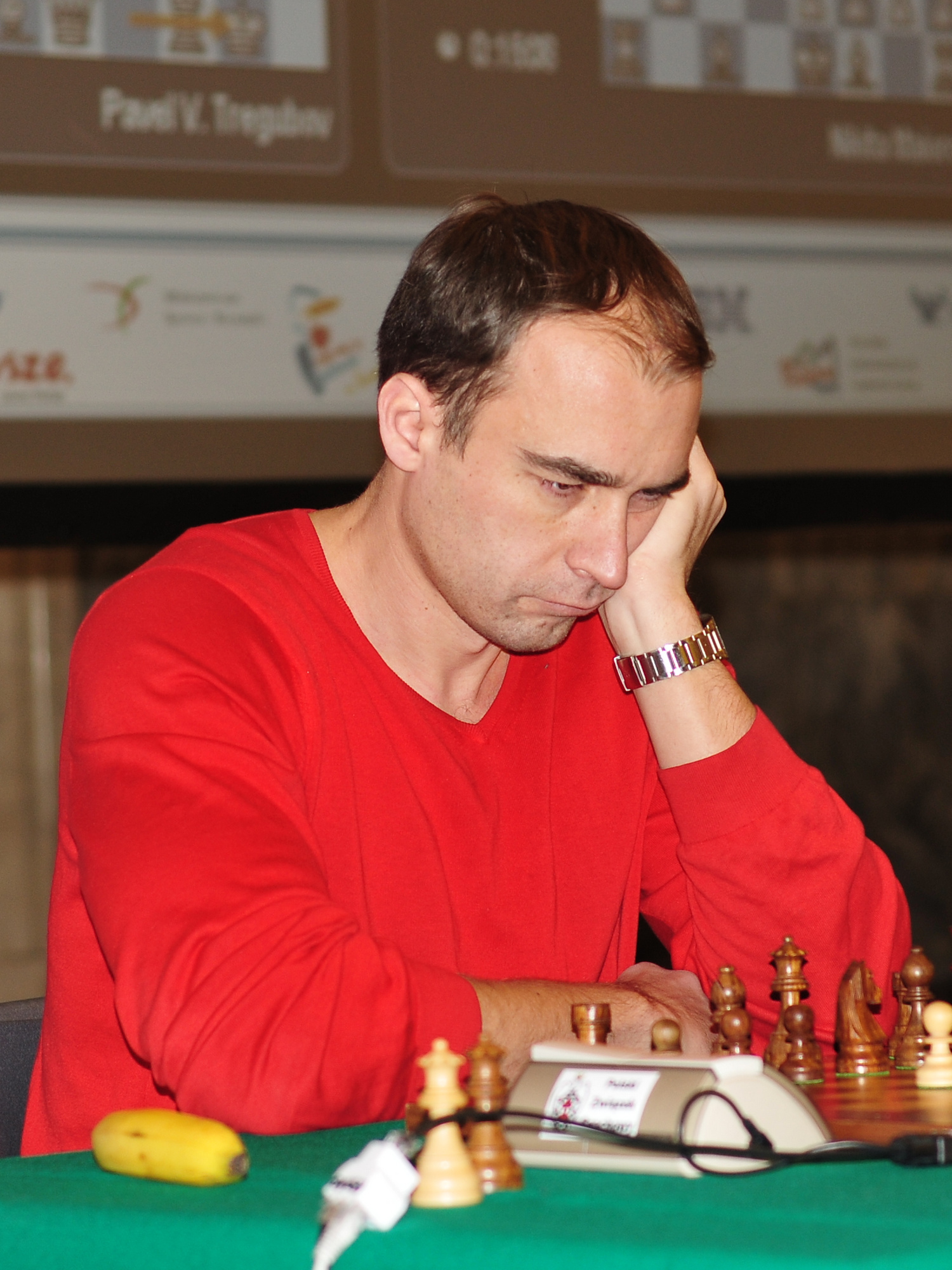
- Külaots at the European Rapid Chess Championship, Warsaw (2013)

Personal information
- Born: 28 February 1976 (age 50) Pärnu, then part of Estonian SSR, Soviet Union

Chess career
- Country: Estonia
- Title: Grandmaster (2001)
- FIDE rating: 2459 (July 2026)
- Peak rating: 2609 (July 2011)

Kaido Külaots (born 28 February 1976) is an Estonian chess player. He was awarded the title Grandmaster by FIDE in 2001.

== Biography ==
He has won the Estonian Chess Championship in 1999, 2001, 2002, 2003, 2008, 2009, 2010, 2014, 2020 and 2023. Külaots has represented Estonia in the Chess Olympiad (in 1998, 2000, 2002, 2004, 2006, 2008, 2010, 2018) and the European Team Chess Championship (in 2003, 2005, 2007, 2019).

He tied for 1st–2nd with Evgeny Alekseev at the Rector Cup, Kharkiv 2003 and with Vladislav Nevednichy at Paks 2003, tied for 1st–6th with Evgeniy Najer, Artyom Timofeev, Zoltan Gyimesi, Sergey Grigoriants and Oleg Korneev at the Cappelle-la-Grande Open 2004, tied for 1st–2nd with Artjom Smirnov at the Paul Keres Chess Festival in Tallinn 2004, came 2nd behind Sergei Tiviakov and ahead of Oleg Korneev at the Gausdal Classics 2005, came 1st at the Heart of Finland Open in Jyväskylä 2008, tied for 1st–3rd with Róbert Ruck and Gabor Papp at the 1st Gedeon Barcza Memorial 2008, tied for 3rd–6th with Šarūnas Šulskis, Tiger Hillarp Persson and Hans Tikkanen at Borup 2010 and won the 1st Festival Gif-sur-Yvette 2010. Külaots competed in the FIDE World Cup in 2017 as a FIDE nominee. Here he was knocked out in the first round after losing to Nikita Vitiugov by ½–1½. In February 2019 Külaots won the Aeroflot Open edging out Haik Martirosyan on tiebreak, after both players scored 7/9 points. Thanks to this victory, Külaots earned an invitation to play in the Dortmund Sparkassen Chess Meeting. Külaots is one of the few players to have a positive lifetime record against World Champion Magnus Carlsen.
