= Zsigmond Barász =

Hungarian chess player

Zsigmond Barász (January 1878 – 28 May 1935, Budapest) was a Hungarian chess master.

He took 2nd, behind Zoltán von Balla, at Győr in 1906 (the first Hungarian Championship) losing one match to him (0.5 : 2.5) there; took 9th at Budapest in 1906 (Leó Forgács won), tied for 1st and 2nd places with Forgács at Budapest in 1907 (the second Hungarian Championship) and took 4th at Székesfehérvár in 1907 (Forgács won).

Barász won at Budapest in 1909, shared 1st place with Balla at Budapest in 1911 (the 3rd HUN-ch), tied for 13th and 14th at Bad Pistyan in 1912 (Akiba Rubinstein won), tied for 8-11th at Breslau 1912 (the 18th DSB Congress, Rubinstein and Oldřich Duras won), tied for 7-8th at Temesvár 1912 (the 4th HUN-ch, Gyula Breyer won), took 11th at Budapest 1913 (Rudolf Spielmann won), took 5th at Debrecen 1913 (the 5th HUN-ch, Lajos Asztalos won), and tied for 2nd-3rd with Károly Sterk, behind Breyer, at Budapest 1917.

== See also ==
- Budapest Gambit § Origins
