= Sergey Grigoriants =

Russian chess grandmaster (born 1983)

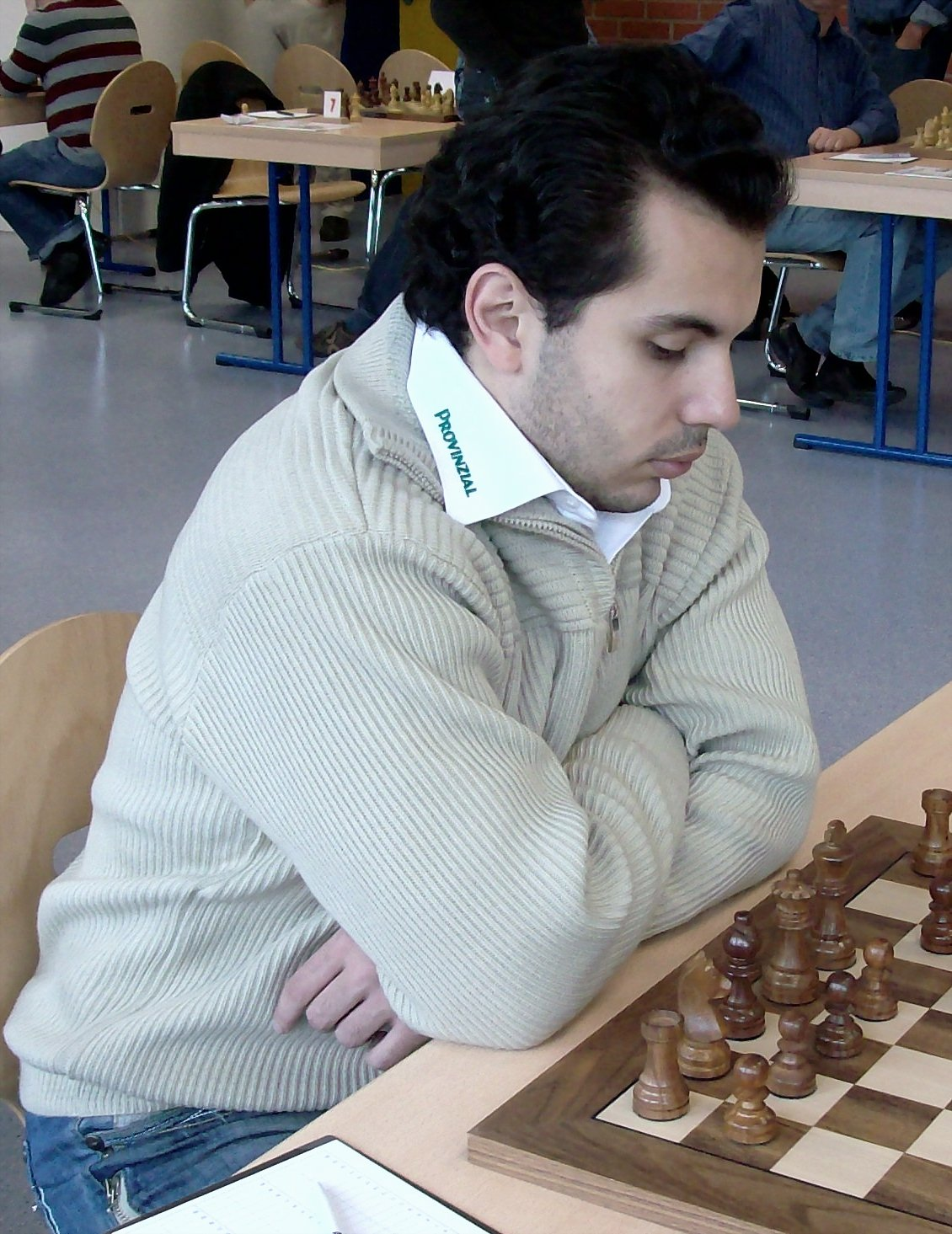
- Grigoriants in 2008

Personal information
- Born: 2 November 1983 (age 42) Tashkent, Uzbek Soviet Socialist Republic, USSR
- Spouse: Petra Papp (m. 2018)

Chess career
- Country: Russia (until 2022); Hungary (since 2022)
- Title: Grandmaster (2003)
- FIDE rating: 2546 (July 2026)
- Peak rating: 2606 (August 2015)

Sergey Mikhailovich Grigoriants (Russian: Сергей Михайлович Григорьянц; born 2 November 1983) is a Russian chess grandmaster who represents Hungary.

== Chess career ==
Grigoriants won the U14 section of the World Youth Championships in 1997 and the U16 section of the European Youth Championships in 1999. In 2004, he shared first place with Evgeny Najer, Kaido Külaots, Artyom Timofeev, Zoltan Gyimesi and Oleg Korneev in the Cappelle-la-Grande Open tournament. The following year, Grigoriants attained the title of Moscow Champion.

In 2006 he scored 7 points out of 10 games, a half point less than the winner, at the 22nd Open tournament in Cappelle-la-Grande.

In 2018 he married the Hungarian chess player Petra Papp.
