= Nikoletta Lakos =

Hungarian chess player

Personal information
- Born: December 14, 1978 (age 47) Budapest, Hungary

Chess career
- Country: Hungary
- Title: Woman Grandmaster (2000)
- Peak rating: 2415 (July 1997)

Nikoletta Lakos (born December 14, 1978, in Budapest, Hungary) is a Hungarian chess woman grandmaster. She is a three-time Hungarian Chess Championship winner, having taken the title in 1997, 2002 and 2005.
