= Tibor Flórián (chess player) =

Hungarian chess player

Personal information
- Born: 2 March 1919 Budapest, Hungary
- Died: 28 January 1990 (aged 70) Budapest, Hungary

Chess career
- Country: Hungary
- Title: International Master (1950)

Tibor Flórián (2 March 1919 – 28 January 1990), né Feldmann, was a Hungarian chess player and chess composer. He received the FIDE titles of International Master (IM) in 1950 and International Arbiter in 1951. Flórián was a Hungarian Chess Championship winner in 1945 and a European Team Chess Championship team bronze medal winner in 1961.

== Biography ==
Flórián was a leader of the Hungarian chess movement. He was General Secretary of the Hungarian Chess Union (1961–1984) and chief editor of the Hungarian chess journal Sakkélet (1983–1984). He was chief arbiter of the 4th Women's Chess Olympiad (1969). He is also known as a chess writer who wrote several chess books. At the age of 15 he published his first chess problem.

In 1945, Flórián won the Hungarian Chess Championship. He later took part in several national championships: 1951 (8th place); 1955 (7th place), 1958 (tie for 4th and 5th places); 1959 (tie for 6th and 7th places). He took part in many international chess tournaments. His best results were:

- Belgrade (1948): tie for 1st and 2nd places
- Bucharest (1949): tie for 4th and 5th
- Bucharest (1951): tie for 3rd and 4th
- San Benedetto del Tronto (1957) – 3rd place.

He was in Hungary's national team in the largest team chess tournaments:

- Chess Olympiad 1952
- European Team Chess Championship 1961; he won a bronze medal in the team event.

In December 1958 he achieved his highest Elo rating of 2554.

He was also active in correspondence chess and took part in the 7th, 8th and 9th correspondence chess olympiads.

== Literature ==
- Florian, Tibor. Védekezés és ellentámadás, ("Defence and counter-attack") Budapest, 1965;
- Florian, Tibor. A legjobb Magyar támadójátszmák ("The best Hungarian attacking games"), Budapest, 1970;
- Florian, Tibor. The Schliemann Variation of the Ruy Lopez. Published by The Chess Player, Nottingham, UK (1970);
- Florian, Tibor. Defence and Counter-Attack. Published by Pergamon, Oxford 1983. ISBN 9780080241432;
- Florian, Tibor. Entscheidung in der Schlussrunde. Ratschläge zur Vorbereitung - Beispiele zur Spieltaktik. ("Decision in the final round. Advice for preparation - Examples of tactical play") Published by Franckh'sche Verlagshandlung, Stuttgart (1987). ISBN 9783440058060.
