= Gyuláné Krizsán-Bilek =

Hungarian chess player (born 1938)

Personal information
- Born: 24 January 1938 (age 88)
- Spouse: István Bilek

Chess career
- Country: Hungary
- Title: Woman International Master (1965)
- Peak rating: 2165 (January 1976)

Gyuláné Krizsán-Bilek (born 24 January 1938), née Krizsán Gyuláné, also Edit Láng, Istvánné Bilek, is a Hungarian chess player who holds the title of Woman International Master (WIM, 1965). She is a winner of the Hungarian Women's Chess Championship (1958).

== Biography ==
From the end of the 1950s to the 1960s, she was one of the leading Hungarian women's chess players. She has won medals in the Hungarian Women's Chess Championships six times: gold (1958), silver (1961) and four bronzes (1955, 1959, 1965, 1966). In 1965, she was awarded the FIDE Woman International Master (WIM) title.

Gyuláné Krizsán-Bilek played for Hungary in the Women's Chess Olympiads:

- In 1963, at second board in the 2nd Chess Olympiad (women) in Split (+4, =4, -3),
- In 1966, at second board in the 3rd Chess Olympiad (women) in Oberhausen (+3, =4, -1) and won the individual silver medal,
- In 1972, at first reserve board in the 5th Chess Olympiad (women) in Skopje (+2, =1, -1) and won the team bronze medal.

Also known as a correspondence chess player. Played for Hungary in 2nd Women's Correspondence Chess Olympiad (1980-1982).

She was married to the Hungarian chess grandmaster István Bilek.
