= Oleg Korneev =

Russian-Spanish chess grandmaster (born 1969)

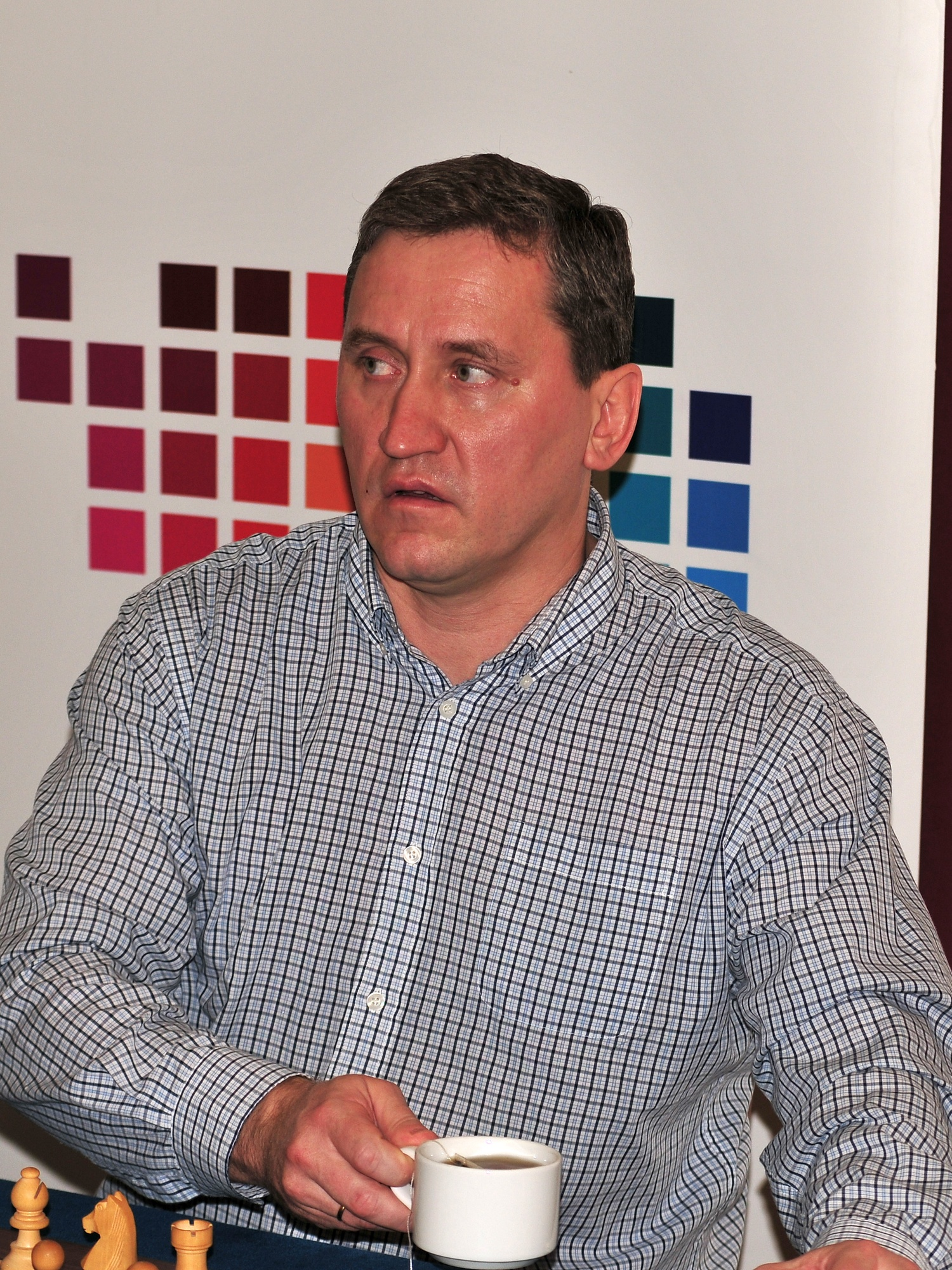
- Korneev in 2013

Personal information
- Born: 25 July 1969 (age 56)

Chess career
- Country: Soviet Union (until 1991); Russia (1991–2012); Spain (since 2012)
- Title: Grandmaster (1995)
- FIDE rating: 2433 (July 2026)
- Peak rating: 2671 (April 2006)
- Peak ranking: No. 34 (April 2006)

Oleg Anatolyevich Korneev (Олег Анатольевич Корнеев; born 25 July 1969) is a Russian chess grandmaster who now represents Spain. He was awarded the Grandmaster title in 1995.

== Chess career ==
Korneev was not a child prodigy, he finished in the lower half of the 1987 Moscow Central Chess Club Championship at the age of 18, and his first published FIDE rating in January 1988 was 2280.

In 2004, Korneev tied for 1st–6th with Evgeniy Najer, Artyom Timofeev, Kaido Külaots, Sergey Grigoriants and Zoltan Gyimesi in the Cappelle-la-Grande Open. In 2013 he tied for 1st–11th with Pavel Eljanov, Dmitry Kokarev, Alexander Areshchenko, Denis Khismatullin, Maxim Matlakov, Dragan Šolak, Vadim Zvjaginsev, Sanan Sjugirov, Ivan Bukavshin and Ildar Khairullin in the Chigorin Memorial in St Petersburg.
