= Béla Sándor =

Hungarian chess player (1919–1978)

Personal information
- Born: 14 December 1919 Budapest, Hungary
- Died: 21 March 1978 (aged 58) Budapest, Hungary

Chess career
- Country: Hungary
- Title: International Master (1964)

Béla Sándor (14 December 1919 – 21 March 1978), was a Hungarian chess International Master (1964), Hungarian Chess Championship winner (1953).

== Biography ==
Béla Sándor was born to a family of Transylvanian origin. He started playing chess competitively in 1938 and in 1945 participated in his first Hungarian Chess Championship final. By 1958, he participated in these tournaments nine times. Béla Sándor ranked 5th in the 1952 Hungarian Chess Championship and won the 9th Hungarian Chess Championship in the following year.

Béla Sándor played for Hungary in the Chess Olympiad:

- In 1954, at fourth board in the 11th Chess Olympiad in Amsterdam (+1, =4, -1).

In 1958, in Beverwijk Béla Sándor won the International Chess tournament. In 1964, he was awarded the FIDE International Master (IM) title.

Béla Sándor worked as a chess trainer in later years. In 1957, he was the leader and trainer of Hungarian team at the 1st Women's Chess Olympiad. In 1964, Béla Sándor worked as a consultant trainer for the Hungarian national team at the 16th Chess Olympiad in Tel Aviv. Between 1965 and 1967 he was the inspector of the Hungarian Chess Association.
