= Józsa Lángos =

Hungarian chess player

Personal information
- Born: 28 August 1911 Tatabánya, Hungary
- Died: 17 May 1987 (aged 75) Tatabánya, Hungary

Chess career
- Country: Hungary
- Title: Woman International Master (1950)

Józsa Lángos (28 August 1911 – 17 May 1987) was a Hungarian chess player who held the title of Woman International Master (WIM, 1950). She was an eight-time winner of the Hungarian Women's Chess Championship (1942, 1943, 1944, 1947, 1949, 1950, 1951, 1952).

== Biography ==
In the 1940s and the 1950s, Józsa Lángos was one of the leading Hungarian women's chess players. She won in unofficial Hungarian Women's Chess Championships in 1942, 1943, 1944 and 1949. Józsa Lángos won in official Hungarian Women's Chess Championships in 1947, 1950, 1951 and 1952.

In 1950, Józsa Lángos participated at Women's World Chess Championship in Moscow where shared 10th-11th place. In 1952, Józsa Lángos participated at Women's World Chess Championship Candidates Tournament in Moscow where shared 8th-10th place.

In 1950, Józsa Lángos was awarded the FIDE Woman International Master (WIM) title. She was the first Hungarian woman to receive this title.
