= Nóra Medvegy =

Hungarian chess player (born 1977)

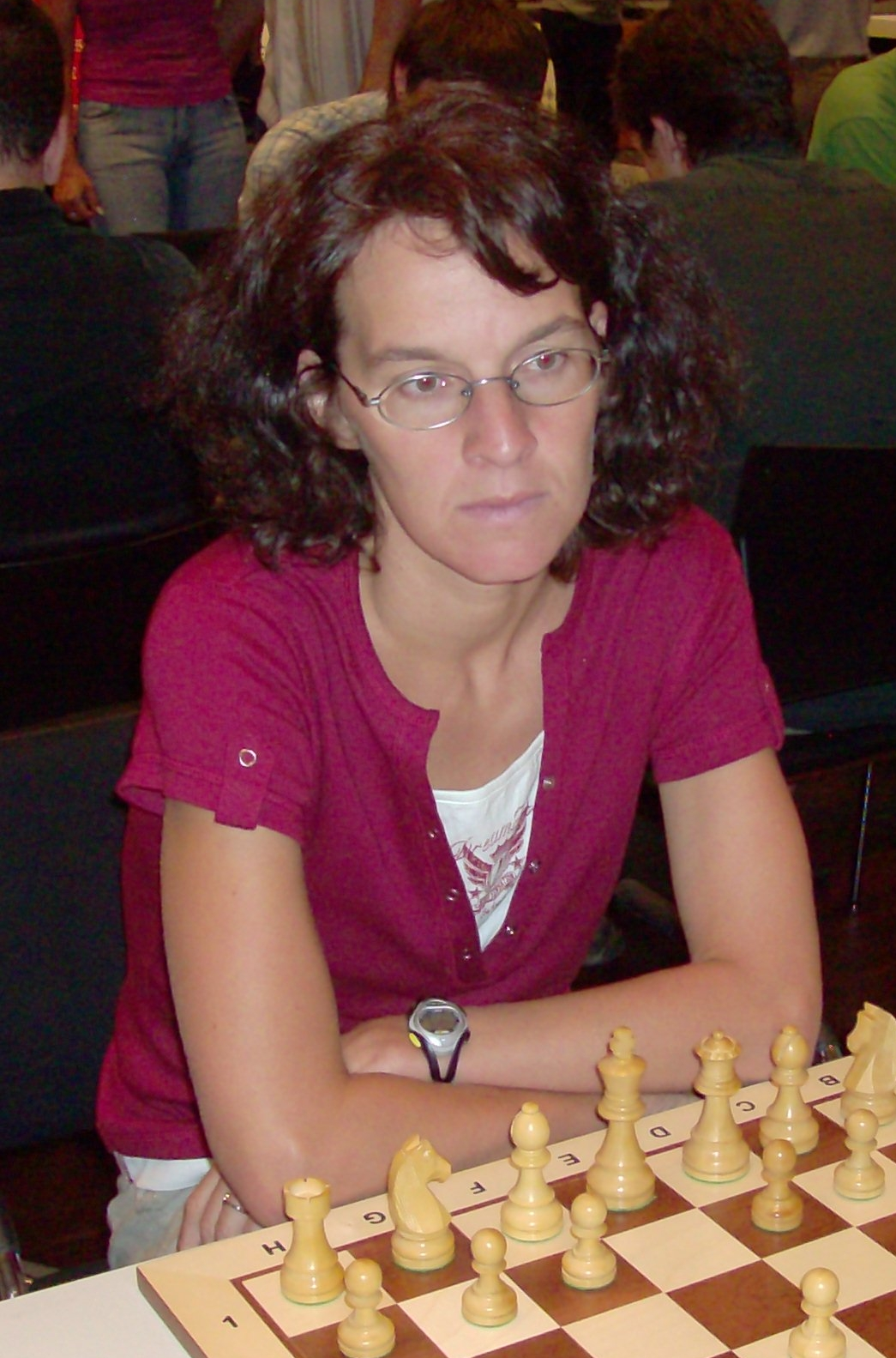

Personal information
- Born: 29 March 1977 (age 49) Tatabánya, Hungary
- Spouse: Zoltan Gyimesi

Chess career
- Country: Hungary
- Title: International Master (2005); Woman Grandmaster (2002)
- Peak rating: 2407 (July 2004)

Nóra Medvegy (born 29 March 1977) is a Hungarian chess player who holds the FIDE titles of Woman Grandmaster (WGM, 2002) and International Master (IM, 2005). She is a two-time winner of the Hungarian Women's Chess Championship (1995, 1999).

== Biography ==
In 1994, Nóra Medvegy won Hungarian Youth Chess Championship in girl's U18 age category. She repeatedly represented Hungary at the European Youth Chess Championships and World Youth Chess Championships in different age groups, where in 1995 won bronze medal in European Youth Chess Championship in girl's U18 age category. Since the mid-90s, Nóra Medvegy has been one of the leading Hungarian chess players. Hungarian Women's Chess Championship multiple participant in which she has won 2 gold (1995, 1999), 2 silver (2003, 2007) and 2 bronze (1997, 2002) medals. In 2002, she shared 1st place in international chess tournament Elekes in Budapest. In 2003, she was leading female chess player in Open tournament GibTelecom Masters in Gibraltar Chess Festival.

Nóra Medvegy played for Hungary in the Women's Chess Olympiads:

- In 1996, at third board in the 32nd Chess Olympiad (women) in Yerevan (+1, =2, -2),
- In 1998, at first reserve board in the 33rd Chess Olympiad (women) in Elista (+5, =1, -1).

Nóra Medvegy played for Hungary in the European Team Chess Championship:

- In 2005, at third board in the 6th European Team Chess Championship (women) in Gothenburg (+1, =1, -4).

In 2002, she was awarded the FIDE Woman Grandmaster (WGM) title, and received the FIDE International Master (IM) title three year later.

Nóra Medvegy is married to Hungarian chess player and Grandmaster (GM) Zoltan Gyimesi.
