= Anita Gara =

Hungarian chess player (born 1983)

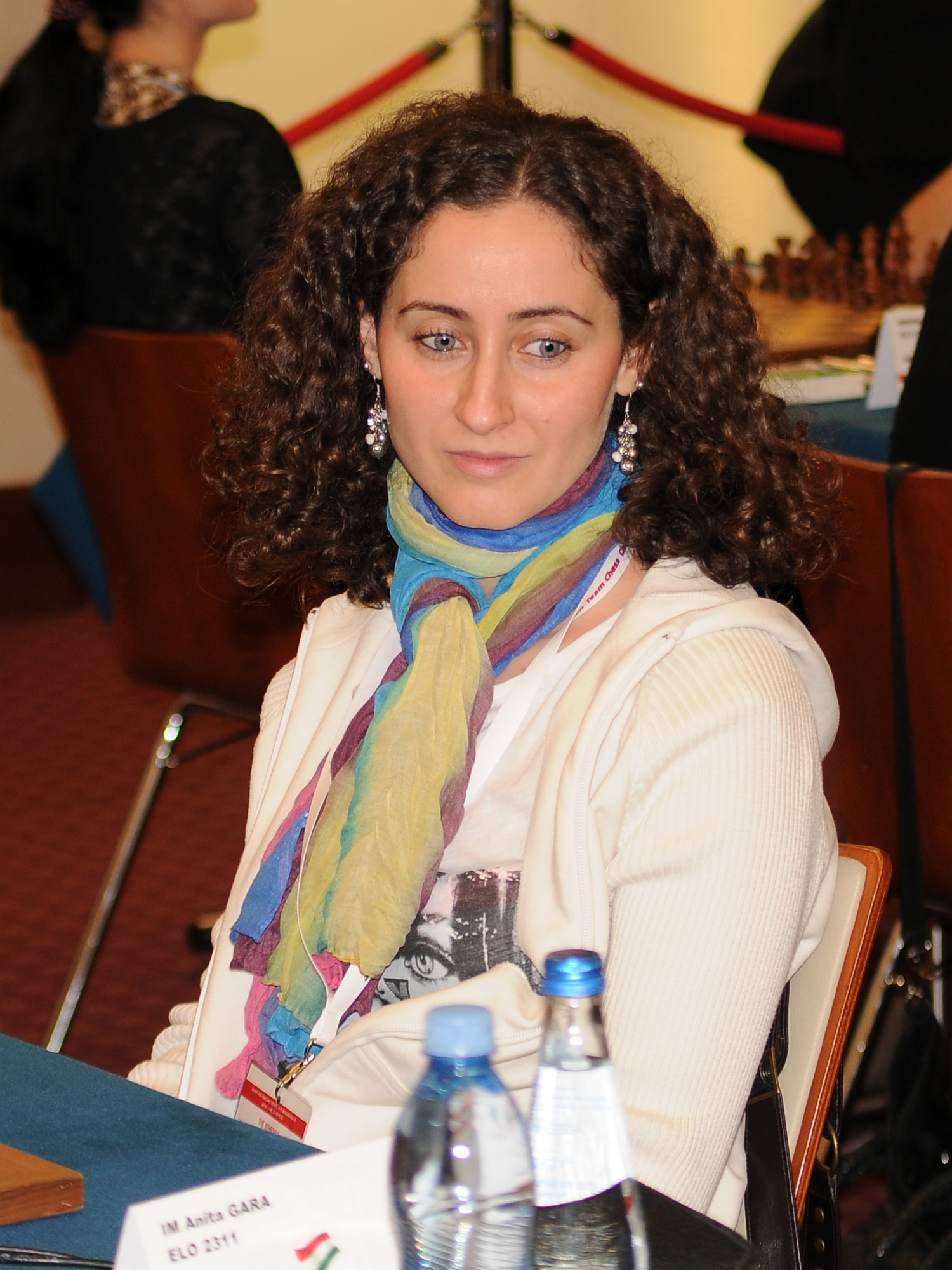
- Gara in 2013

Personal information
- Born: 4 March 1983 (age 43) Budapest, Hungary

Chess career
- Country: Hungary
- Title: International Master (2009); Woman Grandmaster (2001)
- Peak rating: 2405 (January 2005)

Anita Gara (born 4 March 1983) is a Hungarian chess player. She holds the FIDE titles of International Master (IM) and Woman Grandmaster (WGM). She is six-time Hungarian women's champion (2000, 2001, 2009, 2013, 2016, and 2017). Gara competed in the Women's World Chess Championship in 2018.

Gara has played for the Hungarian team in the Women's Chess Olympiad, Women's World Team Chess Championship, Women's European Team Chess Championship and European Girls U18 Team Chess Championship. She won an individual bronze medal playing on board five in the 2016 Women's Chess Olympiad, held in Baku.

Her sister is Ticia Gara, also a chess player.
