= István Bilek =

Hungarian chess grandmaster (1932–2010)

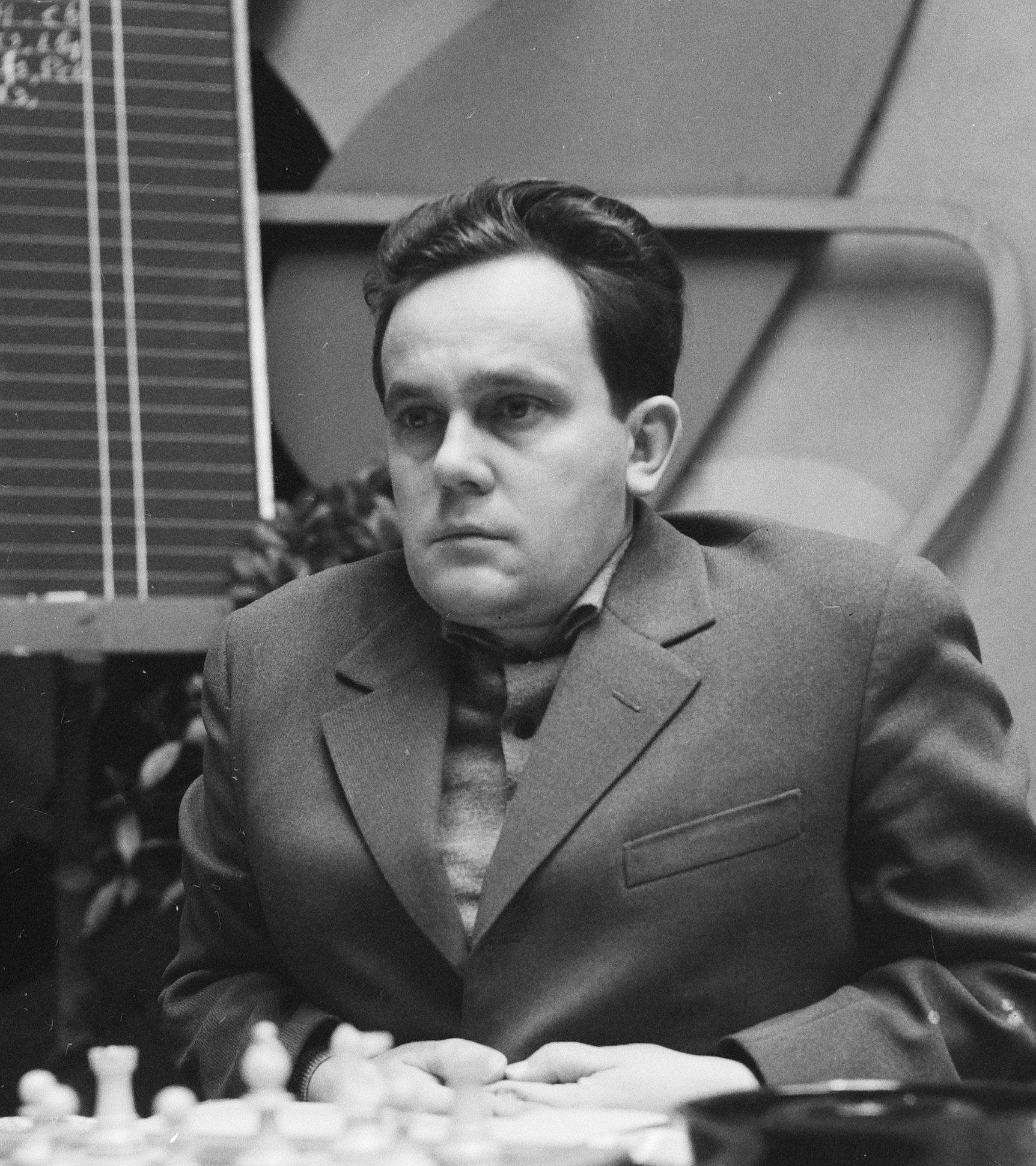
- Bilek in 1966

Personal information
- Born: 11 August 1932 Budapest, Hungary
- Died: 20 March 2010 (aged 77)
- Spouse: Gyuláné Krizsán

Chess career
- Country: Hungary
- Title: Grandmaster (1962)
- Peak rating: 2500 (July 1973)
- Peak ranking: No. 75 (July 1973)

István Bilek (11 August 1932 – 20 March 2010) was a Hungarian chess grandmaster. He was a three-time Hungarian Chess Champion.

== Biography ==
Bilek was a three-time Hungarian Champion (1963, 1965, and 1970), and he played in interzonals in 1962 and 1964. His most successful tournaments were Balatonfüred (1960), Salgótarján (1967), and Debrecen (1970). He placed first in all three.

Bilek played on the Hungarian team in nine Chess Olympiads (1958 through 1974), earning three individual medals: silver on board 4 in 1962, bronze on board 3 in 1966, and silver on board 2 in 1972.

Bilek was awarded the International Master title in 1958 and the GM title in 1962.

== See also ==
- Milan Matulović
