= Mónika Grábics =

Hungarian chess player (born 1976)

Personal information
- Born: 31 August 1976 (age 49) Budapest, Hungary

Chess career
- Country: Hungary
- Title: Woman Grandmaster (2003)
- FIDE rating: 2335 (July 2012)
- Peak rating: 2371 (October 2000)

Mónika Grábics (born 31 August 1976) is a Hungarian chess player who received the FIDE title of Woman Grandmaster (WGM) in 2003. She won the Hungarian Women's Chess Championship in 1996. After retiring from professional chess playing Monika started gambling and gaming consulting business BettingSharks.

== Biography ==
In the late 1980s and early 1990s Mónika Grábics repeatedly represented Hungary at the European Youth Chess Championships and World Youth Chess Championships in different age groups, where she won six medals: gold (in 1994, at the European Youth Chess Championship in the U18 girls age group), silver (in 1988, at the World Youth Chess Championship in the U12 girls age group) and four bronze (in 1990, at the World Youth Chess Championship in the U14 girls age group, in 1991 and 1992, at the European Youth Chess Championship in the U16 girls age group, in 1992, at the World Youth Chess Championship in the U16 girls age group).

In 1996, Grábics won Hungarian Women's Chess Championship. She is the winner of many international chess tournaments, including the first prize in the International Chess Tournament in Budapest in 1999. Also she won the International Women's Chess Tournament in 2004 in Rijeka and she shared first place in the International Women's Chess Tournament in Krk in 2003.

She played for Hungary in the Women's Chess Olympiads:

- In 1998, at third board in the 33rd Chess Olympiad (women) in Elista (+6, =1, -2),
- In 2000, at third board in the 34th Chess Olympiad (women) in Istanbul (+2, =4, -2).

Grábics played for Hungary in the European Team Chess Championships:

- In 1992, at second board in the 1st European Team Chess Championship (women) in Debrecen (+4, =2, -3),
- In 1997, at second board in the 2nd European Team Chess Championship (women) in Pula (+3, =3, -1),
- In 1999, at first reserve board in the 3rd European Team Chess Championship (women) in Batumi (+0, =1, -2).
