= Petra Papp =

Hungarian chess player (born 1993)

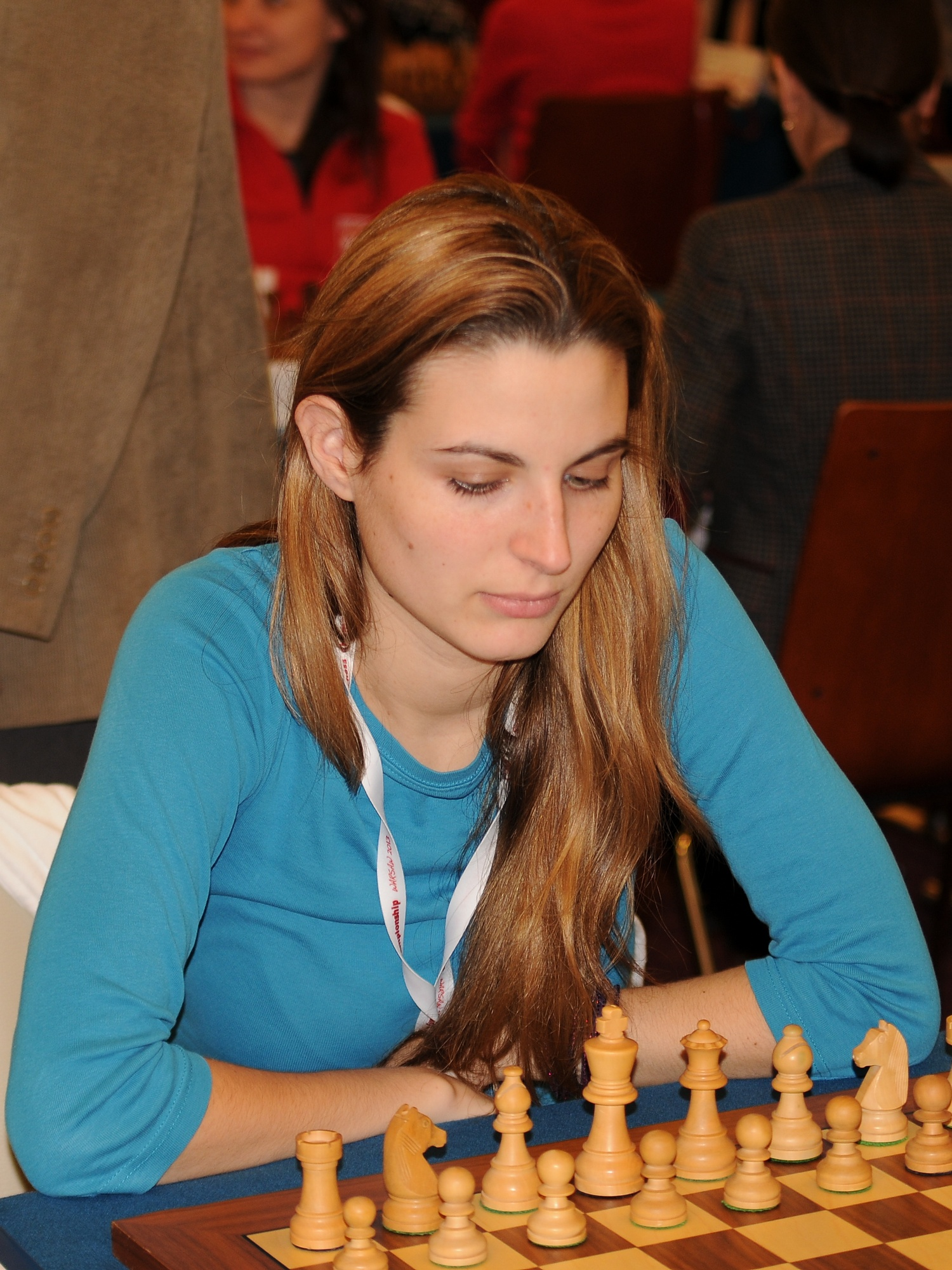
- Papp in 2013

Personal information
- Born: 22 August 1993 (age 32) Szeged, Hungary
- Spouse: Sergey Grigoriants (m. 2018)

Chess career
- Country: Hungary
- Title: Woman Grandmaster (2012)
- Peak rating: 2378 (April 2017)

Petra Papp (Hungarian: Papp Petra; born 22 August 1993) is a Hungarian chess player who holds the FIDE title of Woman Grandmaster (WGM, 2012).

== Chess career ==
In 2009, Papp won the Hungarian Youth Chess Championship in the Under 16 category. She represented Hungary several times in the European Youth Chess Championships and the World Youth Chess Championships. In Iași, she won an individual gold medal and team silver medal in the 2011 European Girls' U18 Team Chess Championship.

In the Hungarian Women's Chess Championships, Papp won gold (2012) and bronze (2009) medals.

Papp played for Hungary in the Women's Chess Olympiads:

- In 2012, at reserve board in the 40th Chess Olympiad (women) in Istanbul (+5, =3, -1),
- In 2014, at reserve board in the 41st Chess Olympiad (women) in Tromsø (+2, =4, -1),
- In 2016, at third board in the 42nd Chess Olympiad (women) in Baku (+2, =6, -0).

Papp played for Hungary in the European Team Chess Championship:

- In 2013, at fourth board in the 10th European Team Chess Championship (women) in Warsaw (+4, =2, -2),
- In 2015, at fourth board in the 11th European Team Chess Championship (women) in Reykjavík and won individual bronze medal (+5, =2, -1).

In 2010, she was awarded the FIDE Woman International Master (WIM) title and received the Woman Grandmaster (WGM) title two years later.
