= Irén Hönsch =

Hungarian chess player (1932–2021)

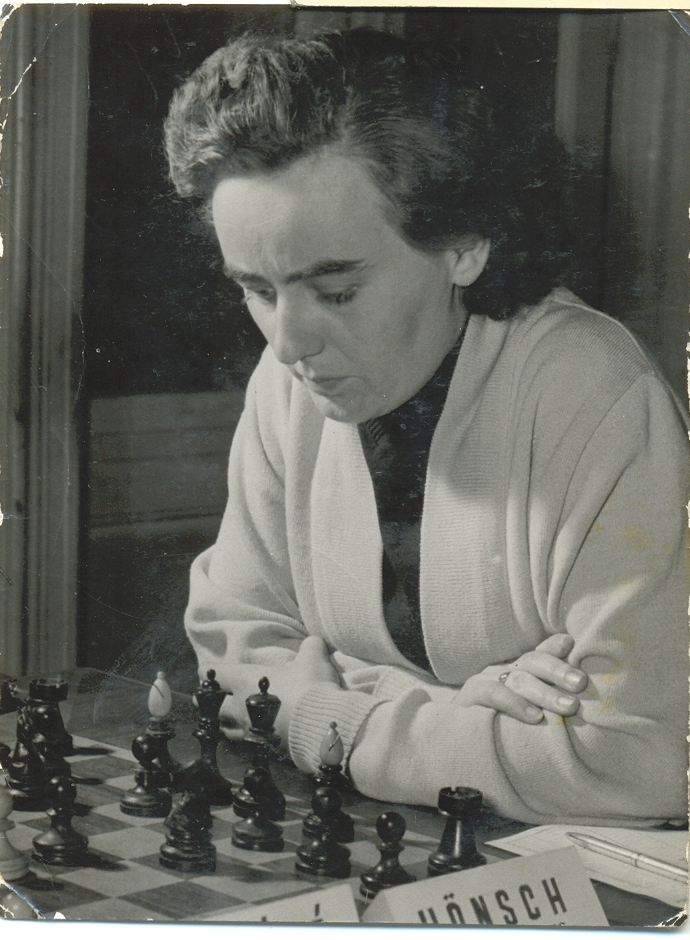
- Irén Hönsch in 1957

Personal information
- Born: May 24, 1932 Košice, Czechoslovakia
- Died: August 26, 2021 (aged 89) Budapest, Hungary

Chess career
- Country: Hungary

Irén Hönsch (24 May 1932 – 26 August 2021) was a Hungarian chess player. She was a three-time winner of the Hungarian Women's Chess Championship (1957, 1959, 1960).

== Biography ==
In the 1950s and 1960s, Irén Hönsch was one of the leading Hungarian women's chess players. She won the Hungarian Women's Chess Championships in 1957, 1959, and 1960.

She also represented Hungary at the Women's Chess Olympiads:

- In 1957, she played at the first board in the 1st Chess Olympiad (women) held in Emmen.

In 1957, Hönsch married Hungarian chess master Jenő Sillye, with whom she had two sons: Gábor (born 1959) and Kálmán (born 1960). Later, she married Lajos Károly and had a daughter, Irén (born 1973). Hönsch died on 26 August 2021, at the age of 89.
