= Attila Schneider =

Hungarian chess player

Personal information
- Born: 14 April 1955 Budapest, Hungary
- Died: 7 July 2003 (aged 48)

Chess career
- Country: Hungary
- Title: International Master (1984)
- Peak rating: 2445 (January 1987)

Attila Schneider (14 April 1955 – 7 July 2003) was a Hungarian chess International Master (1984). He was a Hungarian Chess Championship twice winner (1982, 1989) and a European Team Chess Championship bronze medalist (1983).

== Biography ==
In the 1980s Attila Schneider was one of the top Hungarian chess players. He competed many times in the finals of the individual Hungarian Chess Championship and twice in 1982 and 1989 won gold medals.

His successes in international chess tournaments include: in Delmenhorst (1986, shared 3rd place), Hamburg (1987, HSV, 1st place), as well as many times in Budapest (1981, Elekes mem-A, shared 1st place, 1987, Noviki-C, shared 1st place, 1991, Escom IM-B, shared 2nd place, 1991, Cansys IM-B, 1st place, 1993, Budapest FS07 IM-A, shared 2nd place, 1993, Budapest FS09 IM-A, shared 2nd place, 1997, Budapest FS08 IM, shared 1st place, 1999, Budapest FS04 IM-B, 1st place, 2002, Budapest FS09 IM-B, 2nd place.).

Attila Schneider played for Hungary in the European Team Chess Championship:

- In 1983, at first reserve board in the 8th European Team Chess Championship in Plovdiv (+3, =1, -1), and won team bronze medal.

Attila Schneider played for chess club Spartacus Budapest in the European Men's Chess Club Cups:

- In 1982, in the 3rd European Chess Club Cup (+3, =1, -0) and won team tournament,
- In 1984, in the 4th European Chess Club Cup (+0, =4, -2),
- In 1986, in the 5th European Chess Club Cup (+3, =1, -2).

In 1984, Attila Schneider was awarded the FIDE International Master (IM) title. The highest chess ranking in his career was reached on January 1, 1987, with a score of 2445 points he was ranked 15th among Hungarian chess players at the time.

== Chess writer ==
Attila Schneider chess literary activity is also very rich. His first work, written with László Sápi, is The Dragon's Path. After that, several successful books were published, in addition to which he also launched his trilingual website, the Chess Clinic.

- Journey of the Dragon I-IV
- The semi-open openings
- Semi-Open Games, Caissa Chess Books, Kecskemét, 2003
- The art of matting
- The treasure house of openings - Open openings 1. e4 e5., Caissa Chess-Könyvkiadó, Kecskemét, 2002
- The romance of chess, Kalandor publishing house, 2004. ISBN 963-955-710-2
- The Sicilian Defense I.
- The Sicilian defense II., Caissa Kft., Kecskemét (2004)
- Chess cafe - Open: from 2 moves to 10, Caissa Kft., Kecskemét, 1999
