= Éva Karakas =

Hungarian chess player (1922–1995

Personal information
- Born: Éva Fürst; 15 February 1922 Budapest, Hungary
- Died: 7 May 1995 (aged 73) Budapest, Hungary

Chess career
- Country: Hungary
- Title: Woman Grandmaster (1982)
- Peak rating: 2205 (July 1973)

Éva Karakas (née Fürst; 15 February 1922 – 7 May 1995) was a Hungarian chess player. She won the Women's Hungarian Chess Championship in 1954, 1956, 1962, 1965–66 and 1975–76, and the Women's World Senior Chess Championship in 1991, 1992 and 1994. She played for the Hungarian national team in the first three editions of the Women's Chess Olympiad, held in 1957, 1963 and 1966.

Karakas competed in the Women's World Championship Candidates' Tournament in 1959, 1961, and 1964. She participated in the Women's Interzonal tournament in 1973.
