= Szidonia Vajda =

Hungarian chess player (born 1979)

Vajda Szidónia
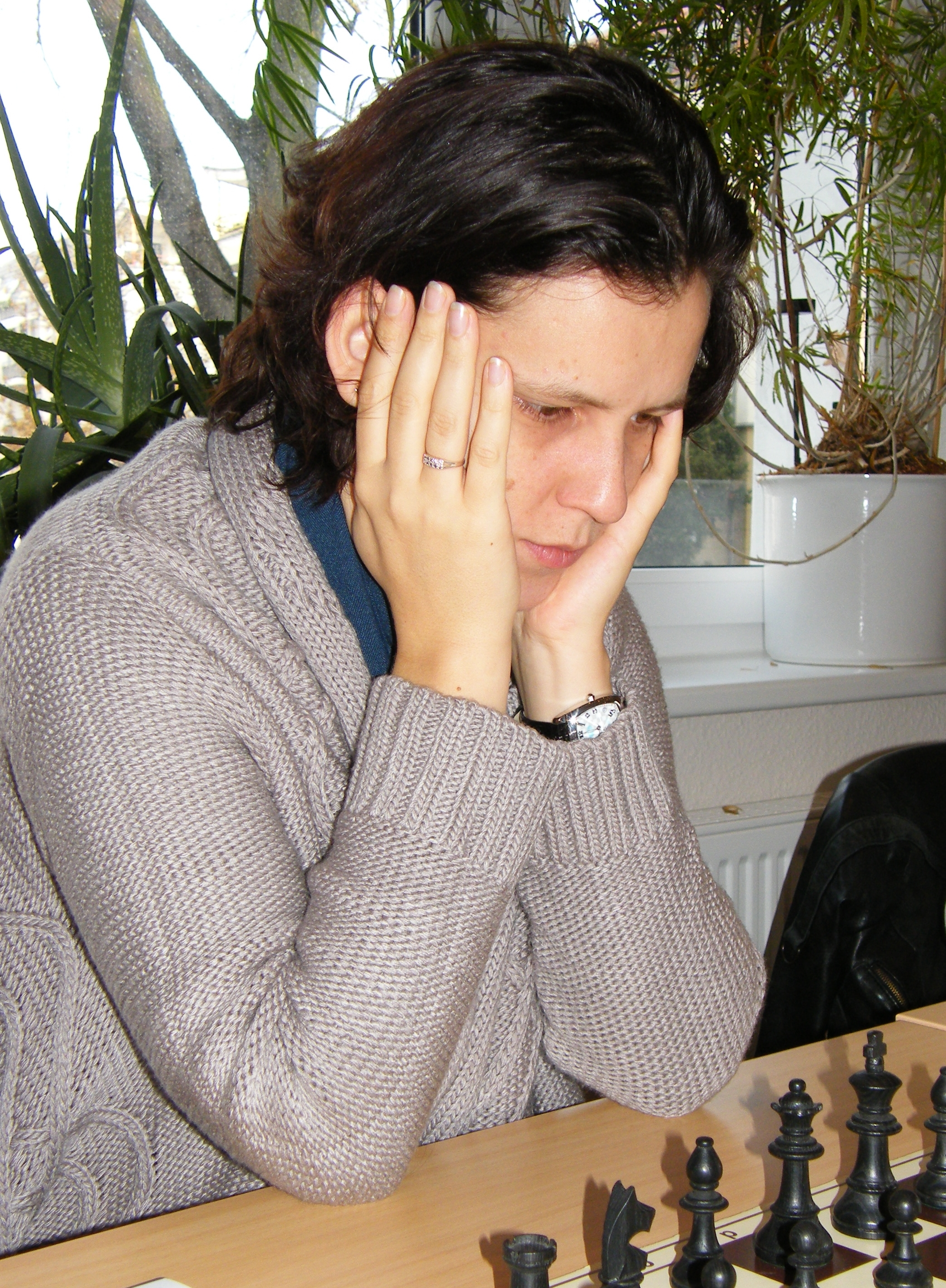

Personal information
- Born: Lázárné Vajda Szidónia; 20 January 1979 (age 47) Odorheiu Secuiesc, Romania

Chess career
- Country: Hungary
- Title: International Master (2003); Woman Grandmaster (1998)
- Peak rating: 2418 (January 2008)

Szidónia Lázárné Vajda (née Vajda; born 20 January 1979) is a Romanian-Hungarian chess player with the FIDE titles of International Master (IM) and Woman Grandmaster (WGM). She won the women's Hungarian Chess Championship in 2004, 2015 and 2025.

In 1995 she won the Under-16 girls' section of the European Youth Chess Championship.

She played in the bronze medal-winning Romanian team in the 3rd Women's European Team Chess Championship in Batumi 1999 and played for Hungary in the Women's Chess Olympiads of 2002, 2004, 2006 and 2008.

In 2009, she won the 1st Teller Ede Memorial in Paks.

She is the sister of GM Levente Vajda.
