= Levente Vajda =

Romanian chess grandmaster (born 1981)

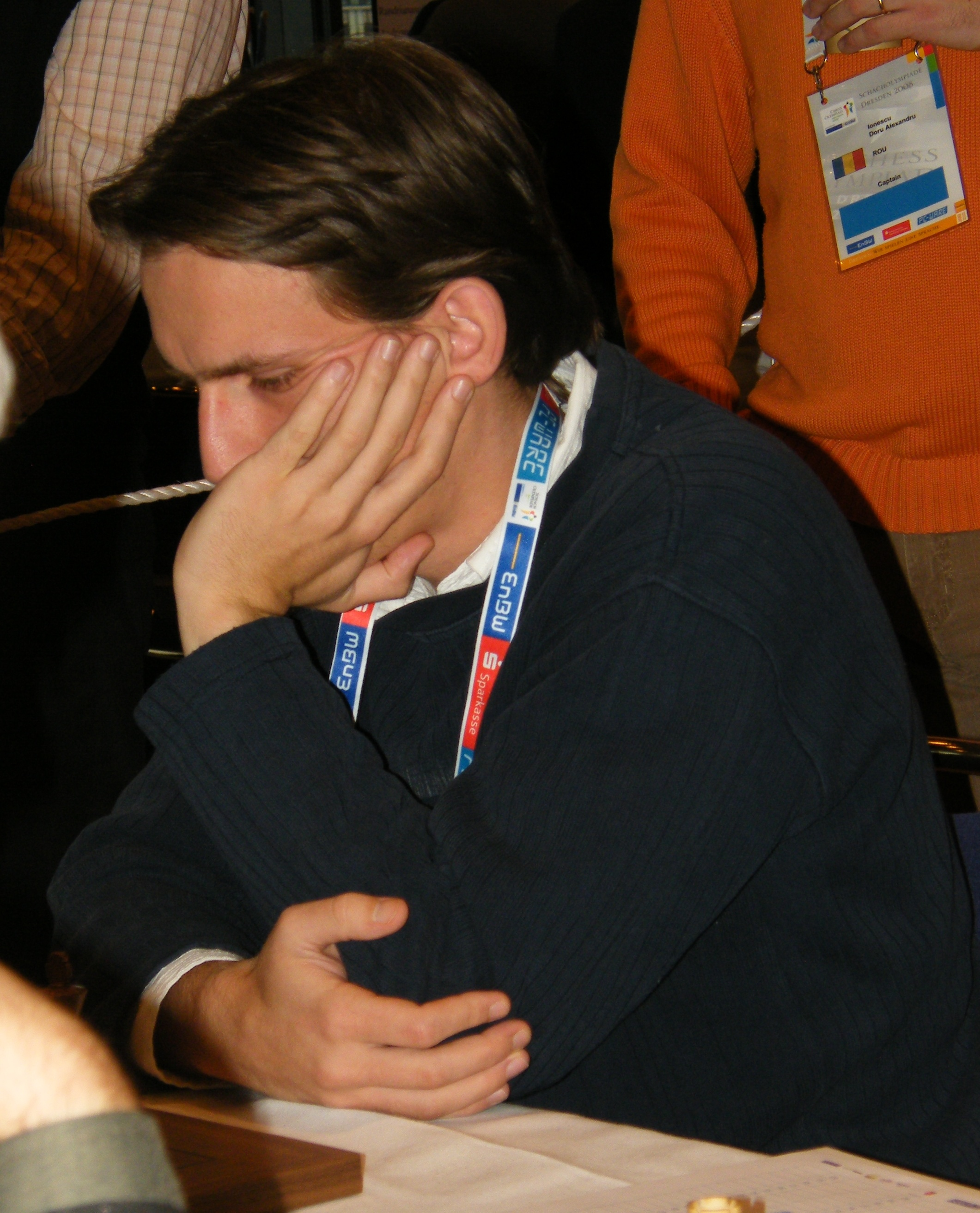
- Vajda in 2008

Personal information
- Born: 13 February 1981 (age 45)

Chess career
- Country: Romania
- Title: Grandmaster (2001)
- FIDE rating: 2534 (July 2026)
- Peak rating: 2632 (February 2013)

Levente Vajda (born 13 February 1981) is a Romanian chess grandmaster, earning his title in 2001.

== Biography ==
From an early age, Vajda was a permanent representative of Romania at the World Youth Chess Championships. In 1993, in Bratislava, he won bronze medal in the under-12 age group; a year later, he repeated this success in Szeged in the under-14 age group. In 1997, in Yerevan Levente Vajda won gold medal in under-16 age group, and he won another bronze medal in 1998 in Oropesa del Mar in the under-18 age group. In 1994, in Paris, he ranked second in the European Youth Rapid Chess Championship.

From the late 1990s, he was one of the leading Romanian chess players. He has won five individual Romanian Chess Championships medals: four silver (1998, 2002, 2004, 2012) and bronze (2003).

Vajda has achieved many successes at international chess tournaments, including winning or sharing first place eleven times in cyclical Grandmaster tournaments First Saturday in Budapest (in 2000–2007). In 1996, he achieved the same result in Balatonberény, and in 1998 he won in Bucharest. In 2002, Levente Vajda finished first in the Europe Nagymesterverseny tournament in Budapest. In 2004, he won tournaments in Balatonlelle and Göd, while the following year Levente Vajda triumphed in Victor Ciocâltea memorial in Bucharest. In 2006, he took first place in Fourmies and Eforie, while in 2007 he triumphed in Balatonlelle.

He played for Romania in the Chess Olympiads:

- In 1998, at second reserve board in the 33rd Chess Olympiad in Elista (+2, =0, -1),
- In 2002, at first reserve board in the 35th Chess Olympiad in Bled (+4, =4, -2),
- In 2006, at first reserve board in the 37th Chess Olympiad in Turin (+5, =2, -4),
- In 2008, at reserve board in the 38th Chess Olympiad in Dresden (+5, =1, -3),
- In 2012, at fourth board in the 40th Chess Olympiad in Istanbul (+6, =3, -1),
- In 2014, at reserve board in the 41st Chess Olympiad in Tromsø (+2, =4, -1),
- In 2018, at fourth board in the 43rd Chess Olympiad in Batumi (+5, =1, -2).

Vajda played for Romania in the European Team Chess Championship:

- In 2011, at third board in the 18th European Team Chess Championship in Porto Carras (+4, =2, -2).

In 1996, he was awarded the FIDE International Master (IM) title, and in 2001 he received the FIDE Grandmaster (GM) title. Levente is the brother of Woman Grandmaster (WGM) Szidonia Vajda (born 1979).

Vajda streams on Twitch as GM_Trankuilizer. He competes in mini-tournaments on Lichess as Trankuilizer.
