= Ildikó Mádl =

Hungarian chess player (born 1969)

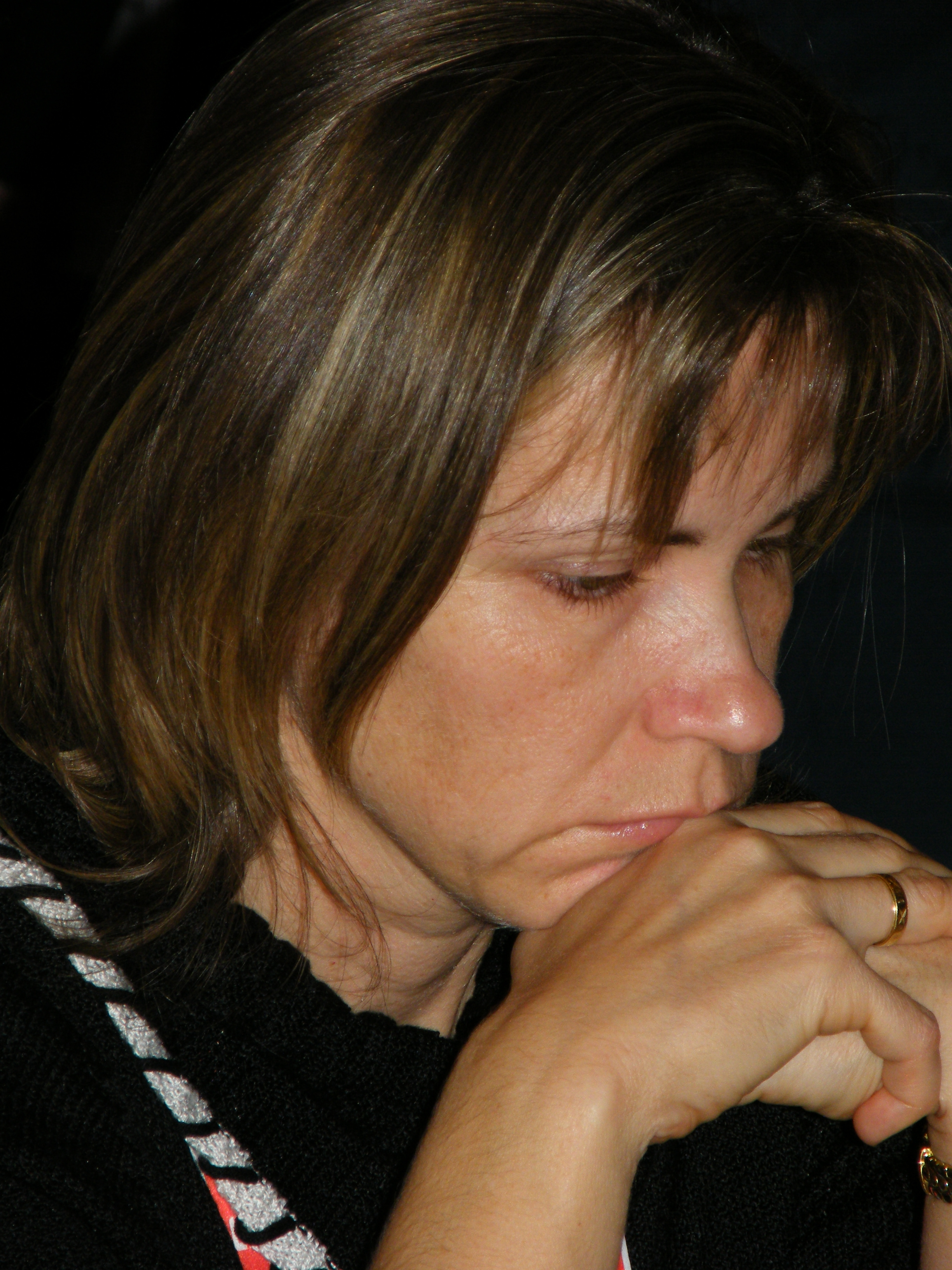
- Ildikó Mádl at the 38th Chess Olympiad, Dresden 2008

Personal information
- Born: Mádl Ildikó; 5 November 1969 (age 56) Tapolca, Hungary

Chess career
- Country: Hungary
- Title: International Master (1992); Woman Grandmaster (1986)
- Peak rating: 2426 (October 2001)

Ildikó Mádl (born 5 November 1969) is a Hungarian chess player who holds the FIDE titles of International Master (IM) and Woman Grandmaster (WGM).

Madl learned to play chess from her father. In 1978 she became a pupil of the chess school Mereszjev that helped to promote talented Hungarian children and teenagers.

== Individual tournaments ==
In 1982 and 1983 she won the so-called Olympiad of Pioneers and the Hungarian Championships under-13 and under-15. Moreover, in 1982 she won the Hungarian Girls Championship U20 although she was only 13 years of age. At the Hungarian Women's Championship in 1982 she was third. In 1983 and 1984 she achieved her first international successes. In winter 1983/84 she won an international girl's tournament in Straubing and in 1984 she won the Cadet World Championship for Girls (U16) in Champigny-sur-Marne and the European Junior Chess Championship for girls U20 in Katowice. It was only consequent that Mádl was nominated for the Hungarian national team. Consequently, in her first Women's Chess Olympiad she scored 8 points from 11 games, receiving the title of Woman International Master (WIM). She achieved the required norms for the title of Woman Grandmaster in 1985 at a men's tournament in Szolnok and an international women's tournament in Jajce.

In 1986 she would repeat her success at the European Junior Championship which took place that year in Băile Herculane. In the same year she became World Junior Girls Champion U20 in Vilnius, scoring 2 points ahead of Camilla Baginskaite and Svetlana Prudnikova. In May 1998 she was third at the Elo-tournament in Bechhofen, in January 1999 third at the ninth International Open in Augsburg-Göggingen. In January 2001 she won the International Brauhaus-Riegele-Tournament in Augsburg. In March of the same year she won without losing a single game the Tel Aviv Chess Festival, the first international women's tournament that ever took place in Israel. In January 2002 she won the 13th International Augsburg IM-Tournament. She won Hungarian Women's Championship in 1990, 1991, 1993 and 1999.

== National team ==
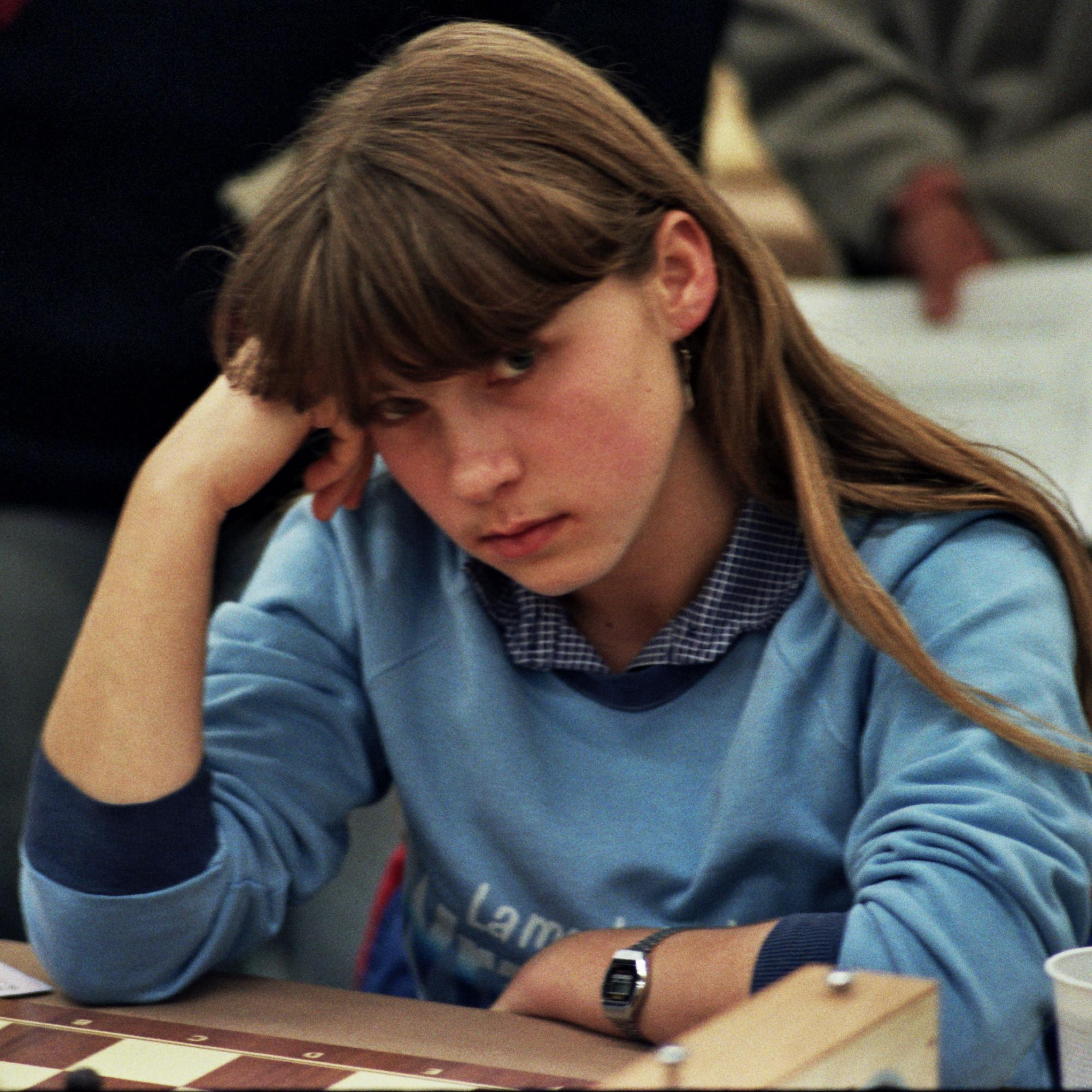
Mádl at the Thessaloniki Olympiad 1984

With the Hungarian national women's team she took part in eleven Women's Chess Olympiads between 1984 and 2006 with an overall result of 49 wins, 49 draws and 19 losses. The only Chess Olympiad in this time that she did not attend was the 2002 Olympiad in Bled. She won the Olympiad with her team twice: in 1988 and in 1990. The Hungarians winning the Olympiad 1988 in Thessaloniki was remarkable. For the first time since 1976 the event was not won by the Soviet Union. Mádl played together with the three Polgár sisters (Judit, Zsuzsanna and Zsófia). The gold medal was overshadowed by the tragic loss of her fiancé of that time, Béla Perényi. A few weeks before on the way from Budapest to the Olympiad he was killed in a car crash. During the Olympiad Mádl's coach was the FIDE Master Ottó Magyar.

She took part in European Women's Team Championship six times between 1992 and 2007. In 1992, 1999, 2001 and 2005 she played first board, in 2007 third board. Her biggest individual achievement was a bronze medal for her performance of 6½ out of 9 on first board in Batumi 1999. Her overall score at European Team Championships is 22.5 points out of 38 games (thirteen wins, nineteen draws, and six losses).

Being a member of the German team USV Halle, she plays for the federal state team of Saxony-Anhalt, with which she won the Championship of the Federal States (Ländermeisterschaft) in 2004.

== Club teams ==
In the Austrian Staatsliga A she played for the Men's team Salzburger SK Mozart Salzburg in 2000/2001 and 2001/2002. Since 2005 she plays for Feldbach/Kirchberg in the Austrian 2nd division and the Landsliga Steiermark. Since 2005 she plays as well in the Croatian First Women's League. In the German Frauenbundesliga (Women's 1st division) she plays for USV Halle and was team champion in 2007. In Hungary she plays for Csuti Antal SK. Zalaegerszeg and in Bosnia for ŠK Bihać.

== Titles ==
She received the titles of Woman International Master in 1984, Woman Grandmaster in 1986 and International Master in 1992.
