= József Horváth (chess player) =

Hungarian chess grandmaster (born 1964)

Personal information
- Born: 13 August 1964 (age 61) Budapest, Hungary

Chess career
- Country: Hungary
- Title: Grandmaster (1990)
- FIDE rating: 2400 (July 2026)
- Peak rating: 2567 (July 2009)

József Horváth (born 13 August 1964) is a Hungarian chess player who holds the FIDE title of Grandmaster (GM) (1990). He is a Hungarian Chess Championship medalist (1992), World Team Chess Championship individual bronze medalist (1989), FIDE International Arbiter (1998), and FIDE Senior Trainer (2011).

== Biography ==
József Horváth was one of the best Hungarian chess players in the 1990s. He has competed in the Hungarian Chess Championships finals many times and won bronze medal (1992). In the following years József Horváth achieved many individual chess tournament successes, winning or shared the first places, among others in Budapest (1988, 1989, 1993, 1994, 1997), Andorra la Vella (1989), Cannes (1992), Swiss Open Chess Championship (1992), Zalakaros (1995, 1996), Velden (1995), Paks (1996), Bischwiller (1999), Helsinki (2001), Chambéry (2001), Zalakaros (2002, 2004), Val Thorens (2002, 2006), Paris (2003), Verona (2005), Château de Lacroix-Laval (2005), Feffernitz (2008) and Aschachu (2008).

József Horváth played for Hungary in the Chess Olympiads:

- In 1990, at fourth board in the 29th Chess Olympiad in Novi Sad (+4, =7, -1),
- In 1992, at second reserve board in the 30th Chess Olympiad in Manila (+2, =3, -2),
- In 1998, at fourth board in the 33rd Chess Olympiad in Elista (+4, =3, -2).

József Horváth played for Hungary in the World Team Chess Championship:

- In 1989, at fourth board in the 2nd World Team Chess Championship in Lucerne (+1, =5, -0) and won individual bronze medal.

József Horváth played for Hungary in the European Team Chess Championship:

- In 1989, at third board in the 9th European Team Chess Championship in Haifa (+3, =5, -1),
- In 1992, at fourth board in the 10th European Team Chess Championship in Debrecen (+2, =3, -3).

In 1984, he was awarded the FIDE International Master (IM) title and received the FIDE Grandmaster (GM) title six years later. Also he is FIDE International Arbiter (1998) and FIDE Senior Trainer (2011).

His brother Csaba Horváth (born 1968) also is chess grandmaster.
