= Bence Korpa =

Hungarian chess grandmaster (born 1998)

Personal information
- Born: January 12, 1998 (age 28) Miskolc, Hungary

Chess career
- Country: Hungary
- Title: Grandmaster (2017)
- FIDE rating: 2509 (July 2026)
- Peak rating: 2560 (October 2019)

Bence Korpa is a Hungarian chess grandmaster.

== Chess career ==
He achieved the Grandmaster title in 2017, earning his norms at the:

- First Saturday GM tournament in December 2013 at Budapest
- Vojvodina I 2016 tournament in March 2016 at Novi Sad
- Bundesliga Sued tournament in May 2017 in Germany

In August 2019, he won the Hell Chess Festival a full point ahead of runner-up Sergey Volkov.

In December 2021, he was the only player to remain undefeated in the Hungarian Chess Championship, but ended up finishing in third place in the tournament.

In December 2022, he played in the Hungarian Chess Championship and was defeated by eventual champion Péter Prohászka in the final round, finishing in 7th place.
