= Zoltán von Balla =

Hungarian chess player (1883–1945)

Zoltán von Balla (31 August 1883, Budapest – 1 April 1945, Budapest) was a Hungarian chess champion.

In 1904, Balla took 11th place in Coburg (14 DSB Congress, B tournament). In 1905, he took 10th place in Vienna. In 1906, he won the first Hungarian Championship in Győr. He shared the title with Zsigmond Barász at Budapest in 1911. He won at Győr in 1911, took 18th place at Breslau in 1912 (18th DSB-Congress, Akiba Rubinstein and Oldřich Duras won), tied for 7th and 8th at Pistyan in 1912 (Rubinstein won), tied for 3rd and 4th at Temesvár in 1912, and tied for 4th and 5th at Budapest in 1913 (Rudolf Spielmann won).

In 1916, he took 2nd in Budapest. In 1918, he tied for 1st and 2nd in Budapest. In 1918, he tied for 6th and 7th in Kaschau (Richard Réti won). In 1921, he took 5th in Budapest. In 1922, he tied for 12th and 13th in Pistyan (Efim Bogoljubow won). In 1924, he won in Budapest. In 1925, he took 3rd in Budapest. In 1928, he took 9th in Budapest (José Raúl Capablanca won).

In 1935, Balla tied for 17th and 18th in Tatatovaros (László Szabó won). In 1939, he tied for 1st and 2nd with László Szabó in Budapest (Dori Memorial). In 1940, he tied for 4th and 5th in Budapest (Maróczy Jubilaeum, Max Euwe won).

He died in a traffic accident with a Soviet tank at the end of the Second World War.
