= Ilia Balinov =

Austrian chess grandmaster (born 1966)

Personal information
- Born: July 28, 1966 (age 59) Batak, Bulgaria

Chess career
- Country: Austria
- Title: Grandmaster (1999)
- Peak rating: 2570 (January 1997)

Ilia Balinov (born July 28, 1966 Batak, Bulgaria) is an Austrian chess player. He has played chess since he was 4 years old. He settled in Austria in 1991 and started representing Austria internationally from 1999. He received the Grandmaster (GM) title in 1999.

== Notable tournaments ==
Tournament Name	Year	ELO	Points
ch-Vienna State 2021(Vienna AUT)	2021	2507	5.5
ch-Vienna State 2019(Vienna AUT)	2019	2440	6.5
Graz op(Graz)	2006	2454	7.0
Vienna op-A 15th(Vienna)	2006	2454	8.0
Voesendorf op(Voesendorf)	2006	2455	3.0
AUT-ch qual(Gmunden)	2005	2388	7.5
Baden op-A 30th(Baden)	2002	2438	4.5
Vienna Donau op(Vienna)	1999	2430	7.0
Linz op 10th(Linz)	1999	2434	7.0
Schwarzach op-A(Schwarzach)	1999	2505	7.5
Oberwart op(Oberwart)	1997	2570	7.0
Carl Schlechter mem(Vienna)	1996	2385	7.0
Vienna op-B(Vienna)	1996	2385	6.5
Finkenstein op(Finkenstein)	1992	2270	6.5
Donau op(Aschach)	1992	2270	7.0
