= Mária Ivánka =

Hungarian chess player (born 1950)

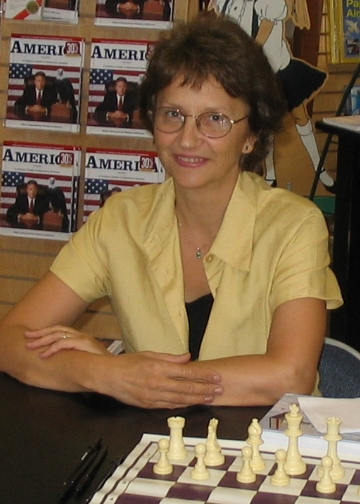
- Ivánka in 2004

Personal information
- Born: February 23, 1950 (age 76) Budapest, Hungary
- Spouse: András Budinszky (m. 1972)

Chess career
- Country: Hungary
- Title: Woman Grandmaster (1978)
- Years active: 1961–1993
- Peak rating: 2320 (January 1976)
- Peak ranking: No. 6 woman (January 1976)

Mária Ivánka (born 23 February 1950), also known as Mária Ivánka-Budinsky, is a Hungarian chess player who holds the FIDE title of Woman Grandmaster (WGM).

Ivánka was born in Budapest and played chess at ten years old for the first time and by the age of eleven won her very first chess tournament, the Championship for elementary school girls of Budapest. At the age of 17, in 1967 she won her first national title, the Hungarian Women Chess Championship. She would go on to win the national title a total of nine times. At the Chess Olympiads between 1969 and 1986 she collected six medals. She earned the title of Woman Grandmaster in 1978. In the seventies, during the Soviet-dominant chess era, she ranked as one of the world's top players. She defeated the reigning world champion, Nona Gaprindashvili twice in international tournaments. Beside her chess career, together with her husband and coach András Budinszky, she has raised three children. Her brother was actor and director of the Hungarian National Theatre, Csaba Ivánka.

== Significant results ==
- 4 Chess Olympiad silver medals (1969, 1978, 1980, 1986)
- 2 Chess Olympiad bronze medals (1972, 1982)
- 9 times Hungarian Champion
- 1 times European Co-champion
- 3 times Texas Champion
- 1 time Wijk aan Zee (1971)

== Awards ==
- State Gold Award for Sport
- Maróczy Award

== Publications ==
- Győzelmünk a sakkolimpián (Our win in the Olympiad, 1979)
- Versenyfutás az aranyérmekért (Race for the gold medals, 1980)
- Ezüstvezér (Silver Queen, 2000)
- Silver Queen, 2002
