= Ticia Gara =

Hungarian chess player (born 1984)

Tícia Gara
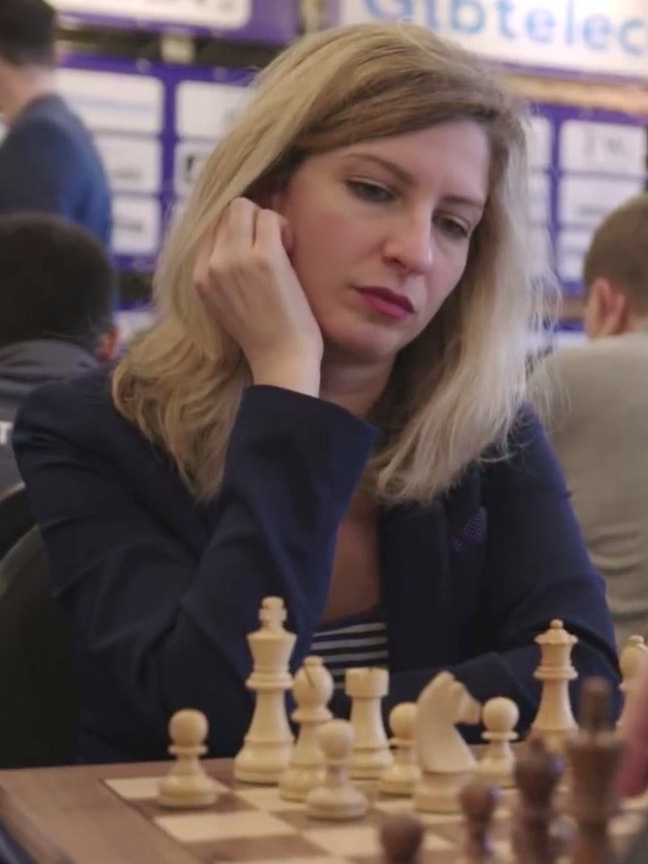
- Gara in 2007

Personal information
- Born: October 25, 1984 (age 41) Budapest, Hungary

Chess career
- Country: Hungary
- Title: Woman Grandmaster (2002)
- Peak rating: 2385 (July 2012)

Tícia Gara (born October 25, 1984) is a Hungarian chess player holding the title of Woman Grandmaster (WGM). She was the Hungarian women's champion in 2006, 2007 and 2019. In the 2009 edition she and her sister Anita were tied for first place, with Anita receiving the title on tie-break. Gara has played for the Hungarian team in the Women's Chess Olympiad, the Women's European Team Chess Championship, the European Youth Girls Team Championship and the Women's Mitropa Cup. Her team won the gold medal in the 2015 Women's Mitropa Cup in Mayrhofen, Austria. She contributed to the victory scoring six wins from six games playing board two.
