= József Pintér =

Hungarian chess grandmaster (born 1953)

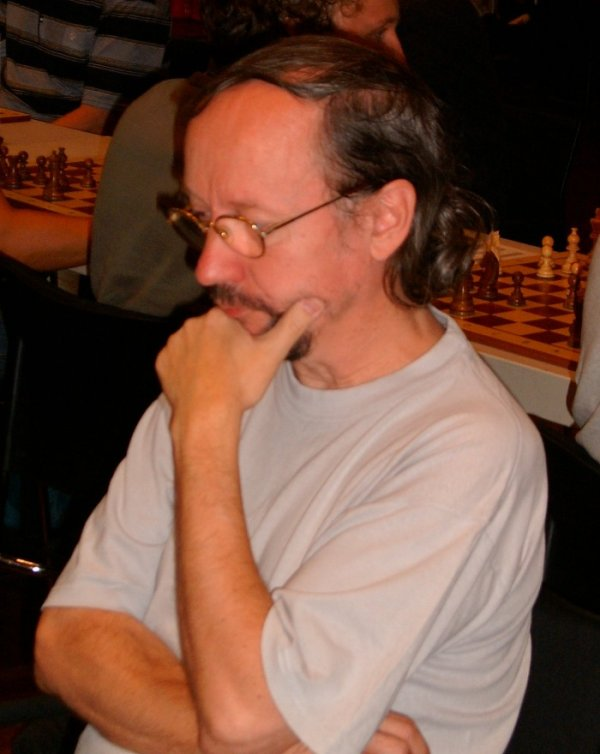

Personal information
- Born: 9 November 1953 (age 72) Budapest, Hungary

Chess career
- Country: Hungary
- Title: Grandmaster (1982)
- FIDE rating: 2528 (July 2026)
- Peak rating: 2595 (July 1998)
- Peak ranking: No. 22 (July 1985)

József Pintér (born 9 November 1953 in Budapest) is a Hungarian chess Grandmaster and chess writer. He won the Hungarian Chess Championship in 1978 and 1979. Pinter gained his grandmaster title in 1982. He is well known for a 1984 brilliancy against his compatriot Lajos Portisch in that year's Hungarian Championship.

== Books ==
- 1000 Minor Piece Endings (Caissa Hungary, 2007)
- 1000 Rook Endings (Magyar Sakkvilág, 2007)
- 1000 Pawn Endings (Magyar Sakkvilág, 2006)
- 300 fejtörő (300 Puzzles) (Magyar Sakkvilág, 2006)
- A sakktaktika titkai I, II, III, IV, (Secrets of chess tactics) - with István Pongó, (Magyar Sakkpartner Kiadó, 2002)
