= Leó Forgács =

Hungarian chess player (1881–1930)

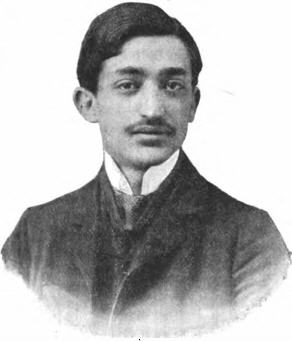
Leó Forgács

Leó Forgács ([ˈforɡaːt͡ʃ ˈlɛoː], né Fleischmann; 5 October 1881 – 17 August 1930) was a Hungarian chess player.

== Biography ==
Leó Fleischmann was a Hungarian Jew, born in Budapest in 1881.

Fleischmann began his international career at Hanover 1902 where he won Haupturnier B in the 13th DSB Congress. In 1904, he took 6th place at the “Rice Gambit” tournament, in the Monte Carlo chess tournament. In the same year, he took 10th in Coburg (14th DSB Congress). The event was won by Curt von Bardeleben, Carl Schlechter and Rudolf Swiderski. In 1905, he won in Barmen (B-tournament). In 1905, he took 5th in Vienna. The event was won by Schlechter. In 1906, he tied for 3rd–4th in Nuremberg (15th DSB Congress, Frank Marshall won). He took 5th in the Ostend 1907 chess tournament (Masters' Tournament). The event was won by Ossip Bernstein and Akiba Rubinstein. In 1907, he won the 2nd Hungarian championship in Székesfehérvár.

After 1908, Fleischmann played as Forgács. He took 14th in the Saint Petersburg 1909. The event was won by Emanuel Lasker and Rubinstein. In 1910, he tied for 9-10th in Hamburg (17th DSB Congress). The event was won by Schlechter. In 1911, he took 3rd in San Remo. The event was won by Hans Fahrni. In 1912, he took 13th in the San Sebastián chess tournament. The event was won by Rubinstein. In 1912, he took 3rd in Budapest. The event was won by Milan Vidmar. In 1913, he took 3rd in Budapest. The event was won by Rudolf Spielmann.

He died in 1930 in Berettyóújfalu in eastern Hungary.

== Notable chess games ==
- Leo Fleischmann vs Rudolf Swiderski, Monte Carlo 1904, King's Gambit Accepted, Rice Gambit, C39, 1-0
- Aron Nimzowitsch vs Leo Fleischmann, Barmen 1905, Masters B, Scotch Game, Schmidt Variation, C47, 0-1
- Leó Forgács vs Savielly Tartakower, Sankt Petersburg 1909, French, C13, 1-0
- Richard Réti vs Leó Forgács, Budapest 1913, Ruy Lopez, Morphy Defense, Tarrasch Variation, C77, 0-1
