= Zoltan Gyimesi =

Hungarian chess grandmaster (born 1977)

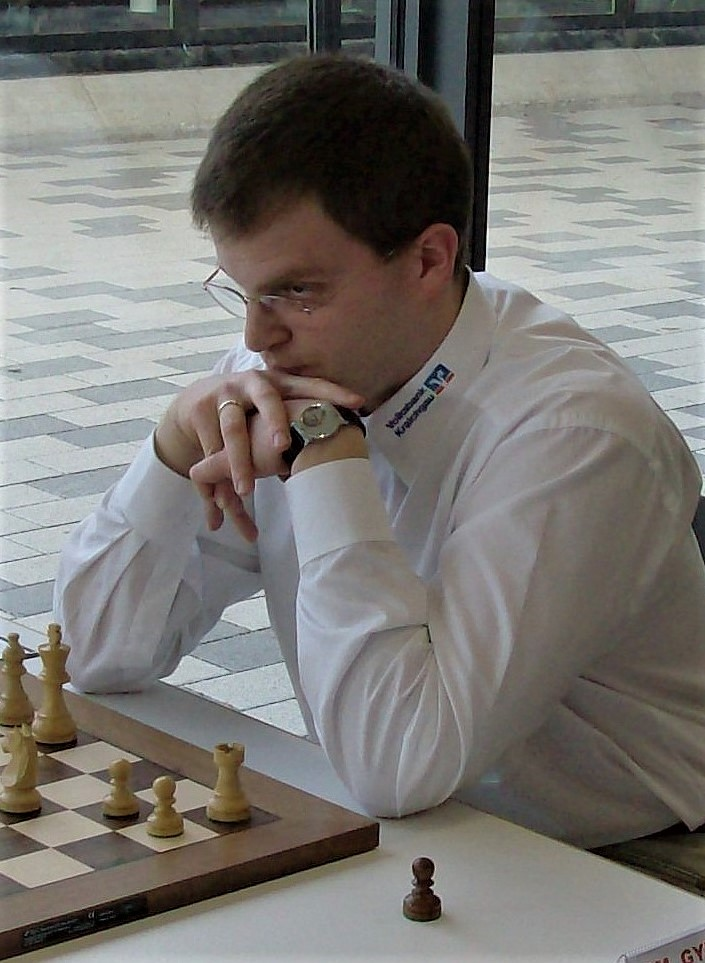

Personal information
- Born: 31 March 1977 (age 49) Kecskemét, Hungary
- Spouse: Nóra Medvegy

Chess career
- Country: Hungary
- Title: Grandmaster (1996)
- FIDE rating: 2674 (July 2026)
- Peak rating: 2674 (July 2012)
- Peak ranking: No. 71 (April 2013)

Zoltán Gyimesi (born 31 March 1977) is a Hungarian chess grandmaster and national champion in 2005. He has participated in four Chess Olympiads (1998, 2002, 2004, 2006) with a record of +11=18-4. In 2002, at the 35th Chess Olympiad, the Hungarian team won the silver medal with Gyimesi on the fourth board.

In 2004, he tied for 1st-6th with Evgeniy Najer, Artyom Timofeev, Kaido Külaots, Sergey Grigoriants and Oleg Korneev in the Cappelle-la-Grande Open. In 2005 he won the Hungarian Chess Championship, the EU Individual Open Chess Championship and the European Rapid Chess Championship.

Gyimesi is married to IM Nóra Medvegy.
