= Béla Perényi =

Hungarian chess player (1953–1988)

Béla Perényi (October 20, 1953 – November 13, 1988) was a Hungarian chess International Master known for his work in opening theory. Two major lines in the Najdorf Sicilian are named after him. He died in a car crash in 1988 while on the way to visit his fiancée, Ildikó Mádl.

== Perenyi Attack ==
Position: a8 black rook, b8 black knight, c8 black bishop, d8 black queen, e8 black king, f8 black bishop, h8 black rook, b7 black pawn, f7 black pawn, h7 black pawn, a6 black pawn, f6 black knight, e5 black pawn, f5 white pawn, g5 white pawn, d4 black pawn, c3 white knight, e3 white bishop, f3 white queen, a2 white pawn, b2 white pawn, c2 white pawn, f2 white pawn, h2 white pawn, a1 white rook, e1 white king, f1 white bishop, h1 white rook

The Perenyi Attack (1.e4 c5 2.Nf3 d6 3.d4 cxd4 4.Nxd4 Nf6 5.Nc3 a6 6.Be3 e6 7.g4), position after 7...e5 8.Nf5 g6 9.g5 gxf5 10.exf5 d5 11.Qf3 d4. This attack has been played several times between grandmasters, but chess author Lars Bo Hansen does not recommend this to amateurs.

The Perenyi Attack (1.e4 c5 2.Nf3 d6 3.d4 cxd4 4.Nxd4 Nf6 5.Nc3 a6 6.Be3 e6 7.g4), position after 7...e5 8.Nf5 g6 9.g5 gxf5 10.exf5 d5 11.Qf3 d4. This attack has been played several times between grandmasters, but chess author Lars Bo Hansen does not recommend this to amateurs.

The Perenyi Attack (1.e4 c5 2.Nf3 d6 3.d4 cxd4 4.Nxd4 Nf6 5.Nc3 a6 6.Be3 e6 7.g4!?) is a line in the Najdorf Sicilian named after Perenyi, who invented it. It is a sharp line that involves White sacrificing a knight in the main line. It has since been used multiple times by other strong Hungarian masters, including Judit Polgar and Peter Leko.
