= Róbert Ruck =

Hungarian chess grandmaster (born 1977)

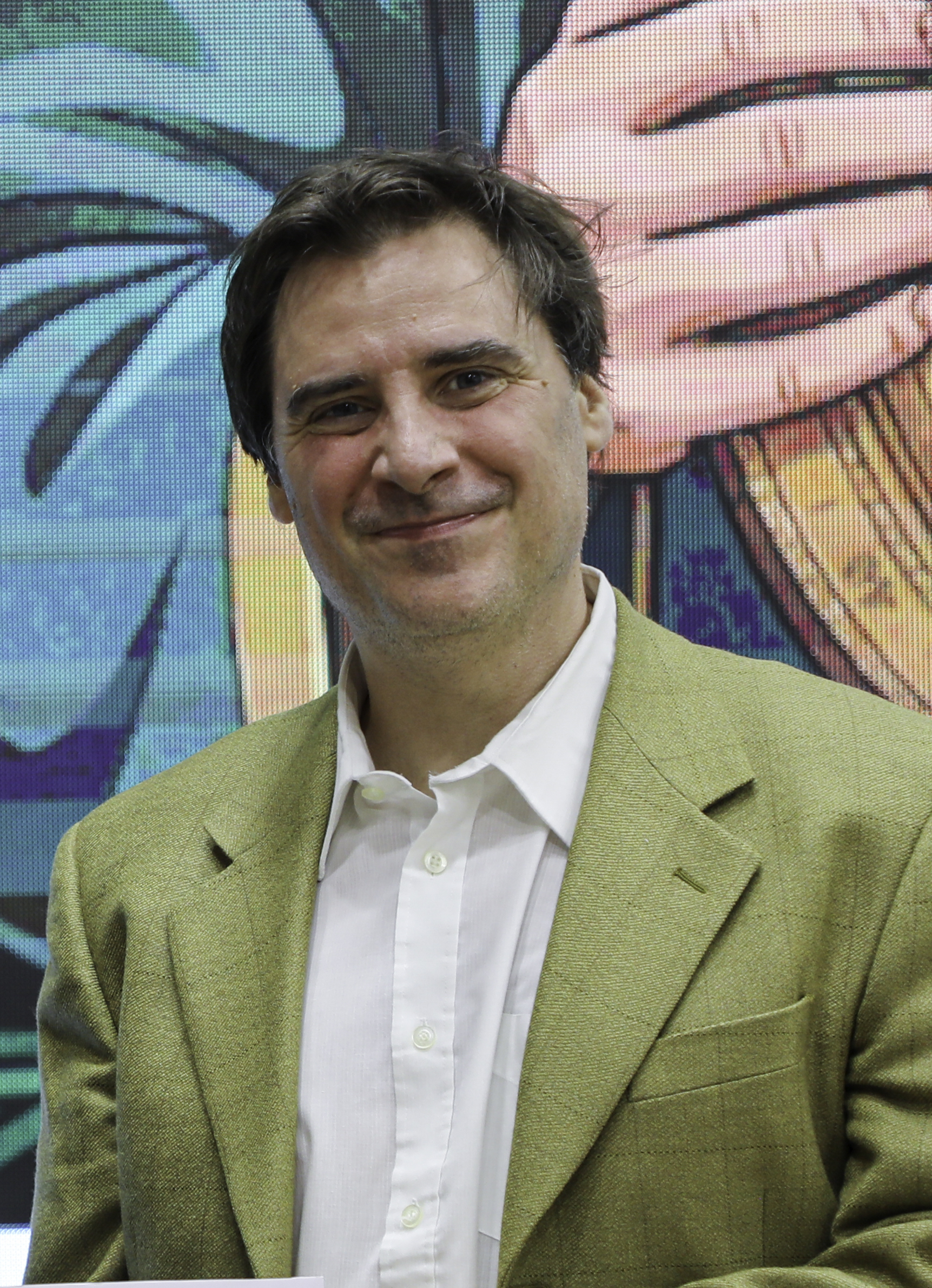
- Ruck in 2026

Personal information
- Born: 10 December 1977 (age 48)

Chess career
- Country: Hungary
- Title: Grandmaster (2000)
- FIDE rating: 2472 (July 2026)
- Peak rating: 2586 (January 2015)

Róbert Ruck (born 10 December 1977) is a Hungarian chess grandmaster. He won the Hungarian Chess Championship in 2002, a silver medal at the 35th Chess Olympiad in 2002, and won a World Team Chess Championship individual bronze medal in 2001.

== Biography ==
Róbert Ruck has repeatedly represented Hungary at the European Youth Chess Championship and World Youth Chess Championships in various age groups. Róbert Ruck achieved his best result in 1992, in Rimavská Sobota, when he shared 2nd - 3rd place in European Youth Chess Championship in U16 age group, and in 1994, in Szeged when he shared 2nd - 3rd place in European Youth Chess Championship in U18 age group, and in 1994, in Chania when he shared 2nd - 4th place in World Youth Chess Championship in U18 age group.

In 2002, Róbert Ruck won the Hungarian Chess Championship but a year later he won a silver medal in this tournament.

Róbert Ruck is winner of many international chess tournaments, including Zagreb (1997), Budapest (2000), Keszeg (2000), Kladovo (2001), Lippstadt (2003).

Róbert Ruck played for Hungary in the Chess Olympiads:

- In 2000, at second reserve board in the 34th Chess Olympiad in Istanbul (+1, =2, -1),
- In 2002, at first reserve board in the 35th Chess Olympiad in Bled (+1, =3, -0) and won team silver medal,
- In 2004, at fourth board in the 36th Chess Olympiad in Calvià (+3, =4, -2),
- In 2006, at first reserve board in the 37th Chess Olympiad in Turin (+0, =3, -1).

Róbert Ruck played for Hungary in the World Team Chess Championship:

- In 2001, at third board in the 5th World Team Chess Championship in Yerevan (+3, =2, -2) and won individual bronze medal.

Róbert Ruck played for Hungary in the European Team Chess Championships:

- In 2003, at fourth board in the 14th European Team Chess Championship in Plovdiv (+0, =4, -2),
- In 2005, at fourth board in the 15th European Team Chess Championship in Gothenburg (+3, =4, -1),
- In 2007, at reserve board in the 16th European Team Chess Championship in Heraklion (+2, =4, -0),
- In 2009, at reserve board in the 17th European Team Chess Championship in Novi Sad (+1, =6, -0).

In 1994, he was awarded the FIDE International Master title, and in 2000 the FIDE Grandmaster title.
