= Artyom Timofeev (chess player) =

Russian chess grandmaster (born 1985)

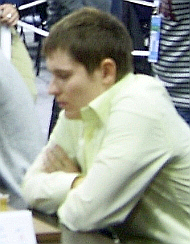

Personal information
- Born: January 6, 1985 (age 41) Kazan, Tatar ASSR, Russian SFSR, Soviet Union

Chess career
- Country: Russia
- Title: Grandmaster (2003)
- FIDE rating: 2511 (July 2026)
- Peak rating: 2690 (July 2010)
- Peak ranking: No. 38 (January 2007)

Artyom Valerievich Timofeev (Russian: Артём Тимофеев; born January 6, 1985) is a Russian chess player. He was awarded the title of Grandmaster by FIDE in 2003. Timofeev was born in Kazan. He, Zahar Efimenko and Andrei Volokitin tied for first place in the Under 14 section of the World Youth Chess Championships in 1999; Timofeev finished second on tiebreak. The next year, he won the Under 18 division of the European Youth Chess Championships.

== Biography ==
Timofeev tied for first with Evgeniy Najer, Kaido Külaots, Zoltan Gyimesi, Sergey Grigoriants and Oleg Korneev at the Cappelle-la-Grande Open of 2004, finishing third on tiebreak. In 2005 he won the Russian Junior Championship and tied for 2nd-5th with Kamil Mitoń, Zhang Pengxiang and Lázaro Bruzón at the Samba Cup in Skanderborg, Denmark. In the latter event he also won the brilliancy prize for his game against Liviu-Dieter Nisipeanu. Timofeev participated in the FIDE World Cup 2005, where he reached the second round and lost to Emil Sutovsky.

He won the Russian Cup in 2007 by beating Vadim Zvjaginsev 1½-½ in the final. The next year, he won the Moscow Open and the Russian Championship Higher League. Thanks to the latter victory, Timofeev qualified for the Superfinal of the Russian Chess Championship, held in October 2008, where he scored 6/11, finishing seventh out of twelve participants. In 2009 Timofeev participated in the Elite group of the 44th Capablanca Memorial, a category 17 double round-robin tournament, where he scored 4 points out of 10. In the FIDE World Cup 2009 he was eliminated in the second round by Sergey Karjakin.

In 2010, Timofeev won the bronze medal at the 11th European Individual Chess Championship held in Rijeka. This result enabled him to qualify for the World Cup 2011. Here he was knocked out in the first round by Sergei Azarov. In 2014, he won the Tikhookeansky Meridian rapid tournament in Vladivostok, edging out Vladimir Belous and Dmitry Bocharov on tiebreak.

Timofeev played for the Russian national team at the 2005 European Team Chess Championship and at the China vs Russia matches of 2007, 2009 and 2010. Also in 2010, at the 39th Chess Olympiad he was part of team Russia 2.
