= Zoltán Varga (chess player) =

Hungarian chess grandmaster (born 1970)

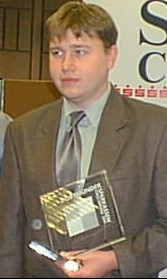
- Varga in 2001

Personal information
- Born: July 12, 1970 (age 55)

Chess career
- Country: Hungary
- Title: Grandmaster (1995)
- Peak rating: 2592 (July 2004)

Zoltán Varga (born July 12, 1970) is a Hungarian chess grandmaster. On the July 2009 FIDE list his Elo rating is 2473.
