= Zalakaros =

- Flag Coat of arms

- Location of Zalakaros
- Coordinates: 46.56057°N 17.12299°E
- Country: Hungary
- County: Zala

Area
  - Total: 17.17 km^{2} (6.63 sq mi)

Population (2011)
  - Total: 1,791
  - Density: 105.3/km^{2} (273/sq mi)
- Time zone: UTC+1 (CET)
  - Summer (DST): UTC+2 (CEST)
- Postal code: 8749
- Area code: 93

Zalakaros is a town in Zala County, Hungary.

Zalakaros is famous for its thermal spring baths. It gained its fame in 1962, when prospective oil drilling struck a nearly 96 °C (205 °F) source at a depth of 1000 metres.

== Twin towns – sister cities ==
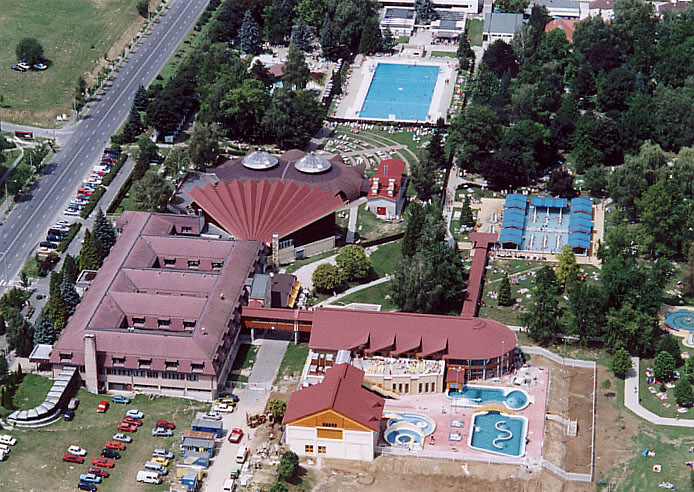
Aerial view of the baths

Zalakaros is twinned with:

- Asperhofen, Austria
- Puchheim, Germany
- Olesno, Poland

== Gallery ==
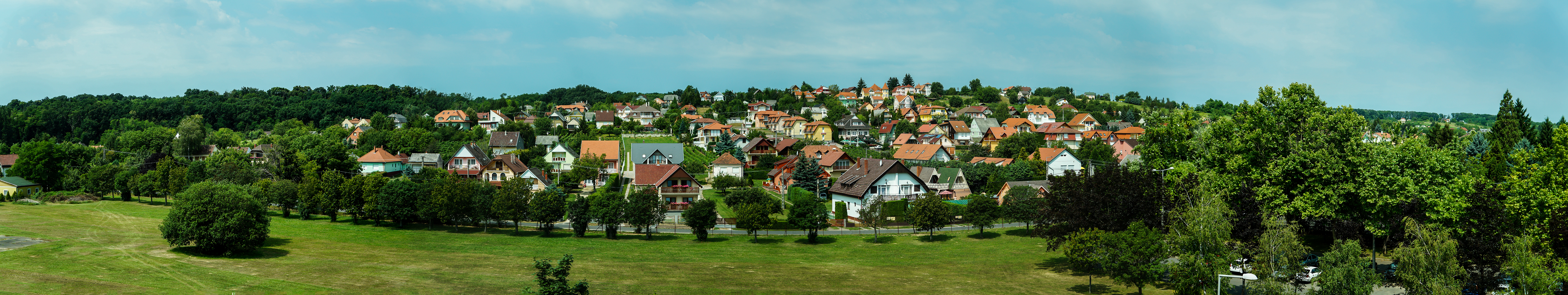
Zalakaros panorama
