= Women's World Team Chess Championship 2009 =

International chess competition

The Women's World Team Chess Championship 2009 was the second edition of the women's chess event of the World Team Chess Championship. It was played in the Chinese city Ningbo.

The Chinese team won their second title.

== Teams ==
- China "One"
1. Hou Yifan
2. Zhao Xue
3. Shen Yang
4. Ju Wenjun
5. Huang Qian
- Georgia
1. Maia Chiburdanidze
2. Nana Dzagnidze
3. Lela Javakhishvili
4. Maia Lomineishvili
5. Sopiko Khukhashvili
- Russia
1. Tatiana Kosintseva
2. Nadezhda Kosintseva
3. Ekaterina Kovalevskaya
4. Marina Romanko
5. Valentina Gunina
- Ukraina
1. Anna Ushenina
2. Natalia Zhukova
3. Inna Yanovska
4. Mariya Muzychuk
5. Natalia Zdebskaya
- India
1. Harika Dronavalli
2. Tania Sachdev
3. Kruttika Nadig
4. Eesha Karavade
5. Mary Ann Gomes
- Poland
1. Iweta Rajlich
2. Jolanta Zawadzka
3. Joanna Majdan
4. Joanna Dworakowska
5. Karina Szczepkowska-Horowska
- USA
1. Irina Krush
2. Anna Zatonskih
3. Rusudan Goletiani
4. Alisa Melekhina
5. Tatev Abrahamian
- Armenia
1. Elina Danielian
2. Lilit Mkrtchian
3. Lilit Galojan
4. Nelly Aginian
5. Siranush Andriasian
- China "Two"
1. Tan Zhongyi
2. Zhang Xiaowen
3. Wang Yu
4. Ding Yixin
5. Wang Xiaohui
- Vietnam
1. Hoàng Thị Bảo Trâm
2. Phạm Lê Thảo Nguyên
3. Hoàng Thị Như Ý
4. Phạm Bích Ngọc
5. Võ Thị Kim Phụng

== Results ==
1. China One
2. Russia
3. Ukraine
4. Georgia
5. Armenia
6. Poland
7. India
8. USA
9. China Two
10. Vietnam
