= Thorsten Michael Haub =

German chess grandmaster (born 1968)

- Thorsten Michael Haub in 2008

Personal information
- Born: February 15, 1968 (age 58) Siegen, North Rhine-Westphalia, West Germany

Chess career
- Country: Germany
- Title: Grandmaster (2015)
- Peak rating: 2518 (July 2010)

Thorsten Michael Haub (born 15 February 1968) is a German chess Grandmaster.

== Career ==
Haub was awarded the International Master (IM) title in 1997.

He achieved his first Grandmaster (GM) norm at the Scandinavian Open in Copenhagen in April 2009. He fulfilled his remaining norms at the Copenhagen Chess Challenge in Ballerup in May 2015 and at the 6th Vandœuvre Open in Vandœuvre-lès-Nancy in December 2015, receiving the GM title that same year.

At the national level, Haub won the German Rapid Chess Championship in Ingolstadt in 2006, having previously finished as runner-up in 2000 and 2002. In July 2006, he won the German Blitz Team Championship with Schachvereinigung Plettenberg alongside Kamil Mitoń, Yuri Drozdovskij, and Carsten Lingnau, after having finished second in the event in 1995.

In club chess, Haub has played for SV Plettenberg and SG Bochum 31 in Germany. In the Belgian Interclubs, he played for Schachfreunde Wirtzfeld, winning national titles in 2009, 2018, and 2020, as well as for Cercle d’Échecs Fontainois from 2011 to 2017. In Luxembourg, he represented Schachklub Nordstad (until 2005), Esch Rochade Reine (2005–2017), and De Sprénger Echternach (since 2019).

=== Tournament results ===
- 2001: 1st place at the International Stuttgart City Championship ahead of Matthias Duppel.
- 2004: 1st place at the Bad Ems Open.
- 2006: 1st place at the German Rapid Chess Championship in Ingolstadt.
- 2008: 1st place at the 4th Vandœuvre Open.
