= Mühren =

Mühren is a surname. Notable people with the surname include:

- Arnold Mühren (born 1951), Dutch football manager and former footballer
- Bianca de Jong-Muhren (born 1986), Dutch chess grandmaster
- Gerrie Mühren (1946–2013), Dutch footballer
- Robert Mühren (born 1989), Dutch footballer
