= Nadezhda Azarova =

Belarusian chess player (born 1983)

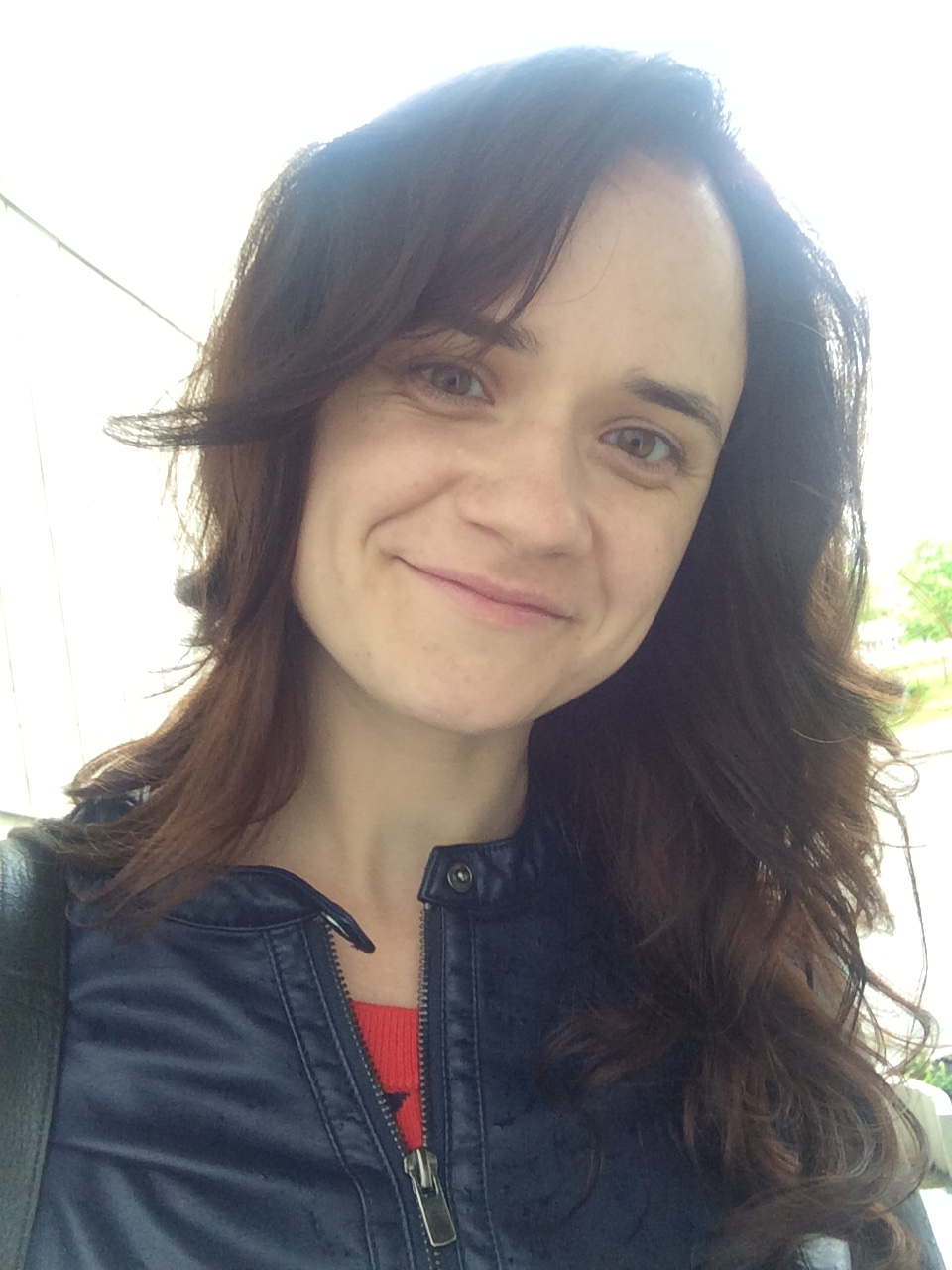
- Azarova in 2016

Personal information
- Full name: Nadezhda Petrovna Azarova
- Born: 18 September 1983 (age 42) Minsk, Byelorussian SSR, Soviet Union

Chess career
- Country: Belarus
- Title: Woman International Master (2006)
- FIDE rating: 2296 (July 2009)
- Peak rating: 2323 (April 2009)

Nadezhda Petrovna Azarova (Russian: Надежда Петровна Азарова; born 18 September 1983), née Polivoda, is a Belarusian chess player who holds the FIDE title of Woman International Master (WIM, 2006).

== Biography ==
In 2000s, Nadezhda Azarova was one of the leading Belarusian chess players. She won six medals in Belarusian Women's Chess Championships.

Azarova played for Belarus in the Women's Chess Olympiads:

- In 2006, at first board in the 37th Chess Olympiad (women) in Turin (+1, =2, -6),
- In 2008, at third board in the 38th Chess Olympiad (women) in Dresden (+5, =4, -0).

In 2006, she received the FIDE Woman International Master (WIM) title.
