= Raül García Paolicchi =

Andorran chess player

Raül García
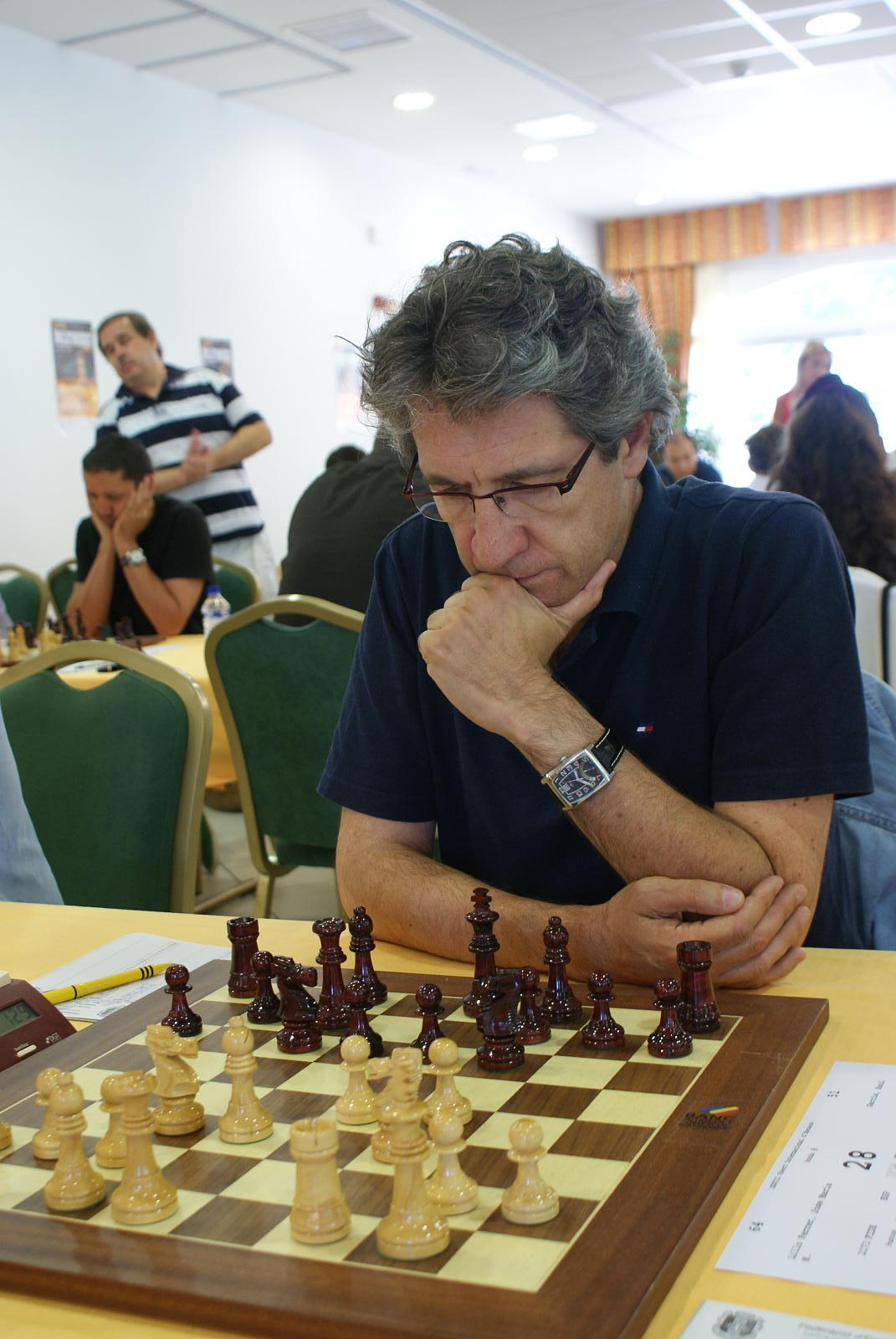
- García in 2009

Personal information
- Born: 30 December 1952 (age 73)

Chess career
- Country: Andorra
- Title: FIDE Master (1993)
- Peak rating: 2420 (July 1998)

Raül García Paolicchi (born 30 December 1952) is an Andorran chess player who received the FIDE title of FIDE Master (FM) in 1993. He is a two-time Andorran Chess Championship winner (2011, 2013) and Chess Olympiad individual gold medalist (1990).

== Biography ==
Raül García Paolicchi became Andorran Chess Championship silver medalist four times (2001, 2002, 2005, 2010) and won this tournament twice (2011, 2013). He participated in FIDE Zonal Chess Tournaments four times: 1987, 1993, 1995, and 1998. In 1994, in Spain, he won the international chess tournament Mollerussa Open, and a year later he came second in this tournament.

Raül García Paolicchi played for Andorra in the Chess Olympiads:

- In 1984, at the first board in the 26th Chess Olympiad in Thessaloniki (+5, =6, -2),
- In 1986, at the first board in the 27th Chess Olympiad in Dubai (+8, =3, -3),
- In 1988, at the first board in the 28th Chess Olympiad in Thessaloniki (+6, =4, -4),
- In 1990, at the first board in the 29th Chess Olympiad in Novi Sad (+9, =3, -2), winning an individual gold medal,
- In 1992, at the first board in the 30th Chess Olympiad in Manila (+5, =3, -4),
- In 1994, at the first board in the 31st Chess Olympiad in Moscow (+7, =0, -6),
- In 1996, at the first board in the 32nd Chess Olympiad in Yerevan (+1, =6, -5),
- In 1998, at the first board in the 33rd Chess Olympiad in Elista (+1, =5, -5),
- In 2000, at the second board in the 34th Chess Olympiad in Istanbul (+1, =5, -4),
- In 2002, at the third board in the 35th Chess Olympiad in Bled (+2, =2, -6),
- In 2004, at the first reserve board in the 36th Chess Olympiad in Calvià (+2, =2, -3),
- In 2006, at the fourth board in the 37th Chess Olympiad in Turin (+2, =2, -5),
- In 2008, at the second board in the 38th Chess Olympiad in Dresden (+1, =5, -5),
- In 2010, at the third board in the 39th Chess Olympiad in Khanty-Mansiysk (+2, =3, -3),
- In 2012, at the third board in the 40th Chess Olympiad in Istanbul (+3, =4, -3),
- In 2014, at the third board in the 41st Chess Olympiad in Tromsø (+2, =1, -5),
- In 2016, at the fourth board in the 42nd Chess Olympiad in Baku (+3, =2, -5),
- In 2018, at the third board in the 43rd Chess Olympiad in Batumi (+3, =4, -1).
