= Feva =

Feva, FeVA, or FEVA can refer to:

- RS Feva, a brand of sailing dinghy
- Argentine Volleyball Federation (abbreviated FeVA), which governs volleyball in Argentina
- Sandra Feva (1947 – 2020), an American singer
- FEVA TV, a Canadian TV channel
- Feletheus (fl. 475 – died 487), the king of the Rugii tribe, located in modern-day Austria
- Federació d'Escacs Valls d'Andorra, which organizes the Andorran Chess Championship
