= Natacha Benmesbah =

French chess player

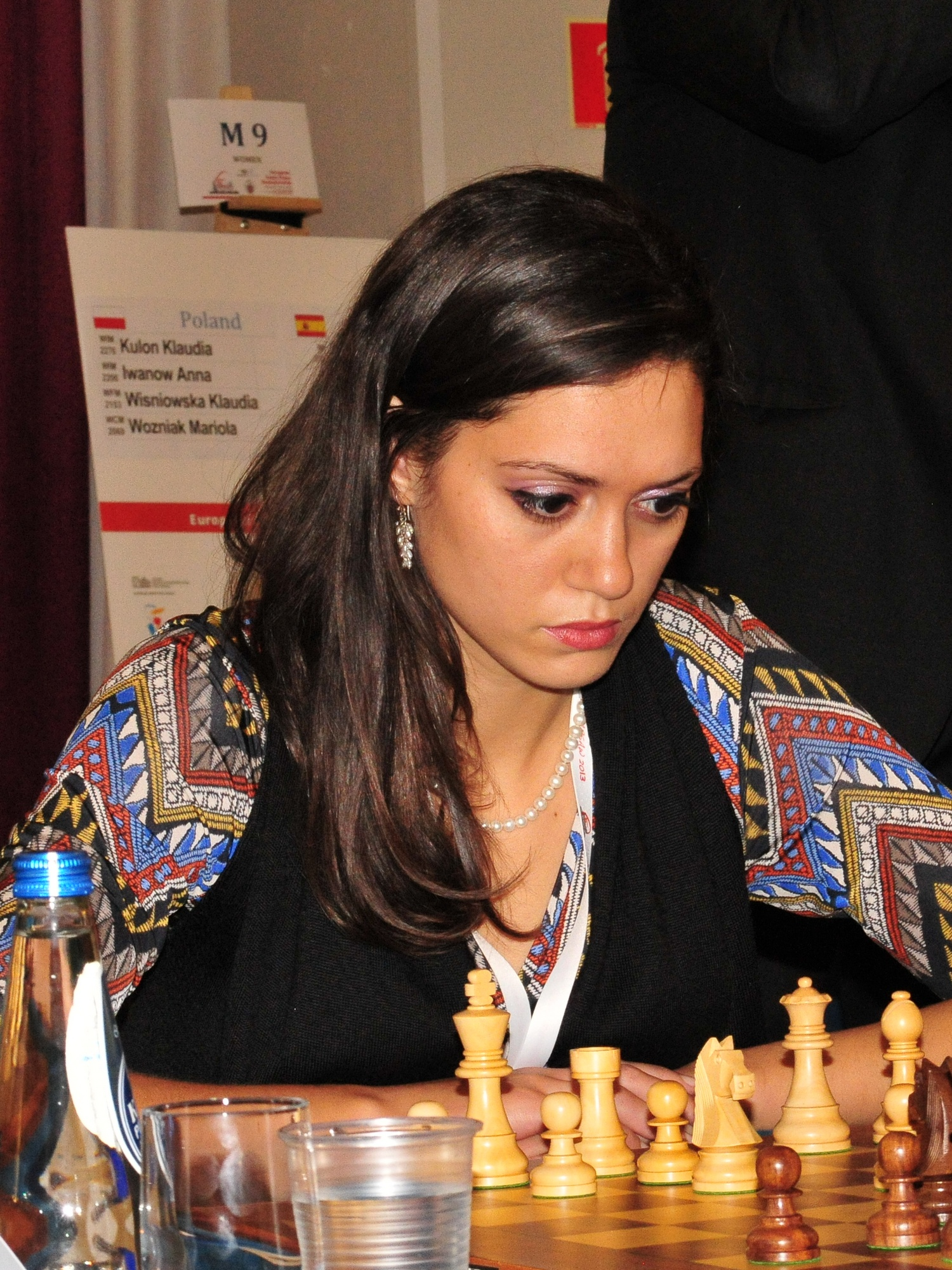
- Natacha Benmesbah in 2013

Personal information
- Born: 21 October 1989 (age 36)

Chess career
- Country: France
- Title: Woman International Master (2011)
- Peak rating: 2308 (July 2022)

Natacha Benmesbah (born 21 October 1989) is a French chess Woman Grandmaster (2024), World Women's Team Chess Championship bronze medalist (2023).

== Chess career ==
Natacha Benmesbah won the silver medal at the European Youth Chess Championship in girl's U16 age group in 2005 and the French University Championship in 2016. She was awarded the titles of Woman International Master in 2011 and Woman Grandmaster in 2024.

Natacha Benmesbah finished second in the French Women's Chess Championship in 2016, tied on points with French champion Sophie Milliet and in 2022, beaten in the final by Almira Skripchenko. She is again vice-champion of France in 2022.

Natacha Benmesbah played for France in the European Women's Team Chess Championships:

- In 2013, at reserve board in the 10th European Team Chess Championship (women) in Warsaw (+1, =3, -2),
- In 2019, at reserve board in the 13th European Team Chess Championship (women) in Batumi (+3, =0, -3).
- In 2021, at fourth board in the 14th European Team Chess Championship (women) in Čatež ob Savi (+1, =1, -3).

Natacha Benmesbah played for France in the World Women's Team Chess Championships:

- In 2013, at reserve board in the 4th Women's World Team Chess Championship in Astana (+2, =2, -4),
- In 2023, at first reserve board in the 9th Women's World Team Chess Championship in Bydgoszcz (+1, =0, -2) and won team bronze medal.

Natacha Benmesbah works as a doctor.
