= Artur Frolov =

Ukrainian chess player (born 1970)

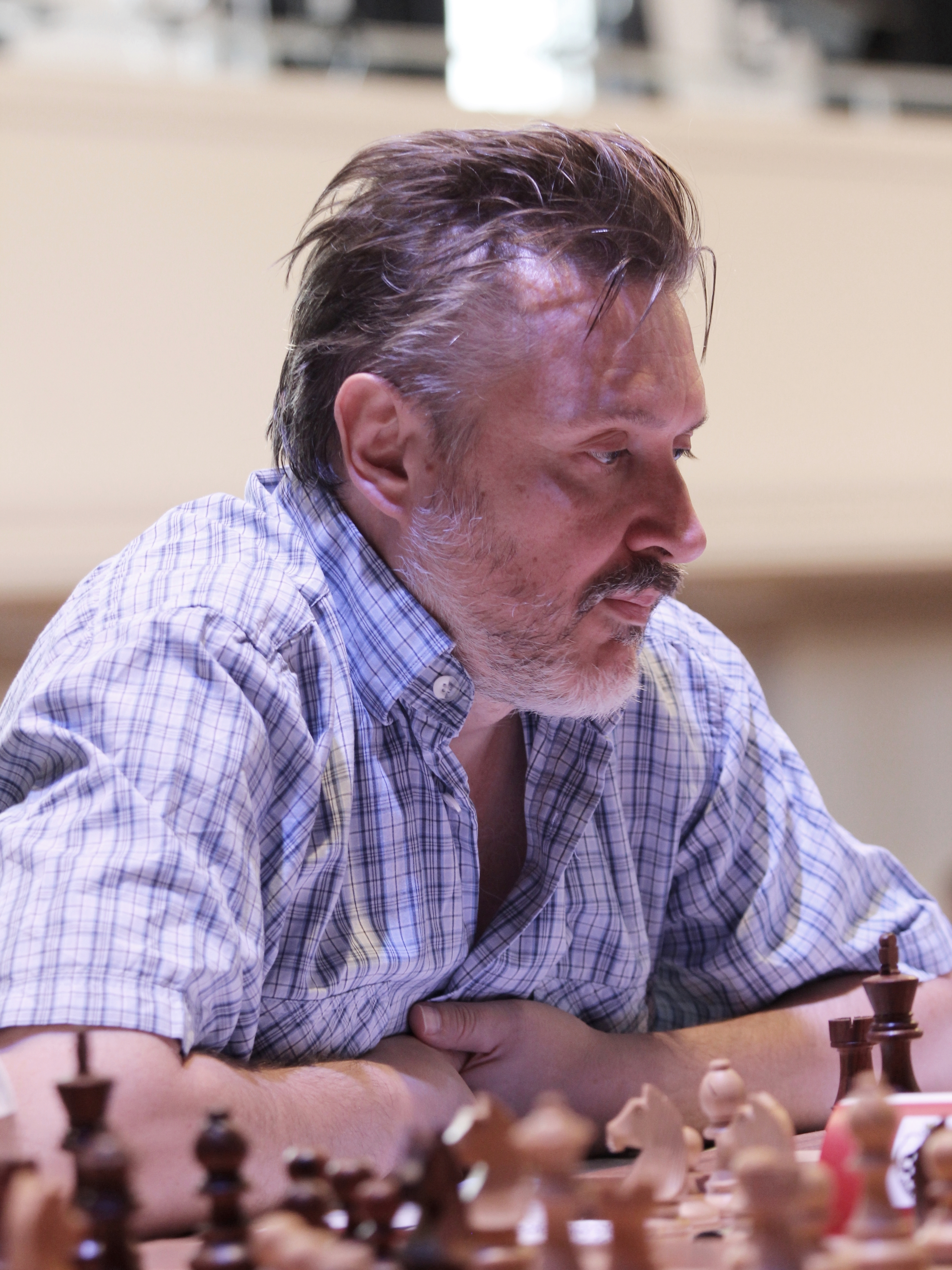
- Artur Frolov in 2018

Personal information
- Born: 30 July 1970 (age 55) Alchevsk, Ukraine

Chess career
- Country: Soviet Union; Ukraine
- Title: International Master (1991)
- Peak rating: 2545 (January 1995)

Artur Frolov (Ukrainian: Артур Фролов; born 30 July 1970) is a Ukrainian chess International Master (1991). He is a World Team Chess Championship silver medalist (1993).

== Biography ==
In 1986, Frolov participated in the individual semi-finals of the USSR Chess Championship. In 1990, he shared 3rd place (behind Boris Alterman, together with Vladimir Kramnik) in the final of the USSR Junior Chess Championship in the U20 age group. In 1991 he participated in the last final of the individual USSR Chess Championship, scoring 6½ points in 11 games.

Frolov started competing in international chess tournaments at the end of the 1990s, achieving a number of successes, including 1st place in Trnava (1989, tournament C), 1st place in Siófok (1990, together with István Csom), 2nd place in Alushta (1992, after Igor Novikov), shared 1st place in Mykolaiv (1993, zonal tournament, together with Aleksej Aleksandrov; in playoff Artur Frolov won 1½:½ and advanced to the tournament played in the same year in Biel Interzonal chess tournament, in which he was unsuccessful, taking a distant place,) 1st place in Groningen (1993), shared 1st place in Hlohovec (1993) and 2nd place in Pula (1994, after Vladimir Tukmakov, together with Gyula Sax, Stanislav Savchenko, Mišo Cebalo and Krunoslav Hulak).

Frolov played for Ukraine in the Chess Olympiad:

- In 1994, at second reserve board in the 31st Chess Olympiad in Moscow (+2, =5, -0).

He played for Ukraine in the World Team Chess Championship:

- In 1993, at second reserve board in the 3rd World Team Chess Championship in Lucerne (+0, =2, -1) and won team silver medal.

He played three times for chess club Donbass Alchevsk in the European Men's Chess Club Cups (1993–1995).

In 1991, he was awarded the FIDE International Master (IM) title. He reached his career highest chess ranking on January 1, 1995, with a rating of 2545, and was then 15th–17th place among Ukrainian chess players.

Frolov put his chess career on hold in 1998. He started playing again fairly recently.
