= Elena Maksimova =

Belarusian chess player

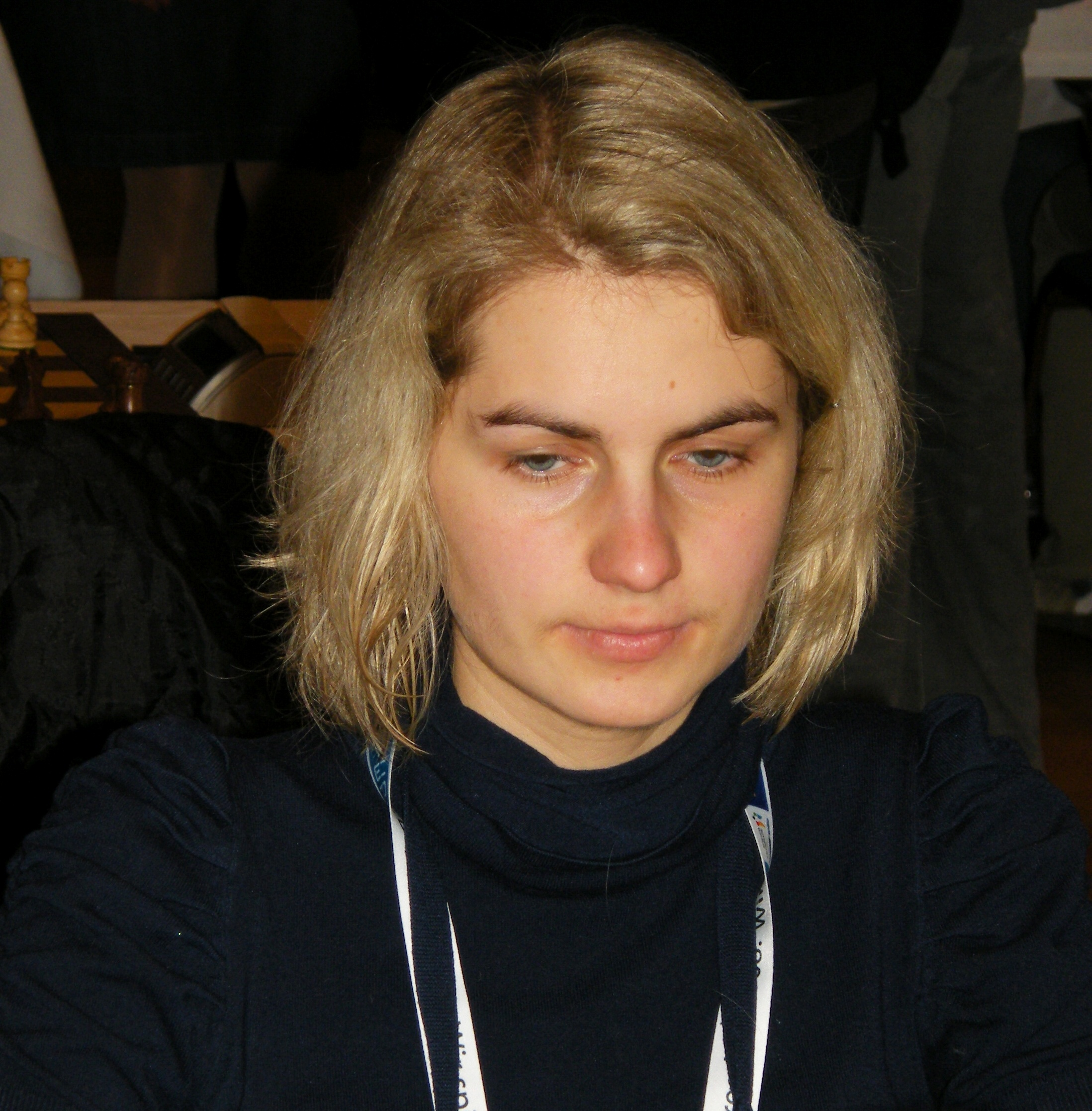
- Maksimova in 2008

Personal information
- Full name: Elena Maksimova-Klimets
- Born: 6 May 1988 (age 38) Minsk, Byelorussian SSR, Soviet Union

Chess career
- Country: Belarus
- Title: Woman FIDE Master (2005)
- FIDE rating: 2070 (March 2010)
- Peak rating: 2150 (July 2008)

Elena Maksimova (Russian: Елена Григорьевна Максимова; born 6 May 1988), née Klimets (Russian: Климец), also Maksimova-Klimets (Russian: Максимова-Климец), is a Belarusian chess player and journalist who holds the title of Woman FIDE Master (WFM, 2005).

== Biography ==
In 2000s Elena Maksimova was one of the leading Belarusian chess players. Elena Maksimova played for Belarus in the Women's Chess Olympiad:

- In 2008, at first reserve board in the 38th Chess Olympiad (women) in Dresden (+2, =3, −1).

In 2010, she graduated from Maxim Tank Belarusian State Pedagogical University Physics and Mathematics Department with master's degree. From 2011 Elena Maksimova lives in Moscow and worked as journalist from Russian chess portals chess-news.ru and chesspro.ru.
