= 38th Chess Olympiad =

2008 chess tournament in Dresden, Germany

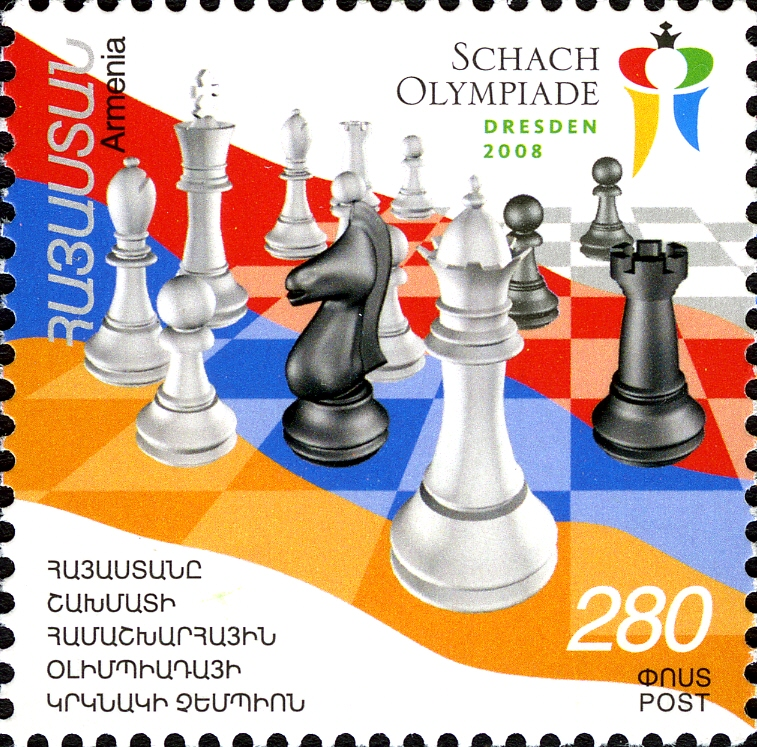
- Armenian stamp featuring the logo of the 38th Chess Olympiad (top)
- Host city: Dresden
- Country: Germany
- Nations: 141 (Open); 106 (Women)
- Teams: 146 (Open); 111 (Women)
- Athletes: 1,277
- Dates: 12–25 November 2008

Medalists

Team (Open)
- 1st place, gold medalist(s): Armenia
- 2nd place, silver medalist(s): Israel
- 3rd place, bronze medalist(s): United States

Team (Women)
- 1st place, gold medalist(s): Georgia
- 2nd place, silver medalist(s): Ukraine
- 3rd place, bronze medalist(s): United States

Individual (Open)
- (Armenia) Gabriel Sargissian

Individual (Women)
- (Georgia (country)) Maia Chiburdanidze

The 38th Chess Olympiad (German: Die 38. Schacholympiade), organized by FIDE and comprising an open and a women's tournament, as well as several other events designed to promote the game of chess, took place from 12 to 25 November 2008 in Dresden, Germany. There were 146 teams in the open event and 111 in the women's event. In total, 1277 players were registered.

Both tournament sections were officiated by international arbiter Ignatius Leong (Singapore). In a change from recent Olympiads, the number of rounds of the Swiss system were reduced from 13 to 11 with accelerated pairings. For the first time, the women's division, like the open division, was played over four boards per round, with each team allowed one alternate for a total of five players. In another first, the final rankings were determined by match points, not game points. In the event of a draw, the tie-break was decided by 1. Deducted Sonneborn-Berger; 2. Deducted sum of match points; 3. Game points.

The time control for each game permitted each player 90 minutes their first 40 moves and 30 minutes for the rest of the game, with an additional 30 seconds increment for each player after each move, beginning with the first. As a new rule, no draws by agreement were permitted before 30 moves had been completed. Yet there were games drawn as soon as the 16th move, formally drawn by repetition against which there was no rule. In addition, players who were not present at the board at the commencement of a round automatically forfeited the game. This rule was implemented to align chess with other sports events.

== Open event ==
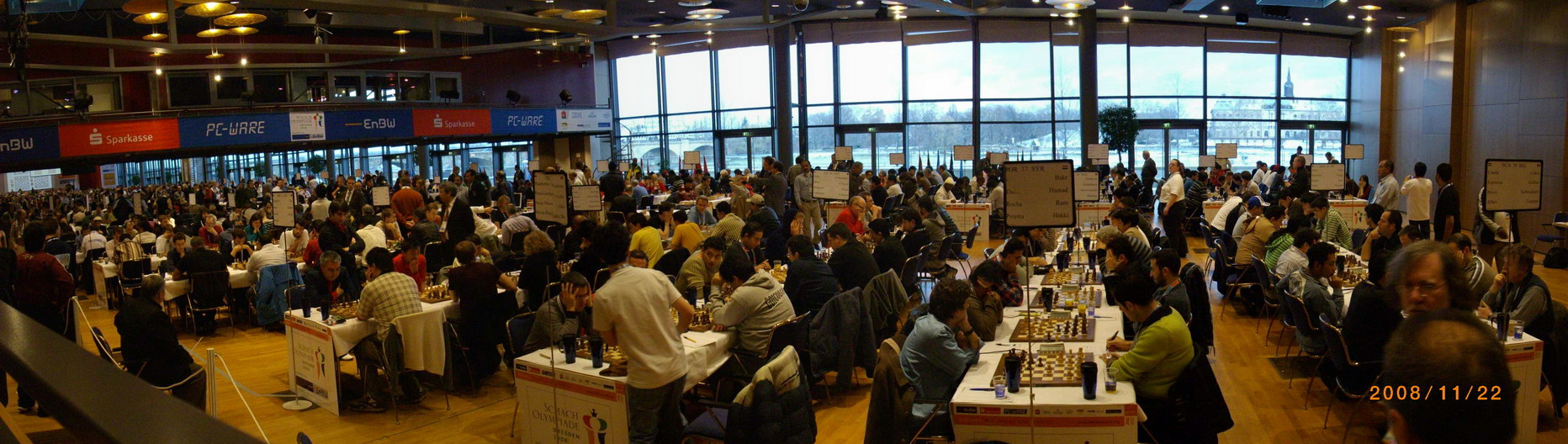
Dresden Olympiad Scene

The open division was contested by 146 teams representing 141 nations. Germany, as hosts, fielded three teams, whilst the International Braille Chess Association (IBCA), the International Physically Disabled Chess Association (IPCA), and the International Committee of Silent Chess (ICSC) each provided one squad. Morocco were signed up, but never appeared for their first round match and were disqualified.

Defending champions Armenia, once again led by Levon Aronian, clinched their second consecutive title. Despite being seeded only eighth, they won nine out of eleven matches, drew against fourth-placed Ukraine and lost only (1½-2½) to runners-up Israel, captained by Boris Gelfand. The Israelis finished one point behind Armenia. The United States, led by Gata Kamsky, took the bronze medals on a better tie break score than Vasyl Ivanchuk and the rest of the Ukrainian team after defeating Ukraine (3½-½) in the last round.

Once again, the Russian team under captain Vladimir Kramnik were the pre-tournament favourites but finished disappointingly in fifth place. Kramnik, having recently lost a world championship match, performed well below his rating, as did the rest of the team, except alternate Dmitry Yakovenko who won the reserve board.

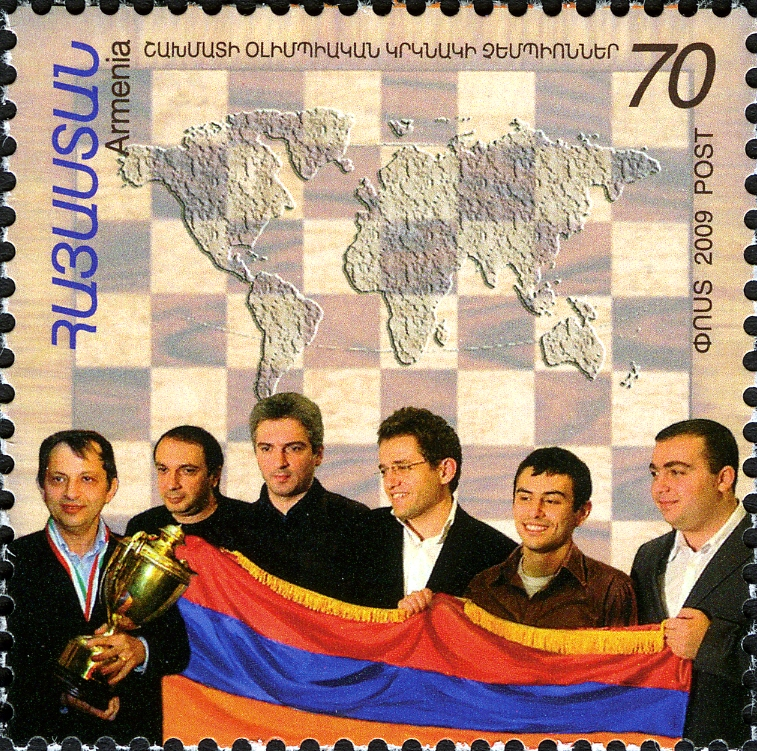
The winning Armenian team

Arguably the biggest surprise of the tournament was Vietnam, who weren't even seeded in the top 30, but still managed to finish in ninth place, aided somewhat by the new tournament structure which allotted them some weaker opponents, although they did manage a 2–2 result against China. The German hosts finished 13th, while India, without World Champion Viswanathan Anand, had to settle for 16th place.

Open event results, #1–#10
#	Country	Players	Average rating	MP	dSB
1	Armenia	Aronian, Akopian, Sargissian, Petrosian, Minasian	2677	19	
2	Israel	Gelfand, Roiz, Avrukh, Postny, Rodshtein	2682	18	
3	United States	Kamsky, Nakamura, Onischuk, Shulman, Akobian	2673	17	362.0
4	Ukraine	Ivanchuk, Karjakin, Eljanov, Efimenko, Volokitin	2729	17	348.5
5	Russia	Kramnik, Svidler, Grischuk, Morozevich, Yakovenko	2756	16	375.0
6	Azerbaijan	Radjabov, Mamedyarov, Gashimov, Guseinov, Mamedov	2709	16	359.5
7	China	Wang Yue, Bu Xiangzhi, Ni Hua, Wang Hao, Li Chao	2714	16	357.5
8	Hungary	Lékó, Polgár, Almási, Balogh, Berkes	2692	16	341.5
9	Vietnam	Nguyễn Ngọc Trường Sơn, Lê Quang Liêm, Đào Thiên Hải, Nguyễn Văn Huy, Tu Hoang Thong	2539	16	340.0
10	Spain	Shirov, Vallejo Pons, Illescas Córdoba, Khamrakulov, San Segundo Carrillo	2644	16	337.5

Open event results, #11–end (#146)
Rank	Country	Average rating	MP	dSB	dSMP
11	Georgia	2618	16	321.0	
12	Netherlands	2609	15	343.0	
13	Germany	2647	15	339.0	
14	Bulgaria	2691	15	327.5	
15	England	2629	15	320.0	
16	India	2634	15	310.0	
17	Slovenia	2583	15	288.0	
18	Belarus	2602	14	307.0	
19	Romania	2631	14	306.5	
20	Serbia	2604	14	302.0	
21	Norway	2611	14	300.0	
22	France	2690	14	295.0	
23	Cuba	2626	14	294.5	
24	Greece	2585	14	292.5	
25	Sweden	2576	14	286.0	
26	Montenegro	2522	14	279.0	
27	Croatia	2588	14	275.5	
28	Canada	2500	14	272.5	
29	Poland	2609	13	301.0	
30	Bosnia and Herzegovina	2577	13	294.0	
31	Slovakia	2587	13	290.0	
32	Finland	2491	13	287.5	
33	Estonia	2495	13	282.0	
34	Lithuania	2548	13	278.0	
35	Germany "C"	2506	13	276.5	122
36	Turkey	2496	13	276.5	121
37	Kazakhstan	2555	13	272.5	
38	Czech Republic	2611	13	270.5	
39	Denmark	2566	13	268.5	
40	Iran	2524	13	265.0	
41	Italy	2521	13	261.0	
42	Germany "B"	2523	13	259.0	
43	Moldova	2585	13	258.5	
44	Latvia	2522	13	257.5	
45	Austria	2486	13	252.5	
46	Philippines	2526	13	250.0	
47	Bangladesh	2486	13	249.0	
48	Paraguay	2415	13	220.5	
49	Colombia	2459	12	257.0	
50	Uzbekistan	2557	12	256.5	
51	Switzerland	2541	12	251.0	
52	Indonesia	2387	12	249.5	
53	Scotland	2512	12	249.0	
54	Brazil	2460	12	240.0	
55	Portugal	2441	12	237.5	
56	Egypt	2497	12	232.0	
57	Australia	2488	12	222.5	
58	South Africa	2315	12	220.5	
59	North Macedonia	2525	12	220.0	
60	Ireland	2452	12	218.5	
61	Faroe Islands	2364	12	213.5	
62	Singapore	2352	12	210.5	
63	United Arab Emirates	2332	12	191.0	
64	Iceland	2420	11	246.0	
65	Pakistan	2031	11	234.5	
66	Qatar	2400	11	225.5	
67	Venezuela	2444	11	224.5	
68	Costa Rica	2403	11	223.5	
69	Argentina	2572	11	221.5	
70	Belgium	2395	11	215.5	
71	Tajikistan	2358	11	207.0	
72	Ecuador	2408	11	206.0	
73	Mongolia	2372	11	188.5	
74	Mexico	2423	11	188.0	
75	Luxembourg	2286	11	177.5	
76	Jordan	2288	11	175.5	
77	Japan	2206	11	174.5	
78	El Salvador	2300	11	173.5	
79	ICSC	2305	11	166.5	
80	Jamaica	2217	11	165.0	
81	Wales	2263	11	158.0	
82	Kyrgyzstan	2337	10	222.5	
83	Turkmenistan	2355	10	200.5	
84	Syria	2312	10	192.5	
85	Iraq	2290	10	188.5	
86	Bolivia	2313	10	183.5	
87	Guatemala	2263	10	182.5	
88	IPCA	2358	10	178.5	
89	Algeria	2340	10	174.0	
90	Dominican Republic	2358	10	167.5	
91	IBCA	2318	10	166.0	
92	Albania	2102	10	162.5	
93	Panama	2206	10	161.0	
94	Sri Lanka	2169	10	160.0	
95	Puerto Rico	2228	10	159.0	
96	Malaysia	2362	10	157.5	
97	New Zealand	2370	10	152.0	
98	Angola	2231	10	151.5	
99	Lebanon	2312	10	150.5	
100	Thailand	2272	10	140.5	
101	Palestine	2306	9	177.5	
102	Nigeria	1988	9	174.0	
103	Botswana	2185	9	173.0	
104	Monaco	2275	9	171.0	
105	Tunisia	2310	9	163.5	
106	Yemen	2332	9	163.5	
107	Afghanistan	2095	9	152.0	
108	Nepal	2022	9	148.0	
109	South Korea	2068	9	146.5	
110	Andorra	2256	9	144.0	
111	Libya	2145	9	141.0	
112	Netherlands Antilles	2168	9	135.5	
113	Malta	2177	9	134.0	
114	Uruguay	2287	9	130.5	
115	Jersey	1742	9	127.0	
116	Nicaragua	2238	9	120.0	
117	Zambia	2082	8	140.5	
118	Barbados	2142	8	136.0	
119	Mozambique	1775	8	132.0	
120	Uganda	2175	8	126.0	
121	San Marino	1907	8	124.5	
122	Cyprus	2144	8	120.0	
123	Namibia	1937	8	116.5	
124	Ethiopia	1769	8	108.0	
125	Trinidad and Tobago	2173	8	106.5	
126	Guernsey	2055	8	97.0	
127	British Virgin Islands	1952	8	95.5	
128	Honduras	1968	7	129.0	
129	Mauritania	2139	7	116.0	
130	Suriname	2141	7	110.0	
131	Kenya	2164	7	109.0	
132	Hong Kong	2023	7	106.0	
133	Papua New Guinea	1896	7	94.5	
134	Macau	2020	7	94.0	
135	Aruba	2034	7	92.0	
136	Chinese Taipei	1846	7	85.0	
137	Bermuda	1978	7	81.0	
138	Malawi	1400	6	116.5	
139	Liechtenstein	2086	6	88.0	
140	Ghana	1400	6	77.0	
141	United States Virgin Islands	1400	6	43.0	
142	Gabon	1400	5	87.0	
143	Fiji	1923	5	73.0	
144	Seychelles	1710	5	68.5	
145	Madagascar	1400	4		
146	Rwanda	1608	3		

=== Group prizes ===
In addition to the overall medals, prizes were given out to the best teams in five different seeding groups—in other words, the teams who exceeded their seeding the most. Overall medal winners were not eligible for group prizes.

Group Prizes
Group	Seeding range	Team	MP	dSB
A	1–29	Ukraine	17	348.5
B	30–58	Vietnam	16	340.0
C	59–87	Paraguay	13	220.5
D	88–116	Luxembourg	11	177.5
E	117–146	Pakistan	11	234.5

=== Individual medals ===
For the first time, all board prizes were given out according to performance ratings. Accordingly, there was no overall prize, although Sargissian on the third board had the best performance of all players at the tournament:

- Board 1: (Hungary) Peter Leko 2834
- Board 2: (Armenia) Vladimir Akopian 2813
- Board 3: (Armenia) Gabriel Sargissian 2869
- Board 4: (Montenegro) Dragiša Blagojević 2792
- Reserve: (Russia) Dmitry Yakovenko 2794

== Women's event ==
The women's division was contested by 111 teams representing 106 nations. Germany, as hosts, fielded three teams, whilst the International Braille Chess Association (IBCA), the International Physically Disabled Chess Association (IPCA), and the International Committee of Silent Chess (ICSC) each provided one squad.

Georgia won their fourth title, 12 years after the third one, narrowly defeating Ukraine on tie breaks. The two teams didn't meet during the tournament, but when the Ukrainians only drew their penultimate match against Serbia while the Georgians defeated former champions China (2½–1½), the gold was Georgia's to lose. In the last round they record a win (3–1) against the Serbian, who thus came to play a crucial role in the fight for the title, despite finishing in seventh place themselves. The Georgian team were led by former World Champion, 47-year-old Maia Chiburdanidze, who delivered a stellar performance, winning the top board with the best performance of the tournament.

The United States clinched the bronze medals on tie breaks, just ahead of Russia (with newly crowned World Champion Alexandra Kosteniuk) and Poland. The German hosts finished in 21st place.

Women's section results, #1–#10
#	Country	Players	Average rating	MP	dSB
1	Georgia	Chiburdanidze, Dzagnidze, Javakhishvili, Lomineishvili, Khukhashvili	2476	18	411.5
2	Ukraine	Lagno, Zhukova, Ushenina, Gaponenko, Zdebskaya	2486	18	406.5
3	United States	Krush, Zatonskih, Goletiani, Rohonyan, Abrahamyan	2396	17	390.5
4	Russia	Kosteniuk, T. Kosintseva, N. Kosintseva, Korbut, Pogonina	2495	17	367.0
5	Poland	Soćko, Rajlich, Zawadzka, Majdan, Przeździecka	2386	17	364.5
6	Armenia	Danielian, Mkrtchian, Aginian, Galojan, Andriasian	2397	16	353.0
7	Serbia	Marić, Bojković, Stojanović, Chelushkina, Benderać	2386	16	318.5
8	China	Hou Yifan, Zhao Xue, Shen Yang, Ju Wenjun, Tan Zhongyi	2486	15	392.5
9	Israel	Klinova, Borsuk, Igla, Vasiliev, Efroimski	2304	15	325.0
10	Belarus	Sharevich, Popova, Azarova, Berlin, Klimets	2278	15	317.5

Women's section results, #11–end (#111)
Rank	Country	Average rating	MP	dSB	dSMP
11	Romania	2348	15	306.5	
12	Italy	2245	15	280.0	
13	France	2427	14	336.5	
14	Hungary	2389	14	321.0	
15	India	2388	14	320.5	
16	Slovakia	2348	14	299.5	
17	Mongolia	2161	14	289.0	
18	Netherlands	2323	14	286.0	
19	Bulgaria	2375	14	282.0	
20	Croatia	2259	14	281.5	
21	Germany	2379	14	279.0	
22	Uzbekistan	2181	14	267.0	
23	Spain	2296	14	266.5	
24	Greece	2317	13	307.5	
25	Cuba	2289	13	288.0	
26	Vietnam	2292	13	272.5	
27	Austria	2231	13	269.5	
28	Latvia	2264	13	266.5	
29	Argentina	2260	13	262.0	
30	Turkey	2184	13	249.5	
31	Azerbaijan	2261	13	246.5	
32	Estonia	2174	13	245.5	
33	Moldova	2246	13	238.0	
34	Germany "B"	2159	13	236.0	
35	Montenegro	2242	13	227.5	
36	Czech Republic	2321	12	270.0	
37	Slovenia	2359	12	260.0	
38	Sweden	2317	12	258.5	
39	Iran	2194	12	258.0	
40	Switzerland	2210	12	257.5	
41	Colombia	2179	12	255.5	
42	Indonesia	2021	12	237.5	
43	Philippines	2134	12	232.0	
44	Luxembourg	2185	12	227.5	
45	Kazakhstan	2240	12	226.5	
46	Portugal	2145	12	218.0	
47	Germany "C"	2142	12	208.5	
48	Brazil	2077	12	196.0	
49	Kyrgyzstan	2093	12	182.0	
50	England	2248	11	250.0	
51	Lithuania	2294	11	239.0	
52	Ecuador	2223	11	230.0	
53	Norway	2193	11	224.0	
54	Finland	2014	11	205.0	
55	Dominican Republic	2022	11	200.5	
56	Scotland	1986	11	199.5	
57	South Africa	1938	11	198.0	
58	Turkmenistan	2063	11	194.5	
59	Bosnia and Herzegovina	2110	11	193.0	
60	Iceland	2029	11	191.0	
61	IPCA	2018	11	180.0	
62	New Zealand	1912	11	174.5	
63	Australia	2122	10	209.0	
64	El Salvador	2098	10	199.5	
65	Canada	2124	10	190.0	
66	Mexico	2106	10	184.0	
67	Venezuela	2108	10	178.0	
68	Guatemala	1920	10	176.0	
69	IBCA	2035	10	168.0	
70	Denmark	2098	10	163.5	
71	Bolivia	1978	10	162.0	
72	ICSC	2130	10	161.0	
73	Algeria	1936	10	158.0	
74	Bangladesh	2093	10	156.0	
75	Tajikistan	1767	10	155.0	104
76	Syria	1808	10	155.0	96
77	Albania	2004	10	151.0	
78	Sri Lanka	1850	9	169.5	
79	Wales	1891	9	145.0	
80	Uruguay	1882	9	140.0	107
81	Puerto Rico	1870	9	140.0	103
82	Lebanon	1802	9	139.0	
83	Costa Rica	1861	9	129.0	
84	Paraguay	1725	9	127.0	
85	Qatar	1656	9	121.0	
86	Chinese Taipei	1556	9	118.5	
87	Iraq	1706	9	117.5	
88	Egypt	1842	8	142.0	
89	United Arab Emirates	1805	8	129.0	
90	Angola	1506	8	124.0	
91	Tunisia	1490	8	119.0	
92	Yemen	1400	8	114.5	
93	Botswana	1529	8	113.5	
94	Ireland	1534	8	90.5	
95	Barbados	1400	8	81.0	
96	Japan	1621	7	119.5	
97	Nigeria	1400	7	111.0	
98	Honduras	1400	7	106.0	
99	Suriname	1498	7	105.0	
100	Malta	1731	7	101.5	
101	Libya	1400	7	92.5	
102	Pakistan	1400	7	90.0	
103	Panama	1641	7	82.5	
104	Macau	1554	7	79.5	
105	Fiji	1551	7	74.5	
106	South Korea	1469	7	66.5	
107	Trinidad and Tobago	1667	7	58.0	
108	Aruba	1400	6		
109	Kenya	1400	5		
110	Seychelles	1400	3		
111	Afghanistan	1400	1		

=== Individual medals ===
For the first time, all board prizes were given out according to performance ratings. Accordingly, there was no overall prize, although reborn ex-champion Chiburdanidze on the top board had the best performance of all players at the tournament:

- Board 1: (Georgia (country)) Maia Chiburdanidze 2715
- Board 2: (United States) Anna Zatonskih 2571
- Board 3: (Russia) Nadezhda Kosintseva 2591
- Board 4: (Poland) Joanna Majdan 2621
- Reserve: (Ukraine) Natalia Zdebskaya 2528

== Overall title ==
The Nona Gaprindashvili Trophy is awarded to the nation that has the highest total number of match points in the open and women's divisions combined. Where two or more teams are tied, they are ordered by the same tie breakers as in the two separate events.

The trophy, named after the former women's World Champion (1961–78), was created by FIDE in 1997.

#	Team	MP	dSB
1	Ukraine	35	755.0
2	Armenia	35	753.5
3	United States	34	

== Bibliography ==
- Harald Fietz, Josip Asik, Anna Burtasova: Olympiad United! Dresden 2008. Verlag Schach Wissen, Berlin 2009. ISBN 978-3-9813348-0-7
