= Andorran Chess Championship =

The Andorran Chess Championship was first held in 1965. It is organized by FEVA (Catalan: Federació d'Escacs Valls d'Andorra), the chess federation of Andorra, which was founded in 1967.

== Winners since 2000 ==
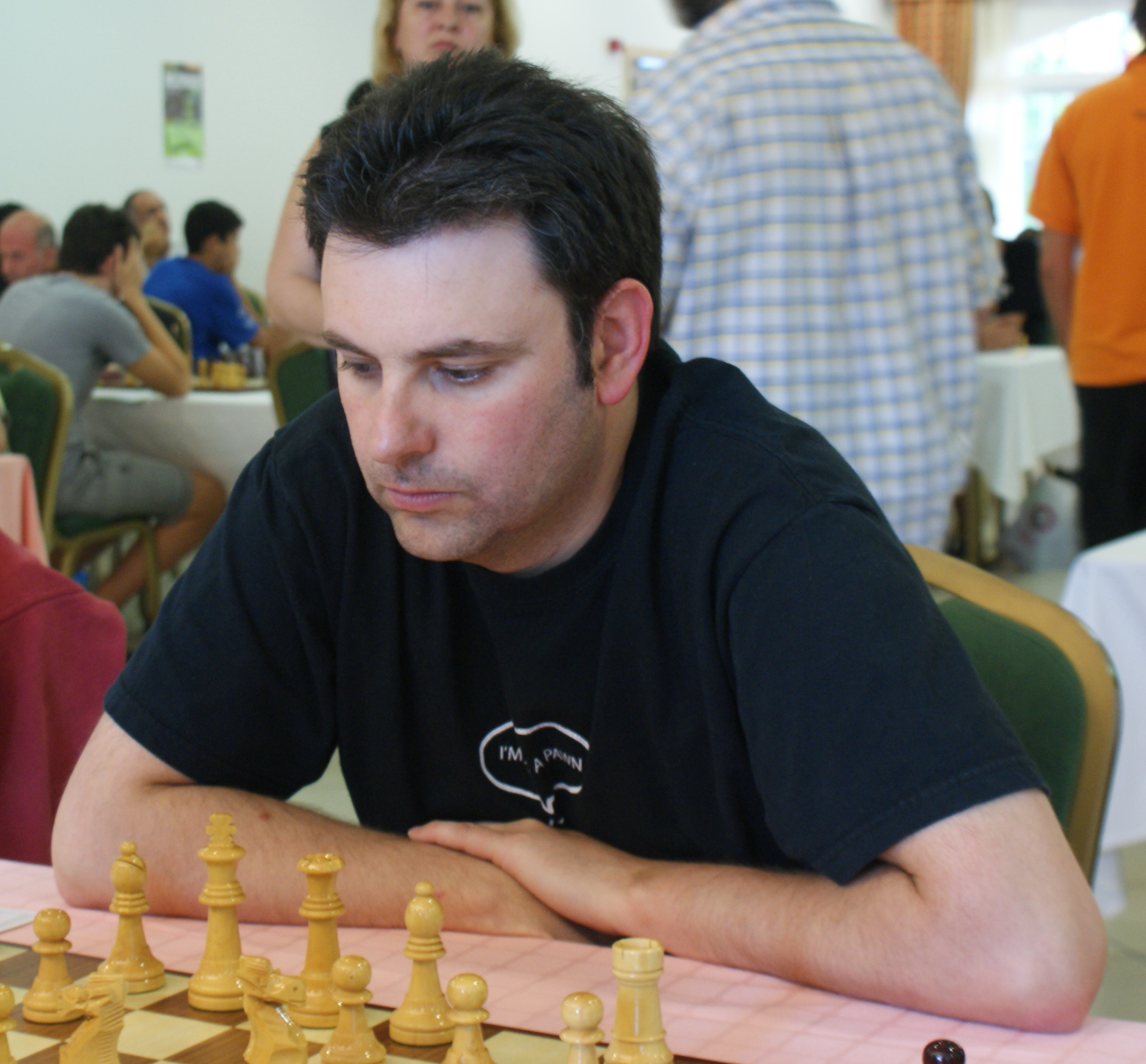
Grandmaster Òscar de la Riva, seven-time Andorran champion since 2000

Year	Champion
2000	Óscar de la Riva
2001	Óscar de la Riva
2002	Daniel José Queraltó
2003	Josep Oms i Pallisé
2004	Josep Oms i Pallisé
2005	Josep Oms i Pallisé
2006	Josep Oms i Pallisé
2007	Òscar de la Riva
2008	Joan Mellado Triviño
2009	Raül Garcia
2010	Daniel José Queraltó
2011	Raül Garcia
2012	Òscar de la Riva
2013	Raül Garcia
2014	Òscar de la Riva
2015	Óscar de la Riva, Robert Alomà
2016	Robert Alomà
2017	Óscar de la Riva, Robert Alomà
2018	Jordi Fluvià
2019	Robert Alomà
