= Salome Melia =

Georgian chess player

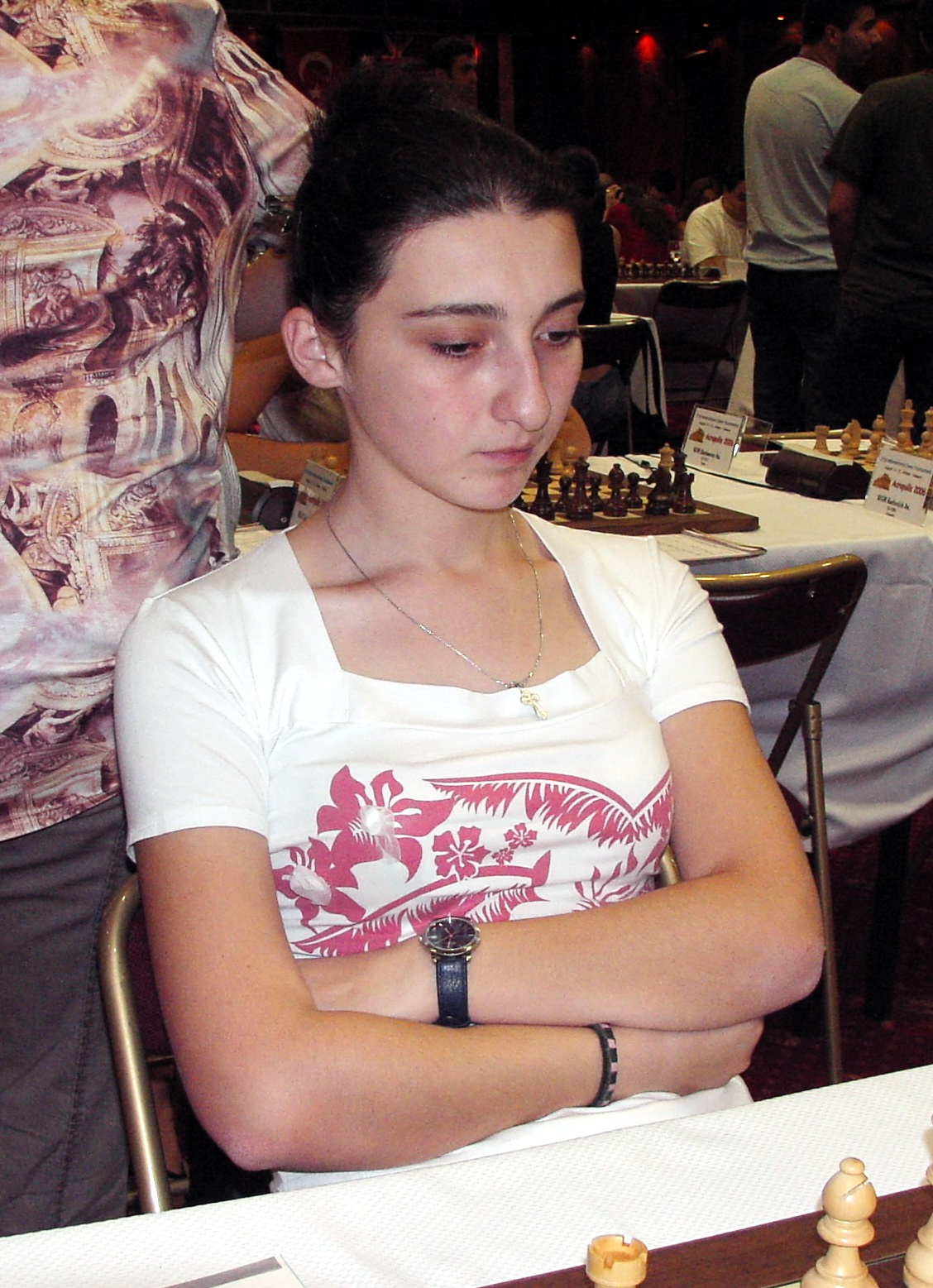
- Salome Melia at Acropolis 2006

Personal information
- Born: April 14, 1987 (age 39) Batumi, Georgia

Chess career
- Country: Georgia
- Title: International Master (2008); Woman Grandmaster (2005)
- Peak rating: 2475 (August 2014)

Salome Melia (Georgian: სალომე მელია; born 14 April 1987 in Batumi) is a Georgian chess player who holds the FIDE titles of International Master (IM) and Woman Grandmaster (WGM). She was a member of the gold medal-winning Georgian team at the 2015 Women's World Team Chess Championship in Chengdu.

She won twice the European Under-18 Girls Championship, in 2004 and 2005. Melia won the silver medal at the Women's European Individual Chess Championship in 2013 and the bronze medal in 2014. She has also won the Women's Georgian Chess Championship in 2008 and 2010.
