= Tatiana Berlin =

Belarusian chess player (born 1977)

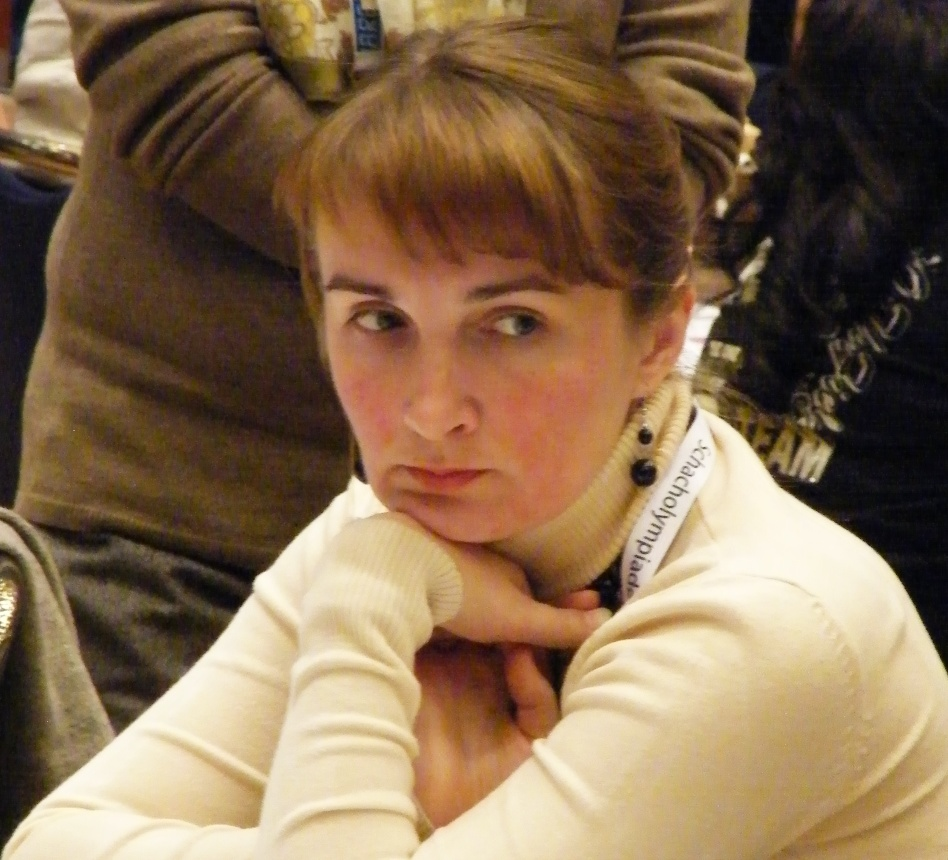
- Berlin in 2008

Personal information
- Born: 9 April 1977 (age 49) Kobryn, Byelorussian SSR, Soviet Union

Chess career
- Country: Belarus
- Title: Woman International Master (2005)
- FIDE rating: 2127 (September 2018)
- Peak rating: 2258 (July 2006)

Tatiana Berlin (Belarusian: Таццяна Берлін; born 9 April 1977), née Martyniuk (Belarusian: Мартынюк), is a Belarusian chess player who holds the FIDE title of Woman International Master (WIM). She is the 37th Chess Olympiad (women) individual gold medal winner (2006).

== Biography ==
Tatiana Berlin played for Belarus in European Youth Chess Championships and World Youth Chess Championships in the different age groups. She graduated from Brest State University Faculty of mathematics and informatics. After graduation Tatiana Berlin worked as a children's chess trainer at Kobryn. Later she returned to Brest and became a lecturer at a Brest State University. She is married and has a son.

She played for Belarus in the Women's Chess Olympiads:

- In 2006, at first reserve board in the 37th Chess Olympiad (women) in Turin (+7, =0, -1) and won individual gold medal,
- In 2008, at fourth board in the 38th Chess Olympiad (women) in Dresden (+5, =3, -2).

Since 2009, she rarely participates in chess tournaments.
