= Joanna Majdan-Gajewska =

Polish chess player (born 1988)

Joanna Majdan
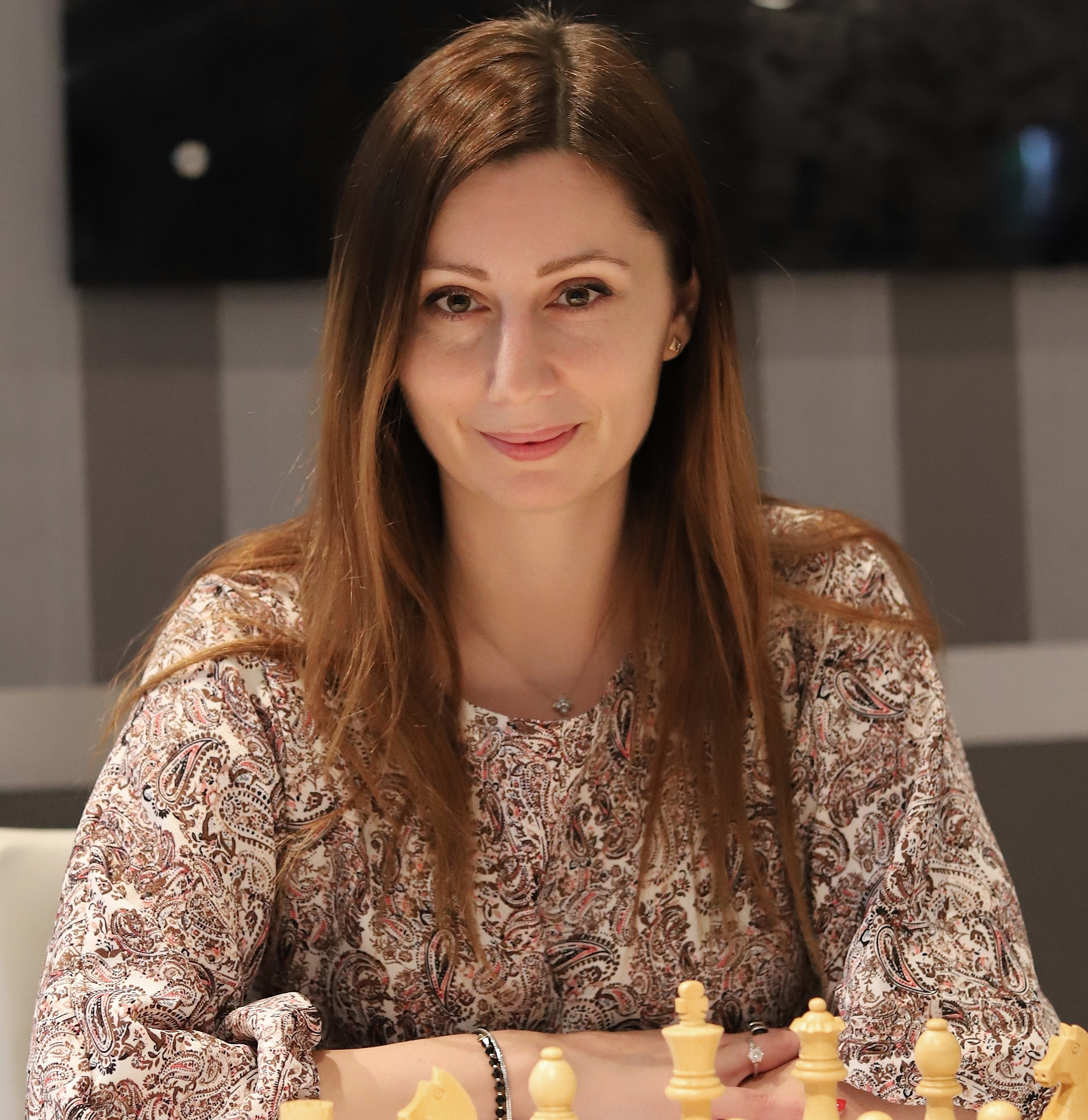

Personal information
- Born: 9 June 1988 (age 38) Koszalin, Poland
- Spouse: Grzegorz Gajewski

Chess career
- Country: Poland
- Title: Woman Grandmaster (2009)
- Peak rating: 2420 (November 2013)

Joanna Majdan-Gajewska (née Majdan; born 9 June 1988) is a Polish chess player with the title of Woman Grandmaster (WGM). She was a member of the national team at the 2006 Chess Olympiad (women's section) in Turin, where she scored 6 points from 9 games. In 2008, she participated at the women's Dresden Chess Olympiad where she scored an excellent 9½ points out of 11 games winning the individual gold medal for the best player on the fourth board. In October 2009 she played at the 8th European Team Chess Championship in Novi Sad, Serbia and won an individual gold medal for being the best player on board five.
