= Josep Oms Pallise =

Spanish chess grandmaster (born 1973)

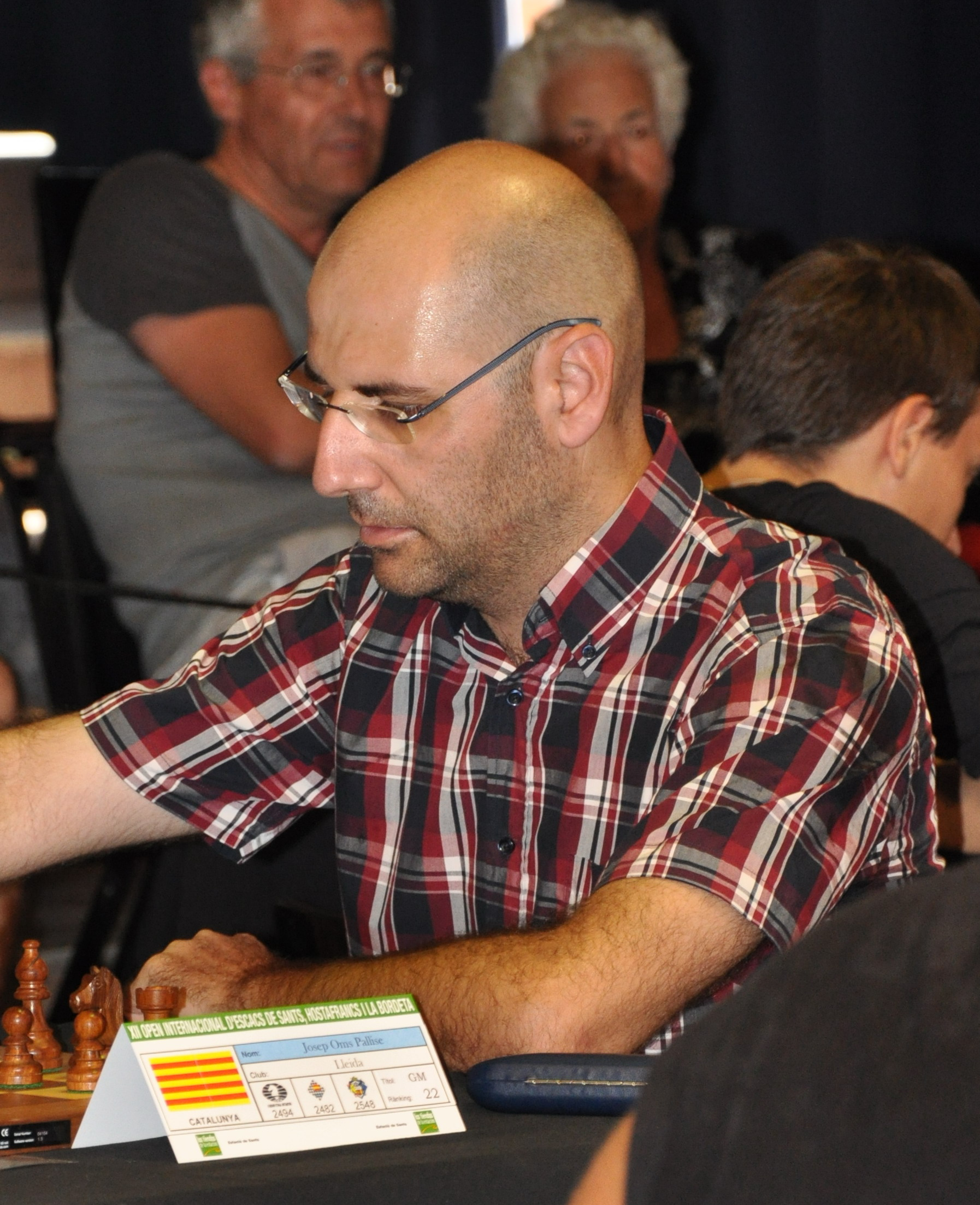
- Josep Oms Pallise in 2010

Personal information
- Born: 20 July 1973 (age 52) Lleida, Catalonia, Spain

Chess career
- Country: Spain; Andorra (2003–2007)
- Title: Grandmaster (2007)
- FIDE rating: 2425 (July 2026)
- Peak rating: 2528 (November 2010)

Josep Oms Pallise (born 20 July 1973) is a Spanish chess player who holds the title of Grandmaster (GM) (2007) and from 2003 till 2007 played for Andorra. He is four-times Andorran Chess Championship winner (2003–2006) and Chess Olympiad individual gold medal winner (2006).

== Biography ==
In 1993, Josep Oms Pallise won Spanish Junior Chess Championship and played for Spain in European Junior Chess Championship. In 2000, he shared 2nd place in Catalonia Chess Championship. Josep Oms Pallise four time in row won Andorran Chess Championship (2003–2006). In 2004, he shared 3rd place in Spanish Chess Championship. Josep Oms Pallise is winner of many international chess tournament, include Valencia (1996), Zaragoza (1998, 1999), Seville (2000), Barcelona (2008).

Josep Oms Pallise played for Andorra in the Chess Olympiads:

- In 2004, at second board in the 36th Chess Olympiad in Calvià (+6, =2, -4),
- In 2006, at second board in the 37th Chess Olympiad in Turin (+7, =4, -0) and won individual gold medal.

In 1997, he was awarded the FIDE International Master (IM) title and received the FIDE Grandmaster (GM) title ten years later. Also he is FIDE Trainer (2014).
