= World Team Chess Championship =

International team chess event

The World Team Chess Championship is an international team chess event, eligible for the participation of 10 countries whose chess federations dominate their continent. It is played every two years. In chess, this tournament and the Chess Olympiads are the most important international tournaments for teams.

The strongest national teams in the world participate, and also some teams represent an entire continent. A full round is played by the teams, meaning that each team plays against every other team. At the first tournament, in 1985, teams consisted of six players; since then, teams have been reduced to four players. Reserve players are permitted.

From 1985, the championship was held every four years; since 2011, it has been held every two years. Since 2007, there has been a separate championship for women teams, which is also held every two years.
Since 2007, the final scores depend on the team results; before 2007, the individual scores determined the final ranking.

== Results ==
All data from OlimpBase World Team Chess Championship.

=== Open section team medals ===
Year	Location	Gold	Silver	Bronze
1985	(Switzerland) Lucerne; Details	Soviet Union; Anatoly Karpov; Artur Yusupov; Rafael Vaganian; Andrei Sokolov; Alexander Beliavsky; Vasily Smyslov; Alexander Chernin; Lev Polugaevsky	Hungary; Lajos Portisch; Zoltán Ribli; Gyula Sax; Jozsef Pinter; András Adorján; Ivan Farago; István Csom; Attila Grószpéter	England; Tony Miles; John Nunn; Jonathan Speelman; Nigel Short; Jonathan Mestel; Murray Chandler; James Plaskett; Glenn Flear
1989	(Switzerland) Lucerne; Details	Soviet Union; Anatoly Karpov; Alexander Beliavsky; Jaan Ehlvest; Rafael Vaganian; Vassily Ivanchuk; Mikhail Gurevich	Yugoslavia; Ljubomir Ljubojević; Predrag Nikolić; Petar Popovic; Dragoljub Velimirovic; Božidar Ivanović; Branko Damljanovic	England; Nigel Short; Jonathan Speelman; John Nunn; Murray Chandler; Michael Adams; Julian Hodgson
1993	(Switzerland) Lucerne; Details	United States; Gata Kamsky; Alex Yermolinsky; Boris Gulko; Gregory Kaidanov; Joel Benjamin; Larry Christiansen	Ukraine; Vassily Ivanchuk; Vladimir Malaniuk; Oleg Romanishin; Vladimir Tukmakov; Viacheslav Eingorn; Artur Frolov	Russia; Vladimir Kramnik; Alexander Khalifman; Evgeny Bareev; Sergey Dolmatov; Alexei Dreev; Alexey Vyzmanavin
1997	(Switzerland) Lucerne; Details	Russia; Evgeny Bareev; Peter Svidler; Alexander Khalifman; Sergei Rublevsky; Alexei Dreev; Vadim Zvjaginsev	United States; Alex Yermolinsky; Joel Benjamin; Boris Gulko; Nick De Firmian; Gregory Kaidanov; Larry Christiansen	Armenia; Vladimir Akopian; Rafael Vaganian; Smbat Lputian; Artashes Minasian; Ashot Anastasian; Melikset Khachiyan
2001	(Armenia) Yerevan; Details	Ukraine; Vassily Ivanchuk; Ruslan Ponomariov; Vladimir Baklan; Viacheslav Eingorn; Oleg Romanishin; Vadim Malakhatko	Russia; Peter Svidler; Alexei Dreev; Alexander Grischuk; Sergei Rublevsky; Konstantin Sakaev; Alexander Motylev	Armenia; Vladimir Akopian; Rafael Vaganian; Smbat Lputian; Karen Asrian; Ashot Anastasian; Artashes Minasian
2005	(Israel) Beersheba; Details	Russia; Peter Svidler; Alexei Dreev; Alexander Grischuk; Alexander Morozevich; Evgeny Bareev; Sergei Rublevsky	China; Bu Xiangzhi; Zhang Pengxiang; Ni Hua; Zhang Zhong; Zhou Jianchao; Liang Chong	Armenia; Levon Aronian; Vladimir Akopian; Karen Asrian; Rafael Vaganian; Smbat Lputyan; Ashot Anastasian
2009	(Turkey) Bursa; Details	Russia Alexander Grischuk; Dmitry Jakovenko; Alexander Morozevich; Evgeny Tomashevsky; Vladimir Malakhov; Nikita Vitiugov	United States Hikaru Nakamura; Alexander Onischuk; Yuri Shulman; Varuzhan Akobian; Robert Hess; Ray Robson	India Pentala Harikrishna; Surya Shekhar Ganguly; Krishnan Sasikiran; Geetha Narayanan Gopal; Subramanian Arun Prasad; Baskaran Adhiban
2011	(China) Ningbo; Details	Armenia Levon Aronian; Sergei Movsesian; Vladimir Akopian; Gabriel Sargissian; Robert Hovhannisyan	China Wang Hao; Wang Yue; Li Chao; Yu Yangyi; Ding Liren	Ukraine Vassily Ivanchuk; Pavel Eljanov; Zahar Efimenko; Alexander Moiseenko; Alexander Areshchenko
2013	(Turkey) Antalya; Details	Russia Vladimir Kramnik; Sergey Karjakin; Alexander Grischuk; Ian Nepomniachtchi; Nikita Vitiugov	China Li Chao; Ding Liren; Wang Yue; Bu Xiangzhi; Yu Yangyi	Ukraine Vassily Ivanchuk; Anton Korobov; Alexander Moiseenko; Yuriy Kryvoruchko; Alexander Areshchenko
2015	(Armenia) Tsaghkadzor; Details	China Ding Liren; Yu Yangyi; Bu Xiangzhi; Wei Yi; Wen Yang	Ukraine Ruslan Ponomariov; Vassily Ivanchuk; Pavel Eljanov; Yuriy Kryvoruchko; Alexander Moiseenko	Armenia Levon Aronian; Gabriel Sargissian; Sergei Movsesian; Vladimir Akopian; Hrant Melkumyan
2017	(Russia) Khanty-Mansiysk; Details	China Ding Liren; Yu Yangyi; Wei Yi; Li Chao; Wen Yang	Russia Peter Svidler; Ian Nepomniachtchi; Nikita Vitiugov; Maxim Matlakov; Vladimir Fedoseev	Poland Radosław Wojtaszek; Jan-Krzysztof Duda; Kacper Piorun; Mateusz Bartel; Grzegorz Gajewski
2019	(Kazakhstan) Astana; Details	Russia Sergey Karjakin; Ian Nepomniachtchi; Alexander Grischuk; Dmitry Andreikin; Vladislav Artemiev	England Michael Adams; Luke McShane; David Howell; Gawain Jones; Jon Speelman	China Ding Liren; Yu Yangyi; Wei Yi; Bu Xiangzhi; Ni Hua
2022	Jerusalem; Details	China Lu Shanglei; Xu Xiangyu; Bai Jinshi; Li Di; Wen Yang	Uzbekistan Nodirbek Yakubboev; Javokhir Sindarov; Shamsiddin Vokhidov; Jakhongir Vakhidov; Ortik Nigmatov	Spain Jaime Santos Latasa; David Antón Guijarro; Alexei Shirov; Daniil Yuffa; Miguel Santos Ruiz

=== Women's team medals ===
Year	Location	Gold	Silver	Bronze
2007	(Russia) Yekaterinburg; Details	China; Hou Yifan; Zhao Xue; Shen Yang; Ruan Lufei; Huang Qian	Russia; Tatiana Kosintseva; Nadezhda Kosintseva; Ekaterina Kovalevskaya; Ekaterina Korbut; Elena Tairova	Ukraine; Kateryna Lahno; Anna Ushenina; Inna Gaponenko; Tatjana Vasilevich; Oksana Vozovic
2009	(China) Ningbo; Details	China; Hou Yifan; Zhao Xue; Shen Yang; Ju Wenjun; Huang Qian	Russia; Tatiana Kosintseva; Nadezhda Kosintseva; Ekaterina Kovalevskaya; Marina Romanko; Valentina Gunina	Ukraine; Anna Ushenina; Natalia Zhukova; Inna Yanovska; Mariya Muzychuk; Natalia Zdebskaya
2011	(Turkey) Mardin; Details	China; Hou Yifan; Ju Wenjun; Zhao Xue; Tan Zhongyi; Zhang Xiaowen	Russia; Nadezhda Kosintseva; Tatiana Kosintseva; Alexandra Kosteniuk; Valentina Gunina; Natalia Pogonina	Georgia; Nana Dzagnidze; Lela Javakhishvili; Bela Khotenashvili; Nino Khurtsidze; Salome Melia
2013	(Kazakhstan) Astana; Details	Ukraine; Kateryna Lahno; Anna Ushenina; Mariya Muzychuk; Natalia Zhukova; Inna Gaponenko	China; Ju Wenjun; Huang Qian; Tan Zhongyi; Guo Qi; Shen Yang	Russia; Valentina Gunina; Alexandra Kosteniuk; Natalia Pogonina; Alisa Galliamova; Olga Girya
2015	(China) Chengdu; Details	Georgia; Bela Khotenashvili; Lela Javakhishvili; Meri Arabidze; Nino Batsiashvili; Salome Melia	Russia; Valentina Gunina; Alexandra Kosteniuk; Natalija Pogonina; Aleksandra Goryachkina; Olga Girya	China; Ju Wenjun; Tan Zhongyi; Shen Yang; Lei Tingjie; Ding Yixin
2017	(Russia) Khanty-Mansiysk; Details	Russia; Alexandra Kosteniuk; Kateryna Lagno; Valentina Gunina; Aleksandra Goryachkina; Olga Girya	China; Ju Wenjun; Tan Zhongyi; Zhao Xue; Lei Tingjie; Guo Qi	Georgia; Nana Dzagnidze; Lela Javakhishvili; Bela Khotenashvili; Nino Batsiashvili; Salome Melia
2019	(Kazakhstan) Astana; Details	China; Tan Zhongyi; Shen Yang; Huang Qian; Lei Tingjie; Ding Yixin	Russia; Kateryna Lagno; Alexandra Kosteniuk; Valentina Gunina; Aleksandra Goryachkina; Olga Girya	Georgia; Bela Khotenashvili; Meri Arabidze; Lela Javakhishvili; Nino Batsiashvili; Salome Melia
2021	(Spain) Sitges; Details	Russia; Aleksandra Goryachkina; Alexandra Kosteniuk; Kateryna Lagno; Polina Shuvalova; Alina Kashlinskaya	India; Harika Dronavalli; Vaishali Rameshbabu; Tania Sachdev; Bhakti Kulkarni; Mary Ann Gomes	Georgia; Nana Dzagnidze; Nino Batsiashvili; Meri Arabidze; Lela Javakhishvili; Salome Melia; Ukraine; Anna Muzychuk; Mariya Muzychuk; Anna Ushenina; Iulija Osmak; Nataliya Buksa
2023	(Poland) Bydgoszcz; Details	Georgia; Bella Khotenashvili; Meri Arabidze; Nino Batsiashvili; Lela Javakhishvili; Salome Melia	Kazakhstan; Bibisara Assaubayeva; Meruert Kamalidenova; Xeniya Balabayeva; Alua Nurmanova; Assel Serikbay; Amina Kairbekova	France; Deimante Daulyte Cornette; Anastasia Savina; Sophie Milliet; Mitra Hejazipour; Natacha Benmesbah; Silvia Alexieva
2025	(Spain) Linares; Details	FIDE; Aleksandra Goryachkina; Kateryna Lagno; Polina Shuvalova; Leya Garifullina; Anna Shukhman; Olga Girya	Azerbaijan; Ulviyya Fataliyeva; Govhar Beydullayeva; Khanim Balajayeva; Gulnar Mammadova; Ayan Allahverdiyeva; Ilaha Kadimova	China; Hou Yifan; Song Yuxin; Lu Miaoyi; Guo Qi; Zhai Mo; Li Xueyi

== Medal table ==
=== Open section table ===
The table contains the men's teams ranked by the medals won at the World Team Championships.

Rank	Nation	Gold	Silver	Bronze	Total
1	Russia	5	2	1	8
2	China	3	3	1	7
3	Soviet Union	2	0	0	2
4	Ukraine	1	2	2	5
5	United States	1	2	0	3
6	Armenia	1	0	4	5
7	England	0	1	2	3
8	Hungary	0	1	0	1
8	Uzbekistan	0	1	0	1
8	Yugoslavia	0	1	0	1
11	India	0	0	1	1
11	Poland	0	0	1	1
11	Spain	0	0	1	1
Totals (13 entries)		13	13	13	39

=== Women's section table ===
The table contains the women's teams ranked by the medals won at the World Team Championships.

Rank	Nation	Gold	Silver	Bronze	Total
1	China	4	2	2	8
2	Russia	3	5	1	9
3	Georgia	2	0	4	6
4	Ukraine	1	0	3	4
5	Azerbaijan	0	1	0	1
5	India	0	1	0	1
5	Kazakhstan	0	1	0	1
8	France	0	0	1	1
Totals (8 entries)		10	10	11	31

== See also ==
- Chess Olympiad
- European Team Chess Championship
- Russia (USSR) vs Rest of the World
- Women's Chess Olympiad
- European Chess Club Cup
- World Chess Championship
- World Mind Sports Games
- Mind Sports Organisation
- Correspondence Chess Olympiad
