= Vladimir Petkov =

Bulgarian chess player

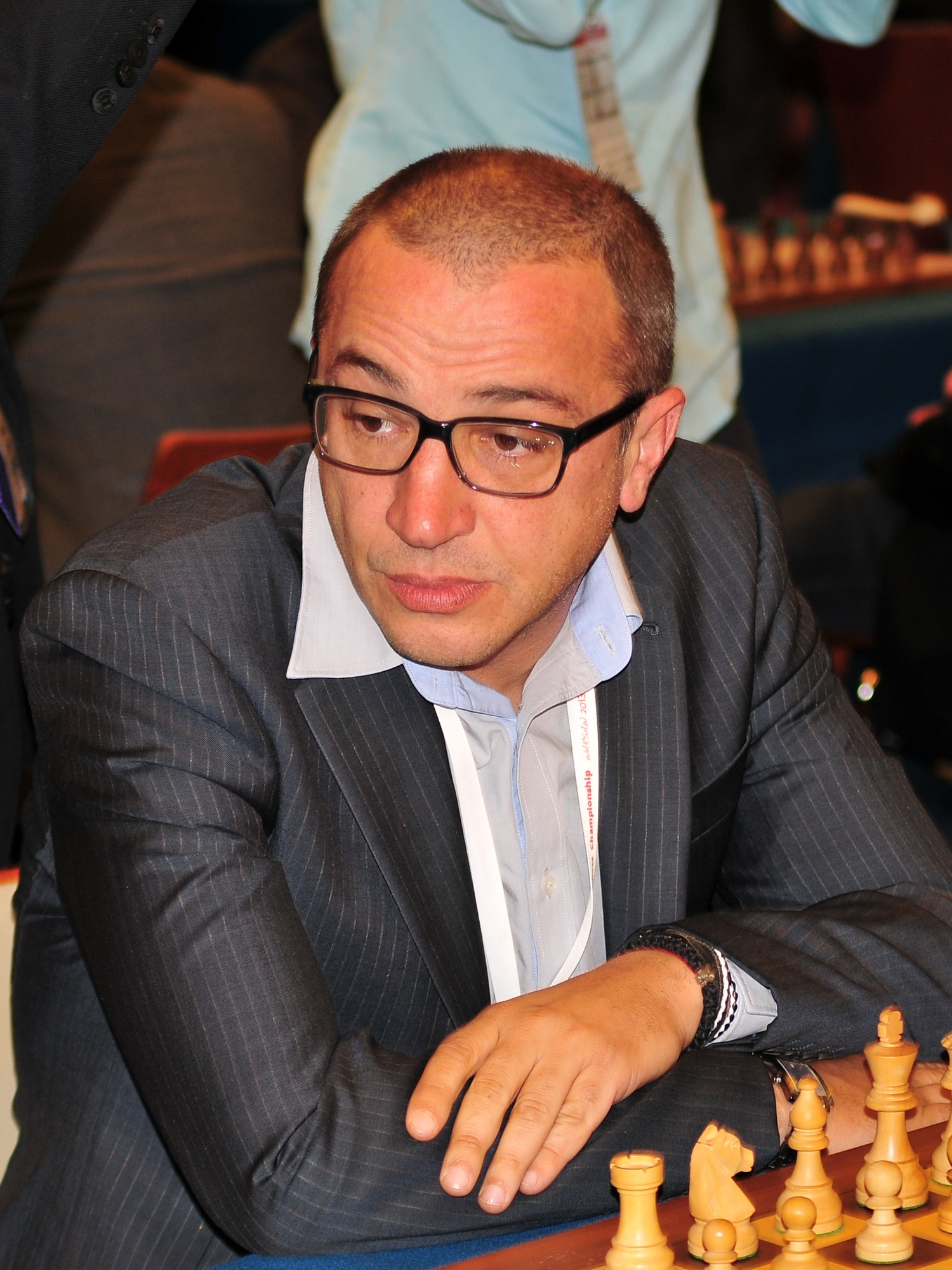
- Petkov in 2013

Personal information
- Born: 26 January 1971 (age 55) Vidin, Bulgaria

Chess career
- Country: Bulgaria
- Title: Grandmaster (2007)
- FIDE rating: 2414 (July 2026)
- Peak rating: 2573 (October 2013)

Vladimir Ivanov Petkov (Bulgarian: Владимир Иванов Петков; born 26 January 1971) is a Bulgarian chess grandmaster.

== Biography ==
Until 2003 Vladimir Petkov did not achieve significant successes on the international chess tournaments (possessed on October 1, 2003 his chess rating - 2343). Then in just two years he was promoted to the forefront of Bulgarian chess players. During this period Vladimir Petkov achieved a number of successes, including won in Aschach an der Donau (2004), Veliko Tarnovo (2005) and Zadar (2005), finished 4th in Bulgarian Chess Championship (Pleven, 2005). Also he finished 2nd in Ortigueira (2005), shared 2nd place in Marín (2005), shared 3rd place in La Pobla de Lillet (2005) and triumphed in Ferrol (2005). In 2006 Vladimir Petkov shared 2nd place in Ferrol. He also shared 1st place in Athens. In 2010, Vladimir Petkov won international chess tournament in Cesenatico. In 2014 he took the 1st place in Gabicce Mare and in Martigny.

Vladimir Petkov played for Bulgaria in the Chess Olympiad:

- In 2006, at first reserve board in the 37th Chess Olympiad in Turin (+1, =0, -2).

Vladimir Petkov played for Bulgaria in the European Team Chess Championship:

- In 2013, at third board in the 19th European Team Chess Championship in Warsaw (+2, =2, -4).

He was awarded the FIDE International Master (IM) title in 2004 and the FIDE Grandmaster (GM) title in 2007.
