= Angela Borsuk =

Israeli chess player (born 1967)

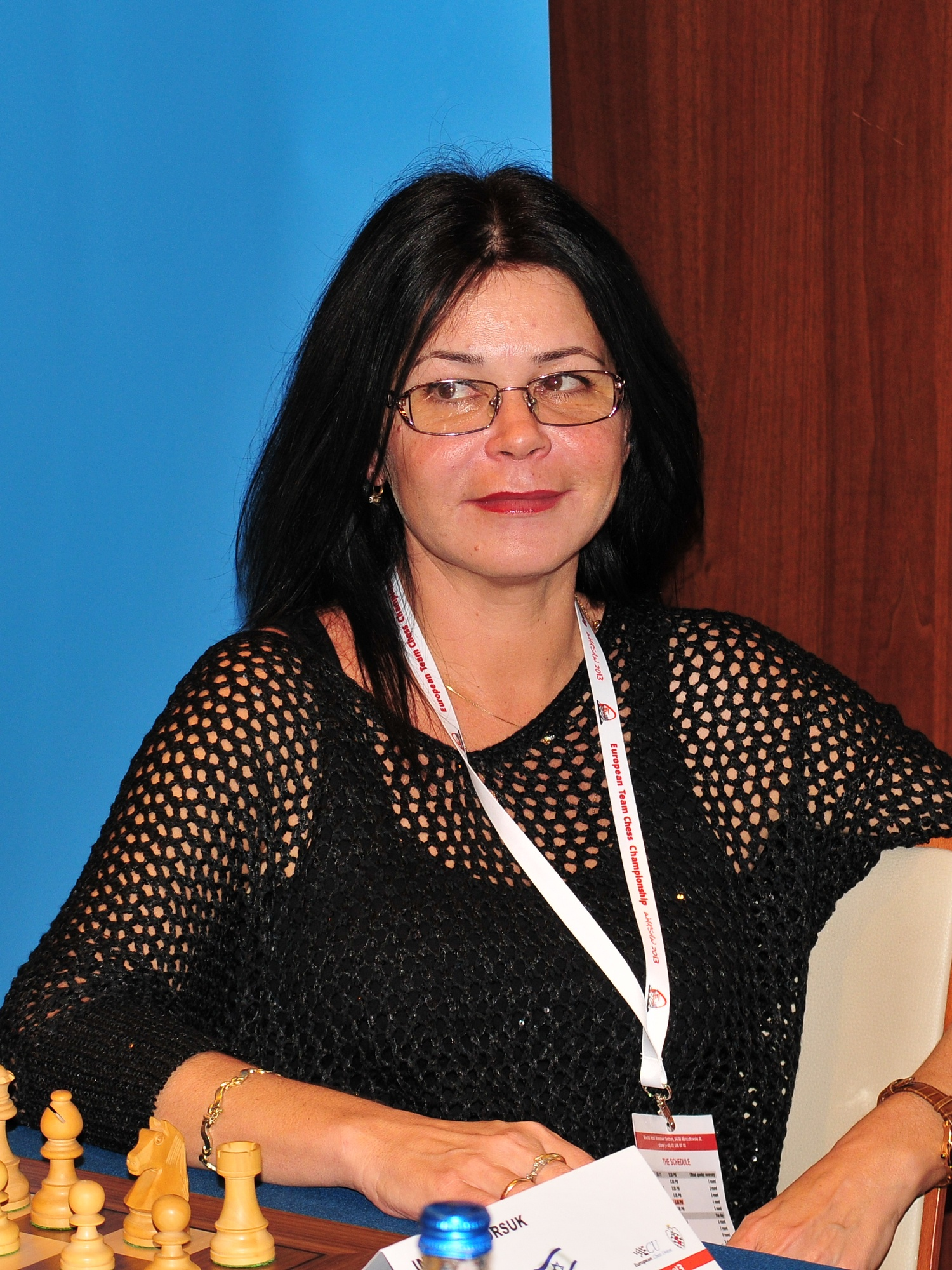

Personal information
- Native name: אנג'לה בורסוק
- Born: August 29, 1967 (age 59) Kherson, Ukrainian SSR, Soviet Union

Chess career
- Country: Soviet Union (until 1991); Ukraine (1992–2000); Israel (since 2000)
- Title: International Master (2008); Woman Grandmaster (1997)
- Peak rating: 2398 (October 2008)
- Peak ranking: 67th woman (October 2008)

Angela Mykhailivna Borsuk (Hebrew: אנג'לה בורסוק; Ukrainian: Анжела Борсук; born 29 August 1967) is an Israeli chess player. She previously represented Soviet Union and Ukraine. Borsuk was born in Kherson, Ukraine and made her chess debut for Ukraine in 1989. Borsuk has formally represented Israel for most number of times in her chess career.

Angela Borsuk made her Israeli debut for the Israeli national chess team at the European Chess Championship in 1999, and received there a silver medal for her individual score. She again participated for Israel at this tournament in 2005, 2007, 2009, 2011 and 2013.
