= Natalia Zdebskaya =

Ukrainian chess player (born 1986)

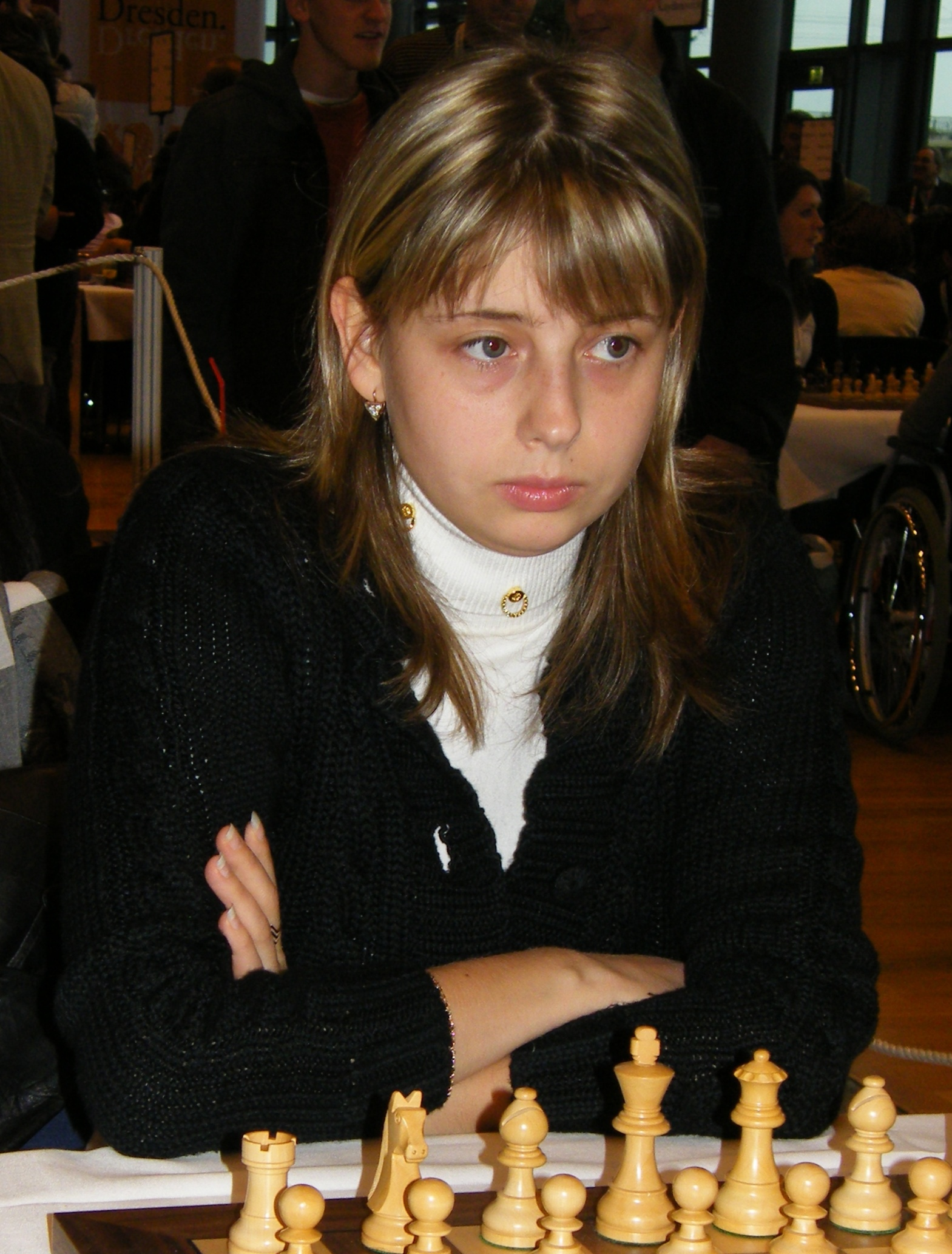
- Zdebskaya in 2008

Personal information
- Born: 16 August 1986 (age 39) Horlivka, Ukraine

Chess career
- Country: Ukraine
- Title: Woman Grandmaster (2004)
- FIDE rating: 2389 (September 2011)
- Peak rating: 2438 (April 2009)

Natalia Zdebskaya (Ukrainian: Наталiя Здебська, romanized: Nataliya Zdebska; born 16 August 1986) is a Ukrainian chess player who holds the title of Woman Grandmaster (WGM, 2004).

== Chess career ==
Zdebskaya repeatedly represented Ukraine at the European Youth Chess Championships and World Youth Chess Championships in different age groups, where she won three medals: silver (in 2003, at the World Youth Chess Championship in the U18 girls age group) and two bronze (in 2000, at the European Youth Chess Championship in the U14 girls age group, and in 2001, at the European Youth Chess Championship in the U16 girls age group).

She is winner of many international women's chess tournaments, including Sevastopol (2000), Kharkiv (2003), Lyudmila Rudenko memorial in Saint Petersburg (2005), Chișinău (2005), Elisaveta Bykova memorial in Vladimir (2006, 2007). She twice won medals in Ukrainian women's chess championships: silver (2005) and bronze (2006).

Zdebskaya played for Ukraine in the Women's Chess Olympiad:

- In 2008, at second board in the 38th Chess Olympiad (women) in Dresden (+6, =2, -0) and won team silver medal and individual gold medal.

She played for Ukraine in the European Team Chess Championship:

- In 2009, at reserve board in the 8th European Team Chess Championship (women) in Novi Sad (+1, =4, -2) and won team bronze medal.

Zdebskaya played for Ukraine in the World Team Chess Championship:

- In 2009, at reserve board in the 2nd Women's World Team Chess Championship 2009 in Ningbo (+2, =5, -0) and won team and individual bronze medals.

In 2002, she was awarded the FIDE Woman International Master (WIM) title and received the FIDE Woman Grandmaster (WGM) title two years later.

Since 2011, she rarely participated in chess tournaments.

== Personal life ==
She married Ukrainian chess grandmaster Yuri Drozdovskij in 2009.
