= Yuri Drozdovskij =

Ukrainian chess grandmaster (born 1984)

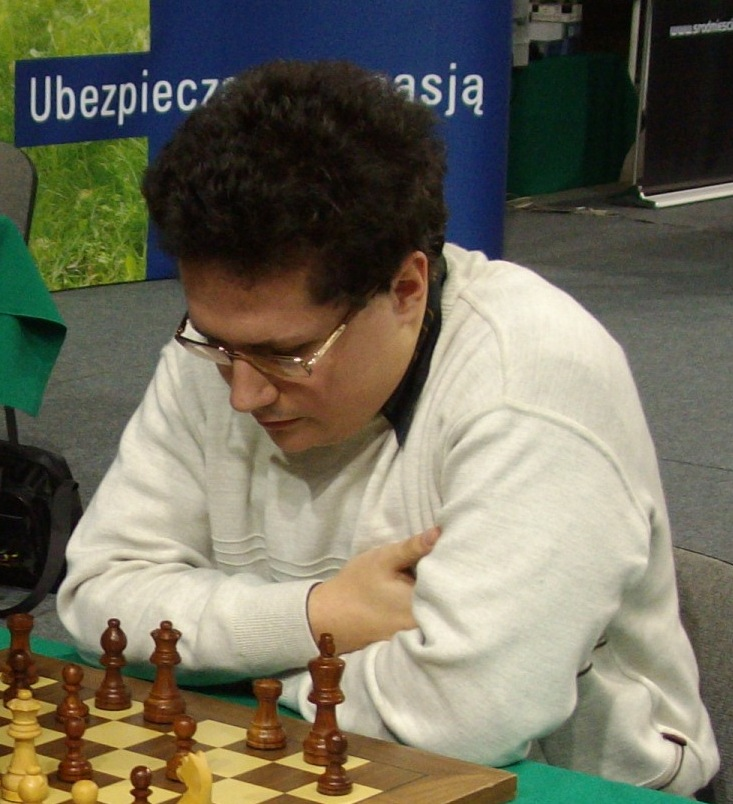

Personal information
- Born: Юрій Анатолійович Дроздовський; 22 May 1984 (age 42) Odesa, Ukrainian SSR, Soviet Union

Chess career
- Country: Ukraine
- Title: Grandmaster (2004)
- FIDE rating: 2616 (July 2026)
- Peak rating: 2627 (September 2009)

Yuri Anatolyevich Drozdovskij (Ukrainian: Юрій Дроздовський, romanized: Yuriy Drozdovskyi, born 22 May 1984 in Odesa) is a Ukrainian chess Grandmaster.

He won the European Rapid Championship in 2006 and tied for first place at Cappelle-la-Grande in 2007. Drozdovskij was equal first (losing out on tie-break to Pavel Tregubov) at the 4th Pivdenny Bank Cup 2008, a rapid tournament held annually in Odesa. This was an outstanding result, as he finished ahead of Boris Gelfand, Ruslan Ponomariov, Anatoly Karpov and Viktor Korchnoi. In 2009 he was a member of the bronze medal-winning Ukrainian team at the European Team Chess Championship.

His current Elo rating is 2614.

== Personal life ==
Since 2009 Yuri Drozdovskij is married to Ukrainian Woman Grandmaster Natalia Zdebskaya. In recent years, he put his professional chess career on hold in order to concentrate on his professional activities (banking).
