= Bianca de Jong-Muhren =

Dutch chess player (born 1986)

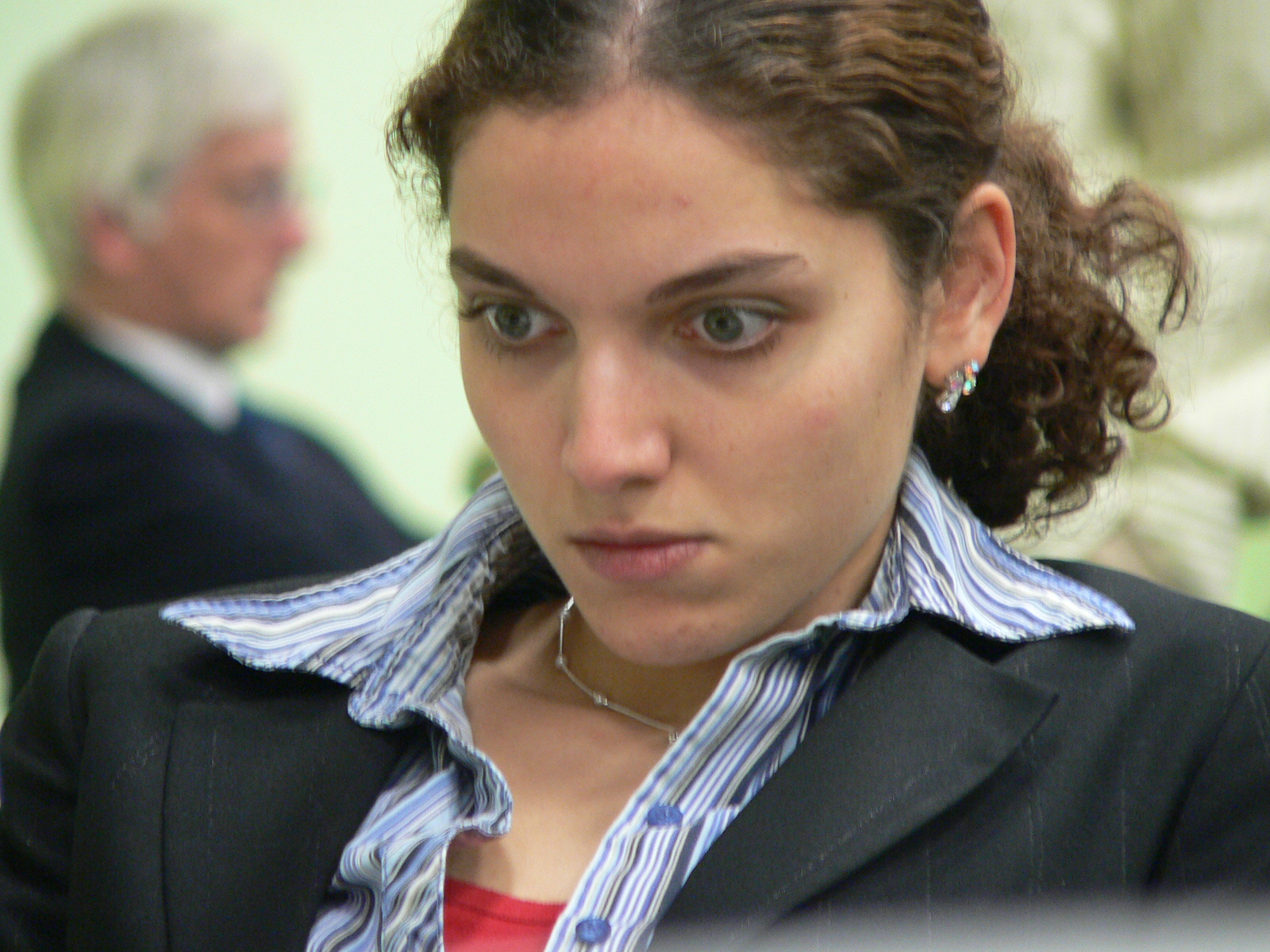
- Muhren in January 2005 (age 18)

Personal information
- Born: 28 February 1986 (age 40) Gouda, Netherlands

Chess career
- Country: Netherlands
- Title: Woman Grandmaster (2007)
- FIDE rating: 2252 (December 2022)
- Peak rating: 2365 (June 2015)

Bianca de Jong-Muhren (née Muhren; born 28 February 1986) is a Dutch chess player who holds the FIDE title of Woman Grandmaster (WGM, 2007). She is a four-time Dutch Women's Chess Championship medalist (2005, 2006, 2010, 2014).

== Biography ==
De Jong-Muhren has been playing chess since the age of five. Between 1994 and 2006 she repeatedly represented the Netherlands at the World and European Youth Chess Championships in all age groups. In 2004, in Ürgüp Bianca de Jong-Muhren won the title of runner-up in European Youth Chess Championship in U18 age group. She was also a multiple national champion of youth in 1996 (U12), 1998 (twice: U12 and U20), 2000 (U14), 2002 (U16) and 2003 (U20). Of these championship titles, gold in Leiden in 1998 in the U20 age group deserves special distinction, as she was only 12 when she won the competition.

She won the medals of the individual Dutch Women's Chess Championships four times: three silver (2006, 2010, 2014) and bronze (2005).

De Jong-Muhren played for Netherlands in the Women's Chess Olympiads:

- In 2004, at first reserve board in the 36th Chess Olympiad (women) in Calvià (+6, =1, -3),
- In 2006, at first reserve board in the 37th Chess Olympiad (women) in Turin (+5, =2, -2),
- In 2014, at fourth board in the 41st Chess Olympiad (women) in Tromsø (+4, =3, -2).

She played for Netherlands in the European Team Chess Championship:

- In 2005, at fourth board in the 6th European Team Chess Championship (women) in Gothenburg (+3, =1, -3),
- In 2007, at third board in the 7th European Team Chess Championship (women) in Heraklion (+2, =5, -1),
- In 2009, at fourth board in the 8th European Team Chess Championship (women) in Novi Sad (+3, =2, -3),
- In 2015, at third board in the 11th European Team Chess Championship (women) in Reykjavík (+1, =1, -3).

In 2004, she was awarded the Woman International Master (WIM) title and received the Woman Grandmaster (WGM) title three years later.
