= 37th Chess Olympiad =

2006 chess tournament in Turin, Italy

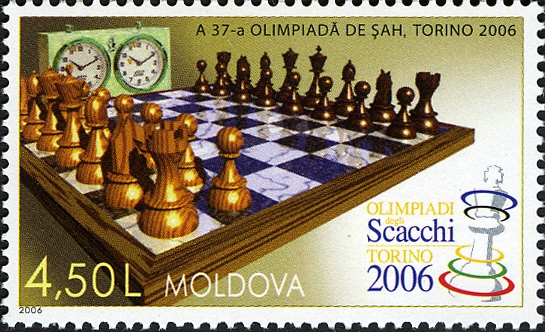
- A 2006 stamp of Moldova featuring the logo of the 37th Chess Olympiad
- Host city: Turin
- Country: Italy
- Nations: 143 (Open); 99 (Women)
- Teams: 148 (Open); 103 (Women)
- Athletes: 1,307
- Dates: 20 May – 4 June 2006

Medalists

Team (Open)
- 1st place, gold medalist(s): Armenia
- 2nd place, silver medalist(s): China
- 3rd place, bronze medalist(s): United States

Team (Women)
- 1st place, gold medalist(s): Ukraine
- 2nd place, silver medalist(s): Russia
- 3rd place, bronze medalist(s): China

Individual (Open)
- (Russia) Vladimir Kramnik

Individual (Women)
- (China) Zhao Xue

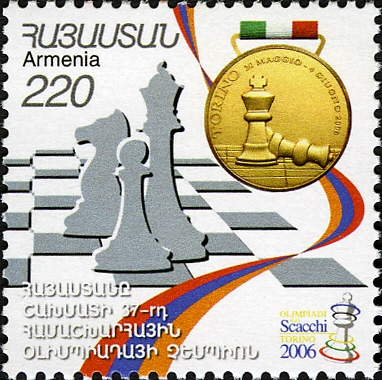
A 2007 stamp of Armenia dedicated to the 37th Chess Olympiad

The 37th Chess Olympiad (Italian: Le 37° Olimpiadi degli scacchi), organized by FIDE and comprising an open and a women's tournament, as well as several other events designed to promote the game of chess, took place between May 20 and June 4, 2006, in Turin, Italy. There were 148 teams in the open event and 103 in the women's event. In total, 1307 players were registered.

Both tournament sections were officiated by international arbiter Geurt Gijssen (Netherlands). Teams were paired across the 13 rounds of competition according to the Swiss system. The open division was played over four boards per round, while the women's was played over three. In the event of a draw, the tie-break was decided by 1. The Buchholz system; 2. Match points; 3. The Sonneborn-Berger system; and 4. The Median Buchholz system.

The time control for each game permitted each player 90 minutes for all their moves, with an additional 30 seconds increment for each player after each move, beginning with the first.

== Open event ==
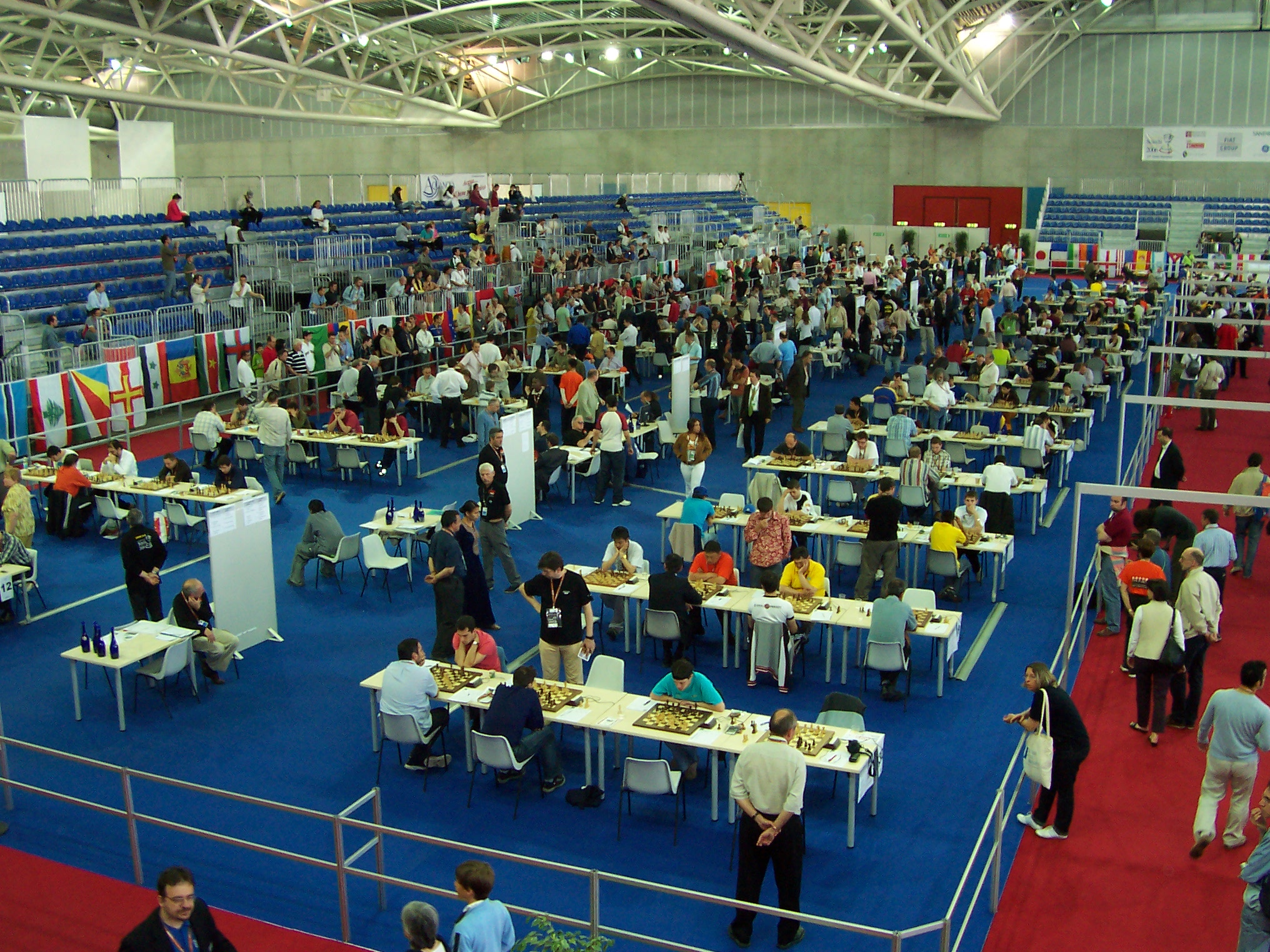
The tournament venue: The Oval Lingotto

The open division was contested by 148 teams representing 143 nations. Italy, as hosts, fielded three teams. At the same time the International Braille Chess Association (IBCA), the International Physically Disabled Chess Association (IPCA), and the International Committee of Silent Chess (ICSC) each provided one squad. Somalia and Sierra Leone were signed up, but never arrived.

Led by first board Levon Aronian, the second highest-rated player at the Olympiad, and first reserve Gabriel Sargissian, who scored 10 points in 11 games, Armenia improved on their third-place performance at the 36th Olympiad, claiming their first ever gold medals by a full two points over the silver medallists China, whose fourth board Wang Yue went undefeated, winning eight games and drawing four. Armenia ended the tournament without having lost a match, winning 10 and drawing three, including in the final round against Hungary, when four draws were cursorily recorded. Aronian was the only Armenian player to lose a game during the tournament, falling in the fifth round to Vladimir Kramnik of Russia.

Reigning classical World Champion Kramnik, playing internationally for the first time in six months, scored 6½ points in his nine games, recording the best rating performance of any player. His Russian team, though, did not perform as expected; fielding six of the tournament's 17 strongest players on rating, Russia held second place, just behind Armenia, through the seventh round but lost matches to France (1½-2½), the United States (1½-2½), and, in the final round, Israel (1-3), and ultimately finished sixth; the worst Olympic result ever for a Soviet or Russian side.

Although they defeated the United States (2½-1½) in the penultimate round, Israel had to settle for a tie for third place; the Americans claimed the bronze medals on Buchholz tiebreaks. Hungary, seeded 16th, finished fifth, thanks to strong performances from third board Ferenc Berkes and fourth board Csaba Balogh, while India, who entered the tournament seeded second, finished in 30th place, with first board Viswanathan Anand (former and future World Champion) and fourth board Surya Shekhar Ganguly both scoring just 50%. Even without FIDE World Champion Veselin Topalov, Bulgaria still managed to clinch a top ten result, finishing in ninth place.

Open event
#	Country	Players	Average rating	Points	Buchholz
1	Armenia	Aronian, Akopian, Asrian, Lputian, Sargissian, Minasian	2682	36	
2	China	Bu Xiangzhi, Zhang Zhong, Zhang Pengxiang, Wang Yue, Ni Hua, Zhao Jun	2628	34	
3	United States	Kamsky, Onischuk, Nakamura, Ibragimov, Kaidanov, Akobian	2656	33	392.5
4	Israel	Gelfand, Smirin, Sutovsky, Avrukh, Huzman, Mikhalevski	2663	33	380.5
5	Hungary	Almási, Gyimesi, Berkes, Balogh, Ruck, Horváth	2610	32½	
6	Russia	Kramnik, Svidler, Grischuk, Morozevich, Bareev, Rublevsky	2730	32	410.5
7	France	Bacrot, Lautier, Sokolov, Fressinet, Vachier-Lagrave, Bauer	2665	32	396.0
8	Ukraine	Ivanchuk, Volokitin, Karjakin, Eljanov, Moiseenko, Efimenko	2680	32	390.5
9	Bulgaria	Georgiev, Cheparinov, Delchev, Spasov, Petkov, Iotov	2633	32	385.0
10	Spain	Shirov, Vallejo Pons, Illescas Córdoba, Arizmendi Martinez, San Segundo Carrillo, Narciso Dublan	2628	32	377.5

Final Ranking - Open
#	Country	Average rating	Points	Buchholz	MP
11	Czech Republic	2596	31	399.0	
12	Netherlands	2646	31	396.0	
13	Uzbekistan	2554	31	389.5	
14	Georgia	2610	31	388.0	
15	Germany	2621	31	381.0	
16	Cuba	2598	30½	386.0	
17	Sweden	2549	30½	381.0	
18	Moldova	2578	30½	376.5	
19	England	2627	30½	366.0	
20	Denmark	2577	30	396.0	
21	Poland	2593	30	381.0	
22	Greece	2582	30	379.0	
23	Slovenia	2547	30	378.5	
24	Azerbaijan	2643	30	377.5	
25	Croatia	2559	30	373.5	
26	Romania	2610	30	372.0	
27	Switzerland	2555	30	367.5	
28	Latvia	2516	30	357.5	
29	Australia	2479	30	351.0	
30	India	2688	29½	391.5	
31	Norway	2577	29½	376.0	
32	Brazil	2573	29½	371.5	
33	North Macedonia	2517	29½	366.0	
34	Canada	2482	29½	357.0	
35	Italy	2493	29½	354.5	
36	Belarus	2598	29	381.0	
37	Serbia and Montenegro	2542	29	376.0	
38	Turkey	2540	29	372.5	
39	Vietnam	2533	29	372.0	
40	Indonesia	2489	29	369.5	
41	Bosnia and Herzegovina	2521	29	367.5	
42	Lithuania	2530	29	360.5	
43	Slovakia	2536	28½	373.5	
44	Philippines	2538	28½	369.5	
45	Iceland	2560	28½	368.0	
46	Estonia	2487	28½	355.0	
47	Mexico	2449	28½	354.0	
48	Italy "B"	2375	28½	353.5	
49	Iran	2472	28	375.5	
50	Portugal	2481	28	362.5	
51	Argentina	2532	28	361.5	
52	Scotland	2479	28	358.0	
53	Kazakhstan	2348	28	345.5	
54	Tajikistan	2165	28	331.0	
55	Qatar	2472	27½	354.0	
56	Ireland	2455	27½	352.0	
57	Colombia	2437	27	362.5	
58	Egypt	2448	27	360.0	
59	Mongolia	2332	27	358.5	
60	Bangladesh	2493	27	352.0	
61	Albania	2439	27	351.5	14
62	Finland	2466	27	351.5	12
63	Dominican Republic	2314	27	351.0	
64	Venezuela	2342	27	349.0	
65	Chile	2438	27	340.5	
66	United Arab Emirates	2327	27	324.0	
67	Paraguay	2420	26½	354.5	
68	Morocco	2348	26½	353.5	
69	Algeria	2291	26½	347.0	
70	Belgium	2438	26½	342.0	
71	Bolivia	2336	26½	327.5	
72	Costa Rica	2362	26½	324.0	
73	Peru	2404	26	362.5	
74	Ecuador	2439	26	349.5	
75	Turkmenistan	2444	26	348.0	
76	ICSC	2308	26	333.5	
77	Austria	2410	26	332.5	
78	Singapore	2388	26	330.5	
79	Puerto Rico	2237	26	320.5	
80	Malaysia	2331	25½	364.5	
81	Luxembourg	2424	25½	350.5	
82	Faroe Islands	2333	25½	345.0	
83	Italy "C"	2366	25½	337.5	
84	South Africa	2321	25½	334.5	
85	Nicaragua	2315	25½	329.0	
86	Iraq	2310	25½	326.0	
87	Andorra	2400	25½	316.5	
88	Japan	2139	25½	314.5	
89	Kyrgyzstan	2332	25	347.0	
90	Tunisia	2383	25	341.0	
91	Wales	2284	25	333.5	
92	New Zealand	2335	24½	342.5	
93	Nigeria	2275	24½	341.5	
94	Syria	2329	24½	338.5	
95	El Salvador	2279	24½	334.0	
96	Lebanon	2255	24½	325.0	
97	Uruguay	2248	24½	320.5	
98	Barbados	2268	24½	319.0	
99	Pakistan	2074	24½	206.5	
100	Thailand	2274	24	333.0	
101	Trinidad and Tobago	2217	24	314.5	
102	Nepal	2191	24	312.0	
103	Botswana	2212	24	305.0	
104	Cyprus	2126	24	297.0	
105	Jamaica	2227	23½	329.0	
106	Angola	2257	23½	328.0	
107	IPCA	2339	23½	322.0	
108	Malta	2187	23½	304.0	
109	Sudan	1968	23½	299.5	
110	Zambia	2052	23½	222.5	
111	IBCA	2339	23	322.0	
112	Libya	2052	23	304.0	
113	Uganda	2172	23	303.5	
114	Panama	2199	23	303.0	
115	Netherlands Antilles	2079	23	273.5	
116	Yemen	2276	22½	325.0	
117	Guatemala	2245	22½	320.5	
118	Sri Lanka	2181	22½	303.5	
119	Brunei	2244	22½	291.0	
120	Bahrain	2115	22	307.5	
121	Liechtenstein	2152	22	301.5	
122	Hong Kong	2175	22	300.5	
123	Kenya	2112	22	279.0	
124	Jersey	2120	22	274.5	
125	Palestine	2188	21½	297.0	
126	Haiti	1400	21½	295.5	
127	Monaco	2165	21½	291.5	
128	Ethiopia	1587	21½	289.5	
129	San Marino	2089	21½	288.5	
130	Suriname	2187	21½	270.0	
131	Mozambique	1576	21	296.5	
132	Namibia	2147	21	292.5	
133	Honduras	2140	21	289.0	
134	Seychelles	1771	21	286.0	
135	Macau	2117	21	281.0	
136	Chinese Taipei	1572	21	259.5	
137	Afghanistan	1707	20½	297.0	
138	Mauritania	2194	20½	290.5	
139	Guernsey	2017	20	280.0	
140	Fiji	1793	20	259.0	
141	Malawi	1400	19½	277.5	
142	Papua New Guinea	1766	19½	263.0	
143	South Korea	1910	19	288.0	
144	Bermuda	1967	19	268.5	
145	Aruba	2017	18		
146	British Virgin Islands	1986	15½		
147	Rwanda	1470	12		
148	United States Virgin Islands	1753	10½		

=== Group prizes ===
In addition to the overall medals, prizes were given out to the best teams in five different seeding groups—in other words, the teams who exceeded their seeding the most. Overall medal winners were not eligible for group prizes.

Group Prizes
Group	Seeding range	Team	Seed	Overall finish
A	1–30	Israel	6	4
B	31–60	Sweden	31	17
C	61–89	Italy "B"	70	48
D	90–120	Tajikistan	106	54
E	121–147	Japan	121	87

=== Individual medals ===
- Performance rating: (Russia) Vladimir Kramnik 2847
- Board 1: (Pakistan) Tunveer Mohyuddin Gillani 7 / 8 = 87.5%
- Board 2: (Andorra) Josep Oms Pallise 9 / 11 = 81.8%
- Board 3: (Uruguay) Gustavo Manuel Larrea Llorca 7 / 8 = 87.5%
- Board 4: (China) Wang Yue 10 / 12 = 83.3%
- 1st reserve: (Yemen) Basheer Al Qudaimi 7 / 7 = 100.0%
- 2nd reserve: (Zambia) Richmond Phiri 6½ / 7 = 92.9%

== Women's event ==
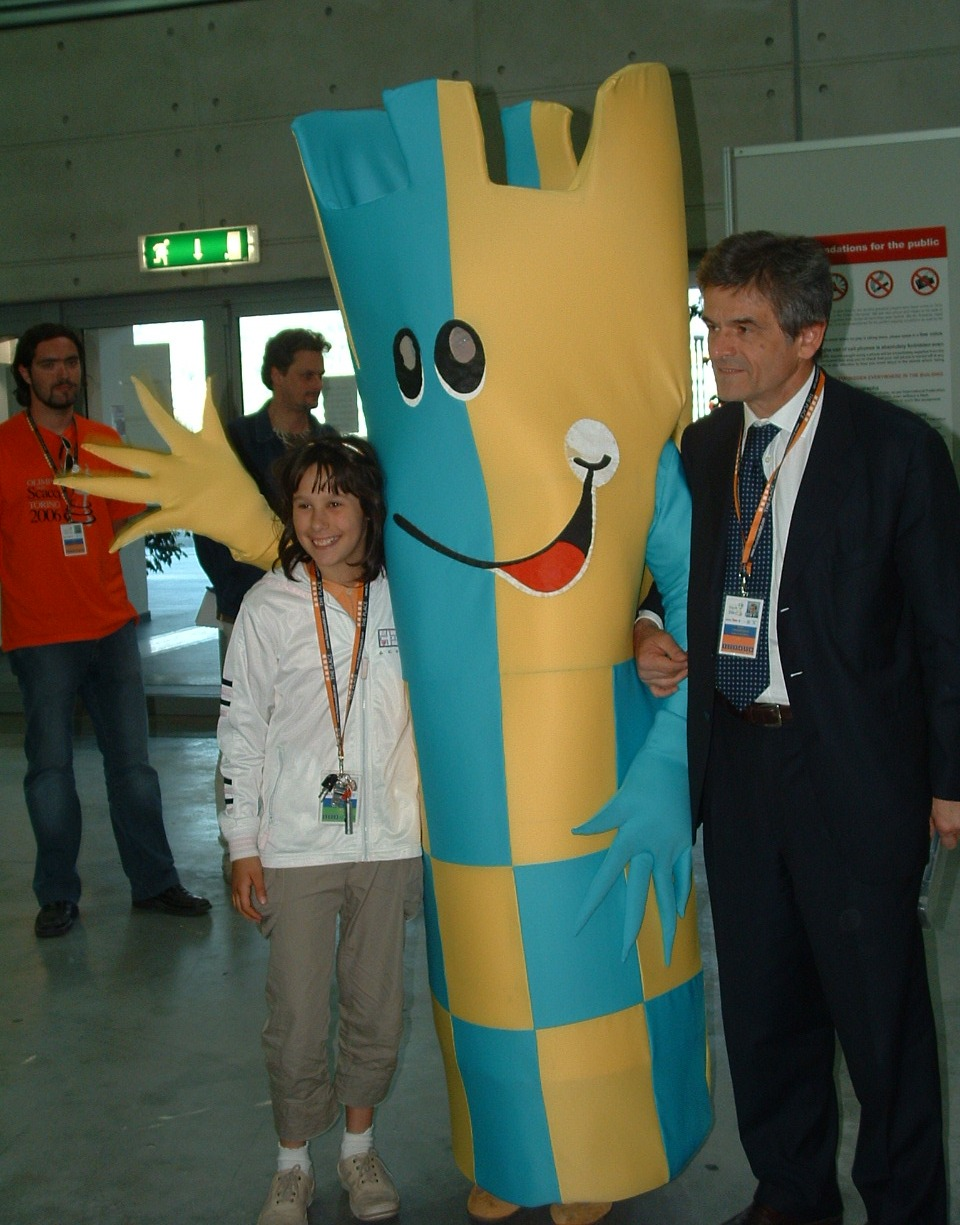
Italy's Marina Brunello (12), with Olympiad mascot Ruki and Turin Mayor Sergio Chiamparino

The women's division was contested by 103 teams representing 99 nations. Italy, as hosts, fielded two teams, whilst the International Braille Chess Association (IBCA) and the International Physically Disabled Chess Association (IPCA) each provided one squad. Somalia and Sudan had registered but never showed up. Afghanistan, Uganda, and Rwanda all withdrew after forfeiting their first round matches.

Ukraine had finished in 18th place at the previous Olympiad but entered the tournament seeded second. They trailed top-seeds Russia half a point through the seventh round, despite having taken defeated the Russians in the fifth round (2-1), but took the lead in round eight, defeating Hungary while Russia managed only to draw their match with the United States. Ukraine never gave up their lead for the remainder of the tournament and all but secured the gold medals and the Vera Menchik Trophy with a twelfth round win over India (2½-½), eventually finishing 1½ points ahead of silver medallists Russia. The Ukrainian team was led by Natalia Zhukova, who scored 7½ points in her nine games, defeating the top- and second-rated players, Humpy Koneru of India and Alexandra Kosteniuk of Russia. Third board Inna Gaponenko won six games, drew two, and lost only one.

Defending champions China were missing newly crowned World Champion Xu Yuhua, but still claimed the bronze medals by three points over the United States with whom they drew in the penultimate round Their third-place finish was in no small part due to top board Zhao Xue, who entered the tournament seeded 22nd yet, having played in every round, went through the Olympiad undefeated, conceding only six draws in her 13 games.

The American team took fourth place on tiebreaks, just ahead of Hungary, Georgia, and the Netherlands - the Dutch team being seeded only 18th.

#	Country	Players	Average rating	Points	Buchholz
1	Ukraine	Zhukova, Lahno, Yanovska-Gaponenko, Ushenina	2441	29½	
2	Russia	Kosteniuk, T. Kosintseva, N. Kosintseva, Kovalevskaya	2499	28	
3	China	Zhao Xue, Wang Yu, Shen Yang, Hou Yifan	2408	27½	
4	United States	Zatonskih, Krush, Goletiani, Baginskaite	2414	24½	307.0
5	Hungary	Hoang Thanh Trang, Mádl, Vajda, Gara	2426	24½	306.0
6	Georgia	Khurtsidze, Dzagnidze, Javakhishvili, Lomineishvili	2430	24½	305.5
7	Netherlands	Peng Zhaoqin, Bosboom-Lanchava, Schuurman, Muhren	2344	24½	276.5
8	Armenia	Mkrtchian, Danielian, Aginian, Andriasian	2402	24	299.0
9	Slovenia	A. Muzychuk, Srebrnič, Krivec, Novak	2348	24	286.0
10	Czech Republic	Jacková, Čedíková, Sikorová, Blažková	2302	24	270.5

Final Ranking - Women
#	Country	Average rating	Points	Buchholz	MP	S-B
11	Germany	2399	23½			
12	India	2389	23	305.0		
13	Bulgaria	2378	23	302.0		
14	Romania	2375	23	294.0		
15	Vietnam	2302	23	283.5		
16	Cuba	2289	23	279.0		
17	Latvia	2292	23	263.0		
18	France	2366	22½	299.5		
19	Greece	2370	22½	297.0		
20	Poland	2375	22½	293.0		
21	Belarus	2262	22½	293.0		
22	Slovakia	2354	22½	292.0		
23	Lithuania	2374	22	286.5		
24	Turkey	2189	22	273.0		
25	Serbia and Montenegro	2343	22	272.5		
26	Philippines	2083	22	271.5		
27	Iran	2222	22	271.0		
28	Spain	2296	21½	286.0		
29	Israel	2329	21½	281.5		
30	Croatia	2227	21½	281.0		
31	Sweden	2191	21½	260.0		
32	Uzbekistan	2200	21½	257.0		
33	Estonia	2246	21	285.5		
34	Mongolia	2264	21	282.5		
35	Argentina	2265	21	273.5		
36	Turkmenistan	2182	21	266.5		
37	Italy	2304	21	266.0		
38	Switzerland	2262	21	265.5		
39	Moldova	2262	21	262.5		
40	Indonesia	1919	21	257.5		
41	Canada	2132	21	252.5		
42	England	2231	20½	271.5		
43	Venezuela	1874	20½	264.5		
44	Malaysia	2089	20½	259.5		
45	Kazakhstan	2262	20	283.5		
46	Ecuador	2269	20	280.0		
47	Portugal	2117	20	258.0		
48	Colombia	2137	20	256.0		
49	El Salvador	2058	20	254.0		
50	Iceland	2111	20	249.0		
51	Azerbaijan	2123	20	244.0		
52	Brazil	2081	20	238.0		
53	Mexico	2137	19½	250.0		
54	Australia	2210	19½	256.0		
55	Denmark	2085	19½	254.5		
56	Finland	2134	19½	247.5		
57	Bosnia and Herzegovina	2165	19	260.0		
58	Austria	2092	19	259.0		
59	Norway	2182	19	258.5		
60	Peru	2136	19	255.0		
61	Kyrgyzstan	2137	19	254.0		
62	Luxembourg	1812	19	241.5		
63	Bolivia	1802	19	223.0		
64	North Macedonia	2137	18½	252.5		
65	Italy "B"	1945	18½	242.0		
66	South Africa	1900	18½	236.5		
67	IPCA	2056	18½	229.5		
68	Bangladesh	2090	18	260.5		
69	Albania	2054	18	248.5		
70	Dominican Republic	2079	18	239.5		
71	Guatemala	2030	18	236.0		
72	IBCA	2113	17½	248.0		
73	Scotland	1834	17½	240.0		
74	Tajikistan	1629	17½	236.0		
75	Wales	1947	17½	234.5		
76	Jamaica	1791	17½	232.0	10	82.75
77	Sri Lanka	1863	17½	232.0	10	80.50
78	Ireland	1747	17½	231.5		
79	Algeria	1588	17½	227.5		
80	New Zealand	1692	17½	226.0		
81	Iraq	1805	17	247.0		
82	Nigeria	1590	17	233.0		
83	Costa Rica	1617	17	209.0		
84	Botswana	1584	16½	231.5		
85	Japan	1581	16½	211.5		
86	Malta	1400	16½	198.0		
87	ICSC	2008	16	234.0		
88	Puerto Rico	1826	16	233.5		
89	United Arab Emirates	1853	16	211.0		
90	Panama	1400	15½			
91	Chinese Taipei	1400	15	193.5		
92	Qatar	1400	15	182.5		
93	Suriname	1400	14½	184.5		
94	Kenya	1469	14½	182.0		
95	Fiji	1400	14	205.5		
96	Angola	1400	14	192.0		
97	Yemen	1400	14	179.5		
98	Trinidad and Tobago	1400	13½	176.0		
99	Libya	1467	13½	174.5		
100	Namibia	1400	13			
101	Netherlands Antilles	1400	12½			
102	United States Virgin Islands	1400	12			
103	Honduras	1400	9			

=== Group prizes ===
In addition to the overall medals, prizes were given out to the best teams in five different seeding groups—in other words, the teams who exceeded their seeding the most. Overall medal winners were not eligible for group prizes.

Group Prizes
Group	Seeding range	Team	Seed	Overall finish
A	1–20	United States	5	4
B	21–42	Czech Republic	22	10
C	43–64	Philippines	60	26
D	65–86	Indonesia	68	40
E	87–103	Algeria	87	79

=== Individual medals ===
- Performance rating: (China) Zhao Xue 2617
- Board 1: Lubov Zsiltzova-Lisenko (IBCA) 9 / 10 = 90.0%
- Board 2: (Luxembourg) Fiona Steil-Antoni 10 / 12 = 83.3%
- Board 3: (United Arab Emirates) Nora Mohd Saleh 7 / 8 = 87.5%
- Reserve: (Belarus) Tatiana Berlin 7 / 8 = 87.5%

== Overall title ==
The Nona Gaprindashvili Trophy is awarded to the nation that has the highest total number of game points in the open and women's divisions combined. Where two or more teams are tied, they are ordered by best single finish in either division and then by total number of points scored.

The trophy, named after the former women's World Champion (1961–78), was created by FIDE in 1997.

#	Team	Open division	Women's division	Total
1	China	34	27½	61½
2	Ukraine	32	29½	61½
3	Armenia	36	24	60

== Participating teams ==
Squads representing 133 nations, three international organizations, three constituent countries, two autonomous entities, two crown dependencies, two special administrative regions, two insular areas, and one associated state were entered into the Olympiad, comprising a total of 1307 registered players (some of which did not play).

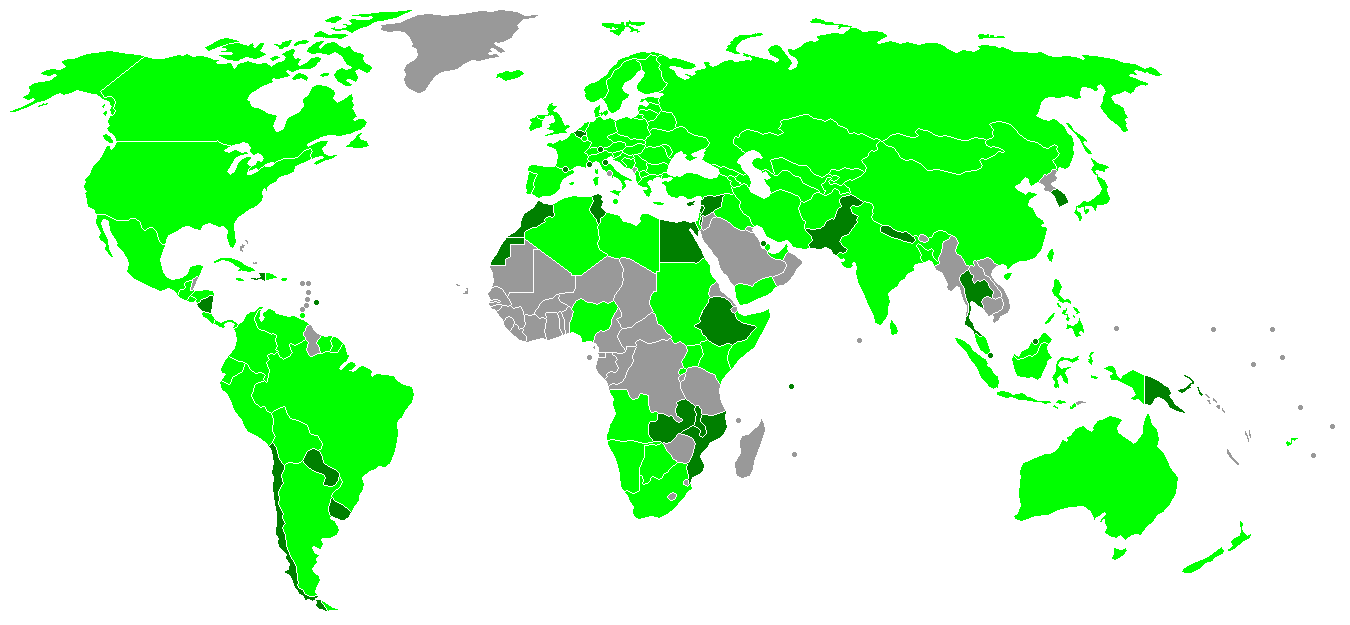
Countries that participated only in the open division are shown in dark green, while the rest of the participants are shown in light green.

== FIDE Congress ==
Concurrent with the chess competition, the 77th FIDE Congress was held in Turin, where delegates from all the national chess federations met to transact business. Incumbent FIDE president Kirsan Ilyumzhinov faced criticisms for alleged mismanagement and corruption, primarily from Western federations, including those of the United States, England, France, and Canada, but, with the support of most Asian and African delegates, notably those representing Russia and Singapore, he staved off a challenge from Dutch businessman Bessel Kok to retain his position through 2010, winning by 96 votes to Kok's 54.

The general assembly also awarded the 38th Chess Olympiad, to be held in 2010, to Khanty-Mansiysk, Russia, the site of the Chess World Cup 2005 and one of five candidates that had submitted bids. The city led after every round of the runoff voting, eventually beating Budva, Montenegro by 71–64.

== Associated events ==
Held in conjunction with the Olympiad, though not officially sponsored by FIDE, were two computer chess events: the 14th World Computer Chess Championship, played at classical time controls, and the 14th World Computer Speed Chess Championship. The computer Junior won its fifth championship and third in five years in the slower event, while newcomer Ikarus defeated quadruple defending champion Shredder to win the blitz event.
