= European Team Chess Championship =

International team chess event

The European Team Championship (often abbreviated in texts and games databases as ETC) is an international team chess event, eligible for the participation of European nations whose chess federations are located in zones 1.1 to 1.9. This more or less accords with the wider definition of Europe used in other events such as the Eurovision Song Contest and includes Israel, Russia and the former Soviet States. The competition is run under the auspices of the European Chess Union (ECU).

== Championship history ==
The idea was conceived in the early 1950s, when chess organisers became aware of the need for another international team event. Consequently, a Championship was devised and held every four years, with the intention of filling in the gaps between Olympiads. More recently, the Championship has grown in importance and popularity and is regarded as a prestigious tournament in its own right.

The first Championship Final was held in Vienna and Baden bei Wien in 1957 (August 22–28). It was a double round robin and notable for the surprise victory of the Yugoslav team over the Soviet team in their second encounter.

For the next twenty years, Championships occurred at four-year intervals, although the Kapfenberg event was delayed by a year. Since 1977, successive tournaments have mainly been held on a three and then a two-year cycle. A separate Women's Championship, following the same cycle and venues as the open Chmapionship, was established at Debrecen in 1992.

== Championship format ==
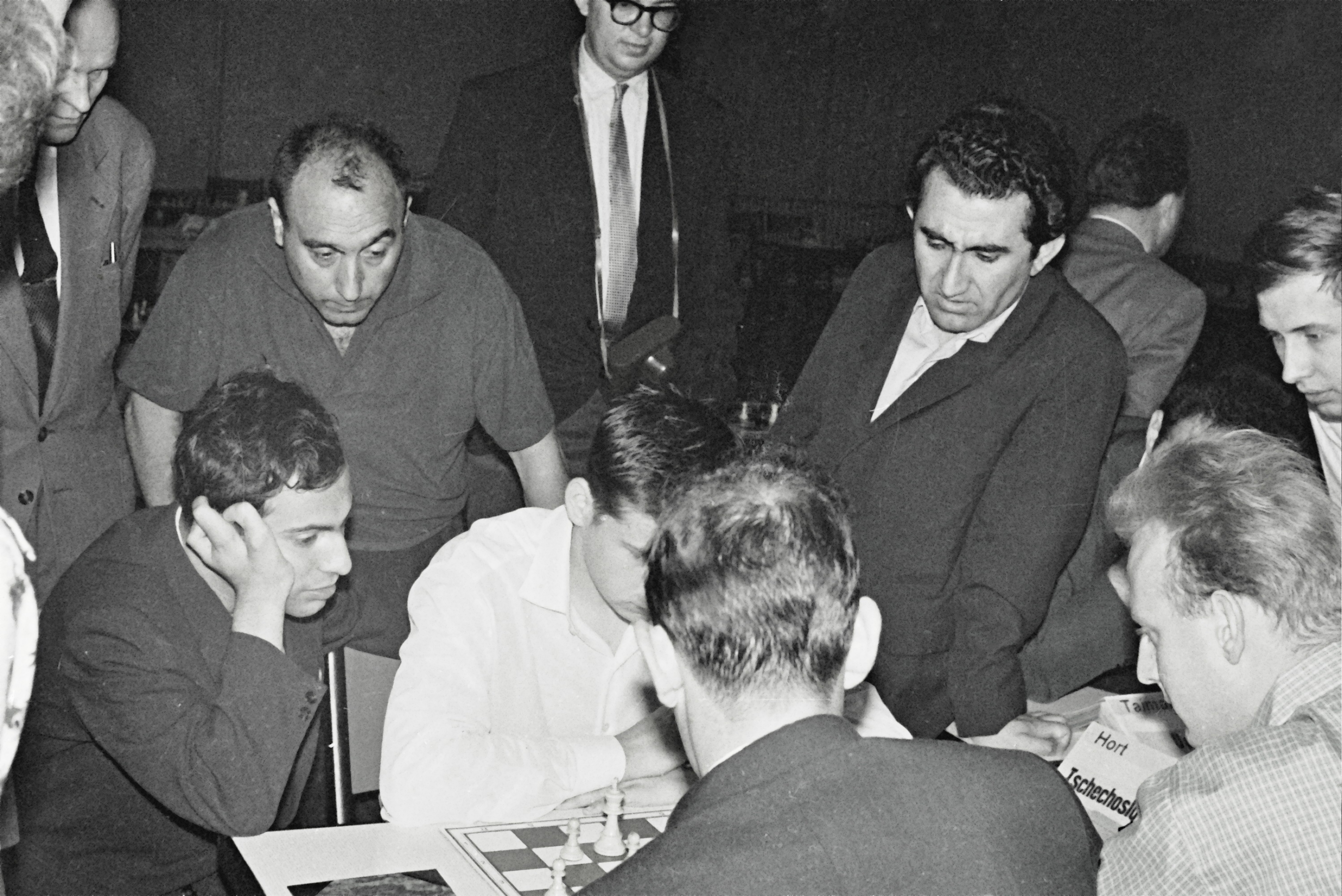
Oberhausen 1961: former world champion Mikhail Tal (seated left) and future world champion Tigran Petrosian (standing right) follow events

Over the early years, the formula altered incrementally, to allow the participation of a growing number of teams. At the inaugural event, only four places were made available for the Finals and some teams expected to do well, simply failed to qualify from the preliminary rounds. By 1973, the competition had expanded to roughly double the size and there were twenty-four nations in the preliminaries, competing for eight places in the Finals, held in Bath. Conversely, over the same period, the number of boards played in a match was reduced from ten to eight, presumably to reduce costs for organisers and participatory federations.

Into the new millennium, the format has changed radically and is now based on a Swiss system in nine rounds, on the model of the Olympiad, with one section for the open teams and one section for the women's teams, considered as separate competitions. At Gothenburg in 2005, the open competition comprised 40 teams (including Sweden B and Sweden C) and the women's competition, 26 teams (including Sweden B). Each round was contested over four boards and squads included a reserve.

Historically, teams played for the pleasure of winning the Europa Cup, but nowadays this has been overshadowed by the popular medal-winning format of the 'Olympics' and Chess Olympiad. Gold, silver and bronze medals are awarded to the top three teams and also as board prizes for outstanding individual performances.

Plovdiv 2003 heralded a major change in the scoring methodology. Both the open and women's events were, for the first time, scored by total of match points, rather than game points as had previously been the case. Game points are still recorded for purposes of tie-breaking.

== Results ==
=== Open section ===
Year	Location	Gold	Silver	Bronze
1957	(Austria) Vienna	USSR; Paul Keres; David Bronstein; Mikhail Tal; Boris Spassky; Tigran Petrosian; Vasily Smyslov; Mark Taimanov; Viktor Korchnoi; Alexander Tolush; Isaac Boleslavsky; Yuri Averbakh; Lev Aronin	Yugoslavia; Svetozar Gligorić; Aleksandar Matanović; Borislav Ivkov; Petar Trifunović; Andrija Fuderer; Nikola Karaklajić; Srećko Nedeljković; Borislav Milić; Mario Bertok; Braslav Rabar; Božidar Đurašević; Tomislav Rakić	Czechoslovakia; Miroslav Filip; Luděk Pachman; Ladislav Alster; František Zíta; Július Kozma; Ján Šefc; Jiří Fichtl; František Pithart; Josef Rejfíř; Jaroslav Ježek; František Blatný; Maximilián Ujtelky
1961	(West Germany) Oberhausen	USSR; Mikhail Botvinnik; Mikhail Tal; Paul Keres; Tigran Petrosian; Vasily Smyslov; Viktor Korchnoi; Efim Geller; Mark Taimanov; Lev Polugaevsky; Semyon Furman; Alexander Tolush; Vladimir Bagirov	Yugoslavia; Svetozar Gligorić; Petar Trifunović; Aleksandar Matanović; Mario Bertok; Milan Matulović; Mijo Udovčić; Dragoljub Čirić; Borislav Milić; Srećko Nedeljković; Dragoljub Minić; Dražen Marović; Božidar Đurašević	Hungary; László Szabó; Lajos Portisch; Gedeon Barcza; István Bilek; Tibor Florian; Karoly Honfi; Ervin Haág; József Pogáts; Győző Forintos; Levente Lengyel; József Szily; László Navarovszky
1965	(West Germany) Hamburg	USSR; Tigran Petrosian; Mikhail Botvinnik; Viktor Korchnoi; Vasily Smyslov; David Bronstein; Leonid Stein; Mark Taimanov; Yuri Averbakh; Nikolai Krogius; Isaac Boleslavsky; Anatoly Lein; Anatoly Lutikov	Yugoslavia; Borislav Ivkov; Svetozar Gligorić; Aleksandar Matanović; Milan Matulović; Bruno Parma; Petar Trifunović; Mato Damjanović; Mijo Udovčić; Dragoljub Čirić; Dragoljub Minić; Dražen Marović; Ivan Buljovčić	Hungary; Lajos Portisch; László Szabó; István Bilek; Levente Lengyel; Gedeon Barcza; Győző Forintos; Karoly Honfi; Péter Dely; János Flesch; Gyula Kluger; József Pogáts; László Navarovszky
1970	(Austria) Kapfenberg	USSR; Tigran Petrosian; Viktor Korchnoi; Lev Polugaevsky; Efim Geller; Vasily Smyslov; Mark Taimanov; Mikhail Tal; Paul Keres; Leonid Stein; Ratmir Kholmov; Yuri Balashov; Aivars Gipslis	Hungary; Lajos Portisch; Levente Lengyel; László Szabó; Gedeon Barcza; László Bárczay; István Bilek; Péter Dely; István Csom; Győző Forintos; Karoly Honfi; András Adorján; Ervin Haág	East Germany; Wolfgang Uhlmann; Burkhard Malich; Reinhart Fuchs; Artur Hennings; Heinz Liebert; Lothar Zinn; Friedrich Baumbach; Lutz Espig; Werner Golz; Lothar Vogt; Manfred Schöneberg; Detlef Neukirch
1973	(England) Bath	USSR; Boris Spassky; Tigran Petrosian; Viktor Korchnoi; Anatoly Karpov; Mikhail Tal; Vasily Smyslov; Efim Geller; Gennady Kuzmin; Vladimir Tukmakov; Yuri Balashov	Yugoslavia; Svetozar Gligorić; Borislav Ivkov; Ljubomir Ljubojević; Aleksandar Matanović; Bruno Parma; Albin Planinc; Dragoljub Velimirović; Milan Matulović; Enver Bukić; Dragoljub Minić	Hungary; Lajos Portisch; László Szabó; István Bilek; Zoltán Ribli; István Csom; Győző Forintos; András Adorján; Gyula Sax; Karoly Honfi; János Tompa
1977	(Soviet Union) Moscow	USSR; Anatoly Karpov; Tigran Petrosian; Lev Polugaevsky; Mikhail Tal; Yuri Balashov; Efim Geller; Oleg Romanishin; Vitaly Tseshkovsky; Iosif Dorfman; Evgeny Sveshnikov	Hungary; Lajos Portisch; Zoltán Ribli; Gyula Sax; István Csom; András Adorján; Iván Faragó; László Vadász; László Bárczay; Péter Lukács; László Hazai	Yugoslavia; Ljubomir Ljubojević; Svetozar Gligorić; Aleksandar Matanović; Dragoljub Velimirović; Bruno Parma; Borislav Ivkov; Enver Bukić; Krunoslav Hulak; Milorad Knežević; Srđan Marangunić
1980	(Sweden) Skara	USSR; Anatoly Karpov; Mikhail Tal; Tigran Petrosian; Lev Polugaevsky; Efim Geller; Yuri Balashov; Oleg Romanishin; Rafael Vaganian; Artur Yusupov; Garry Kasparov	Hungary; Lajos Portisch; Zoltán Ribli; András Adorján; Gyula Sax; István Csom; Iván Faragó; László Vadász; József Pintér; Péter Lukács; László Hazai	England; Tony Miles; Michael Stean; John Nunn; Jonathan Speelman; Raymond Keene; William Hartston; Jonathan Mestel; Robert Bellin; Paul Littlewood; Simon Webb
1983	(Bulgaria) Plovdiv	USSR; Anatoly Karpov; Lev Polugaevsky; Tigran Petrosian; Rafael Vaganian; Alexander Beliavsky; Vladimir Tukmakov; Lev Psakhis; Oleg Romanishin; Artur Yusupov; Efim Geller	Yugoslavia; Ljubomir Ljubojević; Svetozar Gligorić; Predrag Nikolić; Vlatko Kovačević; Bojan Kurajica; Krunoslav Hulak; Dušan Rajković; Božidar Ivanović; Stefan Đurić; Mišo Cebalo	Hungary; Lajos Portisch; Zoltán Ribli; Gyula Sax; József Pintér; András Adorján; István Csom; Iván Faragó; Attila Grószpéter; Attila Schneider; Tamás Horváth
1989	(Israel) Haifa	USSR; Valery Salov; Alexander Beliavsky; Rafael Vaganian; Mikhail Gurevich; Boris Gelfand; Lev Polugaevsky; Viacheslav Eingorn; Vladimir Tukmakov	Yugoslavia; Ivan Sokolov; Krunoslav Hulak; Bogdan Lalić; Miodrag Todorcevic; Vlatko Kovačević; Dragan Barlov; Ognjen Cvitan; Stefan Đurić	West Germany; Robert Hübner; Vlastimil Hort; Eric Lobron; Stefan Kindermann; Matthias Wahls; Jörg Hickl; Klaus Bischoff; Stefan Mohr
1992	(Hungary) Debrecen	Russia; Garry Kasparov; Evgeny Bareev; Vladimir Kramnik; Alexey Dreev; Alexey Vyzmanavin	Ukraine; Vassily Ivanchuk; Alexander Beliavsky; Oleg Romanishin; Viacheslav Eingorn; Igor Novikov	England; Nigel Short; Jonathan Speelman; Michael Adams; John Nunn; Tony Miles
1997	(Croatia) Pula	England; Nigel Short; Michael Adams; Jonathan Speelman; Matthew Sadler; Julian Hodgson	Russia; Evgeny Bareev; Peter Svidler; Vadim Zvjaginsev; Igor Glek; Yuri Yakovich	Armenia; Vladimir Akopian; Rafael Vaganian; Smbat Lputian; Artashes Minasian; Ashot Anastasian
1999	(Georgia (country)) Batumi	Armenia; Smbat Lputian; Artashes Minasian; Ashot Anastasian; Levon Aronian; Arshak Petrosian	Hungary; Peter Leko; Judit Polgár; Zoltán Almási; Alexander Chernin; József Pintér	Germany; Artur Yusupov; Robert Hübner; Rustem Dautov; Christopher Lutz; Christian Gabriel
2001	(Spain) León	Netherlands; Loek van Wely; Jeroen Piket; Sergei Tiviakov; Erik van den Doel; Friso Nijboer	France; Étienne Bacrot; Joël Lautier; Christian Bauer; Jean-Marc Degraeve; Laurent Fressinet	Germany; Christopher Lutz; Robert Hübner; Gerald Hertneck; Klaus Bischoff; Rainer Buhmann
2003	(Bulgaria) Plovdiv	Russia; Peter Svidler; Evgeny Bareev; Alexander Grischuk; Alexander Morozevich; Alexander Khalifman	Israel; Boris Gelfand; Ilya Smirin; Emil Sutovsky; Boris Avrukh; Michael Roiz	Georgia; Zurab Azmaiparashvili; Baadur Jobava; Mikheil Mchedlishvili; Giorgi Kacheishvili; Merab Gagunashvili
2005	(Sweden) Gothenburg	Netherlands; Loek van Wely; Ivan Sokolov; Sergei Tiviakov; Jan Timman; Erik van den Doel	Israel; Boris Gelfand; Emil Sutovsky; Ilya Smirin; Boris Avrukh; Sergey Erenburg	France; Étienne Bacrot; Joël Lautier; Iosif Dorfman; Laurent Fressinet; Christian Bauer
2007	(Greece) Crete	Russia; Peter Svidler; Alexander Morozevich; Alexander Grischuk; Evgeny Alekseev; Dmitry Jakovenko	Armenia; Levon Aronian; Vladimir Akopian; Gabriel Sargissian; Karen Asrian; Smbat Lputian	Azerbaijan; Teimour Radjabov; Vugar Gashimov; Qadir Huseynov; Shakhriyar Mamedyarov; Rauf Mamedov
2009	(Serbia) Novi Sad	Azerbaijan; Teimour Radjabov; Vugar Gashimov; Qadir Huseynov; Shakhriyar Mamedyarov; Rauf Mamedov	Russia; Peter Svidler; Alexander Morozevich; Dmitry Jakovenko; Evgeny Alekseev; Evgeny Tomashevsky	Ukraine; Pavel Eljanov; Andrei Volokitin; Zahar Efimenko; Yuri Drozdovskij; Yuriy Kryvoruchko
2011	(Greece) Porto Carras	Germany; Arkadij Naiditsch; Georg Meier; Daniel Fridman; Jan Gustafsson; Rainer Buhmann	Azerbaijan; Teimour Radjabov; Vugar Gashimov; Shakhriyar Mamedyarov; Qadir Huseynov; Eltaj Safarli	Hungary; Peter Leko; Zoltán Almási; Ferenc Berkes; Csaba Balogh; Zoltan Gyimesi
2013	(Poland) Warsaw	Azerbaijan; Shakhriyar Mamedyarov; Teimour Radjabov; Eltaj Safarli; Rauf Mamedov; Qadir Huseynov	France; Étienne Bacrot; Maxime Vachier-Lagrave; Romain Édouard; Vladislav Tkachiev; Hichem Hamdouchi	Russia; Alexander Grischuk; Peter Svidler; Dmitry Andreikin; Alexander Morozevich; Evgeny Tomashevsky
2015	(Iceland) Reykjavík	Russia; Peter Svidler; Alexander Grischuk; Evgeny Tomashevsky; Ian Nepomniachtchi; Dmitry Jakovenko	Armenia; Levon Aronian; Gabriel Sargissian; Sergei Movsesian; Hrant Melkumyan; Karen H. Grigoryan	Hungary; Peter Leko; Richárd Rapport; Zoltán Almási; Ferenc Berkes; Csaba Balogh
2017	(Greece) Crete	Azerbaijan; Shakhriyar Mamedyarov; Teimour Radjabov; Arkadij Naiditsch; Rauf Mamedov; Gadir Guseinov	Russia; Alexander Grischuk; Ian Nepomniachtchi; Nikita Vitiugov; Maxim Matlakov; Daniil Dubov	Ukraine; Pavel Eljanov; Yuriy Kryvoruchko; Ruslan Ponomariov; Yuriy Kuzubov; Martyn Kravtsiv
2019	(Georgia (country)) Batumi	Russia; Dmitry Andreikin; Nikita Vitiugov; Kirill Alekseenko; Maxim Matlakov; Daniil Dubov	Ukraine; Vassily Ivanchuk; Yuriy Kuzubov; Andrei Volokitin; Alexander Moiseenko; Vladimir Onischuk	England; Michael Adams; Luke McShane; David Howell; Gawain Jones; Nicholas Pert
2021	(Slovenia) Čatež ob Savi	Ukraine; Anton Korobov; Andrei Volokitin; Yuriy Kuzubov; Kirill Shevchenko; Volodymyr Onyshchuk	France; Alireza Firouzja; Maxime Vachier-Lagrave; Étienne Bacrot; Maxime Lagarde; Jules Moussard	Poland; Jan-Krzysztof Duda; Radosław Wojtaszek; Kacper Piorun; Wojciech Moranda; Paweł Teclaf
2023	(Montenegro) Budva	Serbia; Alexandr Predke; Alexey Sarana; Aleksandar Inđić; Robert Markuš; Velimir Ivić	Germany; Vincent Keymer; Rasmus Svane; Matthias Blübaum; Alexander Donchenko; Dmitrij Kollars	Armenia; Haik M. Martirosyan; Gabriel Sargissian; Hrant Melkumyan; Shant Sargsyan; Samvel Ter-Sahakyan
2025	(Georgia (country)) Batumi	Ukraine; Ruslan Ponomariov; Andrei Volokitin; Anton Korobov; Igor Kovalenko; Ihor Samunenkov	Azerbaijan; Shakhriyar Mamedyarov; Rauf Mamedov; Eltaj Safarli; Aydin Suleymanli; Mahammad Muradli	Serbia; Alexandr Predke; Alexey Sarana; Aleksandar Inđić; Velimir Ivić; Robert Markuš

=== Women section ===
Year	Location	Gold	Silver	Bronze
1992	(Hungary) Debrecen	Ukraine; Alisa Galliamova; Marta Litinskaya; Irina Chelushkina	Georgia; Ketevan Arakhamia; Nino Gurieli; Ketino Kachiani	Azerbaijan; Firuza Velikhanli; Ilaha Kadimova
1997	(Croatia) Pula	Georgia; Maia Chiburdanidze; Nana Ioseliani; Ketevan Arakhamia	Romania; Corina Peptan; Cristina Foișor; Elena Cosma	England; Susan Lalic; Harriet Hunt; Ruth Sheldon
1999	(Georgia (country)) Batumi	Slovakia; Zuzana Hagarova; Regina Pokorná; Alena Bekiarisova	FR Yugoslavia; Alisa Marić; Nataša Bojković; Maria Manakova	Romania; Corina Peptan; Szidonia Vajda; Elena Cosma
2001	(Spain) León	France; Maria Nepeina-Leconte; Marie Sebag; Roza Lallemand	Moldova; Almira Skripchenko; Svetlana Petrenko	England; Harriet Hunt; Jovanka Houska; Susan Lalic
2003	(Bulgaria) Plovdiv	Armenia; Elina Danielian; Lilit Mkrtchian; Nelly Aginian	Hungary; Yelena Dembo; Szidonia Vajda; Anita Gara	Russia; Alisa Galliamova; Svetlana Matveeva; Alexandra Kosteniuk
2005	(Sweden) Gothenburg	Poland; Iweta Rajlich; Monika Soćko; Jolanta Zawadzka; Joanna Dworakowska; Marta Zielinska	Georgia; Maia Chiburdanidze; Nino Khurtsidze; Maia Lomineishvili; Nana Dzagnidze; Ketevan Arakhamia	Russia; Alexandra Kosteniuk; Nadezhda Kosintseva; Ekaterina Kovalevskaya; Tatiana Kosintseva; Alisa Galliamova
2007	(Greece) Crete	Russia; Alexandra Kosteniuk; Tatiana Kosintseva; Nadezhda Kosintseva; Ekaterina Kovalevskaya; Ekaterina Korbut	Poland; Monika Soćko; Iweta Rajlich; Jolanta Zawadzka; Joanna Dworakowska; Marta Przezdziecka	Armenia; Elina Danielian; Lilit Mkrtchian; Nelly Aginian; Siranush Andriasian; Liana Aghabekian
2009	(Serbia) Novi Sad	Russia; Alexandra Kosteniuk; Tatiana Kosintseva; Nadezhda Kosintseva; Marina Romanko; Valentina Gunina	Georgia; Nana Dzagnidze; Lela Javakhishvili; Sopiko Khukhashvili; Nino Khurtsidze; Bela Khotenashvili	Ukraine; Kateryna Lahno; Natalia Zhukova; Anna Ushenina; Inna Gaponenko; Natalia Zdebskaya
2011	(Greece) Porto Carras	Russia; Nadezhda Kosintseva; Tatiana Kosintseva; Valentina Gunina; Alexandra Kosteniuk; Natalia Pogonina	Poland; Monika Soćko; Jolanta Zawadzka; Joanna Majdan-Gajewska; Karina Szczepkowska-Horowska; Katarzyna Toma	Georgia; Nana Dzagnidze; Lela Javakhishvili; Nazí Paikidze; Nino Khurtsidze; Salome Melia
2013	(Poland) Warsaw	Ukraine; Kateryna Lahno; Anna Ushenina; Mariya Muzychuk; Natalia Zhukova; Inna Gaponenko	Russia; Valentina Gunina; Alexandra Kosteniuk; Natalia Pogonina; Olga Girya; Aleksandra Goryachkina	Poland; Monika Soćko; Jolanta Zawadzka; Joanna Majdan-Gajewska; Iweta Rajlich; Karina Szczepkowska-Horowska
2015	(Iceland) Reykjavík	Russia; Alexandra Kosteniuk; Kateryna Lagno; Valentina Gunina; Aleksandra Goryachkina; Anastasia Bodnaruk	Ukraine; Mariya Muzychuk; Anna Muzychuk; Natalia Zhukova; Anna Ushenina; Inna Gaponenko	Georgia; Nana Dzagnidze; Bela Khotenashvili; Lela Javakhishvili; Nino Batsiashvili; Meri Arabidze
2017	(Greece) Crete	Russia; Alexandra Kosteniuk; Kateryna Lagno; Valentina Gunina; Olga Girya; Aleksandra Goryachkina	Georgia; Nana Dzagnidze; Nino Batsiashvili; Bela Khotenashvili; Lela Javakhishvili; Salome Melia	Ukraine; Anna Muzychuk; Natalia Zhukova; Anna Ushenina; Inna Gaponenko; Iulija Osmak
2019	(Georgia (country)) Batumi	Russia; Aleksandra Goryachkina; Kateryna Lagno; Olga Girya; Valentina Gunina; Alina Kashlinskaya	Georgia; Nana Dzagnidze; Lela Javakhishvili; Bela Khotenashvili; Meri Arabidze; Salome Melia	Azerbaijan; Gunay Mammadzada; Khanim Balajayeva; Ulviyya Fataliyeva; Gulnar Mammadova; Turkan Mamedyarova
2021	(Slovenia) Čatež ob Savi	Russia; Aleksandra Goryachkina; Kateryna Lagno; Valentina Gunina; Polina Shuvalova; Alina Kashlinskaya	Georgia; Nana Dzagnidze; Lela Javakhishvili; Meri Arabidze; Salome Melia; Sopio Gvetadze	Azerbaijan; Gunay Mammadzada; Gulnar Mammadova; Khanim Balajayeva; Ulviyya Fataliyeva; Govhar Beydullayeva
2023	(Montenegro) Budva	Bulgaria; Antoaneta Stefanova; Nurgyul Salimova; Viktoria Radeva; Gergana Peycheva; Beloslava Krasteva	Azerbaijan; Gunay Mammadzada; Ulviyya Fataliyeva; Govhar Beydullayeva; Khanim Balajayeva; Gulnar Mammadova	France; Deimantė Daulyte-Cornette; Sophie Milliet; Mitra Hejazipour; Pauline Guichard; Anastasia Savina
2025	(Georgia (country)) Batumi	Poland; Alina Kashlinskaya; Aleksandra Maltsevskaya; Oliwia Kiołbasa; Monika Soćko; Klaudia Kulon	Ukraine; Yuliia Osmak; Anna Ushenina; Inna Gaponenko; Natalia Zhukova; Bozhena Piddubna	Germany; Dinara Wagner; Hanna Marie Klek; Josefine Safarli; Lara Schulze; Kateryna Dolzhykova

== Total team ranking ==
=== Open section ===
The table contains the open teams ranked by the medals won at the European Team Championship.

Rank	Nation	Gold	Silver	Bronze	Total
1	Soviet Union	9	0	0	9
2	Russia	5	3	1	9
3	Azerbaijan	3	2	1	6
4	Ukraine	2	2	2	6
5	Netherlands	2	0	0	2
6	Armenia	1	2	2	5
7	Germany	1	1	3	5
8	England	1	0	3	4
9	Serbia	1	0	1	2
10	Yugoslavia	0	6	1	7
11	Hungary	0	4	6	10
12	France	0	3	1	4
13	Israel	0	2	0	2
14	Czechoslovakia	0	0	1	1
14	East Germany	0	0	1	1
14	Georgia	0	0	1	1
14	Poland	0	0	1	1
Totals (17 entries)		25	25	25	75

=== Women section ===
The table contains the women's teams ranked by the medals won at the European Team Championship.

Rank	Nation	Gold	Silver	Bronze	Total
1	Russia	7	1	2	10
2	Ukraine	2	2	2	6
3	Georgia	1	6	2	9
4	Poland	1	2	1	4
5	Armenia	1	0	1	2
5	France	1	0	1	2
7	Bulgaria	1	0	0	1
7	Slovakia	1	0	0	1
9	Azerbaijan	0	1	3	4
10	Romania	0	1	1	2
11	Hungary	0	1	0	1
11	Moldova	0	1	0	1
11	Serbia and Montenegro	0	1	0	1
14	England	0	0	2	2
Totals (14 entries)		15	16	15	46

== See also ==
- Chess Olympiad
- Women's Chess Olympiad
- World Team Chess Championship
- Chess at the African Games
- Pan American Team Chess Championship
- Asian Team Chess Championship
- Russia (USSR) vs Rest of the World
- European Chess Club Cup
- Correspondence Chess Olympiad
