= Ervin Haág =

Hungarian chess player (1933–2018)

Personal information
- Born: 11 January 1933 Mosonmagyaróvár, Hungary
- Died: 23 October 2018 (aged 85)

Chess career
- Country: Hungary
- Title: International Master (1961)
- Peak rating: 2440 (July 1971)

Ervin Haág (11 January 1933 – 23 October 2018) was a Hungarian chess International Master (IM, 1961). He was European Team Chess Championship silver (1970) and bronze (1961) medalist.

== Biography ==
In the 1960s Ervin Haág was one of the top Hungarian chess players. He participated in the individual finals of the Hungarian Chess Championships many times and won three medals: silver (1966) and two bronze (1960, 1967). One of his greatest successes in International Chess tournaments was in 1961 in Debrecen, where he shared the 1st place (together with Isaac Boleslavsky) in the Lajos Asztalos Memorial.

His career highest chess ranking was on 1 July 1971, with a score of 2,440 points, split 11th–13th at the time place among Hungarian chess players.

Ervin Haág played for Hungary in the European Team Chess Championships:

- In 1961, at the seventh board in the 2nd European Team Chess Championship in Oberhausen (+4, =2, -2) and won team and individual bronze medals.
- In 1970, at second reserve board in the 4th European Team Chess Championship in Kapfenberg (+1, =2, -0) and won team silver medal.

Ervin Haág played for Hungary in the World Student Team Chess Championships:

- In 1955, at second reserve board in the 2nd World Student Team Chess Championship in Lyon (+2, =3, -0) and won team bronze medal,
- In 1957, at first reserve board in the 4th World Student Team Chess Championship in Reykjavík (+3, =0, -1),
- In 1958, at third board in the 5th World Student Team Chess Championship in Varna (+0, =4, -2),
- In 1959, at fourth board in the 6th World Student Team Chess Championship in Budapest (+2, =1, -2) and won team bronze medal.

Ervin Haág played for chess club Spartacus Budapest in the European Men's Chess Club Cups:

- In 1976, in the 1st European Chess Club Cup (+2, =3, -1),
- In 1982, in the 3rd European Chess Club Cup (+2, =3, -1) and won team tournament,
- In 1984, in the 4th European Chess Club Cup (+1, =1, -0).

Ervin Haág was also successful in correspondence chess. He won Hungarian Correspondence Chess Championship. In 1961 he received the title of International Master in this variant of chess.

Ervin Haág was member of the Presidium of the Hungarian Chess Federation since 1971. He was President of the Hungarian Chess Federation from 1979 to 1984.

He was engaged in chess coaching. The most famous wards are István Csom, Péter Lukács, Attila Schneider, Laszlo Cherna, Tibor Tolnai.

Ervin Haág graduated from Applied mathematics University of Budapest. He worked as a programmer in the textile industry. From 1972 to 1979 he worked in the book publishing house Lapkiadó Vállalat, at the same time he was the editor-in-chief of the chess magazine Magyar Sakkélet.

Together with Győző Forintos, he was the author of two books on Chess openings:

- Petrov's Defence, 1992, ISBN 0-02-028561-2,
- Easy Guide to the 5.Nge2 King's Indian Defence, 2000, ISBN 1-85744-245-8.
