= Hazai =

Hazai is a Hungarian surname. Notable people with this surname include:

- Attila Hazai (1967–2012), Hungarian writer
- Kálmán Hazai (1913–1996), Hungarian water polo player
- László Hazai (born 1953), Hungarian chess grandmaster
- Samu Hazai (1851–1942), Hungarian military officer and politician
