= Péter Lukács =

Peter Lukács may refer to:

- Péter Lukács (chess player) (born 1950), Hungarian chess Grandmaster
- Péter Lukács (handballer) (born 2002), Hungarian handball player
