= Cyril Marcelin =

French chess grandmaster (born 1979)

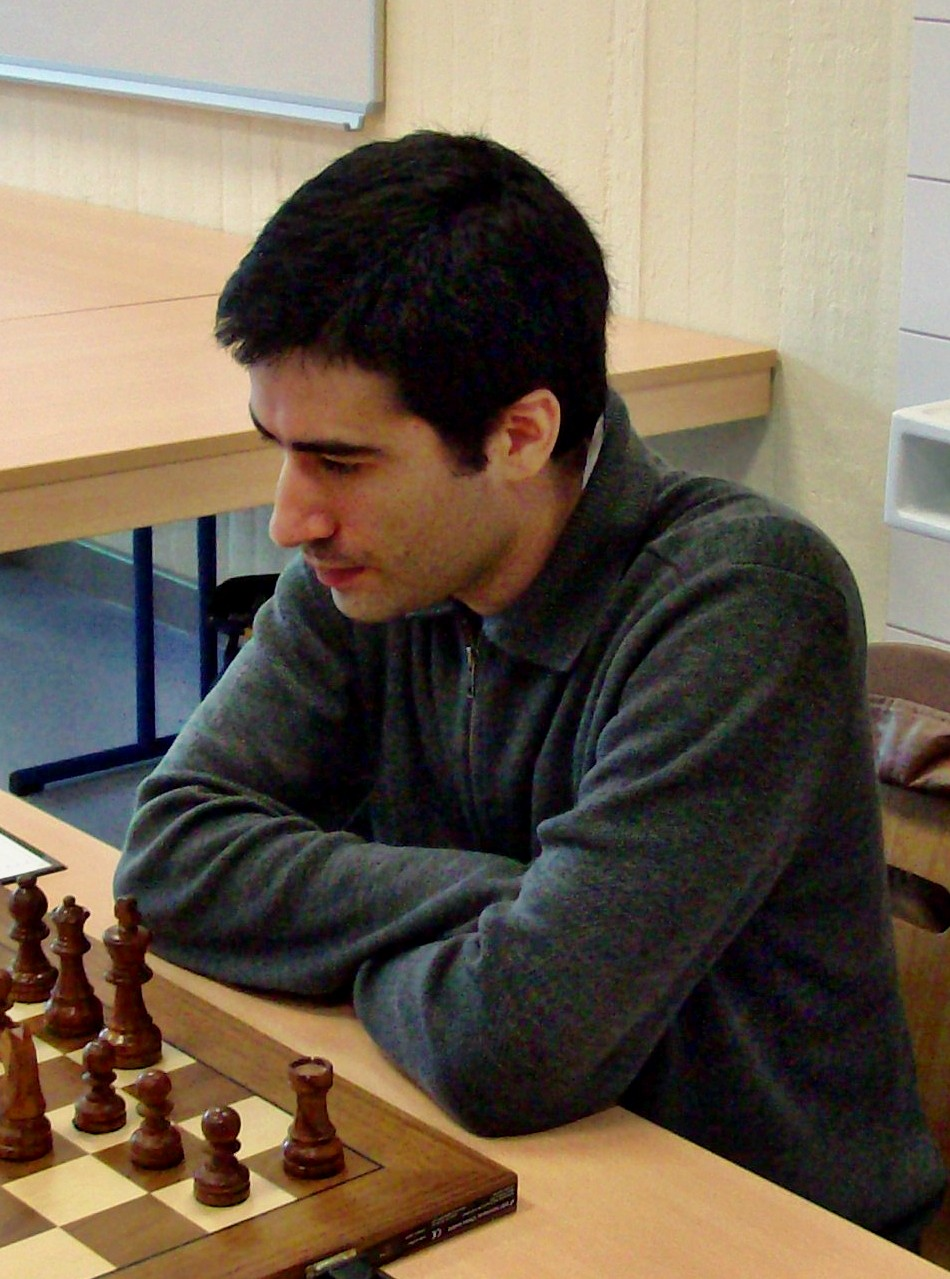
- Marcelin in 2009

Personal information
- Born: May 16, 1979 (age 47) Suresnes, France

Chess career
- Country: France
- Title: Grandmaster (2002)
- FIDE rating: 2432 (November 2026)
- Peak rating: 2514 (July 2007)

Cyril Marcelin is a French chess grandmaster.

== Chess career ==
He began playing chess at the age of 7, and joined the Suresnes chess club in 1989. In 1996, he was a co-champion of the French Cadet Championships. He was mentored by Josif Dorfman beginning the following year.

In June 2014, he played for the Bischwiller team in the Saint-Quentin Team Championship.

In October 2022, he played for the Austrian team Schach ohne Grenzen in the European Chess Club Cup. The team finished 20th overall.

== Personal life ==
He lives in Austria with his wife and two children.
