= Anthony Kosten =

English-French chess grandmaster and author (born 1958)

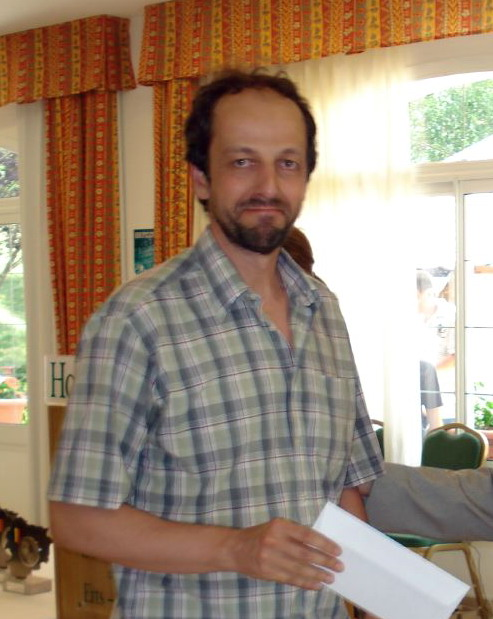

Personal information
- Born: Anthony Cornelis Kosten; 24 July 1958 (age 67) London, United Kingdom

Chess career
- Country: France (until 2023); England (since 2023)
- Title: Grandmaster (1990)
- Peak rating: 2551 (July 2002)

Anthony Cornelis Kosten (born 24 July 1958 in London) is an English-French chess Grandmaster and chess author.

== Chess career ==
In 1982 he placed third in the British Championship, held in Torquay. In 1989 he moved to France and since then has captained and coached that country in major competitions.

Kosten played many tournaments, finishing first or equal first in the following:

- 1984 Budapest
- 1985 Andorra International Open
- 1986 Geneva International Open, clear first at 8.5/9
- 1987 Cappelle-la-Grande Open (first on tie-break)
- 1987 Challengers Open, Hastings Congress 1987–88
- 1989 Challengers Open, Hastings Congress 1989–90
- 1991 San Benedetto del Tronto
- 1992 Mandelieu-la-Napoule
- 1993 14th Festival of Asti
- 1994 Chanac (repeated in 1995)
- 1995 Saint-Affrique
- 2000 Naujac-sur-Mer – L'Étang-Salé
- 2004 Montpellier – Villeurbanne
- 2005 Mundolsheim
- 2006 Cap d'Agde
- 2007 Clermont-Ferrand – Saint-Dié-des-Vosges
- 2008 Avoine, Indre-et-Loire – Kilkenny
- 2010 Wellington College International

Perhaps the most striking of these performances was at the 1st Geneva Open tournament of 1986 (170 players, including several grandmasters, among them Anthony Miles, Miguel Quinteros or Armenian Smbat Lputian from the Soviet Union). The event was nine rounds and Kosten won all of his first eight games. This was sufficient to already guarantee him first place ahead of a strong international field. In the final game, Kosten accepted a draw offer from his compatriot, Glenn Flear. He agreed after some half an hour's deliberation, for the position was hopelessly lost for Flear. That acceptance prevented Kosten from achieving a perfect 9/9 score. IM Kosten won outright a full point ahead of second placed GM Lars Karlsson.

He lives in Clermont-Ferrand, France, and is now naturalized French and registered on the French Elo list.

Kosten was married to the daughter of Hungarian Grandmaster Győző Forintos.

== Team Championships ==
With the English national team he participated in the European Championship in 1989 in Haifa, where he received the individual bronze medal for his score of 5 points from 7 games on the first reserve board. In 1990 he played for England in the 1st VISA Chess Summit in Rekyavik. England came second.

In the British Team Championships 4NCL, he won with Slough in 1996, 1999 and 2000 and with Guildford in 2004, 2007 and 2008. He twice won the French Team Championships with Monaco, in 2001 and 2002. In Germany he has played on the first board of Schott Mainz since 1994. In Austria, he played for Frohnleiten from 2001, which became Holz Dohr-Semriach from the 2004–05 season. In the 2007–08 season he was the best player with Rainer Buhmann. In Switzerland, he played for Lausanne Le Joueur, and he was also active in the Hungarian (for MTK) and Basque (for Oaso X.T.) Team Championships.

== Publications ==
He published many chess books as Tony Kosten, mostly on the openings:

- Winning Endgames, Crowood, 1987, ISBN 978-0-946284-69-6
- Winning with the Philidor, Batsford, 1992, ISBN 978-0-7134-6945-5
- New Ideas in the Nimzo-Indian Defence, Batsford, 1994, ISBN 978-0-7134-7377-3
- Latvian Gambit, Batsford, 1995, ISBN 978-0-7134-8629-2
- 101 Tips to Improve your Chess, Batsford, 1996, ISBN 978-0-7134-7899-0
- Trends in the Philidor, Trends Publications, 1997, ISBN 1-85932-032-5.
- French Advance, Everyman Chess, 1998, ISBN 978-1-901259-10-0
- Mastering the Nimzo-Indian with the Read and Play Method, Batsford, 1998, ISBN 978-0-7134-8383-3
- The Dynamic English, Gambit Publications, 1999, ISBN 978-1-901983-14-2
- Easy Guide to the Najdorf, Everyman Chess, 1999, ISBN 978-1-85744-529-9
- Classical Sicilian (B56-B59) . ChessBase, 2000, ISBN 3-932466-84-5 (CD-ROM)
- The Latvian Gambit lives!, Batsford, 2001, ISBN 978-0-7134-8629-2
- The Knockout Nimzo, Bad Bishop, 2003, ISBN 978-0-9542934-5-1 (CD-ROM)
- Dangerous Weapons: Flank Openings: Dazzle Your Opponents!, Everyman Chess, 2008, ISBN 978-1-85744-583-1 (With Richard Palliser and James Vigus)
