= John Littlewood =

John Littlewood may refer to:

- John Edensor Littlewood (1885–1977), British mathematician
- John Littlewood (chess player) (1931–2009), British chess player
