= Martijn Dambacher =

Dutch chess grandmaster (born 1979)

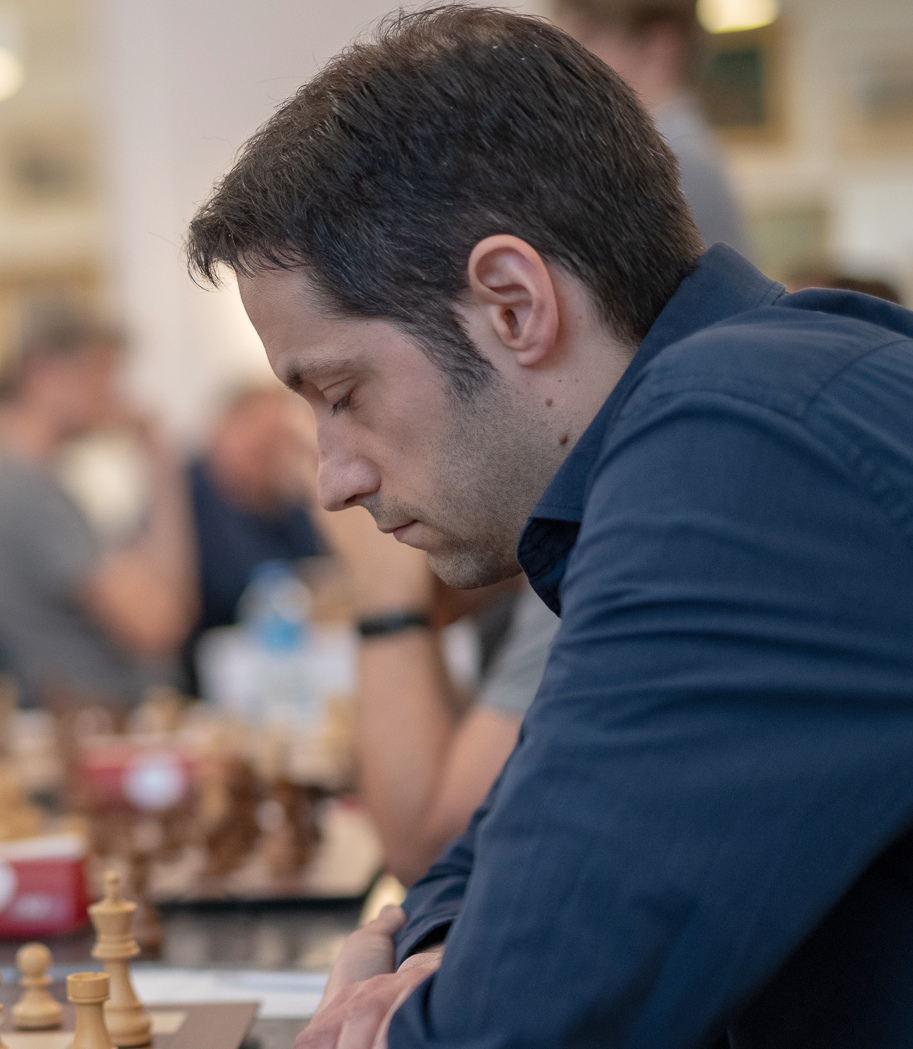
- Dambacher in 2019

Personal information
- Born: October 22, 1979 (age 46) Venlo, Netherlands

Chess career
- Country: Netherlands
- Title: Grandmaster (2014)
- FIDE rating: 2469 (July 2026)
- Peak rating: 2511 (June 2019)

Martijn Dambacher is a Dutch chess grandmaster.

== Chess career ==
In 2014, he achieved his final GM norm at the Chess Bundesliga.

In May 2015, he won the Limburg Open for the eighth time after a draw against Michael Coenen in the final round. He had previously won the tournament in 1998, 2000, 2001, 2007, 2008, 2011, and 2014.

He has played with the Utrecht Chess Club and the Blerick Chess Club.
