= Milorad Knežević =

Serbian chess grandmaster (1936–2005)

Personal information
- Born: 31 October 1936 Cetinje, Montenegro
- Died: 31 March 2005 (aged 68) Belgrad, Serbia

Chess career
- Country: Yugoslavia; Serbia
- Title: Grandmaster (1976)
- Peak rating: 2505 (January 1978)

Milorad Knežević (Serbian: Милорад Кнежевић; 31 October 1936 – 31 March 2005) was a Serbian chess Grandmaster (GM) (1976). He was the European Team Chess Championship bronze (1977) medalist.

== Biography ==
From 1960, Milorad Knežević took part in the finals of the Yugoslav Chess Championship many times. In 1977 in Zagreb he shared the 3rd place together with Bojan Kurajica and Božidar Ivanović. In 1978, he repeated this success, again sharing 3rd place in the next final of the national championship, played in Belgrade.

Milorad Knežević's successes in international chess tournaments included, among others: shared 2nd place in Lublin (1968), 1st place in Starý Smokovec (1974 and 1975), 2nd place in Rimavská Sobota (1974 ), shared 2nd place in Polanica-Zdrój (1976, Akiba Rubinstein memorial), 1st place in Kragujevac (1977), shared 1st place in Sarajevo (1979, tournament Bosna, together with Bojan Kurajica and Iván Faragó), 2nd place in Camagüey (1987, tournament B José Raúl Capablanca Memorial) and shared 3rd place in Belgrade (1993).

Milorad Knežević played for Yugoslavia in the European Team Chess Championship:

- In 1977, at first reserve board in the 6th European Team Chess Championship in Moscow (+1, =3, -0) and won team bronze and individual silver medals.

Milorad Knežević played for Yugoslavia in the World Student Team Chess Championship:

- In 1960, at fourth board in the 7th World Student Team Chess Championship in Leningrad (+6, =6, -1) and won team bronze medal.

Milorad Knežević played for Yugoslavia in the Men's Chess Balkaniads:

- In 1978, at fifth board in the 10th Men's Chess Balkaniad in Băile Herculane (+2, =2, -0) and won team and individual gold medals,
- In 1981, at fourth board in the 13th Chess Balkaniad in Athens (+2, =2, -0) and won team and individual gold medals,
- In 1982, at third board in the 14th Chess Balkaniad in Plovdiv (+3, =0, -2) and won team silver and individual bronze medals.

In 1974, he was awarded the FIDE International Master (IM) title and received the FIDE Grandmaster (GM) title two years later.

Milorad Knežević was a lawyer by profession.
