= János Tompa =

Hungarian chess player (born 1947)

Personal information
- Born: 30 April 1947 (age 79) Celldömölk, Vas County, Hungary

Chess career
- Country: Hungary
- Title: International Master (1979)
- Peak rating: 2455 (July 1995)

János Tompa (born 30 April 1947) is a Hungarian chess International Master (1979). He is a European Team Chess Championship bronze medalist (1973).

== Biography ==
From the mid-1960s to the mid-1990s János Tompa was one of the top Hungarian chess players. He competed many times in the finals of the individual Hungarian Chess Championships and in 1966 won bronze medal. In 1993 János Tompa won silver medal in Hungarian Open Chess Championship.

János Tompa played for Hungary in the European Team Chess Championships:

- In 1973, at second reserve board in the 5th European Team Chess Championship in Bath (+0, =1, -1) and won team bronze medal.

János Tompa played for Hungary in the World Student Team Chess Championships:

- In 1965, at third board in the 12th World Student Team Chess Championship in Sinaia (+1, =3, -4),
- In 1966, at first reserve board in the 13th World Student Team Chess Championship in Örebro (+1, =3, -3),
- In 1967, at second board in the 14th World Student Team Chess Championship in Harrachov (+5, =2, -2),
- In 1969, at first board in the 16th World Student Team Chess Championship in Dresden (+3, =6, -2),
- In 1972, at first reserve board in the 19th World Student Team Chess Championship in Graz (+1, =5, -2) and won team silver medal.

János Tompa played for chess club Törökvész Budapest in the European Chess Club Cup:

- In 1984, in the 8th European Chess Club Cup (+0, =2, -0).

In 1979, János Tompa was awarded the FIDE International Master (IM) title and received the FIDE International Arbiter title in 1992.
