= József Pogáts =

Hungarian chess player

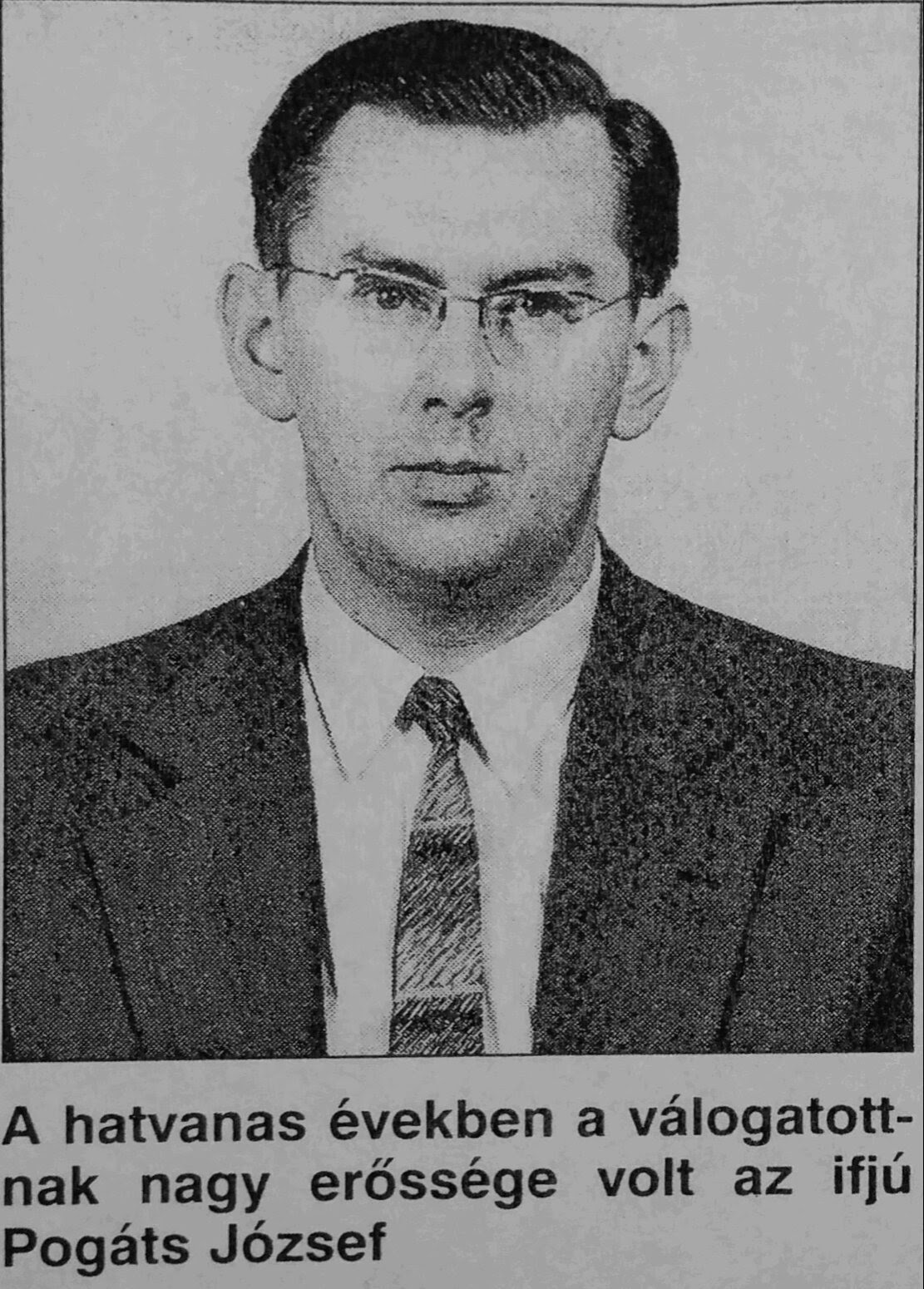

Personal information
- Born: 10 July 1928 Budapest, Hungary
- Died: March 18, 2004 (aged 75) Budapest, Hungary

Chess career
- Country: Hungary
- Title: FIDE Master (1983)
- Peak rating: 2410 (January 1976)

József Pogáts (10 July 1928 – 18 March 2004), was a Hungarian chess FIDE Master (1983) and chess composer who twice won team bronze and individual silver medals in the European Team Chess Championship (1961, 1965).

== Biography ==
In 1951, József Pogáts received a doctorate in law from the University of Budapest. From 1951 to 1959, he worked as a chess instructor, from 1959 to 1971 he was an internal auditor at the Hungarian Investment Bank, and from 1971 to 1981 he worked as a lawyer in the Ministry of Metallurgy and Machine-Building of Hungary.

József Pogáts participated in the Hungarian Chess Championship sixteen times (1950–1972). In his first championship, he achieved the best result, sharing 3rd and 4th place and receiving a bronze medal and the title of National Master. In 1958 he came 6th, in 1961 he shared the 5th–7th places, in 1962 he came 6th, and in 1966 he shared 4th and 5th place.

József Pogáts represented the national team of Hungary in the largest team chess tournaments:

- he participated in the Chess Olympiad in 1952;
- he participated in the European Team Chess Championship twice (1961, 1965) and both times won a bronze medal in the team event and a silver medal in the individual event. In the European Team Championship in 1961, he distinguished himself by his victory over the Soviet chess grandmaster Lev Polugaevsky, which he achieved in 18 moves in the Sicilian Defense.

In the international tournament in Debrecen in 1961, József Pogáts fulfilled the norm for an International Master, but FIDE did not assign him this title. However, in 1983, when FIDE introduced the title of FIDE Master, he was one of the first players who received this title.

József Pogáts was also known as a chess composer. He published his first problem in 1943 and was seriously engaged in chess problems since 1966. József Pogáts worked mainly in the genre fairy chess. His works were often published in the most prestigious publication for chess problemists, FIDE Album.
