= Rainer Buhmann =

German chess grandmaster (born 1981)

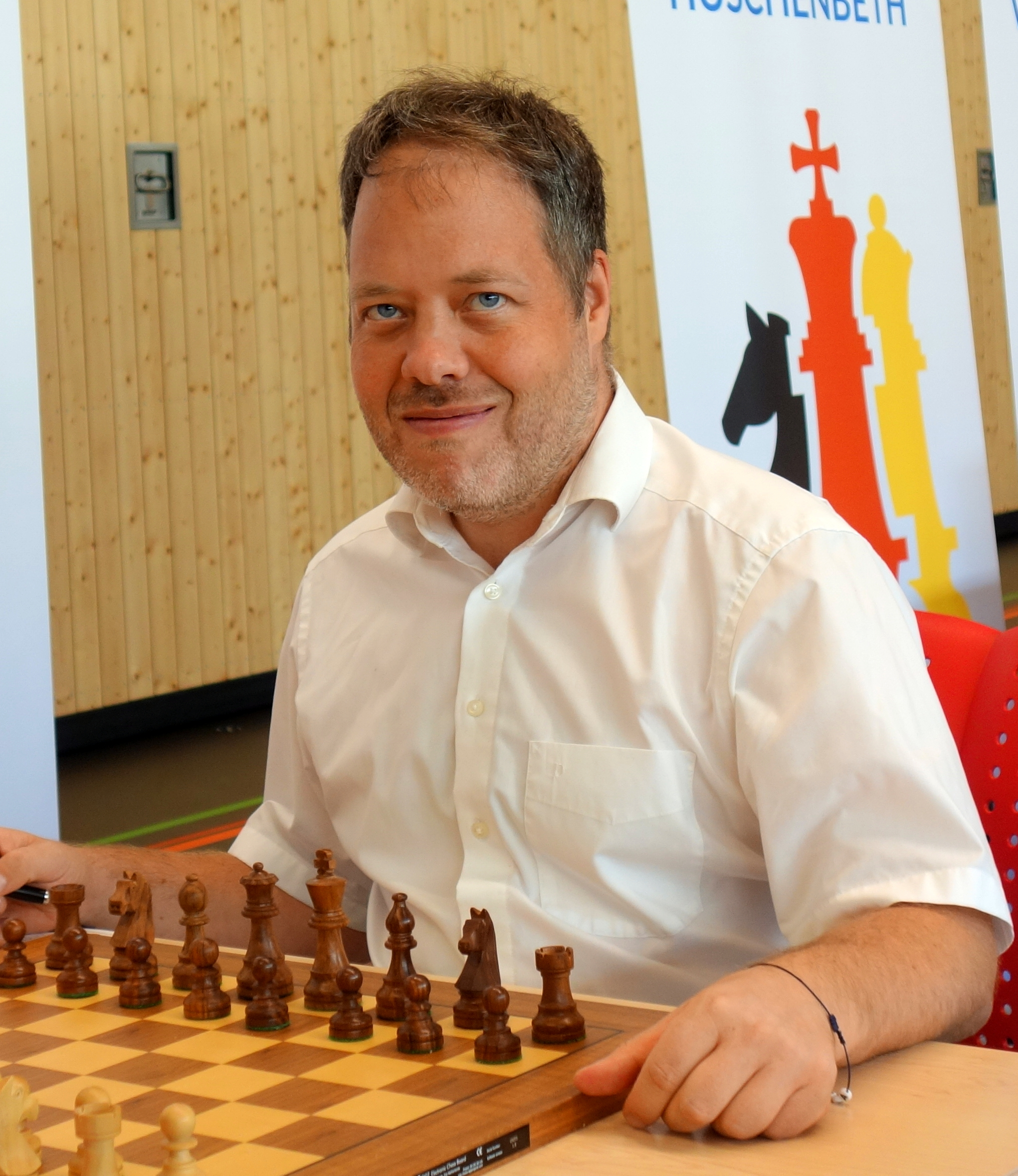
- Rainer Buhmann in 2024

Personal information
- Born: 20 February 1981 (age 45) Leimen, Germany

Chess career
- Country: Germany
- Title: Grandmaster (2007)
- FIDE rating: 2547 (July 2026)
- Peak rating: 2653 (June 2016)

Rainer Buhmann (born 20 February 1981) is a German chess Grandmaster (GM, 2007) who won German Chess Championship (2018) and European Team Chess Championship (2011).

== Biography ==
In 1999 Rainer Buhmann won the German Youth Chess Championships in age group U18 in Oberhof. The following year, at the age of 19, he won the Baden Chess Championship. In 2006 was another successful year for him with victories at a grandmaster tournament (category 10) in Hockenheim/Willingen and at the Böblinger Open.

In 2007, Rainer Buhmann took second place behind Arkadij Naiditsch at the German Chess Championship in Bad Königshofen. With this tournament result, Buhmann fulfilled his third grandmaster norm; the title was awarded to him in June 2007. In October 2007 he won the Open of the Winterthur Chess Week. In August 2018 Buhmann won the German Chess Championship in Dresden for the first time, in May 2019 in Magdeburg he won German Blitz Chess Championship.

Buhmann has been living in Hockenheim since 2007.

== National team ==
Rainer Buhmann has been part of the B squad of the German Chess Federation since 2003, in 2012 he was part of the A squad for the only time so far.

Rainer Buhmann played for the German national team when they won the Chess Mitropa Cup in 2003. He took part in the Chess Olympiad in 2008 and 2010 and was part of the German team at the European Team Chess Championship in 2001 (in which Germany finished third), 2007, 2011 (which Germany won) and 2015.

== Clubs ==
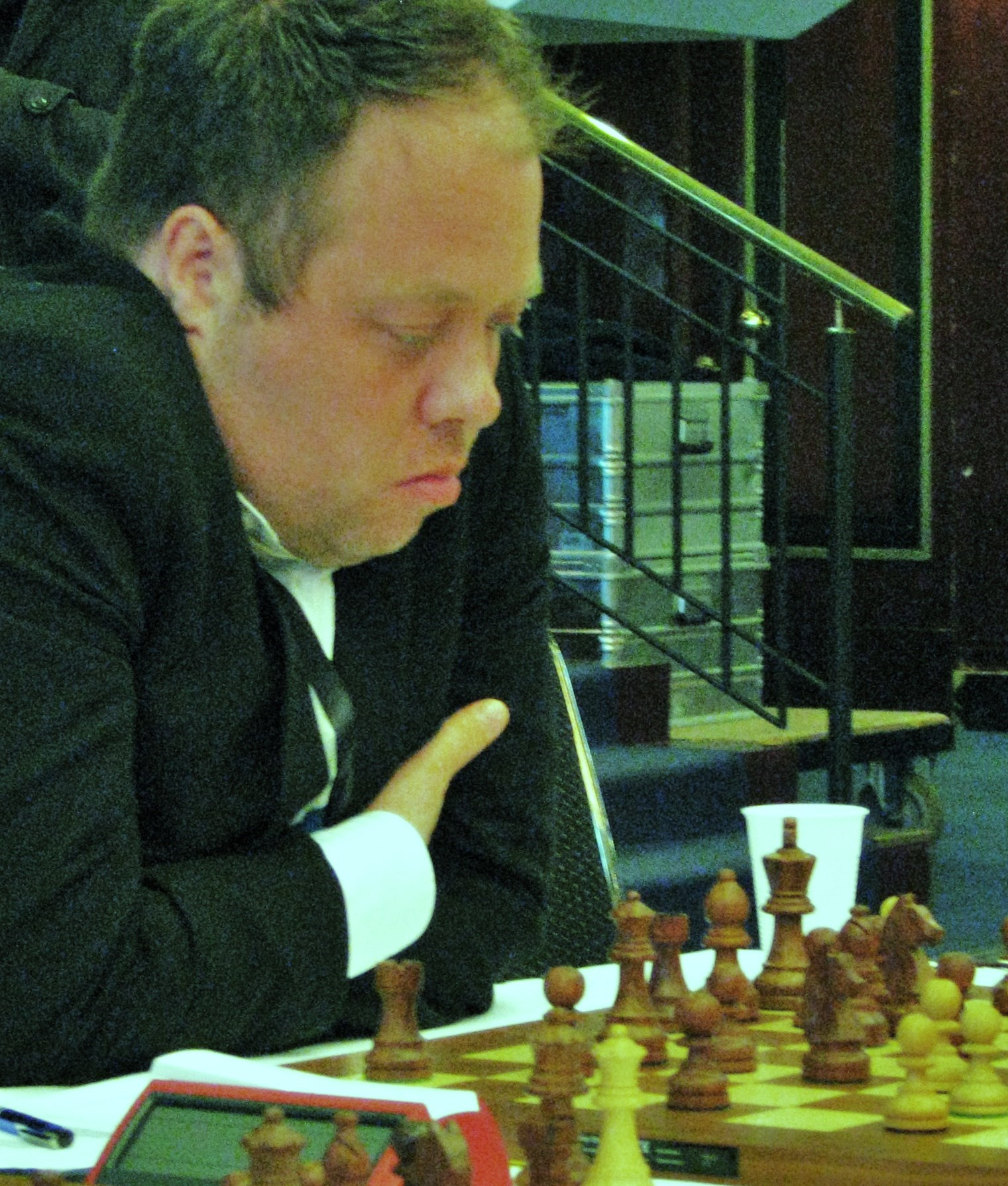
For SV 1930 Hockenheim at the Chess Bundesliga final round 2017 in Berlin

In his youth, Buhmann played for TZ Mannheim and ST Remisdemi Mannheim. From 2000 to 2006 Buhmann played for various clubs in the 1st Chess Bundesliga: 2000/01 for Baiertal-Schatthausen, 2001 to 2003 for the Stuttgarter SF and 2003 to 2006 for the OSC Baden-Baden, with whom he became Chess Bundesliga season 2005/06 champion. For the 2006/07 season he moved to SV 1930 Hockenheim, which he led to promotion to the Oberliga Baden on the top board. From 2008 to 2010 Buhmann played for the Schachgesellschaft Solingen, with which he won the German Team Cup in 2009. He then switched back to SV 1930 Hockenheim, with whom he has been playing in the 1st Chess Bundesliga since the 2011/12 season. In the Austrian Chess 1st Bundesliga he plays for the SK Maria Saal, with which he became 2016 champion and took part in the European Chess Club Cup in 2013. In Switzerland Buhmann has been playing for Schwarz Weiss Bern since 2010, in the Dutch Team Chess Championship he played in the season 2005/06 for U-Boat Worx/De Variant Breda, with which he became champion, and in the season 2007/08 for Schrijvers Rotterdam. In France he has been playing for Bischwiller since 2006, in Hungary for Morihana PSE since 2019.
