= Péter Dely =

Hungarian chess grandmaster (1934–2012)

Personal information
- Born: 5 July 1934 Sárospatak, Hungary
- Died: 29 December 2012 (aged 78)

Chess career
- Country: Hungary
- Title: Grandmaster (1999)
- Peak rating: 2480 (July 1971)
- Peak ranking: No. 95 (July 1972)

Péter Dely (5 July 1934, Sárospatak – 29 December 2012) was a Hungarian chess master and 1969 Hungarian Chess Champion.

== Biography ==
Dely was born in Sárospatak in 1934, became International Master in 1962 and Honorary Grandmaster in 1999. He was one of the strongest Hungarian players in the 1960s and 1970s and won the Hungarian National Championship in 1969. Dely took part in the European Team Championship twice, with the Hungarian team he won silver in 1970, bronze in 1965 and won the individual silver medal for his board in 1970.

He died on 29 December 2012.

=== Achievements ===
- 1960–1961 Reggio Emilia chess tournament – 1st
- 1965 – Rubinstein Memorial – 1st (shared with Evgenij Vasiukov)
- 1965 – 3rd European Team Chess Championship, Hamburg 1965 – Bronze (team)
- 1969 – Hungarian Chess Championship – Champion
- 1970 – International Bagneux Tournament – 1st
- 1970 – 4th European Team Chess Championship, Kapfenberg – Silver (individual and team)
- 1971 – Luxemburg Open – 1st (shared with Aleksander Matanovic)
- 1973 – 6th Lajos Bebrits Memorial Tournament - 2nd
