= Lara Schulze =

German chess player (born 2002)

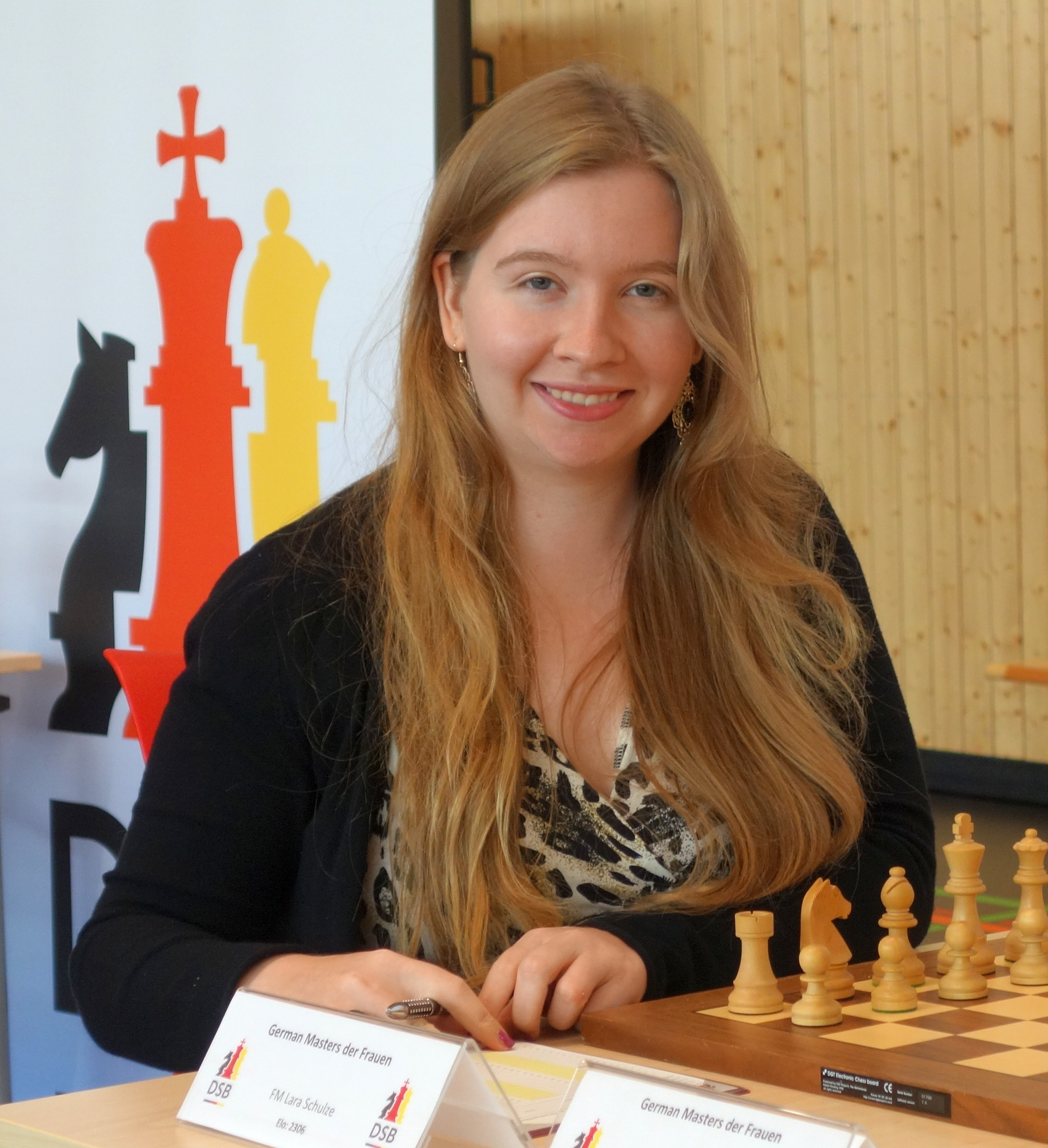
- Lara Schulze in 2024

Personal information
- Born: 21 May 2002 (age 24)

Chess career
- Country: Germany
- Title: FIDE Master (2019); Woman International Master (2021)
- Peak rating: 2345 (September 2019)

Lara Schulze (born 21 May 2002) is a German chess Woman International Master who won the German Women's Chess Championship in 2022.

== Biography ==
At the age of eight, Schulze learned to play chess with SK Lehrte. In the Chess Women's Bundesliga Season 2013/14 she played for the first time. In the years that followed, she became German chess champion and European chess champion several times in her respective age group.

At the FIDE Online Chess Olympiad 2020 and the FIDE Online Chess Olympiad 2021 Schulze played for the German national chess team. Together with Elisabeth Pähtz and Josefine Heinemann she runs the Twitch channel Women's Chess Experts.

In 2021 Schulze switched to SV Werder Bremen and is coached there by Jonathan Carlstedt and Dmitrij Kollars. She is the only woman part of the Bremen squad for the Chess Bundesliga Season 2021/22.

Schulze did her Abitur at the Gymnasium Lehrte in 2021. She lives in Hanover.

== Achievements ==
- 2014: German Chess Champion (U12, girls)
- 2015: German Chess Champion (U14, girls)
- 2016: European Chess Champion (U14, girls)
- 2016: Women's FIDE Master (WFM)
- 2017: German Chess Champion (U16, girls)
- 2018: German Chess Champion (U16, girls)
- 2019: German Chess Champion (U18, girls)
- 2019: FIDE Master (FM)
- 2021: European Chess Champion (U20, girls)
- 2021: German Women's Rapid Chess Champion
- 2021: Woman International Master (WIM)
- 2022: German Chess Champion
- 2022: German Rapid Chess Champion
