= Paul Littlewood =

English chess player (born 1956)

Personal information
- Born: January 18, 1956 (age 70) Skegness, England

Chess career
- Country: England
- Title: International Master (1980)
- Peak rating: 2470 (July 1986)

Paul Edwin Littlewood is an English chess player.

== Chess career ==
In 1981, he won the British Chess Championship.

In July 2016, he held a simultaneous exhibition against 13 students at the Letchworth's Fearnhill School.

In July 2024, he played for England (alongside John Nunn, Anthony Kosten, Jonathan Mestel, and Terry Chapman) in the World Senior Team Championship. The team were seeded first and won the championship.

== Personal life ==
His father was two-time British Senior Chess Champion John Littlewood.
