= Erik van den Doel =

Dutch chess grandmaster (born 1979)

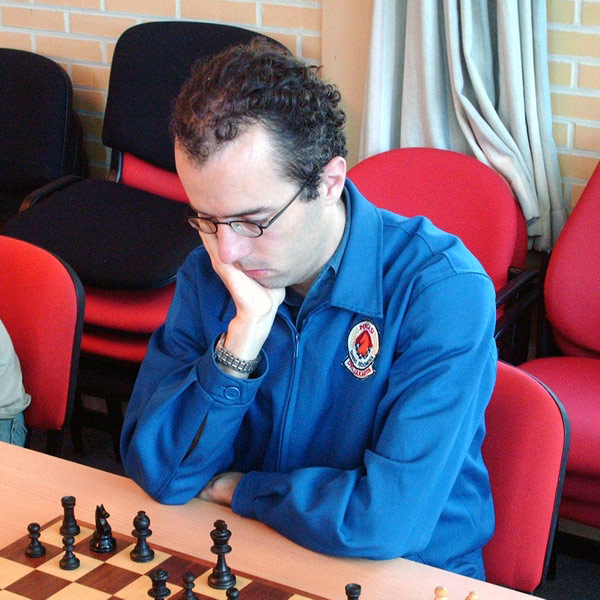
- Erik van den Doel in 2007

Personal information
- Born: 15 May 1979 (age 47) Leiden, Netherlands

Chess career
- Country: Netherlands
- Title: Grandmaster (1998)
- FIDE rating: 2549 (July 2026)
- Peak rating: 2616 (December 2018)
- Peak ranking: No. 81 (July 2001)

Erik van den Doel (born 15 May 1979), is a Dutch chess Grandmaster (GM) (1998), two-times European Team Chess Championship winner (2001, 2005).

== Biography ==
In the 1990s and 2000s Erik van den Doel was one of the leading Dutch chess players. In 2001, in Leeuwarden he shared first place with Loek van Wely in Dutch Chess Championship but lost additional match for the title of national champion. Erik van den Doel is winner of many international chess tournaments, including Alphen aan den Rijn (1995), London (1998), Haarlem (1998), Dieren (1998, 2007), Neckar Open in Deizisau (1999), Lisbon (2000), Bussum (2005), Bad Zwesten (2006), Leiden (2007, 2008).

Erik van den Doel played for Netherlands in the Chess Olympiads:

- In 1998, at fourth board in the 33rd Chess Olympiad in Elista (+4, =3, -1),
- In 2002, at fourth board in the 35th Chess Olympiad in Bled (+5, =0, -4),
- In 2004, at first reserve board in the 36th Chess Olympiad in Calvià (+3, =3, -2),
- In 2006, at first reserve board in the 37th Chess Olympiad in Turin (+1, =3, -1).

Erik van den Doel played for Netherlands in the European Team Chess Championships:

- In 2001, at fourth board in the 13th European Team Chess Championship in León (+3, =1, -1) and won team gold and individual bronze medal,
- In 2003, at third board in the 14th European Team Chess Championship in Plovdiv (+1, =3, -2),
- In 2005, at reserve board in the 15th European Team Chess Championship in Gothenburg (+1, =4, -0) and won team gold medal,
- In 2007, at fourth board in the 16th European Team Chess Championship in Heraklion (+1, =4, -1).

In 1998, he was awarded the FIDE Grandmaster (GM) title.
