= Heinz Liebert =

German chess player (born 1936)

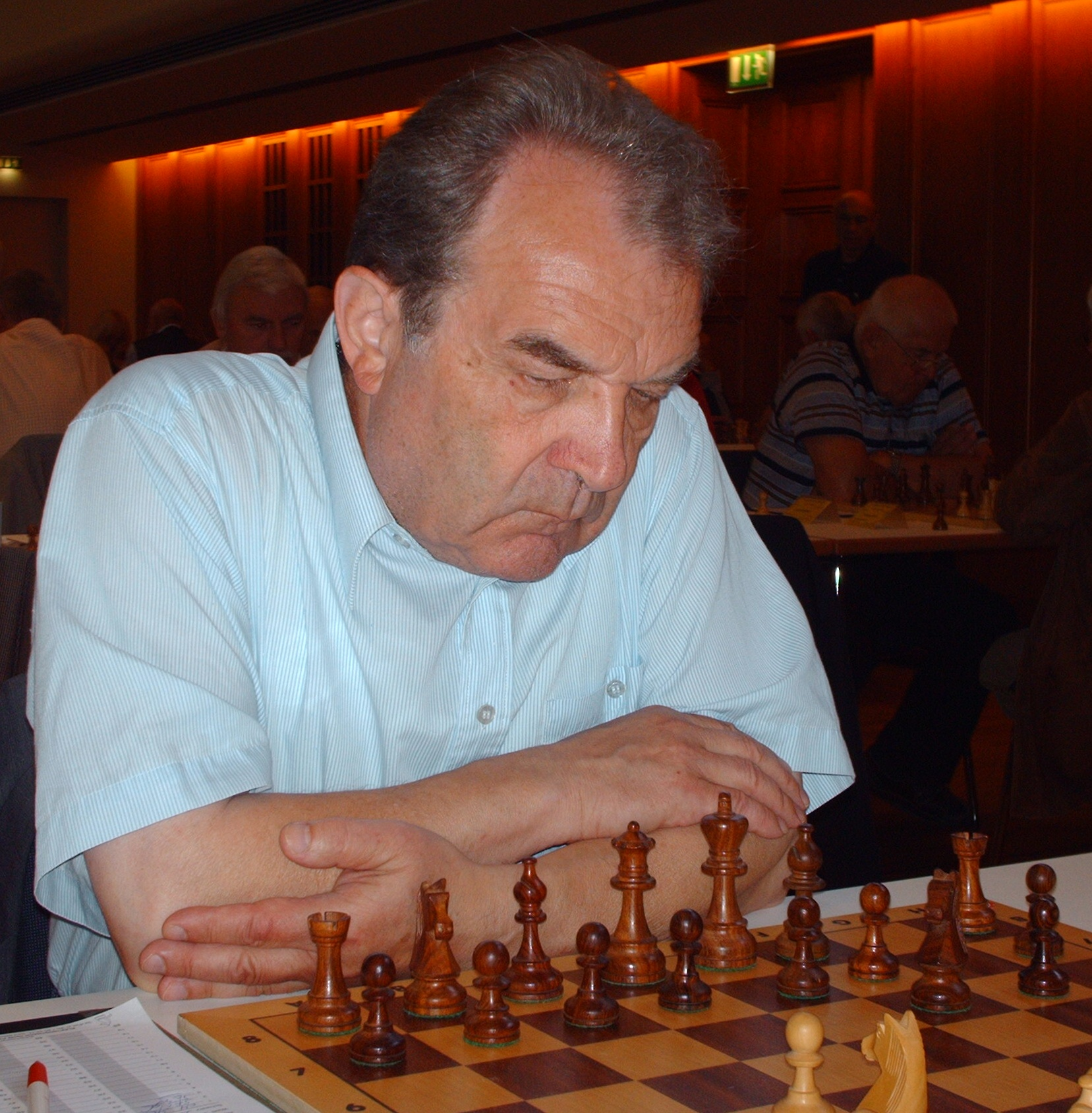
- Heinz Liebert in 2008

Personal information
- Born: 24 May 1936 (age 90) Krotoszyn County, Poland

Chess career
- Country: Germany
- Title: International Master (1966)
- Peak rating: 2485 (July 1973)

Heinz Liebert (born 24 May 1936) is a German chess International Master (IM) (1966), Chess Olympiad individual medalist (1968), European Team Chess Championship team and individual medalist (1970).

== Biography ==
Heinz Liebert eighteen times participated in East Germany Chess Championships, where he won 4 medals: 2 silver (1964, 1970) and 2 bronze (1971, 1977). In 1956, he won an international chess tournament in Ulaanbaatar. In 1966 Heinz Liebert shared second place with Levente Lengyel in Rubinstein Memorial behind only former World Champion Vasily Smyslov. In 1966, he was awarded the FIDE International Master (IM) title.

Heinz Liebert played for East Germany in the Chess Olympiads:

- In 1962, at second reserve board in the 15th Chess Olympiad in Varna (+3, =3, -2),
- In 1964, at third board in the 16th Chess Olympiad in Tel Aviv (+2, =3, -3),
- In 1966, at second reserve board in the 17th Chess Olympiad in Havana (+2, =2, -2),
- In 1968, at first reserve board in the 18th Chess Olympiad in Lugano (+6, =6, -0) and won individual bronze medal,
- In 1970, at third board in the 19th Chess Olympiad in Siegen (+5, =5, -3),
- In 1972, at fourth board in the 20th Chess Olympiad in Skopje (+3, =5, -3).

Heinz Liebert played for East Germany in the European Team Chess Championship:

- * In 1970, at fifth board in the 4th European Team Chess Championship in Kapfenberg (+4, =1, -2), and won team bronze medal and individual silver medal.

Heinz Liebert played for East Germany in the World Student Team Chess Championships:

- In 1956, at third board in the 3rd World Student Team Chess Championship in Uppsala (+4, =2, -1),
- In 1957, at third board in the 4th World Student Team Chess Championship in Reykjavík (+5, =4, -4) and won team bronze medal,
- In 1960, at first reserve board in the 7th World Student Team Chess Championship in Leningrad (+3, =3, -0).

Heinz Liebert was mathematician by education. He was married to a German chess player Ursula Liebert (1933-1998).
