= Levente Lengyel =

Hungarian chess grandmaster (1933–2014)

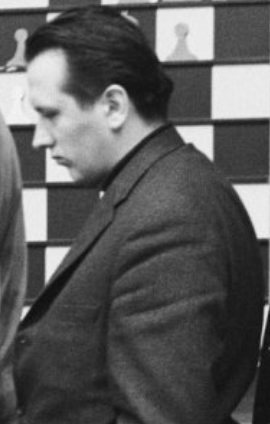
- Lengyel (Hoogovens 1964)

Personal information
- Born: 13 June 1933 Debrecen, Hungary
- Died: 18 August 2014 (aged 81) Budapest, Hungary

Chess career
- Country: Hungary
- Title: Grandmaster (1964)
- Peak rating: 2485 (July 1971)
- Peak ranking: No. 96 (July 1971)

Levente Lengyel (13 June 1933 – 18 August 2014) was a Hungarian chess player, who gained the Grandmaster title in 1964.

== Background ==
Lengyel gained the title of International Master in 1962 and became a Grandmaster in 1964. His final published rating from the international chess federation FIDE was 2293, although he had not been active for a number of years. At his peak, he was regarded as a strong grandmaster, competing for his nation at the top level and winning medals. He died in Budapest in 2014.

== Notable team results ==
Lengyel played for Hungary in six Olympiads between 1960 and 1970. His most notable results were:

- 15th Chess Olympiad 1962 Varna - Lengyel scored 8½/12 receiving an individual bronze medal, and Hungary finished 5th of 37 teams.
- 17th Chess Olympiad 1966 Havana - Lengyel scored 4/10 and Hungary finished 3rd of 52 teams, receiving bronze medals
- 19th Chess Olympiad 1970 Siegen - Lengyel scored 5½/12 and Hungary finished 2nd of 60 teams, receiving silver medals

His overall Olympiad record was 41 points from 70 games.

Lengyel also played in the European Team Chess Championship three times between 1961 and 1970. His results were as follows:

- 2nd European Team Championship 1961 Oberhausen - Lengyel scored 5½/10 and Hungary finished 3rd receiving bronze medals.
- 3rd European Team Championship 1965 Hamburg - Lengyel scored 5½/10 receiving an individual bronze medal. Hungary also finished 3rd for team bronze.
- 4th European Team Championship 1970 Kapfenberg - Lengyel scored 3½/7. Hungary finished 2nd receiving silver medals.

== Notable individual results ==
- 1962 Hungarian Championship (Budapest) 1st= (lost to Lajos Portisch in a playoff)
- 1963 Enschede Zonal 2nd= (with Klaus Darga, behind Svetozar Gligoric)
- 1964 Hungarian Championship (Budapest) 3rd= (behind Portisch)
- 1964 Málaga 2nd= 7½/11 (with Portisch, winner Arturo Pomar 8½)
- 1966 Polanica Zdroj Rubinstein Memorial 2nd= 9/14 (with Heinz Liebert, behind Vasily Smyslov 11)
- 1968 Solingen 1st (ahead of Bruno Parma, Ludek Pachman, Laszlo Szabo and Jan Hein Donner)
- 1972 Bari 1st
- 1972-73 Reggio Emilia 1st= 7/11 (with Luben Popov)
- 1977 Budapest 1st
- 1977 Virovitica 1st
- 1977-78 Gausdal 1st
- 1980 Val Thorens 1st
- 1982 Val Thorens 1st= (with Miodrag Todorcevic)

Lengyel also played in the 1964 Amsterdam Interzonal, a preliminary round of the World Chess Championship, achieving 12th place with 13/23, 1.5 points short of qualifying for the candidates matches (the winner was Smyslov with 17).

== Notable games ==
Portisch - Lengyel,
Málaga 1964

Position: e3 white pawn, f4 white pawn, d4 white pawn, g5 white king, d5 black pawn, g6 white queen, d7 black queen, h8 black king

after 52. f4
Darga - Lengyel,
Amsterdam 1964

Position: e1 black rook, f2 white king, e2 black rook, c2 white rook, b2 white pawn, f3 white pawn, d3 white rook, a3 white pawn, h4 white pawn, f4 white pawn, g6 black pawn, f6 black bishop, b6 black pawn, h7 black pawn, a7 black pawn, g8 black king

after 41... R6xe2+

Lengyel had wins against former World Champion Mikhail Botvinnik, but perhaps his two most memorable results were two games which finished in somewhat unorthodox fashion:

Portisch - Lengyel, Málaga 1964, where he achieved a stalemate draw with a spectacular queen sacrifice.

In the left-hand board position (after 52. f4) Lengyel played 52... Qg4+! 53. Kh6 (53. Kxg4 is stalemate and 53. Kf6 is met by 53... Qe6+ with stalemate if the queen is taken, otherwise the game will end in perpetual check) Qg5+!! after which any of the three captures of the queen leads to stalemate.

Darga - Lengyel, Amsterdam 1964, where Darga resigned in a clearly winning position.

In the right-hand board position (after 41... R6xe2+) Darga played 42. Resigns??, instead of 42. Rxe2 Bxh4+ 43. Ke3 where White should win with his additional material. It appears that both players missed that 43. Ke3 would be possible.
