= László Hazai =

Hungarian chess player (born 1953)

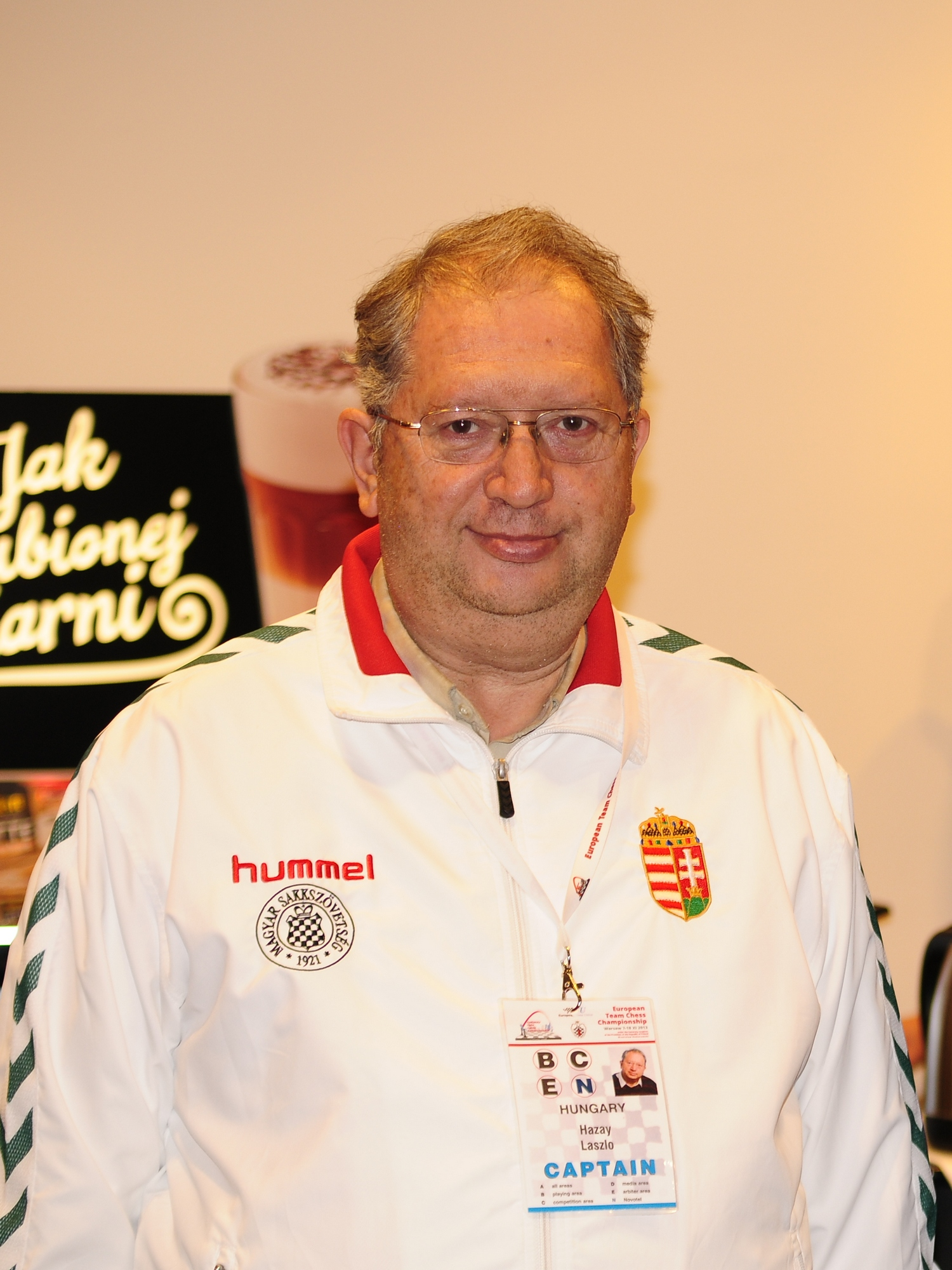
- László Hazai in 2013 in Warsaw

Personal information
- Born: 14 June 1953 (age 73) Budapest, Hungary

Chess career
- Country: Hungary
- Title: International Master (1977)
- FIDE rating: 2413 (July 2026)
- Peak rating: 2480 (January 1985)

László Hazai (born 14 June 1953) is a Hungarian chess International Master (1977). He is a European Team Chess Championship two times silver medalist (1977, 1980).

== Biography ==
From the mid-1970s to the mid-1980s László Hazai was one of the top Hungarian chess players. He competed many times in the finals of the individual Hungarian Chess Championships, winning medals three times: silver in 1986, and bronze in 1979 and 1980.

László Hazai achievements in international chess tournaments include: shared 1st place in Ősagárd (1976, together with Valentin Stoica), 2nd place in Sofia (1979, after Ján Plachetka), 2nd place in Kecskemét (1983, after Gennadi Zaichik), 1st place in Maribor (1985, Vasja Pirc memorial), 3rd place in Vrnjačka Banja (1985, after Milan Matulović and Péter Lukács), 1st place in Espoo (1988) and 1st place in Helsinki (1989, together with Antti Pyhälä).

László Hazai played for Hungary in the European Team Chess Championships:

- In 1977, at second reserve board in the 6th European Team Chess Championship in Moscow (+0, =1, -0) and won team silver medal,
- In 1980, at second reserve board in the 7th European Team Chess Championship in Skara (+0, =1, -1) and won team silver medal.

László Hazai played for Hungary in the World Student Team Chess Championships:

- In 1974, at fourth board in the 20th World Student Team Chess Championship in Teesside (+2, =3, -0) and won team bronze medal.

László Hazai played for chess club Honved Budapest in the European Men's Chess Club Cups:

- In 1984, in the 4th European Chess Club Cup (+1, =3, -0),
- In 1988, in the 6th European Chess Club Cup (+2, =2, -2) and won team silver medal.

In 1977, László Hazai was awarded the FIDE International Master (IM) title and received the FIDE Senior Trainer title in 2011. He reached his career highest chess ranking on January 1, 1985, with a score of 2,480 points, then 8th-10th place among Hungarian chess players.
