= Bozhena Piddubna =

Ukrainian chess player (born 2009)

Personal information
- Born: 27 March 2009 (age 17) Kyiv, Ukraine

Chess career
- Country: Ukraine
- Title: Woman International Master (2025)
- Peak rating: 2302 (November 2025)

Bozhena Piddubna (Ukrainian: Божена Піддубна; born 27 March 2009) is a Ukrainian chess player who holds the title of Woman FIDE Master (2024). European Women's Team Chess Championship medalist (2025).

== Biography ==
Bozhena Piddubna is student of Kyiv chess school. She won medals in the Ukrainian Girls' Chess Championships: silver in the G14 age group (2023, 2024) and bronze in G12 age group (2021). She has represented Ukraine several times at the European Youth Chess Championships and World Youth Chess Championships.

In 2023 Bozhena Piddubna won Ukrainian Women's Rapid Chess Championship and finished 2nd in Ukrainian Women's Blitz Chess Championship.

In September 2025 in Kyiv, she won Qualifying tournament to clarify the Ukrainian team member for the European Women's Team Chess Championship.

Bozhena Piddubna played for Ukraine in the European Women's Team Chess Championship:

- In 2025, at reserve board in the 16th European Team Chess Championship (women) in Batumi (+5, =2, -1) and won team and individual silver medals.
