= László Navarovszky =

Hungarian chess player (1933–1996)

Personal information
- Born: 3 April 1933 Budapest, Hungary
- Died: 17 January 1996 (aged 62) Budapest, Hungary

Chess career
- Country: Hungary
- Title: International Master (1965)
- Peak rating: 2415 (May 1974)

László Navarovszky (4 April 1933 – 17 January 1996) was a Hungarian chess International Master (IM, 1965). He was European Team Chess Championship two-times bronze (1961, 1965) medalist.

== Biography ==
László Navarovszky started playing in chess tournaments from 1945. In 1951 after Hungarian Chess Championship he awarded National Chess Master title. In 1965, László Navarovszky was awarded the FIDE International Master (IM) title.

László Navarovszky played for Hungary in the European Team Chess Championships:

- In 1961, at second reserve board in the 2nd European Team Chess in Oberhausen (+0, =1, -0) and won team bronze medal,
- In 1965, at second reserve board in the 3rd European Team Chess Championship in Hamburg (+1, =4, -1) and won team bronze and individual silver medals.

László Navarovszky played for Hungary in the World Student Team Chess Championships:

- In 1955, at fourth board in the 2nd World Student Team Chess Championship in Lyon (+6, =5, -0) and won team bronze medal,
- In 1956, at first reserve board in the 3rd World Student Team Chess Championship in Uppsala (+2, =2, -0) and won team silver medal,
- In 1957, at fourth board in the 4th World Student Team Chess Championship in Reykjavík (+3, =3, -1),
- In 1959, at second reserve board in the 6th World Student Team Chess Championship in Budapest (+4, =5, -0) and won team bronze medal.

László Navarovszky was President of the Hungarian Chess Federation from 1968 to 1979. He was captain of the Hungarian Olympic chess team in 21st Chess Olympiad (Nice, 1974) and in 23rd Chess Olympiad (Buenos Aires, 1978). In 1978 Hungarian Olympic chess team won the gold medal. László Navarovszky was also the Hungarian chess team captain in 6th European Team Chess Championship (Moscow, 1977).
