= Krunoslav Hulak =

Croatian chess grandmaster (1951–2015)

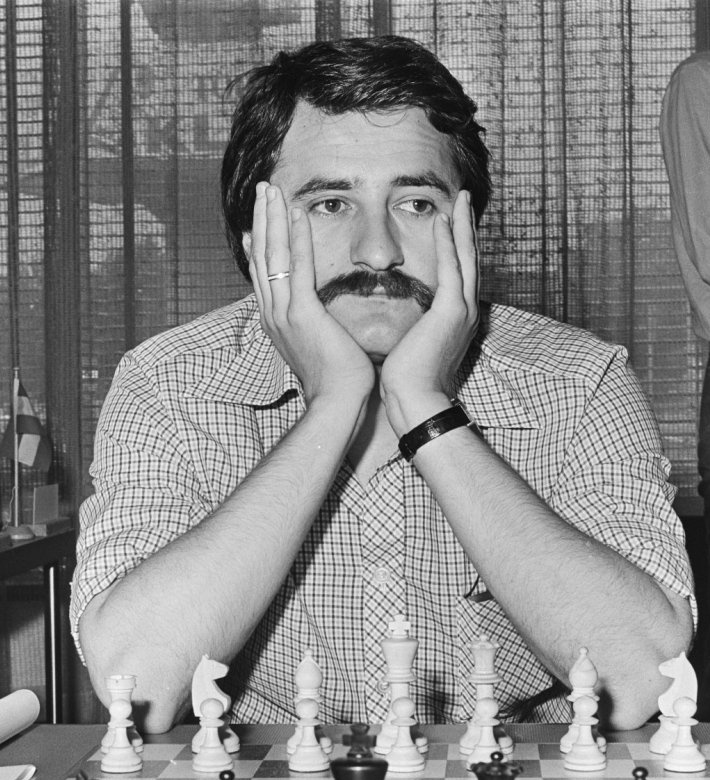
- Krunoslav Hulak in 1977

Personal information
- Born: 25 May 1951 Osijek, SFR Yugoslavia
- Died: 23 October 2015 (aged 64) Zagreb, Croatia

Chess career
- Country: Yugoslavia → Croatia
- Title: Grandmaster (1976)
- Peak rating: 2570 (October 2002)

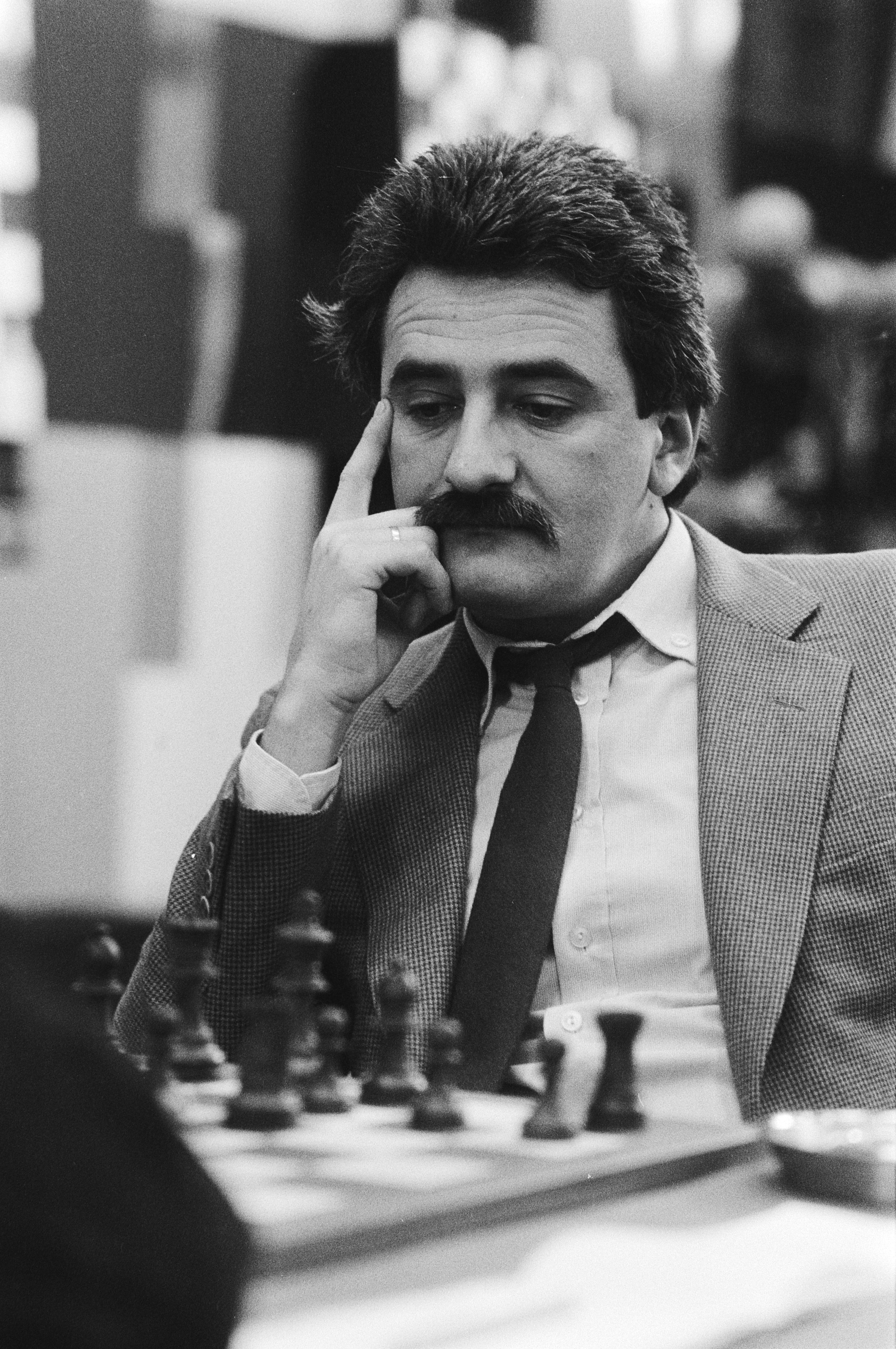
Krunoslav Hulak, 1983

Krunoslav Hulak (25 May 1951 – 23 October 2015) was a Yugoslav and later Croatian chess grandmaster. He was awarded the International Master title in 1974, and the grandmaster title in 1976 by FIDE.

== Career ==
Hulak won the Yugoslav Chess Championship in 1976 and the Croatian Chess Championship in 2005.

His other notable tournament performances have been:

- Varna 1974 equal 1st
- Lublin 1976 equal 2nd
- Amsterdam IBM tournament 1977 2nd
- Osijek 1980 equal 1st
- Sombor 1980 equal 1st
- Budva 1981 2nd
- Banja Luka 1983 equal 1st
- Zagreb 1985 2nd
- Wijk aan Zee-B 1986 1st
- Banja Luka 1987 equal 1st
- Solin 2000 2nd

He played twice in the interzonal tournaments, finishing 11th at Toluca 1982 and 12th at Zagreb 1987.

Hulak played thrice for Yugoslavia (1982, 1986, 1990) and thrice for Croatia (1992, 1994, 1996) in the Chess Olympiad.
