= Karoly Honfi =

Hungarian chess player

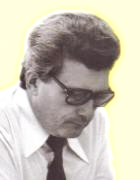
- Károly Honfi, c. 1980s

Personal information
- Born: October 25, 1930 Budapest, Hungary
- Died: August 14, 1996 (aged 65) Budapest, Hungary

Chess career
- Country: Hungary
- Title: Grandmaster (posthumous, 1996)
- Peak rating: 2470 (May 1974)

Károly Honfi ([ˈhoɱfi ˈkaːroj]; October 25, 1930 – August 14, 1996) was a Hungarian chess player who held the chess title of International Master. Honfi was posthumously awarded the title of Honorary Grandmaster.

== Biography ==
Honfi was born in Budapest on October 25, 1930. His father was also a successful chess player. He was the vice champion of Hungary in 1958, and became an International Master in 1962. He earned the Correspondence Chess International Master title in 1991.
