= Vlatko Kovačević =

Croatian and Yugoslavian chess player

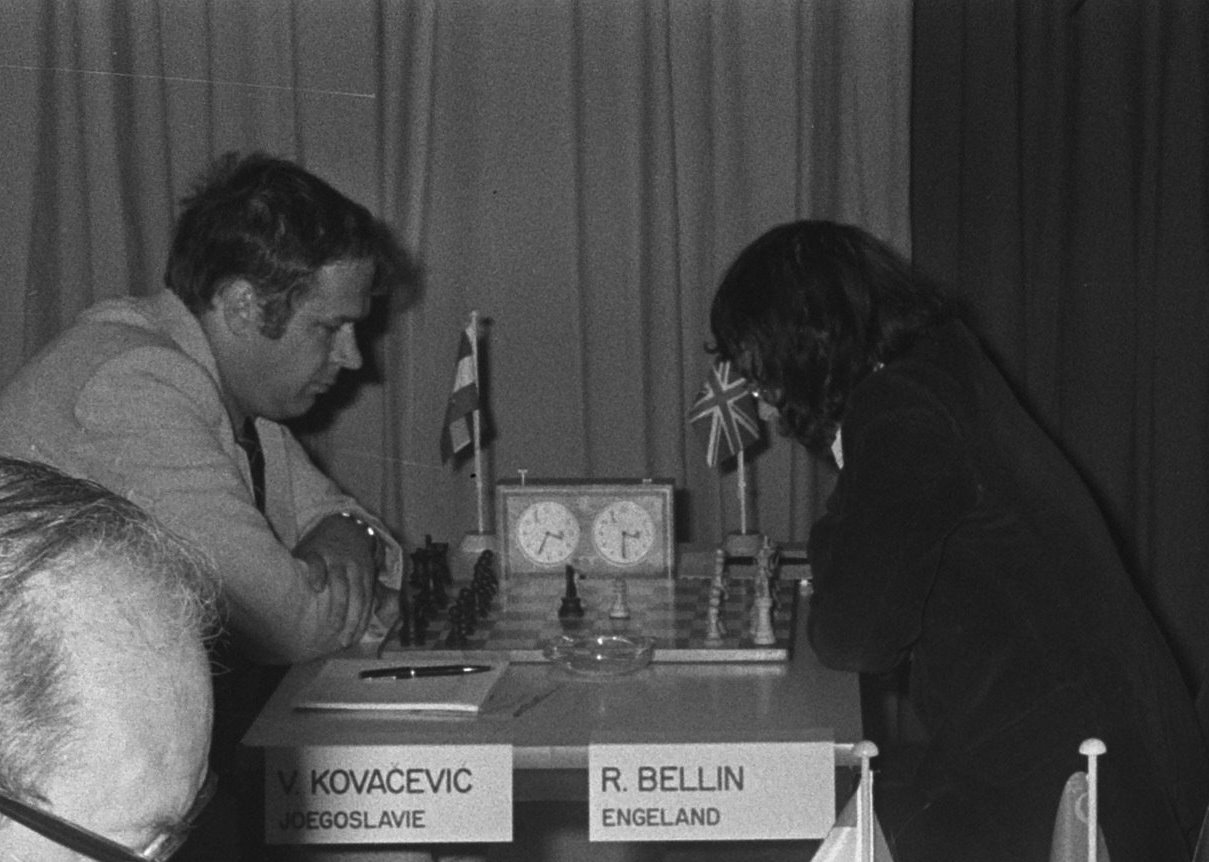
- Kovačević (left) vs. Robert Bellin (right) (1973)

Personal information
- Born: 26 March 1942 (age 84)

Chess career
- Country: Yugoslavia (1943–1992); Croatia (1991–)
- Title: Grandmaster (1977)
- FIDE rating: 2466 (July 2026)
- Peak rating: 2514 (January 2009)

Vlatko Kovačević (born 26 March 1942 in Dubrovnik) is a Croatian chess grandmaster.

== Biography ==
In 1970, Vlatko Kovačević tied for 9th–11th in Rovinj–Zagreb (Bobby Fischer won), but beat Fischer in their individual game. In 1975, he tied for 2nd–4th in Rovinj–Zagreb (Gyula Sax won). In 1976, he won in Sombor. In 1976, he tied for 1st–3rd in Virovitica. In 1977, he tied for 1st–3rd in Karlovac. In 1979, he won in Zagreb. In 1979, he won in Virovitica. In 1980, he tied for 2nd–3rd in Virovitica. In 1980, he won in Maribor. In 1981, he won in Tuzla. In 1981, he tied for 2nd–6th in Ramsgate. In 1982, he won in Vinkovci. In 1982/83, he took 2nd in Hastings where (Rafael Vaganian won). In 1986, he tied for 2nd–3rd, behind Jaime Sunye Neto, in Zenica. In 1986, he won in Zagreb.

Kovacevic played in six Chess Olympiads. They were: for Yugoslavia at Lucerne 1982, Thessaloniki 1984, and Thessaloniki 1988, for Yugoslavia "B" at Novi Sad 1990, for Croatia at Manila 1992 and Elista 1998. He won the individual bronze medal at the fourth board in Novi Sad.

FIDE awarded him the International Grandmaster title in 1976.
