= Győző Forintos =

Hungarian chess grandmaster (1935–2018)

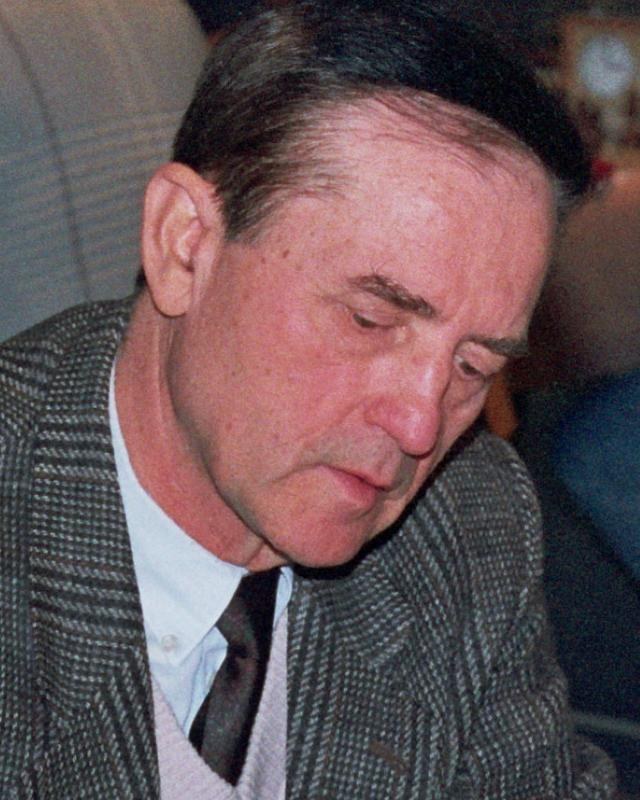
- Forintos at Bad Liebenzell, 1996

Personal information
- Born: Győző Victor Forintos; 30 July 1935 Budapest, Hungary
- Died: 5 December 2018 (aged 83) Budapest, Hungary

Chess career
- Country: Hungary
- Title: Grandmaster (1974)
- Peak rating: 2495 (July 1972)
- Peak ranking: No. 77 (July 1972)

Győző Victor Forintos (30 July 1935 – 5 December 2018) was a Hungarian chess player and by profession, an economist. He was awarded the titles International Master, in 1963, and Grandmaster, in 1974, by FIDE.

He first participated in the Hungarian championship as early as 1954 and became the national champion in 1968/9.

In tournaments he was 1st at Reggio Emilia 1962/3, 2nd at Wijk aan Zee-B 1970 (after Andersson), 1st at Baja (Asztalos Memorial) 1971, 3rd at Caorle 1972, 2nd at Vrnjačka Banja 1973, 2nd at Reykjavík 1974 (after Smyslov, but ahead of Bronstein), 2nd at Novi Sad 1974, 2nd= at Lone Pine 1976 (after Petrosian), 2nd at Sarajevo 1978, and 1st= at the Perpignan Open 1987.

He played for Hungary in six Chess Olympiads (1958, 1964, 1966, 1970, 1972, and 1974). In 1958, he took an individual gold medal for his 80% score and has also won silver and bronze team medals.

As a writer on chess, he has produced two books on the opening in the English language, both co-authored by Ervin Haág: Petroff Defence, MacMillan Chess Library, 1992 and Easy Guide to the 5.Nge2 King's Indian, Everyman, 2000. The latter describes a fairly offbeat method of playing white against the King's Indian. Sometimes referred to as the 'Hungarian Attack', it is a system that Forintos has himself developed and become a leading expert on.

His daughter Gyöngyvér, also a chess player, was married to the Anglo-French grandmaster, Anthony Kosten.

== Notable games ==
- Gyozo V Forintos vs Vasily Tomovic, Belgrade 1957, Formation: King's Indian Attack (A07), 1-0
- Gyozo V Forintos vs Vasily Smyslov, Sochi 1974, Nimzo-Indian Defense: Classical, Berlin Variation Pirc Variation (E39), 1-0
