= John Littlewood (chess player) =

English chess player (1931–2009)

Personal information
- Born: May 25, 1931 Sheffield, Yorkshire
- Died: September 16, 2009 (aged 78)

Chess career
- Country: England
- Peak rating: 2395 (January 1980)

John Eric Littlewood (25 May 1931 – 16 September 2009) was an English chess player. For many years, he was a leading British player and took the title of national senior champion in 2006. Perhaps his most famous game was the one he lost against the world champion Mikhail Botvinnik at the Hastings International Chess Congress 1961/2. Littlewood launched a fearsome attack which Botvinnik was able to defend only by means of a tactical finesse. Botvinnik chose to include the game in his autobiographical Best Games 1947–1970.

== Early life and education ==
John Littlewood was born in Sheffield, Yorkshire in 1931, the fourth of his eleven siblings. He did not start playing chess until he was 13, when he was introduced to the game by a friend. He kept on losing to his friend, so he went into the school library and checked out every single chess book. He then read a lot of chess tactics, and eventually beat his friend.

At 16 he had improved and joined the local chess club. As he had not played that many people, he was surprised when he found he could beat everyone in the club. At this point he became very keen on the game. While at Sheffield University, Littlewood won three university tournaments and the Sheffield Championship.

== Career ==
After university he entered national service, where he taught reading and writing to soldiers. Because of this he did not have the opportunity to play chess for two years.

Littlewood – Botvinnik (1961)

Position: a8 black rook, d8 black queen, f8 black rook, g8 black king, b7 black bishop, d7 black knight, e7 black pawn, f7 black pawn, h7 black pawn, a6 black pawn, g6 white pawn, h6 white queen, e5 black pawn, d4 white knight, b3 white pawn, c3 black pawn, f3 white pawn, a2 white pawn, b2 white pawn, g2 white pawn, b1 white king, d1 white rook, h1 white rook

After sacrificing a piece, Littlewood (white) seemed to have a winning attack, threatening mate on h7 and also Nf5, after which g7 would be unprotectable. But with 19... Nf6! Botvinnik defended against both, as 20. Nf5 is countered by 20... c2+! 21. Kxc2 Qc8+, winning the Knight. White had shot his bolts and lost quickly.

After national service he worked as a French teacher in Lincolnshire, at Skegness Grammar School from 1955 to 1967. His first big break was when he was invited to the British Chess Championship in York. He competed well for his first time and was nicknamed 'the Lincolnshire poacher', a name he protested because he was born in Sheffield.

After his good performance in York, he was invited to participate in the prestigious Hastings tournament and played his famous game against Mikhail Botvinnik, the World Champion at the time. Littlewood started with a promising attack, but he missed an important resource. This enabled Botvinnik to turn the game around and defeat him. Botvinnik includes this game in his autobiographical "Best Games 1947–1970”.

At Hastings, Littlewood also played the American grandmaster Arthur Bisguier, who he beat in 23 moves. After the match his opponent said "What do they feed this guy on? Raw meat?"

Later, Littlewood played at two Olympiads, several Anglo-Dutch matches, and European and World Seniors. He was proud to have defeated the German grandmaster Wolfgang Uhlmann on two occasions. Aside from playing the game, he also managed the national blind chess team. At one stage, he was the Director of Junior Chess.

John Littlewood was the outright winner of the British Senior Chess Championship in 2006 and finished equal first in 2008, when the contest was held at Liverpool's St. George's Hall. To be eligible to compete, participants must be sixty and above; he was seventy-seven on this second occasion and one of the oldest players taking part.

He had his own chess column called "Littlewood's Choice", printed once a month in the English Chess Federation magazine.

== Family and personal life ==
His brother Norman also played in two Olympiads, and his son Paul, an International Master, won the British Chess Championship in 1981.

Littlewood lived in Skelmersdale, Lancashire, and had seven children and eight grandchildren.
