= László Vadász =

Hungarian chess grandmaster (1948–2005)

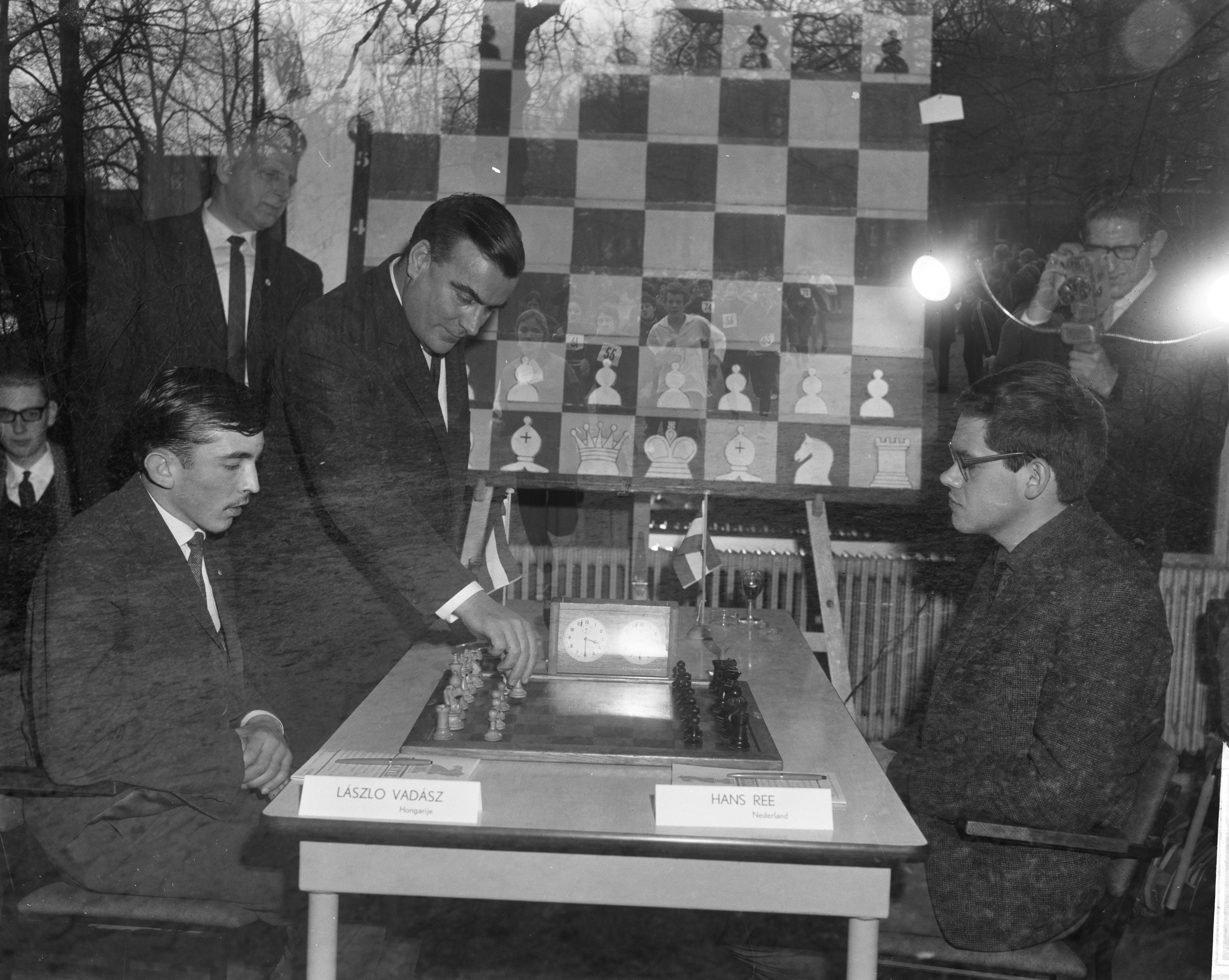
- Vadász vs. Hans Ree (1965)

Personal information
- Born: January 27, 1948 Kiskunfélegyháza
- Died: January 3, 2005 (aged 56)

Chess career
- Country: Hungary
- Title: Grandmaster (1976)
- Peak rating: 2505 (January 1978)
- Peak ranking: No. 89 (January 1978)

László Vadász (January 27, 1948, in Kiskunfélegyháza – January 3, 2005) was a Hungarian chess player who held the FIDE title of Grandmaster (GM). He was one of the strongest Hungarian players in the 1970s. In 1978 Vadász played as second reserve in the victorious Hungarian team in the Chess Olympiad of 1978, held in Buenos Aires. In 1980's his play tended to decline dramatically. His last Elo was 2271, but he was considered inactive as he did not play any Elo-rated game after the 2000/01 Hungarian Championship. Vadász reached his highest Elo number in 2505 in January 1978.
