= Iván Faragó =

Hungarian chess player (1946–2022)

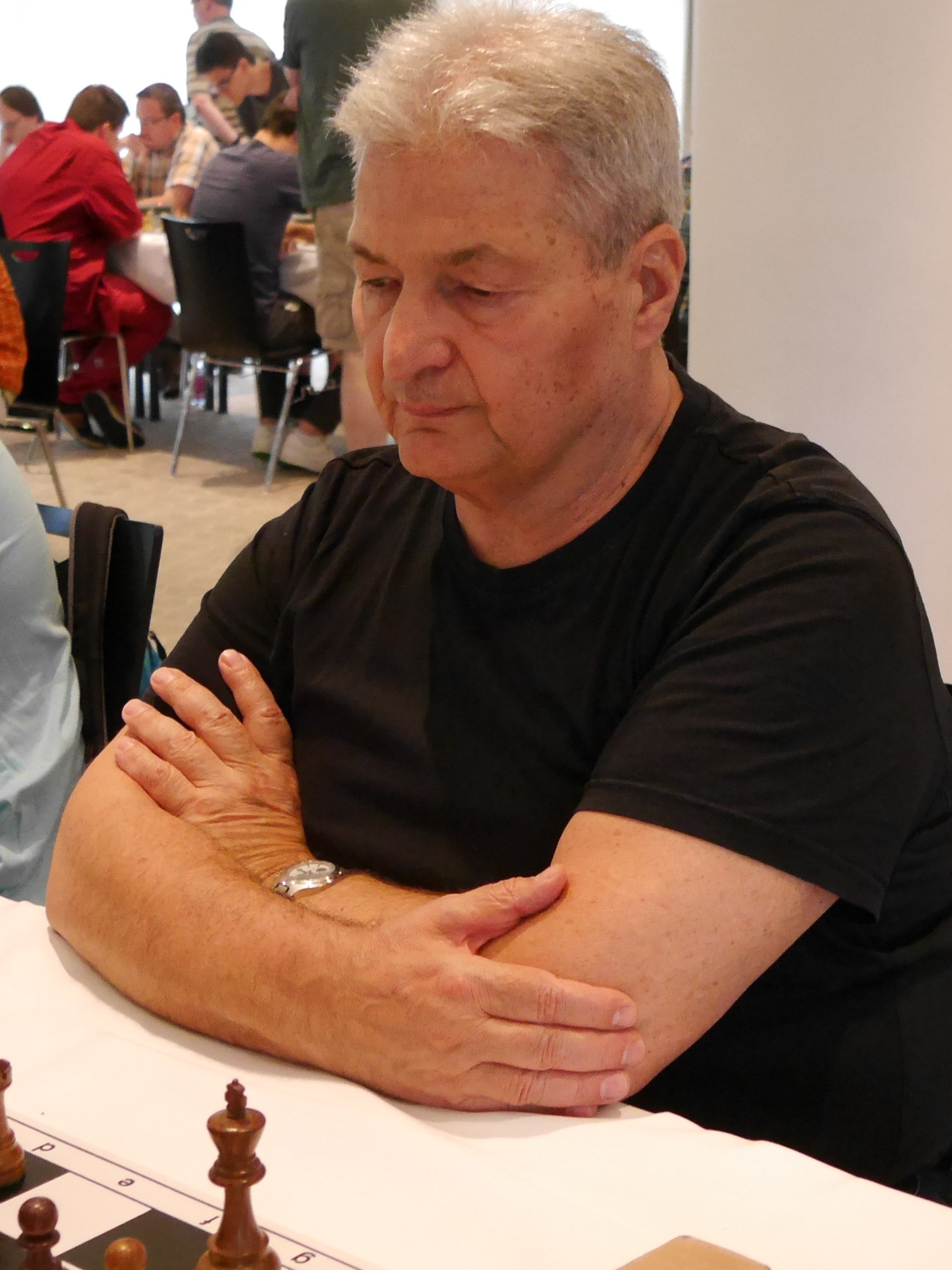
- Faragó in 2016

Personal information
- Born: 1 April 1946 Budapest, Hungary
- Died: 12 December 2022 (aged 76)

Chess career
- Country: Hungary
- Title: Grandmaster (1976)
- Peak rating: 2540 (July 1993)
- Peak ranking: No. 44 (January 1981)

Iván Faragó (1 April 1946 – 12 December 2022) was a Hungarian chess grandmaster. He was awarded the grandmaster title in 1976, won the Hungarian championship in 1986 and was an active player for over fifty years. He played in the German Bundesliga, where he represented the Griesheim chess club. He was born in Budapest.
