= Josif Dorfman =

French chess grandmaster (born 1952)

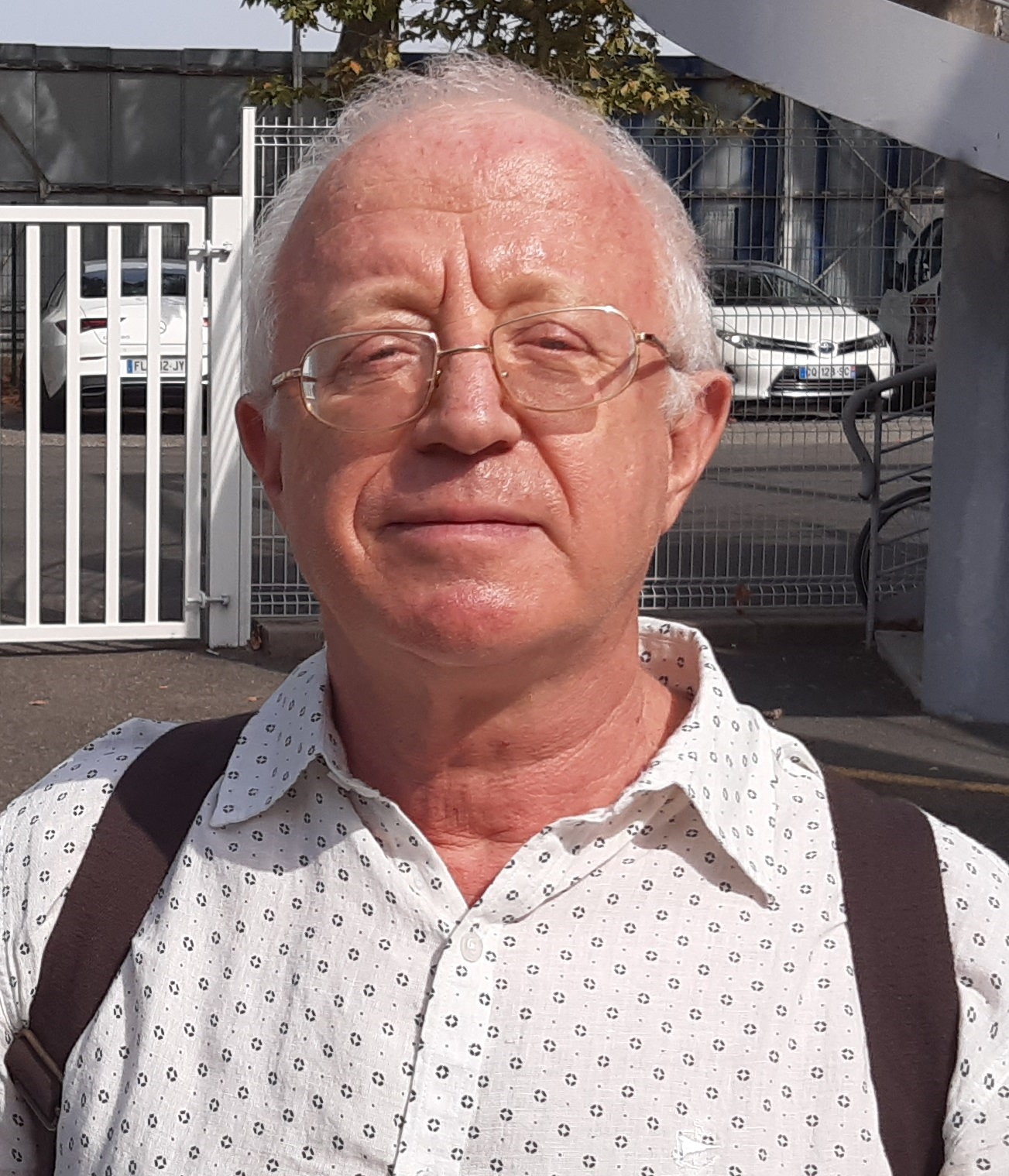
- Dorfman in 2022

Personal information
- Born: 1 May 1952 (age 74) Zhytomyr, Ukrainian SSR, Soviet Union

Chess career
- Country: Soviet Union (before 1991); France (after 1991)
- Title: Grandmaster (1978)
- FIDE rating: 2531 (November 2026)
- Peak rating: 2617 (July 2002)
- Peak ranking: No. 13 (January 1979)

Josif Davidovich Dorfman (also spelled Josef, Iossif, Iosif; born 1 May 1952) is a Soviet-French chess Grandmaster, coach and chess writer.

== Tournament results ==
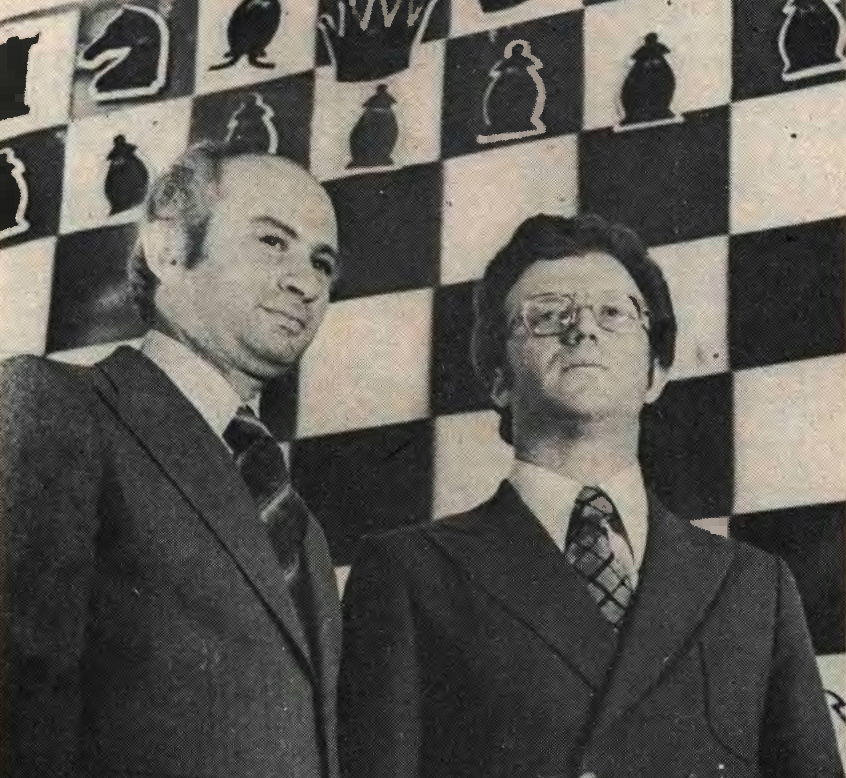
Boris Gulko & Josif Dorfman (1977)

Dorfman played in several USSR championships. In 1975, he took thirteenth in Yerevan (43rd URS-ch; Tigran Petrosian won). In 1976, he finished fifth in Moscow in the 44th Soviet championship as Anatoly Karpov won by a full point over Yuri Balashov. One of his most emphatic victories occurred in qualification for this championship, at the 1976 First League tournament, where he finished 1½ points clear of the field (+6 =11). In 1977, he was joint USSR Champion with Boris Gulko (both +4 =11, ahead of Petrosian, Polugaevsky and Tal). The subsequent play-off match was drawn (+1 –1 =4). In 1978, Dorfman shared thirteenth in Tbilisi as Tal won. In 1981, he tied for 8-9th in Frunze; Lev Psakhis and Garry Kasparov won). In 1984, he took 12th in Lviv (51st URS-ch; Andrei Sokolov won).

In international tournaments, Dorfman tied for second at Pécs 1976, finished second to Smyslov at São Paulo 1978, tied for second at Polanica-Zdrój 1978, one-half point behind Mikhail Tseitlin, 1st-3rd at Djakarta 1979, 3rd-5th at Manila 1979. He won at Zamardi 1980. He was a winner at Warsaw 1983 (+6, =8), was 1st= at Lviv 1984, 1st at Moscow 1985, and 5th= at Minsk 1986.

In 1998, Dorfman won the French Chess Championship in Méribel (73rd FRA-ch). Two years later, he was runner-up to his former student, Bacrot.

He played for France in three Chess Olympiads.

- In 1998, at 2nd board in the 33rd Chess Olympiad in Elista (+3 –0 =6);
- In 2002, at 2nd board in the 35th Chess Olympiad in Bled (+1 –1 =8);
- In 2004, at 3rd board in the 36th Chess Olympiad in Calvià (+2 –0 =8).

Dorfman was awarded the IM title in 1977 and the GM title in 1978.

== Coach ==
He acted as one of Garry Kasparov's seconds in his first four World Championship matches against Anatoly Karpov. Later Dorfman moved to France. He coached the French player Étienne Bacrot from age nine to Grandmaster level, when he became France's and the world's youngest ever.

In 2004 Dorfman was awarded the title of FIDE Senior Trainer.

== Commentator ==
In April 2019, Dorfman joined chess24 as one of the site's commentators and coaches together with Laurent Fressinet and Jean-Baptiste Mullon.

== Books ==
- Dorfman, Iossif (2001). The Method in Chess. Sarl Game Mind. ISBN 978-2957289028.
- Dorfman, Iossif (2002). The Critical Moment. Sarl Game Mind. ISBN 978-2847350029.

== Notable games ==
- Petar Velikov vs Josif D Dorfman, Palma de Mallorca (GMA) 1989, Zukertort Opening: Kingside Fianchetto (A04), 0-1
- Josif D Dorfman vs Yuri Razuvaev, Elenite 1992, English Opening: King's English Variation, General (A20), 1-0
