= István Csom =

Hungarian chess grandmaster (1940–2021)

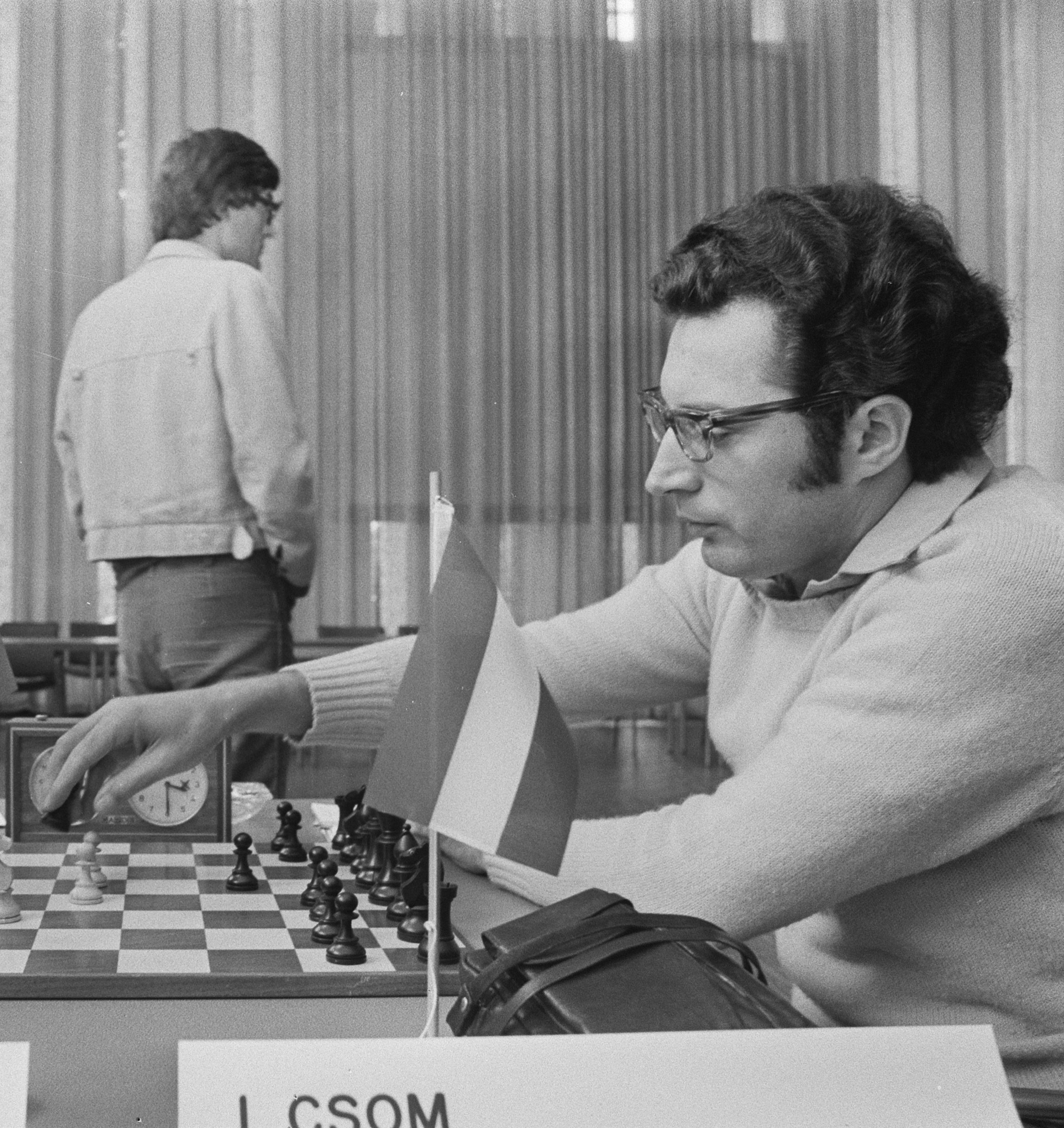
- István Csom (Amsterdam, 1974)

Personal information
- Born: 2 June 1940 Sátoraljaújhely, Hungary
- Died: 28 July 2021 (aged 81)

Chess career
- Country: Hungary
- Title: Grandmaster (1973)
- Peak rating: 2545 (January 1989)
- Peak ranking: No. 39 (May 1974)

István Csom (2 June 1940 – 28 July 2021) was a Hungarian chess player who held the FIDE titles of Grandmaster and International Arbiter. FIDE awarded him the International Master title in 1967 and the Grandmaster title in 1973. He was Hungarian Champion in 1972 and 1973 (jointly). His tournament victories include Olot 1973, Cleveland 1975, Olot 1975, Pula Zonal 1975, Berlin 1979, Copenhagen 1983, Järvenpää 1985 and Delhi 1987.

Csom was born in Sátoraljaújhely, Hungary. He played for the Hungarian team in seven Chess Olympiads (1968–1974, 1978–1982, 1986–1988), including the victorious team of 1978.

Over the course of his career, Csom defeated many top Grandmasters, including Ulf Andersson, Boris Gulko, Tony Miles, Lajos Portisch, Samuel Reshevsky, Nigel Short, former World Champion Mikhail Tal, Rafael Vaganian, and Artur Yusupov.
