= Péter Lukács (chess player) =

Hungarian chess grandmaster (born 1950)

Personal information
- Born: 9 July 1950 (age 76) Budapest, Hungary

Chess career
- Country: Hungary
- Title: Grandmaster (1986)
- FIDE rating: 2404 (July 2026)
- Peak rating: 2520 (July 1987)
- Peak ranking: No. 90 (July 1987)

Péter Lukács (born 9 July 1950) is a Hungarian chess Grandmaster (GM) (1986). He is a Hungarian Chess Championship winner (1980) and a European Team Chess Championship two-time silver medalist (1977, 1980).

== Biography ==
At the turn of 1970s and 1980s, Péter Lukács was one of the top Hungarian chess players. In 1980, he won the title of Hungarian Chess Champion, thanks to which two years later he appeared in the World Chess Championship Zonal tournament in Băile Herculane, sharing with Aleksander Sznapik, József Pintér and Florin Gheorghiu 4th place. He won his second national chess championship medal (silver) in 1989.

Péter Lukács greatest international chess tournament successes include victories in Pernik (1976), Helsinki (1983), Vrnjačka Banja (1985, with Milan Matulović), Polanica-Zdrój (1986, Akiba Rubinstein Memorial, together with Konstantin Lerner), Budapest (1987), Miskolc (1990), Montpellier (1991), Kecskemét (1991, together with Loek van Wely), Budapest (1994 with Ioannis Nikolaidis and 1999 with Hoang Thanh Trang) and 2nd place in Cienfuegos (1983, Tournament B Jose Raul Capablanca Memorial, for Jesús Nogueiras), Almada (1988, for Wolfgang Uhlmann, and with Julian Hodgson), Lillafüred (1989, after Michał Krasenkow) and Budapest (1993, after Peter Leko).

Péter Lukács played for Hungary in the European Team Chess Championships:

- In 1977, at first reserve board in the 6th European Team Chess Championship in Moscow (+2, =1, -0) and won team silver medal,
- In 1980, at first reserve board in the 7th European Team Chess Championship in Skara (+0, =4, -0) and won team silver medal,
- In 1992, at reserve board in the 10th European Team Chess Championship in Debrecen (+4, =1, -2).

Péter Lukács played for Hungary in the World Team Chess Championship:

- In 1989, at reserve board in the 2nd World Team Chess Championship in Lucerne (+0, =3, -1).

Péter Lukács played for chess club Spartacus Budapest in the European Men's Chess Club Cups:

- In 1979, in the 2nd European Chess Club Cup (+4, =2, -0),
- In 1982, in the 3rd European Chess Club Cup (+5, =2, -3) and won team tournament,
- In 1984, in the 4th European Chess Club Cup (+1, =3, -1),
- In 1986, in the 5th European Chess Club Cup (+0, =5, -1).

In 1976, Péter Lukács was awarded the FIDE International Master (IM) title and received the FIDE Grandmaster WGM) title ten years later. He reached his career highest chess ranking on July 1, 1987, with a score of 2,520 points, then split 90th-99th. place in the world FIDE list, while splitting 6th-7th place among Hungarian chess players.
