= Chess Bundesliga =

German team chess league

The term Chess Bundesliga (German: Schach-Bundesliga) normally refers to the premier league of team chess in Germany established in 1980. It is arguably the strongest league of its kind and attracts many high-rated grandmasters.

Austria also has a Bundesliga for chess, usually described as the Bundesliga OST (for Österreich).

== Format ==
Sixteen teams face each other in a single round robin format, each match-day team formed of eight players. The season runs between October and April. Team members may be male or female, but there is also a separate Bundesliga restricted to female players ("Frauen-Schach-Bundesliga"). Each playing weekend normally comprises two matches for each team, played on consecutive days.

Matches are arranged so that teams pair up as "travelling partners". Many of the titled professionals are paid an appearance fee and/or travel expenses.

== Season 2006/07 ==
Prior to the commencement of the season, reigning champions OSC Baden-Baden started as runaway favourites - their impressive squad was topped by Viswanathan Anand, Peter Svidler, Alexei Shirov, Étienne Bacrot, Magnus Carlsen, Liviu-Dieter Nisipeanu, Pentala Harikrishna and Francisco Vallejo Pons. GMs Peter Heine Nielsen, Sergei Movsesian and Michał Krasenkow were just three of the other players.

The closest threat to the champions were likely to be SG Porz, TSV Bindlach-Aktionar and Werder Bremen. OSC Baden-Baden successfully defended their title, whereas Werder Bremen faded badly after a good start and so a close fight developed for the remaining places. Unexpectedly, Hamburger SK confounded the ratings to take second place, its Polish contingent Radosław Wojtaszek and Robert Kempiński scoring heavily.

SG Porz and TSV Bindlach-Aktionar finished in third and fourth places respectively, with outstanding performances coming from Loek van Wely (also undefeated) for Porz and Vladimir Baklan and David Baramidze for Bindlach.

== Recent seasons ==
Teams finishing in the top four places in recent seasons were as follows:

- 2003/4 - 1. SG Porz | 2. SC Baden-Oos | 3. TV Tegernsee | 4. SV Werder Bremen
- 2004/5 - 1. SV Werder Bremen | 2. SG Porz | 3. OSC Baden-Baden | 4. TV Tegernsee
- 2005/6 - 1. OSC Baden-Baden | 2. Werder Bremen | 3. SG Porz | 4. SG Solingen
- 2006/7 - 1. OSC Baden-Baden | 2. Hamburger SK | 3. SG Porz | 4. Bindlach Aktionär
- 2007/8 - 1. OSC Baden-Baden | 2. Werder Bremen | 3. Mülheim | 4. Bindlach Aktionär
- 2008/9 - 1. OSG Baden-Baden | 2. SC Eppingen | 3. Werder Bremen | 4. Mülheim
- 2009/10 - 1. OSG Baden-Baden | 2. Werder Bremen | 3. SG Solingen | 4. Mülheim
- 2010/11 - 1. OSG Baden-Baden | 2. Werder Bremen | 3. SC Eppingen | 4. SG Solingen
- 2011/12 - 1. OSG Baden-Baden | 2. Werder Bremen | 3. SG Solingen | 4. SC Eppingen
- 2012/13 - 1. OSG Baden-Baden | 2. Mülheim | 3. SG Solingen | 4. SC Eppingen
- 2013/14 - 1. OSG Baden-Baden | 2. Mülheim | 3. SV Hockenheim | 4. SC Eppingen
- 2014/15 - 1. OSG Baden-Baden | 2. Werder Bremen | 3. SV Hockenheim | 4. SK Schwäbisch Hall
- 2015/16 - 1. SG Solingen | 2. OSG Baden-Baden | 3. Werder Bremen | 4. SK Schwäbisch Hall
- 2016/17 - 1. OSG Baden-Baden | 2. SV 1930 Hockenheim | 3. SG Solingen | 4. SK Schwaebisch Hall
- 2017/18 - 1. OSG Baden Baden | 2. SG Solingen | 3. SV Hockenheim | 4. SV Werder Bremen
- 2018/19 - 1. OSG Baden Baden | 2. SV Hockenheim | 3. SG Solingen | 4. SF Deizisau
- 2019/21- 1. OSG Baden Baden | 2. Schachfreunde Deizisau | 3. SV Hockenheim | 4. SG Solingen
- 2020 - 1. OSG Baden Baden | 2. SC Viernheim | 3. Schachfreunde Deizisau | 4. SV Werder Bremen
- 2021/22- 1. OSG Baden Baden | 2. SC Viernheim | 3. SG Solingen | 4. Schachfreunde Deizisau
- 2022/23- 1. OSG Baden Baden | 2. SC Viernheim | 3. Schachfreunde Deizisau | 4. SG Solingen

== See also ==
- 4NCL, the British-based Four Nations Chess League
