= Pallavi Shah =

Indian chess player

Personal information
- Full name: Pallavi G. Shah
- Born: 15 November 1979 (age 46)

Chess career
- Country: India
- Title: Woman International Master (1999)
- Peak rating: 2272 (January 1999)

Pallavi G. Shah (born 15 November 1979) is an Indian chess player. She received the FIDE title of Woman International Master (WIM) in 1999.

== Biography ==
Pallavi Shah participated in World Youth Chess Championships in various age groups. In 2001, in Colombo she won Women's World Chess Championship Asian Zonal tournament. In 2001, Pallavi Shah participated in Women's World Chess Championship by knock-out system and in the first round lost to Antoaneta Stefanova.

Pallavi Shah played for India in the Women's Chess Olympiads:

- In 1996, at first reserve board in the 32nd Chess Olympiad (women) in Yerevan (+3, =2, -2),
- In 1998, at third board in the 33rd Chess Olympiad (women) in Elista (+4, =5, -1),
- In 2000, at first reserve board in the 34th Chess Olympiad (women) in Istanbul (+1, =0, -4).
