= Women's World Chess Championship 1999 =

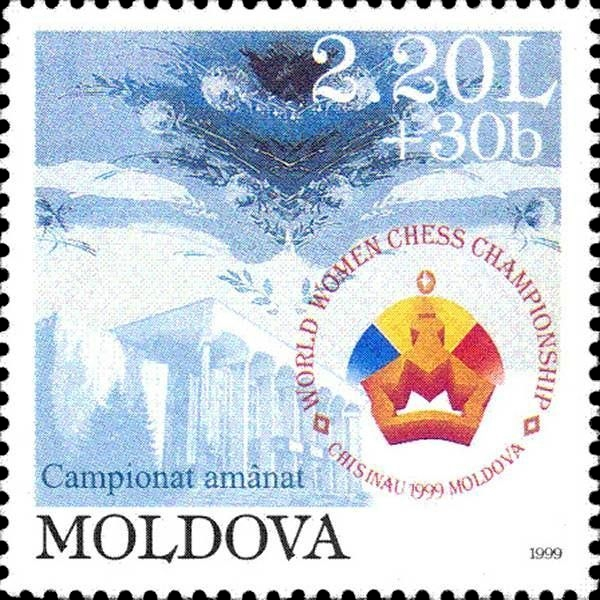
Women's World Chess Championship 1999 on a stamp of Moldova

The 1999 Women's World Chess Championship was won by former champion Xie Jun, who regained her title after defeating Alisa Galliamova. Previous to the match, reigning champion Susan Polgar had been stripped of her title after much controversy.

== 1995 Interzonal Tournament ==
As part of the qualification process, an Interzonal tournament was held in Chişinău in 1995, featuring the best players from each FIDE zone. 52 players took part with the top seven qualifying for the Candidates Tournament. For the third time, the Interzonal was played as a 13-round Swiss system tournament.

1995 Women's Interzonal Tournament
	Player	1	2	3	4	5	6	7	8	9	10	11	12	13	Points	Tie break
1	Ketevan Arakhamia (Georgia)	+36	+44	+11	=2	+4	+8	-3	+9	=7	=6	+10	-5	+19	9½	
2	Ketino Kachiani-Gersinska (Germany)	+45	+43	+20	=1	+19	+4	=6	=11	=3	=10	=5	=7	=8	9	
3	Nana Ioseliani (Georgia)	+33	=17	=8	+32	=7	=12	+1	+20	=2	=9	=4	=11	=5	8½	64.50
4	Alisa Galliamova-Ivanchuk (Ukraine)	+16	+31	=19	+5	-1	-2	=26	+18	+11	=17	=3	=9	+7	8½	63.50
5	Peng Zhaoqin (China)	=15	+42	+39	-4	-17	+18	=25	+27	+21	=7	=2	+1	=3	8½	60.75
6	Alisa Marić (Serbia and Montenegro)	=38	=26	+47	=29	=18	+19	=2	=8	+12	=1	-7	+20	+11	8½	60.25
7	Nino Gurieli (Georgia)	+27	=39	=18	+25	=3	=9	=8	+17	=1	=5	+6	=2	-4	8	60.50
8	Vesna Bašagić (Bosnia and Herzegovina)	+24	+9	=3	=19	+20	-1	=7	=6	-10	+23	=17	+21	=2	8	60.00
9	Svetlana Matveeva (Russia)	+13	-8	+40	=17	+33	=7	+12	-1	+20	=3	=11	=4	=15	8	57.00
10	Nataša Bojković (Serbia and Montenegro)	=34	-18	+42	=23	=25	=13	+38	+29	+8	=2	-1	=15	=20	7½	51.25
11	Qin Kanying (China)	+23	+47	-1	=18	=29	+38	+27	=2	-4	+31	=9	=3	-6	7½	50.50
12	Inna Gaponenko (Ukraine)	+37	=25	=17	=33	+36	=3	-9	+23	-6	+39	-21	=14	+30	7½	48.75
13	Nino Khurtsidze (Georgia)	-9	-24	+15	+31	=22	=10	-28	=14	=27	+44	=32	+41	+33	7½	47.75
14	Elvira Sakhatova (Kazakhstan)	-39	=27	-37	=46	+50	=49	=45	=13	+42	=28	+25	=12	+29	7½	44.25
15	Petra Krupková (Czech Republic)	=5	-32	-13	-45	+51	+37	=36	+49	+33	=26	+31	=10	=9	7½	44.25
16	Lidia Semenova (Ukraine)	-4	=35	-27	+51	=43	-28	+50	=34	+45	-19	+23	+37	+26	7½	40.50
17	Cristina Adela Foișor (Romania)	+41	=3	=12	=9	+5	=27	=21	-7	+28	=4	=8	-19	=18	7	51.00
18	Wang Lei (China)	=28	+10	=7	=11	=6	-5	+32	-4	+30	=20	=19	=31	=17	7	49.00
19	Zhu Chen (China)	+49	+30	=4	=8	-2	-6	-23	+44	=22	+16	=18	+17	-1	7	45.75
20	Almira Skripchenko (Moldova)	+48	+22	-2	+34	-8	+26	+29	-3	-9	=18	+41	-6	=10	7	43.75
21	Hoang Thanh Trang (Vietnam)	-25	=37	+43	=49	=40	+36	=17	+30	-5	=29	+12	-8	=22	7	43.25
22	Tatjana Shumiakina (Russia)	+46	-20	=49	=40	=13	=23	=30	=33	=19	=25	+39	=29	=21	7	42.50
23	Miranda Khorava (Georgia)	-11	+52	+28	=10	-26	=22	+19	-12	+38	-8	-16	+39	+32	7	38.75
24	Suzana Maksimović (Serbia and Montenegro)	-8	+13	=30	-36	-45	=42	+43	-32	=46	=47	+52	+38	+34	7	36.00
25	Lu Xiaosha (China)	+21	=12	=32	-7	=10	+33	=5	=28	-26	=22	-14	+27	=31	6½	44.25
26	Anjelina Belakovskaia (USA)	=40	=6	=36	+37	+23	-20	=4	-39	+25	=15	=29	=30	-16	6½	44.00
27	Marina Sheremetieva (Moldova)	-7	=14	+16	+30	+28	=17	-11	-5	=13	=32	=33	-25	+41	6½	43.00
28	Antoaneta Stefanova (Bulgaria)	=18	=34	-23	+48	-27	+16	+13	=25	-17	=14	-30	=35	+40	6½	42.00
29	Elina Danielian (Armenia)	-43	+45	+46	=6	=11	+32	-20	-10	+40	=21	=26	=22	-14	6½	39.75
30	Natalia Edzgveradze (Georgia)	+51	-19	=24	-27	+35	+41	=22	-21	-18	+34	+28	=26	-12	6½	37.25
31	Natalia Zhukova (Ukraine)	+35	-4	-33	-13	+48	=40	+49	+45	+39	-11	-15	=18	=25	6½	25.50
32	Ludmila Zaitseva (Russia)	=42	+15	=25	-3	+34	-29	-18	+24	=41	=27	=13	=33	-23	6	39.25
33	Monika Bobrowska (Poland)	-3	+41	+31	=12	-9	-25	+35	=22	-15	+40	=27	=32	-13	6	37.00
34	Maia Lomineishvili (Georgia)	=10	=28	+44	-20	-32	+46	-39	=16	=35	-30	+45	+42	-24	6	34.25
35	Dagnė Čiukšytė (Lithuania)	-31	=16	-38	+42	-30	+43	-33	=46	=34	=45	+47	=28	=37	6	33.50
36	Monika Tsiganova (Estonia)	-1	+50	=26	+24	-12	-21	=15	-38	-43	+51	=44	=49	+45	6	31.25
37	Natalia Kiseleva (Ukraine)	-12	=21	+14	-26	-41	-15	+52	+47	=44	=38	+46	-16	=35	6	30.00
38	Irina Kulish (Russia)	=6	-40	+35	=39	+49	-11	-10	+36	-23	=37	=42	-24	+52	6	29.75
39	Mónica Calzetta (Spain)	+14	=7	-5	=38	-44	+47	+34	+26	-31	-12	-22	-23	=48	5½	34.50
40	Lin Ye (China)	=26	+38	-9	=22	=21	=31	=44	=41	-29	-33	=50	+46	-28	5½	32.00
41	Irina Berezina (Australia)	-17	-33	+52	=44	+37	-30	+48	=40	=32	+43	-20	-13	-27	5½	24.75
42	Zorica Nikolin (Serbia and Montenegro)	=32	-5	-10	-35	+52	=24	=47	+50	-14	+48	=38	-34	=51	5½	23.50
43	Tatiana Ratcu (Brazil)	+29	-2	-21	=47	=16	-35	-24	+48	+36	-41	=51	-50	=49	5	27.50
44	Elena Radu (Romania)	+50	-1	-34	=41	+39	=45	=40	-19	=37	-13	=36	=48	–	5	26.50
45	Svetlana Petrenko (Moldova)	-2	-29	=51	+15	+24	=44	=14	-31	-16	=35	-34	+52	-36	5	25.75
46	Bhagyashree Thipsay (India)	-22	+48	-29	=14	=47	-34	=51	=35	=24	+52	-37	-40	=50	5	22.00
47	Tatjana Lematschko (Switzerland)	+52	-11	-6	=43	=46	-39	=42	-37	+50	=24	-35	+51	–	5	19.25
48	Johanna Paasikangas (Finland)	-20	-46	+50	-28	-31	+52	-41	-43	+51	-42	+49	=44	=39	5	17.75
49	Natia Janjgava (Georgia)	-19	+51	=22	=21	-38	=14	-31	-15	=52	=50	-48	=36	=43	4½	21.75
50	Ivona Jezierska (USA)	-44	-36	-48	+52	-14	+51	-16	-42	-47	=49	=40	+43	=46	4½	16.00
51	Sharon Ellen Burtman (USA)	-30	-49	=45	-16	-15	-50	=46	+52	-48	-36	=43	-47	=42	3	
52	Cristina Moshina (Moldova)	-47	-23	-41	-50	-42	-48	-37	-51	=49	-46	-24	-45	-38	½	

The last round game between Radu and Lematschko wasn't played.

== 1997 Candidates Tournament ==
The seven qualifiers from the Interzonal Tournament were joined by the loser of the last championship match, Xie Jun, as well as the two runners-up from the previous tournament, Chiburdanidze and Cramling. These ten players contested a double round-robin tournament in Groningen in December 1997, from which the top two would advance to the final to determine the challenger.

Galliamova and Xie Jun finished first and second. FIDE decided that the whole final match should be played in Shenyang, China, after Chinese sponsors made the best offer for the prize fund. However, Galliamova refused to play entirely on her opponent's home turf, so Xie Jun was declared the winner by default and given the right to challenge champion Polgar.

1997 Women's Candidates Tournament
	Player	Rating	1	2	3	4	5	6	7	8	9	10	Points
1	Alisa Galliamova (Russia)	2445	-	½	1	1½	2	1½	1½	1½	2	2	13½
2	Xie Jun (China)	2495	1½	-	1½	½	½	1½	2	1	2	2	12½
3	Nana Ioseliani (Georgia)	2520	1	½	-	1	1½	1½	½	1	2	2	11
4	Maia Chiburdanidze (Georgia)	2525	½	1½	1	-	1	1½	½	1	2	2	11
5	Peng Zhaoqin (China)	2400	0	1½	½	1	-	½	1½	1	1½	1½	9
6	Alisa Marić (Serbia and Montenegro)	2460	½	½	½	½	1½	-	1	1½	1½	1½	9
7	Ketevan Arakhamia-Grant (Georgia)	2430	½	0	1½	1½	½	1	-	0	2	2	9
8	Pia Cramling (Sweden)	2520	½	1	1	1	1	½	2	-	0	1½	8½
9	Nino Gurieli (Georgia)	2370	0	0	0	0	½	½	0	2	-	2	5
10	Ketino Kachiani-Gersinska (Germany)	2415	0	0	0	0	½	½	0	½	0	-	1½

Kachiani-Gersinska withdrew after 10 rounds.

== 1999 Championship Match ==
The championship match was at first scheduled to take place in November 1998, but champion Susan Polgar requested a postponement because she was pregnant. FIDE had been unable to find a satisfactory sponsor, so the request was granted. By the time FIDE announced the new date and venue for the title match to be played China in 1999, Polgar had given birth to her son Tom—however, she still considered that the time to recover from childbirth and prepare for the new match was insufficient. In addition, like Galliamova, she didn't want to play entirely in the opponent's home country. She also wanted a significantly larger prize fund, so she requested that the match be postponed again. This time FIDE refused and negotiations broke down.

Instead FIDE ruled that Polgar had forfeited the title and arranged a new title match between the two Candidates finalists, Xie Jun and Galliamova. The match was played in Kazan, Tatarstan, and Shenyang, China, in 1999. Xie Jun won by two points and regained the title that she had lost to Polgar three years previously.

Women's World Championship Match 1999
	1	2	3	4	5	6	7	8	9	10	11	12	13	14	15	Total
Alisa Galliamova (Russia)	½	0	1	½	0	1	½	½	0	½	0	1	½	0	½	6½
Xie Jun (China)	½	1	0	½	1	0	½	½	1	½	1	0	½	1	½	8½
