= Tatiana Grabuzova =

Russian chess player (born 1967)

Personal information
- Born: 9 February 1967 (age 59) Kazan, Russia

Chess career
- Country: Russia
- Title: Woman Grandmaster (1994)
- Peak rating: 2406 (January 2002)

Tatiana Grabuzova (Russian: Татьяна Валерьевна Грабузова; born 9 February 1967) is a Russian chess player. She received the FIDE title of Woman Grandmaster (WGM) in 1994.

== Biography ==
Tatiana Grabuzova started play chess in her native Kazan, later her family moved to Minsk, where she trained with Mikhail Shereshevsky. She graduated from Russian State University of Physical Education, Sport, Youth and Tourism in Moscow.

In 1985, Grabuzova won the USSR selection chess tournament for the World Junior Chess Championship in the U20 girls age group. she five times won Moscow City Women's Chess Championship (1986, 1991, 1997, 2003, 2007). In 1992, Tatiana Grabuzova won the Russian Women's Chess Cup. In 1995, in Krefeld she won German Women's Open Chess Championship. Tatiana Grabuzova is winner of many international chess tournaments, including winning Bled (1990), Moscow (1992), Tallinn (2006).

In 2001, Tatiana Grabuzova participated in Women's World Chess Championship by knock-out system and in the first round won to Julia Ryjanova but in second round lost to Corina Peptan.
