= Lin Ye =

Lin Ye is the name of:

People with the surname Lin

- Lin Ye (chess player) (born 1974), Chinese chess player
- Lin Ye (table tennis) (born 1996), Chinese-born Singaporean table tennis player

People with the surname Ye

- Ye Lin (born 1972), Chinese fencer
