= Odion Aikhoje =

Nigerian chess player

Personal information
- Born: August 5, 1971 (age 54)

Chess career
- Country: Nigeria
- Title: International Master (1999)
- Peak rating: 2341 (January 1999)

Odion Aikhoje (born 1971) is a Nigerian chess International Master (IM), Chess Olympiad individual gold medal winner (1998).

== Biography ==
In 1997, Odion Aikhoje made his debut in the Nigerian Chess Team at the African Team Chess Championship. In 1998, in Tanta he ranked 2nd in the African Chess Zonal Tournament.

Odion Aikhoje played for Nigeria in the Chess Olympiads:

- In 1998, at second board in the 33rd Chess Olympiad in Elista (+6, =1, -1) and won individual gold medal,
- In 2002, at first reserve board in the 35th Chess Olympiad in Bled (+5, =1, -5),
- In 2006, at third board in the 37th Chess Olympiad in Turin (+3, =4, -5).

Odion Aikhoje played for Nigeria in the African Games:

- In 2003, at second board in the 8th African Games in Abuja (+5, =1, -0) and won individual gold medal,
- In 2007, at third board in the 9th African Games in Algiers (+7, =4, -0).

Odion Aikhoje has never received his 1998 Chess Olympiad gold medal, the first Nigerian chess player's medal at this level, due to various bureaucratic complications. Ten years later, at the 2008 Chess Olympiad in Dresden, he was awarded a special prize in honor of the gold medal he once won.
