= Faruk Bistrić =

Bosnian chess grandmaster (1958–2024)

Personal information
- Born: 1 January 1958 Sarajevo, Bosnia and Hercegovina
- Died: 29 April 2024 (aged 66) Sarajevo, Bosnia and Hercegovina

Chess career
- Country: Bosnia and Hercegovina
- Title: Grandmaster (2002)
- Peak rating: 2523 (July 2003)

Faruk Bistric (January 1, 1958, Sarajevo, Bosnia and Herzegovina - April 29, 2024, Sarajevo, Bosnia and Herzegovina) was Chess champion of Bosnia & Herzegovina. He was International Master in 1997 and Chess Grandmaster in 2003. He was participated in 1998 and 2002 chess Olympiads.

== Notable tournaments ==
Tournament Name	Year	ELO	Points
Opatija ZNG111 4th(Opatija)	2002	2484	8.0
Mediteran Cup IM(Rijeka)	2002	2486	7.0
Hotel Opatija 8th(Kastav)	2002	2486	11.0
Novi Sad TS01 GM(Novi Sad)	2002	2486	5.0
Rijeka IM 6th(Rijeka)	2001	2446	8.0
Kastav(Kastav)	2001	2456	8.5
Ajvatovica IM(Donji Vakuf)	2001	2454	6.5
Rijeka 5th(Rijeka)	2001	2454	6.0
Kastav(Kastav)	2000	2451	6.5
CRO-chT2(Pula)	1998	2430	6.5
Split(Split)	1997	2425	7.5
