= Janjgava =

Janjgava or Janjghava (Georgian: ჯანჯღავა) is a Georgian (Mingrelian) surname, which may refer to:

- Giorgi Janjgava, Ambassador of Georgia in Saudi Arabia
- Lasha Janjgava (born 1970), Georgian chess grandmaster
- Natia Janjgava (born 1972), Georgian chess master
- Nikoloz Janjgava (born 1970), Georgian military officer
- Vladimir Janjgava (1907–1982), Soviet general
