= Khorava =

Khorava (Georgian: მირანდა) is a Georgian surname. Notable people with the surname include:

- Akaki Khorava (1895–1972), Georgian actor
- Bachana Khorava (born 1993), Georgian athlete
- Miranda Khorava (born 1977), Georgian chess player
