= Linda Jap Tjoen San =

Dutch chess player (born 1977)

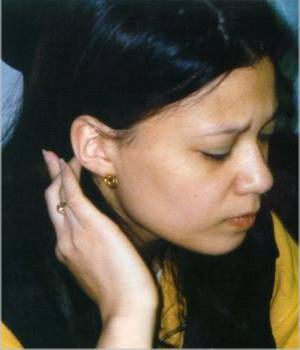

Personal information
- Born: 1 September 1977 (age 48)

Chess career
- Country: Netherlands
- Title: Woman International Master (2000)
- Peak rating: 2234 (July 1999)

Linda Jap Tjoen San (born 1 September 1977) is a Dutch chess player who holds the FIDE title of Woman International Master (WIM, 2000). She is a Dutch Women's Chess Championship medalist (1998).

== Biography ==
In the 1990s and 2000s Linda Jap Tjoen San was one of the leading Dutch women's chess players. In 1991, she won Dutch Youth Chess Championship in U14 girl's age group. In 1993, Linda Jap Tjoen San won Dutch Youth Chess Championship in U16 girl's age group. In 1995, she with Dutch Junior National Team (U20) won the Faber Cup in Magdeburg. In 1998 in Rheden, Linda Jap Tjoen San finished third in Dutch Women's Chess Championship. In March 2005, she won Dutch Women's Rapid Chess Championship. Also Linda Jap Tjoen San twice won Dutch Women's Blitz Chess Championship: in 2005 and 2007.

Linda Jap Tjoen San played for Netherlands in the Women's Chess Olympiads:

- In 1998, at first reserve board in the 33rd Chess Olympiad (women) in Elista (+2, =1, -4),
- In 2000, at first reserve board in the 34th Chess Olympiad (women) in Istanbul (+2, =3, -1).

In 2000, she received the FIDE Woman International Master (WIM) title.
