= Maggiolo =

Maggiolo is an Italian surname. Notable people with the surname include:

- Lorenzo Maggiolo (1440-1501), Italian philosopher
- Visconte Maggiolo (1478–1530), Italian cartographer and sailor
- Eduardo Maggiolo (born 1944), Argentine sport wrestler
- Elisa Maggiolo (born 1980), Argentine chess player
- Ezequiel Maggiolo (born 1977), Argentine footballer
- Marcio Veloz Maggiolo (1936–2021), Dominican writer, archaeologist and anthropologist

Eimhy Maggiolo (2009-2024)
