= Women's World Chess Championship 2001 =

Chess tournament in Moscow, Russia

The Women's World Chess Championship 2001 took place from November 25 to December 14, 2001, in Moscow, Russia. It was won by Zhu Chen, who beat Alexandra Kosteniuk in the final by 5 to 3. The final was tied 2–2 after the classical games and decided in the rapid tie-breaks.

For the second time, the championship took the form of a 64-player knock-out tournament.

== Participants ==
The qualified players were seeded by their Elo ratings (October 2001).

1. Alisa Galliamova (RUS), 2547, IM (R)
2. Maia Chiburdanidze (GEO), 2513, GM (R)
3. Wang Pin (CHN), 2498, WGM (R)
4. Almira Skripchenko-Lautier (MDA), 2497, WGM (E)
5. Nana Ioseliani (GEO), 2497, IM (R)
6. Zhu Chen (CHN), 2497, GM (R)
7. Ekaterina Kovalevskaya (RUS), 2486, WGM (WC)
8. Xu Yuhua (CHN), 2485, WGM (R)
9. Antoaneta Stefanova (BUL), 2473, IM (R)
10. Corina-Isabela Peptan (ROM), 2462, IM (E)
11. Alisa Marić (SCG), 2457, IM (WC)
12. Alexandra Kosteniuk (RUS), 2455, IM (E)
13. Nataša Bojković (SCG), 2452, WGM (E)
14. Cristina Adela Foișor (ROM), 2444, IM (E)
15. Peng Zhaoqin (NED), 2443, IM (E)
16. Hoang Thanh Trang (VIE), 2439, IM (Z3.2a)
17. Ketevan Arakhamia-Grant (GEO), 2437, IM (E)
18. Tatiana Stepovaia-Dianchenko (RUS), 2435, WGM (E)
19. Nino Khurtsidze (GEO), 2425, IM (E)
20. Anna Zatonskih (UKR), 2419, WGM (E)
21. Xu Yuanyuan (CHN), 2411, WIM (J)
22. Svetlana Prudnikova (SCG), 2411, WGM (E)
23. Inna Gaponenko (UKR), 2409, WGM (E)
24. Subbaraman Vijayalakshmi (IND), 2405, WGM (AS)
25. Marta Zielińska (POL), 2405, WGM (E)
26. Tatiana Grabuzova (RUS), 2399, WGM (E)
27. Elena Sedina (ITA), 2398, IM (E)
28. Tatiana Kononenko (UKR), 2395, WGM (E)
29. Elisabeth Pähtz (GER), 2392, WGM (E)
30. Olga Alexandrova (UKR), 2387, IM (E)
31. Iweta Radziewicz (POL), 2387, WGM (E)
32. Natalia Kiseleva (UKR), 2382, WGM (E)
33. Lilit Mkrtchian (ARM), 2382, WGM (E)
34. Wang Yu (CHN), 2378, WFM (AS)
35. Monika Soćko (POL), 2375, IM (E)
36. Elina Danielian (ARM), 2373, WGM (E)
37. Tatiana Shumiakina (RUS), 2371, WGM (E)
38. Joanna Dworakowska (POL), 2358, WGM (E)
39. Nona Gaprindashvili (GEO), 2349, GM (PN)
40. Sulennis Piña (CUB), 2345, WIM (AM)
41. Li Ruofan (CHN), 2341, WIM (AS)
42. Svetlana Petrenko (MDA), 2336, WGM (E)
43. Camilla Baginskaite (USA), 2336, WIM (Z2.1)
44. Genrieta Lagvilava (BLR), 2326, WGM (E)
45. Julia Galianina-Ryjanova (RUS), 2320, WGM (E)
46. Aarthie Ramaswamy (IND), 2301, WIM (AS)
47. Gu Xiaobing (CHN), 2299 (Z3.3)
48. Jennifer Shahade (USA), 2295, WIM (Z2.1)
49. Maritza Arribas (CUB), 2287, WGM (Z2.3)
50. Elena Levushkina (UZB), 2280, WIM (Z3.4)
51. Huang Qian (CHN), 2275 (AS)
52. Dagnė Čiukšytė (LTU), 2271, WIM (E)
53. Nisha Mohota (IND), 2262, WIM (AS)
54. Maria Kouvatsou (GRE), 2234, WGM (PN)
55. Nava Starr (CAN), 2211, WIM (Z2.2)
56. Ngan Phan-Koshnitsky (AUS), 2182, WIM (Z3.2b)
57. Pallavi Shah (IND), 2172, WIM (Z3.1b)
58. Elina Groberman (USA), 2103 (Z2.1)
59. Elisa Maggiolo (ARG), 2090, WIM (Z2.5)
60. Joara Chaves (BRA), 2079, WIM (Z2.4)
61. Farida Arouche (ALG), 2077 (AF)
62. Shadi Paridar (IRI), 2071, WIM (Z3.1a)
63. Asma Houli (ALG) (AF)
64. Wissam Toubal (ALG) (AF)

Notable top players not taking part were Judit Polgár (ranked the no. 1 woman in the world), Xie Jun (ranked 2nd), Wang Lei (4th), Pia Cramling (6th), Koneru Humpy (13th), Qin Kanying (15th), Sofia Polgar (16th), and Viktorija Čmilytė (20th).

Polgár, ranked 1st female and 19th overall in the world, chose instead to participate in the concurrent open event. Reigning champion Xie Jun had put her active career on hold at the time and decided not to defend her title.

=== Qualification paths ===
- WC: semifinalists of Women's World Chess Championship 2000 (2)
- J: World Junior Champion 2000
- R: Rating (7)
- E: European Individual Chess Championship (29)
- AM: American Continental Chess Championship 2001
- AS: Asian Chess Championship (6)
- AF: African Chess Championship 2001 (3)
- Z2.1 (3), Z2.2, Z2.3, Z2.4, Z2.5, Z3.1a, Z3.1b, Z3.2a, Z3.2b, Z3.3, Z3.4: Zonal tournaments
- PN: FIDE President nominee (2)

== Results ==
=== Final Match ===
Women's World Chess Championship Final 2001
	Classical games				Rapid tie-breaks				Total
	1	2	3	4	5	6	7	8	Total
Zhu Chen (China)	0	1	1	0	1	0	1	1	5
Alexandra Kosteniuk (Russia)	1	0	0	1	0	1	0	0	3

=== Bracket ===
1st Round
1	Alisa Galliamova	1½
64	Wissam Toubal	½
32	Natalia Kiseleva	3
34	Wang Yu	1
12	Alexandra Kosteniuk	2
47	Jennifer Shahade	0
16	Hoang Thanh Trang	1½
49	Huang Qian	½
6	Almira Skripchenko	2
54	Ngan Phan-Koshnitsky	0
25	Marta Zielińska	3½
39	Nona Gaprindashvili	2½
44	Julia Galianina-Ryjanova	½
26	Tatiana Grabuzova	1½
10	Corina-Isabela Peptan	2
53	Nava Starr	0
3	Wang Pin	1½
57	Joara Chaves	½
29	Elisabeth Pähtz	3½
31	Iweta Radziewicz	2½
14	Cristina Adela Foișor	3
46	Gu Xiaobing	1
18	Tatiana Stepovaia-Dianchenko	2½
51	Nisha Mohota	3½
8	Xu Yuhua	2
58	Farida Arouche	0
37	Tatiana Shumiakina	0
36	Elina Danielian	2
21	Svetlana Prudnikova	2
42	Camilla Baginskaite	4
13	Nataša Bojković	1½
52	Maria Kouvatsou	½
2	Maia Chiburdanidze	1½
61	Asma Houli	½
30	Olga Alexandrova	0
27	Elena Sedina	2
23	Xu Yuanyuan	4
63	Sulennis Piña	2
17	Ketevan Arakhamia-Grant	1½
50	Dagnė Čiukšytė	2½
5	Nana Ioseliani	1½
56	Elina Groberman	½
24	Subbaraman Vijayalakshmi	½
38	Joanna Dworakowska	1½
15	Peng Zhaoqin	2
60	Maritza Arribas	0
9	Antoaneta Stefanova	1½
55	Pallavi Shah	½
7	Ekaterina Kovalevskaya	1½
59	Shadi Paridar	½
33	Lilit Mkrtchian	2
35	Monika Soćko	0
20	Anna Zatonskih	1½
40	Li Ruofan	½
19	Nino Khurtsidze	1½
45	Aarthie Ramaswamy	½
4	Zhu Chen	1½
62	Elisa Maggiolo	½
28	Tatiana Kononenko	0
41	Svetlana Petrenko	2
22	Inna Gaponenko	2
43	Genrieta Lagvilava	0
11	Alisa Marić	1½
48	Elena Levushkina	½

2nd Round
Alisa Galliamova	2
Natalia Kiseleva	0
Alexandra Kosteniuk	1½
Hoang Thanh Trang	½
Almira Skripchenko	3
Marta Zielińska	1
Tatiana Grabuzova	½
Corina-Isabela Peptan	1½
Wang Pin	½
Elisabeth Pähtz	1½
Cristina Adela Foișor	1½
Nisha Mohota	½
Xu Yuhua	1½
Elina Danielian	½
Camilla Baginskaite	1½
Nataša Bojković	½
Maia Chiburdanidze	1½
Elena Sedina	½
Xu Yuanyuan	½
Dagnė Čiukšytė	1½
Nana Ioseliani	½
Joanna Dworakowska	1½
Peng Zhaoqin	2
Antoaneta Stefanova	0
Ekaterina Kovalevskaya	1½
Lilit Mkrtchian	½
Anna Zatonskih	½
Nino Khurtsidze	1½
Zhu Chen	1½
Svetlana Petrenko	½
Inna Gaponenko	½
Alisa Marić	1½

3rd Round
Alisa Galliamova	0
Alexandra Kosteniuk	2
Almira Skripchenko	1½
Corina-Isabela Peptan	½
Elisabeth Pähtz	½
Cristina Adela Foișor	1½
Xu Yuhua	3
Camilla Baginskaite	1
Maia Chiburdanidze	2
Dagnė Čiukšytė	0
Joanna Dworakowska	1½
Peng Zhaoqin	2½
Ekaterina Kovalevskaya	½
Nino Khurtsidze	1½
Zhu Chen	3
Alisa Marić	1

Quarterfinals
Alexandra Kosteniuk	1½
Almira Skripchenko	½
Cristina Adela Foișor	2
Xu Yuhua	4
Maia Chiburdanidze	3½
Peng Zhaoqin	2½
Nino Khurtsidze	3
Zhu Chen	4

Semifinals
Alexandra Kosteniuk	3
Xu Yuhua	1
Maia Chiburdanidze	1½
Zhu Chen	2½

Finals
Alexandra Kosteniuk	3
Zhu Chen	5
