= Elisa Maggiolo =

Argentine chess player

Personal information
- Born: 26 February 1980 (age 46)

Chess career
- Country: Argentina
- Title: Woman International Master (2001)
- FIDE rating: 1957 (May 2021)
- Peak rating: 2119 (July 2007)

Elisa Maggiolo (born 23 February 1980) is an Argentine chess player and Woman International Master (WIM, 2001). She is a two-time winner of the Argentine Women's Chess Championship (1995, 1998).

== Biography ==
From the 1990s to the 2000s, Elisa Maggiolo is one of the leading Argentine women's chess players. She two times won the Argentine women's chess championships: 1995 and 1998. In 1999, she won second place in the South America Zonal tournament and get the right to take part in Women's World Chess Championship. In 2001, Elisa Maggiolo participated in Women's World Chess Championship by knock-out system and in the first round lost to Zhu Chen. In 1998, Elisa Maggiolo played for Argentina in the 1st World Junior Team Chess Championship at third board (+4, =0, -3).

Elisa Maggiolo played for Argentina in the Women's Chess Olympiads:

- In 1998, at second board in the 33rd Chess Olympiad (women) in Elista (+5, =3, -3),
- In 2000, at third board in the 34th Chess Olympiad (women) in Istanbul (+3, =2, -5).

In 2001, she was awarded the FIDE Woman International Master (WIM) title.
