= Elina Groberman =

American chess player (born 1983)

Personal information
- Born: 16 February 1983 (age 43) Kishinev, Moldavian SSR, Soviet Union

Chess career
- Country: United States
- Title: Woman International Master (2002)
- Peak rating: 2137 (April 2003)

Elina Groberman (born 16 February 1983) is a Moldova-born American chess player who holds the FIDE title of Woman International Master (WIM, 2000). She is a co-winner of the U.S. Women's Chess Championship (2000).

== Biography ==
In 1995, she moved to the United States with her family. Groberman won the New York State Women's Chess Championships three years in a row (1996-1998). In 1998, she won the Pan American Youth Girl's Chess Championship in the U18 age group. Three times she participated in the World Junior Chess Championship (1997-1999). In 2000, Groberman shared first place with Camilla Baginskaite in the U.S. Women's Chess Championship. In 2001, Elina Groberman participated in Women's World Chess Championship by knock-out system and in the first round lost to Nana Ioseliani.

In 2000, she was awarded the FIDE Woman International Master (WIM) title.

Later, Groberman rarely participated in chess tournaments. She graduated from the Massachusetts Institute of Technology and worked for Deutsche Bank Securities Inc.

== Literature ==
- Игорь Бердичевский. Шахматная еврейская энциклопедия. Москва: Русский шахматный дом, 2016 (Igor Berdichevsky. The Chess Jewish Encyclopedia. Moscow: Russian Chess House, 2016) ISBN 978-5-94693-503-6
