= Nisha Mohota =

Indian chess player (born 1980)

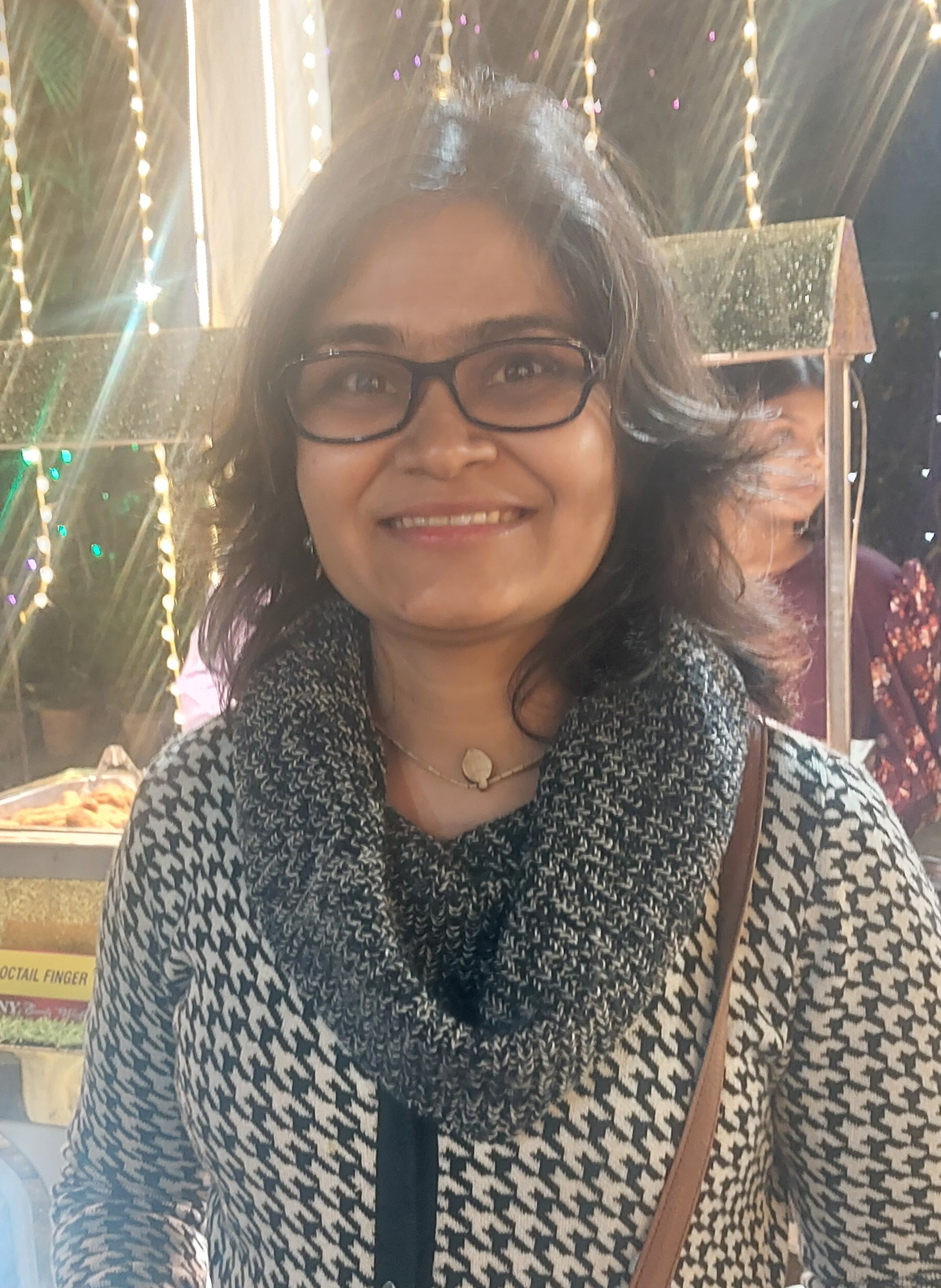

Personal information
- Born: 13 October 1980 (age 46) Hinganghat, India

Chess career
- Country: India
- Title: International Master (2011); Woman Grandmaster (2003)
- Peak rating: 2416 (October 2007)

Nisha Mohota (born 13 October 1980 in Hinganghat) is an Indian chess player who holds the FIDE titles of International Master (IM) and Woman Grandmaster (WGM). She is the first WGM from the State of West Bengal.

== Career ==
She became the then youngest Woman International Master (WIM) in April 1995 at the age of 14 years, 6 months and 13 days on 26 April 1995. In December 1996, Nisha was given a cash award by the then Prime Minister of India, H. D. Deve Gowda, for achieving the coveted title. Nisha held the record for the youngest WIM of India until 1999 when it was broken by Koneru Humpy.

Nisha competed in the Women's World Chess Championship in 2001 and 2008. In 2005 Nisha Mohota won the Women's Indian Chess Championship.

In 2014, Nisha won the National Women's Challengers Championship, a title she personally ranks above her 2005 National Championship victory, describing it as one of her most memorable achievements.

Nisha Mohota played for the Indian national team in the Women's Chess Olympiads of 2004, 2008 and 2010, Women's World Team Chess Championship in 2013, Women's Asian Team Chess Championships of 2003, 2005, 2008 and 2009, and 2010 Asian Games.

Objecting to comments made by British grandmaster Nigel Short, Mohota has spoken on behalf of equal rights of women, and of the particular challenges faced by women in chess.
