= Chess City =

Russian sports venue

Coordinates: 46.296667°N 44.297500°E

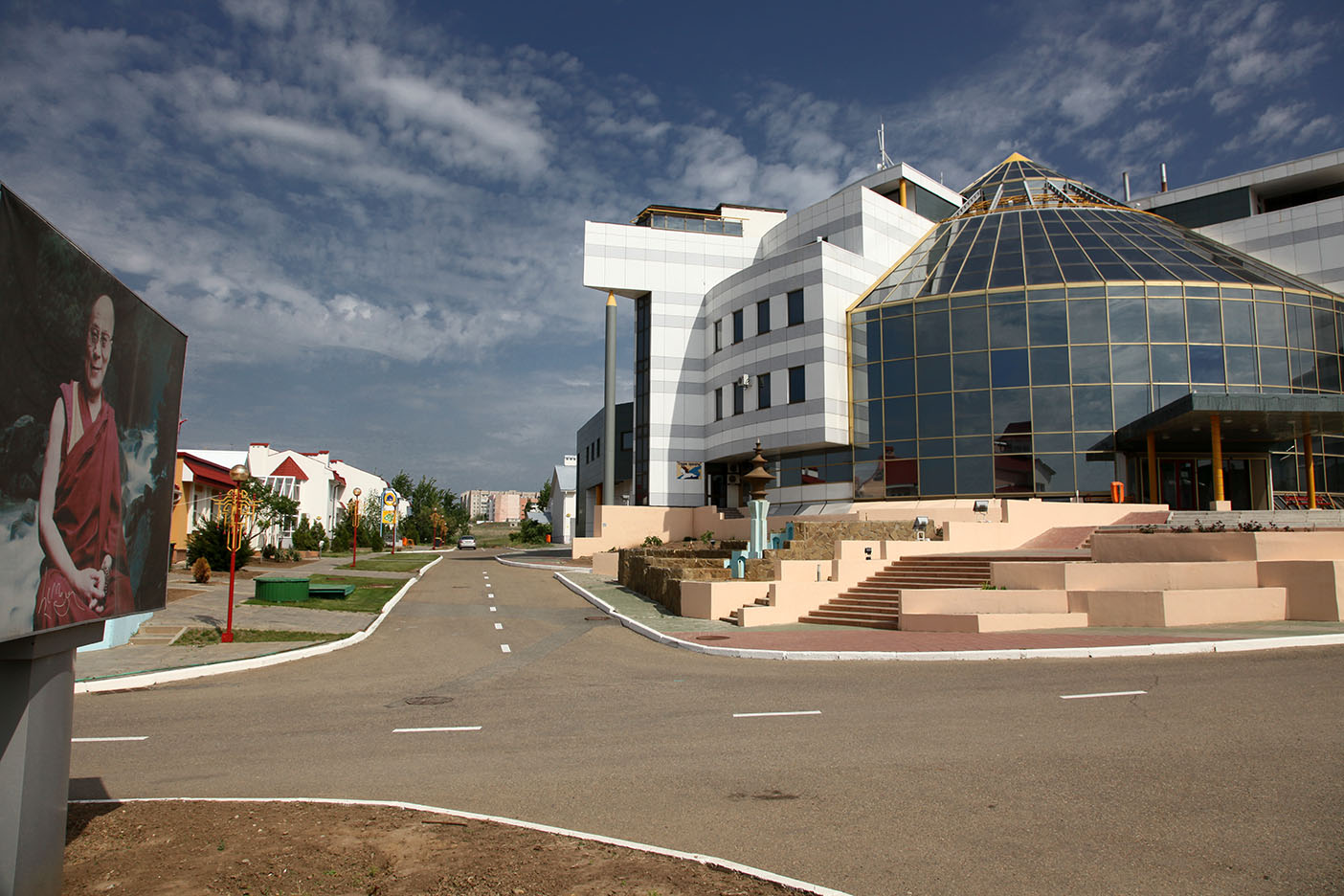
The main building of the Chess City complex

Chess City (also referred to as City-Chess; Russian: Сити-Чесс Siti-Chess or Город Шахмат Gorod Shakhmat) is a large complex devoted to chess and chess competitions located east of Elista, Kalmykia, in Russia. The neighborhood-size development consists of a central, four-story domed City Chess Hall surrounded by an Olympic-style village of Californian-Mediterranean Revival Style architecture. The site has a conference center, public swimming pool and a museum of Kalmyk Buddhist art. The complex features sculptures and artwork devoted to chess, including a statue of Ostap Bender, a fictional character of popular books written by Ilya Ilf and Yevgeni Petrov, who proposed the creation of a world chess capital. The complex has been used to host visiting dignitaries like the Dalai Lama.

Completed in 1998, the idea and development of Chess City is directly the result of Kirsan Ilyumzhinov, Kalmykia's millionaire President who has ruled the republic since 1993 and was president of FIDE, the international governing body of chess, from 1995 until his ousting in 2018. A fanatical chess enthusiast, Ilyumzhinov had the complex built in time for the 33rd Chess Olympiad.

Chess City has hosted three major FIDE tournaments: the XXXIII Chess Olympiad in 1998, the 2004 Women's World Chess Championship, and the 2006 World Chess Championship.

In 2026, no chess event is being organized in Chess City anymore and the Chess Palace has been closed for years. Most buildings are closed for renovation, and only the Chess Museum remains partly open. Some of the cottages are used by organizations or individuals who have purchased them.

== Controversy ==
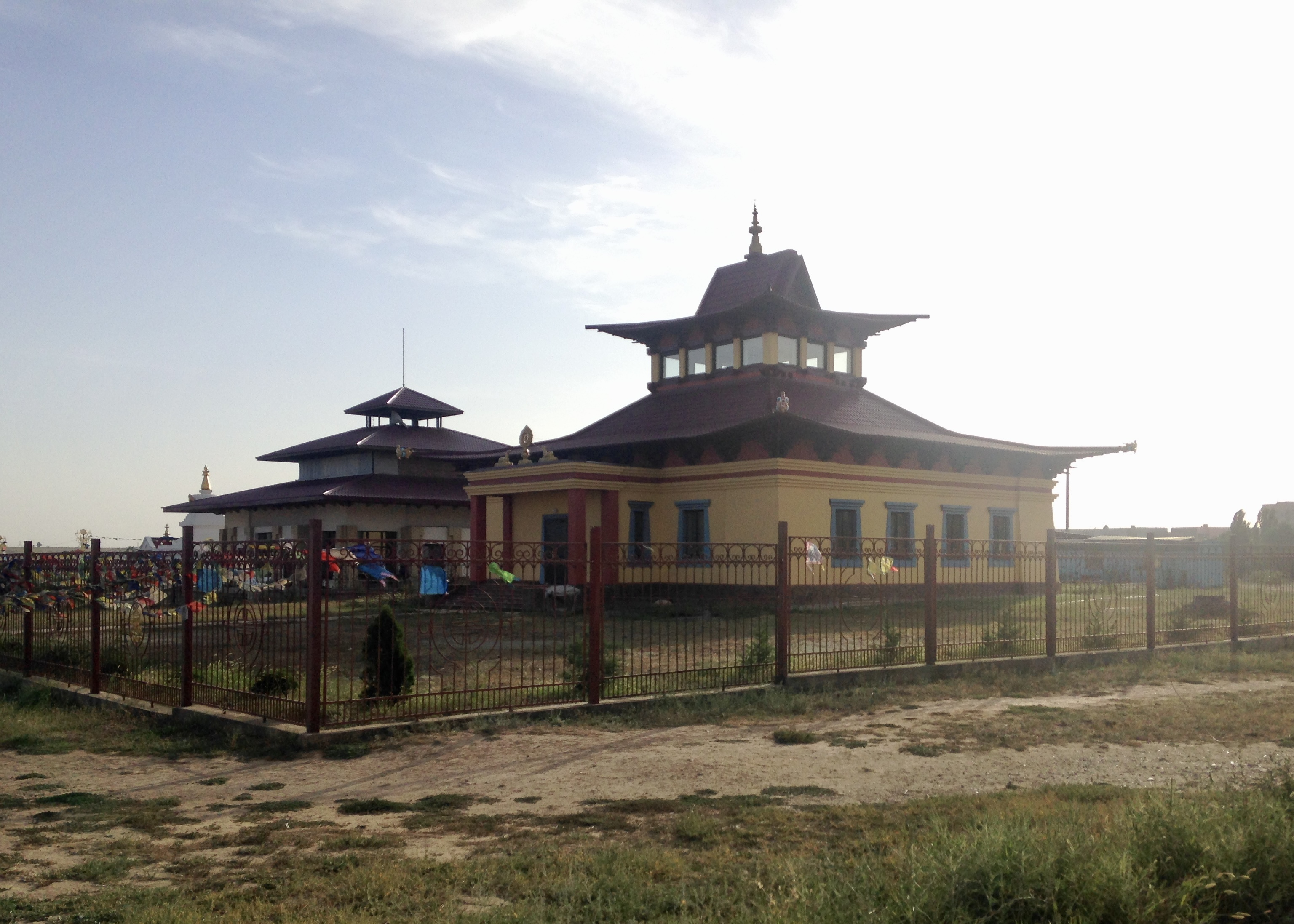
Buddhist temple near the entrance to the complex

Kalmykia is a republic of approximately 300,000 people located in the barren steppe regions in the southeastern corner of Europe. Without much in terms of natural resources, the nation is economically depressed and many of its citizens live in poverty. As a result, the construction of the opulent Chess City was greatly criticized for spending large sums of money on a tourist resort. Chess tournament winners are sometimes rewarded with a diamond tiara. Additionally, the desert climate of the area puts many of the planned expansions for Chess City, like the water sports complex, under scrutiny.
