= Gary Koshnitsky =

Australian chess player (1907–1999)

Gregory (Gary) Koshnitsky MBE (6 October 1907, Kishinev – 17 September 1999, Australia) was an Australian chess player.

Born in Kishinev, in the Bessarabia Governorate of the Russian Empire (now Moldova), he emigrated in his youth to Australia.

He was Australian Champion in 1933 and 1939 (with Lajos Steiner), and won three Queensland titles, seven New South Wales titles, and one South Australian title (1966). His last win was something of an anniversary, as he won his first tournament in Australia, the Queensland championship in 1926. He captained the Australian Olympic Chess teams in 1964, 1968, 1972 and 1980.

Koshnitsky was awarded the IMC title (International Master of Correspondence Chess) in 1972. He was appointed Honorary Member of FIDE in 1993.

He was the author of the book Chess Made Easy (with Cecil Purdy).

His wife Evelyn Koshnitsky (1915-2014) won the South Australian Women's championship in 1964 and 1966, though she was more notable as a chess administrator. She was awarded a British Empire Medal in 1980, and was awarded a Member of the Order of Australia (AM) in 1990 for services to chess. Every year, the Australian Chess Federation (ACF) awards the Koshnitsky Medal for contributions to chess administration.

He was the father-in-law of Ngan Phan-Koshnitsky.
