= Ivona Jezierska =

American chess player

Personal information
- Born: 1958 (age 67–68) Poland

Chess career
- Country: Poland (until 1983); United States (since 1983)
- Title: Woman FIDE Master (1985)
- Peak rating: 2100 (January 1987)

Ivona Jezierska (born 1958) is a Polish-American Woman FIDE master (WFM) (1985).

== Biography ==
In 1978, Ivona Jezierska took the 5th place in the Polish Women's Chess Championship. In the early 1980s, she moved to the United States. Ivona Jezierska participated in several U.S. Women's Chess Championships. In 1995, Ivona Jezierska participated in Women's World Chess Championship Interzonal Tournament in Chişinău where ranked 50th place.

Ivona Jezierska played for United States in the Women's Chess Olympiads:

- In 1984, at third board in the 26th Chess Olympiad (women) in Thessaloniki (+3, =2, -5),
- In 1986, at second board in the 27th Chess Olympiad (women) in Dubai (+7, =3, -2).

Since mid-2000, she rarely participate in chess tournaments.
