= Ngan Phan-Koshnitsky =

Vietnamese-Australian chess player (born 1974)

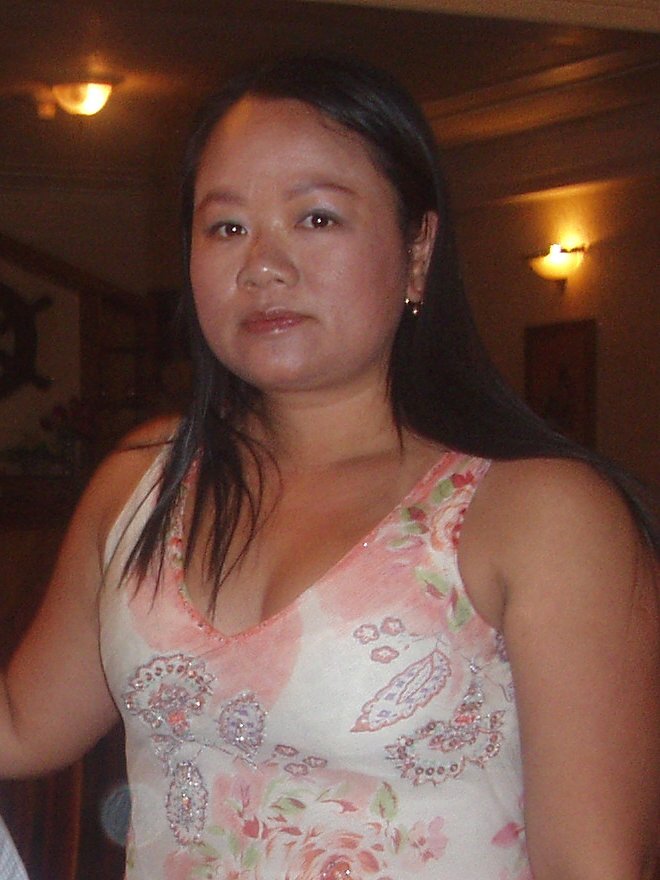
- Ngan Phan-Koshnitsky in Vietnam in February 2007

Personal information
- Born: 24 February 1974 (age 52) Vietnam
- Spouse: Peter Koshnitsky (divorced)

Chess career
- Country: Vietnam (until 1996); Australia (since 1996)
- Title: Woman International Master (2001)
- FIDE rating: 2168 (July 2006)
- Peak rating: 2183 (January 2003)

Ngan Phan-Koshnitsky (born Phan Huỳnh Băng Ngân; 24 February 1974), is a Vietnamese-Australian chess player. She holds the title of Woman International Master (WIM), and won the 1998 Australian Women's Chess Championship. Since 2007 she has been known as Ngan Nadalin.

== Chess career ==
Phan-Koshnitsky represented Vietnam in two Women's Chess Olympiads, in 1990 and 1992, and Australia in five Olympiads between 1996 and 2006.

She won the Australian Women's Championship in 1998. In the same year, she also competed in the Asian Women's Championship in the Genting Highlands, Malaysia, scoring 6/11.

Phan-Koshnitsky won the Oceania Women's Championship held on the Gold Coast, Queensland in April 2001. She went on to compete in the Women's World Chess Championship 2001 in Moscow, Russia, where she was eliminated in round 1 by Almira Skripchenko.

Phan-Koshnitsky was awarded by FIDE the titles of Woman FIDE Master (WFM) in 1995 and Woman International Master (WIM) in 2001.

As of 2026, her last FIDE-rated event was the 2006 Chess Olympiad, where she played on the Australian Women's team.

== Personal life ==
In the early 1990s, she married Peter Koshnitsky, son of former Australian chess champion Gary Koshnitsky. She remarried in 2007 and is now Ngan Nadalin.
