= Lu Xiaosha =

Chinese chess player (born 1973)

Personal information
- Born: 1973 (age 52–53)

Chess career
- Country: China
- Title: Woman International Master (1995)
- Peak rating: 2280 (July 1995)

Lu Xiaosha (Chinese: 呂小莎; pinyin: Lu Xiaosha; born 1973), also known as Sarah Lu, is a Chinese chess player who holds the FIDE title of Woman International Master (WIM, 1995).

== Biography ==
In 1995, Lu participated in Women's World Chess Championship Interzonal Tournament in Chişinău where ranked 25th place. In 1995, she was awarded the FIDE Woman International Master (WIM) title.

Later Lu moved to United States. In 2001, she won the Hawaii State Chess Championship. Lu is currently living in California, where she operates a chess school (Beyond Chess) alongside her husband Ben Deng.
