= Gintautėlė Laimutė Baginskienė =

Lithuanian painter (born 1940)

Gintautėlė Laimutė Baginskienė (born 1940) is a Lithuanian painter.

In 1958–1964 she studied the Lithuanian Institute of Art.

Her spouse is Prof. Tadas Baginskas, and daughter is a well-known chess player – Women's International Master Kamilė Baginskaitė.

== Works ==
Her work is monumental, decorative shapes, highlighting fabric of minerals, metals properties. Leaded Glass conditional forms, decorative compositions, laconic, the later – expressive. Colorless and colored glass dish sets (1970–1971 m.) is neat silhouettes, nedekoruoti.

Creator of ornamental metal products:

- Wall display of minerals in the USSR pavilion at Expo-67 Montreal, with a T. Baginsku Baginski
- T. Pan's Soviet pavilion at Expo-70 "Osaka, the T. Baginsku Baginski
- Pan Geology of the USSR in the exhibition in Paris, 1971, the
- Pan Lithuanian national economy in the exhibition in Santiago, 1972, the

Stained-glass panels from the minerals:

- Geology of the USSR in the exhibition in Milan and Damascus, both of 1975.

Stained glass from the glass:

- Trakai Restaurant "head", 1973, 1997
- Kedainiai restaurant, 1976
- Klaipeda Chamber of marriages, 1984
- Lithuanian Sea Museum, 1986
- Panevezys Cultural Center, Forest Tree Grew, 1989
- Utena brewery in 1995
- The discovery of the Cross Church, 1997

== See also ==
- List of Lithuanian artists
