= Julia Ryjanova =

Russian-Australian chess player (born 1974)

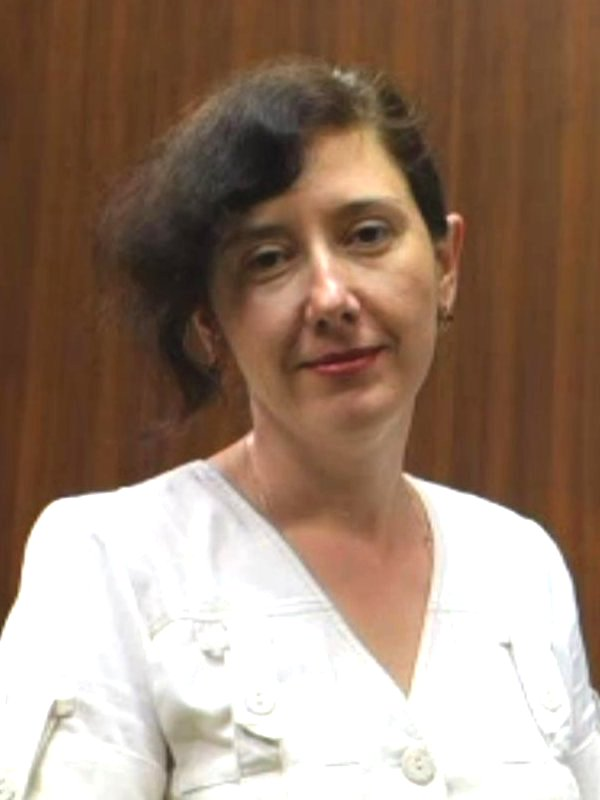
- Julia Ryjanova at the 2015 Australian Women's Masters in Melbourne.

Personal information
- Born: 15 May 1974 (age 52) Orenburg, Russian SFSR, Soviet Union

Chess career
- Country: Russia (until 2017); Australia (since 2017)
- Title: Woman Grandmaster (2000)
- Peak rating: 2415 (January 2003)

Julia Ryjanova (also known as Julia Galianina and Julia Galianina-Ryjanova; Russian: Юлия Рыжанова; born 15 May 1974) is a Russian and Australian chess player with the title of Woman Grandmaster (WGM). She competed in the Women's World Chess Championship in 2001.

== Chess career ==
Ryjanova was awarded the title Woman Grandmaster by FIDE in 2000. In the same year, she won the bronze medal in the Russian Women's Chess Championship in Elista.

She has been ranked in FIDE's top 50 highest rated female chess players in the world during the early 2000s. Her best ranking is the 40th highest rated female chess player in the world in January 2003, with a rating of 2415.

Ryjanova stopped playing in official competitions in 2003 to work as a chess coach in Qatar, and has been the captain of the Qatari women's chess team since 2008.

In January 2015, Ryjanova tied for fourth place in the Australian Open Chess Championship and won the Australian Women's Masters. In 2017, she transferred federations to represent Australia.

Oceania Chess Women's champion 2019 and 2023 -
