= Tatiana Shumiakina =

Russian chess player (born 1965)

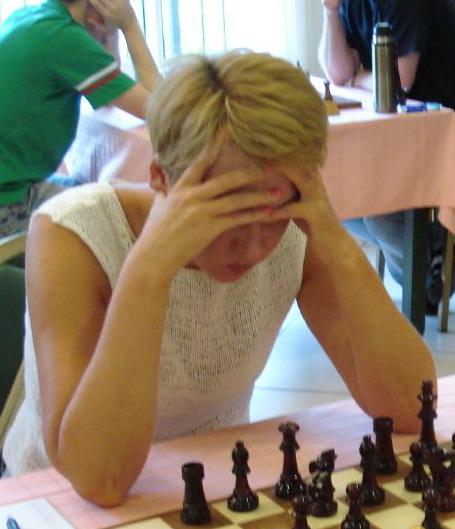
- Shumiakina in 2007

Personal information
- Born: 4 October 1965 (age 60) Chelyabinsk, Russia

Chess career
- Country: Soviet Union; Russia
- Title: Woman Grandmaster (1994)
- FIDE rating: 2325 (January 2010)
- Peak rating: 2376 (October 2000)

Tatiana Shumiakina (Russian: Татьяна Анатольевна Шумякина; born 4 October 1965) is a Russian chess player who holds the title of Woman Grandmaster (WGM, 1994).

== Chess career ==
In 1990, Shumiakina won a bronze medal in USSR Women's Chess Championship. In 2000 she won Russia Women's Chess Cup. Won multiple international women's chess tournaments: Prešov (1988), Chelyabinsk (1990), Timișoara (1994) Bucharest (1994, together with Elena-Luminița Cosma).

Shumiakina twice participated in the Women's World Chess Championship Interzonal Tournaments where in 1993 in Jakarta and in 1995 in Chişinău she ranked 22nd place. In 2001, Tatiana Shumiakina participated in Women's World Chess Championship 2001 by knock-out and in the first round lost to Elina Danielian.

Shumiakina played for Russia in the Women's Chess Olympiads:

- In 1992, at third board in the 30th Chess Olympiad (women) in Manila (+5, =3, -4),
- In 1994, at third board in the 31st Chess Olympiad (women) in Moscow (+4, =3, -3),
- In 1998, at third board in the 33rd Chess Olympiad (women) in Elista (+6, =1, -1) and won team silver and individual gold medals.

In 1989, she was awarded the FIDE Woman International Master (WIM) title and received the FIDE Woman Grandmaster (WGM) title five year later.

Shumiakina graduated from the Chelyabinsk State Institute of Physical Culture. She works as a chess trainer in Chelyabinsk children and youth sports school.
