= Geurt Gijssen =

Dutch chess player

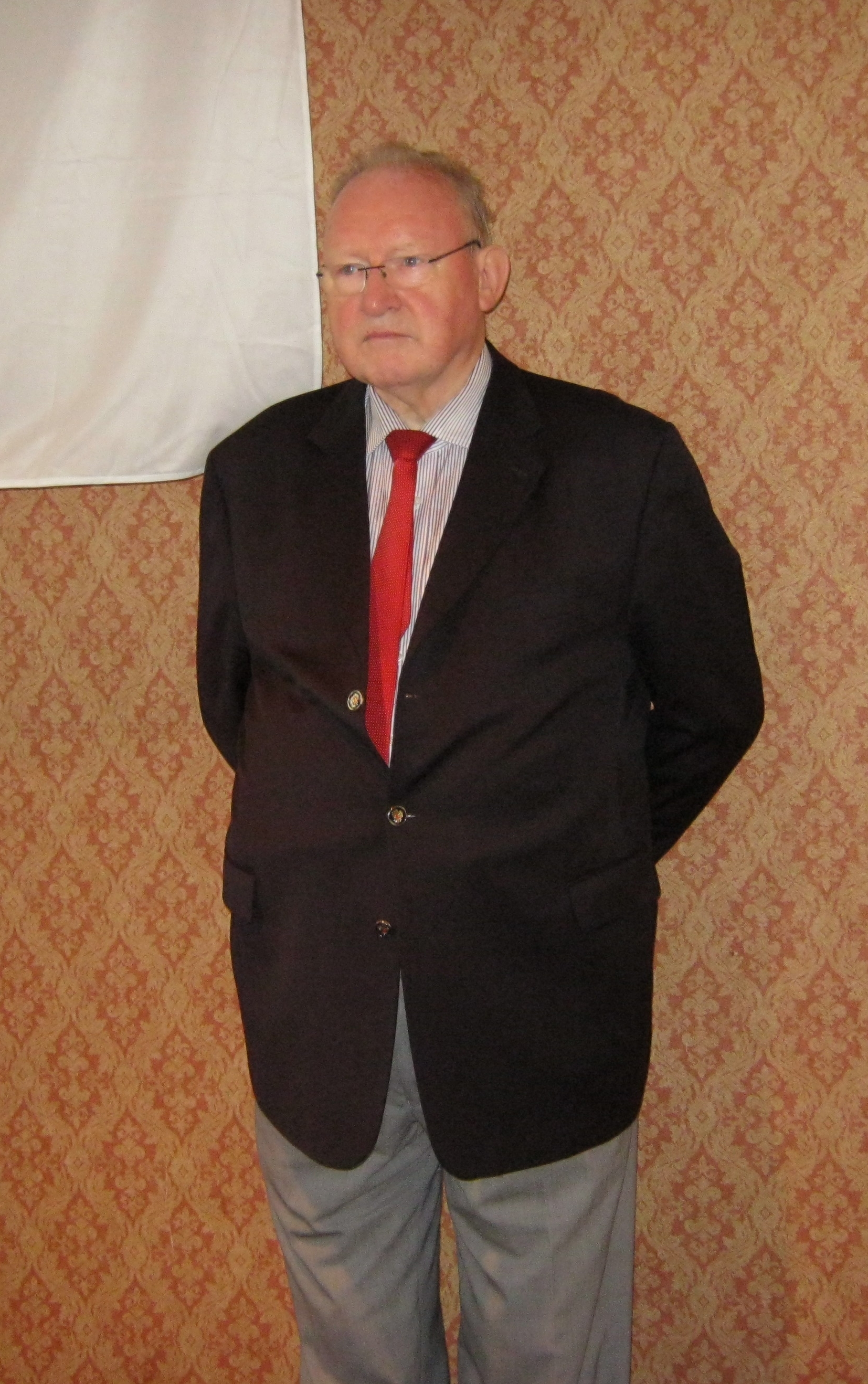
- Geurt Gijssen in 2010

Personal information
- Born: 15 August 1934 (age 91) Emmerich am Rhein, Germany

Chess career
- Country: Netherlands
- Title: International Arbiter (1979)

Geurt Gijssen (born 15 August 1934) is a Dutch chess International Arbiter (1979), FIDE Honorary Member (2013).

== Biography ==
Geurt Gijssen was born in Germany, where his father worked for a tobacco company, but after World War II the family returned to the Netherlands. He has lived in Nijmegen since 1952, where he worked as a mathematics teacher at a secondary school until he retired in 1983.

Geurt Gijssen was well known as a chess tournament referee. He has been the head referee of several Chess Olympiads (1998, 2000, 2002, 2006), as well as several matches and tournaments for World Chess Champion titles:

- Garry Kasparov – Anatoly Karpov (1987, 1990),
- Anatoly Karpov – Gata Kamsky (1996),
- Anatoly Karpov – Vishwanathan Anand (1998),
- FIDE World Chess Championship (1999),
- Vladimir Kramnik – Veselin Topalov (2006).

In 2013, he became a FIDE Honorary Member and in 2019 he received the Golden Pawn for best European Chess Arbiter from the European Chess Union
