= Gu Xiaobing =

Chinese chess player (born 1985)

Personal information
- Born: July 12, 1985 (age 40) Xinghua, Jiangsu, China

Chess career
- Country: China
- Title: Woman Grandmaster (2003)
- Peak rating: 2371 (January 2006)

Gu Xiaobing (Chinese: 谷笑冰; pinyin: Gǔ Xiàobīng; born July 12, 1985) is a Chinese chess player. She was awarded by FIDE the title of Woman Grandmaster (WGM) in 2003.

Gu competed in the Women's World Chess Championship in 2001 and 2012.

She was in the FIDE Top 20 Girls rating list from January 2003 to January 2004.

She achieved the norms required for the WGM title in the Women's Zonal 3.3 Championship in 2001, 2001 World Junior Girls Championship and Women's Chinese Chess Championship in 2002.

Gu finished runner-up to Elisabeth Pähtz in the World Junior Girls Championship 2005 in Istanbul, Turkey. In January 2016, Gu won the Australian Women's Masters, a round-robin tournament held in Melbourne, Australia. She is the director of Yangzhou Yunhe Chess Academy since 2013.

== See also ==
- Chess in China
