= Camilla Baginskaite =

Lithuanian-American chess player (born 1967)

Personal information
- Born: 24 April 1967 (age 59) Vilnius, Lithuanian SSR, Soviet Union
- Spouse: Alex Yermolinsky

Chess career
- Country: Soviet Union (until 1991); United States (1998–2019); Lithuania (1991–1998; 2019–present)
- Title: Woman Grandmaster (2002)
- Peak rating: 2365 (April 2002)

Camilla Baginskaite (Lithuanian: Kamilė Baginskaitė; born 24 April 1967) is a Lithuanian and American chess player. She was awarded the title of Woman Grandmaster (WGM) by FIDE in 2002.

== Biography ==
Baginskate was born in Vilnius. Her mother is the painter Gintautėlė Laimutė Baginskienė and her father is the architect and professor Tadas Baginskas, from whom she learned chess at eight years old, visiting a chess school when she was ten. At the age of fifteen, in 1982, Baginskate became second at women's chess championship of the Lithuanian Soviet Socialist Republic, behind Esther Epstein. In 1986, she was third after Ildikó Mádl and Svetlana Prudnikova at the World Junior Girls Championship in Vilnius, her home city. She then went on to win the event the following year in Baguio. For this achievement she received the title Woman International Master (WIM). The championship in 1987 was only her second international tournament and her first outside the Soviet Union. She won the Lithuanian Women's Chess Championship in Panevėžys in 1992.

In 1997 she moved to San Francisco, US. Baginskaite studied design in Lithuania and the US with a master's degree in history of art. She was married to Alex Yermolinsky. They have two children, a son and a daughter, and got to know each other at the Chess Olympiad 1996 in Yerevan.

For many years, Baginskaite played on the first board for Lithuania at the Women's Chess Olympiad in 1994 and 1996. She then switched to represent the U.S. team on the first board in 2000 and in 2002, played on the second board. In 2006, she was on the reserve board.

In 2000 she won the U.S. Women's Chess Championship jointly with Elina Groberman. Since Baginskaite won against Groberman in the playoff by 2-0, she qualified for the Women's World Chess Championship 2001 in Moscow, where she reached the last sixteen. This was, at the time, the best result for a female U.S. chess player since the Championship was founded in 1927. She was defeated by Xu Yuhua in a tiebreak. Baginskaite competed in the Women's World Championship also in 2010 and 2015.

In 2019, Baginskaite switched her national federation back to Lithuania.

She won her second Women's Lithuanian Chess Championship in 2020, 28 years after her first in 1992. In 2025 she won silver medal in Women's Lithuanian Chess Championship.
