= Wissam Toubal =

Algerian chess player (born 1984)

Personal information
- Born: 18 January 1984 (age 42)

Chess career
- Country: Algeria
- Title: Woman International Master (2005)
- FIDE rating: 1926 (February 2013)
- Peak rating: 2062 (July 2003)

Wissam Toubal (born 18 January 1984) is an Algerian chess player who holds the FIDE title of Woman International Master (WIM, 2005).

== Biography ==
Toubal participated in World Youth Chess Championships in various age groups. In 2001, in Cairo she won bronze medal in African Women's Chess Championship. In 2001, she participated in Women's World Chess Championship by knock-out system and in the first round lost to Alisa Galliamova. In 2003, Toubal played for Algeria in All-Africa Games chess tournament and won team and individual gold medals. In 2005, she won 3rd place in the Women's World Chess Championship Africa Zonal tournament.

She played for Algeria in the Women's Chess Olympiads:

- In 2002, at first reserve board in the 35th Chess Olympiad (women) in Bled (+1, =2, -2).
- In 2006, at first board in the 37th Chess Olympiad (women) in Turin (+6, =0, -6).

In 2005, Toubal was awarded the FIDE Woman International Master (WIM) title.
