= Elena Köpke =

German chess player (born 1984)

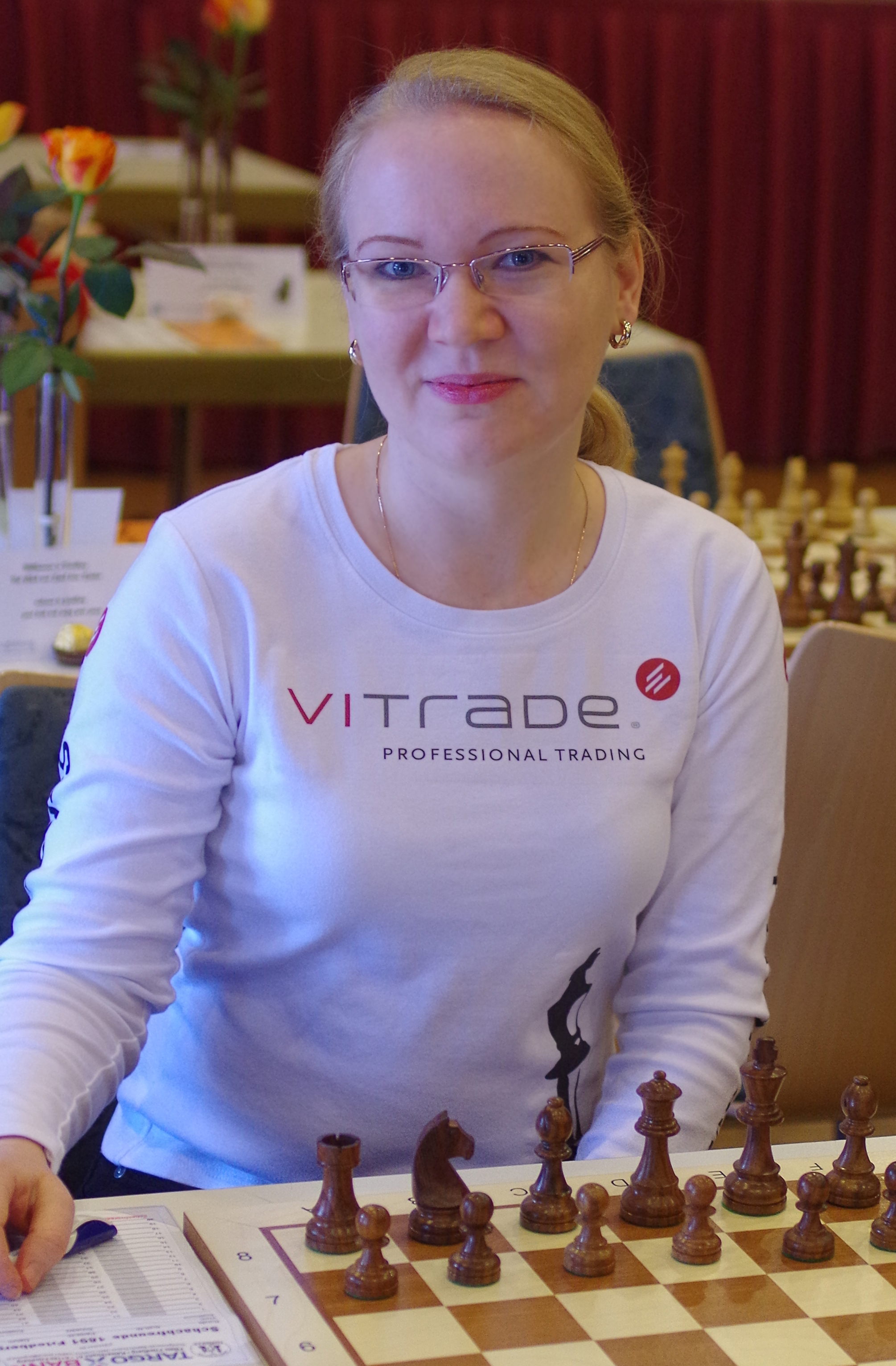
- Köpke in 2013

Personal information
- Born: 27 February 1984 (age 42) Tashkent, Uzbekistan

Chess career
- Country: Uzbekistan (until 2003); Germany (since 2003)
- Title: Woman Grandmaster (2007)
- Peak rating: 2346 (September 2010)

Elena Köpke (née Levushkina, born 27 February 1984) is an Uzbekistan-born German chess player who holds the FIDE title of Woman Grandmaster (WGM, 2007).

== Biography ==
Köpke participated in World Youth Chess Championships in various girl's age groups, who twice ranked in the top ten (1998, 2000). In 2001, she ranked 9th in Asian Women's Chess Championship. In 2001, she participated in Women's World Chess Championship by knock-out system and in the first round lost to Alisa Marić.

Since 2002, she lives in Munich and represent Germany. In 2006, she won the Bavaria Junior Chess Championship in the U25 age group for men. In 2014, she won Bad Ragaz international chess tournament Osteropen 2014.

Köpke played for Uzbekistan and Germany:

- in Women's Chess Olympiad participated 3 times (2000, 2010-2012);
- in Women's Asian Team Chess Championship participated in 1999;
- in European Women's Team Chess Championships participated 2 times (2011, 2017).

In 2001, she was awarded the FIDE Woman International Master (WIM) title and received the FIDE Woman Grandmaster (WGM) title six year later.

She graduated from LMU Munich with a doctorate in computational linguistics.
