= Australian Women's Masters (chess) =

The Australian Women's Masters is a chess tournament that has been held in Melbourne, Australia, annually since January 2013. The tournament is an invitational event, normally run as a 10-player round-robin tournament. The regular organisers and sponsors of the tournament have been Gary Bekker and Jamie Kenmure.

== Winners ==
- 2017 (Germany) Emily Rosmait
- 2016 (China) Gu Xiaobing
- 2015 (Russia) Julia Ryjanova
- 2014 (Indonesia) Irine Kharisma Sukandar
- 2013 (Australia) Katherine Jarek

== See also ==
- Women's chess in Australia
