= Natalia Straub =

German chess player (born 1978)

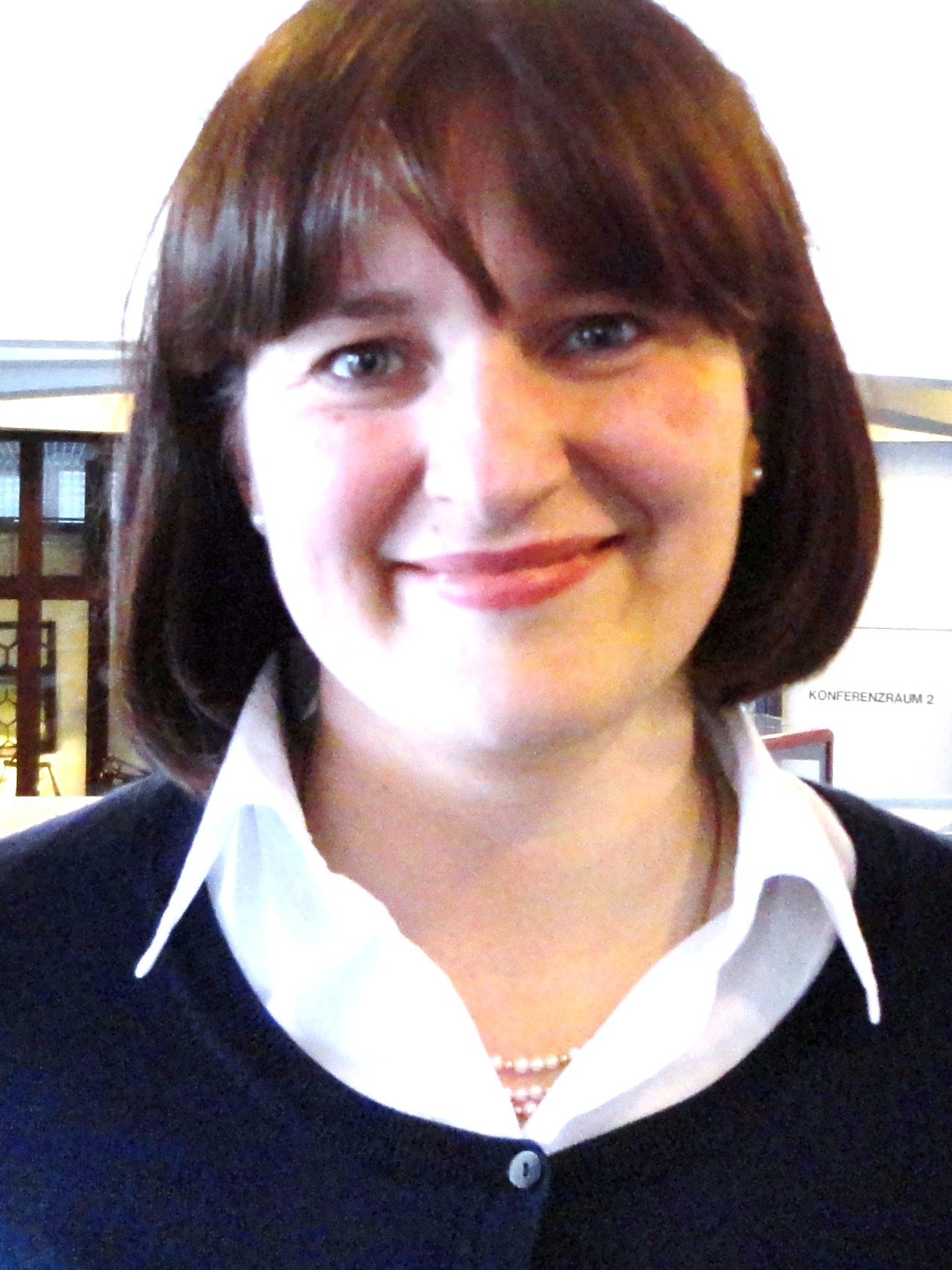
- Straub in 2012

Personal information
- Born: 27 May 1978 (age 48) Luhansk, Ukraine

Chess career
- Country: Ukraine; Germany
- Title: Woman Grandmaster (1998)
- FIDE rating: 2132 (October 2021)
- Peak rating: 2382 (July 2001)

Natalia Straub (née Kiseleva, born 27 May 1978) is a Ukraine-born German (since 2007) chess player. She received the FIDE title of Woman Grandmaster (WGM) in 1998.

== Career ==
Straub participated in European Youth Chess Championships and World Youth Chess Championships, where best result was gold medal in European Youth Chess Championship in girls age group U16 in Szombathely in 1993. In 1995, at Interzonal Tournament in Chişinău she has taken 37th place. In 1994, she won Ukrainian Women's Chess Championship. In 1996, in Kraków she won International Chess tournament Cracovia, as well as shared 3rd place in International Chess tournament in Frýdek-Místek. In 2000, in Baden-Württemberg won 2nd place in International Chess tournament (tournament won Joanna Dworakowska). In 2001, Natalia Straub participated in Women's World Chess Championship by knock-out system and in the first round won to Wang Yu but in second round lost to Alisa Galliamova. In 2003, in Athens International Chess tournament Acropolis shared 3rd with Nino Khurtsidze behind winner Yelena Dembo and Margarita Voiska.
