= 33rd Chess Olympiad =

1998 chess tournament in Elista, Russia

Official logo of the Olympiad

Official mascot of the Olympiad

The 33rd Chess Olympiad (33-я Шахматная олимпиада, 33-ya Shakhmatnaya olimpiada; Kalmyk: 33-гче Шатрин олимпиад, 33-gçe Şatrin olimpiad), organized by FIDE and comprising an open and a women's tournament, took place between September 26 and October 13, 1998, in Elista, Kalmykia, Russia. There were 110 teams in the open event and 72 in the women's event.

The Olympiad was the first international chess event to be held at Chess City. Construction of the complex was not complete by the start of the tournament, and some FIDE members were concerned that the facilities would not be ready in time, including the airport, telephone system, player housing, and the "Chess Palace" to be used as the main playing hall.

Reported human rights abuses by FIDE and Kalmykia president Kirsan Ilyumzhinov led to calls for a boycott from Valery Borshchev, a member of the Duma. The British government did not call for a boycott but confirmed "reliable reports of human rights problems" and suggested that Kalmykian authorities might use publicity from Olympiad participation by foreign teams for its own purposes. Three nations were signed up but chose to stay away: Denmark, Norway, and Slovakia.

The opening ceremony took place as scheduled, but the Chess Palace was still covered in scaffolding and was missing many windows. The first round was delayed, one free day was eliminated, and the tournament was shortened to 13 rounds from the planned 14. The organizers worked around the clock and playing conditions improved as the tournament progressed, although the main playing hall was not properly heated. Living conditions, food and drink, and telephone service were generally reported to be acceptable.

Both tournament sections were officiated by International Arbiter Geurt Gijssen (Netherlands). Teams were paired across the 13 rounds of competition according to the Swiss system. The open division was played over four boards per round, whilst the women's was played over three. In the event of a draw, the tie-break was decided by 1. the Buchholz system; and 2. match points.

The time control for each game permitted each player 100 minutes to make their first 40 moves, then an additional 50 minutes to make the next 20 moves, and then 10 minutes to finish the game, with an additional 30 seconds devolving on each player after each move, beginning with the first.

In addition to the overall medal winners, the teams were divided into seeding groups, with the top finishers in each group receiving special prizes.

== Open event ==
The open division was contested by 110 teams representing 106 nations. Russia, as hosts, fielded an unprecedented four teams (Russia "C" was referred to as "Team Kalmykia" and Russia "D" was a youth team), whilst the International Braille Chess Association provided one squad.

Even without their strongest players, the "Three Ks" (PCA world champion Garry Kasparov, FIDE champion Anatoly Karpov and Vladimir Kramnik), Russia were still favourites, and the team did win their fourth consecutive title. The United States improved another spot from the previous Olympiad and finished second, and Ukraine took the bronze medals, beating Israel on tiebreak.

Open event
#	Country	Players	Average rating	Points	Buchholz
1	Russia	Svidler, Rublevsky, Bareev, Morozevich, Zvjaginsev, Sakaev	2684	35½	
2	United States	Yermolinsky, Shabalov, Seirawan, Gulko, De Firmian, Kaidanov	2631	34½	
3	Ukraine	Ivanchuk, Onischuk, Romanishin, Malaniuk, Savchenko, Ponomariov	2638	32½	394.0
4	Israel	Alterman, Smirin, Sutovsky, Psakhis, Kosashvili, Avrukh	2593	32½	379.0
5	China	Peng Xiaomin, Ye Jiangchuan, Zhang Zhong, Yu Shaoteng, Wu Wenjin, Wang Rui	2498	31½	389.5
6	Germany	Yusupov, Dautov, Lutz, Hübner, Gabriel, Luther	2610	31½	386.5
7	Georgia	Azmaiparashvili, Giorgadze, Sturua, Bagaturov, Supatashvili, Janjgava	2601	31½	377.5
8	Russia "B"	Dreev, Filippov, Volkov, Kobalia, Yemelin, Shariyazdanov	2594	31	395.5
9	Hungary	Almási, Pintér, C. Horváth, J. Horváth, Varga, Gyimesi	2588	31	375.0
10	Romania	Istrățescu, Marin, Nisipeanu, Ionescu, Nevednichy, Vajda	2548	30½	392.5

#	Country	Average rating	Points	Buchholz	MP
11	England	2661	30½	390.5	
12	Netherlands	2605	30½	380.5	
13	Belarus	2555	30½	378.5	
14	Latvia	2533	30½	369.5	
15	Poland	2564	30½	361.5	
16	Armenia	2630	30	397.5	
17	Bulgaria	2626	30	393.0	
18	Yugoslavia	2563	30	367.5	
19	Kazakhstan	2519	30	359.5	
=20	Sweden	2546	29½	372.0	16
=20	Czech Republic	2565	29½	372.0	16
22	Lithuania	2539	29½	368.0	
23	Slovenia	2515	29½	357.5	
24	Cuba	2519	29	379.5	
25	Croatia	2559	29	363.0	
26	France	2585	28½	383.5	
27	Uzbekistan	2525	28½	373.5	
28	Argentina	2545	28½	372.0	
29	Spain	2601	28½	370.5	
30	Bosnia and Herzegovina	2590	28½	368.0	
31	Switzerland	2509	28½	364.5	
32	Russia "C"	2470	28½	357.5	
33	India	2491	28½	353.0	
34	Mexico	2464	28½	343.0	
35	Philippines	2443	28	368.5	
36	Greece	2531	28	366.5	
37	Moldova	2511	28	364.5	
38	Egypt	2371	28	338.5	
39	Kyrgyzstan	2495	27½	373.5	
40	Estonia	2580	27½	370.5	
41	Italy	2488	27½	360.0	
42	Canada	2466	27½	358.5	
43	Azerbaijan	2474	27½	356.0	
44	Albania	2418	27½	354.0	14
45	Finland	2420	27½	354.0	12
46	North Macedonia	2499	27½	352.5	
47	Tajikistan	2376	27½	348.5	
48	Brazil	2485	27½	348.0	
49	Mongolia	2370	27½	341.5	
50	Austria	2390	27	360.0	
51	Iceland	2489	27	355.0	
52	IBCA	2263	27	339.5	
53	Bangladesh	2384	26½	353.5	
54	Belgium	2335	26½	351.0	
55	Vietnam	2464	26½	348.5	
56	New Zealand	2286	26½	323.0	
57	Colombia	2445	26	356.0	
58	Ireland	2349	26	343.5	
59	Iran	2374	26	339.0	
60	Luxembourg	2339	26	333.0	
61	Chile	2415	26	331.0	
62	Angola	2229	26	313.5	
63	Australia	2405	25½	342.0	
64	Peru	2398	25½	337.5	
65	Venezuela	2314	25½	334.5	
66	Scotland	2348	25½	334.0	
67	Portugal	2418	25½	333.5	
68	Wales	2275	25½	320.0	
69	Nigeria	2256	25½	318.5	
70	Turkey	2444	25		
71	Turkmenistan	2431	24½	352.5	
72	Faroe Islands	2233	24½	341.5	
73	Iraq	2301	24½	329.0	
74	Malaysia	2075	24	321.0	
75	United Arab Emirates	2223	24	316.5	
76	Puerto Rico	2238	24	313.5	
77	Andorra	2276	24	308.5	
78	Jamaica	2066	24	307.5	
79	Ecuador	2254	23½	330.0	
80	South Africa	2318	23½	326.0	
81	Zimbabwe	2184	23½	316.0	
82	Russia "D"	2215	23½	315.5	
83	Kenya	2035	23½	302.0	
84	Yemen	2246	23	328.5	
85	Bolivia	2148	23	315.0	
86	Libya	2000	23	301.0	
87	Cyprus	2243	23	299.0	
88	Singapore	2129	23	294.5	
89	Qatar	2276	22½	317.5	
90	Trinidad and Tobago	2118	22½	312.0	
91	El Salvador	2076	22½	305.5	
92	Japan	2191	22½	303.5	
93	Uganda	2045	22½	296.0	
94	Lebanon	2191	22	323.0	
95	Palestine	2184	22	288.5	
96	San Marino	2149	22	276.0	
97	Honduras	2078	22	270.0	
98	Nicaragua	2151	21½	296.5	
99	Barbados	2054	21½	272.0	
100	Macau	2148	21½	268.0	
101	Botswana	2045	21		
102	Malta	2134	20½	293.0	
103	Namibia	2060	20½	273.0	
104	Mali	2049	20½	261.5	
105	Jersey	2081	20	265.5	
106	Afghanistan	2000	20	260.0	
107	Netherlands Antilles	2043	19		
108	Guernsey	2090	18½		
109	Seychelles	2060	18		
110	United States Virgin Islands	2000	3		

=== Individual medals ===
- Performance rating: (Georgia (country)) Zurab Azmaiparashvili 2804
- Board 1: (Qatar) Mohamad Al-Modiahki 7½ / 8 = 93.8%
- Board 2: (Nigeria) Odion Aikhoje 6½ / 8 = 81.3%
- Board 3: (Cuba) Reynaldo Vera González 7 / 9 = 77.8%
- Board 4: (Yemen) Hamaid Gadhi 6½ / 8 = 81.3%
- 1st reserve: (Scotland) Andrew Muir 6 / 7 = 85.7%
- 2nd reserve: (Israel) Boris Avrukh 8 / 10 = 80.0%

== Women's event ==
The women's division was contested by 72 teams representing 69 nations. Russia, as hosts, fielded three teams, whilst the International Braille Chess Association entered one squad.

China finally broke the Eastern European dominance by winning the title, led by former (and future) world champion Xie Jun and future champion Zhu Chen. Russia took the silver, whilst defending quadruple champions Georgia had to settle for bronze.

#	Country	Players	Average rating	Points	Buchholz
1	China	Xie Jun, Zhu Chen, Wang Pin, Wang Lei	2480	29	
2	Russia	Matveeva, Kovalevskaya, Shumiakina, Stepovaya-Dianchenko	2438	27	295.0
3	Georgia	Chiburdanidze, Ioseliani, Arakhamia-Grant, Khurtsidze	2480	27	289.5
4	Netherlands	Peng Zhaoqin, Sziva, Bosboom-Lanchava, Jap Tjoen San	2325	23½	290.0
5	Bulgaria	Stefanova, Voiska, Velcheva, Aleksieva	2387	23½	277.0
6	Romania	Peptan, Foișor, Cosma, Olărașu	2398	23	299.0
7	Yugoslavia	Marić, Bojković, Vuksanović, Manakova	2422	23	293.5
8	Hungary	Lakos, Mádl, Grábics, Medvegy	2383	23	279.5
9	Russia "C"	Demina, Kosteniuk, Kharashkina, Gelashvili	2205	23	275.0
10	United States	Belakovskaia, Krush, Epstein, Donaldson-Akhmilovskaya	2355	23	271.5

#	Country	Average rating	Points	Buchholz	MP
11	Poland	2428	22½	300.5	
12	Ukraine	2430	22½	289.0	
13	Latvia	2183	22½	282.5	
14	Vietnam	2258	22½	281.0	
15	India	2252	22½	266.5	
16	Germany	2345	22	283.0	
17	Estonia	2292	22	281.5	
18	Israel	2322	22	281.0	14
19	Greece	2247	22	281.0	13
20	England	2323	22	269.0	
21	Armenia	2288	21½	277.0	
22	Moldova	2322	21½	274.5	
23	Kazakhstan	2258	21½	272.5	
24	Czech Republic	2262	21	281.0	
25	Uzbekistan	2203	21	280.0	
26	Russia "B"	2358	21	271.5	
27	France	2237	21	251.0	
28	Cuba	2298	20½	284.0	
29	Croatia	2263	20½	272.0	
30	Azerbaijan	2052	20½	265.5	
31	Argentina	2188	20½	256.0	
32	Belarus	2253	20	269.0	
33	Finland	2157	20	267.0	
34	North Macedonia	2110	20	257.0	
35	Sweden	2120	20	256.5	
36	Slovenia	2223	20	256.0	
37	Lithuania	2198	19½	280.5	
38	Spain	2222	19½	269.5	
39	Slovakia	2227	19½	267.5	
40	Bosnia and Herzegovina	2240	19½	265.5	
41	Bangladesh	2097	19½	254.0	
42	Turkmenistan	2227	19½	251.5	
43	Turkey	2022	19½	233.0	
44	Austria	2098	19	257.5	
45	Mongolia	2192	19	247.5	
46	Mexico	2098	19	244.0	
47	Australia	2080	18½	253.5	
48	Philippines	2000	18½	247.5	
49	IBCA	2080	18½	241.5	
50	United Arab Emirates	2000	18½	208.0	
51	Ireland	2000	18½	190.5	
52	Switzerland	2127	18	245.0	11
53	Brazil	2080	18	245.0	10
54	Venezuela	2133	18	244.5	13
55	Portugal	2068	18	244.5	9
56	Iran	2008	18	222.0	
57	Iraq	2063	18	219.5	
58	Colombia	2025	17½	232.5	
59	El Salvador	2000	17½	202.0	
60	Scotland	2017	17	246.0	
61	Italy	2045	17	239.0	
62	South Africa	2000	17	217.5	
63	Nigeria	2000	17	213.5	
64	Wales	2037	16½	224.5	
65	Puerto Rico	2000	16½	192.0	
66	New Zealand	2023	15½		
67	Botswana	2000	15		
68	Angola	2000	13		
69	Japan	2017	12		
70	United States Virgin Islands	2000	9½		
71	Lebanon	2000	8½		
72	Macau	2000	2½		

=== Individual medals ===
- Performance rating: (China) Wang Lei 2618
- Board 1: (Turkmenistan) Mähri Ovezova 10½ / 13 = 80.8%
- Board 2: (Iraq) Eman Hassane Al-Rufei 8 / 9 = 88.9%
- Board 3: (Russia) Tatiana Shumiakina 6½ / 8 = 81.3%
- Reserve: (Russia) Tatiana Stepovaya-Dianchenko and (China) Wang Lei 8 / 9 = 88.9%

== Overall title ==
The Nona Gaprindashvili Trophy is awarded to the nation that has the best average rank in the open and women's divisions. Where two or more teams are tied, they are ordered by best single finish in either division and then by total number of points scored.

The trophy, named after the former women's world champion (1961–78), was created by FIDE in 1997 and awarded for the first time in Elista.

#	Team	Open division	Women's division	Average
1	Russia	1	2	1½
2	China	5	1	3
3	Georgia	7	3	5

== Notes ==
- Justin Corfield, The History of Kalmykia: From Ancient Times to Kirsan Ilyumzhinov and Aleksey Orlov, 2015. The Olympiad is covered in p. 163-170. ISBN 978-1-876586-29-4.
- Carol Jarecki, "Reports from the 33rd Olympiad, Elista, Kalmyk Republic", Chess Life Online
