= Miranda Khorava =

Georgian chess player (born 1977)

Personal information
- Born: 19 November 1977 (age 48)

Chess career
- Country: Georgia
- Title: Woman International Master (1995)
- Peak rating: 2295 (January 1996)

Miranda Khorava (Georgian: ხორავა მირანდა; born 19 November 1977) is a Georgian chess player who holds the FIDE title of Woman International Master (WIM, 1995). She is a winner of Georgian Women's Chess Championship (1995).

== Biography ==
In the late 1990s Miranda Khorava was one of Georgian leading female chess players. She participated in European Youth Chess Championships and World Youth Chess Championships. In 1995, Miranda Khorava won Georgian Women's Chess Championship. In 1995, Miranda Khorava participated in Women's World Chess Championship Interzonal Tournament in Chişinău where ranked 23rd place.

In 1995, she was awarded the FIDE Woman International Master (WIM) title.
