= Sharon Ellen Burtman =

American chess player (born 1968)

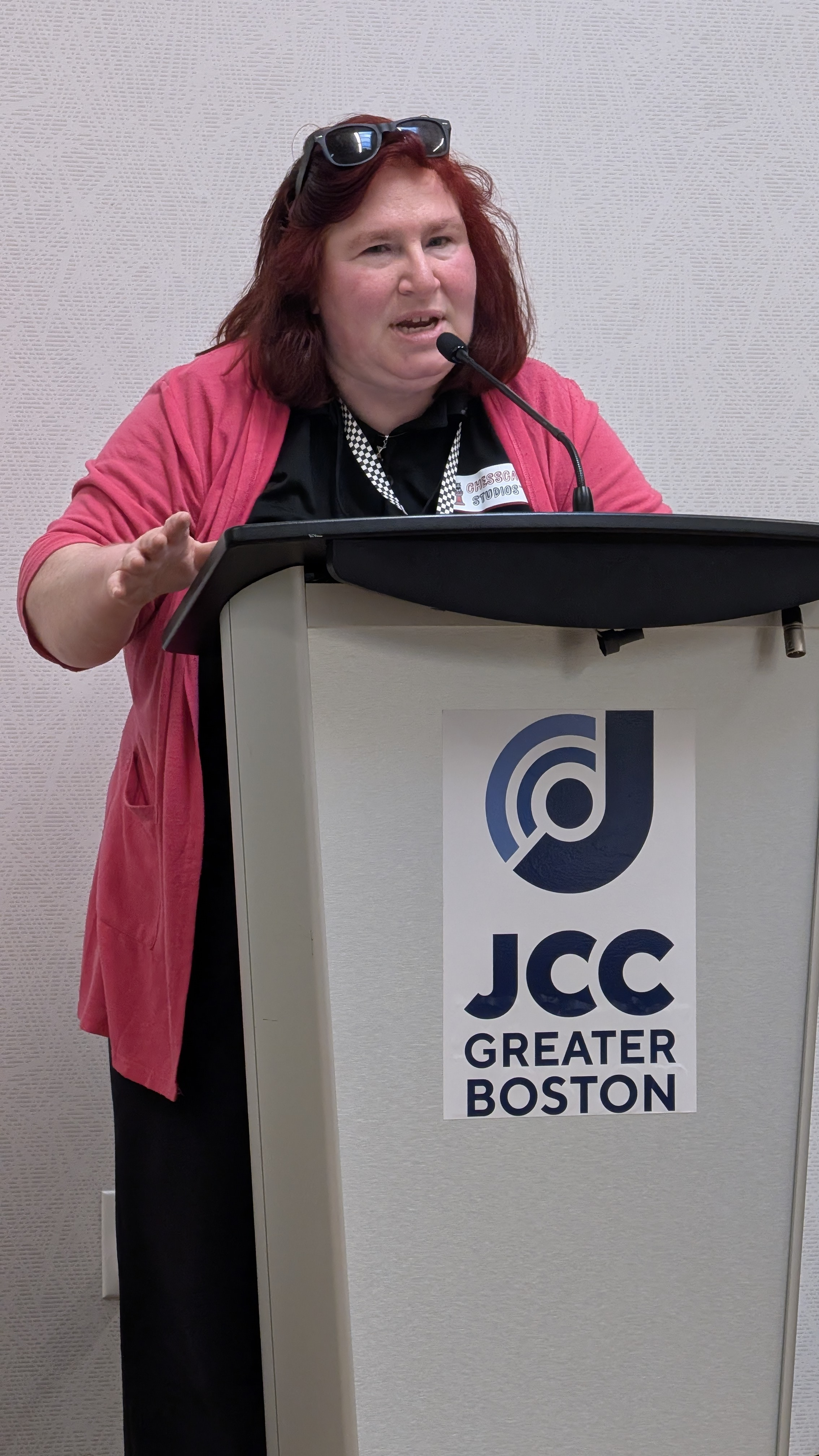
- Burtman at a chess tournament in Boston

Personal information
- Born: June 16, 1968 (age 58) Boston, Massachusetts

Chess career
- Country: United States
- Title: Woman International Master (1989)
- Peak rating: 2123 (January 1999)

Sharon Ellen Burtman (born 1968) is an American chess player. Her titles include National Master (1994); Woman International Master (1989); New England Women's Champion (1988); and United States Women's Champion (1995, shared with Anjelina Belakovskaia).

Burtman has twice represented the United States in the Interzonal tournaments (1990 and 1995).

In team competition, she was captain of the Rhode Island College chess team, leading them to the Best College prize at each U.S. Amateur Team Championship (East) from 1987 through 1991. Burtman was also a member of the "Censure Countergambit" team, which won the U.S. Amateur Team Championship (West) in 1999.

Burtman was twice awarded the Paul M. Albert, Jr. Brilliancy Prize. The first time was for her Round 7 win over Mary Kuhner at the 1987 U.S. Women's Championship in Estes Park, CO; the second for her Round 4 victory over Elizabeth Neely at the 1991 U.S. Women's Championship in Highland Beach, FL.

On June 16, 2021, National Master John MacArthur organized (and won) a five-round rapid chess tournament on Lichess named the "Sharon Burtman Birthday Swiss".
