= Lin Ye (chess player) =

Chinese chess player (born 1974)

Personal information
- Born: 1974 (age 51–52)

Chess career
- Country: China
- Title: Woman FIDE Master (1995)
- Peak rating: 2220 (July 1996)

Lin Ye (Chinese: 林燁; pinyin: Lin Ye; born 1974) is a Chinese chess player, Woman FIDE Master (WFM), and chess arbiter.

== Biography ==
In 1995, Lin Ye participated in Women's World Chess Championship Interzonal Tournament in Chişinău where ranked 40th place.

Lin Ye is known as a prominent chess tournament arbiter. In 2008, she became a FIDE Arbiter (FA), and in 2011 she received the International Arbiter (IA) title. She was a 2010 Asian Games chess tournament arbiter and 2011 Summer Universiade chess tournament arbiter.
