= Wang Pin =

Chinese chess player (born 1974)

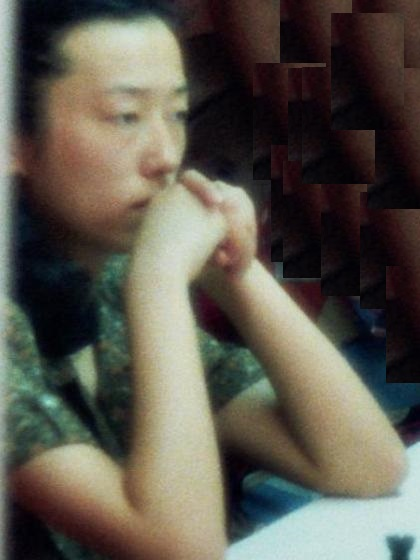
- Wang Pin, Manila 1992

Personal information
- Born: December 11, 1974 (age 51) Shanghai, China

Chess career
- Country: China
- Title: Woman Grandmaster (1992)
- FIDE rating: 2387 (January 2019)
- Peak rating: 2506 (October 2000)
- Peak ranking: No. 6 woman (January 2001)

Wang Pin (Chinese: 王频; born December 11, 1974) is a Chinese chess player. She was awarded the title of Woman Grandmaster by FIDE in 1992. Wang was the Chinese national women's champion of 2002.

By finishing fifth in the 1991 Women's Interzonal Tournament, she qualified to play in the 1992 Women's Candidates Tournament, a stage of the Women's World Chess Championship 1993, and finished tied for last place. In 1993, Wang took part in the Women's Interzonal Tournament again and tied for 9th-11th places. Since the format of the Women's World Chess Championship was changed to a knockout tournament, she competed in the event in 2001 and 2004.

She played for the China national chess team four times at the Women's Chess Olympiad (1992, 1996, 1998, 2002), winning the team gold medal in 1998 and 2002, silver in 1996 and bronze in 1992. Wang represented China also the Women's Asian Team Chess Championship in 1999, winning two gold medals (team and individual on board 2), and in the Russia vs China match in 2001.

== See also ==
- Chess in China

Preceded by Wang Lei	Women's Chinese Chess Champion; 2002	Succeeded by Xu Yuanyuan
