= Natia Janjgava =

Georgian chess player (born 1972)

Personal information
- Born: 16 December 1972 (age 53)

Chess career
- Country: Georgia
- Title: Woman International Master (1995)
- Peak rating: 2306 (July 2011)

Natia Janjgava (Georgian: ჯანჯღავა ნათია; born 16 December 1972) is a Georgian chess player who holds the FIDE title of Woman International Master (WIM, 1995). She is a winner of Georgian Women's Chess Championship (1994).

== Biography ==
In 1990, Natia Janjgava participated in USSR Women's Chess Championship final and ranked 18th place. She participated in European Youth Chess Championships and World Youth Chess Championships where best result reached in 1991 in U20 girl's age group when ranked in 5th place. In 1993, in Polička, she shared first place in International Women's chess tournament. In 1994, she won Georgian Women's Chess Championship. In 1995, Janjgava participated in Women's World Chess Championship Interzonal Tournament in Chişinău where ranked 49th place.

In 1995, Janjgava was awarded the FIDE Woman International Master (WIM) title.
