= Xu Yuanyuan =

Chinese chess player (born 1981)

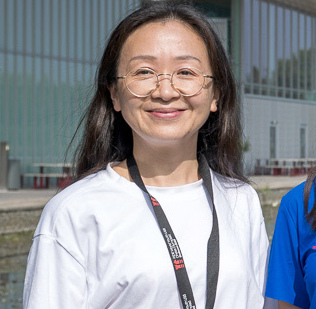
- Xu in 2023

Personal information
- Born: March 8, 1981 (age 45) Hefei, Anhui, China

Chess career
- Country: China
- Title: Woman Grandmaster (2003)
- Peak rating: 2437 (January 2001)

Xu Yuanyuan (Chinese: 徐媛媛; born March 8, 1981) is a Chinese WGM-titled chess player.

== Chess career ==
In 1995 Xu won the World U14 Girls Chess Championship held in São Lourenço, Minas Gerais, Brazil. In October 1997 she won the World U16 Girls Chess Championship in Yerevan, and in 2000, also in Yerevan, she won the World Junior Girls U-20 Championship by a large margin – she began with seven consecutive wins and finished with a score of 11/13.

On July 11–21, 2003, Xu won the China Women's National Chess Championship (FIDE Zone 3.3 qualifier) held in Yongchuan District, Chongqing, with a final score of 6.5/9. In November 2003, Xu won the Chinese Women's Individual Chess Championship in Shan Wei with a final score of 8.5/11. In April–May 2004, she came joint third in the Chinese Women's Team Chess Championship in Jinan City.

She used to be the No. 1 ranked girl chess player in the world on the January 2001 Top 20 Girls FIDE rating list. Her highest position on the Top 50 Women FIDE rating list was 25th (also in January 2001).

Xu Yuanyuan's daughter, IM Lu Miaoyi, represented China at the 45th Chess Olympiad at the age of 14.

Xu Yuanyuan is an official representative of Aigo. "Aigo Chess" is a chess variant created in 2004 by the president of the company. The idea consisted of introducing a piece from Chinese chess called "cannon" into the chess game.

=== Opening repertoire ===
Xu Yuanyuan usually opens with white with 1. d4, and replies to it as black with the Slav. With black against 1. e4 she usually plays the Caro–Kann Defence.

== See also ==
- Chess in China

Preceded by Wang Pin	Women's Chinese Chess Champion; 2003	Succeeded by Qin Kanying
