= Corina Peptan =

Romanian chess player (born 1978)

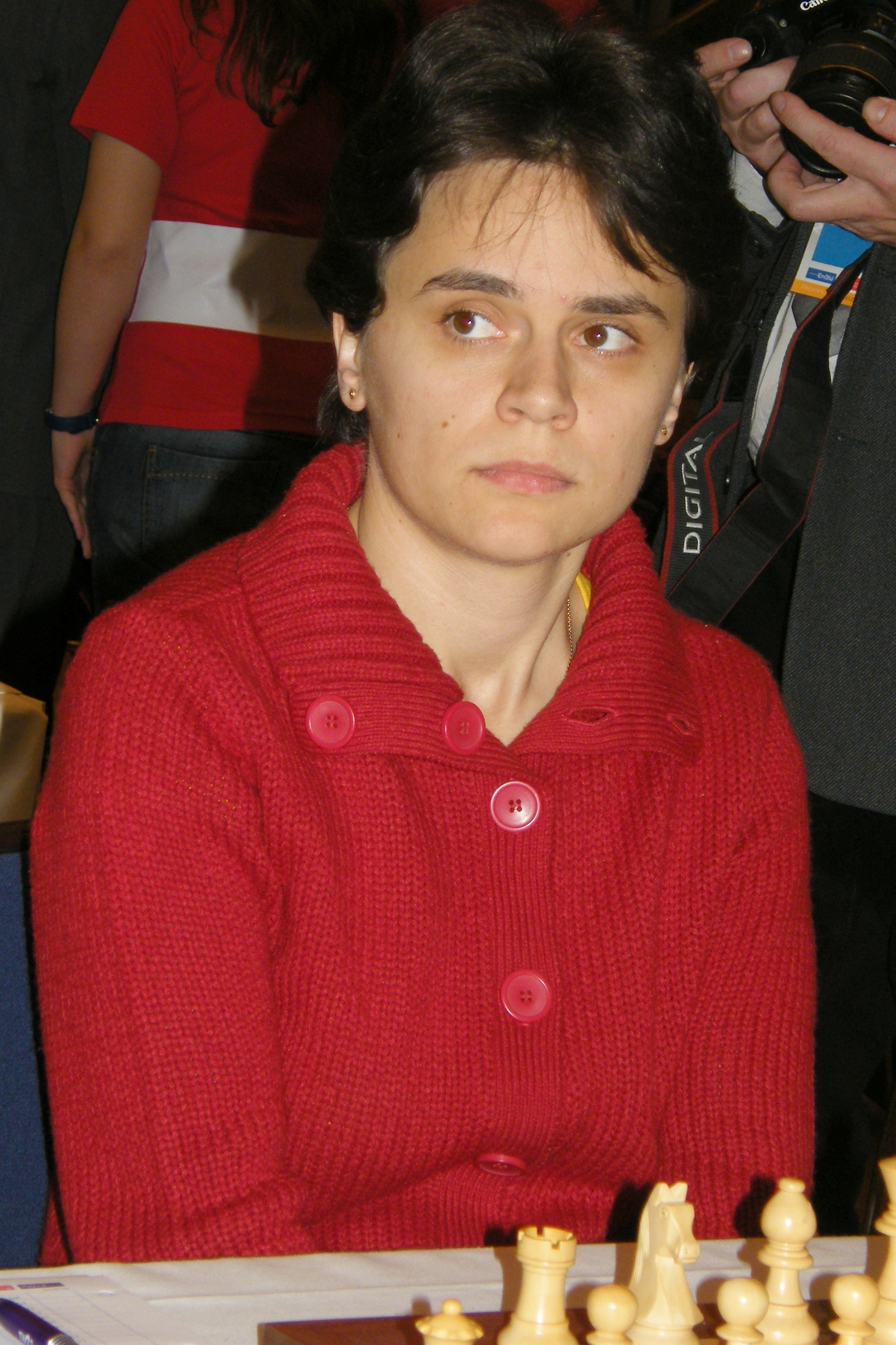
- at 38th Chess Olympiad in Dresden

Personal information
- Born: Corina-Isabela Peptan; March 17, 1978 (age 48) Bumbești-Jiu, Romania

Chess career
- Country: Romania
- Title: International Master (2002); Woman Grandmaster (1995)
- Peak rating: 2485 (July 2003)

Corina-Isabela Peptan (born March 17, 1978) is a Romanian chess player holding the titles of International Master (IM) and Woman Grandmaster (WGM).

She was world girls' champion in several age categories: Under 10 in Timișoara 1988, Under 12 in Fond du Lac 1990, Under 14 in Warsaw 1991, and Under 18 in Guarapuava 1995.

Peptan won the Romanian women's championship thirteen times (1994, 1995, 1997, 2000, 2004, 2007, 2008, 2009, 2014, 2015, 2017, 2019 and 2026). She competed in the Women's World Chess Championship in 2000, 2001 and 2004. She reached the quarterfinals in 2000.

In team events, Peptan has represented Romania in the Women's Chess Olympiad, Women's European Team Chess Championship, Women's Chess Balkaniads and Girls' Chess Balkaniads. She has won two individual silver medals at the olympiad, in Moscow 1994 (playing board three) and Calvià 2004 (board two). In the European Club Cup for Women, she played for the victorious team AEM-Luxten Timișoara in 1998.
