= Elista =

City in the Republic of Kalmykia, Russia

Elista Элиста Stepnoy (Степной) (Former name)
- City

Other transcription(s)
  - Kalmyk: Элст
  - Former name: Stepnoy (Степной)
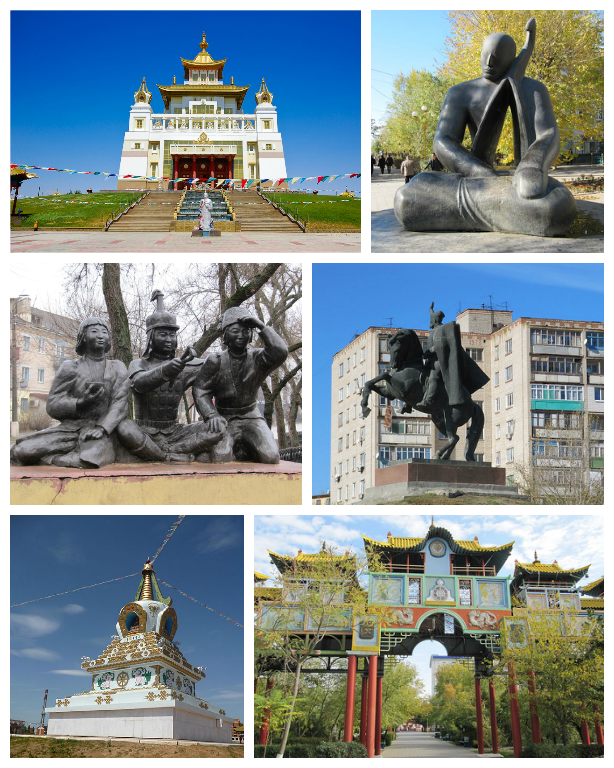
- From top, left to right: Golden Temple, Echo Monument, Three Little Heroes Monument, Monument to Oka Gorodovikov, Stupa of enlightenment, Golden Door

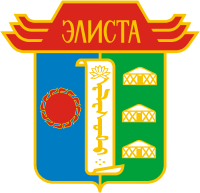
- Flag Coat of arms
- Interactive map of Elista
- Location of Elista Elista (Kalmykia) Elista (Russia) Elista (Europe)
- Coordinates: 46°19′N 44°16′E
- Country: Russia
- Federal subject: Kalmykia
- Founded: 1865

Government
  - Leader: Shafran Tepshinov (acting)
- Elevation: 120 m (390 ft)

Population (2010 Census)
  - Total: 103,749
  - Estimate (2025): 104,082 (+0.3%)
  - Rank: 156th in 2010

Administrative status
  - Subordinated to: City of Elista
  - Capital of: Republic of Kalmykia
  - Capital of: City of Elista

Municipal status
  - Urban okrug: Elista Urban Okrug
  - Capital of: Elista Urban Okrug
- Time zone: UTC+3 (MSK)
- Postal code: 358000–358014
- Dialing code: +7 84722
- OKTMO ID: 85701000001
- Website: www.gorod-elista.ru

Elista (Russian: Элиста́, [ɪlʲɪˈsta]; (Note: Most common pronunciation used after 1992 and in Kalmykia itself. The pronunciation Эли́ста [ɪˈlʲistə] was common during the Soviet era.) Kalmyk: Элст, Elst, [ɛləsˈtə]) is the capital city of the Republic of Kalmykia, Russia.

It was known as Stepnoy (Степно́й) from 1944 to 1957.

== History ==
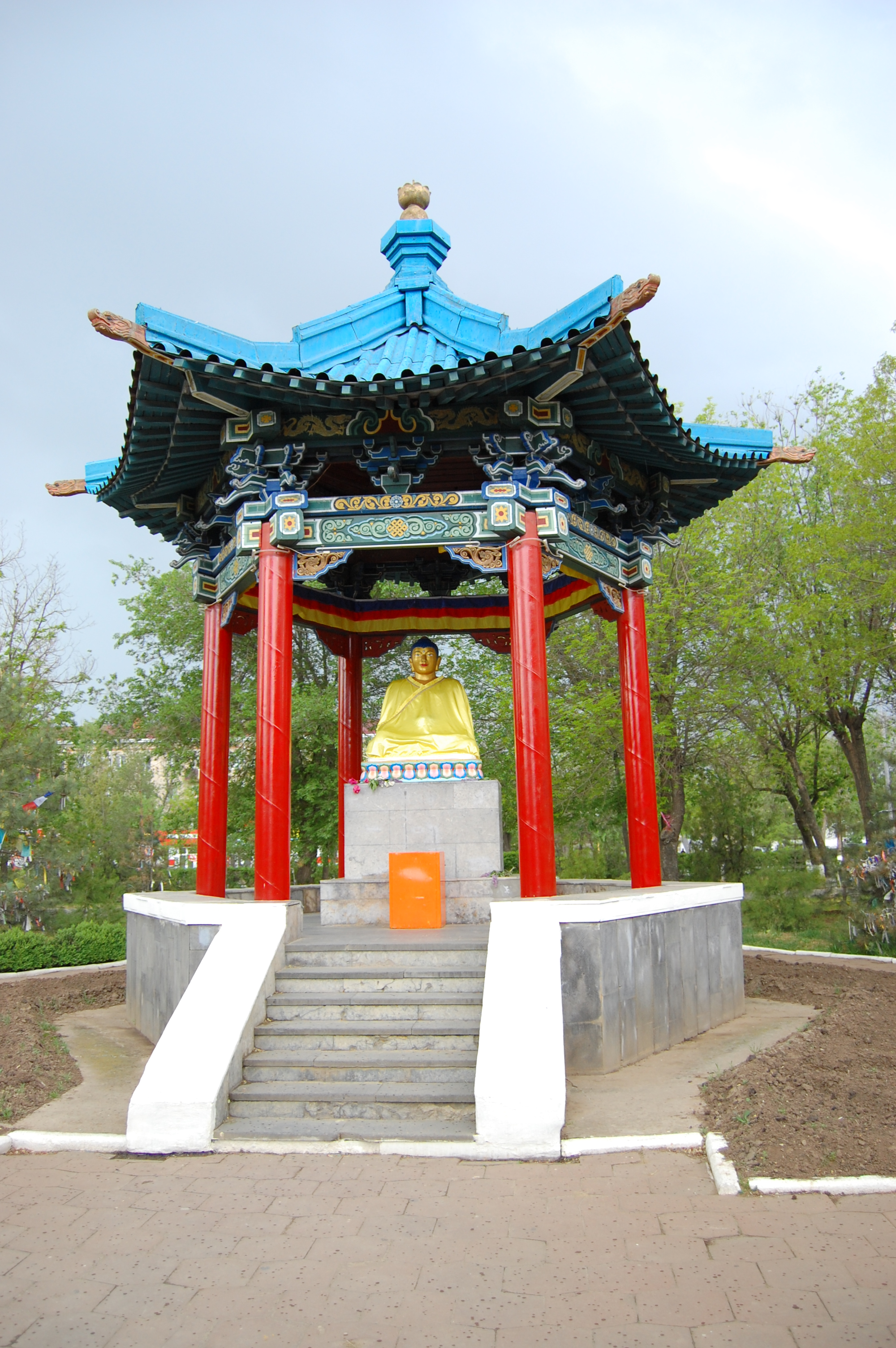
A representation of the Buddha

Elista was founded in 1865 as a small settlement, the name is from Kalmyk els(e)n 'sand(y)'. In November 1920, Elista became the administrative center of the Kalmyk Autonomous Oblast. By the early 1930s, Elista was transformed into a small city as the collectivization policies of Joseph Stalin forced many Kalmyks to abandon their traditional pastoral nomadic lifestyle in exchange for a modern, sedentary, and urban lifestyle. In October 1935, Elista was recognized as the capital of the Kalmyk ASSR. In late 1942, the city was briefly occupied by the German army. Because of alleged collaboration between the ethnic Kalmyks and the Germans, on 27 December 1943 the Kalmyk ASSR was dissolved and its ethnic Kalmyk residents were forcibly exiled to Siberia. Russian people were brought in to repopulate Elista, whose name was changed to Stepnoy (Степно́й). It was called Stepnoy until 1957, when the survivors of the deportations were allowed to return from exile.

Some western tourists started to visit Elista from the mid-1990s, and more after it received publicity as the host city of the 1998 Chess Olympiad. The city is safe and has little traffic. On the outskirts of Elista, there are vast grasslands.

== Geography ==
The city is located in the area of the Yergeni hills, in the upper part of the Elista valley. The sources of the river are located in the western part of the city. The Elista crosses the urban area from west to east, dividing it into two sections, a larger northern part and a smaller southern one.

=== Climate ===
Elista has a hot-summer humid continental climate (Köppen Dfa), bordering upon a cool semi-arid climate (BSk). Winters are freezing with a January average of −6.1 °C or 21.0 °F while summers are very warm to hot with a July average of 25.4 °C or 77.7 °F and average maximum of 32.2 °C or 90.0 °F. The average annual precipitation is 390 millimetres or 15.4 inches with winters being drier than summers. Record temperatures range from −34.0 °C (−29.2 °F) in January 1935 to 43.3 °C (109.9 °F) in July 2011.

Climate data for Elista (1991–2020, extremes 1927–present)
Month	Jan	Feb	Mar	Apr	May	Jun	Jul	Aug	Sep	Oct	Nov	Dec	Year
Record high °C (°F)	14.5 (58.1)	17.6 (63.7)	27.9 (82.2)	32.1 (89.8)	37.2 (99.0)	39.8 (103.6)	43.3 (109.9)	42.9 (109.2)	38.7 (101.7)	32.7 (90.9)	23.5 (74.3)	18.1 (64.6)	43.3 (109.9)
Mean daily maximum °C (°F)	−1.1 (30.0)	0.2 (32.4)	7.3 (45.1)	16.1 (61.0)	23.2 (73.8)	29.1 (84.4)	32.2 (90.0)	31.4 (88.5)	24.1 (75.4)	15.5 (59.9)	5.8 (42.4)	0.6 (33.1)	15.4 (59.7)
Daily mean °C (°F)	−3.9 (25.0)	−3.3 (26.1)	2.4 (36.3)	10.2 (50.4)	17.0 (62.6)	22.5 (72.5)	25.4 (77.7)	24.5 (76.1)	17.6 (63.7)	10.3 (50.5)	2.3 (36.1)	−2.3 (27.9)	10.2 (50.4)
Mean daily minimum °C (°F)	−6.3 (20.7)	−6.1 (21.0)	−1.2 (29.8)	5.3 (41.5)	11.5 (52.7)	16.5 (61.7)	19.1 (66.4)	18.1 (64.6)	12.1 (53.8)	6.2 (43.2)	0.4 (32.7)	−4.6 (23.7)	5.9 (42.7)
Record low °C (°F)	−34.0 (−29.2)	−32.0 (−25.6)	−27.2 (−17.0)	−11.2 (11.8)	−1.3 (29.7)	3.3 (37.9)	7.8 (46.0)	4.6 (40.3)	−3.2 (26.2)	−14.7 (5.5)	−27.7 (−17.9)	−30.2 (−22.4)	−34.0 (−29.2)
Average precipitation mm (inches)	25 (1.0)	22 (0.9)	32 (1.3)	31 (1.2)	48 (1.9)	41 (1.6)	37 (1.5)	24 (0.9)	34 (1.3)	35 (1.4)	30 (1.2)	31 (1.2)	390 (15.4)
Average precipitation days (≥ 1.0 mm)	7	5	7	5	7	6	4	3	5	5	6	7	67
Average relative humidity (%)	89	86	78	67	62	54	50	48	61	75	86	91	71
Mean monthly sunshine hours	71	88	131	201	277	300	326	299	237	167	71	42	2,210
Source 1: Pogoda.ru
Source 2: NOAA (sun, 1961–1990)

== Administrative and municipal status ==
Elista is the capital of the republic. Within the framework of administrative divisions, it is, together with four rural localities, incorporated as the City of Elista—an administrative unit with the status equal to that of the districts. As a municipal division, the City of Elista is incorporated as Elista Urban Okrug.

== Features ==
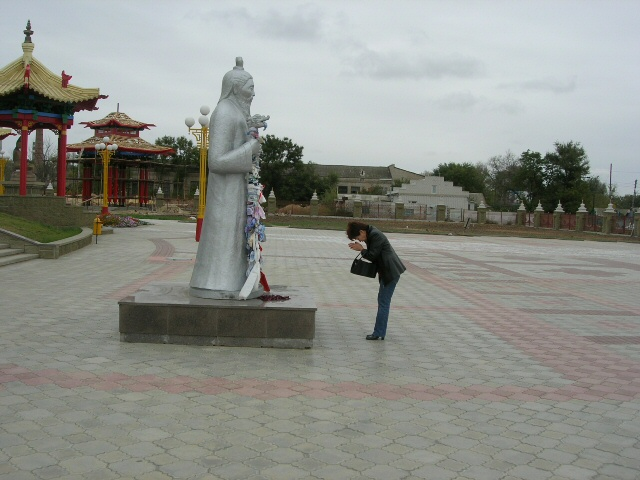
A Kalmyk woman praying in front of the statue before entering the temple

Since 1991, the town has been characterized by the slow decay of Soviet-built institutions, and the large construction projects instigated by the republic's millionaire president Kirsan Ilyumzhinov.

The town center has a number of renovated public parks focused on the main square, boasting statues to both Lenin and the Buddha. The main square features the Pagoda of Seven Days (Russian: Пагода Семи Дней), a Buddhist structure housing a large prayer wheel. To the east of the town lies the Olympic village of the 1998 XXXIII Chess Olympiad, known locally as "Chess City". The site has a public swimming pool and a museum of Kalmyk Buddhist art, which is also infrequently used as a conference center.

During his visit in 1998, the 14th Dalai Lama chose a location west of the town center to build the Burkhan Bakshin Altan Sume, a Buddhist temple for city residents. It was opened in December 2005. It is the largest Buddhist temple in Europe.

== Sport ==
Elista has been home to a top tier team for multiple years of the 1990 and 2000s, Uralan Elista. The team has been disbanded and restructured multiple times, always in the local, amateur leagues. The team played at Stadion Uralan, but this stadium was seemingly demolished in 2026.

Typhoon Elista were a motorcycle speedway team who regularly participated in the Soviet Union Championship from 15 April 1967 through to 1991. After the dissolution of the Soviet Union, the team disbanded. The team raced at the Elista Motordrome or Avtodrom located at (46°19′14″N 44°15′45″E).

Other sports facilities in Elista include: City-Chess, the Oyrat Arena, the Djungar Ice Centre and multiple other football and sports fields.

== Transportation ==
Elista has a small regional airport which is open daily during the week, providing flights to Moscow and various cities in the southern part of the Russian Federation. The airport was closed by the federal aviation authorities sometime in the fall of 2006, but was reopened sometime in 2007. Rail connections are available to Stavropol.

Due to the high cost of air travel, people usually prefer to take the bus between Elista and Moscow. The trip is approximately 18 hours and makes several rest stops along the route. Nowadays there is an airline, Azimuth, that provides air flights to Moscow, Saint Petersburg, Sochi, Crimea and Rostov on Don at affordable cost with direct flights from Elista airport. The price starts at 2500 rubles one way and it saves traveler a lot of time instead of traveling by bus as it was in the past.

Within Elista itself, a network of about a dozen marshrutka (minibus) routes is run by private companies. Minibuses are available around every five minutes. This is the preferred option of most Kalmykians because of the minimal cost (10 rubles).

== Demographics ==
Population:
103,749 (2010 census); 104,254 (2002 census); 89,695 (1989 Soviet census).

Ethnic composition (2021):

- Kalmyks – 76.9%
- Russians – 19.1%
- Kazakhs – 0.6%
- Others – 3.4%

== Twin towns – sister cities ==
Elista is twinned with:

- Aktau, Kazakhstan
- (Georgia (country)) Khoni, Georgia
- Kyzyl, Russia
- Lhasa, China
- Ulaanbaatar, Mongolia
- Ulan-Ude, Russia

== Gallery ==
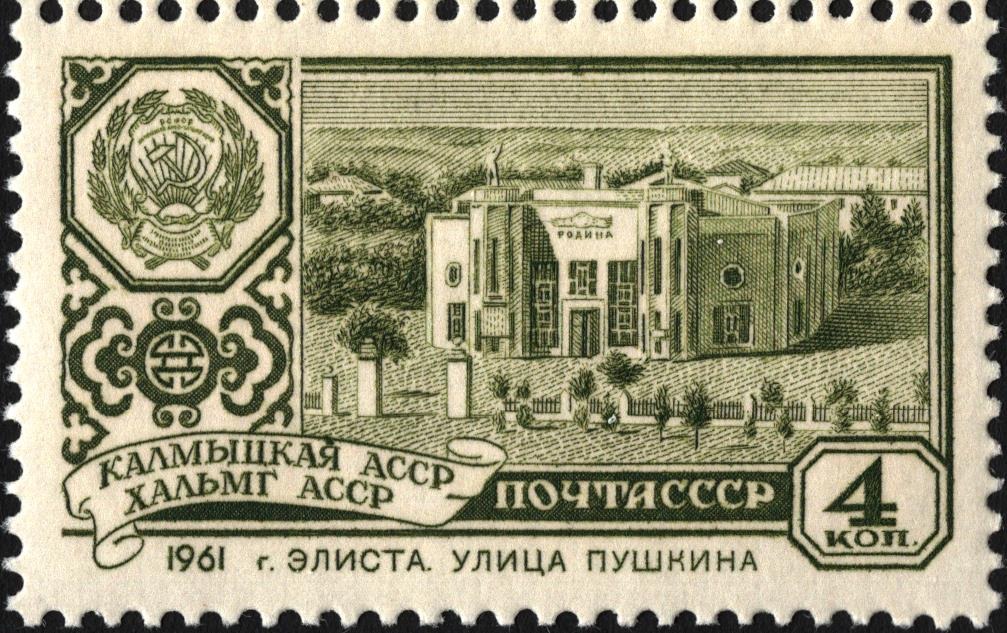
Elista's Pushkin Street on a 1961 stamp

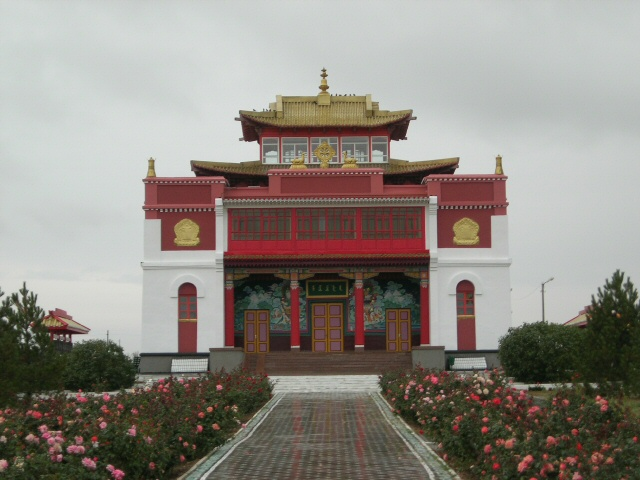
Geden Sheddup Choikorling Monastery

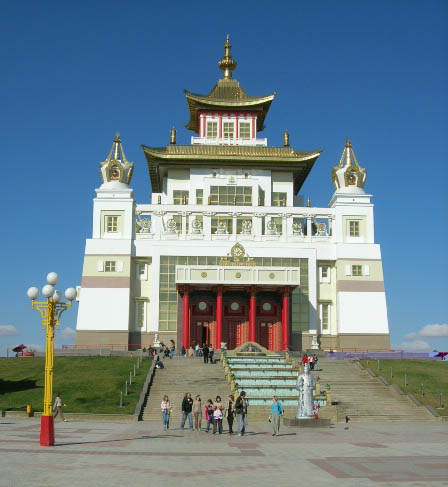
The Golden Temple

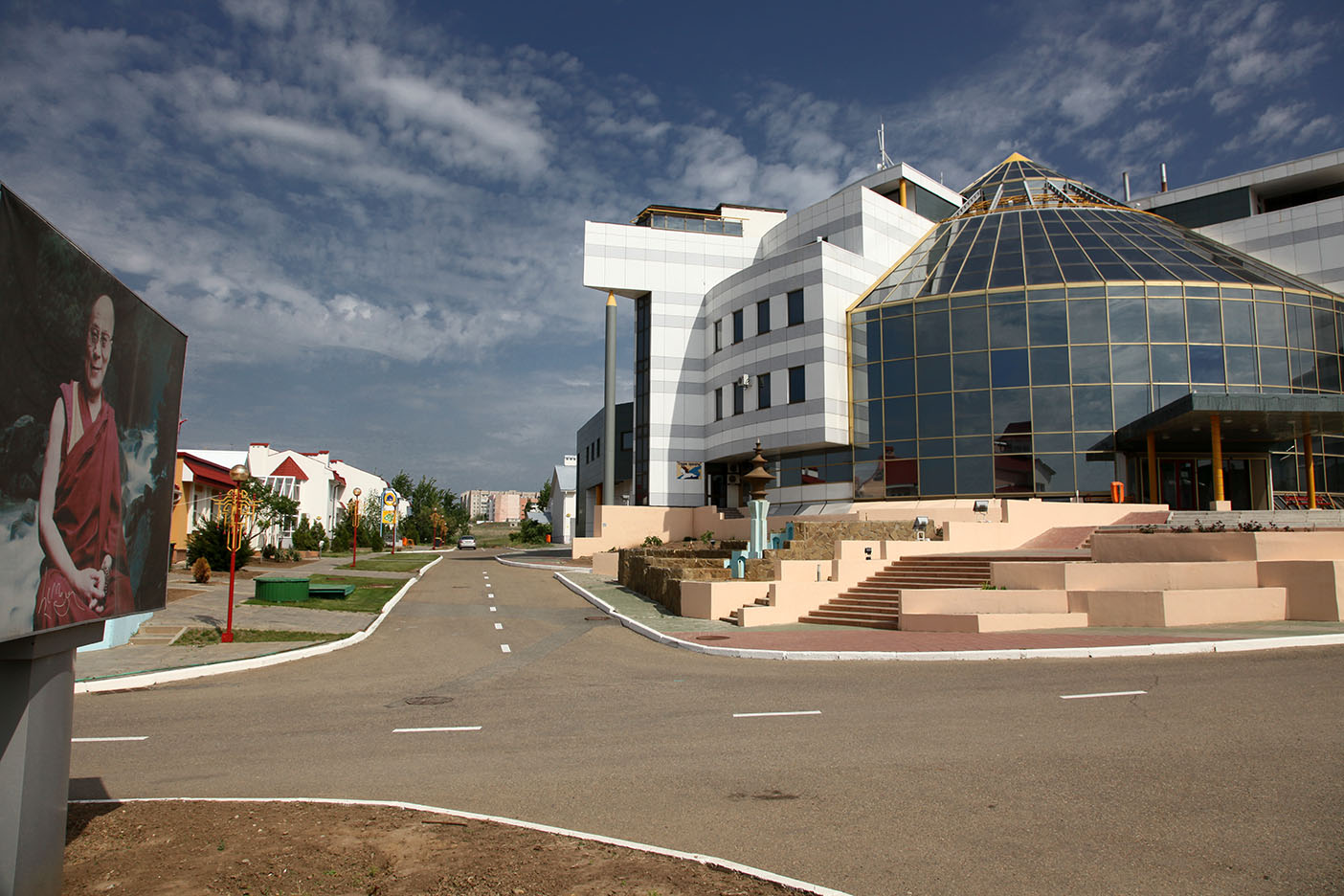
Elista's Chess City

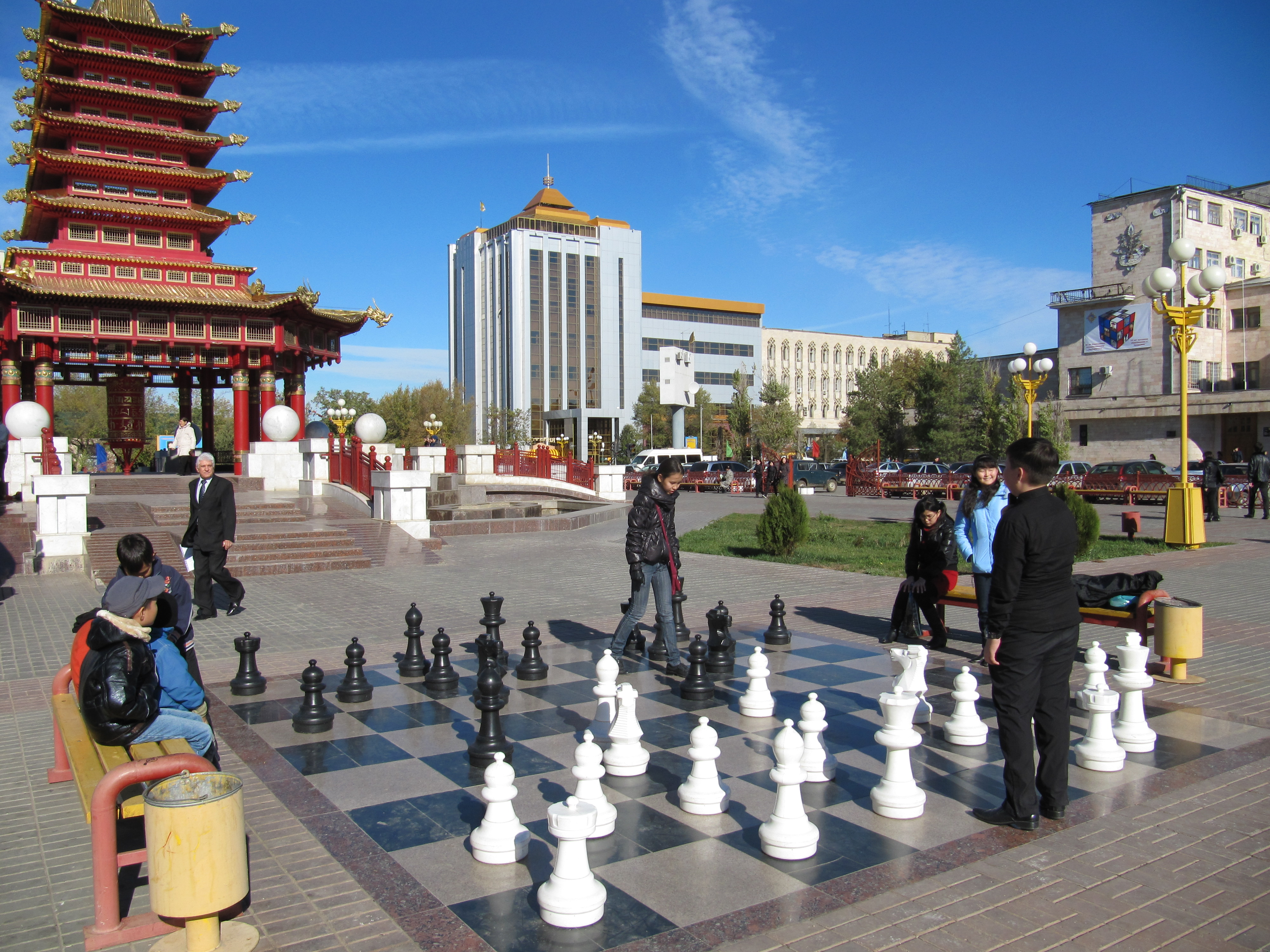
Playing chess near the Seven Days Pagoda, Elista

== See also ==
- Kalmyk State University
- Uralan Elista
