= Chess World Cup 2013 =

Chess tournament in Tromsø, Norway

FIDE Chess World Cup 2013
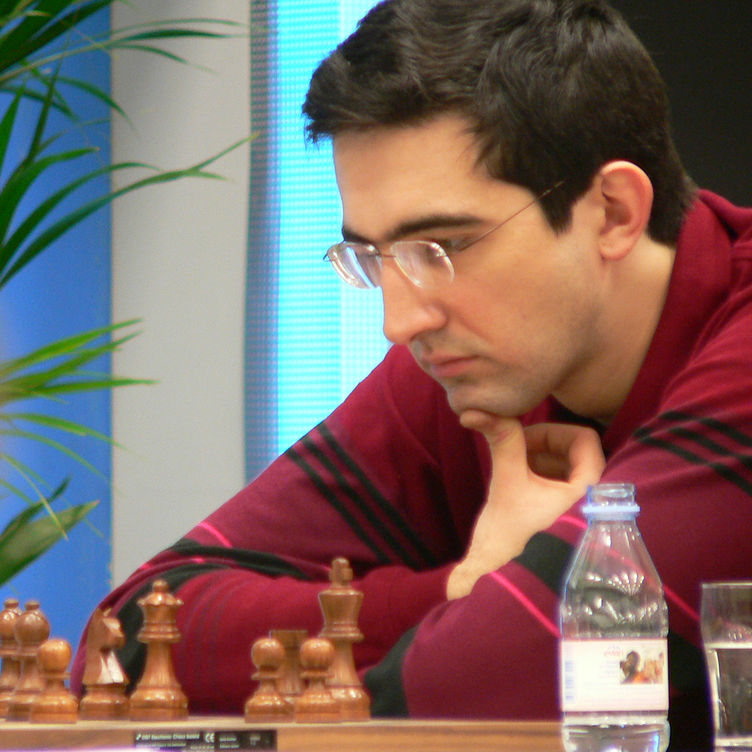
- 2013 FIDE World Cup winner Vladimir Kramnik.

Tournament information
- Sport: Chess
- Location: Tromsø, Norway
- Dates: 11 August 2013–2 September 2013
- Administrator: FIDE
- Tournament format: Single-elimination tournament
- Host: Chess Federation of Norway

Final positions
- Champion: (Russia) Vladimir Kramnik
- Runner-up: (Russia) Dmitry Andreikin

The Chess World Cup 2013 was a 128-player single-elimination chess tournament, played between 11 August and 2 September 2013, in the hotel Scandic Tromsø in Tromsø, Norway. It was won by Vladimir Kramnik, who defeated Dmitry Andreikin 2½–1½ in the final match. The finalists qualified for the 2014 Candidates Tournament.

The winner of the Chess World Cup 2011, Peter Svidler, was defeated by Dmitry Andreikin in the quarter-finals.

== Format ==
Matches consisted of two games (except for the final, which consisted of four). Players had 90 minutes for the first 40 moves followed by 30 minutes for the rest of the game with an addition of 30 seconds per move from the start of the game. If a match was tied after the regular games, tie breaks were played on the next day. The format for the tie breaks was as follows:

- Two rapid games (25 minutes plus 10 seconds increment) were to be played.
- If the score was tied after two rapid games, two rapid games (10 minutes plus 10 seconds increment) were to be played.
- If the score was tied after four rapid games, the opponents were to play two blitz games (five minutes plus three seconds increment).
- If the score was tied after a pair of blitz games, an armageddon game (in which a draw counts as a win for Black) was played. White would have five minutes and Black would have four minutes, and both players would have a three seconds per move increment beginning with move 61.

== Prize money ==
Round	Prize	Total
Round 1	64 × US $6,000	US $384,000
Round 2	32 × US $10,000	US $320,000
Round 3	16 × US $16,000	US $256,000
Round 4	8 × US $25,000	US $200,000
Round 5	4 × US $35,000	US $140,000
Round 6	2 × US $50,000	US $100,000
Runner-up	US $80,000	US $80,000
Winner	US $120,000	US $120,000
Total		US $1,600,000

== Participants ==
The participating players were seeded by their July 2013 FIDE ratings:

1. Levon Aronian (ARM), 2813 (R)
2. Fabiano Caruana (ITA), 2796 (R)
3. Vladimir Kramnik (RUS), 2784 (R)
4. Alexander Grischuk (RUS), 2780 (WC)
5. Sergey Karjakin (RUS), 2776 (R)
6. Hikaru Nakamura (USA), 2775 (R)
7. Boris Gelfand (ISR), 2773 (R)
8. Gata Kamsky (USA), 2763 (R)
9. Shakhriyar Mamedyarov (AZE), 2761 (R)
10. Leinier Domínguez (CUB), 2757 (R)
11. Ruslan Ponomariov (UKR), 2756 (WC)
12. Wang Hao (CHN), 2752 (R)
13. Peter Svidler (RUS), 2746 (WC)
14. Michael Adams (ENG), 2740 (R)
15. Peter Leko (HUN), 2737 (R)
16. Alexander Morozevich (RUS), 2736 (R)
17. Nikita Vitiugov (RUS), 2734 (E12)
18. Anish Giri (NED), 2734 (R)
19. Vassily Ivanchuk (UKR), 2733 (WC)
20. Teimour Radjabov (AZE), 2733 (R)
21. Dmitry Andreikin (RUS), 2727 (E12)
22. Anton Korobov (UKR), 2720 (E13)
23. Maxime Vachier-Lagrave (FRA), 2719 (PN)
24. Ian Nepomniachtchi (RUS), 2717 (R)
25. David Navara (CZE), 2715 (PN)
26. Étienne Bacrot (FRA), 2714 (E12)
27. Evgeny Alekseev (RUS), 2714 (E13)
28. Dmitry Jakovenko (RUS), 2713 (E12)
29. Lê Quang Liêm (VIE), 2712 (AS13)
30. Alexander Areshchenko (UKR), 2709 (E13)
31. Vladimir Malakhov (RUS), 2709 (E12)
32. Evgeny Tomashevsky (RUS), 2709 (R)
33. Wesley So (PHI), 2708 (Z3.3)
34. Laurent Fressinet (FRA), 2708 (E12)
35. Alexander Riazantsev (RUS), 2708 (E12)
36. Francisco Vallejo Pons (ESP), 2706 (E12)
37. Pavel Eljanov (UKR), 2702 (E13)
38. Radosław Wojtaszek (POL), 2701 (R)
39. Alexander Moiseenko (UKR), 2699 (E13)
40. Sergei Movsesian (ARM), 2699 (E13)
41. Alexei Shirov (LAT), 2696 (R)
42. Judit Polgár (HUN), 2696 (PN)
43. Baadur Jobava (GEO), 2693 (E12)
44. Vladimir Akopian (ARM), 2691 (E12)
45. Lázaro Bruzón (CUB), 2689 (Z2.3)
46. Andrei Volokitin (UKR), 2688 (E12)
47. Li Chao (CHN), 2686 (AS13)
48. Markus Ragger (AUT), 2680 (E13)
49. Ernesto Inarkiev (RUS), 2680 (E12)
50. Julio Granda (PER), 2679 (AM12)
51. Yuriy Kryvoruchko (UKR), 2678 (E12)
52. Victor Bologan (MDA), 2672 (E12)
53. Alexey Dreev (RUS), 2668 (E12)
54. Sergey Fedorchuk (UKR), 2667 (E13)
55. Alexander Onischuk (USA), 2667 (Z2.1)
56. Maxim Matlakov (RUS), 2665 (E12)
57. Aleksandr Shimanov (RUS), 2664 (E13)
58. Evgeny Romanov (RUS), 2662 (E13)
59. Eltaj Safarli (AZE), 2660 (E13)
60. Krishnan Sasikiran (IND), 2660 (AS13)
61. Vadim Zvjaginsev (RUS), 2659 (E13)
62. Denis Khismatullin (RUS), 2658 (E12)
63. Yu Yangyi (CHN), 2657 (AS12)
64. Igor Lysyj (RUS), 2656 (E13)
65. Andrei Istrățescu (FRA), 2651 (E13)
66. Alexander Beliavsky (SLO), 2651 (E13)
67. Mikhail Kobalia (RUS), 2651 (E12)
68. Dariusz Świercz (POL), 2650 (J11)
69. Constantin Lupulescu (ROU), 2650 (E13)
70. Bassem Amin (EGY), 2650 (AF)
71. Anton Filippov (UZB), 2643 (Z3.4)
72. Gawain Jones (ENG), 2643 (E12)
73. Jan Smeets (NED), 2643 (E12)
74. Eduardo Iturrizaga (VEN), 2642 (Z2.3)
75. Daniil Dubov (RUS), 2638 (E13)
76. Sergei Azarov (BLR), 2636 (E12)
77. Zbyněk Hráček (CZE), 2635 (E13)
78. Parimarjan Negi (IND), 2634 (AS12)
79. Hrant Melkumyan (ARM), 2632 (E13)
80. Rafael Leitão (BRA), 2632 (Z2.4)
81. Ivan Popov (RUS), 2632 (E13)
82. Evgeny Postny (ISR), 2631 (E13)
83. Ray Robson (USA), 2628 (Z2.1)
84. Evgeniy Najer (RUS), 2628 (E12)
85. Nguyễn Ngọc Trường Sơn (VIE), 2625 (Z3.3)
86. Martyn Kravtsiv (UKR), 2620 (E13)
87. Isan Reynaldo Ortiz Suárez (CUB), 2612 (AM13)
88. Hou Yifan (CHN), 2600 (PN)
89. Jon Ludvig Hammer (NOR), 2599 (ON)
90. Ahmed Adly (EGY), 2596 (AF)
91. Alexandr Fier (BRA), 2595 (Z2.4)
92. Sabino Brunello (ITA), 2593 (E13)
93. Diego Flores (ARG), 2592 (AM13)
94. Rubén Felgaer (ARG), 2586 (Z2.5)
95. Larry Christiansen (USA), 2584 (Z2.1)
96. Alexander Ipatov (TUR), 2583 (J12)
97. Alejandro Ramírez (USA), 2583 (Z2.1)
98. Eric Hansen (CAN), 2581 (AM12)
99. Gregory Kaidanov (USA), 2577 (AM12)
100. Oliver Barbosa (PHI), 2572 (AS12)
101. Mark Paragua (PHI), 2569 (AS13)
102. Adhiban Baskaran (IND), 2567 (AS13)
103. Simen Agdestein (NOR), 2567 (ON)
104. Sandro Mareco (ARG), 2562 (Z2.5)
105. Wei Yi (CHN), 2557 (PN)
106. Alexander Shabalov (USA), 2553 (AM12)
107. Vasif Durarbayli (AZE), 2549 (E12)
108. Pouria Darini (IRI), 2548 (Z3.1)
109. Jorge Cori (PER), 2543 (AM13)
110. Jan-Krzysztof Duda (POL), 2536, IM (PN)
111. Salem Saleh (UAE), 2531 (AS12)
112. Conrad Holt (USA), 2530 (Z2.1)
113. Bator Sambuev (CAN), 2530 (Z2.2)
114. Leif Erlend Johannessen (NOR), 2520 (ON)
115. Wan Yunguo (CHN), 2509, IM (Z3.5)
116. Anna Ushenina (UKR), 2500 (WWC)
117. Liu Qingnan (CHN), 2500, IM (AS12)
118. Torbjørn Ringdal Hansen (NOR), 2492, IM (ON)
119. Essam El-Gindy (EGY), 2490 (AF)
120. Samy Shoker (EGY), 2487, IM (Z4.2)
121. Lou Yiping (CHN), 2483, IM (Z3.5)
122. Ziaur Rahman (BAN), 2470 (Z3.2)
123. Deysi Cori (PER), 2434, WGM (AM13)
124. Ali Sebbar (MAR), 2371, untitled (Z4.1)
125. Igor Bjelobrk (AUS), 2341, FM (Z3.6)
126. Gillan Bwalya (ZAM), 2341, FM (Z4.3)
127. G. Akash (IND), 2332, IM (Z3.7)
128. Mikhail Markov (KGZ), 2305, untitled (Z3.4)

All players are grandmasters unless indicated otherwise.

=== Qualification paths ===
- WC: Semi-finalists of the Chess World Cup 2011
- WWC: Women's World Champion
- J11 and J12: World Junior Champions 2011 and 2012
- R: Rating (average of all published ratings from March 2012 to January 2013 is used)
- E12 and E13: European Individual Championships 2012 and 2013
- AM12 and AM13: American Continental Championship 2012 and 2013
- AS12 and AS13: Asian Chess Championship 2012 and 2013
- AF: African Chess Championship 2013
- Z2.1, Z2.2, Z2.3, Z2.4, Z2.5, Z3.1, Z3.2, Z3.3, Z3.4, Z3.5, Z3.6, Z3.7, Z4.1, Z4.2, Z4.3: Zonal tournaments
- PN: FIDE president nominee
- ON: Organizer nominee

=== Prominent non-participants ===
Magnus Carlsen, Viswanathan Anand, and Veselin Topalov qualified for the event, but they declined to participate. The only other player from the world's top 30 who did not participate is Ding Liren. Levon Aronian (who declined to play in 2009 and 2011) and Vladimir Kramnik (who had never played in a Chess World Cup) chose to participate because FIDE made participation in either the Chess World Cup or the FIDE Grand Prix series mandatory for qualification to the 2014 Candidates Tournament through rating.

=== Post-tournament opinions ===
In particular, Alexander Grischuk was decidedly negative about the organization, as was noted coach Vladimir Chuchelov.

== Calendar ==
Round	Regular games	Tiebreaks
Round 1	11–12 August	13 August
Round 2	14–15 August	16 August
Round 3	17–18 August	19 August
Round 4	20–21 August	22 August
Quarterfinals	23–24 August	25 August
Semifinals	26–27 August	28 August
Final	30 August – 2 September	3 September

== Results, rounds 1–4 ==
=== Section 1 ===
First round
1	(Armenia) Levon Aronian	2
128	(Kyrgyzstan) Mikhail Markov	0
64	(Russia) Igor Lysyj	1½
65	(France) Andrei Istrățescu	½
32	(Russia) Evgeny Tomashevsky	5
97	(United States) Alejandro Ramírez	4
33	(Philippines) Wesley So	1½
96	(Turkey) Alexander Ipatov	½
16	(Russia) Alexander Morozevich	2½
113	(Canada) Bator Sambuev	1½
49	(Russia) Ernesto Inarkiev	2½
80	(Brazil) Rafael Leitão	3½
17	(Russia) Nikita Vitiugov	2
112	(United States) Conrad Holt	0
48	(Austria) Markus Ragger	2½
81	(Russia) Ivan Popov	1½

Quarter-finals
1	(Armenia) Levon Aronian	3
64	(Russia) Igor Lysyj	1
32	(Russia) Evgeny Tomashevsky	1½
33	(Philippines) Wesley So	½
16	(Russia) Alexander Morozevich	1½
80	(Brazil) Rafael Leitão	½
17	(Russia) Nikita Vitiugov	1½
48	(Austria) Markus Ragger	½

Third round
1	(Armenia) Levon Aronian	½
32	(Russia) Evgeny Tomashevsky	1½
16	(Russia) Alexander Morozevich	4½
17	(Russia) Nikita Vitiugov	3½

Fourth round
32	(Russia) Evgeny Tomashevsky	4½
16	(Russia) Alexander Morozevich	3½

=== Section 2 ===
First round
8	(United States) Gata Kamsky	3½
121	(China) Lou Yiping	2½
57	(Russia) Aleksandr Shimanov	3½
72	(England) Gawain Jones	2½
25	(Czech Republic) David Navara	1½
104	(Argentina) Sandro Mareco	½
40	(Armenia) Sergei Movsesian	1½
89	(Norway) Jon Ludvig Hammer	2½
9	(Azerbaijan) Shakhriyar Mamedyarov	1½
120	(Egypt) Samy Shoker	½
56	(Russia) Maxim Matlakov	1½
73	(Netherlands) Jan Smeets	½
24	(Russia) Ian Nepomniachtchi	½
105	(China) Wei Yi	1½
41	(Latvia) Alexei Shirov	4
88	(China) Hou Yifan	2

Quarter-finals
8	(United States) Gata Kamsky	3
57	(Russia) Aleksandr Shimanov	1
25	(Czech Republic) David Navara	1
89	(Norway) Jon Ludvig Hammer	3
9	(Azerbaijan) Shakhriyar Mamedyarov	2½
56	(Russia) Maxim Matlakov	1½
105	(China) Wei Yi	1½
41	(Latvia) Alexei Shirov	½

Third round
8	(United States) Gata Kamsky	1½
89	(Norway) Jon Ludvig Hammer	½
9	(Azerbaijan) Shakhriyar Mamedyarov	2½
105	(China) Wei Yi	1½

Fourth round
8	(United States) Gata Kamsky	1½
9	(Azerbaijan) Shakhriyar Mamedyarov	½

=== Section 3 ===
First round
4	(Russia) Alexander Grischuk	2
125	(Australia) Igor Bjelobrk	0
61	(Russia) Vadim Zvjaginsev	3½
68	(Poland) Dariusz Świercz	4½
29	(Vietnam) Lê Quang Liêm	2
100	(Philippines) Oliver Barbosa	0
36	(Spain) Francisco Vallejo Pons	2
93	(Argentina) Diego Flores	0
13	(Russia) Peter Svidler	3
116	(Ukraine) Anna Ushenina	1
52	(Moldova) Victor Bologan	3½
77	(Czech Republic) Zbyněk Hráček	2½
20	(Azerbaijan) Teimour Radjabov	3½
109	(Peru) Jorge Cori	2½
45	(Cuba) Lázaro Bruzón	3
84	(Russia) Evgeniy Najer	1

Quarter-finals
4	(Russia) Alexander Grischuk	1½
68	(Poland) Dariusz Świercz	½
29	(Vietnam) Lê Quang Liêm	2½
36	(Spain) Francisco Vallejo Pons	1½
13	(Russia) Peter Svidler	2½
52	(Moldova) Victor Bologan	1½
20	(Azerbaijan) Teimour Radjabov	4
45	(Cuba) Lázaro Bruzón	2

Third round
4	(Russia) Alexander Grischuk	1½
29	(Vietnam) Lê Quang Liêm	2½
13	(Russia) Peter Svidler	1½
20	(Azerbaijan) Teimour Radjabov	½

Fourth round
29	(Vietnam) Lê Quang Liêm	1½
13	(Russia) Peter Svidler	2½

=== Section 4 ===
First round
5	(Russia) Sergey Karjakin	1½
124	(Morocco) Ali Sebbar	½
60	(India) Krishnan Sasikiran	2½
69	(Romania) Constantin Lupulescu	1½
28	(Russia) Dmitry Jakovenko	2
101	(Philippines) Mark Paragua	0
37	(Ukraine) Pavel Eljanov	1½
92	(Italy) Sabino Brunello	½
12	(China) Wang Hao	1½
117	(China) Liu Qingnan	½
53	(Russia) Alexey Dreev	2½
76	(Belarus) Sergei Azarov	1½
21	(Russia) Dmitry Andreikin	2½
108	(Iran) Pouria Darini	1½
44	(Armenia) Vladimir Akopian	½
85	(Vietnam) Nguyễn Ngọc Trường Sơn	1½

Quarter-finals
5	(Russia) Sergey Karjakin	2½
60	(India) Krishnan Sasikiran	1½
28	(Russia) Dmitry Jakovenko	½
37	(Ukraine) Pavel Eljanov	1½
12	(China) Wang Hao	1
53	(Russia) Alexey Dreev	3
21	(Russia) Dmitry Andreikin	1½
85	(Vietnam) Nguyễn Ngọc Trường Sơn	½

Third round
5	(Russia) Sergey Karjakin	4½
37	(Ukraine) Pavel Eljanov	3½
53	(Russia) Alexey Dreev	2
21	(Russia) Dmitry Andreikin	4

Fourth round
5	(Russia) Sergey Karjakin	1
21	(Russia) Dmitry Andreikin	3

=== Section 5 ===
First round
2	(Italy) Fabiano Caruana	1½
127	(India) G. Akash	½
63	(China) Yu Yangyi	3
66	(Slovenia) Alexander Beliavsky	1
31	(Russia) Vladimir Malakhov	1½
98	(Canada) Eric Hansen	½
34	(France) Laurent Fressinet	1½
95	(United States) Larry Christiansen	½
15	(Hungary) Peter Leko	1½
114	(Norway) Leif Erlend Johannessen	½
50	(Peru) Julio Granda	5
79	(Armenia) Hrant Melkumyan	4
18	(Netherlands) Anish Giri	1½
111	(United Arab Emirates) Salem Saleh	½
47	(China) Li Chao	2½
82	(Israel) Evgeny Postny	1½

Quarter-finals
2	(Italy) Fabiano Caruana	1½
63	(China) Yu Yangyi	½
31	(Russia) Vladimir Malakhov	3
34	(France) Laurent Fressinet	1
15	(Hungary) Peter Leko	½
50	(Peru) Julio Granda	1½
18	(Netherlands) Anish Giri	2
47	(China) Li Chao	0

Third round
2	(Italy) Fabiano Caruana	3
31	(Russia) Vladimir Malakhov	1
50	(Peru) Julio Granda	2½
18	(Netherlands) Anish Giri	1½

Fourth round
2	(Italy) Fabiano Caruana	2
50	(Peru) Julio Granda	0

=== Section 6 ===
First round
7	(Israel) Boris Gelfand	1½
122	(Bangladesh) Ziaur Rahman	½
58	(Russia) Evgeny Romanov	½
71	(Uzbekistan) Anton Filippov	1½
26	(France) Étienne Bacrot	2
103	(Norway) Simen Agdestein	0
39	(Ukraine) Alexander Moiseenko	w/o
90	(Egypt) Ahmed Adly	w/d
10	(Cuba) Leinier Domínguez	2
119	(Egypt) Essam El-Gindy	0
55	(United States) Alexander Onischuk	1½
74	(Venezuela) Eduardo Iturrizaga	½
23	(France) Maxime Vachier-Lagrave	2
106	(United States) Alexander Shabalov	0
42	(Hungary) Judit Polgár	½
87	(Cuba) Isan Reynaldo Ortiz Suárez	1½

Quarter-finals
7	(Israel) Boris Gelfand	1½
71	(Uzbekistan) Anton Filippov	½
26	(France) Étienne Bacrot	1½
39	(Ukraine) Alexander Moiseenko	2½
10	(Cuba) Leinier Domínguez	1½
55	(United States) Alexander Onischuk	½
23	(France) Maxime Vachier-Lagrave	2
87	(Cuba) Isan Reynaldo Ortiz Suárez	0

Third round
7	(Israel) Boris Gelfand	1½
39	(Ukraine) Alexander Moiseenko	½
10	(Cuba) Leinier Domínguez	½
23	(France) Maxime Vachier-Lagrave	1½

Fourth round
7	(Israel) Boris Gelfand	1½
23	(France) Maxime Vachier-Lagrave	2½

=== Section 7 ===
First round
3	(Russia) Vladimir Kramnik	2
126	(Zambia) Gillan Bwalya	0
62	(Russia) Denis Khismatullin	1½
67	(Russia) Mikhail Kobalia	2½
30	(Ukraine) Alexander Areshchenko	1½
99	(United States) Gregory Kaidanov	½
35	(Russia) Alexander Riazantsev	2½
94	(Argentina) Rubén Felgaer	3½
14	(England) Michael Adams	2½
115	(China) Wan Yunguo	1½
51	(Ukraine) Yuriy Kryvoruchko	4
78	(India) Parimarjan Negi	2
19	(Ukraine) Vassily Ivanchuk	1½
110	(Poland) Jan-Krzysztof Duda	½
46	(Ukraine) Andrei Volokitin	0
83	(United States) Ray Robson	2

Quarter-finals
3	(Russia) Vladimir Kramnik	2½
67	(Russia) Mikhail Kobalia	1½
30	(Ukraine) Alexander Areshchenko	1½
94	(Argentina) Rubén Felgaer	½
14	(England) Michael Adams	1½
51	(Ukraine) Yuriy Kryvoruchko	2½
19	(Ukraine) Vassily Ivanchuk	2
83	(United States) Ray Robson	0

Third round
3	(Russia) Vladimir Kramnik	3
30	(Ukraine) Alexander Areshchenko	1
51	(Ukraine) Yuriy Kryvoruchko	1
19	(Ukraine) Vassily Ivanchuk	3

Fourth round
3	(Russia) Vladimir Kramnik	1½
19	(Ukraine) Vassily Ivanchuk	½

=== Section 8 ===
First round
6	(United States) Hikaru Nakamura	2
123	(Peru) Deysi Cori	0
59	(Azerbaijan) Eltaj Safarli	3½
70	(Egypt) Bassem Amin	2½
27	(Russia) Evgeny Alekseev	3
102	(India) Adhiban Baskaran	5
38	(Poland) Radosław Wojtaszek	1½
91	(Brazil) Alexandr Fier	2½
11	(Ukraine) Ruslan Ponomariov	1½
118	(Norway) Torbjørn Ringdal Hansen	½
54	(Ukraine) Sergey Fedorchuk	0
75	(Russia) Daniil Dubov	2
22	(Ukraine) Anton Korobov	3
107	(Azerbaijan) Vasif Durarbayli	1
43	(Georgia (country)) Baadur Jobava	3
86	(Ukraine) Martyn Kravtsiv	1

Quarter-finals
6	(United States) Hikaru Nakamura	1½
59	(Azerbaijan) Eltaj Safarli	½
102	(India) Adhiban Baskaran	1½
91	(Brazil) Alexandr Fier	½
11	(Ukraine) Ruslan Ponomariov	4
75	(Russia) Daniil Dubov	5
22	(Ukraine) Anton Korobov	3
43	(Georgia (country)) Baadur Jobava	1

Third round
6	(United States) Hikaru Nakamura	2
102	(India) Adhiban Baskaran	0
75	(Russia) Daniil Dubov	1½
22	(Ukraine) Anton Korobov	2½

Fourth round
6	(United States) Hikaru Nakamura	½
22	(Ukraine) Anton Korobov	1½

== Results, rounds 5–7 ==
Quarterfinals
32	(Russia) Evgeny Tomashevsky	1½
8	(United States) Gata Kamsky	½
13	(Russia) Peter Svidler	1½
21	(Russia) Dmitry Andreikin	2½
2	(Italy) Fabiano Caruana	1½
23	(France) Maxime Vachier-Lagrave	2½
3	(Russia) Vladimir Kramnik	1½
22	(Ukraine) Anton Korobov	½

Semifinals
32	(Russia) Evgeny Tomashevsky	1½
21	(Russia) Dmitry Andreikin	2½
23	(France) Maxime Vachier-Lagrave	1½
3	(Russia) Vladimir Kramnik	2½

Final
21	(Russia) Dmitry Andreikin	1½
3	(Russia) Vladimir Kramnik	2½

=== Final, 30 August – 2 September ===
Seed	Name	July rating	1	2	3	4	Total
21	Dmitry Andreikin (RUS)	2727	0	½	½	½	1½
3	Vladimir Kramnik (RUS)	2784	1	½	½	½	2½
