= Nikita Vitiugov =

Russian-English chess grandmaster (born 1987)

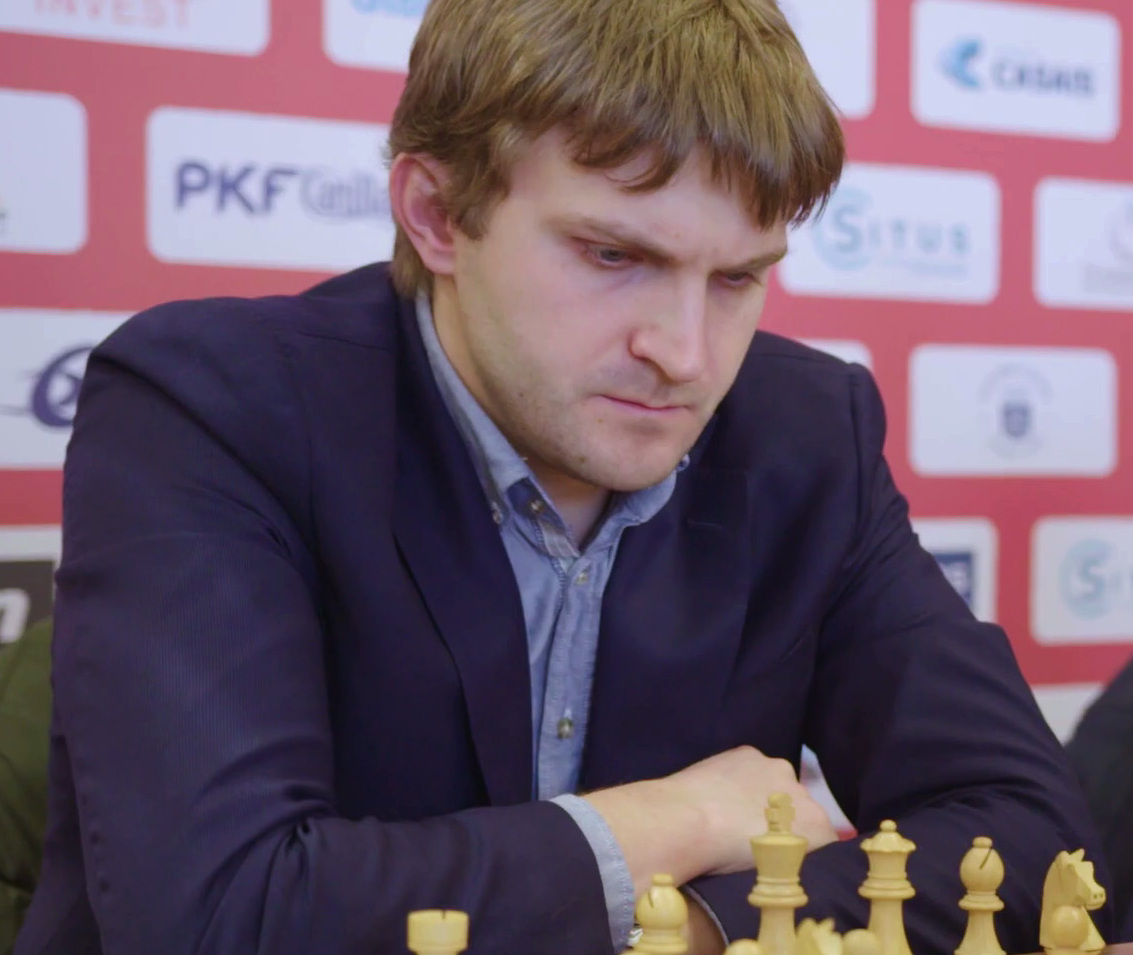
- Vitiugov in 2019

Personal information
- Born: Nikita Kirillovich Vitiugov; 4 February 1987 (age 39) Leningrad, Russian SFSR, Soviet Union

Chess career
- Country: Russia (until 2022); FIDE (2022–2023); England (since 2023) (Note: Several Russian players officially switched federations in response to the 2022 Russian invasion of Ukraine.)
- Title: Grandmaster (2007)
- FIDE rating: 2666 (July 2026)
- Peak rating: 2751 (November 2019)
- Ranking: No. 49 (July 2026)
- Peak ranking: No. 15 (May 2011)

Nikita Kirillovich Vitiugov (Russian: Никита Кириллович Витюгов; born 4 February 1987) is a Russian chess grandmaster who has represented England since 2023. He changed federations in response to the Russian invasion of Ukraine. He was a member of the victorious Russian team at the World Team Chess Championship in 2009 and 2013. Vitiugov won the Gibraltar Masters tournament in 2013 and the Grenke Open in 2017. He was also the winner of the 2021 Russian Chess Championship.

== Career ==
Vitiugov was the under 18 Russian champion in 2005 and the runner-up at the European under 18 championship in the same year. He came second at the Russian Junior Championship both in 2006 and 2007. He finished runner-up in the 2006 World Junior Chess Championship.

In July 2006, he won the "Blue Sevan" round-robin tournament in Sevan, Armenia to achieve his last norm required for the title of Grandmaster. In December of that year, he took part in the Russian Championship Superfinal for the first time, finishing eleventh.

He qualified through the 2007 European Individual Chess Championship for the FIDE World Cup 2007, in which he was knocked out by Konstantin Sakaev in the first round. In September of that year he won the Russian Championship Higher League and qualified for the Superfinal. Here he tied for 4th–6th places.

In 2008 he won the Baltic Sea Cup in Bornholm, Denmark edging out on tiebreak score Boris Savchenko, and the Cup of Russia, defeating Savchenko in the final.

In November 2009, he took part in the FIDE World Cup, where he sequentially knocked out Abhijeet Gupta, Gilberto Milos and Konstantin Sakaev, then lost to Sergey Karjakin in the fourth round. The following month, Vitiugov finished third in the 62nd Russian Championship Superfinal. Thanks to his results in the 2009 Superfinal and in the 2009 World Team Championship, he crossed the 2700 Elo rating mark for the first time in the FIDE rating list of March 2010.

In April 2010, he took part in the 11th Anatoly Karpov Tournament in Poikovsky, finishing joint third, fourth on tiebreak. In March 2011, he tied for 1st–3rd with Evgeny Tomashevsky and Lê Quang Liêm in the Aeroflot Open, placing second on tiebreak. Later that year, Vitiugov competed in the World Cup, where he knocked out Alexei Bezgodov in the first round and Anton Korobov in the second, before losing to Vladimir Potkin in the third round. At the end of December 2011, Vitiugov took part in the 54th Reggio Emilia tournament, scoring two wins, two draws and six losses. In June 2012, Vitiugov tied for first place with Dmitry Andreikin and Daniil Dubov in the Russian Championship Higher League, finishing in third place on tiebreak.

In January 2013, Vitiugov won the Masters tournament of the Tradewise Gibraltar Chess Festival beating defending champion Nigel Short in a rapid playoff. He and three others finished the tournament with a score of 8/10 points. In the 2013 Alekhine Memorial, held from 20 April to 1 May, Vitiugov finished fifth, with a score of 4½ points from 9 games (one win, one loss, seven draws). At the World Cup 2013 he defeated Conrad Holt and Markus Ragger in rounds one and two respectively, then was eliminated in the third by Alexander Morozevich. In October of the same year, he finished third in the Russian Championship Superfinal.

Vitiugov acted as a second for Peter Svidler in the Candidates Tournaments of 2013 and 2014. In January 2014, at the Gibraltar Masters he tied for first place with Vassily Ivanchuk and Ivan Cheparinov. In the playoffs, after winning against the former, he lost to the latter and eventually finished second. In the 2015 edition he tied for third place, placing fourth on tiebreak. In August 2015 he placed third in the Russian Championship Superfinal. In the following month, he competed in the FIDE World Cup, where he was knocked out in the second round by Le Quang Liem, after defeating Samvel Ter-Sahakyan in the first. In 2016 Vitiugov tied for first in the Grenke Chess Open in Karlsruhe, Germany with Matthias Blübaum, Vladimir Fedoseev, Miloš Perunović, Ni Hua, and Francisco Vallejo Pons, taking third place on tiebreak. Vitiugov won this tournament the following year on tiebreak from Maxim Matlakov, Étienne Bacrot and Zdenko Kožul. In December 2017, he tied for first with Peter Svidler in the Russian Superfinal scoring 7/11 points. Vitiugov lost the playoff.

In 2018, Vitiugov participated in the 5th Grenke Chess Classic. He finished fourth with a score of 5/9 points (+2–1=6). With the same score he won the Masters tournament of the Prague Chess Festival the following year.

Through February and March 2022, Vitiugov played in the FIDE Grand Prix 2022. In the second leg, he tied for second with Amin Tabatabaei in Pool B with a 3/6 result. In the third leg, he tied for second with Yu Yangyi in Pool D with a result of 3/6, finishing 13th in the standings with six points.

=== Team competitions ===
Vitiugov made his debut in the Russian national team in August 2009 playing in the 6th China-Russia Match, held with the Scheveningen system. He played board 6 for the Russian team that win the gold medal at the World Team Chess Championship 2009 in Bursa scoring 5.5/6. His rating performance of 2939, the second best of the event, earned him also an individual gold medal. Vitiugov played on the third board for Russia's second team at the 39th Chess Olympiad scoring 6/9. In July 2011 he took part in the 8th World Team Championship in Ningbo scoring 4/6 on board 5; thanks to this result, he won an individual gold medal. In the World Team Championship 2013 in Antalya, Vitiugov won the team gold medal and an individual bronze playing on the reserve board. In the 2017 edition of the event, he won the team silver medal in Khanty-Mansiysk. The next year, Vitiugov played for Russia in the 43rd Chess Olympiad and took the team bronze medal.

Vitiugov plays for Saint Petersburg Chess Federation in the Russian Team Championship and in the European Chess Club Cup. He helped his team to win gold at the European Club Cup 2011, scoring 5.5/7 with a rating performance of 2835; thanks to this result he also won individual gold on second board. In November 2012 he helped his team to win silver at the 28th European Club Cup and also won individual bronze on board 3. In the Russian Team Championship 2013 he won team gold and individual bronze on the second board. In the 29th European Club Cup he took silver on the third board. His team, renamed to Mednyi Vsadnik ("Bronze Horseman") in 2015, won the gold medal again in the European Club Cup in 2018. Vitiugov also won an individual gold.

== Books ==
- Nikita Vitiugov (2010). The French Defence: a Complete Black Repertoire. Chess Stars. ISBN 978-954-8782-76-0.
- Nikita Vitiugov (2012). The French Defence Reloaded. Chess Stars. ISBN 978-954-8782-86-9.
