= Qingnan =

Qingnan may refer to:

- Qingnan, the southern area of Qinghai Province, China
- Qingnan Village, village in Gantian, Zhuzhou, Hunan, China
- Liu Qingnan, Chinese grandmaster of chess
