= Anton Korobov =

Ukrainian chess grandmaster (born 1985)

- Korobov at the 2026 Chess Olympiad

Personal information
- Born: 25 June 1985 (age 41) Mezhdurechensk, Russian SFSR, Soviet Union

Chess career
- Country: Ukraine
- Title: Grandmaster (2003)
- FIDE rating: 2621 (November 2026)
- Peak rating: 2723 (January 2014)
- Peak ranking: No. 25 (July 2013)

Anton Sergiyovych Korobov (Ukrainian: Антон Сергійович Коробов; born 25 June 1985) is a Ukrainian chess grandmaster. Korobov is a four-time Ukrainian champion. He was voted the best male chess player of Ukraine of 2012.

== Chess career ==
Korobov won the Ukrainian Chess Championship in 2002, 2012, 2018, 2020 and finished second behind Andrei Volokitin in 2004.

He won the Masters tournament of the Abu Dhabi Chess Festival in 2010. In 2011, he came first in the Nakhchivan Open. He competed in the Chess World Cup 2011, where was eliminated in the second round by Nikita Vitiugov. In February 2012, he tied for 1st–3rd with Mateusz Bartel and Pavel Eljanov in the 11th Aeroflot Open. Korobov took clear third place in the Ukrainian Championship of 2013, behind Yuriy Kryvoruchko and Ruslan Ponomariov respectively.

In the World Cup 2013 in Tromsø, Norway he eliminated Vasif Durarbayli, Baadur Jobava, Daniil Dubov and Hikaru Nakamura, but in the fifth round he was knocked out by former World Chess Champion Vladimir Kramnik, after losing the first game and drawing the second.

He served as Anna Ushenina's second during the Women's World Chess Championship 2012 and during her match with Hou Yifan in the Women's World Chess Championship 2013, alongside Alexander Khalifman.

Korobov won the individual gold medal for his performance on board 2 at the 2013 World Team Chess Championship, contributing to the team bronze. Also in 2013 he won the European Blitz Chess Championship.

In 2014 he competed in the 41st Chess Olympiad held in Tromsø, scoring 4½7 points. In September 2015 he took part in the Chess World Cup 2015, where he was eliminated in the second round by Dmitry Andreikin, after knocking out Dragan Šolak in round one. In the following month, Korobov won the 16th Karpov International Tournament, a round-robin tournament, in Poikovsky, Russia on tiebreak over Victor Bologan, after they both finished on 6/9 points. In August 2016, Korobov won the Karpov Tournament in Pokovsky one more time, scoring 6/9. The next month, he played on the silver medal-winning Ukrainian team at the 42nd Chess Olympiad in Baku. In 2018, he won an individual gold medal at the 43rd Chess Olympiad as the best player on the reserve board.

== Personal life ==
Korobov graduated from the University of Kharkiv's School of Foreign Languages.
