= Pouria Darini =

Iranian chess grandmaster (born 1991)

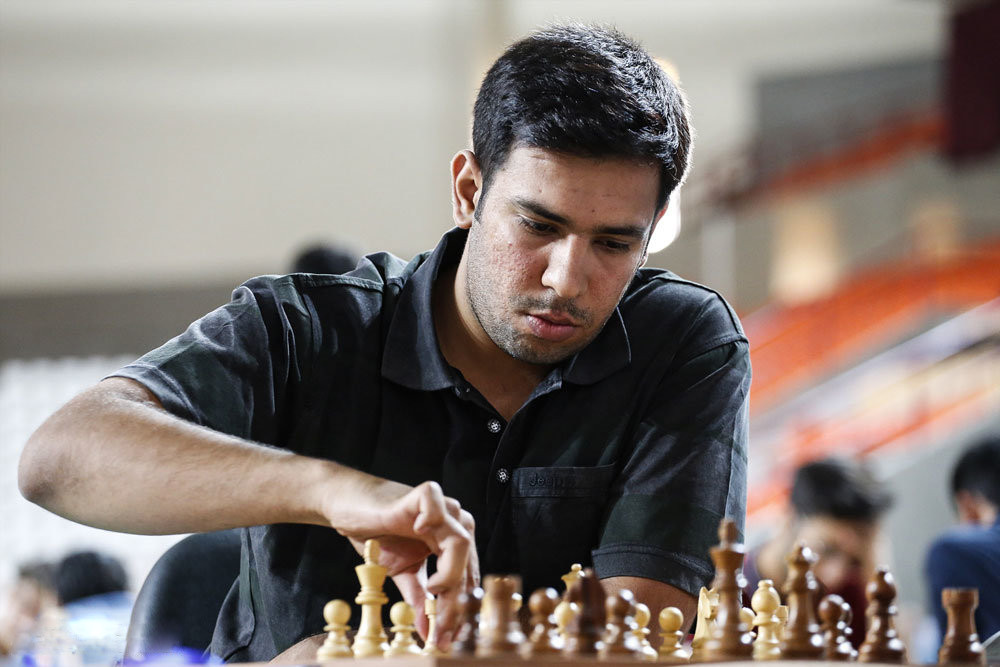

Personal information
- Born: 24 January 1991 (age 35) Jiroft, Kerman Province, Iran

Chess career
- Country: Iran
- Title: Grandmaster (2013)
- Peak rating: 2548 (June 2013)

Pouria Darini (Persian: پوریا درینی; born January 24, 1991) is an Iranian chess player. He was awarded the title of Grandmaster (GM) by FIDE in 2013.

== Chess career ==
He represented his country in the 2012 Chess Olympiad and played in the Chess World Cup 2013, where he was defeated in the first round by Dmitry Andreikin.

Darini won the Iranian Semi-final Chess Championship in 2009.

He won the 9th Ebne Sina Open Chess Tournament in Hamedan in 2010.

He won the 4th Sardaran Open in 2015.

Darini tied 3rd to 8th place in the 18th Dubai Open in 2016 with Mikhail Al. Antipov, Lazaro Bruzon Batista, Vidit Santosh Gujrathi, Alexandr Fier, and Boris Savchenko.

He achieved 4th place in the 2020 Iranian championship.
