= Elijah Emojong =

Ugandan chess player (born 1992)

Personal information
- Born: December 18, 1992 (age 33)

Chess career
- Country: Uganda
- Title: International Master (2013)
- Peak rating: 2364 (May 2017)

Elijah Emojong is a Ugandan chess player. He was East Africa's first International Master.

== Chess career ==
In August 2012, he played on board 4 for Uganda at the 40th Chess Olympiad, where he notably defeated grandmaster Ilmārs Starostīts in the first round. He became the second Ugandan player to defeat a grandmaster after Steven Kawuma had defeated Diego Valerga in the previous Olympiad.

In August 2014, he played on board 1 for Uganda at the 41st Chess Olympiad, where he scored 3/9 and won against the higher-rated Sebbar Ali in the final round.

In October 2016, he won the Mombasa Chess Open by defeating Harold Wanyama in tiebreak games.

In March 2017, he won the Cytonn Investments Open Chess Championship with an undefeated score of 6.5/7.

In November 2017, he won the Tanzania Open Chess Championship with an undefeated score of 6.5/7.
