= Ivan Popov (chess player) =

Russian chess grandmaster (born 1990)

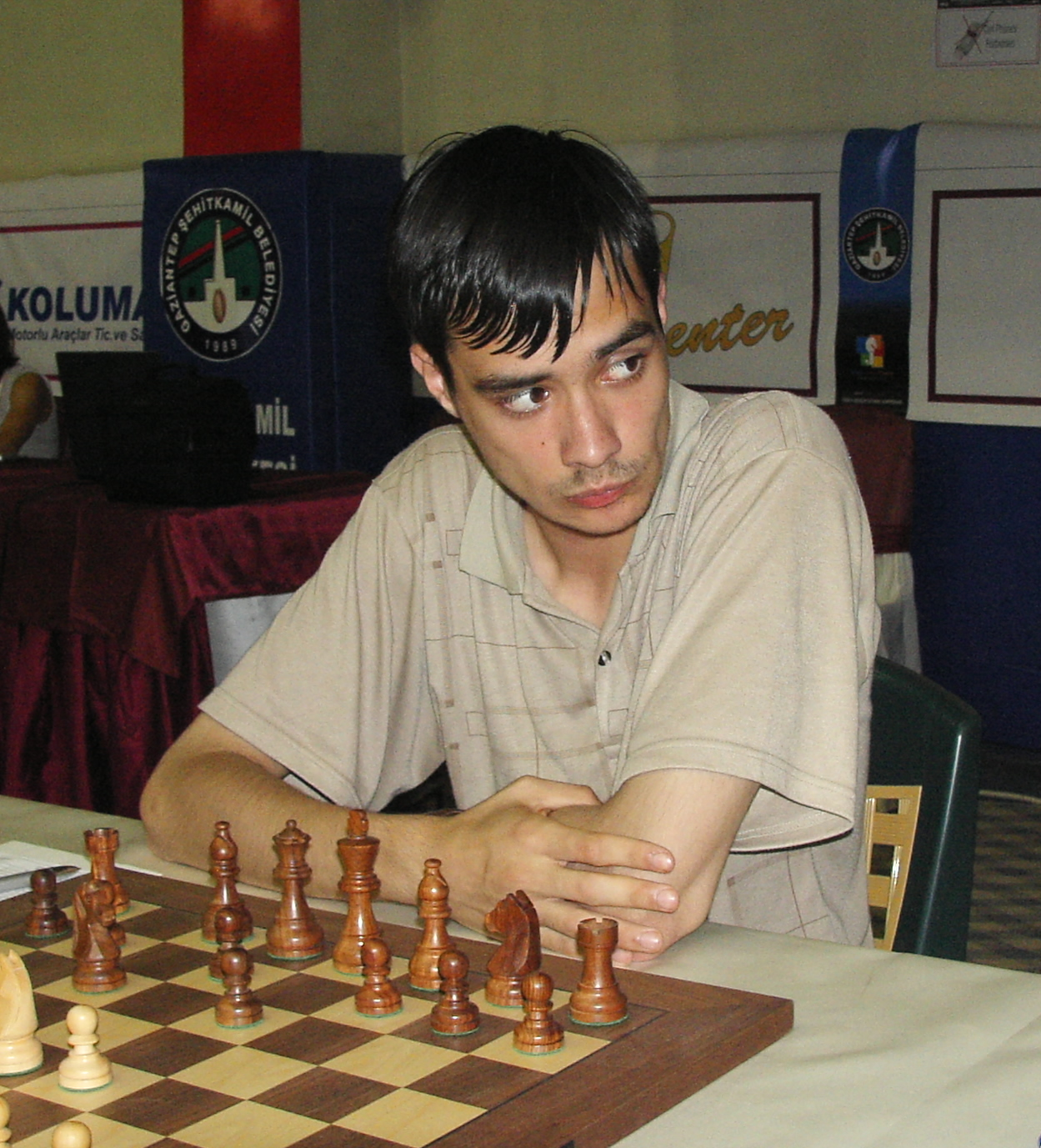
- Ivan Popov at the 2008 World Junior Championship, Gaziantep

Personal information
- Born: 20 March 1990 (age 36) Rostov-on-Don, Russian SFSR, Soviet Union

Chess career
- Country: Russia
- Title: Grandmaster (2007)
- FIDE rating: 2595 (August 2026)
- Peak rating: 2661 (September 2015)
- Peak ranking: No. 79 (September 2015)

Ivan Vladimirovich Popov (born 20 March 1990) is a Russian chess player. He was awarded the title Grandmaster by FIDE in 2007.

== Career ==
In 2006, he won the "Vanya Somov Memorial – Young Stars of the World" tournament in Kirishi, Russia, scoring 8½/11 points, half point ahead of Ian Nepomniachtchi. Popov became Russian junior champion in 2007. In the same year, he also won the under-18 division of the World Youth Chess Championships and was runner-up in the World Junior Chess Championship.

In 2012, Popov won the Moscow Chess Championship. The following year, he competed in the FIDE World Cup, where he was knocked out in the first round by Markus Ragger.

In January 2015, he won the 7th Chennai International Open. In September of the same year, he took part in the World Cup, from which he was eliminated in round one by Samuel Shankland. Two months later, Popov won the 2015 European Rapid Chess Championship in Minsk, Belarus. In January 2016, Popov won the 14th Parsvnath Delhi International Open edging out Attila Czebe and Valeriy Neverov on a tie-break score, after all three players finished on 8/10 points. Later in the same year, he played in the European Chess Club Cup for team SHSM Legacy Square Moscow, which took the bronze medal.
