= Radosław Wojtaszek =

Polish chess grandmaster (born 1987)

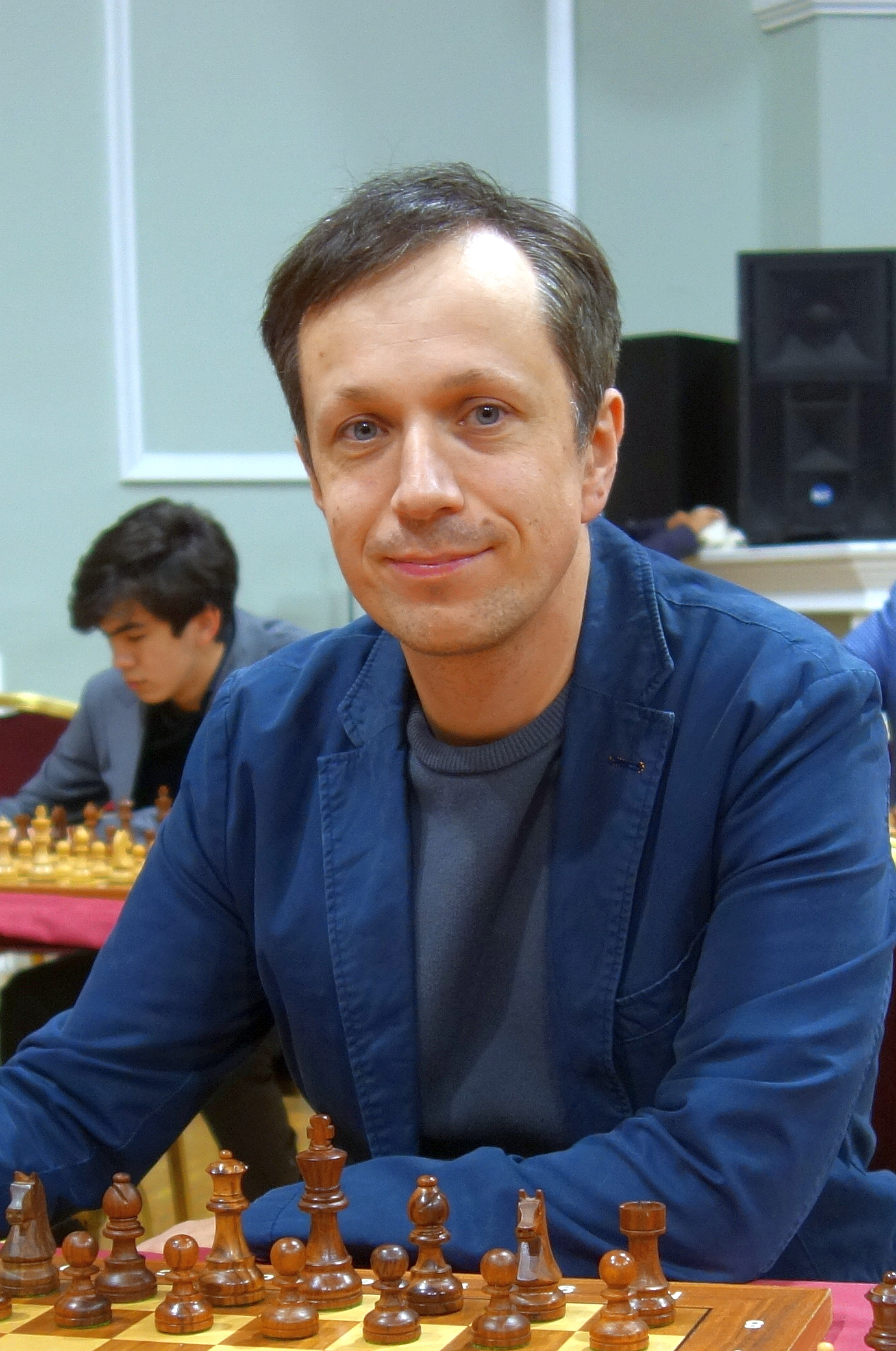
- Wojtaszek in 2023

Personal information
- Born: 13 January 1987 (age 39) Elbląg, Poland
- Spouse: Alina Kashlinskaya

Chess career
- Country: Poland
- Title: Grandmaster (2005)
- FIDE rating: 2655 (July 2026)
- Peak rating: 2750 (January 2017)
- Ranking: No. 63 (July 2026)
- Peak ranking: No. 15 (December 2014)

Radosław Wojtaszek (born 13 January 1987) is a Polish chess grandmaster. He is a six-time Polish champion.

Wojtaszek has acted as Viswanathan Anand's second, assisting the former world chess champion in his successful title defence match against Vladimir Kramnik, in 2010 against Veselin Topalov, in 2012 against Boris Gelfand, in 2013 and in 2014 against Magnus Carlsen.

== Chess career ==
In 2004, Wojtaszek won both the European Youth Chess Championships and the World Youth Chess Championships in the U18 category. In January 2005, he won the Cracovia Open with a score of 7½/9 points. He won the Polish Chess Championship for the first time in 2005.

In 2006, Wojtaszek played for the Polish team at the Chess Olympiad in Turin scoring 9 points out of 11 games. In December 2008, he won the 8th Amplico AIG Life International – European Rapid Chess Championship in Warsaw.

In 2009, Wojtaszek finished second in the Polish Championship, shared second place with Michael Roiz at the first Lublin Grandmaster Tournament and won the Najdorf Memorial in Warsaw.

In January 2010, Wojtaszek tied for 1st–5th with Eduardas Rozentalis, Pavel Ponkratov, Luke McShane and Igor Lysyj at the 39th Rilton Cup in Stockholm and finished again second in the Polish Championship. He won the 5th Polonia Wrocław Open in July 2010. In August of the same year, he won the 4th San Juan International Tournament in Pamplona with 6½/9.

At the Chess Olympiad in Khanty Mansiysk, Wojtaszek played on top board for Poland scoring 6/9. In June 2011, he won the 9th György Marx Memorial tournament in Paks, Hungary. In December 2013, he took clear first with 6/7 in the 37th Zurich Christmas Open.

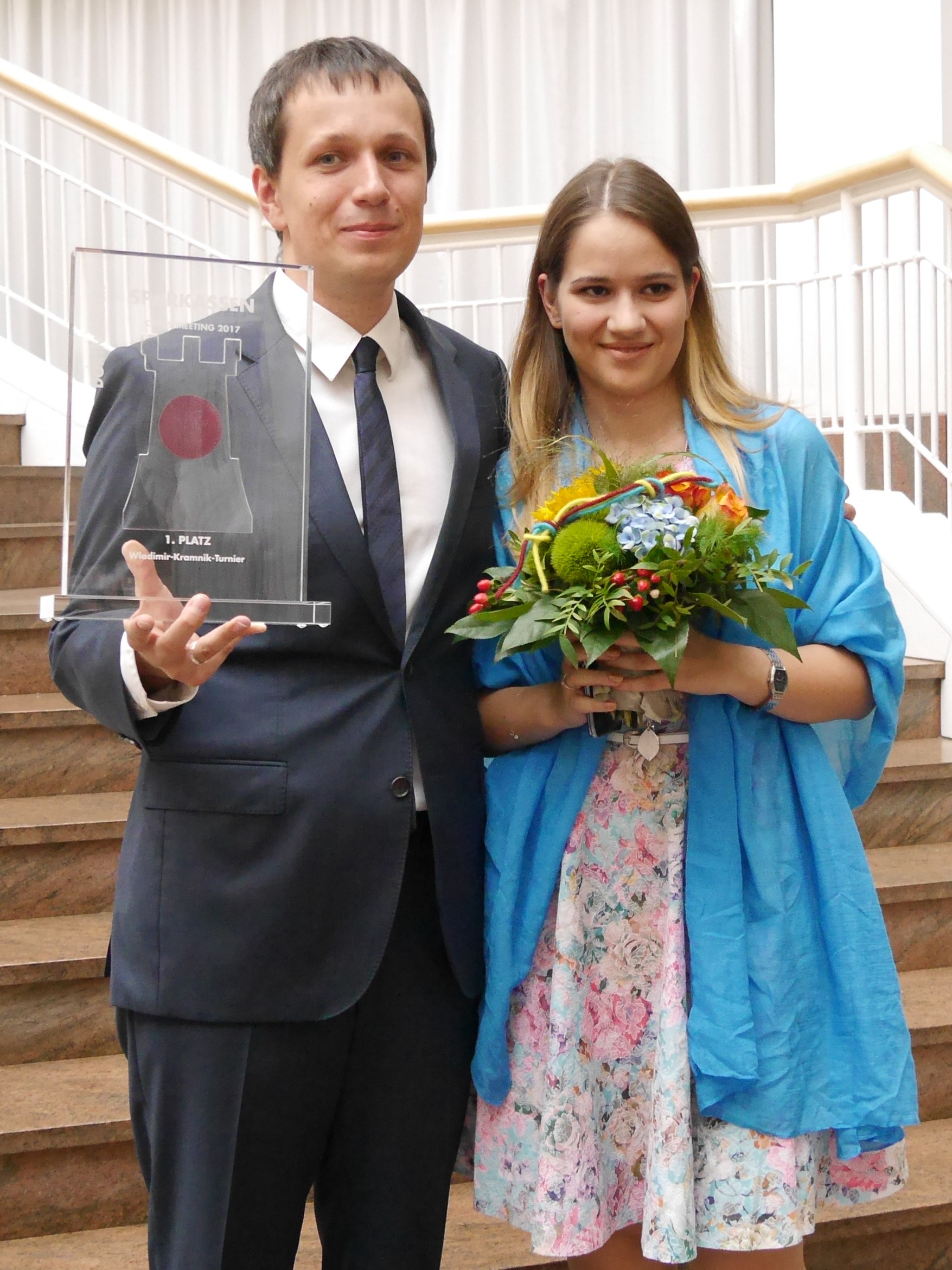
Wojtaszek and his wife Alina Kashlinskaya in 2017

In 2014, he won for the second time the Polish Championship.

In January 2015, Wojtaszek took part in Tata Steel Masters tournament in Wijk aan Zee, finishing ninth out of 14 players. He scored 5½/13 and was the only player to have defeated World Chess Champion Magnus Carlsen as well as the world's second highest rated player, Fabiano Caruana. In July 2015, he placed second in the Biel Grandmaster Tournament scoring 6/10.

In April 2016, he won the Polish Championship for the third time, scoring 6½/9.

In July 2017, Wojtaszek won the Dortmund tournament, scoring 4½ out of 7, ahead of players like Vladimir Kramnik and Maxime Vachier-Lagrave. He was unbeaten in that tournament, winning games against Wang Yue and Liviu-Dieter Nisipeanu (both with white pieces).

In April 2018, he participated in the fifth edition of Shamkir Chess, finishing fifth with a score of 4½/9 (+1–1=7).

In October 2018, his team AVE Novy Bor finished second at the 34th European Chess Club Cup held in Porto Carras, Greece. Wojtaszek drew against Magnus Carlsen, among others. In the same month, he also won the Chess.com Isle of Man International tournament with a score 7/9 after a play-off match against Arkadij Naiditsch.

In 2019, he qualified for the FIDE Grand Prix for the first time. His best result was at the Moscow tournament. In the first round he knocked out Shakhriyar Mamedyarov then Peter Svidler in the quarterfinals to progress to the semifinals. Here he was defeated by Ian Nepomniachtchi in tie-breaks, who won in the fourth rapid game, after the first three encounters finished drawn. In Hamburg and Jerusalem, he was knocked out in the first round by Alexander Grischuk and Dmitry Andreikin respectively.

In 2020, Wojtaszek won the Biel Chess Festival. The tournament format consisted of 28 games in various time controls (7 classical, 7 rapid and 14 blitz) competing against seven other highly ranked grandmasters. The final standings had him on 37 points, half a point ahead of second place Pentala Harikrishna.

Through February and March 2022, Wojtaszek played in the FIDE Grand Prix 2022 as a replacement. In the first leg and only leg in which he played, he tied for first with Richárd Rapport in Pool B with a 3.5/6 result in the classical format, and then going on to lose 0.5/2 in rapid tiebreakers. He finished the tournament with four points.

In 2023, he won silver medal in the Polish Chess Championship. In May 2024, he won the Polish Chess Championship in Rzeszów.

== Personal life ==
Wojtaszek is married to Russian-born Polish chess player Alina Kashlinskaya.
