= Wan Yunguo =

Chinese chess grandmaster (born 1990)

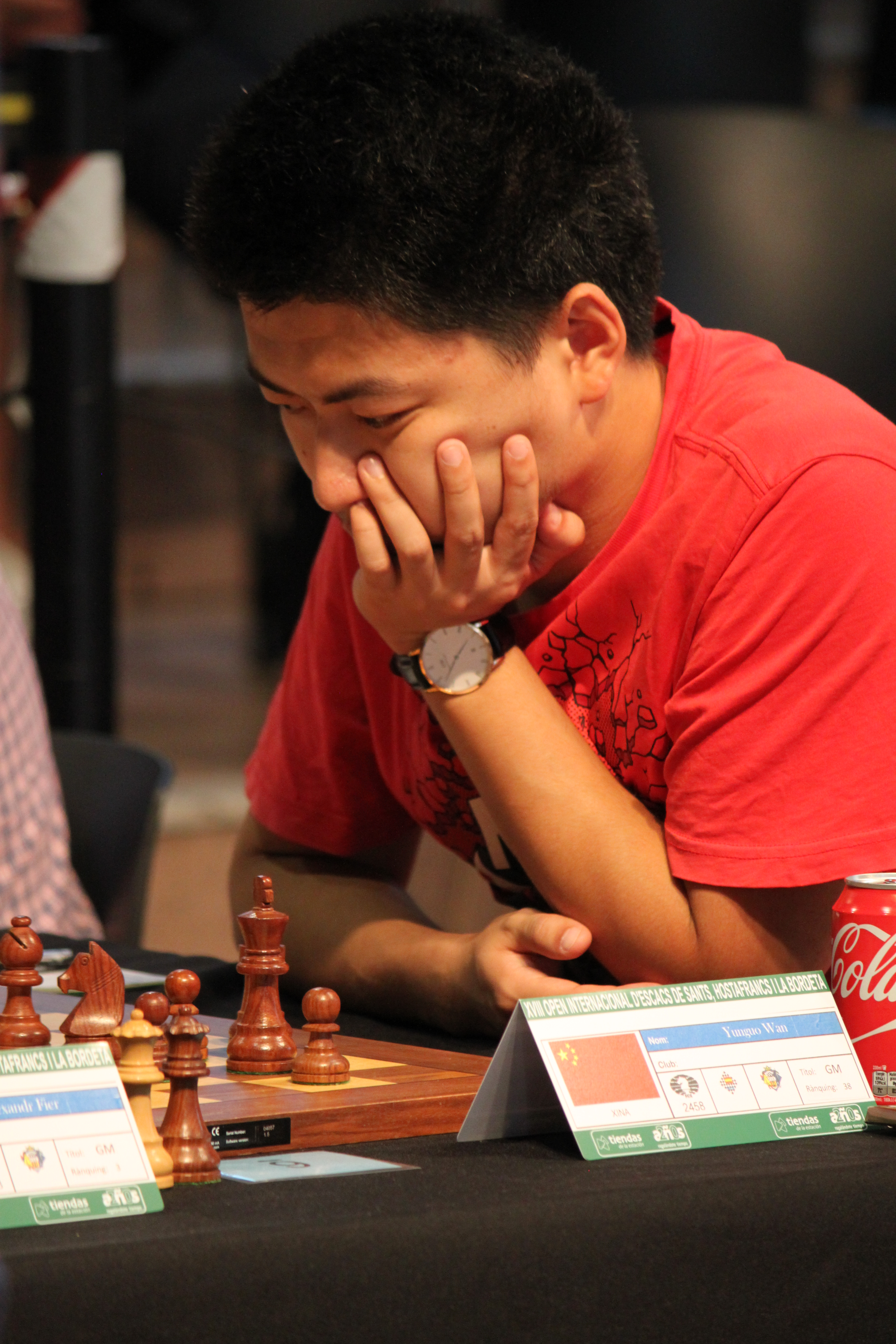

Personal information
- Born: June 28, 1990 (age 36) Shandong, China

Chess career
- Country: China
- Title: Grandmaster (2016)
- FIDE rating: 2503 (July 2026)
- Peak rating: 2531 (January 2019)

Wan Yunguo (Chinese: 万云国) is a Chinese chess Grandmaster.

== Chess career ==
He played in the Chess World Cup 2013, but was defeated by Michael Adams in the first round. He got a win against 9th seeded Adhiban Baskaran in the 9th Asian Continental. He was International Master in 2013 and Grandmaster in 2016.
