= Lou Yiping =

Chinese chess player (born 1991)

Personal information
- Born: November 22, 1991 (age 34)

Chess career
- Country: China
- Title: International Master (2010)
- FIDE rating: 2435 (July 2026)
- Peak rating: 2500 (December 2022)

Lou Yiping (Chinese: 楼一平) is a Chinese chess International Master.

== Chess career ==
He played in the Chess World Cup 2013, being defeated by Gata Kamsky in the first round.
