= Kicking & Screaming (TV series) =

American reality competition television series

- Genre: Reality competition
- Created by: Matt Kunitz; David Shumsky; Mark Harris
- Presented by: Hannah Simone
- Country of origin: United States
- Original language: English
- No. of seasons: 1
- No. of episodes: 8

Production
- Executive producers: Matt Kunitz; Anthony Dominici
- Running time: 42 minutes
- Production companies: Lionsgate Television; Pulse Creative

Original release
- Network: Fox
- Release: March 9 – April 27, 2017

Kicking & Screaming is an American reality competition television series created by Matt Kunitz, David Shumsky and Mark Harris and hosted by Hannah Simone. The series premiered on March 9, 2017 on Fox. Kicking & Screaming did not return for 2017–2018 TV season, leaving it cancelled after one season.

The show was shot in Fiji. The winning team at the end of the season split a $500,000 prize.

== Contestants ==
The cast is composed by 10 teams of two, one member of the team being a professional survivalist and one being an everyday person.

| Name | Team | Experience | Occupation | Status |
|---|---|---|---|---|
| Ben Domian | White | Survivalist | Air Force Reservist | 3rd Place |
| Juliana Herz | White | Everyday Person | Model | 3rd Place |
| Brady Cervantes | Yellow | Survivalist | Ex USMC Scout Sniper | 2nd Place |
| Claire Schreiner | Yellow | Everyday Person | Hollywood Housewife | 2nd Place |
| Terry Fossum | Purple | Survivalist | Scoutmaster | Winners (1st Place) |
| Natalie Casanova | Purple | Everyday Person | Gamer | Winners (1st Place) |
| Jason White | Orange | Survivalist | Veteran | Eliminated; 7th Episode |
| Elaine Swann | Orange | Everyday Person | Etiquette Coach | Eliminated; 7th Episode |
| John McPhee | Aqua | Survivalist | Mercenary and former 75th Ranger Regiment, Special Forces, 1st SFOD-D. | Eliminated; 5th Episode |
| Nakeisha Turk | Aqua | Everyday Person | NBA Cheerleader | Eliminated; 5th Episode |
| Tamra Hyde | Black | Survivalist | Wilderness Survival Instructor | Eliminated; 4th Episode |
| Maxwell Carr | Black | Everyday Person | Fashion Student | Eliminated; 4th Episode |
| Hakim Isler | Red | Survivalist | Ninja | Eliminated; 3rd Episode |
| Angelica Bridges | Red | Everyday Person | Actress | Eliminated; 3rd Episode |
| Caleb Garmany | Blue | Survivalist | Special Ops Veteran | Eliminated; 2nd Episode |
| Sam Shankland | Blue | Everyday Person | Chess Grandmaster | Eliminated; 2nd Episode |
| Ras Vaughan | Pink | Survivalist | Off-the-grid Survivalist | Medically Evacuated; 2nd Episode |
| Kirsten Kozak | Pink | Everyday Person | Housewife | Medically Evacuated; 2nd Episode |
| Jessie Krebs | Green | Survivalist | Former Air Force SERE (global Survival, Evasion, Resistance, and Escape) Instructor | Eliminated; 1st Episode |
| Mike Forbs | Green | Everyday Person | Delivery truck driver | Eliminated; 1st Episode |

== Contestant Progress ==
| # | Contestants | 1 | 2 | 3 | 4 | 5 | 6 | 7 | 8 |
|---|---|---|---|---|---|---|---|---|---|
| 1 | Natalie & Terry | SAFE | SAFE | RISK | WIN | WIN | WIN | SAFE | WINNERS |
| 2 | Claire & Brady | SAFE | RISK | SAFE | SAFE | SAFE | WIN | RISK | RUNNERS-UP |
| 3 | Juliana & Ben | WIN | SAFE | SAFE | SAFE | RISK | SAFE | WIN | ELIM |
| 4 | Elaine & Jason | SAFE | SAFE | WIN | SAFE | SAFE | SAFE | ELIM | |
| 5 | Nakeisha & John | SAFE | WIN | SAFE | RISK | ELIM | | | |
| 6 | Maxwell & Tamra | RISK | SAFE | SAFE | ELIM | | | | |
| 7 | Angelica & Hakim | SAFE | SAFE | ELIM | | | | | |
| 8 | Sam & Caleb | SAFE | ELIM | | | | | | |
| 9 | Kirsten & Ras | SAFE | ELIM | | | | | | |
| 10 | Mike & Jessie | ELIM | | | | | | | |

The team won Kicking and Screaming.
The team were the runners-up.
The team won the prize challenge.
The teams competed in a non-elimination challenge for a competition power.
The team competed in the elimination challenge and won, advancing to the next stage.
The team withdrew from the competition.
The team competed in the elimination challenge and lost.

== Episodes ==
| No. | Title | Original release date | US viewers (millions) |
|---|---|---|---|
| 1 | "Welcome to the Jungle" | March 9, 2017 | 2.24 |
| 2 | "The Hunger Pains" | March 16, 2017 | 1.92 |
| 3 | "Going Coconuts" | March 23, 2017 | 1.96 |
| 4 | "Jungle Love" | March 30, 2017 | 1.72 |
| 5 | "Rumble in the Jungle" | April 6, 2017 | 1.96 |
| 6 | "Real Men Cry" | April 13, 2017 | 1.92 |
| 7 | "Fear Pong" | April 20, 2017 | 1.79 |
| 8 | "Survival of the Fittest" | April 27, 2017 | 1.59 |
