= Markus Ragger =

Austrian chess grandmaster (born 1988)

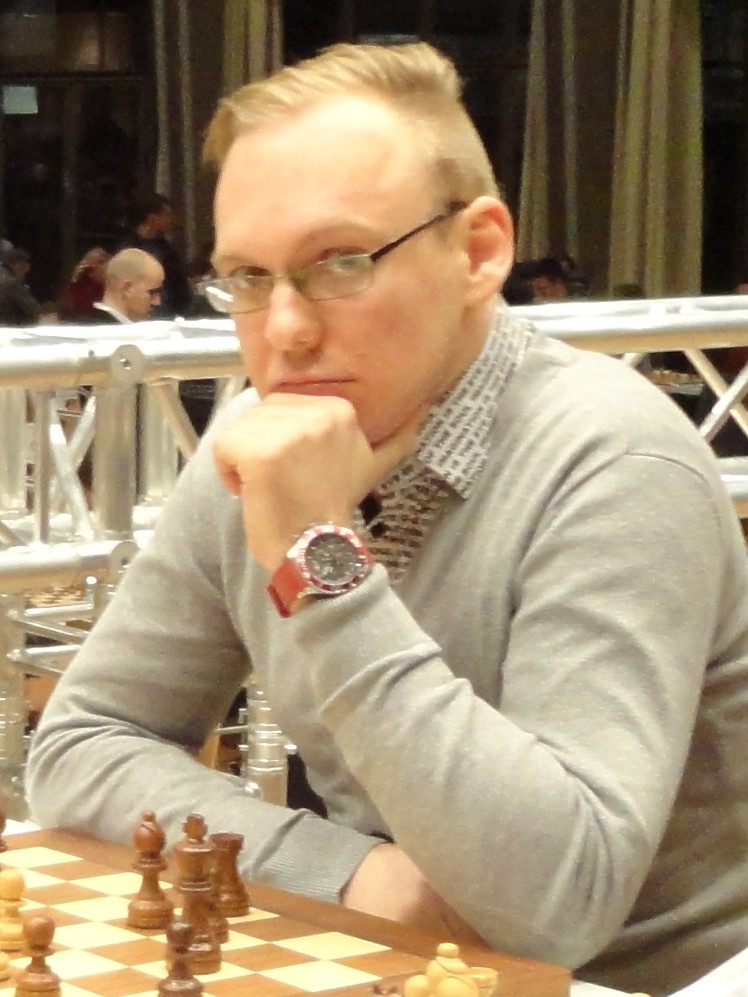
- Markus Ragger, Karlsruhe 2016

Personal information
- Born: 5 February 1988 (age 38) Klagenfurt, Austria

Chess career
- Country: Austria
- Title: Grandmaster (2008)
- FIDE rating: 2579 (July 2026)
- Peak rating: 2703 (February 2017)
- Peak ranking: No. 41 (April 2016)

Markus Ragger (born 5 February 1988) is an Austrian chess grandmaster. He won the Austrian Chess Championship in 2008, 2009 and 2010 and has played the first board for Austria in the Chess Olympiads since 2008. In October 2016, he became the first Austrian to reach a FIDE rating of 2700. His peak rating is 2703, which he reached in February 2017.

== Chess career ==
In 2011, he tied for 1st–5th with Alexander Areshchenko, Yuriy Kuzubov, Parimarjan Negi and Ni Hua in the 9th Parsvnath Open Tournament. He took part in the Chess World Cup 2011, where he was eliminated in the first round by Evgeny Alekseev. In the Chess World Cup 2013 he reached the second round and lost to Nikita Vitiugov.

In 2015, Ragger won the Politiken Cup in Helsingør on tiebreak over Liviu-Dieter Nisipeanu, Jon Ludwig Hammer, Laurent Fressinet, Tiger Hillarp Persson, Samuel Shankland, Sébastien Mazé, Mihail Marin, Sune Berg Hansen and Vitaly Kunin, after all players finished on 8/10. In the same year, he led the Austrian team to victory at the Mitropa Cup in Mayrhofen.
