= Daniil Dubov =

Russian chess grandmaster (born 1996)

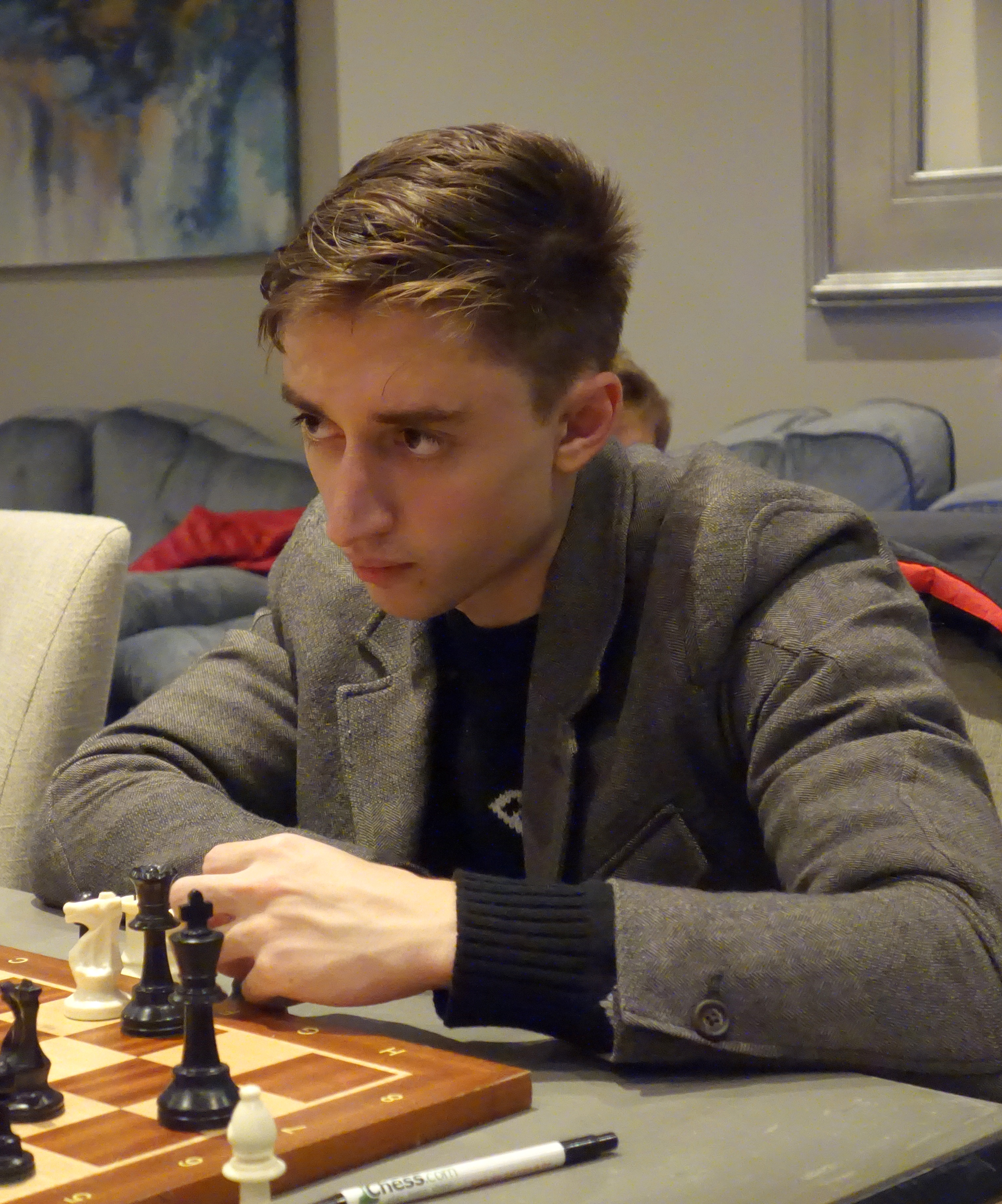
- Dubov in 2019

Personal information
- Born: Daniil Dmitrievich Dubov; 18 April 1996 (age 30) Moscow, Russia

Chess career
- Country: Russia (until 2022); FIDE (since 2022)
- Title: Grandmaster (2011)
- FIDE rating: 2652 (August 2026)
- Peak rating: 2720 (December 2021)
- Ranking: No. 66 (August 2026)
- Peak ranking: No. 24 (December 2021)

Daniil Dmitrievich Dubov (Russian: Даниил Дмитриевич Дубов; born 18 April 1996) is a Russian chess grandmaster. He achieved his final norm for the Grandmaster title at the age of 14 years, 11 months, 14 days in 2011. Dubov won the 2018 World Rapid Chess Championship held in Saint Petersburg.

== Chess career ==
=== 2006–2009 ===
Dubov won two medals at the European Youth Chess Championships: a bronze in 2006, in the U-10 division, and a silver in 2008, in the U12. In 2009 he won the Young Stars of the World – Vanya Somov Memorial in Kirishi. In the same year he played for the Russian team that won the gold medal in the World Youth Under-16 Chess Olympiad. Dubov also won the individual bronze medal on board two. He won the Russian U16 rapid and blitz championships of 2009.

=== 2011–2015 ===
In 2011 Dubov played again in the World Youth Under-16 Chess Olympiad and won the team gold and the individual bronze on board one. Dubov won the Moscow Rapid Chess Championship of 2011. Dubov shared first place with Dmitry Andreikin and Nikita Vitiugov in the Russian Championship Higher League and qualified for the Superfinal of the Russian championship (2012). In the latter he scored 4/9 points.

In January 2013, Dubov took part in the Tata Steel B tournament in Wijk aan Zee, where he scored 7½/13 points (+4-2=7) finishing fifth out of fourteen participants. At the Chess World Cup 2013 he reached the third round and was eliminated by Anton Korobov, after knocking out Sergey Fedorchuk and former FIDE World Champion Ruslan Ponomariov. In December, he played a friendly six-game match with Alexei Shirov called "Battle of Generations", which was won by the latter.

In April 2015, he tied for first with Ian Nepomniachtchi in the Aeroflot Open, placing second on tiebreak.

=== 2016 ===
Dubov won the bronze medal at the World Blitz Chess Championship 2016 in Doha, scoring 14½/21 (+10-2=9).

=== 2017 ===
He won the Russian Higher League in July 2017 in Sochi, edging out Sanan Sjugirov on tiebreak.

In the Russian Superfinal, which took place in St. Petersburg in December, Dubov shared 3rd–4th places with Vladimir Fedoseev, taking the bronze medal on tiebreak.

=== 2018 ===
Dubov served as one of Magnus Carlsen's seconds for the World Chess Championship 2018.

In December, Dubov won the World Rapid Chess Championship ahead of Carlsen, Shakhriyar Mamedyarov and Hikaru Nakamura.

=== 2019 ===
Dubov was selected as the Organizer's Nominee for the FIDE Grand Prix 2019, a stage in qualification for the World Chess Championship 2020. Dubov was enrolled in the Moscow event, the first of four tournaments for the 2019 Grand Prix cycle. The Moscow tournament was a 16-player event, with Dubov being the lowest ranked participant. After an upset victory over the highest ranked player, Anish Giri, Dubov was eliminated from the Moscow Grand Prix tournament in the quarter-finals by American grandmaster Hikaru Nakamura.

In November, Dubov also competed in the FIDE Grand Prix event in Hamburg. Once again he was the lowest seeded player in the tournament, but after upset wins over Teimour Radjabov and Peter Svidler, he was in the semifinals facing Jan-Krzysztof Duda. The two matches in classical time format were drawn and the match proceeded to tie-breakers. Dubov won the first rapid game (25+10) and needed only a draw to advance to the finals. He then lost what seemed to be a completely drawn endgame in the second match to send the match to a second set of tie breakers (10+10). After drawing with the white pieces, Dubov was finally eliminated by Duda.

=== 2020 ===
Dubov won the Lindores Abbey Rapid Challenge on 3 June, beating Ding Liren in semi-finals and Hikaru Nakamura in the final after the match went to Armageddon time control.

Dubov defeated Magnus Carlsen in the quarter-finals of Airthings Masters with a score of 2½–0½ on 30 December.

Dubov also participated in the 2020 Russian Chess Championship, where he scored 6½/11 as well as fourth place in the event.

=== 2021 ===
On 21 February, Dubov conducted a simultaneous game session at Lighthouse Children's Hospice.

He again served as a second for Magnus Carlsen in the World Chess Championship 2021 against Ian Nepomniachtchi. This was criticized by Sergey Karjakin and Sergei Shipov, saying that he should not have helped a non-Russian in a match against a fellow Russian, with Shipov saying Dubov should not play for Russia in the future. Dubov responded that he considered it to be a match between two individuals, and counter-argued that working with Carlsen would improve his chess and hence help the Russian team.

In December 2021, he was granted a wildcard entry to the FIDE Grand Prix 2022.

From 29–30 December, Dubov also participated in the World Blitz Chess Championship, where he scored 4th place with 14½/21 points.

=== 2022–Present ===
Dubov competed in the Tata Steel Chess Tournament 2022; however, he was forced to forfeit his final three games due to testing positive for COVID-19.

Through February and March 2022, Dubov played in the FIDE Grand Prix 2022. In the first leg, he tied for second with Vidit Gujrathi in Pool C with a 3/6 result. In the third leg, he finished last in Pool B with a result of 2/6, finishing 21st in the standings with three points.

Together with 43 other Russian elite chess players, Dubov signed an open letter to Russian president Vladimir Putin, protesting against the 2022 Russian invasion of Ukraine and expressing solidarity with the Ukrainian people.

In September 2022, Dubov won the 75th Russian Chess Championship after winning an Armageddon playoff against Sanan Sjugirov.

== Notable games ==
Dubov vs. Svane, Batumi 2019

Position: d8 black rook, a7 black pawn, c7 black pawn, d7 black bishop, e7 black queen, g7 black rook, b6 black pawn, g5 white knight, b4 black bishop, d4 white pawn, f4 white pawn, a3 black king, e3 white pawn, g3 black pawn, a2 white queen, b1 white king, e1 white rook

Final position
- Dubov, D. vs Svane, R. Batumi, Georgia. 2019. 22nd European Team Championship, round 7: Dubov finds mate in 13, in a game where his opponent's black king moves around the entire board, only to be mated on a3.
- Dubov, D. vs Karjakin, S. Moscow, Russia. 2020. Russian Championship Superfinal, round 11: Dubov plays a novelty gambit in the opening then later sacrifices his queen to take down a former World Championship Challenger.
- Dubov, D. vs Nepomniachtchi, I. Samarkand, Uzbekistan. 2023. World Blitz Championship, round 11: Dubov and his opponent are penalized for match fixing a draw, playing 1.Nf3 Nf6 2.Nd4 Nd5 3.Nb3 Nb6 4.Nc3 Nc6 5.Ne4 Ne5 6.Ng5 Ng4 7.Nf3 Nf6 8.Ng1 Ng8 9.Nc5 Nc4 10.Na4 Na5 11.Nc3 Nc6 12.Nb1 Nb8 13.Nf3 ½–½. Both players received 0 points for the game rather than 1/2 of a point.

== Personal life ==
Dubov learned chess at the age of 6. His grandfather was Eduard Dubov (1938–2018), an international arbiter of chess and a mathematician.

Awards
Preceded by Viswanathan Anand	World Rapid Chess Champion; 2018	Succeeded by Magnus Carlsen
