= Terry Fossum =

American actor and businessperson

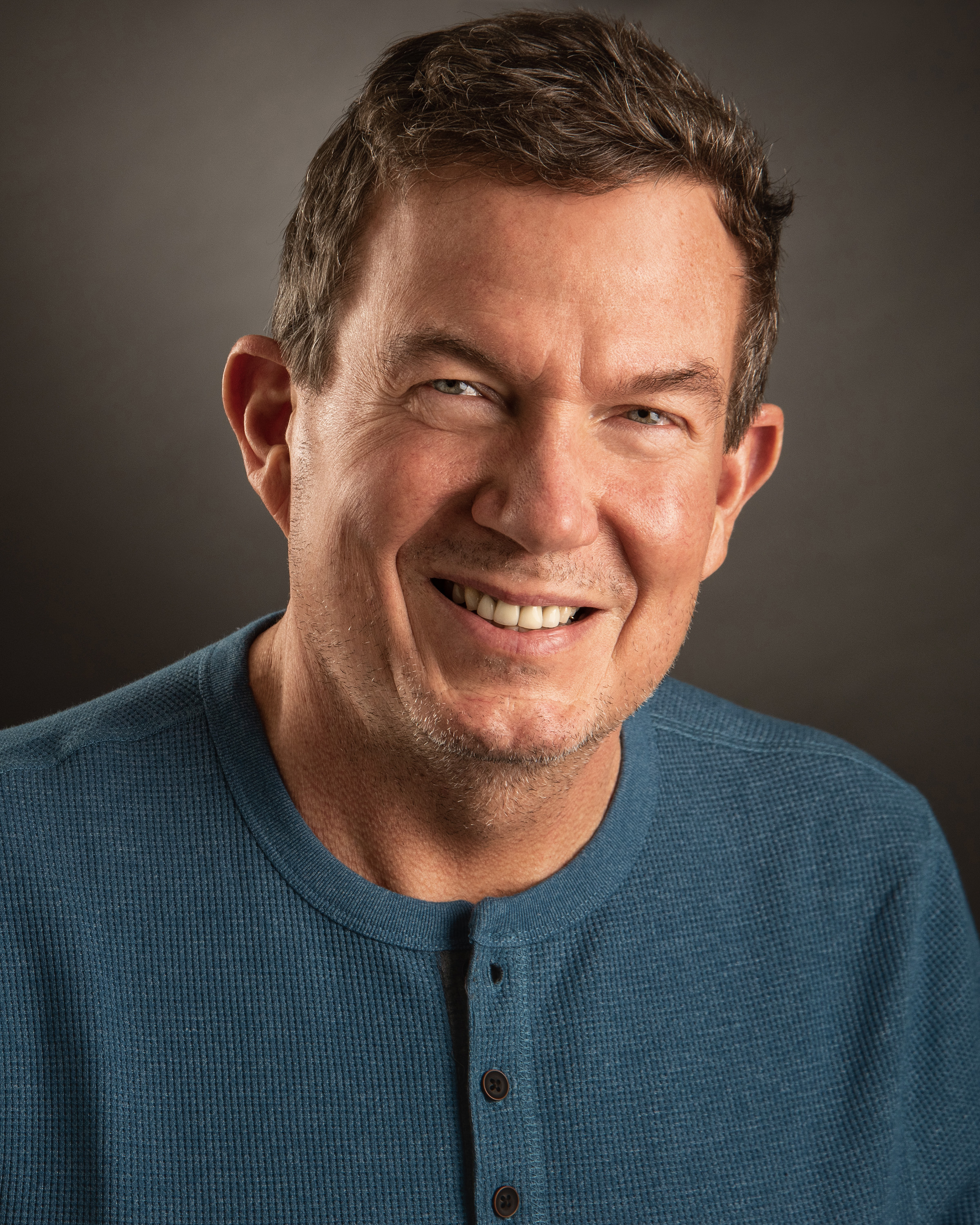
- Born: Mission, Texas, U.S.
- Education: Texas A&M University
- Occupations: Actor, producer, and businessperson
- Website: terrylfossum.com

Terry Fossum is an American actor, writer, public speaker, businessperson and philanthropist. He is best known as the winner of the 2017 reality television series Kicking and Screaming. Fossum has written several books including the #1 Wall Street Journal bestseller, The Oxcart Technique: Blueprint for Personal Success and he is recognized as “one of 30 most influential TEDx Talks of the Century” with his TEDx Talk ranking number two in the world.

== Biography ==
Fossum was born in Mission, Texas and raised in McAllen, Texas as one of three brothers. He was a member of the Boy Scouts of America rising to position of an Eagle Scout. Fossum is a pioneer student at Memorial High School graduating in 1982. He studied for a degree in mechanical engineering at Texas A&M University while serving in the Corps of Cadets before serving in the U.S Air Force where he rose to the rank of captain. He was Officer of the Year for the Fairchild Air Force Base and was the Executive Officer for a Group of Nuclear B-52 Bombers.

After his military service, Fossum went into business founding a sales company and the Terry L. Fossum Learning Center in Rwanda and the Terry L. Fossum Scholarships for Underprivileged Youth in McAllen, Texas; providing agricultural training for Malawi, Africa in 2018.

== Television ==
In 2017, Fossum appeared on Fox reality television series Kicking and Screaming, a show that paired survival experts with “wilderness impaired partners”. He and his partner Natalie Casanova won the competition, splitting the $500,000 grand prize. This then led to several million dollars in donations for the Scouts following the series airing. Fossum produced and starred in the film Role Prey which centered on the problem of human trafficking.

In 2021, Fossum received the Best Supporting Actor and Fan Favorite award at the Christian Film Festival for his role in the movie Agape. He is the host of the podcast The Comeback Chronicles.

Fossum has continued to be involved in the Boy Scouts of America, first as a scoutmaster, and eventually as the vice president for programs for the Washington State's Inland Northwest Council.

== Books ==
Fossum has written several books including the #1 Wall Street Journal Bestseller: The Oxcart Technique: Blueprint for Personal Success and Never Miss a Goal Again.
