= FIDE Grand Prix 2022 =

2022 chess tournament

FIDE Grand Prix Series 2022
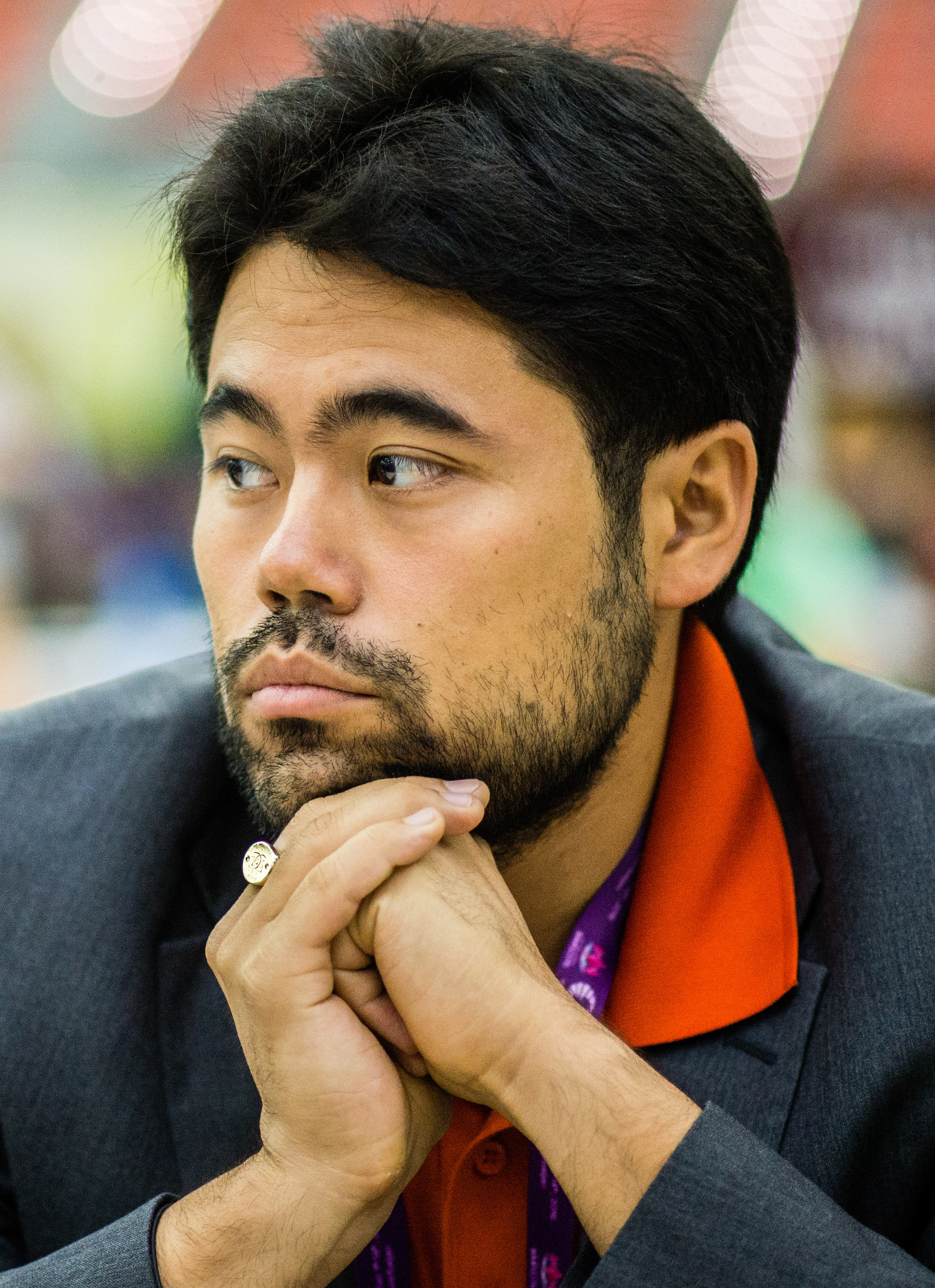
- FIDE Grand Prix 2022 winner Hikaru Nakamura

Tournament information
- Sport: Chess
- Location: (Germany) Berlin (Serbia) Belgrade
- Dates: 4 February 2022– 4 April 2022
- Administrator: FIDE
- Tournament format(s): Series of hybrid tournaments with pool stage and knockout stage
- Venues: World Chess Club Berlin in the city center at Unter den Linden 26-30; Crowne Plaza Belgrade

Final positions
- Champion: (United States) Hikaru Nakamura
- Runner-up: (Hungary) Richárd Rapport

Tournament 1
- Location: Berlin
- Dates: 4–17 February 2022
- Champion: Hikaru Nakamura
- Runner-up: Levon Aronian

Tournament 2
- Location: Belgrade
- Dates: 1–14 March 2022
- Champion: Richárd Rapport
- Runner-up: Dmitry Andreikin

Tournament 3
- Location: Berlin
- Dates: 22 March – 4 April 2022
- Champion: Wesley So
- Runner-up: Hikaru Nakamura

The FIDE Grand Prix 2022 was a series of three chess tournaments played between 4 February and 4 April 2022. The top two finishers – Hikaru Nakamura (winner) and Richárd Rapport (runner-up) – qualified for the Candidates Tournament 2022, which was the final qualification stage for the World Chess Championship 2023.

The first and last tournament took place in Berlin, Germany, and the second one in Belgrade, Serbia. Each player was scheduled to participate in two of three tournaments. Before the tie-break stage of the last tournament was concluded, Nakamura had already gained the score to win the series, and it was already clear that no other semi-finalist could overtake Rapport for the runner-up position.

== Organization ==
Due to the travel restrictions imposed by the COVID-19 pandemic, all three tournaments were initially to be played in a single city instead of playing in various cities as in previous editions.

The series was organized by World Chess. The company chose Berlin to host most of the series following a popular vote. Later it was announced that two of the three tournaments would be in Berlin, with one in Belgrade, Serbia.

== Players ==
Twenty-four players were originally invited to the Grand Prix:

- The players who placed third to eighth at the Chess World Cup 2021 who were not World Champion or already qualified for the Candidates. Five out of a possible six players qualified in this way, because World Champion Magnus Carlsen placed third in the World Cup.
- The players who placed third to eighth in the FIDE Grand Swiss Tournament 2021 who were not World Champion or already qualified for the Candidates or Grand Prix. Six players qualified in this way.
- Hikaru Nakamura, nominee of the FIDE president.
- Daniil Dubov, organizer's nominee.
- The remaining eleven places were filled by the top players in the December 2021 rating list (Note: List) so long as they had participated in the FIDE World Cup 2021 or played at least nine games which counted in the FIDE rating lists from February to December 2021. This meant Viswanathan Anand, Wang Hao, and Veselin Topalov were not eligible because of inactivity. The list originally went down to #23 in the world, though after Wei Yi withdrew, world #25 Pentala Harikrishna also qualified this way.

Ding Liren and Dmitry Andreikin were unable to compete in the first tournament due to visa and health issues respectively, and were replaced in the first tournament by Andrey Esipenko and Radosław Wojtaszek. Ding was also unable to play in the second tournament, and Andreikin took his place. Due to personal reasons, Andreikin also withdrew from the third tournament, and was replaced by Esipenko. The replacements Esipenko and Wojtaszek were eligible to qualify for the Candidates.

The table below shows the players who qualified for the Grand Prix:

Seeding	Name	Qualifying method	Rating (December 2021)	World rank (December 2021)
1	(China) Ding Liren	Rating list (3rd)	2799	3
2	(United States) Levon Aronian	Rating list (6th)	2772	6
3	(Netherlands) Anish Giri	Rating list (7th)	2772	7
4	(United States) Wesley So	Rating list (8th)	2772	8
5	(Azerbaijan) Shakhriyar Mamedyarov	Rating list (9th)	2767	9
6	(Russia) Alexander Grischuk	Rating list (10th)	2764	10
7	(Hungary) Richárd Rapport	Rating list (11th)	2763	11
8	(France) Maxime Vachier-Lagrave	Grand Swiss (6th)	2761	12
9	(United States) Leinier Domínguez	Rating list (15th)	2752	15
10	(United States) Hikaru Nakamura	Presidential nominee	2736	–
11	(Russia) Nikita Vitiugov	Rating list (19th)	2731	19
12	(India) Vidit Gujrathi	World Cup (5th-8th)	2727	22
13	(Russia) Dmitry Andreikin	Rating list (23rd)	2724	23
14	(Russia) Daniil Dubov	Organizer's nominee	2720	24
15	(India) Pentala Harikrishna	Rating list (25th)	2717	25
–	(Russia) Andrey Esipenko	Presidential nominee (Note: Replacement for Dmitry Andreikin for the first and third tournament)	2714	26
16	(China) Yu Yangyi	Grand Swiss (4th)	2713	27
17	(United States) Sam Shankland	World Cup (5th-8th)	2708	29
18	(Spain) Alexei Shirov	Grand Swiss (8th)	2704	31
19	(Russia) Vladimir Fedoseev	World Cup (4th)	2704	32
–	(Poland) Radosław Wojtaszek	Presidential nominee (Note: Replacement for Ding Liren for the first tournament)	2686	45
20	(Russia) Alexandr Predke	Grand Swiss (7th)	2682	52
21	(Russia) Grigoriy Oparin	Grand Swiss (3rd)	2681	55
22	(Germany) Vincent Keymer	Grand Swiss (5th)	2664	74
23	(Iran) Amin Tabatabaei	World Cup (5th-8th)	2643	108
24	(France) Étienne Bacrot	World Cup (5th-8th)	2642	111

== Format ==
Each player played in two out of three of the tournaments. Each tournament had 16 players, and had a two-stage format.

- In the first stage, the players were divided into four pools of four, and the players in each pool played a double round-robin mini-tournament. The four winners of the pools progressed to the second stage.
- In the second stage, the four pool winners played a knock-out tournament, consisting of semi-finals and a final. Both the semi-finals and final consisted of 2 classical time limit games, plus tie-breaks if required.

Players received Grand Prix points according to their finishing position in each tournament. The two players with the most Grand Prix points qualified for the Candidates Tournament 2022.

=== Time controls and tie-breaks ===
The time control for classical games was 90 minutes for 40 moves, plus an extra 30 minutes after move 40. There was also an increment of 30 seconds per move from move 1.

In the pool stage, if there was a tie for first, the tied players played tie-breaks. In the knockout stage, tie-breaks were played if the match was tied after the 2 regular time limit games. In both stages, two-way or three-way tie-breaks took the following format:

- Players played two rapid chess games at 15 minutes plus 10 seconds per move. In the case of a three-way tie, a single round-robin was played.
- If players were still tied, they played two blitz chess games at 3 minutes plus 2 seconds per move. In the case of a three-way tie, a single round-robin was played.
- If players were still tied, a single armageddon chess game was played to decide the winner, in which black was declared the winner if the game was drawn. The time limit was 5 minutes for white, 4 minutes for black, and a 2 second per move increment from move 61. In the case of a three-way tie, lots were drawn to determine the players, and the loser of the lot shared second place with the loser of the Armageddon game.

In the case of a four-way tie, the players were randomly divided into pairs by drawing of lots and each pair played a two-player tie-break by the above method. The two tie-break winners then played a tie-break by the above method, while the losers shared third and fourth place in the pool.

=== Grand Prix points ===
Grand Prix points were awarded as follows:

Round	Grand Prix points
Winner	13
Runner-Up	10
Semi-final loser	7
2nd in pool	4
3rd in pool	2
4th in pool	0

In other words, the top three players in each pool earned 7, 4, and 2 points, respectively, and 3 additional points were awarded for winning a semifinal or final.

The Grand Prix points for pool placings took into account tie-breaks played to determine first place. Players tied for other places, including players who were still tied after tie-breaks had decided first place, shared Grand Prix points.

If players finished tied on Grand Prix points, the following tie-breaks were applied, in order:

- number of tournament first-place finishes;
- number of tournament second-place finishes;
- number of points scored in regular time limit games;
- number of wins in regular time limit games;
- drawing of lots.

=== Prize money ===
The prize money for each event was €150,000 which was awarded as follows:

Round	Prize money
Winner	€24,000
Runner-Up	€18,000
Semi-finalist	€12,000
2nd in pools	€9,000
3rd in pools	€7,000
4th in pools	€5,000

In other words, each player received €5,000, Grand Prix points earned in the pool were worth an additional €1,000, and Grand Prix points earned in a semi-final or final were worth an additional €2,000.

== Tournament 1 - Berlin, Germany ==
The first tournament was held in Berlin, Germany from 4–17 February. Due to health and visa issues, Dmitry Andreikin and Ding Liren were replaced with Andrey Esipenko and Radoslaw Wojtaszek, respectively. Hikaru Nakamura won the first leg with Levon Aronian as the runner-up.

=== Round-robin stage ===
The double round-robin stage had the six rounds of standard time control games on 4–7, 9, and 10 February with tie-breaks on 11 February. Players in bold advanced to the knockout stage.

==== Pool A ====
Rank	Player	Rating December 2021	NAK		ESI		GRI		BAC		Total Points
1	**Hikaru Nakamura** (USA)	2736			1	½	1	½	½	½	4
2	Andrey Esipenko (RUS)	2714	½	0			½	½	1	1	3.5
3	Alexander Grischuk (RUS)	2764	½	0	½	½			1	½	3
4	Étienne Bacrot (FRA)	2642	½	½	0	0	½	0			1.5

==== Pool B ====
Rank	Player	Rating December 2021	RAP		WOJ		FED		OPA		Total Points	R1	R2	Tiebreak Points
1	**Richárd Rapport** (HUN)	2763			½	0	1	1	½	½	3.5	1	½	1.5
2	Radosław Wojtaszek (POL)	2686	1	½			½	½	½	½	3.5	0	½	0.5
3	Vladimir Fedoseev (RUS)	2704	0	0	½	½			1	1	3	-		-
4	Grigoriy Oparin (RUS)	2681	½	½	½	½	0	0			2	-		-

==== Pool C ====
Rank	Player	Rating December 2021	ARO		GUJ		DUB		KEY		Total Points
1	**Levon Aronian** (USA)	2772			1	½	½	½	1	1	4.5
=2	Vidit Gujrathi (IND)	2727	½	0			1	½	½	½	3
=2	Daniil Dubov (RUS)	2720	½	½	½	0			1	½	3
4	Vincent Keymer (GER)	2664	0	0	½	½	½	0			1.5

==== Pool D ====
Rank	Player	Rating December 2021	DOM		WSO		HAR		SHI		Total Points	R1	R2	Tiebreak Points
1	**Leinier Domínguez** (USA)	2752			0	½	½	1	1	1	4	½	1	1.5
2	Wesley So (USA)	2772	½	1			½	½	1	½	4	½	0	0.5
3	Pentala Harikrishna (IND)	2717	0	½	½	½			½	½	2.5	-		-
4	Alexei Shirov (ESP)	2704	0	0	½	0	½	½			1.5	-		-

=== Knockout stage ===
Semi-finals (12–13 February)
10	**Hikaru Nakamura** (USA)	**1½**
7	Richárd Rapport (HUN)	½
2	**Levon Aronian** (USA)	**1½**
9	Leinier Domínguez (USA)	½

Final (15–17 February)
10	**Hikaru Nakamura** (USA)	**3**
2	Levon Aronian (USA)	1

==== Semi-final 1 ====
Seed	Name	December 2021 rating	1	2	Total Points
10	**Hikaru Nakamura** (USA)	2736	1	½	1.5
7	Richárd Rapport (HUN)	2763	0	½	0.5

==== Semi-final 2 ====
Seed	Name	December 2021 rating	1	2	Total Points
2	**Levon Aronian** (USA)	2772	1	½	1.5
9	Leinier Domínguez (USA)	2752	0	½	0.5

==== Final ====
Seed	Name	December 2021 rating	1	2	R1	R2	Total Points
10	**Hikaru Nakamura** (USA)	2736	½	½	1	1	3
2	Levon Aronian (USA)	2772	½	½	0	0	1

== Tournament 2 - Belgrade, Serbia ==
The second tournament was held in Belgrade, Serbia from 1–14 March. Russian players' flags are displayed as the FIDE flag due to FIDE's decision to ban Russian and Belarusian flags from being displayed at FIDE-rated events in response to the 2022 Russian invasion of Ukraine. Richárd Rapport won the second leg of the 2022 Grand Prix with Dmitry Andreikin as the runner-up.

=== Round-robin stage ===
The double round-robin stage had six rounds of standard time control games on 1–4, 6, and 7 March with tie-breaks on 8 March. Players in bold advanced to the knockout stage.

==== Pool A ====
Rank	Player	Rating March 2022	AND		SHA		BAC		GRI		Total Points
1	**Dmitry Andreikin** (FIDE)	2724			½	½	1	½	½	1	4
2	Sam Shankland (USA)	2704	½	½			½	½	1	½	3.5
3	Étienne Bacrot (FRA)	2635	½	0	½	½			½	½	2.5
4	Alexander Grischuk (FIDE)	2758	0	½	½	0	½	½			2

==== Pool B ====
Rank	Player	Rating March 2022	GIR		VIT		TAB		HAR		Total Points
1	**Anish Giri** (NED)	2771			1	½	1	½	½	½	4
=2	Nikita Vitiugov (FIDE)	2726	½	0			½	½	½	1	3
=2	Amin Tabatabaei (IRI)	2623	½	0	½	½			½	1	3
4	Pentala Harikrishna (IND)	2716	½	½	0	½	0	½			2

==== Pool C ====
Rank	Player	Rating March 2022	RAP		GUJ		SHI		FED		Total Points
1	**Richárd Rapport** (HUN)	2762			1	1	½	½	½	½	4
2	Vidit Gujrathi (IND)	2723	0	0			1	½	1	½	3
=3	Alexei Shirov (ESP)	2691	½	½	½	0			1	0	2.5
=3	Vladimir Fedoseev (FIDE)	2704	½	½	½	0	1	0			2.5

==== Pool D ====
Rank	Player	Rating March 2022	MVL		MAM		PRE		YAN		Total Points
1	**Maxime Vachier-Lagrave** (FRA)	2761			½	½	½	1	½	½	3.5
=2	Shakhriyar Mamedyarov (AZE)	2776	½	½			½	½	½	½	3
=2	Alexandr Predke (FIDE)	2682	0	½	½	½			½	1	3
4	Yu Yangyi (CHN)	2713	½	½	½	½	0	½			2.5

=== Knockout stage ===
Semi-finals (9–11 March)
13	**Dmitry Andreikin** (FIDE)	**2½**
3	Anish Giri (NED)	1½
7	**Richárd Rapport** (HUN)	**1½**
8	Maxime Vachier-Lagrave (FRA)	½

Final (12–14 March)
13	Dmitry Andreikin (FIDE)	½
7	**Richárd Rapport** (HUN)	**1½**

==== Semi-final 1 ====
Seed	Name	March 2022 rating	1	2	R1	R2	Total Points
13	**Dmitry Andreikin** (FIDE)	2724	½	½	½	1	2.5
3	Anish Giri (NED)	2771	½	½	½	0	1.5

==== Semi-final 2 ====
Seed	Name	March 2022 rating	1	2	Total Points
7	**Richárd Rapport** (HUN)	2762	1	½	1.5
8	Maxime Vachier-Lagrave (FRA)	2761	0	½	0.5

==== Final ====
Seed	Name	March 2022 rating	1	2	Total Points
13	Dmitry Andreikin (FIDE)	2724	½	0	0.5
7	**Richárd Rapport** (HUN)	2762	½	1	1.5

== Tournament 3 - Berlin, Germany ==
The third tournament was held in Berlin, Germany from 22 March – 4 April. Due to personal reasons, Dmitry Andreikin withdrew from the third leg and was replaced by Andrey Esipenko. Wesley So won the third leg with Hikaru Nakamura as the runner-up.

=== Round-robin stage ===
The double round-robin stage had six rounds of standard time control games on 22–25, 27, and 28 March with tie-breaks on 29 March. Winners advanced to the knockout stage between 30 March – 4 April, 2022.

==== Pool A ====
Rank	Player	Rating March 2022	NAK		OPA		ARO		ESI		Total Points
1	Hikaru Nakamura (USA)	2750			1	½	1	0	½	1	4
2	Grigoriy Oparin (FIDE)	2674	½	0			1	½	1	½	3.5
3	Levon Aronian (USA)	2785	1	0	½	0			1	½	3
4	Andrey Esipenko (FIDE)	2723	0	½	½	0	½	0			1.5

==== Pool B ====
Rank	Player	Rating March 2022	MAM		KEY		DOM		DUB		Total Points	R1	R2	B1	B2	Tiebreak Points
1	Shakhriyar Mamedyarov (AZE)	2776			1	½	½	½	½	½	3.5	1	0	1	1	3
2	Vincent Keymer (GER)	2655	½	0			1	½	1	½	3.5	0	1	0	0	1
3	Leinier Domínguez (USA)	2756	½	½	½	0			½	1	3	-				-
4	Daniil Dubov (FIDE)	2711	½	½	½	0	0	½			2	-				-

==== Pool C ====
Rank	Player	Rating March 2022	WSO		SHA		PRE		MVL		Total Points	R1	R2	Tiebreak Points
1	Wesley So (USA)	2778			½	½	½	½	½	1	3.5	1	½	1.5
2	Sam Shankland (USA)	2704	½	½			½	1	½	½	3.5	0	½	0.5
=3	Alexandr Predke (FIDE)	2682	½	½	0	½			1	0	2.5	-		-
=3	Maxime Vachier-Lagrave (FRA)	2761	0	½	½	½	1	0			2.5	-		-

==== Pool D ====
Rank	Player	Rating March 2022	TAB		VIT		YAN		GIR		Total Points
1	Amin Tabatabaei (IRI)	2623			1	0	½	½	½	1	3.5
=2	Nikita Vitiugov (FIDE)	2726	1	0			½	½	½	½	3
=2	Yu Yangyi (CHN)	2713	½	½	½	½			½	½	3
4	Anish Giri (NED)	2771	0	½	½	½	½	½			2.5

=== Knockout stage ===
Semi-finals (30 March – 1 April)
10	Hikaru Nakamura (USA)	3
5	Shakhriyar Mamedyarov (AZE)	1
4	Wesley So (USA)	3
23	Amin Tabatabaei (IRI)	1

Final (2–4 April)
10	Hikaru Nakamura (USA)	1½
4	Wesley So (USA)	2½

==== Semi-final 1 ====
Seed	Name	March 2022 rating	1	2	R1	R2	Total Points
10	Hikaru Nakamura (USA)	2750	½	½	1	1	3
5	Shakhriyar Mamedyarov (AZE)	2776	½	½	0	0	1

==== Semi-final 2 ====
Seed	Name	March 2022 rating	1	2	R1	R2	Total Points
4	Wesley So (USA)	2778	1	0	1	1	3
23	Amin Tabatabaei (IRI)	2623	0	1	0	0	1

==== Final ====
Seed	Name	March 2022 rating	1	2	R1	R2	Total Points
10	Hikaru Nakamura (USA)	2750	½	½	½	0	1.5
4	Wesley So (USA)	2778	½	½	½	1	2.5

== Grand Prix standings ==
The following table shows the overall Grand Prix standings. The top two players qualified for the Candidates Tournament. Tie-breaks, in order, were as follows: tournament first places (TF), tournament second places (TS), game points in standard time control games (GP), and game wins in standard time control games (GW). If a tie persisted, the final tiebreaker was drawing of lots.

After the round-robin stage of the third tournament, the top two were confirmed to be Richárd Rapport and Hikaru Nakamura as no other player could score 20 or more Grand Prix points. During the semi-final stage, Nakamura overtook Rapport's score, securing the overall victory.

Seed	Rank	Player	Berlin	Belgrade	Berlin	Total GP points	TF	TS	GP	GW	Prize money
10	1	Hikaru Nakamura (USA)	13		10	23	1	1	12.5	6	€42,000
7	2	Richárd Rapport (HUN)	7	13		20	1	0	11	6	€36,000
4	3	Wesley So (USA)	4		13	17	1	0	9.5	4	€33,000
2	4	Levon Aronian (USA)	10		2	12	0	1	10	6	€25,000
13	5	Dmitry Andreikin (FIDE)		10		10	0	1	5.5	2	€18,000
23	6	Amin Tabatabaei (IRI)		3	7	10	0	0	7.5	4	€20,000
5	7	Shakhriyar Mamedyarov (AZE)		3	7	10	0	0	7.5	1	€20,000
9	8	Leinier Domínguez (USA)	7		2	9	0	0	7.5	4	€19,000
17	9	Sam Shankland (USA)		4	4	8	0	0	7	2	€18,000
8	10	Maxime Vachier-Lagrave (FRA)		7	1	8	0	0	6.5	2	€18,000
3	11	Anish Giri (NED)		7	0	7	0	0	7.5	2	€17,000
12	12	Vidit Gujrathi (IND)	3	4		7	0	0	6	3	€17,000
11	13	Nikita Vitiugov (FIDE)		3	3	6	0	0	6	2	€16,000
20	=14	Alexandr Predke (FIDE)		3	1	4	0	0	5.5	2	€14,000
21	=14	Grigoriy Oparin (FIDE)	0		4	4	0	0	5.5	2	€14,000
–	=16	Andrey Esipenko (FIDE)	4		0	4	0	0	5	2	€14,000
22	=16	Vincent Keymer (GER)	0		4	4	0	0	5	2	€14,000
–	18	Radosław Wojtaszek (POL)	4			4	0	0	3.5	1	€9,000
19	19	Vladimir Fedoseev (FIDE)	2	1		3	0	0	5.5	3	€13,000
16	20	Yu Yangyi (CHN)		0	3	3	0	0	5.5	0	€13,000
14	21	Daniil Dubov (FIDE)	3		0	3	0	0	5	1	€13,000
6	22	Alexander Grischuk (FIDE)	2	0		2	0	0	5	1	€12,000
15	23	Pentala Harikrishna (IND)	2	0		2	0	0	4.5	0	€12,000
24	24	Étienne Bacrot (FRA)	0	2		2	0	0	4	0	€12,000
18	25	Alexei Shirov (ESP)	0	1		1	0	0	4	1	€11,000
1	26	Ding Liren (CHN)				0	0	0	0	0	€0

Standings table legend
Players			Results				
Qualified for the Candidates via the Grand Prix	Qualified for the Candidates via another path	Did not qualify for the Candidates	Did not participate	Eliminated in group stage	Lost in the semi-finals	Runner-Up	Winner

== See also ==
- FIDE Grand Swiss
- Total Chess World Championship
- Grand Chess Tour
