= G. Akash =

Indian chess grandmaster (born 1996)

Personal information
- Born: Akash Ganesan; 1 October 1996 (age 29) Chennai, India

Chess career
- Country: India
- Title: Grandmaster (2020)
- FIDE rating: 2415 (July 2026)
- Peak rating: 2495 (April 2020)

Akash Ganesan (born 1 October 1996) is an Indian chess grandmaster and former national champion. He currently holds national record in chess for being Youngest National Chess Champion at the age of 16 years and 14 days.

He represented India in World Cup 2013, In the first round he was eliminated by World Championship challenger Fabiano Caruana with 1.5 - 0.5 score favoring the Italian-American. In 2013, he won gold medal in Commonwealth Junior category held at South Africa. In 2014, Akash went on to pursue electronic and communication engineering degree at College of Engineering, Guindy, Anna University. He took a break from chess for those 4 years. In 2019 December, He completed his 3rd GM norm and Secured silver medal in National Senior championship held at Sikkim. In 2020 February, Akash won Prague International Chess Festival Open 2020 and got qualified for Prague International Chess Festival Challengers 2021. His Grandmaster title was confirmed at the 2nd Council Meet of FIDE for the year 2020 that was held on 3 July 2020.
