= Samy Shoker =

Egyptian chess grandmaster (born 1987)

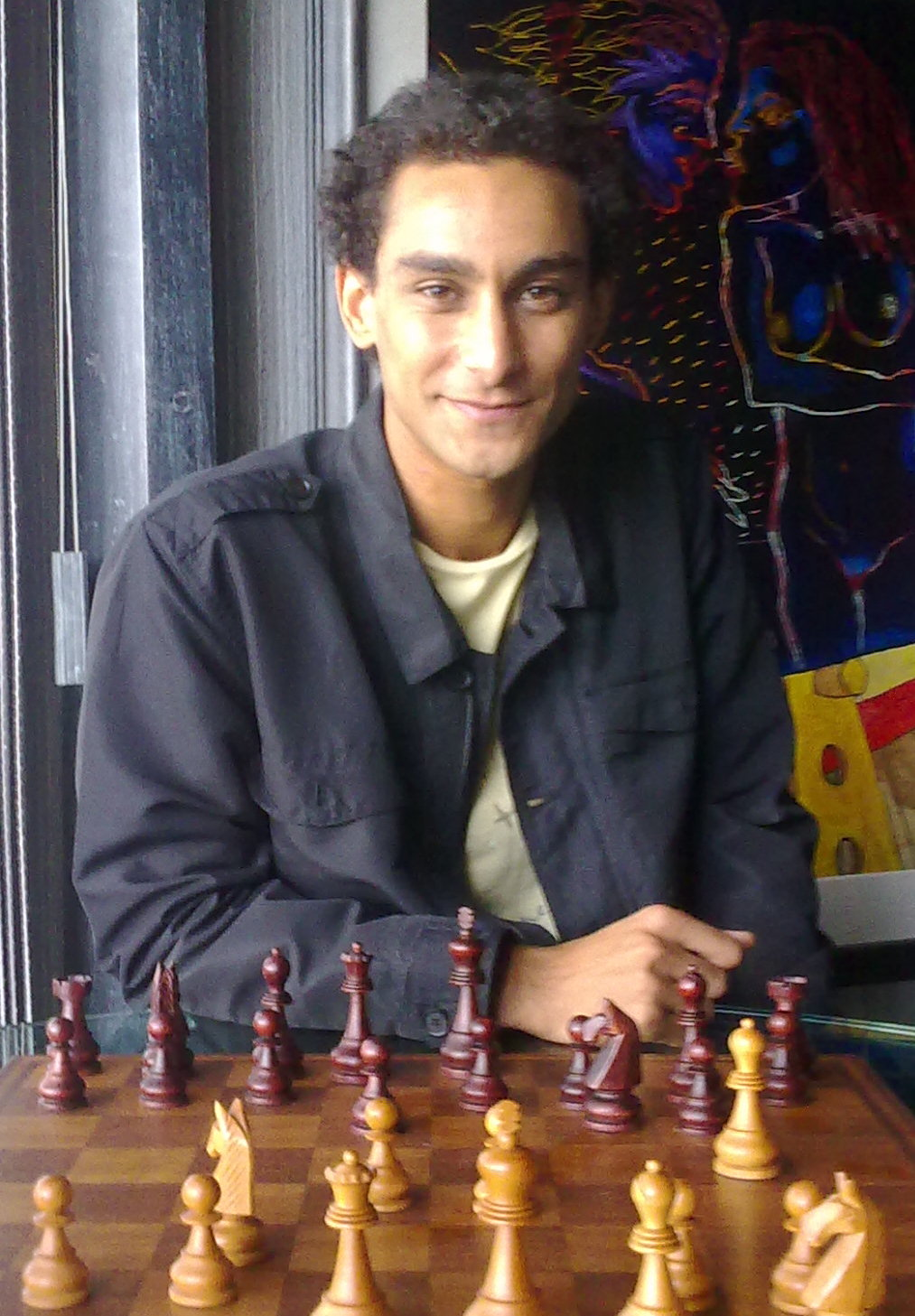

Personal information
- Born: August 1, 1987 (age 38) Asnières-sur-Seine, France

Chess career
- Country: France (until 2009); Egypt (since 2009)
- Title: Grandmaster (2014)
- FIDE rating: 2443 (July 2026)
- Peak rating: 2517 (January 2012)

Samy Shoker (born 1987) is an Egyptian chess Grandmaster and chessboxer.

== Chess career ==
Shoker earned his International Master title in 2006 and was awarded the title of Grandmaster by FIDE in 2014. He played in the Chess World Cup 2013, where he was defeated in the first round by Shakhriyar Mamedyarov. He represented his country at the 2014 Chess Olympiad, scoring 4½/9 (+4–4=1).

== Chess boxing career ==
In 2025, Shoker beat German chessboxer André Glenzer to win the WCBA European middleweight title.
