= Sam Shankland =

American chess grandmaster (born 1991)

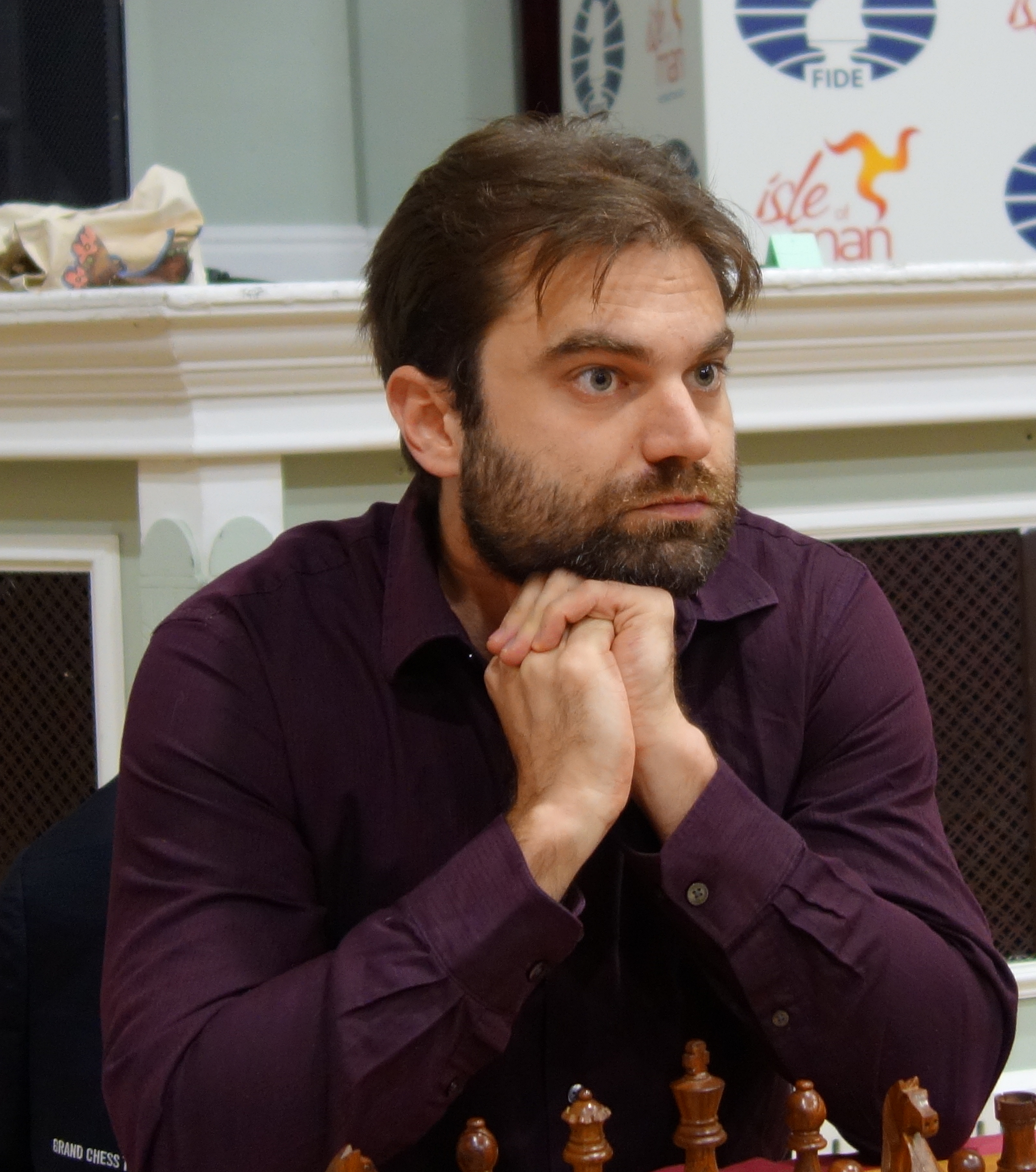
- Shankland in 2023

Personal information
- Born: Samuel L. Shankland; October 1, 1991 (age 35) Berkeley, California, U.S.

Chess career
- Country: United States
- Title: Grandmaster (2011)
- FIDE rating: 2646 (October 2026)
- Peak rating: 2731 (February 2019)
- Ranking: No. 72 (October 2026)
- Peak ranking: No. 24 (February 2019)

Samuel L. Shankland (born October 1, 1991) is an American chess grandmaster. He won the U.S. Chess Championship in 2018.

Shankland was California State Champion in 2008, 2009, 2011 and 2012, and Champion of State Champions in 2009. He won bronze at the 2008 World U18 Championship, and was US Junior Champion in 2010. He earned his international master title in 2008 and his grandmaster title in 2011. Shankland surpassed a FIDE rating of 2600 in 2012, and entered the world's top 100 players in 2014.

As a member of the United States team, he won the gold medal for the best individual performance on the reserve board at the 41st Chess Olympiad. He also was part of the team at the 42nd Chess Olympiad, where the United States won team gold for the first time in forty years. In 2018, he won the U.S. Chess Championship, simultaneously breaching the 2700 barrier for the first time in his career.

== Early and personal life ==
Shankland was born in Berkeley, California, to Leslie and Jim Shankland. He lived there until he was four, when his brother was born and the family moved to Orinda.

His father taught him how to play chess at the age of 6, but he did not give the game much attention until he joined the chess club at Glorietta Elementary School in fourth grade. He quickly surpassed the level of chess at Glorietta, and began playing in tournaments by the age of 11.

In 2014, he graduated from Brandeis University with a BS in economics.

In 2016, he competed in the first season of FOX's reality game show Kicking & Screaming, finishing in eighth place with his survivalist partner Caleb Garmany.

== Chess career ==
=== 2008 ===
Shankland began his rise to prominence in 2008, winning the Pacific Coast Open and the California State Championship. He made his international debut at the World Youth Chess Championship under-18 section, where he tied for first place with Ivan Saric and Nguyen Ngoc Truong Son, taking home the bronze medal on tiebreak score and earning the title of International Master.

=== 2010 ===
After losing his first two games in the 2010 US Junior Championship, Shankland won six out of the last seven rounds to tie for first place, and went on to clinch sole first with two back to back Armageddon victories over Ray Robson and Parker Zhao. This result qualified him for the 2011 U.S. Chess Championship.

=== 2011 ===
In January 2011, Shankland earned the title of Grandmaster at the Berkeley International.

He finished third in the 2011 U.S. Chess Championship, after first defeating Alexander Onischuk in a playoff game, and then Robert Hess in an Armageddon match. This result qualified him for the 2011 FIDE World Cup.

In the 2011 World Cup, Shankland defeated Hungarian super-grandmaster Peter Leko in the first round, but lost to Abhijeet Gupta in the second. Shankland's victory over Leko in the first round was the biggest upset of the tournament.

=== 2012 ===
Shankland won the Northern California International ahead of strong GMs Georg Meier, Alejandro Ramirez, Yury Shulman, and Bartlomiej Macieja.

=== 2013 ===
In 2013, Shankland made his debut for the US national team at the Pan American Team Chess Championship in Campinas, Brazil, leading them to victory with a performance rating over 2800.

Shankland was selected as the 27th Samford Fellow. The Samford is a fellowship given once a year to a promising young American player, providing the funds necessary for the recipient to devote him or herself to chess without being restrained by financial concerns.

Shankland clinched first place at the ZMDI Open in Dresden, Germany, edging out on tiebreak score Mikhailo Oleksienko and Georg Meier.

=== 2014 ===
At the 41st Chess Olympiad in Tromsø, Norway, Shankland took home gold for his performance as a reserve player. Going undefeated, he scored 9 points out of 10 games, giving him a performance rating of 2829 for this tournament. In round 8, Shankland defeated legendary GM Judit Polgar in her last professional game. Polgar announced her retirement from chess at the end of the event.

Shankland shared first place at the American Continental Championship, qualifying him for the 2015 World Cup.

On December 14, 2014, Shankland broke into the top 100 chess players worldwide.

=== 2015 ===
Following his gold medal in Tromsø, Shankland was promoted to first board of team USA for the World Team Chess Championship, where he played with a performance rating over 2700 and drew against elite players Levon Aronian, Alexander Grischuk, and Boris Gelfand, all of whom were in the top fifteen players worldwide at the time.

Shankland took third place in the Tata Steel Challengers group, with a score of 9.0/13 and a performance rating of 2695.

Shankland competed in the 2015 Chess World Cup, where he defeated GM Ivan Popov in the first round, but lost in a tiebreak in the second round to GM Hikaru Nakamura.

=== 2016 ===
In March 2016, Shankland took first place in the Fagernes International. In June, 2016, he won the Edmonton International. In August, 2016, Shankland won the 49th Biel Masters. In September, 2016, Shankland played as fourth board for the United States at the 42nd Chess Olympiad, where the team earned gold for the first time since 1976. In September 2016, he was ranked 57th in the world with an Elo rating of 2679.

=== 2017 ===
In December 2017, Shankland was runner-up at Sunway Sitges International Chess Festival, in Sitges (Barcelona, Spain), with a score of 6.0/9 (half a point behind GM Aravinth), after defeating GM Salem Saleh in a blitz chess play-off for the second place. He played the regular tournament with a performance rating of 2713.

=== 2018 ===
In April, Shankland took clear first in the US Chess Championship with a score of 8 1/2/11 (+6–0=5). He finished half a point, two points, and three points ahead of Fabiano Caruana, Wesley So, and Hikaru Nakamura, respectively. He took home $50,000 in prize money, and increased his rating to 2701 in the process, breaking the 2700 barrier for the first time in his career and becoming the seventh American to pass the 2700 barrier.

In May, he won the Capablanca Memorial, scoring 7 1/2/10 (+5–0=5) for a performance rating of 2831. This result vaulted him further up the world rankings, putting him at No. 30 with a live rating of 2717.

In June, he won the American Continental Chess Championship, finishing clear first with 9/11 (+7–0=4).

=== 2019 ===
In January, Shankland finished with 6.5/13 at the Tata Steel Masters, sharing 7th place in what has been called the strongest tournament in the world. He drew his first ever game with World Champion Magnus Carlsen, and he defeated former World Champion Vladimir Kramnik in the final round (Kramnik's final classical game before retiring). Shankland reached a peak rating of 2731 and #22 in the World.

=== 2021 ===
In June, Shankland won the Prague Masters with 5.5/7 and a performance rating over 2900, the best result in the tournament's history.

Shankland reached the quarterfinals of the Chess World Cup 2021, earning a spot in the 2022 FIDE Grand Prix. In the quarterfinals he lost on tiebreaks to GM Sergey Karjakin, 4–2.

=== 2022 ===
Through February and March 2022, Shankland played in the FIDE Grand Prix 2022. In the second leg, he placed second in Pool A with a 3.5/6 result. In the third leg, he tied for first with Wesley So in Pool C with a result of 3.5/6 but lost in rapid tiebreakers with a result of 0.5/2. He finished ninth in the standings with eight points.

=== 2024 ===
In May, Shankland tied for first in Sharjah Masters 2024 with GM Bardiya Daneshvar, GM Volodar Murzin, and GM Shamsiddin Vokhidov, ultimately placing third on tiebreaks.

=== 2025 ===
Shankland won the 2025 American Continental Chess Championship, held in Brazil in May, qualifying him directly for the FIDE Chess World Cup 2025. He competed at the FIDE Grand Swiss Tournament 2025, held in Uzbekistan in September, where he finished in 64th place with 5.5/11 (tied for 51st with 20 other players before applying the tie-break criteria). He also reached the quarter-finals of the FIDE Chess World Cup 2025 in November after defeating Vasyl Ivanchuk, Vidit Gujrathi, Richárd Rapport, and Daniil Dubov, before losing to Andrey Esipenko in the rapid tie-breaks.

=== 2026 ===
Shankland successfully defended his Continental title in June, scoring a dominating 9.5/11, 1.5 points ahead of the field, with a performance rating of 2729. This again directly qualified Shankland to the FIDE Chess World Cup.

== Books ==
- Shankland, Sam (2018). Small Steps to Giant Improvement: Master Pawn Play in Chess. Quality Chess. ISBN 9781784830502.
- Shankland, Sam (2020). Small Steps 2 Success: Mastering Passed Pawn Play. Quality Chess. ISBN 9781784830892.
- Shankland, Sam (2024). Theoretical Rook Endgames. Quality Chess. ISBN 9781784831967.

== Chessable Publications ==
- Shankland, Sam (2020). Sam Shankland's 1. d4 - Part 1: Sidelines. Chessable.
- Shankland, Sam (2020). Sam Shankland's 1. d4 - Part 2. Chessable.
- Shankland, Sam (2020). Shankland's Semi-Slav. Chessable
- Shankland, Sam (2021). Sam Shankland's 1. d4 - Part 3. Chessable.
- Shankland, Sam (2021) Lifetime Repertoires: Berlin Defense. Chessable
- Shankland, Sam (2021) Lifetime Repertoires: Classical Sicilian. Chessable
- Shankland, Sam (2023) Lifetime Repertoires: Neo-Catalan part 1. Chessable
- Shankland, Sam (2023) Lifetime Repertoires: Neo-Catalan part 2. Chessable
- Shankland, Sam (2023) Lifetime Repertoires: Neo-Catalan part 3. Chessable
- Shankland, Sam (2024) Total Board Vision for Beginners Chessable

Awards and achievements
Preceded by Wesley So	US Chess Champion; 2018	Succeeded by Hikaru Nakamura
