= Sebbar Ali =

Moroccan chess player (born 1981)

Personal information
- Born: November 18, 1981 (age 44)

Chess career
- Country: Morocco
- Title: International Master (2013)
- FIDE rating: 2400 (July 2026)
- Peak rating: 2404 (July 2017)

Sebbar Ali is a Moroccan chess International Master.

== Chess career ==
Sebbar won the 2013 Moroccan Chess Championship, has represented his country in a number of chess olympiads, including 2004 and 2014, and played in the Chess World Cup 2013, being defeated by Sergey Karjakin in the first round.
