= Liu Qingnan =

Chinese chess grandmaster (born 1992)

Personal information
- Born: May 23, 1992 (age 34) Shandong, China

Chess career
- Country: China
- Title: Grandmaster (2015)
- FIDE rating: 2537 (July 2026)
- Peak rating: 2551 (June 2019)

Liu Qingnan (Chinese: 刘庆南; born May 23, 1992) is a Chinese chess Grandmaster.

== Chess career ==
He played in the Chess World Cup 2013, being defeated by Wang Hao in the first round.
