= Conrad Holt =

American chess grandmaster (born 1993)

- Holt in 2012

Personal information
- Born: Conrad William Holt; July 9, 1993 (age 33) Wichita, Kansas, U.S.

Chess career
- Country: United States
- Title: Grandmaster (2012)
- FIDE rating: 2532 (September 2026)
- Peak rating: 2592 (July 2018)

Conrad William Holt (born July 9, 1993) is an American chess grandmaster who received the FIDE title of Grandmaster (GM) in September 2012.

== Chess career ==
Holt earned his USCF expert rating of 2000+ in October 2007 at Derby, Kansas. He went on to achieve his National Master title nine months later, in the World Open in Philadelphia. In 2008, Holt won the US Cadet Championship, earning him his first International Master norm, and in July 2009, he achieved his FIDE Master title, crossing 2300 rating for the first time. In 2010, Holt gained his second IM norm in the 2010 World Open.

Holt became a Senior Master in 2011, and achieved his third grandmaster norm by drawing Alexander Lenderman in the 2012 Dallas GM invitational. With 5.0/10 in the event overall and crossing the 2500 FIDE rating mark, Holt gained his GM-elect title, which was confirmed later on in the year.

In August 2014, Holt won the 2014 US Open Championship, finishing tied for first place and winning in a tie-break playoff game.

== Other ==
Conrad Holt is a strong internet blitz player, playing on such chess servers as ICC and Chess.com. While a physics student at the University of Texas at Dallas, Holt was a member of the UT Dallas chess team.
