= Alexander Areshchenko =

Ukrainian chess grandmaster (born 1986)

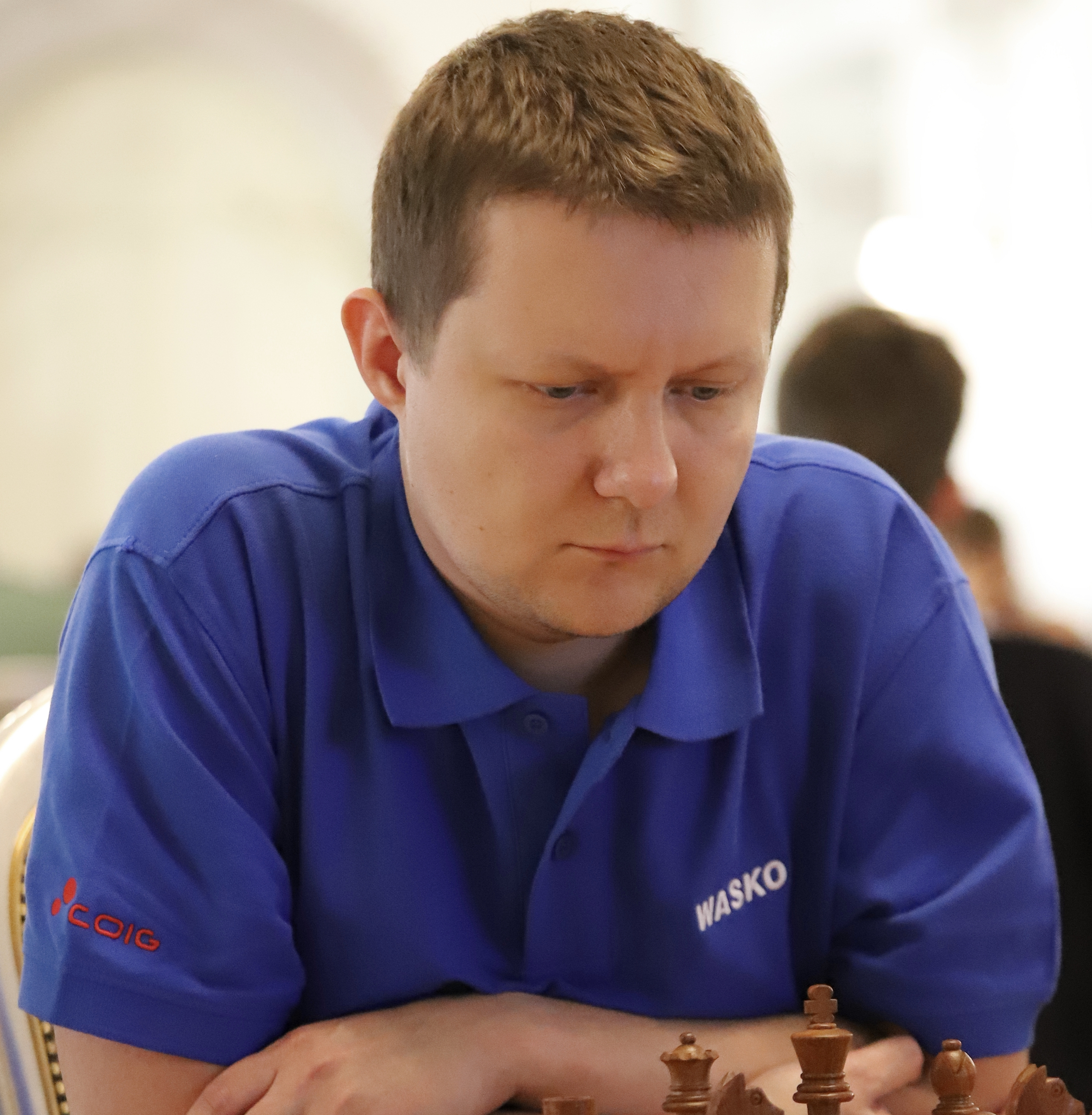
- Areshchenko in 2021

Personal information
- Born: 15 June 1986 (age 40) Voroshilovgrad, Ukrainian SSR, Soviet Union

Chess career
- Country: Ukraine
- Title: Grandmaster (2002)
- FIDE rating: 2598 (August 2026)
- Peak rating: 2720 (December 2012)
- Peak ranking: No. 28 (December 2012)

Alexander Valentinovich Areshchenko (Ukrainian: Олександр Арещенко, romanized: Oleksandr Areshchenko; born June 15, 1986) is a Ukrainian chess player. He was awarded the title of Grandmaster in 2002. He has competed in the FIDE World Cup in 2005, 2009, 2013, 2015 and 2021.

== Career ==
In 2000, Areshchenko won the Under 14 division of the World Youth Chess Championships, held in Oropesa del Mar, Spain, ahead of future super-grandmaster Wang Yue. He won the Ukrainian Championship in 2005. In 2007 he tied for 2nd–4th with Hikaru Nakamura and Emil Sutovsky in the 5th GibTelecom Chess Festival.

In 2009 he tied for 1st–4th with Koneru Humpy, Evgenij Miroshnichenko and Magesh Panchanathan in the Mumbai Mayor Cup, which he won on a tiebreak. In the same year, he tied for first with Boris Avrukh in the Zurich Jubilee Open tournament and again won the event on a tiebreak.

In 2011, Areshchenko tied for 1st–5th with Yuriy Kuzubov, Parimarjan Negi, Markus Ragger and Ni Hua in the 9th Parsvnath Open tournament. The following year, he won the Chigorin Memorial and the Botvinnik Memorial tournaments, both held in Saint Petersburg, Russia. In 2015, he tied for 1st-5th places with Nils Grandelius, Martyn Kravtsiv, Baadur Jobava and Richárd Rapport in the Masters tournament of the 22nd Abu Dhabi International Chess Festival. In 2016, he won the 20th Open International Bavarian Championship in Bad Wiessee, Germany. In 2017 he tied for 4th-14th places at the European Individual Chess Championship.

Playing for Ukraine, Areshchenko has won the team bronze medal at the World Team Chess Championship in 2011 and 2013, and an individual silver medal in the European Team Chess Championship in 2007.

In 2017, Areshchenko announced that he was retiring from chess. He has continued to play in leagues and tournaments since then.

== Sample game ==
Rublevsky vs. Areshchenko, 2005

Position: g1 white king, f1 white rook, g2 white bishop, f2 white pawn, e2 white knight, d2 white queen, e3 white bishop, b3 white pawn, a3 white pawn, g4 white pawn, d4 white pawn, e5 black pawn, d5 white pawn, b5 black pawn, a6 black pawn, h7 black pawn, g7 black pawn, f7 black pawn, e7 black bishop, d7 black knight, b7 black bishop, g8 black king, e8 black rook, c8 black queen

position after 19.exd5
- White: Sergei Rublevsky
- Black: Alexander Areshchenko

2005, Russian team championships
1.e4 c5 2.Ne2 d6 3.g3 Nf6 4.Bg2 e5 5.c3 Be7 6.d4 cxd4 7.cxd4 O-O 8.Nbc3 a6 9.O-O b5 10.a3 Bb7 11.Be3 Nbd7 12.h3 Re8 13.g4 Nb6 14.b3 Rc8 15.Rc1 Nfd7 16.Qd2 d5 17.Nxd5 Nxd5 18.Rxc8 Qxc8 19.exd5 (diagram) e4 20.Nc3 Bxa3 21.Nxe4 Qa8 22.Nc5 Bxd5 23.Bxd5 Qxd5 24.Nxd7 Qxd7 25.b4 a5 26.bxa5 Qd5 27.Qd3 b4 28.a6 h5 29.Bf4 hxg4 30.hxg4 Ra8 31.Re1 Bb2 32.Re4 b3 33.Qf3 Bxd4 34.Bc1 Qc6 35.Ba3 b2 36.Bxb2 Bxb2 37.Qe2 Bf6 38.a7 g5 39.Qe3 Kg7 40.Rb4 Qd7 (0-1)
