= Dmitry Andreikin =

Russian chess grandmaster (born 1990)

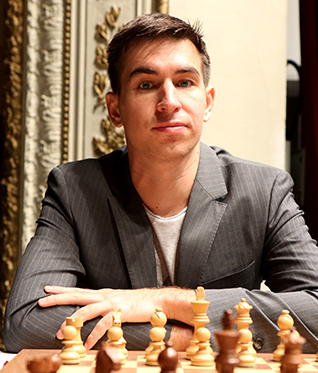
- Andreikin in 2018

Personal information
- Born: Dmitry Vladimirovich Andreikin; 5 February 1990 (age 36) Ryazan, Russian SFSR, Soviet Union

Chess career
- Country: Russia (until 2022); FIDE (since 2022)
- Title: Grandmaster (2007)
- FIDE rating: 2714 (September 2026)
- Peak rating: 2743 (June 2016)
- Ranking: No. 27 (September 2026)
- Peak ranking: No. 18 (January 2015)

Dmitry Vladimirovich Andreikin (Russian: Дмитрий Владимирович Андрейкин; born 5 February 1990) is a Russian chess grandmaster, World Junior Chess Champion in 2010 and two-time Russian Chess Champion (2012 and 2018). He won the Tashkent leg of FIDE Grand Prix 2014–15 and finished runners-up in Chess World Cup 2013 and Belgrade leg of FIDE Grand Prix 2022. He is also currently the second-highest rated chess player from Russia, only behind Ian Nepomniachtchi.

== Chess career ==
=== Early career ===
Andreikin won the Under-10 division of the World Youth Chess Championships in 1999.

He tied for 1st–3rd places with Konstantin Chernyshov and Alexei Kornev at Lipetsk 2006. In 2008, he won the 4th Inautomarket Open in Minsk and tied for 3rd–7th with Rauf Mamedov, Denis Yevseev, Vasily Yemelin and Eltaj Safarli in the Chigorin Memorial. In 2009, he tied for 1st–3rd with Yuriy Kuzubov and Rauf Mamedov in the category 16 SPICE Cup A tournament at Lubbock, Texas.

=== 2010–2015 ===
He won the 2010 World Junior Chess Championship in Chotowa, Poland. In the same year, he tied for 2nd–7th with Alexey Dreev, Ivan Sokolov, Vladimir Fedoseev, Alexander Areshchenko and Konstantin Sakaev in the Chigorin Memorial. In 2011, he tied for 2nd–3rd with Emil Sutovsky in the Baku Open. In February 2012, tied for 4th–8th with Alexander Khalifman, Maxim Rodshtein, Fabiano Caruana and Hrant Melkumyan in the 11th Aeroflot Open.

In August 2012, Andreikin won the 65th Russian Chess Championship in Moscow after winning a rapid playoff against five other players.

At the FIDE World Blitz Chess Championship 2012, He finished in fifth place.

In the Tal Memorial played in June 2013, Andreikin was the lowest rated player, but he went through the tournament undefeated with eight draws and a win against Vladimir Kramnik, which gave him a shared third to fifth place.

In the Chess World Cup 2013, held in Norway from 11 August to 2 September, Andreikin finished in second place, losing to Kramnik in the four-game final match 1½–2½. This result qualified him for the Candidates Tournament 2014, where he finished equal 3rd-5th out of 8 players, with a score of 7/14. As of 2023, this is the only time he has qualified for the Candidates.

In October–November 2014 he scored a major success in the second leg of the FIDE Grand Prix in Tashkent, winning the tournament ahead of Hikaru Nakamura, Shakhriyar Mamedyarov, Fabiano Caruana and eight other elite grandmasters. His score of 7/11 gave him a performance rating of 2852. However, his other Grand Prix results were not as good, and he was knocked out of the Chess World Cup 2015 in the round of 16 by eventual winner Sergey Karjakin, so he missed qualification for the 2016 Candidates Tournament.

=== 2016–2019 ===
In 2016, Andreikin won the Hasselbacken Open (on tiebreak from B. Adhiban) in Stockholm, the Abu Dhabi Chess Festival and the European Blitz Chess Championship in Tallinn. In 2017, he won the gold medal in the men's rapid chess event of the IMSA Elite Mind Games in Huai'an, China.

In 2018, Andreikin won the 71st Russian Chess Championship for the second time in his career after beating Dmitry Jakovenko in a rapid playoff.

In 2019, Andreikin won a match against Ding Liren with a (+1-0=3) score.

He was the only player who won against Magnus Carlsen at FIDE World Blitz Chess Championship 2019. He tied for 6th-20th.

=== 2020s ===
Through February and March 2022, Andreikin played in the FIDE Grand Prix 2022. In the second leg, he won his group with a 4/6 result and defeated Anish Giri in the semifinals with a 2.5/4 result in classical and rapid time formats. He was defeated by Richárd Rapport in the finals with a 0.5/2 result. He withdrew from the remainder of the Grand Prix for personal reasons. He finished the tournament fifth in the standings with ten points.

In 2022, Andreikin won 10 Titled Tuesday events held on Chess.com and reached the finals of Chess.com Rapid Chess Championship losing to Ian Nepomniachtchi in the finals after defeating Hikaru Nakamura, Wesley So and Fabiano Caruana. He occasionally streams Titled Arenas and Team Battles held on Lichess on his YouTube Channel with the username "FairChess" to his 13 thousand subscribers.

At the European Club Cup 2024, He won against Gukesh D, the recent Olympiad gold medalist.

In November 2025, he played a match with Zhu Jiner. The classical games were won by Andreikin, 3–1, and he won the rapid chess games 2½–1½.

In May 2026, Andreikin won the 2026 Chess.com King of the Hill Championship, which marked the first time that a "super-GM" won a community chess championship event on the site.

In July 2026, Andreikin finished 2nd at Chennai Grand Masters, ½ points behind winner Alireza Firouzja.

== Notes ==
Preceded by Peter Svidler	Russian Chess Champion; 2012	Succeeded by Peter Svidler
Preceded by Peter Svidler	Russian Chess Champion; 2018	Succeeded by Evgeny Tomashevsky
