= Russian Chess Championship =

The Russian Chess Championship has taken various forms.

== Winners by year (men) ==
=== Imperial Russia ===
In 1874, Emanuel Schiffers defeated Andrey Chardin in a match held in St. Petersburg with five wins and four losses. Schiffers was considered the first Russian champion until his student, Mikhail Chigorin, defeated him in a match held in St. Petersburg in 1879. Chigorin won with seven wins, four losses, and two draws.

In 1899, the format of the championship was changed to a round-robin tournament known as the All-Russian Masters' Tournament. The winners were:

#	Year	City	Winner
1	1899	Moscow	Mikhail Chigorin
2	1900/1901	Moscow	Mikhail Chigorin
3	1903	Kiev	Mikhail Chigorin
4	1905/1906	Saint Petersburg	Gersz Salwe
5	1907	Łódź	Akiba Rubinstein
6	1909	Vilna	Akiba Rubinstein
7	1912	Vilna	Akiba Rubinstein
8	1913/1914	Saint Petersburg	Alexander Alekhine & Aron Nimzowitsch

=== RSFSR ===
After the formation of the USSR the USSR Chess Championship was established as the national championship. However the Russian championship continued to exist as the championship of the RSFSR. The first two USSR championships in 1920 and 1923 were also recognized as RSFSR championships; the modern numbering of Russian championships begins with these two tournaments. The cities Moscow and Leningrad held their own championships and their players were ineligible to play in the RSFSR championship. However, some did participate as outside competitors: for example, Taimanov finished with the same number of points as Tarasov in the 1960 championship, but only Tarasov was awarded the title as Taimanov was from Leningrad.

Rashid Nezhmetdinov held the record of five wins of the Russian Chess Championship.

#	Year	City	Winner
1	1920	Moscow	Alexander Alekhine
2	1923	Petrograd	Peter Romanovsky
3	1928	Moscow	Peter Izmailov
4	1934	Moscow	Sergey Belavenets
5	1935	Gorky	Alexander Tolush
6	1946	Sverdlovsk	Isaac Boleslavsky
7	1947	Kuybyshev	Nikolay Novotelnov
8	1948	Saratov	Nikolay Aratovsky, Georgy Ilivitsky
9	1949	Yaroslavl	Peter Dubinin, Georgy Ilivitsky (2)
10	1950	Gorky	Rashid Nezhmetdinov
11	1951	Yaroslavl	Rashid Nezhmetdinov (2)
12	1952	Tula	Lev Aronin, Nikolai Krogius
13	1953	Saratov	Rashid Nezhmetdinov (3)
14	1954	Rostov-on-Don	Leonid Shamkovich
15	1955	Leningrad	Anatoly Lutikov
16	1956	Kislovodsk	Leonid Shamkovich
17	1957	Krasnodar	Rashid Nezhmetdinov (4)
18	1958	Sochi	Rashid Nezhmetdinov (5)
19	1959	Voronezh	Anatoly Lutikov (2)
20	1960	Perm	Vitaly Tarasov, Mark Taimanov (off contest)
21	1961	Omsk	Lev Polugaevsky
22	1963	Chelyabinsk	Anatoly Lein
23	1964	Kazan	Nikolai Krogius
24	1966	Saratov	Igor Zakharov, Anatoly Lein, Vladimir Sergievsky
25	1968	Grozny	Alexander Zaitsev
26	1970	Kuybyshev	Anatoly Karpov
27	1971	Penza	Oleg Dementiev, Valery Zilberstein
28	1972	Rostov-on-Don	Vitaly Tseshkovsky
29	1973	Omsk	Valeri Korensky, Jurij Rusakov, Vitaly Tseshkovsky (2)
30	1974	Tula	Nukhim Rashkovsky
31	1976	Novosibirsk	Nukhim Rashkovsky (2)
32	1977	Volgograd	Valerij Zhuravliov, Lev Psakhis
33	1979	Sverdlovsk	Alexander Panchenko
34	1980	Kazan	Alexander Petrushin
35	1981	Vladimir	Pavel Zarubin
36	1982	Stavropol	Anatoly Vaisser, Valery Chekhov
37	1984	Bryansk	Gennady Tunik
38	1985	Sverdlovsk	Alexander Petrushin
39	1986	Smolensk	Veniamin Shtyrenkov
40	1987	Kursk	Andrei Kharitonov
41	1988	Voronezh	Ratmir Kholmov, Vadim Ruban
42	1989	Gorky	Alexey Vyzmanavin
43	1990	Kuybyshev	Andrei Kharlov, Vladimir Kramnik, Ruslan Shcherbakov, Maxim Sorokin
44	1991	Smolensk	Sergei Rublevsky

=== Russian Federation ===
After the collapse of the Soviet Union, the Russian Championship was re-established as a national championship, and players from Moscow and St. Petersburg were allowed to participate. Prior to 2004, the championship was organized as a Swiss-style tournament except for 1997 and 1999, where a knockout format was used. In 2004, the tournament reverted to a round robin with the strongest players in the country directly seeded into the final (called the Superfinal) held in Moscow while others progress through qualifying tournaments.

#	Date	City	Tournament system	Winner	Notes	Reference
45	1992	Oryol	Swiss	Alexei Gavrilov		
46	1993	Tyumen	Swiss	Alexei Bezgodov		
47	1994	Elista	Swiss	Peter Svidler		
48	17–29 October 1995	Elista	Swiss	Peter Svidler (2)		
49	14–17 October 1996	Elista	Swiss	Alexander Khalifman		
50	20 May – 6 June 1997	Elista	Knockout	Peter Svidler (3)		
51	27 July – 8 August 1998	Saint Petersburg	Swiss	Alexander Morozevich		
52	15–28 December 1999	Moscow	Knockout	Konstantin Sakaev		
53	17–27 June 2000	Samara	Swiss	Sergey Volkov		
54	29 April – 9 May 2001	Elista	Swiss	Alexander Motylev	on tiebreak over Alexander Lastin	
55	27 August – 4 September 2002	Krasnodar	Swiss	Alexander Lastin		
56	2–12 September 2003	Krasnoyarsk	Swiss	Peter Svidler (4)	on tiebreak over Alexander Morozevich	
57	14–27 November 2004	Moscow	Round-robin	Garry Kasparov		
58	19–30 December 2005	Moscow	Round-robin	Sergei Rublevsky		
59	3–15 December 2006	Moscow	Round-robin	Evgeny Alekseev	after a playoff match with Dmitry Jakovenko	
60	17–30 December 2007	Moscow	Round-robin	Alexander Morozevich (2)		
61	2–16 October 2008	Moscow	Round-robin	Peter Svidler (5)	after a playoff with Evgeny Alekseev and Dmitry Jakovenko	
62	19–30 December 2009	Moscow	Round-robin	Alexander Grischuk		
63	10–22 December 2010	Moscow	Round-robin	Ian Nepomniachtchi	after a playoff with Sergey Karjakin	
64	7–15 August 2011	Moscow	Round-robin	Peter Svidler (6)		
65	2–13 August 2012	Moscow	Round-robin	Dmitry Andreikin	after a rapid playoff with Sergey Karjakin, Peter Svidler, Dmitry Jakovenko, Vladimir Potkin and Evgeny Alekseev	
66	4–15 October 2013	Nizhny Novgorod	Round-robin	Peter Svidler (7)	after a playoff match with Ian Nepomniachtchi	
67	27 November – 8 December 2014	Kazan	Round-robin	Igor Lysyj		
68	8–21 August 2015	Chita	Round-robin	Evgeny Tomashevsky		
69	15–28 October 2016	Novosibirsk	Round-robin	Alexander Riazantsev		
70	2–15 December 2017	Saint Petersburg	Round-robin	Peter Svidler (8)	after a playoff match with Nikita Vitiugov	
71	25 August - 5 September 2018	Satka	Round-robin	Dmitry Andreikin (2)	after a playoff match with Dmitry Jakovenko	
72	10–23 August 2019	Votkinsk – Izhevsk	Round-robin	Evgeny Tomashevsky (2)		
73	5–16 December 2020	Moscow	Round-robin	Ian Nepomniachtchi (2)		
74	9–20 October 2021	Ufa	Round-robin	Nikita Vitiugov		
75	10–23 September 2022	Cheboksary	Round-robin	Daniil Dubov	after an Armageddon match with Sanan Sjugirov	
76	1-12 October 2023	Tsarskoye Selo	Round-robin	Vladislav Artemiev	8½ from 11 (+6 −0 =5)	
77	16-29 August 2024	Barnaul	Round-robin	Vladislav Artemiev (2)	after a playoff match with Andrey Esipenko	
78	1-12 October 2025	Moscow	Round-robin	Arseniy Nesterov	6½ from 11 (+2 −0 =9)	
79	1-12 October 2026	Rostov-on-Don	Round-robin	Andrey Esipenko	7½ from 11 (+4 −0 =7)	

== Winners by year (women) ==
#	Year	City	Winner
1	1934	Moscow	Vera Chudova
2	1935	Gorky	Nina Golubeva
3	1947	Ivanovo	Olga Strelova
4	1948	Kuybyshev	Alexandra Daibo
5	1949	Stavropol	Vera Tikhomirova
6	1950	Rostov-on-Don	Vera Tikhomirova
7	1951	Ivanovo	Tema Filanovskaya
8	1952	Saratov	Vera Tikhomirova
9	1953	Sochi	Vera Tikhomirova
10	1954	Gorky	Tema Filanovskaya
11	1955	Taganrog	Tema Filanovskaya, Polishchuk
12	1956	Tuapse	Valentina Borisenko
13	1957	Kaluga	Valentina Borisenko
14	1958	Saratov	Valentina Borisenko
15	1959	Yaroslavl	Klara Skegina
16	1960	Sochi	Valentina Borisenko
17	1961	Sverdlovsk	Klara Skegina
18	1963	Tula	Klara Skegina
19	1964	Dubna	Natalia Konopleva
20	1966	Krasnodar	Rimma Bilunova
21	1968	Nalchik	Rimma Bilunova
22	1970	Kostroma	Vera Ushakova (Timoshchenko)
23	1971	Krasnodar	Ludmila Lyubarskaya
24	1972	Volgograd	Ludmila Saunina
25	1973	Arkhangelsk	L. Vericheva
26	1974	Nalchik	Alexsandra Kislova
27	1975	Chelyabinsk	Alexsandra Kislova
28	1976	Penza	Valentina Kozlovskaya
29	1977	Kaliningrad	Natalia Alekhina
30	1979	Kaluga	Valentina Kozlovskaya, Ludmila Saunina
31	1980	Voronezh	Elena Akhmilovskaya
32	1981	Sverdlovsk	Nadezhda Putjatina
33	1982	Ordzhonikidze	Natalia Alekhina
34	1984	Kaliningrad	Larisa Polnareva
35	1985	Lipetsk	Ludmila Saunina
36	1986	Saratov	Alla Grinfeld, Ludmila Saunina
37	1987	Sverdlovsk	Tatiana Stepovaia
38	1988	Sverdlovsk	Tatiana Stepovaia
39	1989	Sverdlovsk	Tatiana Stepovaia
40	1990	Podolsk	Ketevan Arakhamia-Grant
41	1991	Lvov	Svetlana Matveeva
42	1992	?	Svetlana Prudnikova
43	1993	Lipetsk	Ludmila Zaitseva
44	1994	Elista	Ekaterina Kovalevskaya
45	1995	Elista	Julia Demina
46	1996	Elista	Ludmila Zaitseva
47	1997	Elista	Alisa Galliamova
48	1998	Elista	Svetlana Prudnikova
49	1999	Moscow	Julia Demina
50	2000	Elista	Ekaterina Kovalevskaya
51	2001	Elista	Olga Zimina
52	2002	Elista	Tatiana Kosintseva
53	2003	Elista	Irina Slavina Turova
54	2004	Kazan	Tatiana Kosintseva
55	2005	Samara	Alexandra Kosteniuk
56	2006	Gorodets	Ekaterina Korbut
57	2007	Moscow	Tatiana Kosintseva
58	2008	Moscow	Nadezhda Kosintseva
59	2009	Moscow	Alisa Galliamova
60	2010	Moscow	Alisa Galliamova
61	2011	Moscow	Valentina Gunina
62	2012	Moscow	Natalia Pogonina
63	2013	Nizhny Novgorod	Valentina Gunina
64	2014	Kazan	Valentina Gunina
65	2015	Chita	Aleksandra Goryachkina
66	2016	Novosibirsk	Alexandra Kosteniuk
67	2017	Saint Petersburg	Aleksandra Goryachkina
68	2018	Satka	Natalia Pogonina
69	2019	Votkinsk – Izhevsk	Olga Girya
70	2020	Moscow	Aleksandra Goryachkina
71	2021	Ufa	Valentina Gunina
72	2022	Cheboksary	Valentina Gunina
73	2023	Saint Petersburg	Baira Kovanova
74	2024	Barnaul	Kateryna Lagno
75	2025	Moscow	Anna Shukhman
76	2026	Rostov-on-Don	Leya Garifullina

== Events by year ==
=== 1997 ===
==== Men ====
1st Round
GM Evgeny Bareev (2665)
bye
GM Andrei Y. Kharitonov (2520)	1½
GM Mikhail Kobalia (2545)	½
GM Vadim Ruban (2545)	½
Alexander Kozak	1½
IM Alexander Potapov (2455)	1
GM Sergey Dolmatov (2560)	3
GM Alexander Morozevich (2595)
bye
bye
GM Oleg Korneev (2590)
GM Alexander Fominyh (2545)	1½
IM Oleg Maiorov (2435)	½
bye
GM Vladimir Epishin (2600)
GM Sergei Tiviakov (2600)
bye
IM Valeri Yandemirov (2500)	½
GM Ildar Ibragimov (2555)	1½
GM Andrei Kharlov (2555)	1½
IM Evgeniy Najer (2510)	½
IM Maksim Notkin (2515)	2½
GM Yuri Yakovich (2575)	3½
GM Konstantin Sakaev (2580)	½
IM Alexander Lastin (2535)	1½
GM Konstantin Aseev (2530)	3
GM Evgeny Pigusov (2565)	1
IM Alexei Bezgodov (2570)	1½
GM Sergey Ivanov (2515)	2½
bye
GM Sergei Rublevsky (2645)
GM Alexander Khalifman (2650)
bye
bye
GM Alexander Goldin (2590)
GM Evgeny Sveshnikov (2560)	2½
GM Yuri Balashov (2510)	2½
bye
GM Semen Dvoirys (2590)
GM Ruslan Shcherbakov (2580)	3
Baatr Shovunov (2340)	1
GM Alexander Vaulin (2490)	3
GM Sergey Smagin (2575)	1
GM Konstantin Landa (2570)	2½
IM Vladimir Malakhov (2540)	3½
bye
GM Peter Svidler (2640)
GM Vadim Zvjaginsev (2610)
bye
GM Vladimir Burmakin (2530)	3
GM Sergei Shipov (2540)	1
GM Valery Loginov (2555)	½
IM Aleksandr Galkin (2510)	1½
GM Valerij Filippov (2510)	1½
GM Alexey Vyzmanavin (2585)	½
GM Mikhail Ulibin (2555)	2
IM Orest N. Averkin (2425)	0
IM Aleksei Lugovoi (2510)	2½
GM Marat Makarov (2545)	3½
IM Alexander Rustemov (2550)	2½
IM Petr Kiriakov (2530)	3½
bye
GM Alexey Dreev (2650)

2nd Round
GM Evgeny Bareev (2665)	2½
GM Andrei Y. Kharitonov (2520)	1½
Alexander Kozak	½
GM Sergey Dolmatov (2560)	1½
GM Alexander Morozevich (2595)	2½
GM Oleg Korneev (2590)	1½
GM Alexander Fominyh (2545)	2½
GM Vladimir Epishin (2600)	1½
GM Sergei Tiviakov (2600)	3½
GM Ildar Ibragimov (2555)	2½
GM Andrei Kharlov (2555)	½
GM Yuri Yakovich (2575)	1½
IM Alexander Lastin (2535)	3
GM Konstantin Aseev (2530)	1
GM Sergey Ivanov (2515)	3½
GM Sergei Rublevsky (2645)	4½
GM Alexander Khalifman (2650)	1½
GM Alexander Goldin (2590)	½
GM Yuri Balashov (2510)	½
GM Semen Dvoirys (2590)	1½
GM Ruslan Shcherbakov (2580)	1½
GM Alexander Vaulin (2490)	½
IM Vladimir Malakhov (2540)	1½
GM Peter Svidler (2640)	2½
GM Vadim Zvjaginsev (2610)	3
GM Vladimir Burmakin (2530)	1
IM Aleksandr Galkin (2510)	½
GM Valerij Filippov (2510)	1½
GM Mikhail Ulibin (2555)	1½
GM Marat Makarov (2545)	2½
IM Petr Kiriakov (2530)	½
GM Alexey Dreev (2650)	1½

3rd Round
GM Evgeny Bareev (2665)	3
GM Sergey Dolmatov (2560)	1
GM Alexander Morozevich (2595)	2
GM Alexander Fominyh (2545)	0
GM Sergei Tiviakov (2600)	1½
GM Yuri Yakovich (2575)	2½
IM Alexander Lastin (2535)	1½
GM Sergei Rublevsky (2645)	½
GM Alexander Khalifman (2650)	½
GM Semen Dvoirys (2590)	1½
GM Ruslan Shcherbakov (2580)	0
GM Peter Svidler (2640)	2
GM Vadim Zvjaginsev (2610)	1½
GM Valerij Filippov (2510)	½
GM Marat Makarov (2545)	1½
GM Alexey Dreev (2650)	2½

Quarterfinals
GM Evgeny Bareev (2665)	1½
GM Alexander Morozevich (2595)	½
GM Yuri Yakovich (2575)	½
IM Alexander Lastin (2535)	1½
GM Semen Dvoirys (2590)	0
GM Peter Svidler (2640)	2
GM Vadim Zvjaginsev (2610)	2½
GM Alexey Dreev (2650)	3½

Semifinals
GM Evgeny Bareev (2665)	1½
IM Alexander Lastin (2535)	½
Finals
GM Evgeny Bareev (2665)	3
GM Peter Svidler (2640)	5
GM Peter Svidler (2640)	3
GM Alexey Dreev (2650)	1

Third place match: GM Alexey Dreev (2650) 1½:½ IM Alexander Lastin (2535)

=== 1999 ===
==== Men ====
1st Round
GM Konstantin Sakaev (2648) (Saint Petersburg)
bye
IM Alexander Cherniaev (2432) (Arkhangelsk Oblast)	½
GM Yuri Balashov (2534) (Moscow)	1½
GM Alexander Fominyh (2552) (Novosibirsk Oblast)	2
IM Alexander Gelman (2469) (Moscow)	0
IM Alexey Korotylev (2480) (Moscow)	2
GM Nikolai Pushkov (2553) (Rostov Oblast)	0
GM Vladimir Malakhov (2570) (Moscow Oblast)	½
GM Andrei Shchekachev (2505) (Moscow)	1½
GM Sergey Janovsky (2498) (Moscow)	½
GM Aleksandr Poluljahov (2554) (Krasnodar Krai)	1½
GM Ildar Ibragimov (2554) (Tatarstan)	2
Evgeny Sapunov (2498) (Tambov Oblast)	0
GM Sergei Beshukov (2506) (Krasnodar Krai)	+
GM Alexander Rustemov (2573) (Moscow)	-
GM Vladimir Burmakin (2579) (Murmansk Oblast)
bye
Sergey Okrugin (2390) (Yaroslavl Oblast)	0
IM Valerij Popov (2523) (Saint Petersburg)	2
GM Mikhail Kobalia (2573) (Moscow)	1½
IM Roman Ovetchkin (2505) (Sverdlovsk Oblast)	½
GM Aleksei Lugovoi (2509) (Saint Petersburg)	2½
GM Sergey Volkov (2575) (Mordovia)	1½
GM Evgeny Sveshnikov (2541) (Chelyabinsk Oblast)	1½
GM Ratmir Kholmov (2464) (Moscow)	½
FM Artiom Akhmetov (2438) (Bashkortostan)	2½
GM Igor Berdichevski (2538) (Moscow)	1½
IM Maxim Turov (2529) (Rostov Oblast)	1½
FM Alexander Riazantsev (2417) (Moscow)	½
bye
GM Valery Filippov (2605) (Kemerovo Oblast)
GM Semen Dvoirys (2590) (Chelyabinsk Oblast)
bye
FM Ilya Korobov (2392) (Nizhny Novgorod Oblast)	1½
GM Marat Makarov (2590) (Tatarstan)	2½
IM Alexei Iljushin (2527) (Saratov Oblast)	½
Sergey Grigoriants (2413) (Moscow)	1½
IM Evgeny Vorobiov (2459) (Moscow)	1
GM Ruslan Shcherbakov (2541) (Chelyabinsk Oblast)	3
IM Denis Yevseev (2478) (Murmansk Oblast)	2
IM Vladislav Vorotnikov (2455) (Moscow)	0
FM Dmitry Kokarev (2370) (Penza Oblast)	3
IM Igor Zakharevich (2523) (Novgorod Oblast)	1
GM Alexander Lastin (2552) (Moscow)	1½
FM Vladimir Potkin (2478) (Moscow)	½
FM Evgeny Shaposhnikov (2494) (Saint Petersburg)	2½
GM Sergey Ionov (2553) (Saint Petersburg)	1½
GM Pavel Tregubov (2609) (Krasnodar Krai)
bye
GM Igor Zaitsev (2420) (Moscow)	½
GM Valery Loginov (2530) (Saint Petersburg)	1½
IM Leonid Totsky (2521) (Sverdlovsk Oblast)	3
Alexei Gubajdullin (2327) (Tatarstan)	1
IM Sergey Kalugin (2511) (Oryol Oblast)	1
IM Alexei Bezgodov (2576) (Perm Krai)	3
IM Alexander Grischuk (2549) (Moscow)	1½
IM Sergey Solovjov (2467) (Saint Petersburg)	½
FM Andrey Lunev (2467) (Oryol Oblast)	1½
IM Stanislav Voitsekhovsky (2544) (Nizhny Novgorod Oblast)	½
GM Konstantin Aseev (2533) (Saint Petersburg)	2
Vladislav Akselrod (2432) (Novosibirsk Oblast)	0
bye
GM Andrei Kharlov (2615) (Tatarstan)

2nd Round
GM Konstantin Sakaev (2648) (Saint Petersburg)	1½
GM Yuri Balashov (2534) (Moscow)	½
GM Alexander Fominyh (2552) (Novosibirsk Oblast)	2
IM Alexey Korotylev (2480) (Moscow)	0
GM Andrei Shchekachev (2505) (Moscow)	3
GM Aleksandr Poluljahov (2554) (Krasnodar Krai)	1
GM Ildar Ibragimov (2554) (Tatarstan)	2½
GM Sergei Beshukov (2506) (Krasnodar Krai)	1½
GM Vladimir Burmakin (2579) (Murmansk Oblast)	½
IM Valerij Popov (2523) (Saint Petersburg)	1½
GM Mikhail Kobalia (2573) (Moscow)	1½
GM Aleksei Lugovoi (2509) (Saint Petersburg)	½
GM Evgeny Sveshnikov (2541) (Chelyabinsk Oblast)	3
FM Artiom Akhmetov (2438) (Bashkortostan)	1
IM Maxim Turov (2529) (Rostov Oblast)	1
GM Valery Filippov (2605) (Kemerovo Oblast)	3
GM Semen Dvoirys (2590) (Chelyabinsk Oblast)	1½
GM Marat Makarov (2590) (Tatarstan)	½
Sergey Grigoriants (2413) (Moscow)	1
GM Ruslan Shcherbakov (2541) (Chelyabinsk Oblast)	3
IM Denis Yevseev (2478) (Murmansk Oblast)	1
FM Dmitry Kokarev (2370) (Penza Oblast)	3
GM Alexander Lastin (2552) (Moscow)	2½
FM Evgeny Shaposhnikov (2494) (Saint Petersburg)	1½
GM Pavel Tregubov (2609) (Krasnodar Krai)	1
GM Valery Loginov (2530) (Saint Petersburg)	3
IM Leonid Totsky (2521) (Sverdlovsk Oblast)	½
IM Alexei Bezgodov (2576) (Perm Krai)	1½
IM Alexander Grischuk (2549) (Moscow)	1½
FM Andrey Lunev (2467) (Oryol Oblast)	½
GM Konstantin Aseev (2533) (Saint Petersburg)	½
GM Andrei Kharlov (2615) (Tatarstan)	1½

3rd Round
GM Konstantin Sakaev (2648) (Saint Petersburg)	1½
GM Alexander Fominyh (2552) (Novosibirsk Oblast)	½
GM Andrei Shchekachev (2505) (Moscow)	1½
GM Ildar Ibragimov (2554) (Tatarstan)	2½
IM Valerij Popov (2523) (Saint Petersburg)	½
GM Mikhail Kobalia (2573) (Moscow)	1½
GM Evgeny Sveshnikov (2541) (Chelyabinsk Oblast)	3
GM Valery Filippov (2605) (Kemerovo Oblast)	2
GM Semen Dvoirys (2590) (Chelyabinsk Oblast)	2½
GM Ruslan Shcherbakov (2541) (Chelyabinsk Oblast)	1½
FM Dmitry Kokarev (2370) (Penza Oblast)	½
GM Alexander Lastin (2552) (Moscow)	1½
GM Valery Loginov (2530) (Saint Petersburg)	½
IM Alexei Bezgodov (2576) (Perm Krai)	1½
IM Alexander Grischuk (2549) (Moscow)	3
GM Andrei Kharlov (2615) (Tatarstan)	1

Quarterfinals
GM Konstantin Sakaev (2648) (Saint Petersburg)	2½
GM Ildar Ibragimov (2554) (Tatarstan)	1½
GM Evgeny Sveshnikov (2541) (Chelyabinsk Oblast)	½
GM Mikhail Kobalia (2573) (Moscow)	1½
GM Semen Dvoirys (2590) (Chelyabinsk Oblast)	0
GM Alexander Lastin (2552) (Moscow)	2
IM Alexei Bezgodov (2576) (Perm Krai)	1½
IM Alexander Grischuk (2549) (Moscow)	½

Semifinals
GM Konstantin Sakaev (2648) (Saint Petersburg)	1½
GM Mikhail Kobalia (2573) (Moscow)	½
Finals
GM Konstantin Sakaev (2648) (Saint Petersburg)	3
IM Alexei Bezgodov (2576) (Perm Krai)	1
GM Alexander Lastin (2552) (Moscow)	2
IM Alexei Bezgodov (2576) (Perm Krai)	3

=== 2004 ===
==== Men ====
57th Russian Championship Superfinal, 15–27 November 2004, Moscow, Category XVIII (2678)
	Player	Rating	1	2	3	4	5	6	7	8	9	10	11	Total	TPR	Place
1	Garry Kasparov (Russia)	2813		½	1	½	½	1	1	½	½	1	1	7½	2857	1
2	Alexander Grischuk (Russia)	2704	½		½	½	1	½	1	½	0	½	1	6	2747	2
3	Alexey Dreev (Russia)	2698	0	½		1	½	0	½	½	1	½	1	5½	2712	3
4	Alexander Morozevich (Russia)	2758	½	½	0		1	½	½	½	1	½	0	5	2670	4–7
5	Alexander Motylev (Russia)	2651	½	0	½	0		1	½	1	0	½	1	5	2681	4–7
6	Peter Svidler (Russia)	2735	0	½	1	½	0		½	½	1	0	1	5	2672	4–7
7	Evgeny Bareev (Russia)	2715	0	0	½	½	½	½		½	1	½	1	5	2674	4–7
8	Vladimir Epishin (Russia)	2599	½	½	½	½	0	½	½		½	½	½	4½	2650	8–10
9	Alexey Korotylev (Russia)	2596	½	1	0	0	1	0	0	½		1	½	4½	2650	8–10
10	Artyom Timofeev (Russia)	2611	0	½	½	½	½	1	½	½	0		½	4½	2649	8–10
11	Vitaly Tseshkovsky (Russia)	2577	0	0	0	1	0	0	0	½	½	½		2½	2495	11

==== Women ====
54th Russian Women's Championship Superfinal, 29 June – 10 July 2004, Kazan, Category VII (2420)
	Player	Rating	1	2	3	4	5	6	7	8	9	10	11	12	Total	TPR	Place
1	WGM Tatiana Kosintseva (Russia)	2451		1	½	½	1	½	½	½	1	1	1	1	8½	2628	1
2	IM Alexandra Kosteniuk (Russia)	2469	0		½	½	1	1	½	1	1	1	½	1	8	2590	2
3	WGM Nadezhda Kosintseva (Russia)	2425	½	½		½	1	1	0	0	0	1	1	1	6½	2484	3
4	WGM Ekaterina Kovalevskaya (Russia)	2467	½	½	½		½	0	½	1	½	1	½	½	6	2451	4–5
5	IM Alisa Galliamova (Russia)	2502	0	0	0	½		1	1	1	½	½	½	1	6	2448	4–5
6	WGM Elena Zaiatz (Russia)	2344	½	0	0	1	0		½	½	1	½	1	½	5½	2426	6
7	WGM Tatiana Shadrina (Russia)	2380	½	½	1	½	0	½		0	1	0	½	½	5	2387	7–8
8	IM Irina Slavina (Russia)	2395	½	0	1	0	0	½	1		½	½	1	0	5	2386	7–8
9	WGM Ekaterina Polovnikova (Russia)	2406	0	0	1	½	½	0	0	½		½	1	½	4½	2356	9
10	WGM Tatiana Shumiakina (Russia)	2337	0	0	0	0	½	½	1	½	½		½	½	4	2325	10
11	WGM Svetlana Matveeva (Russia)	2496	0	½	0	½	½	0	½	0	0	½		1	3½	2280	11–12
12	WGM Tatiana Stepovaya (Russia)	2362	0	0	0	½	0	½	½	1	½	½	0		3½	2292	11–12

=== 2005 ===
==== Men ====
58th Russian Championship Superfinal, 19–30 December 2005, Moscow, Category XVII (2664)
	Player	Rating	1	2	3	4	5	6	7	8	9	10	11	12	Total	TPR	Place
1	Sergei Rublevsky (Russia)	2652		1	½	1	½	½	½	1	1	½	½	½	7½	2799	1
2	Dmitry Jakovenko (Russia)	2644	0		1	½	½	½	½	1	½	½	1	½	6½	2731	2–3
3	Alexander Morozevich (Russia)	2707	½	0		0	½	½	½	1	1	1	½	1	6½	2726	2–3
4	Evgeny Bareev (Russia)	2675	0	½	1		½	1	1	0	0	½	½	1	6	2699	4–6
5	Vadim Zvjaginsev (Russia)	2659	½	½	½	½		½	½	½	½	1	0	1	6	2701	4–6
6	Peter Svidler (Russia)	2740	½	½	½	0	½		1	½	½	½	1	½	6	2694	4–6
7	Vladimir Kramnik (Russia)	2739	½	½	½	0	½	0		½	½	½	1	1	5½	2658	7
8	Alexander Motylev (Russia)	2632	0	0	0	1	½	½	½		½	½	½	1	5	2631	8
9	Alexey Dreev (Russia)	2694	0	½	0	1	½	½	½	½		½	½	0	4½	2597	9–10
10	Alexander Khalifman (Russia)	2653	½	½	0	½	0	½	½	½	½		½	½	4½	2600	9–10
11	Evgeny Tomashevsky (Russia)	2564	½	0	½	½	1	0	0	½	½	½		0	4	2572	11–12
12	Sergey Volkov (Russia)	2614	½	½	0	0	0	½	0	0	1	½	1		4	2567	11–12

==== Women ====
55th Russian Women's Championship Superfinal, 14–26 May 2005, Samara, Category VI (2389)
	Player	Rating	1	2	3	4	5	6	7	8	9	10	11	12	Total	TPR	Place
1	GM Alexandra Kosteniuk (Russia)	2492		1	½	1	½	1	1	½	1	1	1	½	9	2642	1
2	IM Tatiana Kosintseva (Russia)	2486	0		1	½	½	1	1	½	½	1	1	1	8	2555	2
3	IM Ekaterina Kovalevskaya (Russia)	2469	½	0		1	1	½	½	½	1	½	1	1	7½	2515	3
4	IM Nadezhda Kosintseva (Russia)	2459	0	½	0		1	½	1	1	1	0	½	1	6½	2448	4
5	IM Alisa Galliamova (Russia)	2469	½	½	0	0		½	0	½	1	1	1	1	6	2418	5
6	WGM Natalia Pogonina (Russia)	2355	0	0	½	½	½		1	½	½	½	½	1	5½	2392	6–7
7	WGM Svetlana Matveeva (Russia)	2423	0	0	½	0	1	0		1	½	1	½	1	5½	2386	6–7
8	WGM Elena Zaiatz (Russia)	2398	½	½	½	0	½	½	0		½	½	½	1	5	2352	8
9	WFM Valentina Gunina (Russia)	2340	0	½	0	0	0	½	½	½		1	½	1	4½	2329	9
10	WGM Ekaterina Korbut (Russia)	2399	0	0	½	1	0	½	0	½	0		0	1	3½	2255	10–11
11	WIM Julia Kochetkova (Russia)	2311	0	0	0	½	0	½	½	½	½	1		0	3½	2263	10–11
12	WFM Yuliya Yakovich (Russia)	2068	½	0	0	0	0	0	0	0	0	0	1		1½	2109	12

=== 2006 ===
==== Men ====
59th Russian Championship Superfinal, 3–15 December 2006, Moscow, Category XV (2622)
	Player	Rating	1	2	3	4	5	6	7	8	9	10	11	12	Total	TB	TPR	Place
1	Evgeny Alekseev (Russia)	2639		½	½	½	0	½	1	1	½	1	1	1	7½	1½	2754	1
2	Dmitry Jakovenko (Russia)	2671	½		1	½	½	0	1	½	1	½	1	1	7½	½	2751	2
3	Ernesto Inarkiev (Russia)	2628	½	0		½	½	1	0	½	1	1	1	1	7		2724	3
4	Peter Svidler (Russia)	2750	½	½	½		½	½	½	½	1	1	½	½	6½		2676	4
5	Sergei Rublevsky (Russia)	2688	1	½	½	½		½	½	½	0	½	½	½	5½		2616	5–7
6	IM Ildar Khairullin (Russia)	2543	½	1	0	½	½		½	½	1	0	½	½	5½		2630	5–7
7	Evgeny Tomashevsky (Russia)	2595	0	0	1	½	½	½		1	½	½	½	½	5½		2625	5–7
8	Sergey Grigoriants (Russia)	2582	0	½	½	½	½	½	0		½	½	½	1	5		2590	8–10
9	IM Ian Nepomniachtchi (Russia)	2545	½	0	0	0	1	0	½	½		1	½	1	5		2593	8–10
10	Denis Khismatullin (Russia)	2583	0	½	0	0	½	1	½	½	0		1	1	5		2590	8–10
11	IM Nikita Vitiugov (Russia)	2596	0	0	0	½	½	½	½	½	½	0		½	3½		2492	11
12	Evgeniy Najer (Russia)	2648	0	0	0	½	½	½	½	0	0	0	½		2½		2409	12

===== First-place tiebreak =====
Player	Rating	Rapid chess		Place
Evgeny Alekseev (Russia)	2639	½	1	1
Dmitry Jakovenko (Russia)	2671	½	0	2

==== Women ====
56th Russian Women's Championship Superfinal, 1–12 December 2006, Gorodets, Category VII (2407)
	Player	Rating	1	2	3	4	5	6	7	8	9	10	11	12	Total	SB	TPR
1	WGM Ekaterina Korbut (Russia)	2435		0	1	1	½	1	½	0	1	1	1	1	8		2579
2	WGM Elena Tairova (Russia)	2415	1		½	½	½	½	0	1	1	1	1	½	7½	37.50	2539
3	IM Tatiana Kosintseva (Russia)	2458	0	½		½	½	1	1	1	1	1	0	1	7½	37.00	2535
4	IM Nadezhda Kosintseva (Russia)	2493	0	½	½		0	1	1	1	½	1	1	1	7½	34.25	2532
5	IM Ekaterina Kovalevskaya (Russia)	2434	½	½	½	1		0	½	1	½	½	1	1	7		2507
6	IM Alisa Galliamova (Russia)	2470	0	½	0	0	1		½	1	½	1	1	1	6½		2466
7	WGM Tatiana Shadrina (Russia)	2396	½	1	0	0	½	½		0	½	1	½	1	5½		2408
8	IM Elena Zaiatz (Russia)	2395	1	0	0	0	0	0	1		1	0	1	½	4½		2343
9	IM Svetlana Matveeva (Russia)	2415	0	0	0	½	½	½	½	0		1	0	½	3½	18.00	2273
10	Anastasia Bodnaruk (Russia)	2255	0	0	0	0	½	0	0	1	0		1	1	3½	13.00	2288
11	WFM Valentina Gunina (Russia)	2392	0	0	1	0	0	0	½	0	1	0		0	2½	13.75	2197
12	WIM Maria Komiagina (Russia)	2326	0	½	0	0	0	0	0	½	½	0	1		2½	10.25	2203

=== 2007 ===
==== Men ====
60th Russian Championship Superfinal, 18–30 December 2007, Moscow, Category XVII (2656)
	Player	Rating	1	2	3	4	5	6	7	8	9	10	11	12	Total	SB	H2H	TPR
1	Alexander Morozevich (Russia)	2755		1	1	0	1	0	1	½	1	½	1	1	8			2822
2	Alexander Grischuk (Russia)	2715	0		1	½	½	½	½	½	½	1	1	1	7			2752
3	Evgeny Tomashevsky (Russia)	2646	0	0		½	0	1	1	½	1	1	½	1	6½			2722
4	Alexey Dreev (Russia)	2607	1	½	½		1	½	0	1	0	0	½	½	5½	32.25		2660
5	Ernesto Inarkiev (Russia)	2674	0	½	1	0		1	½	½	½	½	½	½	5½	29.50	1	2654
6	Nikita Vitiugov (Russia)	2594	1	½	0	½	0		½	½	0	½	1	1	5½	29.50	0	2661
7	Konstantin Sakaev (Russia)	2634	0	½	0	1	½	½		1	½	1	½	0	5½	29.00		2658
8	Dmitry Jakovenko (Russia)	2710	½	½	½	0	½	½	0		½	1	½	1	5½	28.75		2651
9	Peter Svidler (Russia)	2732	0	½	0	1	½	1	½	½		½	0	½	5			2613
10	Farrukh Amonatov (Tajikistan)	2637	½	0	0	1	½	½	0	0	½		½	1	4½			2592
11	Andrey Rychagov (Russia)	2528	0	0	½	½	½	0	½	½	1	½		0	4			2565
12	Artyom Timofeev (Russia)	2637	0	0	0	½	½	0	1	0	½	0	1		3½			2524

==== Women ====
57th Russian Women's Championship Superfinal, 18–30 December 2007, Moscow, Category VII (2413)
	Player	Rating	1	2	3	4	5	6	7	8	9	10	11	12	Total	SB	TPR
1	IM Tatiana Kosintseva (Russia)	2469		1	½	½	1	½	½	1	0	1	1	0	7	38.75	2510
2	WGM Elena Tairova (Russia)	2391	0		1	½	1	1	½	1	0	1	0	1	7	37.25	2517
3	IM Evgenija Ovod (Russia)	2386	½	0		1	½	½	½	1	½	1	½	1	7	35.50	2517
4	IM Ekaterina Korbut (Russia)	2443	½	½	0		0	½	½	1	1	1	1	1	7	33.25	2512
5	WGM Natalia Pogonina (Russia)	2462	0	0	½	1		½	1	½	½	1	1	0	6	31.75	2444
6	IM Nadezhda Kosintseva (Russia)	2469	½	0	½	½	½		0	½	½	1	1	1	6	28.75	2444
7	IM Svetlana Matveeva (Russia)	2434	½	½	½	½	0	1		0	1	0	½	1	5½	29.25	2411
8	WGM Tatiana Shadrina (Russia)	2379	0	0	0	0	½	½	1		1	½	1	1	5½	24.50	2416
9	WGM Tatiana Stepovaya (Russia)	2375	1	1	½	0	½	½	0	0		½	0	1	5		2380
10	WFM Olga Girya (Russia)	2338	0	0	0	0	0	0	1	½	½		1	1	4		2318
11	IM Ekaterina Kovalevskaya (Russia)	2448	0	1	½	0	0	0	½	0	1	0		½	3½		2277
12	WFM Valentina Gunina (Russia)	2359	1	0	0	0	1	0	0	0	0	0	½		2½		2207

=== 2008 ===
==== Men ====
61st Russian Championship Superfinal, 3–15 October 2008, Moscow, Category XVII (2673)
	Player	Rating	1	2	3	4	5	6	7	8	9	10	11	12	Total	TB	TPR	Place
1	Peter Svidler (Russia)	2727		½	1	1	½	½	0	½	1	½	1	½	7	3	2770	1
2	Dmitry Jakovenko (Russia)	2737	½		1	0	½	1	½	1	½	1	½	½	7	2½	2770	2
3	Evgeny Alekseev (Russia)	2715	0	0		½	½	½	1	½	1	1	1	1	7	½	2772	3
4	Alexander Morozevich (Russia)	2787	0	1	½		0	½	½	½	½	1	1	1	6½		2728	4–6
5	Evgeny Tomashevsky (Russia)	2646	½	½	½	1		½	1	0	½	½	1	½	6½		2741	4–6
6	Nikita Vitiugov (Russia)	2638	½	0	½	½	½		1	1	1	½	½	½	6½		2742	4–6
7	Artyom Timofeev (Russia)	2670	1	½	0	½	0	0		½	1	½	1	1	6		2710	7
8	Alexander Lastin (Russia)	2651	½	0	½	½	1	0	½		0	½	½	1	5		2639	8
9	Ernesto Inarkiev (Russia)	2669	0	½	0	½	½	0	0	1		½	½	½	4		2572	9–10
10	Konstantin Sakaev (Russia)	2640	½	0	0	0	½	½	½	½	½		½	½	4		2574	9–10
11	Alexander Riazantsev (Russia)	2656	0	½	0	0	0	½	0	½	½	½		1	3½		2542	11
12	Konstantin Maslak (Russia)	2544	½	½	0	0	½	½	0	0	½	½	0		3		2510	12

===== Rapid playoff =====
Rapid chess tiebreak, 28 October 2008, Moscow
	Player	Rating	1	2	3	Total
1	Peter Svidler (Russia)	2727		½ 1	1 ½	3
2	Dmitry Jakovenko (Russia)	2737	½ 0		1 1	2½
3	Evgeny Alekseev (Russia)	2715	0 ½	0 0		½

==== Women ====
58th Russian Women's Championship Superfinal, 4–14 December 2008, Moscow, Category VIII (2432)
	Player	Rating	1	2	3	4	5	6	7	8	9	10	Total	TPR
1	IM Nadezhda Kosintseva (Russia)	2468		½	½	½	1	0	1	1	1	1	6½	2594
2	IM Tatiana Kosintseva (Russia)	2513	½		½	1	0	1	1	½	0	1	5½	2503
3	WFM Anastasia Bodnaruk (Russia)	2381	½	½		½	½	1	½	½	½	1	5½	2517
4	WGM Marina Romanko (Russia)	2398	½	0	½		0	1	1	½	1	0	4½	2436
5	WGM Tatiana Shadrina (Russia)	2429	0	1	½	1		0	0	½	½	1	4½	2432
6	IM Ekaterina Korbut (Russia)	2459	1	0	0	0	1		½	0	½	1	4	2386
7	WGM Natalia Pogonina (Russia)	2474	0	0	½	0	1	½		1	1	0	4	2384
8	WFM Valentina Gunina (Russia)	2381	0	½	½	½	½	1	0		½	½	4	2394
9	IM Evgenija Ovod (Russia)	2429	0	1	½	0	½	½	0	½		1	4	2389
10	WGM Tatiana Stepovaya (Russia)	2386	0	0	0	1	0	0	1	½	0		2½	2271

=== 2009 ===
==== Men ====
62nd Russian Championship Superfinal, 19–30 December 2009, Moscow, Cat. XVIII (2691)
	Player	Rating	1	2	3	4	5	6	7	8	9	10	Total	TPR
1	Alexander Grischuk (Russia)	2736		½	½	½	1	½	1	1	½	1	6½	2852
2	Peter Svidler (Russia)	2754	½		½	½	½	1	1	1	1	0	6	2809
3	Nikita Vitiugov (Russia)	2694	½	½		½	1	1	0	½	1	0	5	2734
4	Evgeny Alekseev (Russia)	2715	½	½	½		0	½	1	½	½	½	4½	2688
5	Dmitry Jakovenko (Russia)	2736	0	½	0	1		½	½	½	½	1	4½	2686
6	Denis Khismatullin (Russia)	2643	½	0	0	½	½		1	½	0	1	4	2653
7	Alexander Riazantsev (Russia)	2661	0	0	1	0	½	0		½	1	1	4	2651
8	Evgeny Tomashevsky (Russia)	2708	0	0	½	½	½	½	½		½	1	4	2646
9	Artyom Timofeev (Russia)	2651	½	0	0	½	½	1	0	½		½	3½	2615
10	Sanan Sjugirov (Russia)	2612	0	1	1	½	0	0	0	0	½		3	2575

==== Women ====
59th Russian Women's Championship Superfinal, 19–30 December 2009, Moscow, Cat. VIII (2439)
	Player	Rating	1	2	3	4	5	6	7	8	9	10	Total	TPR
1	IM Alisa Galliamova (Russia)	2460i		½	½	½	1	1	1	1	1	1	7½	2709
2	IM Nadezhda Kosintseva (Russia)	2518	½		1	½	1	1	½	1	½	1	7	2650
3	WFM Valentina Gunina (Russia)	2446	½	0		½	0	1	1	1	1	1	6	2563
4	GM Tatiana Kosintseva (Russia)	2522	½	½	½		1	0	1	1	½	½	5½	2509
5	IM Elena Zaiatz (Russia)	2390	0	0	1	0		½	+	1	1	0	4½	2394
6	WGM Anastasia Bodnaruk (Russia)	2372	0	0	0	1	½		0	1	1	1	4½	2446
7	WGM Natalia Pogonina (Russia)	2501	0	½	0	0	−	1		−	1	1	3½	2444
8	WGM Tatiana Stepovaya (Russia)	2384	0	0	0	0	0	0	+		1	1	3	2245
9	WGM Maria Manakova (Serbia)	2344	0	½	0	½	0	0	0	0		1	2	2229
10	IM Marina Romanko (Russia)	2449	0	0	0	½	1	0	0	0	0		1½	2164

=== 2010 ===
==== Men ====
63rd Russian Championship Superfinal, 11–22 December 2010, Moscow, Category XIX (2706)
	Player	Rating	1	2	3	4	5	6	7	8	9	10	11	12	Total	TPR	Place
1	Ian Nepomniachtchi (Russia)	2720		0	½	1	½	½	½	½	½	1	1	1	7	2807	1
2	Sergey Karjakin (Russia)	2760	1		½	½	0	½	½	½	1	1	½	1	7	2803	2
3	Alexander Grischuk (Russia)	2771	½	½		½	1	1	½	½	½	½	½	½	6½	2765	3
4	Peter Svidler (Russia)	2722	0	½	½		1	½	½	½	1	½	1	½	6½	2770	4
5	Vladimir Malakhov (Russia)	2712	½	1	0	0		1	½	½	½	½	½	½	5½	2706	5
6	Nikita Vitiugov (Russia)	2709	½	½	0	½	0		½	½	½	½	1	1	5½	2706	6
7	Dmitry Jakovenko (Russia)	2726	½	½	½	½	½	½		½	0	½	½	½	5	2669	7–8
8	Vladimir Potkin (Russia)	2646	½	½	½	½	½	½	½		½	0	½	½	5	2676	7–8
9	Igor Kurnosov (Russia)	2676	½	0	½	0	½	½	1	½		½	½	½	5	2673	9
10	Evgeny Tomashevsky (Russia)	2699	0	0	½	½	½	½	½	1	½		½	½	5	2671	10
11	Denis Khismatullin (Russia)	2659	0	½	½	0	½	0	½	½	½	½		½	4	2609	11
12	Vadim Zvjaginsev (Russia)	2676	0	0	½	½	½	0	½	½	½	½	½		4	2607	12

===== First-place tiebreak =====
Player	Rating	Rapid chess		Armageddon	Place
Ian Nepomniachtchi (Russia)	2720	½	½	½	1
Sergey Karjakin (Russia)	2760	½	½	½	2

==== Women ====
60th Russian Women's Championship Superfinal, 16–27 November 2010, Moscow, Category IX (2458)
	Player	Rating	1	2	3	4	5	6	7	8	9	10	11	12	Total	TPR
1	IM Alisa Galliamova (Russia)	2487		½	½	1	1	0	1	0	1	1	0	1	7	2557
2	WGM Natalia Pogonina (Russia)	2472	½		½	1	½	0	½	1	1	1	½	½	7	2559
3	GM Tatiana Kosintseva (Russia)	2581	½	½		0	1	½	½	½	1	½	1	1	7	2549
4	WGM Nazí Paikidze (Georgia)	2401	0	0	1		1	1	½	1	0	1	½	½	6½	2528
5	GM Alexandra Kosteniuk (Russia)	2507	0	½	0	0		1	1	1	½	½	1	0	5½	2453
6	WGM Valentina Gunina (Russia)	2479	1	1	½	0	0		0	0	0	1	½	1	5	2420
7	IM Nadezhda Kosintseva (Russia)	2576	0	½	½	½	0	1		1	1	0	½	0	5	2411
8	WGM Tatiana Shadrina (Russia)	2384	1	0	½	0	0	1	0		0	1	1	½	5	2429
9	WGM Vera Nebolsina (Russia)	2377	0	0	0	1	½	1	0	1		0	½	1	5	2429
10	IM Anastasia Bodnaruk (Russia)	2407	0	0	½	0	½	0	1	0	1		1	1	5	2427
11	WGM Olga Girya (Russia)	2435	1	½	0	½	0	½	½	0	½	0		1	4½	2395
12	IM Svetlana Matveeva (Russia)	2389	0	½	0	½	1	0	1	½	0	0	0		3½	2331

===== First-place tiebreak =====
Player	Rating	Rapid chess		Place
IM Alisa Galliamova (Russia)	2487	½	1	1
WGM Natalia Pogonina (Russia)	2472	½	0	2

=== 2011 ===
==== Men ====
64th Russian Championship Superfinal, 8–15 August 2011, Moscow, Category XIX (2715)
	Player	Rating	1	2	3	4	5	6	7	8	Total	SB	H2H	TPR
1	Peter Svidler (Russia)	2739		0	½	½	1	1	1	1	5			2869
2	Alexander Morozevich (Russia)	2694	1		1	½	½	0	½	1	4½			2820
3	Alexander Grischuk (Russia)	2746	½	0		1	½	½	1	½	4	12.75	1	2760
4	Sergey Karjakin (Russia)	2788	½	½	0		1	½	½	1	4	12.75	0	2754
5	Vladimir Kramnik (Russia)	2781	0	½	½	0		1	1	1	4	10.75		2755
6	Ian Nepomniachtchi (Russia)	2711	0	1	½	½	0		½	½	3			2665
7	Aleksandr Galkin (Russia)	2598	0	½	0	½	0	½		½	2			2574
8	Artyom Timofeev (Russia)	2665	0	0	½	0	0	½	½		1½			2492

==== Women ====
61st Russian Women's Championship Superfinal, 19–28 August 2011, Moscow, Category VII (2418)
	Player	Rating	1	2	3	4	5	6	7	8	9	10	Total	SB	TPR
1	WGM Valentina Gunina (Russia)	2487		0	1	½	½	1	1	1	½	1	6½		2576
2	IM Alisa Galliamova (Russia)	2492	1		1	0	½	1	0	1	½	½	5½	25.25	2489
3	WIM Daria Charochkina (Russia)	2310	0	0		1	1	1	½	0	1	1	5½	22.00	2510
4	WGM Natalia Pogonina (Russia)	2442	½	1	0		½	0	1	1	1	0	5	22.25	2458
5	WGM Baira Kovanova (Russia)	2354	½	½	0	½		1	½	0	1	1	5	20.50	2468
6	IM Elena Zaiatz (Russia)	2419	0	0	0	1	0		1	1	½	1	4½		2417
7	GM Alexandra Kosteniuk (Russia)	2497	0	1	½	0	½	0		1	½	½	4		2366
8	WGM Tatiana Shadrina (Russia)	2373	0	0	1	0	1	0	0		½	1	3½	14.25	2343
9	WGM Olga Girya (Russia)	2371	½	½	0	0	0	½	½	½		1	3½	14.00	2343
10	IM Anastasia Bodnaruk (Russia)	2431	0	½	0	1	0	0	½	0	0		2		2196

=== 2012 ===
==== Men ====
65th Russian Championship Superfinal, 3–12 August 2012, Moscow, Category XVIII (2699)
	Player	Rating	1	2	3	4	5	6	7	8	9	10	Total	TB	SB	TPR
1	Dmitry Andreikin (Russia)	2715		½	½	½	1	½	0	½	½	1	5	4		2740
2	Sergey Karjakin (Russia)	2785	½		½	½	½	1	½	½	½	½	5	3½		2733
3	Peter Svidler (Russia)	2749	½	½		½	½	½	1	½	½	½	5	3		2737
4	Dmitry Jakovenko (Russia)	2722	½	½	½		½	½	½	½	½	1	5	2½		2740
5	Vladimir Potkin (Russia)	2651	0	½	½	½		½	½	½	1	1	5	1½		2748
6	Evgeny Alekseev (Russia)	2673	½	0	½	½	½		½	½	1	1	5	½		2745
7	Alexander Grischuk (Russia)	2763	1	½	0	½	½	½		½	½	½	4½			2692
8	Daniil Dubov (Russia)	2594	½	½	½	½	½	½	½		0	½	4		18.50	2668
9	Nikita Vitiugov (Russia)	2705	½	½	½	½	0	0	½	1		½	4		17.50	2656
10	Sanan Sjugirov (Russia)	2635	0	½	½	0	0	0	½	½	½		2½			2540

===== Rapid playoff =====
	Player	Rapid rating	1	2	3	4	5	6	Total
1	Dmitry Andreikin (Russia)	2723		½	1	1	½	1	4
2	Sergey Karjakin (Russia)	2830	½		½	½	1	1	3½
3	Peter Svidler (Russia)	2733	0	½		1	½	1	3
4	Dmitry Jakovenko (Russia)	2714	0	½	0		1	1	2½
5	Vladimir Potkin (Russia)	2651	½	0	½	0		½	1½
6	Evgeny Alekseev (Russia)	2685	0	0	0	0	½		½

==== Women ====
62nd Russian Women's Championship Superfinal, 3–12 August 2012, Moscow, Category VIII (2445)
	Player	Rating	1	2	3	4	5	6	7	8	9	10	Total	SB	TPR
1	WGM Natalia Pogonina (Russia)	2448		1	½	½	1	1	½	½	½	1	6½		2611
2	IM Valentina Gunina (Russia)	2507	0		1	1	1	½	½	½	0	1	5½	23.25	2519
3	GM Nadezhda Kosintseva (Russia)	2524	½	0		1	½	½	½	½	1	1	5½	21.50	2517
4	IM Alisa Galliamova (Russia)	2465	½	0	0		½	1	1	½	½	1	5	19.75	2486
5	GM Tatiana Kosintseva (Russia)	2530	0	0	½	½		1	0	1	1	1	5	18.25	2479
6	WGM Olga Girya (Russia)	2433	0	½	½	0	0		1	1	1	1	5	18.00	2490
7	WGM Daria Charochkina (Russia)	2353	½	½	½	0	1	0		1	1	0	4½		2456
8	WGM Baira Kovanova (Russia)	2408	½	½	½	½	0	0	0		1	1	4		2407
9	WIM Ekaterina Ubiennykh (Russia)	2367	½	1	0	½	0	0	0	0		1	3		2329
10	IM Evgenija Ovod (Russia)	2419	0	0	0	0	0	0	1	0	0		1		2097

=== 2013 ===
==== Men ====
66th Russian Championship Superfinal, 5–14 October 2013, Nizhny Novgorod, Category XVIII (2696)
	Player	Rating	1	2	3	4	5	6	7	8	9	10	Total	TB	SB	TPR
1	Peter Svidler (Russia)	2740		1	½	½	1	½	½	½	1	1	6½	1½		2857
2	Ian Nepomniachtchi (Russia)	2702	0		1	1	1	½	1	½	½	1	6½	½		2861
3	Nikita Vitiugov (Russia)	2729	½	0		½	1	½	½	1	1	½	5½		22.00	2772
4	Vladimir Kramnik (Russia)	2796	½	0	½		0	½	1	1	1	1	5½		19.75	2765
5	Dmitry Andreikin (Russia)	2706	0	0	0	1		1	½	1	½	1	5			2738
6	Sergey Karjakin (Russia)	2762	½	½	½	½	0		½	½	½	1	4½		18.25	2689
7	Ernesto Inarkiev (Russia)	2695	½	0	½	0	½	½		1	1	½	4½		17.25	2696
8	Aleksey Goganov (Russia)	2575	½	½	0	0	0	½	0		1	1	3½			2629
9	Alexander Motylev (Russia)	2676	0	½	0	0	½	½	0	0		1	2½			2532
10	Anton Shomoev (Russia)	2579	0	0	½	0	0	0	½	0	0		1			2358

==== Women ====
63rd Russian Women's Championship Superfinal, 5–14 October 2013, Nizhny Novgorod, Category VIII (2448)
	Player	Rating	1	2	3	4	5	6	7	8	9	10	Total	SB	Wins	TPR
1	GM Valentina Gunina (Russia)	2506		½	1	½	1	1	½	1	1	½	7			2662
2	GM Alexandra Kosteniuk (Russia)	2495	½		1	½	0	½	1	1	1	1	6½			2609
3	WGM Natalia Pogonina (Russia)	2485	0	0		½	1	½	1	1	½	1	5½			2524
4	IM Ekaterina Kovalevskaya (Russia)	2410	½	½	½		½	½	½	0	½	1	4½	19.75		2452
5	WGM Baira Kovanova (Russia)	2396	0	1	0	½		½	0	½	1	1	4½	18.25	3	2454
6	WGM Aleksandra Goryachkina (Russia)	2436	0	½	½	½	½		½	½	1	½	4½	18.25	1	2449
7	GM Tatiana Kosintseva (Russia)	2515	½	0	0	½	1	½		0	½	½	3½	15.25		2361
8	IM Anastasia Bodnaruk (Russia)	2459	0	0	0	1	½	½	1		0	½	3½	13.75		2367
9	WGM Alina Kashlinskaya (Russia)	2435	0	0	½	½	0	0	½	1		½	3			2324
10	WGM Daria Charochkina (Russia)	2343	½	0	0	0	0	½	½	½	½		2½			2294

=== 2014 ===
==== Men ====
67th Russian Championship Superfinal, 28 November – 7 December 2014, Kazan, Tatarstan, Russia, Category XIX (2712)
	Player	Rating	1	2	3	4	5	6	7	8	9	10	Total	SB	Wins	H2H	Koya	TPR	Place
1	Igor Lysyj (Sverdlovsk Oblast)	2686		0	1	½	½	1	1	0	½	1	5½					2795	1
2	Dmitry Jakovenko (Khanty-Mansi Autonomous Okrug)	2745	1		½	½	½	½	½	½	½	½	5					2752	2
3	Denis Khismatullin (Bashkortostan)	2679	0	½		½	½	1	1	0	½	½	4½	20.00	2			2716	3
4	Peter Svidler (Saint Petersburg)	2743	½	½	½		½	½	0	1	½	½	4½	20.00	1	½	2.5	2709	4–5
5	Ian Nepomniachtchi (Moscow)	2714	½	½	½	½		0	½	½	½	1	4½	20.00	1	½	2.5	2712	4–5
6	Nikita Vitiugov (Saint Petersburg)	2738	0	½	0	½	1		½	1	½	½	4½	19.50	2	½	2.5	2709	6–7
7	Alexander Morozevich (Moscow)	2724	0	½	0	1	½	½		½	1	½	4½	19.50	2	½	2.5	2711	6–7
8	Vadim Zvjaginsev (Moscow)	2655	1	½	1	0	½	0	½		½	0	4	19.00				2676	8
9	Boris Grachev (Moscow)	2669	½	½	½	½	½	½	0	½		½	4	18.25				2674	9
10	Sergey Karjakin (Moscow)	2770	0	½	½	½	0	½	½	1	½		4	17.50				2663	10

==== Women ====
64th Russian Women's Championship Superfinal, 28 November – 7 December 2014, Kazan, Tatarstan, Russia, Category IX (2453)
	Player	Rating	1	2	3	4	5	6	7	8	9	10	Total	SB	TPR
1	GM Valentina Gunina (Moscow)	2522		1	0	1	1	0	1	1	1	1	7		2666
2	IM Alisa Galliamova (Tatarstan)	2471	0		½	1	0	1	1	1	1	½	6		2576
3	WGM Aleksandra Goryachkina (Yamalo-Nenets Autonomous Okrug)	2438	1	½		0	1	½	0	1	½	1	5½	23.00	2535
4	WGM Olga Girya (Khanty-Mansi Autonomous Okrug)	2457	0	0	1		1	1	½	0	1	1	5½	21.75	2533
5	IM Alina Kashlinskaya (Moscow)	2439	0	1	0	0		½	1	½	1	1	5		2498
6	IM Ekaterina Kovalevskaya (Moscow)	2439	1	0	½	0	½		0	1	½	1	4½	18.00	2455
7	GM Alexandra Kosteniuk (Moscow)	2541	0	0	1	½	0	1		1	1	0	4½	17.75	2444
8	IM Anastasia Bodnaruk (Saint Petersburg)	2411	0	0	0	1	½	0	0		0	1	2½	10.00	2292
9	WGM Natalia Pogonina (Saratov Oblast)	2480	0	0	½	0	0	½	0	1		½	2½	8.75	2284
10	WFM Oksana Gritsayeva (Republic of Crimea)	2335	0	½	0	0	0	0	1	0	½		2		2246

=== 2015 ===
==== Men ====
68th Russian Championship Superfinal, 9–20 August 2015, Chita, Zabaykalsky Krai, Russia, Category XVIII (2694)
	Player	Rating	1	2	3	4	5	6	7	8	9	10	11	12	Total	Black	SB	Wins	H2H	TPR
1	Evgeny Tomashevsky (Saratov Oblast)	2747		½	½	½	½	1	½	1	½	1	½	1	7½					2823
2	Sergey Karjakin (Moscow)	2753	½		½	½	½	1	1	½	1	½	½	½	7					2791
3	Nikita Vitiugov (Saint Petersburg)	2719	½	½		½	½	1	½	½	½	1	½	½	6½					2757
4	Dmitry Jakovenko (Khanty-Mansi Autonomous Okrug)	2759	½	½	½		1	½	0	½	½	½	½	½	5½	6	30.25	1	1	2688
5	Daniil Dubov (Moscow)	2654	½	½	½	0		1	½	½	½	½	½	½	5½	6	30.25	1	0	2698
6	Denis Khismatullin (Bashkortostan)	2642	0	0	0	½	0		1	½	1	½	1	1	5½	6	26.25			2699
7	Vladislav Artemiev (Omsk Oblast)	2671	½	0	½	1	½	0		0	½	½	1	1	5½	5				2696
8	Igor Lysyj (Sverdlovsk Oblast)	2673	0	½	½	½	½	½	1		0	½	½	½	5	6	27.00			2660
9	Peter Svidler (Saint Petersburg)	2739	½	0	½	½	½	0	½	1		½	½	½	5	6	26.75			2654
10	Ivan Bukavshin (Samara Oblast)	2655	0	½	0	½	½	½	½	½	½		½	1	5	5				2662
11	Alexander Motylev (Moscow)	2658	½	½	½	½	½	0	0	½	½	½		0	4	5	23.50			2596
12	Ildar Khairullin (Saint Petersburg)	2662	0	½	½	½	½	0	0	½	½	0	1		4	5	21.25			2595

==== Women ====
65th Russian Women's Championship Superfinal, 9–20 August 2015, Chita, Zabaykalsky Krai, Russia, Category IX (2460)
	Player	Rating	1	2	3	4	5	6	7	8	9	10	11	12	Total	Black	SB	TPR
1	WGM Aleksandra Goryachkina (Yamalo-Nenets Autonomous Okrug)	2474		1	½	1	1	½	0	1	½	1	½	1	8			2634
2	IM Anastasia Bodnaruk (Saint Petersburg)	2431	0		½	½	½	½	1	½	½	1	1	1	7	6		2565
3	GM Alexandra Kosteniuk (Moscow)	2526	½	½		0	1	½	1	½	1	½	1	½	7	5		2556
4	IM Ekaterina Kovalevskaya (Moscow)	2453	0	½	1		1	½	½	½	½	½	½	1	6½	6		2526
5	GM Valentina Gunina (Moscow)	2531	0	½	0	0		1	1	1	1	0	1	1	6½	5		2519
6	GM Kateryna Lagno (Moscow)	2530	½	½	½	½	0		½	0	1	1	1	½	6			2490
7	IM Anastasia Savina (Moscow)	2429	1	0	0	½	0	½		½	1	1	½	½	5½	5	27.75	2463
8	WGM Olga Girya (Khanty-Mansi Autonomous Okrug)	2487	0	½	½	½	0	1	½		½	1	0	1	5½	5	27.50	2458
9	WGM Natalia Pogonina (Saratov Oblast)	2460	½	½	0	½	0	0	0	½		½	1	½	4			2358
10	IM Evgenija Ovod (Leningrad Oblast)	2327	0	0	½	½	1	0	0	0	½		0	1	3½	6		2339
11	IM Alina Kashlinskaya (Moscow)	2441	½	0	0	½	0	0	½	1	0	1		0	3½	5		2329
12	IM Marina Guseva (Stavropol Krai)	2431	0	0	½	0	0	½	½	0	½	0	1		3			2288

=== 2016 ===
==== Men ====
69th Russian Championship Superfinal, 16–27 October 2016, Novosibirsk, Novosibirsk Oblast, Russia, Category XVIII (2684)
	Player	Rating	1	2	3	4	5	6	7	8	9	10	11	12	Total	Black	SB	TPR
1	Alexander Riazantsev (Moscow)	2651		½	½	½	½	½	½	1	½	½	1	1	7			2789
2	Alexander Grischuk (Moscow)	2752	½		½	½	½	1	½	½	½	½	1	½	6½	6		2742
3	Evgeny Tomashevsky (Saratov Oblast)	2724	½	½		½	½	½	½	½	½	1	½	1	6½	5		2745
4	Peter Svidler (Saint Petersburg)	2745	½	½	½		½	½	½	½	½	1	½	½	6	5	32.50	2714
5	Vladimir Fedoseev (Saint Petersburg)	2665	½	½	½	½		0	1	½	½	½	½	1	6	5	31.25	2721
6	Grigoriy Oparin (Moscow)	2617	½	0	½	½	1		½	½	1	0	½	½	5½	6	30.25	2690
7	Nikita Vitiugov (Saint Petersburg)	2721	½	½	½	½	0	½		½	½	½	½	1	5½	6	28.50	2680
8	Dmitry Jakovenko (Khanty-Mansi Autonomous Okrug)	2714	0	½	½	½	½	½	½		0	1	½	1	5½	6	27.75	2681
9	Aleksey Goganov (Saint Petersburg)	2635	½	½	½	½	½	0	½	1		½	½	½	5½	5		2688
10	Ernesto Inarkiev (Moscow)	2732	½	½	0	0	½	1	½	0	½		½	1	5			2643
11	Dmitry Kokarev (Penza Oblast)	2636	0	0	½	½	½	½	½	½	½	½		½	4½			2623
12	Dmitry Bocharov (Novosibirsk Oblast)	2611	0	½	0	½	0	½	0	0	½	0	½		2½			2478

==== Women ====
66th Russian Women's Championship Superfinal, 16–27 October 2016, Novosibirsk, Novosibirsk Oblast, Russia, Category VIII (2441)
	Player	Rating	1	2	3	4	5	6	7	8	9	10	11	12	Total	Black	SB	TPR
1	GM Alexandra Kosteniuk (Moscow)	2537		0	1	½	1	½	1	1	1	½	1	1	8½			2641
2	WGM Natalia Pogonina (Saratov Oblast)	2484	1		1	½	1	0	½	½	½	1	1	0	7			2537
3	IM Anastasia Bodnaruk (Saint Petersburg)	2463	0	0		½	1	½	1	0	1	1	½	1	6½			2502
4	WGM Olga Girya (Khanty-Mansi Autonomous Okrug)	2446	½	½	½		0	1	½	0	½	1	½	1	6	6	30.25	2473
5	GM Valentina Gunina (Moscow)	2535	0	0	0	1		0	1	1	0	1	1	1	6	6	27.00	2465
6	IM Daria Charochkina (Moscow)	2336	½	1	½	0	1		0	1	½	0	½	1	6	5	32.25	2483
7	FM Daria Pustovoitova (Moscow)	2386	0	½	0	½	0	1		½	½	1	1	1	6	5	27.25	2478
8	IM Evgenija Ovod (Leningrad Oblast)	2362	0	½	1	1	0	0	½		½	½	½	1	5½			2444
9	WGM Aleksandra Goryachkina (Yamalo-Nenets Autonomous Okrug)	2460	0	½	0	½	1	½	½	½		0	½	1	5			2399
10	IM Alisa Galliamova (Tatarstan)	2450	½	0	0	0	0	1	0	½	1		0	1	4			2334
11	IM Alina Kashlinskaya (Moscow)	2462	0	0	½	½	0	½	0	½	½	1		0	3½			2302
12	WIM Ekaterina Ubiennykh (Krasnoyarsk Krai)	2346	0	1	0	0	0	0	0	0	0	0	1		2			2184

=== 2017 ===
==== Men ====
70th Russian Championship Superfinal, 3–14 December 2017, Saint Petersburg, Russia, Category XVIII (2690)
	Player	Rating	1	2	3	4	5	6	7	8	9	10	11	12	Total	TB	Black	SB	TPR
1	Peter Svidler (Saint Petersburg)	2765		½	0	1	½	½	1	½	½	½	1	1	7	2			2785
2	Nikita Vitiugov (Saint Petersburg)	2722	½		½	1	½	½	½	½	½	½	1	1	7	0			2789
3	Daniil Dubov (Moscow)	2683	1	½		½	0	½	0	1	½	½	1	1	6½		5	33.00	2756
4	Vladimir Fedoseev (Saint Petersburg)	2718	0	0	½		1	1	0	½	1	1	½	1	6½		5	32.00	2753
5	Evgeny Tomashevsky (Saratov Oblast)	2713	½	½	1	0		½	½	½	½	½	½	1	6		6	31.50	2724
6	Alexander Riazantsev (Moscow)	2650	½	½	½	0	½		½	½	1	½	½	1	6		6	30.75	2730
7	Vladimir Malakhov (Moscow)	2686	0	½	1	0	1	½		½	0	½	½	1	6		5		2727
8	Ernesto Inarkiev (Moscow)	2689	½	½	0	½	½	½	½		½	½	½	½	5		6		2654
9	Sanan Sjugirov (Samara Oblast)	2650	½	½	½	0	½	0	1	½		½	1	0	5		5		2658
10	Maxim Matlakov (Saint Petersburg)	2735	½	½	½	0	½	½	½	½	½		½	0	4½				2621
11	Evgeny Romanov (Saint Petersburg)	2626	0	0	0	½	½	½	½	½	0	½		½	3½				2563
12	Sergey Volkov (Mordovia)	2645	0	0	0	0	0	0	0	½	1	1	½		3				2519

==== Women ====
67th Russian Women's Championship Superfinal, 3–14 December 2017, Saint Petersburg, Russia, Category VIII (2435)
	Player	Rating	1	2	3	4	5	6	7	8	9	10	11	12	Total	TB	Black	SB	TPR
1	WGM Aleksandra Goryachkina (Yamalo-Nenets Autonomous Okrug)	2486		½	0	1	½	0	½	1	1	1	1	½	7	2			2533
2	WGM Natalia Pogonina (Saratov Oblast)	2469	½		½	½	0	1	½	1	½	1	½	1	7	0			2534
3	IM Alina Kashlinskaya (Moscow)	2452	1	½		½	0	1	1	½	½	½	0	1	6½		6		2499
4	WGM Olga Girya (Khanty-Mansi Autonomous Okrug)	2484	0	½	½		1	½	½	1	½	½	½	1	6½		5		2496
5	IM Anastasia Bodnaruk (Saint Petersburg)	2428	½	1	1	0		0	½	½	½	½	½	1	6		5	32.25	2472
6	GM Valentina Gunina (Moscow)	2510	1	0	0	½	1		½	½	0	1	1	½	6		5	31.50	2464
7	WIM Polina Shuvalova (Moscow)	2385	½	½	½	0	½	½		½	0	0	1	1	5		6	26.25	2404
8	IM Marina Nechaeva (Moscow Oblast)	2424	0	0	½	½	½	½	½		1	½	½	½	5		6	26.00	2400
9	WFM Oksana Gritsayeva (Republic of Crimea)	2373	0	½	0	½	½	1	1	0		½	½	½	5		5		2405
10	IM Evgenija Ovod (Leningrad Oblast)	2364	0	0	½	½	½	0	1	½	½		½	½	4½				2377
11	IM Ekaterina Kovalevskaya (Moscow)	2405	0	½	1	½	½	0	0	½	½	½		0	4				2336
12	IM Alisa Galliamova (Tatarstan)	2443	½	0	0	0	0	½	0	½	½	½	1		3½				2302

=== 2018 ===
==== Men ====
71st Russian Championship Superfinal, 25 August – 5 September 2018, Satka, Chelyabinsk Oblast, Russia, Category XVIII (2685)
	Player	Rating	1	2	3	4	5	6	7	8	9	10	11	12	Total	TB	Black	SB	TPR
1	Dmitry Andreikin (Ryazan Oblast)	2710		½	½	½	1	½	½	1	½	½	½	1	7	1½			2785
2	Dmitry Jakovenko (Khanty-Mansi Autonomous Okrug)	2748	½		½	½	½	1	1	1	1	½	0	½	7	½			2781
3	Evgeny Tomashevsky (Saratov Oblast)	2702	½	½		½	½	½	½	1	½	½	1	½	6½				2749
4	Ernesto Inarkiev (Moscow)	2690	½	½	½		1	½	½	0	½	½	½	1	6		6	32.00	2721
5	Vladimir Fedoseev (Saint Petersburg)	2707	0	½	½	0		1	½	½	½	1	½	1	6		6	30.25	2719
6	Ian Nepomniachtchi (Moscow)	2768	½	0	½	½	0		1	½	1	½	½	1	6		5		2714
7	Grigoriy Oparin (Moscow)	2609	½	0	½	½	½	0		½	½	1	1	½	5½				2692
8	Daniil Dubov (Moscow)	2691	0	0	0	1	½	½	½		½	½	½	1	5		6		2649
9	Alexey Sarana (Moscow Oblast)	2613	½	0	½	½	½	0	½	½		½	1	½	5		5		2656
10	Nikita Vitiugov (Saint Petersburg)	2730	½	½	½	½	0	½	0	½	½		½	½	4½		6		2616
11	Mikhail Kobalia (Moscow)	2619	½	1	0	½	½	½	0	½	0	½		½	4½		5		2626
12	Denis Khismatullin (Bashkortostan)	2634	0	½	½	0	0	0	½	0	½	½	½		3				2515

==== Women ====
68th Russian Women's Championship Superfinal, 25 August – 5 September 2018, Satka, Chelyabinsk Oblast, Russia, Category VIII (2445)
	Player	Rating	1	2	3	4	5	6	7	8	9	10	11	12	Total	TB	Black	TPR
1	WGM Natalia Pogonina (Saratov Oblast)	2469		0	0	½	1	1	1	½	1	1	½	1	7½	1½		2575
2	WGM Olga Girya (Khanty-Mansi Autonomous Okrug)	2462	1		½	1	½	½	½	1	½	½	½	1	7½	½		2576
3	WGM Aleksandra Goryachkina (Yamalo-Nenets Autonomous Okrug)	2535	1	½		0	0	0	1	1	1	½	1	1	7		6	2538
4	IM Alina Kashlinskaya (Moscow)	2440	½	0	1		½	1	½	0	1	1	1	½	7		5	2547
5	GM Alexandra Kosteniuk (Moscow)	2559	0	½	1	½		½	0	0	1	1	1	1	6½		6	2499
6	GM Valentina Gunina (Moscow)	2528	0	½	1	0	½		½	1	½	1	½	1	6½		5	2502
7	IM Alisa Galliamova (Tatarstan)	2424	0	½	0	½	1	½		1	0	1	½	1	6			2482
8	WIM Polina Shuvalova (Moscow)	2413	½	0	0	1	1	0	0		½	1	0	1	5			2411
9	WFM Oksana Gritsayeva (Republic of Crimea)	2391	0	½	0	0	0	½	1	½		0	1	½	4			2347
10	WIM Elena Tomilova (Stavropol Krai)	2332	0	½	½	0	0	0	0	0	1		1	½	3½			2322
11	IM Anastasia Bodnaruk (Saint Petersburg)	2449	½	½	0	0	0	½	½	1	0	0		0	3			2269
12	WFM Anastasiya Protopopova (Saratov Oblast)	2332	0	0	0	½	0	0	0	0	½	½	1		2½			2244

=== 2019 ===
==== Men ====
72nd Russian Championship Superfinal, 10–22 August 2019, Votkinsk – Izhevsk, Udmurtia, Russia, Category XVIII (2688)
	Player	Rating	1	2	3	4	5	6	7	8	9	10	11	12	Total	Black	SB	TPR
1	Evgeny Tomashevsky (Saratov Oblast)	2706		½	½	½	1	½	½	1	½	1	½	½	7			2785
2	Nikita Vitiugov (Saint Petersburg)	2728	½		½	½	1	½	1	½	½	½	½	½	6½	6	35.25	2750
3	Maxim Matlakov (Saint Petersburg)	2710	½	½		½	½	½	1	½	1	½	½	½	6½	6	35.00	2751
4	Ernesto Inarkiev (Moscow)	2682	½	½	½		0	1	0	½	1	½	1	1	6½	6	33.50	2754
5	Vladislav Artemiev (Tatarstan)	2757	0	0	½	1		½	½	1	0	1	½	½	5½	6		2682
6	Alexander Motylev (Moscow)	2668	½	½	½	0	½		1	½	½	½	½	½	5½	5	29.75	2690
7	Alexandr Predke (Samara Oblast)	2650	½	0	0	1	½	0		½	½	1	½	1	5½	5	28.25	2692
8	Kirill Alekseenko (Saint Petersburg)	2668	0	½	½	½	0	½	½		½	1	½	1	5½	5	28.00	2690
9	Alexey Dreev (Moscow)	2662	½	½	0	0	1	½	½	½		½	½	½	5			2655
10	Vladimir Fedoseev (Saint Petersburg)	2671	0	½	½	½	0	½	0	0	½		1	1	4½	6		2625
11	Alexey Sarana (Moscow Oblast)	2655	½	½	½	0	½	½	½	½	½	0		½	4½	5		2626
12	Dmitry Jakovenko (Khanty-Mansi Autonomous Okrug)	2704	½	½	½	0	½	½	0	0	½	0	½		3½			2554

==== Women ====
69th Russian Women's Championship Superfinal, 10–22 August 2019, Votkinsk – Izhevsk, Udmurtia, Russia, Category VIII (2435)
	Player	Rating	1	2	3	4	5	6	7	8	9	10	11	12	Total	TB	Black	SB	TPR
1	WGM Olga Girya (Khanty-Mansi Autonomous Okrug)	2462		½	0	1	½	½	1	1	½	1	1	1	8	1+A			2608
2	WGM Natalia Pogonina (Saratov Oblast)	2457	½		½	1	½	½	0	1	1	1	1	1	8	1			2608
3	GM Aleksandra Goryachkina (Yamalo-Nenets Autonomous Okrug)	2564	1	½		½	½	1	½	½	½	1	½	1	7½				2556
4	GM Valentina Gunina (Moscow)	2497	0	0	½		1	1	1	1	½	1	0	1	7				2531
5	WFM Margarita Potapova (Krasnodar Krai)	2335	½	½	½	0		1	1	0	1	½	½	½	6		6	31.75	2480
6	IM Alina Kashlinskaya (Moscow)	2491	½	½	0	0	0		1	1	1	½	1	½	6		6	28.50	2466
7	GM Alexandra Kosteniuk (Moscow)	2507	0	1	½	0	0	0		1	1	0	1	1	5½				2429
8	IM Daria Charochkina (Moscow)	2352	0	0	½	0	1	0	0		½	1	1	1	5				2407
9	IM Anastasia Bodnaruk (Saint Petersburg)	2429	½	0	½	½	0	0	0	½		½	½	1	4		6		2334
10	WIM Polina Shuvalova (Moscow)	2419	0	0	0	0	½	½	1	0	½		½	1	4		5		2335
11	WIM Elena Tomilova (Rostov Oblast)	2376	0	0	½	1	½	0	0	0	½	½		0	3				2265
12	WFM Zarina Shafigullina (Tatarstan)	2332	0	0	0	0	½	½	0	0	0	0	1		2				2244

===== First-place tiebreak =====
Player	Rapid rating	Blitz rating	Rapid chess		Armageddon	Place
WGM Olga Girya (Khanty-Mansi Autonomous Okrug)	2359	2330	1	0	1	1
WGM Natalia Pogonina (Saratov Oblast)	2501	2302	0	1	0	2

=== 2020 ===
==== Men ====
73rd Russian Championship Superfinal, 4–16 December 2020, Moscow, Russia, Category XVIII (2690)
	Player	Rating	1	2	3	4	5	6	7	8	9	10	11	12	Total	Black	SB	TPR
1	Ian Nepomniachtchi (Moscow)	2784		1	½	0	½	½	½	½	1	1	1	1	7½			2814
2	Sergey Karjakin (Moscow)	2752	0		½	0	1	½	1	1	½	1	½	1	7			2786
3	Vladimir Fedoseev (St. Petersburg)	2674	½	½		1	½	½	½	½	½	1	½	½	6½	5	35.50	2756
4	Daniil Dubov (Moscow)	2702	1	1	0		½	0	½	½	1	½	1	½	6½	5	35.00	2753
5	Vladislav Artemiev (Tatarstan)	2711	½	0	½	½		0	½	½	1	1	½	+	6	6		2695
6	Maksim Chigaev (Tyumen Oblast)	2619	½	½	½	1	1		½	½	½	0	0	+	6	5		2704
7	Nikita Vitiugov (St. Petersburg)	2720	½	0	½	½	½	½		½	½	½	1	½	5½	5	28.50	2687
8	Peter Svidler (St. Petersburg)	2723	½	0	½	½	½	½	½		½	½	½	+	5½	5	27.75	2658
9	Andrey Esipenko (Rostov Oblast)	2686	0	½	½	0	0	½	½	½		½	1	+	5	6	23.25	2626
10	Maxim Matlakov (St. Petersburg)	2698	0	0	0	½	0	1	½	½	½		1	+	5	6	22.75	2625
11	Aleksey Goganov (St. Petersburg)	2594	0	½	½	0	½	1	0	½	0	0		½	3½			2565
12	Mikhail Antipov (Moscow)	2611	0	0	½	½	-	-	½	-	-	-	½		2			2579

==== Women ====
70th Russian Women's Championship Superfinal, 4–16 December 2020, Moscow, Russia, Category VIII (2428)
	Player	Rating	1	2	3	4	5	6	7	8	9	10	11	12	Total	TB	Black	SB	TPR
1	GM Aleksandra Goryachkina (Yamalo-Nenets Autonomous Okrug)	2593		½	½	½	½	½	1	½	1	1	1	1	8	1+A			2588
2	IM Polina Shuvalova (Moscow)	2456	½		1	1	1	½	0	1	½	1	½	1	8	1			2601
3	GM Alexandra Kosteniuk (Moscow)	2471	½	0		0	½	1	0	1	½	1	1	1	6½		6	29.75	2489
4	IM Marina Guseva (Moscow Oblast)	2359	½	0	1		0	0	1	0	1	1	1	1	6½		6	28.50	2500
5	IM Alina Kashlinskaya (Moscow)	2494	½	0	½	1		½	1	½	½	0	1	1	6½		5	32.50	2487
6	WGM Leya Garifullina (Sverdlovsk Oblast)	2348	½	½	0	1	½		½	½	½	½	1	1	6½		5	32.00	2501
7	IM Alisa Galliamova (Tatarstan)	2438	0	1	1	0	0	½		0	1	1	½	1	6		6		2463
8	WGM Natalia Pogonina (Saratov Oblast)	2474	½	0	0	1	½	½	1		½	0	1	1	6		5		2460
9	WGM Olga Girya (Khanty-Mansi Autonomous Okrug)	2464	0	½	½	0	½	½	0	½		0	1	½	4				2323
10	GM Valentina Gunina (Moscow)	2451	0	0	0	0	1	½	0	1	1		0	0	3½				2293
11	WFM Yulia Grigorieva (Bashkortostan)	2290	0	½	0	0	0	0	½	0	0	1		½	2½				2230
12	WFM Tatyana Getman (St. Petersburg)	2302	0	0	0	0	0	0	0	0	½	1	½		2				2178

===== First-place tiebreak =====
Player	Rapid rating	Blitz rating	Rapid chess		Armageddon	Place
GM Aleksandra Goryachkina (Yamalo-Nenets Autonomous Okrug)	2502	2441	½	½	1	1
IM Polina Shuvalova (Moscow)	2394	2299	½	½	0	2

=== 2021 ===
==== Open ====
74th Russian Championship Superfinal, 9–20 October 2021, Ufa, Russia, Category XVIII (2676.5)
	Player	Rating	1	2	3	4	5	6	7	8	9	10	11	12	Total	Black	SB	Wins	Koya	TPR
1	Nikita Vitiugov (St. Petersburg)	2727		½	1	1	½	½	½	½	1	½	½	½	7					2781
2	Maxim Matlakov (St. Petersburg)	2682	½		½	½	½	½	½	½	½	1	½	1	6½					2749
3	Vladimir Fedoseev (St. Petersburg)	2704	0	½		½	1	½	1	0	½	½	1	½	6	6				2710
4	Dmitry Andreikin (Ryazan Oblast)	2728	0	½	½		½	½	½	½	1	½	1	½	6	5				2708
5	Alexandr Predke (Samara Oblast)	2666	½	½	0	½		½	½	1	0	1	½	½	5½	6				2677
6	Andrey Esipenko (Rostov Oblast)	2720	½	½	½	½	½		½	½	½	½	½	½	5½	5	30.25			2672
7	Alexander Motylev (Moscow)	2624	½	½	0	½	½	½		1	½	0	½	1	5½	5	29.75	2	4	2681
8	Pavel Ponkratov (Moscow)	2659	½	½	1	½	0	½	0		½	½	½	1	5½	5	29.75	2	3½	2678
9	Kirill Alekseenko (St. Petersburg)	2710	0	½	½	0	1	½	½	½		1	½	½	5½	5	28.75			2673
10	Aleksandra Goryachkina (Yamalo-Nenets Autonomous Okrug)	2602	½	0	½	½	0	½	1	½	0		½	½	4½	6	24.25	1		2610
11	Aleksandr Rakhmanov (Vologda Oblast)	2657	½	½	0	0	½	½	½	½	½	½		½	4½	6	24.25	0		2605
12	Maksim Chigaev (Tyumen Oblast)	2639	½	0	½	½	½	½	0	0	½	½	½		4					2571

==== Women ====
71st Russian Women's Championship Superfinal, 9–20 October 2021, Ufa, Russia, Category VII (2422)
	Player	Rating	1	2	3	4	5	6	7	8	9	10	11	12	Total	Black	SB	TPR
1	GM Valentina Gunina (Moscow)	2462		½	½	1	½	½	1	½	1	1	½	1	8			2593
2	IM Evgenija Ovod (Leningrad Oblast)	2331	½		½	½	1	½	½	½	1	1	1	½	7½	6		2563
3	IM Polina Shuvalova (Moscow)	2509	½	½		½	½	1	½	½	1	½	1	1	7½	5		2547
4	IM Alina Kashlinskaya (Moscow)	2493	0	½	½		1	1	1	½	1	½	½	0	6½			2480
5	WGM Natalia Pogonina (Saratov Oblast)	2467	½	0	½	0		½	½	1	1	½	1	½	6	6		2454
6	WGM Leya Garifullina (Sverdlovsk Oblast)	2409	½	½	0	0	½		½	½	1	½	1	1	6	5		2459
7	IM Alisa Galliamova (Tatarstan)	2421	0	½	½	0	½	½		1	½	1	0	1	5½			2422
8	GM Olga Girya (Khanty-Mansi Autonomous Okrug)	2410	½	½	½	½	0	½	0		0	½	½	1	4½			2358
9	IM Marina Guseva (Moscow Oblast)	2394	0	0	0	0	0	0	½	1		1	1	½	4			2322
10	WGM Daria Voit (Moscow)	2357	0	0	½	½	½	½	0	½	0		½	½	3½	6	18.75	2295
11	IM Anastasia Bodnaruk (Saint Petersburg)	2415	½	0	0	½	0	0	1	½	0	½		½	3½	6	18.50	2289
12	IM Alina Bivol (Moscow)	2392	0	½	0	1	½	0	0	0	½	½	½		3½	5		2291
