= Ruslan Shcherbakov =

Russian chess grandmaster (born 1969)

Personal information
- Born: Ruslan Vladimirovich Shcherbakov; 14 September 1969 (age 56) Staraya Russa, Russian SFSR, USSR

Chess career
- Country: Soviet Union → Russia
- Title: Grandmaster (1992)
- FIDE rating: 2517 (July 2026)
- Peak rating: 2580 (July 1993)
- Peak ranking: No. 79 (July 1993)

Ruslan Shcherbakov (Russian: Руслан Владимирович Щербаков, romanized: Ruslan Vladimirovich Shcherbakov or Scherbakov or Sherbakov; born 14 September 1969) is a Russian chess player and trainer. He received the FIDE title of Grandmaster (GM) in 1992.

== Biography ==
Shcherbakov was born on 14 September 1969 in the small town of Staraya Russa, USSR. He first learned to play chess when he was four years old, but did not begin to study the game seriously until 1980, at the age of eleven. From 1981 to 1992, he attended Alexander Panchenko's chess school, and in 1990, he worked with Panchenko coaching the Russian team in the Soviet youth team championship. Members of this team included Vladimir Kramnik and Sergei Rublevsky.

Shcherbakov became a Soviet chess master in 1987, an international master in 1989, and a grandmaster in 1992. In 1990, he shared first place in the Russian Chess Championship with Andrei Kharlov, Vladimir Kramnik and Maxim Sorokin. Shcherbakov was part of the Russian team that won the gold medal at the European Senior Team Championship 2019 in the 50+ category. Also a trainer, among the players he has coached are Parimarjan Negi, Kateryna Lagno, and Dinara Saduakassova. Shcherbakov was awarded the title of FIDE Senior Trainer in 2014.

He and his wife, Tanya, have two children.
