= Alexei Bezgodov =

Russian chess grandmaster and writer

Alexei Mikhailovich Bezgodov
Personal information
- Born: Alexei Mikhailovich Bezgodov; 30 June 1969 (age 57)

Chess career
- Country: Russia
- Title: Grandmaster (1999)
- FIDE rating: 2406 (July 2026)
- Peak rating: 2576 (July 1999)

Alexei Mikhailovich Bezgodov (Russian: Алексей Михайлович Безгодов; born 30 June 1969) is a Russian chess grandmaster and writer.

== Chess career ==
Bezgodov won the 1993 Russian Chess Championship. He finished second in the 1995 Chigorin Memorial. He gained the Grandmaster title in 1999, and the same year he was the joint winner of the 1999 Ukrainian Chess Championship. (He did not obtain the title of Chess Champion of Ukraine, since he was Russian.) In December that year, he finished second in the Russian Chess Championship, after losing to Konstantin Sakaev 3–1 in the final.

Bezgodov played on the second board of the team Russia "D" in the 39th Chess Olympiad (2010), scoring 7/10 (+5−1=4). In the Chess World Cup 2011, Bezgodov was eliminated in the first round by Nikita Vitiugov, who beat him 4–2. Bezgodov qualified as one of the four nominees of the local Organising Committee.

== Books ==
- Challenging the Sicilian with 2.a3!?. Chess Stars, Sofia. 2004. ISBN 954-8782-375.
- The Extreme Caro–Kann: Attacking Black with 3.f3. New In Chess. 2014. ISBN 978-90-5691-469-1.
- The Liberated Bishop Defence: A Surprising and Complete Black Repertoire against 1.d4. New In Chess. 2015. ISBN 978-90-5691-547-6.
- The Art of the Tarrasch Defence: Strategies, Techniques and Surprising Ideas. New In Chess. 2017. ISBN 9789056917685
- Defend Like Petrosian: What You Can Learn From TIgran Petrosian's Extraordinary Defensive Skills. New In Chess. 2020. ISBN 978-90-5691-923-8

Sporting positions
Preceded by Alexei Gavrilov	Russian Chess Champion; 1993	Succeeded by Peter Svidler
