= Orest Gritsak =

Ukrainian chess grandmaster (born 1973)

- Orest Gritsak in Warsaw, 2012

Personal information
- Born: 24 February 1973 (age 53) Lviv, Ukrainian SSR, Soviet Union

Chess career
- Country: Soviet Union → Ukraine
- Title: Grandmaster (2001)
- FIDE rating: 2468 (November 2026)
- Peak rating: 2550 (July 1999)

Orest Gritsak (Ukrainian: Орест Ігорович Грицак; born 24 February 1973) is a Ukrainian chess Grandmaster (2001).

== Chess career ==
Gritsak achieved the biggest success of his career in 1993 by winning the Ukrainian Chess Championship held in Donetsk. The following year, he won the Józef Dominik Memorial in Dobczyce. In 1998, he tied for first place with Piotr Staniszewski in an open tournament in Krynica-Zdrój, and tied for second place in the strong MK Cafe tournament in Koszalin (behind Igor Khenkin, alongside Michał Krasenkow, Alexander Beliavsky, Eduardas Rozentalis, Emil Sutovsky, Zbyněk Hráček, and Igor Novikov). The next year, he shared second place (behind Alexander Rustemov, together with Paweł Jaracz) in Świdnica. In 2001, he won in Lviv and tied for first place (with Volodymyr Baklan and Robert Kempiński) at the Akiba Rubinstein Memorial in Polanica-Zdrój. In 2002, he finished second (behind Yuri Yakovich) in Stockholm.

In 1999 and 2002, he twice won the Royal Gambit of Radom (Królewski Gambit Radomia), a recurring rapid chess tournament held in Radom.

He achieved his highest FIDE rating on 1 July 1999, with a score of 2550 points, ranking 15th among Ukrainian chess players at the time.
