= Alexey Korotylev =

Russian chess grandmaster (born 1977)

Personal information
- Born: Алексей Коротылёв; 1 March 1977 (age 49)

Chess career
- Country: Russia
- Title: Grandmaster (2000)
- FIDE rating: 2573 (July 2026)
- Peak rating: 2620 (April 2007)
- Peak ranking: No. 97 (April 2006)

Alexey Korotylev (Алексей Коротылёв; born 1 March 1977) is a Russian chess Grandmaster.

In 2001 he tied for 1st–2nd with Semen Dvoirys at the Geneva Open. In 2002 he tied for 2nd–5th with Vasily Yemelin, Pavel Smirnov and Alexander Rustemov in the Russian Chess Championship. In 2004 he qualified for the superfinal of the Russian championship in Moscow. With in total 11 players, Korotilev scored 4.5 points out of 10 games, amongst which a defeat of Alexander Grischuk and a draw against the winner Garry Kasparov. In 2009, he tied for 2nd–6th with Viorel Iordăchescu, Ernesto Inarkiev, Ian Nepomniachtchi and Sergei Tiviakov at the Moscow Open tournament.

== Notable games ==
- Alexey Korotylev vs Garry Kasparov, Russian Championships 2004, Queen's Indian Defense: Kasparov-Petrosian Variation, 1/2-1/2
- Joost Wempe vs Alexey Korotylev, Corus Tournament: Group C 2005, Pirc Defense: Austrian Attack, 0-1
