= Ildar Ibragimov =

Russian chess player

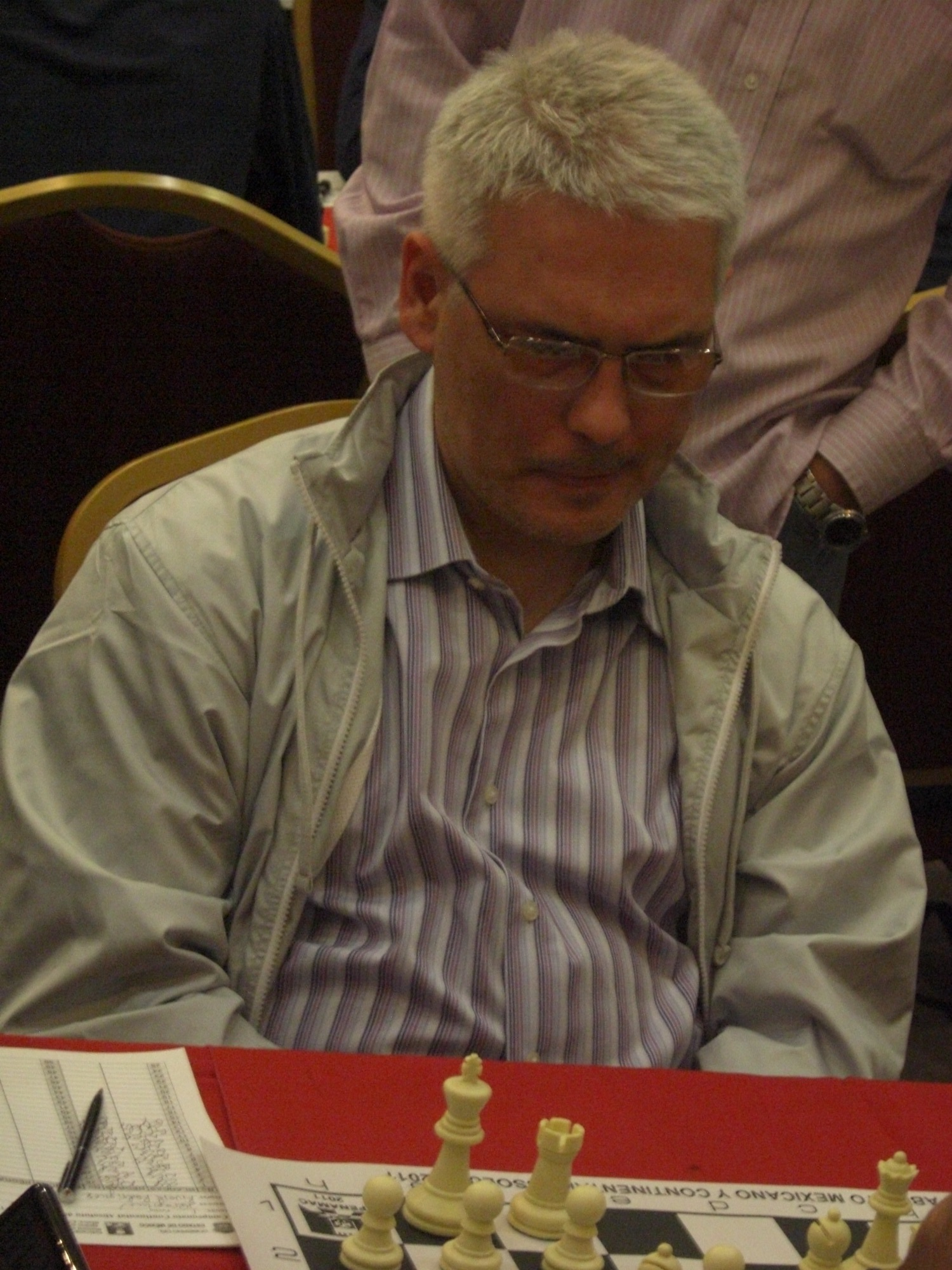
- Ibragimov in 2011

Personal information
- Born: 16 August 1967 (age 58) Kazan, Russian SFSR, Soviet Union

Chess career
- Country: Soviet Union → Russia; United States (2002–2015)
- Title: Grandmaster (1993)
- FIDE rating: 2533 (July 2026)
- Peak rating: 2637 (April 2006)
- Peak ranking: No. 60 (July 1998)

Ildar Ibragimov (Tatar: Илдар Ибраһимов; Russian: Ильдар Ибрагимов; born 16 August 1967) is a Russian chess player. He was ranked No. 72 in January 2000 with a rating of 2611, while his peak rating of 2637 was achieved in April 2006.

== Chess career ==
Ibragimov shared first place with Vladimir Kramnik and Andrei Kharlov at the 1991 USSR Under-26 Championship. He was awarded the title of Grandmaster by FIDE in 1993. Ibragimov won the Chigorin Memorial in 1994 and the Biel Masters Open tournament in 1997. In 2002 he started to play for the United States, where he lived in New Haven, Connecticut. He was a co-winner of the 2004 U.S. Open and shared third place in the 2006 U.S. Chess Championship. Ibragimov played for the US team that took the bronze medal in the 2006 Chess Olympiad. He tied for first in the 2006 World Open. In 2015 Ibragimov transferred his national federation back to Russia. He was part of the Russian team that won the gold medal at the European Senior Team Championship 2019 in the 50+ category.

Born in Kazan, he is an ethnic Tatar.
