= Alexander Panchenko =

Russian chess grandmaster (1953–2009)

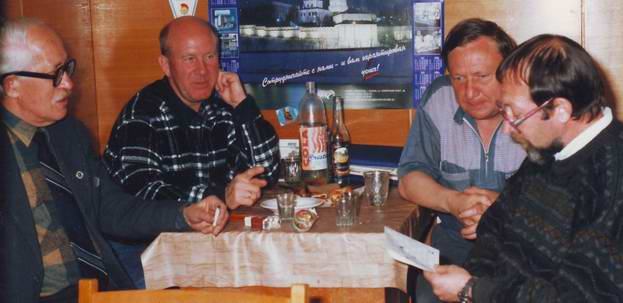

Personal information
- Born: October 5, 1953 Chelyabinsk, Soviet Union
- Died: May 19, 2009 (aged 55) Kazan, Russia

Chess career
- Country: Russia
- Title: Grandmaster (1980)
- Peak rating: 2530 (January 1981)

Alexander Nikolayevich Panchenko (Russian: Александр Николаевич Панченко; 5 October 1953 in Chelyabinsk – 19 May 2009 in Kazan) was a Russian chess Grandmaster and honored coach who headed the All-Russian chess school Chessmetrics.com, which provides retroactive guesstimates on the ratings of older players, places his highest ranking as 45th in the world in 1981. He should not be confused with a younger and somewhat weaker player of the same name. Panchenko's middle initial is "N", while his namesake has a middle initial of "G".

== Life and career ==
Panchenko was born and raised in Chelyabinsk. He started playing chess at the local Pioneers Palace and then was mentored by Leonid Gratvol at Krupskaya Chess School. In 1971, Panchenko won the Youth Chess Championship and was named Soviet champion in 1978, and RSFSR champion in 1979. In 1981, he won an international chess tournament in Sochi, becoming grandmaster of second rank. After a successful win at the tournament he was offered a position by Vera Tikhomirova to lead the Russian Chess School. Following the acceptance of a position, Panchenko trained such future grandmasters as Sergei Rublevsky, Ekaterina Kovalevskaya, Alisa Galliamova, and Sergey Volkov.

Panchenko served as head coach of the 4th juniors' games in Kramatorsk, Soviet Union, which include such chess champions as Alexey Dreev, Igor Khenkin, Ruslan Shcherbakov, Maxim Sorokin, and Mikhail Ulibin. He also headed the women’s Olympic team at the 30th Chess Olympiad. Panchenko authored the two-volume Theory and Practice of Chess Endings, which is still used by grandmasters to this day, and Mastering Chess Middlegames: Lectures from the All-Russian School of Grandmasters.
