= Tema Filanovskaya =

Soviet chess player (1915–1994)

Personal information
- Born: 7 August 1915 Yekaterinburg, Russia
- Died: 13 December 1994 (aged 79) Yekaterinburg, Russia

Chess career
- Country: Soviet Union

Tema Filanovskaya (Russian: Тэма Григорьевна Филановская; 7 August 1915, Yekaterinburg — 13 December 1994, Yekaterinburg) was a Soviet chess player who three times won the Russian SFSR Women Chess Championship (1951, 1954, 1955).

== Chess career ==
Tema Filanovskaya was one of the strongest female players of Russian SFSR and Sverdlovsk city. Four-time women's chess champion of the city of Sverdlovsk (1939, 1949, 1959, 1961), three time women's chess champion of the Sverdlovsk Oblast (1939, 1960, 1964), and three time women's chess champion of the Russian Soviet Federative Socialist Republic (1951, 1954–55). From 1946 to 1962 she nine times participated in the USSR Women's Chess Championship. Also Tema Filanovskaya as Russian SFRS chess team member two times won Soviet Team Chess Championship (1951, 1955).

She worked as an engineer economist, was a member of the Soviet sports society Iskra. During the World War II Tema Filanovskaya took part in the patronage of hospital work and played chess simultaneous exhibition in hospitals.

Buried at the Northern ("Severnyj") cemetery in Yekaterinburg.

== Literature ==
- Игорь Бердичевский. Шахматная еврейская энциклопедия. Москва: Русский шахматный дом, 2016. ISBN 978-5-94693-503-6
