= Oleg Dementiev =

Russian chess player

Personal information
- Full name: Oleg Ivanovich Dementiev
- Born: 30 April 1938 Sverdlovsk
- Died: 15 November 1991 (aged 53) Kaliningrad

Chess career
- Country: Soviet Union

Oleg Ivanovich Dementiev (Russian: Олег Иванович Дементьев; 30 April 1938, Sverdlovsk - 15 November 1991, Kaliningrad) was a Russian chess master who won the Russian Chess Championship in 1971.

== Biography ==
In 1965 became in a Soviet chess master. He successfully participated in the Russian Chess Championships. In 1970 in Kuibyshev he shared 3rd and 4th place (won by Anatoly Karpov), but in 1971 in Penza he shared 1st place with Valery Zilberstein. In 1970 he participated in the USSR Chess Championship final in Riga and shared 10th and 11th place. In 1974 he won the Burevestnik Soviet sports society chess championship. Starting in the mid-1970s he worked as a coach in Kaliningrad and there contributed to the development of chess.
