= Ludmila Zaitseva =

Russian chess player (born 1956)

Personal information
- Full name: Ludmila Georgievna Zaitseva
- Born: 10 February 1956 (age 70) Voroshilov, Russia

Chess career
- Country: Russia
- Title: Woman Grandmaster (1986)
- FIDE rating: 2352 (January 2004)
- Peak rating: 2399 (January 2000)

Ludmila Georgievna Zaitseva (Russian: Людмила Георгиевна Зайцева; born 10 February 1956) is a Russian chess player who holds the title Woman Grandmaster (WGM, 1986). She is a two-time winner the Russian Women's Chess Championship (1993, 1996).

== Biography ==
In the 1980s, Ludmila Zaitseva was a participant of the multiple USSR Women's Chess Championship finals. Two times she won the Soviet Team Chess Championship: in 1983, with the Moscow city team, and in 1985 as a member of the Russian SFSR team. In 1987, Ludmila Zaitseva participated in the Women's World Chess Championship Interzonal Tournament in Zheleznovodsk where shared 3rd-4th place with Agnieszka Brustman. An additional match between the two chess players ended in a draw - 3:3, and thanks to better Berger score in the main tournament Brustmane entered in the 1986 Women's Candidates Tournament. In 1995, Ludmila Zaitseva second time participated in the Women's World Chess Championship Interzonal Tournament in Chișinău where shared 32nd-38th place. Ludmila Zaitseva two times won Russian Women's Chess Championship: in 1993, and in 1996. In 1996, she won Ludmila Rudenko memorial chess tournament in Saint Petersburg. In 1998, Ludmila Zaitseva reached the Russian Women's Chess Cup semi-final in which she lost Svetlana Prudnikova, and also she lost Alisa Galliamova in the match for the 3rd place. In 2003, Ludmila Zaitseva shared first place in the Women's Chess tournament dedicated to the 300th anniversary of the foundation of St. Petersburg.

Ludmila Zaitseva played for Russia in the Women's Chess Olympiads:

- In 1994, at second board in the 31st Chess Olympiad (women) in Moscow (+4, =2, -3),
- In 1996, at first reserve board in the 32nd Chess Olympiad (women) in Yerevan (+3, =2, -1) and won team bronze medal.

Ludmila Zaitseva played for Russia in the European Team Chess Championship:

- In 1992, at first reserve board in the 1st European Team Chess Championship (women) in Debrecen (+3, =2, -2).

In 1982, she was awarded the FIDE Woman International Master (WIM) title and received the FIDE Woman Grandmaster (WGM) title four years later.
