= Tatiana Stepovaya =

Russian chess player (born 1965)

Personal information
- Born: 23 September 1965 (age 61) Krasnodar, Russia

Chess career
- Country: Soviet Union; Russia
- Title: Woman Grandmaster (1992)
- Peak rating: 2451 (July 2001)

Tatiana Stepovaya (Russian: Татьяна Юрьевна Степовая; born 23 September 1965 in Krasnodar, also Tatiana Stepovaya-Dianchenko) is a Russian chess player who holds the title of the FIDE title of Woman Grandmaster (WGM).

== Chess career ==
Stepovaya was Russian Women's Champion in 1987, 1988 and 1989. Many international chess tournament winner: divided the first place with Alisa Galliamova in Rostov-on-Don (1995), won in Tallinn (2002) and won Elisaveta Bykova Memorial in Vladimir (2006). In 2000 in Batumi Stepovaya reached inaugural European Individual Women Chess Championship semi-final, where lost to Natalia Zhukova, and together with the Women's World Chess ex-Champion Maia Chiburdanidze divided 3rd-4th place. In 2001 Stepovaya with Yugoslavian chess club Agrouniverzal Zemun won the European Chess Club Cup for women.

Stepovaya has played for Russia in three Chess Olympiads (1992, 1998-2000). She won team silver (1998) and bronze (2000) medals, and individual gold and silver (both 1998) medals.
