= Rimma Bilunova =

Russian chess player

Personal information
- Born: Rimma Ivanovna Bilunova; August 21, 1940 Kurgan Oblast, RSFSR, USSR
- Died: December 21, 2015 (aged 75) Moscow, Russia

Chess career
- Country: Soviet Union; Russia
- Title: Master of Sports of the USSR (1966); Woman International Master (1968)

Rimma Ivanovna Bilunova (Russian: Римма Ивановна Билунова; née Kazmina; August 21, 1940 – December 21, 2015) was a Russian chess player who was awarded the FIDE title of Woman International Master (WIM) in 1968, head coach of USSR's women's national team (1983–1988) and Honored coach of the RSFSR. She was twice women's champion of the RSFSR (1966 and 1968) and of the Armed Forces of the USSR (1966 and 1968). In later years, she became a chess administrator and journalist.

== Family ==
- Father – Ivan Kazmin, he worked in the Ministry of Agriculture of the USSR
- Husband – Boris Bilunov, historian and chess player
- Son – Denis
