= Marina Guseva =

Russian chess player (born 1986)

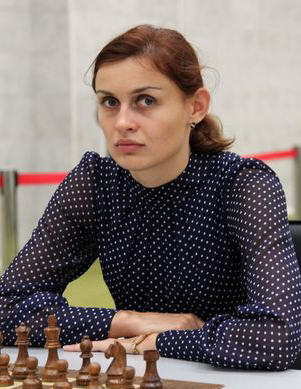
- Marina Guseva, Super Final of the Russian Chess Championship 2015

Personal information
- Born: 5 August 1986 (age 39) Fryazino, Moscow Oblast, Russian SFSR, Soviet Union

Chess career
- Country: Russia
- Title: International Master (2009); Woman Grandmaster (2006)
- Peak rating: 2466 (April 2009)

Marina Guseva (also known as Marina Romanko and Marina Nechaeva; born 5 August 1986) is a Russian chess player who holds the titles of International Master (IM) and Woman Grandmaster (WGM). In 2009, she was a member of the Russian team that won the silver medal in the Women's World Team Chess Championship in Ningbo and gold in the Women's European Team Chess Championship in Novi Sad. Guseva competed in the Women's World Chess Championship in 2010, 2012, 2017 and 2018.

She won the women's open event at the Moscow Open (ru) for two consecutive years, in 2012 and 2013. Guseva won the Russian Women's Championship Higher League, the qualifier for the Russian Women's Superfinal, in 2015 and 2017.

In the European Chess Club Cup for Women, playing for team Ugra, Guseva won the individual gold medal as the best player on board 4 in 2014.
