= Sergey Okrugin =

Russian chess International Master (born 1963)

Personal information
- Full name: Sergey Konstantinovich Okrugin
- Born: January 1, 1963 (age 63) Yaroslavl, Russia

Chess career
- Country: Soviet Union; Russia
- Title: International Master (2009)
- FIDE rating: 2319 (September 2021)
- Peak rating: 2404 (July 2002)

Sergey Konstantinovich Okrugin (Russian: Сергей Константинович Округин; born January 1, 1963, in Yaroslavl) is a Russian chess player who holds the FIDE title of International Master (2009).

== Chess career ==
Okrugin is one of the strongest chess players in Yaroslavl. In 1992 he won Open Latvian Chess Championship in Riga. In 1999 Sergey Okrugin participated in Russian Chess Championship in Moscow. In 2010 he participated in tournament in honor of the Yaroslavl's millennium. In 2011 Sergey Okrugin won silver medal in Yaroslavl Oblast Championship.

== Chess trainer ==
Okrugin is a chess trainer in Yaroslavl's children and youth sport school.
