= Aleksey Goganov =

Russian chess grandmaster (born 1991)

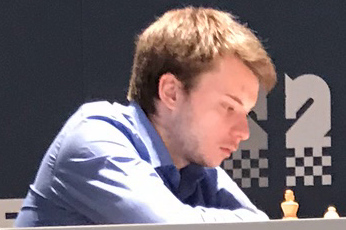
- Karlsruhe 2019

Personal information
- Born: 26 July 1991 (age 34) Saint Petersburg, Russian SFSR, Soviet Union

Chess career
- Country: Russia
- Title: Grandmaster (2013)
- FIDE rating: 2491 (July 2026)
- Peak rating: 2643 (November 2016)

Aleksey Goganov (Russian: Алексей Гоганов; born 26 July 1991) is a Russian chess player. He was awarded the title Grandmaster (GM) by FIDE in 2013. Goganov competed in the FIDE World Cup in 2015 and 2017.

== Chess career ==
Goganov is twice champion of Saint Petersburg: 2008 and 2016. He won the Lev Polugaevsky Memorial in 2012 on tiebreak, won the Chepukaitis Memorial in August 2013 and qualified for the Russian Chess Championship Superfinal in 2013, eventually finishing in eighth place. In 2016, Goganov shared first place in the Riga Technical University Open in Riga with Martyn Kravtsiv (the eventual winner on tiebreak score), Hrant Melkumyan, Arturs Neikšāns and Jiří Štoček.

In 2018 Aleksey Goganov had joined Mednyi Vsadnik group which came 4th place at the Euro Club Cup.

He won the ChessMood Open 2021, held at Tsaghkadzor from 4-12 October.
