= Konstantin Aseev =

Russian chess grandmaster and writer (1960–2004)

Personal information
- Born: October 20, 1960 Novokuznetsk, Soviet Union
- Died: August 22, 2004 (aged 43) Saint Petersburg, Russia

Chess career
- Country: Soviet Union (until 1991); Russia (after 1991)
- Title: Grandmaster (1992)
- Peak rating: 2591 (July 2001)
- Peak ranking: No. 47 (July 1990)

Konstantin Aseev (October 20, 1960 – August 22, 2004) was a Russian chess Grandmaster and trainer.

Among his tournament successes were first at Leningrad 1989 with 9/13 (beating Leonid Yudasin and Alexander Khalifman among others) and second to Sergei Tiviakov in the 1992 Alekhine Memorial in Moscow with 6/9 (ahead of Vladimir Kramnik (whom he beat), Mikhail Gurevich, Vladimir Akopian and many others). He participated in many Soviet and Russian Championships, and played in the FIDE World Championship in 2001 (but was knocked out by Mikhail Kobalia in the first round). His last tournament was in St Petersburg in October 2003 where he scored 5.5/9. His final FIDE Elo rating was 2511; his peak Elo rating was 2591 in July 2001.

Among the players Aseev trained are Maya Chiburdanidze, Andrei Kharlov and Evgeny Alekseev.

Aseev died in St Petersburg after a long battle with cancer on August 22, 2004, a rapid tournament in memory of Aseev was held in St. Petersburg, won by Evgeny Alekseev on tie break from Peter Svidler. All proceeds from the event went to Aseev's family. The memorial tournament was also held in 2016.
