= 78th Russian Chess Championship =

Tournament information
- Location: Moscow, Russia
- Date: 1–12 October 2025
- Format: Single Round-robin (11 rounds); Time Control; 90 min / 40 moves + 30 min + 30" increment (from move 1)
- Venue: Central Chess Club
- Participants: 12 (open) + 12 (women)

Final positions
- Champion: Open: Arseniy Nesterov; Women: Anna Shukhman

The 78th Russian Chess Championship (Russian: 78-й чемпионат России по шахматам), also known as the Superfinal of the 78th Russian Championship, was a chess tournament held in Moscow, Russia. It took place at the Central Chess Club and ran from 30 September to 13 October 2025, with the 11 rounds played from 1 to 12 October (rest day on 7 October). Games started at 3 PM Moscow time.

Arseniy Nesterov won his first Russian Championship title with 6½/11 points, remaining undefeated (+2 =9).

The 75th Russian Women's Chess Championship was held concurrently as a separate 11-round round-robin.

== Open section ==
=== Crosstable ===
Pos	Player	Title	Fed	Rating	1	2	3	4	5	6	7	8	9	10	11	12	Pts	TPR
1	Arseniy Nesterov	GM	FID	2584	*	½	½	½	½	½	½	1	½	1	½	½	6½	2654
2	Daniil Dubov	GM	RUS	2684	½	*	½	½	½	½	½	½	1	½	½	½	6	2616
3	Andrey Esipenko	GM	RUS	2693	½	½	*	½	½	½	1	½	½	½	½	½	6	2615
4	Vadim Zvjaginsev	GM	RUS	2528	½	½	½	*	½	1	½	½	½	½	½	½	6	2630
5	Vladislav Artemiev	GM	RUS	2646	½	½	½	½	*	½	½	½	½	½	0	1	5½	2583
6	Pavel Ponkratov	GM	RUS	2586	½	½	½	0	½	*	½	1	½	½	0	1	5½	2589
7	Vladimir Malakhov	GM	FID	2643	½	½	0	½	½	½	*	0	1	½	1	½	5½	2584
8	Savva Vetokhin	GM	FID	2569	0	½	½	½	½	0	1	*	½	½	1	½	5½	2590
9	Artem Uskov	GM	FID	2498	½	0	½	½	½	½	0	½	*	½	1	1	5½	2597
10	Ilia Iljiushenok	GM	FID	2514	0	½	½	½	½	½	½	½	½	*	½	½	5	2559
11	Ivan Zemlyanskii	GM	RUS	2596	½	½	½	½	1	1	0	0	0	½	*	0	4½	2523
12	Sergei Lobanov	GM	FID	2526	½	½	½	½	0	0	½	½	0	½	1	*	4½	2529

== Schedule and results by round ==
The tournament was contested as a single round-robin over 11 rounds with one rest day. All rounds started at 15:00 Moscow time.

=== Open section ===
Round 1 (1 October 2025)

White	Black	Result	Moves	ECO	Opening
Nesterov, Arseniy	Iljiushenok, Ilia	1–0	37	D38	QGD Ragozin
Dubov, Daniil	Lobanov, Sergei	½–½	41	A05	Various
Esipenko, Andrey	Artemiev, Vladislav	½–½	41	C50	Giuoco Piano
Zvjaginsev, Vadim	Vetokhin, Savva	½–½	26	A00	Irregular Openings
Ponkratov, Pavel	Malakhov, Vladimir	½–½	15	C45	Scotch Game
Zemlyanskii, Ivan	Uskov, Artem	0–1	67	C60	Ruy Lopez

Round 2 (2 October 2025)

White	Black	Result	Moves	ECO	Opening
Zvjaginsev, Vadim	Ponkratov, Pavel	1–0	41	C47	Four Knights
Malakhov, Vladimir	Zemlyanskii, Ivan	1–0	39	A05	Various
Vetokhin, Savva	Artemiev, Vladislav	½–½	47	D30	Queen's Gambit
Uskov, Artem	Nesterov, Arseniy	½–½	34	A08	Barcza System
Iljiushenok, Ilia	Dubov, Daniil	½–½	40	D90	Grünfeld
Lobanov, Sergei	Esipenko, Andrey	½–½	51	D31	Semi-Slav Defence

Round 3 (3 October 2025)

White	Black	Result	Moves	ECO	Opening
Nesterov, Arseniy	Malakhov, Vladimir	½–½	33	D11	Slav Defence
Dubov, Daniil	Uskov, Artem	1–0	80	A05	Various
Esipenko, Andrey	Iljiushenok, Ilia	½–½	40	C42	Petroff's Defence
Artemiev, Vladislav	Lobanov, Sergei	1–0	50	D38	QGD Ragozin
Ponkratov, Pavel	Vetokhin, Savva	1–0	37	C92	Ruy Lopez Chigorin
Zemlyanskii, Ivan	Zvjaginsev, Vadim	½–½	64	A30	English Symmetrical

Round 4 (4 October 2025)

White	Black	Result	Moves	ECO	Opening
Zvjaginsev, Vadim	Nesterov, Arseniy	½–½	19	C01	French Exchange
Ponkratov, Pavel	Zemlyanskii, Ivan	0–1	49	C88	Ruy Lopez Closed
Malakhov, Vladimir	Dubov, Daniil	½–½	26	A49	King's Indian
Vetokhin, Savva	Lobanov, Sergei	½–½	41	D30	Queen's Gambit
Uskov, Artem	Esipenko, Andrey	½–½	40	A13	Réti Opening
Iljiushenok, Ilia	Artemiev, Vladislav	½–½	40	D36	QGD Exchange

Round 5 (5 October 2025)

White	Black	Result	Moves	ECO	Opening
Nesterov, Arseniy	Ponkratov, Pavel	½–½	27	D86	Grünfeld Simagin
Dubov, Daniil	Zvjaginsev, Vadim	½–½	42	C67	Ruy Lopez Berlin
Esipenko, Andrey	Malakhov, Vladimir	1–0	38	C53	Giuoco Piano
Artemiev, Vladislav	Uskov, Artem	½–½	41	A29	English Four Knights
Zemlyanskii, Ivan	Vetokhin, Savva	0–1	45	E06	Catalan
Lobanov, Sergei	Iljiushenok, Ilia	½–½	41	A33	English Symmetrical

Round 6 (6 October 2025)

White	Black	Result	Moves	ECO	Opening
Zvjaginsev, Vadim	Esipenko, Andrey	½–½	40	B30	Sicilian Rossolimo
Ponkratov, Pavel	Dubov, Daniil	½–½	47	D33	Tarrasch Defence
Malakhov, Vladimir	Artemiev, Vladislav	½–½	31	A06	Zukertort Opening
Vetokhin, Savva	Iljiushenok, Ilia	½–½	50	E60	King's Indian
Uskov, Artem	Lobanov, Sergei	1–0	61	C50	Giuoco Piano
Zemlyanskii, Ivan	Nesterov, Arseniy	½–½	41	C42	Petroff's Defence

Round 7 (8 October 2025)

White	Black	Result	Moves	ECO	Opening
Nesterov, Arseniy	Vetokhin, Savva	1–0	41	E06	Catalan Opening
Dubov, Daniil	Zemlyanskii, Ivan	½–½	41	A16	English Opening
Esipenko, Andrey	Ponkratov, Pavel	½–½	68	B90	Sicilian Najdorf
Artemiev, Vladislav	Zvjaginsev, Vadim	½–½	60	D31	Semi-Slav Defence
Iljiushenok, Ilia	Uskov, Artem	½–½	42	E21	Nimzo-Indian Defence
Lobanov, Sergei	Malakhov, Vladimir	½–½	39	D15	Slav Defence

Round 8 (9 October 2025)

White	Black	Result	Moves	ECO	Opening
Nesterov, Arseniy	Dubov, Daniil	½–½	37	A41	Modern Defence
Zvjaginsev, Vadim	Lobanov, Sergei	½–½	27	C47	Four Knights Game
Ponkratov, Pavel	Artemiev, Vladislav	½–½	63	C67	Ruy Lopez Berlin Defence
Malakhov, Vladimir	Iljiushenok, Ilia	½–½	40	A38	English Opening
Vetokhin, Savva	Uskov, Artem	½–½	32	E17	Queen's Indian Defence
Zemlyanskii, Ivan	Esipenko, Andrey	½–½	33	D31	Semi-Slav Defence

Round 9 (10 October 2025)

White	Black	Result	Moves	ECO	Opening
Dubov, Daniil	Vetokhin, Savva	½–½	44	A00	Irregular Opening
Esipenko, Andrey	Nesterov, Arseniy	½–½	51	C42	Petroff's Defence
Artemiev, Vladislav	Zemlyanskii, Ivan	0–1	71	A34	English Opening
Uskov, Artem	Malakhov, Vladimir	0–1	54	A07	Barcza System
Iljiushenok, Ilia	Zvjaginsev, Vadim	½–½	30	C45	Scotch Game
Lobanov, Sergei	Ponkratov, Pavel	0–1	68	A29	English Four Knights

Round 10 (11 October 2025)

White	Black	Result	Moves	ECO	Opening
Nesterov, Arseniy	Artemiev, Vladislav	½–½	47	D38	QGD Ragozin
Dubov, Daniil	Esipenko, Andrey	½–½	41	D31	Semi-Slav Defence
Zvjaginsev, Vadim	Uskov, Artem	½–½	21	A20	English Opening
Ponkratov, Pavel	Iljiushenok, Ilia	½–½	41	A33	English Symmetrical
Vetokhin, Savva	Malakhov, Vladimir	1–0	68	D00	Queen's Pawn Game
Zemlyanskii, Ivan	Lobanov, Sergei	0–1	39	C53	Giuoco Piano

Round 11 (12 October 2025)

White	Black	Result	Moves	ECO	Opening
Esipenko, Andrey	Vetokhin, Savva	½–½	36	D35	QGD Exchange Variation
Artemiev, Vladislav	Dubov, Daniil	½–½	42	D31	Semi-Slav Defence
Malakhov, Vladimir	Zvjaginsev, Vadim	½–½	28	A49	King's Indian Defence
Uskov, Artem	Ponkratov, Pavel	½–½	45	A13	Réti Opening
Iljiushenok, Ilia	Zemlyanskii, Ivan	½–½	52	E60	King's Indian Defence
Lobanov, Sergei	Nesterov, Arseniy	½–½	33	D38	QGD Ragozin

Nesterov remained undefeated throughout the event and secured the title in the final round.

== Women's section ==
The 75th Russian Women's Chess Championship was held concurrently in Moscow with the same schedule and format (11 rounds, 12 players). Anna Shukhman (aged 16, WGM) won the title with 7/10 points, half a point ahead of Leya Garifullina and Daria Charochkina. Shukhman secured victory by defeating Garifullina in the final round (the first game to finish that round). Alisa Galliamova withdrew around the halfway stage due to health reasons, and her results were annulled.

=== Crosstable ===
Rk	Player	Title	Fed	1	2	3	4	5	6	7	8	9	10	11	12	Pts
1	Anna Shukhman	WGM	RUS	*	1	½	½	½	½	0	1	1	1	1	(+)	7
2	Leya Garifullina	IM	RUS	0	*	1	½	1	1	1	0	1	½	½	-1	6.5
3	Daria Charochkina	IM	RUS	½	0	*	1	1	0	½	1	½	1	1	-1	6.5
4	Polina Shuvalova	IM	RUS	½	½	0	*	0	½	1	½	1	1	1	(+)	6
5	Ekaterina Goltseva	WGM	RUS	½	0	0	1	*	½	½	½	1	½	1	(+)	5.5
6	Ekaterina Kovalevskaya	IM	RUS	½	0	1	½	½	*	0	½	½	½	1	(½)	5
7	Anastasia Bodnaruk	IM	RUS	1	0	½	0	½	1	*	0	1	½	0	(+)	4.5
8	Olga Girya	GM	RUS	0	1	0	½	½	½	1	*	0	0	1	(+)	4.5
9	Valentina Gunina	GM	RUS	0	0	½	0	0	½	0	1	*	1	1	-1	4
10	Margarita Potapova	WIM	RUS	0	½	0	0	½	½	½	1	0	*	½	-1	3.5
11	Yana Zhapova	WGM	RUS	0	½	0	0	0	0	1	0	0	½	*	(+)	2
12	Alisa Galliamova	IM	RUS	(-)	0	0	(-)	(-)	(½)	(-)	(-)	0	0	(-)	*	0

Note: (+) and (-) notations reflect adjustments due to Galliamova's withdrawal.

== Prize fund ==
The total prize fund for the superfinals was 11 million RUB. Each Russian champion (open and women's) received a LADA car from JSC AvtoVAZ, the official automobile partner of the event.

== Organization ==
The tournament was organized by the Chess Federation of Russia with support from the Ministry of Sports of the Russian Federation.
