= Elena Tairova =

Belarusian-Russian chess player (1991–2010)

Personal information
- Born: 28 August 1991 Minsk, Belarusian SSR, Soviet Union
- Died: 16 March 2010 (aged 18) Minsk, Belarus

Chess career
- Country: Belarus; Russia
- Title: International Master (2007); Woman Grandmaster (2006)
- Peak rating: 2455 (November 2009)
- Peak ranking: No. 34 woman (July 2009)

Elena Tairova (Russian: Елена Таирова; Belarusian: Алена Таірава, romanized: Alena Tairava; 28 August 1991 – 16 March 2010) was a Belarusian and Russian chess player. She was awarded the FIDE titles of Woman Grandmaster (WGM) in 2006 and International Master (IM) in 2007.

== Biography ==
Tairova won the gold medal at the European Youth Chess Championships in the Girls U10 category in 2001, playing for Belarus, and the World Youth Chess Championships in the Girls U14 section in 2005, representing Russia. She was the silver medallist in the European Youth Championships in the Girls U12 category in 2003 and the Girls U14 in 2004. Also in 2004, Tairova won the bronze medal at the World Youth Championships in the Girls U14 category.

In 2006, she won the Russian U-20 girls championship and finished second in the Superfinal of the Russian women's championship.

In May 2007, Tairova played board five for the Russian team that won the silver medal in the 1st Women's World Team Chess Championship in Yekaterinburg. In July 2007, she finished third in the Queens Woman Grandmasters tournament in Bad Homburg, behind Zhao Xue and Elisabeth Pähtz respectively. In the same year, she participated in the Russia vs China match and tied for first at the Russian Women's Superfinal, beating Nadezhda Kosintseva, among others.

On 16 March 2010, Tairova died from a chronic undisclosed illness at the age of 18.
