= Elena Zaiatz =

Russian chess player (born 1969)

Personal information
- Full name: Elena Evgenievna Zaiatz
- Born: 16 June 1969 (age 57) Baranovichi

Chess career
- Country: Soviet Union; Belarus; Russia
- Title: International Master (2005); Woman Grandmaster (1988)
- FIDE rating: 2336 (June 2019)
- Peak rating: 2449 (July 2012)

Elena Evgenievna Zaiatz (Russian: Елена Евгеньевна Заяц, also transliterated Zayats, Zayac, etc.; born 16 June 1969) is a Russian female chess player who holds the FIDE titles of International Master (2005) and Woman Grandmaster (1988). She has represented both Belarus and Russia at the international chess competitions. Elena Zaiatz represented Belarus in chess championships from 1986 to 2006 before heading to Russia. She went on to represent Russia at chess championships from 2007 to date. She graduated at the Belarusian State University.

Elena has represented Belarus at Chess Olympiads from 1994 to 1996. She went onto represent Russia at the 2006 Chess World Championship. Elena was a Belarusian National Chess Champion in 1988 and also won a bronze medal in the World U20 Chess Championship held in 1988.

== See also ==
- List of female chess players
