= Konstantin Sakaev =

Russian chess grandmaster (born 1974)

Personal information
- Born: April 13, 1974 (age 52) Leningrad, Soviet Union

Chess career
- Country: Soviet Union; Russia
- Title: Grandmaster (1993)
- FIDE rating: 2535 (July 2026)
- Peak rating: 2677 (January 2005)
- Peak ranking: No. 26 (January 2005)

Konstantin Rufovich Sakaev (Russian: Константи́н Ру́фович Сака́ев; born 13 April 1974 in Leningrad) is a Russian chess Grandmaster (1993), chess author and Russian champion in 1999. Sakaev is on the staff of the Grandmaster Chess School in St. Petersburg and has assisted Vladimir Kramnik and Nana Ioseliani in preparing for World Championship Candidates' Matches.

== Notable results ==
- Under-16 World Champion 1990
- USSR Youth Champion 1990
- Leningrad Champion 1990
- U18 World Champion 1992
- Russian Champion 1999
- Olympic champion with the Russian team in 1998 and 2000
- 16th in the 2005 FIDE World Cup.

== Works ==
- Sakaev, Konstantin (2004). How to Get the Edge Against the Gruenfeld. Chess Stars. ISBN 978-9548782357.
- Sakaev, Konstantin; Semkov, Semko (2005). Latest Trends in the Semi-Slav: Anti-Meran. Chess Stars. ISBN 978-9548782425.
- Sakaev, Konstantin (2006). An Expert's Guide to the 7.Bc4 Gruenfeld. Chess Stars. ISBN 978-9548782487.
- Sakaev, Konstantin; Semkov, Semko (2008). The Queen's Gambit Accepted (3rd ed.). Chess Stars. ISBN 978-9548782333.
- Sakaev, Konstantin (2011). The Petroff: an Expert Repertoire for Black. Chess Stars. ISBN 978-954-8782-84-5.
- Sakaev, Konstantin (2012). Complete Slav I. Chess Evolution. ISBN 978-83-934656-3-7.
- Sakaev, Konstantin (2013). Complete Slav II. Chess Evolution. ISBN 978-83-937009-2-9.

Sporting positions
Preceded by Alexander Morozevich	Russian Chess Champion; 1999	Succeeded by Sergey Volkov
