= Dmitry Kokarev (chess player) =

Russian chess grandmaster (born 1982)

Personal information
- Born: 18 February 1982 (age 44) Penza, Russian SFSR, Soviet Union

Chess career
- Country: Russia
- Title: Grandmaster (2007)
- FIDE rating: 2523 (August 2026)
- Peak rating: 2651 (January 2017)

Dmitry Nikolaevich Kokarev (Russian: Дмитрий Кокарев; born 18 February 1982 in Penza) is a Russian chess Grandmaster.

== Chess career ==
Kokarev won the U-18 section of the World Youth Chess Championship in 1999 in Oropesa del Mar, Spain. In 2009, he tied for 1st–8th with Sergey Volkov, Igor Lysyj, Aleksandr Rakhmanov, Valerij Popov, Denis Khismatullin, Dmitry Andreikin and Dmitry Bocharov in the Voronezh Open tournament. In 2010, he won the Mumbai Mayor's Cup chess tournament and tied for 1st–6th with Maxim Turov, Alexey Dreev, Martyn Kravtsiv, Baskaran Adhiban and Aleksej Aleksandrov in the 2nd Orissa Open tournament in Bhubaneshwar. In 2013 Kokarev won the Dvorkovich Memorial in Taganrog and sharing first at the Chigorin Memorial in Saint Petersburg, finishing second on tiebreak score. In 2014 he won the 10th Ugra Governor's Cup in Khanty-Mansiysk. Kokarev played for Novosibirsk's team "Siberia" which won both the Russian Team Chess Championship Premiere League and the European Club Cup in 2015.

== Notable games ==
- Dmitry Kokarev vs Teimour Radjabov, Wch U18 1999, Formation: King's Indian Attack (A07) 1-0
- Dmitry Kokarev vs Ratmir Kholmov, White Nights 2001, Caro-Kann Defense: Finnish Variation (B16) 1-0
