= Andrei Shchekachev =

Russian-French chess grandmaster (born 1972)

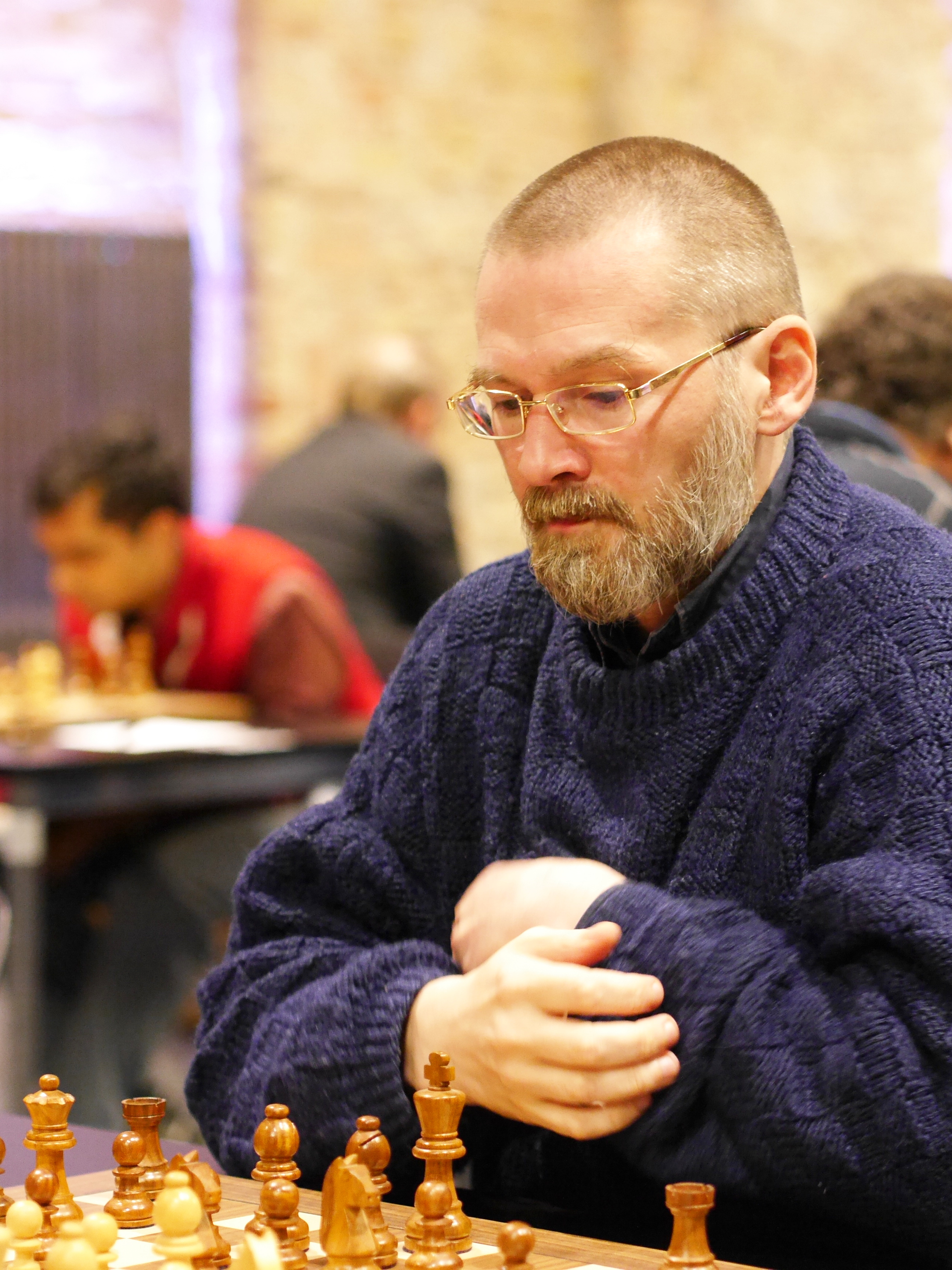
- Shchekachev in 2015

Personal information
- Born: October 27, 1972 (age 53)

Chess career
- Country: Soviet Union (until 1992); Russia (1992–2007); France (since 2007)
- Title: Grandmaster (1996)
- FIDE rating: 2449 (July 2026)
- Peak rating: 2593 (July 2006)

Andrei Shchekachev (Russian: Андрей Щекачёв) is a Russian chess grandmaster who plays for France.

== Chess career ==
In June 2023, he won the French Open Rapid Championships with a score of 8.5/9, ahead of runner-up Sergey Fedorchuk.

In July 2023, he tied for second place in the 96th Paris IdF Masters 2023, alongside Harshavardhan G. B., Karthik Venkataraman, and Aarav Dengla.

In December 2023, he was one of the three grandmasters who played against Alireza Firouzja in his "Race to the Candidates" tournament, the others being Alexandre Dgebuadze and Sergey Fedorchuk.
