= Tatiana Shadrina =

Russian chess player (born 1974)

Personal information
- Born: 20 April 1974 (age 52) Kstovo, Soviet Union

Chess career
- Country: Russia
- Title: Woman Grandmaster (1999)
- FIDE rating: 2320 (February 2015)
- Peak rating: 2431 (April 2009)

Tatiana Shadrina (born 20 April 1974 in Kstovo) is a Russian chess player, and a woman grandmaster.

She played in the Women's World Chess Championship 2010, she made it to the second round where she was beaten by Harika Dronavalli.

She has played in the Women's European Individual Chess Championship in 2009 and 2013.
