= Daria Charochkina =

Russian chess player

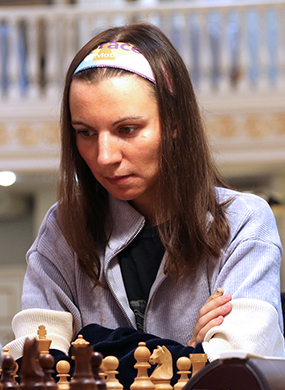
- Daria Charochkina in 2019

Personal information
- Born: October 7, 1990 (age 35)

Chess career
- Country: Russia
- Title: International Master (2015); Woman Grandmaster (2011)
- Peak rating: 2411 (May 2014)

Daria Charochkina (born October 7, 1990) is a Russian chess player, and a woman grandmaster.

She qualified for the Women's World Chess Championship 2017, but was defeated by Huang Qian in the first round.
