= Maxim Sorokin =

Russian chess grandmaster (1968–2007)

Personal information
- Born: January 22, 1968 Izhevsk, Soviet Union
- Died: June 30, 2007 (aged 39) Elista, Russia

Chess career
- Country: Russia; Argentina (1998–2002)
- Title: Grandmaster (1992)
- Peak rating: 2599 (April 2005)

Maxim Sorokin (22 January 1968 – 30 June 2007) was a Russian chess Grandmaster (GM) since 1992. In 1998–2002 he played for Argentina.

== Individual results ==
His first big results Sorokin accomplished end of the 1980s. In 1989 he took shared 2nd place in Sotchi, in 1990 he earned the bronze medal in Minsk, at the USSR championship for players under 26 years of age, the Tournament of young Sovjet masters. In 1991 he became 3rd at the RSFSR championship. In 1991 he became shared first in Belgorod at the qualification tournament for the last USSR championship in Moscow. In 1992, the year in which the FIDE gave him the title grandmaster (GM), he became shared 2nd, together with among others Sergei Rublevsky, in Ostrava. In 1993 he won the tournament in San Fernando, Buenos Aires (together with among others Óscar Panno) and won the tournament in San Martín, Argentina, (above among others Vasili Smyslov). In 1996 in Villa Ballester he became second, behind Andrés Rodríguez Vila. Also in 1996 in Elista he became shared fourth (with Evgeny Bareev and Vadim Zvjaginsev) at the Russian chess championship. In 1997 Sorokin became first in Villa Martelli and second (behind Pablo Ricardi) at the Clarín tournament in Villa Gesell, Buenos Aires. The result in Villa Gesell was one year later repeated by Sorokin. In 1998 he made his debut at the Argentina championship and achieved finishing at third place. Also in 1998, he won in Buenos Aires the Boca Juniors Open. In 1999 there were more successes: shared second (with Alexei Dreev and Viktor Bologan) at the Anibal Open in Linares, and in Calcutta (with Sergey Dolmatov and Jaan Ehlvest) and also in Krasnodar (with Pavel Tregubov).

In 2000 he became shared first at the Chigorin-Memorial in Saint Petersburg and at the Commonwealth Chess Championship, held in Sangli. In the years after, his international successes became less, although in many tournaments he still ended up in the higher part of the endresult list; for example: Calcutta (2001, 7½ / 11), Dubai (2002, 6 / 9), Sankt Petersburg (2002, 6 / 9), Linares (2002, 6½ / 10), Bombay (2003, 7 / 10), Uralsk (2003, 7 / 10), Cappelle-la-Grande (2004, 6 / 9), Salekhard (2004, 7 / 9), Moscow (2005, Aeroflot Open, 6 / 9), Linares (2005, 6½ / 9), Cappelle-la-Grande (2006, 6 / 9), Tomsk (2006, 6 / 9), Tsjeljabinsk (2006, 6 / 9) and Nizhny Tagil (2007, 6 / 9).

In 2004 he tied for first with Saidali Iuldachev in the Murzagaliev Memorial in Uralsk, Kazakhstan.

In April 2005 his Elo-rating was 2599.

In 2007 he coached Sergei Rublevsky in the 2007 Candidates matches in Elista.

== Chess teams ==
In 1991 he won gold with the national Sovjet student team at the world championship for students in Maringá, Brazil, where he also received an individual gold medal for the best result at board 5.

== Death ==
Sorokin died at June 30th, 2007 in a hospital in Elista, after he got on the way from Elista to Volgograd involved in a car accident, where became heavily wounded.
