= Alexander Rustemov =

Russian chess grandmaster (born 1973)

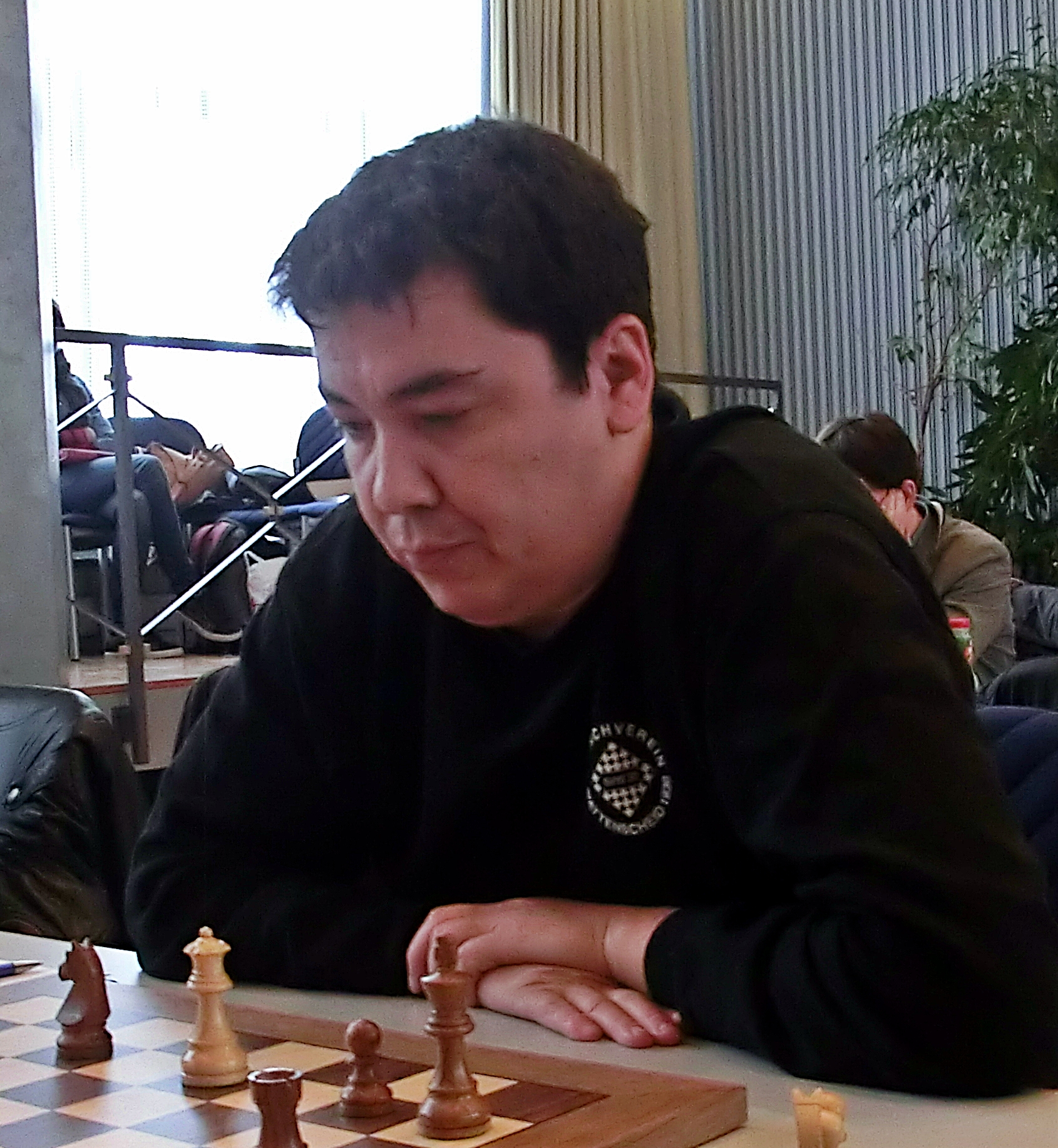

Personal information
- Born: July 6, 1973 (age 53) Murmansk, Soviet Union

Chess career
- Country: Russia
- Title: Grandmaster (1998)
- FIDE rating: 2525 (November 2026)
- Peak rating: 2625 (April 2001)
- Peak ranking: No. 61 (April 2001)

Alexander Rustemov (Russian: Александр Рустемов; born July 6, 1973) is a Russian chess grandmaster and trainer. He gained the grandmaster title in 1998 and finished second in the 2000 Russian Chess Championship. Rustemov is an experienced internet blitz player, having played the Dutch grandmaster Loek van Wely in a 137-game blitz match on the ICC, the final score of which was 67½–71½ to van Wely. He is part of the Schachverein Wattenscheid chess club. In recent years, Rustemov has been living in Belarus.
