= Andrei Kharlov =

Russian chess grandmaster (1968–2014)

Personal information
- Born: Andrei Vasilyevich Kharlov; November 20, 1968 Prokopyevsk, Kemerovo Oblast, Soviet Union
- Died: June 15, 2014 (aged 45) Kazan, Tatarstan, Russia

Chess career
- Country: Russia
- Title: Grandmaster (1992)
- Peak rating: 2656 (July 2001)
- Peak ranking: No. 31 (July 2001)

Andrei Vasilyevich Kharlov (Russian: Андрей Васильевич Ха́рлов; November 20, 1968 – June 15, 2014) was a Russian chess grandmaster.

== Tournament results ==
In 1992, he received the title of Grandmaster after tying for first place in the 1990 Russian Championship. Since then, Kharlov has won the 1996 European Club Cup and the 1998 Russian Club Cup with the Kazan chess team. In 2000, he tied for second in the Russian National Championship in Samara and tied for first in the European Individual Chess Championship in Saint-Vincent. He participated in the FIDE World Chess Championship 2000, where he was knocked out by Veselin Topalov in the second round. In the FIDE World Chess Championship 2004 he advanced to the fifth round (final eight), but was again knocked out by Topalov. In 2005 he ended shared first in the Aeroflot Open, only to lose the title on tie-break.

== Death ==
Kharlov's death was announced by the Russian Chess Federation on June 15, 2014; no cause of death was provided. He had played in a tournament in Kazan the previous week.

== Notable games ==
Kharlov vs. Ivanchuk, Moscow 2005

Position: c8 black rook, e7 white rook, f6 white king, h6 black king, e5 black rook, g5 black pawn, g4 white pawn, b3 white rook, f2 white pawn

Final position after 59.Kxf6. Black resigns.

In the 2005 Aeroflot Open Andrei Kharlov played Vassily Ivanchuk as white.

Andrei Kharlov–Vassily Ivanchuk, Aeroflot Open 2005
1.d4 d5 2.Nf3 c5 3.c3 a5 4.dxc5 Nf6 5.c4 e6 6.cxd5 Bxc5 7.Qc2 Bb4+ 8.Bd2 exd5 9.Bxb4 axb4 10.Nbd2 Nc6 11.Nb3 Bg4 12.g3 Rc8 13.Qd1 0-0 14.Bg2 Qb6 15.0-0 Rfd8 16.Qd2 h6 17.Rfd1 Ne4 18.Qe1 d4 19.Nc1 Nc5 20.Nd3 Nxd3 21.Rxd3 Ra8 22.Rd2 Ra5 23.Qd1 Be6 24.b3 Bf5 25.h3 Be4 26.Ne1 Bxg2 27.Kxg2 Rc5 28.Nf3 Rc3 29.Qb1 Qa5 30.Qe4 Rxb3 31.Rad1 Ra3 32.Nxd4 Qd5 33.Qxd5 Rxd5 34.Nb3 Re5 35.Rc2 Na5 36.Rd3 Re8 37.Rf3 Nc6 38.Rd3 Rea8 39.Rdd2 Na5 40.Nd4 b3 41.axb3 Nxb3 42.Nxb3 Rxb3 43.Rd7 Rb5 44.Rcc7 Rf8 45.Re7 b6 46.Rb7 Rc5 47.Rxb6 h5 48.Rb4 g6 49.Rf4 Kg7 50.e4 Rc4 51.Rf3 Ra4 52.g4 hxg4 53.hxg4 Kh6 54.Kg3 f6 55.Rb3 Rc8 56.Kf4!

A brilliant move by Kharlov. The game continued

56...g5+ 57.Kf5 Ra5+ 58.e5 Rxe5+ 59.Kxf6 1–0

when black cannot defend 60.Rh3# without losing material.
