= Roiz =

Roiz is a surname. Notable people with the surname include:

- Michael Roiz (born 1983), Israeli chess player
- Sasha Roiz (born 1973), Canadian actor
- Javier Roiz, Spanish political theorist
