= Mateusz Bartel =

Polish chess grandmaster (born 1985)

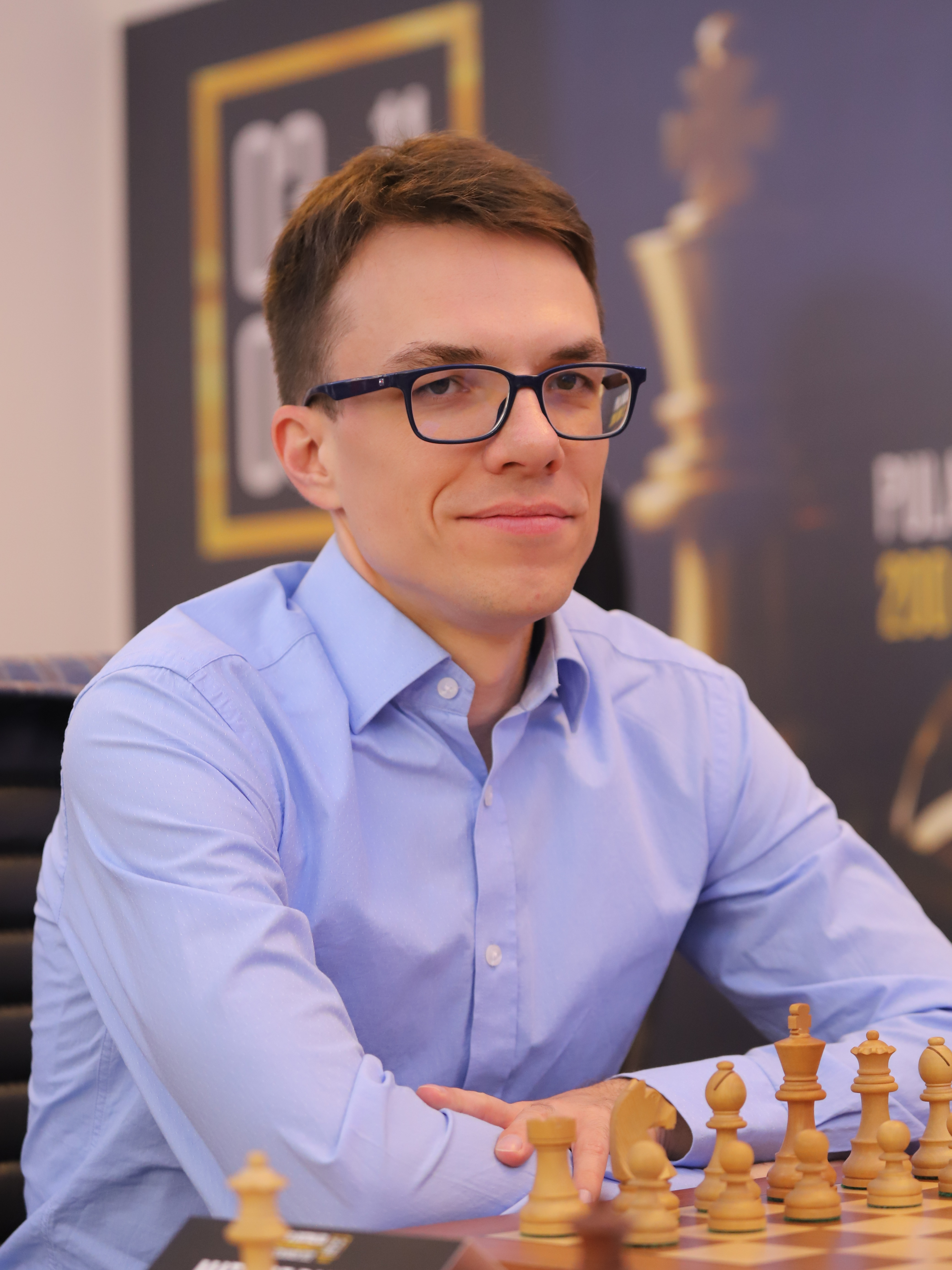
- Bartel in 2022

Personal information
- Born: 3 January 1985 (age 41) Warsaw, Poland
- Spouse: Marta Przeździecka (m. 2013)

Chess career
- Country: Poland
- Title: Grandmaster (2005)
- FIDE rating: 2549 (July 2026)
- Peak rating: 2677 (May 2012)
- Peak ranking: No. 73 (May 2012)

Mateusz Bartel (born 3 January 1985) is a Polish chess Grandmaster. He won the Polish Chess Championship in 2006, 2010, 2011 and 2012.

== Career ==
Bartel learnt to play the game at the age of 6 from his father when he and his younger brother were at home ill with chickenpox. Both Mateusz and his brother later entered the chess club "Polonia Warsaw".

He won the under-18 European championship in 2003. In 2005 Bartel finished equal first with Zoltan Gyimesi in the inaugural EU Individual Open Chess Championship in Cork.

In 2007, he tied for 1st–6th with Vitali Golod, Zahar Efimenko, Yuri Yakovich, Michael Roiz and Mikhail Kobalia in the 16th Monarch Assurance Isle of Man International tournament, as first on tie-break. In 2009 he came first at Prievidza.

In February 2012, Bartel tied for 1st–3rd with Anton Korobov and Pavel Eljanov in the 11th Aeroflot Open, winning the prestigious event on tie-break. In August 2017, Bartel won the traditional Open (Master Tournament) at the Biel Chess Festival (50th and jubilee edition), on tie-break above Vladimir Baklan.

He played for Czech team "G-Team Nový Bor" that won the 2013 European Chess Club Cup in Rhodes.

In 2015 Bartel won the bronze medal at the European Individual Championship in Jerusalem.

Bartel represented his country in the Chess Olympiad in 2006, 2008, 2010, 2012 and 2014. In the Turin 2006 Olympiad he played fourth board, scoring 5/10 (+3 =4 -3). In the Dresden 2008 Olympiad, Bartel scored 4/7 (+3 =2 -2) as the team's third board. In the Khanty-Mansiysk 2010 Olympiad he played on the fifth board scoring 7 points out of 9 games (+6 =2 -1) and got a silver medal for individual result on his board. After Sébastien Feller's disqualification for cheating, Bartel received the gold medal.

In May 2024, in Rzeszów he won bronze medal in Polish Chess Championship.
