= Nadezhda Kosintseva =

Russian chess grandmaster (born 1985)

Nadezhda Kosintseva Надежда Косинцева
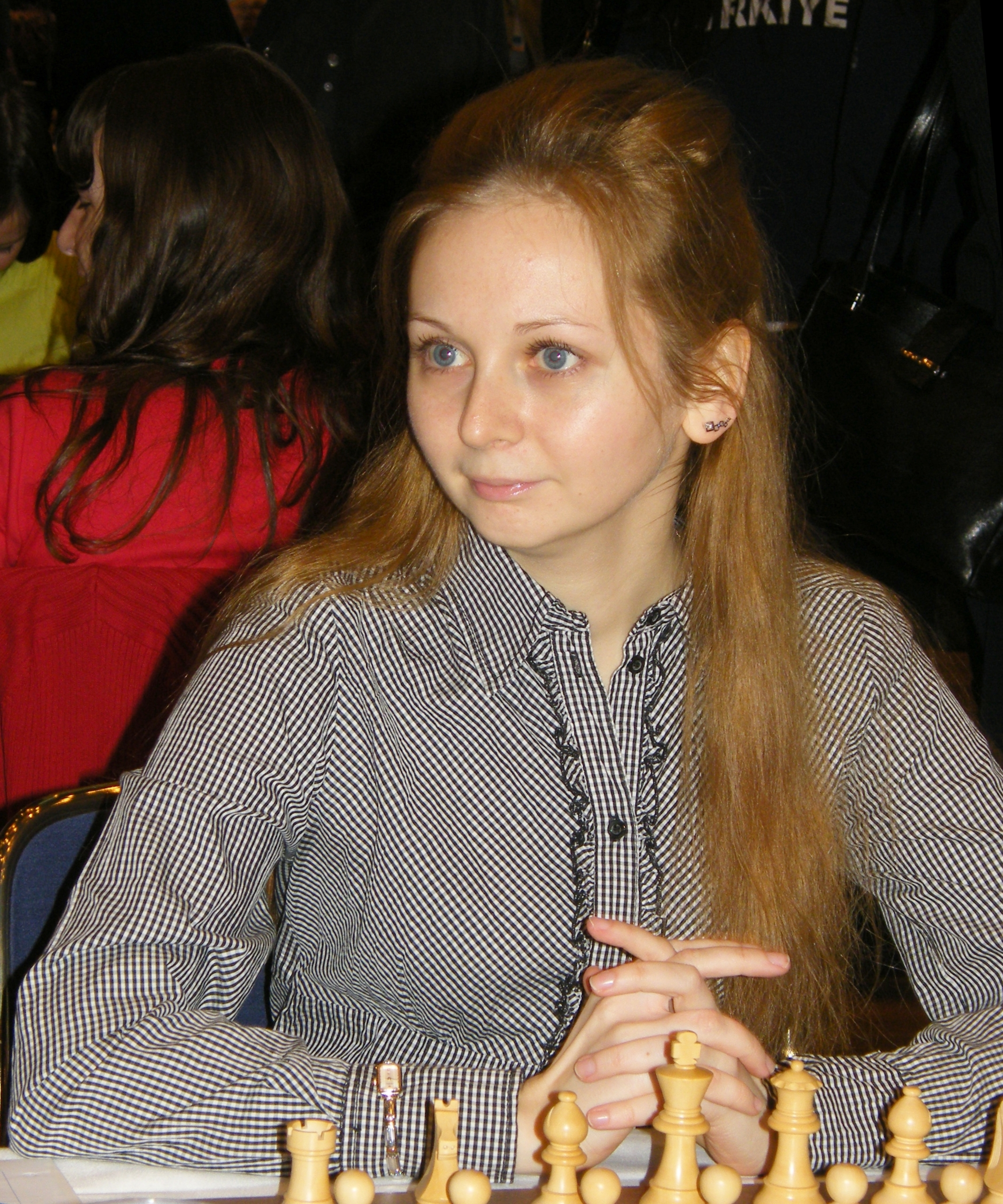
- Kosintseva at the Dresden Olympiad, 2008

Personal information
- Born: Nadezhda Anatolyevna Kosintseva; 14 January 1985 (age 41) Arkhangelsk, Russian SFSR, Soviet Union (now Russia)
- Spouse: Leonid Kritz (m. 2012; div. 2018)

Chess career
- Country: Russia
- Title: Grandmaster (2011)
- FIDE rating: 2483 (November 2026)
- Peak rating: 2576 (November 2010)

Nadezhda Anatolyevna Kosintseva (Russian: Надежда Анатольевна Косинцева; born 14 January 1985) is a Russian chess grandmaster. She was a member of the gold medal-winning Russian team in the Women's Chess Olympiads of 2010 and 2012, and in the Women's European Team Chess Championships of 2007, 2009 and 2011.

== Career ==
At the European Youth Chess Championship, Kosintseva took gold medals in 1995 (Girls Under-10, Verdun), 1997 (Girls Under-12, Tallinn, Estonia) and 2000 (Girls Under-18, Kallithea, Greece). At the World Youth Chess Championship of 1998, held in Oropesa del Mar, Spain, she took the gold medal in the Girls Under-14 event. She was twice the bronze medalist at the World Junior Chess Championship (Girls, Under-20) in 2001 and 2002.

In 2005, she tied for first place with Kateryna Lahno in the European Individual Women's Championship, held in Chișinău, Moldova. Kosintseva took the silver medal after losing the playoff match. In the 2007 edition of the same event she won the bronze medal.

In 2006, along with younger sister Tatiana and Elena Tairova, she shared second place at the Russian women's championship superfinal. Kosintseva won the 2008 Russian women's championship in Moscow. She finished second in this event in 2009.

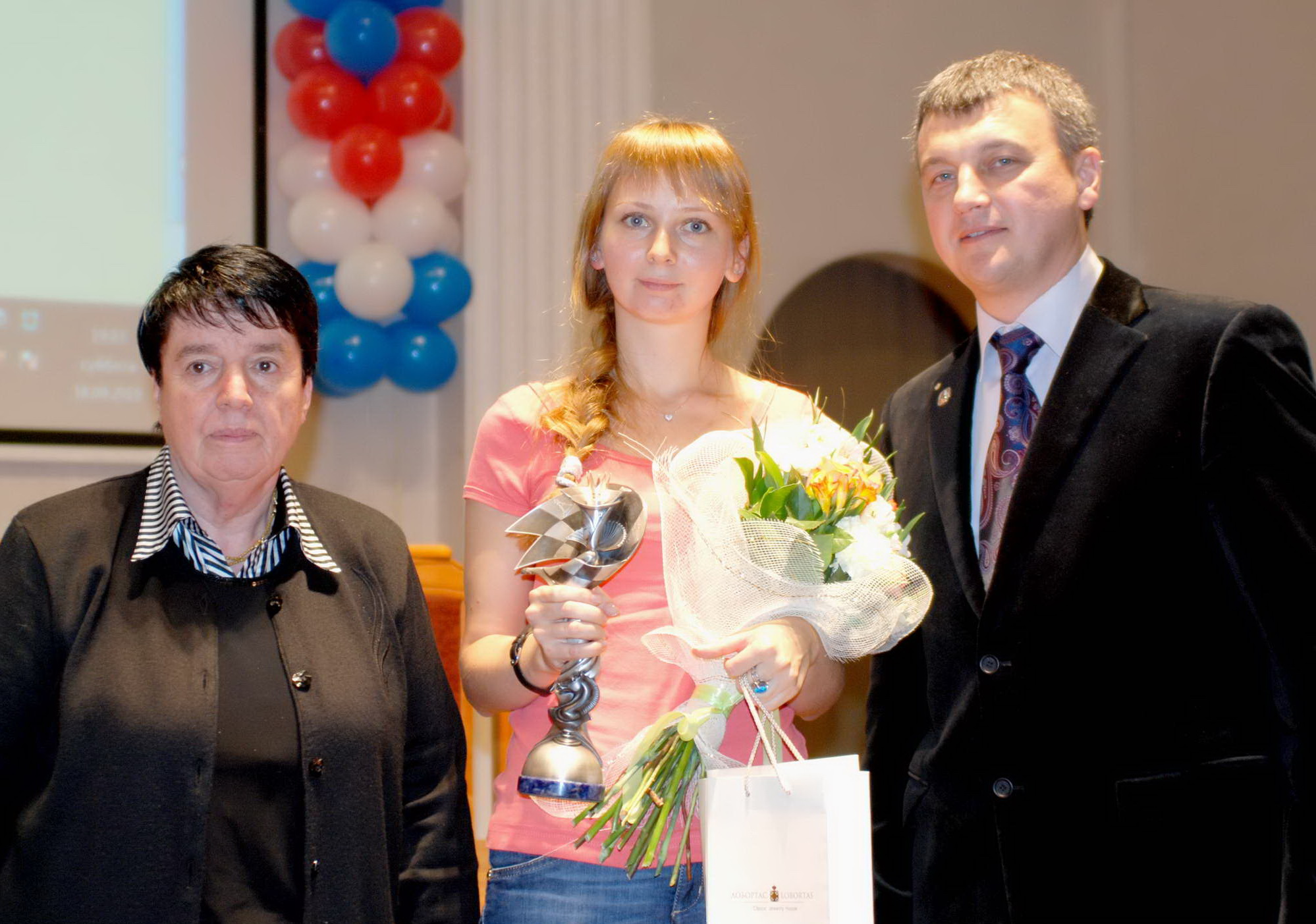
Hand-over of the Caissa Chess Award to Nadezhda Kosintseva by Nona Gaprindashvili and Igor Lobortas

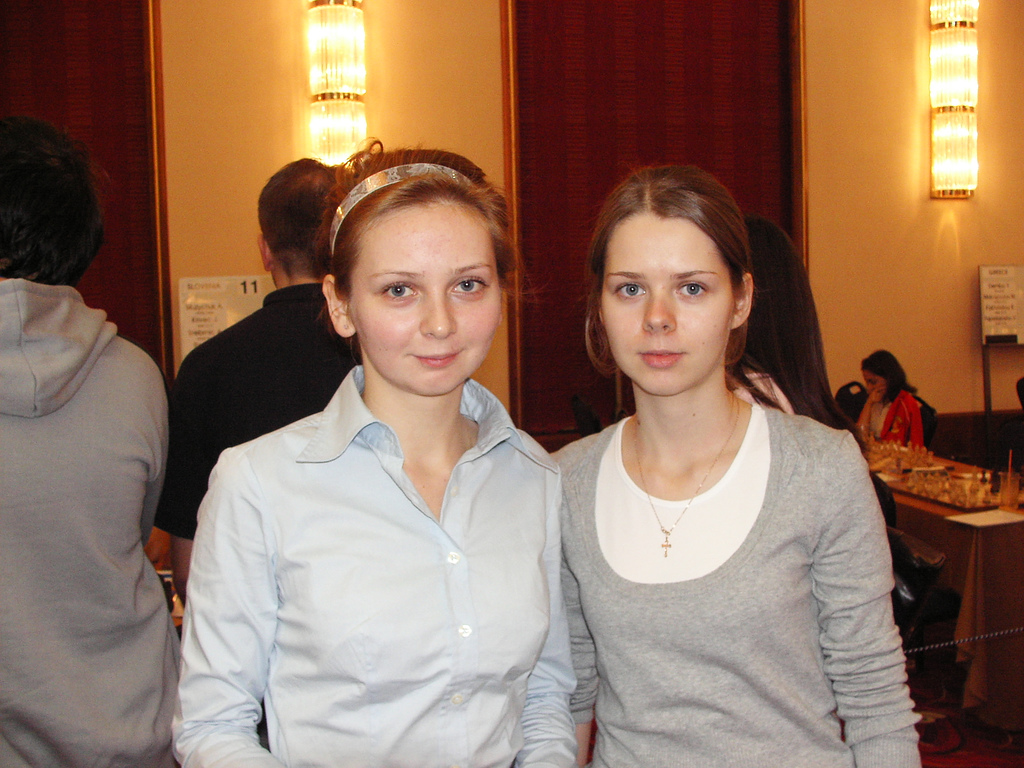
Kosintseva sisters, Nadezhda and Tatiana

The holder and the winner of the honorary FIDE award of Caissa as the 2010 best female chess player. Chess Award of Caissa, designed and executed by artisans of the Lobortas Classic Jewelry House, was solemnly presented on September 18, 2010 within the framework of FIDE Women's Blitz World Championship in Moscow.

In 2010, she tied for 1st–7th with grandmasters Alexander Riazantsev, Vitali Golod, Leonid Kritz, Sébastien Feller, Christian Bauer and Sébastien Mazé in the Master Open of the 43rd Biel Chess Festival, finishing second on tiebreak.

She has not played a FIDE-rated game since December 2015.

== Personal life ==
In 2013, she moved to the United States to study at the University of Texas at Dallas.
