= Vitali Golod =

Israeli chess grandmaster (born 1971)

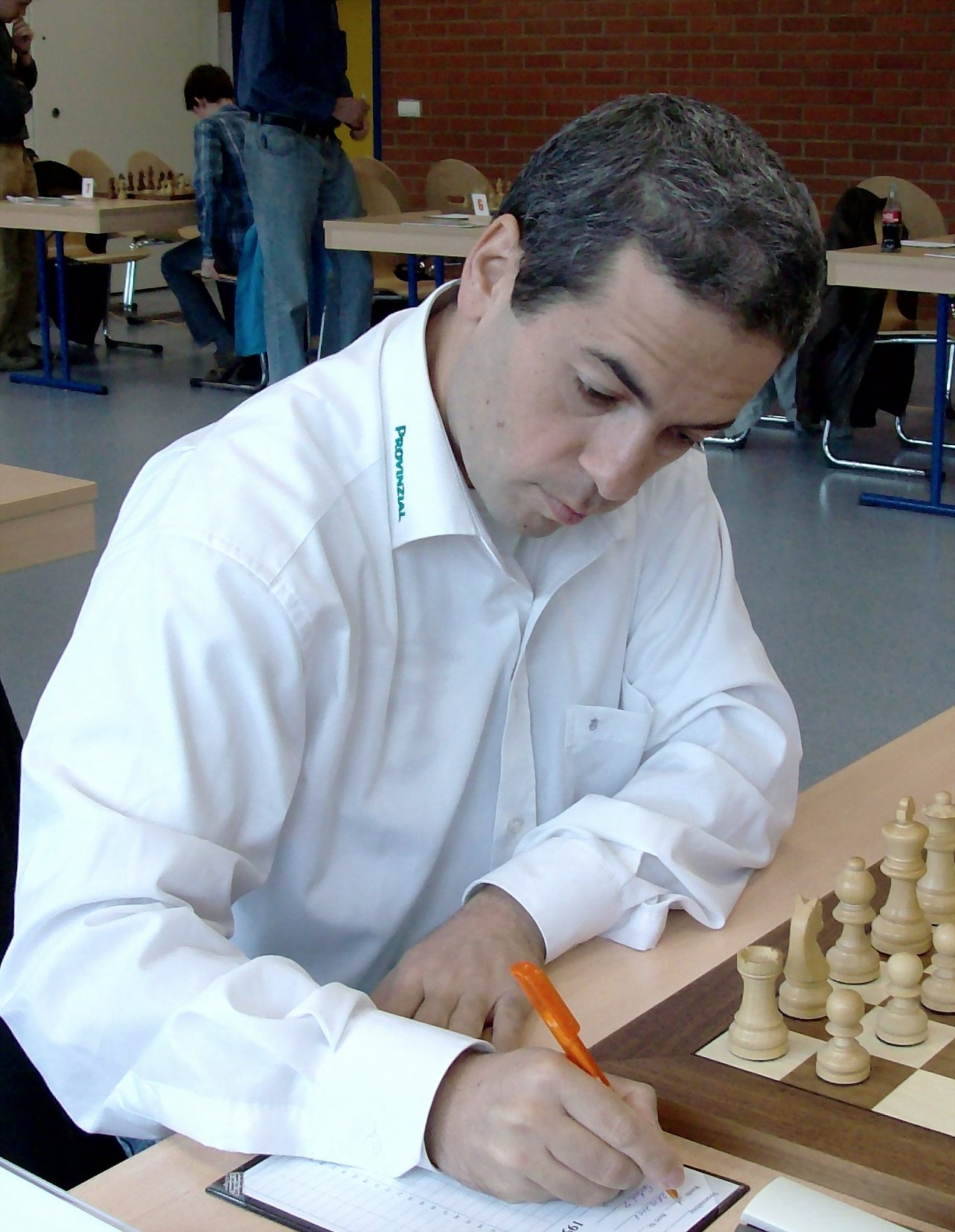

Personal information
- Born: June 23, 1971 (age 55) Lviv, Ukrainian SSR, Soviet Union

Chess career
- Country: Soviet Union → Ukraine (before 1996); Israel (after 1996)
- Title: Grandmaster (1996)
- FIDE rating: 2476 (October 2026)
- Peak rating: 2606 (January 2008)

Vitali Matveyevich Golod (Russian: Виталий Матвеевич Голод; born 23 June 1971) is a Soviet-born Israeli chess player. He holds the title of Grandmaster, which FIDE awarded him in 1996.

== Chess career ==
Golod was Ukrainian champion in 1991. He then moved to Israel.

In 2004, he tied for 1st-2nd places with Sergey Erenburg in the Israeli championship in Ramat Aviv. He also won in Santa Monica.

In 2006, he won the Spring North American FIDE Invitational tournament (GM-B section) in Schaumburg, Illinois, US, and shared third place at the Monarch Assurance Isle of Man International tournament (behind Alexander Areshchenko and Sergey Volkov). The next year Golod tied for 1st-6th with Mateusz Bartel, Zahar Efimenko, Yuri Yakovich, Michael Roiz and Mikhail Kobalia at Isle of Man, finishing second on tiebreak score.

In March 2010, he tied for 1st-4th places with grandmasters Maxim Turov, Sergei Zhigalko and Rinat Jumabayev in the Georgy Agzamov Memorial tournament. Four months later, Golod tied for 1st-7th with grandmasters Alexander Riazantsev, Nadezhda Kosintseva, Leonid Kritz, Sébastien Feller, Christian Bauer and Sébastien Mazé in the Master open tournament at the 43rd Biel Chess Festival. In November, he won the Israeli championship.
