= Alekseyenko =

Alekseyenko, Alekseenko, Alexeenko (Russian: Алексеенко) is a Russified form of the Ukrainian surname Oleksiienko derived from the first name Oleksii (Oleksiy), (from Greek Alexius; Russian: Aleksey). Similar surname: Aleksenko. Notable people with the surname include:

- Andrey Alekseyenko (born 1978), Russian politician
- Kirill Alekseenko (born 1997), Russian chess grandmaster
- Ilya Alekseyenko (1899–1941), Soviet general
- Mikhail Alekseyenko (1847–1917), Russian lawyer
