= Sébastien Mazé =

French chess grandmaster (born 1984)

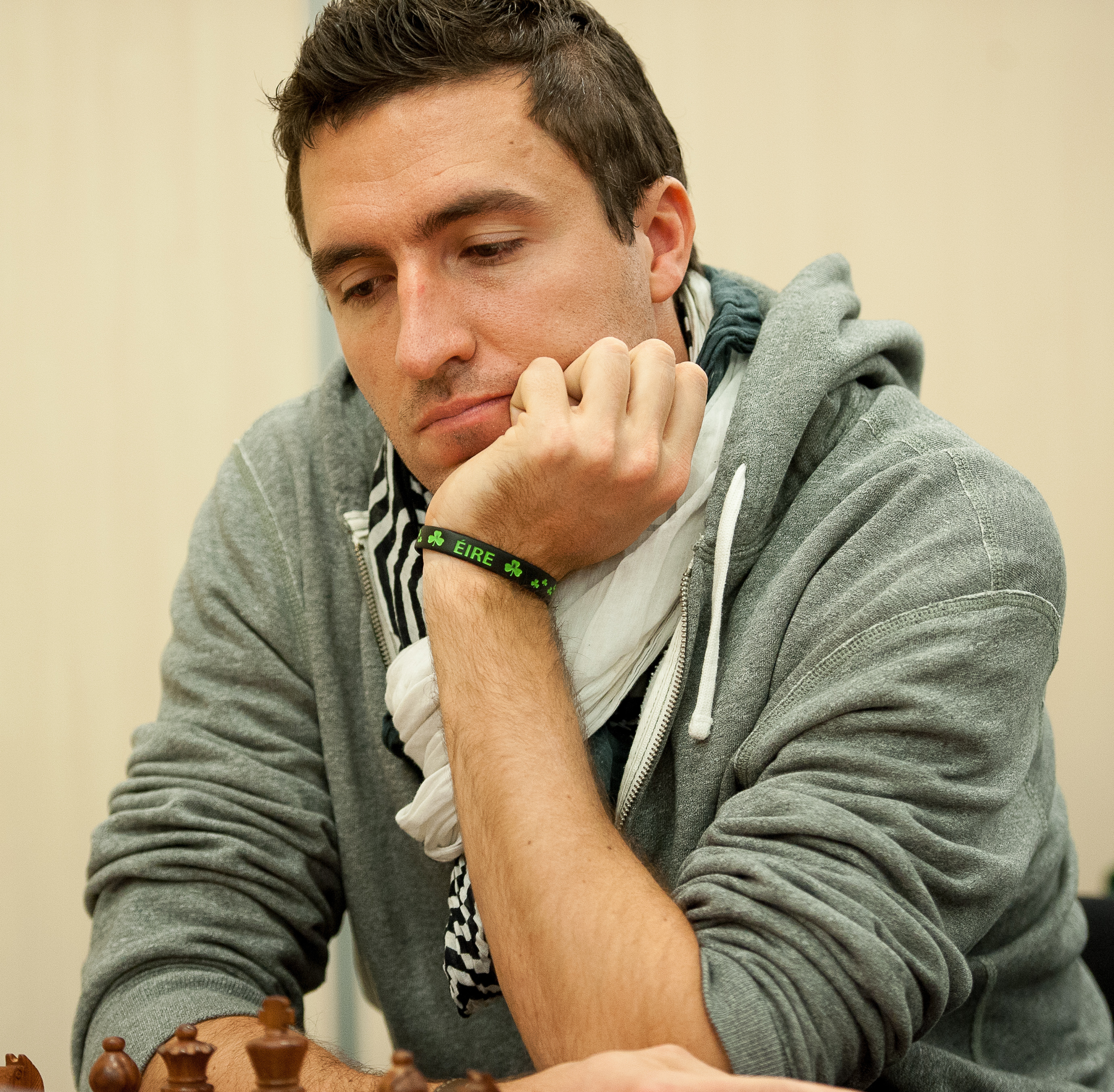
- Mazé in 2016

Personal information
- Born: February 8, 1984 (age 42) Paris, France

Chess career
- Country: France
- Title: Grandmaster (2007)
- FIDE rating: 2494 (July 2026)
- Peak rating: 2628 (July 2016)

Sébastien Mazé (born 8 February 1984) is a French chess player and trainer. He holds the title of Grandmaster, which FIDE awarded him in 2007.

== Chess career ==
Born in Paris, he learned to play chess from his mother at the age of 8. He achieved the titles of International Master in 2003 and Grandmaster in 2007. Mazé finished second to Russian grandmaster Evgeny Alekseev in the Master open tournament of the Biel Chess Festival in 2008, and followed it up with fourth place at the French championship (won by Étienne Bacrot). This qualified him from the French national team at the Olympiad in Dresden that year, where he scored 3½/6. In 2010, he finished in a tie for first place in the Master open at Biel with Alexander Riazantsev, Nadezhda Kosintseva, Vitali Golod, Leonid Kritz, Sébastien Feller and Christian Bauer, finishing seventh on tiebreak. Mazé shared first place with Étienne Bacrot in the London Chess Classic FIDE Open in 2016. The next year, he tied for first again in the same tournament, this time with Gabriel Sargissian and Hrant Melkumyan.

== Trainer ==
In 2009 and 2010, he acted as second to Étienne Bacrot in the tournaments at Elista, Dortmund and Nanjing. Since 2011 he has been a contributor to the book series Chess Evolution.

He was appointed captain of the French national team in 2013, leading them to a silver medal at the European Team Chess Championship in Warsaw, held in that year.
