= Kurnosov =

Kurnosov (Russian: Курносов) is a Russian masculine surname, its feminine counterpart is Kurnosova. It may refer to

- Igor Kurnosov (1985–2013), Russian chess grandmaster
- Kristina Kurnosova (born 1997), Russian volleyball player
- Natalya Kurnosova (born 1975), Russian volleyball player, mother of Kristina
