= Zahar Efimenko =

Ukrainian chess grandmaster (born 1985)

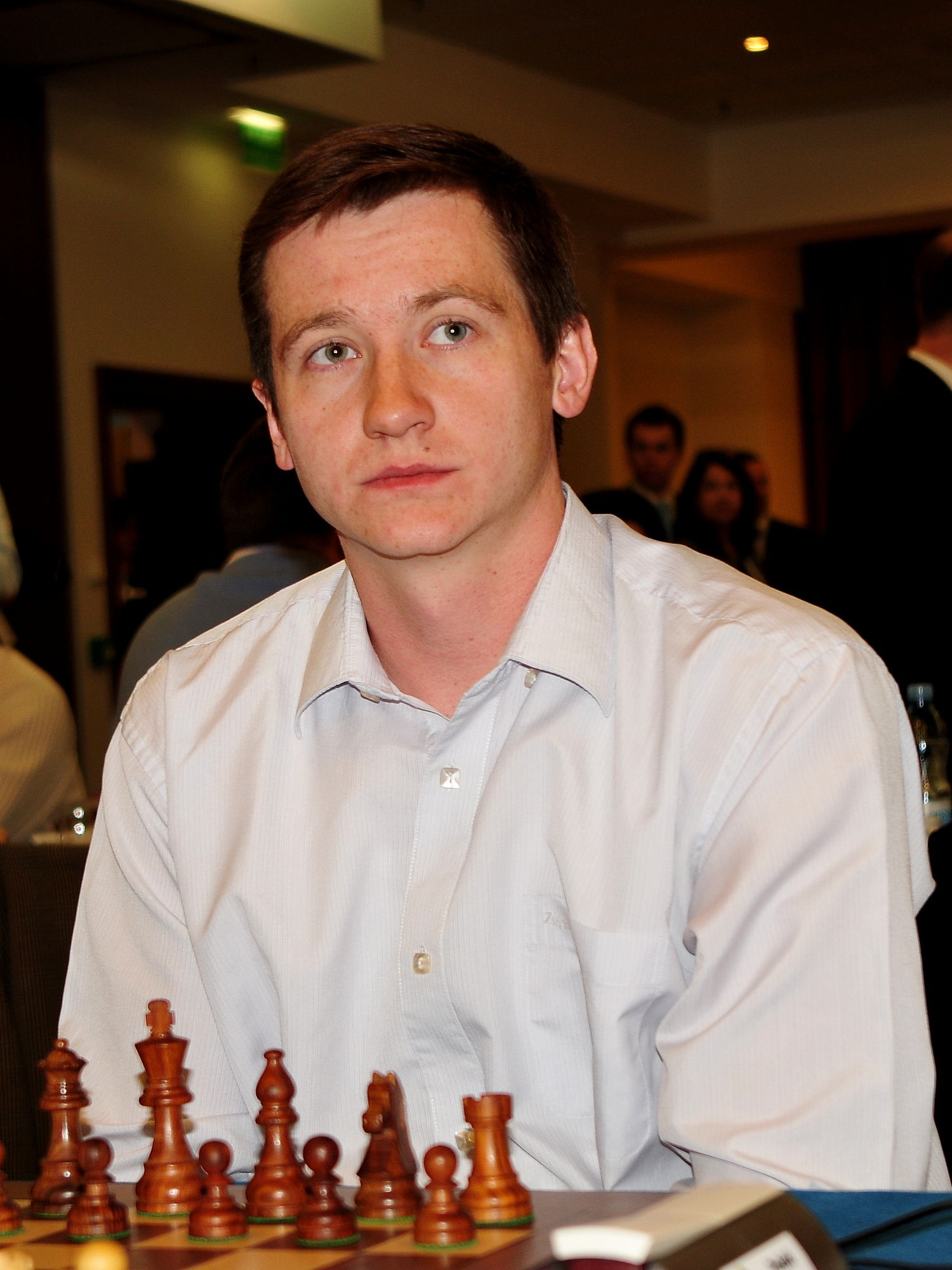

Personal information
- Born: 3 July 1985 (age 41) Makiivka, Ukrainian SSR, Soviet Union
- Spouse: Maria Tantsiura (m. 2015)

Chess career
- Country: Ukraine
- Title: Grandmaster (2002)
- FIDE rating: 2548 (July 2026)
- Peak rating: 2708 (March 2011)
- Peak ranking: No. 34 (January 2006)

Zahar Oleksandrovych Efimenko (Ukrainian: Захар Олександрович Єфименко; born 3 July 1985) is a Ukrainian chess grandmaster. He was a member of the gold medal-winning Ukrainian team at the 2010 Chess Olympiad. Efimenko competed in the FIDE World Cup in 2005, 2009 and 2011.

== Chess career ==
In 1999 Efimenko won the U-14 division of the World Youth Chess Championships in Oropesa del Mar, Spain. In the same year he was a member of the Ukrainian national youth team, which won the U-16 Chess Olympiad in Artek, Ukraine.

Efimenko has won several chess tournaments since then, among them the 2001 Stork Young Masters in Hengelo, Netherlands. In 2005 he tied for 1st–5th with Levon Aronian, Kiril Georgiev, Alexei Shirov and Emil Sutovsky in the Gibraltar Chess Festival. He became champion of Ukraine in 2006. In 2007, he tied for 1st–6th with Vitali Golod, Mateusz Bartel, Yuri Yakovich, Michael Roiz and Mikhail Kobalia in the 16th Monarch Assurance Isle of Man International tournament. In May 2010, he tied for 1st–2nd with Victor Bologan in the 40th Bosna International Tournament in Sarajevo. At the 39th Chess Olympiad, held later in the same year in Khanty-Mansiysk, Efimenko won the team gold medal and an individual silver playing board 4. In July 2013, he tied for 1st–4th with Igor Kurnosov, Mikhailo Oleksienko and Avetik Grigoryan in the Masters tournament of the Abu Dhabi Chess Festival. In 2015, Efimenko tied for 1st–3rd with Andrei Volokitin and Martyn Kravtsiv in the Ukrainian championship in Lviv.

== Personal life ==
Efimenko married Ukrainian chess WIM Maria Tantsiura on 25 April 2015.
