= Bindrich =

Bindrich is a surname. Notable people with the surname include:

- Falko Bindrich (born 1990), German chess grandmaster
- Karsten Bindrich (born 1973), German sport shooter
