= Aleksenko =

Aleksenko is a Russified form of the Ukrainian surname Oleksenko, derived from a diminutive Oleksa for the first name Oleksiy (Олексій).

The surname may refer to:

- Vladimir Aleksenko, Soviet aviator, twice Hero of the Soviet Union
- Ivan Aleksenko, Soviet tank designer, author of T-24 tank
- Val Aleksenko, co-creator of LivingSocial website

Similar surnames: Oleksienko, Alekseyenko/Alekseenko
