= Christian Bauer =

French chess grandmaster and author (born 1977)

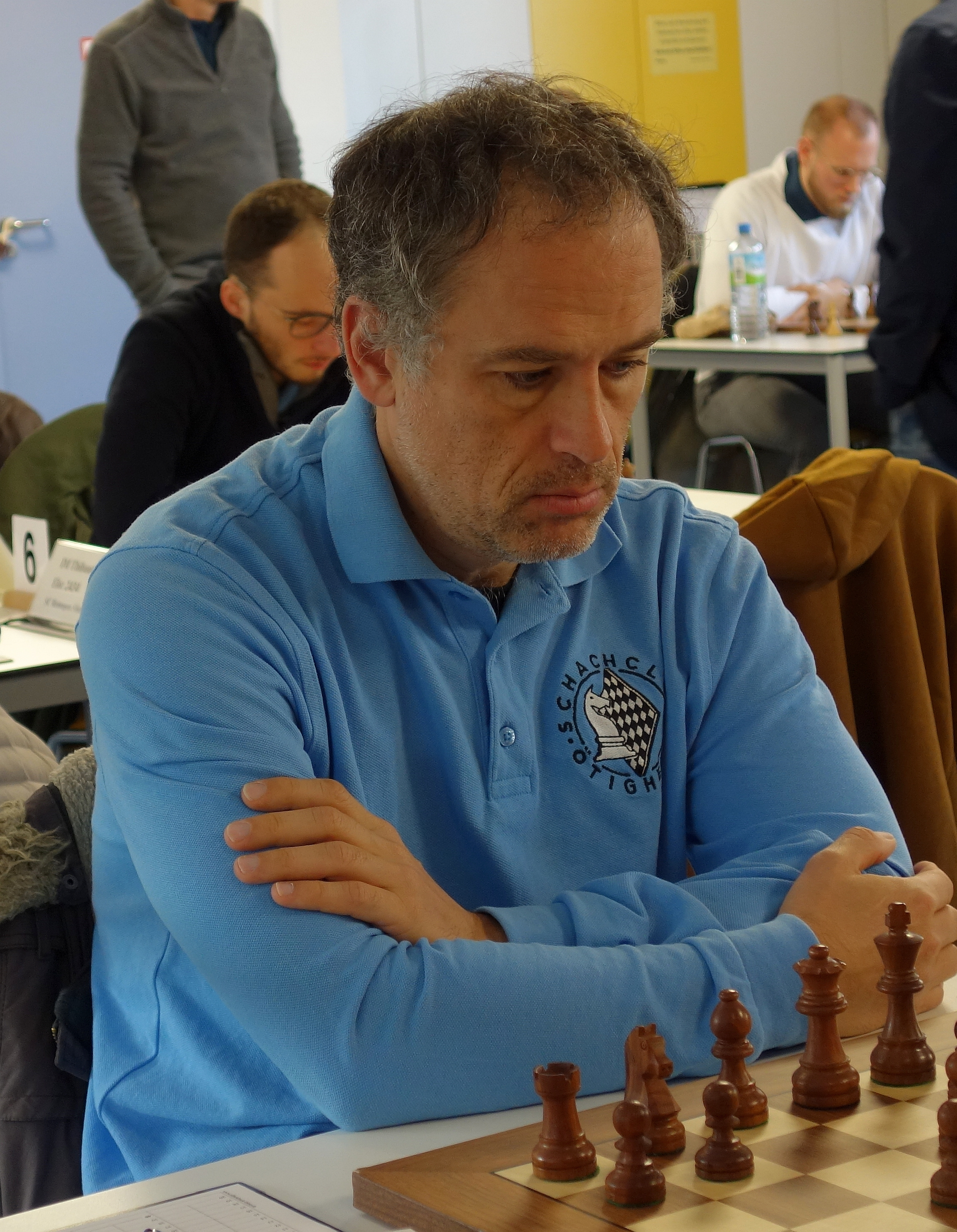
- Bauer in 2023

Personal information
- Born: 11 January 1977 (age 49) Forbach, France

Chess career
- Country: France
- Title: Grandmaster (1997)
- FIDE rating: 2552 (September 2026)
- Peak rating: 2682 (August 2012)
- Peak ranking: No. 57 (April 2005)

Christian Bauer (born 11 January 1977) is a French chess grandmaster and author. He is a three-time French Chess Champion (1996, 2012, 2015).

In 2005 he won the 2nd Calvia Chess Festival. In 2009, came first at Vicente Bonil ahead of 21 GMs and 33 titled players. In 2010, he tied for 1st–7th with Alexander Riazantsev, Vitali Golod, Nadezhda Kosintseva, Leonid Kritz, Sébastien Feller, Sébastien Mazé in the 43rd Biel Chess Festival.

== Books ==
- Bauer, Christian (2005). Play 1...b6: A Dynamic and Hypermodern Opening System for Black. Everyman Chess. ISBN 1-857444-10-8.
- Bauer, Christian (2006). The Philidor Files. Everyman Chess. ISBN 1-85744-4361.
- Bauer, Christian (2010). Play the Scandinavian. Quality Chess. ISBN 978-1-906552-55-8.
- Bauer, Christian (2018). Candidate Moves: A Grandmaster's Method. Thinkers Publishing. ISBN 978-9492510242.
