= Maria Efimenko =

Ukrainian chess player (born 1996)

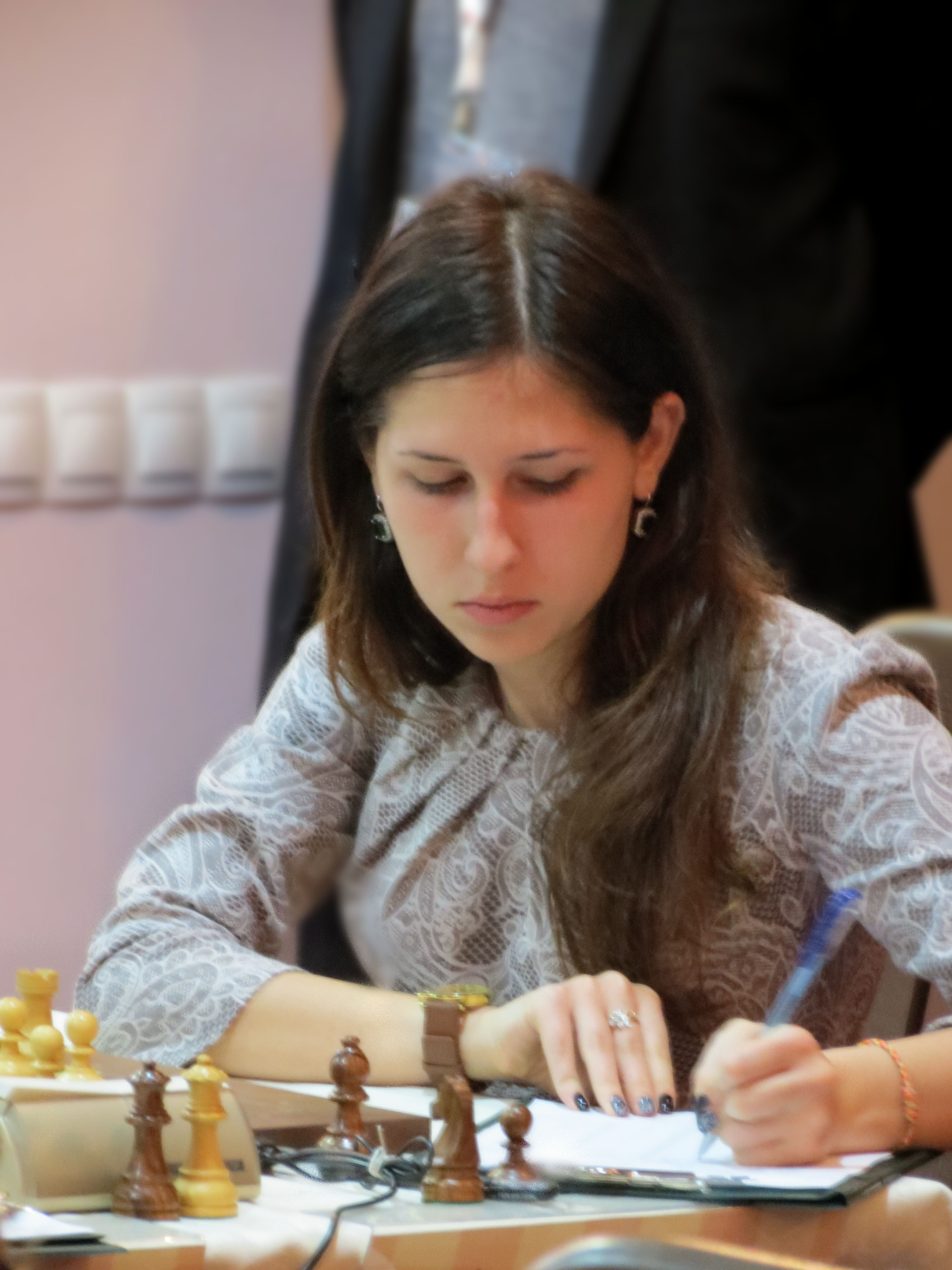
- Efimenko in 2014

Personal information
- Born: 13 February 1996 (age 30)
- Spouse: Zahar Efimenko (m. 2015)

Chess career
- Country: Ukraine
- Title: Woman International Master (2013)
- Peak rating: 2352 (October 2014)

Maria Efimenko (Ukrainian: Марья Ефименко, also transliterated Marja; born 13 February 1996), née Tantsiura (Ukrainian: Танцюра), is a Ukrainian chess player who has held the FIDE title of Woman International Master (WIM) since 2013.

== Biography ==
Efimenko is a multiple winner of Ukrainian Youth Chess Championships for girls in different age groups: in 2008, in the U12 age group; in 2010, in the U14 age group; in 2012 and 2014, in the U18 age group. In 2014, she won a bronze medal in the Ukrainian Youth Chess Championships in the girls U20 age group. Also Efimenko won Ukrainian Youth Fast Chess Championships for girls in 2008, in U12 age group; in 2009, in U14 age group; in 2010, in U14 age group; in 2011, in U16 age group; in 2012, in U16 age group; in 2013, in U18 and U20 age groups. Also she won Ukrainian Youth Blitz Chess Championships for girls in 2010, in U14 age group; in 2011 and 2012, in U16 age groups; in 2011 and 2013, in U18 age groups.

She repeatedly represented Ukraine at the European Youth Chess Championships and World Youth Chess Championships in different age groups, where she won two medals: gold (in 2012, at the European Youth Chess Championship in the U16 girls age group) and silver (in 2011, at the European Youth Chess Championship in the U16 girls age group).

In 2013, Efimenko won the silver medal in the Ukrainian Women's Fast Chess Championship, and in 2014 she won this tournament. In 2013, she won the bronze medal in Ukrainian Women's Blitz Chess Championship.

== Personal life ==
Maria Tantsiura married Ukrainian chess Grandmaster Zahar Efimenko on 25 April 2015.

== Working as a chess coach ==
Maria currently helps chess players all around the world to become the best they can. She follows a role-model strategy and currently works for MM Chess Academy, an online chess academy based in Chicago.
