= Falko Bindrich =

German chess grandmaster (born 1990)

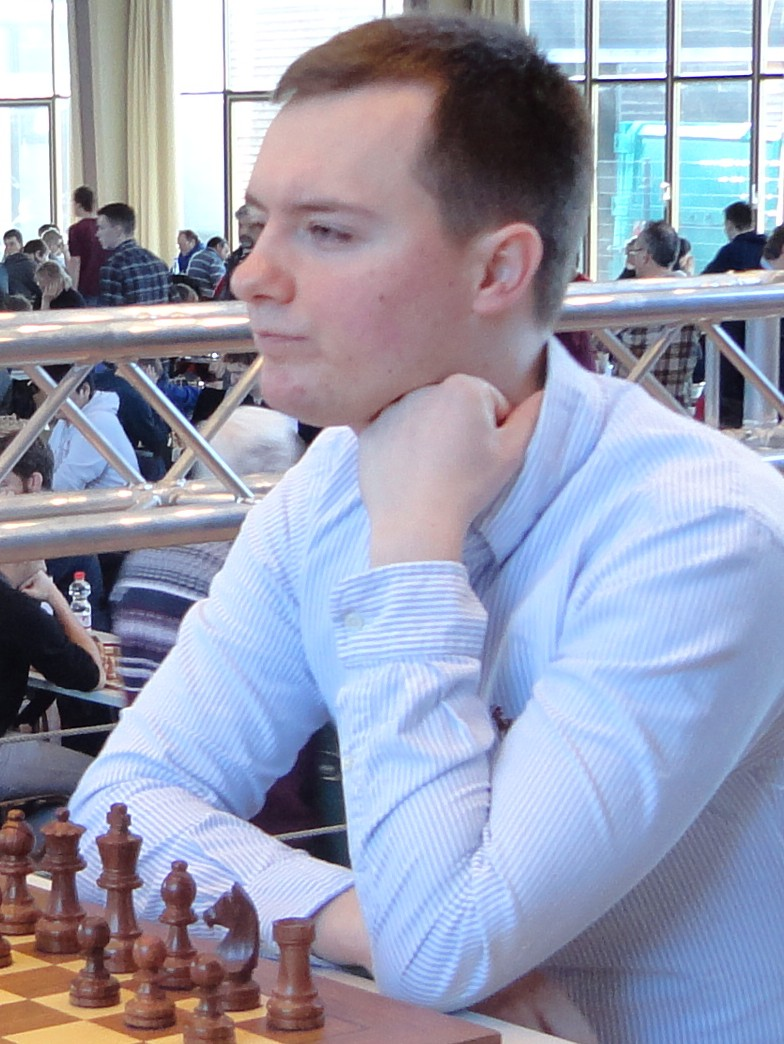
- Falko Bindrich, Karlsruhe 2016

Personal information
- Born: 17 October 1990 (age 35) Zittau, Germany

Chess career
- Country: Germany
- Title: Grandmaster (2007)
- FIDE rating: 2584 (July 2026)
- Peak rating: 2610 (December 2014)

Falko Bindrich (born 17 October 1990) is a German chess grandmaster. He is the No. 13 ranked German player and No. 275 ranked world player as of May 2025.

Born in Zittau, Bindrich became a FIDE Master at the age of 13. He earned his International Master title in 2006 and his grandmaster title a year later. He played in the 2008 Chess Olympiad, held in Dresden, where his German team placed 13th. He has competed in several other prestigious chess events, such as the 2008 Bundesliga and the 2010 Chess Olympiad.

== Early life ==
Falko Bindrich was born on 17 October 1990 in Zittau, Germany, to parents Zdena and Oswald Bindrich. His father, Oswald Bindrich (born 1951), was an expert-level chess player, with a highest Elo rating of 2212. In 1993, at the age of three, Falko was taught chess by his brother and soon after, his father, Oswald, enrolled him the Oberland Chess Club. In 1998, he entered for the German Youth Individual Championship (under nine) and placed 28th out of 80 participants. After achieving second place in the 1999 German Youth U10 Individual Championship, he was allowed to attend the U10 European Championship where he finished only 39th. After this disappointment, he asked his father, Oswald, how he could improve, and he set him on a daily training regimen with him and later consulted with stronger German players. In late 1999, he reached 1400 Elo, whereby his training sessions were extended and held with the likes of grandmasters Lubomir Ftacnik and Zigurds Lanka.

In 2000, he reached second place in the German Youth Individual Championship (under ten) and travelled to Spain for the U10 World Cup, where he placed seventeenth. By 2001, aged 11, Falko was rated 2054 fide and had achieved first place in the German Youth Individual Championship U12. In 2002, Bindrich defeated Hungarian International Master Attila Parkanyi and in September, also defeated Swedish grandmaster Tiger Hillarp Persson in Fürth at the Pyramid Cup. In October 2002 he delivered an outstanding performance of 2500+ in the Czech Open Championship. In 2003, Bindrich became the youngest German player to receive the FIDE master title, after crossing 2300 fide.

== Chess career ==
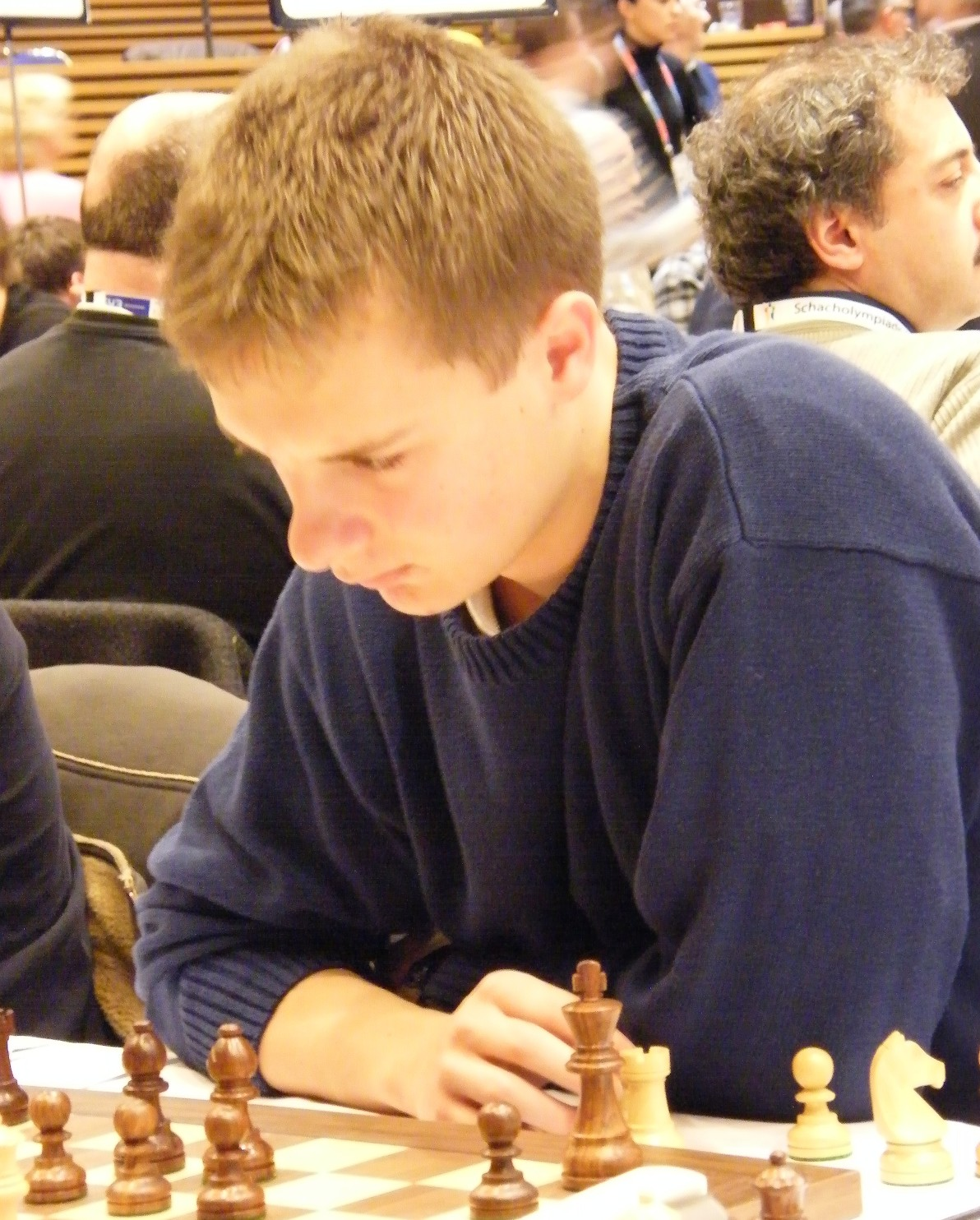
Bindrich playing the 2008 Chess Olympiad

In late 2003, Bindrich came in fifth in the German Youth Championship U18, which got him elected to the German Under-18 team. He gained his first International Master norm in 2004 for the B national team in the Mitropa Cup. After this he attended tournaments in several Eastern countries, such as Kraków, Budapest, Moscow and Riga. Later that year Bindrich supported the German Cancer Society by holding a simultaneous exhibition. In 2005, he earned his second IM norm in a grandmaster tournament in Crimea. Bindrich settled first place in his first adult event in the early January 2006 Staufer Open and a few days later in Geneva, he earned his 3rd and final IM norm, and was awarded the International Master title.

With 11.0/15 and an Elo performance of 2670 for the SC Remagen event, he secured his first Grandmaster norm. He gained his second GM norm in the European Championships 2007. By spring 2007, Bindrich had crossed 2500 fide and had met all of the requirements for the grandmaster title and became GM-elect. In October 2007, he was given the grandmaster title. At the age of 16, he was the youngest German ever to achieve the grandmaster title and was given the honorary title of Zittau and signed in the Golden Book of the city.

Bindrich attended the 12th Neckar Open in 2008 and finished first out of over 300 participants, with 7½/9, finishing half a point ahead of Leon Hoyos, Dgebuadze, Lauber, Graf, Krämer, Peralta, Chatalbashev, Erdos, and Fedorchuk, who all finished the tournament with 7/9. He also played for Germany in the 2008 Chess Olympiad, held in Dresden, where his team placed 13th out of 146 overall teams as well as the 2009 and 2010 Chess Olympiads.

In 2011, Bindrich became CEO of the Amateur Chess Organization (ACO), alongside international master Tobias Hirneise.

Bindrich played in and won the 2011 April Budapest event despite there being no prizes offered there, with 6½/9. There he defeated his fellow countryman Cristoph Natsidis, who only needed a draw to reach an IM norm. He also won the Luzern Open 2011 Group A section tournament, with 5½/7 in November 2011.

During the fourth round of the 2011 German Chess Championships, Falko Bindrich was late to his game and tournament director Ralph Alt declared the game lost on Bindrich's arrival after a few minutes. Bindrich refused to accept the penalty and withdrew from the tournament shortly after, and went on to blog about the double standards of arbiters, claiming that he had seen several other players arrive late in the previous rounds, and no penalty was issued to them.

Since the October Bundesliga issue, Bindrich has appeared in the Austrian Team Championship, where he scored 6 out of 8, and the 36th Zurich Christmas Open, where he came in as shared second place ahead of 133 players.

== 2012 Bundesliga cheating accusations ==
In Mülheim, in the first round of the 2012 German Bundesliga on 20 October 2012, Falko Bindrich defeated the strong 2600+ Elo grandmaster Pavel Tregubov in an English Symmetrical: Botvinnik system.

Bindrich vs. Tregubov

Position: c7 black king, d7 black knight, e6 white king, g6 black pawn, g5 white pawn, h5 black pawn, h4 white pawn, f3 white knight

Final position after 61.Nf3

Bindrich–Tregubov
1.Nf3 c5 2.c4 Nc6 3.Nc3 e5 4.g3 g6 5.Bg2 Bg7 6.a3 Nge7 7.0-0 0-0 8.d3 d6 9.Rb1 a5 10.Bd2 h6 11.Ne1 Be6 12.Nc2 d5 13.cxd5 Nxd5 14.Ne3 Nde7 15.Na4 b6 16.b4 cxb4 17.axb4 b5 18.Nc5 Ba2 19.bxa5 Bxb1 20.Qxb1 Ra7 21.Qxb5 Nd4 22.Qb6 Nc8 23.Qxd8 Nxe2 24.Kh1 Rxd8 25.Nc4 Nd4 26.Rb1 Bf8 27.Nb7 Re8 28.Be3 f6 29.f4 Ra6 30.fxe5 fxe5 31.Bd5 Kh7 32.g4 Nc2 33.Bd2 Ne7 34.Be4 Ng8 35.Rb6 Rxb6 36.axb6 Bb4 37.Nbd6 Rb8 38.Bxb4 Nxb4 39.b7 Nf6 40.Nxe5 Nxe4 41.dxe4 Rd8 42.Nec4 Kg7 43.e5 Nc6 44.Kg2 Kf8 45.Kf3 Ke7 46.Ke4 Ke6 47.Nb5 Rd1 48.Na5 Re1 49.Kd3 Nb8 50.Nc6 Rd1 51.Kc2 Nxc6 52.Kxd1 Kxe5 53.Ke2 h5 54.Kf3 Nb8 55.h4 Kd5 56.g5 Kc6 57.Nd4 Kxb7 58.Ke4 Nd7 59.Kd5 Kc8 60.Ke6 Kc7 61.Nf3 1–0

At the end of the game, feeling insulted, Tregubov refused to shake his hand. Two days after the game, Tregubov and his team would complain to arbiters about his suspect strong play, and his frequent toilet breaks. On the second day, Bindrich had the black pieces against Sebastian Siebrecht and on move 10, he took a second toilet break. Siebrecht, having played such cheaters as Christoph Natsidis in the past, suspected that he was using an analysis program on his smartphone. On Bindrich's return an arbiter asked to search him and that he give over his smartphone, which under tournament rules, the referee is allowed to do. Bindrich refused to hand it over, saying that there was private information on the phone, and he was forfeited the game.

Siebrecht vs. Bindrich

Position: h1 white rook, f1 white bishop, e1 white king, c1 white bishop, a1 white rook, h2 white pawn, g2 white pawn, f2 white pawn, e2 white knight, d2 white pawn, c2 white queen, b2 white pawn, e3 white pawn, c3 white knight, a3 white pawn, e4 black pawn, c4 white pawn, g5 black pawn, h6 black pawn, f6 black knight, c6 black knight, g7 black bishop, f7 black pawn, e7 black queen, d7 black pawn, c7 black pawn, b7 black pawn, a7 black pawn, g8 black king, f8 black rook, c8 black bishop, a8 black rook

Final position on adjudication

Siebrecht–Bindrich
1.c4 e5 2.Nc3 Nf6 3.Nf3 Nc6 4.a3 e4 5.Ng5 Qe7 6.e3 h6 7.Nh3 g5 8.Qc2 Bg7 9.Ng1 0-0 10.Nge2 1–0

Bindrich later fervently denied cheating, and released a five-page document, declaring his innocence, stating that his smartphone was always switched off. He claimed to not use the bathroom any more than usual and that several others did so too without penalty. Bindrich denied that he went to the toilet on his turn, saying that there were witnesses there who could confirm this. He stated that, in his game with Tregubov, "... after reaching a clear advantage I didn't play the best way possible, as anyone who plays through the game at home can easily establish" and Tregubov had played the same opening three weeks earlier against Andrei Istrățescu, and that he'd looked up the theory to the line that was played. He also questioned "Is it really so unlikely that a grandmaster with 2530 Elo wins with white against a grandmaster with 2600 Elo?" and complained that the search was an invasion of privacy.

The team he was playing for, SC Eppingen went on to lose overall to Katernberg 3½–4½. The use of a chess engine was never proven, but as a result of his actions, the German Chess Federation issued a 2-year suspension from over-the-board play. Bindrich issued a statement saying that he did not accept the decision of the board, and issued an appeal against the decision of the President of the German Chess Federation. On 2 May 2013, the arbitration court of the German Chess Federation cancelled the ban, stating it was issued without legal basis.
