= Sebastian Siebrecht =

German chess grandmaster (born 1973)

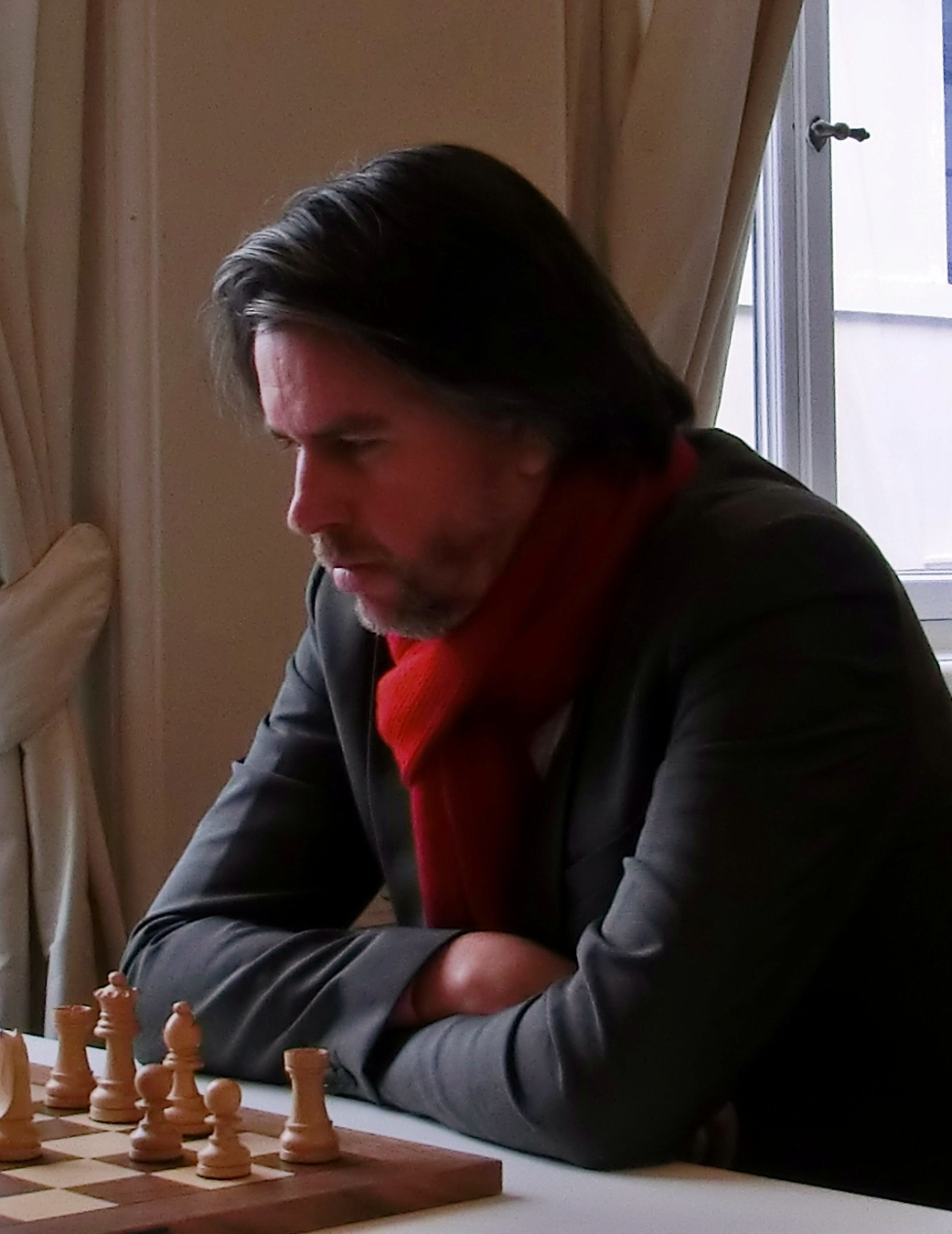

Personal information
- Born: 16 April 1973 (age 53) Herdecke, Germany

Chess career
- Country: Germany
- Title: Grandmaster (2008)
- Peak rating: 2508 (December 2013)

Sebastian Siebrecht (born 16 April 1973) is a German chess grandmaster. He earned the FIDE master title in 1993, followed by the International Master title in 1996. He was awarded the grandmaster title in 2008 after achieving five norms.

== Early life ==
Siebrecht was born in Herdecke on April 16, 1973. At the age of three, he moved with his parents to Essen. He started playing chess because he watched his father and brother playing and was interested, whereby he started playing his father. He also cites a friend in school, who was interested in chess, whom he played blindfold chess with during mathematics lessons. Being a very tall man (2.02m), he made the basketball team in his school, playing for the regional (NRW) U17 section. He studied law at the Ruhr-University Bochum.

== Chess career ==
In 1993, Siebrecht earned his FIDE master title, and three years later, gained his International Master title. He achieved five grandmaster norms overall, his first at the 8th International Bavarian Championships 2004, also at the 21st Chess Festival 2005, at the 8th Individual European Championship 2007 in Dresden and at the Kaupthing Opens 2007 and then finally the Conca della Presolana 2007. FIDE awarded him the grandmaster title despite never crossing 2500+ fide on the official FIDE ratings list. In August 2010, Siebrecht won the Chess960 competition in Baden-Baden. He is a tournament director for Freestyle Chess.

Siebrecht has been known to come up against cheaters in his over-the-board games. First in 2011, in the German Championships, FIDE master Christoph Natsidis was found with a smartphone analyzing the current position he was in. A year later, Falko Bindrich had his game declared lost after he refused to hand over his smartphone and was later suspended from over-the-board play.
