= Marta Bartel =

Polish chess player (born 1988)

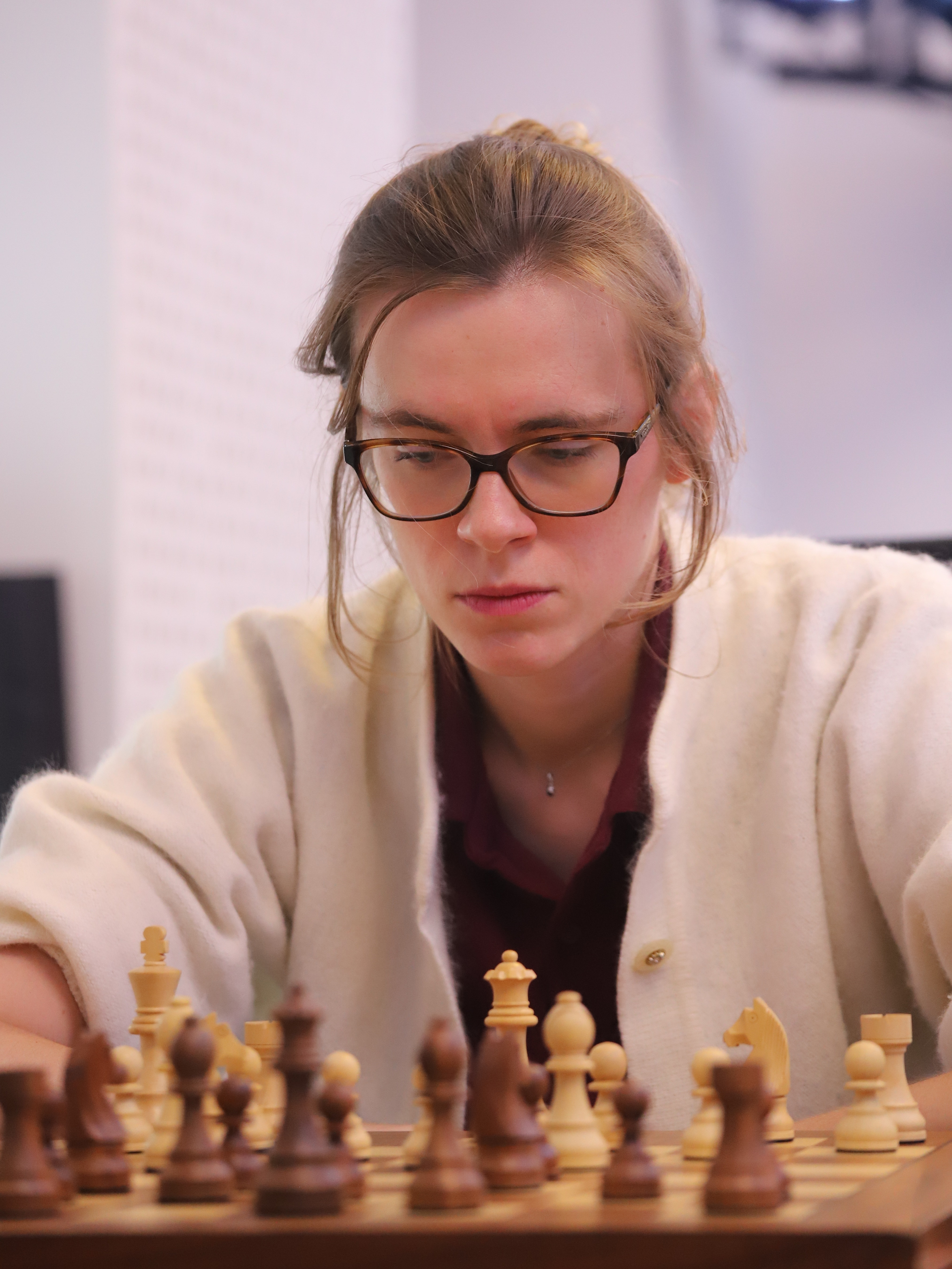
- Bartel in 2022

Personal information
- Born: 20 May 1988 (age 38) Zambrów, Poland
- Spouse: Mateusz Bartel (m. 2013)

Chess career
- Country: Poland
- Title: Woman Grandmaster (2009)
- FIDE rating: 2192 (October 2019)
- Peak rating: 2379 (September 2014)

Marta Bartel (née Przeździecka; born 20 May 1988) is a Polish chess player who was awarded the title of Woman Grandmaster in 2009.

== Career ==
Since 2000, Bartel has participated in the Polish Junior Championships in various age categories. Her first medal success was achieved in 2004 in Łeba when she finished second in the under 16 group. The same year, she participated in the European Youth Chess Championship and finished fifth in the U16 category. In 2005, she finished third in the under 20 division of the Polish Junior Championship in Środa Wielkopolska. The same year she appeared for the first time in the final of the Polish Women's Championship in Suwałki. In 2006, she caused a major upset by tying for first place in the Polish Women's Championship in Trzebinia, but lost the playoff to Jolanta Zawadzka. She followed this up with a fourth place in the Polish Junior Championship under 20 division in Środa Wielkopolska. She competed in the European Individual Women's Chess Championship in Kuşadası, finishing 16th of 96 players, the highest placed of the Polish players. In 2012, she was part of the Polish team which won the silver medal in the Students World Chess Cup in Guimarães. In 2014, she finished third in the Polish Students Women's Chess Championship's in Katowice. She also won two gold medals (2009, 2012) in the Polish Women's Team Chess Championships.

Bartel played for Poland in three Women's Chess Olympiads:

- In 2006, at third board in the 37th Chess Olympiad in Turin (+6, =1, -3),
- In 2008, at reserve board in the 38th Chess Olympiad in Dresden (+1, =0, -2),
- In 2014, won individual silver medal at fourth board in the 41st Chess Olympiad in Tromsø (+4 =5 -0).

Bartel played for Poland in two World Team Chess Championships:

- In 2007, at reserve board in the Women's World Team Chess Championship 2007 in Yekaterinburg (+4, =2, -1),
- In 2015, at fourth board in the Women's World Team Chess Championship 2015 in Chengdu (+2, =2, -3).

Bartel played for Poland in two European Team Chess Championship:

- In 2007, won team silver medal at reserve board in the 7th European Team Chess Championship (women) in Heraklion (+2, =1, -1),
- In 2013, at fourth board (Poland III) in the 10th European Team Chess Championship (women) in Warsaw (+3, =3, -3).

== Personal life ==
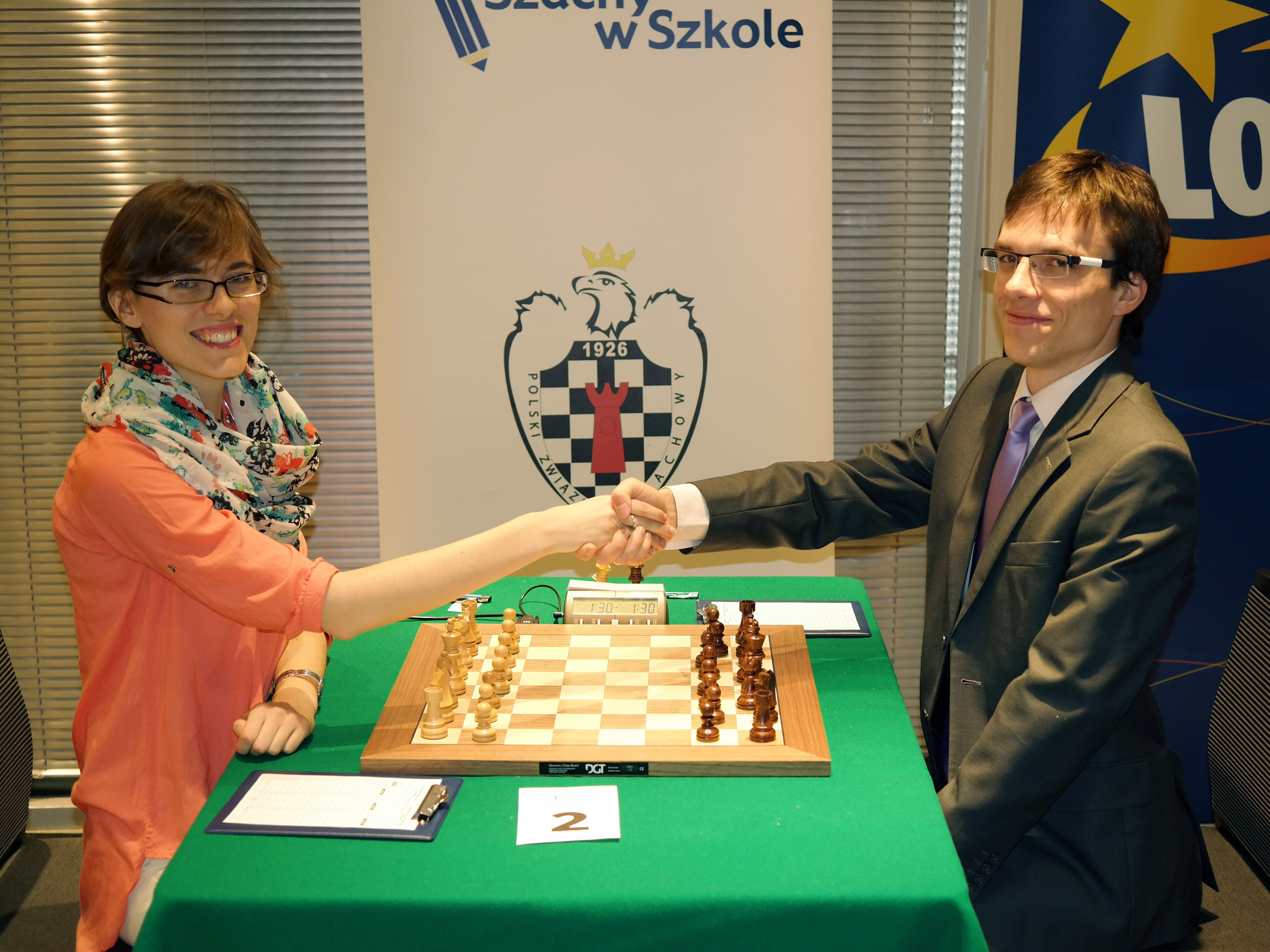
With husband Mateusz Bartel in Warszawa 2014

Marta's sister Ewa Przezdziecka is also a chess player and holds the title of Woman FIDE Master (WFM).

In 2013, Marta married International Grandmaster (GM) Mateusz Bartel.
