= Yannick Pelletier =

Swiss chess grandmaster (born 1976)

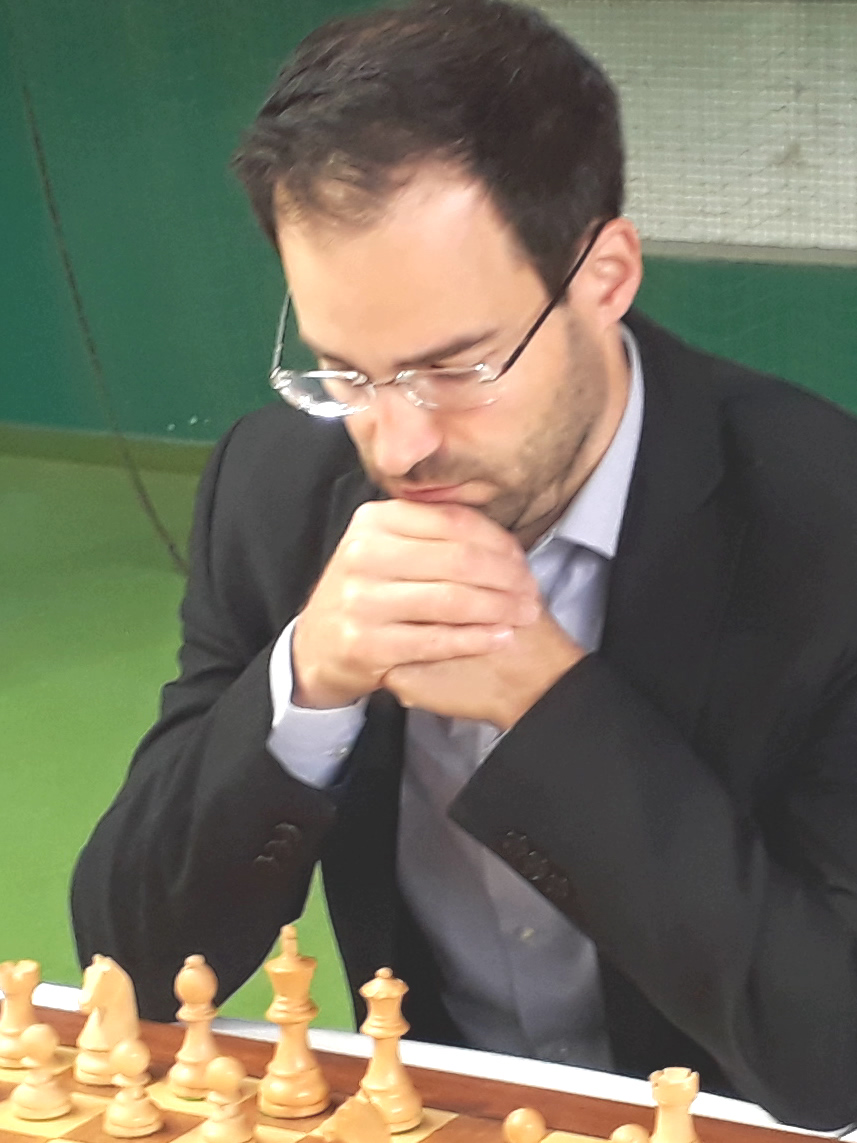

Personal information
- Born: September 22, 1976 (age 49) Biel/Bienne, Switzerland

Chess career
- Country: Switzerland
- Title: Grandmaster (2001)
- FIDE rating: 2519 (July 2026)
- Peak rating: 2624 (January 2003)
- Peak ranking: No. 69 (January 2003)

Yannick Pelletier (born September 22, 1976, in Biel/Bienne, Switzerland) is a Swiss chess Grandmaster and a six-time Swiss Champion currently living in Luxembourg.

== Career ==
He completed his final Grandmaster norm at the 2000 Chess Olympiad in Istanbul and was officially awarded the Grandmaster title in 2001. Pelletier won the Swiss Chess Championship 6 times, in 1995, 2000, 2002, 2010, 2014 and 2017. He has also won numerous titles at the Swiss Team Championship with his first club Biel, and later the SG Zurich.

In 2005, he won the German Bundesliga with Werder Bremen. He also won the French Team Championship with Clichy in 2007, 2008, 2012 and 2013, as well as the French Cup in 2008 and 2009. In 2018, he won the gold medal on board 6 for Bischwiller and helped this team to win the French Team Championship.

In 2001 he tied for 1st-4th with Tamaz Gelashvili, Mark Hebden and Vladimir Tukmakov in the 9th Neuchâtel Open. He won the Zurich Christmas Open alone in 2001 (with 6,5 out of 7) and in 2006 and tied for 1st in 2002, 2004, 2007, 2008 and 2009). He tied for 3rd-5th in 2007 with Judit Polgár and Alexander Grischuk in the 40th Biel chess tournament. He won on tiebreak at the Basel Hilton Open 2010 and at the Cap d'Agde Open in 2012. He won the Martinique Open alone in 2012 and on tiebreak in 2013.

Leader of the Swiss national team, he has represented his country at all major events since 1996 (Chess Olympiads, European Team Championship).

In October 2015, he beat World Nr 2 Hikaru Nakamura at the European Club Cup in Skopje. Barely a month later, at the European Team Championship in Reykjavík, he won against World Champion Magnus Carlsen. He is only the third Swiss chess player to beat a reigning World Champion (after Oskar Nägeli in 1932, who beat Alexander Alekhine at a training tournament in Bern, and of course Viktor Kortchnoi). In November 2016, representing the SG Zurich at the European Club Cup in Novi Sad, he achieved his best-ever rating performance (2803) by scoring 6 out of 7 on board 3.

Fluent in French, English, German, Spanish and Russian, he is one of the most appreciated live commentators at chess events. He has been named by the chess historian Edward Winter as one of the top five Internet broadcasters.

From 2013 until 2018, he worked as the Tournament Director of the International Biel Chess Festival.

In September 2013, he took part in a special event called the Marseille Biathlon, regrouping chess and shogi. He won the chess part with 4.5 out of 5 and scored 3 out of 5 in shogi. This enabled him to win the event. Since then, he improved at shogi and took part in the 5th International Shogi Forum in Shizuoka.
