= Igor Kurnosov =

Russian chess grandmaster (1985–2013)

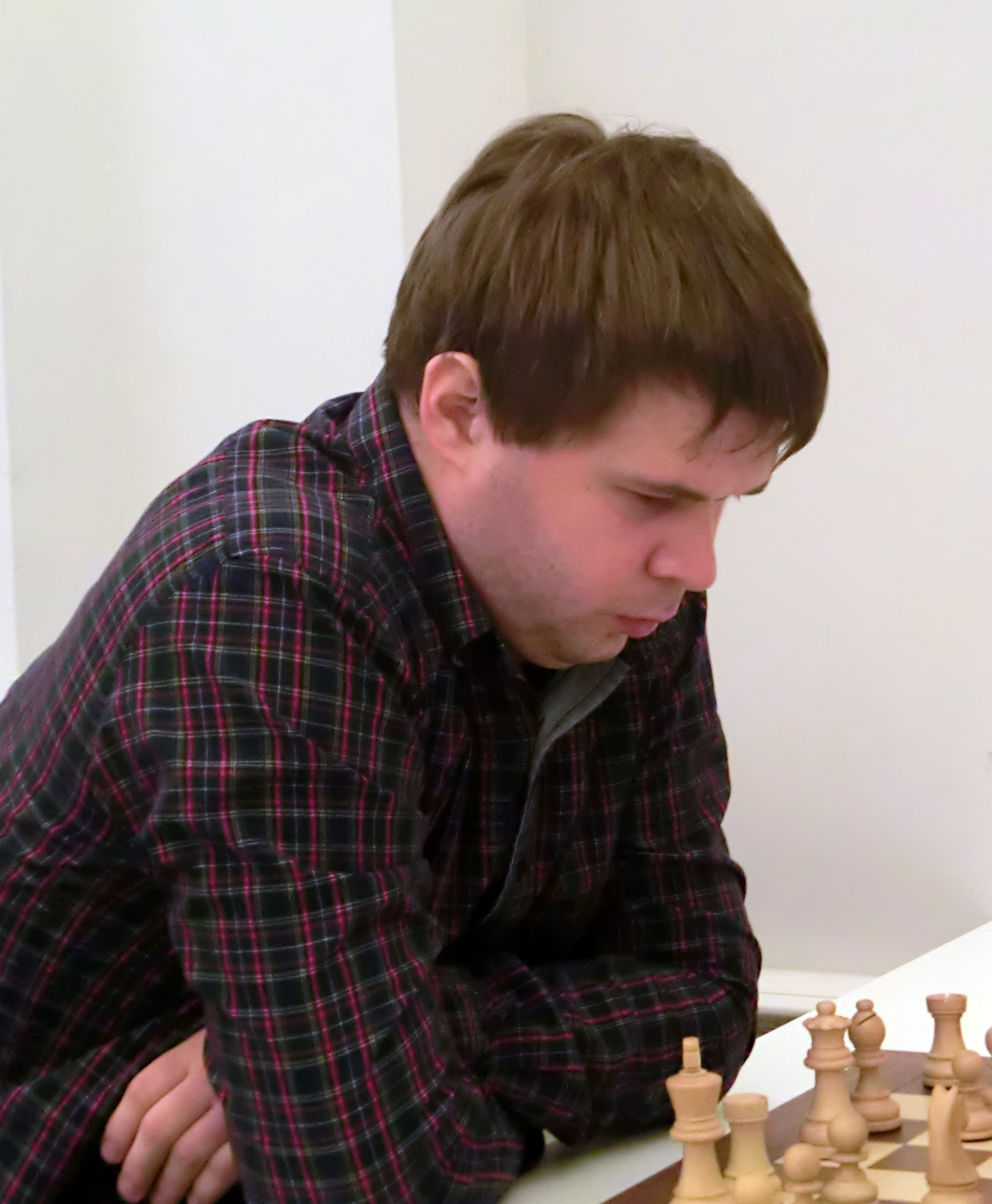
- Kurnosov in 2013

Personal information
- Born: 30 May 1985 Chelyabinsk, Russian SFSR, Soviet Union
- Died: 8 August 2013 (aged 28) Chelyabinsk, Russia

Chess career
- Country: Russia
- Title: Grandmaster (2003)
- Peak rating: 2680 (May 2010)
- Peak ranking: No. 52 (May 2010)

Igor Kurnosov (Russian: Игорь Курносов; 30 May 1985 – 8 August 2013) was a Russian chess grandmaster.

== Career ==
In 2004 he won the 8th Open International Bavarian Chess Championship in Bad Wiessee edging out on tiebreak other five grandmasters. Kurnosov took clear first place at the Arctic Chess Challenge in Tromsø, Norway in 2008, 2008/9 Hastings Masters tournament and 2011 Politiken Cup in Helsingør, Denmark. In 2010 he played in the Russian Championship Superfinal, where he scored 5½/11 for a shared 7th–10th place. In December 2011, Kurnosov won the Zurich Christmas Open by tiebreak over Boris Grachev. In 2012, by winning the semi-finals in Astana, he qualified for the World Rapid Chess Championship final. In the same year he tied for 1st–3rd with Sergei Movsesian and Romain Edouard in the Biel Masters Open winning the tournament on countback. In May 2013 he won the Nakhchivan Open on tiebreak over Aleksandr Shimanov and Gadir Guseinov. Two months later, in July 2013, Kurnosov won the 20th Abu Dhabi Chess Festival, edging out Zahar Efimenko, Mikhailo Oleksienko and Avetik Grigoryan on tiebreak.

On the August 2013 FIDE rating list, Kurnosov ranked 84th in the world with a 2662 rating.

Kurnosov was hit and killed by a motorist on 8 August 2013 at 2:45 am in his home town Chelyabinsk, aged 28.

== Notable games ==
- Igor Kurnosov vs Marat Dzhumaev, 2nd Agzamov Memorial 2008, Pirc Defense: Byrne Variation (B07), 1-0

Kurnosov defeated top seed Shakhriyar Mamedyarov at the 2009 Aeroflot Open in Moscow in 21 moves. Mamedyarov filed a complaint of cheating following the game, but the complaint was dismissed.

- Shakhriyar Mamedyarov vs Igor Kurnosov, Aeroflot Open 2009, Neo-Grünfeld Defence: Goglidze Attack (D70), 0-1
Mamedyarov vs. Kurnosov, Moscow 2009

Position: h1 white rook, b1 white king, g2 white pawn, e2 white knight, d2 black queen, b2 white pawn, a2 white pawn, c3 white knight, g4 black bishop, e4 white pawn, d4 white rook, c4 black knight, h5 white queen, d5 white pawn, h7 black pawn, g7 black rook, e7 black pawn, c7 black pawn, b7 black pawn, a7 black pawn, g8 black king, a8 black rook

Final position
