= Alexander Potapov (chess player) =

Russian chess grandmaster (born 1969)

Personal information
- Born: January 5, 1969 (age 57) Yamalo-Nenets Autonomous Okrug, Soviet Union

Chess career
- Country: Russia
- Title: Grandmaster (2004)
- FIDE rating: 2410 (July 2026)
- Peak rating: 2530 (January 2004)

Alexander Yurievich Potapov is a Russian chess grandmaster.

== Chess career ==
In 2003 he tied for 1st–3rd with Evgenij Miroshnichenko and Yuri Yakovich in the Fakel Jamala tournament in Noyabrsk.

In August 2010, he served as the coach for the Russian players in the U20 World Junior Chess Championships.

In July 2019, he played for the Russian Yamal team in the Cesky Lev Kolesovice Open, where he also had the best individual score of 7/7.

In April 2021, he won an award for being one of Russia's best chess coaches for 2019-2020.
