= Mikhail Kobalia =

Russian chess grandmaster (born 1978)

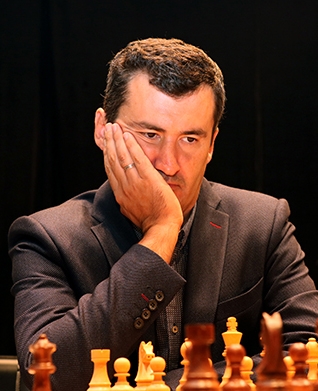
- Mikhail Kobalia at Superfinal of the Russian Chess Championship, Satka, 2018

Personal information
- Born: Михаил Кобалия; May 3, 1978 (age 48)

Chess career
- Country: Russia (until 2022); FIDE (since 2022)
- Title: Grandmaster (1996)
- FIDE rating: 2529 (July 2026)
- Peak rating: 2679 (May 2011)
- Peak ranking: No. 36 (July 2003)

Mikhail Robertovich Kobalia (Михаил Робертович Кобалия; born May 3, 1978) is a Russian chess Grandmaster (1997).

Together with 43 other Russian elite chess players, Kobalia signed an open letter to Russian president Vladimir Putin, protesting against the 2022 Russian invasion of Ukraine and expressing solidarity with the Ukrainian people.

== Chess career ==
In 1994 he won European Youth Chess Championship (U16) in Guarapuava. In 2001 was clear first in the Chigorin Memorial at St. Petersburg. In 2005 came first in the Masters Open Tournament in Biel. In 2007, he tied for 1st–6th with Vitali Golod, Mateusz Bartel, Yuri Yakovich, Michael Roiz and Zahar Efimenko in the 16th Monarch Assurance Isle of Man International tournament. In 2009 he tied for 9th–11th with Boris Grachev and Tomi Nybäck in the European Individual Chess Championship in Budva. In 2010 he tied for 1st–2nd with Manuel León Hoyos in the Arctic Chess Challenge. He took part in the Chess World Cup 2011, but was eliminated in the first round by Igor Lysyj. In the 2016 Aeroflot Open, he tied 3rd-10th with Vladimir Fedoseev, Gata Kamsky, Daniil Dubov, Mateusz Bartel, Sanan Sjugirov, Maxim Matlakov, and Vadim Zvaginsev.

== Notable games ==
- Mikhail Kobalia vs Michael Adams, FIDE WCh KO 2001, King's Indian Attack: Yugoslav Variation (A07), 1/2-1/2
- Mikhail Kobalia vs Ante Brkic, 10th European Championship 2009, Sicilian Defense: Modern Variations (B50), 1-0
