= Aryan Gholami =

Iranian chess grandmaster (born 2001)

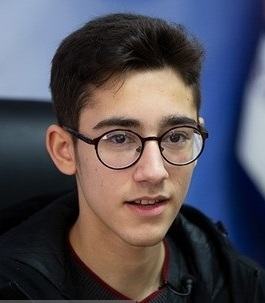

Personal information
- Born: July 26, 2001 (age 25) Sari, Iran

Chess career
- Country: Iran
- Title: Grandmaster (2020)
- FIDE rating: 2472 (October 2026)
- Peak rating: 2554 (October 2019)

Aryan Gholami (Persian: آرین غلامی; born 26 July 2001) is an Iranian chess grandmaster.

== Chess career ==
In November 2009, Gholami won the U8 section of the World Youth Chess Championship.

In 2015, Gholami was part of the Iranian team that won the Youth & Cadets Chess World Championship.

In February 2019, Gholami met with Iranian supreme leader Ali Khamenei after refusing to play against Israeli opponent Ariel Erenberg at the Rilton Cup Chess Tournament in Sweden. Gholami's refusal to play cost him the win in the tournament, but received praise from Khamenei.

In October 2019, Gholami was the tournament leader after the 7th round of the U18 World Youth Chess Championship.
