= Evgenij Miroshnichenko =

Ukrainian chess grandmaster (born 1978)

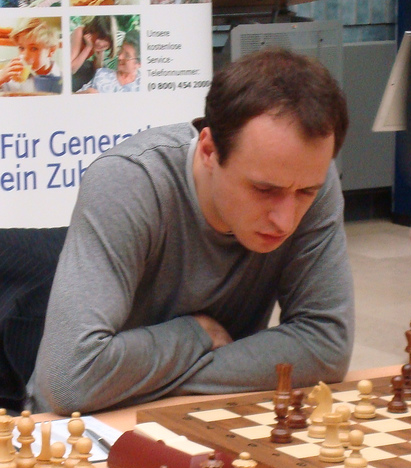
- Miroshnichenko at the 2008 Bundesliga

Personal information
- Born: 28 December 1978 (age 47) Donetsk, Ukrainian SSR, Soviet Union

Chess career
- Country: Ukraine
- Title: Grandmaster (2002)
- FIDE rating: 2588 (July 2026)
- Peak rating: 2696 (July 2009)
- Peak ranking: No. 37 (July 2009)

Evgenij Vitaliyovych Miroshnichenko (also Yevhen; Ukrainian: Євген Віталійович Мірошниченко; born 28 December 1978) is a Ukrainian chess player. He was awarded the title of Grandmaster by FIDE in 2002.

Miroshnichenko won the Ukrainian Chess Championship in 2003 and 2008. Also in 2003 he tied for 1st–3rd with Yuri Yakovich and Alexander Potapov in the Fakel Jamala tournament in Noyabrsk. In 2005 Miroshnichenko competed in the FIDE World Cup. At the 2008 European Club Cup, he scored 4½/5 points to win the individual gold medal on board six, as well as helping his team Kiev place third. In 2009 he tied for first with Alexander Areshchenko, Humpy Koneru and Magesh Panchanathan in the Mumbai Mayor Cup.

Miroshnichenko did English language commentary for several FIDE official events: Chess Olympiad, Women's World Chess Championship, FIDE World Cup, Candidates' Tournament, World Team Chess Championship, World Rapid and Blitz Championships, FIDE Grand Prix, FIDE Women's Grand Prix, Women's Candidates Tournament.

In 2014, he was awarded the title of FIDE Senior Trainer. Miroshnichenko trained, among others, Anna Muzychuk, Mariya Muzychuk and the Iranian team.
