= Zurich Christmas Open =

Annual chess tournament in Zürich, Switzerland

The Zurich Christmas Open (German: Weihnachtsopen Zürich) is an annual chess tournament that takes place in Zürich, Switzerland. The tournament began in 1977 and has been held 48 consecutive times.

The tournament has been won four times by Vladimir Tukmakov and Josef Klinger.

== Winners ==
#	Year	Master Tournament	Main Tournament
1	1977	Radovan Govedarica YUG	only one category
2	1978	Werner Hug SUI	only one category
3	1979	Petar Popovic YUG	Trauth M. GER
4	1980	Radoslav Simic YUG	Koronghy J. HUN
5	1981	Dragutin Sahovic YUG	Payrits H. AUT
6	1982	Gyula Sax HUN	Baldauf M. GER
7	1983	Jaime Sunye Neto BRA	Maillard SUI
8	1984	Stefan Kindermann GER	Bellamaric S. YUG
9	1985	Josef Klinger AUT	Frick R. LIE
10	1986	Josef Klinger AUT	Zaja I. YUG
11	1987	Lubomir Neckar CSR	Potterat M. SUI
12	1988	Josef Klinger AUT	Mella L. SUI
13	1989	Heinz Wirthensohn SUI	Ribic K. YUG
14	1990	Josef Klinger AUT	Kozarcanin S. YUG
15	1991	Jacob Murey FRA	Fischer L. SUI
16	1992	Reinhard Lendwai AUT	Fehr D. SUI
17	1993	Vadim Milov ISR	Rosing H. GER
18	1994	Vladimir Tukmakov UKR	Kajtez M. YUG
19	1995	Vladimir Tukmakov UKR	Cruceli S. SUI
20	1996	Georg Siegel GER	Gojani G. SUI
21	1997	Nedeljko Kelecevic BIH	Bütler M. SUI
22	1998	Vladimir Tukmakov UKR	Wittwer M. SUI
23	1999	Vladimir Tukmakov UKR	Agushi A. SUI
24	2000	Vladimir Epishin GER	Jashari E. SUI
25	2001	Yannick Pelletier SUI	Hana A. GER
26	2002	Yannick Pelletier SUI	Tikvic N. SUI
27	2003	Stanislav Savchenko UKR	Remata V. SUI
28	2004	Aloyzas Kveinys LIT	Hirt M. SUI
29	2005	Zoltán Varga HUN	Pfau M. GER
30	2006	Yannick Pelletier SUI	Joller H. SUI
31	2007	Florian Jenni SUI	Gabersek A. SUI
32	2008	Héra Imre HUN	Wegelin R. SUI
33	2009	Leonid Milov GER	Ristevski S. SUI
34	2010	Georg Meier GER	Stucki R. SUI
35	2011	Igor Kurnosov RUS	Künzli T. SUI
36	2012	Levente Vajda ROM	Boskovic M. SRB
37	2013	Radosław Wojtaszek POL	Schweighoffer M. SUI
38	2014	Arkadij Naiditsch GER	Grünberger M. SRB
39	2015	Arkadij Naiditsch GER	Mansoor S. SUI
40	2016	Nijat Abasov AZE	Bhunjun R. SUI
41	2017	Christian Bauer FRA	Hauser R. SUI
42	2018	Haik M. Martirosyan ARM	Mesut Altok GER
43	2019	Vitaly Kunin GER	Dorian Asllani SUI
44	2020	Mikhail Demidov	only one category due to being held online
45	2021	Vitaly Kunin GER	Flavio Rotunno SUI
46	2022	Milos Perunovic SRB	Nicolas Bourg LUX
47	2023	Krishnan Sasikiran IND	Sebastian Kraus GER
48	2024	Sergey Fedorchuk UKR	Mirko Mikavica SRB
49	2025	Sergey Fedorchuk UKR	Robert Matei SUI
