= Ariel Erenberg =

Israeli chess player (born 2001)

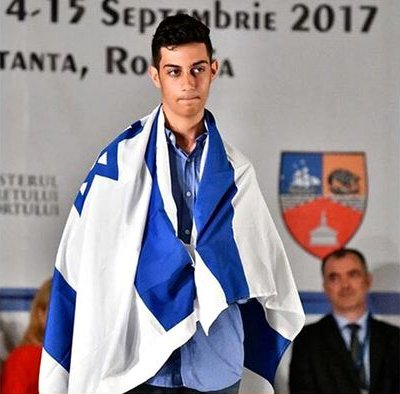
- Erenberg, European Championship 2017

Personal information
- Native name: אריאל ארנברג
- Born: October 11, 2001 (age 24) Rishon LeZion, Israel

Chess career
- Country: Israel
- Title: International Master (2017)
- FIDE rating: 2482 (July 2026)
- Peak rating: 2521 (March 2022)

Ariel Erenberg (Hebrew: אריאל ארנברג; born 11 October 2001) is an Israeli chess player with the title of International Master, and the Israeli champion up to age 18. He was the runner-up in the European Championship under 16 in 2017, and placed third in the European Championship under 18 in 2018.

In 2014, he received the FIDE Master title, and in 2017, he achieved the International Master title, becoming the youngest International Master in Israel.

As of October 2022, he is ranked 14th in Israel, according to the rating list.

== Biography ==
Erenberg is the son of Shmuel (Shmulik) Erenberg, Wolt driver, and Yael Rachmani, a bank clerk. His coaches are the artists: Michael Roiz, Tal Baron, and International Master Asaf Givon. He also works with Grandmaster Ram Soffer.

Since 2015, he has represented the Kfar Saba club in the national league. He resides in Rishon LeZion.

In 2019, the Iranian Aryan Gholami refused to play against Erenberg at the Rilton Cup Chess Tournament in Sweden. His refusal to compete earned him a meeting with Ali Khamenei.

== Prominent Achievements ==
The following are some of Erenberg's notable achievements:

2009 - Won first place in the Israeli Championship under 8, held in Kfar Saba, after scoring 7 points out of 7 possible.

2011 - Finished second in the Israeli Championship under 10, held in Petah Tikva, after scoring 7 points out of 9 possible.

2013 - Finished third in the Israeli Championship under 12, held in Petah Tikva, after scoring 6.5 points out of 9 possible.

2013 - Won first place in the 19th Maccabiah open tournament, held in Jerusalem before he turned 12.

2014 - Won first place in the Israeli Championship under 14, after scoring 8.5 points out of 9 possible.

2014 - At age 13, finished fifth in the European Championship under 14.

2015 - Finished second in the Israeli Championship under 14, after scoring 7 points out of 9 possible.

2015 - Won first place in a closed tournament for Grandmaster norms, after scoring 5.5 points out of 9 possible, despite being initially ranked last.

2016 - Part of the Israeli team that won the European Youth Championship under 18.

2017 - Won a silver medal in the European Championship under 16, held in Romania, after scoring 7.5 points out of 9 possible.

2018 - Won a bronze medal in the European Championship under 18, held in Riga, Latvia, after scoring 6.5 points out of 9 possible.
