= Yuri Yakovich =

Russian chess grandmaster (born 1962)

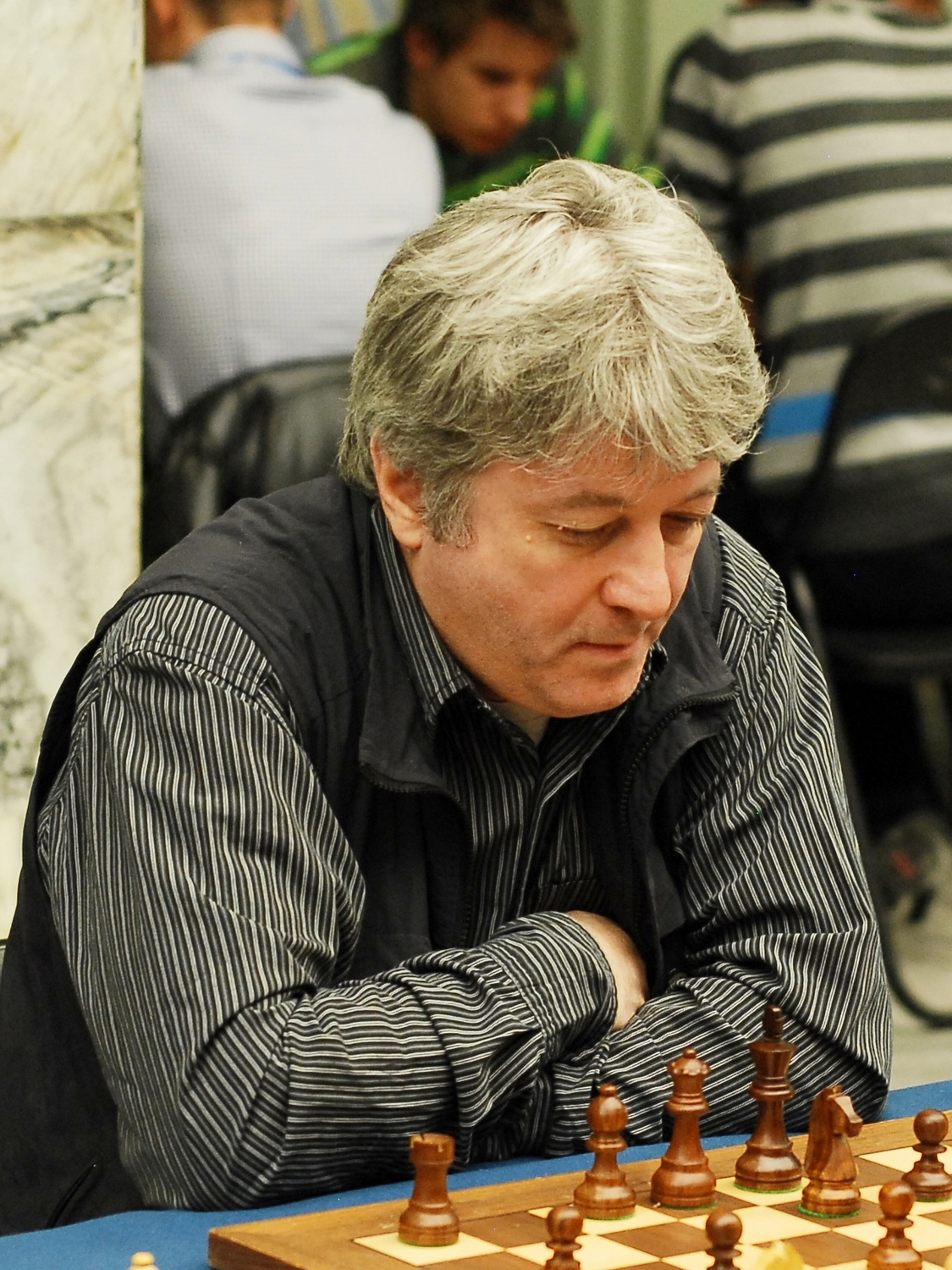
- Yuri Yakovich, Warsaw 2012

Personal information
- Born: November 30, 1962 (age 63) Kuybyshev

Chess career
- Country: Soviet Union; Russia
- Title: Grandmaster (1990)
- FIDE rating: 2513 (July 2026)
- Peak rating: 2610 (July 1997)

Yuri Rafailovich Yakovich (Russian: Юрий Рафаилович Якович; born November 30, 1962) is a Russian chess player. He was awarded the title of Grandmaster by FIDE in 1990. He was a member of the silver medal-winning Russian team at the 1997 European Team Chess Championship. In 2019, Yakovich was part of the Russian team that won the gold medal at the European Senior Team Championship in the 50+ category.

In 2003 he tied for 1st–3rd with Evgenij Miroshnichenko and Alexander Potapov in the Fakel Jamala tournament in Noyabrsk. In 2007, he tied for 1st–6th with Vitali Golod, Mateusz Bartel, Mikhail Kobalia, Michael Roiz and Zahar Efimenko in the 16th Monarch Assurance Isle of Man International tournament.

Yakovich is the author of the books Play the 4 f3 Nimzo-Indian, published by Gambit Publications in 2004, and Sicilian Attacks, published by New In Chess in 2010.

In 2021, the German Chess Federation named Yakovich the coach of their women's national team. He coached the team during the 44th Chess Olympiad in Chennai, India.

== Notable games ==
- Yuri Yakovich vs Vladimir Kramnik, USSR 1988, Sicilian Defense: Four Knights. Exchange Variation (B40), 1-0
- Yuri Yakovich vs David Bronstein, It (open) 1994, Queen's Gambit Accepted: Classical Defense (D26), 1-0
- Yuri Yakovich vs Magnus Carlsen, Bergen 2002, Queen's Indian Defense: Kasparov-Petrosian Variation (E12), 1-0
