= Foro Interno =

- Discipline: Political theory
- Language: Spanish
- Edited by: Javier Roiz

Publication details
- History: 2001-present
- Publisher: Servicio de Publicaciones (Universidad Complutense de Madrid) (Spain)
- Frequency: Annually
- Open access: Yes

Standard abbreviations
- ISO 4: Foro Interno

Indexing
- ISSN: 1578-4576 (print); 1988-2920 (web)
- LCCN: 2011213517
- OCLC no.: 841758581

Links
- Journal homepage; Online access; Online archive

Foro Interno: Anuario de Teoría Política is an open access peer-reviewed academic journal covering political theory that was established in 2000. The editor-in-chief is Javier Roiz (Complutense University of Madrid). The journal was established with the support of the Universidad Complutense de Madrid, the Universidad de Salamanca, and the Universidad de Alicante. Since 2004, it is published by the Servicio de Publicaciones (Universidad Complutense de Madrid). It appears annually, in December, in both paper and electronic format. The journal is abstracted and indexed in Difusión y Calidad Editorial (DICE), Dialnet, Latindex, International Bibliography of the Social Sciences, and the Philosopher's Index.

Foro Interno has also published relevant books as the Colección Rétor. The first book was published in 2002. This collection of books was integrated into the catalogue of the Servicio de Publicaciones de la Universidad Complutense in 2007, within the Key Thinkers Collection, which has since published two more books.
