= Michael Roiz =

Israeli chess grandmaster (born 1983)

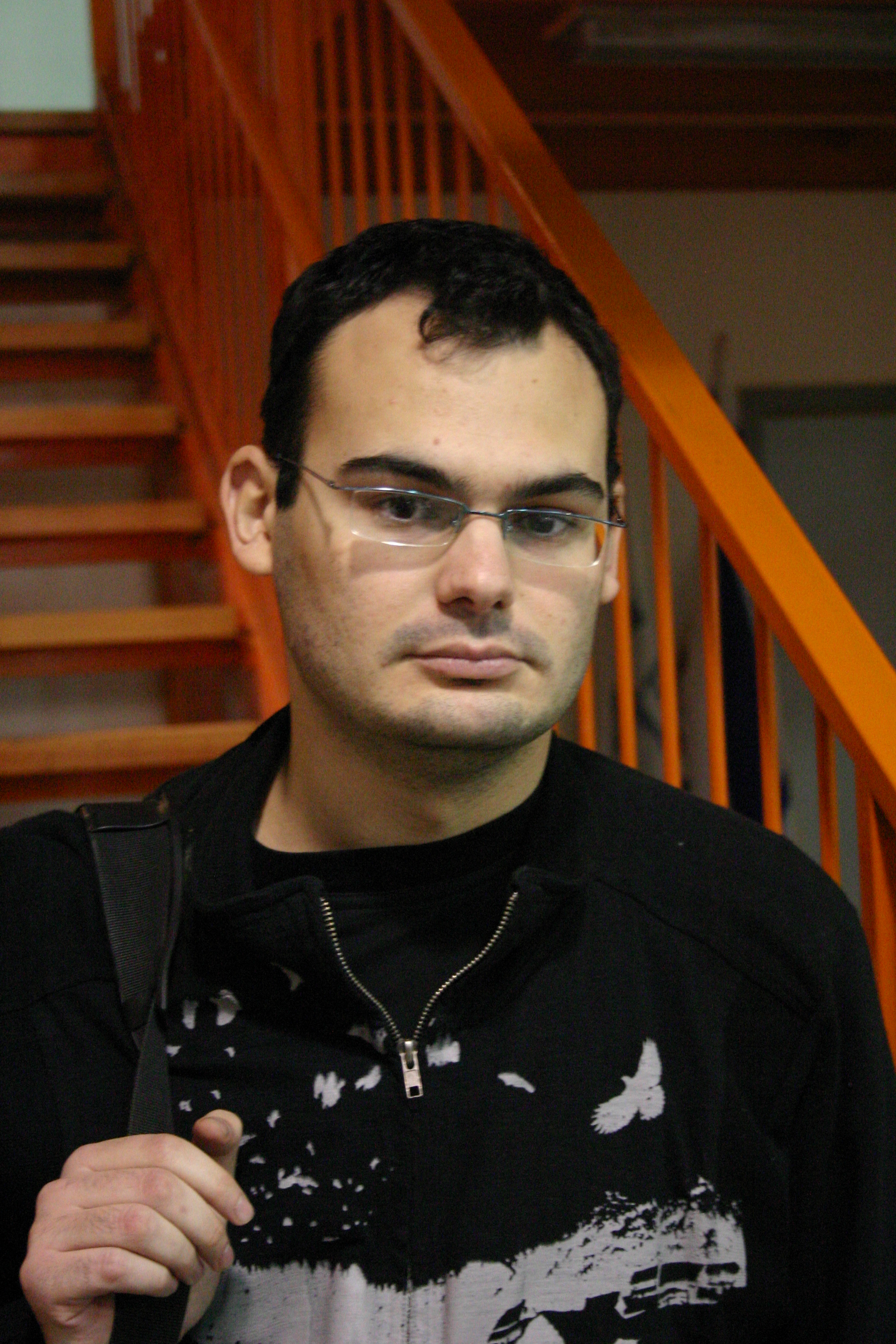
- Roiz at the Israeli Championship 2008 finals, Haifa, December 2008

Personal information
- Born: 12 October 1983 (age 43) Saratov, Russia

Chess career
- Country: Russia (until 1995); Israel (since 1995)
- Title: Grandmaster (2003)
- FIDE rating: 2564 (November 2026)
- Peak rating: 2680 (July 2008)
- Peak ranking: No. 40 (July 2008)

Michael Roiz (Russian: Михаил Евгеньевич Ройз, Hebrew: מיכאל רויז; born 12 October 1983 in Russia) is an Israeli chess Grandmaster.

== Career ==
He learned to play chess at the age of 7. At 9, he finished 2nd in the national championship under-10 category. In 1995 he moved to Israel, becoming an IM in 1999 at 16 and a GM in 2003. He was a former top 40 grandmaster.

His best tournament achievements since have been: 1–3 in Ashdod op 2004; 1–6 in Zürich op 2004; 2–4 with Mikhail Gurevich and Vitali Golod with 7/9 at the Saint Vincent op 2004; 3–5 with 8/10 at the Benasque op 2005; 1–2 with Suat Atalık at the Gorenje Valjevo Tournament 2007; 2–3 with Radosław Wojtaszek at Lublin op 2009.

He has won several blitz and rapid tournaments, such as Biel 2006, Biel Blitz 2010 and 2014 or the Oberwart Blitz 2005. At the Gibraltar Masters in 2007, he shared 5th place in a very strong field, behind GMs Vladimir Akopian, Alexander Areshchenko, Hikaru Nakamura, and Emil Sutovsky. In the same year he tied for 1st–6th with Vitali Golod, Mateusz Bartel, Yuri Yakovich, Zahar Efimenko and Mikhail Kobalia in the 16th Monarch Assurance Isle of Man International tournament.

He was a member of the Israeli national team in Plovdiv 2003, (team silver medal); Calvià 2004 (the 36th Chess Olympiad), and Beer-Sheva World Team Chess Championship 2005.

In 2005, he qualified for the World Cup in Khanty-Mansiysk 2005, but lost to Alexander Motylev ½–1½.

In 2012, he became a second for the World Championship Challenger Boris Gelfand.

He is also a chess coach. Among his prominent students is the international player Ariel Erenberg.
