= Javier Roiz =

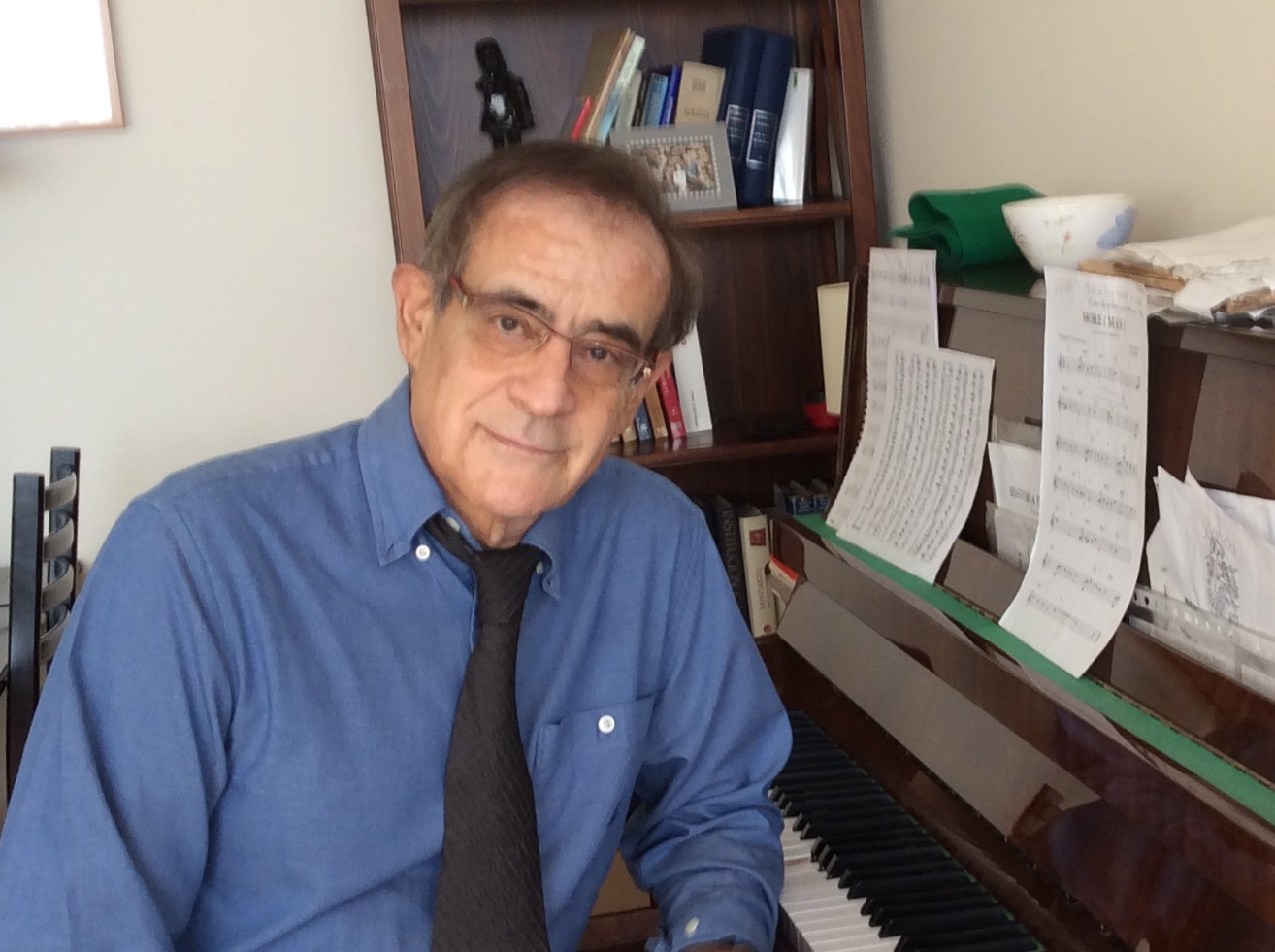
Javier Roiz Parra

Javier Roiz is the founder of the journal Foro Interno. Anuario de Teoría Política, and "one of the most original thinkers in Europe today". He also founded a Permanent Research Seminar which, since 1992, has brought together important researchers and students of political theory.

Born in Madrid, he became Full Professor of Political Theory at the Universidad Complutense in 1995, where he still teaches. He has also held teaching and research positions at Princeton University, the Sigmund Freud Institut in Frankfurt, Wesleyan University, Saint Louis University, Universidad Central de Venezuela-CIPOST and Universitat Rovira i Virgili. Among his intellectual mentors are Harry Eckstein, Manfred Halpern, José A. Rodríguez Piedrabuena and Sheldon S. Wolin.

In the 1980s, he helped advance empirical political science in the Spanish language, with books such as Introducción a la Ciencia Política and Ciencia Política, hoy.

== The vigilant society ==
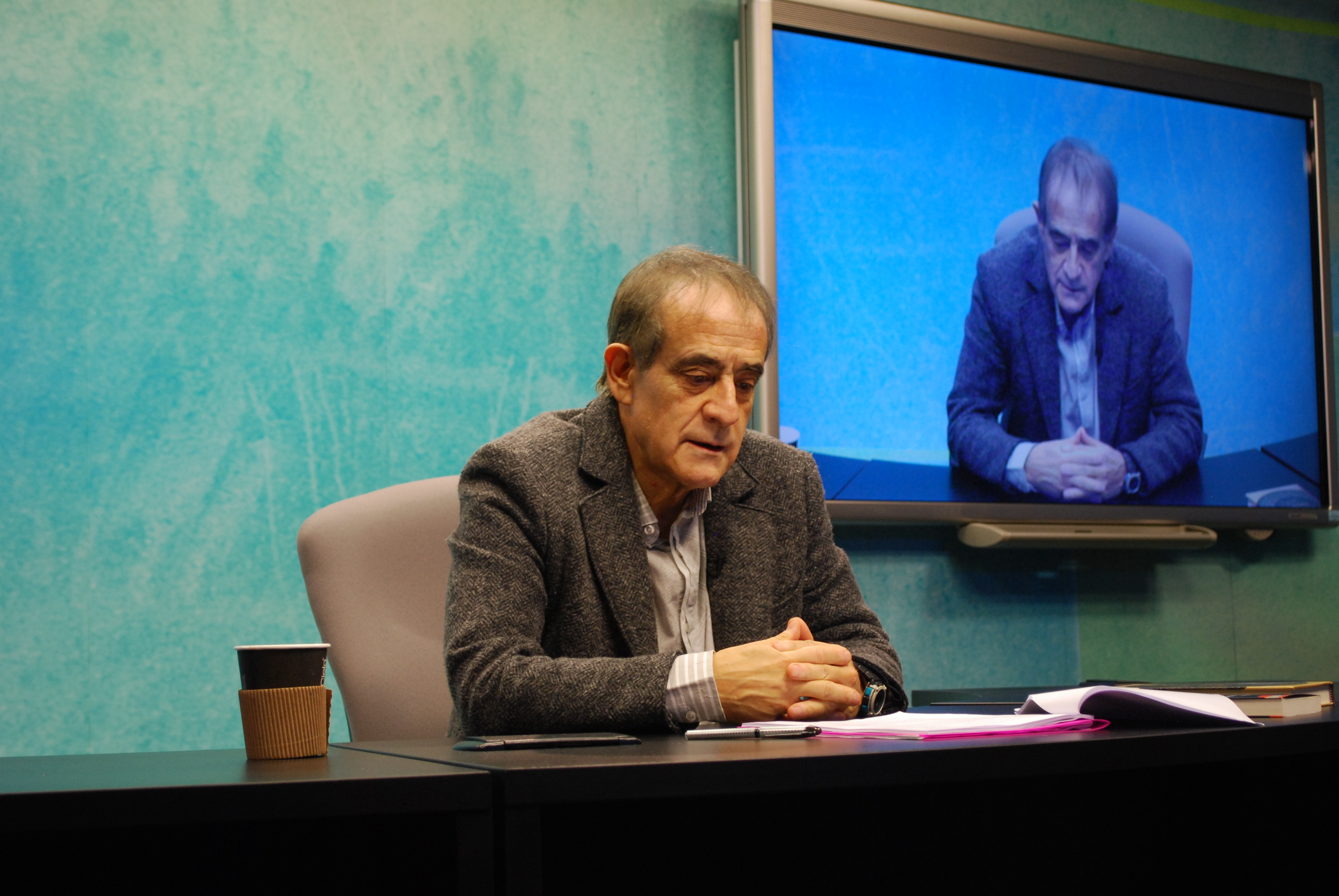
Presenting the book The Vigilant Society at Tec de Monterrey, Mexico City campus

Roiz understands contemporary society as a vigilant society that has its roots in 13th century Western Europe. Parallel to gothic art, this society of citizens originated in Bourgogne and extended primarily to England, the Iberian Peninsula and the Rhine River Basin; while in Italy its influence was only felt down to Milan.

For the citizens of vigilant societies (i) life is a continual battle, (ii) Scientia potestas est, knowledge is power (Francis Bacon, 1561–1626), (iii) history moves forward unstoppably, (iv) the final solution to all problems is continually sought, (v) democratic trials are degraded and taken as discrimination, and the figure of judge is confused with that of referee and (vi) idols are recurred to as instruments of political engineering. Scientific neutrality is thus pursued by identifying mental activity with thinking. According to Roiz, this ignores the fact that obsessions and phobias, be they ever so active, not only are not thought, but they impede thinking.

Javier Roiz emphasizes the schematic and dogmatic version of Aristotelianism prevalent in 16th-century Europe. During this century, baroque Christian culture consolidated two great Aristotelian dogmas: (i) the privatization of the internal world of men and (ii) the absolute affirmation of the principle of identity. Thomas Aquinas (c. 1225–1274) and Thomas Hobbes (1588–1679) agree upon these points in their work, with coinciding results.

== Vigilance and lethargy ==
Roiz understands the State, which emerged from the so-called gothic era, as the most successful western franchise in the history of Europe. The vigilant citizen is characterized by efforts to purge the hours of lethargy from life, to the point of virtually eliminating them. This medieval Christian tradition prevailed both in the Roman Catholic sphere (Ramon de Penyafort [1232–1316], Thomas Aquinas) and the Calvinist sphere (Petrus Ramus [1515–1572], Thomas Hobbes). Lethargy was associated with anesthesia, a human condition similar to death, or the incapacity to think or act intelligently – in sum, with time that is lost or wasted. Thus, vigilance became scientifically and morally hegemonic and internal public spaces were virtually erased. Vestiges of these spaces can be found in colloquial expressions such as the Spanish mi fuero interno or the French mon for interieur.

In order to construct the State, Javier Roiz proposes that the rhetoric which provided contingency in public life had to be neutralized. From this emerged a dialectic without rhetoric – something that had been unthinkable until then. Once the inventio of rhetoric had been transferred to dialectics, the idea of knowing as a dialectic activity established itself in Europe. This approach was already prevalent in medieval colleges and schools due to the methodological imposition of the scholastic ars disputatrix in the 13th century. Rhetoric could then be identified with a mere adornment of discourse (ornatus) or with techniques for deception or seduction (ars fallendi).

== The new science ==
Theatre was banished from the university in the 16th century (Petrus Ramus) and a method was established that was free from ambiguity and caprice, armed against the "turpidity" of human passions and interests. This apparently opened the door for political science, a definitive field of knowledge that sought to begin a new era free from scholastic influence. But it is not clear that his political theory could be rationalized.

However, Roiz holds that scholasticism is still alive and thriving. He emphasizes the masterpieces of European literature as guardians of the democratic tradition, which the vigilant society seeks to dismember. In William Shakespeare's Hamlet (1599/1601), Horatio (a character allusive to the orare of rhetoric) survives. In Don Quixote de la Mancha (1605) the protagonist falls in love from what he hears of Dulcinea, in contrast with the visual tradition of Aristotle. In Franz Kafka's (1883–1924) The Trial, Joseph K. fears psychological death (madness) more than physical death.

The gothic tradition segregates man into body and soul. Lex humana does not rule in man's inner being, which has become an opaque space that impedes vision. There, lex divina rules, something which can only be understood by clerics.

The subsequent secular rebellion against this rejects the concept of soul as a public space, vindicating bodies and the corporal scenario of life as the only political matter. Later, the modern militant revolution ultimately proclaimed the absolutism of bodies as the only reality. These are of course the bodies of vigilant citizens with no lethargy.

Roiz recognizes that even Maimonides gave greater importance to the body than to the soul. However, he was referring to unmutilated human bodies: those that span all 24 hours of the day and live in cities with infants, adults and the elderly.

It is not surprising that the vigilant democracy of the 21st century is unable to cope with babies or infants, whose lives are dominated by lethargy.

== The Sephardic tradition ==
In his recent book, A Vigilant Society: Jewish Thought and the State in Medieval Spain (SUNY, 2013), Roiz rescues the richness of Jewish Sephardic thinking and its pedagogic traditions, which have been mangled by the advances of the vigilant world.

He considers the Barcelona Dispute of 1263 to be the decisive moment, when a militant vision of the public sphere became dominant. It destroyed both the enemy on the battlefield, Islam, and the other forms of knowledge and progress in the Mediterranean public sphere, defined by a sea whose shores extend to both Athens and Jerusalem. Maimonides, whose city was "a set of patios and narrow streets" and who based knowledge on hearing, was swept away by a visual understanding of politics in which the centre of common life became the Town Square, or the Aristotelian diaphanous circle. Roiz argues for the recovery of judgment and the trial process. He places at the centre of his thinking the confrontation between Ashkenazi figures, which were represented in Sepharad (Spain) by Moshe ben Nahman Gerondi, Nahmanides (Ramban) (1194–C. 1270) or Shlomo ibn Adret (Rashba) (1235–1310) and Sephardic figures, epitomized by Moshe ben Maimon, Maimonides (Rambam) (1135–1204). As a precursor to the great western transformations, the Book of the Zohar (Séfer ha-zójhar or The Book of Splendor) by Moses de Leon is crucial for understanding this decisive shift.

Another great political thinker who defended and protected lethargy in a world that is overwhelmingly vigilant was Sigmund Freud (1856–1939), with his Studies on Hysteria (1895) and The Interpretation of Dreams (1899). In his maturity, Freud turned towards the Mediterranean and towards Sepharad, as did Leo Strauss and Hannah Arendt. Freud understood the public roots of human pain as did Maimonides, both of whom were doctors and deep thinkers. Roiz suggests that psychoanalysis emulates the Sephardic pedagogical tradition, which Maimonides described as teaching persons individually at a certain level.

== The recovery of rhetoric ==
The unanimous effort to discredit rhetoric by ignoring thinkers such as Marco Fabio Quintiliano (30 d.C.-96) and Giambattista Vico (1668–1744) and the loss of the Sephardic tradition are consequences of this twisting of politics that has involved Catholic, Reformed and secular thinkers of the vigilant society. The constant historicism of gothic thinking, the establishment of the omnipotence of thinking –with its obsession for final solutions– and idolatry as the usual method of political engineering (as is the case with nationalism and the State) are points that Roiz highlights in his works.

He suggests that this has helped to undermine current political theory, as manifested in the demise of vigilant ideologies and in the catastrophic and homicidal experience of the 20th century. Consequently, political theory is stuck in a labyrinth of omnipotence and must find a way out in order to recover its scientific capacity and democratic value.

Javier Roiz calls for a new, 21st century citizen who incorporates both vigilance and lethargy into life. Establishing a more realistic identity for such citizens would require ending the prohibition in political theory regarding exploring in foro interno. He draws attention to the key distinction between red and green memory, between vigilant forgetfulness (amnesia and amnesty) and genuine forgetfulness. Based on these ideas, Roiz considers fundamental both literary and musical composition, his own and those of others, alongside his scientific works.

== Works ==
- Introducción a la Ciencia Política. Análisis crítico de la Teoría Empírica Contemporánea, Vicens-Vivens, Barcelona, 1980. 228 pages. ISBN 84-316-1891-4
- Ciencia Política, hoy, Editorial Teide, Barcelona, 1982. 249 pages. ISBN 84-307-7426-2
- Comp. with Paul E. Sigmund, Poder, Sociedad y Estado en USA, Teide, Barcelona, 1986. 327 pages. ISBN 84-307-7447-5
- El experimento moderno. Política y psicología al final del siglo XX, Editorial Trotta, Madrid, 1992. 226 pages. ISBN 84-87699-30-8
- El gen democrático, Editorial Trotta, Madrid, 1996. 245 pages. ISBN 84-8164-121-9
- La democracia vigilante, Caracas, CIPOST, 1998. 71 pages. ISBN 980-07-5471-7
- Viaje a la gloria y a la intemperie, Editorial Foro Interno, Colección Rétor, Madrid, 2002. 845 pages. ISBN 84-607-4352-7
- La Recuperación del Buen Juicio. Teoría política en el siglo veinte, Editorial Foro Interno, Colección Rétor, Madrid, 2003. 378 pages. ISBN 84-933478-0-9
- Sociedad vigilante y mundo judío en la concepción del Estado, Editorial Complutense, en coedición con la Asociación Foro Interno, Madrid, 2008. 342 pages. ISBN 978-84-7491-931-8
- A Vigilant Society: Jewish Thought and the State in Medieval Spain, trans. by Selma L. Margaretten, SUNY Press, Albany, 2013. ISBN 978-1-4384-4563-2
- El mundo interno y la política, Plaza y Valdés, Madrid-México, 2013. ISBN 9788415271734 . (Abstract, Summary and Introduction).
