= Mykhaylo Oleksiyenko =

Ukrainian chess grandmaster (born 1986)

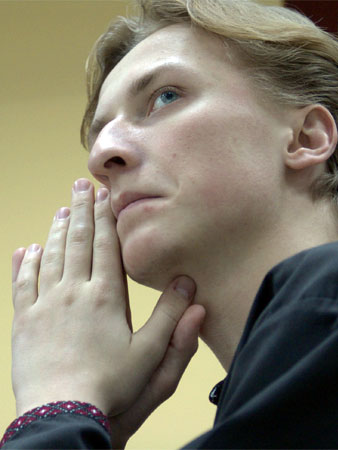

Personal information
- Born: Mykhaylo Volodymyrovych Oleksiyenko; 30 September 1986 (age 39) Lviv, Ukrainian SSR, Soviet Union

Chess career
- Country: Ukraine
- Title: Grandmaster (2005)
- FIDE rating: 2558 (July 2026)
- Peak rating: 2643 (January 2015)

Mykhaylo Volodymyrovych Oleksiyenko, or Mykhailo Oleksiienko (Ukrainian: Михайло Олексієнко; born 30 September 1986) is a Ukrainian chess grandmaster. He was Ukrainian Chess Champion in 2016.

== Chess career ==
Oleksiyenko was awarded the title of Grandmaster by FIDE in 2005. He finished first in the Summer Olomouc Open in 2005, Breizh Masters tournament in 2006 and 2007, and Instalplast Open in 2006. In 2014 Oleksiyenko tied for first with Baadur Jobava and Sergey Fedorchuk, placing third on tiebreak, in the David Bronstein Memorial in Minsk. In 2015, he won the Karen Asrian Memorial in Jermuk with a score of 7/9 points, edging out Anton Korobov and Samvel Ter-Sahakyan on tiebreaks.

In 2016, Oleksiyenko won the Ukrainian Chess Championship.

== Other achievements ==
In 2008 Oleksiyenko graduated from the faculty of mechanics and mathematics at Ivan Franko Lviv National University. In 2012, he received a Ph.D. in mathematics.
