= Sébastien Feller =

French chess grandmaster (born 1991)

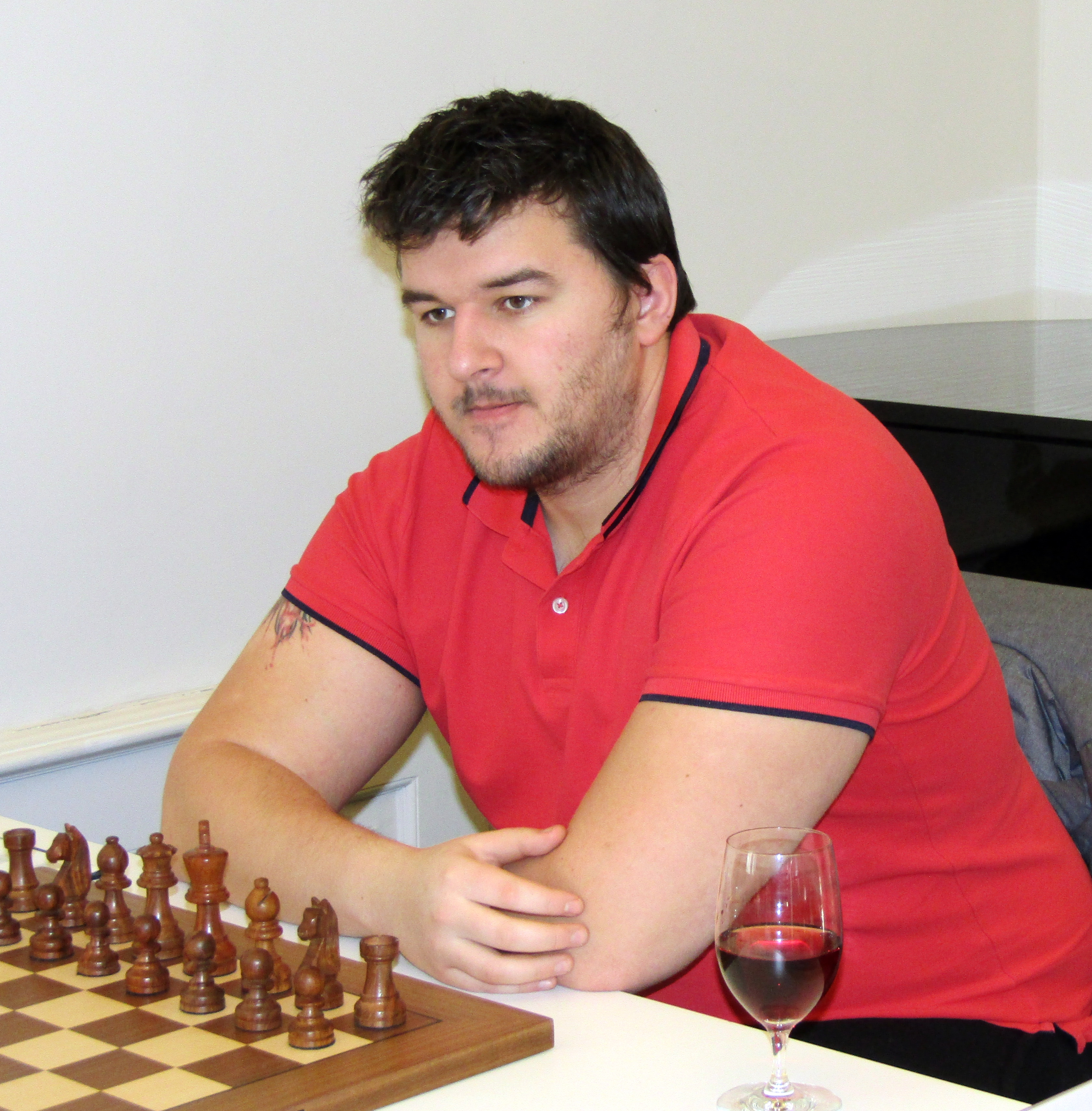
- Feller in 2017

Personal information
- Born: 11 March 1991 (age 35) Thionville, France

Chess career
- Country: France
- Title: Grandmaster (2007)
- FIDE rating: 2546 (July 2026)
- Peak rating: 2668 (September 2011)
- Peak ranking: No. 77 (September 2011)

Sébastien Feller (born 11 March 1991) is a French chess grandmaster. He was found guilty of cheating by the French Chess Federation (FFE) and sanctioned in 2012 by not being allowed to participate in FIDE tournaments for 2 years and 9 months. He denied the charges and said they were motivated by a dispute over the direction of the French Chess Federation. In 2019, he was sentenced by a French court to a suspended 6-months prison sentence because of the cheating.

== Biography ==
Sébastien Feller was born in Thionville, France, on 11 March 1991.

== Chess career ==
Feller achieved both his International Master and Grandmaster titles in 2007 at age 17. He won the French Junior Championship 2007 and was vice-champion of the European U16 Championships 2007. He played as the first reserve for France in the European Team Championships 2009 held in Novi Sad, Serbia, scoring +4 =4 -1. He was also French Blitz Champion in 2010 and winner of the Paris championship in July 2010. In 2010, he represented France in the 39th Chess Olympiad in Khanty-Mansiysk, Russia, where he was sanctioned for cheating by the French Chess Federation (FFE).

=== Chess Olympiad cheating allegations ===
In October 2010, Feller scored 6/9 (+5 =2 -2) during the 39th Chess Olympiad and won the Gold medal for best individual performance on board 5. However, the FFE accused Feller, along with French players GM Arnaud Hauchard and IM Cyril Marzolo, of cheating during the Olympiad. While Feller was in the playing hall, Marzolo was in France where he checked the best moves with a chess computer. Marzolo then allegedly sent the move in coded pairs of numbers by text message to Hauchard. Once Hauchard had the suggested move, he would position himself in the hall behind one of the other players’ tables in a predefined coded system, where each table represented a move to play. The FFE claims, in all, 200 text messages were sent during the tournament. The scam was supposedly uncovered by FFE vice-president Joanna Pomian.

Feller released a statement (in French) in defense of himself:

I completely deny the charges of cheating imposed by the French Chess Federation. This disciplinary proceeding is actually related to the fact that I supported, at the time of the Chess Olympiad, the current president of FIDE [Kirsan Ilyumzhinov] in opposition with the current direction of the French Chess Federation.

The President of FIDE is defamed on the blog of Jean-Claude Moingt, which claims that he profited from fictitious proxies. Moreover, at that time I spoke in private conversations, which were repeated, of countable irregularities of the French Chess Federation (of which the precise details will be given later), which angered the FFE President.

I asked my lawyer, Mr Charles Morel, to take legal action in damages against the French Chess Federation for an unjustified quote of my name in an official statement, taken again on all the French and foreign websites, as well as in the international press.

The FFE took disciplinary measures against the three players. These measures were later revoked by a French civil court. In July 2012 the FIDE Ethic Commission sanctioned all three players and ruled "Mr. Sébastien FELLER has to be sanctioned with the exclusion from the participation in all FIDE tournaments, as a player or as a member of a national delegation, for a period of 2 (two) years and 9 (nine) months, starting from the 1st of August 2012".

On 28 May 2019, the correctional tribunal of Thionville sentenced Feller to a suspended sentence of 6 months in prison because he cheated at the 39th Chess Olympiad. According to the tribunal, his behavior amounted to the crime of escroquerie (fraud). After serving his ban, Feller returned to active tournament play.

== Notable games ==
- David Howell vs Sébastien Feller, Khanty Mansiysk 2010, 0-1
- Sébastien Feller - Robert Markus, Khanty Mansiysk 2010, 1-0
- Sébastien Feller - Tamaz Gelashvili, Khanty Mansiysk 2010, 1-0
- Ivan Morovic-Fernandez - Sébastien Feller, Aeroflot Open 2010, 0-1
- Artyom Timofeev - Sébastien Feller, Khanty Mansiysk 2010, 0-1
- Sébastien Feller - Andrei Volokitin, Aix-les-Bains 2011, 1-0

== Others ==
Feller's FIDE ranking has been suspended following the judgment of the FIDE Ethic Commission. In January 2012 he was listed the last time in the top 100 published by FIDE at position 95.

His handle on the Internet Chess Club is "GodSebFeller". His handle on Lichess is "CtFletch57".
