= Vladimir Potkin =

Russian chess grandmaster (born 1982)

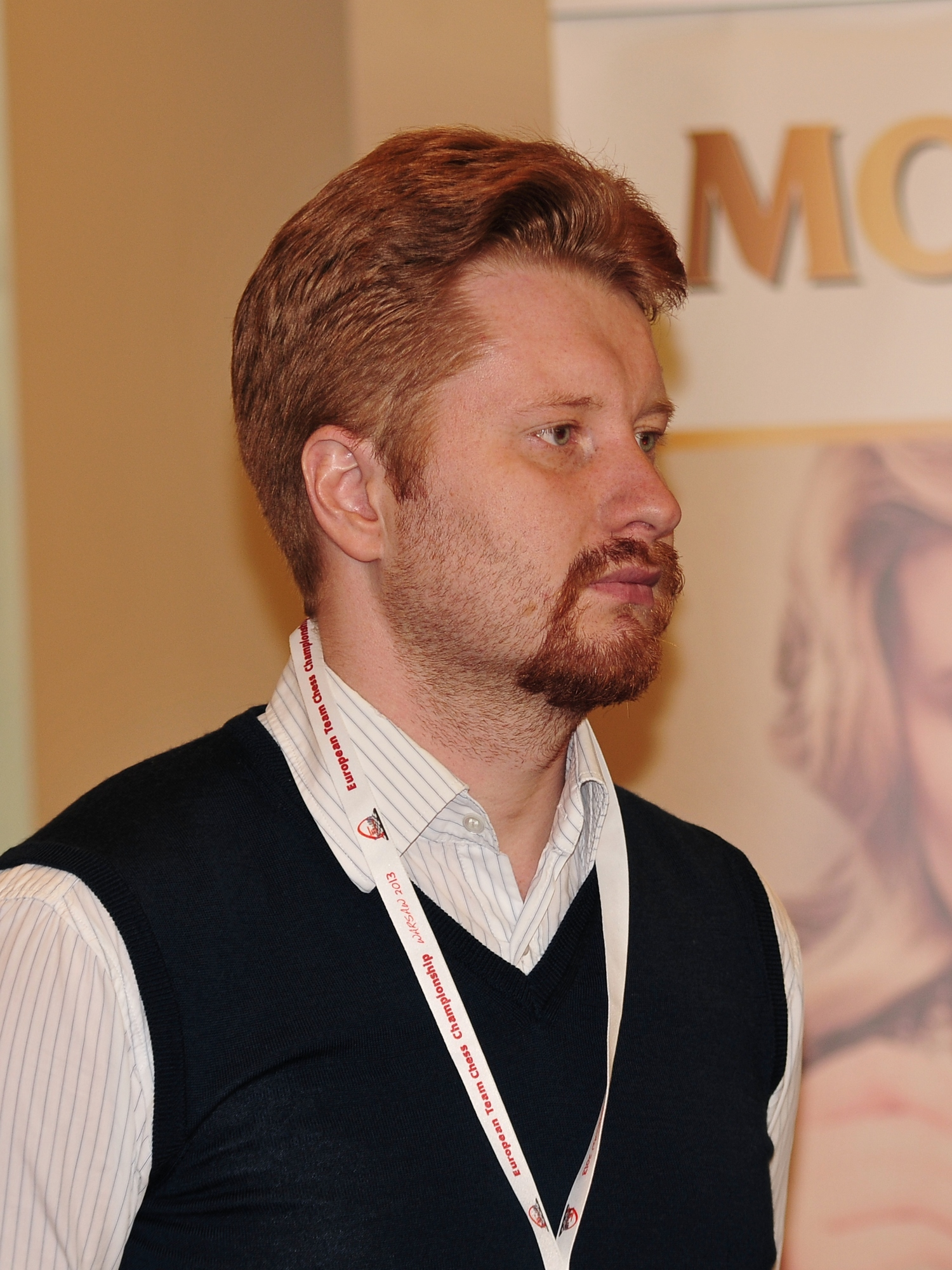
- Vladimir Potkin, Warsaw 2013

Personal information
- Born: 28 June 1982 (age 44)

Chess career
- Country: Russia
- Title: Grandmaster (2001)
- FIDE rating: 2548 (July 2026)
- Peak rating: 2684 (November 2011)
- Peak ranking: No. 52 (May 2011)

Vladimir Alekseevich Potkin (Russian: Владимир Поткин; born 28 June 1982) is a Russian chess grandmaster (2001) and a former European champion. He is also Ian Nepomniachtchi's trainer and one of the coaches of the Russian national team.

== Career ==
Potkin tied for second with Dimitrios Mastrovasilis at the 2000 European Under-18 championship and took the bronze medal on tiebreak. In 2007 he tied for 1st–9th with Alexei Fedorov, Andrei Deviatkin, Aleksej Aleksandrov, Viacheslav Zakhartsov, Alexander Evdokimov, Denis Khismatullin, Evgeny Tomashevsky and Sergei Azarov in the Aratovsky Memorial in Saratov. In 2009 Poktin finished second in the category 14 Premier group of the 44th Capablanca Memorial in Havana.

In 2011, in Aix-les-Bains, he won the European Individual Chess Championship with a score of 8½/11, edging out on tiebreak Radoslaw Wojtaszek, Judit Polgar and Alexander Moiseenko. Later that year he competed in the Chess World Cup 2011, where he reached the fourth round and was eliminated by eventual runner-up Alexander Grischuk.

Potkin tied for first with Sergey Karjakin, Peter Svidler, Dmitry Andreikin, Dmitry Jakovenko and Evgeny Alekseev at the 2012 Russian Championship Superfinal in Moscow, after all players finished on 5/9 points. In the six-player rapid playoff he finished fifth.

In 2015, Potkin took part in the Tata Steel Challengers tournament in Wijk aan Zee, where he finished seventh with 7/13.
