= Murtas Kazhgaleyev =

Kazakhstani chess grandmaster (born 1973)

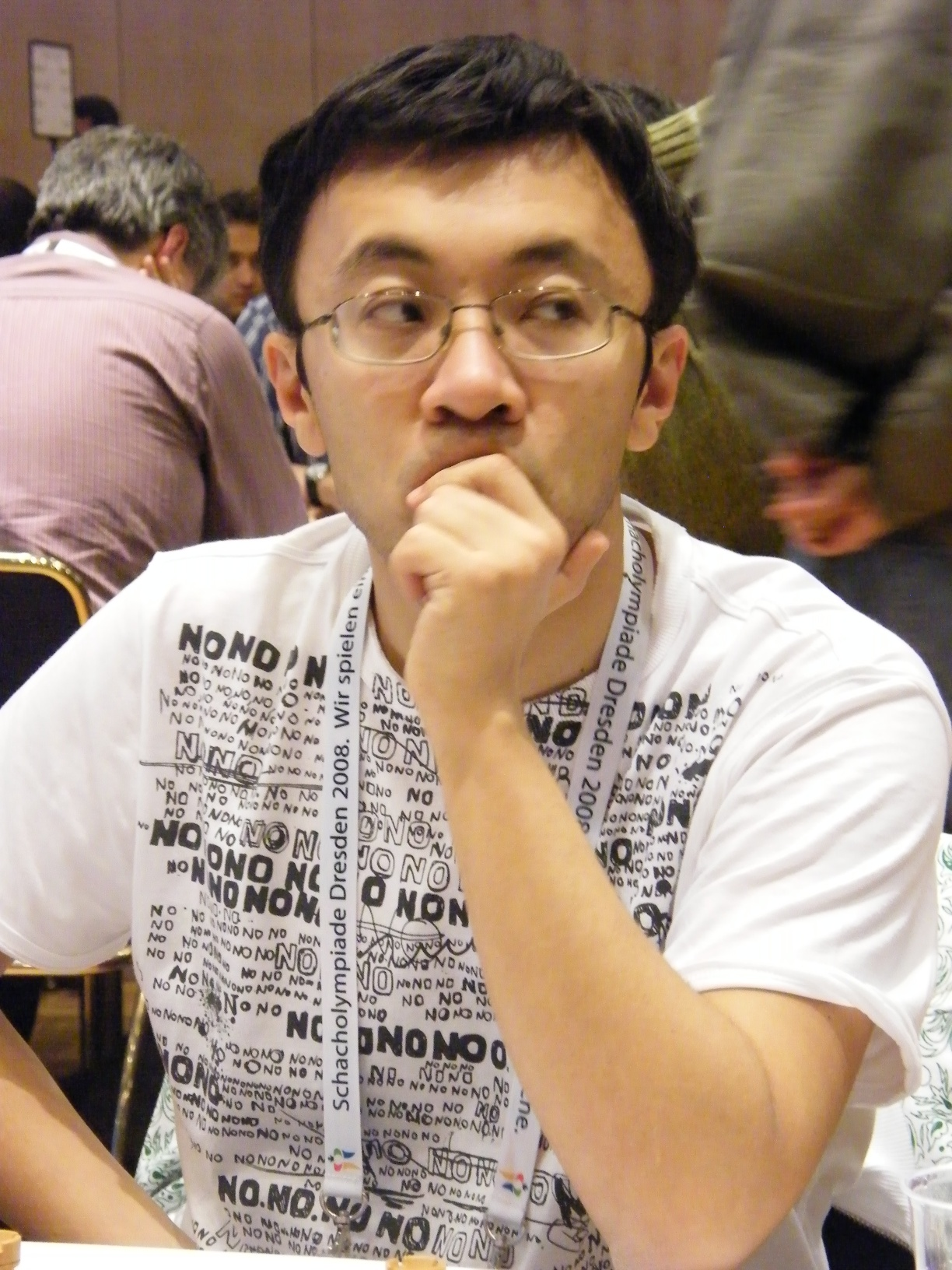
- Kazhgaleyev at the Dresden Olympiad, 2008

Personal information
- Born: 17 November 1973 (age 52) Uralsk, Kazakh SSR, Soviet Union

Chess career
- Country: Kazakhstan
- Title: Grandmaster (1998)
- FIDE rating: 2541 (July 2026)
- Peak rating: 2653 (November 2009)
- Peak ranking: No. 77 (November 2009)

Mūrtas Mūratūly Qajyğaliev (Note: Often transliterated as Murtas Muratovich Kazhgaleyev through a Russified Romanization of Муртас Муратович Кажгалеев.) (Kazakh: Мұртас Мұратұлы Қажығалиев; born 17 November 1973) is a Kazakhstani chess player who received the FIDE title of Grandmaster (GM) in 1998.

== Chess career ==
In 2004, he tied for first with Slim Belkhodja in the 27th Syre Memorial in Issy les Moulineaux. Kazhgaleyev competed in the Chess World Cup 2005: he knocked out Evgeny Alekseev in the first round to reach round two, losing to Teimour Radjabov and thus exiting the competition. He won the men's individual rapid tournament at the 15th Asian Games in Doha.

In 2007 he tied for 3rd–9th with Dmitry Svetushkin, Vladimir Malakhov, Evgeny Vorobiov, Pavel Smirnov, Vladimir Dobrov and Aleksej Aleksandrov in the 3rd Moscow Open tournament. At the 2007 Asian Indoor Games, which took place in Macau, Kazhgaleyev won two silver medals, in the men's individual classical tournament and in the men's individual rapid event.

In September 2009 he finished first in the Paris City Chess Championship for the second time, having won it also in 2006.

In January 2011 Kazhgaleyev took part in the Group C of the Tata Steel Chess Tournament in Wijk aan Zee, the Netherlands, where he finished seventh scoring 7/13 points. In April 2011 he tied for 2nd–5th with Parimarjan Negi, Csaba Balogh and Jon Ludvig Hammer in the 13th Dubai Open Chess Championship. Later that year Kazhgaleyev competed in the Chess World Cup 2011, where he was eliminated in round one by Dmitry Andreikin. He shared first place with Vasily Papin and Rustam Khusnutdinov in the 2014 Australasian Masters tournament.

In January 2015 he finished second to Ni Hua in the Australian Open. In May of the same year Kazhgaleyev won the Kazakhstani Chess Championship.

Kazhgaleyev played for Kazakhstan in the Chess Olympiads of 1996, 1998, 2000, 2008, 2010 and 2012.

== Notable games ==
- Bin-Sattar Reefat vs Murtas Kazhgaleyev, Asian Championships 2001, Spanish Game: Berlin Defense (C65), 0-1
- Joel Lautier vs Murtas Kazhgaleyev, Grand Prix d'Echecs 2004, King's Indian Defense: Saemisch Variation (E81), 0-1
- Teimour Radjabov vs Murtas Kazhgaleyev, FIDE World Cup 2005, Spanish Game: Exchange (C69), 0-1
- Murtas Kazhgaleyev vs Pawel Jaracz, Ordix Open 2008, Nimzo-Indian Defense: Classical Variation (E32), 1-0
