= Alexander Evdokimov =

Russian chess Grandmaster

Personal information
- Born: Александр Евдокимов; October 28, 1985 (age 40) Astrakhan, Russian SFSR, Soviet Union

Chess career
- Country: Russia
- Title: Grandmaster (2005)
- FIDE rating: 2465 (July 2026)
- Peak rating: 2569 (January 2008)

Alexander Evdokimov (Russian: Александр Евдокимов; born October 28, 1985) is a Russian chess Grandmaster (2005).

== Chess career ==
In 2007, he tied for 1st–9th with Alexei Fedorov, Vladimir Potkin, Aleksej Aleksandrov, Viacheslav Zakhartsov, Andrey Deviatkin, Denis Khismatullin, Evgeny Tomashevsky and Sergei Azarov in the Aratovsky Memorial in Saratov. In 2012 Evdokimov tied for 2nd–8th with Marc Tyler Arnold, Yury Shulman, Giorgi Kacheishvili, Ray Robson, Wesley So and Aleksander Lenderman in the 40th Annual World Open in Philadelphia.

== Notable games ==
- Alexander Evdokimov vs Evgeni Sveshnikov, 56th Russian Championships (2003), Semi-Slav Defense (D45), 1/2-1/2
