= Vladimir Dobrov =

Russian chess grandmaster (born 1984)

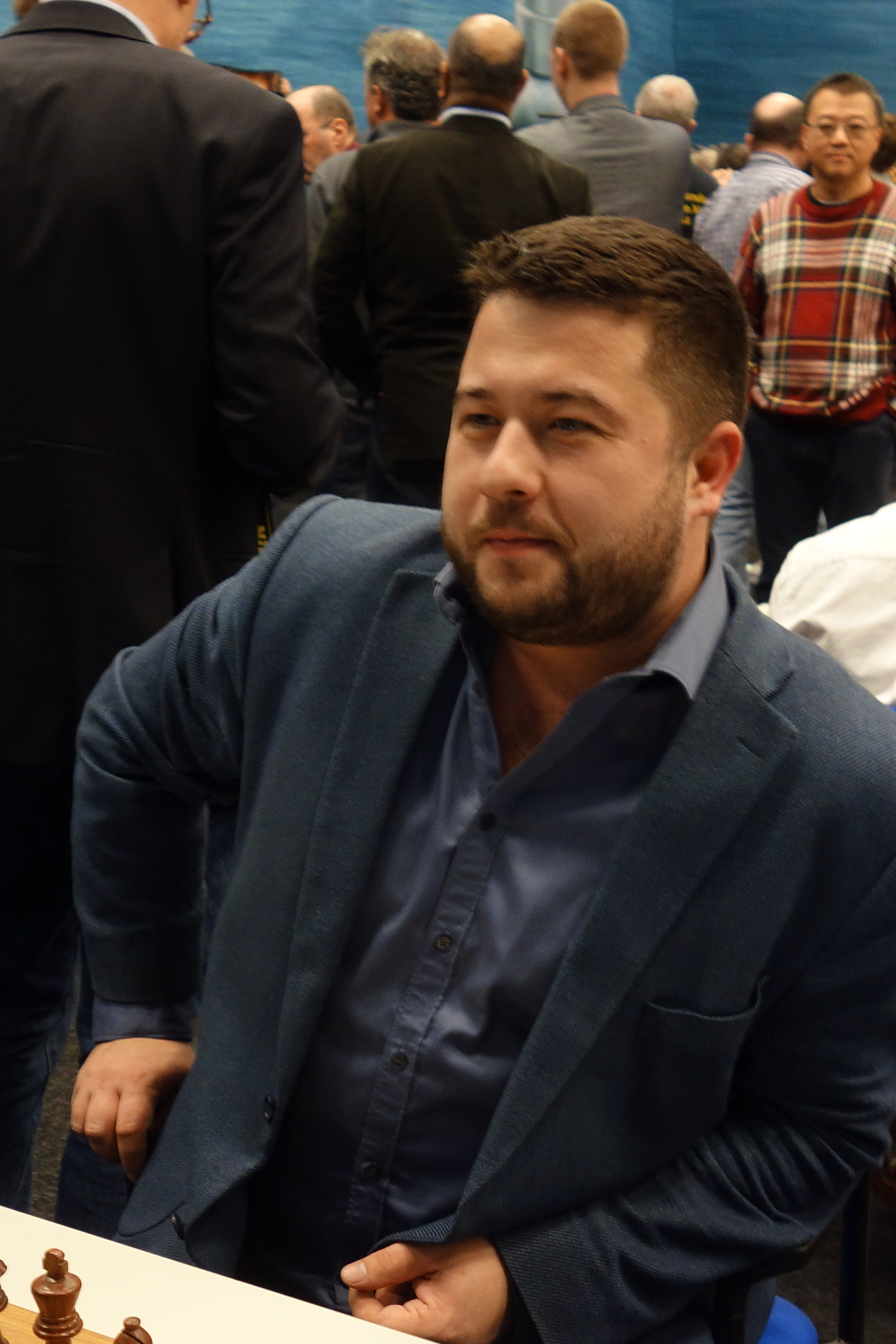
- Dobrov at the Tata Steel Chess Tournament 2017

Personal information
- Born: 13 April 1984 (age 42) Moscow, Soviet Union

Chess career
- Country: Russia
- Title: Grandmaster (2004)
- Peak rating: 2545 (June 2013)

Vladimir Vladimirovich Dobrov (Russian: Владимир Добров; born April 13, 1984) is a Russian chess grandmaster with a FIDE rating of 2478 as of May 2021. Dobrov obtained the title of International Master in 2001 and subsequently the title of grandmaster in 2004.

== Schooling ==
At the age of 15, Dobrov entered the Department of Chess of the Russian State University of Physical Education, Sport, Youth and Tourism (1999-2009). He studied in the Department of Chess at the same time as Alexander Grischuk, Vladimir Potkin, and Alexandra Kostenyuk under the leadership of Evgeny Pavlovich Linovitsky.

== Chess career ==
He was Russian Chess Champion U-20 and in 2007 tied for 3rd–9th with Dmitry Svetushkin, Vladimir Malakhov, Murtas Kazhgaleyev, Pavel Smirnov, Evgeny Vorobiov and Aleksej Aleksandrov in the 3rd Moscow Open tournament. He has won tournaments around the world, most of them in rapid chess, such as the Latin American Blitz Chess Tournament in Venezuela (2012), the blitz tournament at the Vladimir Petrov Memorial held in Latvia (2014), or the Ljubljana Chess Festival in Slovenia (2014). Dobrov was Blitz Champion of France (2015), after prevailing in a first place tie break with French Grandmasters Vladislav Tkachiev and Christian Bauer. He also won the Top 10 Tournament at Tata Steel Chess Tournament in Holland (2016). Dobrov is currently one of the coaches of the National Chess Team of Russia.

== Ratings ==
As of May 2021, Vladimir Dubrov has a standard FIDE rating of 2478, a rapid rating of 2450, and a blitz rating of 2614. His peak standard rating was 2545 in June 2013 and his peak rapid rating was 2607 from May to September in 2014.
