= Chess World Cup 2011 =

Chess tournament in Khanty-Mansiysk, Russia

FIDE Chess World Cup 2011
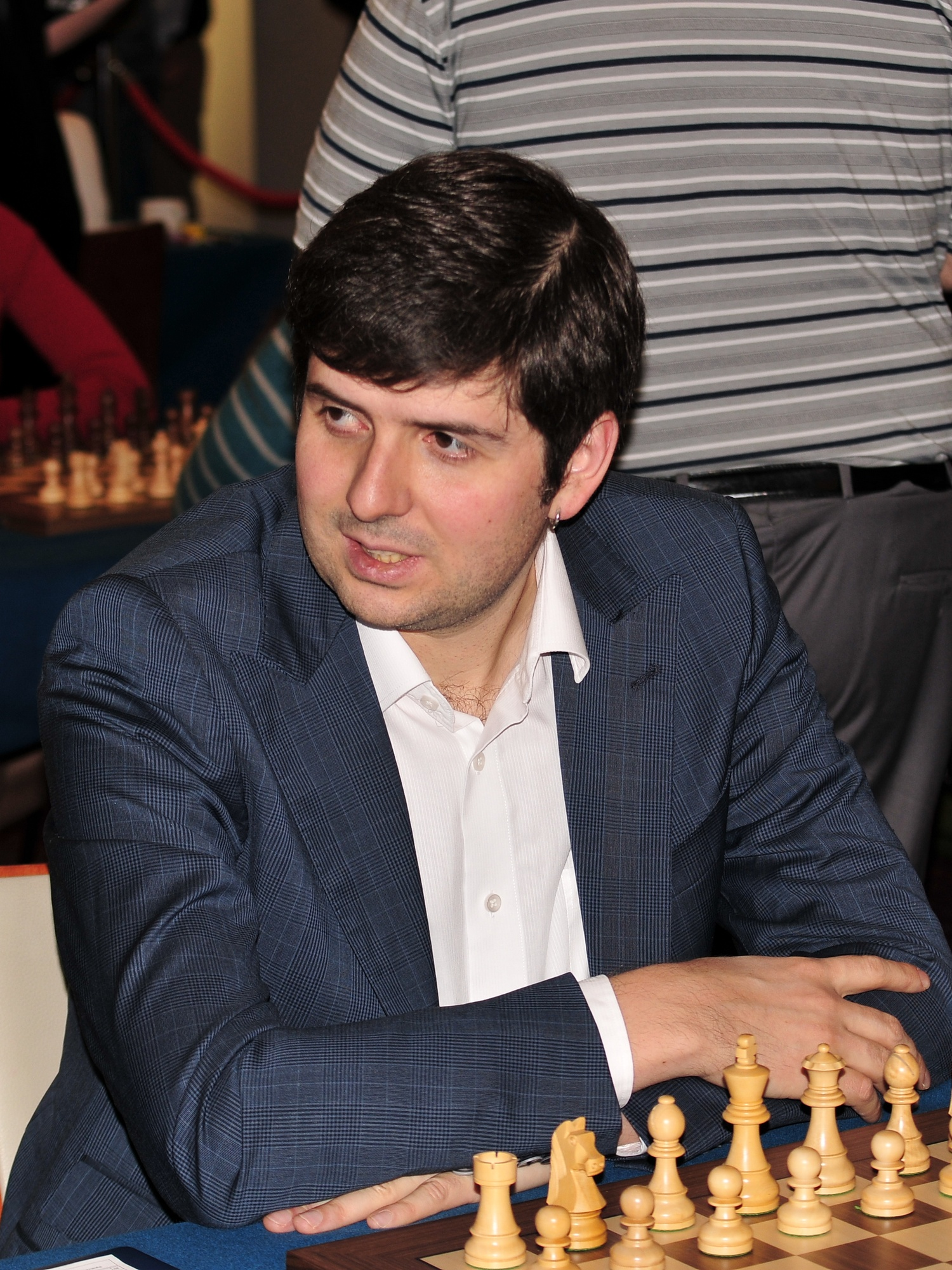
- 2011 FIDE World Cup winner Peter Svidler.

Tournament information
- Sport: Chess
- Location: Khanty-Mansiysk, Russia
- Dates: 26 August 2011–21 September 2011
- Administrator: FIDE
- Tournament format: Single-elimination tournament
- Host: Chess Federation of Russia

Final positions
- Champion: (Russia) Peter Svidler
- Runner-up: (Russia) Alexander Grischuk
- 3rd place: (Ukraine) Vasyl Ivanchuk

The Chess World Cup 2011 was a chess World Cup tournament. It was a 128-player single-elimination tournament, played between 26 August and 21 September 2011, in Khanty-Mansiysk, Russia. The Cup winner Peter Svidler, along with second placed Alexander Grischuk and third placed Vassily Ivanchuk, qualified for the Candidates stage of the World Chess Championship 2013.

== Format ==
Matches consisted of two games (except for the final, which consisted of four). Players had 90 minutes for the first 40 moves followed by 30 minutes for the rest of the game with an addition of 30 seconds per move from move one. If the match was tied after the regular games, tie breaks were played on the next day. The format for the tie breaks was as follows:

- Two rapid games (25 minutes plus 10 second increment) were played.
- If the score was still tied, two rapid games (10 minutes plus 10 second increment) were played.
- If these two games were drawn, the opponents played two blitz-games (5 minutes plus 3 second increment).
- If the score was still tied after pair of blitz games, a single armageddon game (white must win, black only needs to draw) would be played. White had 5 minutes, black had 4 minutes, and both players had three-second increments beginning with move 61. Eventually, two Armageddon game were played in round 1 and round 3.

In the final the regulation is the same with the exception that instead of two games with "long" time control the finalists are to play four. Those who lost in the semifinal round played an additional match (according to the same regulation as in the final) for third place and the right to participate in the Candidates. The first two "tickets" to the Candidates are given to the finalists.

== Participants ==
The winner of the Chess World Cup 2009, Boris Gelfand, did not participate. As the winner of the 2011 Candidates, he was an automatic qualifier for the 2013 Candidates.

The players qualified for the event were:

1. Sergey Karjakin (RUS), 2788 (WC)
2. Vassily Ivanchuk (UKR), 2768 (R)
3. Shakhriyar Mamedyarov (AZE), 2765 (R)
4. Ruslan Ponomariov (UKR), 2764 (WC)
5. Vugar Gashimov (AZE), 2760 (R)
6. Alexander Grischuk (RUS), 2746 (R)
7. Teimour Radjabov (AZE), 2744 (R)
8. Gata Kamsky (USA), 2741 (R)
9. Peter Svidler (RUS), 2739 (R)
10. Dmitry Jakovenko (RUS), 2736 (R)
11. Nikita Vitiugov (RUS), 2733 (R)
12. Zoltán Almási (HUN), 2726 (E10)
13. Francisco Vallejo Pons (ESP), 2724 (R)
14. David Navara (CZE), 2722 (R)
15. Maxime Vachier-Lagrave (FRA), 2722 (J09)
16. Leinier Domínguez (CUB), 2719 (R)
17. Wang Hao^{1} (CHN), 2718 (R)
18. Peter Leko (HUN), 2717 (R)
19. Alexander Moiseenko (UKR), 2715 (E11)
20. Lê Quang Liêm (VIE), 2715 (AS10)
21. Michael Adams (ENG), 2715 (R)
22. Alexei Shirov (ESP), 2714 (R)
23. Baadur Jobava (GEO), 2713 (E10)
24. Fabiano Caruana (ITA), 2711 (R)
25. Ian Nepomniachtchi (RUS), 2711 (E10)
26. Étienne Bacrot (FRA), 2710 (R)
27. Wang Yue (CHN), 2709 (R)
28. Evgeny Tomashevsky (RUS), 2707 (E10)
29. Zahar Efimenko (UKR), 2706 (E10)
30. Vladimir Malakhov (RUS), 2706 (WC)
31. Emil Sutovsky (ISR), 2700 (PN)
32. Sergei Movsesian (ARM), 2700 (E10)
33. Judit Polgár (HUN), 2699 (E11)
34. Laurent Fressinet (FRA), 2698 (R)
35. Pavel Eljanov (UKR), 2697 (R)
36. Ferenc Berkes (HUN), 2696 (E10)
37. Dmitry Andreikin (RUS), 2696 (J10)
38. Alexander Morozevich (RUS), 2694 (R)
39. Sergei Zhigalko (BLR), 2689 (E11)
40. Alexander Riazantsev (RUS), 2688 (E11)
41. Alexander Motylev (RUS), 2685 (E11)
42. Radosław Wojtaszek (POL), 2683 (E11)
43. Vladimir Potkin (RUS), 2682 (E10)
44. Peter Heine Nielsen (DEN), 2681 (PN)
45. Boris Grachev (RUS), 2680 (E10)
46. Ernesto Inarkiev (RUS), 2679 (E11)
47. Rauf Mamedov (AZE), 2679 (E10)
48. Mikhail Kobalia (RUS), 2679 (E11)
49. Viktor Bologan (MDA), 2678 (PN)
50. Bu Xiangzhi (CHN), 2675 (Z3.5)
51. Alexander Onischuk (USA), 2675 (Z2.1)
52. Lázaro Bruzón (CUB), 2673 (Z2.3)
53. Yu Yangyi (CHN), 2672 (AS11)
54. Anton Korobov (UKR), 2671 (E11)
55. Pendyala Harikrishna (IND), 2669 (AS11)
56. Li Chao (CHN), 2669 (Z3.5)
57. Rustam Kasimdzhanov (UZB), 2669 (PN)
58. Vladimir Akopian^{1} (ARM), 2667 (E10)
59. Sébastien Feller (FRA), 2666 (E11)
60. Artyom Timofeev (RUS), 2665 (E10)
61. Ni Hua (CHN), 2662 (AS10)
62. Daniel Fridman (GER), 2659 (E11)
63. Evgeny Alekseev (RUS), 2659 (E10)
64. Wesley So (PHI), 2658 (AS10)
65. Ding Liren (CHN), 2654 (PN)
66. Markus Ragger (AUT), 2651 (E11)
67. Constantin Lupulescu (ROU), 2650 (E11)
68. Ildar Khairullin (RUS), 2649 (E11)
69. Sergei Azarov (BLR), 2648 (E11)
70. Viorel Iordăchescu (MDA), 2646 (E11)
71. Parimarjan Negi (IND), 2642 (Z3.7)
72. Liviu-Dieter Nisipeanu (ROU), 2641 (E10)
73. Nguyễn Ngọc Trường Sơn (VIE), 2637 (AS11)
74. Maxim Rodshtein (ISR), 2637 (E10)
75. Zhou Jianchao (CHN), 2636 (AS10)
76. Mircea Pârligras (ROU), 2636 (E11)
77. Yuniesky Quesada (CUB), 2635 (AM11)
78. Ivan Ivanišević (SRB), 2633 (E11)
79. Ahmed Adly (EGY), 2631 (AF)
80. Bartosz Soćko (POL), 2631 (E10)
81. Igor Lysyj (RUS), 2629 (E10)
82. Abhijeet Gupta (IND), 2627 (AS10)
83. Ivan Salgado Lopez (ESP), 2626 (E10)
84. Evgeny Romanov (RUS), 2624 (E11)
85. Evgeny Postny (ISR), 2618 (E11)
86. Yury Shulman (USA), 2617 (Z2.1)
87. Arman Pashikian (ARM), 2616 (E10)
88. Yuri Drozdovskij (UKR), 2614 (E10)
89. Mark Bluvshtein (CAN), 2611 (AM11)
90. Anton Filippov (UZB), 2606 (Z3.4)
91. Stelios Halkias (GRE), 2600 (E10)
92. Murtas Kazhgaleyev (KAZ), 2597 (Z3.4)
93. Sandro Mareco (ARG), 2597 (Z2.5)
94. Yaroslav Zherebukh (UKR), 2590 (E11)
95. Rinat Jumabayev (KAZ), 2589 (AS11)
96. Fidel Corrales Jimenez (CUB), 2585 (AM11)
97. Hou Yifan (CHN), 2575 (WWC)
98. Evgeny Vorobiov (RUS), 2574 (E10)
99. Rubén Felgaer (ARG), 2573 (Z2.5)
100. Vlastimil Babula (CZE), 2572 (E10)
101. Zhao Zong-Yuan (AUS), 2570 (Z3.6)
102. Alexandr Fier (BRA), 2566 (Z2.4)
103. Ray Robson (USA), 2560 (Z2.1)
104. Isan Reynaldo Ortiz Suárez (CUB), 2556, IM (AM11)
105. Aleksei Pridorozhni (RUS), 2550 (ON)
106. Namig Guliyev (AZE), 2549 (E11)
107. Manuel León Hoyos (MEX), 2548 (Z2.3)
108. Mark Paragua (PHI), 2545 (Z3.3)
109. Susanto Megaranto (INA), 2544 (Z3.3)
110. Barış Esen (TUR), 2543 (E11)
111. Samuel Shankland (USA), 2539 (Z2.1)
112. Alexander Ivanov (USA), 2538 (Z2.1)
113. Elshan Moradi (IRI), 2532 (PN)
114. Ziaur Rahman (BAN), 2528 (Z3.2)
115. Nikolai Kabanov (RUS), 2520 (ON)
116. Jorge Cori (PER), 2514 (AM11)
117. Essam El-Gindy (EGY), 2510 (AF)
118. Alexei Bezgodov (RUS), 2503 (ON)
119. Salem A. R. Saleh (UAE), 2493 (Z3.1)
120. Darcy Lima (BRA), 2493 (AM10)
121. Diego Di Berardino (BRA), 2480, IM (Z2.4)
122. Frank De La Paz Perdomo (CUB), 2477 (AM11)
123. Vladimir Genba (RUS), 2452, IM (ON)
124. Eric Hansen (CAN), 2449, IM (Z2.2)
125. Robert Gwaze (ZIM), 2434, IM (Z4.3)
126. Hatim Ibrahim (EGY), 2402, no title (Z4.2)
127. Henry Robert Steel (RSA), 2362, FM (AF)
128. Mejdi Kaabi (TUN), 2344, IM (Z4.1)

^{1} Wang Hao and Vladimir Akopian did not appear for their first round matches and lost on forfeit.

All players are grandmasters unless indicated otherwise.

Qualification paths:

- WC: Finalist and Semi-finalists of Chess World Cup 2009
- WWC: Women's World Champion
- J09 and J10: World Junior Champions 2009 and 2010
- R: Rating (average of July 2010 and January 2011 ratings is used)
- E10 and E11: European Individual Championships 2010 and 2011
- AM10: Pan American Continental Absolute Championship 2010
- AM11: American Continental Chess Championship 2011
- AS10 and AS11: Asian Chess Championship 2010 and 2011
- AF: African Chess Championship 2011
- Z2.1, Z2.2, Z2.3, Z2.4, Z2.5, Z3.1, Z3.2, Z3.3, Z3.4, Z3.5, Z3.6, Z3.7, Z4.1, Z4.2, Z4.3: Zonal tournaments
- PN: FIDE president nominee
- ON: Organizer nominee

== Calendar ==
Round	Regular games	Tiebreaks
Round 1	28–29 August	30 August
Round 2	31 August–1 September	2 September
Round 3	3–4 September	5 September
Round 4	6–7 September	8 September
Quarterfinals	9–10 September	11 September
Semifinals	12–13 September	14 September
Final	16–19 September	20 September

== Results, rounds 1–4 ==
=== Section 1 ===
First round
1	(Russia) Sergey Karjakin	2
128	(Tunisia) Mejdi Kaabi	0
64	(Philippines) Wesley So	2½
65	(China) Ding Liren	1½
32	(Armenia) Sergei Movsesian	2
97	(China) Hou Yifan	0
33	(Hungary) Judit Polgár	2
96	(Cuba) Fidel Corrales Jimenez	0
16	(Cuba) Leinier Domínguez	1½
113	(Iran) Elshan Moradi	½
49	(Moldova) Viktor Bologan	1½
80	(Poland) Bartosz Soćko	½
17	(China) Wang Hao
112	(United States) Alexander Ivanov	w/o
48	(Russia) Mikhail Kobalia	1
81	(Russia) Igor Lysyj	3

Quarter-finals
1	(Russia) Sergey Karjakin	2½
64	(Philippines) Wesley So	1½
32	(Armenia) Sergei Movsesian	½
33	(Hungary) Judit Polgár	1½
16	(Cuba) Leinier Domínguez	1½
49	(Moldova) Viktor Bologan	½
112	(United States) Alexander Ivanov	1½
81	(Russia) Igor Lysyj	2½

Third round
1	(Russia) Sergey Karjakin	½
33	(Hungary) Judit Polgár	1½
16	(Cuba) Leinier Domínguez	5
81	(Russia) Igor Lysyj	4

Fourth round
33	(Hungary) Judit Polgár	4½
16	(Cuba) Leinier Domínguez	3½

=== Section 2 ===
First round
8	(United States) Gata Kamsky	2½
121	(Brazil) Diego Di Berardino	1½
57	(Uzbekistan) Rustam Kasimdzhanov	1½
72	(Romania) Liviu-Dieter Nisipeanu	½
25	(Russia) Ian Nepomniachtchi	2
104	(Cuba) Isan Reynaldo Ortiz Suárez	0
40	(Russia) Alexander Riazantsev	1½
89	(Canada) Mark Bluvshtein	½
9	(Russia) Peter Svidler	1½
120	(Brazil) Darcy Lima	½
56	(China) Li Chao	½
73	(Vietnam) Nguyễn Ngọc Trường Sơn	1½
24	(Italy) Fabiano Caruana	1½
105	(Russia) Aleksei Pridorozhni	½
41	(Russia) Alexander Motylev	4
88	(Ukraine) Yuri Drozdovskij	5

Quarter-finals
8	(United States) Gata Kamsky	1½
57	(Uzbekistan) Rustam Kasimdzhanov	½
25	(Russia) Ian Nepomniachtchi	2½
40	(Russia) Alexander Riazantsev	1½
9	(Russia) Peter Svidler	4
73	(Vietnam) Nguyễn Ngọc Trường Sơn	2
24	(Italy) Fabiano Caruana	1½
88	(Ukraine) Yuri Drozdovskij	½

Third round
8	(United States) Gata Kamsky	3
25	(Russia) Ian Nepomniachtchi	1
9	(Russia) Peter Svidler	3
24	(Italy) Fabiano Caruana	1

Fourth round
8	(United States) Gata Kamsky	0
9	(Russia) Peter Svidler	2

=== Section 3 ===
First round
4	(Ukraine) Ruslan Ponomariov	1½
125	(Zimbabwe) Robert Gwaze	½
61	(China) Ni Hua	3½
68	(Russia) Ildar Khairullin	2½
29	(Ukraine) Zahar Efimenko	1½
100	(Czech Republic) Vlastimil Babula	½
36	(Hungary) Ferenc Berkes	1½
93	(Argentina) Sandro Mareco	½
13	(Spain) Francisco Vallejo Pons	2½
116	(Peru) Jorge Cori	1½
52	(Cuba) Lázaro Bruzón	3½
77	(Cuba) Yuniesky Quesada	2½
20	(Vietnam) Lê Quang Liêm	1½
109	(Indonesia) Susanto Megaranto	½
45	(Russia) Boris Grachev	1½
84	(Russia) Evgeny Romanov	½

Quarter-finals
4	(Ukraine) Ruslan Ponomariov	3½
61	(China) Ni Hua	2½
29	(Ukraine) Zahar Efimenko	1½
36	(Hungary) Ferenc Berkes	½
13	(Spain) Francisco Vallejo Pons	1½
52	(Cuba) Lázaro Bruzón	2½
20	(Vietnam) Lê Quang Liêm	1½
45	(Russia) Boris Grachev	½

Third round
4	(Ukraine) Ruslan Ponomariov	2½
29	(Ukraine) Zahar Efimenko	1½
52	(Cuba) Lázaro Bruzón	2½
20	(Vietnam) Lê Quang Liêm	1½

Fourth round
4	(Ukraine) Ruslan Ponomariov	4½
52	(Cuba) Lázaro Bruzón	3½

=== Section 4 ===
First round
5	(Azerbaijan) Vugar Gashimov	2
124	(Canada) Eric Hansen	0
60	(Russia) Artyom Timofeev	½
69	(Belarus) Sergei Azarov	1½
28	(Russia) Evgeny Tomashevsky	2
101	(Australia) Zhao Zong-Yuan	0
37	(Russia) Dmitry Andreikin	1½
92	(Kazakhstan) Murtas Kazhgaleyev	½
12	(Hungary) Zoltán Almási	2
117	(Egypt) Essam El-Gindy	0
53	(China) Yu Yangyi	0
76	(Romania) Mircea Pârligras	2
21	(England) Michael Adams	1½
108	(Philippines) Mark Paragua	½
44	(Denmark) Peter Heine Nielsen	5
85	(Israel) Evgeny Postny	3

Quarter-finals
5	(Azerbaijan) Vugar Gashimov	1½
69	(Belarus) Sergei Azarov	½
28	(Russia) Evgeny Tomashevsky	1½
37	(Russia) Dmitry Andreikin	½
12	(Hungary) Zoltán Almási	½
76	(Romania) Mircea Pârligras	1½
21	(England) Michael Adams	1½
44	(Denmark) Peter Heine Nielsen	2½

Third round
5	(Azerbaijan) Vugar Gashimov	1½
28	(Russia) Evgeny Tomashevsky	½
76	(Romania) Mircea Pârligras	1
44	(Denmark) Peter Heine Nielsen	3

Fourth round
5	(Azerbaijan) Vugar Gashimov	4
44	(Denmark) Peter Heine Nielsen	2

=== Section 5 ===
First round
2	(Ukraine) Vassily Ivanchuk	2
127	(South Africa) Henry Robert Steel	0
63	(Russia) Evgeny Alekseev	2½
66	(Austria) Markus Ragger	1½
31	(Israel) Emil Sutovsky	2½
98	(Russia) Evgeny Vorobiov	1½
34	(France) Laurent Fressinet	2
95	(Kazakhstan) Rinat Jumabayev	0
15	(France) Maxime Vachier-Lagrave	1½
114	(Bangladesh) Ziaur Rahman	½
50	(China) Bu Xiangzhi	2
79	(Egypt) Ahmed Adly	0
18	(Hungary) Peter Leko	½
111	(United States) Samuel Shankland	1½
47	(Azerbaijan) Rauf Mamedov	½
82	(India) Abhijeet Gupta	1½

Quarter-finals
2	(Ukraine) Vassily Ivanchuk	1½
63	(Russia) Evgeny Alekseev	½
31	(Israel) Emil Sutovsky	1½
34	(France) Laurent Fressinet	½
15	(France) Maxime Vachier-Lagrave	1½
50	(China) Bu Xiangzhi	2½
111	(United States) Samuel Shankland	½
82	(India) Abhijeet Gupta	1½

Third round
2	(Ukraine) Vassily Ivanchuk	3
31	(Israel) Emil Sutovsky	1
50	(China) Bu Xiangzhi	1½
82	(India) Abhijeet Gupta	½

Fourth round
2	(Ukraine) Vassily Ivanchuk	3
50	(China) Bu Xiangzhi	1

=== Section 6 ===
First round
7	(Azerbaijan) Teimour Radjabov	2
122	(Cuba) Frank De La Paz Perdomo	0
58	(Armenia) Vladimir Akopian
71	(India) Parimarjan Negi	w/o
26	(France) Étienne Bacrot	4
103	(United States) Ray Robson	2
39	(Belarus) Sergei Zhigalko	0
90	(Uzbekistan) Anton Filippov	2
10	(Russia) Dmitry Jakovenko	2
119	(United Arab Emirates) Salem A. R. Saleh	0
55	(India) Pendyala Harikrishna	1½
74	(Israel) Maxim Rodshtein	½
23	(Georgia (country)) Baadur Jobava	2
106	(Azerbaijan) Namig Guliyev	0
42	(Poland) Radosław Wojtaszek	2
87	(Armenia) Arman Pashikian	0

Quarter-finals
7	(Azerbaijan) Teimour Radjabov	1½
71	(India) Parimarjan Negi	½
26	(France) Étienne Bacrot	3
90	(Uzbekistan) Anton Filippov	1
10	(Russia) Dmitry Jakovenko	1½
55	(India) Pendyala Harikrishna	½
23	(Georgia (country)) Baadur Jobava	1½
42	(Poland) Radosław Wojtaszek	½

Third round
7	(Azerbaijan) Teimour Radjabov	1½
26	(France) Étienne Bacrot	½
10	(Russia) Dmitry Jakovenko	2
23	(Georgia (country)) Baadur Jobava	0

Fourth round
7	(Azerbaijan) Teimour Radjabov	1½
10	(Russia) Dmitry Jakovenko	½

=== Section 7 ===
First round
3	(Azerbaijan) Shakhriyar Mamedyarov	2
126	(Egypt) Hatim Ibrahim	0
62	(Germany) Daniel Fridman	1½
67	(Romania) Constantin Lupulescu	½
30	(Russia) Vladimir Malakhov	1½
99	(Argentina) Rubén Felgaer	2½
35	(Ukraine) Pavel Eljanov	1½
94	(Ukraine) Yaroslav Zherebukh	2½
14	(Czech Republic) David Navara	2
115	(Russia) Nikolai Kabanov	0
51	(United States) Alexander Onischuk	1½
78	(Serbia) Ivan Ivanišević	½
19	(Ukraine) Alexander Moiseenko	1½
110	(Turkey) Baris Esen	½
46	(Russia) Ernesto Inarkiev	1½
83	(Spain) Ivan Salgado Lopez	½

Quarter-finals
3	(Azerbaijan) Shakhriyar Mamedyarov	2½
62	(Germany) Daniel Fridman	1½
99	(Argentina) Rubén Felgaer	1
94	(Ukraine) Yaroslav Zherebukh	3
14	(Czech Republic) David Navara	1½
51	(United States) Alexander Onischuk	½
19	(Ukraine) Alexander Moiseenko	3
46	(Russia) Ernesto Inarkiev	1

Third round
3	(Azerbaijan) Shakhriyar Mamedyarov	1½
94	(Ukraine) Yaroslav Zherebukh	2½
14	(Czech Republic) David Navara	4
19	(Ukraine) Alexander Moiseenko	2

Fourth round
94	(Ukraine) Yaroslav Zherebukh	0
14	(Czech Republic) David Navara	2

=== Section 8 ===
First round
6	(Russia) Alexander Grischuk	1½
123	(Russia) Vladimir Genba	½
59	(France) Sébastien Feller	2½
70	(Moldova) Viorel Iordăchescu	1½
27	(China) Wang Yue	½
102	(Brazil) Alexandr Fier	1½
38	(Russia) Alexander Morozevich	3
91	(Greece) Stelios Halkias	1
11	(Russia) Nikita Vitiugov	4
118	(Russia) Alexei Bezgodov	2
54	(Ukraine) Anton Korobov	2
75	(China) Zhou Jianchao	0
22	(Spain) Alexei Shirov	1½
107	(Mexico) Manuel León Hoyos	½
43	(Russia) Vladimir Potkin	3½
86	(United States) Yury Shulman	2½

Quarter-finals
6	(Russia) Alexander Grischuk	2½
59	(France) Sébastien Feller	1½
102	(Brazil) Alexandr Fier	0
38	(Russia) Alexander Morozevich	2
11	(Russia) Nikita Vitiugov	1½
54	(Ukraine) Anton Korobov	½
22	(Spain) Alexei Shirov	0
43	(Russia) Vladimir Potkin	2

Third round
6	(Russia) Alexander Grischuk	1½
38	(Russia) Alexander Morozevich	½
11	(Russia) Nikita Vitiugov	1½
43	(Russia) Vladimir Potkin	2½

Fourth round
6	(Russia) Alexander Grischuk	2½
43	(Russia) Vladimir Potkin	1½

== Results, rounds 5–7 ==
Quarterfinals
33	(Hungary) Judit Polgár	½
9	(Russia) Peter Svidler	1½
4	(Ukraine) Ruslan Ponomariov	1½
5	(Azerbaijan) Vugar Gashimov	½
2	(Ukraine) Vassily Ivanchuk	2½
7	(Azerbaijan) Teimour Radjabov	1½
14	(Czech Republic) David Navara	1½
6	(Russia) Alexander Grischuk	2½

Semifinals
9	(Russia) Peter Svidler	1½
4	(Ukraine) Ruslan Ponomariov	½
2	(Ukraine) Vassily Ivanchuk	2½
6	(Russia) Alexander Grischuk	3½

Final (best of 4)
9	(Russia) Peter Svidler	2½
6	(Russia) Alexander Grischuk	1½
Third place
4	(Ukraine) Ruslan Ponomariov	1½
2	(Ukraine) Vassily Ivanchuk	2½

=== Third place, 16–20 September ===
Seed	Name	Rating	1	2	3	4	Total
4	Ruslan Ponomariov (UKR)	2758	½	0	½	½	1½
2	Vassily Ivanchuk (UKR)	2765	½	1	½	½	2½

=== Final, 16–20 September ===
Seed	Name	Rating	1	2	3	4	Total
9	Peter Svidler (RUS)	2740	1	½	½	½	2½
6	Alexander Grischuk (RUS)	2757	0	½	½	½	1½
