= Sergei Yudin (chess player) =

Russian chess grandmaster (born 1986)

Personal information
- Born: June 10, 1986 (age 40) Novosibirsk, Soviet Union

Chess career
- Country: Russia
- Title: Grandmaster (2009)
- FIDE rating: 2458 (July 2026)
- Peak rating: 2599 (July 2009)

Sergei Andreevich Yudin is a Russian chess grandmaster.

== Chess career ==
In December 2010, he tied for 1st–4th with Semen Dvoirys, Pavel Smirnov and Sergei Iskusnyh at the Pavlodar Open.

In June 2014, he defeated several stronger grandmasters at the World Blitz Championship: Teimour Radjabov, Peter Svidler, and Hikaru Nakamura, ultimately finishing in 12th place despite being seeded only in 86th.

In March 2018, he won the Cup of Governor of Irkutsk Oblast with a score of 9/11, half a point ahead of runners-up Pavel Ponkratov and Igor Lysyj.

In January 2020, he finished as the second runner-up in the Chennai GM Open, behind winner Pavel Ponkratov and first runner-up José Martínez Alcántara.
