= Evgeny Vorobiov =

Russian chess grandmaster (born 1971)

Personal information
- Born: Evgeny Evgenievich Vorobiov; 13 December 1976 (age 49) Moscow, Russian SFSR, Soviet Union

Chess career
- Country: Russia
- Title: Grandmaster (2000)
- Peak rating: 2621 (January 2010)

Evgeny Evgenievich Vorobiov (Russian: Евгений Евгеньевич Воробьёв) is a Russian chess grandmaster.

== Career ==
In 2007 he tied for 3rd–9th with Dmitry Svetushkin, Vladimir Malakhov, Murtas Kazhgaleyev, Pavel Smirnov, Vladimir Dobrov and Aleksej Aleksandrov in the 3rd Moscow Open tournament.

Evgeny Vorobiov qualified for the Chess World Cup 2011, where he was defeated by Emil Sutovsky in the first round.

In 2012, Vorobiov won the Vila de Sitges.
