= Khismatullin =

Khismatullin (Russian: Хисматуллин) is a Tatar masculine surname, its feminine counterpart is Khismatullina. Notable people with the surname include:

- Denis Khismatullin (born 1984), Russian chess grandmaster
