= Pavel Smirnov =

Russian chess grandmaster (born 1982)

Personal information
- Born: 14 April 1982 (age 44) Mezhdurechensk, Kemerovo Oblast, Russian SFSR, Soviet Union

Chess career
- Country: Russia
- Title: Grandmaster (2003)
- FIDE rating: 2460 (September 2026)
- Peak rating: 2645 (January 2005)
- Peak ranking: No. 51 (January 2005)

Pavel Smirnov (Russian: Павел Смирнов; born 27 April 1982 in Mezhdurechensk) is a Russian chess Grandmaster.

== Chess career ==
In 2001 he was a member of the Russian junior team in the first China vs Russia match that took place in Shanghai. Smirnov finished runner-up in the 2002 Russian Chess Championship.

In 2004 Smirnov reached the fourth round of the FIDE World Chess Championship, where he lost to Teimour Radjabov and therefore was eliminated from the competition. He knocked out in the previous rounds Lázaro Bruzón, Abobker Elarbi, and Levon Aronian. In the same year he came first in the 8th World University Chess Championship in Istanbul and in the Tigran Petrosian Memorial in Yerevan; Smirnov won the latter scoring 7.5 points out of 9, half point ahead of Vassily Ivanchuk.

He competed in the Chess World Cup 2005, where he was eliminated in the first round by Dmitry Bocharov.

In 2007 he played for Tomsk-400 team that won the Russian Team Chess Championship and tied for 3rd–9th with Dmitry Svetushkin, Vladimir Malakhov, Evgeny Vorobiov, Murtas Kazhgaleyev, Vladimir Dobrov and Aleksej Aleksandrov in the 3rd Moscow Open tournament. In 2010 he tied for 1st–4th with Sergei Yudin, Semen Dvoirys and Sergei Iskusnyh in Pavlodar. In 2013 Smirnov won the 5th Baku Open.

== Notable games ==
- Pavel Smirnov vs Andrei Belozerov, RUS-Cup03 2002, Spanish Game: Morphy Defense (C72), 1-0
- Pavel Smirnov vs Levon Aronian, FIDE World Championship 2004, Spanish Game: Berlin Defense, (C67), 1-0
