= Dmitry Svetushkin =

Moldovan chess grandmaster (1980–2020)

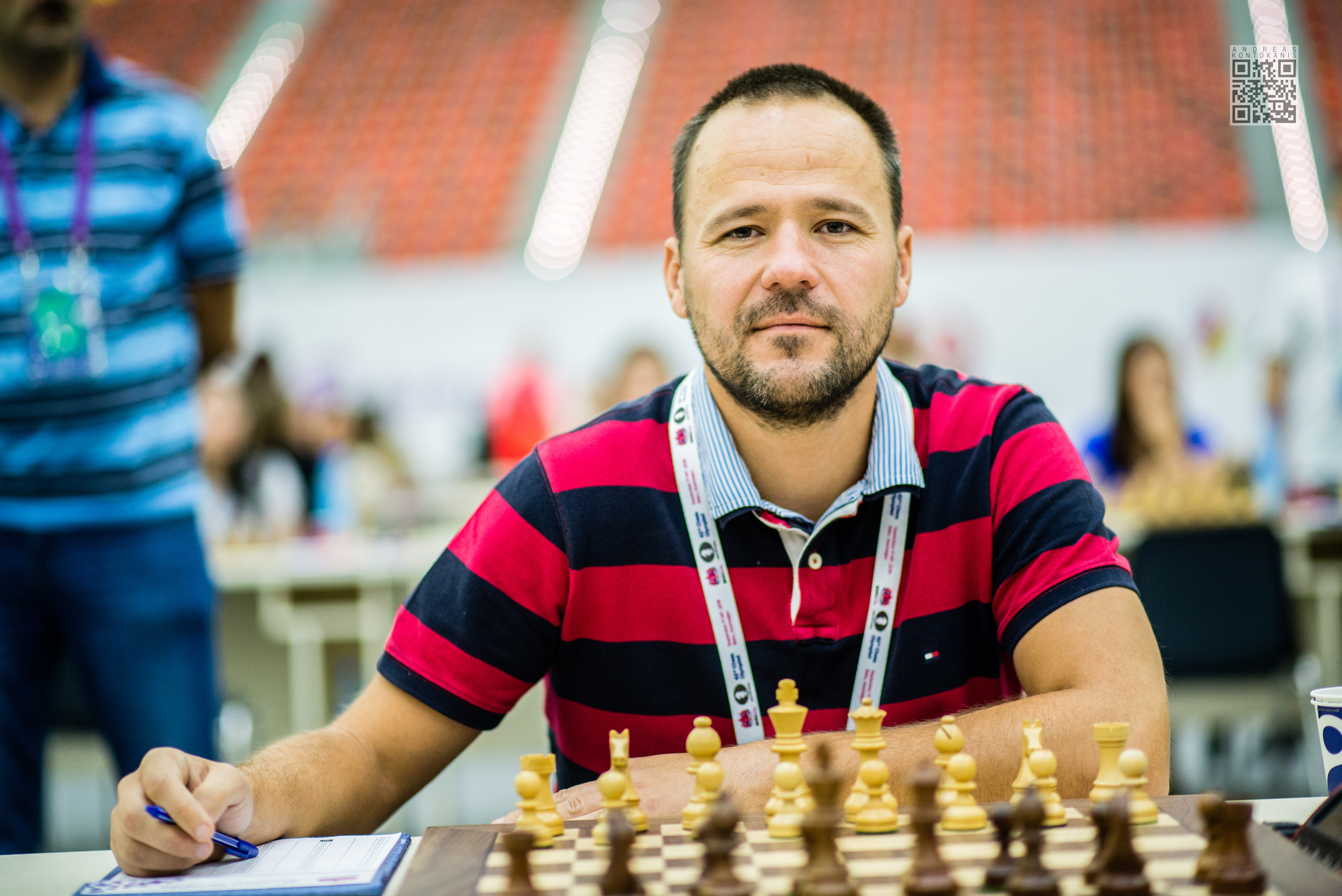
- Svetushkin at 2016 Chess Olympiad, Baku

Personal information
- Born: 25 July 1980 Moldavian SSR
- Died: 4 September 2020 (aged 40) Chișinău, Moldova

Chess career
- Country: Moldova
- Title: Grandmaster (2002)
- Peak rating: 2621 (November 2011)

Dmitry Svetushkin (Russian: Дмитрий Светушкин; Romanian: Dumitru Svetuşchin; 25 July 1980 – 4 September 2020) was a Moldovan chess player. He was awarded the title Grandmaster by FIDE in 2002.

He won the Moldovan Chess Championship in 2000. He tied for first with Johan Hellsten and Marcin Szymański in the Ikaros Chess Festival 2003. In 2007 he tied for 2nd–7th with Kiril Georgiev, Vadim Malakhatko, Mircea Parligras, Hristos Banikas, and Dimitrios Mastrovasilis in the Acropolis International Tournament and tied for 3rd–9th with Pavel Smirnov, Vladimir Malakhov, Evgeny Vorobiov, Murtas Kazhgaleyev, Vladimir Dobrov, and Aleksej Aleksandrov in the 3rd Moscow Open tournament. In 2008 he won the 2nd Gap Open. In 2010 he tied for 1st–3rd with Yuriy Kryvoruchko and Alexander Zubarev at Palaiochora. In 2012 Svetushkin won the 2nd International Tournament Isthmia in Vrachati on tiebreak from Eric Hansen and Shyam Sundar, and the 17th Bora Kostic Memorial, a category 14 round-robin tournament in Vršac. In 2017, he finished second in the 19th Sants Open in Barcelona and won the 3rd Ceramica Corund Open on tiebreak from Benjamin Gledura.

Svetushkin played for the Moldovan national team in the Chess Olympiad and the European Team Chess Championship. In the 2014 Olympiad he achieved a rating performance of 2809, the fourth best on board two.

Dmitry Svetushkin died on 4 September 2020.

== Books ==
- Svetushkin, Dmitry (2013). The Ultimate Anti-Grünfeld: A Sämisch Repertoire. Chess Stars. ISBN 978-9548782944.
