= Denis Khismatullin =

Russian chess grandmaster (born 1984)

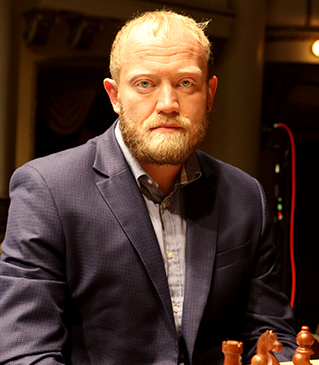
- Denis Khismatullin, Satka 2018

Personal information
- Born: Denis Rimovich Khismatullin; 28 December 1984 (age 41) Neftekamsk, Russian SFSR, Soviet Union

Chess career
- Country: Russia
- Title: Grandmaster (2004)
- FIDE rating: 2522 (July 2026)
- Peak rating: 2714 (March 2014)
- Peak ranking: No. 34 (March 2014)

Denis Rimovich Khismatullin (Russian: Денис Римович Хисматуллин, born 28 December 1984) is a Russian chess grandmaster. He is the first grandmaster from Bashkiria. Khismatullin competed in the FIDE World Cup in 2013 and 2015.

== Chess career ==
Born in Neftekamsk, Khismatullin lives in Ufa, and studied at the Ufa Oil University.

Khismatullin won the silver medal at the Under 16 event of the World Youth Chess Championships in 2000. In 2011 he tied for 4th–10th with Rustam Kasimdzhanov, Gata Kamsky, Rauf Mamedov, Ivan Cheparinov, Maxim Rodshtein and Yu Yangyi in the Aeroflot Open in Moscow. He took part in the Chess World Cup 2011, where he was eliminated in the first round by Mikhail Kobalia. In 2013 Khismatullin tied for 1st–11th with Pavel Eljanov, Dmitry Kokarev, Alexander Areshchenko, Maxim Matlakov, Oleg Korneev, Dragan Solak, Vadim Zvjaginsev, Sanan Sjugirov, Ivan Bukavshin and Ildar Khairullin in the Chigorin Memorial in Saint Petersburg. He has also served as Dmitry Jakovenko's second.

In December 2013, he won the 8th Ugra Governor's Cup in Khanty-Mansiysk. In January 2014, Khismatullin won a friendly eight-game match with Salem A. R. Saleh by 7–1. Soon after, in the same month, he won the Vladimir Dvorkovich Memorial in Taganrog. These latter three achievements enabled him to cross the 2700 Elo rating mark in the March 2014 FIDE rating list. He finished third in the Superfinal of the 2014 Russian Chess Championship behind Igor Lysyj and Dmitry Jakovenko respectively.

Khismatullin tied for 2nd–4th place with David Navara and Mateusz Bartel, finishing fourth on tiebreak, in the 2015 European Individual Chess Championship, held in Jerusalem. This result qualified him for the Chess World Cup 2015, where he was eliminated in the first round by Alexander Areshchenko. That same year Khismatullin won the Rashid Nezhmetdinov Memorial tournament in Kazan.

In December 2015 he won the Russian Rapid Grand Prix in Khanty-Mansiysk.

== Political views ==
Khismatullin has been a vocal supporter of the 2022 Russian invasion of Ukraine, travelling to the front lines, where he took part in photo ops with the Russian soldiers, together with fellow Russian chess grandmaster Sergey Karjakin, who has been sanctioned by FIDE for his pro-war stance. Khismatullin's own pro-war stance led to criticism of his stance by, among others, Polish grandmaster Jan-Krzysztof Duda, who refused to shake Khismatullin's hand during a 2023 match. El Pais called him "the most controversial participant" of the World Rapid Chess Championship in 2023.

== Notable game ==
Khismatullin vs. Eljanov, Jerusalem 2015

Position: b6 black pawn, g6 white queen, h6 black pawn, h4 black king, d3 black pawn, e3 white pawn, h3 white pawn, e2 black queen, g2 white pawn, h2 white king

Final position after 57. Qg6

Denis Khismatullin vs Pavel Eljanov, 2015 European Individual Chess Championship, round 10:

1. d4 Nf6 2. c4 e6 3. Nc3 Bb4 4. e3 O-O 5. Ne2 Re8 6. a3 Bf8 7. Ng3 d5 8. Be2 a6 9. O-O c5 10. dxc5 Bxc5 11. cxd5 exd5 12. Bf3 Be6 13. b4 Bd6 14. Bb2 Be5 15. Na4 Bxb2 16. Nxb2 Nc6 17. Nd3 Qb6 18. Rc1 a5 19. Rb1 axb4 20. axb4 Rad8 21. b5 Na5 22. Ne2 Ne4 23. Ndf4 Nc4 24. Bxe4 dxe4 25. Nd4 Bc8 26. Rc1 Ne5 27. Qb3 Qh6 28. Rc5 b6 29. Rd5 Bb7 30. Rxd8 Rxd8 31. Rd1 Qg5 32. Kf1 g6 33. h3 Nd3 34. Nc6 Bxc6 35. bxc6 Qc5 36. Qa4 Kg7 37. Qa1+ Kg8 38. Qa4 Rd6 39. Qa8+ Kg7 40. Qa1+ Kh6 41. Nxd3 exd3 42. Qh8 Qc2 43. Qf8+ Kg5 44. Kg1 Qxd1+ 45. Kh2 Rxc6 46. Qe7+ Kh6 47. Qf8+ Kg5 48. Qxf7 Rf6 49. f4+ Kh6 50. Qxf6 Qe2 51. Qf8+ Kh5 52. Qg7 h6 53. Qe5+ Kh4 54. Qf6+ Kh5 55. f5 gxf5 56. Qxf5+ Kh4 57. Qg6 1-0
