= Sergei Iskusnyh =

Russian chess grandmaster (born 1974)

Personal information
- Born: September 5, 1974 (age 51) Novokuznetsk, Soviet Union

Chess career
- Country: Russia
- Title: Grandmaster (2001)
- FIDE rating: 2440 (July 2026)
- Peak rating: 2520 (October 2006)

Sergei Vladimirovich Iskusnyh is a Russian chess grandmaster.

== Chess career ==
He was awarded the Grandmaster title in 2001.

In December 2010, he tied for 1st–4th with Semen Dvoirys, Pavel Smirnov and Sergei Yudin at the Pavlodar Open.

In July 2011, he finished in 26th place in the Lev Polugaevsky Memorial, scoring 5.5/9.

In October 2013, he finished in 16th place in the Kustov Memorial, scoring 7.5/11.

In June 2014, he finished in 15th place in the Russian Individual Chess Championship, scoring 5/9.
