= Kosintsev =

Kosintsev (Russian: Косинцев) is a Russian masculine surname, its feminine counterpart is Kosintseva. It may refer to

- Nadezhda Kosintseva (born 1985), Russian chess player
- Tatiana Kosintseva (born 1986), Russian chess player, sister of Nadezhda
