= Alexander Riazantsev (chess player) =

Russian chess grandmaster (born 1985)

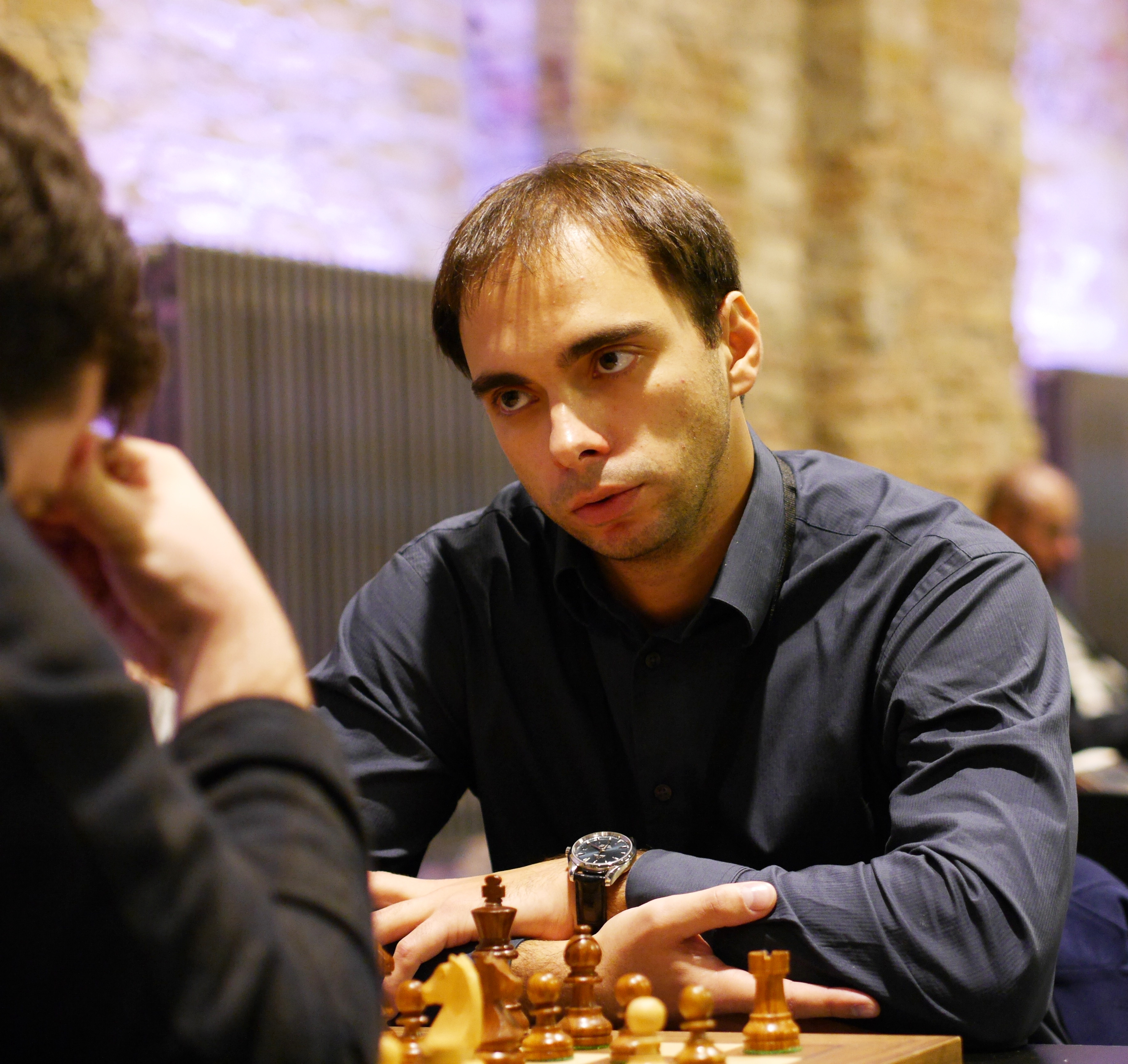
- Alexander Riazantsev, 2015

Personal information
- Born: 12 September 1985 (age 40) Moscow, Russian SFSR, Soviet Union (now Russia)

Chess career
- Country: Russia
- Title: Grandmaster (2001)
- FIDE rating: 2590 (July 2026)
- Peak rating: 2720 (July 2012)
- Peak ranking: No. 27 (July 2012)

Alexander Riazantsev (Russian: Александр Рязанцев; born 12 September 1985) is a Russian chess grandmaster. In 2016, he won the Russian Chess Championship and the European Rapid Chess Championship. He is one of the coaches of the Russian women's national chess team.

== Career ==
Riazantsev won the World Youth Chess Championship in the U12 section in 1997, and the European Youth Chess Championship in the U14 division in 1998. In 2005, he won the Stork Young Masters tournament in Hengelo on tiebreak from Andrey Zhigalko, Vladimir Belov and David Baramidze. The following year, he came first in the Moscow championship. In 2010, Riazantsev tied for 1st–7th places with Vitali Golod, Nadezhda Kosintseva, Leonid Kritz, Sébastien Feller, Christian Bauer, Sébastien Mazé in the Master Open at the 43rd Biel Chess Festival, winning the event on tie-break score.

He competed in the FIDE World Cup in 2011 and 2013.

In September 2011, Riazantsev was appointed Russian national team coach.
