= Anna Zozulia =

Ukrainian-Belgian chess player (born 1980)

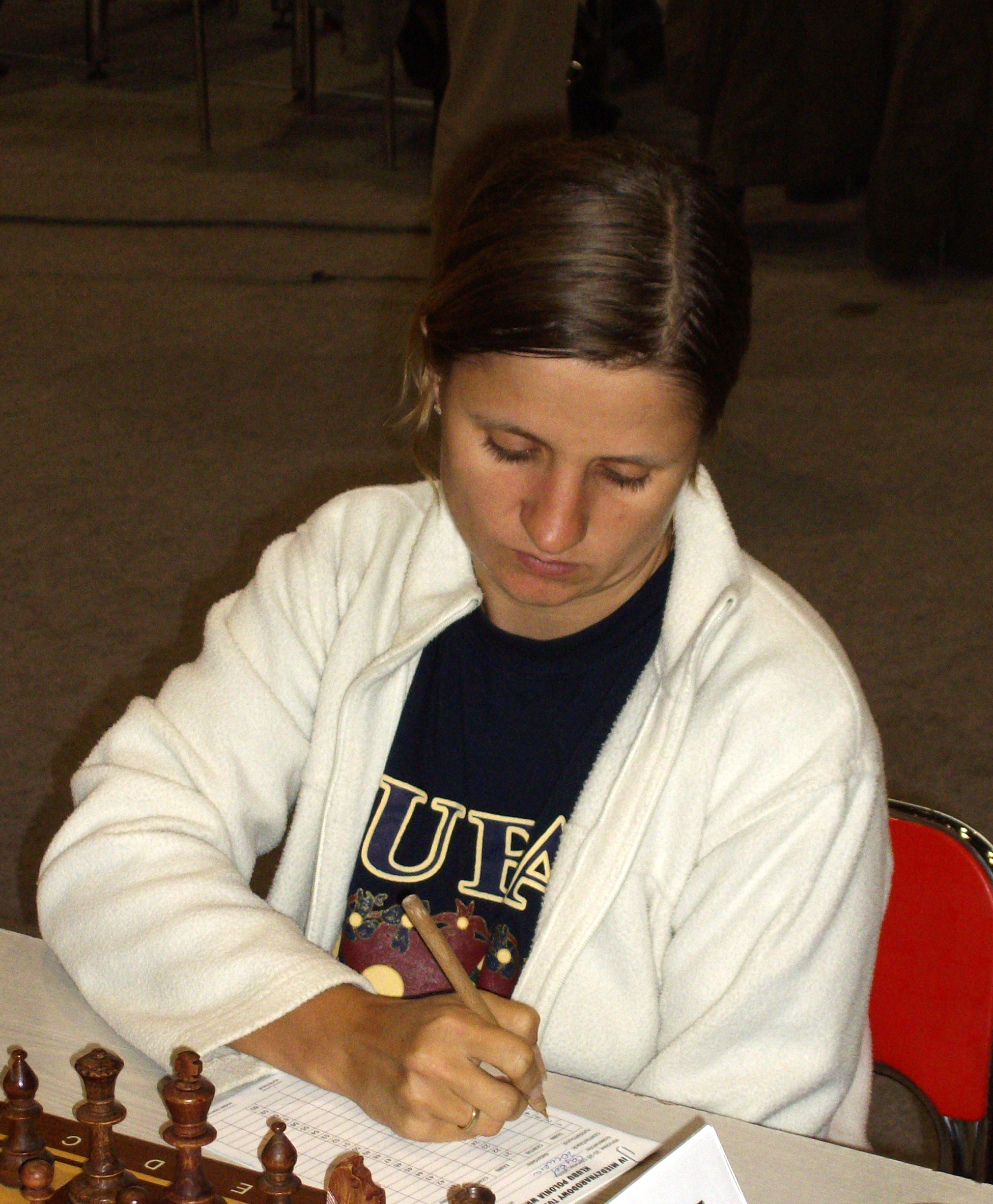
- Zozulia in 2009

Personal information
- Born: 10 March 1980 (age 46) Ukraine
- Spouse: Vadim Malakhatko (died)

Chess career
- Country: Ukraine (until 2007); Belgium (since 2007)
- Title: International Master (2004); Woman Grandmaster (2001)
- Peak rating: 2412 (October 2004)

Anna Zozulia (born March 10, 1980) is a Ukrainian-Belgian chess player.

== Career ==
She is an International Master, and a Woman Grandmaster.

Originally from Ukraine, she now lives in Belgium.

She won the girls' under-16 World Youth Chess Championship in 1996 for Ukraine, and the women's Belgian Chess Championship in 2011.

== Personal life ==
She was married to GM Vadim Malakhatko.
