= Mejdi Kaabi =

Tunisian chess player (1961–2019)

Personal information
- Born: 9 June 1961
- Died: 28 June 2019 (aged 58) Tunisia

Chess career
- Country: Tunisia
- Title: International Master (1982)
- Peak rating: 2395 (January 1996)

Mejdi Kaabi (Arabic: مجدي الكعبي 9 June 1961 - 28 June 2019) is a Tunisian chess player. He was awarded the title International Master by FIDE in 1982.

Kaabi qualified for the Chess World Cup 2011, where he was defeated by Sergey Karjakin in the first round.

== Personal life ==
Mejdi Kaabi has been born and lived in Tunis.

He was previously married to Naila Zouabi (Tunis) for a duration of less than two years during which they had a son named Achref.

== Death ==
His brothers, who had been searching for him for several days after his disappearance, discovered him dead in his own house.
