= Diego Di Berardino =

Brazilian chess player (born 1987)

Personal information
- Born: July 29, 1987 (age 38) Rio de Janeiro, Brazil

Chess career
- Country: Brazil
- Title: International Master (2007)
- FIDE rating: 2466 (July 2026)
- Peak rating: 2528 (August 2018)

Diego Rafael Di Berardino (born 29 July 1987, in Rio de Janeiro) is a Brazilian chess International Master. He took part in the Chess World Cup 2011, but was knocked out in the first round by Gata Kamsky.

== Chess career ==
Di Berardino learned to play chess when he was five years old through his father. At the age of nine, his teacher asked his class who knew how to play chess because there was going to be a championship. Di Berardino, then playing chess only as a hobby, subscribed with his teacher and went to his first serious match.

In 2007, at the age of nineteen, Diego obtained his International master title. Diego currently holds one Grandmaster norm. He is at the Top 20 players in Brasil, according to the World Chess Federation ranking.
