= Vadim Malakhatko =

Ukrainian chess grandmaster (1977–2023)

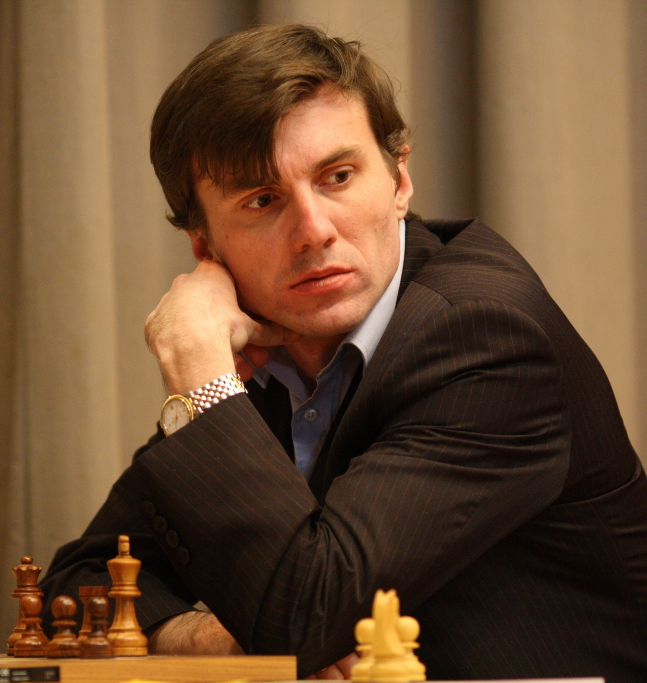
- Malakhatko in 2009

Personal information
- Born: Вадим Малахатко; 22 March 1977 Kyiv, Ukrainian SSR, Soviet Union
- Died: 5 June 2023 (aged 46) Kyiv, Ukraine
- Spouse: Anna Zozulia

Chess career
- Country: Ukraine
- Title: Grandmaster (1999)
- Peak rating: 2633 (October 2008)
- Peak ranking: No. 98 (October 2008)

Vadim Volodymyrovych Malakhatko (Ukrainian: Вадим Володимирович Малахатько; 22 March 1977 – 5 June 2023) was a Ukrainian chess grandmaster. He was a member of the gold medal-winning Ukrainian team at the 2001 World Team Chess Championship. In 2000, he won with the Ukrainian team a bronze medal in the 34th Chess Olympiad in Istanbul.

Malakhatko died in Kyiv of a heart attack on 5 June 2023, at the age of 46.

== Chess career ==
- 1999 – came second at Alushta tournament
- 2004 – tied for first with Petar Genov in the 3rd Condom Chess Open
- 2006 – won Politiken Cup in Copenhagen
- 2007 – tied for 2nd–4th with Loek van Wely and Alexei Fedorov in the President's Cup in Baku
- 2007 – tied for 2nd–7th with Kiril Georgiev, Dimitrios Mastrovasilis, Mircea Pârligras, Hristos Banikas and Dmitry Svetushkin in the Acropolis International Chess Tournament
- 2007/08 – tied for first with Nidjat Mamedov and Valeriy Neverov in the Hastings International Chess Congress
- 2009 – came in first at the Arcapita Open in Bahrain
- 2009 – tied for 2nd–3rd with Edvīns Ķeņģis at the Al Saleh 8th International Open in Yemen
- 2009 – tied for 3rd–8th with Anton Filippov, Elshan Moradiabadi, Merab Gagunashvili, Alexander Shabalov and Niaz Murshed in the Ravana Challenge Tournament in Colombo
- 2010 – tied for 1st–3rd with Tigran Gharamian and Deep Sengupta at the 24th Open Pierre and Vacances
- 2011 – won the 8th edition of the Balagna Open in Corsica
- 2019 – tied for 2nd–3rd with Liu Zhaoqi at the 2nd Ferreira do Alentejo Open

On the May 2011 FIDE Elo rating list, Malakhatko had a rating of 2546. His handle on the Internet Chess Club was "Vadim77".

== Personal life ==
He was married to WGM Anna Zozulia.

== Notable games ==
- Vadim Malakhatko vs Bogdan Lalic, 83rd Hastings Chess Congress 2008, Queen's Gambit Accepted: Gunsberg Defense, Prianishenmo Gambit (D24), 1–0
- Vadim Malakhatko vs Jonathan Speelman, Isle of Man 2007, Queen's Indian Defense: Kasparov-Petrosian Variation, Petrosian Attack (E12), 1–0
- Vadim Malakhatko vs John K Shaw, Cappelle la Grande 2007, Slav Defense: General (D10), 1–0
