= Frank De La Paz Perdomo =

Cuban chess grandmaster (born 1975)

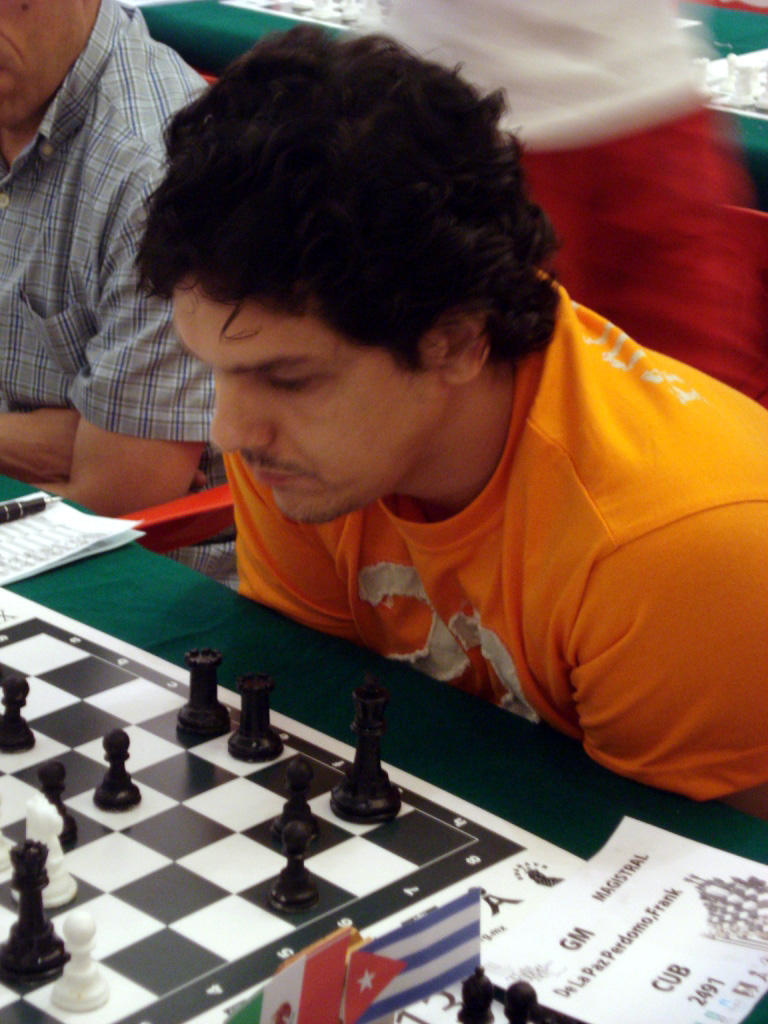
- Frank de la Paz Perdomo, Merida 2008

Personal information
- Born: May 24, 1975 (age 51) Santa Clara, Cuba

Chess career
- Country: Cuba
- Title: Grandmaster (2004)
- FIDE rating: 2445 (July 2026)
- Peak rating: 2495 (January 1999)

Frank De La Paz Perdomo (born 24 May 1975) is a Cuban chess player. He was awarded the title of Grandmaster (GM) by FIDE in 2004.

In 1998, he represented Cuba as 2nd reserve in the 33rd Chess Olympiad, scoring 1.5 out of 4.

He played in the Chess World Cup 2011, where he was defeated by Teimour Radjabov in the first round.
