= Hatim Ibrahim =

Egyptian chess player

Personal information
- Born: 1975 (age 50–51)

Chess career
- Country: Egypt
- Title: International Master (2011)
- Peak rating: 2414 (November 2011)

Hatim Ibrahim, born 1975) is an Egyptian chess player. He was awarded the title of International Master by FIDE in 2011.

Ibrahim qualified for the Chess World Cup 2011, where he was defeated by Shakhriyar Mamedyarov in the first round.
