= Elshan Moradi =

Iranian-American chess grandmaster (born 1985)

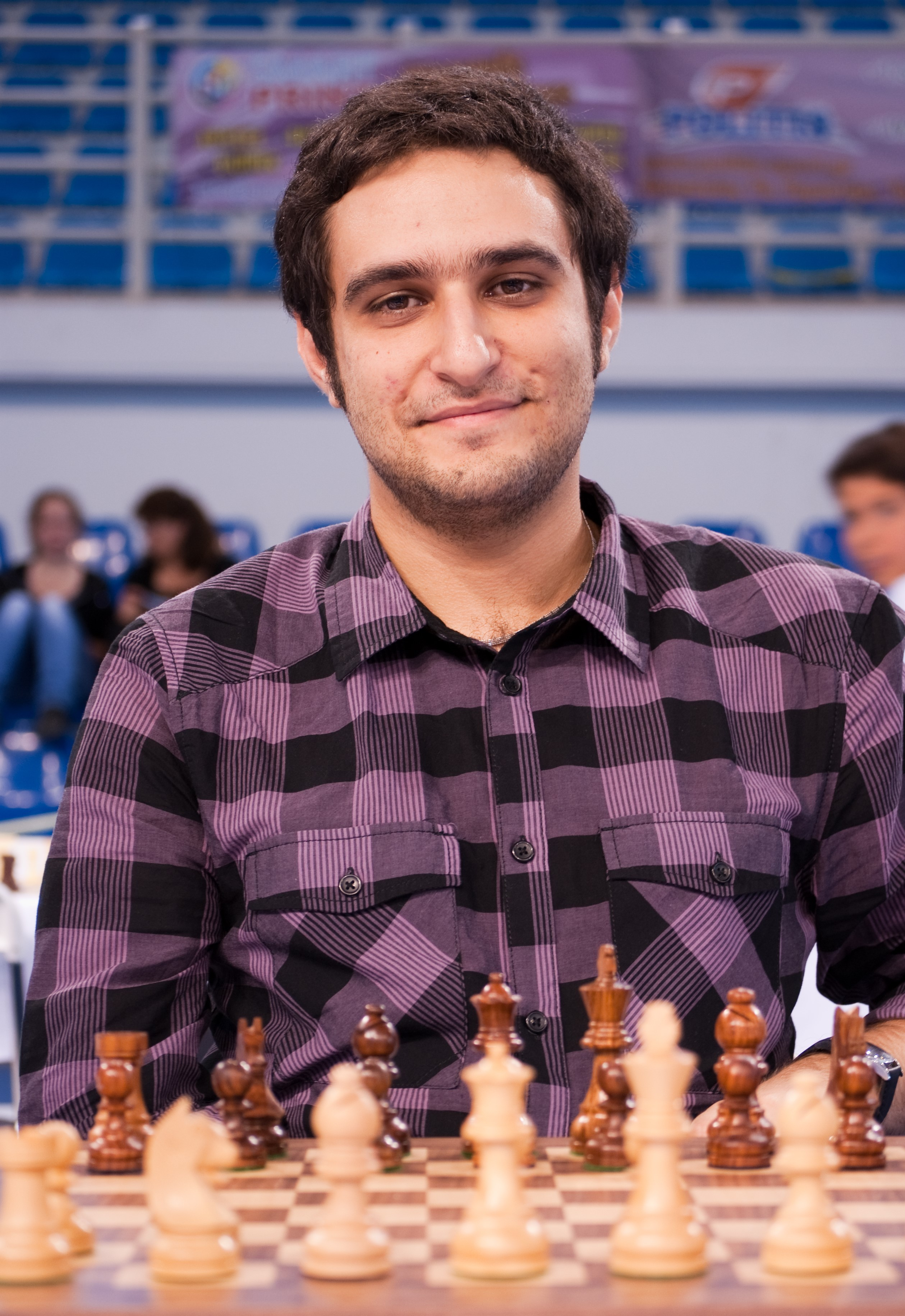
- Moradi in 2010

Personal information
- Born: Elshan Moradi Abadi; 22 May 1985 (age 41) Tehran, Iran

Chess career
- Country: Iran (until 2016); United States (since 2016)
- Title: Grandmaster (2005)
- FIDE rating: 2477 (October 2026)
- Peak rating: 2603 (March 2016)

Elshan Moradi Abadi (Persian: الشن مرادی ابدی; born 22 May 1985) is an Iranian and American chess grandmaster.

== Education ==
He has been studying in NODET Schools from 1996 until 2003. Having passed the university entrance exam in Iran, he had started to study in Sharif University of Technology. He graduated from Sharif University of Technology with the B.Sc degree in chemical engineering.

Moradi received his MBA degree from the Rawls College of Business.

== Biography ==
When he was 16, he won the 2001 Iranian Chess Championship with a score of 10/11, ahead of Ehsan Ghaem Maghami.

He was one of the members of Iran's national team in the first World Mind Sports Games held in Beijing (2008), in which the Iranian team surprisingly clinched third place ahead of Hungary, USA, and India.

In 2009 he tied for 3rd–8th with Anton Filippov, Vadim Malakhatko, Merab Gagunashvili, Alexander Shabalov and Niaz Murshed in the Ravana Challenge Tournament in Colombo.

He took part in the Chess World Cup 2011, but was eliminated in the first round by Leinier Domínguez.

He won the Final Four of collegiate chess with Texas Tech University in 2012. In 2015, he won the Pan-American Intercollegiate Team Chess Championship for the first time with the Texas Tech University chess team.

Moradi, in February 2016, became the second Iranian chess player to reach 2600 Elo after Ehsan Ghaem Maghami, and in the following month, he scored 2603 in his own personal record. In the same year, he won the Washington International tournament ahead of Gata Kamsky and Ilya Smirin.

Moradi began representing the United States Chess Federation in February 2017.

In 2019, Moradi tied for first place at the U.S. Masters Chess Championship.

In 2022, Moradi shared 1st place in the 122nd U.S. Chess Open with Aleksey Sorokin with a score of 8/9 but lost in tie-breaks. As Sorokin represents Russia, this qualified Moradi for the 2022 US Championship.
