= Barış Esen =

Turkish chess grandmaster (born 1986)

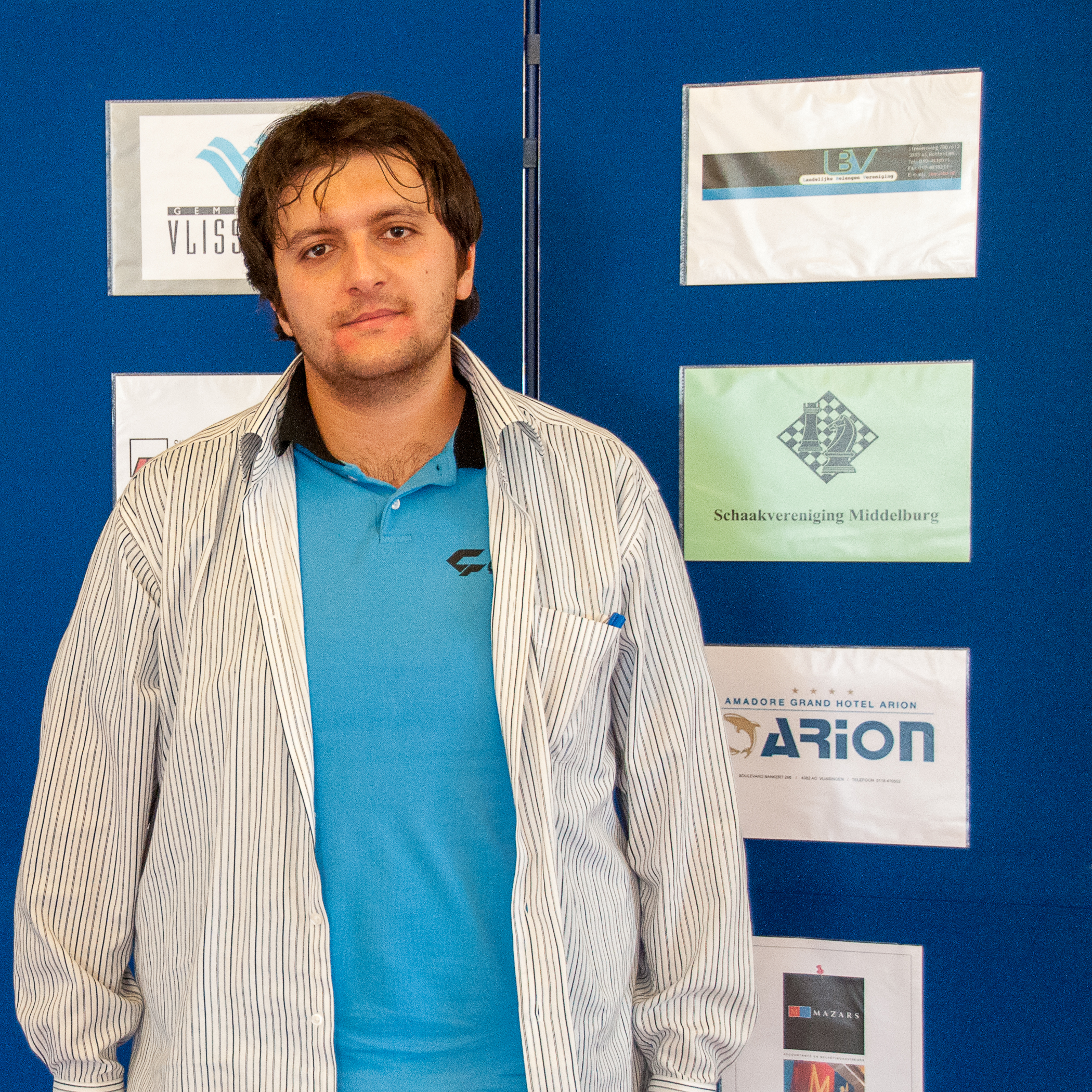
- Barış Esen (2012)

Personal information
- Born: November 3, 1986 (age 39)

Chess career
- Country: Turkey
- Title: Grandmaster (2010)
- FIDE rating: 2446 (July 2026)
- Peak rating: 2593 (September 2014)

Barış Esen (born November 3, 1986) is a Turkish chess grandmaster. As of the July 2013 FIDE rating list, he is ranked among active players number 369 in the world and number five in Turkey. He earned FIDE titles as International Master (IM) in 2005 and Grand Master (GM) on July 25, 2010.

== Career ==
He was born on November 3, 1986. He began playing chess in his early childhood in the late 1990s. Azerbaijani International Master Fikret Sideifzade, whom he met during a chess competition in Antalya, taught him the chess basics.

After his success at the Angora Tournament held in Konya, Turkey in 2010, he was named Grand Master, earning this title as the youngest and the fourth Turkish chess player.

Upon his result of 7½/11 at the European Individual Chess Championship held in Aix-les-Bains, France in 2011, Barış Esen qualified as the only participant of his country at the Chess World Cup 2011 in Khanty-Mansiysk, Russia. He lost in the first round to Olexandr Moiseenko from Ukraine with ½–1½.

== Personal life ==
Esen is married to Nesibe Esen. The couple has a son Emin, who was born on October 7, 2010. He is a resident of Adana.

== Achievements ==
- 2009 Thessaloniki Open, Greece – 2nd
- 2009 Angora Tournament, Turkey – 1st
- 2010 Thessaloniki Open, Greece – 2nd
