= Manuel León Hoyos =

Mexican chess grandmaster (born 1989)

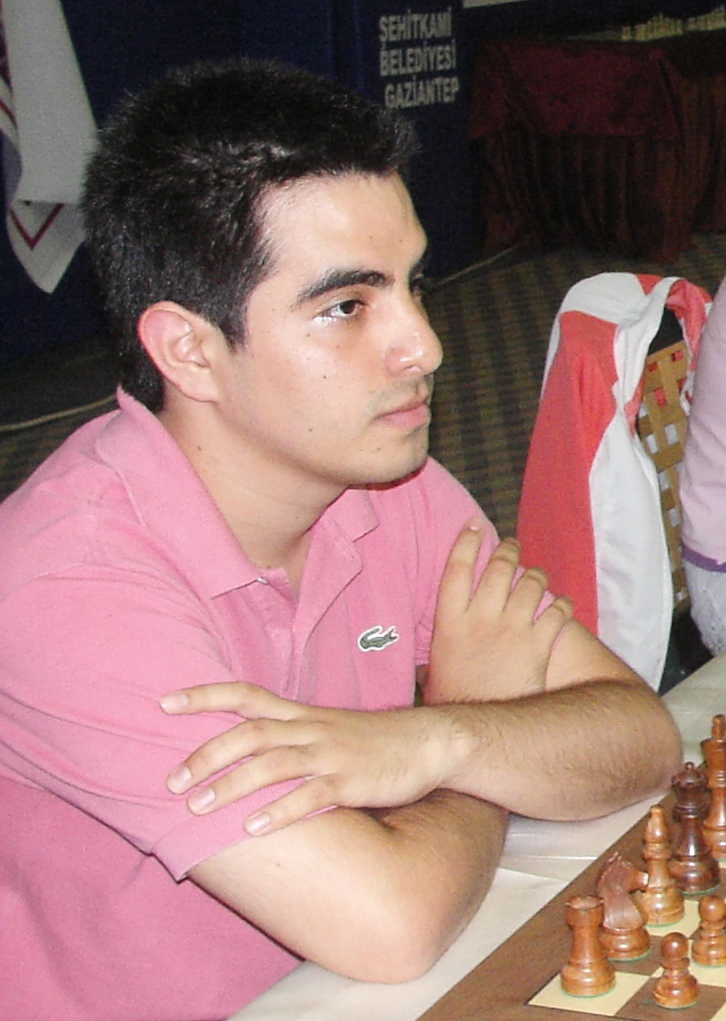
- Manuel Leon Hoyos at the World Junior Championship in Gaziantep, Turkey in 2008

Personal information
- Born: February 10, 1989 (age 37) Mérida, Yucatán, Mexico

Chess career
- Country: Mexico
- Title: Grandmaster (2008)
- FIDE rating: 2465 (August 2026)
- Peak rating: 2603 (October 2012)

Manuel León Hoyos (born February 10, 1989) is a Mexican chess Grandmaster. He is the first Mexican chess player to break 2600 Elo in the official FIDE rating list with 2603 in October 2012.

== Chess career ==
León Hoyos achieved the Grandmaster title at the age of 18. He has been Mexican champion and has won numerous international tournaments including the 2012 U.S. Open.

León Hoyos has represented Mexico in three Olympiads: Russia (2010), Turkey (2012), and Norway (2014). And at the World Mind Sports Games in China (2008). He took part in the Chess World Cup 2011 in Russia and was eliminated by Grandmaster Alexei Shirov. León Hoyos placed 5th in the 2012 Ibero-American Championship in Ecuador, 7th in the 2007 American Continental Championship in Colombia and 5th in the 2008 Pan-American Championship in the United States. He also placed 7th in the under-18 World Championship in 2007 held in Turkey.

León Hoyos tied for 1st place in the 2010 Arctic Chess Challenge in Norway with Grandmaster Mikhail Kobalia. He tied for 1st place at the 2013 Las Vegas Chess Festival together with Grandmaster Wesley So. León Hoyos won the 2012 Mexican Open. He placed 3rd place in the 2012 UNAM Chess Festival, a rapid and blindfold invitational tournament won by World's No. 1 Magnus Carlsen.

León Hoyos has worked with Grandmaster Vassily Ivanchuk, former World's No. 2, World Blitz Championship in 2007 and World Rapid Championship in 2016. He has served him as a second in several tournaments.

== Notable games ==
- Manuel Leon Hoyos vs Baadur Jobava, 2010, 1-0
- Ivan Cheparinov vs Manuel Leon Hoyos, 2006, 0-1
- Judit Polgar vs Manuel Leon Hoyos, 2012, 1/2-1/2
- Manuel Leon Hoyos vs Alexei Shirov, 2011, 1/2-1/2
- Manuel Leon Hoyos vs Lazaro Bruzon Batista, 2007, 1-0

== Education ==
In 2012, he received a scholarship to attend Webster University in St. Louis, Missouri and became part of the Webster University chess team, coached by former Women's World Champion and Grandmaster Susan Polgar. Between 2012 and 2017, Webster University was the ranked No. 1 chess team in the U.S. and 5-time collegiate national champion. In 2017, he graduated from Webster University with honors, receiving a bachelor's degrees in Economics and International Relations and a Masters in International Relations.
