= Semen Dvoirys =

Russian chess grandmaster (born 1958)

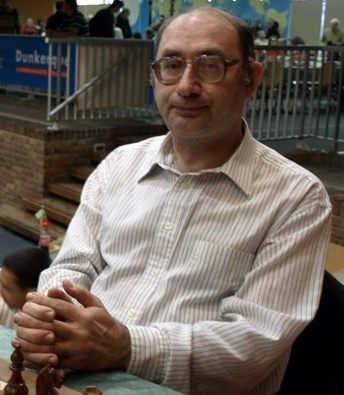
- Dvoirys in 2009

Personal information
- Born: Semyon Isaakovich Dvoirys; 2 November 1958 (age 67) Zhmerynka, Ukrainian SSR, Soviet Union

Chess career
- Country: Soviet Union → Russia
- Title: Grandmaster (1990)
- Peak rating: 2615 (July 1997)
- Peak ranking: No. 51 (July 1997)

Semen Isaakovich Dvoirys (Russian: Семён Исаакович Двойрис, romanized: Semyon Isaakovich Dvoyris; born 2 November 1958) is a Russian chess player. He was awarded the title Grandmaster by FIDE in 1990.

== Chess career ==
Dvoirys competed in the 1993 Interzonal tournament, held in Biel. In 2000, he took part in the inaugural Anatoly Karpov International tournament, a category 14 round-robin tournament in Poikovsky, Russia: he scored 3½ points from 9 games, tying for 7th-8th places.

In 2001, he tied for 1st–2nd places with Alexey Korotylev at Geneva Open. In 2010, he won the Izmailov Memorial tournament in Tomsk, tied for 1st-5th places in the A2 group of the Aeroflot Open with Aleksei Pridorozhni, Igor Glek, Sergey Pavlov and Mikhail Panarin, and tied for 1st–4th with Sergei Yudin, Pavel Smirnov and Sergei Iskusnyh at Pavlodar. In 2011 he came first in the Lev Polugaevsky Memorial tournament in Chelyabinsk.

Dvoirys played for the victorious team Russia 1 at the 2014 European Senior Team Chess Championship in Šibenik. He scored 6½/9 playing on the first board.

He competed at the 2017 Maccabiah Games.
