= Mircea Pârligras =

Romanian chess grandmaster (born 1980)

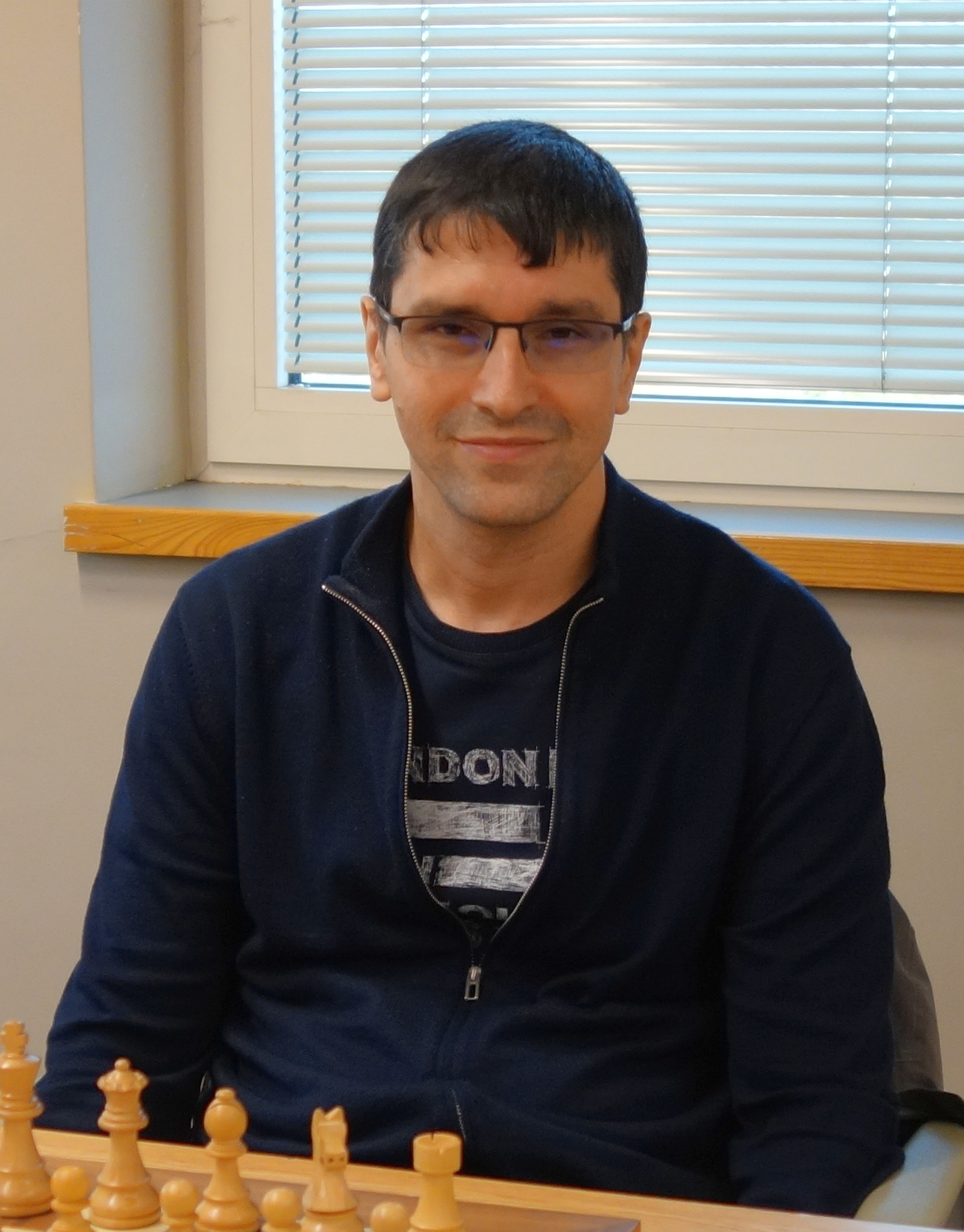
- Mircea Pârligras in 2023

Personal information
- Born: Mircea-Emilian Pârligras; 28 December 1980 (age 45) Pitești, Romania

Chess career
- Country: Romania
- Title: Grandmaster (2002)
- FIDE rating: 2507 (July 2026)
- Peak rating: 2657 (February 2019)
- Peak ranking: No. 95 (February 2019)

Mircea-Emilian Pârligras (born 28 December 1980) is a Romanian chess grandmaster and a two-time Romanian Chess Champion.

In 2007 he tied for 2nd–7th with Kiril Georgiev, Dimitrios Mastrovasilis, Vadim Malakhatko, Hristos Banikas and Dmitry Svetushkin in the Acropolis International Chess Tournament. In 2010, tied for 1st–6th with Yuriy Kryvoruchko, Gabriel Sargissian, Sergey Volkov, Bela Khotenashvili and Vladislav Borovikov in 2nd International Chess Tournament in Rethymno. In 2011, he tied for 2nd–4th with Borki Predojević and Hrant Melkumyan in 41st International Bosna Tournament in Sarajevo. He advanced through the 3rd round of the Khanty-Mansiysk 2011 World Cup after knocking out Yu Yangyi and Zoltán Almási. He was knocked out by Peter Heine Nielsen in the rapid tiebreaks.

He played for Romania in the Chess Olympiads of 2002, 2004, 2006 and 2008.
