= Stelios Halkias =

Greek chess grandmaster (born 1980)

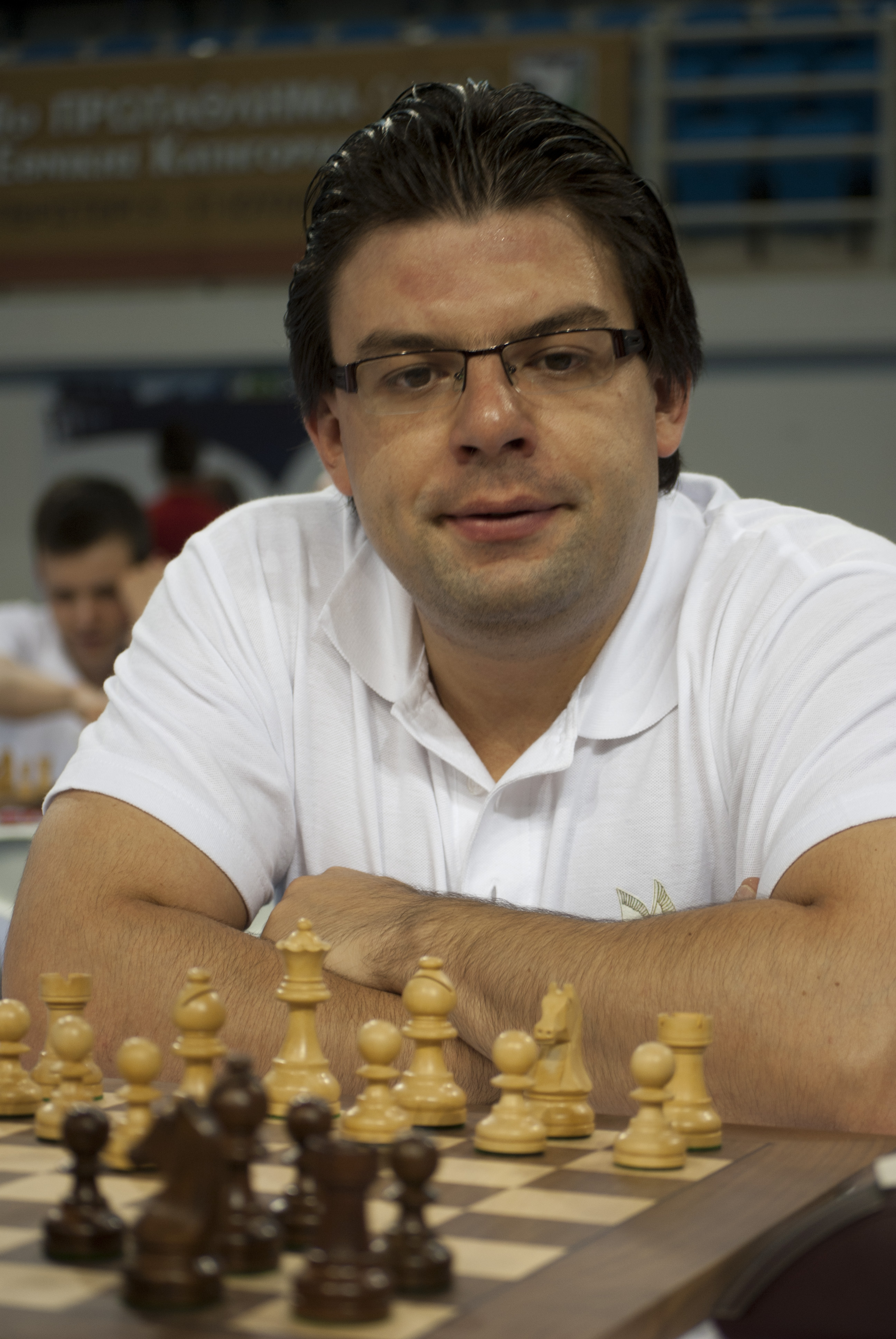
- Stelios Halkias, 2010

Personal information
- Born: April 11, 1980 (age 46)

Chess career
- Country: Greece
- Title: Grandmaster (2002)
- FIDE rating: 2498 (July 2026)
- Peak rating: 2602 (May 2011)

Stelios Halkias (born 11 April 1980) is a Greek chess player. He was awarded the title of Grandmaster (GM) by FIDE in 2002.

== Chess career ==
He has represented his country in a number of Chess Olympiads, including 2000, 2002, 2004, 2006, 2008, 2010 and 2012.

He played in the Chess World Cup 2011, losing to Alexander Morozevich in the first round.
