= Dimitrios Mastrovasilis =

Greek chess grandmaster (born 1983)

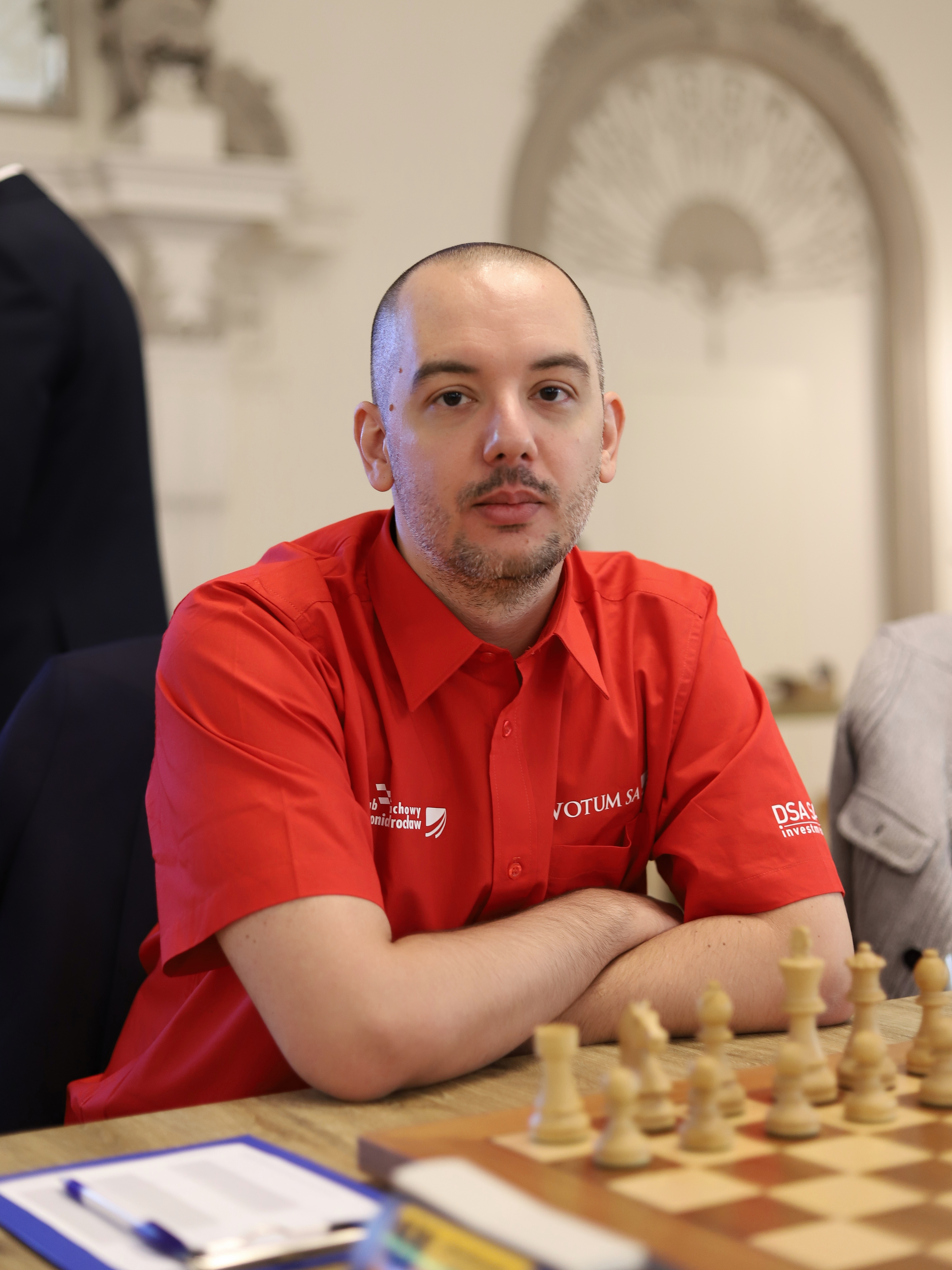
- Mastrovasilis in Polish Team Chess Championship "Ekstraliga" (2021)

Personal information
- Born: 12 June 1983 (age 43)

Chess career
- Country: Greece
- Title: Grandmaster (2003)
- FIDE rating: 2525 (July 2026)
- Peak rating: 2631 (January 2012)

Dimitrios Mastrovasilis (Greek: Δημήτριος Μαστροβασίλης; born 12 June 1983) is a Greek chess grandmaster. He competed in the FIDE World Chess Championship in 2004 and the FIDE World Cup in 2017 and 2023.

== Career ==
Dimitrios Mastrovasilis is a Greek grandmaster. Mastrovasilis took the silver medal in the under 18 division at the European Youth Chess Championships of 2000. In 2003 Mastrovasilis won the 1st Mediterranean Junior Championship in Ajelat, Libya. The following year he tied for 1st–2nd with Kiril Georgiev at Topola. In 2007 he tied for 2nd–7th with Kiril Georgiev, Vadim Malakhatko, Mircea Pârligras, Hristos Banikas and Dmitry Svetushkin in the Acropolis International Chess Tournament. In 2012 he won the Artemis Cup in Leros.

Mastrovasilis participated in the FIDE World Cup in 2017 and in 2023. In 2017 he was eliminated in 1st round by the Bulgarian GM Ivan Cheparinov losing 1.5 — 0.5 in their match. In 2023, he eliminated the Austrian GM Felix Blohberger in the tiebreaks and advanced to round 2, where he was eliminated by the Indian GM Vidit Gujrathi, also in the tiebreaks.

In team events, Mastrovasilis represented Greece in the Chess Olympiad, the World Team Chess Championship and the European Team Chess Championship. In 2016, he was part of team Europe, which defeated team Poland in the 8th Lublin Union Memorial.

== Personal life ==
His brother is chess grandmaster Athanasios Mastrovasilis.
