= Evgeny Tomashevsky =

Russian chess grandmaster (born 1987)

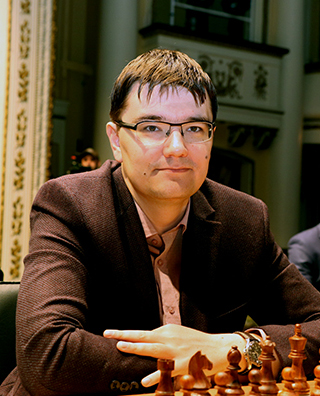
- Tomashevsky in 2018

Personal information
- Born: Evgeny Yuryevich Tomashevsky; 1 July 1987 (age 39) Saratov, Russian SFSR, Soviet Union

Chess career
- Country: Russia
- Title: Grandmaster (2005)
- FIDE rating: 2681 (July 2026)
- Peak rating: 2758 (September 2015)
- Peak ranking: No. 13 (September 2015)

Evgeny Yuryevich Tomashevsky (Russian: Евгений Юрьевич Томашевский; born 1 July 1987) is a Russian chess player. He was awarded the title of Grandmaster by FIDE in 2005. Tomashevsky is a two-time Russian Chess Champion (2015, 2019) and the 2009 European Chess Champion. He competed in the FIDE World Cup in 2007, 2009, 2011, 2013, 2015, 2017, 2019 and 2021

== Career ==
Tomashevsky was born in Saratov on 1 July 1987. He won the Russian under-10 championship in 1997 and the Russian under-18 championship in 2001, at the age of 13 years, in Rybinsk with a score of 9½ points from 11 games. In 2004 he finished runner-up in the U18 division of the World Youth Chess Championships.

In 2007, he came second in the Aeroflot Open. In 2009, Tomashevsky won the 10th European Individual Chess Championship after tie-breaks. The decisive match against Vladimir Malakhov went into armageddon stadium, where Malakhov blundered a rook in a winning position. In January 2010, he played for the gold medal-winning Russian team at the World Team Chess Championship 2009 in Bursa.

In 2011, he tied for first place with Nikita Vitiugov and Lê Quang Liêm in the Aeroflot Open, placing third on a tiebreak. He was one of the seconds to Boris Gelfand for the World Chess Championship 2012.

In February 2015, Tomashevsky took clear first place in the Tbilisi leg of the FIDE Grand Prix 2014–15 series scoring 8/11, 1½ points ahead of second-placed Dmitry Jakovenko, with no losses and wins over Baadur Jobava, Alexander Grischuk, Shakhriyar Mamedyarov, Maxime Vachier-Lagrave and Rustam Kasimdzhanov. His performance rating in this tournament was 2916. In August 2015, he won the Russian Championship Superfinal in Chita, Zabaykalsky Krai with 7½/11. The following year, he played for bronze medal-winning team Russia in the 42nd Chess Olympiad in Baku. In 2019 Tomashevsky won his second Russian Championship in Votkinsk – Izhevsk, Udmurtia with a score of 7/12.

Partly for being a mostly positional player, partly for wearing glasses and being well-educated, Tomashevsky earned himself the nickname "Professor" among the chessplayers.

In 2025, it was reported that Tomashevsky was the leader of a team of seven grandmaster coaches that the Russian Chess Federation had assigned to the ten-year-old chess prodigy Roman Shogdzhiev.
