= Evgeny Alekseev (chess player) =

Russian-Israeli chess grandmaster (born 1985)

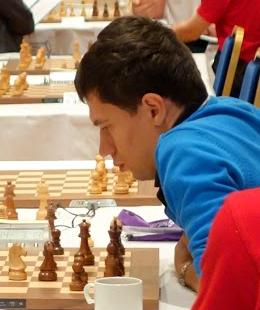
- Alekseev at Chess World Cup 2013

Personal information
- Native name: Евгений Алексеев
- Born: Evgeny Vladimirovich Alekseev; 28 November 1985 (age 40) Pushkin, Russian SFSR, Soviet Union

Chess career
- Country: Russia (until March 2023); Israel (since March 2023)
- Title: Grandmaster (2001)
- FIDE rating: 2500 (July 2026)
- Peak rating: 2725 (September 2009)
- Peak ranking: No. 14 (October 2007)

Evgeny Vladimirovich Alekseev (Russian: Евгений Владимирович Алексеев; born 28 November 1985) is a Russian chess grandmaster and Russian champion in 2006. He competed in the FIDE World Chess Championship 2004 and the FIDE World Cup in 2005, 2007, 2009, 2011 and 2013.

== Career ==
He won the gold medal in chess at the 2001 Maccabiah Games. In 2006 Alekseev won the Russian Championship Superfinal after defeating Dmitry Jakovenko in a playoff match. By winning the 2007 Aeroflot Open in Moscow, Alekseev qualified for the 2007 Dortmund Sparkassen Chess Meeting. In this latter event he shared the second place – behind World Champion Vladimir Kramnik – with Viswanathan Anand and Péter Lékó. In the same year, he played for the Russian team that won the gold medal in the European Team Chess Championship. In 2008 Alekseev won the 41st Biel Chess Festival after a playoff with Leinier Domínguez.

In 2010 he played on board 2 for team "Russia 2" at the 39th Chess Olympiad, held in Khanty-Mansiysk, Russia. His team finished sixth. He tied for first place with Sergey Karjakin, Peter Svidler, Dmitry Jakovenko, Dmitry Andreikin and Vladimir Potkin in the 2012 Russian Championship Superfinal. After the rapid playoff to determine the winner, Alekseev finished sixth. In the European Individual Chess Championship of 2013, he tied for first place with nine other players points and took the silver medal on tiebreak. In 2017, Alekseev won the championship of Saint Petersburg and the Viktor Korchnoi Memorial in St. Petersburg, this latter edging out Dmitry Kokarev, Gata Kamsky and Aleksandr Shimanov on tiebreak. In 2019, he won the 2nd Ferreira do Alentejo Open with a score of 7.5/9 points.

Preceded by Sergei Rublevsky	Russian Chess Champion; 2006	Succeeded by Alexander Morozevich
