= Igor Lysyj =

Russian chess grandmaster and writer (born 1987)

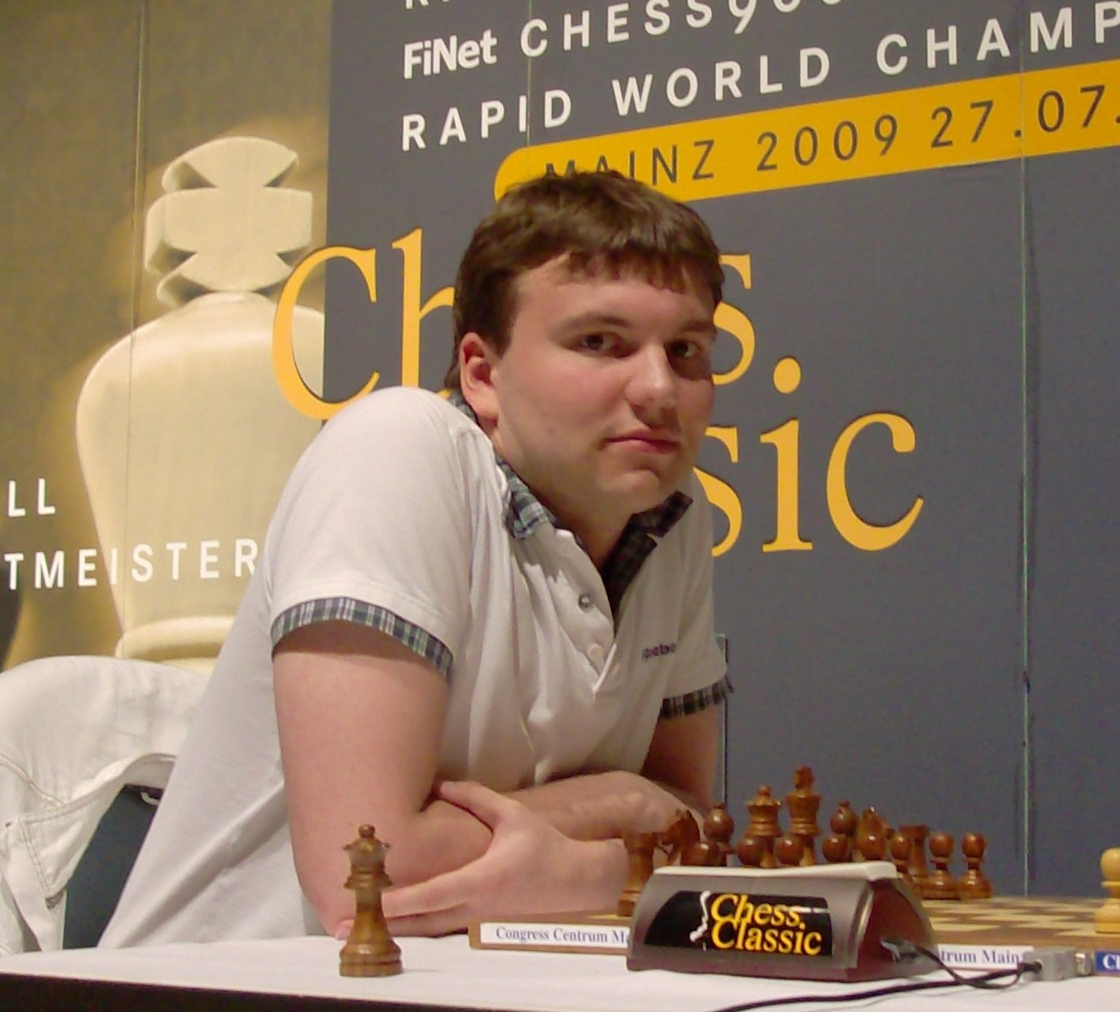

Personal information
- Born: Igor Ilyich Lysyj; 1 January 1987 (age 39) Sverdlovsk, Russian SFSR, Soviet Union
- Spouse: Olga Girya

Chess career
- Country: Russia (until 2023); FIDE (since 2023)
- Title: Grandmaster (2007)
- FIDE rating: 2518 (July 2026)
- Peak rating: 2700 (January 2015)
- Peak ranking: No. 45 (January 2015)

Igor Ilyich Lysyj (Игорь Ильич Лысый; born 1 January 1987) is a Russian chess player and writer. He was awarded the title of Grandmaster by FIDE in 2007. Lysyj was Russian champion in 2014.

Together with 43 other Russian chess players, Lysyj signed an open letter to Russian president Vladimir Putin, protesting against the 2022 Russian invasion of Ukraine and expressing solidarity with the Ukrainian people.

== Chess career ==
Lysyj was a member of the Russian team that placed fourth in the 2003 Under-16 Chess Olympiad in Denizli, Turkey. He won the silver medal for his performance (score of 6/8 points) on the reserve board.

Lysyj won the Russian junior rapid chess championship in 2004. In 2006 he tied for first place with Roman Ovetchkin in the Zudov Memorial. In 2007 he was awarded the grandmaster title and won the main event (Young Masters) of the Euro Chess Tournament in Hengelo, the Netherlands. In 2008 he finished tied for first (second on tiebreak) at the 10th World University Chess Championship, held in Novokuznetsk.

In 2009, he tied for first in the 13th Voronezh open tournament, finishing second on countback. In January 2010, Lysyj tied for first with Eduardas Rozentalis, Pavel Ponkratov, Radosław Wojtaszek and Luke McShane in the 39th Rilton Cup in Stockholm, placing fifth on tiebreak. He competed in the 2011 FIDE World Cup, where he knocked out Mikhail Kobalia and Alexander Ivanov in the first two rounds, then he was eliminated in round three by Leinier Domínguez Pérez.

In 2012 he won the Moscow Open. Lysyj took part in the 2013 FIDE World Cup, where he was eliminated by Levon Aronian in round two, after beating Andrei Istrățescu in the first round.

In June 2014, he won the Russian Championship Higher League in Vladivostok. This victory qualified him for the Russian Championship Superfinal, which took place in December. Lysyj won with a score of 5½/9.

At the 2015 FIDE World Cup Lysyj defeated Constantin Lupulescu in the first round and lost to Yu Yangyi in the second, thus exiting the competition. In February 2018, he tied for 4th-10th places in the Aeroflot Open, finishing 7th on tiebreak, with a score of 6/9, one point behind that of the winner, Vladislav Kovalev. Later in the same year, Lysyj acted as a second for Valentina Gunina in the Women's World Chess Championship tournament.

In September 2019, he competed in the FIDE World Cup, where he was eliminated in round one after losing to Jeffery Xiong. Two months later, Lysyj won the European Blitz Championship in Tallinn with a score of 17/22, edging out Zaven Andriasian and Andrey Esipenko on tiebreak.

== Books ==
- Igor Lysyj; Roman Ovetchkin (2012). The Berlin Defence. Chess Stars. ISBN 978-954-8782-89-0.
- Igor Lysyj; Roman Ovetchkin (2012). The Open Games for Black. Chess Stars. ISBN 978-954-8782-88-3.
- Igor Lysyj; Roman Ovetchkin (2017). The Hedgehog vs the English/Reti. Chess Stars. ISBN 9786197188134.

Sporting positions
Preceded by Peter Svidler	Russian Chess Champion; 2014	Succeeded by Evgeny Tomashevsky
