= Dmitry Jakovenko =

Russian chess grandmaster (born 1983)

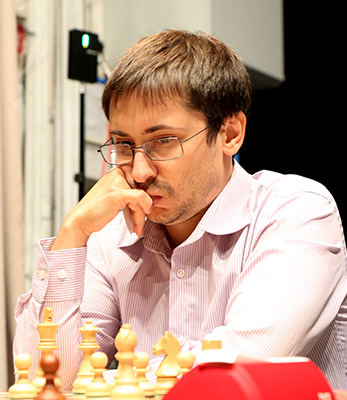
- Jakovenko in 2018

Personal information
- Born: Dmitry Olegovich Jakovenko; 29 June 1983 (age 43) Nizhnevartovsk, Russian SFSR, Soviet Union

Chess career
- Country: Russia
- Title: Grandmaster (2001)
- FIDE rating: 2682 (July 2026)
- Peak rating: 2760 (January 2009)
- Peak ranking: No. 5 (July 2009)

Dmitry Olegovich Jakovenko (Russian: Дмитрий Олегович Яковенко; born 29 June 1983) is a Russian chess player. He was awarded the title Grandmaster by FIDE in 2001. Jakovenko was European champion in 2012. He was a member of the gold medal-winning Russian team at the 2009 World Team Chess Championship and at the European Team Chess Championships of 2007 and 2015.

== Chess career ==
Jakovenko learned chess from his father at the age of three years and was later coached by Garry Kasparov's former trainer Alexander Nikitin. In 2001 he won the Under 18 section of the World Youth Chess Championships and the Saint-Vincent Open.

Jakovenko tied for first place in the Russian Championship Superfinal 2006, but lost the playoff against Evgeny Alekseev, got second place at Pamplona 2006/2007, Corus B Group 2007, and Aeroflot Open 2007. He finished first in the Anatoly Karpov International Tournament (pl) in Poikovsky, Khanty-Mansi Autonomous Okrug, Russia in 2007, 2012 and 2018.

In the July 2009 FIDE world rankings Jakovenko became the fifth highest rated chess player in the world and overtook Vladimir Kramnik as the number one Russian (Kramnik regained the position in September that year). In the same month Jakovenko competed at the Dortmund Sparkassen Chess Meeting, finishing shared second with Peter Leko and Magnus Carlsen, fourth on tiebreak, with a score of 5½/10, one point behind Kramnik.

Jakovenko won the 2012 European Individual Chess Championship in Plovdiv with a score of 8½/11 points. He won the Russian Cup knockout tournament in 2013, 2014, 2016 and 2017. In December 2014, Jakovenko took second place, behind Igor Lysyj, in the Superfinal of the 67th Russian championship in Kazan.

In 2015 Jakovenko tied for first place with Hikaru Nakamura and Fabiano Caruana in the last stage of the FIDE Grand Prix series, held in Khanty Mansyisk, scoring 6½/11 points. He took first place on tiebreak and placed third in the Grand Prix overall standings with 310 points. In November 2017 Jakovenko shared first place with Levon Aronian in the last leg of the FIDE Grand Prix 2017 series, which took place in Palma, Majorca, taking first place on tiebreak.

In 2018, Jakovenko tied for 1st - 2nd place in the Superfinal of the 71st Russian championship in Satka, Chelyabinsk Oblast. He lost the rapid playoffs to Dmitry Andreikin and finished in second place.

== Notable chess games ==
- Evgeny Najer vs Dmitry Jakovenko, Russian Championship Superfinal 2006, Nimzo-Indian Defense: Romanishin Variation, English Hybrid (E20), 0-1
- Dmitry Jakovenko vs Emil Sutovsky, 8th Poikovsky Karpov Tournament 2007, Spanish Game: Open Variations, Main Lines (C80), 1-0
- Vugar Gashimov vs Dmitry Jakovenko, Elista Grand Prix 2008, Caro-Kann Defense: Classical Variation, Main lines (B18), ½-½
