= Vladimir Malakhov (chess player) =

Russian chess grandmaster (born 1980)

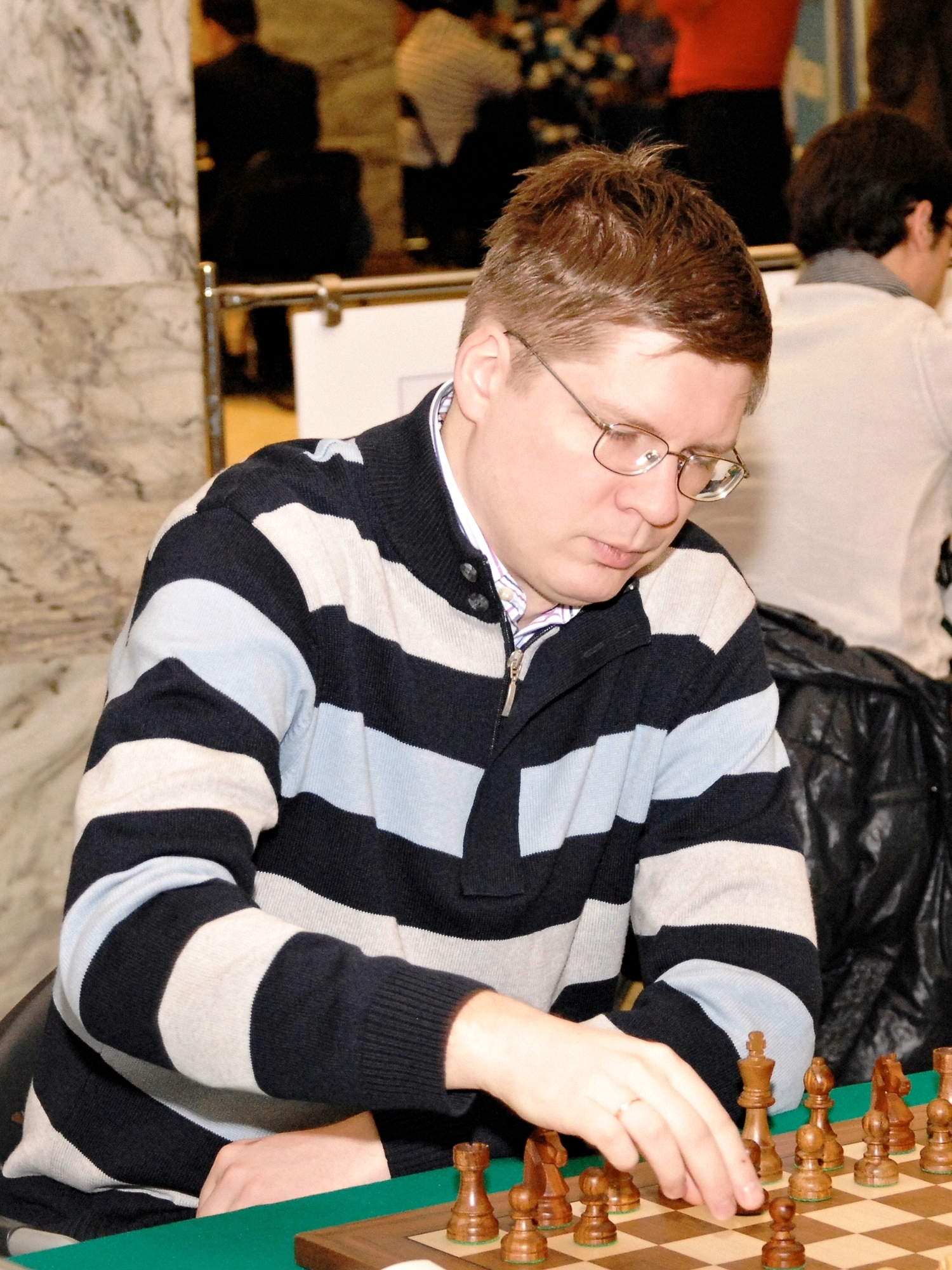
- Malakhov at the 2012 European Rapid Chess Championship in Warsaw

Personal information
- Born: 27 November 1980 (age 45) Ivanovo, Russian SFSR, Soviet Union (now Russia)

Chess career
- Country: Russia (until 2022); FIDE (since 2022)
- Title: Grandmaster (1998)
- FIDE rating: 2597 (July 2026)
- Peak rating: 2732 (July 2010)
- Peak ranking: No. 17 (April 2004)

Vladimir Nailievich Malakhov (Russian: Владимир Малахов; born 27 November 1980) is a Russian chess grandmaster. He was a member of the Russian team that won gold at the 2009 World Team Chess Championship.

== Career ==
Born in Ivanovo in 1980, Malakhov's father taught him to play chess at the age of five and he participated in his first tournament at age seven. He won the Under-12 Russian Championship in 1992 and won the World Under-14 Chess Championship in 1993. He earned his international master title in 1995 and his grandmaster tile in 1998.

He was the runner-up in the European Individual Chess Championship in 2003 and in 2009.

In the FIDE World Chess Championship 2000 and in the FIDE World Chess Championship 2004, Malakhov made it to the second round.

Malakhov finished 11th in the Chess World Cup 2005, which qualified him for the Candidates for the FIDE World Chess Championship 2007, being played in May–June 2007. He was eliminated in the first round, losing his match to Alexander Grischuk 3½–1½.

In 2006, Malakhov tied for the first place with Liviu-Dieter Nisipeanu and Magnus Carlsen at the Bosna International Tournament (category 17, 2659) in Sarajevo. In 2007 he won the 3rd Tournament of the Stars in Benidorm.

Malakhov reached the semifinal stage of the Chess World Cup 2009 and was eliminated by the eventual runner-up Ruslan Ponomariov, after sequentially defeating Bassem Amin, Ilia Smirin, Pavel Eljanov, Wesley So and Peter Svidler. This result qualified him for the Chess World Cup 2011, in which he was eliminated in the first round by Rubén Felgaer. He won the European Rapid Chess Championship of 2009 held in Warsaw.

He contributed to Russia's team gold at the 2009 World Team Championship, scoring 5/7 and this effort earned him the gold medal on board five. Malakhov played on the reserve board for the Russian team that won silver at the 39th Chess Olympiad.

In 2012, Malakhov finished equal second, third on tiebreak in the European Individual Championship with 8/11 and thus qualified for the Chess World Cup 2013. In the latter he defeated Eric Hansen and Laurent Fressinet, before losing to Fabiano Caruana in the third round. In September 2012, he came second in the Moscow Blitz Championship, behind Alexander Morozevich.

In February 2013, Malakhov placed equal first, second on tiebreak in the 2nd Vladimir Petrov Memorial, a rapid tournament held in Jūrmala, Latvia. At the 29th European Club Cup he helped his team "Malachite" to win silver.

In 2014, he finished second, behind Vassily Ivanchuk, at the Latvian Railway Rapid Open in Riga. In 2015, he won the Vladimir Petrov Memorial blitz tournament.

== Personal life ==
Both of Malakhov's parents are physicists; his father a researcher and his mother a lecturer at a university in Dubna. As of 2010, Malakhov is a part-time nuclear physicist and a father to two children.
