= Open event at the 42nd Chess Olympiad =

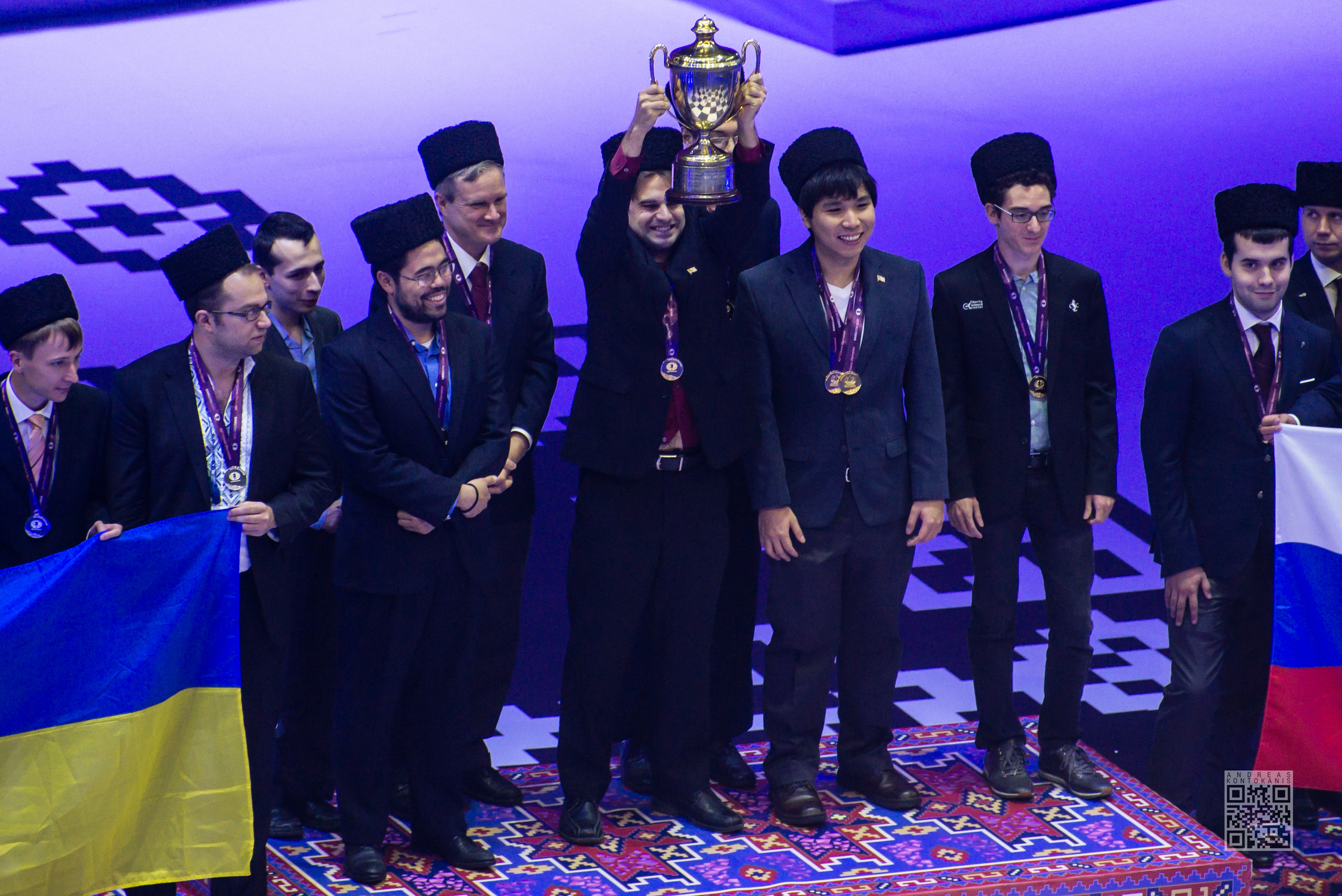
- Samuel Shankland of the United States raising the Hamilton Russell Cup
- Host city: Baku
- Country: Azerbaijan
- Nations: 175
- Teams: 180
- Athletes: 894
- Dates: 2–13 September 2016
- Main venue: Baku Crystal Hall

Medalists

Team
- 1st place, gold medalist(s): United States
- 2nd place, silver medalist(s): Ukraine
- 3rd place, bronze medalist(s): Russia

Individual
- Board 1: (Georgia (country)) Baadur Jobava
- Board 2: (Russia) Vladimir Kramnik
- Board 3: (United States) Wesley So
- Board 4: (France) Laurent Fressinet
- Reserve: (Ukraine) Andrei Volokitin

The open event at the 42nd Chess Olympiad, organised by the Fédération Internationale des Échecs (FIDE), was held from 2–13 September 2016 in Baku, Azerbaijan. It had to be contested by a record number of 180 teams representing 175 nations, however 10 of these did not arrive so the actual participation was 170 teams. Eritrea, Kosovo, and South Sudan all made their debut at the Chess Olympiads. A total of 894 players participated in the open event. The venue of the event was the Baku Crystal Hall.

The United States won the gold medal in the open event for the first time since 1976 and sixth time overall. Ukrainian player Andrei Volokitin, who played as a reserve player, was the best individual player in the open event with 8½ out of 9 points (eight wins and one draw) and a performance rating of 2992. Other players who won individual gold medals include Baadur Jobava of Georgia on board one, Vladimir Kramnik of Russia on board two, Wesley So of the United States on board three, and Laurent Fressinet of France on board four. However, the best scorer at the tournament was 64-year old Eugenio Torre of the Philippines, playing in a record 23rd Olympiad, who scored 10 out of 11 with a performance rating of 2836 and won the bronze medal on board three.

== Competition format and calendar ==
The tournament was played in a Swiss system format. The time control for all games was 90 minutes for the first 40 moves, after which an additional 30 minutes were granted and increment of 30 seconds per move was applied. Players were permitted to offer a draw at any time. A total of 11 rounds were played, with all teams playing in every round.

In each round, four players from each team faced four players from another team; teams were permitted one reserve player who could be substituted between rounds. The four games were played simultaneously on four boards, scoring 1 game point for a win and ½ game point for a draw. The scores from each game were summed together to determine which team won the round. Winning a round was worth 2 match points, regardless of the game point margin, while drawing a round was worth 1 match point. Teams were ranked in a table based on match points. Tie-breakers for the table were i) the Sonneborn-Berger system; ii) total game points scored; iii) the sum of the match points of the opponents, excluding the lowest one.

Tournament rounds started on 2 September and ended with the final round on 13 September. All rounds started at 15:00 AZST (UTC+5), except for the final round which started at 11:00 AZST (UTC+5). There was one rest day at the tournament, on 7 September after the fifth round.

All dates are AZST (UTC+5)

1	Round	RD	Rest day

September	2nd Fri	3rd Sat	4th Sun	5th Mon	6th Tue	7th Wed	8th Thu	9th Fri	10th Sat	11th Sun	12th Mon	13th Tue
Tournament round	1	2	3	4	5	RD	6	7	8	9	10	11

== Teams and players ==
The tournament featured eight out of the top ten players from the FIDE rating list published in August 2016; only former World Champion Viswanathan Anand and Levon Aronian were missing the Olympiad. Among the players who were playing in the open section were the World Champion and highest rated player in the world Magnus Carlsen, the challenger in the World Chess Championship 2016 Sergey Karjakin as well as the former World Champions Vladimir Kramnik and Veselin Topalov. Grandmaster Eugenio Torre was in the line-up of the Philippines for the record twenty-third time, having played on each Chess Olympiad since 1970 except in Dresden in 2008. On the other hand, Ukraine were weaker for Vassily Ivanchuk, who does not play for the first time after 14 consecutive Olympiads (1988-2014) and 13 appearances on board one (1990-2014). The former World Champion Challenger and leader of the Israeli team in 8 consecutive Olympiads (2000-2014) Boris Gelfand was also missing the Olympiad following a conflict with the Israeli Chess Federation management.

The strongest team of the tournament were Russia with an average rating of 2760. Captained by the president of the Russian Chess Federation and FIDE Vice President Andrey Filatov, the team consisted of the World Champion Challenger Sergey Karjakin, Vladimir Kramnik, Alexander Grischuk, Evgeny Tomashevsky and Ian Nepomniachtchi. Seven-time Russian Champion and the fourth highest ranked Russian player Peter Svidler was not included in the team. The United States were the second strongest team with three top ten players, Fabiano Caruana, Hikaru Nakamura and Wesley So, along with Ray Robson and Samuel Shankland. So and Shankland had proved prior to the Olympiad that they were in good form after winning the Sinquefield Cup 2016 and the Biel Chess Festival 2016, respectively. The defending champions China were the third team with highest average rating and the only team besides Russia whose all players had rating higher than 2700. They participated with the same line-up that won the gold medal except for Ni Hua who was replaced by Li Chao. The first team of the three that represented the host country Azerbaijan was the fourth strongest and completed the group with an average rating exceeding 2700 points. The only change in their line-up from the previous Chess Olympiad was Arkadij Naiditsch, a board one player for Germany in four Olympiads, who was playing instead of Gadir Guseinov.

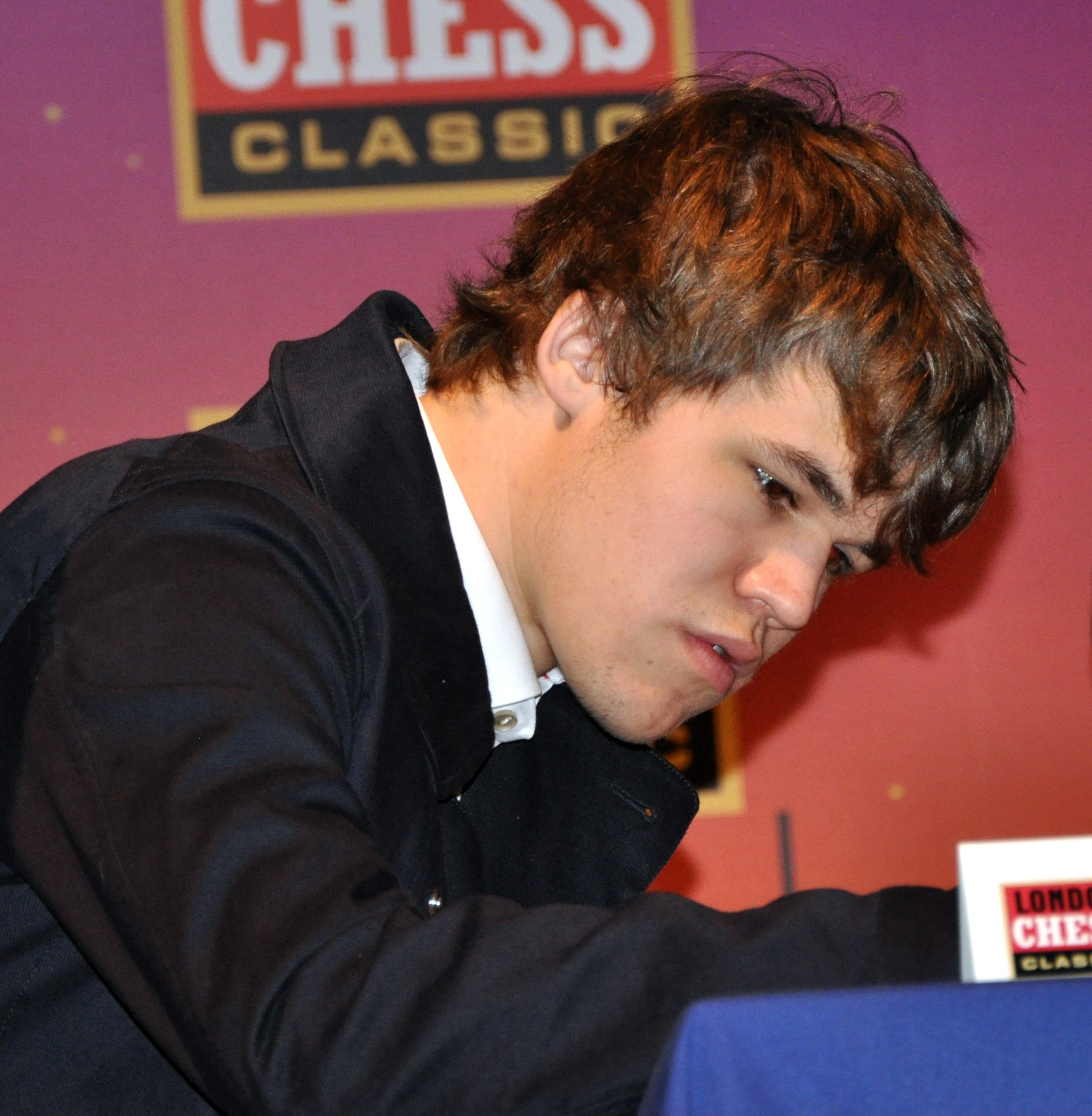
World Champion and world no. 1 Magnus Carlsen was playing on board one for Norway

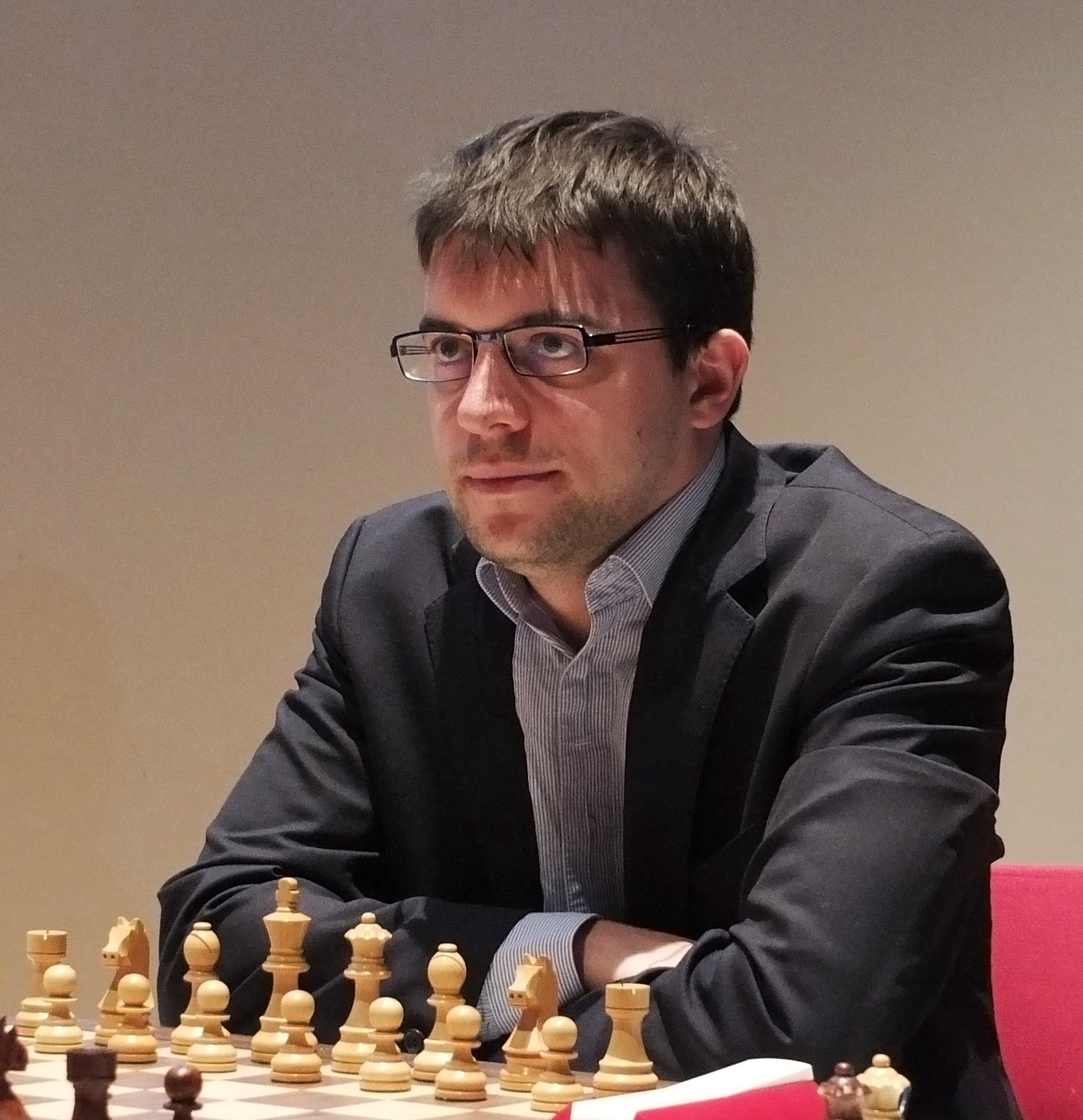
World no. 2 Maxime Vachier-Lagrave was playing on board one for France

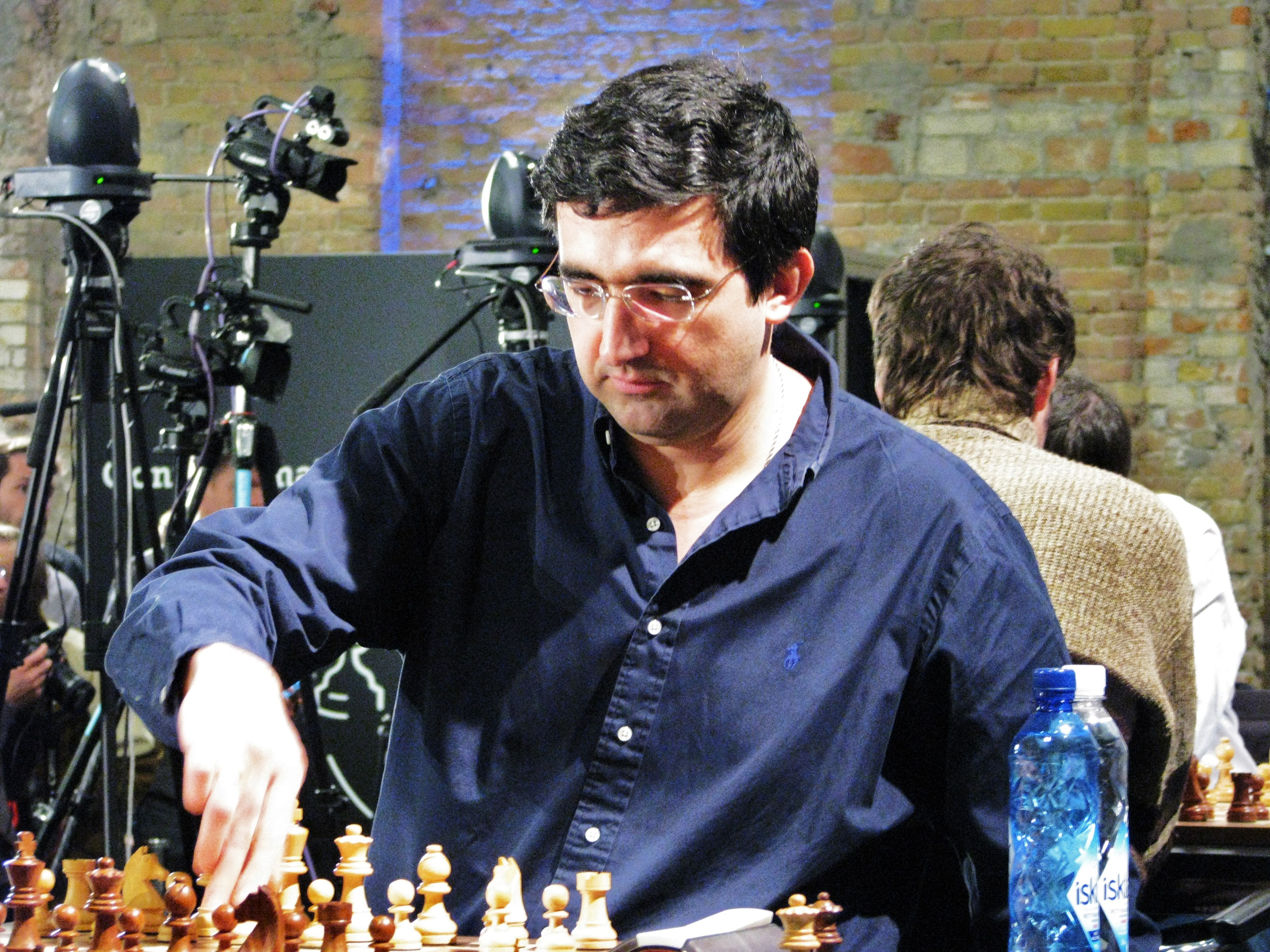
Former World Champion and world no. 3 Vladimir Kramnik was playing on board two for Russia

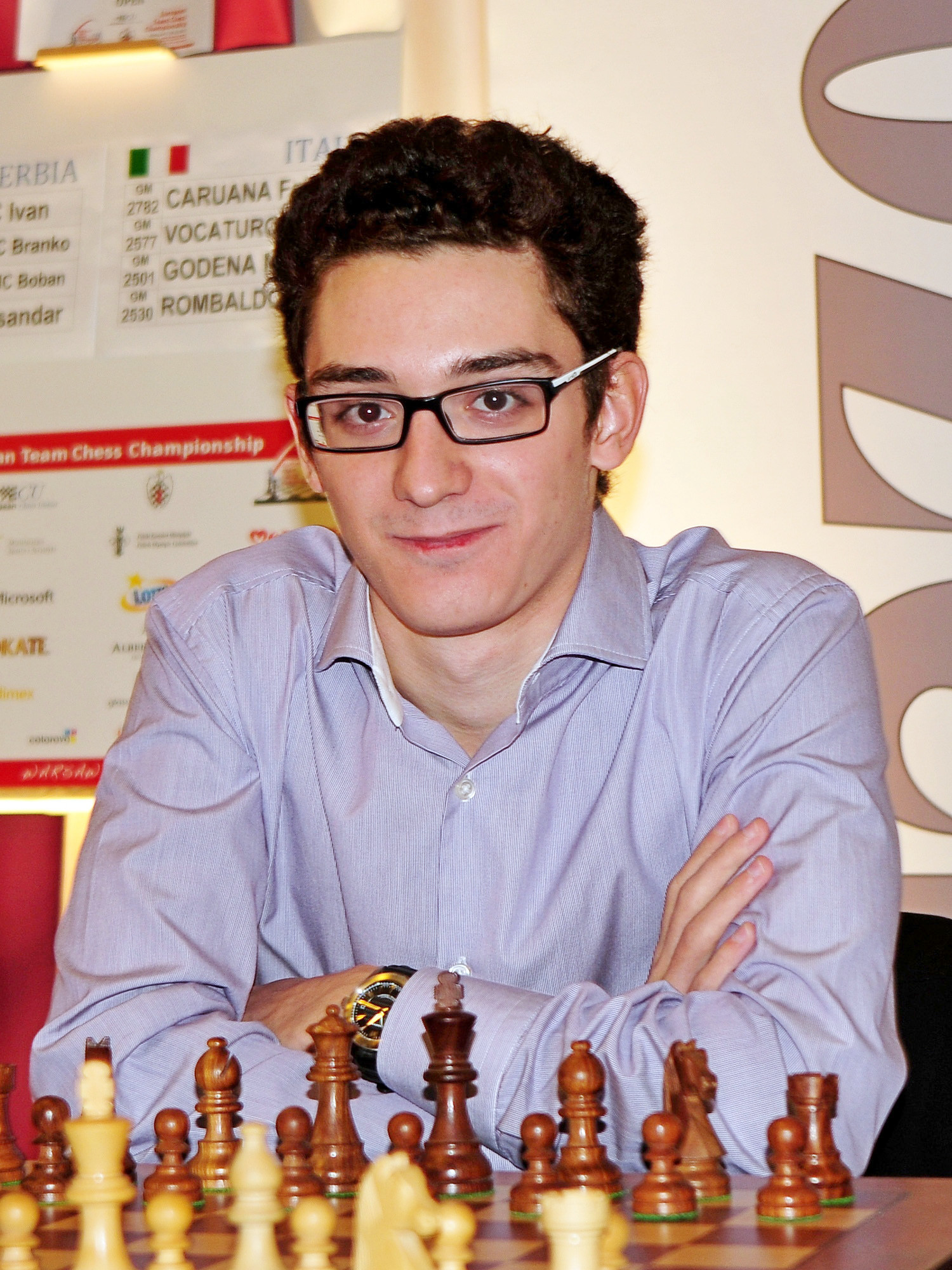
World no. 4 Fabiano Caruana was playing on board one for the United States

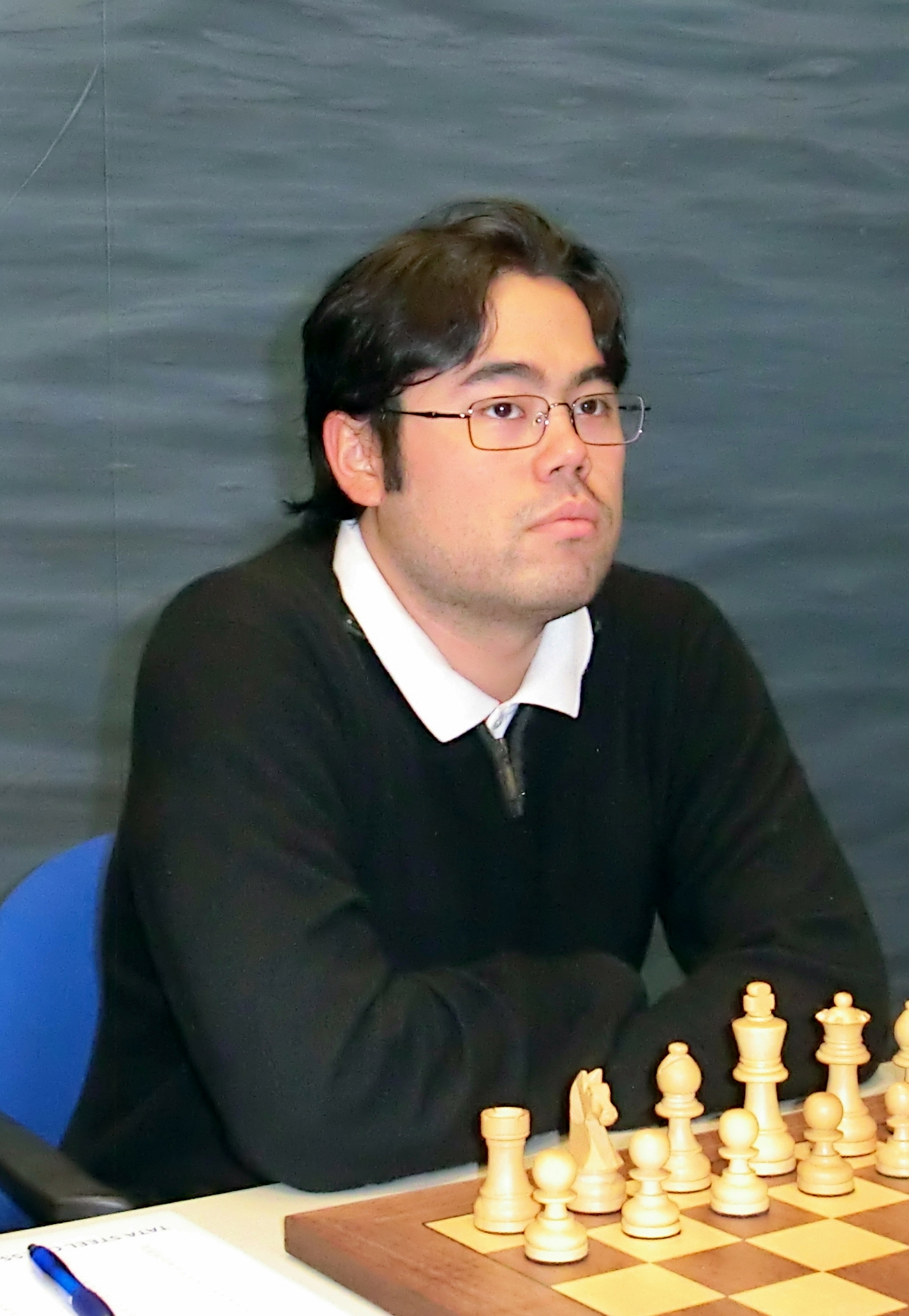
World no. 6 Hikaru Nakamura was playing on board two for the United States

== Prizes ==
The winning team in the open event received the International Hamilton-Russell Cup, which was offered by the English magnate Frederick Hamilton-Russell as a prize for the 1st Chess Olympiad and has since been awarded to the best team in the open event.

== Media and spectators ==
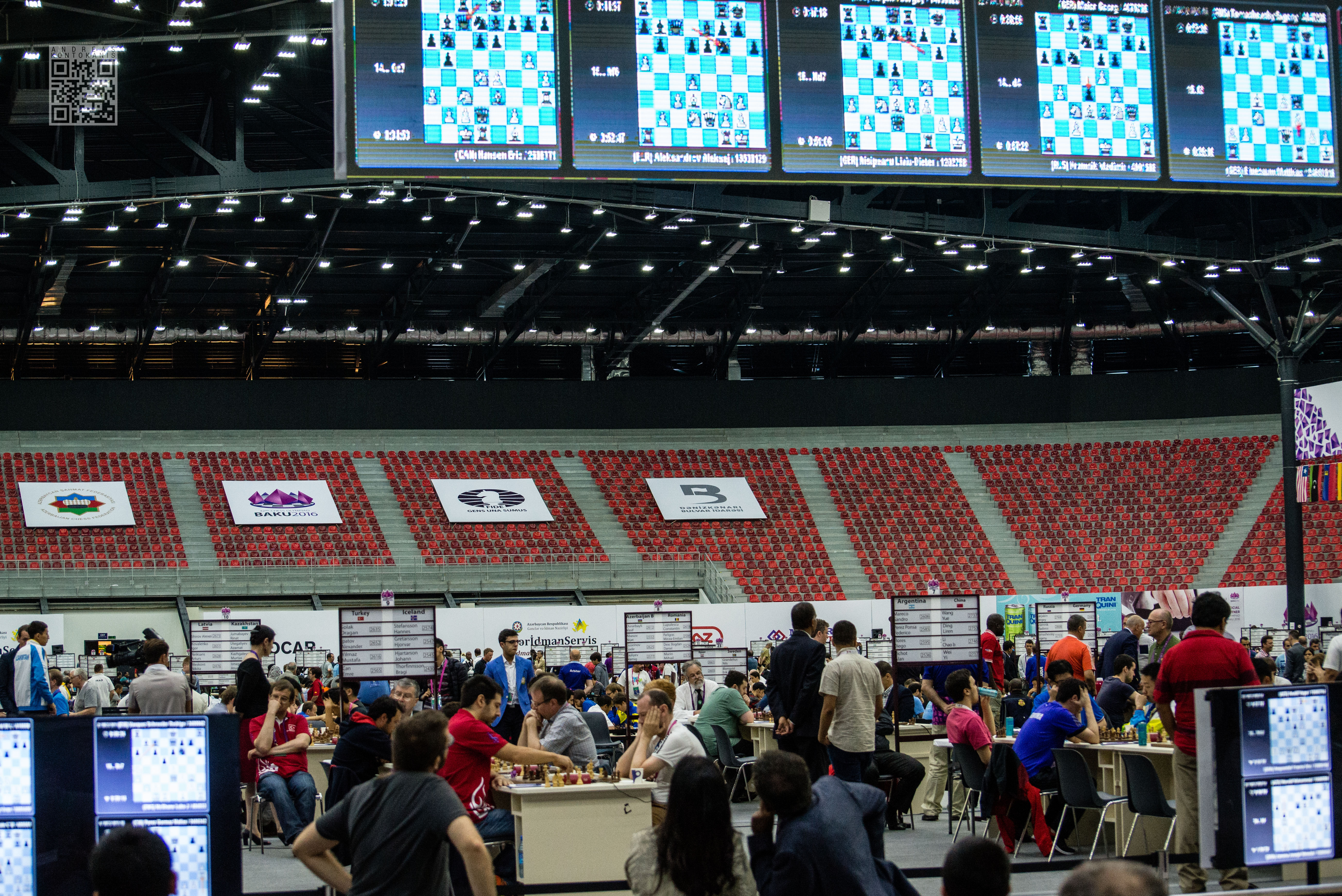
The playing hall with games broadcast on transmission screens

The media coverage of the event was allowed upon approval by the FIDE Press Officer. The event was broadcast from a media centre near the playing hall that consisted of working stations and information area equipped with clearly marked notice boards for news and results service. All people with access to the media centre must have received official credentials.

The spectators attending the event were located in a spectator area clearly separated from the playing area. Spectators could also enter the playing hall and watch the matches directly without disturbing the players. The media staff members entering the playing hall were also considered spectators with exceptions applied to their activities as media personnel.

The transmission of games on video equipment or demonstration boards with or without commentary could take place only from rooms located inside the playing hall. Press conferences took place in special rooms. All players were obliged to take part at the press-conference or give interviews for the official website upon request of the FIDE Press Officer, while all winners and medalists were obliged to attend the final press conference on the day after the event had ended and provide an exclusive interview for the FIDE website.

== Rounds ==
=== Round 1 ===
Wei vs. Sadiku

Position: a8 black rook, c8 black bishop, d8 black queen, e8 black king, g8 black knight, h8 black rook, e7 black bishop, f7 black pawn, g7 black pawn, h7 black pawn, a6 black pawn, c6 black knight, b5 black pawn, d5 black pawn, a4 white pawn, d4 white pawn, b3 white pawn, c3 black pawn, f3 white knight, c2 white pawn, d2 white knight, e2 white bishop, f2 white pawn, g2 white pawn, h2 white pawn, a1 white rook, c1 white bishop, d1 white queen, e1 white rook, g1 white king

After 10... c3?!, White left the knight on d2 in the lurch and played 11. axb5!.

The results in the first round generally reflected the huge rating disparities between the paired teams, the majority of the higher rated teams scoring perfect 4-0 results even without their top players. Several other top teams conceded a single draw, winning by 3½-½ margins. The world's top four players, Magnus Carlsen, Maxime Vachier-Lagrave, Fabiano Caruana and Vladimir Kramnik, all did not play in the opening round. Norway showed signs of frailty after conceding two draws against Wales to win 3–1, while Serbia beat Trinidad and Tobago by the same margin following GM Nikola Sedlak's upset loss to Kevin Cupid. The biggest surprise of the first round, however, was Bulgaria's draw against Sudan. Veselin Topalov and Krasimir Rusev won their games with the White pieces but Momchil Nikolov and Martin Petrov lost with the Black pieces. On the lower boards, the team from South Sudan impressed in their Olympiad debut against the Faeroe Islands, scoring an upset win on board 3 and a near-upset on board 1 despite a minimal budget, no coach, and little apparent knowledge of opening theory.

There was a larger than usual number of no-shows in the first round, particularly among the African teams. Several teams were unable to field the required three players and forfeited all four games; these were Malawi, Cameroon, Mali, Haiti, Sierra Leone, Liberia, Burundi, Senegal, Gambia, Congo, Djibouti, Lesotho and Mexico (who thereby lost to the much lower-rated Ivory Coast). Teams who had informed the organizers that their players had not arrived were not paired; these were Angola, Madagascar, Uganda, Kenya, Rwanda, Seychelles, Eritrea, and Central African Republic. A few teams arrived with only three players, gifting their opponents a point; Russia's fourth board Alexander Grischuk won in this fashion against Nigeria, as did Spain's David Antón Guijarro against Syria. Some of these teams later arrived, often with only three players; by the first rest day 10 teams had still not arrived, for a total participation of 170 teams.

One of the best games of the day was Wei Yi's win on board four to help China score a 4–0 victory against the first-time entrants Kosovo. In the game, he sacrificed a piece in the opening for an overwhelming compensation that enabled him to finish the game in 19 moves (see diagram).

=== Round 2 ===
Ali vs. Adams

Position: b7 white queen, h5 black pawn, h4 white pawn, e3 black pawn, g3 white pawn, e2 black queen, f2 black king, h2 white king

In this position, Adams played 137... Qd2? instead of the winning 137... Kf1+! followed by 138. Kh1 (138. Kh3 Kg1! 139. Qb1+ Qf1+ wins) Qf2! 139. Qb1+ Qe1 140. Qc2 e2 141. Qf5+ Qf2 142. Qb1+ e1N! (if Black promotes to other piece, White draws with 143. Qd3+ with perpetual check).

There was a number of stiff matches with closer fight and more balanced opposition in the second round, although top seeded teams continued scoring high victories. In general, all teams with higher average rating playing on the first 28 tables met their Elo expectations and defeated their opponents. Russia, Azerbaijan, Poland and India scored perfect victories against Turkmenistan, Macedonia, United Arab Emirates and Costa Rica, respectively. The United States and China dropped half point, because American Sam Shankland critically blundered in his game against the Scot Colin McNab but somehow managed to survive and Chinese Wei Yi played a game with many oscillations against Belgian Nicola Capone that seemed he might have lost but ended in a draw. England faced difficulties in narrowly beating Indonesia 2½-1½ after Luke McShane lost to Irwanto Sadikin and Michael Adams drew his 166-move game against Muhammad Lutfi Ali. The game could have been won for Adams had he spotted a nice combination including an underpromotion on move 137 (see diagram). The matches between Iran and Georgia, Slovakia and Greece, and Mongolia and Finland were all tied.

It was also the round in which the top four players on the FIDE rating list make their debut: Magnus Carlsen, Maxime Vachier-Lagrave, Fabiano Caruana and Vladimir Kramnik. Out of them, only Maxime Vachier-Lagrave was held to a draw to Irish grandmaster Alexander Baburin but France still managed to defeat Ireland convincingly by 3½-½. Carlsen opened his game with the move 1. e3!? but brought the game to a winning position with an overwhelming attack before any material was sacrificed and helped Norway beat Bangladesh minimally by 2½-1½. Caruana faced a Four Knights Game with 4. Be2, an opening that he has never seen before, but at the end still won the thrilling game against Andrew Greet of Scotland.

The issue with the incomplete pairing was handed down from the first to the second round and 14 African teams remained unpaired, meaning that the total number of teams actually playing was 166 instead of 180 as expected, which was 10 less than at the previous Chess Olympiad.

=== Round 3 ===
Mareco vs. Nakamura

Position: f7 black pawn, g7 black king, c6 white pawn, e6 black pawn, g6 black pawn, g5 white pawn, h5 black pawn, d4 white pawn, f4 white pawn, h4 white pawn, b3 black knight, d3 white rook, f3 white pawn, a2 black rook, b2 black rook, e2 white bishop, f2 white king, e1 white rook

White could have simplified this position to a winning endgame had he played 64. f5! with the idea of 64... gxf5 65. c7 Nc1 66. Rxc1 Rxe2+ 67. Kg3 Rg2+ 68. Kf4. Nonetheless, Mareco opted for a pawn push and played 64... c7? that led the game to be drawn.

The matches of the third round were closely contested by higher-rated teams with many of them having four grandmasters vs. four grandmasters boards. They resulted in a total of 16 teams extended their winning streak to three starting wins. Russia managed to set Moldova back from any surprise and scored a 3–1 win thanks to the wins by Ian Nepomniachtchi with the Black and Alexander Grischuk with the White pieces on the lower boards. Azerbaijan beat Hungary with the same score in a match with four decisive games, where Shakhriyar Mamedyarov, Rauf Mamedov and Arkadij Naiditsch defeated Richárd Rapport, Csaba Balogh and Benjamin Gledura, respectively and Zoltán Almási brought Hungary a full point for beating Teimour Radjabov.

United States and China both scored a 3–1 win against two South American teams, Argentina and Brazil. The American players earned success against Argentina with the White pieces as Fabiano Caruana defeated Fernando Peralta on board one and Wesley So defeated Federico Perez Ponsa on board three. Ray Robson played a move with the wrong rook to give Diego Flores a chance to play for a win but the position still looked holdable for Black and the game was drawn with a perpetual check. Hikaru Nakamura suffered in most of the game after Sandro Mareco outplayed him in the opening and brought the game to a winning position being two pawns up; however, on move 64, he missed a clearance idea to give his king more space that would have resulted in a win (see diagram). In contrast to the United States, the Chinese players won their match against Brazil as a result of two wins with the Black pieces and two draws. Wang Yue won a 114-move long game against Alexandr Fier, while Yu Yangyi escaped from a worse position against Evandro Amorim Barbosa and even won after the Brazilian blundered with his king on move 37 and resigned immediately.

The participants in the World Chess Championship 2016 Magnus Carlsen and Sergey Karjakin were both held to a draw. Unlike Karjakin whose team would have won had he even lost his game, Carlsen did not save his team who lost to Romania 2½-1½ as Aryan Tari was beaten by Bogdan-Daniel Deac. The World Champion was pressing in his game as Black against Constantin Lupulescu and got a slight edge, which he was unable to convert to a win and the game ended in a draw. Besides Norway, other strong teams that lost minimally were Germany to Ukraine and Poland to Cuba. Only one decisive game brought Ukraine the win, in which Andrei Volokitin won as White against German Daniel Fridman on board four. Cuba's win over Poland was decided on the boards three and four, where Yuniesky Quezada and Isan Reynaldo Ortiz Suárez beat Mateusz Bartel and Dariusz Świercz, respectively; the only full point for Poland came from board two, where 18-year old Jan-Krzysztof Duda defeated Lázaro Bruzón to keep his perfect score with 3 out of 3 at the Olympiad. Canada's strong start with 8 out of 8 games won in the first two rounds ended with a 2½-1½ loss against England. Michael Adams and Gawain Jones won their games as White, while David Howell lost and Nigel Short successfully defended a worse position throughout much of the game.

=== Round 4 ===
Tomashevsky vs. Ponomariov

Position: a8 black rook, d8 black queen, c7 black pawn, d7 black knight, e7 black bishop, f7 black pawn, g7 black king, h7 black rook, b6 black pawn, d6 black pawn, g6 black pawn, a5 black pawn, d5 white pawn, e5 black pawn, h5 black pawn, c4 white pawn, e4 white pawn, g4 white pawn, h4 white pawn, c3 white knight, a2 white pawn, b2 white pawn, e2 white queen, h2 white rook, b1 white king, f1 white knight, h1 white rook

Tomashevsky blundered a pawn in this position with 33. Rh3??, which was followed by 33... hxg4 34. fxg4 Rxh4 35. Rxh4 Bxh4. Ponomariov managed to convert the advantage and thus to decide the match.

The fourth round was marked by the encounter between the six-time Olympic champions Russia and two-time Olympic champions Ukraine on the first table. Russia approached the match without Sergey Karjakin, who played for Ukraine in three Olympiads in the past and won a gold medal with the team in 2006, while Ukraine did not have Yuriy Kryvoruchko in the line-up. The match started well for the Russians as Ian Nepomniachtchi succeeded to convert his slight edge into a winning position against Anton Korobov by spotting a mating net around the opponent's king to win his game with the Black pieces. Nevertheless, the result was not standing for long, because Andrei Volokitin defeated Alexander Grischuk, who spent more than an hour on moves 10–12, in a rook endgame with three strong connected pawns on the e-g files. On the other two boards, it seemed that only Pavel Eljanov had some winning chances against Vladimir Kramnik on the top board but Ruslan Ponomariov won a pawn against Evgeny Tomashevsky and converted the advantage into a full point. After Tomashevsky resigned and the Ukrainian team took the lead, Eljanov gave up from putting pressure on Kramnik and agreed to a draw. Ukraine narrowly won the match 2½-1½. Following the end of the match, Ukrainian president Petro Poroshenko spent no time to hail the victory on his Twitter account.

The second seeded team of the United States were held to a 2–2 tie by the Czech Republic in a match with four draws. Azerbaijan and China both scored a 3–1 win against Romania and Italy, respectively to continue their winning run. Azerbaijan's victory came as a result of Shakhriyar Mamedyarov's crushing win over Constantin Lupulescu with the Black pieces on the top board and Arkadij Naiditsch's strong performance against Vlad-Cristian Jianu with the White pieces on board four. The Chinese had two decisive games in their favour on the first two boards as Wang Yue beat Danyyil Dvirnyy in a superb positional display to secure his third win against a grandmaster in three games and Ding Liren defeated Axel Rombaldoni. The second table hosted the battle between the strong Indian and Cuban teams, which resulted in a tight victory for India with three draws and a single win scored by 21-year old Vidit Santosh Gujrathi over Yuniesky Quezada, who recorded his fourth win in the fourth game. The clash between 6th seeds England against 11th seeds the Netherlands was also one of the interesting pairings of the day but ended in a surprisingly 3½-½ win for the Dutch team. England, who were playing without Nigel Short, scored only one draw on the top board in the game between Michael Adams and Anish Giri. On the other boards, Erwin l'Ami, Loek van Wely and Benjamin Bok all defeated David Howell, Luke McShane and Gawain Jones, respectively. In the other interesting matches, Belarus narrowly beat Latvia thanks to Sergei Zhigalko's win against Alexei Shirov on board one, Serbia and Slovenia played a tied match, while Croatia were surprisingly beaten by lower-rated Mongolia as former European champion Zdenko Kožul lost as White to Tsegmed Batchuluun.

World champion Magnus Carlsen drew Australia's David Smerdon but his team snatched a minimal win against Australia, because Frode Urkedal beat Max Illingworth on the lowest board. The winless day for the strong players was completed with Maxime Vachier-Lagrave who played a game that he could not win against Ioannis Papaioannou in the 2–2 draw with Greece, while Veselin Topalov was beaten by Baadur Jobava in Bulgaria's 3–1 loss to Georgia.

=== Round 5 ===
Nguyễn vs. Jones

Position: a8 black rook, c8 black bishop, e8 black queen, f8 black rook, g8 black king, a7 black pawn, b7 black pawn, g7 black bishop, h7 black pawn, a6 black knight, d6 white knight, g6 black pawn, d5 white pawn, e5 black pawn, h5 black knight, b4 white pawn, e4 white pawn, f4 black pawn, a3 white pawn, e3 white bishop, h3 white pawn, d2 white knight, f2 white pawn, g2 white pawn, a1 white rook, d1 white queen, e1 white king, f1 white bishop, h1 white rook

In this position, Jones made a positional queen sacrifice by playing 15... fxe3!?, managing to get a strong attack. The game continued with 16. Nxe8 exf2+ 17. Ke2 Ng3+ 18. Kd3 Rxe8 19. Kc2 Bd7 20. Bc4 Ba4+ 21. Bb3 Bb5 and Black won after 32 moves.

Three teams, the Netherlands, Ukraine and India, continued their victorious runs and scored their fifth match win. After closely defeating the first seeds Russia in the previous round, Ukraine beat another strong opponent in the name of the reigning Olympic champions China by 2½-1½. The only decisive game in the match was Yuriy Kryvoruchko's win with the White pieces against Yu Yangyi on the third board. The Netherlands had also a close encounter with Belarus with only one decisive game in favour of the Dutch team. The game was played between Kirill Stupak and Benjamin Bok on the fourth board. Black was better out of the opening, which mostly accounted for the unsafe position of the White king, and even sacrificed a rook for a direct attack. The game turned around at some point as Black did not succeed to properly coordinate his pieces in the attack and White appeared to be winning. Nonetheless, White committed himself to a series of mistakes that left Black with a very powerful attack despite being a rook down that resulted in a Black's win. It was Bok's fourth win in the fourth game he played. India continued their winning streak after stunning the hosts Azerbaijan 3-1 thanks to two wins with the Black pieces. Pentala Harikrishna beat Shakhriyar Mamedyarov and Vidit Santosh Gujrathi defeated Arkadij Naiditsch to score his fifth win at the Olympiad.

Russia recovered after their loss to Ukraine in the previous round to beat Egypt 3-1 and so did England who beat Vietnam with the same result after the heavy loss to the Netherlands. Sergey Karjakin and Ian Nepomniachtchi both won for Russia with the White pieces on board one and board three, respectively, while Gawain Jones and Nigel Short scored full points on the lower boards for England. Especially remarkable was Gawain Jones' win over Nguyễn Ahn Khoi with a positional queen sacrifice on move 15 for two minor pieces and the attack (see diagram). United States beat Serbia 3-1 thanks to the early wins by Hikaru Nakamura and Wesley So. Georgia extended their winning run with a crushing win 3½-½ against Spain, where only José Carlos Ibarra Jerez was able to hold Tornike Sanikidze to a draw. The upsets of the day were Cuba, Hungary and France who lost to lower-rated Canada, Latvia and Paraguay, respectively. Cuba's Leinier Domínguez won against Canada's Evgeny Bareev on board one but his teammates lost on all other boards. Latvia scored two wins against Hungary on the first two boards, where Alexei Shirov beat Richárd Rapport as White and Igor Kovalenko defeated Ferenc Berkes; Csaba Balogh's win against Vladimir Sveshnikov on board four was enough just for minimal loss for his team. France's Maxime Vachier-Lagrave scored his first win at the Olympiad after three draws but his team suffered a 2½-1½ loss from Paraguay as Sébastien Mazé and Romain Édouard both lost.

Jan-Krzysztof Duda of Poland scored an impressive win against Moldova's Viorel Iordăchescu to join grandmasters Vidit Santosh Gujrathi, Hjorvar Steinn Grétarsson and Ian Nepomniachtchi as only players scoring 5 out of 5 in the first five rounds. In a game that was opened with the Berlin Defence of the Ruy Lopez with Steinitz's 4. d3, Duda came with an original idea on the move 11, which allowed him to develop a strong play with his rooks on the c-file and later sacrifice an exchange on c6 to get a winning position. Despite his win, the match ended in a tie.

=== Round 6 ===
l'Ami vs. Adhiban

Position: g8 black king, e7 black rook, f7 black pawn, g7 white pawn, a6 black bishop, d6 black rook, h6 black pawn, c5 black pawn, d5 white bishop, a4 black pawn, c4 white pawn, a3 white pawn, c3 white bishop, b2 white pawn, g2 white pawn, h2 white pawn, c1 white rook, g1 white king

l'Ami blundered in this position with 36. Rd1??, overlooking the pin of the bishop and dropping the important pawn on c4. Adhiban immediately grabbed the pawn on c4 and forced the exchange of rooks with 36... Bxc4 37. Bf3 Rxd1+ 38. Bxd1. l'Ami resigned after 66 moves.

The central match in the sixth round receiving the attention was the clash between India and the Netherlands. The Dutch players started strong on all boards, especially Anish Giri who put Pentala Harikrishna in serious trouble on the first board, but the Indians defended well. After three draws, the only decisive game was played on the second board, where Baskaran Adhiban beat Erwin l'Ami with the Black pieces after the Dutch blundered an important pawn on the move 36 and put himself in a lost endgame (see diagram). Ukraine, who were the third team with a perfect score before the round, lost 2½-1½ to the United States, which allowed India to become sole leader and the only team with perfect match score after six rounds. Similarly to the match between India and the Netherlands, there was only one decisive game played on the first board, where Fabiano Caruana silently outplayed Pavel Eljanov in a position that seemed equal but later transposed into a winning endgame with a passed a-pawn. Caruana said that he was not better at all and that 19... Rf6 was step in the wrong direction for Black, followed with the weird 29... Rxe6. He also added that it was "by far" the biggest win he had ever had for the United States.

Czech Republic and Georgia split the points with four draws. Azerbaijan and Greece also played a match that ended 2-2 but with one decisive game per side. Shakhriyar Mamedyarov and Teimour Radjabov drew their games on the top two boards against Dimitrios Mastrovasilis and Hristos Banikas, respectively. Arkadij Naiditsch had a good start of the tournament with four wins but suffered his second loss in a row in the game against Athanasios Mastrovasilis after losing track of the complications that occurred in an old line of the Benoni Defence. However, Eltaj Safarli saved the day for the Azeri team with his win over Stelios Halkias. On the other boards, Canada continued with their strong performance by beating Belarus 2½-1½ as a result of the Eric Hansen's win against Andrey Zhigalko on board three; China edged out Argentina with the same result thanks to Ding Liren and Li Chao who scored full points against Federico Perez Ponsa and Diego Flores, respectively, but Wang Yue lost to Sandro Mareco with the White pieces on board one; Norway tied with the Philippines in a match resulting in four draws, where Julio Catalino Sadorra held World champion Magnus Carlsen to a draw. Carlsen got a small edge out of the opening but did not manage to cash in from it and put himself in an inferior position with a pawn down that he was still able to hold. After the game, Sadorra commented:

It was only time trouble that kept me from converting the advantage… It's me against me. The only reason I will lose or not find good moves is me.

Russia defeated Germany 3–1 with two wins with the White pieces on boards two and four, where Vladimir Kramnik beat Georg Meier and Ian Nepomniachtchi beat Daniel Fridman. Meier opened the game with the French Defence but Kramnik sacrificed a piece for two pawns and a strong initiative right out of the opening that resulted in a winning endgame with a pawn up. Fridman opted for the Petrov's Defence in his game against Nepomniachtchi and played well until the time control but then he went for a passive set-up with his pieces and allowed the Russian to win the endgame. It was Nepomniachtchi's sixth win at the tournament, making him the only player with perfect score after six rounds.

=== Round 7 ===
Karjakn vs. Navara

Position: a8 black rook, d8 black queen, g8 black king, a7 black bishop, b7 black pawn, c7 black pawn, f7 black pawn, g7 black pawn, a6 black pawn, c6 black knight, d6 black pawn, e6 black rook, f6 black knight, h6 black pawn, e5 black pawn, a4 white pawn, b4 white pawn, e4 white pawn, c3 white pawn, d3 white pawn, f3 white knight, h3 white pawn, c2 white queen, d2 white knight, f2 white pawn, g2 white pawn, a1 white rook, c1 white bishop, e1 white rook, g1 white king

Navara played a novelty in this position with 13... d5?!, weakening the square c5 and allowing Karjakin to exchange the dark-squared bishops and occupy the square with a knight. The game was followed by 14. Nb3 b5 15. Be3 Bxe3 16. Rxe3 Rd6 17. Nc5 with lasting advantage for White.

The seventh round was marked with the high 3½-½ victories of the top two seeds Russia and the United States against the Czech Republic and India, the only team with a perfect score and the sole leader in the standings, respectively. The three wins for the American team came from the games played from the second to the fourth board, where Hikaru Nakamura beat Baskaran Adhiban, Wesley So defeated Vidit Santosh Gujrathi and Sam Shankland beat S. P. Sethuraman; the game on the first board between Pentala Harikrishna and Fabiano Caruana was drawn. However, it did not seem to be a one-sided match as the final result may indicate, because the Indian players even had chances to win the games on the first and the fourth board. Caruana had a worse position during most of the game and seemed to be in trouble but Harikrishna mistakenly offered a queen exchange on move 35 that blew out his advantage. Shankland was in a desperate position against Sethuraman but the Indian was not able to finish the game and started making mistakes in the time trouble to lose his huge advantage and end up in an inferior position being two pawns down that resulted in a loss. Shankland said after the game that he was considering to resign but played on, because it was a team event with more on the line than just a personal result. He added that he had saved games with that bad position in the past but not against someone of Sethuraman's strength.

Russia snatched the high victory thanks to the wins on the first three boards, where Sergey Karjakin, Evgeny Tomashevsky and Ian Nepomniachtchi beat David Navara, Viktor Láznička and Zbyněk Hráček, respectively; on the lowest board, Vlastimil Babula drew with Alexander Grischuk. Navara went with a novelty right out of the opening that weakened his position and allowed Karjakin to find a strong outpost for his knight on c5 (see diagram). The game was over after 24 moves as the Czech committed himself to several blunders in the already worse position. In an interview after the game, Karjakin stated that he felt "honoured" to play on the first board "in such a great team". Nepomniachtchi continued the perfect score with his seventh win in a game with opposite-coloured bishops. The position seemed equal but Nepomniachtchi manoeuvred around putting pressure on his opponent, who made mistakes that allowed the Russian to get a winning advantage.

On the second table, Latvia upset the higher-rated Netherlands with a 3–1 win resulting from the games with the Black pieces, in which Igor Kovalenko beat Loek van Wely and Nikita Meskovs beat Benjamin Bok. The match between Azerbaijan and Croatia ended in a 3½-½ victory for the host team with full points scored by Teimour Radjabov, Rauf Mamedov and Eltaj Safarli. Georgia beat Romania 3–1 with the wins by Baadur Jobava, who scored his fourth win in six games on board one, and Levan Pantsulaia with the White pieces. England defeated China 3-1 as well thanks to the wins by Michael Adams, who squeezed out a win from a seemingly equal position against Wang Yue as White on the top board and Nigel Short, who won the sharp battle with double-edged positions against Li Chao as Black on the lowest board. Canada provided strong resistance against Ukraine with Evgeny Bareev's win over Pavel Eljanov with the Black pieces on the top board; however, Anton Korobov and Andrei Volokitin won on the lower boards to earn Ukraine a minimal match victory. Norway also won with a minimal result against Turkey thanks to the World champion Magnus Carlsen, who checkmated Dragan Šolak as Black on the top board.

=== Round 8 ===
Jobava vs. Ponomariov

Position: a8 black rook, c8 black rook, g8 black king, e7 white rook, f7 black pawn, g7 black pawn, h7 black pawn, a6 black pawn, b6 black queen, e6 black bishop, f6 black knight, a5 black knight, b5 black pawn, d5 black pawn, f5 black pawn, d4 white pawn, f4 white bishop, a3 white pawn, c3 white knight, d3 white bishop, h3 white pawn, b2 white pawn, c2 white pawn, d2 white queen, f2 white pawn, g2 white pawn, d1 white rook, g1 white king

In this position, where it seems that the White rook on e7 is trapped, Jobava found a brilliant idea with 17. Bh6!! and a strong attack to follow. The game continued with 17... gxh6 18. Qxh6 Rxc3 19. Qg5+ Kf8 20. Qxf6 Rxd3 21. cxd3 and Ponomariov resigned.

The attention in the eighth round was centred on the match between the top two seeds and tournament leaders after seven rounds Russia and the United States that ended 2–2. After about an hour of play, it was clear that the game between Hikaru Nakamura and Vladimir Kramnik on the second board was heading to a draw as Nakamura did not manage to get an opening advantage in a game with a solid Queen's Gambit Declined for Black. Kramnik, however, continued playing in a drawn position until the draw was agreed after 42 moves. The clash between Sergey Karjakin and Fabiano Caruana was more interesting, because Karjakin put some pressure on his opponent but was not able to find a clear win. The decisive games were played on the lower boards. On board four, Alexander Grischuk managed to score a full point with the Black pieces against Ray Robson after the American played too passively in the time trouble, making a miscalculation on move 38 when he decided to liquidate the opponent's knight and allowed Grischuk to get a winning position with a passed e-pawn. It was the first individual loss for the United States at the Olympiad. On board three, Wesley So obtained a nearly decisive advantage with the Black pieces in the opening, which he later converted into a win against Ian Nepomniachtchi who had won all seven games previously played at the Olympiad.

On the second table, Ukraine beat Georgia 3-1 thanks to the wins from the second to the fourth board, where Yuriy Kryvoruchko, Anton Korobov and Andrei Volokitin defeated Mikheil Mchedlishvili, Levan Pantsulaia and Tamaz Gelashvili, respectively. Nevertheless, Baadur Jobava scored full point for Georgia with his fifth victory in the seventh game against Ruslan Ponomariov. The Ukrainian tried a new idea and was doing fine out of the opening but one sloppy allowed Jobava to grab the initiative that turned into a brilliant attack with a bishop sacrifice (see diagram). After the game, Jobava declined a press conference, saying that his moves were better than his thoughts. India edged out England 2½-1½ thanks to S. P. Sethuraman's win over Nigel Short on the fourth board in the only decisive game of the match. Both Ukraine and India joined the United States on the top of the standings. The highest rated host team Azerbaijan snatched a 2½-1½ victory in their match against Latvia with Eltaj Safarli beating Nikita Meskovs on the last board. China suffered their third loss at the tournament after losing minimally to Hungary with Zoltán Almási's win over Li Chao with the Black pieces. Norway continued their steady rise with a 3–1 victory against Peru as a result of the three wins scored by Magnus Carlsen, Aryan Tari and Frode Urkedal.

Several matches on the higher tables were drawn, including Italy versus Iran, Greece versus Slovenia and Canada versus Vietnam. With four wins and four draws, Greece remained the only unbeaten team other than the United States after eight rounds.

=== Round 9 ===
Jones vs. Firouzja

Position: d8 black rook, g8 black king, f7 black pawn, g7 black pawn, h7 black pawn, a6 black pawn, f6 black bishop, d5 black pawn, e5 black knight, f5 white rook, d4 white knight, b3 white pawn, e3 white bishop, g3 white pawn, h3 white pawn, a2 white pawn, c2 white rook, f2 white pawn, g2 white king, d1 black rook

This is the position after Firouzja played 26... Rd1, not paying attention to a possible back-rank mate, which allowed Jones to exchange rook for two minor pieces after 27. Rxe5 Bxe5 28. Nc6 Re8 29. Nxe5 with advantage he was able to convert.

The ninth round concluded with the United States and Ukraine on the top of the standings as a result of their match victories against Norway and India. The United States beat Norway 3–1 in a match with two draws and two wins with the Black pieces. On the top board, the match hosted the encounter between Magnus Carlsen and Fabiano Caruana in which the World champion surprised his opponent by opening the game with the Scandinavian Defence. Caruana said after the game that he hardly remembered the theory beyond the opening, in which Carlsen even played a novelty on move 8. He managed to comfortably equalise the position and the game ended in a draw. On the second board, Jon Ludvig Hammer got into an unpleasant position against Hikaru Nakamura that the American converted into a full point. After the game, Nakamura explained that his opponent had probably mixed up the variants and that he should have not allowed exchange of the light-square bishops. The game between Frode Urkedal and Sam Shankland on the lowest board did also end in favour of the American team after Urkedal made some strange moves in a Sicilian Najdorf that allowed his opponent to snatch the win. Shankland said that he noticed his opponent had only played 1. e4 seven times in his life and was not ready to handle the complexities of the Najdorf position that arose. Ukraine won the battle with India by 2½-1½ with the only decisive game played on the last board. The game between S. P. Sethuraman and Anton Korobov was still being played after all games on the first three boards had ended in a draw. The game opened with a Rauzer Sicilian that lead to a difficult endgame with advantage for Korobov who was able to convert it with the Black pieces. He said that he was unable to properly evaluate the position but after the time control he realised he was close to winning.

On the other tables, Russia defeated the strongest team of the host Azerbaijan by 3-1 thanks to the wins by Vladimir Kramnik and Alexander Grischuk both with the White pieces over Teimour Radjabov and Arkadij Naiditsch, respectively. The game between Shakhriyar Mamedyarov and Sergey Karjakin was also interesting but the Russian succeeded to hold the game. Iran and England tied their match with two decisive games played on the lower boards, where Shahin Lorparizangeneh beat Luke McShane for Iran and Gawain Jones defeated Alireza Firouzja for England. On the fourth board, 13-year old untitled Firouzja missed a decisive tactic on move 26 that allowed Jones to win the game (see diagram). Czech Republic minimally defeated the Netherlands 2½-1½ with the only win scored by Viktor Láznička against Erwin l'Ami and so did Georgia who beat Hungary with the same score as a result of the wins on the first two boards by Baadur Jobava and Mikheil Mchedlishvili. Jobava reached a result 7 out of 8 with a performance rating of 3013, second highest at the Olympiad after Capo Vidal Uriel's of Mexico. The matches Latvia versus Slovenia, Italy versus Chile and Greece versus Turkey all ended with even scores.

=== Round 10 ===
Shankland vs. Sanikidze

Position: a8 black rook, d8 black queen, e8 black rook, g8 black king, a7 black pawn, f7 black pawn, g7 black pawn, b6 black pawn, c6 black knight, f6 black knight, d5 black pawn, h5 black pawn, c4 black pawn, d4 white pawn, a3 white pawn, c3 white pawn, e3 white pawn, f3 white pawn, g3 white knight, b2 white bishop, e2 white queen, g2 white pawn, h2 white pawn, a1 white rook, f1 white rook, g1 white king

In this position, Shankland played a novelty with 16. Qf2! that helped him consolidate in the game and win the Black h-pawn after 16... Qd7 17. Rae1 Ne7 18. e4 h4 19. Nh1 Ng6 20. e5 Nh5 21. Bc1 Nhf4 22. Bxf4 Nxf4 23. Qxh4. Sanikidze resigned on move 39.

The matches of the penultimate round saw the United States and Ukraine winning to reach the final round tied for the first place with 18 match points each. The United States beat Georgia 2½-1½ thanks to the wins scored by Wesley So and Sam Shankland on the lower boards. Sam Shankland was the first to score a full point after beating Tornike Sanikidze with the White pieces in a game in which he played a novelty on move 16 that allowed him to quickly win a pawn and get rid of his bad bishop at the same time (see diagram). Wesley So won with the Black pieces against Levan Pantsulaia in a game that he equalised and managed to get an advantage after Pantsulaia blundered a pawn on move 14. After the game, So said that his opponent lost on time but in a lost position. On board two, however, Hikaru Nakamura lost with the White pieces to Mikheil Mchedlishvili as a result of a bad move played in the opening that did not give him a chance to bounce back into the game. On the second table, Ukraine defeated the Czech Republic 3–1 with two wins on the first and the last board, where Pavel Eljanov beat David Navara as Black to reach an individual score of 50% and Andrei Volokitin defeated Vlastimil Babula as White for an individual score of 7½ out of 8 with a performance rating of 2994.

Russia had just one match point deficit to the leaders before the round and still had hopes for stealing the gold in the last minute but their hopes were dashed in the match against India that ended in a 2–2 tie. The Russian team were even trailing after the World Champion Challenger Sergey Karjakin lost to Pentala Harikrishna on the top board. Yet, Vladimir Kramnik beat Baskaran Adhiban in a King's Indian Attack, where the Indian was playing anti-positionally in the opening. He put all his pawns on light squares and traded his bishop on h5 for a knight on f3 on move 11 but switched on the colour controlled by his remaining bishop after the position opened up. Kramnik knew how to deal with it and converted his advantage to a win. England narrowly beat Azerbaijan 2½-1½ with wins by Gawain Jones and Nigel Short against Arkadij Naiditsch and Eltaj Safarli, respectively; Rauf Mamedov defeated David Howell to score the only full point for the Azeri team, while Michael Adams and Shakhriyar Mamedyarov drew their game. Norway won with a huge margin against Iran 3½-½ with three wins by Magnus Carlsen, Aryan Tari and Frode Urkedal. Hungary minimally defeated the Netherlands 2½-1½ with only one decisive game played on board three, where Csaba Balogh beat Loek van Wely with the White pieces in a game that lasted 113 moves. Canada continued their strong performance with a 3–1 victory over Latvia. Alexei Shirov beat Evgeny Bareev on the first board for Latvia but Anton Kovalyov, Alexandre Lesiège and Eric Hansen all won on the lower boards to secure the match victory for their team.

Besides Russia versus India, other matches on the higher tables that ended in a tie were China versus Belarus and Greece versus Spain. The defending Olympic champions disappointed once again as Li Chao suffered his third consecutive loss at the Olympiad. Spain was ahead of Greece thanks to Francisco Vallejo Pons who beat Ioannis Papaioannou on the top board but the Greek team struck back with the win scored by Stelios Halkias against Renier Vázquez on the lowest board. Thus, Greece remained the only unbeaten team along with the United States before the final round.

=== Round 11 ===
Urkedal vs. Sethuraman

Position: a8 black rook, d8 black queen, e8 black rook, g8 black king, a7 black pawn, b7 black pawn, f7 black pawn, g7 black pawn, h7 black pawn, b6 black bishop, e6 black bishop, f6 black knight, d5 black pawn, a4 white knight, f4 white pawn, b3 white pawn, d3 white queen, e3 white pawn, a2 white pawn, b2 white bishop, e2 white bishop, g2 white pawn, h2 white pawn, a1 white rook, f1 white rook, g1 white king

Sethuraman blundered a piece in this position by playing 16... Bxe3+??, overlooking that after 17. Qxe3 Bg4 he does not win the piece back because of 18. Be5. The Indian resigned on move 25.

Two teams, United States and Ukraine, entered the final round tied for the first place with 18 match points, while Russia was in third place with 16 match points. The United States narrowly defeated Canada 2½-1½, with Fabiano Caruana and Wesley So, both as White, beating Evgeny Bareev and Alexandre Lesiège on board one and three, respectively; Anton Kovalyov and Hikaru Nakamura drew their game on the second board, while Eric Hansen scored a full point for Canada against Sam Shankland on the lowest board. Caruana outplayed Bareev in the quickest game of the match, while Nakamura managed to defend a slightly worse endgame against Kovalyov. On the third board, So sacrificed an exchange in his game against Lesiège with all three results being realistic at some point, but the game ended with a full point for the American team, while Hansen beat Shankland in a game in which the American did not get anything from his theoretical pawn sacrifice on the last board. Ukraine also won their final match with a convincing 3½-½ victory over Slovenia thanks to the wins by Pavel Eljanov, Anton Korobov and Andrei Volokitin against Alexander Beliavsky, Jure Borišek and Matej Šebenik, respectively. Russia defeated Italy 3-1 thanks to victories scored by Vladimir Kramnik and Alexander Grischuk.

In the other matches of the final round, Norway and India exchanged one win each for a 2–2 tie. The match score was decided on the lower boards, as the games between Pentala Harikrishna and Magnus Carlsen on the first board and Jon Ludvig Hammer and Baskaran Adhiban on the second board were drawn. Frode Urkedal scored the first win in the match after S. P. Sethuraman blundered a piece, overlooking a simple response by his opponent (see diagram). Vidit Santosh Gujrathi, however, equalised the result after defeating Aryan Tari. Azerbaijan and France scored 3-1 victories against Turkmenistan and the Czech Republic, respectively, while Turkey minimally beat Georgia 2½-1½. The match between Peru and England and the match between Greece and Hungary both ended in ties. Greece remained the only unbeaten team at the tournament along with the United States, scoring four wins and seven draws.

== Final standings ==
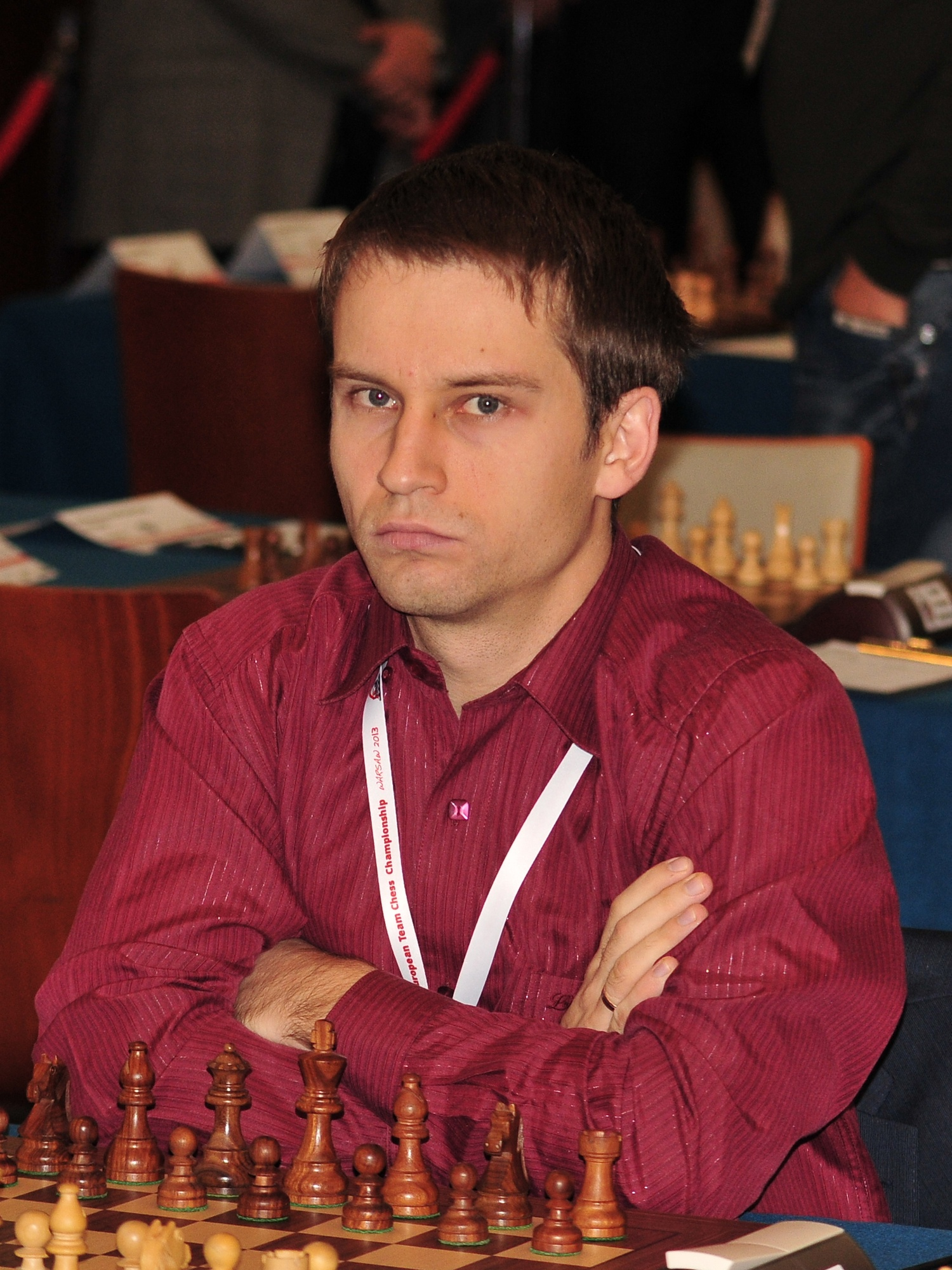
Andrei Volokitin of Ukraine was the best individual player in the open event.

The United States won the gold medal in the open event for the first time since 1976 and the sixth time overall. They scored nine wins and two draws for a total of 20 match points, and thereby finished as one of only two teams that remained unbeaten in the open event (the other being Greece). Ukraine scored 20 match points (ten wins and one loss) as well but lost the tie-breaker to secure the silver medal. Russia, favourites before the tournament, finished in third place with 18 match points. China, the defending champions, scored 15 match points, and occupied the 13th place in the final standings. Norway, led by the World champion Magnus Carlsen, ended the tournament in fifth place, which is their best result ever at the Chess Olympiads; they had only finished in the top 20 on one previous occasion. Teams that had a disappointing result other than China include Azerbaijan (the fourth seed) in 12th place, Spain in 31st place, the Netherlands in 36th place, and Germany in 37th place.

Andrei Volokitin of Ukraine, playing as a reserve player, won the individual gold medal overall scoring 8½ out of 9 (eight wins and a draw) with a performance rating of 2992. The other gold medalists include Baadur Jobava of Georgia on board one with a total score 8 out of 10 and a performance rating of 2926, Vladimir Kramnik of Russia on board two who scored 6½ out of 8 with a performance rating of 2903, Wesley So of the United States on board three with 8½ out of 10 and a performance rating of 2896, and Laurent Fressinet of France who scored 7 out of 8 with a performance rating of 2809. However, the best scorer at the tournament was 64-year old Eugenio Torre who played in a record 23rd Olympiad and scored 10 out of 11 with a performance rating of 2836 and the bronze medal on board three. Peter Svidler called his achievement "frankly beyond belief" and said of him:

I wanted to speak a little about people who impressed the most, and somehow I kept on ignoring his performances in my previous two banters during this Olympiad, which is ridiculous, but I think pride of place goes to Eugenio Torre. You probably know who he is, and you probably have read about his results by now, but what he achieved during this Olympiad is absolutely tremendous. He is by no means a young man by now and he… played a tremendous level of opposition. The Philippines are a decently strong team and they played very, very decent opposition almost throughout the tournament. The result Eugenio showed in this event is absolutely fantastic.

=== Team standings ===
#	Country	Players	Average rating	MP	dSB
1	United States	Caruana, Nakamura, So, Shankland, Robson	2765	20	413.5
2	Ukraine	Eljanov, Ponomariov, Kryvoruchko, Korobov, Volokitin	2704	20	404.5
3	Russia	Karjakin, Kramnik, Tomashevsky, Nepomniachtchi, Grischuk	2768	18	
4	India	Harikrishna, Adhiban, Gujrathi, Sethuraman, Karthikeyan	2683	16	350.5
5	Norway	Carlsen, Hammer, Tari, Urkedal, Getz	2654	16	344.5
6	Turkey	Šolak, Ipatov, Yılmaz, Can, Esen	2617	16	341.5
7	Poland	Wojtaszek, Duda, Bartel, Piorun, Świercz	2685	16	331.0
8	France	Vachier-Lagrave, Mazé, Édouard, Fressinet, Bauer	2684	16	326.5
9	England	Adams, Howell, McShane, Jones, Short	2685	16	323.0
10	Peru	Cordova, Cori, Vera Siguenas, Cruz, Fernández	2566	16	306.0

Notes

- Average ratings calculated by chess-results.com based in September 2016 ratings.

=== Board standings ===
All board prizes were given out according to performance ratings for players who have played at least eight games at the tournament. Andrei Volokitin as a reserve player had the best performance of all players in the tournament:

- Board 1: (Georgia (country)) Baadur Jobava 2926
- Board 2: (Russia) Vladimir Kramnik 2903
- Board 3: (United States) Wesley So 2896
- Board 4: (France) Laurent Fressinet 2809
- Reserve: (Ukraine) Andrei Volokitin 2992

Board 1

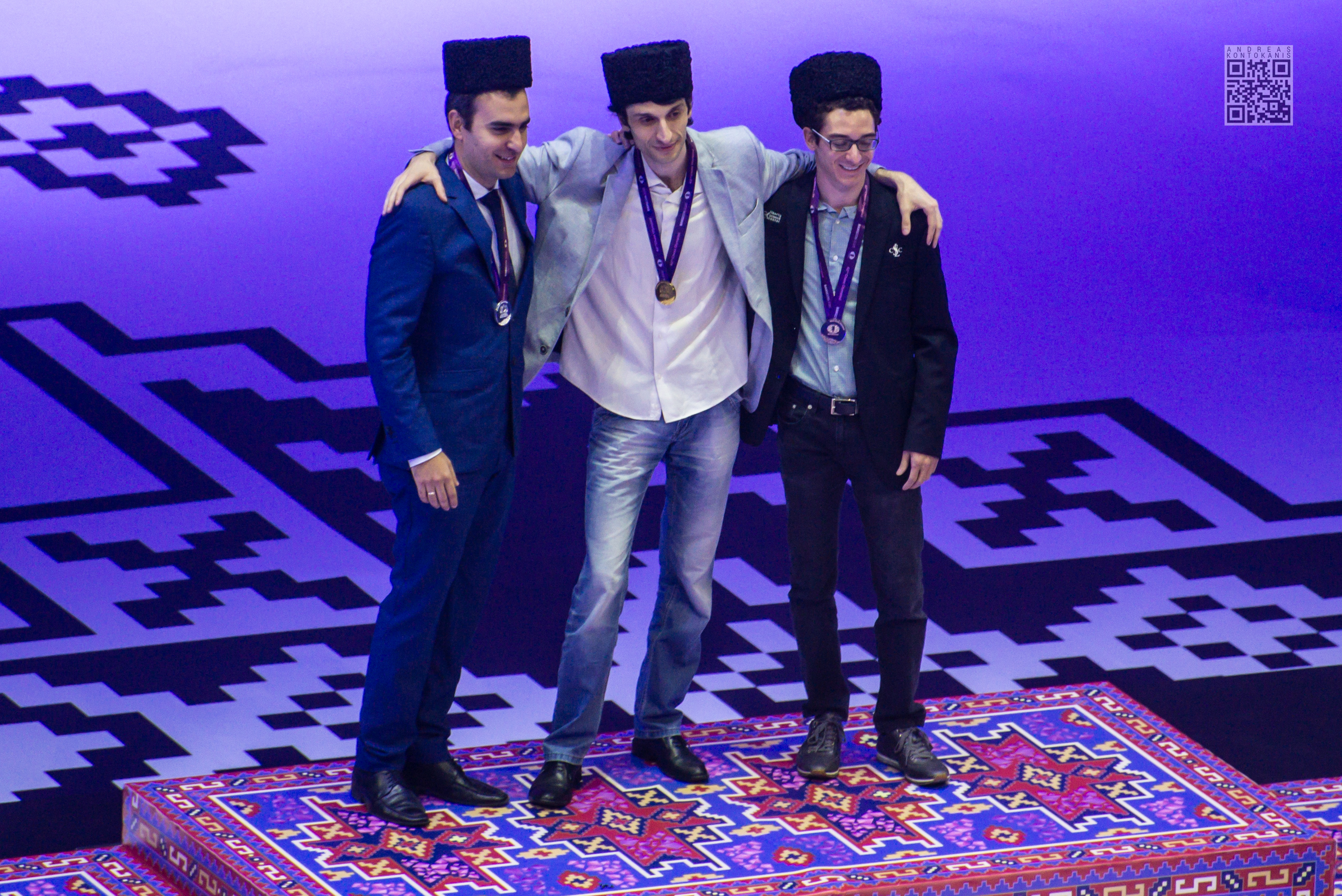
Leinier Domínguez (left), Baadur Jobava (middle) and Fabiano Caruana (right) on the podium of Board 1 medalists

#	Player	Points	Games	Performance rating
1	(Georgia (country)) Baadur Jobava	8	10	2926
2	(Cuba) Leinier Domínguez	7½	10	2839
3	(United States) Fabiano Caruana	7	10	2838

Board 2

#	Player	Points	Games	Performance rating
1	(Russia) Vladimir Kramnik	6½	8	2903
2	(Canada) Anton Kovalyov	8	10	2852
3	(Peru) Jorge Cori	8	10	2810

Board 3

#	Player	Points	Games	Performance rating
1	(United States) Wesley So	8½	10	2896
2	(Hungary) Zoltán Almási	7½	9	2845
3	(Philippines) Eugenio Torre	10	11	2836

Board 4

#	Player	Points	Games	Performance rating
1	(France) Laurent Fressinet	7	8	2809
2	(Russia) Ian Nepomniachtchi	8	10	2804
3	(Serbia) Aleksandar Indjic	8½	10	2786

Reserve

#	Player	Points	Games	Performance rating
1	(Ukraine) Andrei Volokitin	8½	9	2992
2	(Jordan) Sami Khader	8	8	2932
3	(Belarus) Aleksej Aleksandrov	6½	8	2760

=== Grandmaster norms ===
Grandmaster norms were achieved by Yusup Atabayev (Turkmenistan), Nicola Capone (Belgium), Bogdan-Danil Deac (Romania), Marian Jurcik (Slovakia), Shahin Lorparizangeneh (Iran), Parham Maghsoodloo (Iran), Luca Moroni (Italy), Anton Smirnov (Australia, double GM norm) and Helgi Dam Ziska (Faeroe Islands).

== See also ==
- Women's event at the 42nd Chess Olympiad

== Bibliography ==
- Agaragimov, Djakhangir (2016). Pearls of Azerbaijan. Baku: Baku Chess Olympiad Operating Committee. ISBN 9788394429089.
