= Veloz =

Veloz may refer to:

== People with the surname ==
- Ermes Espinoza Veloz (born 1987), Cuban chess grandmaster
- Frank Veloz (1906–1981), American ballroom dancer. See Veloz and Yolanda
- Jean Veloz (1924-2023), American dancer and actress
- Juan Veloz (born 1982), Mexican swimmer
- Julissa Veloz (born 1988), American singer and musician
- Livia Veloz (1892–1980), Dominican writer and feminist activist

== Vehicles ==
- Toyota Veloz, a multi-purpose vehicle marketed by Toyota since 2021 as the successor to the Avanza Veloz (2011–2021)
