= Chess World Cup 2015 =

Chess tournament in Baku, Azerbaijan

FIDE Chess World Cup 2015
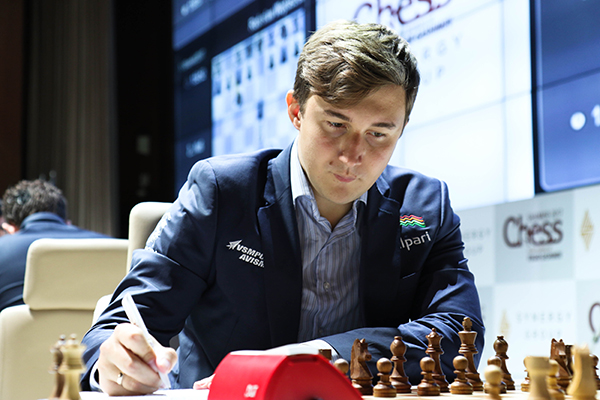
- 2015 FIDE World Cup winner Sergey Karjakin

Tournament information
- Sport: Chess
- Location: Baku, Azerbaijan
- Dates: 10 September 2015–5 October 2015
- Administrator: FIDE
- Tournament format: Single-elimination tournament
- Host: Chess Federation of Azerbaijan

Final positions
- Champion: (Russia) Sergey Karjakin
- Runner-up: (Russia) Peter Svidler

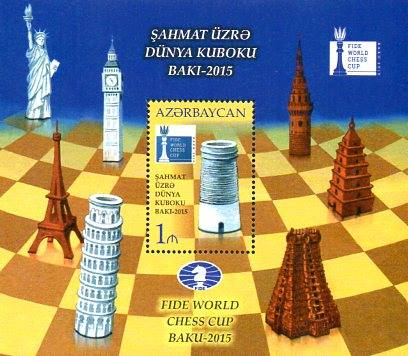
Stamps of Azerbaijan, 2015

The Chess World Cup 2015 was a 128-player single-elimination chess tournament held in Baku, Azerbaijan, from 10 September to 5 October 2015.

Sergey Karjakin won the competition on tie-breaks after a four-game final against Peter Svidler. Both finalists qualified for the 2016 Candidates Tournament.

The winner of the Chess World Cup 2013, Vladimir Kramnik, was defeated by Dmitry Andreikin in the third round.

== Format ==
Matches consisted of two games (except for the final, which consisted of four). Players had 90 minutes for the first 40 moves followed by 30 minutes for the rest of the game with an addition of 30 seconds per move from the start of the game. If a match was tied after the regular games, tie breaks were played the next day. The format for the tie breaks was as follows:

- Two rapid games (25 minutes plus 10 seconds increment).
- If the score was tied after two rapid games, two rapid games (10 minutes plus 10 seconds increment).
- If the score was tied after four rapid games, the opponents play two blitz games (five minutes plus three seconds increment).
- If the score was tied after a pair of blitz games, an armageddon game (in which a draw counts as a win for Black) was played. White had 5 minutes and Black had 4 minutes, with an increment of 3 seconds/move starting from move 61.

== Prize money ==
Round	Prize	Total
Round 1	64 × US $6,000	US $384,000
Round 2	32 × US $10,000	US $320,000
Round 3	16 × US $16,000	US $256,000
Round 4	8 × US $25,000	US $200,000
Round 5	4 × US $35,000	US $140,000
Round 6	2 × US $50,000	US $100,000
Runner-up	US $80,000	US $80,000
Winner	US $120,000	US $120,000
Total		US $1,600,000

According to the regulations, and contrary to many elite tournaments even including the FIDE Grand Prix, all players had to pay their own expenses for travel.

== Participants ==
The qualified players are seeded by their FIDE ratings of August 2015. Eighteen players qualified by rating. All players are grandmasters unless indicated otherwise.

1. Veselin Topalov (BUL), 2816 (R)
2. Hikaru Nakamura (USA), 2814 (R)
3. Fabiano Caruana (USA), 2808 (R)
4. Anish Giri (NED), 2793 (R)
5. Wesley So (USA), 2779 (R)
6. Vladimir Kramnik (RUS), 2777 (WC)
7. Alexander Grischuk (RUS), 2771 (R)
8. Ding Liren (CHN), 2770 (R)
9. Levon Aronian (ARM), 2765 (R)
10. Dmitry Jakovenko (RUS), 2759 (E14)
11. Sergey Karjakin (RUS), 2753 (R)
12. Evgeny Tomashevsky (RUS), 2747 (WC)
13. Boris Gelfand (ISR), 2741 (R)
14. Pentala Harikrishna (IND), 2740 (R)
15. Michael Adams (ENG), 2740 (R)
16. Peter Svidler (RUS), 2739 (R)
17. Teimour Radjabov (AZE), 2738 (ON)
18. Leinier Domínguez (CUB), 2736 (R)
19. Shakhriyar Mamedyarov (AZE), 2735 (R)
20. Radosław Wojtaszek (POL), 2733 (E14)
21. Maxime Vachier-Lagrave (FRA), 2731 (WC)
22. Yu Yangyi (CHN), 2726 (J13)
23. Vassily Ivanchuk (UKR), 2726 (R)
24. Wei Yi (CHN), 2725 (Z3.5)
25. David Navara (CZE), 2724 (E14)
26. Pavel Eljanov (UKR), 2723 (E14)
27. Dmitry Andreikin (RUS), 2720 (WC)
28. Nikita Vitiugov (RUS), 2719 (R)
29. Peter Leko (HUN), 2714 (R)
30. Ni Hua (CHN), 2713 (AS14)
31. Laurent Fressinet (FRA), 2710 (E14)
32. Alexander Moiseenko (UKR), 2710 (E15)
33. Wang Hao (CHN), 2705 (R)
34. Ian Nepomniachtchi (RUS), 2705 (E15)
35. Rustam Kasimdzhanov (UZB), 2704 (AS14)
36. Igor Kovalenko (LAT), 2702 (PN)
37. Lê Quang Liêm (VIE), 2699 (Z3.3)
38. Anton Korobov (UKR), 2699 (E15)
39. Ivan Cheparinov (BUL), 2690 (E14)
40. Maxim Matlakov (RUS), 2689 (E15)
41. Ray Robson (USA), 2680 (Z2.1)
42. Maxim Rodshtein (ISR), 2678 (E15)
43. Igor Lysyj (RUS), 2673 (E14)
44. Gabriel Sargissian (ARM), 2673 (E14)
45. Vladislav Artemiev (RUS), 2671 (E14)
46. Hou Yifan (CHN), 2671 (PN)
47. Gata Kamsky (USA), 2670 (Z2.1)
48. Ilya Smirin (ISR), 2669 (E14)
49. Liviu-Dieter Nisipeanu (GER), 2667 (E15)
50. Viktor Láznička (CZE), 2665 (E15)
51. Sanan Sjugirov (RUS), 2664 (E15)
52. Julio Granda (PER), 2663 (AM14)
53. Nguyễn Ngọc Trường Sơn (VIE), 2662 (Z3.3)
54. Alexander Onischuk (USA), 2662 (Z2.1)
55. Ivan Šarić (CRO), 2661 (E14)
56. Alexander Areshchenko (UKR), 2661 (E14)
57. Ernesto Inarkiev (RUS), 2660 (PN)
58. Vladimir Fedoseev (RUS), 2659 (E14)
59. Lázaro Bruzón (CUB), 2659 (Z2.3)
60. Csaba Balogh (HUN), 2659 (E14)
61. Alexander Motylev (RUS), 2658 (E14)
62. Evgeniy Najer (RUS), 2658 (E15)
63. Sam Shankland (USA), 2655 (AM14)
64. Ivan Bukavshin (RUS), 2655 (E15)
65. Sergei Zhigalko (BLR), 2654 (E14)
66. Ivan Popov (RUS), 2653 (E15)
67. Rauf Mamedov (AZE), 2651 (ON)
68. Boris Grachev (RUS), 2649 (E15)
69. Eltaj Safarli (AZE), 2644 (ON)
70. Vidit Santosh Gujrathi (IND), 2644 (AS15)
71. Baskaran Adhiban (IND), 2643 (AS14)
72. Yuniesky Quezada (CUB), 2643 (AM15)
73. Denis Khismatullin (RUS), 2642 (E15)
74. Bassem Amin (EGY), 2640 (AF)
75. Andrei Volokitin (UKR), 2639 (E15)
76. Robert Kempiński (POL), 2637 (E15)
77. Alexandr Fier (BRA), 2636 (Z2.4)
78. S. P. Sethuraman (IND), 2635 (Z3.7)
79. Varuzhan Akobian (USA), 2635 (Z2.1)
80. David Antón Guijarro (ESP), 2635 (E14)
81. Romain Édouard (FRA), 2634 (ACP)
82. Hrant Melkumyan (ARM), 2633 (E14)
83. Rafael Leitão (BRA), 2632 (AM14)
84. Surya Shekhar Ganguly (IND), 2631 (AS15)
85. Mateusz Bartel (POL), 2631 (E15)
86. Constantin Lupulescu (ROU), 2626 (E14)
87. Eduardo Iturrizaga (VEN), 2625 (AM15)
88. Yuri Vovk (UKR), 2624 (E15)
89. Gadir Guseinov (AZE), 2624 (PN)
90. Alexander Ipatov (TUR), 2622 (E15)
91. Dragan Šolak (TUR), 2622 (E14)
92. Vasif Durarbayli (AZE), 2621 (ON)
93. Wen Yang (CHN), 2618 (AS14)
94. Anton Kovalyov (CAN), 2616 (AM15)
95. Zhao Jun (CHN), 2616 (Z3.5)
96. Miloš Perunović (SRB), 2614 (E14)
97. Lu Shanglei (CHN), 2607 (J14)
98. Ante Brkić (CRO), 2607 (E15)
99. Sandro Mareco (ARG), 2605 (Z2.5)
100. Aleksey Goganov (RUS), 2603 (E15)
101. Samvel Ter-Sahakyan (ARM), 2601 (E14)
102. Zhou Jianchao (CHN), 2600 (AS15)
103. Rinat Jumabayev (KAZ), 2600 (Z3.4)
104. Tamir Nabaty (ISR), 2595 (E15)
105. Salem A. R. Saleh (UAE), 2595 (AS14)
106. Ahmed Adly (EGY), 2591 (AF)
107. Viorel Iordăchescu (MDA), 2589 (E14)
108. Isan Reynaldo Ortiz Suárez (CUB), 2577 (AM14)
109. M. R. Lalith Babu (IND), 2570 (AS15)
110. Pouya Idani (IRI), 2568 (Z3.1)
111. Federico Perez Ponsa (ARG), 2563 (AM15)
112. Samuel Sevian (USA), 2553 (Z2.1)
113. Emre Can (TUR), 2547 (E15)
114. Mariya Muzychuk (UKR), 2528 (WWC)
115. Max Illingworth, IM (AUS), 2514 (Z3.6)
116. Cristobal Henriquez Villagra, IM (CHI), 2511 (Z2.5)
117. Ziaur Rahman (BAN), 2509 (Z3.2)
118. Ermes Espinoza Veloz, FM (CUB), 2495 (Z2.3)
119. Ilia Iljiushenok, IM (RUS), 2491 (E15)
120. Michael Wiedenkeller, IM (LUX), 2453 (PN)
121. Tomas Krnan, IM (CAN), 2436 (Z2.2)
122. Yusup Atabayev, IM (TKM), 2428 (Z3.4)
123. Deysi Cori, WGM (PER), 2421 (Z2.4)
124. Parham Maghsoodloo, untitled (IRI), 2416 (AS15)
125. Arthur Ssegwanyi, IM (UGA), 2357 (Z4.2)
126. Amir Zaibi, FM (TUN), 2330 (Z4.1)
127. Richmond Phiri, IM (ZAM), 2291 (Z4.3)
128. Oladapo Adu, IM (NGR), 2241 (Z4.4)

=== Qualification paths ===
- WC: Semi-finalists of the Chess World Cup 2013 (4)
- WWC: Women's World Champion 2015 (1)
- J13 and J14: World Junior Champions 2013 and 2014 (2)
- R: Rating (average of all published ratings from February 2014 to January 2015 is used) (19)
- E14 and E15: European Individual Championships 2014 (23) and 2015 (23)
- AM14 and AM15: American Continental Championships 2014 (4) and 2015 (4)
- AS14 and AS15: Asian Chess Championships 2014 (5) and 2015 (5)
- AF: African Chess Championship 2015 (2)
- Z2.1 (5), Z2.2 (1), Z2.3 (2), Z2.4 (2), Z2.5 (2), Z3.1 (1), Z3.2 (1), Z3.3 (2), Z3.4 (2), Z3.5 (2), Z3.6 (1), Z3.7 (1), Z4.1 (1), Z4.2 (1), Z4.3 (1), Z4.4 (1): Zonal tournaments
- ACP: highest-placed participant of the ACP Tour who has not qualified with the previous criteria (1)
- PN: FIDE President nominee (5)
- ON: Organizer nominee (4)

== Calendar ==
Round	Regular games	Tiebreaks
Round 1	11–12 September	13 September
Round 2	14–15 September	16 September
Round 3	17–18 September	19 September
Round 4	20–21 September	22 September
Quarterfinals	23–24 September	25 September
Semifinals	27–28 September	29 September
Final	1–4 October	5 October

== Results, Rounds 1–4 ==
=== Section 1 ===
First round
1	(Bulgaria) Veselin Topalov	2
128	(Nigeria) Oladapo Adu	0
65	(Belarus) Sergei Zhigalko	3
64	(Russia) Ivan Bukavshin	1
33	(China) Wang Hao	2½
96	(Serbia) Miloš Perunović	1½
97	(China) Lu Shanglei	2½
32	(Ukraine) Alexander Moiseenko	1½
17	(Azerbaijan) Teimour Radjabov	3
112	(United States) Samuel Sevian	1
81	(France) Romain Édouard	½
48	(Israel) Ilya Smirin	1½
49	(Germany) Liviu-Dieter Nisipeanu	1½
80	(Spain) David Antón Guijarro	½
113	(Turkey) Emre Can	½
16	(Russia) Peter Svidler	1½

Quarter-finals
1	(Bulgaria) Veselin Topalov	1½
65	(Belarus) Sergei Zhigalko	½
33	(China) Wang Hao	½
97	(China) Lu Shanglei	1½
17	(Azerbaijan) Teimour Radjabov	3
48	(Israel) Ilya Smirin	1
49	(Germany) Liviu-Dieter Nisipeanu	1½
16	(Russia) Peter Svidler	2½

Third round
1	(Bulgaria) Veselin Topalov	2½
97	(China) Lu Shanglei	1½
17	(Azerbaijan) Teimour Radjabov	1½
16	(Russia) Peter Svidler	2½

Fourth round
1	(Bulgaria) Veselin Topalov	½
16	(Russia) Peter Svidler	1½

=== Section 2 ===
First round
9	(Armenia) Levon Aronian	2
120	(Luxembourg) Michael Wiedenkeller	0
73	(Russia) Denis Khismatullin	½
56	(Ukraine) Alexander Areshchenko	1½
41	(United States) Ray Robson	½
88	(Ukraine) Yuri Vovk	1½
105	(United Arab Emirates) Salem A. R. Saleh	½
24	(China) Wei Yi	1½
25	(Czech Republic) David Navara	3
104	(Israel) Tamir Nabaty	1
89	(Azerbaijan) Gadir Guseinov	3
40	(Russia) Maxim Matlakov	1
57	(Russia) Ernesto Inarkiev	3
72	(Cuba) Yuniesky Quezada	1
121	(Canada) Tomas Krnan	½
8	(China) Ding Liren	1½

Quarter-finals
9	(Armenia) Levon Aronian	1
56	(Ukraine) Alexander Areshchenko	3
88	(Ukraine) Yuri Vovk	3½
24	(China) Wei Yi	4½
25	(Czech Republic) David Navara	½
89	(Azerbaijan) Gadir Guseinov	1½
57	(Russia) Ernesto Inarkiev	½
8	(China) Ding Liren	1½

Third round
56	(Ukraine) Alexander Areshchenko	½
24	(China) Wei Yi	1½
89	(Azerbaijan) Gadir Guseinov	½
8	(China) Ding Liren	1½

Fourth round
24	(China) Wei Yi	3½
8	(China) Ding Liren	2½

=== Section 3 ===
First round
5	(United States) Wesley So	2
124	(Iran) Parham Maghsoodloo	0
69	(Azerbaijan) Eltaj Safarli	2½
60	(Hungary) Csaba Balogh	3½
37	(Vietnam) Lê Quang Liêm	1½
92	(Azerbaijan) Vasif Durarbayli	½
101	(Armenia) Samvel Ter-Sahakyan	1
28	(Russia) Nikita Vitiugov	3
21	(France) Maxime Vachier-Lagrave	1½
108	(Cuba) Isan Reynaldo Ortiz Suárez	½
85	(Poland) Mateusz Bartel	4½
44	(Armenia) Gabriel Sargissian	4½
53	(Vietnam) Nguyễn Ngọc Trường Sơn	1½
76	(Poland) Robert Kempiński	½
117	(Bangladesh) Ziaur Rahman	1
12	(Russia) Evgeny Tomashevsky	3

Quarter-finals
5	(United States) Wesley So	2
60	(Hungary) Csaba Balogh	0
37	(Vietnam) Lê Quang Liêm	2½
28	(Russia) Nikita Vitiugov	1½
21	(France) Maxime Vachier-Lagrave	1½
44	(Armenia) Gabriel Sargissian	½
53	(Vietnam) Nguyễn Ngọc Trường Sơn	2½
12	(Russia) Evgeny Tomashevsky	3½

Third round
5	(United States) Wesley So	2½
37	(Vietnam) Lê Quang Liêm	1½
21	(France) Maxime Vachier-Lagrave	4
12	(Russia) Evgeny Tomashevsky	2

Fourth round
5	(United States) Wesley So	½
21	(France) Maxime Vachier-Lagrave	1½

=== Section 4 ===
First round
13	(Israel) Boris Gelfand	1½
116	(Chile) Cristóbal Henríquez Villagra	2½
77	(Brazil) Alexandr Fier	½
52	(Peru) Julio Granda	1½
45	(Russia) Vladislav Artemiev	1½
84	(India) Surya Shekhar Ganguly	½
109	(India) Lalith Babu	½
20	(Poland) Radosław Wojtaszek	1½
29	(Hungary) Peter Leko	1½
100	(Russia) Aleksey Goganov	½
93	(China) Wen Yang	1½
36	(Latvia) Igor Kovalenko	½
61	(Russia) Alexander Motylev	4½
68	(Russia) Boris Grachev	3½
125	(Uganda) Arthur Ssegwanyi	½
4	(Netherlands) Anish Giri	1½

Quarter-finals
116	(Chile) Cristóbal Henríquez Villagra	0
52	(Peru) Julio Granda	2
45	(Russia) Vladislav Artemiev	½
20	(Poland) Radosław Wojtaszek	1½
29	(Hungary) Peter Leko	1½
93	(China) Wen Yang	½
61	(Russia) Alexander Motylev	1
4	(Netherlands) Anish Giri	3

Third round
52	(Peru) Julio Granda	½
20	(Poland) Radosław Wojtaszek	1½
29	(Hungary) Peter Leko	½
4	(Netherlands) Anish Giri	1½

Fourth round
20	(Poland) Radosław Wojtaszek	1
4	(Netherlands) Anish Giri	3

=== Section 5 ===
First round
3	(United States) Fabiano Caruana	2
126	(Tunisia) Amir Zaibi	0
67	(Azerbaijan) Rauf Mamedov	1½
62	(Russia) Evgeniy Najer	½
35	(Uzbekistan) Rustam Kasimdzhanov	3½
94	(Canada) Anton Kovalyov	4½
99	(Argentina) Sandro Mareco	1½
30	(China) Ni Hua	½
19	(Azerbaijan) Shakhriyar Mamedyarov	1½
110	(Iran) Pouya Idani	½
83	(Brazil) Rafael Leitão	1½
46	(China) Hou Yifan	2½
51	(Russia) Sanan Sjugirov	0
78	(India) S. P. Sethuraman	2
115	(Australia) Max Illingworth	½
14	(India) Pentala Harikrishna	1½

Quarter-finals
3	(United States) Fabiano Caruana	1½
67	(Azerbaijan) Rauf Mamedov	½
94	(Canada) Anton Kovalyov	1½
99	(Argentina) Sandro Mareco	½
19	(Azerbaijan) Shakhriyar Mamedyarov	2½
46	(China) Hou Yifan	1½
78	(India) S. P. Sethuraman	1½
14	(India) Pentala Harikrishna	½

Third round
3	(United States) Fabiano Caruana	1½
94	(Canada) Anton Kovalyov	½
19	(Azerbaijan) Shakhriyar Mamedyarov	1½
78	(India) S. P. Sethuraman	½

Fourth round
3	(United States) Fabiano Caruana	½
19	(Azerbaijan) Shakhriyar Mamedyarov	1½

=== Section 6 ===
First round
11	(Russia) Sergey Karjakin	2
118	(Cuba) Ermes Espinosa Veloz	0
75	(Ukraine) Andrei Volokitin	1½
54	(United States) Alexander Onischuk	2½
43	(Russia) Igor Lysyj	4
86	(Romania) Constantin Lupulescu	2
107	(Moldova) Viorel Iordăchescu	0
22	(China) Yu Yangyi	2
27	(Russia) Dmitry Andreikin	1½
102	(China) Zhou Jianchao	½
91	(Turkey) Dragan Šolak	½
38	(Ukraine) Anton Korobov	1½
59	(Cuba) Lázaro Bruzón	3
70	(India) Santosh Gujrathi Vidit	1
123	(Peru) Deysi Cori	0
6	(Russia) Vladimir Kramnik	2

Quarter-finals
11	(Russia) Sergey Karjakin	4
54	(United States) Alexander Onischuk	2
43	(Russia) Igor Lysyj	2½
22	(China) Yu Yangyi	3½
27	(Russia) Dmitry Andreikin	1½
38	(Ukraine) Anton Korobov	½
59	(Cuba) Lázaro Bruzón	½
6	(Russia) Vladimir Kramnik	1½

Third round
11	(Russia) Sergey Karjakin	1½
22	(China) Yu Yangyi	½
27	(Russia) Dmitry Andreikin	2½
6	(Russia) Vladimir Kramnik	1½

Fourth round
11	(Russia) Sergey Karjakin	2½
27	(Russia) Dmitry Andreikin	1½

=== Section 7 ===
First round
7	(Russia) Alexander Grischuk	5
122	(Turkmenistan) Yusup Atabayev	3
71	(India) Baskaran Adhiban	1½
58	(Russia) Vladimir Fedoseev	2½
39	(Bulgaria) Ivan Cheparinov	½
90	(Turkey) Alexander Ipatov	1½
103	(Kazakhstan) Rinat Jumabayev	0
26	(Ukraine) Pavel Eljanov	2
23	(Ukraine) Vassily Ivanchuk	1½
106	(Egypt) Ahmed Adly	½
87	(Venezuela) Eduardo Iturrizaga	½
42	(Israel) Maxim Rodshtein	1½
55	(Croatia) Ivan Šarić	0
74	(Egypt) Bassem Amin	2
119	(Russia) Ilia Iljiushenok	3
10	(Russia) Dmitry Jakovenko	5

Quarter-finals
7	(Russia) Alexander Grischuk	3½
58	(Russia) Vladimir Fedoseev	2½
90	(Turkey) Alexander Ipatov	0
26	(Ukraine) Pavel Eljanov	2
23	(Ukraine) Vassily Ivanchuk	1½
42	(Israel) Maxim Rodshtein	½
74	(Egypt) Bassem Amin	1½
10	(Russia) Dmitry Jakovenko	2½

Third round
7	(Russia) Alexander Grischuk	0
26	(Ukraine) Pavel Eljanov	2
23	(Ukraine) Vassily Ivanchuk	½
10	(Russia) Dmitry Jakovenko	1½

Fourth round
26	(Ukraine) Pavel Eljanov	2½
10	(Russia) Dmitry Jakovenko	1½

=== Section 8 ===
First round
15	(England) Michael Adams	1½
114	(Ukraine) Mariya Muzychuk	½
79	(United States) Varuzhan Akobian	½
50	(Czech Republic) Viktor Láznička	1½
47	(United States) Gata Kamsky	½
82	(Armenia) Hrant Melkumyan	1½
111	(Argentina) Federico Pérez Ponsa	1½
18	(Cuba) Leinier Domínguez	2½
31	(France) Laurent Fressinet	3
98	(Croatia) Ante Brkić	1
95	(China) Zhao Jun	1
34	(Russia) Ian Nepomniachtchi	3
63	(United States) Sam Shankland	1½
66	(Russia) Ivan Popov	½
127	(Zambia) Richmond Phiri	0
2	(United States) Hikaru Nakamura	2

Quarter-finals
15	(England) Michael Adams	5
50	(Czech Republic) Viktor Láznička	4
82	(Armenia) Hrant Melkumyan	½
18	(Cuba) Leinier Domínguez	1½
31	(France) Laurent Fressinet	3½
34	(Russia) Ian Nepomniachtchi	4½
63	(United States) Sam Shankland	1½
2	(United States) Hikaru Nakamura	2½

Third round
15	(England) Michael Adams	5
18	(Cuba) Leinier Domínguez	3
34	(Russia) Ian Nepomniachtchi	4
2	(United States) Hikaru Nakamura	5

Fourth round
15	(England) Michael Adams	½
2	(United States) Hikaru Nakamura	1½

== Results, rounds 5–7 ==
Quarterfinals
16	(Russia) Peter Svidler	3½
24	(China) Wei Yi	2½
21	(France) Maxime Vachier-Lagrave	½
4	(Netherlands) Anish Giri	1½
19	(Azerbaijan) Shakhriyar Mamedyarov	2
11	(Russia) Sergey Karjakin	4
26	(Ukraine) Pavel Eljanov	1½
2	(United States) Hikaru Nakamura	½

Semifinals
16	(Russia) Peter Svidler	1½
4	(Netherlands) Anish Giri	½
11	(Russia) Sergey Karjakin	3½
26	(Ukraine) Pavel Eljanov	2½

Final (best of 4)
16	(Russia) Peter Svidler	4
11	(Russia) Sergey Karjakin	6

=== Final, 1–5 October ===
Seed	Name	Sep 2015 rating	1	2	3	4	R1	R2	R3	R4	B1	B2	Total
16	Peter Svidler (RUS)	2727	1	1	0	0	0	1	1	0	0	0	4
11	Sergey Karjakin (RUS)	2762	0	0	1	1	1	0	0	1	1	1	6
