= Wen Yang (chess player) =

Chinese chess grandmaster (born 1988)

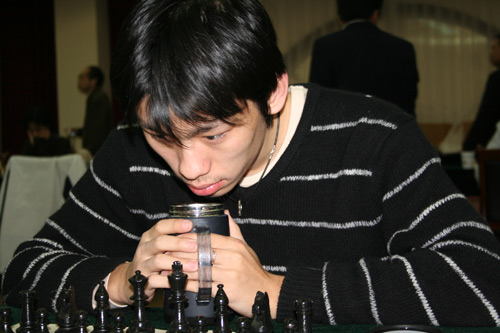

Personal information
- Born: July 7, 1988 (age 38) Shandong, China

Chess career
- Country: China
- Title: Grandmaster (2008)
- FIDE rating: 2575 (July 2026)
- Peak rating: 2631 (January 2013)

Wen Yang
- Chinese: 温阳
Transcriptions
Standard Mandarin
- Hanyu Pinyin: Wēn Yáng
- Wade–Giles: Wen Chan
- Tongyong Pinyin: Wūn Yáng
- Yale Romanization: Wēn Yáng
- IPA: [wə́n jǎŋ]
Yue: Cantonese
- Yale Romanization: Wān Yeùhng
- Jyutping: Wan1 Joeng4
- IPA: [wɐ́n jœ̏ŋ]

Wen Yang (Chinese: 温阳; born 7 July 1988) is a Chinese chess player. In 2008, he became China's 25th Grandmaster. He achieved the norms required for the grandmaster title at the 2006 World Junior Chess Championship and the 2007 Asian Chess Championship.

He has competed in two FIDE World Cups. In 2007, Wen Yang was defeated ½-1½ by Zoltán Almási in the first round and as a result was eliminated from the tournament. In the 2015 edition, he knocked out Igor Kovalenko in the inaugural round to reach the second, where he lost to Peter Leko. In 2018 Wen won the Chinese Chess Championship edging out Bai Jinshi on tiebreak score, after both players finished on 7½/11 points.

Wen was a member of the gold medal-winning Chinese team in the World Team Chess Championship of 2017. In 2012 he played for China's second team in the Asian Team Chess Championship. In 2008 Wen Yang was a member of the silver medal-winning team Qi Yuan Club in the 1st Asian Club Cup in Al Ain. Wen plays for Shandong in the China Chess League (CCL).
