= Oladapo Adu =

Nigerian chess player (born 1971)

Personal information
- Born: June 6, 1971 (age 55)

Chess career
- Country: Nigeria
- Title: International Master (1999)
- Peak rating: 2334 (August 2016)

Oladapo Olutola Adu is a Nigerian chess player and International Master.

Adu qualified to play in the 31st Chess Olympiad in Moscow and became the Nigerian national champion in 1995.

Adu qualified for the 32nd Chess Olympiad, but Nigeria withdrew due to a lack of resources. He has since played in further Olympiads for Nigeria, including the 33rd Chess Olympiad.

In 2015, Adu qualified for the Chess World Cup 2015, being knocked out in the first round by Veselin Topalov.
