= Arthur Ssegwanyi =

Ugandan chess player (born 1988)

Personal information
- Born: March 12, 1988 (age 38)

Chess career
- Country: Uganda
- Title: International Master (2015)
- Peak rating: 2412 (April 2022)

Arthur Ssegwanyi (born March 12, 1988) is a Ugandan chess player.

== Biography ==
He was awarded the title of International Master (IM) by FIDE in 2015 as a result of winning the Zone 4.2 Individual Championship in the same year. This victory also qualified him to play in the FIDE World Cup 2015. In this event, he was paired against the fourth seed, Anish Giri. Ssegwanyi drew the first game in 158 moves, then lost the second game and consequently he was eliminated from the tournament. In 2016, he won the Tanzania Open Chess Championship in Dar es Salaam. Ssegwanyi has played for the Ugandan team in the Chess Olympiad since 2012.
