= Ilia Iljiushenok =

Russian chess grandmaster (born 1993)

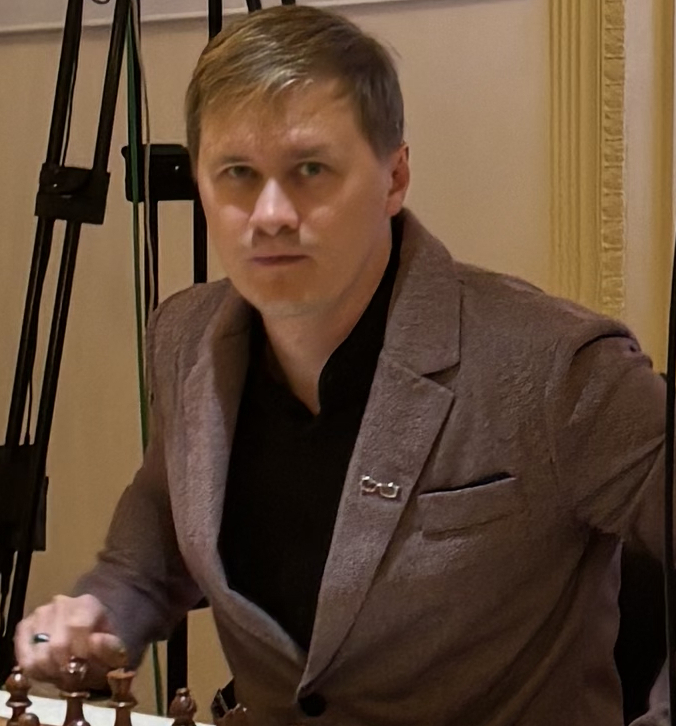
- Iljiushenok in 2025

Personal information
- Born: 16 August 1993 (age 32) Langepas, Russia

Chess career
- Country: Russia (until 2023); FIDE (since 2023)
- Title: Grandmaster (2018)
- FIDE rating: 2503 (July 2026)
- Peak rating: 2567 (October 2022)

Ilia Iljiushenok (born 1993) is a Russian chess grandmaster.

== Chess career ==
He has represented his country in the 2010 Chess Olympiad, and played in the Chess World Cup 2015, being defeated by Dmitry Jakovenko in the first round.

== Reviews ==
Luke McShane wrote in the January 2024 issue of The Spectator, "Iljiushenok’s brilliancy reminded me of a famous combination, played by a young Botvinnik, almost two decades before he became world champion in 1948."
