= Amir Zaibi =

Tunisian chess grandmaster (born 1988)

Personal information
- Born: 22 May 1988 (age 38)

Chess career
- Country: Tunisia
- Title: Grandmaster (2020)
- Peak rating: 2423 (January 2022)

Amir Zaibi (born 22 May 1988) is a Tunisian chess Grandmaster since 2020. According to the International Chess Federation, he is the highest rated active chess player in Tunisia.

== Chess career ==
He played in the Chess World Cup 2015, being defeated by Fabiano Caruana in the first round.

He won the International Arab Championship in Mostaganem in 2019 and obtained the title of Grandmaster on 4 December 2019.
