= Yusup Atabayev =

Turkmenistani chess grandmaster (born 1994)

Personal information
- Born: 11 May 1994 (age 32) Ashgabat, Turkmenistan

Chess career
- Country: Turkmenistan
- Title: Grandmaster (2023)
- FIDE rating: 2434 (July 2026)
- Peak rating: 2516 (February 2023)

Yusup Atabayev is a Turkmenistani chess grandmaster.

== Chess career ==
He has represented his country in a number of chess olympiads, including 2008 (where he scored 4/10 on board three), 2012 (4½/10 on board four), 2014 (where the team played no games), 2016 (7/11 on board two) and 2018 (8/11 on board four).

He played in the Chess World Cup 2015, where he was defeated 5–3 by Alexander Grischuk in the first round.
