= Ermes Espinosa Veloz =

Cuban chess grandmaster (born 1987)

Ermes Espinoza Veloz
Personal information
- Born: July 30, 1987 (age 39) Santa Clara, Cuba

Chess career
- Country: Cuba
- Title: Grandmaster (2017)
- FIDE rating: 2468 (September 2026)
- Peak rating: 2544 (April 2018)

Ermes Espinoza Veloz (born 1987) is a Cuban chess grandmaster.

== Chess career ==
He played in the Chess World Cup 2015, being defeated by the eventual winner Sergey Karjakin in the first round. He was awarded the title of Grandmaster (GM) by FIDE in 2017.
