= Anton Kovalyov =

Canadian chess grandmaster (born 1992)

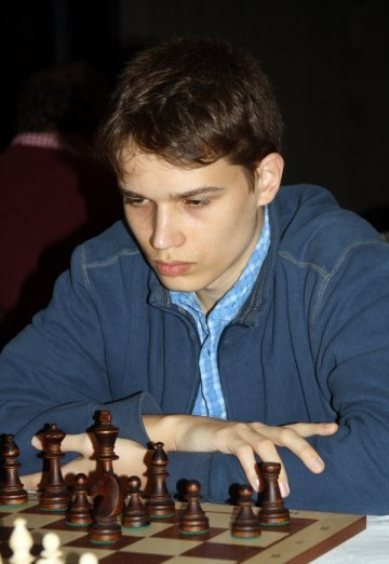
- Kovalyov at the Figueira da Foz tournament in 2009

Personal information
- Born: 4 March 1992 (age 34) Kharkiv, Ukraine

Chess career
- Country: Argentina (until 2013); Canada (since 2013)
- Title: Grandmaster (2008)
- FIDE rating: 2631 (July 2026)
- Peak rating: 2664 (November 2017)
- Peak ranking: No. 80 (November 2017)

Anton Kovalyov (born 4 March 1992) is a Canadian chess grandmaster. He has been a team member for Argentina and subsequently Canada at Chess Olympiads.

== Chess biography ==
Born in Kharkiv, Ukraine, Kovalyov moved to Argentina in 2000, where he learned to play chess under the tutelage of Pablo Ricardi and Oscar Panno.

In 2004, he finished equal first at the Pan American Under-12 Championship and was awarded the title of FIDE Master.

In 2007 he moved to Montreal, Quebec, Canada, with his family.

In 2008 Kovalyov played for the Argentine team at the 38th Chess Olympiad. He received the grandmaster title at the FIDE Congress held during the competition.

In 2009 he won the Quebec Invitational Championship as well as the Quebec Junior Championship for three consecutive years from 2010-12.

In 2014, Kovalyov, who had switched to the Chess Federation of Canada in 2013, played for Canada on the top board at the 41st Chess Olympiad. He scored 7/11 (+4–1=6) for a performance rating of 2670.

At the 2015 American Continental Chess Championship he scored 8/11 finishing in a tie for third with other five players, with whom he played a rapid playoff to earn a spot in the Chess World Cup 2015. In the latter he knocked out Rustam Kasimdzhanov and Sandro Mareco in rounds one and two, respectively, but was eliminated by Fabiano Caruana in the third round.

In May 2016, he tied for second at the American Continental Chess Championship, qualifying for a place in the Chess World Cup 2017.

In September 2016, he competed for Canada on board 2 at the 42nd Chess Olympiad. He scored 8/10 (+6–0=4) for a performance rating of 2852. His silver-medal winning performance on board 2 was second only to that of the former world champion, Vladimir Kramnik, of Russia.

At the Chess World Cup 2017, Kovalyov defeated Varuzhan Akobian and former world champion Viswanathan Anand in the first and second rounds, and was due to face Maxim Rodshtein in the third. Shortly before the game with Rodshtein was due to start, tournament director Zurab Azmaiparashvili confronted Kovalyov regarding his dress. Heated words were exchanged and Kovalyov exited the venue, forfeiting the game and match. Kovalyov said part of his anger came from Azmaiparashvili shouting that he was dressed like a 'gypsy,' a word that struck him as a racial slur. The Canadian Chess Federation filed a complaint about the incident, which received international coverage.

Kovalyov graduated with a master's degree in computer science from the University of Texas at Dallas in 2019. As of 2024, he is pursuing a PhD in Electrical Engineering at the Statistical Signal Processing Research Laboratory at the University.
