= Csaba Balogh =

Hungarian chess grandmaster (born 1987)

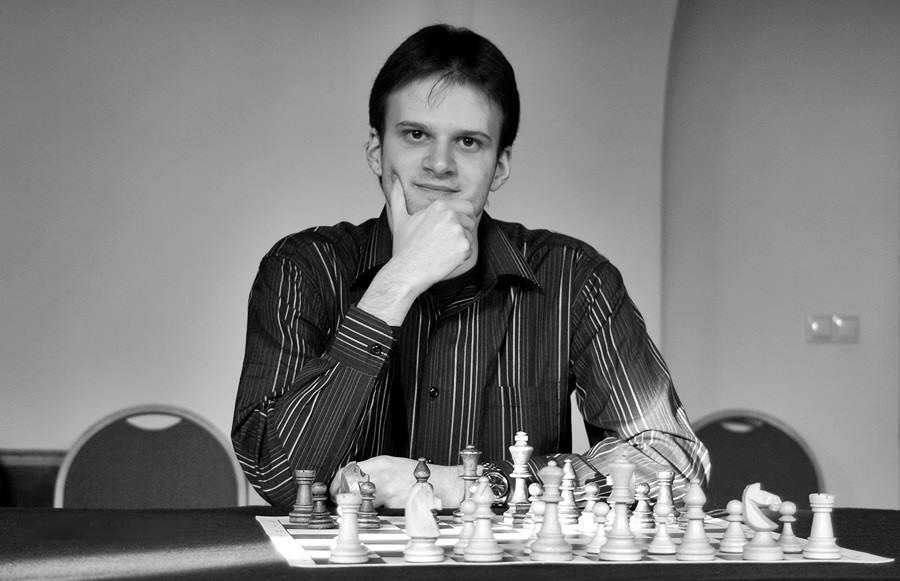

Personal information
- Born: 10 March 1987 (age 39) Budapest, Hungary

Chess career
- Country: Hungary
- Title: Grandmaster (2004)
- FIDE rating: 2544 (July 2026)
- Peak rating: 2672 (May 2012)
- Peak ranking: No. 80 (May 2012)

Csaba Balogh (born 10 March 1987 in Budapest) is a Hungarian chess grandmaster.

== Chess career ==
Balogh was taught how to play chess by his father, when he was six years old. At the age of eight, he began training with IM Böröcz István, who took Balogh to his first tournament the following year.

He won the European Under-16 Championship in 2003. In the same year, Balogh was a member of the Hungarian national team that won both the U-16 Chess Olympiad and the European U-18 Team Chess Championship.

In 2006 he finished second in the Hungarian Chess Championship.

In 2011 he tied for 2nd-5th with Parimarjan Negi, Murtas Kazhgaleyev and Jon Ludvig Hammer in the 13th Dubai Open Chess Championship. Balogh won the Casino de Barcelona round-robin tournament in 2013 and 2014.

He was a member of the silver medal-winning Hungarian team in the 2014 Chess Olympiad. He also won the individual silver on board two thanks to his rating performance of 2839.

Balogh competed in the Chess World Cup 2015: he knocked out Eltaj Safarli in the first round, then he lost to Wesley So in round two and was eliminated from the competition.

In the 2015–2016 season Balogh became Dutch champion with En Passant.

Divya Deshmukh credited Balogh for her preparation as one of her seconds during the Women's Chess World Cup 2025, which she won.

== Sample games ==
This game Balogh says is one of his "most memorable". It was played against Viktor Korchnoi at the 5th Gyorgy Marx Memorial (2007). As white, Balogh played the Ruy Lopez, Open Defence (C80).

1. e4 e5 2. Nf3 Nc6 3. Bb5 a6 4. Ba4 Nf6 5. O-O Nxe4 6. d4 b5 7. Bb3 d5 8. dxe5 Be6 9. Be3 Bc5 10. Qe2 O-O 11. Rd1 Re8 12. c4 d4 13. Nc3 Nd6 14. Bxd4 Nxd4 15. Nxd4 Bxc4 16. Bxc4 Nxc4 17. Ndxb5 Qh4 18. g3 Qh3 19. Qxc4 Bxf2+ 20. Kxf2 Qxh2+ 21. Kf3 axb5 22. Qe2 Qh5+ 23. Kg2 Qxe2+ 24. Nxe2 Rxe5 25. Nd4 c5 26. Nxb5 Re2+ 27. Kh3 Rxb2 28. Nc7 Rc8 29. Nd5 Re8 30. a4 f5 31. Re1 Rxe1 32. Rxe1 Ra2 33. Re8+ Kf7 34. Re7+ Kg6 35. Ra7 Kh6 36. a5 c4 37. Ne3 c3 38. Nxf5+ Kg6 39. Ne7+ Kh6 40. Nf5+ Kg6 41. Ne7+ Kh6 42. a6 c2 43. Rc7 Rxa6 44. Rxc2 Ra7 45. Nd5 Rd7 46. Rc6+ Kg5 47. Nf4 Kf5 48. Rc5+ Ke4 49. Kg4 h6 50. Rc6 Ke3 51. Rg6 Kf2 52. Nh5 1-0

The game features Balogh playing black in a Slav Defense. This was played against Tomi Nybäck at the 2008 Najdorf Memorial tournament, dedicated to the memory of Miguel Najdorf and organized by the Warsaw Chess Foundation.

1. d4 d5 2. c4 c6 3. Nf3 Nf6 4. e3 Bf5 5. Nc3 e6 6. Nh4 Be4 7. f3 Bg6 8. Qb3 Qc7 9. Bd2 Be7 10. Nxg6 hxg6 11. O-O-O a6 12. Kb1 dxc4 13. Bxc4 b5 14. Be2 c5 15. Rc1 c4 16. Nxb5 axb5 17. Qxb5+ Nbd7 18. Bxc4 Qa7 19. Bb3 O-O 20. h4 Rfb8 21. Qd3 Rb6 22. g4 Ra6 23. g5 Nh5 24. Kc2 Nb6 25. e4 Bd6 26. Rhg1 Nd7 27. Rcf1 e5 28. f4 exd4 29. e5 Rc8+ 30. Kd1 Nc5 31. Qc4 Bf8 32. f5 Nxb3 33. Qxb3 Rb6 34. Qd5 Rxb2 35. fxg6 Rb1+ 36. Ke2 Qa6+ 37. Kf2 Rxf1+ 38. Rxf1 Qxg6 0-1
