= S. P. Sethuraman =

Indian chess grandmaster (born 1993)

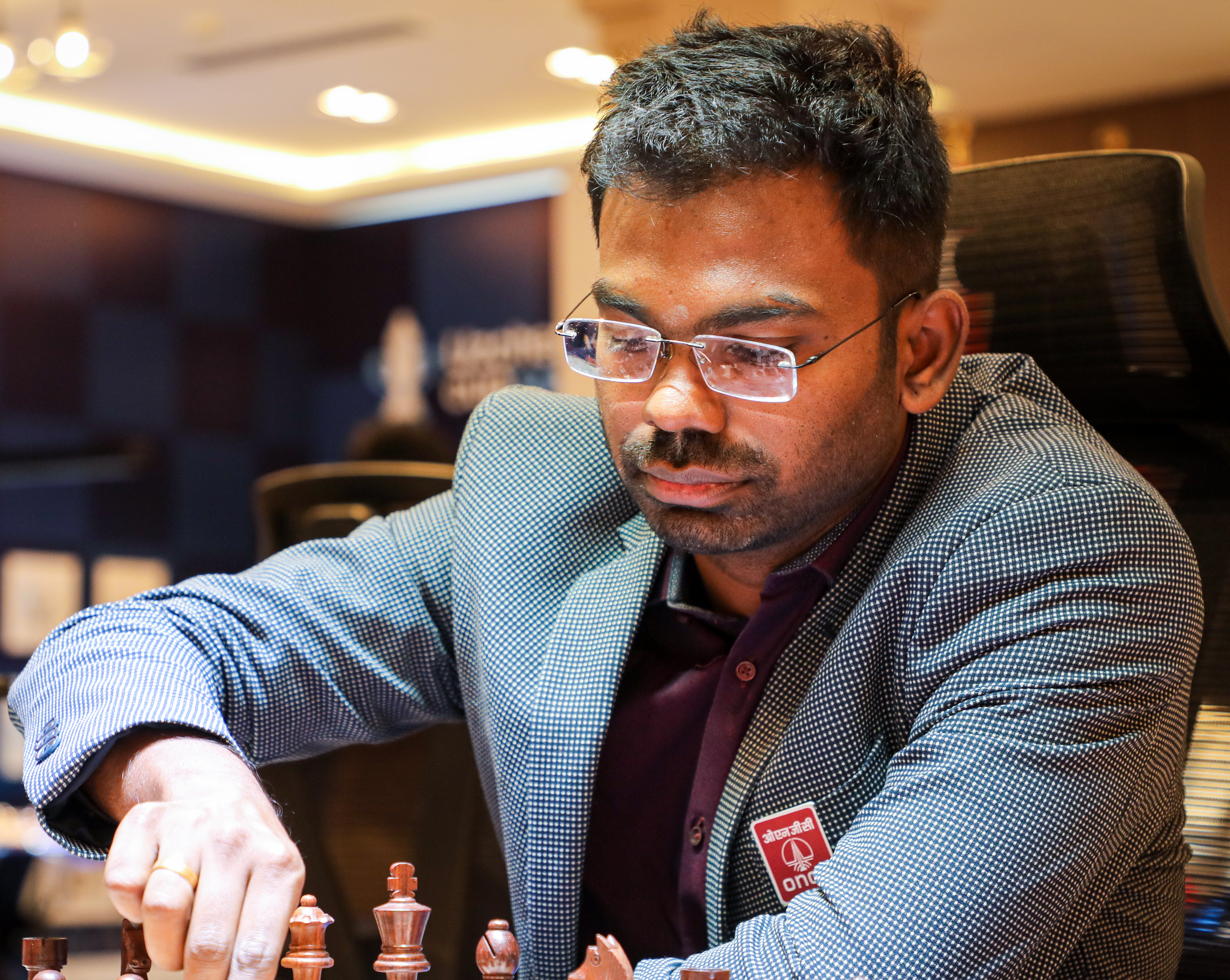
- Sethuraman in 2026

Personal information
- Born: Sethuraman Panayappan Sethuraman; 25 February 1993 (age 33) Madras, Tamil Nadu, India

Chess career
- Country: India
- Title: Grandmaster (2011)
- FIDE rating: 2541 (August 2026)
- Peak rating: 2673 (September 2018)
- Peak ranking: No. 69 (September 2018)

Sethuraman Panayappan Sethuraman (born 25 February 1993 in Chennai) is an Indian chess grandmaster.

== Career ==
He achieved the three norms required for the grandmaster title with shared second place and a score of 8/10 points at the Parsvnath Open in New Delhi in 2009, third place and 6.5/9 score at the Paris International Championship in 2010, and winning the Voivoda Cup in Legnica with 7/9 in the same year.

Sethuraman won the 2004 Asian under-12 championship in Singapore and the 2009 world U16 championship in Antalya. In 2014, Sethuraman took team bronze medal with the Indian team at the 41st Chess Olympiad in Tromsø and won the Indian National Premier Championship. With this win, he qualified for the Chess World Cup 2015, where he knocked out Sanan Sjugirov in round one and compatriot Pentala Harikrishna in the second round, before being eliminated by Shakhriyar Mamedyarov in the third.

In 2016 he won the Asian Chess Championship in Tashkent.

In February 2018, he participated in the Aeroflot Open. He finished second out of ninety-two, scoring 6½/9 (+5–1=3).
