= Alexander Ipatov =

Ukrainian-Turkish chess grandmaster (born 1993)

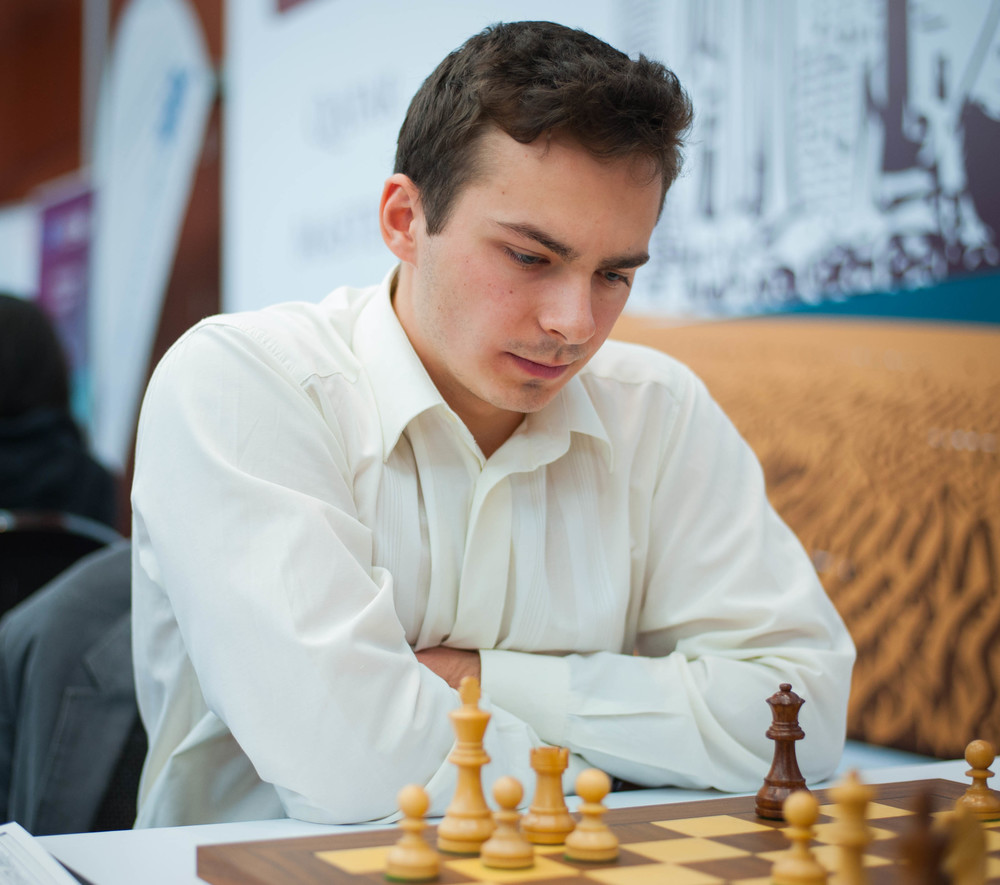
- Ipatov in 2015

Personal information
- Born: 16 July 1993 (age 32) Lviv, Ukraine

Chess career
- Country: Ukraine (until 2008); Spain (2009–2011); Turkey (since 2012)
- Title: Grandmaster (2011)
- FIDE rating: 2644 (July 2026)
- Peak rating: 2665 (February 2018)
- Peak ranking: No. 78 (March 2018)

Alexander Vladimirovich Ipatov (Ukrainian: Олександр Іпатов, romanized: Oleksandr Ipatov; born 16 July 1993) is a Ukrainian-born Turkish chess grandmaster. He is the top ranked chess player of Turkey. Ipatov was world junior champion in 2012 and Turkish champion in 2014 and 2015. Since 2012, he has played for the Turkish national team in the Chess Olympiad, World Team Chess Championship and European Team Chess Championship.

== Early years ==
Ipatov was born on July 16, 1993, in Lviv, Ukraine. His father taught him how to play chess when he was four, and his mother brought him to the local chess club at the age of six. He trained there for four years.

== Chess career ==
In March, 2003, Ipatov became the under-10 vice-champion of Ukraine. This made him eligible to participate in the World Youth Chess Championship (U10 section), which took place in Greece. Ipatov finished in 11th place out of 133 players. In 2007, he finished second in the under-14 Ukrainian championship, and therefore qualified for the world U14 championship in Turkey, where he finished in 8th place, entering the top 10 for the first time.

In 2008, Ipatov gained 207 Elo rating points, became twice vice-champion of Ukraine (U16 and U20), and was awarded the titles of National Master and International Master (IM). From January 2009 to February 2012, he represented Spain.

In 2011, Ipatov finished third in the Cappelle-la-Grande Open, where 573 players competed in, of which 85 were grandmasters. Since February 2012, Alexander Ipatov has represented the Turkish Chess Federation. In August 2012, he won the World Junior Chess Championship in Athens ahead of Ding Liren, Richárd Rapport, Yu Yangyi and Wei Yi. This achievement made him eligible to participate in the 2013 FIDE World Cup. In the latter he was knocked out in the first round by Wesley So.

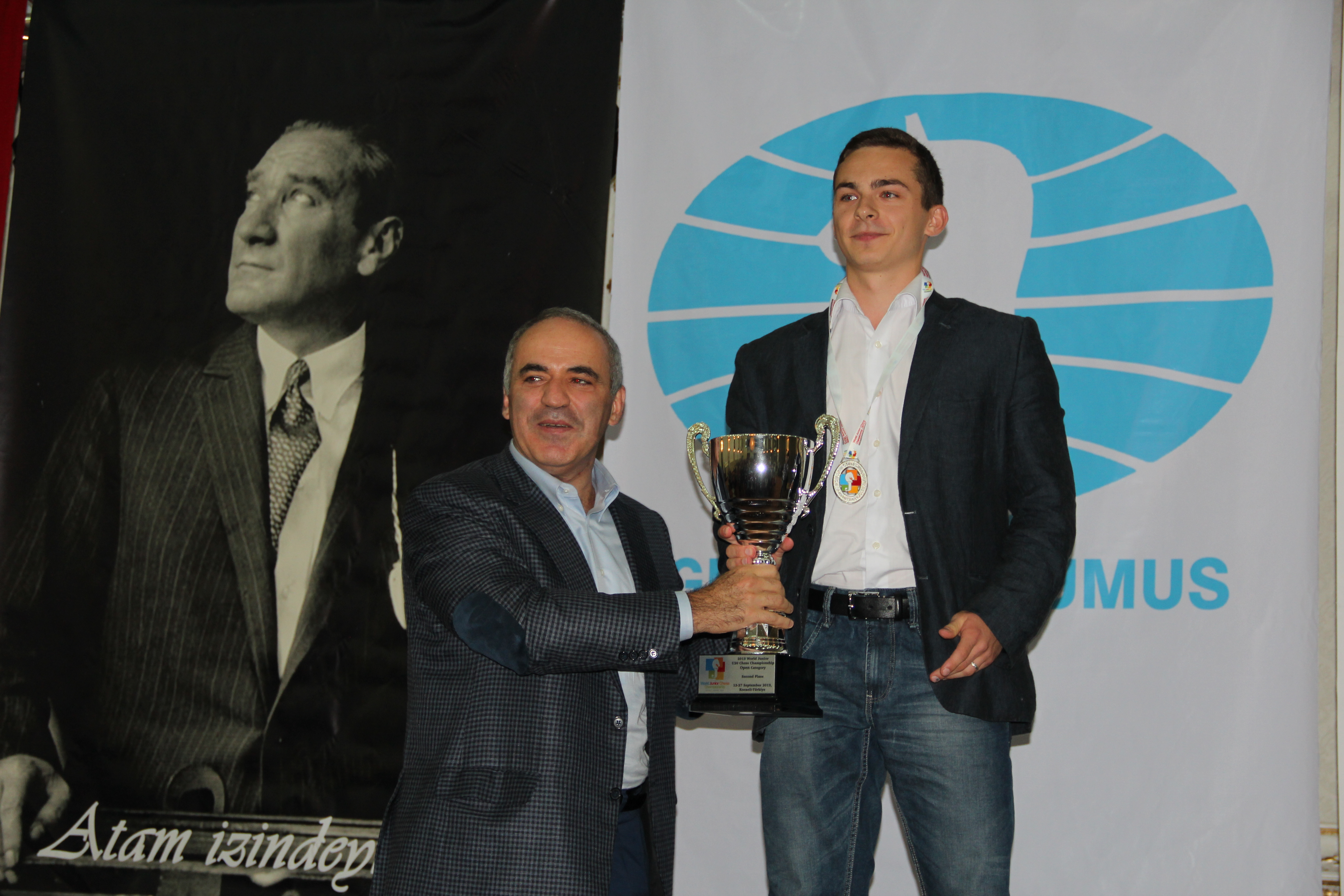
Garry Kasparov gives Alex Ipatov his reward at the 2013 World Junior Championship

In February 2013, he took the bronze medal in the Turkish Chess Championship. In September 2013, he won the silver medal at the World Junior Chess Championship in Kocaeli scoring 10.5 points out of 13, half a point behind the winner, Yu Yangyi. Alexander Ipatov became Turkish champion in 2014 and 2015.

In March 2015, he finished 7th at the European Individual Chess Championship and as a result qualified for the FIDE World Cup in Baku. In this latter event, held later in September 2015, he knocked out Ivan Cheparinov in round one to progress to round two, where he was knocked out by Pavel Eljanov. In September 2016, at the 42nd Chess Olympiad in Baku, Ipatov helped the Turkish team to finish sixth, Turkey's highest rank ever in a Chess Olympiad, by defeating the Georgian Grandmaster Mikheil Mchedlishvili in the last round, when the score in the match was 1.5-1.5.

== Education ==
Ipatov attained his bachelor's degree from the National University “Yaroslav the Wise Law Academy of Ukraine” in Kharkiv in 2014. He is fluent in Russian, Ukrainian, Spanish, English and Turkish. In addition to this educational attainment in 2014, between 2017 and 2021 he graduated from Saint Louis University in Missouri, and was a member of their highly-regarded student chess team. He is the author of two books published by Thinkers Publishing: Unconventional Approaches to Modern Chess, Volume 1: Rare Ideas for Black (2019) and Unconventional Approaches to Modern Chess, Volume 2: Rare Ideas for White (2020).

== Chess clubs ==
Alexander Ipatov has played for the following chess clubs in various international leagues throughout his career :

- 2016 – Deniz Su Aquamatch Satranç Gençlik ve Spor Kulübü (Turkey)
- 2012 – Bois Colombes (France)
- 2012 – 2012 Niš (Serbia)
- 2011 – 2015 İstanbul Teknik Üniversitesi Spor Kulübü (Turkey)
- 2011 – 2016 SK Turm Emsdetten (Germany)
- 2010 – 2014 Law Academy Chess Club (Ukraine)
- 2007 – Club d’Escacs Barberà (Spain)

== Notable games ==
- Ipatov vs Sergei Zhigalko, 27th Cappelle-la-Grande (2011), Queen's Indian Defense: Fianchetto. Nimzowitsch Variation Timman's Line
- Nils Grandelius versus Ipatov, World Junior Championship (2012), Indian Game: Anti-Nimzo-Indian (E10)
- Ipatov versus Sergey Volkov, Moscow Open (2010), Semi-Slav Defense: Anti-Noteboom. Stonewall Variation Portisch Gambit (D31)
