= Dragan Šolak (chess player) =

Turkish-Serbian chess grandmaster (born 1980)

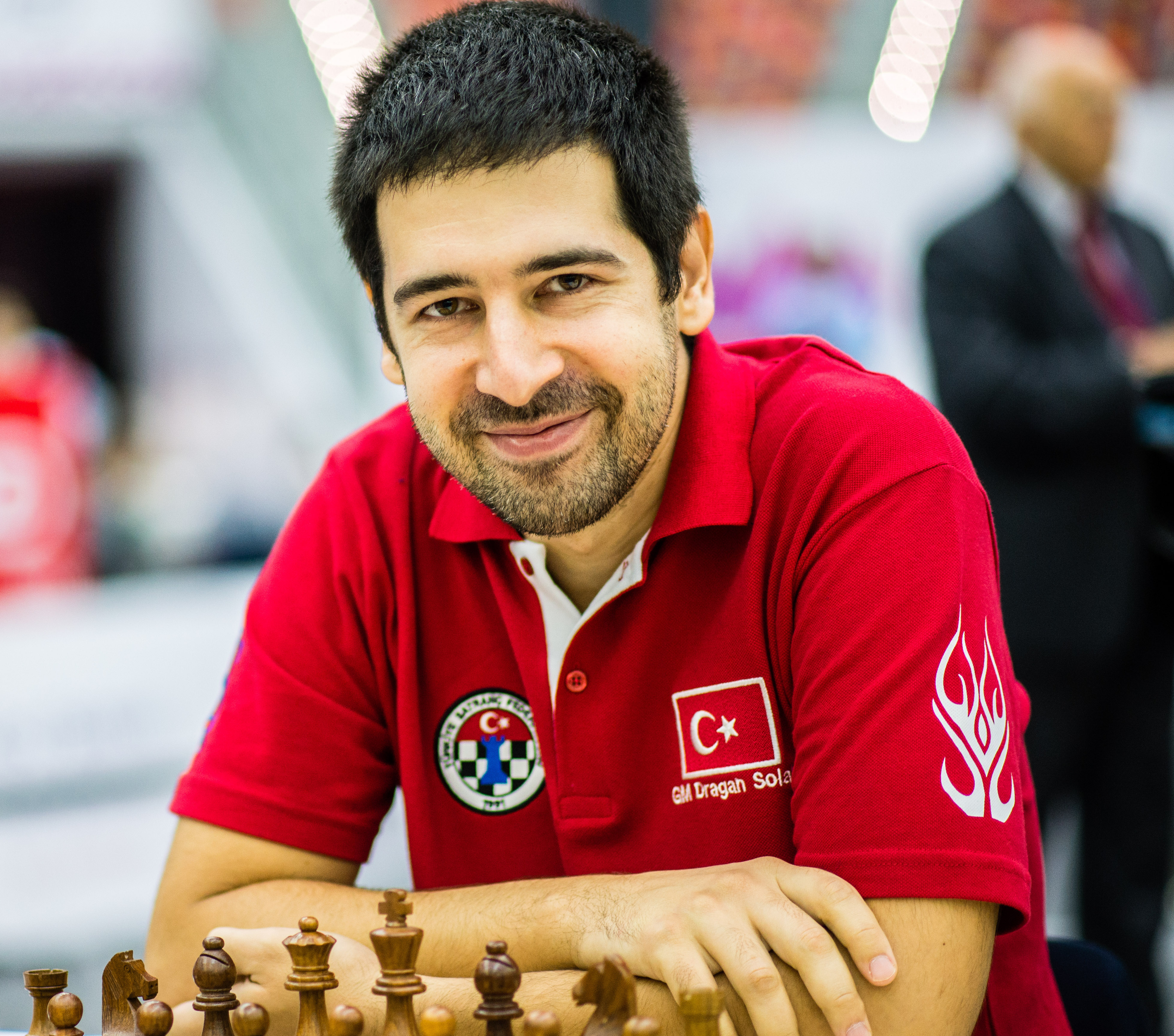
- Dragan Šolak, Baku 2016

Personal information
- Born: 30 March 1980 (age 46) Vrbas, SR Serbia, Yugoslavia

Chess career
- Country: Yugoslavia → Serbia (until 2011); Turkey (since 2011)
- Title: Grandmaster (2001)
- FIDE rating: 2588 (July 2026)
- Peak rating: 2641 (November 2016)
- Peak ranking: No. 95 (April 2008)

Dragan Šolak (Serbian: Драган Шолак; born 30 March 1980) is a Turkish-Serbian chess grandmaster.

== Career ==
Šolak learnt chess from a very young age and started participating in tournaments before he turned four years of age. In 2002 he tied for 1st–3rd with Vladimir Tukmakov and Andrei Sokolov in the Hilton Open in Basel and tied for 3rd–4th with Ketino Kachiani-Gersinska in the Casino Open in Interlaken. In 2011 he tied for 3rd–7th with Sergey Volkov, Ioannis Nikolaidis, Konstantine Shanava and Fernando Peralta in the 1st Isthmia International Tournament.

He played for the Yugoslav (later Serbian) national team in the Chess Olympiads of 2000, 2004, 2008 and in the European Team Chess Championships of 1999, 2005, 2009 and 2011.

In December 2011 he transferred to the Turkish Chess Federation. Šolak represented Turkey at the Chess Olympiads of 2012, 2014, 2016 and at the European Team Championship of 2013. He won the Turkish Chess Championship in 2012 and 2013.

Šolak finished equal second (fourth on tiebreak) at the 2014 European Individual Chess Championship, scoring 8/11, and qualifying for the 2015 Chess World Cup. In 2015, he won the Dubai Open, edging out the other five grandmasters on tiebreak, after all finished on 7/9 points. At the Chess World Cup 2015 he was eliminated in the first round by Anton Korobov.

His handle on the Internet Chess Club is "RuznaMamuna".
