= Igor Kovalenko =

Ukrainian chess grandmaster (born 1988)

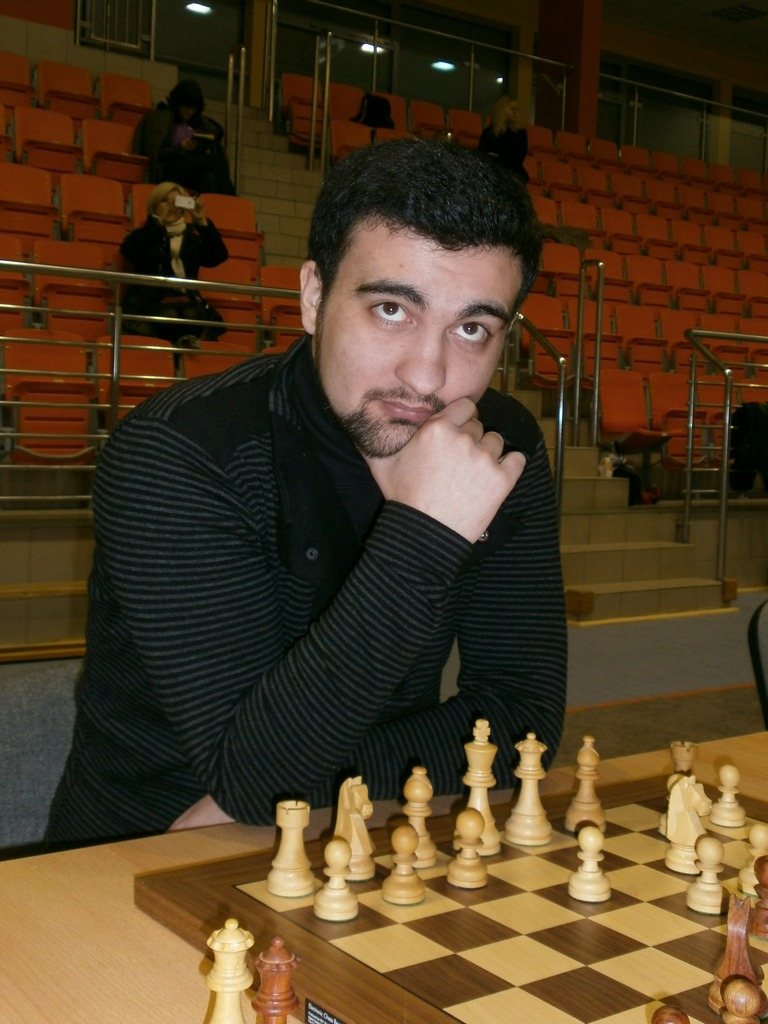
- Kovalenko in Trzcianka, 2013

Personal information
- Born: Igor Viktorovich Kovalenko; 29 December 1988 (age 37) Novomoskovsk, Dnipropetrovsk Oblast, Ukrainian SSR, Soviet Union

Chess career
- Country: Ukraine (until 2013, since 2021); Latvia (2013–2021)
- Title: Grandmaster (2011)
- FIDE rating: 2672 (July 2026)
- Peak rating: 2702 (August 2015)
- Ranking: No. 45 (July 2026)
- Peak ranking: No. 39 (November 2025)

Igor Viktorovich Kovalenko (Ukrainian: Ігор Вікторович Коваленко; Latvian: Igors Kovaļenko; born 29 December 1988, Novomoskovsk) is a Ukrainian chess player who played for Latvia between 2013 and 2021 and holds the FIDE title of Grandmaster (GM). In the light of the Russian invasion of Ukraine, Kovalenko has been putting his chess activities mostly on hold and is instead fighting for his country as part of the Armed Forces of Ukraine.

== Career ==
Kovalenko was awarded the titles of International Master (IM) in 2008 and Grandmaster (GM) in 2011. He won the Latvian Chess Championship in 2013 and 2014. In 2016, Kovalenko came second in the European Individual Chess Championship in Gjakova (Kosovo). In 2019, he won the Riga Technical University Open.

Igor Kovalenko played for Latvia in Chess Olympiads:

- in 2014, at the second board in the 41st Chess Olympiad in Tromsø (+5 −2 =4),
- in 2016, at the second board in the 42nd Chess Olympiad in Baku (+6 −1 =4),
- in 2018, at the first board in the 43rd Chess Olympiad in Batumi (+6 −3 =0).

Igor Kovalenko played for Latvia in the European Team Chess Championship:

- in 2015, at the second board in Reykjavík (+3 −1 =3).

Igor Kovalenko played for Ukraine in the European Team Chess Championship:

- in 2025, at the fourth board in Batumi (+5 −0 =3). He became European champion as a member of the Ukrainian national team (open section), and achieved first place among the players on the fourth board.
