= Chess World Cup 2021 =

Chess tournament in Sochi, Russia

FIDE Chess World Cup 2021
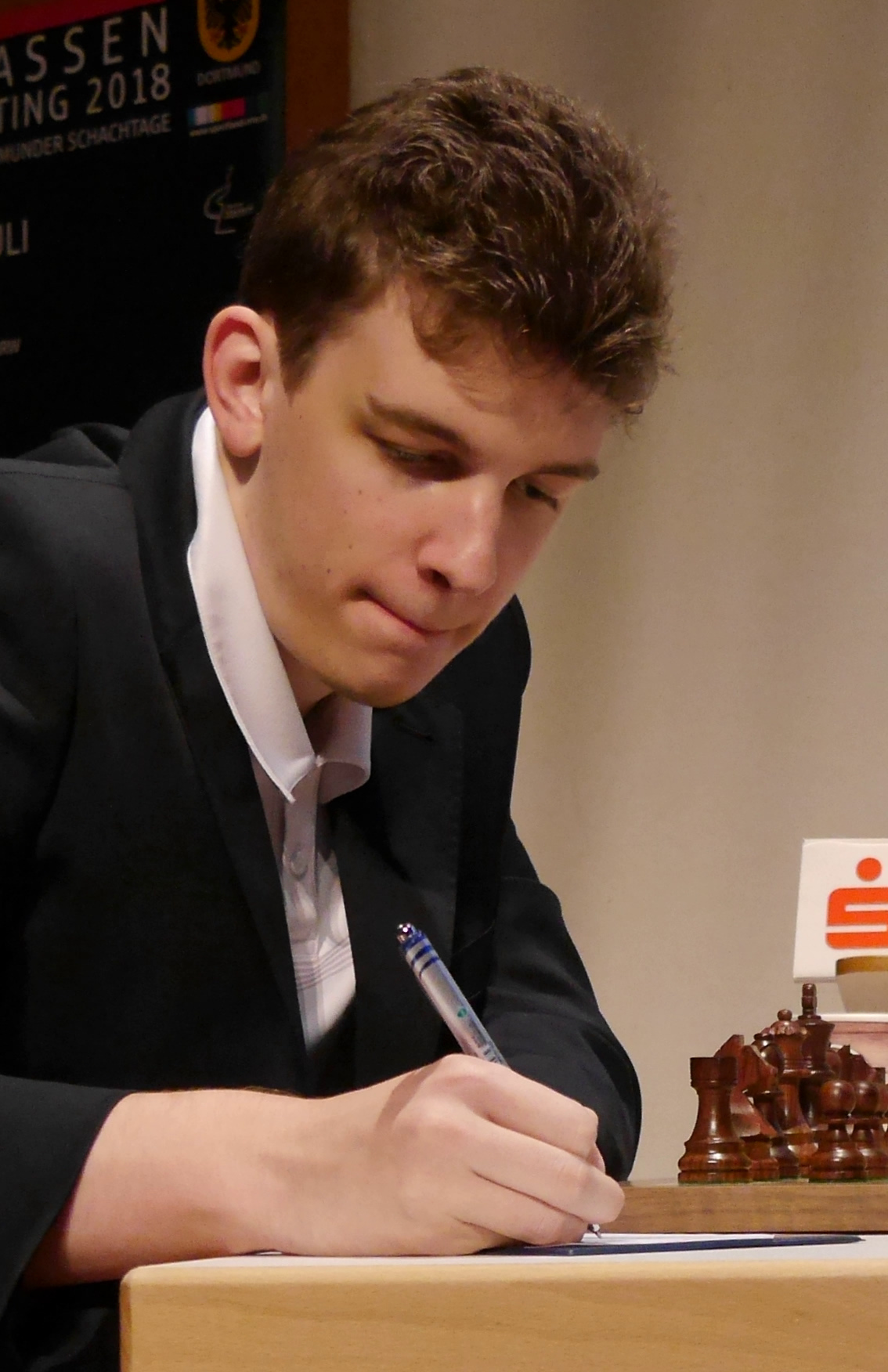
- Jan-Krzysztof Duda, the winner of the 2021 FIDE World Cup.

Tournament information
- Sport: Chess
- Location: Sochi, Russia
- Dates: 12 July 2021–6 August 2021
- Administrator: FIDE
- Tournament format: Single-elimination tournament
- Host: Chess Federation of Russia

Final positions
- Champion: (Poland) Jan-Krzysztof Duda
- Runner-up: (Russia) Sergey Karjakin
- 3rd place: (Norway) Magnus Carlsen

The Chess World Cup 2021 was a 206-player single-elimination chess tournament that took place in Sochi, Russia, beginning 12 July and ending 6 August 2021. It was the 9th edition of the Chess World Cup. The winner of this tournament was the Polish grandmaster Jan-Krzysztof Duda, who won without losing any games either in classical chess or in the rapid tiebreakers.

The two finalists (Duda and Sergey Karjakin) qualified for the Candidates Tournament 2022. The rest of the final eight, except Magnus Carlsen, qualified for the FIDE Grand Prix 2022.

In parallel with this open tournament, an inaugural women-only version was held.

== Format ==
The tournament was an 8-round knockout event, with the top 50 seeds given a bye directly into the second round. The losers of the two semi-finals played a match for third place.

The two finalists, Jan-Krzysztof Duda and Sergey Karjakin qualified for the Candidates Tournament 2022, which is a tournament to decide the next challenger for the World Championship. Moreover, all quarter-finalists, except for World Champion Magnus Carlsen, qualified for the FIDE Grand Prix 2022, giving them another chance to qualify for the Candidates.

Each round consisted of classical time limit games on the first two days, plus tie-breaks on the third day if required. The time limits were as follows:

- Two classical time limit games: 90 minutes, plus a 30-minute increment on move 40, plus a 30-second increment per move from move 1, per player.
- If the match was tied after the classical games, players played two rapid chess games, with 25 minutes plus a 10-second increment per move, per player.
- If the match was still tied, players then played two more rapid chess games, with 10 minutes plus a 10-second increment per move, per player.
- If the match was still tied, players then played two blitz games, with 5 minutes plus a 3-second increment per move, per player.
- If the match was still tied, a single armageddon chess game was played to decide the match, with draw odds to Black, meaning White had to win but Black only needed to draw or win, to win the match. The players drew lots and the winner of the draw chose their color. White received 5 minutes, Black received 4 minutes, and each player received an extra 2 seconds per move beginning at move 61.

=== Schedule ===
Each round lasted three days: two for classical time limit games and a third, if necessary, for tie-breaks. Rounds 1 to 3 ran from 12 to 20 July; 21 July was a rest day; Rounds 4 to 6 ran from 22 to 30 July; 31 July was a rest day; and the last two rounds ran from 1 to 6 August.

Play began at 3:00 pm local time (12:00 UTC) on all days.

=== Prize money ===
The total prize fund was US$1,892,500, with the first prize of US$110,000.

Prize money in US dollars
Round	Prizes	Total
Round 1	78 × 3,750	292,500
Round 2	64 × 6,000	384,000
Round 3	32 × 10,000	320,000
Round 4	16 × 16,000	256,000
Round 5	8 × 25,000	200,000
Round 6	4 × 35,000	140,000
4th place	1 × 50,000	50,000
3rd place	1 × 60,000	60,000
Runner-up	1 × 80,000	80,000
Winner	1 × 110,000	110,000
Total		1,892,500

=== Media ===
IM Eric Rosen was one of the official photographers for the event.

== Participants ==
The following is the list of participants. Players were seeded by their FIDE rating of June 2021, and all players were grandmasters unless indicated otherwise.

Click on the seed number of a player to go to their draw section.

1. Magnus Carlsen (NOR), 2847 (World Champion)
2. Fabiano Caruana (USA), 2820 (R)
3. Levon Aronian (ARM), 2781 (R)
4. Anish Giri (NED), 2780 (R)
5. Alexander Grischuk (RUS), 2776 (R)
6. Shakhriyar Mamedyarov (AZE), 2770 (R)
7. Maxime Vachier-Lagrave (FRA), 2760 (WC)
8. Alireza Firouzja (FRA), 2759 (R)
9. Leinier Domínguez (USA), 2758 (R)
10. Sergey Karjakin (RUS), 2757 (R)
11. Pentala Harikrishna (IND), 2730 (R)
12. Jan-Krzysztof Duda (POL), 2729 (ER)
13. Vidit Gujrathi (IND), 2726 (R)
14. Dmitry Andreikin (RUS), 2724 (ER)
15. Nikita Vitiugov (RUS), 2724 (ER)
16. Andrey Esipenko (RUS), 2716 (E)
17. Daniil Dubov (RUS), 2714 (ER)
18. Peter Svidler (RUS), 2714 (ER)
19. Francisco Vallejo Pons (ESP), 2710 (ER)
20. Jeffery Xiong (USA), 2709 (Z2.1)
21. Evgeny Tomashevsky (RUS), 2706 (E)
22. Yu Yangyi (CHN), 2705 (WC)
23. Vladislav Artemiev (RUS), 2704 (E)
24. Bassem Amin (EGY), 2703 (AF)
25. Jorden van Foreest (NED), 2701 (R)
26. Kirill Alekseenko (RUS), 2699 (ER)
27. Yuriy Kryvoruchko (UKR), 2699 (ER)
28. Parham Maghsoodloo (IRI), 2698 (AS)
29. David Navara (CZE), 2697 (ER)
30. Vladimir Fedoseev (RUS), 2696 (E)
31. Sam Shankland (USA), 2691 (Z2.1)
32. Maxim Matlakov (RUS), 2688 (E)
33. Radosław Wojtaszek (POL), 2687 (ER)
34. Alexander Areshchenko (UKR), 2687 (R)
35. Dmitry Jakovenko (RUS), 2684 (R)
36. Alexandr Predke (RUS), 2683 (E)
37. Anton Korobov (UKR), 2683 (R)
38. Salem Saleh (UAE), 2682 (R)
39. Gabriel Sargissian (ARM), 2682 (FN)
40. Markus Ragger (AUT), 2680 (FN)
41. Étienne Bacrot (FRA), 2678 (FN)
42. Boris Gelfand (ISR), 2675 (R)
43. Ferenc Berkes (HUN), 2673 (FN)
44. David Antón Guijarro (ESP), 2673 (E)
45. Nils Grandelius (SWE), 2670 (FN)
46. Matthias Blübaum (GER), 2669 (FN)
47. Ivan Cheparinov (BUL), 2667 (E)
48. Vladimir Malakhov (RUS), 2666 (R)
49. Nijat Abasov (AZE), 2665 (PN)
50. Alexei Shirov (ESP), 2662 (FN)
51. Sanan Sjugirov (RUS), 2661 (E)
52. Baskaran Adhiban (IND), 2660 (FN)
53. Samuel Sevian (USA), 2660 (Z2.1)
54. Constantin Lupulescu (ROM), 2656 (E)
55. Grigoriy Oparin (RUS), 2654 (E)
56. Yuri Kuzubov (UKR), 2653 (FN)
57. Jorge Cori (PER), 2652 (Z2.4)
58. Alexander Onischuk (USA), 2649 (Z2.1)
59. Haik M. Martirosyan (ARM), 2648 (E)
60. Ivan Šarić (CRO), 2645 (FN)
61. Aravindh Chithambaram (IND), 2641 (Z3.7)
62. Alexey Sarana (RUS), 2640 (PN)
63. Alexander Motylev (RUS), 2639 (E)
64. Aryan Tari (NOR), 2639 (FN)
65. Evgeny Bareev (CAN), 2638 (Z2.2)
66. Rinat Jumabayev (KAZ), 2637 (FN)
67. Vladislav Kovalev (FIDE), 2637 (PN)
68. Nodirbek Abdusattorov (UZB), 2634 (Z3.4)
69. Alan Pichot (ARG), 2630 (FN)
70. Mustafa Yılmaz (TUR), 2630 (E)
71. David Paravyan (RUS), 2629 (PN)
72. Sandro Mareco (ARG), 2629 (AM)
73. Pavel Ponkratov (RUS), 2627 (E)
74. Bogdan-Daniel Deac (ROM), 2627 (E)
75. Ahmed Adly (EGY), 2625 (AF)
76. Benjamin Bok (NED), 2624 (FN)
77. Neuris Delgado Ramírez (PAR), 2622 (Z2.5)
78. Nihal Sarin (IND), 2620 (PN)
79. Yaroslav Zherebukh (USA), 2620 (FN)
80. Shant Sargsyan (ARM), 2618 (E)
81. Daniele Vocaturo (ITA), 2617 (FN)
82. Rasmus Svane (GER), 2615 (E)
83. Viktor Erdős (HUN), 2614 (E)
84. Varuzhan Akobian (USA), 2614 (PN)
85. Pouya Idani (IRI), 2614 (FN)
86. Amin Tabatabaei (IRI), 2613 (AS)
87. Arik Braun (GER), 2609 (E)
88. Vadim Zvjaginsev (RUS), 2608 (E)
89. Kacper Piorun (POL), 2608 (FN)
90. R Praggnanandhaa (IND), 2608 (PN)
91. Aleksandar Inđić (SRB), 2607 (E)
92. Cristobal Henriquez Villagra (CHI), 2606 (AM)
93. Vasif Durarbayli (AZE), 2606 (FN)
94. Timur Gareyev (USA), 2606 (Z2.1)
95. Ivan Ivanišević (SRB), 2606 (E)
96. Evgeny Alekseev (RUS), 2605 (E)
97. Hjorvar Steinn Gretarsson (ISL), 2603 (FN)
98. Baadur Jobava (GEO), 2603 (E)
99. Axel Bachmann (PAR), 2599 (AM)
100. Nodirbek Yakubboev (UZB), 2598 (Z3.4)
101. Kiril Georgiev (MKD), 2594 (FN)
102. Ante Brkić (CRO), 2592 (E)
103. Michał Krasenkow (POL), 2591 (E)
104. Mircea Pârligras (ROM), 2591 (FN)
105. Hovhannes Gabuzyan (ARM), 2590 (E)
106. Viorel Iordăchescu (MDA), 2589 (FN)
107. Denis Kadrić (BIH), 2586 (PN)
108. Sebastian Bogner (SUI), 2581 (FN)
109. Victor Mikhalevski (ISR), 2581 (FN)
110. Velimir Ivić (SRB), 2581 (FN)
111. Mads Andersen (DEN), 2579 (FN)
112. Gukesh D (IND), 2578 (PN)
113. Thai Dai Van Nguyen (CZE), 2577 (E)
114. Carlos Daniel Albornoz Cabrera (CUB), 2573 (Z2.3)
115. Emre Can (TUR), 2569 (E)
116. Alexandr Fier (BRA), 2569 (FN)
117. Nikita Meshkovs (LAT), 2568 (FN)
118. Yasser Quesada Pérez (CUB), 2565 (FN)
119. Luka Paichadze (GEO), 2564 (E)
120. Levan Pantsulaia (GEO), 2564 (FN)
121. Javokhir Sindarov (UZB), 2558 (AS)
122. Elshan Moradiabadi (USA), 2555 (AM)
123. Krikor Mekhitarian (BRA), 2554 (AM)
124. Federico Perez Ponsa (ARG), 2554 (Z2.5)
125. Boris Savchenko (RUS), 2553 (E)
126. Bobby Cheng (AUS), 2552 (FN)
127. Susanto Megaranto (INA), 2550 (FN)
128. Saša Martinović (CRO), 2548 (E)
129. Kaido Kulaots (EST), 2548 (FN)
130. Ehsan Ghaem Maghami (IRI), 2547 (Z3.1)
131. Vahap Şanal (TUR), 2546 (FN)
132. Nikita Afanasiev (RUS), 2542 (E)
133. Momchil Nikolov (BUL), 2542 (FN)
134. Juan Carlos González Zamora (MEX), 2540 (FN)
135. Helgi Dam Ziska (FRO), 2539 (Z1.10)
136. Andrew Tang (USA), 2538 (AM)
137. Jahongir Vakhidov (UZB), 2534 (FN)
138. Shamsiddin Vokhidov (UZB), 2530 (AS)
139. Leandro Krysa (ARG), 2527 (AM)
140. Guillermo Vázquez, IM (PAR), 2527 (FN)
141. Jerguš Pecháč (SVK), 2523 (PN)
142. Darcy Lima (BRA), 2522 (Z2.4)
143. Vojtěch Plát (CZE), 2521 (FN)
144. Ádám Kozák (HUN), 2518 (E)
145. Paweł Teclaf, IM (POL), 2514 (E)
146. Pablo Salinas Herrera (CHI), 2514 (FN)
147. Robert Hungaski (USA), 2514 (AM)
148. Wynn Zaw Htun, IM (MYA), 2508 (FN)
149. P. Iniyan (IND), 2506 (IAS)
150. Dambasuren Batsuren (MGL), 2504 (FN)
151. Volodar Murzin, IM (RUS), 2502 (FN)
152. Bilel Bellahcene (ALG), 2499 (FN)
153. Juraj Druska, IM (SVK), 2493 (FN)
154. Matej Šebenik (SLO), 2492 (FN)
155. Sergio Barrientos (COL), 2490 (Z2.3)
156. Alexandre Dgebuadze (BEL), 2488 (FN)
157. Razvan Preotu (CAN), 2487 (FN)
158. Kirill Shubin, IM (RUS), 2486 (ON)
159. Abhimanyu Mishra (USA), 2485 (PN)
160. Kirill Stupak (BLR), 2485 (FN)
161. Adham Fawzy (EGY), 2485 (AF)
162. Andrés Rodríguez Vila (URU), 2484 (FN)
163. Tin Jingyao, IM (SGP), 2482 (AS)
164. Dmitry V. Sklyarov, IM (FIN), 2480 (FN)
165. Goh Wei Ming (SGP), 2478 (FN)
166. Luka Drašković, IM (MNE), 2469 (FN)
167. Paulo Bersamina, IM (PHI), 2462 (FN)
168. Rudik Makarian, IM (RUS), 2460 (ON)
169. Ravi Haria, IM (ENG), 2440 (FN)
170. Karolis Jukšta, FM (LTU), 2438 (FN)
171. Basheer Al Qudaimi, IM (YEM), 2435 (FN)
172. Ziaur Rahman, GM (BAN), 2434 (Z3.2)
173. Esteban Valderrama Quiceno, IM (COL), 2430 (FN)
174. Saparmyrat Atabayev, IM (TKM), 2425 (FN)
175. Essam El Gindy (EGY), 2420 (FN)
176. Sugar Gan-Erdene, IM (MGL), 2419 (AS)
177. Pedro Ramón Martínez Reyes, FM (VEN), 2417 (FN)
178. Evgenios Ioannidis, IM (GRE), 2411 (FN)
179. Arthur Ssegwanyi, IM (UGA), 2409 (FN)
180. Niaz Murshed (BAN), 2404 (FN)
181. Asyl Abdyjapar, IM (KGZ), 2403 (FN)
182. Abdelrahman Hesham (EGY), 2397 (AF)
183. Amir Zaibi (TUN), 2396 (FN)
184. André Ventura Sousa, IM (POR), 2390 (FN)
185. Sami Khader, IM (JOR), 2382 (FN)
186. Mohamed Tissir, IM (MAR), 2379 (FN)
187. Noaman Omar, IM (UAE), 2367 (FN)
188. Sergio Minero Pineda, IM (CRC), 2365 (FN)
189. Mohamad Ervan, IM (INA), 2356 (AS)
190. Rodwell Makoto, IM (ZIM), 2352 (FN)
191. Bashir Eiti, IM (SYR), 2340 (FN)
192. Daniel Quizon, IM (PHI), 2319 (Z3.3)
193. Daniel Barrish, FM (RSA), 2313 (FN)
194. Abobker Mohamed Elarabi, FM (LBA), 2307 (FN)
195. Olanrewaju Ajibola, no title (NGR), 2302 (FN)
196. Michael Concio, IM (PHI), 2297 (Z3.3)
197. Sergio Miguel, FM (ANG), 2286 (FN)
198. Chitumbo Mwali, IM (ZAM), 2281 (FN)
199. Akar Ali Salih Salih, FM (IRQ), 2274 (FN)
200. Alisher Karimov, FM (TJK), 2244 (FN)
201. Antoine Kassis, FM (LBN), 2205 (FN)
202. Ranindu Dilshan Liyanage, CM (SRI), 2203 (FN)
203. Allen Chi Zhou Fan, FM (NZL), 2193 (FN)
204. Sumant Subramaniam, FM (MAS), 2155 (FN)
205. Chiletso Chipanga, CM (MWI), 2103 (PN)
206. Elmer Prudente, CM (GUM), 1998 (Z3.6)

Players qualifying for the event included:

- The world chess champion
- The women's world chess champion (WWC)
- The 2019 World Junior Champion U20 (U20)
- The top four players in the Chess World Cup 2019 (WC)
- 89 players qualifying from Continental events:
  - Europe (47): High rating (ER, 10), Hybrid qualification (E, 36), Zonal 1.10 (Z1.10, 1)
  - America (11+9): Hybrid qualification (AM, 8), Zonals 2.1 (Z2.1, 5), 2.2 (Z2.2, 1), 2.3 (Z2.3, 2), 2.4 (Z2.4, 2), 2.5 (Z2.5, 2)
  - Asia (18): Hybrid Asian Championship 2021 (AS, 7), Indian Qualification (IAS, 1), Zonals 3.1 (Z3.1, 1), 3.2 (Z3.2, 1), 3.3 (Z3.3, 2), 3.4 (Z3.4, 2), 3.5 (Z3.5, 2), 3.6 (Z3.6, 1), 3.7 (Z3.7, 1)
  - Africa (4): African Chess Championship (AF, 4)
- The 13 highest-rated players from the average of 12 rating lists, from July 2020 to June 2021 (R)
- 91 federations spots selected according to the average rating of their 10 highest rated players (FN).
- 4 nominees of the FIDE President (PN)
- 2 nominees of the organizer (ON)

The participants were seeded by their FIDE rating of June 2021. For the first time, a hybrid format of online chess under arbiter supervision was allowed to be a part of the qualification process, due to the difficulties caused by the COVID-19 pandemic in organizing over the board competition.

=== Replacements ===
The following are the players from the list of qualifiers who declined to play, and their replacements:

- Teimour Radjabov (AZE) (WC) → Boris Gelfand (ISR) (R). Radjabov already had a wildcard placement for the 2022 Candidates.
- Ding Liren (CHN) (WC) → Anton Korobov (UKR) (R). Ding Liren did not play because of China's COVID-19 travel restrictions, and also because he was committed to playing in a Chinese tournament.
- Evgeny Shtembuliak (UKR) (U20) → Vladimir Malakhov (RUS) (R)
- Ju Wenjun (CHN) (WWC) → Dmitry Jakovenko (RUS) (R)
- Ian Nepomniachtchi (RUS) (R) → Pentala Harikrishna (IND) (R). Nepomniachtchi was preparing for the World Chess Championship 2021 match against Carlsen.
- Wesley So (USA) (R) → Vidit Gujrathi (IND) (R). COVID-19 reasons.
- Richárd Rapport (HUN) (R) → Alexander Areshchenko (UKR) (R)
- Wang Hao (CHN) (R) → Salem Saleh (UAE) (R). Wang Hao had retired from competitive chess.
- Viswanathan Anand (IND) (R) → Jorden van Foreest (NED) (R). Anand was already committed to playing the Dortmund Sparkassen Chess Meeting between July 10 and 18.
- Lu Shanglei (CHN) (AS) → Parham Maghsoodloo (IRI) (AS)
- Veselin Topalov (BUL) (ER) → Kirill Alekseenko (RUS) (ER)
- Michael Adams (ENG) (ER) → Yuriy Kryvoruchko (UKR) (ER)
- Viktor Láznička (CZE) (E) → Viktor Erdős (HUN) (E)
- Michael Wiedenkeller (LUX) (Z1.10) → Helgi Dam Ziska (FRO) (Z1.10)
- Temur Kuybokarov (AUS) (Z3.6) → Elmer Prudente (GUM) (Z3.6). Kuybokarov withdrew due to Australian travel restrictions due to COVID-19.
- Huang Renjie (CHN) (Z3.5) → an extra presidential nominee (PN)
- Bai Jinshi (CHN) (Z3.5) → an extra presidential nominee (PN)

In addition, six federations (Bosnia and Herzegovina, China, Japan, South Korea, Peru, Vietnam) did not nominate a player. Because of this and the two Zone 3.5 withdrawals, the number of presidential nominees (PN) increased from four to twelve, with the eight extra being:

- Varuzhan Akobian (USA) (PN)
- Chiletso Chipanga (MAW) (PN)
- Denis Kadrić (BIH) (PN)
- Rameshbabu Praggnanandhaa (IND) (PN)
- Alexey Sarana (RUS) (PN)
- David Paravyan (RUS) (PN)
- Nihal Sarin (IND) (PN)
- Abhimanyu Mishra (USA) (PN)

== Rounds 1–4 ==
=== Section 1 ===
First round
1	(Norway) M Carlsen	Bye
-	Bye 1
128	(Croatia) S Martinović	1½
129	(Estonia) K Kulaots	½
65	(Canada) E Bareev	1½
192	(Philippines) D Quizon	½
64	(Norway) A Tari	2
193	(South Africa) D Barrish	0
33	(Poland) R Wojtaszek	Bye
-	Bye 33
96	(Russia) E Alekseev	2½
161	(Egypt) A Fawzy	1½
97	(Iceland) HS Gretarsson	2½
160	(Belarus) K Stupak	1½
32	(Russia) M Matlakov	Bye
-	Bye 32

Second round
1	(Norway) M Carlsen	2
128	(Croatia) S Martinović	0
65	(Canada) E Bareev	½
64	(Norway) A Tari	1½
33	(Poland) R Wojtaszek	1½
96	(Russia) E Alekseev	½
97	(Iceland) HS Gretarsson	½
32	(Russia) M Matlakov	1½

Third round
1	(Norway) M Carlsen	2
64	(Norway) A Tari	0
33	(Poland) R Wojtaszek	3
32	(Russia) M Matlakov	1

Fourth round
1	(Norway) M Carlsen	2½
33	(Poland) R Wojtaszek	1½

=== Section 2 ===
First round
17	(Russia) D Dubov	Bye
Bye 17
112	(India) Gukesh D	2½
145	(Poland) P Teclaf	1½
81	(Italy) D Vocaturo	1½
176	(Mongolia) S Gan-Erdene	½
48	(Russia) V Malakhov	Bye
-	Bye 48
49	(Azerbaijan) N Abasov	Bye
-	Bye 49
80	(Armenia) S Sargsyan	2
177	(Venezuela) P Martínez Reyes	0
113	(Czech Republic) TDV Nguyen	1½
144	(Hungary) A Kozák	½
16	(Russia) A Esipenko	Bye
-	Bye 16

Second round
17	(Russia) D Dubov	2½
112	(India) Gukesh D	1½
81	(Italy) D Vocaturo	½
48	(Russia) V Malakhov	1½
49	(Azerbaijan) N Abasov	2½
80	(Armenia) S Sargsyan	1½
113	(Czech Republic) TDV Nguyen	1½
16	(Russia) A Esipenko	2½

Third round
17	(Russia) D Dubov	1½
48	(Russia) V Malakhov	½
49	(Azerbaijan) N Abasov	½
16	(Russia) A Esipenko	1½

Fourth round
17	(Russia) D Dubov	2½
16	(Russia) A Esipenko	3½

=== Section 3 ===
First round
9	(United States) L Domínguez	Bye
-	Bye 9
120	(Georgia (country)) L Pantsulaia	½
137	(Uzbekistan) J Vakhidov	1½
73	(Russia) P Ponkratov	1½
184	(Portugal) A Ventura Sousa	½
56	(Ukraine) Y Kuzubov	2
201	(Lebanon) A Kassis	0
41	(France) É Bacrot	Bye
-	Bye 41
88	(Russia) V Zvjaginsev	1
169	(England) R Haria	3
105	(Armenia) H Gabuzyan	3
152	(Algeria) B Bellahcene	1
24	(Egypt) B Amin	Bye
-	Bye 24

Second round
9	(United States) L Domínguez	1
137	(Uzbekistan) J Vakhidov	3
73	(Russia) P Ponkratov	1½
56	(Ukraine) Y Kuzubov	½
41	(France) É Bacrot	2½
169	(England) R Haria	1½
105	(Armenia) H Gabuzyan	½
24	(Egypt) B Amin	1½

Third round
137	(Uzbekistan) J Vakhidov	1
73	(Russia) P Ponkratov	3
41	(France) É Bacrot	2½
24	(Egypt) B Amin	1½

Fourth round
73	(Russia) P Ponkratov	1½
41	(France) É Bacrot	2½

=== Section 4 ===
First round
25	(Netherlands) J van Foreest	Bye
-	Bye 25
104	(Romania) M Pârligras	½
153	(Slovakia) J Druska	1½
89	(Poland) K Piorun	1½
168	(Russia) R Makarian	½
40	(Austria) M Ragger	Bye
-	Bye 40
57	(Peru) J Cori	1½
200	(Tajikistan) A Karimov	½
72	(Argentina) S Mareco	2
185	(Jordan) S Khader	0
121	(Uzbekistan) J Sindarov	1½
136	(United States) A Tang	½
8	(France) A Firouzja	Bye
-	Bye 8

Second round
25	(Netherlands) J van Foreest	1½
153	(Slovakia) J Druska	½
89	(Poland) K Piorun	1½
40	(Austria) M Ragger	½
57	(Peru) J Cori	3½
72	(Argentina) S Mareco	2½
121	(Uzbekistan) J Sindarov	3½
8	(France) A Firouzja	2½

Third round
25	(Netherlands) J van Foreest	½
89	(Poland) K Piorun	1½
57	(Peru) J Cori	½
121	(Uzbekistan) J Sindarov	1½

Fourth round
89	(Poland) K Piorun	1½
121	(Uzbekistan) J Sindarov	½

=== Section 5 ===
First round
5	(Russia) A Grischuk	Bye
-	Bye 5
124	(Argentina) F Perez Ponsa	3½
133	(Bulgaria) M Nikolov	2½
69	(Argentina) A Pichot	2
188	(Costa Rica) S Minero Pineda	0
60	(Croatia) I Šarić	2
197	(Angola) S Miguel	0
37	(Ukraine) A Korobov	Bye
-	Bye 37
92	(Chile) C Henriquez Villagra	2
165	(Singapore) Goh Wei Ming	0
101	(North Macedonia) K Georgiev	1½
156	(Belgium) A Dgebuadze	½
28	(Iran) P Maghsoodloo	Bye
-	Bye 28

Second round
5	(Russia) A Grischuk	1½
124	(Argentina) F Perez Ponsa	½
69	(Argentina) A Pichot	1½
60	(Croatia) I Šarić	½
37	(Ukraine) A Korobov	1½
92	(Chile) C Henriquez Villagra	½
101	(North Macedonia) K Georgiev	2½
28	(Iran) P Maghsoodloo	1½

Third round
5	(Russia) A Grischuk	1½
69	(Argentina) A Pichot	½
37	(Ukraine) A Korobov	1½
101	(North Macedonia) K Georgiev	½

Fourth round
5	(Russia) A Grischuk	2½
37	(Ukraine) A Korobov	1½

=== Section 6 ===
First round
21	(Russia) E Tomashevsky	Bye
-	Bye 21
108	(Switzerland) S Bogner	½
149	(India) P Iniyan	1½
85	(Iran) P Idani	2
172	(Bangladesh) Z Rahman	0
44	(Spain) D Antón Guijarro	Bye
-	Bye 44
53	(United States) S Sevian	2
204	(Malaysia) S Subramaniam	0
76	(Netherlands) B Bok	2½
181	(Kyrgyzstan) A Abdyjapar	1½
117	(Latvia) N Meshkovs	½
140	(Paraguay) G Vázquez	1½
12	(Poland) J-K Duda	Bye
-	Bye 12

Second round
21	(Russia) E Tomashevsky	2
149	(India) P Iniyan	0
85	(Iran) P Idani	1½
44	(Spain) D Antón Guijarro	½
53	(United States) S Sevian	4
76	(Netherlands) B Bok	2
140	(Paraguay) G Vázquez	½
12	(Poland) J-K Duda	1½

Third round
21	(Russia) E Tomashevsky	1½
85	(Iran) P Idani	2½
53	(United States) S Sevian	½
12	(Poland) J-K Duda	1½

Fourth round
85	(Iran) P Idani	½
12	(Poland) J-K Duda	1½

=== Section 7 ===
First round
13	(India) V Gujrathi	Bye
-	Bye 13
116	(Brazil) A Fier	3½
141	(Slovakia) J Pecháč	2½
77	(Paraguay) N Delgado Ramírez	5
180	(Bangladesh) N Murshed	3
52	(India) B Adhiban	2
205	(Malawi) C Chipanga	0
45	(Sweden) N Grandelius	Bye
-	Bye 45
84	(United States) V Akobian	2½
173	(Colombia) E Valderrama Quiceno	1½
109	(Israel) V Mikhalevski	w/o
148	(Myanmar) Wynn Zaw Htun
20	(United States) J Xiong	Bye
-	Bye 20

Second round
13	(India) V Gujrathi	2½
116	(Brazil) A Fier	1½
77	(Paraguay) N Delgado Ramírez	0
52	(India) B Adhiban	2
45	(Sweden) N Grandelius	2½
84	(United States) V Akobian	1½
109	(Israel) V Mikhalevski	½
20	(United States) J Xiong	1½

Third round
13	(India) V Gujrathi	4½
52	(India) B Adhiban	3½
45	(Sweden) N Grandelius	1½
20	(United States) J Xiong	2½

Fourth round
13	(India) V Gujrathi	2
20	(United States) J Xiong	0

=== Section 8 ===
First round
29	(Czech Republic) D Navara	Bye
-	Bye 29
100	(Uzbekistan) N Yakubboev	1½
157	(Canada) R Preotu	½
93	(Azerbaijan) V Durarbayli	1½
164	(Finland) DV Sklyarov	½
36	(Russia) A Predke	Bye
-	Bye 36
61	(India) C Aravindh	2
196	(Philippines) M Concio	0
68	(Uzbekistan) N Abdusattorov	w/o
189	(Indonesia) M Ervan
125	(Russia) B Savchenko	2½
132	(Russia) N Afanasiev	1½
4	(Netherlands) A Giri	Bye
-	Bye 4

Second round
29	(Czech Republic) D Navara	1½
100	(Uzbekistan) N Yakubboev	½
93	(Azerbaijan) V Durarbayli	3
36	(Russia) A Predke	1
61	(India) C Aravindh	½
68	(Uzbekistan) N Abdusattorov	1½
125	(Russia) B Savchenko	0
4	(Netherlands) A Giri	2

Third round
29	(Czech Republic) D Navara	½
93	(Azerbaijan) V Durarbayli	1½
68	(Uzbekistan) N Abdusattorov	3
4	(Netherlands) A Giri	1

Fourth round
93	(Azerbaijan) V Durarbayli	4
68	(Uzbekistan) N Abdusattorov	2

=== Section 9 ===
First round
3	(Armenia) L Aronian	Bye
-	Bye 3
126	(Australia) B Cheng	3
131	(Turkey) V Şanal	1
67	(FIDE) V Kovalev	2
190	(Zimbabwe) R Makoto	0
62	(Russia) A Sarana	2
195	(Nigeria) O Ajibola	0
35	(Russia) D Jakovenko	Bye
-	Bye 35
94	(United States) T Gareyev	4
163	(Singapore) J Tin	2
99	(Paraguay) A Bachmann	1½
158	(Russia) K Shubin	½
30	(Russia) V Fedoseev	Bye
-	Bye 30

Second round
3	(Armenia) L Aronian	(Note: Aronian forfeited both games for health-related reasons.)
126	(Australia) B Cheng	w/o
67	(FIDE) V Kovalev	3½
62	(Russia) A Sarana	2½
35	(Russia) D Jakovenko	1½
94	(United States) T Gareyev	2½
99	(Paraguay) A Bachmann	0
30	(Russia) V Fedoseev	2

Third round
126	(Australia) B Cheng	½
67	(FIDE) V Kovalev	1½
94	(United States) T Gareyev	½
30	(Russia) V Fedoseev	1½

Fourth round
67	(FIDE) V Kovalev	0
30	(Russia) V Fedoseev	2

=== Section 10 ===
First round
19	(Spain) F Vallejo Pons	Bye
-	Bye 19
110	(Serbia) V Ivić	1½
147	(United States) R Hungaski	½
83	(Hungary) V Erdős	w/o
174	(Turkmenistan) S Atabayev
46	(Germany) M Blübaum	Bye
-	Bye 46
51	(Russia) S Sjugirov	2
206	(Guam) E Prudente	0
78	(India) N Sarin	1½
179	(Uganda) A Ssegwanyi	½
115	(Turkey) E Can	2
142	(Brazil) D Lima	0
14	(Russia) D Andreikin	Bye
-	Bye 14

Second round
19	(Spain) F Vallejo Pons	½
110	(Serbia) V Ivić	1½
83	(Hungary) V Erdős	1½
46	(Germany) M Blübaum	2½
51	(Russia) S Sjugirov	½
78	(India) N Sarin	1½
115	(Turkey) E Can	½
14	(Russia) D Andreikin	1½

Third round
110	(Serbia) V Ivić	1½
46	(Germany) M Blübaum	½
78	(India) N Sarin	½
14	(Russia) D Andreikin	1½

Fourth round
110	(Serbia) V Ivić	3
14	(Russia) D Andreikin	1

=== Section 11 ===
First round
11	(India) H Pentala	Bye
-	Bye 11
118	(Cuba) Y Quesada Pérez	1½
139	(Argentina) L Krysa	½
75	(Egypt) A Adly	1½
182	(Egypt) A Hesham	2½
54	(Romania) C Lupulescu	w/o
203	(New Zealand) ACZ Fan
43	(Hungary) F Berkes	Bye
-	Bye 43
86	(Iran) A Tabatabaei	2½
171	(Yemen) B Al Qudaimi	1½
107	(Bosnia and Herzegovina) D Kadrić	1½
150	(Mongolia) D Batsuren	½
22	(China) Y Yangyi	Bye
-	Bye 22

Second round
11	(India) H Pentala	1½
118	(Cuba) Y Quesada Pérez	½
182	(Egypt) A Hesham	0
54	(Romania) C Lupulescu	2
43	(Hungary) F Berkes	1½
86	(Iran) A Tabatabaei	2½
107	(Bosnia and Herzegovina) D Kadrić	0
22	(China) Y Yangyi	2

Third round
11	(India) H Pentala	1½
54	(Romania) C Lupulescu	½
86	(Iran) A Tabatabaei	1½
22	(China) Y Yangyi	½

Fourth round
11	(India) H Pentala	½
86	(Iran) A Tabatabaei	1½

=== Section 12 ===
First round
27	(Ukraine) Y Kryvoruchko	Bye
-	Bye 27
102	(Croatia) A Brkić	2
155	(Colombia) S Barrientos	0
91	(Serbia) A Inđić	2
166	(Montenegro) L Drašković	0
38	(United Arab Emirates) S Saleh	Bye
-	Bye 38
59	(Armenia) HM Martirosyan	3
198	(Zambia) C Mwali	1
70	(Turkey) M Yılmaz	1½
187	(United Arab Emirates) N Omar	½
123	(Brazil) K Mekhitarian	2½
134	(Mexico) J González Zamora	1½
6	(Azerbaijan) S Mamedyarov	Bye
-	Bye 6

Second round
27	(Ukraine) Y Kryvoruchko	½
102	(Croatia) A Brkić	1½
91	(Serbia) A Inđić	1
38	(United Arab Emirates) S Saleh	3
59	(Armenia) HM Martirosyan	1½
70	(Turkey) M Yılmaz	½
123	(Brazil) K Mekhitarian	1
6	(Azerbaijan) S Mamedyarov	3

Third round
102	(Croatia) A Brkić	2
38	(United Arab Emirates) S Saleh	0
59	(Armenia) HM Martirosyan	2½
6	(Azerbaijan) S Mamedyarov	1½

Fourth round
102	(Croatia) A Brkić	½
59	(Armenia) HM Martirosyan	1½

=== Section 13 ===
First round
7	(France) M Vachier-Lagrave	Bye
-	Bye 7
122	(United States) E Moradiabadi	w/o
135	(Faroe Islands) HD Ziska
71	(Russia) D Paravyan	2
186	(Morocco) M Tissir	0
58	(United States) A Onischuk	2
199	(Iraq) AAS Salih	0
39	(Armenia) G Sargissian	Bye
-	Bye 39
90	(India) R Praggnanandhaa	1½
167	(Philippines) P Bersamina	½
103	(Poland) M Krasenkow	1½
154	(Slovenia) M Šebenik	½
26	(Russia) K Alekseenko	Bye
-	Bye 26

Second round
7	(France) M Vachier-Lagrave	1½
122	(United States) E Moradiabadi	½
71	(Russia) D Paravyan	2
58	(United States) A Onischuk	0
39	(Armenia) G Sargissian	0
90	(India) R Praggnanandhaa	2
103	(Poland) M Krasenkow	1½
26	(Russia) K Alekseenko	½

Third round
7	(France) M Vachier-Lagrave	5
71	(Russia) D Paravyan	4
90	(India) R Praggnanandhaa	3
103	(Poland) M Krasenkow	1

Fourth round
7	(France) M Vachier-Lagrave	1½
90	(India) R Praggnanandhaa	½

=== Section 14 ===
First round
23	(Russia) V Artemiev	Bye
-	Bye 23
106	(Moldova) V Iordăchescu	2½
151	(Russia) V Murzin	3½
87	(Germany) A Braun	1½
170	(Lithuania) K Jukšta	½
42	(Israel) B Gelfand	Bye
-	Bye 42
55	(Russia) G Oparin	2
202	(Sri Lanka) RD Liyanage	0
74	(Romania) B-D Deac	w/o
183	(Tunisia) A Zaibi
119	(Georgia (country)) L Paichadze	0
138	(Uzbekistan) S Vokhidov	2
10	(Russia) S Karjakin	Bye
-	Bye 10

Second round
23	(Russia) V Artemiev	2½
151	(Russia) V Murzin	1½
87	(Germany) A Braun	½
42	(Israel) B Gelfand	1½
55	(Russia) G Oparin	2½
74	(Romania) B-D Deac	1½
138	(Uzbekistan) S Vokhidov	0
10	(Russia) S Karjakin	2

Third round
23	(Russia) V Artemiev	3
42	(Israel) B Gelfand	1
55	(Russia) G Oparin	½
10	(Russia) S Karjakin	1½

Fourth round
23	(Russia) V Artemiev	2½
10	(Russia) S Karjakin	3½

=== Section 15 ===
First round
15	(Russia) N Vitiugov	Bye
-	Bye 15
114	(Cuba) C Albornoz Cabrera	½
143	(Czech Republic) V Plát	1½
79	(United States) Y Zherebukh	1½
178	(Greece) E Ioannidis	½
50	(Spain) A Shirov	Bye
-	Bye 50
47	(Bulgaria) I Cheparinov	Bye
-	Bye 47
82	(Germany) R Svane	2
175	(Egypt) E El-Gindy	0
111	(Denmark) M Andersen	½
146	(Chile) P Salinas Herrera	1½
18	(Russia) P Svidler	Bye
-	Bye 18

Second round
15	(Russia) N Vitiugov	1½
143	(Czech Republic) V Plát	½
79	(United States) Y Zherebukh	2
50	(Spain) A Shirov	4
47	(Bulgaria) I Cheparinov	5
82	(Germany) R Svane	4
146	(Chile) P Salinas Herrera	½
18	(Russia) P Svidler	1½

Third round
15	(Russia) N Vitiugov	1½
50	(Spain) A Shirov	½
47	(Bulgaria) I Cheparinov	1½
18	(Russia) P Svidler	2½

Fourth round
15	(Russia) N Vitiugov	1½
18	(Russia) P Svidler	2½

=== Section 16 ===
First round
31	(United States) S Shankland	Bye
-	Bye 31
98	(Georgia (country)) B Jobava	1½
159	(United States) A Mishra	½
95	(Serbia) I Ivanišević	w/o
162	(Uruguay) A Rodríguez Vila
34	(Ukraine) A Areshchenko	Bye
-	Bye 34
63	(Russia) A Motylev	2
194	(Libya) AM Elarabi	0
66	(Kazakhstan) R Jumabayev	2
191	(Syria) B Eiti	0
127	(Indonesia) S Megaranto	2½
130	(Iran) E Ghaem-Maghami	1½
2	(United States) F Caruana	Bye
-	Bye 2

Second round
31	(United States) S Shankland	1½
98	(Georgia (country)) B Jobava	½
95	(Serbia) I Ivanišević	½
34	(Ukraine) A Areshchenko	1½
63	(Russia) A Motylev	½
66	(Kazakhstan) R Jumabayev	1½
127	(Indonesia) S Megaranto	0 (Note: Caruana won the first game by forfeit, after Megaranto's COVID-19 test was confirmed as positive, 15 moves into the first game. As a result, Megaranto was forced to forfeit the second game. FIDE confirmed a mid-game forfeit had occurred, but did not name the player, citing "privacy regulations".)
2	(United States) F Caruana	2

Third round
31	(United States) S Shankland	2½
34	(Ukraine) A Areshchenko	1½
66	(Kazakhstan) R Jumabayev	1½
2	(United States) F Caruana	½

Fourth round
31	(United States) S Shankland	1½
66	(Kazakhstan) R Jumabayev	½

== Rounds 5–8 ==
Fifth round
1	(Norway) Magnus Carlsen	5
16	(Russia) Andrey Esipenko	3
41	(France) Étienne Bacrot	4
89	(Poland) Kacper Piorun	2
5	(Russia) Alexander Grischuk	1½
12	(Poland) Jan-Krzysztof Duda	2½
13	(India) Vidit Gujrathi	1½
93	(Azerbaijan) Vasif Durarbayli	½
30	(Russia) Vladimir Fedoseev	3
110	(Serbia) Velimir Ivić	1
86	(Iran) Amin Tabatabaei	2½
59	(Armenia) Haik M. Martirosyan	1½
7	(France) Maxime Vachier-Lagrave	2½
10	(Russia) Sergey Karjakin	3½
18	(Russia) Peter Svidler	½
31	(United States) Sam Shankland	1½

Quarterfinals
1	(Norway) Magnus Carlsen	2
41	(France) Étienne Bacrot	0
12	(Poland) Jan-Krzysztof Duda	1½
13	(India) Vidit Gujrathi	½
30	(Russia) Vladimir Fedoseev	1½
86	(Iran) Amin Tabatabaei	½
10	(Russia) Sergey Karjakin	4
31	(United States) Sam Shankland	2

Semifinals
1	(Norway) Magnus Carlsen	1½
12	(Poland) Jan-Krzysztof Duda	2½
30	(Russia) Vladimir Fedoseev	½
10	(Russia) Sergey Karjakin	1½

Final
12	(Poland) Jan-Krzysztof Duda	1½
10	(Russia) Sergey Karjakin	½
Third place
1	(Norway) Magnus Carlsen	2
30	(Russia) Vladimir Fedoseev	0

=== Third place ===
Seed	Name	Jul 2021 rating	1	2	Total
1	(Norway) Magnus Carlsen	2847	1	1	2
30	(Russia) Vladimir Fedoseev	2696	0	0	0

=== Finals ===
Seed	Name	Jul 2021 rating	1	2	Total
12	(Poland) Jan-Krzysztof Duda	2738	½	1	1½
10	(Russia) Sergey Karjakin	2757	½	0	½

== See also ==
- Women's Chess World Cup 2021
