= Danilo Milanović =

Serbian chess grandmaster (born 1974)

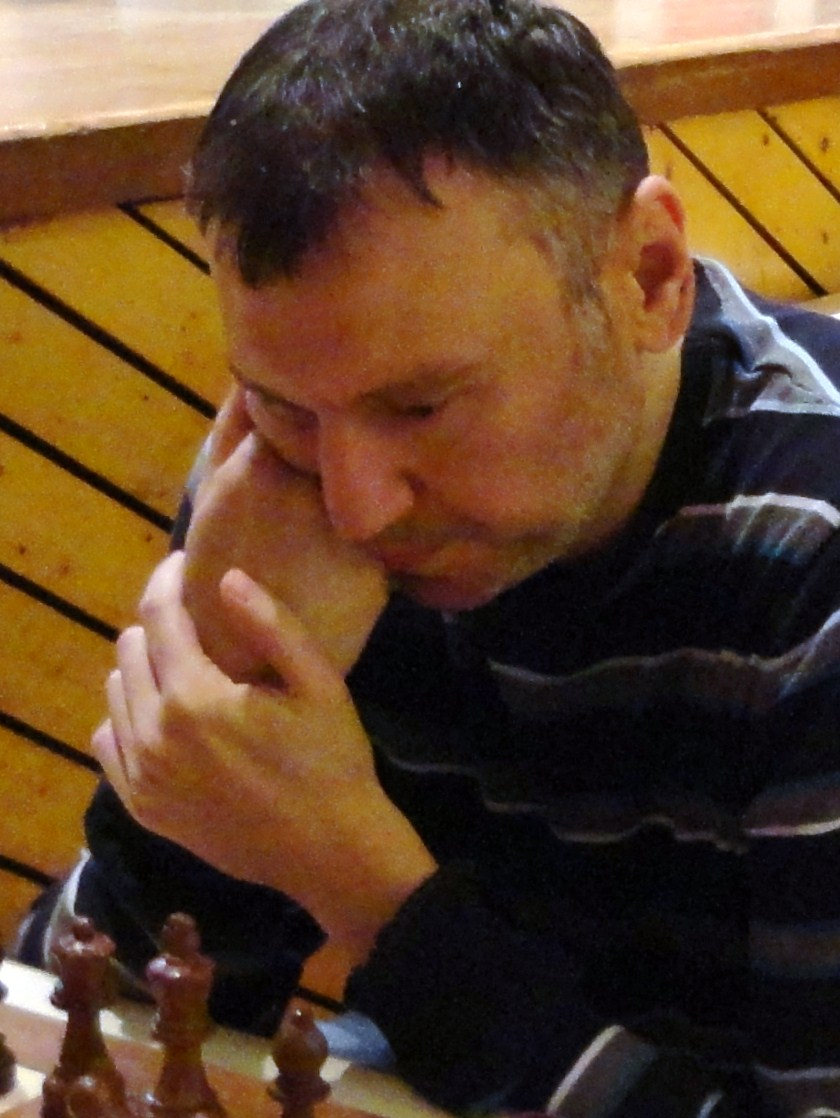

Personal information
- Born: January 18, 1974 (age 52) Smederevska Palanka, Serbia

Chess career
- Country: Serbia
- Title: Grandmaster (2008)
- Peak rating: 2564 (April 2009)

Danilo Milanović is a Serbian chess grandmaster.

== Chess career ==
He was awarded the Grandmaster title in 2008 after achieving his norms at the:

- Sozina International Open in April 2007
- Zupanja Open Tournament A in January 2008
- Kavala International Open Group A in August 2008

In December 2022, he won the Radojica Dabetić International Open in Podgorica, beating Stefan Tadić on tiebreak scores.

In May 2024, he played for the Pinggau-Friedberg team (alongside Denis Kadrić, Viktor Erdős, and Valentin Baidetskyi) in the Plus City Grand Prix in Pasching, Austria. The team won the silver medal.
