= Concio (surname) =

Concio is a surname of Italian origin. Notable people with this surname include:

- Cesar Concio (1907–2003), Filipino architect
- Joseph Concio, 17th century Italian-Jewish poet
- Michael Concio (born 2005), Filipino chess player

== See also ==
- Concio
