= Elmer Prudente =

Guamanian chess player (born 1965)

Personal information
- Born: February 18, 1965 (age 61) Iloilo City, Philippines

Chess career
- Country: Guam
- Title: Candidate Master (2018)
- Peak rating: 2017 (August 2022)

Elmer Prudente (born 18 February 1965 in Iloilo City, Philippines) is a Guamanian chess Candidate Master (CM) who has represented Guam at World Chess Olympiad.

== Chess career ==
Prudente started playing chess when he was ten years old, and was coached by his father. He participated in the 1989 US Open in Long Beach, California, and later went on to win the Guam Chess Championship title on multiple occasions.

He was awarded the Candidate Master title in 2018 for his performance at the 43rd Chess Olympiad in Batumi, Georgia where he scored 5/10 with a performance rating of 2066.

Prudente competed in the Oceania Zonal Chess Championships in 2019 in Tumon, Guam where he scored 5.5/9, and playing online chess in 2021 where he scored 3.5/7.

Elmer Prudente played in the Chess World Cup 2021 held in Sochi when the Australian representative Temur Kuybokarov withdrew due to Australian COVID-19 travel restrictions. He was defeated by Russian Grandmaster Sanan Sjugirov in the first round of the tournament.
