= Sandro Mareco =

Argentine chess grandmaster (born 1987)

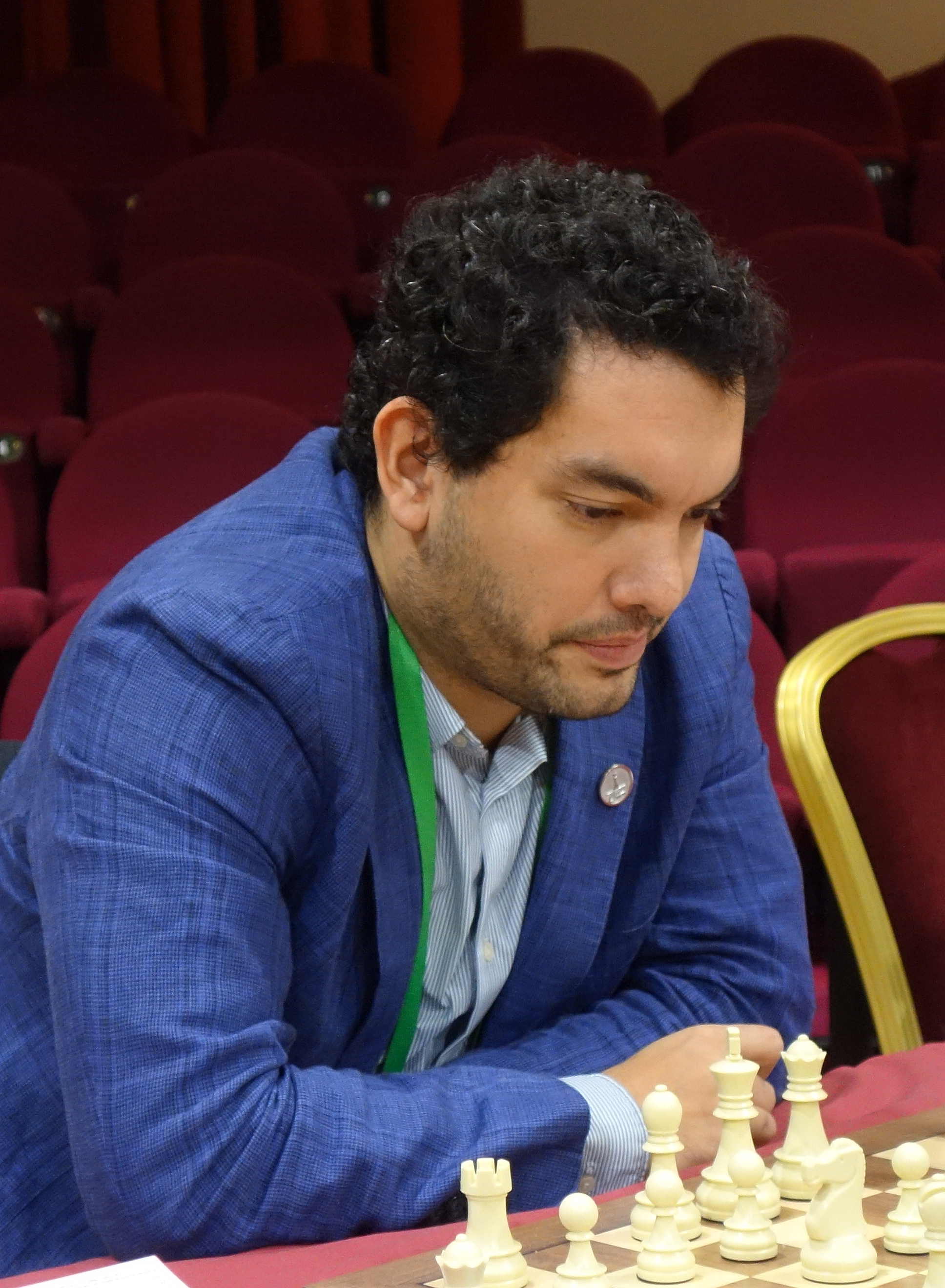
- Mareco in 2023

Personal information
- Born: Sandro Fabio Mareco; 13 May 1987 (age 39) Haedo, Buenos Aires Province, Argentina

Chess career
- Country: Argentina
- Title: Grandmaster (2010)
- FIDE rating: 2551 (July 2026)
- Peak rating: 2666 (March 2019)
- Peak ranking: No. 78 (March 2019)

Sandro Fabio Mareco (born 13 May 1987) is an Argentine chess player. He was awarded the title of Grandmaster by FIDE in 2010. Mareco competed in the FIDE World Cup in 2011 (losing to Ferenc Berkes in the first round), 2013 (losing to David Navara in the first round), 2015 (beating Ni Hua in the first round and losing to Anton Kovalyov in the second round), 2017 (losing to Matthias Blübaum in the first round), 2019 (losing to Sanan Sjugirov in the first round) and 2021 (defeating Sami Khader in the first round). He has played for the Argentine national team in the Chess Olympiad since 2012.

== Biography ==
Born in Haedo, Buenos Aires Province, Mareco won the South American Under 20 Championship in 2007. Thanks to this victory, he received a direct award of the title of International Master the following year. In 2012 he tied for first place in the Argentine Chess Championship, finishing second on countback.

In 2015, Mareco won the 10th American Continental Championship in Montevideo, Uruguay and the Argentine championship. In 2017 he won the Marcel Duchamp Cup in Montevideo with a perfect score of 9/9 points. In 2018 he won the HDBank Cup International Open in Hanoi, Vietnam and the Hogeschool Zeeland Tournament in Vlissingen, the Netherlands.
