= Jakhongir Vakhidov =

Uzbekistani chess grandmaster (born 1995)

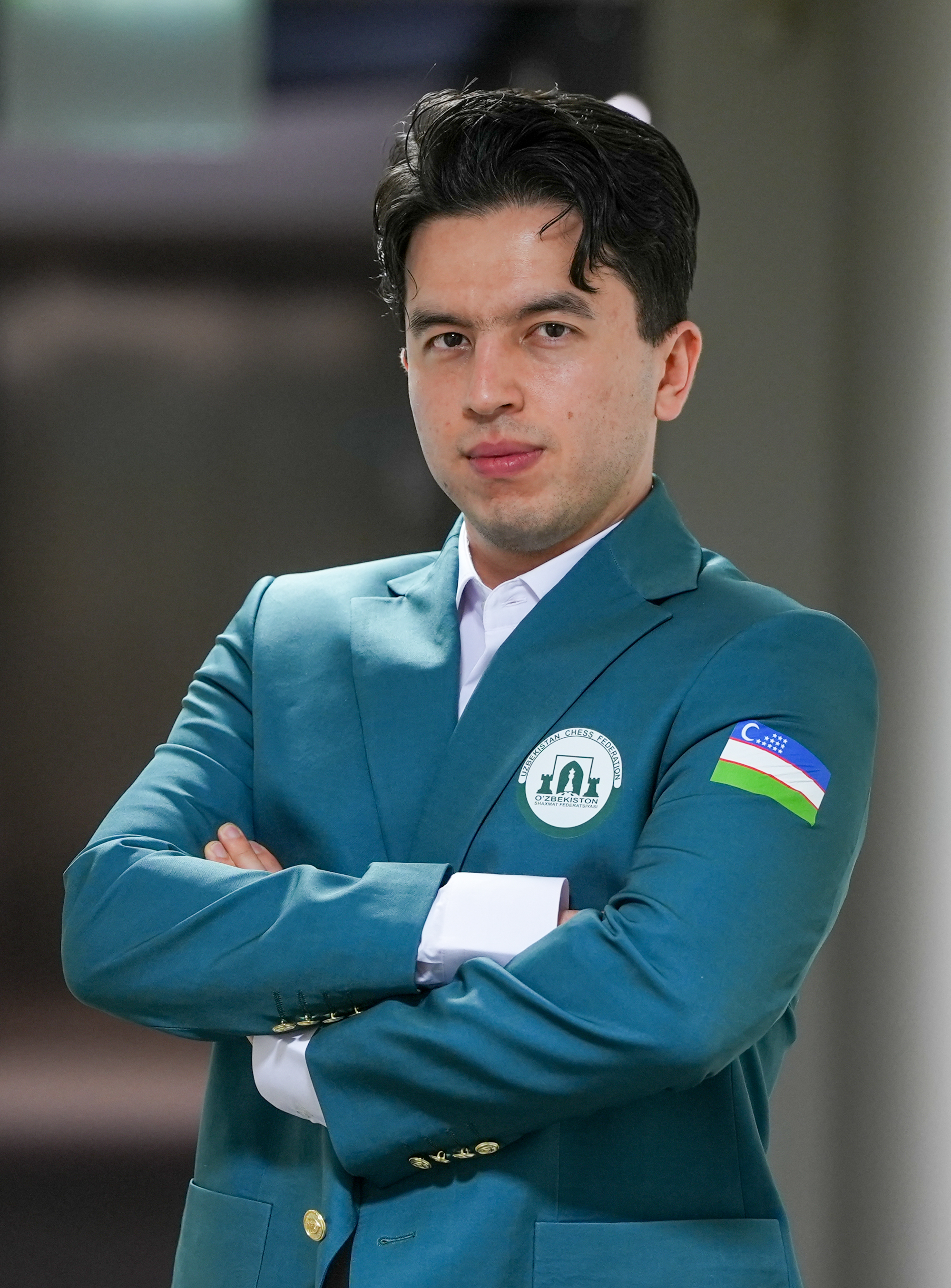
- Vakhidov in 2024

Personal information
- Born: April 27, 1995 (age 31) Samarkand, Uzbekistan

Chess career
- Country: Uzbekistan
- Title: Grandmaster (2014)
- FIDE rating: 2527 (September 2026)
- Peak rating: 2618 (July 2023)

Jakhongir Tokhirovich Vakhidov (Uzbek: Jahongir Tohirovich Vohidov, Жаҳонгир Тоҳирович Воҳидов; born 1995) is an Uzbek chess player who holds the title of Grandmaster, which he was awarded in 2014.

Vakhidov was joint winner of the Hastings International Chess Congress in 2013/14 and 2015/16. He also qualified for the Chess World Cup 2017, where he was defeated in the first round by Peter Svidler.

He qualified again for the Chess World Cup 2021 where, ranked 137th, he defeated Levan Pantsulaia 1½–½ in the first round, and ninth seed Leinier Domínguez Pérez 3–1 in the second round, before being defeated by Pavel Ponkratov in the third round.

In the 2022 Chess Olympiad, Vakhidov defeated Max Warmerdam on Board 4 in the decisive game of the final round, tipping the outcome of the match in favour of Uzbekistan and allowing them to emerge victorious in the Olympiad. He scored 6½/8 with a performance rating of 2813, making him the best overall player on Board 4 in the open section.

In June 2023, Ding Liren revealed in an interview with New In Chess that apart from Richard Rapport, Vakhidov was his other second during the World Chess Championship 2023, in which Ding won against Ian Nepomniachtchi.
