= Bashir Eiti =

Syrian chess player (born 1995)

Personal information
- Born: 1995 (age 30–31)

Chess career
- Country: Syria
- Title: International Master (2012)
- Peak rating: 2370 (September 2022)

Bashir Eiti (Note: or Bashir Iyti) is a Syrian chess player. He was awarded the title of International Master (IM) in 2012.

== Chess career ==
He has represented Syria in a number of Chess Olympiads, including 2012 (scoring 5/10 on board three), 2014 (6½/11 on board one) and (2018 (8/10 on board four).

He qualified to play in the Chess World Cup 2021 where he was defeated 2-0 by Rinat Jumabayev in the first round.
