= Saparmyrat Atabayev =

Turkmenistani chess grandmaster (born 1999)

- Atabayev at the 46th Chess Olympiad

Personal information
- Born: May 30, 1999 (age 27) Ashgabat, Turkmenistan

Chess career
- Country: Turkmenistan
- Title: Grandmaster (2025)
- FIDE rating: 2503 (September 2026)
- Peak rating: 2530 (April 2025)

Saparmyrat Atabayev (born 1999) is a Turkmen chess grandmaster. He was awarded the title of International Master in 2017 and Grandmaster in 2025.

== Chess career ==
Atabayev has represented Turkmenistan in a number of Chess Olympiads. He was selected in 2014, but the team did not play any of their games. In 2016 he scored 6/11 on board three, while in 2018 he scored 5½/11 on board two.

He qualified to play in the Chess World Cup 2021 where he was drawn against Viktor Erdős in the first round, but was unable to play.
