= Ilja Zaragatski =

German chess grandmaster (born 1985)

- Ilja Zaragatski in 2016

Personal information
- Native name: Илья Владимирович Зарагацкий
- Born: September 26, 1985 (age 41) Leningrad, Russian SFSR, Soviet Union

Chess career
- Country: Germany
- Title: Grandmaster (2013)
- FIDE rating: 2449 (November 2026)
- Peak rating: 2522 (October 2020)

Ilja Vladimirovich Zaragatski (Russian: Илья Владимирович Зарагацкий; born 26 September 1985) is a German chess Grandmaster of Russian origin.

== Early life and education ==
Zaragatski was born in 1985 in Leningrad (now Saint Petersburg), Soviet Union. He learned to play chess from his father at the age of four. When he was seven years old, his family emigrated to Germany, and he grew up in Mönchengladbach, where he completed his Abitur at the Hugo-Junkers-Gymnasium in 2004.

He initially studied social psychology and philosophy at the Ruhr University Bochum, before switching in 2006 to economics and sociology at the University of Cologne. He also served as managing director of cisha GmbH, the Hamburg-based company behind the chess platform chess24.

His first name was adapted to German spelling ("Ilja"), while his surname retained an English transliteration ("Zaragatski").

== Chess career ==
In May 2002, Zaragatski won the German U18 Individual Championship in Winterberg ahead of Arik Braun. Representing the German U18 national team at the European Youth Team Championships in Balatonlelle (2001, 2002, and 2003), he won team bronze in 2002 and an individual bronze medal on board two in 2003.

Zaragatski was awarded the International Master (IM) title by FIDE in September 2007, having earned his norms at the Bad Wörishofen Open in 2005, the Neckar Open in Deizisau in 2006, and during the 2006–07 Belgian 1st Division season. He achieved the Grandmaster (GM) title in October 2013, with norms earned at the Neckar Open in 2009 and 2013, and a third-place finish at the Vlissingen Open in 2010.

His peak Elo rating was 2522, achieved in October 2020.

=== Club career ===
Zaragatski played youth chess for SG Bochum 31, winning four German youth team titles. In the German Schachbundesliga, he has represented Sportfreunde Katernberg, DJK Aufwärts St. Josef Aachen, and SC Viernheim.

Internationally, he has played in several European leagues:

- Belgium: Won the Belgian team championship with KSK 47 Eynatten (2005) and Amay / L'Echiquier Mosan (2015). Also represented Namur at the European Club Cup.
- Netherlands: Played in the Meesterklasse for BIS Beamer Team, Accres Apeldoorn, SISSA Groningen, Zuid-Limburg, and Bussums Schaakgenootschap.
- Other leagues: Has competed in the Luxembourg league (Le Cavalier Differdange), Austrian Bundesliga (SK Advisory Invest Baden), and the British Four Nations Chess League (Cheddleton).
