= Velimir Ivić =

Serbian chess grandmaster (born 2002)

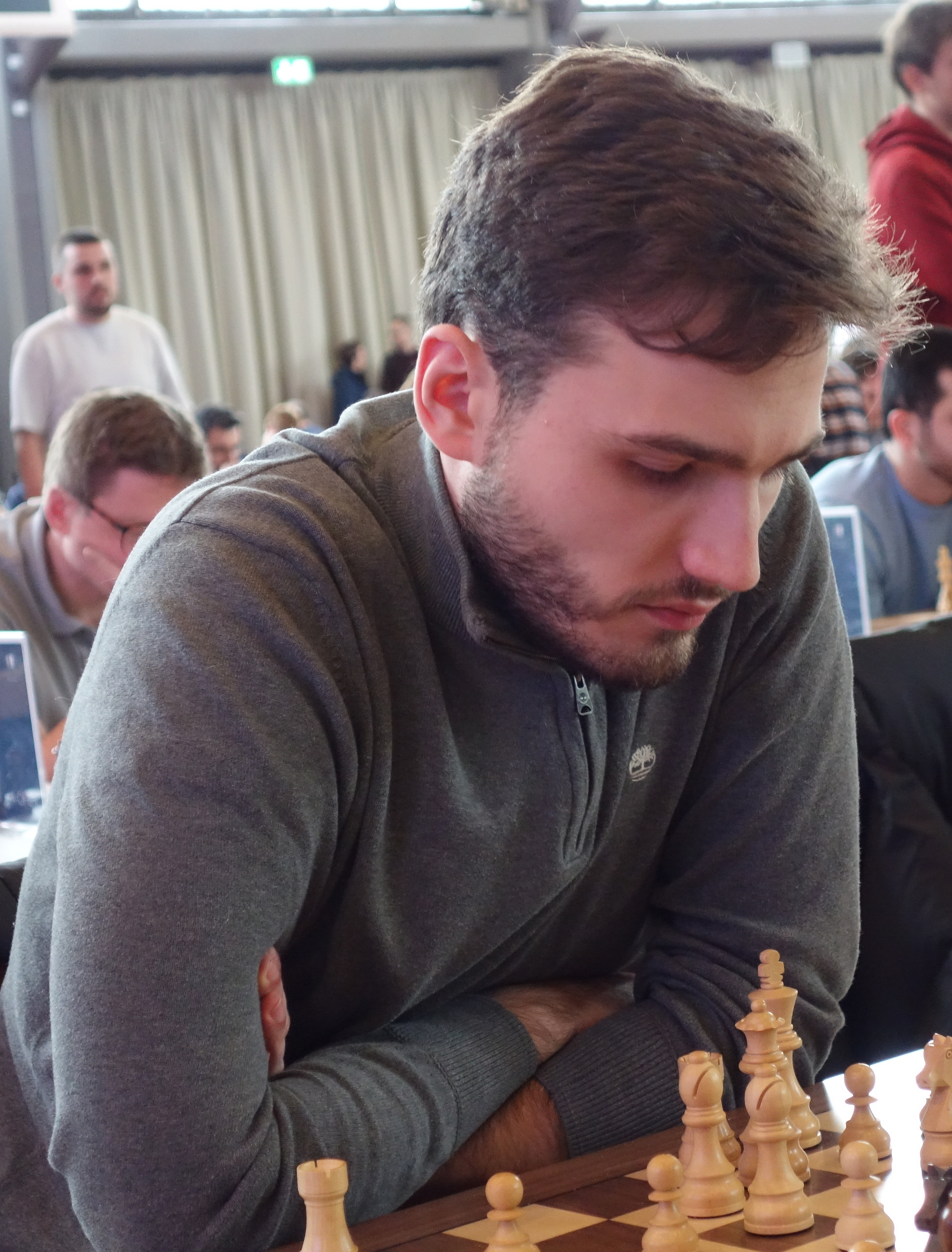
- Ivić in 2024

Personal information
- Born: 27 August 2002 (age 23) Belgrade, Serbia, FR Yugoslavia

Chess career
- Country: Serbia
- Title: Grandmaster (2020)
- FIDE rating: 2600 (July 2026)
- Peak rating: 2639 (June 2025)
- Peak ranking: No. 84 (January 2026)

Velimir Ivić (Serbian Cyrillic: Велимир Ивић; born 27 August 2002) is a Serbian chess grandmaster since 2020. He has been an International Master since 2018 and a FIDE Master since 2016. As of July 2022, Ivić is ranked the third-best player in Serbia by FIDE rating.

== Chess career ==
Days before his 15th birthday, Ivić was a member of the silver medal-winning U18 Serbian team (lost to Germany on additional criteria) at the 2017 European Youth Team Chess Championship, scoring 6/7 on board 4, which earned him individual gold medal for his board and was also best overall result in the tournament according to points.

In 2016, Ivić represented Serbia at the World Youth U16 Chess Olympiad, scoring 2.5/8 on board 2, and scored seven points after eleven rounds at the World Youth Chess Championship U14, ranking 8th - 14th. Ivić participated in the Chess Olympiad 2018, scoring 4.5/8 on board 5.

In Sept 2019, at seventeen years and four days, Ivić became the youngest Serbian ever to earn all Grandmaster requirements and second youngest to earn third GM norm, few months short of record held by Milan Zajić, who was only awarded conditional GM title at 16). Title was awarded following submission of IT2 application form when Ivić officially broke the record held by Aleksandar Inđić and became the youngest Serbian Grandmaster also recognized by the media in Serbia until 29 November 2020 when Luka Budisavljević became the new record holder at the age of 16 years, 10 months, and 7 days.

Ivić qualified for the Chess World Cup 2021 where, ranked 110th, he defeated Robert Hungaski 1½-½ in the first round, 19th seed Francisco Vallejo Pons 1½-½ in the second round, 46th seed Matthias Bluebaum 1½-½ in the third round, and 14th seed Dmitry Andreikin 3-1 in the fourth round. He was defeated 3-1 by Vladimir Fedoseev in the fifth round.

At the Chess World Cup 2023, Ivić defeated Ediz Gurel with the score of 3-1 in the first round, and was eliminated by Francisco Vallejo Pons with the score of 0-2 in the second round.
