= Luka Drašković =

Montenegrin chess grandmaster (born 1995)

Personal information
- Born: September 20, 1995 (age 31) FR Yugoslavia

Chess career
- Country: Montenegro
- Title: Grandmaster (2022)
- FIDE rating: 2455 (November 2026)
- Peak rating: 2510 (March 2023)

Luka Drašković (born 1995) is a Montenegrin chess player. He was awarded the title of International Master in 2014 and the title of Grandmaster in 2022.

== Chess career ==
Drašković won the Montenegrin Chess Championship in 2021 and qualified for the Chess World Cup 2021, where he was defeated 2-0 by Aleksandar Inđić in the first round.

He has represented Montenegro in for Chess Olympiads:

- In 2016, where he scored 5/9 on board four.
- In 2018, where he scored 4½/9 on board four.
- In 2022
- In 2024
