= Pedro Ramón Martínez Reyes =

Venezuelan chess player (born 1991)

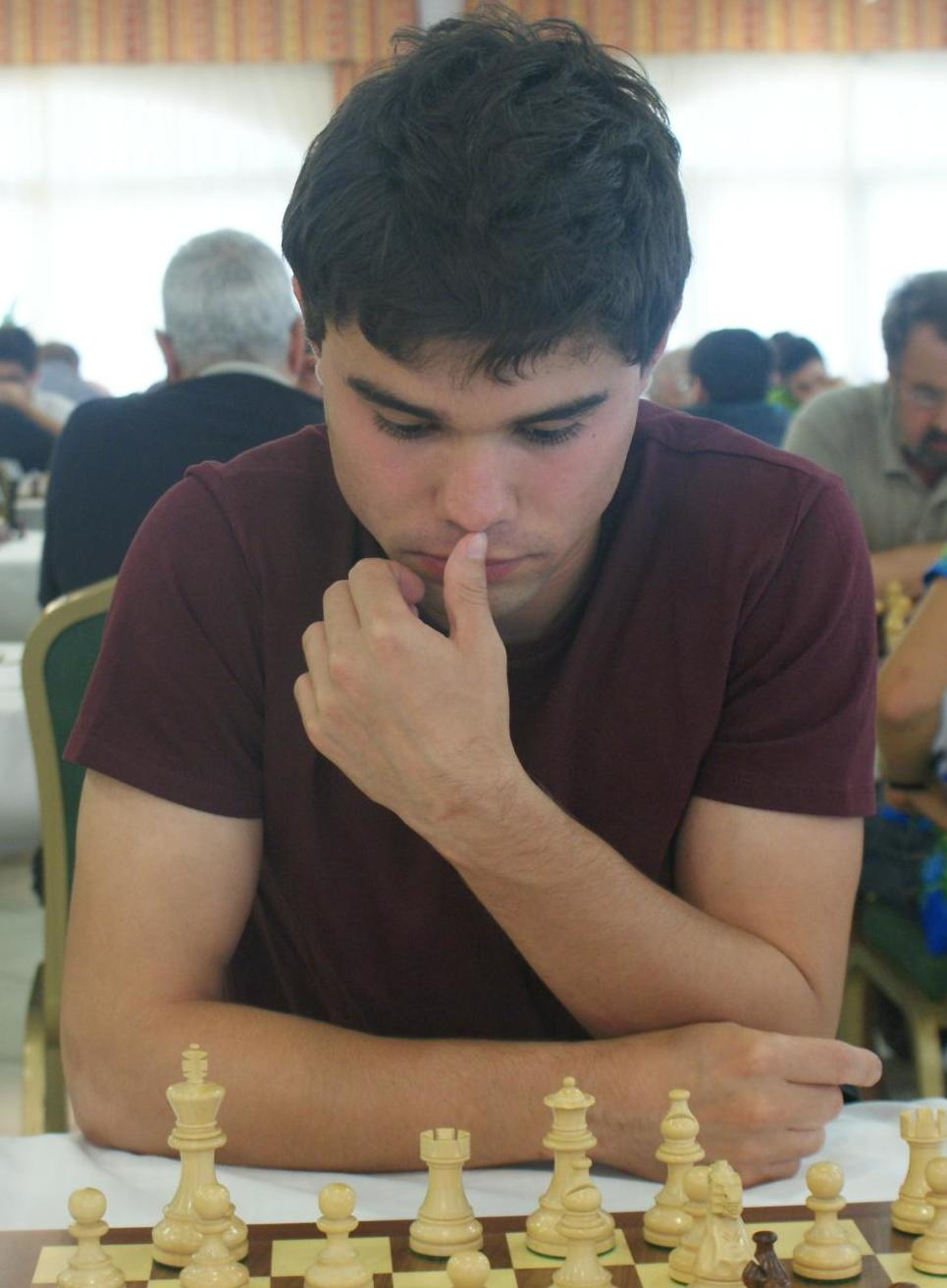
- Martínez at the 2012 Andorra Open

Personal information
- Born: November 23, 1991 (age 34)

Chess career
- Country: Venezuela
- Title: International Master (2025)
- Peak rating: 2427 (November 2020)

Pedro Ramón Martínez Reyes (born 1991) is a Venezuelan chess player. He was awarded the title of International Master in 2025.

== Chess career ==
Pedro Martínez represented Venezuela in the Chess Olympiad in 2012, where he scored 3/6 on first reserve.

He qualified for the Chess World Cup 2021, where he was defeated 2–0 by Shant Sargsyan in the first round.

Since 2014, he has been living in Madrid, where he competes in the league at the White and Black Chess Club. He also plays in the French league for the Marseille team since 2017. Currently, he works as a chess coach at the ONCE club, working with visually impaired individuals.

In Madrid, he has been the absolute champion of the Madrid Chess Federation in 2020, rapid chess champion in 2021, and blitz champion (speed chess) in 2022.
