= Chiletso Chipanga =

Malawian chess player (born 1987)

Personal information
- Born: March 8, 1987 (age 39) Zomba, Malawi

Chess career
- Country: Malawi
- Title: Candidate Master (2010)
- Peak rating: 2162 (June 2018)

Chiletso Chipanga (born 1987) is a Malawian chess player. He was awarded the tile of Candidate Master in 2010.

== Chess career ==
He grew up in Zomba and was introduced to chess at age 11 by his brother. Since Zomba did not host major chess tournaments, he travelled to Blantyre to participate in chess tournaments, first playing there in 2004. He won the Malawi Junior Chess Championship in 2006 and 2007, and qualified for the African Junior Chess Championship.

He has represented Malawi at numerous Chess Olympiads, including 2008 (scoring 4/11 on board two), 2010 (5/11 on board three), 2012 (3/10 on board one), 2014 (4.5/11 on board one), 2016 (4/8 on board three) and 2018 (3.5/10 on board three).

He won the Africa Amateurs Individual Chess Championship in 2017 and 2018, and finished sixth in the World Amateurs Chess Championship in 2018.

He qualified to play in the Chess World Cup 2021 as a nominee of the FIDE President, where he was defeated 2-0 by Indian Grandmaster Adhiban Baskaran in the first round.
