= Yasser Quesada =

Cuban chess grandmaster (born 1992)

Yasser Quesada Pérez
Personal information
- Born: May 23, 1992 (age 34) Villa Clara Province, Cuba

Chess career
- Country: Cuba
- Title: Grandmaster (2017)
- FIDE rating: 2547 (July 2026)
- Peak rating: 2609 (June 2023)

Yasser Quesada Pérez (born 1992) is a Cuban chess player. He was awarded the title of Grandmaster (GM) by FIDE in 2017, the 27th player from Cuba to earn the title. He won the 2022 Cuban Chess Championship.

He qualified to play in the Chess World Cup 2021, where he defeated Leandro Krysa in the first round, but was defeated by Pentala Harikrishna in the second round. He qualified to play in the Chess World Cup 2023, but declined to participate.

== Family ==
His older brother, Yuniesky Quesada, is also a Grandmaster.
