= Abdelrahman Hesham =

Egyptian chess grandmaster (born 1992)

Personal information
- Born: December 2, 1992 (age 33)

Chess career
- Country: Egypt; FIDE (2024) (Note: Several Egyptian players briefly switched federations in 2024 due to FIDE suspending membership of the Egyptian Chess Federation.)
- Title: Grandmaster (2016)
- Peak rating: 2450 (March 2019)

Abdelrahman Hesham (born 1992) is an Egyptian chess player. He was awarded the title Grandmaster by FIDE in 2016.

== Career ==
Hesham won the 2016 African Chess Championship, earning him the title of Grandmaster. In 2017 he became 7th at the African Championship, which was then won by Ahmed Adly.

At the FIDE Chess World Cup 2021 in Sochi he won in round 1 against Ahmed Adly, 2½–1½. In round 2 he was eliminated, 0–2, by the Rumanian GM Constantin Lupulescu.

In May 2023 he finished 5th at the African Championship, which was held in Gizeh, Egypt. In the same month he became 5th at the 6e Sharjah Challengers tournament, which was won by Ortik Nigmatov.

In March 2024 he won the SixDays Budapest IM March tournament, scoring 8/9.

He has also represented Egypt in two Chess Olympiads. In 2016, he played on board 5, ending on 5.5/9. In 2018, he played on board 4, finishing on 4.5/9.
