= Alisher Karimov =

Tajikistani chess player (born 1997)

Personal information
- Born: 1997 (age 28–29)

Chess career
- Country: Tajikistan
- Title: FIDE Master (2018)
- Peak rating: 2334 (January 2025)

Alisher Karimov (born 1997) is a Tajikistani chess player. He was awarded the title of FIDE Master in 2018.

== Chess career ==
He has represented Tajikistan in a number of Chess Olympiads, including 2016, where he scored 4½/9 on first reserve and 2018 (6/9 on first reserve).

He played in the Chess World Cup 2021, where he was defeated by 1½-½ by Jorge Cori in the first round.
