= Sumant Subramaniam =

Malaysian chess player (born 1993)

Personal information
- Born: June 23, 1993 (age 33)

Chess career
- Country: Malaysia
- Title: FIDE Master (2016)
- Peak rating: 2176 (October 2016)

Sumant Subramaniam (born 1993) is a Malaysian chess player. He was awarded the title of FIDE Master by FIDE in 2016.

== Chess career ==
He qualified to play in the Chess World Cup 2021 where he was defeated 2-0 by Samuel Sevian in the first round.
