= Olanrewaju Ajibola =

Nigerian chess player (born 1975)

Personal information
- Born: 1975 (age 50–51) Nigeria

Chess career
- Country: Nigeria
- Peak rating: 2337 (April 2020)

Olanrewaju Ajibola (born 1975) is a Nigerian chess player.

== Chess career ==
He represented Nigeria in the 39th Chess Olympiad, scoring 4/9 on board 2.

In March 2020, he won the Zone 4.2 Individual Open Chess Championship, winning the blitz and rapid sections as well as the classical.

He qualified for the Chess World Cup 2021 where he was defeated 2-0 by Alexey Sarana in the first round.

== Personal life ==
He graduated from the Federal University of Technology, Akure.
