= Juraj Druska =

Slovak chess grandmaster (born 1994)

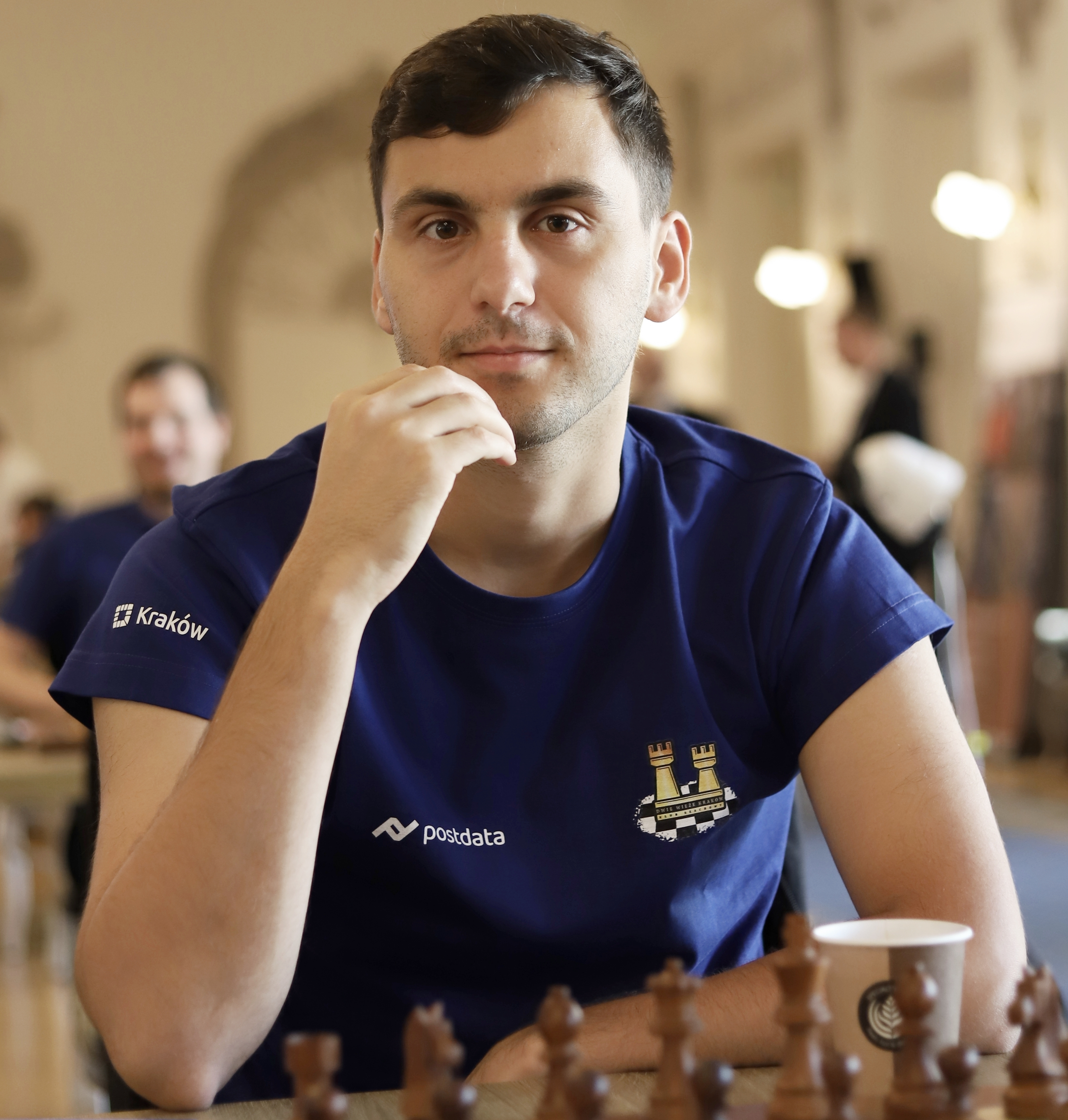
- Druska in 2021

Personal information
- Born: August 31, 1994 (age 32) Ružomberok, Slovakia

Chess career
- Country: Slovakia
- Title: Grandmaster (2025)
- FIDE rating: 2459 (September 2026)
- Peak rating: 2530 (August 2022)

Juraj Druska (born 1994) is a Slovak chess grandmaster.

In 2025, he earned his final grandmaster norm by scoring 6.5/9 at the Slovak championship in Piestany.

== Chess career ==
He won the CH18 Category of the Slovak Youth Championships in 2012. He qualified for the Chess World Cup 2021, where he defeated Mircea-Emilian Parligras (1.5/0.5) in the first round, before being knocked out by Jorden van Foreest (1.5/0.5) in the second round.
