= Robert Hungaski =

American chess grandmaster and coach (born 1987)

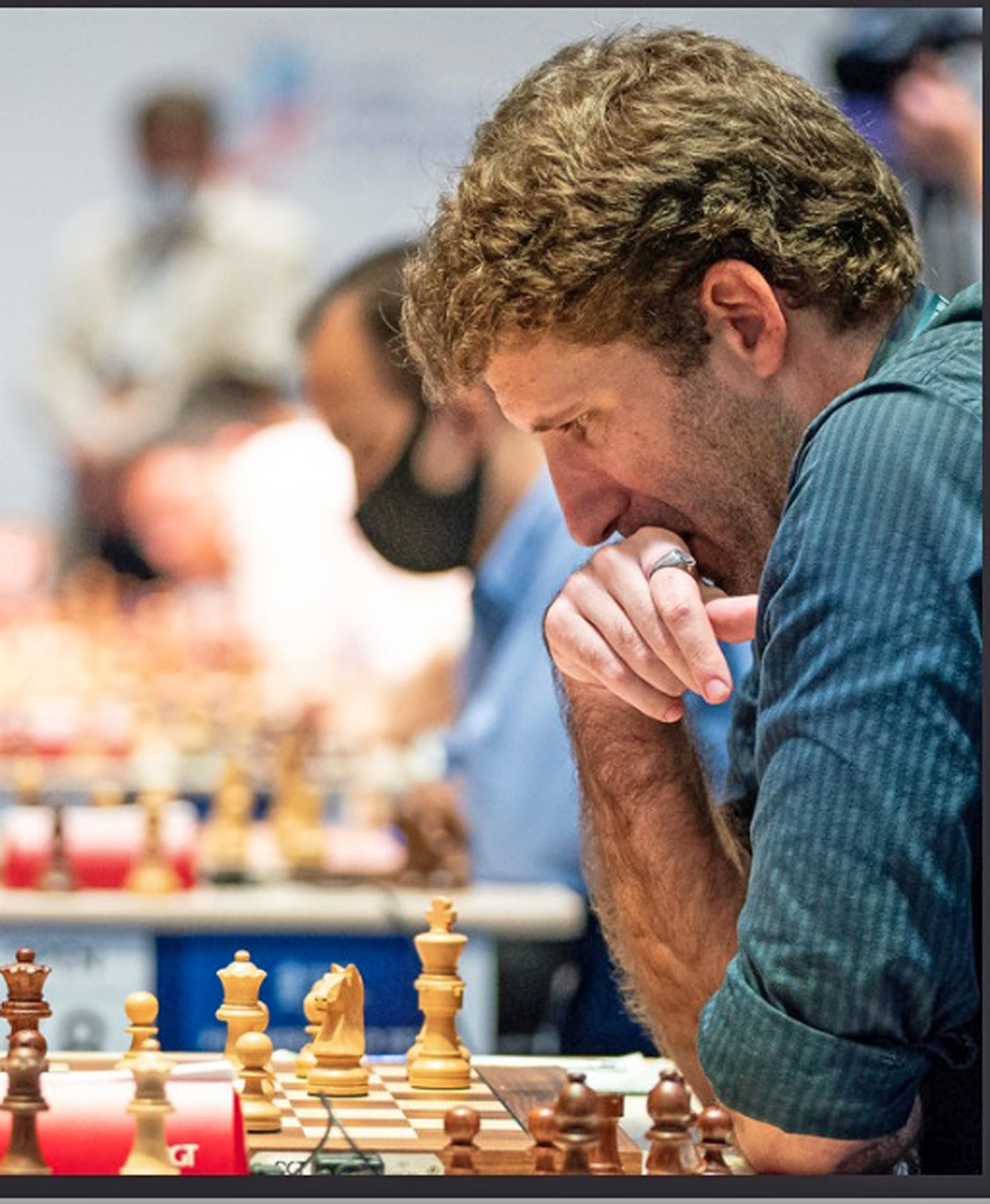
- Hungaski in 2021

Personal information
- Born: Robert Andrew Hungaski; December 8, 1987 (age 38) Stamford, Connecticut, U.S.

Chess career
- Country: United States
- Title: Grandmaster (2013)
- FIDE rating: 2493 (July 2026)
- Peak rating: 2554 (March 2022)

Robert Andrew Hungaski (born December 8, 1987) is an American-Argentine chess player and coach. He was awarded the FIDE title of Grandmaster (GM) in 2013.

== Early life and education ==
Born in Stamford, Connecticut on December 8, 1987 to an American father and an Argentine mother. Following his parents separation, he moved to Argentina at a young age and discovered chess within an after-school program at the age of six. Determined to pursue chess professionally by twelve, he dedicated himself to the game while excelling in his academic pursuits.

He achieved the title of International Master at age of 18 while in his senior year of high school, followed by title of Grandmaster at age of 24 during his college years.

Robert Hungaski earned a Bachelor of Arts degree in Political Science and Philosophy from the University of Connecticut in 2012, accompanied by minors in English and Middle Eastern Studies. Additionally, he holds an Emergency Medical Technician (EMT) certification issued by the State of New York.

== Career ==
=== Chess player ===
He won a gold medal at the Pan-American Junior Chess Championship in Ecuador in 2007, won the New York International in 2011, the Amsterdam International in 2012, the Argentina Cup in Buenos Aires in 2015 and the Montevideo Blitz Open in 2018.

He qualified to play in the Chess World Cup 2021, where he was defeated 1½-½ by Velimir Ivić in the first round.

In January 2022, he took second place in the Floripa Chess Open, the largest open chess tournament in Brazil.

In February 2022, he took second place in the Montevideo Chess Open.

=== Chess coach ===
Beyond his playing career, Hungaski possesses extensive experience as a chess coach. He holds the FIDE Senior Trainer title and frequently contributes to the development of young US players by participating in the coaching team for the World Youth Chess Championship and World Cadet Championships.

Between July 28 and August 10, 2022 he was captain of Argentina's Open Section Olympic Team.
