= Saša Martinović (chess player) =

Croatian chess grandmaster (born 1991)

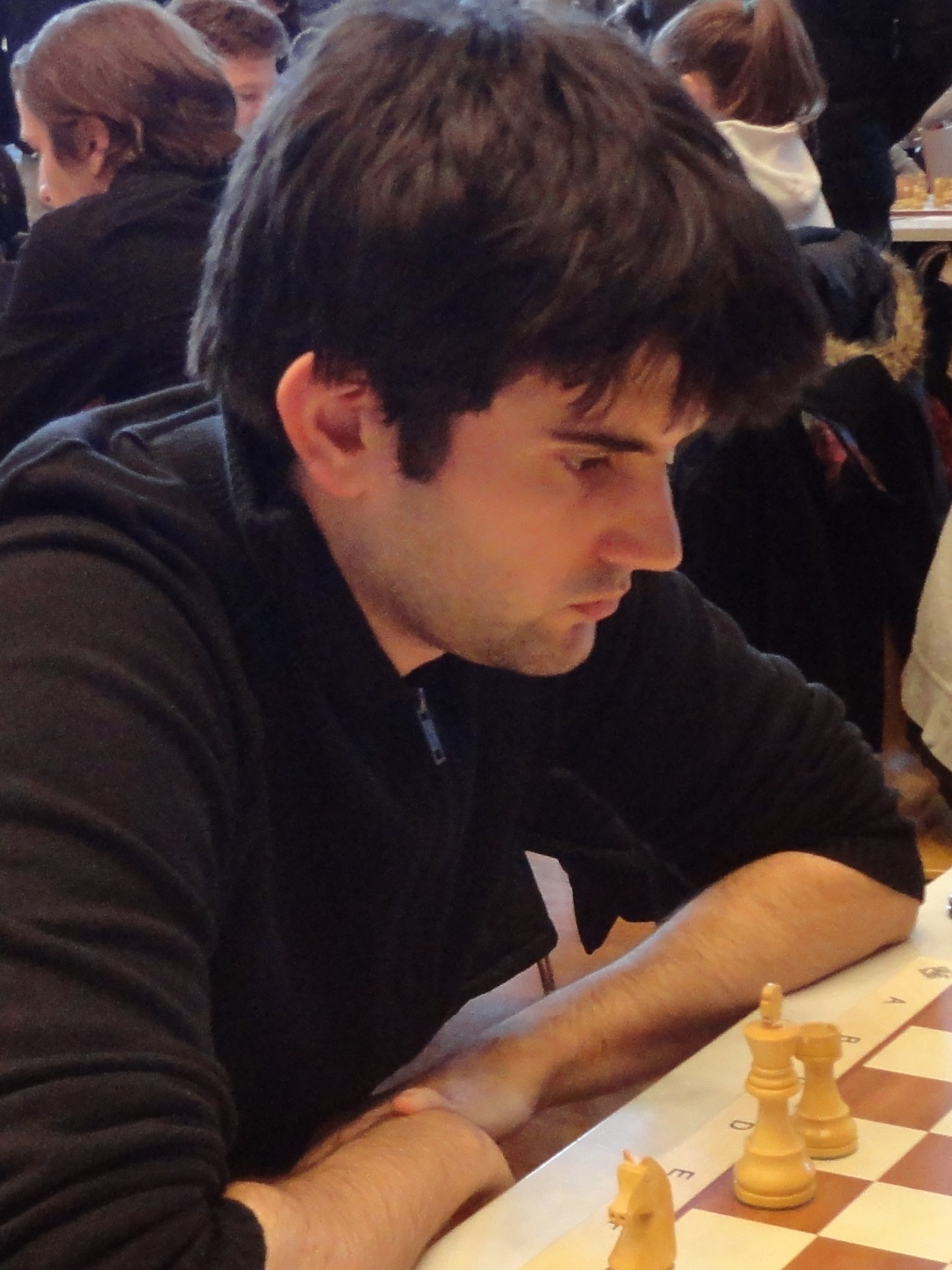
- Grenke Chess Open 2016 in Karlsruhe

Personal information
- Born: 15 July 1991 (age 35)

Chess career
- Country: Croatia
- Title: Grandmaster (2011)
- FIDE rating: 2553 (September 2026)
- Peak rating: 2604 (February 2018)

Saša Martinović (born 15 July 1991) is a Croatian chess grandmaster. He earned his IM title in 2008, and his GM title in 2011.

== Chess career ==
He won the 2014 Zagreb Open, the 2016 Split Chess Open and in 2020 won the Croatian Chess Championship, finishing on 7/11.

He qualified for the Chess World Cup 2021, where he defeated Kaido Kulaots 1½-½ in the first round, before losing 2-0 to World Champion Magnus Carlsen in the second round.
