= Denis Kadrić =

Montenegrin chess grandmaster (born 1995)

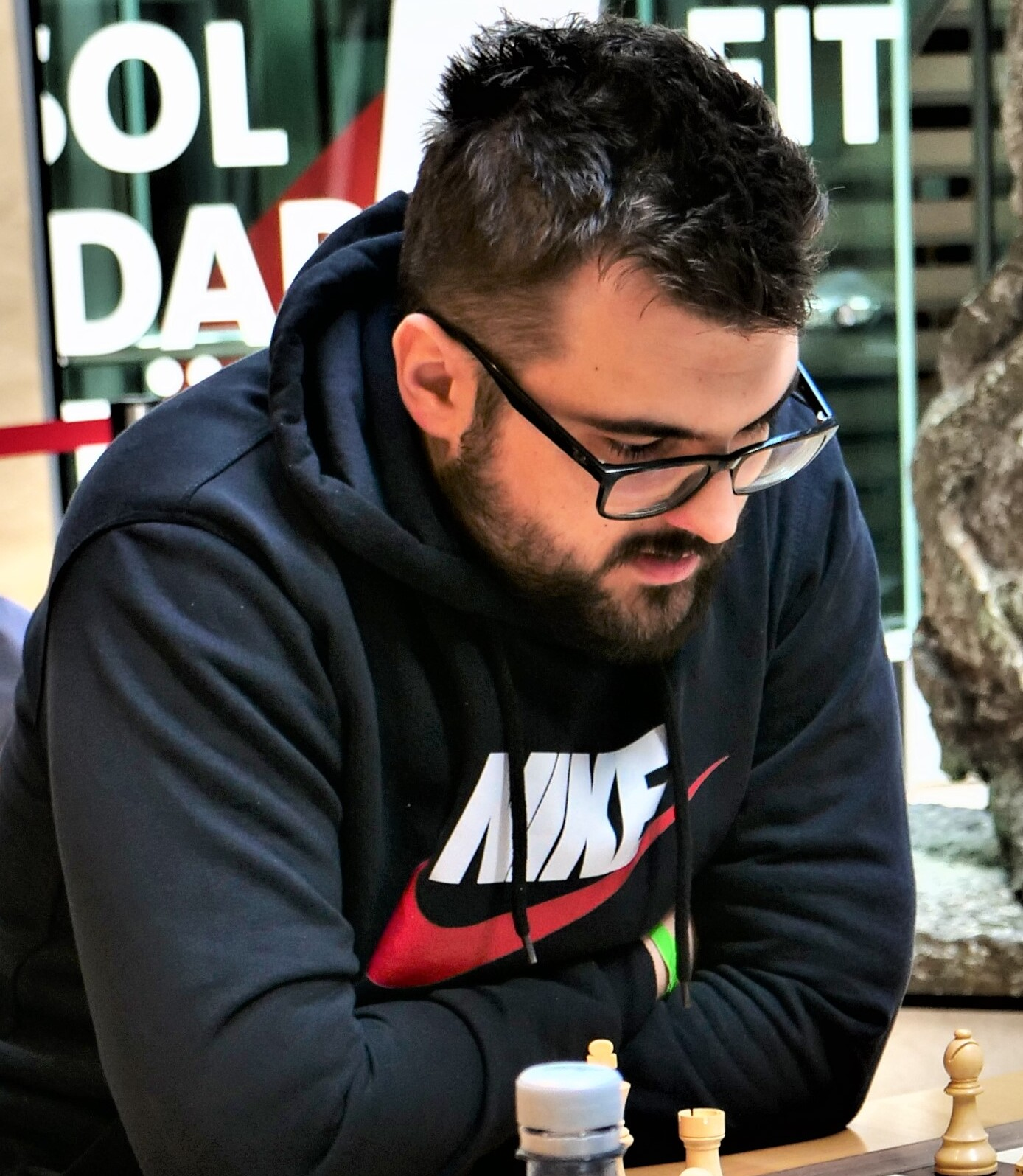
- Kadrić in 2023

Personal information
- Born: 12 June 1995 (age 31) Frankfurt, Germany

Chess career
- Country: Bosnia and Herzegovina (until 2022); Montenegro (since 2022)
- Title: Grandmaster (2015)
- FIDE rating: 2517 (July 2026)
- Peak rating: 2601 (April 2023)

Denis Kadrić (Montenegrin: Денис Кадрић, born 12 June 1995) is a Montenegrin chess player formerly representing Bosnia and Herzegovina. He holds the FIDE title of Grandmaster.

== Chess career ==
Kadrić family moved to Germany in 1992. He was born in 1995, and his family returned to Bosnia in 1998. When Kadrić was five years old, his father taught him the rules of the game.

Kadrić won the Bosnia and Herzegovina Chess Championship in 2013 in Cazin. He has represented Bosnia in four Chess Olympiads; 2012 (6.5/9 on board five), 2014 (7/11 on board four), 2016 (8.5/11 on board 2) and 2018 (7/11 on board one).

In 2011, Kadrić was awarded the title of International Master (IM) and in 2015 the title of Grandmaster (GM). In June 2021, he was the number one ranked player in Bosnia. He qualified for the Chess World Cup 2021, where he defeated Dambasürengiin Batsüren in the first round, but was defeated by Yu Yangyi in the second round.

In 2022, Kadrić transferred chess federations to represent Montenegro. He is the country's highest-rated player.

Kadrić qualified for the Chess World Cup 2023, where he was defeated by Pablo Salinas Herrera in the first round.
