= Nikita Afanasiev =

Russian chess grandmaster (born 2000)

Personal information
- Born: August 29, 2000 (age 25)

Chess career
- Country: Russia
- Title: Grandmaster (2020)
- FIDE rating: 2549 (July 2026)
- Peak rating: 2583 (June 2022)

Nikita Andreevich Afanasiev (born August 29, 2000) is a Russian chess player. He was awarded the title of Grandmaster by FIDE in 2020.

== Chess career ==
Afanasiev earned the FIDE Master title in 2014, International Master in 2019 and Grandmaster title in 2020.

He qualified to play in the Chess World Cup 2021 through the European continental qualifiers.

In March 2022, he won the Moscow Championship on tie-break ahead of Ivan Eletskiy and Viacheslav Zakhartsov after all scored 7/9.

In July 2023, he won the Aluston Open with a score of 7/9.
