= Asyl Abdyjapar =

Kyrgyzstani chess player (born 1988)

Asylbek Abdyjapar
Personal information
- Born: June 1, 1988 (age 38)

Chess career
- Country: Kyrgyzstan
- Title: International Master (2013)
- Peak rating: 2416 (June 2013)

Asylbek Abdyjapar (born 1988) is a Kyrgyzstani chess player. He was awarded the title of International Master in 2013.

He has represented Kyrgyzstan in a number of Chess Olympiads, including 2012 (7 1/2/11 on board three), 2014 (8/11 on board 2), 2016 (6/11 on board one), 2018 (8/10 on board three).

He won the 2021 Kyrgyzstan Chess Championship.

He qualified for the Chess World Cup 2021, where he was defeated 2 1/2-1 1/2 by Benjamin Bok in the first round.
