= Vasif Durarbayli =

Azerbaijani chess grandmaster (born 1992)

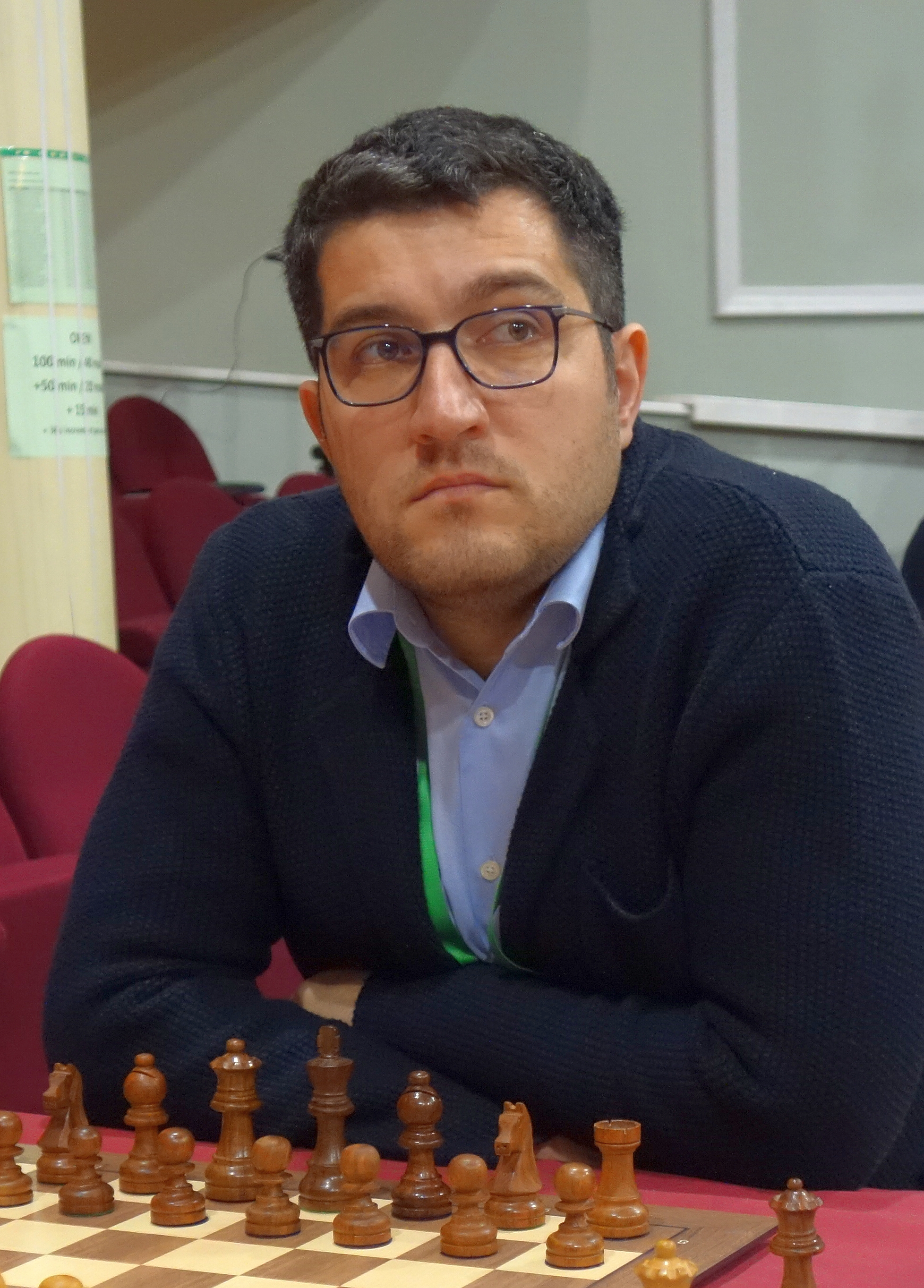

Personal information
- Born: February 24, 1992 (age 34) Sumqayit, Azerbaijan

Chess career
- Country: Azerbaijan
- Title: Grandmaster (2010)
- FIDE rating: 2611 (August 2026)
- Peak rating: 2638 (May 2022)

Vasif Durarbayli (Azerbaijani: Vasif Durarbəyli; born February 24, 1992) is an Azerbaijani chess Grandmaster. He received the International Master title in 2007 and the Grandmaster Title in 2010.

== Academic career ==
Vasif received his high-school degree in Sumqait, Azerbaijan, and graduated from Azerbaijan State of Physical Culture and Sports Academy in Baku with a degree in sports instruction. He studied economics at Webster University in St. Louis, Missouri, and served as the President of the Student Government Association.

== Chess career ==
He started his chess career in 1999. He has won many national titles. He was second in the European Youth Chess Championship under 14 years old (Budva, Serbia) in 2006 and he won the World Youth Chess Championship under 14 years old (Batumi, Georgia). He won the European Youth Chess Championship under 18 years old (Batumi, Georgia) in 2010. In 2013 he lost to Anton Korobov at the World Cup in the first round. In 2015, he entered the World Cup as an organizer nominee, but was eliminated in the first round by Lê Quang Liêm.

In 2018, he won the Summer Chess Classic, Group A, held in St. Louis. In 2019, he won 2nd place in the Sunway Sitges Festival after winning the tiebreaks with Rasmus Svane.

He qualified for the Chess World Cup 2021 where, ranked 93rd, he defeated Dmitry V. Sklyarov 1.5–0.5 in the first round, 36th seed Alexandr Predke 3–1 in the second round, 29th seed David Navara 1.5–0.5 in the third round, and Nodirbek Abdusattorov 4–2 in the fourth round.

In 2021, he won the Azerbaijani championship in Nakhchivan.

In 2023, he participated in the FIDE World Cup, won the first round against Leonel Figueredo Losada and lost the second round against Jules Moussard.
