= Omar Noaman =

Emirati chess player (born 1991)

Personal information
- Born: September 4, 1991 (age 34)

Chess career
- Country: United Arab Emirates
- Title: International Master (2012)
- Peak rating: 2403 (April 2015)

Omar Noaman (born 1991) is a chess player from the United Arab Emirates (UAE). He was awarded the title of International Master by FIDE in 2012.

== Chess career ==
He has represented the UAE in a number of Chess Olympiads, including 2010 (where he scored 6½/11 on board three), 2012 (3/8 on board two), 2014 (6/11 on board two), 2016 (5½/11 on board two), and 2018 (6/10 on board one).

He qualified for the Chess World Cup 2021, where he was defeated 1½-½ by Mustafa Yilmaz in the first round.
