= Sami Khader =

Jordanian chess player (born 1972)

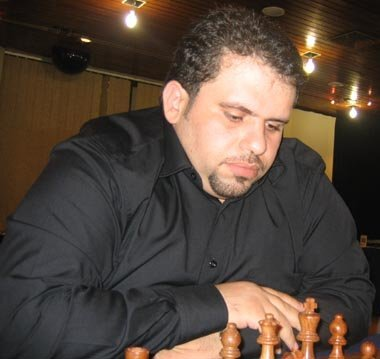

Personal information
- Born: August 9, 1972 (age 54) Jordan

Chess career
- Country: Jordan
- Title: International Master (2007)
- Peak rating: 2473 (May 2010)

Sami Khader (Arabic: سامي خضر; born 1972) is a Jordanian chess player. He was awarded the title of International Master in 2007.

== Chess career ==
He has represented Jordan in the Chess Olympiad numerous times, including 2010 (5.5/11 on board 1), 2012 (3.5/10 on board 1), 2014 (7/9 on board five) 2016 (8/8 on board 5). and 2018 (2/6 on board 5)

He played in the Chess World Cup 2021, where he was defeated by Sandro Mareco in the first round.
