= Pablo Salinas Herrera =

Chilean chess grandmaster (born 1994)

Personal information
- Born: 3 June 1994 (age 32) Concepción, Chile

Chess career
- Country: Chile
- Title: Grandmaster (2019)
- FIDE rating: 2460 (November 2026)
- Peak rating: 2534 (May 2022)

Pablo Salinas Herrera (born 3 June 1994) is a Chilean chess player. He was awarded the Grandmaster title by FIDE in 2019.

== Career ==
Salinas has won the Chilean Chess Championship five times; in 2011, 2012, 2019, 2020 and 2022.

He has represented Chile in the Chess Olympiad three times; in 2012 (scoring 3/8 on board 4), 2014 (5/7 on board 5) and 2018 (5.5/10 on board three).

Salinas earned the Chilean federation spot to qualify for the Chess World Cup 2021, where he defeated Mads Andersen 1½-½ in the first round, and was defeated by the same score by Peter Svidler in the second round.

He also qualified for the Chess World Cup 2023, where he defeated Denis Kadrić in the first round, but was defeated by Amin Tabatabaei in the second round.
