= Sergio Miguel =

Angolan chess player (born 1984)

Personal information
- Born: 1984 (age 41–42)

Chess career
- Country: Angola
- Title: FIDE Master (2019)
- Peak rating: 2377 (March 2020)

Sergio Miguel is an Angolan chess player. He was awarded the title of FIDE Master in 2019.

== Chess career ==
Miguel represented Angola in the 2012 Chess Olympiad (on board four, finishing on 4.5/7) and in the 2018 Chess Olympiad (board one, 4.5/11).

He qualified to play in the Chess World Cup 2021, where he was defeated 2-0 by Ivan Šarić in the first round.
