= Paweł Teclaf =

Polish chess grandmaster (born 2003)

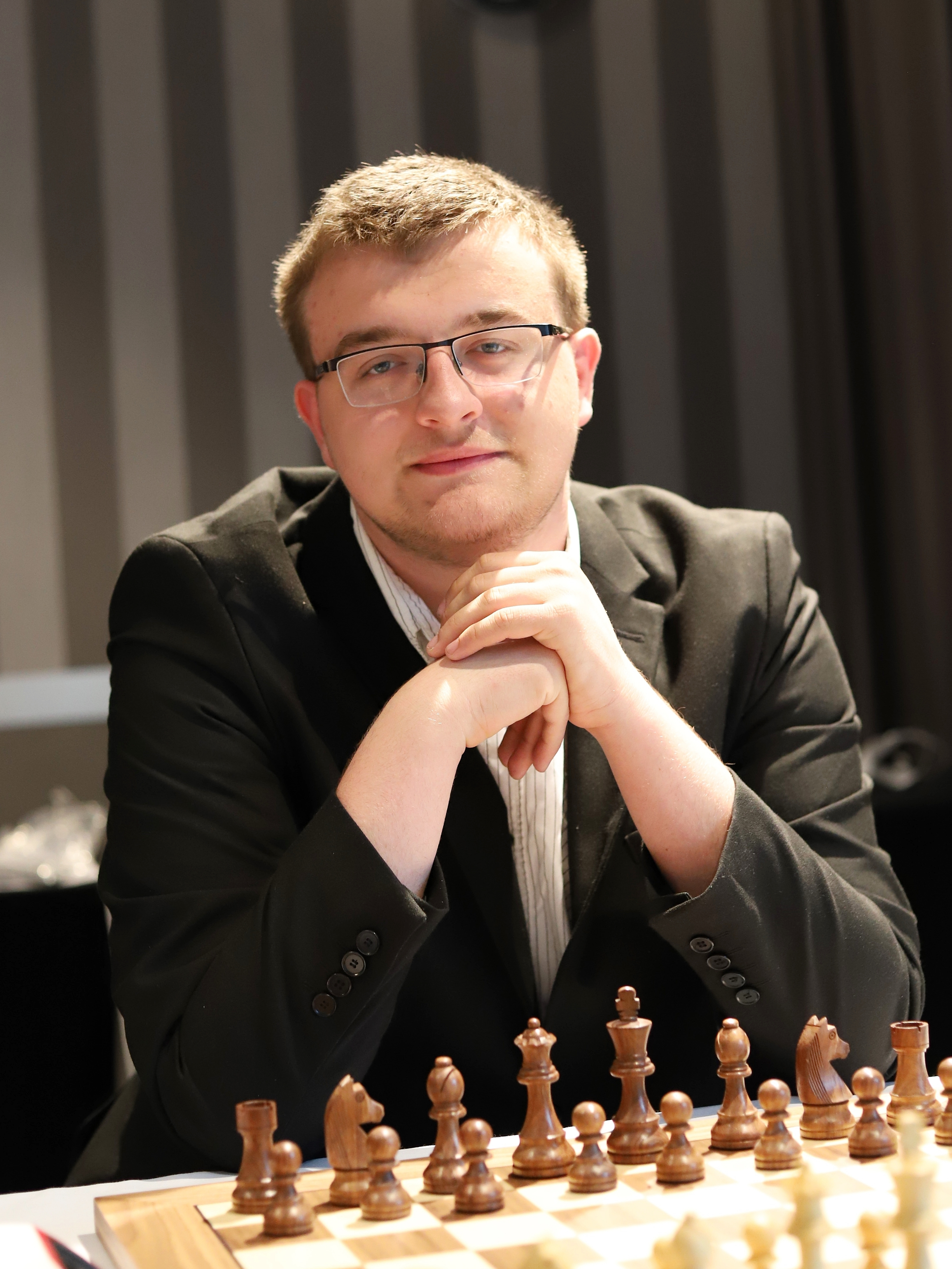
- Teclaf in 2021

Personal information
- Born: 18 June 2003 (age 23) Kartuzy, Poland

Chess career
- Country: Poland
- Title: Grandmaster (2023)
- FIDE rating: 2571 (July 2026)
- Peak rating: 2586 (August 2023)

Paweł Teclaf (born 18 June 2003) is a Polish chess player. He was awarded the titles of International Master by FIDE in 2019, and Grandmaster in 2023.

He qualified to play in the Chess World Cup 2021 where he was defeated by Gukesh D in the first round.

In December 2021, he became a media sensation after a video of him went viral at the World Blitz Championship. In the video, Teclaf played against GM Tigran L. Petrosian, blundered into a mating net and fell off his chair due to blunder in standing up. In good sportsmanship he still shook his opponent's hand.

In May 2025, he won Polish Chess Championship being undefeated in the tournament.
