= Allen Chi Zhou Fan =

New Zealand chess player (born 2004)

Personal information
- Born: 2004 (age 21–22)

Chess career
- Country: New Zealand
- Title: FIDE Master (2019)
- Peak rating: 2193 (March 2021)

Allen Chi Zhou Fan (born 2004) is a New Zealand chess player and FIDE Master.

== Chess career ==
He finished second in the New Zealand Open Junior Championship in 2017, scoring 4½/6.

In 2019, Fan was awarded the title of FIDE Master.

He qualified to play in the Chess World Cup 2021, where he was drawn to play Constantin Lupulescu in the first round, but he was unable to make it to the event and was defeated in a walkover.
