= Ravi Haria =

English chess grandmaster (born 1999)

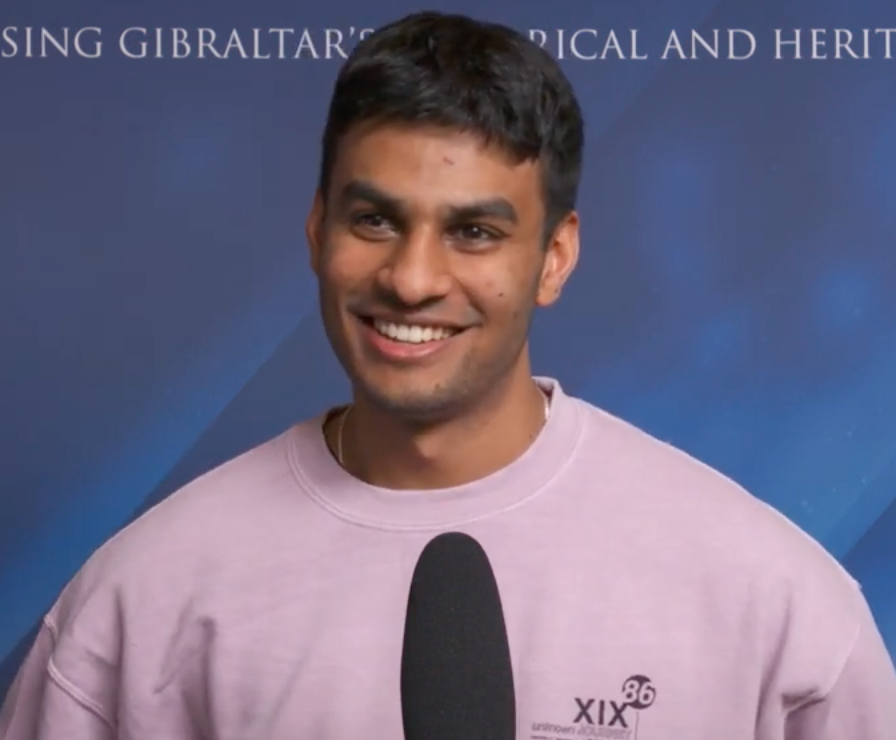
- Haria in 2022

Personal information
- Born: 7 February 1999 (age 27) Elstree, England

Chess career
- Country: England
- Title: Grandmaster (2022)
- FIDE rating: 2490 (November 2026)
- Peak rating: 2526 (August 2022)

Ravi Haria (born 7 February 1999 in Elstree) is an English chess player. He was awarded the title of Grandmaster in 2022.

== Chess career ==
In 2008 he won the under-9 British championship. He won the under-18 British championship in 2014, aged 15, and again in 2017. In 2021 he became the British under-21 champion.

Haria was the only English representative in the Chess World Cup 2021 in Sochi. In the first round he played Vadim Zvjaginsev. Haria defeated Zvjaginsev in their first game, lost the second, but won the two rapid tiebreak games to advance to the second round. In the second round he faced Étienne Bacrot, who as one of the 50 highest-ranked players in the tournament had received a bye in the first round. Haria lost the first game, won the second, and eventually lost on the tiebreak 2.5-1.5.

He gained his first GM norm in the 2016/17 4NCL British Team Championship, his second and third GM norms in August 2021 in a ten-player all-play-all in Stafford, England, and winning the Northumbria Masters in Newcastle-upon-Tyne. He lifted his rating above the 2500 threshold in November 2021 when selected as board five for England in the European Team Championship in Slovenia.

He is the author of the book The Modernised Anti-Sicilians. Volume 1: Rossolimo Variation.

== Personal life ==
Haria is from Barnet, London, and read History at University College London. He is also famously an Arsenal supporter. In his spare time he plays Wednesday night 5-a-side football for the South London side Crystal Phalice, who, after two seasons in the second division, have been promoted to Division 1. Haria plays in defensive roles and takes on goalkeeper responsibilities.
