= Dmitry V. Sklyarov =

Finnish chess player

Personal information
- Born: January 12, 1983 (age 43)

Chess career
- Country: Russia (until 2018); Finland (since 2018)
- Title: International Master (2012)
- FIDE rating: 2415 (July 2026)
- Peak rating: 2488 (December 2019)

Dmitry V. Sklyarov (born 1983) is a Finnish chess player. He was awarded the title of International Master in 2012.

== Chess career ==
He qualified for the Chess World Cup 2021, where he was defeated by Vasif Durarbayli 1.5-0.5 in the first round.
