= Michael Concio =

Filipino chess player (born 2005)

Michael Concio Jr.

Personal information
- Born: May 30, 2005 (age 21)

Chess career
- Country: Philippines
- Title: International Master (2021)
- FIDE rating: 2405 (November 2026)
- Peak rating: 2421 (August 2025)

Michael Concio Jr. (born 2005) is a Filipino chess player who holds the title of International Master. He has gained recognition for his achievements in chess tournaments both locally and internationally.

== Chess career ==
=== Chess World Cup Qualification ===
He qualified to play for the Chess World Cup 2021, where he was defeated 2-0 by Aravindh Chithambaram in the first round.

=== Philippine National Junior Champion ===
Concio won the Philippine National Juniors Chess Championship, defeating Gabriel Ryan Paradero in a dramatic final round. With 6.5 points, he earned the right to represent the Philippines in the 2025 World Junior Championships in Montenegro.

=== Bangkok Summer Open ===
In July 2025, he swept all nine games to clinch the standard title at the 1st Bangkok Summer International Chess Open.
