= Joseph Concio =

Italian-Jewish author

Joseph BEN Gershon Concio (Hebrew: יוסף בן גרשון קונציו, Italian: Giuseppe Conzio) was an Italian-Jewish author who lived in Asti and Chieri in the early seventeenth century.

== Work ==
Concio published several poems in Hebrew and Italian, including:

- Il Canto di Judit (Asti, 1614)
- Cinque enigmi con la conveniente esposizione (Asti, 1617)
- Ot le-tovah (Chieri, 1627), an acrostic on Talmudic arguments, which appeared alongside Shir le-siman ha-parashiyyot and Shirim bi-leshon ḥidah meḥubbarim
- Dibre Ester (Chieri, 1628), an allegorical commentary to Esther, published with Zeh ha-Shulḥan
- Ma'agal tov (Chieri, 1627–28), comprising seventeen sentences from the Talmud
- Shir Yehudit (Asti, 1628)
- Mar'eh ḥayyim (Chieri, 1629), halakic subjects in verse
- Meḳom binah (Chieri, 1629), comments on certain passages in Proverbs
- Teḥillat dabar, a treatise on logic
- Zokher ha-neshamot (unpublished), on the Plague of 1630–31
