= Rinat Jumabayev =

Kazakhstani chess grandmaster (born 1989)

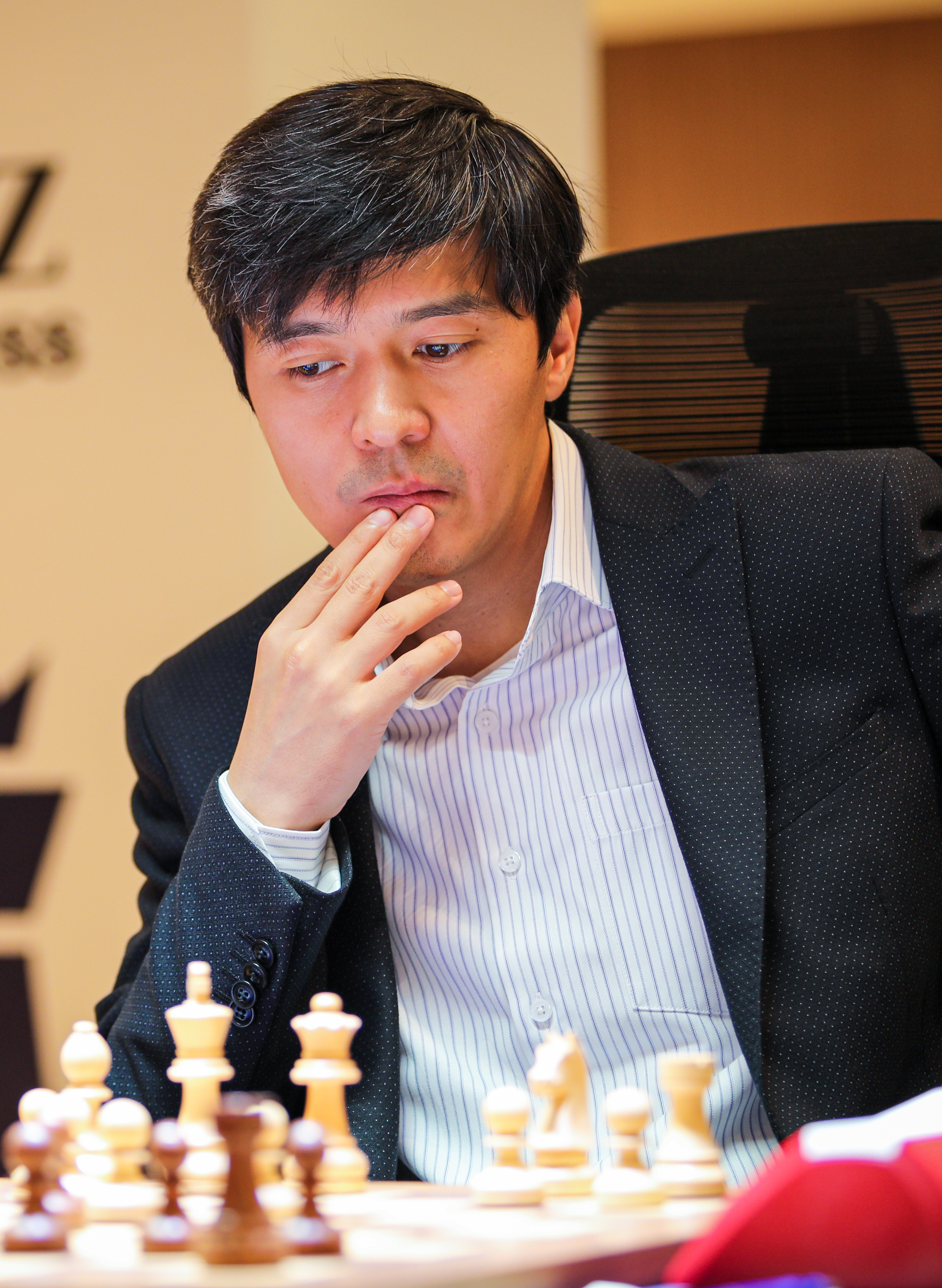
- Jumabayev in 2026

Personal information
- Born: 23 July 1989 (age 36) Shymkent, Kazakh SSR, Soviet Union

Chess career
- Country: Kazakhstan
- Title: Grandmaster (2009)
- FIDE rating: 2565 (July 2026)
- Peak rating: 2658 (October 2021)
- Peak ranking: No. 79 (October 2021)

Rinat Jūmabaev (Note: Often transliterated as Rinat Dzhumabaev through a Russified Romanization of Ринат Джумабаев.) (Kazakh: Ринат Жұмабаев; born 23 July 1989) is a Kazakhstani chess player. He was awarded the title of Grandmaster by FIDE in 2009.

== Biography ==
Many times Jumabayev represented Kazakhstan at the Asian Youth Chess Championships and World Youth Chess Championships in different age categories. He won the Kazakhstani Chess Championship in 2014, and has also won two silver (2010, 2011), and two bronze (2007, 2013) medals.

Jumabayev has played for Kazakhstan in four Chess Olympiads (2012, 2016, 2018, and 2022) and the Asian Team Chess Championship in 2012.

In 2005, Jumabayev won the international chess tournament in Mezhdurechensk. He completed the norms required for the Grandmaster title in Zvenigorod (2008), Moscow (2009) and Gyumri (2009). In 2009, he took 3rd place in the Asian zonal tournament for Chess World Cup in Tashkent. In 2010, Jumabayev shared 1st place in Georgy Agzamov memorial in Tashkent. In 2011, he took 4th place in Asian Chess Championship in Mashhad. In 2011, Jumabayev lost in the first round to Laurent Fressinet in Chess World Cup. In 2012, he shared 3rd place in the Mikhail Chigorin memorial in Saint Petersburg. In 2013 he shared 1st place in Pavlodar. In 2015, Jumabayev won 3rd prize in Riga Technical University Open.

Jumabayev caused a major upset by eliminating Fabiano Caruana, then ranked #2 in the world, in the third round of the Chess World Cup 2021. Jumabayev was eliminated in the following round by Sam Shankland.

In 2024, Jumabaev won the Open Master Tournament at the Biel International Chess Festival.
