= Milan Zajić =

Serbian chess grandmaster (born 1999)

Personal information
- Born: January 11, 1999 (age 27) Kruševac, Serbia, FR Yugoslavia

Chess career
- Country: Serbia
- Title: Grandmaster (2016)
- Peak rating: 2513 (January 2017)

Milan Zajić is a Serbian chess grandmaster.

== Chess career ==
He began playing chess at the age of 6 after his grandfather taught him and his brother the rules of the game.

In December 2013, he won the silver medal in the U14 World Youth Chess Championship.

In February 2015, he won the Georgi Tringov Memorial Open Tournament in Plovdiv, Bulgaria.

In May 2015, he became the youngest Serbian grandmaster after winning the Selimir Manojlović Memorial.

In 2017, he won the 3rd World Interuniversities championship in Barcelona.
