= Pavel Ponkratov =

Russian chess grandmaster (born 1988)

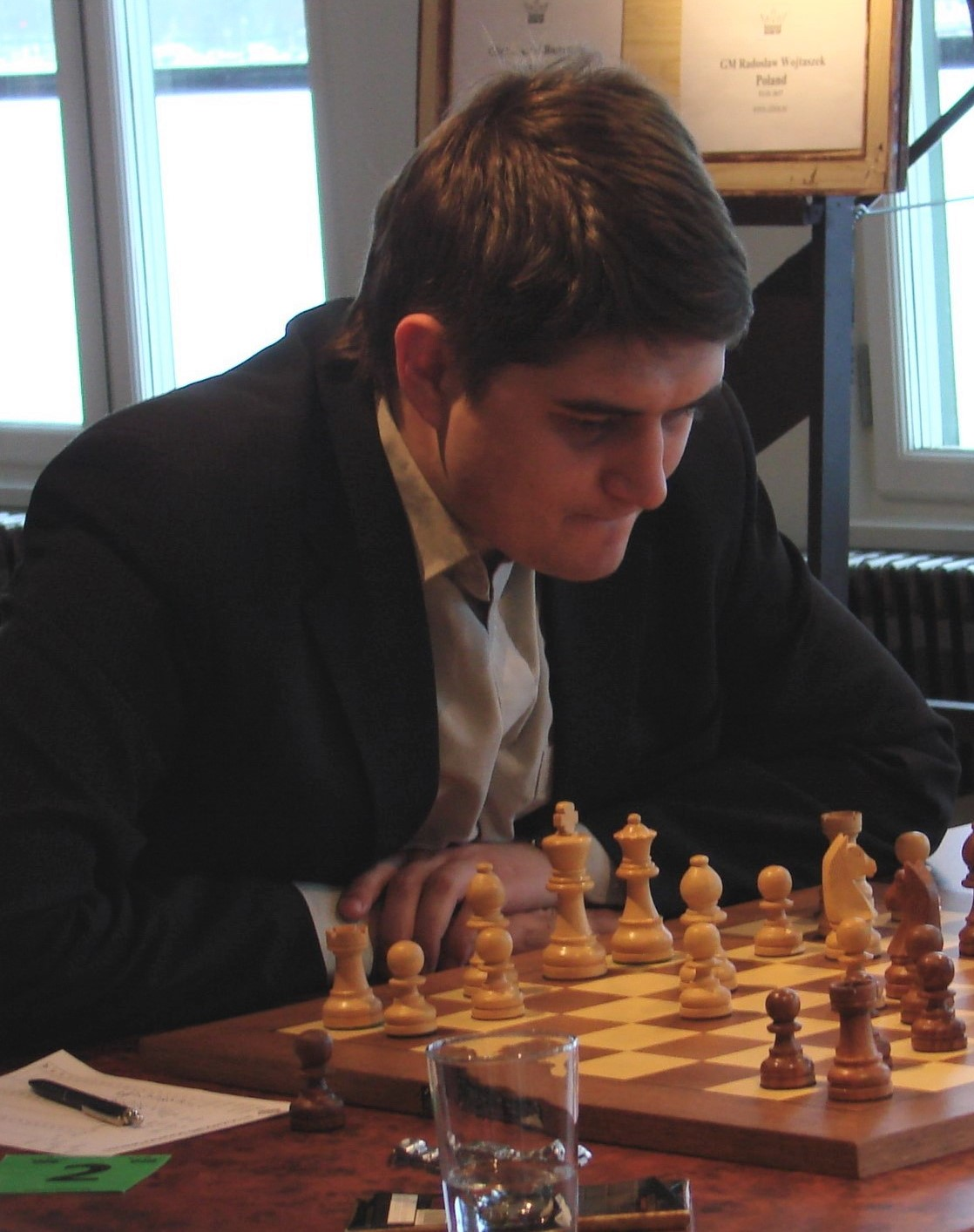
- Ponkratov at Rilton Cup Stockholm 2009/10

Personal information
- Born: 15 July 1988 (age 37)

Chess career
- Country: Russia
- Title: Grandmaster (2010)
- FIDE rating: 2538 (July 2026)
- Peak rating: 2662 (November 2021)
- Peak ranking: No. 77 (October 2021)

Pavel Andreevich Ponkratov (born 15 July 1988) is a Russian chess player. He was awarded the title Grandmaster by FIDE in 2010.

Together with 43 other Russian chess players, Ponkratov signed an open letter to Russian president Vladimir Putin, protesting against the 2022 Russian invasion of Ukraine and expressing solidarity with the Ukrainian people.

== Career ==
In July 2020, Ponkratov won the International Chess Open "Ciudad de Leon". In January 2021, he won the Chennai Open. In April 2021, he won the Chelyabinskiy Variant A.

He participated in the Chess World Cup 2021.

In 2022, he won the 1st Guwahati GM chess championship on tie-break with Adham Fawzy with a score 8.5/10.
