= Dambasürengiin Batsüren =

Mongolian chess grandmaster (born 2004)

Dambasurengiin Batsuren
Personal information
- Born: 22 January 2004 (age 22) Ulaanbaatar, Mongolia

Chess career
- Country: Mongolia
- Title: Grandmaster (2020)
- FIDE rating: 2504 (July 2026)
- Peak rating: 2537 (February 2025)

Dambasurengiin Batsuren (Mongolian: Дамбасүрэнгийн Батсүрэн; born 2004), is a Mongolian chess player. He was Candidate Master (CM) in 2014, FIDE Master (FM) in 2015, International Master (IM) 2017. He was awarded the title of Grandmaster in 2020. As of December 2025, he is the highest ranked player in Mongolia.

== Career ==
He has qualified to play in the Chess World Cup 2021 by winning the Mongolian qualifying event. In 2022, he won Mongolian Chess Championship.
