= Kirill Shubin =

Russian chess grandmaster (born 2003)

Personal information
- Born: 2 April 2003 (age 23) Vladivostok, Russia

Chess career
- Country: Russia
- Title: Grandmaster (2026)
- FIDE rating: 2490 (July 2026)
- Peak rating: 2505 (August 2022)

Kirill Eduardovich Shubin (Russian: Кирилл Эдуардович Шубин; born 2 April 2003) is a Russian chess grandmaster.

== Biography ==
Kirill Shubin started playing chess at the age of six. He was a Vladivostok chess school student, but in 2015 moved to life in Saint Petersburg.

In 2014 he won the Vladivostok City Chess Open Championship. In 2015, he won the Saint Petersburg City Chess and Rapid Chess Championships in the U15 age group, but in Saint Petersburg City Blitz Chess Championship the U15 age group was second.

Kirill Shubin repeatedly represented Russia at the European Youth Chess Championships and World Youth Chess Championships in different age groups, where he won gold medal in 2015 in Poreč at the European Youth Chess Championship in the U12 age group. In 2014, he won World Schools Rapid Chess Championship in the U11 age group.

In 2019, Kirill Shubin receive FIDE International Master (IM) title.
