= Arik Braun =

German chess grandmaster (born 1988)

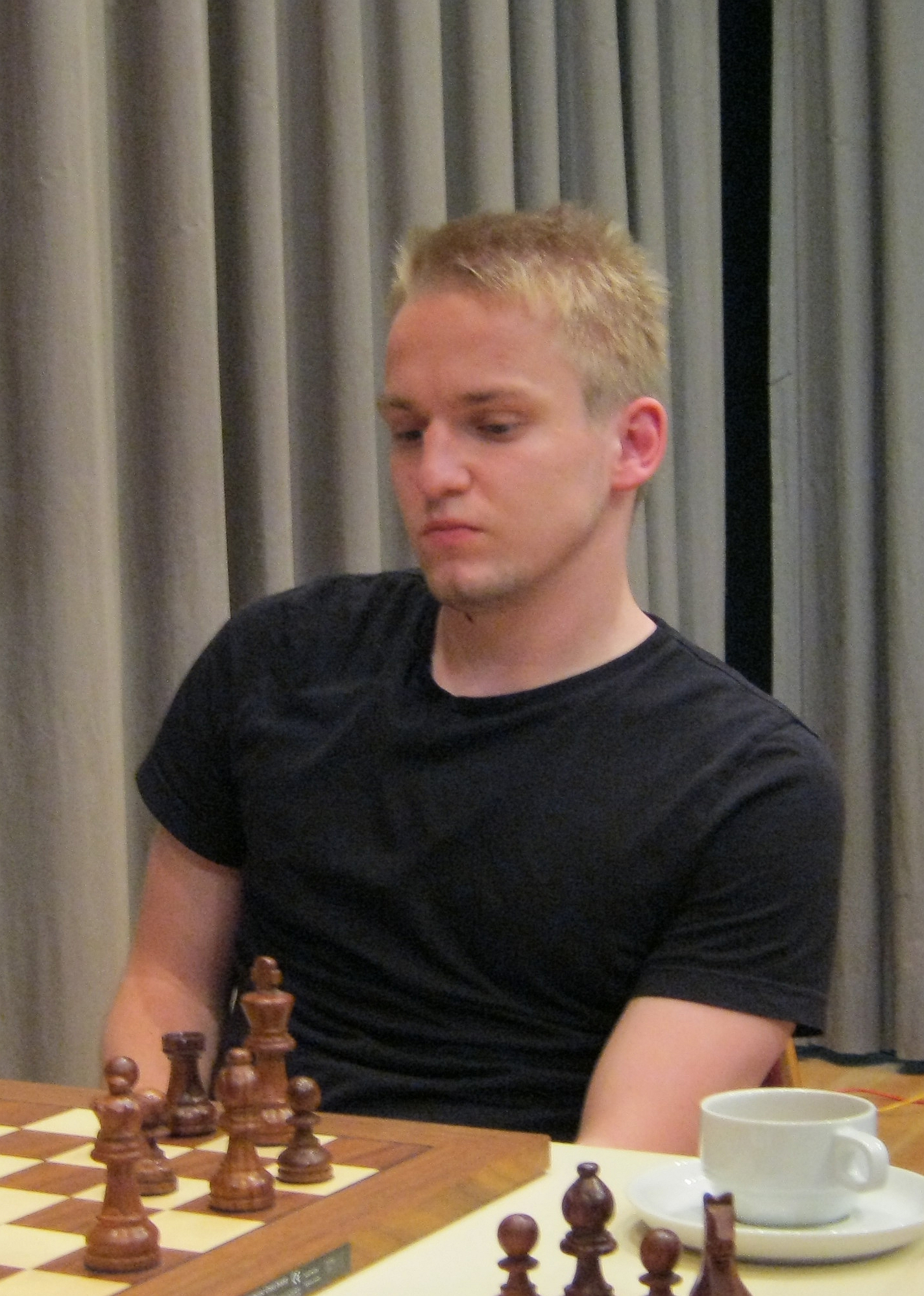

Personal information
- Born: 8 February 1988 (age 38) Aresing, West Germany

Chess career
- Country: Germany
- Title: Grandmaster (2008)
- FIDE rating: 2587 (July 2026)
- Peak rating: 2609 (February 2020)

Arik Braun (born 8 February 1988) is a German chess grandmaster and the world's first chessboxer of Grandmaster strength.

== Chess career ==
He won the World Under-18 Chess Championship in 2006 and the German Chess Championship in 2009. Braun was the bronze medalist at the World Junior Chess Championship of 2008, held in Gaziantep.
