= Sanan Sjugirov =

Russian-Hungarian chess grandmaster (born 1993)

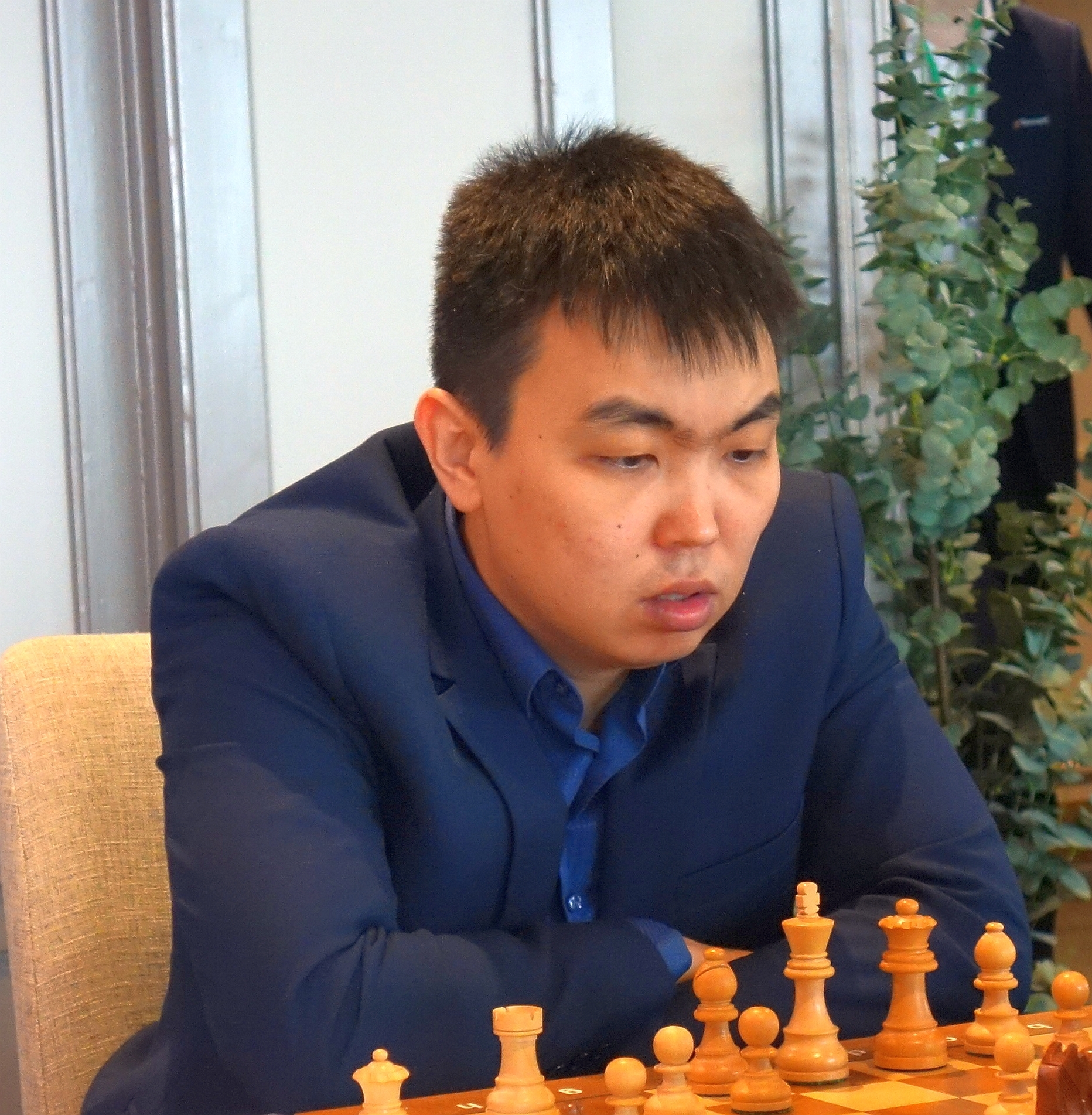
- Sjugirov in 2019

Personal information
- Born: 31 January 1993 (age 33) Elista, Russia

Chess career
- Country: Russia (until 2023); Hungary (since 2023)
- Title: Grandmaster (2009)
- FIDE rating: 2544 (July 2026)
- Peak rating: 2712 (November 2022)
- Peak ranking: No. 28 (May 2023)

Sanan Vyacheslavovich Sjugirov (Russian: Санан Сюгиров; born 31 January 1993) is a Russian chess grandmaster who represents Hungary. He was European champion and world champion in his age category. Sjugirov competed in the FIDE World Cup in 2009 and 2015.

== Chess career ==
Sjugirov won the World Youth Chess Championships in 2003, in the U-10 section, and 2007, in the U-14. In the European Youth Chess Championships, he won in the U-12 division in 2004 and 2005, and in the U-14 in 2007. In 2008, Sjugirov won the Russian U-20 Championship and the First Saturday GM tournament of May in Budapest.

In 2009, he qualified, through the Higher League, to the Superfinal of the Russian Chess Championship, where he was the youngest participant. He scored 3 points from 9 games. Sjugirov played for team "Russia 4" on the first board at the 2010 Chess Olympiad in Khanty-Mansiysk, where he defeated Magnus Carlsen among others. Sjugirov tied for first with Dmitry Andreikin in the World Junior Chess Championship of 2010, placing second on tiebreak.

Sjugirov won the silver medal at the 2011 European Rapid Chess Championship in Warsaw. In 2012 he won the Casino de Barcelona round-robin tournament in Barcelona with a score of 7/9 points.

In 2013, Sjugirov won the 29th Cappelle-la-Grande Open on tiebreak scoring 7/9. In 2014 he won the Lev Polugaevsky Memorial in Samara on tiebreak over Alexey Goganov and the World University Chess Championship in Katowice. In the same year Sjugirov finished fourth in the strong Qatar Masters Open, behind Yu Yangyi, Anish Giri and Vladimir Kramnik respectively.

In August 2015, he won the Abu Dhabi Blitz tournament with a score of 9½/11. In October 2015, he won the 1st European Universities Chess Championship in Yerevan, helping his team USMU (Ural State Mining University) to win the team gold medal. Two months later, he took part in the second edition of the Qatar Masters Open, where he tied for third place with Vladimir Kramnik, Sergey Karjakin, Ni Hua and Vassily Ivanchuk, finishing fifth on tiebreak.

In March 2016, Sjugirov tied for 3rd–10th in the Aeroflot Open, placing fourth on tiebreak. The following year, he tied 1st–2nd with Daniil Dubov in the Russian Higher League in Sochi, taking second place on tiebreak.
