= Viktor Erdős =

Hungarian chess player

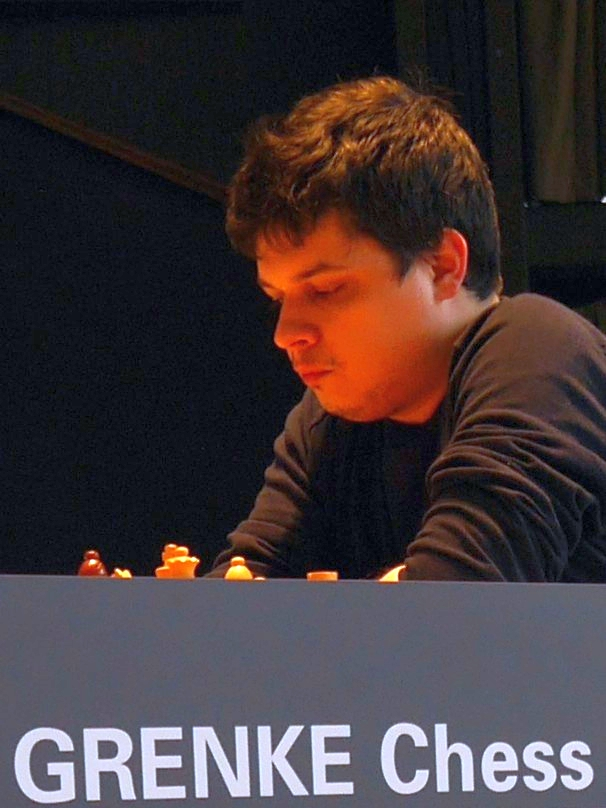
- Erdős at the Grenke Chess Open in 2017

Personal information
- Born: 2 September 1987 (age 38)

Chess career
- Country: Hungary
- Title: Grandmaster (2007)
- FIDE rating: 2552 (July 2026)
- Peak rating: 2661 (October 2013)
- Peak ranking: No. 87 (December 2013)

Viktor Erdős (born 2 September 1987) is a Hungarian chess grandmaster. He won the Hungarian Chess Championship in 2011.

== Chess career ==
Erdős was awarded the grandmaster title in 2007.

He qualified for the Chess World Cup 2017, where he defeated Bassem Amin in the first round, but was defeated by Peter Svidler in the second round.
