= Women's event at the 42nd Chess Olympiad =

- Host city: Baku
- Country: Azerbaijan
- Nations: 138
- Teams: 142
- Athletes: 693
- Dates: 2–13 September 2016
- Main venue: Baku Crystal Hall

Medalists

Team
- 1st place, gold medalist(s): China
- 2nd place, silver medalist(s): Poland
- 3rd place, bronze medalist(s): Ukraine

Individual
- Board 1: (Ukraine) Anna Muzychuk
- Board 2: (Russia) Valentina Gunina
- Board 3: (Azerbaijan) Gulnar Mammadova
- Board 4: (China) Tan Zhongyi
- Reserve: (China) Guo Qi

The women's event at the 42nd Chess Olympiad, organised by the Fédération Internationale des Échecs (FIDE), was held from 2–13 September 2016 in Baku, Azerbaijan. It is contested by a record number of 142 teams representing 138 nations. Azerbaijan, as host nation, field three teams, whilst the International Physically Disabled Chess Association (IPCA) and the International Chess Committee of the Deaf (ICCD) each provide one team. A total number of 693 players are participating in the women's event.

China won the gold medal in the women's event, their first since 1994 and their fifth overall. Russian Valentina Gunina, playing on board two, was the best individual player in the women's event with 8 out of 10 points (seven wins, two draws and one loss) with a performance rating of 2643. The gold medals on the other boards were won by Anna Muzychuk of Ukraine on board one, Gulnar Mammadova of Azerbaijan on board three, Tan Zhongyi of China on board four, and Guo Qi of China as a reserve player.

== Competition format and calendar ==
The tournament was played in a Swiss system format. The time control for all games was 90 minutes for the first 40 moves, after which an additional 30 minutes were granted and increment of 30 seconds per move was applied. Players were permitted to offer a draw at any time. A total of 11 rounds were played, with all teams playing in every round.

In each round, four players from each team faced four players from another team; teams were permitted one reserve player who could be substituted between rounds. The four games were played simultaneously on four boards, scoring 1 game point for a win and ½ game point for a draw. The scores from each game were summed together to determine which team won the round. Winning a round was worth 2 match points, regardless of the game point margin, while drawing a round was worth 1 match point. Teams were ranked in a table based on match points. Tie-breakers for the table were i) Sonneborn–Berger score; ii) total game points scored; iii) the sum of the match points of the opponents, excluding the lowest one.

Tournament rounds started on 2 September and ended with the final round on 13 September. All rounds start at 15:00 AZST (UTC+5), except for the final round which will start at 11:00 AZST (UTC+5). There was one rest day at the tournament, on 7 September after the fifth round.

All dates are AZST (UTC+5)

1	Round	RD	Rest day

September	2nd Fri	3rd Sat	4th Sun	5th Mon	6th Tue	7th Wed	8th Thu	9th Fri	10th Sat	11th Sun	12th Mon	13th Tue
Tournament round	1	2	3	4	5	RD	6	7	8	9	10	11

== Teams and players ==
Eight of the top ten players from the FIDE women's rating list published in August 2016 were playing in the women's event with only India's Humpy Koneru and Russia's Kateryna Lagno not playing. The current Women's World Champion and highest rated woman Hou Yifan was playing on board one for China, while former Women's World Champions Antoaneta Stefanova, Alexandra Kosteniuk, Anna Ushenina and Mariya Muzychuk were also part of their national teams.

The top seed in the women's event were China with an average rating of 2528. They were led by the Women's World Champion Hou Yifan on board one, along with Zhao Xue, Ju Wenjun, Tan Zhongyi and Guo Qi. The reigning champions Russia have the second highest average rating. They were led by Alexandra Kosteniuk and were playing with the same players as in the previous Olympiad, where the only difference was the induction of Aleksandra Goryachkina instead of the absent Kateryna Lagno. Ukraine and Georgia were the other two teams with average rating higher than 2400. The Ukrainian team consisted of most Grandmasters (four) and Women's World Champions (two), and included both Anna and Mariya Muzychuk playing on the top two boards, Anna Ushenina, Natalia Zhukova and Inna Gaponenko. Georgia were led by the best individual player in the women's event of the Chess Olympiad in Tromsø in 2014 Nana Dzagnidze, and also had Lela Javakhishvili, Nino Batsiashvili, Bela Khotenashvili and Salome Melia on the team.

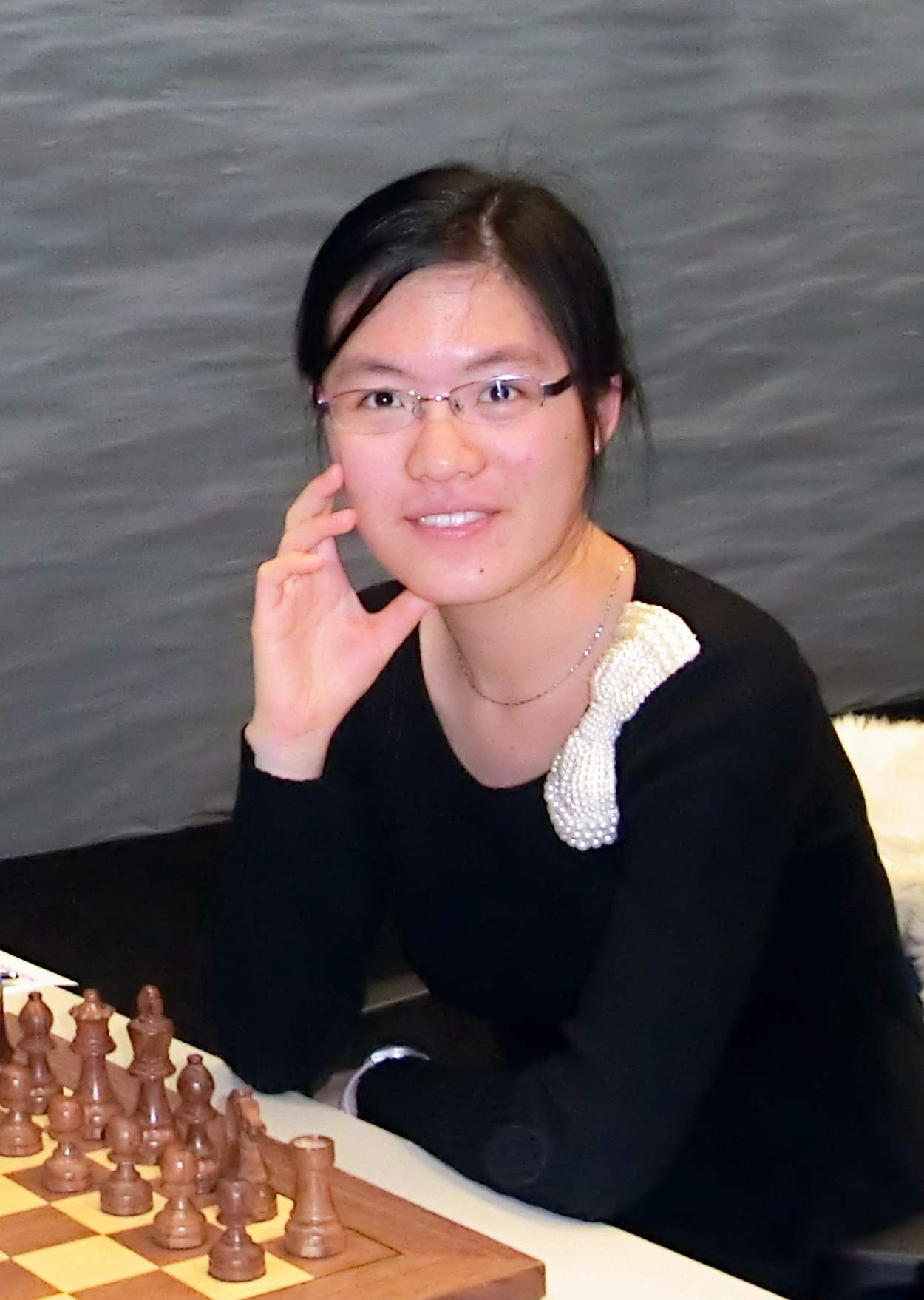
Women's World Champion and women's world no. 1 Hou Yifan was playing on board one for China

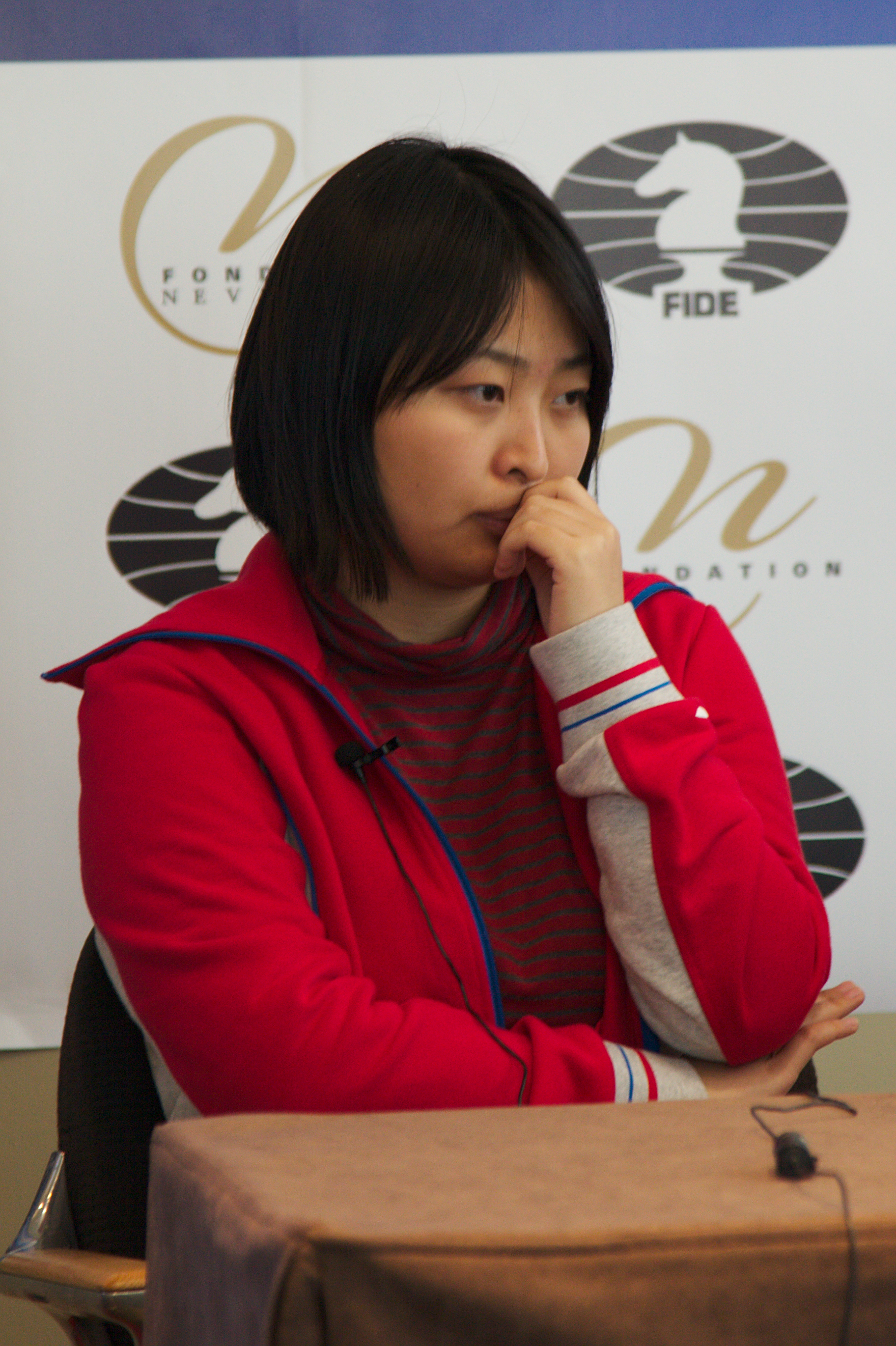
Women's world no. 3 Ju Wenjun is playing on board three for China

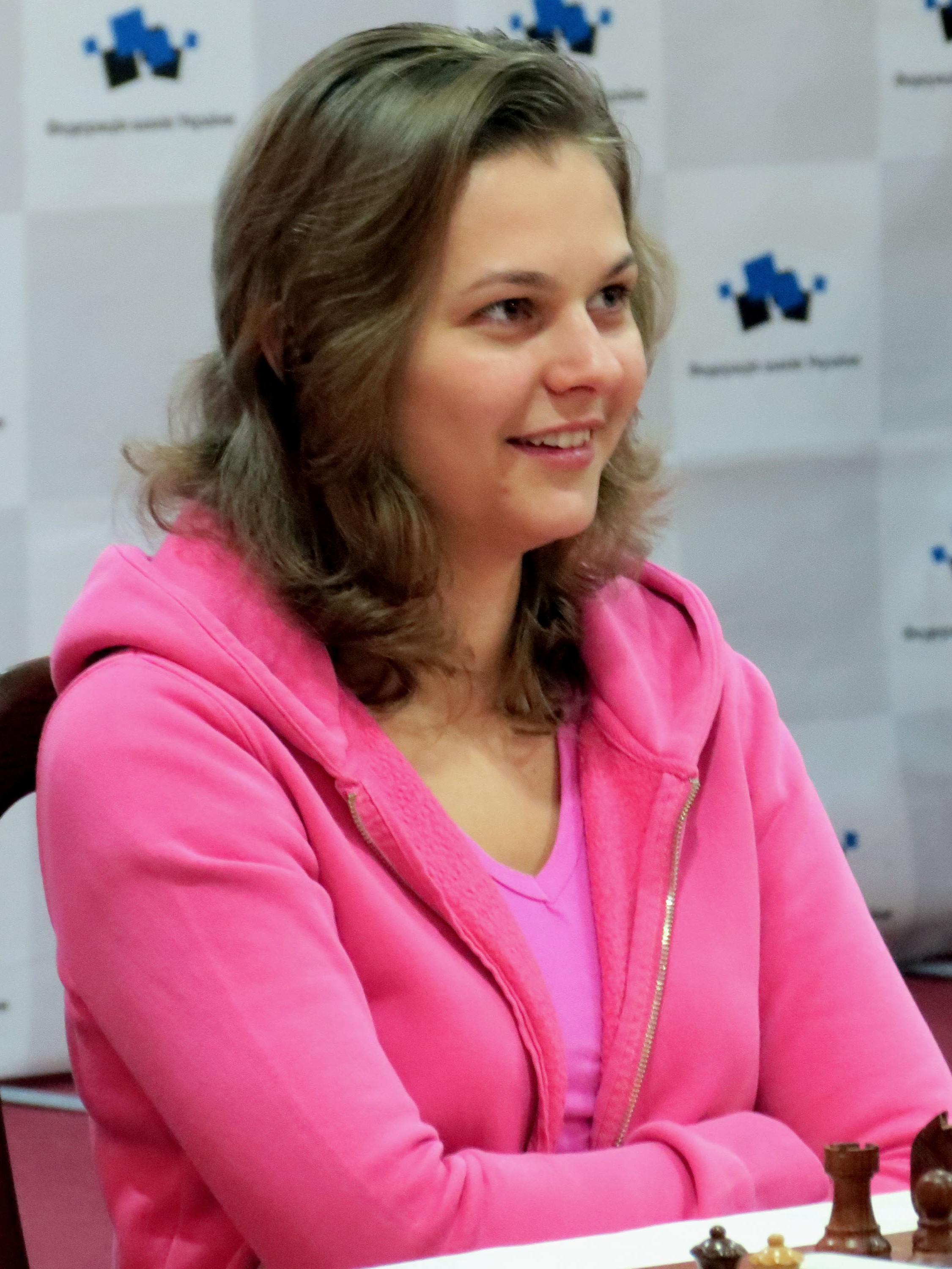
Women's world no. 4 Anna Muzychuk was playing on board one for Ukraine

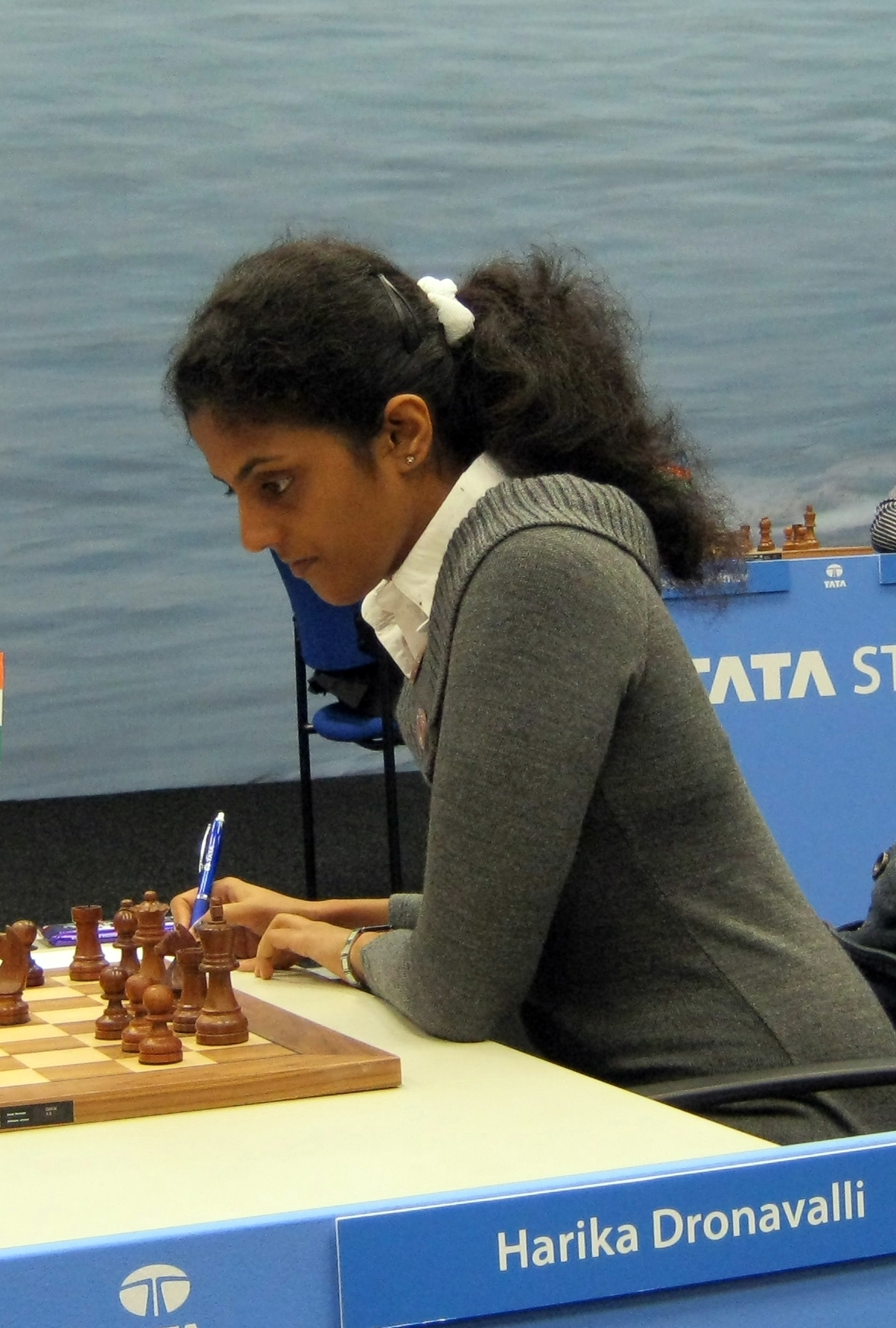
Women's world no. 5 Harika Dronavalli was playing on board one for India

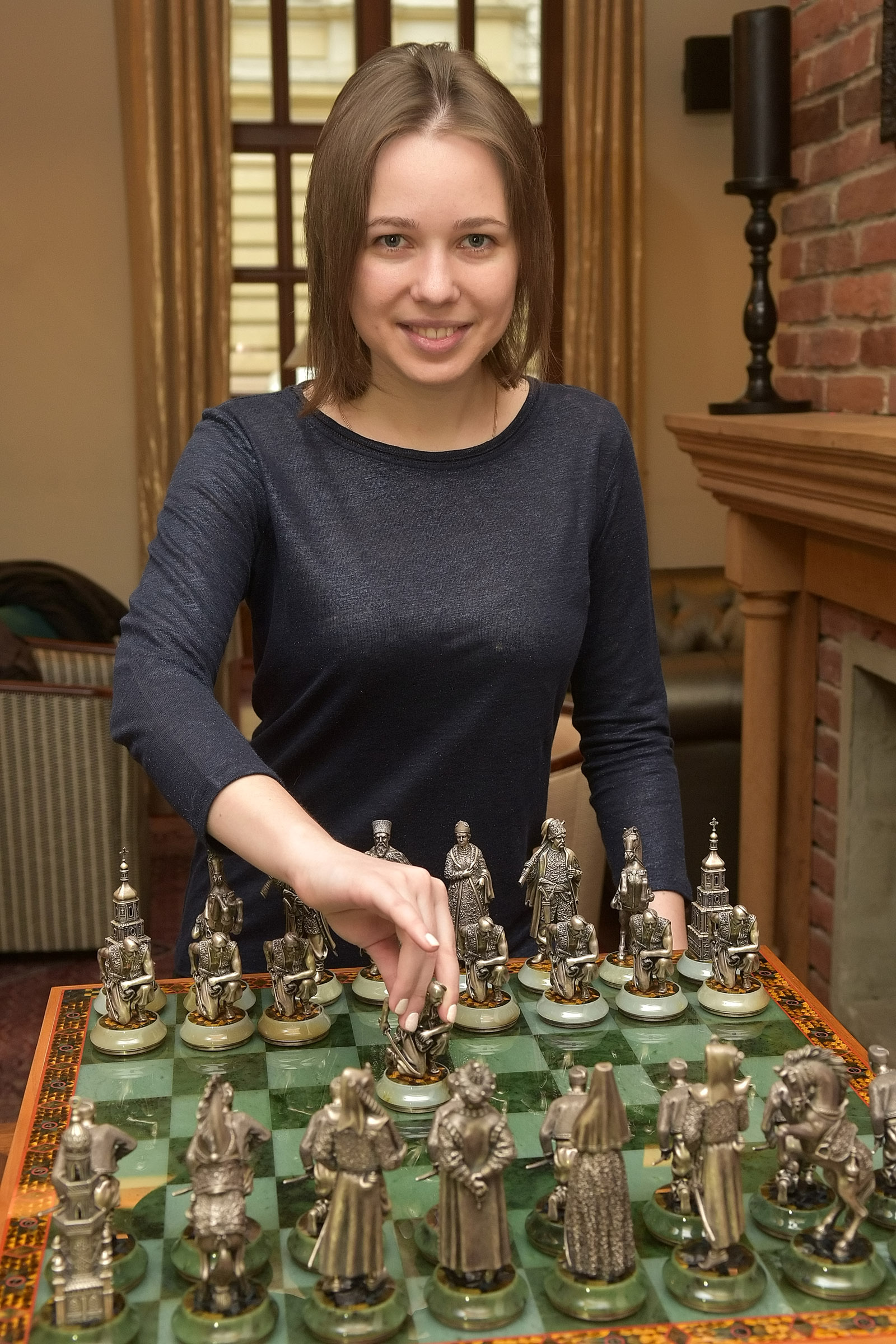
Former Women's World Champion and world no. 6 Mariya Muzychuk was playing on board two for Ukraine

== Rounds ==
=== Round 1 ===
The most common result in the matches of the opening round was 4–0. Top five seeded teams, China, Ukraine, Russia, Georgia and India swept Luxembourg, Portugal, Scotland, the ICCD and Macedonia, respectively. All three teams of the host-nation Azerbaijan also had perfect scores as Azerbaijan-1 and Azerbaijan-2 defeated Nicaragua and Japan, respectively, while Azerbaijan-3 won their match again Lesotho without playing, because Lesothan players had not arrived yet. The only close match was Greece's win against Sri Lanka 2½–1½. Three of the world's top four players, Hou Yifan, Anna Muzychuk and Harika Dronavalli, did not play in the first round. Natalia Zhukova and Inna Gaponenko from Ukraine, playing with the White pieces on boards 2 and 4, respectively, won nicely with sacrificial combinations targeting the square g7 in Ukraine's whitewash of Portugal.

=== Round 2 ===
Fronda vs. Khotenashvili

Position: c7 black pawn, d7 black king, h6 black pawn, a5 black pawn, d5 black pawn, a4 white pawn, f4 white king, b3 white pawn, f3 white pawn, f2 white pawn, h2 white pawn

Khotenashvili blundered this position by playing 31... Ke6??. Fronda correctly followed the game with 32. b4!! to get a winning position in which her opponent could not stop both the a-pawn and the f-pawn.

The number of teams continuing their winning streak from the first round reduced to 20 with only five, China, Russia, Lithuania, Italy and France, scoring 8 of 8. China and Russia recorded another clear sweeps against Montenegro and Ecuador, respectively, while Ukraine were cut off half point by Moldova after Anna Muzychuk drew her game with the White pieces against Diana Baciu on board one. United States beat Norway by a minimal margin in an interesting match with three draws and American Women's Champion Nazí Paikidze scoring the only win with a spirited attack as Black. Bulgaria's Antoaneta Stefanova won her game with the Black pieces against Oksana Vovk on board one, yet her team played 2–2 with Denmark, because Iva Videnova and Adriana Nikolova lost their games on the next two boards. Spain were also surprisingly held to a 2–2 tie against Estonia.

The biggest upset of the day, however, was Georgia's loss to the 46th seeds the Philippines 2½-1½. Nino Batsiashvili beat Christy Lamiel Bernales as White on board three and Nana Dzagnidze drew Janelle Mae Frayna on board one. The disappointment for the Georgian team came from boards 2 and 4. Bela Khotenashvili brought the game against Jan Jodilyn Fronda to a positionally won rook endgame but then she threw it away to a drawn endgame before making a blunder on move 31 that costed her the game (see diagram). Fronda's win was her first against a grandmaster in her life. She said she had not expected her preparation would come in the game and added that had not expected to beat a grandmaster. The match was tied with only game ongoing, the one between Catherine Secopito and Salome Melia. Secopito was offered a draw in a position with winning advantage that would have led the match to end in a tie. Then, she asked her coach how a draw would impact the team, which is allowed by the rules at the Olympiads, and he encouraged her by saying to "just play". She later managed to convert her advantage to a full point to secure the win for her team. After the round, Philippine team captain Jayson Gonzales said that the team lack exposure and that their rating is relative of their strength. He added that their rating is plus 300 from the published number and that they had shown they could compete.

Harika Dronavalli was the last still playing her game for India, who had already secured the win against Brazil with three wins on the boards 2–4. Nevertheless, it seemed like she forgot about the clock and lost on time in an endgame with better position to Brazil's Juliana Terao.

=== Round 3 ===
Abdumalik vs. Stefanova

Position: a8 black rook, b8 black knight, c8 black bishop, f8 black queen, h8 black king, c7 black pawn, a6 black pawn, b6 black pawn, e6 black pawn, g6 black pawn, h6 black pawn, d5 black pawn, e5 white pawn, f5 black rook, a4 white pawn, h4 white pawn, c3 white knight, e3 white bishop, g3 white pawn, b2 white pawn, c2 white pawn, f2 white pawn, a1 white rook, d1 white queen, e1 white rook, g1 white king

Abdumalik sacrificed a piece for two pawns in this position by playing 18. Nxd5!?, which earned her a powerful attack on the kingside. Her decision later paid off as she managed to win the game.

The matches of round three saw Russia and Ukraine continuing their winning streak, while China were halted to a 2–2 tie by Vietnam. France did also proceed on the winning run with a third consecutive match win for a remarkable 11½ out of 12 board points. The number of teams winning their first three matches fell down to 13.

Russia defeated Uzbekistan 3-1 thanks to the wins on the first two boards by Alexandra Kosteniuk as White against Nafisa Muminova and Valentina Gunina as Black against Gulrukhbegim Tokhirjonova. Ukraine had a more serious opponent in the United States and entered the match with the strongest line-up. The games on the first three boards between Irina Krush and Mariya Muzychuk, Nazí Paikidze and Anna Muzychuk, and Anna Zatonskih and Natalia Zhukova were all drawn; the only decisive game appeared on board four, where Anna Ushenina beat Kateřina Němcová to give Ukraine a narrow win by 2½-1½. Hou Yifan played her first game at the Olympiad and won against Vietnamese Phạm Lê Thảo Nguyên. Her win, however, was not enough for China to snatch the match win as Zhao Xue suffered a loss with the White pieces from Nguyễn Thị Mai Hưng on the third board and the other two games were drawn. Georgia recovered from the shocking loss to the Philippines in the previous round to convincingly beat Estonia 3½-½, in a match with only Lela Javakhishvili failing to win her game against Monika Tsõganova. The Philippines were out of the form against Georgia and were doused by the strong Indian team with 3½-½, though Janelle May Frayna showed consistency and held a drew to Harika Dronavalli.

Besides the tie of the Chinese team, surprising results occurred in some other matches. One of the biggest upsets of the day was Bulgaria, who were beaten by lower-rated Kazakhstan. The victory of the Kazakh team was supported by Zhansaya Abdumalik's win over the former Women's World Champion Antoaneta Stefanova with a powerful long-term sacrifice (see diagram). The strongest of the Azerbaijani teams edged out the higher-rated Polish team 2½-1½ after Zeinab Mamedyarova beat Monika Soćko with the Black pieces on the top board and Gunay Mammadzada defeated Jolanta Zawadzka on the second board. Azerbaijan-2 also remained unbeaten against a higher-rated team as they held Germany to a 2–2 tie. Another surprising result was also Iceland's minimal win over England, in which the Icelandic players were efficient with the White pieces as Lenka Ptáčníková and Hallgerður Þorsteinsdóttir beat Jovanka Houska and Sarah Longson, respectively.

=== Round 4 ===
Reizniece-Ozola vs. Hou

Position: e8 black rook, e7 black rook, g7 black bishop, h7 black king, b6 black pawn, e6 black pawn, h6 black knight, c5 black pawn, f5 black pawn, h5 white queen, a4 white pawn, c4 white pawn, d4 black pawn, f4 black queen, h4 white knight, b3 white pawn, d3 white pawn, h3 white bishop, e2 white rook, e1 white rook, g1 white king

In this position, Reizniece-Ozola went for simplification with 39. Bxf5+!, forcing 39... exf5 40. Rxe7 Qg3+ 41. Ng2 Rxe7 42. Rxe7 with a winning attack.

The pairings in the fourth round resulted in interesting matches involving strong teams. Ukraine, Serbia, Russia and Kazakhstan remained the only teams with four match victories. Russia narrowly beat Hungary on the top match board with draws on the first three boards and a single win by Natalija Pogonina over Anita Gara. The game on the first board between Hoang Thanh Trang and Alexandra Kosteniuk may have directly affected the match outcome but the Russian closely escaped from an inferior position with a pawn down in the endgame. On the second match board, Ukraine faced France, who had arrived at the Chess Olympiad without their top two players Marie Sebag and Almira Skripchenko. The French team was additionally weakened for the match, because their highest rated player in the tournament Sophie Milliet was given a day off. Under these circumstances, the Ukrainian team snatched a convincing 3½-½ victory with wins by the Muzychuk sisters and Natalia Zhukova on the first three boards. Serbia and Kazakhstan started the tournament as 27th and 31st seeds, respectively but continued their perfect match score in the fourth round to join Ukraine and Russia on the top. Serbia's Jovana Rapport lost to Pia Cramling on board one but her teammates dominated on the other boards to give her team a 3–1 win against Sweden. Kazakhstan closely won the clash with Lithuania 2½-1½.

Following the surprising tie with Vietnam in the previous round, the Chinese team bounced back with a minimal win against Latvia thanks to the wins with the White pieces by Ju Wenjun against Laura Rogule and Guo Qi against Elina Otikova. However, the biggest attention in the match and perhaps the whole day overall was attached to the first board, where Latvian Dana Reizniece-Ozola (the country's Minister of Finance at the time) outplayed the current Women's World Champion Hou Yifan. The World champion was out of inertia and committed herself to mistakes that brought her to a hopeless position, leaving the opponent with a kingside attack that could have not been stopped (see diagram). Prior to the Olympiad, the Latvian modestly commented in an interview about their chances:

What can we expect from it? They say that you have to shoot for the stars to get to the moon. However, an objective assessment of the situation is that we’re not ready to win medals, but we’ll work with a common goal – to represent Latvia strongly, sincerely and vigorously. Remember a rule that doesn’t disappoint: If you’ve done everything in your power, you also deserve good fortune.

In the other matches contested by teams who had perfect match scores in the first three rounds, India unexpectedly drew with Israel as well as Azerbaijan-1 with Romania, leaving all four teams unbeaten after four rounds.

=== Round 5 ===
Krush vs. Daulytė

Position: d8 black knight, e8 black rook, f8 black rook, g8 black king, a7 black pawn, b7 black pawn, d7 black queen, g7 black bishop, h7 black pawn, c6 black pawn, d6 black pawn, g6 black pawn, e5 black pawn, c4 white pawn, e4 white pawn, b3 white pawn, c3 white knight, d3 white pawn, f3 white pawn, g3 white pawn, a2 white pawn, b2 white bishop, d2 white queen, g2 white king, a1 white rook, e1 white rook

It seemed that Krush had almost consolidated her position but Dalyte played 20... Rxf3!!. The game continued with 21. Kxf3 Qh3!! 22. Ke2 Bh6 23. Qc2 Ne6 24. Kd1 Nd4 25. Qf2 Rf8 26. Qg1 Rf3 and Krush resigned.

The top two match boards in round five featured the four teams with a perfect score after the first four rounds playing among themselves. Ukraine beat Serbia 3-1 thanks to the wins by the Muzychuk sisters on the first two boards. Yet, they both had worse positions at some point during their games but managed to consolidate and even win. Anna Muzychuk had an inferior position with the Black pieces against Jovana Rapport until the Serbian decided to push the h-pawn and eventually got a position with a piece up for two pawns. Shortly after, Rapport played a blunder, which allowed Muzychuk to play a combination with a queen sacrifice that left her with a winning advantage. Mariya Muzychuk had a worse position throughout most of the game with the White pieces against Irina Chelushkina and even went into the endgame with an exchange down but managed to win the endgame after Chelushkina played some imprecise moves. Russia scored a convincing victory against Kazakhstan 3½-½. Alexandra Kosteniuk opened the scoring with a 30-move win as White against the 16-year old Zhansaya Abdumalik, who blundered a piece on move 29 and resigned after the opponent's next move. Valentina Gunina and Olga Girya completed the job adding two wins as Black.

Women's World Champion Hou Yifan scored a nice win over Olga Zimina after sacrificing two minor pieces for a strong attack against the uncastled Black king. Tan Zhongyi did also win her game as White against Daniela Movileanu to secure a 3–1 win for her team against Italy. Lithuania, who had arrived in Baku without their highest rated player Viktorija Čmilytė, faced the United States. Deimantė Daulytė beat Irina Krush with the Black pieces on board one in a flourishing game with a rook sacrifice that helped her cut off the opponent's king and prepare her pieces for the winning attack (see diagram). Nevertheless, the American players scored two wins on the bottom boards, where Anna Zatonskih and Sabina-Francesca Foisor defeated Daiva Batytė and Laima Domarkaitė, respectively, and subsequently edged out Lithuania 2½-1½. Azeribaijan-1 scored an important victory of 3–1 against higher-rated Germany as a result of two wins scored on the lower boards, where Gulnar Mammadova beat Elena Levushkina and Aydan Hojjatova defeated Judit Fuchs. India were trailing to Vietnam but Padmini Rout equalised for 2–2 in one of the longest games of the day.

=== Round 6 ===
Gunina vs. M. Muzychuk

Position: a8 black rook, e8 black king, a7 black pawn, b7 white queen, e7 black pawn, f7 black rook, h7 black pawn, c6 black pawn, e6 black knight, f6 black pawn, g6 black queen, h6 white bishop, d5 black bishop, g5 white pawn, d4 white knight, h3 white pawn, a1 white king, d1 white rook

Mariya Muzychuk blundered in this position with the rook move 35... Rd8??, falling into Gunina's drawing trap with perpetual check. The game continued with 36. Nxe6 Bxe6 37. Qxc6+ Bd7 38. Rxd7 Rxd7 39. Qc8+ Rd8 40. Qc6+ Rd7 41. Qc8+ and the draw was agreed.

The match of the day was played between the only teams with perfect scores, Russia and Ukraine, on the first match board. The Ukrainian players gained advantage on the first three boards, where Anna Muzychuk was playing versus Alexandra Kosteniuk as White, Mariya Muzychuk versus Valentina Gunina as Black and Natalia Zhukova versus Aleksandra Goryachkina as White. Nonetheless, Gunina found a miraculous resource and tricked her opponent in a position being a rook and three pawns down to survive with a perpetual check (see diagram); Zhukova also did not exploit her advantage and lost her extra pawn to a tactical oversight on move 27 that transposed the game into a drawn endgame. Yet, Anna Muzychuk succeeded to convert her advantage to a full point but Olga Girya was victorious for Russia against Anna Ushenina on the lowest board for a 2–2 tie, despite the fact she committed herself to a blunder and gave up a crucial pawn on move 40. On the second match board, Romania surprisingly halted the top-seeded China to draw thanks to the win by Corina Peptan over Ju Wenjun with the White pieces on board one. For the Chinese team, who lacked World Women's Champion Hou Yifan, the only win came from Guo Qi who beat Irina Bulmaga on board four.

On the next two match boards, Kazakhstan and Hungary drew in a winless match, while Azerbaijan-1 and Georgia exchanged one win each in another tie. Nana Dzagnidze scored a full point for Georgia Zeinab Mamedyarova as White on board one and Gulnar Mammadova beat Nino Batsiashvili as Black on board three. Thus, all four matches played on the top four match boards ended without winner. Poland were the team playing on the highest board who secured a match victory after beating Vietnam 3–1 in a match with four decisive games. Monika Soćko, Karina Szczepkowska-Horowska and Klaudia Kulon scored full points for Poland against Phạm Lê Thảo Nguyên, Nguyễn Thị Mai Hưng and Nguyễn Thị Thanh An; Hoàng Thị Bảo Trâm won against Jolanta Zawadzka to score the only point for Vietnam. Klaudia Kolun's win was sixth at the tournament, which put her in the lead with a perfect score. India minimally beat Latvia 2½-1½ thanks to the wins by Harika Dronavalli against Dana Reizniece-Ozola and Soumya Swaminathan against Ingūna Erneste.

=== Round 7 ===
Tan vs. Zhukova

Position: a8 black rook, e8 black rook, g8 black king, b7 black pawn, c7 black queen, f7 black pawn, g7 black bishop, a6 black pawn, d6 black pawn, g6 black pawn, h6 black pawn, c5 black pawn, d5 white pawn, e5 white bishop, a4 white pawn, b4 black knight, c4 white knight, e4 white pawn, c3 white knight, b2 white pawn, d2 white queen, f2 white pawn, g2 white pawn, h2 white pawn, e1 white rook, f1 white rook, g1 white king

In this position, Zhukova mistakenly took on e5 with the d-pawn by playing 20... dxe5? instead of with the bishop on g7 by 20... Bxe5. The game continued with 21. Rc1 Rad8 22. Rfd1 Kh7 23. d6 Qc6 24. d7 and the strong pawn on d7 earned Tan a winning advantage.

The two leading teams after six rounds, Russia and Ukraine, faced Poland and China on the top two tables. The Polish team managed to halt the Russians to a 2–2 tie. Valentina Gunina scored once again for Russia by beating Jolanta Zawadzka with the Black pieces in a game in which her opponent was standing well but made several blunders from moves 31-35 and resigned after the move 36, because the Russian spotted a nice attacking combination with a thematic queen sacrifice that would have left her with a rook and a pawn up. On the other hand, Karina Szczepkowska-Horowska levelled the result by beating the Russian champion Aleksandra Goryachkina also with the Black pieces after Goryachkina forced exchange of queens that put her in a passive position and allowed Szczepkowska-Horowska take full control of the two central files with the rooks. The Polish win did even have a chance to clinch a match victory but Alexandra Kosteniuk defended the rook endgame with a pawn down against Monika Soćko on board one. China minimally defeated Ukraine 2½-1½ thanks to the only decisive game in the match, in which Tan Zhongyi beat Natalia Zhukova as White. The game reached a position out of the opening with strong White pawn on d5, which posed problems for Black throughout most of the game. On move 20, Zhukova mistakenly took on e5 with her d-pawn instead of her bishop on g7, allowing Tan's White d-pawn to roll ahead. The only way to get rid of the strong pawn was to sacrifice an exchange but it resulted in a winning endgame for the Chinese (see diagram).

United States beat Romania 2½-1½ with the only decisive game being played on the second board, where Nazí Paikidze beat Cristina Adela Foișor with the Black pieces after the Romanian played some imprecise moves that left her with weak pawns on b3 and e3 as well as passive set-up of her pieces, allowing Paikidze to launch a strong attack that could not be defended. After the game, Paikidze said that she had played the best game so far and realised that she had to win the game. Azerbaijan-1 surprised the fifth seeds India with a 2½-1½ victory as a result of the two wins scored by Gunay Mammadzada on the second and Gulnar Mammadova on the third board. The Netherlands upset the fourth seeded Georgia with the same result in a match with one decisive game by Tea Bosboom-Lanchava who beat Bela Khotenashvili on board three to score her fifth win in six games. Germany and Uzbekistan drew with four decisive games, while Turkmenistan surprised Greece with a 3–1 win.

=== Round 8 ===
Hou vs. Mamedyarova

Position: b8 black queen, c8 black bishop, d8 black rook, g8 black king, a7 black pawn, f7 black pawn, g7 black pawn, h7 black pawn, b6 black pawn, e6 black pawn, d5 black knight, d4 white bishop, a3 black bishop, b3 white pawn, d3 white pawn, g3 white pawn, d2 white knight, e2 white pawn, f2 white pawn, g2 white bishop, h2 white pawn, b1 white queen, d1 white rook, g1 white king

Hou found a nice tactics to win a pawn in this position with 19. Bxg7! Kxg7 20. Qa1+ Kg8 21, which she later managed to convert into a win. Mamedyarova resigned after 39 moves.

The eighth round saw Russia and the United States playing on the top table, which ended in favour of the American team who won 2½-1½. The quickest game to end was the one played on the fourth board, where Kateřina Němcová beat Olga Girya in a game that was opened with the French Defence and later reached a critical position in which Girya failed to implement the right plan. However, the Russians evened up the result in the match as Valentina Gunina scored a crushing win over Nazí Paikidze as Black on the second board. On the third board, Natalija Pogonina and Anna Zatonskih seemed to make little progress, despite the fact that Zatonskih had hanging pawns, and the game was drawn. The last game of the match was the one on the top board between Alexandra Kosteniuk and Irina Krush. Krush sacrificed a pawn on move 12, which she later said was not envisioned to be a pawn sacrifice but elimination of her bad pieces, and managed to get an equal compensation with her two knights. As the game reached the time control, Krush claimed a three-fold repetition, which Kosteniuk balked and the arbiters had to move the claim on a side table to confirm that the same position occurred two times and that the game could continue. Kosteniuk sacrificed an exchange in the continuation that left Krush with the winning chances she converted into a full point.

China convincingly beat Azerbaijan-1 3½-½ with three wins on the first, second and fourth board scored by Hou Yifan, Ju Wenjun and Tan Zhongyi against Zeinab Mamedyarova, Gunay Mammadzada and Narmin Kazimova, respectively. Hou found nice tactics to win a pawn on move 19, which she later converted into a full point (see diagram). Ju Wenjun scored a win with the Black pieces thanks to a strong knight on c4 and a passed pawn on e4, where the knight dominated on the quenside. Ukraine and Hungary played a match that ended in a tie with wins by Szidonia Vajda over Mariya Muzychuk with the Black pieces on board two for Hungary and Inna Gaponenko against Ticia Gara on board four for Ukraine. Poland beat the Netherlands minimally, despite Monika Soćko's loss to Anne Haast on the top board, as Klaudia Kulon and Mariola Wozniak were victorious on the lower boards. In the other games on the higher tables, Israel beat the 52nd seeds Turkmenistan 2½-1½, while Vietnam defeated Romania 3–1.

=== Round 9 ===
Tsolakidou vs. Čmilytė

Position: a8 black rook, c8 black bishop, e8 black king, h8 black rook, a7 black pawn, b7 black pawn, f7 black queen, g7 black bishop, d6 white bishop, f6 black knight, g6 black pawn, h6 black pawn, b5 white knight, d5 white pawn, e5 black pawn, f5 black pawn, c4 black knight, f4 white knight, h4 white pawn, e3 white pawn, g3 white queen, a2 white pawn, b2 white pawn, c2 white pawn, f2 white pawn, g2 white pawn, c1 white king, d1 white rook, h1 white rook

In this position, Čmilytė played 16. Ne4!! to start a mating attack that was followed by 17. Qxg6 exf4! 18. Nc7+ Kd8 19. Qxf7 Bxb2+ 20. Kb1 Nc3#.

The top five seeds, China, Ukraine, Russia, Georgia and India, all won their matches of the ninth round. China beat the United States 2½-1½ with three draws and one decisive game. Irina Krush neither get anything with the White pieces nor suffered in her game against Hou Yifan on board one that ended in a draw. On the third board, Anna Zatonskih had an advantage against Tan Zhongyi that she did not manage to convert; on the last board, Kateřina Němcová and Guo Qi also split the point. The decisive game was played on the second board, where Nazí Paikidze could not solve the problems on the c-file combined with her early exchange of bishop for a knight and lost the endgame. The win ensured China to solely top the standings after the end of the round. Russia retained the chances for gold after edging out Vietnam 2½-1½ thanks to the win by Valentina Gunina with the White pieces against Hoàng Thị Bảo Trâm on the second board. Gunina took control over the game, despite falling into a trouble after 19 moves, and scored a full point. It was her seventh point in the eighth game with a performance rating of 2707. Ukraine routed Azerbaijan-1 3½-½ with wins by the Muzychuk sisters on the first two boards and Inna Gaponenko on the last board.

Poland snatched a high 3½-½ victory on the second table against Israel to remain only a point behind the leader China after nine rounds. Monika Soćko, Jolanta Zawadzka and Mariola Wozniak won for the Polish team, while Klaudia Kulon was the only one halted to a draw. India stopped the Netherlands with a 3–1 victory in a match resulting in four decisive games. Harika Dronavalli, Tania Sachdev and Soumya Swaminathan scored wins for India on the first, third and forth board, respectively, while Anne Haast won for the Netherlands on the second board. Georgia beat Turkmenistan 3–1, while Germany defeated Serbia with the same result. The game between Bulgaria and Hungary ended 2–2 with four draws.

One of the most interesting games of the round was the one played on the first board in the match between Greece and Lithuania, in which Viktorija Čmilytė played a terrific idea from move 16 with a queen sacrifice in order to achieve a mate on the board after four moves in the game against Stavroula Tsolakidou (see diagram).

=== Round 10 ===
Davaademberel vs. Krush

Position: a8 black rook, d7 black king, f7 black pawn, b6 white rook, d6 black pawn, f6 black pawn, h6 black pawn, c5 white pawn, e5 black pawn, h5 white pawn, e4 white pawn, g4 white pawn, c3 white king, f3 white pawn

This is the position in which Krush opted for a passive defence by playing 49... Rc8?, which lead to immediate drop of the pawn on d6 with 50. Rxd6+ and a lost endgame. She resigned on the move 63.

The penultimate round featured six of the top seven teams in the standings after nine rounds playing each other. The match between the top two teams in the standings after nine rounds, China and Poland. The Chinese team won narrowly 2½-1½ as Hou Yifan won with the Black pieces against Monika Soćko on the top board and Tan Zhongyi against Klaudia Kulon on the last board; Jolanta Zawadzka scored the only full point for Poland with her victory with the Black pieces against Ju Wenjun in a game in which the Chinese was down an exchange for nebulous compensation, while Zhao Xue successfully defended a rook endgame that was completely winning for Karina Szczepkowska-Horowska. Russia defeated Georgia 2½-1½ thanks to the efforts by Alexandra Kosteniuk and Valentina Gunina on the first two boards who beat Nana Dzagnidze and Lela Javakhishvili, respectively. Alexandra Goryachkina drew against Bela Khotenashvili on the third board in a position with no chances for significant progress on either side. On the lowest board, Nino Batsiashvili and Olga Girya went into a rook and bishop versus rook endgame that the Russian was not able to hold. Alexandra Goryachkina drew against Bela Khotenashvili in a position with no chances for significant progress on either side.

Ukraine and India tied with one win per side. Anna Ushenina was victorious for Ukraine against Soumya Swaminathan on the fourth board; Tania Sachdev beat Natalia Zhukova on the third board, who lost her second game in a row that opened with the Benoni Defence. United States were also held to a draw by Mongolia with Nomin-Erdene Davaademberel beating Irina Krush on the first table as White for Mongolia and Kateřina Němcová beating Uurtsaikh Uuriintuya on board three as Black for the United States. Krush opted for a passive defence in a rook endgame when it was necessary to play more actively and eventually lost the game (see diagram). On the other high tables, Azerbaijan beat Colombia 3–1, while Hungary and Bulgaria scored victories with the lowest margin against France and Germany, respectively.

=== Round 11 ===
The central attention in the final round received the direct clash for the gold medal between China and Russia on the first table. The reigning champions entered the final round with a two-point deficit, meaning that the Chinese needed only a draw to secure the gold. The match started successfully for Russia as Natalija Pogonina beat Guo Qi with the White pieces on the lowest board. The game on the first board between Hou Yifan and Alexandra Kosteniuk was drawn after 65 moves. Nonetheless, the Chinese team bounced back with Valentina Gunina's run of 7 wins in 9 games coming to an end with the loss to Ju Wenjun, while Aleksandra Goryachkina blundered in a difficult position. China won the match 2½-1½ to clinch the title, while Russia finished without a medal in fourth place. On the second table, Poland convincingly beat Hungary 3½-½ with three wins by Jolanta Zawadzka, Klaudia Kulon and Mariola Wozniak on the boards from two to four, while Ukraine scored a 3–1 victory over Bulgaria on the third table thanks to the wins by Anna Muzychuk against Antoaneta Stefanova and Anna Ushenina against Elitsa Raeva. Poland and Ukraine finished with 17 match points each but the Polish team won the tie-breaker for the silver medal, while the Ukrainian team won the bronze medal.

In the other matches on the higher tables, United States and India drew with one game won with the Black pieces by each team. Nazí Paikidze beat Padmini Rout to score a full point for the United States and so did Tania Sachdev against Anna Zatonskih for India. Georgia beat Austria 3–1 with two wins with the White pieces by Lela Javakhishvili and Nino Batsiashvili, while Azerbaijan and Israel defeated Malaysia and Mongolia with the same result, respectively. Vietnam minimally beat the Netherlands 2½-1½ as a result of the wins by Hoàng Thị Bảo Trâm and Nguyễn Thị Thanh An both with the Black pieces.

== Final standings ==
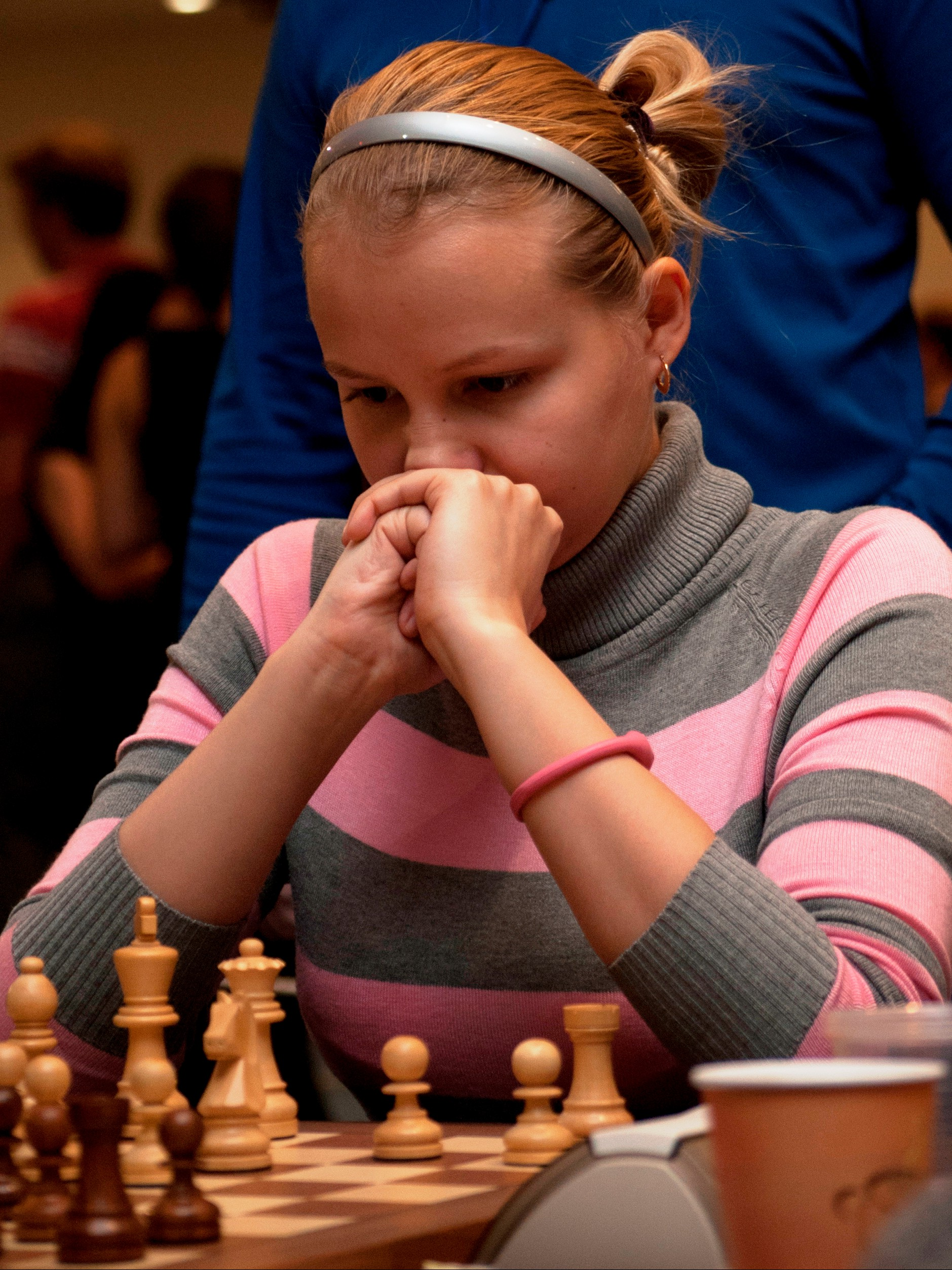
Valentina Gunina of Russia won the individual gold medal in the women's event.

China won their fifth gold medal in the women's event for the first time since 1994 and after three consecutive silver medals. They scored 20 match points with nine wins and two draws, finishing three points ahead of Poland and Ukraine who scored 17 match points each. Poland won the silver medal after winning the tie-breaker with Ukraine. The defending champions from the previous three Olympiads Russia finished without a medal on the fourth place after losing the decisive match for the gold medal against China in the final round. Vietnam, Azerbaijan and Israel have all surprised positively, finishing on the seventh, eighth and the ninth place, respectively. The teams that disappointed with their place in the final standings include Georgia, Bulgaria, Hungary, Romania, Germany, Spain and Turkey.

Valentina Gunina of Russia, playing on board two, won the individual gold medal overall with a score of 8 out of 10 (seven wins, one loss and two draws) and a performance rating of 2643. On the other boards, the gold medals were won by Anna Muzychuk of Ukraine on board one with 7½ out of 10 and a performance rating of 2629, Gulnar Mammadova of Azerbaijan on board three who scored 7 out of 9 with a performance rating of 2559, Tan Zhongyi of China on board four with 9 out of 11 and a performance rating of 2505, and Guo Qi of China as a reserve player who scored 5½ out of 8 with a performance rating of 2394.

=== Team standings ===
#	Country	Players	Average rating	MP	dSB
1	China	Hou, Ju, Zhao, Tan, Guo	2560	20	416.0
2	Poland	Soćko, Zawadzka, Szczepkowska-Horowska, Kulon, Wozniak	2405	17	427.5
3	Ukraine	A. Muzychuk, M. Muzychuk, Zhukova, Ushenina, Gaponenko	2505	17	404.5
4	Russia	Kosteniuk, Gunina, Goryachkina, Pogonina, Girya	2504	16	380.5
5	India	Dronavalli, Rout, Sachdev, Swaminathan, Pratyusha	2433	16	342.5
6	United States	Krush, Paikidze, Zatonskih, Němcová, S. F. Foisor	2406	16	332.5
7	Vietnam	Phạm, Hoàng, Hưng Nguyễn, An Nguyễn	2307	16	328.0
8	Azerbaijan	Mamedyarova, Mammadzada, Mammadova, Hojjatova, Kazimova	2327	16	309.0
9	Israel	Shvayger, Efroimski, Klinova, Gutmakher, Lahav	2309	16	307.5
10	Georgia	Dzagnidze, Javakhishvili, Khotenashvili, Batsiashvili, Melia	2486	15	356.5

Notes

- Average ratings calculated by chess-results.com based in September 2016 ratings.

=== Board standings ===
All board prizes were given out according to performance ratings for players who have played at least eight games at the tournament. Valentina Gunina on the second board had the best performance of all players in the tournament:

- Board 1: (Ukraine) Anna Muzychuk 2629
- Board 2: (Russia) Valentina Gunina 2643
- Board 3: (Azerbaijan) Gulnar Mammadova 2559
- Board 4: (China) Tan Zhongyi 2565
- Reserve: (China) Guo Qi 2394

Board 1

#	Player	Points	Games	Performance rating
1	(Ukraine) Anna Muzychuk	7½	10	2629
2	(China) Hou Yifan	5½	8	2547
3	(Sweden) Pia Cramling	8½	11	2537

Board 2

#	Player	Points	Games	Performance rating
1	(Russia) Valentina Gunina	8	10	2643
2	(China) Ju Wenjun	7½	11	2501
3	(Lithuania) Deimantė Daulytė	8	10	2481

Board 3

#	Player	Points	Games	Performance rating
1	(Azerbaijan) Gulnar Mammadova	7	9	2559
2	(Poland) Karina Szczepkowska-Horowska	6½	8	2547
3	(Vietnam) Nguyễn Thị Mai Hưng	8	11	2442

Board 4

#	Player	Points	Games	Performance rating
1	(China) Tan Zhongyi	9	11	2565
2	(Georgia (country)) Nino Batsiashvili	9	10	2533
3	(Poland) Klaudia Kulon	9	11	2506

Reserve

#	Player	Points	Games	Performance rating
1	(China) Guo Qi	5½	8	2394
2	(France) Andreea-Cristiana Navrotescu	7	10	2285
3	(Hungary) Anita Gara	5	8	2277

== See also ==
- Open event at the 42nd Chess Olympiad

== Bibliography ==
- Agaragimov, Djakhangir (2016). Pearls of Azerbaijan. Baku: Baku Chess Olympiad Operating Committee. ISBN 9788394429089.
