= Narmin Khalafova =

Azerbaijani chess player

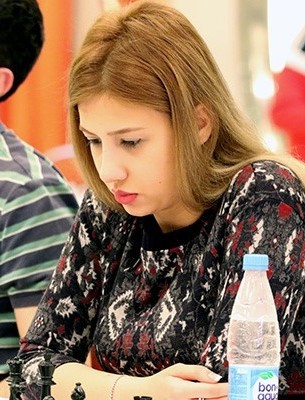
- Khalafova in 2017

Personal information
- Born: 12 January 1994 (age 32) Baku, Azerbaijan

Chess career
- Country: Azerbaijan
- Title: Woman Grandmaster (2017)
- Peak rating: 2303 (April 2017)

Narmin Ilgar qizi Khalafova (Azerbaijani: Nərmin İlqar qızı Xalafova; born 12 January 1994) is an Azerbaijani chess player who holds the title of Woman Grandmaster.

== Career ==
Narmin Khalafova played for Azerbaijan-2 team in the Women's Chess Olympiad:

- In 2016, at third board in the 42nd Chess Olympiad (women) in Baku (+3, =6, -1).
