= Karina Cyfka =

Polish chess player (born 1987)

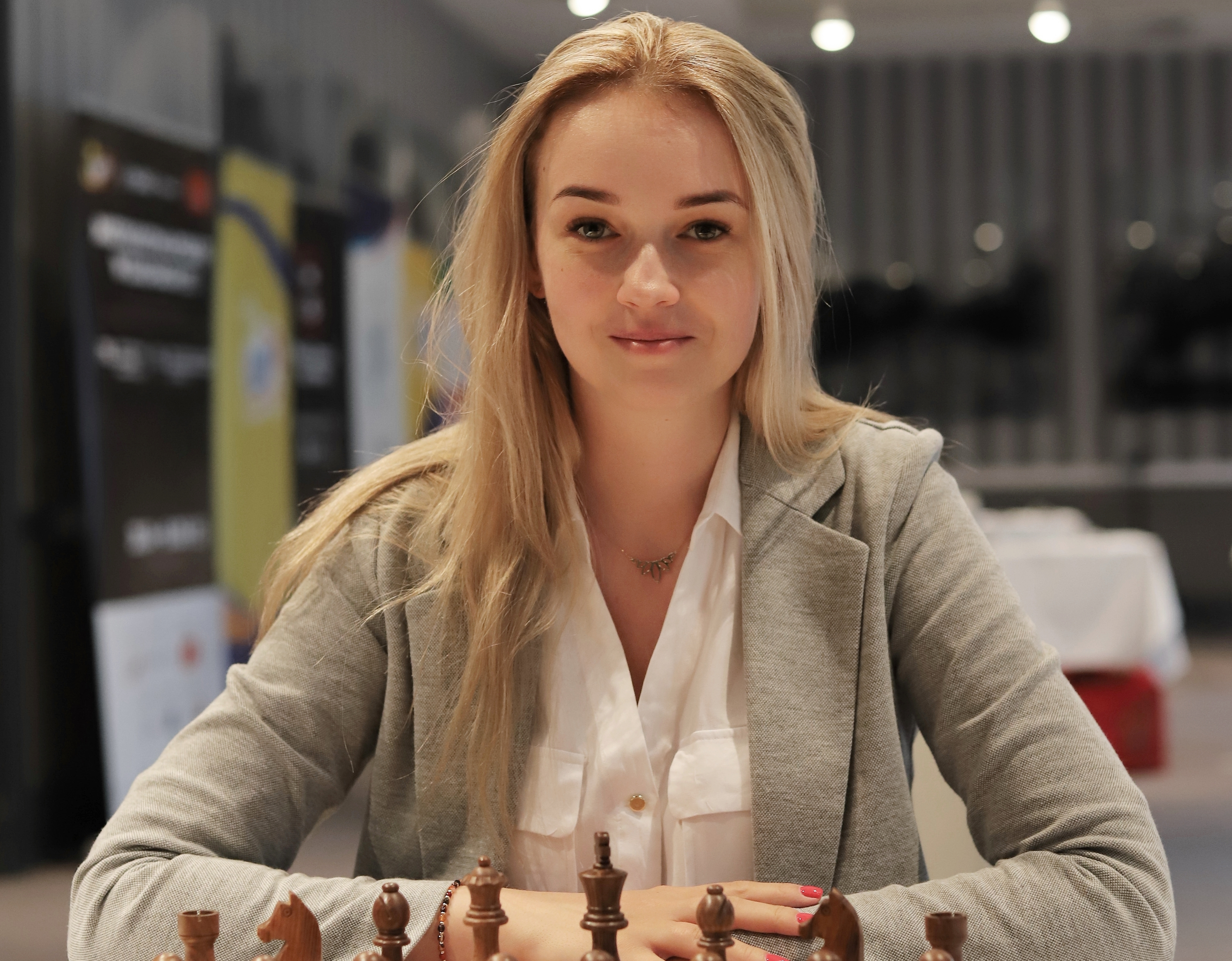
- Cyfka in 2021

Personal information
- Born: 28 October 1987 (age 38) Rybnik, Poland

Chess career
- Country: Poland
- Title: International Master (2016); Woman Grandmaster (2010)
- Peak rating: 2431 (March 2019)

Karina Cyfka (also known as Karina Szczepkowska-Horowska; née Szczepkowska; born 28 October 1987) is a Polish chess player. FIDE awarded her the titles Woman Grandmaster in January 2010 and International Master in September 2016.

In 2003, she tied for first place with Polina Malysheva of Russia at the World Youth Chess Championships in the Girls U16 category and took the silver medal on tiebreak. Cyfka was a multiple times medalist in the Polish junior championships and won the Polish Women's Championship in 2020.

She has played in the Polish national team at the Women's Chess Olympiad, the Women's World Team Chess Championship and the Women's European Team Chess Championship. In 2016, Cyfka won two silver medals in the women's event at the 42nd Chess Olympiad in Baku. In this competition Poland finished second and she also won an individual silver playing board three.
