= Gulnar Mammadova =

Azerbaijani chess player

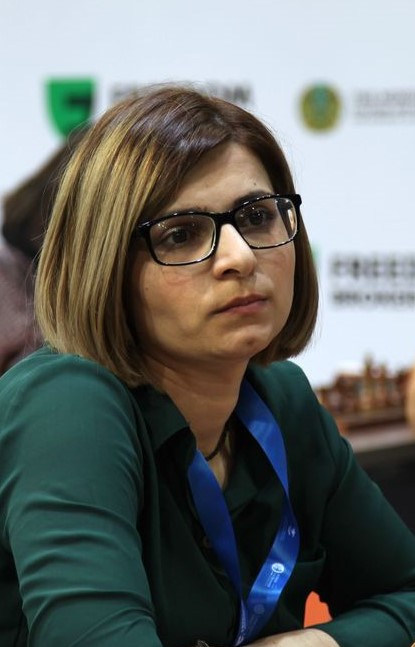
- Mammadova in 2022

Personal information
- Born: Gülnar Mərfət qızı Məmmədova; May 11, 1991 (age 35) Ali-Bayramly, Azerbaijan SSR, Soviet Union

Chess career
- Country: Azerbaijan
- Title: International Master (2017); Woman Grandmaster (2012)
- Peak rating: 2401 (January 2017)

Gulnar Marfat qizi Mammadova (Azerbaijani: Gülnar Mərfət qızı Məmmədova; born May 11, 1991, in Ali-Bayramly) is an Azerbaijani chess player who holds the titles of International master and Woman Grandmaster.

She won the women's section of the Azerbaijani Chess Championship in 2021.

In the 2016 Women's Chess Olympiad, Mammadova won the individual gold medal for the best performance on board 3.
