= Guo Qi =

Chinese chess player (born 1995)

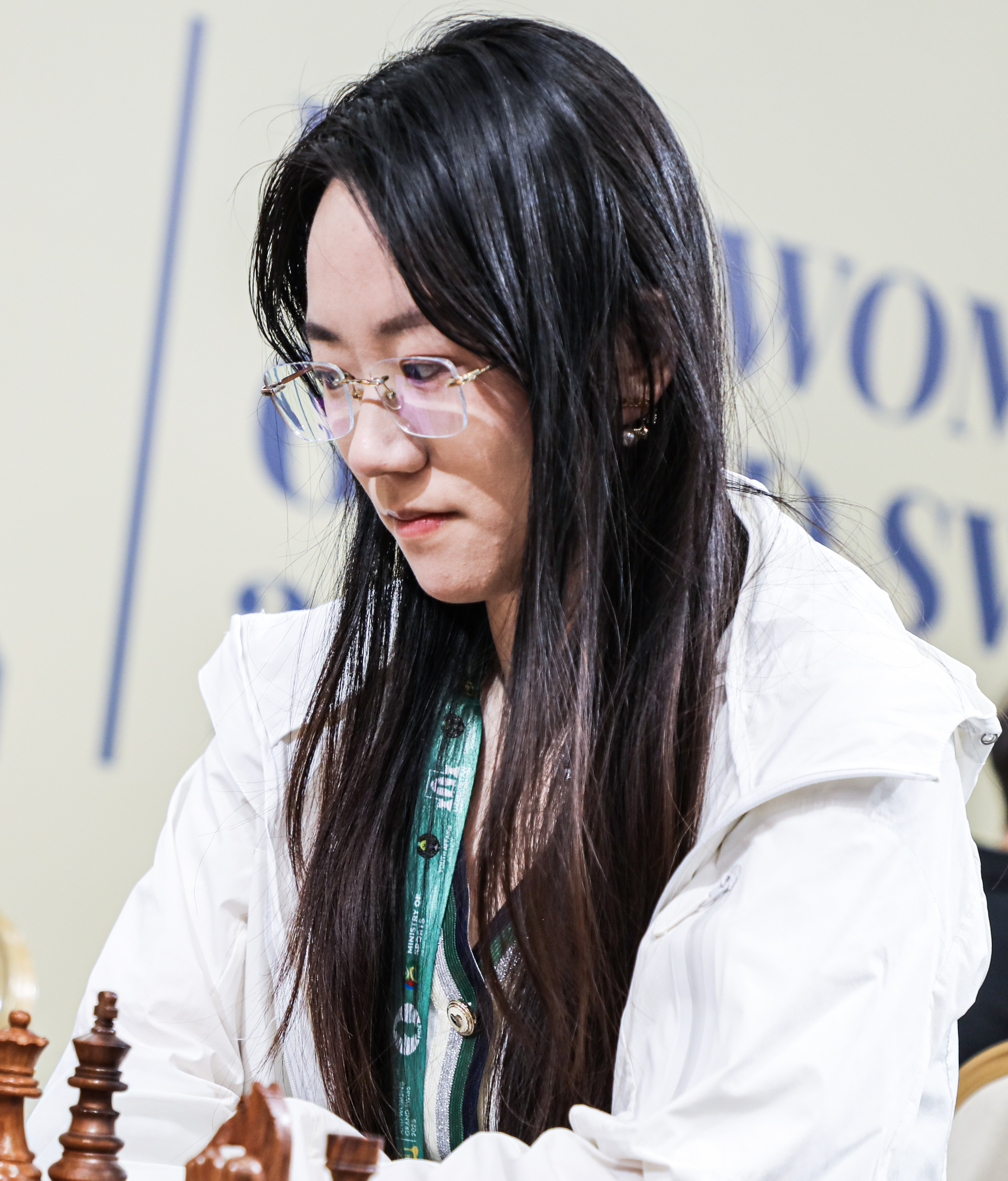
- Guo in 2025

Personal information
- Born: January 27, 1995 (age 31) Xinghua, Jiangsu, China

Chess career
- Country: China
- Title: International Master (2014); Woman Grandmaster (2011)
- Peak rating: 2462 (March 2014)

Guo Qi (Chinese: 郭琦; pinyin: Guō Qí; born January 27, 1995) is a Chinese chess player. She holds the titles of International Master (IM) and Woman Grandmaster (WGM), which FIDE awarded her in 2014 and 2011 respectively.

She won the World Junior Girls Chess Championship in 2012. This achievement earned her the qualification for the Women's World Championship 2014, which was eventually postponed to 2015.

Guo competed in the Women's World Chess Championship 2012 as FIDE president nominee. She was eliminated in the first round by Natalia Zhukova.

Guo was a member of the Chinese team that won the silver medal in the 2013 Women's World Team Chess Championship in Astana, Kazakhstan. In 2014, she won both team and individual (on the reserve board) silver medals in the Women's 2014 Chess Olympiad.

She took part in the Women's World Chess Championship 2015, where she was knocked out in the first round by the eventual runner-up, Natalija Pogonina. In 2016, Guo won the Chinese women's championship. In the same year, she played on the gold medal-winning Chinese team at the Women's Asian Nations Cup in Abu Dhabi and at the Women's Chess Olympiad in Baku. In both events, she also won the gold medal for the best performance on the reserve board.
