= Mariola Woźniak =

Polish chess player

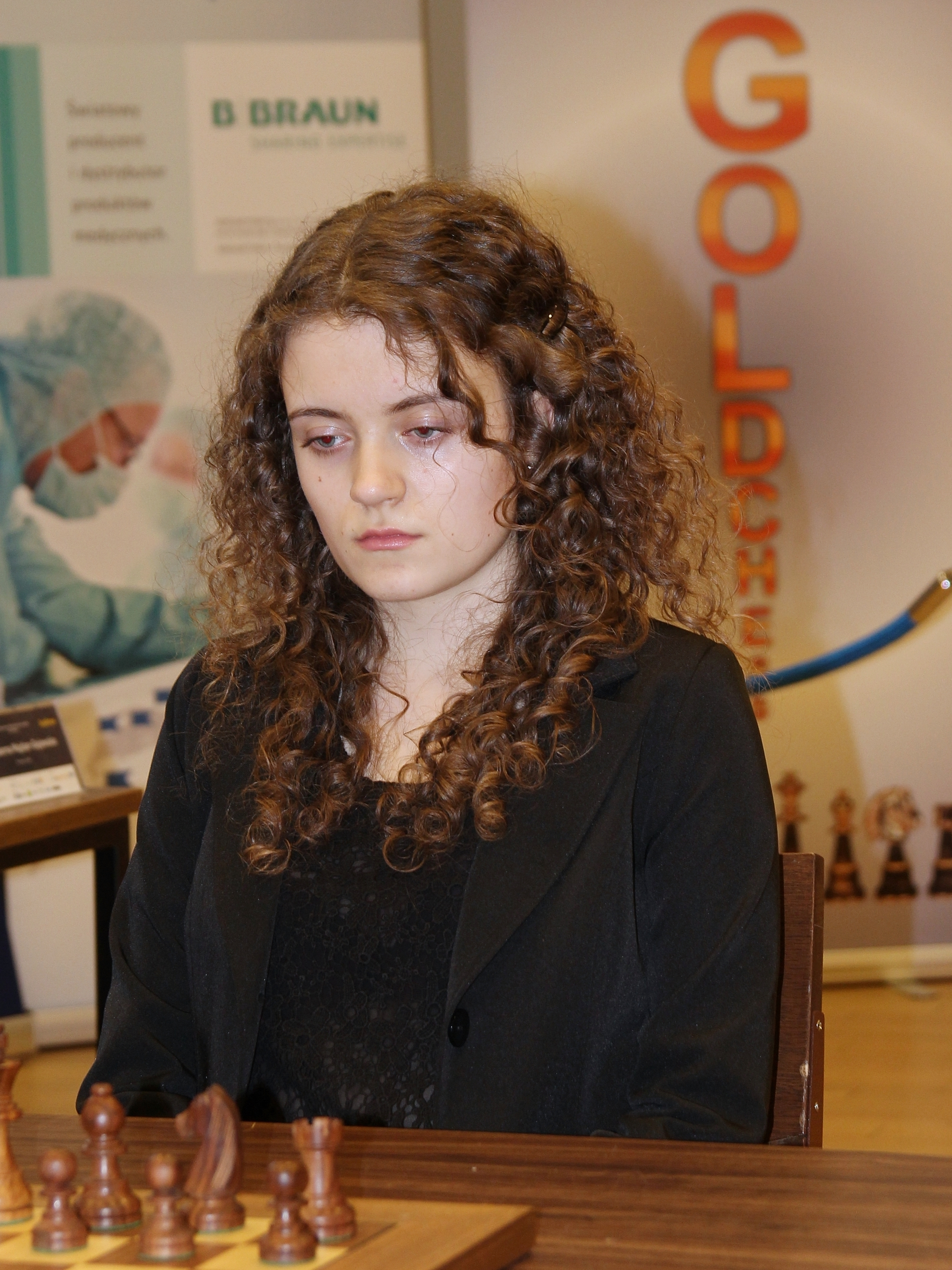
- Woźniak in 2016

Personal information
- Born: 17 March 1998 (age 28)

Chess career
- Country: Poland
- Title: Woman International Master (2015)
- FIDE rating: 2158 (November 2018)
- Peak rating: 2325 (October 2016)

Mariola Wozniak (born 17 March 1998) is a Polish chess player and a woman international master.

She was a runner-up at the European Girls' Chess Championship.

She played as the reserve player for the Polish team which won the silver medal at the Women's event at the 42nd Chess Olympiad, playing in six games.
