= Aydan Hojjatova =

Azerbaijani chess player (born 1999)

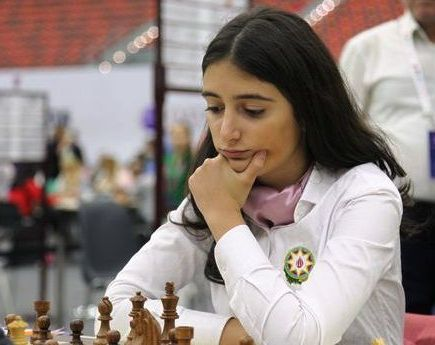
- Hojjatova in 2016

Personal information
- Born: 6 April 1999 (age 27) Baku, Azerbaijan

Chess career
- Country: Azerbaijan
- Title: Woman Grandmaster (2018)
- Peak rating: 2356 (June 2018)

Aydan Hojjatova (Azerbaijani: Aydan Hikmət qızı Höccətova; born 6 April 1999) is an Azerbaijani chess player. She holds the title of Woman International Grandmaster (WIM), which she was awarded in 2018.

== Early life ==
Aydan Höccətova was born in Baku, Azerbaijan. She studied at the Baku branch of the First Moscow State Medical University. Her interest in chess began after watching a chess program on television. She was coached by Grandmaster Farid Abbasov.

== Chess career ==
Aydan started playing chess at the age of two and a half. By the age of three, she earned her fourth-degree chess player norm. At four, she competed in the Baku Championship. At the age of five, she became the first Azerbaijani player to qualify for the National Championship in the 10-and-under category. She is the only Azerbaijani chess player to achieve the first-degree chess player norm at the age of six.

In 2004, she participated in her first international tournament in Moscow, where she was awarded a special diploma and gift by World Champion Anatoly Karpov. In 2005, she shared third and fourth places in the Under-12 World School Chess Championship in Turkey. She also competed in the European Championship in Serbia in 2005, and that year won first place in the "Summer Cup" and second place in the Baku Championship and the 15th Baku Cup.

In 2006, she took part in the World Championship in Batumi, Georgia, and won first place in the Republic Chess Olympiad and the "Autumn Cup" held in Lankaran. She also placed second in the 10-and-under category at the Baku Championship and third in the Republic Championship.

In 2007, Aydan won first place in the Under-8 European Championship in Batumi, Georgia. Later that year, she shared second and third places in the Under-8 World Championship in Antalya, Turkey, with Gunay Mammadzadeh, both scoring 8.5 points. She also won first place in the 10-and-under category at the Baku Championship and the "President's Cup" in memory of Heydar Aliyev. Additionally, she earned second place in the Azerbaijani Championship and third place in the Zagatala Olympiad. On December 24, 2007, she was named "Chess Player of the Year" at a ceremony organized by the Baku City Youth and Sports Department and the New Azerbaijan Party's Youth Union. She was awarded a medal and diploma by the Minister of Youth and Sports, Azad Rahimov.

In 2009, she placed second in the Under-10 European Championship in Fermo, Italy. This year she earned the FIDE titles Woman Candidate Master (WCM).

In November 2013, she won second place at the Turkic-speaking countries' Olympiad held in Eskişehir, Turkey.

In October 2014, she shared second and third places in the Under-16 European Championship in Batumi, Georgia.

In 2015, she earned the title of Woman FIDE Master (WFM), and in 2018 she achieved the title of Woman Grandmaster (WGM).

In September 2016, she made her debut with Azerbaijan's women’s team at the 42nd Chess Olympiad in Baku.

== Ranking ==
As of February 2017, Aydan was ranked 5th among Azerbaijani women chess players with a FIDE rating of 2308. She was ranked 21st in the "Top 100 Girls" and 181st in the "Top 100 Women" FIDE rankings for February 2017.
