= List of FIDE federation player transfers =

This is an incomplete list of chess players who have represented more than one nation in FIDE-sanctioned tournaments. These players underwent a change in national federation affiliation but may not necessarily changed their citizenship in the process but may have to satisfy residency requirements. This excludes players which did not compete in any FIDE-sanctioned event for their previous federation.

== To countries in the Americas ==
Name	Previous federation	New federation	Year	Ref.
Levon Aronian	Armenia	United States	2021	
Albert Becker	Germany	Argentina		
Francisco Benkö	Germany	Argentina		
Erich Eliskases	Germany	Argentina		
Nicolas Engalicev	Latvia/Italy	Canada		
Movsas Feigins	Latvia	Argentina		
Paulino Frydman	Poland	Argentina		
Sonja Graf	Germany	Argentina; United States		
Aristide Gromer	France	Argentina		
Zelman Kleinstein	Palestine	Argentina		
Markas Luckis	Lithuania	Argentina		
Paul Michel	Germany	Argentina		
Miguel Najdorf	Poland	Argentina		
Jiri Pelikan	Czechoslovakia	Argentina		
Hermann Pilnik	Germany	Argentina		
Meir Rauch	Palestine; Poland	Argentina; Israel		
Ilmar Raud	Estonia	Argentina		
Heinrich Reinhardt	Germany	Argentina		
Chris de Ronde	Netherlands	Argentina		
Paulette Schwartzmann	France	Argentina		
Adolf Seitz	Germany	Argentina; Switzerland		
Karel Skalička	Czechoslovakia	Argentina		
Maxim Sorokin	Russia	Argentina		
Gideon Ståhlberg	Sweden	Argentina; Sweden		
Franciszek Sulik	Poland	Argentina; Australia		
Victor Winz	Germany; Palestine	Argentina		
Paul Baender	Germany	Bolivia		
Ludwig Engels	Germany	Brazil		
Jacob Ascher	England	Canada		
Evgeny Bareev	Russia	Canada		
Fedir Bohatyrchuk	Soviet Union	Canada		
Géza Füster	Hungary	Canada		
Leonid Gerzhoy	Israel	Canada		
Igor Vasilyevich Ivanov	Soviet Union	Canada; United States		
Carlos Jauregui	Chile	Canada		
Miervaldis Jurševskis	Latvia	Canada		
Natalia Khoudgarian	Russia	Canada		
Anton Kovalyov	Argentina	Canada		
Stanislav Kriventsov	Russia; United States	Canada		
Roman Pelts	Soviet Union	Canada		
William H. K. Pollock	England/Ireland	Canada		
Edward Porper	Israel; Soviet Union	Canada		
Alexander Rabinovich	Israel	Canada		
Bator Sambuev	Russia	Canada		
Artiom Samsonkin	Belarus	Canada		
Zoltan Sarosy	Hungary	Canada		
Stephen Francis Smith	United Kingdom	Canada		
Yan Teplitsky	Israel; Russia	Canada		
Dimitri Tyomkin	Israel	Canada		
Povilas Vaitonis	Lithuania	Canada		
Zvonko Vranesic	Yugoslavia	Canada		
Yang Kaiqi	China	Canada		
Qiyu Zhou	Finland	Canada		
Alexis Cabrera	Cuba	Colombia; Spain		
Neuris Delgado Ramírez	Cuba	Colombia; Paraguay		
Daniel Tapia	United States	Colombia		
Gerardo Budowski	Germany; Venezuela	Costa Rica		
Francisco Perez	Spain	Cuba		
Nelson Pinal Borges	Cuba	Dominican Republic		
Lisandro Fernandez Reyes	Cuba	Ecuador		
Paul Klein	Germany	Ecuador		
Bruno Moritz	Germany	Ecuador		
Lemnys Arias	Honduras	El Salvador	2001	
Alvaro Blanco Fernandez	Cuba	Mexico		
Juan Carlos González Zamora	Cuba	Mexico		
Neuris Delgado Ramírez	Colombia; Cuba	Paraguay		
Tatev Abrahamyan	Armenia	United States		
Anna Akhsharumova	Soviet Union	United States		
Varuzhan Akobian	Armenia	United States		
Lev Alburt	Soviet Union	United States		
Babakuli Annakov	Turkmenistan	United States		
Camilla Baginskaite	Lithuania	United States		
Batchimeg Tuvshintugs	Mongolia	United States		
Mikhail Baturyn	Belarus	United States		
Julio Becerra Rivero	Cuba	United States		
Anjelina Belakovskaia	Ukraine	United States		
Pal Benko	Hungary	United States		
Horace Bigelow	England	United States		
Boris Blumin	Canada	United States		
Walter Browne	Australia	United States		
Lázaro Bruzón	Cuba	United States		
Oscar Chajes	Austria-Hungary	United States		
Akshat Chandra	India	United States		
Fidel Corrales Jimenez	Cuba	United States		
Dorsa Derakhshani	Iran	United States		
Leinier Domínguez	Cuba	United States		
Elena Donaldson-Akhmilovskaya	Soviet Union	United States		
Leonids Dreibergs	Latvia	United States		
Roman Dzindzichashvili	Israel; Soviet Union	United States		
Louis Eisenberg	Ukraine	United States		
Arpad Elo	Hungary	United States		
Jaan Ehlvest	Estonia	United States		
Esther Epstein	Soviet Union	United States		
Sergey Erenburg	Israel; Soviet Union	United States		
Samuel Factor	Poland	United States		
Ali Farahat	Egypt	United States		
Florin Felecan	Romania	United States		
Andrei-Costel Florean	Romania	United States		
Sabina-Francesca Foisor	Romania	United States		
Selim Franklin	England	United States		
Timur Gareyev	Uzbekistan	United States		
Samuel Gold	Austria-Hungary	United States		
Alexander Goldin	Israel; Soviet Union	United States		
Rusudan Goletiani	Georgia	United States	2001	
Renier Gonzalez	Cuba	United States		
Sonja Graf	Argentina; Germany	United States		
Eduard Gufeld	Georgia	United States		
Boris Gulko	Soviet Union	United States		
Dmitry Gurevich	Soviet Union	United States		
Anna Hahn	Latvia	United States		
Holden Hernandez Carmenate	Cuba	United States		
Ildar Ibragimov	Russia	United States		
Alexander Ivanov	Soviet Union	United States		
Igor Vasilyevich Ivanov	Canada; Soviet Union	United States		
Zviad Izoria	Georgia	United States		
Gregory Kaidanov	Russia	United States		
Gata Kamsky	Soviet Union	United States		
Albert Kapengut	Belarus	United States		
Mona May Karff	Palestine	United States		
Lubomir Kavalek	Czechoslovakia	United States		
Hans Kmoch	Austria	United States		
Boris Kogan	Soviet Union	United States		
George Koltanowski	Belgium	United States		
Boris Kreiman	Soviet Union	United States		
Stanislav Kriventsov	Russia	Canada; United States		
Edward Lasker	Germany	United States		
Emanuel Lasker	Germany; Soviet Union	United States		
Anatoly Lein	Soviet Union	United States		
Irina Levitina	Soviet Union	United States		
Theodor Lichtenhein	Germany	United States		
Marlo Micayabas	Philippines	United States		
Nikolay Minev	Bulgaria	United States		
Elshan Moradi	Iran	United States		
Alejandro Moreno	Cuba	United States		
Kateřina Němcová	Czech Republic	United States		
Viktorija Ni	Latvia	United States		
Alexander Onischuk	Ukraine	United States		
Georgi Orlov	Russia	United States		
Nazí Paikidze	Georgia	United States		
Sam Palatnik	Soviet Union	United States		
Rudolf Pitschak	Czechoslovakia	United States		
Joseph Platz	Germany	United States		
Susan Polgar	Hungary	United States		
Stepan Popel	Ukraine/Poland; France	United States		
Yuniesky Quesada Perez	Cuba	United States		
Alejandro Ramirez	Costa Rica	United States		
Samuel Reshevsky	Poland	United States		
Katerina Rohonyan	Ukraine	United States		
Jacob Rosenthal	Poland; Netherlands	United States		
Nicolas Rossolimo	France	United States		
John William Schulten	Germany	United States		
Gabriel Schwartzman	Romania	United States		
Gregory Serper	Uzbekistan	United States		
Alexander Shabalov	Latvia	United States		
Leonid Shamkovich	Soviet Union; Israel	United States		
Anna Sharevich	Belarus	United States		
Miron Sher	Russia	United States		
Kamran Shirazi	Iran	United States; France		
Yury Shulman	Belarus	United States		
Mikhail Shur	Azerbaijan	United States		
Wesley So	Philippines	United States	2014	
Wilhelm Steinitz	Austrian Empire; United Kingdom	United States		
Alexander Stripunsky	Ukraine	United States		
Dariusz Świercz	Poland	United States		
Povilas Tautvaišas	Lithuania	United States		
Oscar Tenner	Germany	United States		
Gulrukhbegim Tokhirjonova	Uzbekistan	United States		
Myroslav Turiansky	Soviet Union; Austria	United States		
Milan Vukcevich	Yugoslavia	United States		
Aleksander Wojtkiewicz	Soviet Union; Poland	United States		
Alex Yermolinsky	Soviet Union	United States		
Anna Zatonskih	Ukraine	United States		
Elmārs Zemgalis	Latvia	United States		
Yaroslav Zherebukh	Ukraine	United States		
Raset Ziatdinov	Uzbekistan	United States		
Luis Ernesto Rodi	Argentina	Uruguay		
Jaime Bograd	Romania	Venezuela		
Gerardo Budowski	Germany	Venezuela; Costa Rica		
Ariel Marichal Gonzalez	Cuba	Venezuela		
Antonio Medina	Spain	Venezuela		
Wilson Palencia	Colombia	Venezuela		
László Tapasztó	Hungary	Venezuela		
Félix Ynojosa	England	Venezuela		

== To countries in Asia ==
Name	Previous federation	New federation	Year	Ref.
Igors Rausis	Latvia	Bangladesh; Czech Republic		
Paul Truong	United States	Cambodia		
Izak Aloni	Poland	Palestine/Israel		
Boris Alterman	Soviet Union	Israel		
Boris Avrukh	Kazakhstan	Israel		
Dina Belenkaya	Russia	Israel	2022	
Alexander Bagrationi	Ukraine	Israel		
Valeri Beim	Soviet Union	Israel; Austria		
Abram Blass	Poland	Palestine/Israel		
Angela Borsuk	Ukraine	Israel		
Omar Cartagena	United States	Philippines	2001	
Moshe Czerniak	Poland	Palestine/Israel		
Ronald Cusi	United States	Philippines	2000	
Boruch Israel Dyner	Belgium	Israel		
Roman Dzindzichashvili	Soviet Union	Israel; United States		
David Enoch	Germany	Palestine/Israel		
Sergey Erenburg	Russia	Israel; United States		
Elenara Eynullaeva	United States	Azerbaijan	2001	
Roza Eynullaeva	United States	Azerbaijan	2001	
Boris Gelfand	Belarus	Israel		
Leonid Gofshtein	Soviet Union	Israel		
Alexander Goldin	Russia	Israel; United States		
Rusudan Goletiani	United States	Georgia		
Vitali Golod	Ukraine	Israel		
Izaak Grynfeld	Poland	Israel		
Andrei Gurbanov	Belarus	Israel		
Lev Gutman	Soviet Union	Israel; Germany		
Alexander Huzman	Ukraine	Israel		
Bella Igla	Russia	Israel		
Boris Kantsler	Kyrgyzstan	Israel		
Michael Klenburg	Ukraine	Israel		
Tamara Klink	Germany	Kazakhstan		
Alla Kushnir	Soviet Union	Israel		
Vladimir Liberzon	Soviet Union	Israel		
Aleksandras Machtas	Lithuania	Palestine/Israel		
Houshang Mashian	Iran	Israel		
Victor Mikhalevski	Soviet Union	Israel		
Vadim Milov	Russia	Israel; Switzerland		
Evgeny Miller	Canada	Israel	2001	
Ariah Mohiliver	Poland	Palestine/Israel		
Jacob Murey	Soviet Union	Israel		
Menachem Oren	Poland	Palestine/Israel		
Raaphi Persitz	United Kingdom	Israel; Switzerland		
Yosef Porath	Germany	Palestine/Israel		
Edward Porper	Soviet Union	Israel; Canada		
Lev Psakhis	Soviet Union	Israel		
Meir Rauch	Poland	Palestine/Israel		
Salome Reischer	Austria	Palestine		
Eva Repkova	Slovakia	Lebanon	2001	
Tagir Sadriev	Russia	Uzbekistan	2001	
Leonid Shamkovich	Russia	Israel; United States		
Yuliya Shvayger	Ukraine	Israel		
Ilya Smirin	Soviet Union	Israel		
Lazare Suchowolski	Poland; Australia	Israel		
Emil Sutovsky	Soviet Union	Israel		
Gedali Szapiro	Poland	Israel		
Yan Teplitsky	Russia	Israel; Canada		
Mark Tseitlin	Soviet Union	Israel		
Isakas Vistaneckis	Lithuania	Israel		
Victor Winz	Germany	Palestine/Israel; Argentina		
Leonid Yudasin	Russia	Israel		
Tatiana Zatulovskaya	Russia	Israel		
Yaacov Zilberman	Soviet Union	Israel		
Domingo Ramos	Philippines	Japan		
Yevgeniy Pak	Uzbekistan	Kazakhstan		
Vladislav Tkachiev	Russia	Kazakhstan; France		
Eva Repkova	Slovakia	Lebanon		
Evgenij Ermenkov	Bulgaria	Palestine		
Christian Michel Yunis	Chile	Palestine		
Zhu Chen	China	Qatar		
Zhe Quan	United States	China	2001	
Gong Qianyun	China	Singapore		
Li Ruofan	China	Singapore		
Enrique Paciencia	Philippines	Singapore		
Olimpiu G. Urcan	Romania	Singapore		
Buenaventura Villamayor	Philippines	Singapore		
Wu Shaobin	China	Singapore		
Zhang Zhong	China	Singapore		
Jose Camacho Collados	Spain	South Korea		
Alexey Kim	Russia	South Korea		
Gamil Agamaliev	Azerbaijan	Turkey		
Ekaterina Atalik	Russia	Turkey		
Cemil Gulbas	Belgium	Turkey		
Mikhail Gurevich	Soviet Union; Belgium	Turkey		
Alexander Ipatov	Ukraine; Spain	Turkey		
Ergin Mollaoglu	Bulgaria	Turkey		
Dragan Šolak	Serbia	Turkey		
Trần Thanh Tú	Vietnam	Japan		

== To countries in Europe ==
Name	Previous federation	New federation	Year	Ref.
Vangjel Buli	Italy	Albania		
Robert Aloma Vidal	Spain	Andorra		
Oscar de la Riva Aguado	Spain	Andorra		
Juan Mellado Triviño	Spain	Andorra		
David Norwood	England	Andorra		
Josep Oms Pallise	Spain	Andorra		
Maria Kursova	Russia	Armenia		
Sergei Movsesian	Georgia; Czech Republic; Slovakia	Armenia		
Arsen Yegiazarian	Russia	Armenia		
Valery Atlas	Soviet Union; Liechtenstein	Austria		
Valeri Beim	Soviet Union; Israel	Austria		
Ivo Donev	Bulgaria	Austria		
Alexander Halprin	Russia	Austria		
Tunç Hamarat	Turkey	Austria		
Stefan Kindermann	Germany	Austria		
Julius Perlis	Poland	Austria		
Davit Shengelia	Georgia	Austria		
Regina Theissl Pokorna	Slovakia	Austria		
Gadir Guseinov	Russia	Azerbaijan		
Zaur Mammadov	Russia	Azerbaijan		
Arkadij Naiditsch	Latvia; Germany	Azerbaijan		
Stefan Beukema	Netherlands	Belgium		
Vladimir Chuchelov	Russia	Belgium		
Alexander Dgebuadze	Georgia	Belgium		
Andrija Fuderer	Yugoslavia	Belgium		
Mikhail Gurevich	Soviet Union	Belgium; Turkey		
Mher Hovhannisyan	Armenia	Belgium		
Vadim Malakhatko	Ukraine	Belgium		
Ulvi Sadikhov	Azerbaijan	Belgium		
Victor Soultanbeieff	Ukraine	Belgium		
Anna Zozulia	Ukraine	Belgium		
Inna Dubinka	Ukraine	Belarus	2001	
Suat Atalık	Turkey	Bosnia and Herzegovina; Serbia		
Ivan Galić	Croatia	Bosnia and Herzegovina		
Borki Predojević	Serbia and Montenegro	Bosnia and Herzegovina		
Dalibor Stojanović	Serbia and Montenegro	Bosnia and Herzegovina		
Tatjana Lematschko	Soviet Union	Bulgaria; Switzerland		
Ilja Lebović-Nader	Azerbaijan; Russia	Croatia		
Emir Dizdarević	Bosnia and Herzegovina	Croatia		
Valentina Golubenko	Estonia	Croatia		
Esad Gorić	Bosnia and Herzegovina	Croatia		
Fazil Havej	Azerbaijan	Croatia		
Zdenko Kožul	Bosnia and Herzegovina	Croatia		
Bojan Kurajica	Bosnia and Herzegovina	Croatia		
Mario Lazzaratti	Italy	Croatia		
Danijel Lumelović	Bosnia and Herzegovina	Croatia		
Iván Morovic	Chile	Croatia		
Drazen Muše	Germany	Croatia		
Mladen Muše	Germany	Croatia		
Dragan Novaković	Serbia and Montenegro	Croatia		
Miroslav Pucovski	Serbia	Croatia		
Dražen Sermek	Slovenia	Croatia		
Domagoj Vlašić	Ukraine	Croatia		
Vasilios Kotronias	Greece	Cyprus		
Thomas Hinks-Edwards	England	Czech Republic		
Alexey Kislinsky	Ukraine	Czech Republic		
Epaminondas Kourousis	Greece	Czech Republic		
Peter Michalik	Slovakia	Czech Republic		
Sergei Movsesian	Georgia	Czech Republic; Slovakia; Armenia		
Vitezslav Priehoda	Slovakia	Czech Republic		
Igors Rausis	Latvia; Bangladesh	Czech Republic		
Oleg Spirin	Russia	Czech Republic		
Joanna Worek	Poland	Czech Republic		
Kassa Korley	United States	Denmark		
Aron Nimzowitsch	Russian Empire	Denmark		
Jana Bellin	Czechoslovakia	England		
Murray Chandler	New Zealand	England		
Dagnė Čiukšytė	Lithuania	England		
Anya Corke	Hong Kong	England		
Daniel Howard Fernandez	Singapore	England		
David Friedgood	South Africa	England		
Bogdan Lalić	Croatia	England		
Sue Maroroa	New Zealand	England		
Michael Rahal	Spain	England		
Mihai Șubă	Romania	England		
Robert Wade	New Zealand	England		
Alexander Alekhine	Soviet Union	France		
Silvia Aleksieva	Bulgaria	France		
Amir Bagheri	Iran	France		
Abraham Baratz	Romania	France		
Ossip Bernstein	Russian Empire	France		
Josef Cukierman	Poland	France		
Josif Dorfman	Soviet Union	France		
Alireza Firouzja	Iran	France	2021	
Tigran Gharamian	Armenia	France		
François Godart	Belgium	France		
Hichem Hamdouchi	Morocco	France		
Borya Ider	Mongolia	France		
Andrei Istrățescu	Romania	France		
Victor Kahn	Russia	France		
Lionel Kieseritzky	Livonia	France		
Anthony Kosten	England	France		
Bachar Kouatly	Lebanon	France		
Vladimir Lazarev	Russia	France		
Nikolay Legky	Ukraine	France		
Nino Maisuradze	Georgia	France		
Léon Monosson	Soviet Union	France		
Catalin Navrotescu	Romania	France		
Vladimir Okhotnik	Ukraine	France		
Stepan Popel	Poland/Ukraine	France; United States		
Anda Šafranska	Latvia	France		
Andrei Shchekachev	Russia	France		
Kamran Shirazi	Iran; United States	France		
Almira Skripchenko	Moldova	France		
Andrei Sokolov	Russia	France		
Boris Spassky	Soviet Union	France		
Savielly Tartakower	Poland	France		
Vladislav Tkachiev	Russia; Kazakhstan	France		
Miodrag Todorcevic	Yugoslavia; Serbia and Montenegro	France; Spain		
Anatoly Vaisser	Soviet Union	France		
Ivan Cheparinov	Bulgaria	Georgia		
Levon Aronian	Armenia	Germany		
Albert Becker	Austria	Germany; Argentina		
Alexander Belezky	Ukraine	Germany		
Aleksandar Berelovich	Ukraine	Germany		
Igor Berezovsky	Russia	Germany; Monaco		
Efim Bogoljubov	Soviet Union	Germany		
Rustem Dautov	Russia	Germany		
Michael Fedorovsky	Ukraine	Germany		
Michael Feygin	Ukraine	Germany		
Daniel Fridman	Latvia	Germany		
Rafael Fridman	Latvia	Germany		
Karl Gilg	Czechoslovakia	Germany		
Igor Glek	Russia	Germany		
Alexander Graf	Uzbekistan	Germany		
Bernhard Gregory	Russian Empire	Germany		
Lev Gutman	Soviet Union; Israel	Germany		
Baldur Hönlinger	Austria	Germany		
Vlastimil Hort	Czechoslovakia	Germany		
Otto Junge	Chile	Germany		
Ketino Kachiani	Georgia	Germany		
Igor Khenkin	Russia	Germany		
Jerzy Konikowski	Poland	Germany		
Leonid Kritz	Russia	Germany		
Jonas Lampert	Switzerland	Germany		
Elena Levushkina	Uzbekistan	Germany		
Paul List	Russian Empire	Germany; United Kingdom		
Jakov Loxine	Russia	Germany		
Jakob Meister	Russia	Germany		
Marta Michna	Poland	Germany		
Leonid Milov	Ukraine	Germany		
Paul Mross	Poland	Germany		
Illya Mutschnik	Ukraine	Germany		
Arkadij Naiditsch	Latvia	Germany; Azerbaijan		
Liviu-Dieter Nisipeanu	Romania	Germany		
Luděk Pachman	Czechoslovakia	Germany		
Sergej Salov	Russia	Germany		
Sergiu Samarian	Romania	Germany		
Massoud Amir Sawadkuhi	Iran	Germany		
Paul Felix Schmidt	Estonia	Germany		
Nikolai Shalnev	Ukraine	Germany		
Igor Solomunović	Bosnia and Herzegovina	Germany; Serbia		
Eugen Tripolsky	Ukraine	Germany		
Leon Tuhan-Baranowski	Poland	Germany		
Roman Vidonyak	Ukraine	Germany		
Artur Yusupov	Russia	Germany		
Johannes Zukertort	Poland	Germany; United Kingdom		
Yelena Dembo	Israel; Hungary	Greece		
Atanas Dimitrov	Bulgaria	Greece		
Andreas Kelires	Cyprus	Greece		
Igor Miladinović	(Serbia and Montenegro) FR Yugoslavia	Greece		
Cao Sang	Vietnam	Hungary		
Alexander Chernin	Soviet Union	Hungary		
Yelena Dembo	Israel	Hungary; Greece		
Hoang Thanh Trang	Vietnam	Hungary		
Oliver Mihok	Germany	Hungary		
Szidonia Vajda	Romania	Hungary		
Henrik Danielsen	Denmark	Iceland		
Lenka Ptáčníková	Czech Republic	Iceland		
Alexander Baburin	Russia	Ireland		
Wolfgang Heidenfeld	South Africa	Ireland		
Brian Reilly	France; United Kingdom	Ireland		
Esteban Canal	Peru	Italy		
Fabiano Caruana	United States	Italy		
Alberto David	Luxembourg	Italy		
Igor Efimov	Georgia	Italy; Monaco		
Carlos Garcia Palermo	Argentina	Italy		
Lexy Ortega	Cuba	Italy		
Francesco Rambaldi	France	Italy		
Elena Sedina	Ukraine	Italy		
Eugenio Szabados	Hungary	Italy		
Stefano Tatai	Hungary	Italy		
Bela Toth	Hungary	Italy		
Olga Zimina	Russia	Italy		
Alexander Zlochevskij	Russia	Italy		
Lūcijs Endzelīns	Estonia	Latvia; Australia		
Igor Kovalenko	Ukraine	Latvia		
Evgeny Sveshnikov	Russia	Latvia		
Valery Atlas	Soviet Union	Liechtenstein; Austria		
Vladas Mikėnas	Estonia	Lithuania		
Elvira Berend	Kazakhstan	Luxembourg		
Michael Wiedenkeller	Sweden	Luxembourg		
Kiril Georgiev	Bulgaria	North Macedonia		
Vladimir Georgiev	Bulgaria	North Macedonia		
Torben Sorensen	Denmark	Malta		
Igor Berezovsky	Russia; Germany	Monaco		
Algimantas Butnorius	Lithuania	Monaco		
Igor Efimov	Georgia; Italy	Monaco		
Robert Fontaine	France	Monaco; Switzerland		
Damir Levacic	France	Monaco		
David Marciano	France	Monaco		
Nenad Sulava	Croatia	Monaco		
Tea Lanchava	Georgia	Netherlands		
Iwona Bos-Swiecik	Poland	Netherlands		
Roberto Cifuentes	Chile	Netherlands; Spain		
Anish Giri	Russia	Netherlands		
Sopiko Guramishvili	Georgia	Netherlands		
Käty van der Mije-Nicolau	Romania	Netherlands		
Iozefina Păuleţ	Romania	Netherlands		
Peng Zhaoqin	China	Netherlands		
Ivan Sokolov	Bosnia and Herzegovina	Netherlands		
Gennadi Sosonko	Soviet Union	Netherlands		
Erika Sziva	Hungary	Netherlands		
Hiong Liong Tan	Indonesia	Netherlands		
Sergei Tiviakov	Russia	Netherlands		
Maxim Devereaux	England	Norway		
Bjarke Sahl	Denmark	Norway		
Jonathan Tisdall	United States	Norway		
Alina Kashlinskaya	Russia	Poland		
Michał Krasenkow	Russia	Poland		
Aleksandra Maltsevskaya	Russia	Poland		
Aleksander Wojtkiewicz	Soviet Union	Poland; United States		
Jurij Zezulkin	Belarus	Poland		
Irina Bulmaga	Moldova	Romania		
Tim Walast	England	Romania		
Bibisara Assaubayeva	Kazakhstan	Russia		
Roman Babici	Moldova	Russia		
Alisa Galliamova	Ukraine	Russia		
Ernesto Inarkiev	Kyrgyzstan	Russia	2000	
Sergey Karjakin	Ukraine	Russia		
Kateryna Lagno	Ukraine	Russia		
Svetlana Matveeva	Kyrgyzstan	Russia		
Maxim Pavlov	Ukraine	Russia		
Leonid Raikin	Ukraine	Russia		
Elena Tairova	Belarus	Russia		
Tatjana Vasilevich	Ukraine	Russia		
Valeriy Yoshan	Ukraine	Russia		
Kira Zvorykina	Belarus	Russia		
Jacob Aagaard	Denmark	Scotland		
Ketevan Arakhamia-Grant	Georgia	Scotland		
Andrew Greet	England	Scotland		
Matthew Turner	England	Scotland		
Suat Atalık	Turkey; Bosnia and Herzegovina	Serbia		
Dejan Pavlović	Montenegro	Serbia		
Igor Solomunović	Bosnia and Herzegovina; Germany	Serbia		
Ranko Szuhanek	Romania	Serbia		
Jovana Vojinović	Montenegro	Serbia		
Sergei Movsesian	Georgia; Czech Republic	Slovakia; Armenia		
Indira Babataeva	Kazakhstan	Slovenia		
Alexander Beliavsky	Ukraine	Slovenia		
Zvonimir Meštrović	Bosnia and Herzegovina	Slovenia		
Adrian Mikhalchishin	Ukraine	Slovenia		
Anna Muzychuk	Ukraine	Slovenia		
Salo Flohr	Czechoslovakia	Soviet Union		
Emanuel Lasker	Germany	Soviet Union; United States		
Andor Lilienthal	Hungary	Soviet Union		
Olga Alexandrova	Ukraine	Spain		
Alexis Cabrera	Cuba; Colombia	Spain		
Renier Castellanos Rodriguez	Chile	Spain		
Roberto Cifuentes	Chile; Netherlands	Spain		
Diego Del Rey	Argentina	Spain		
Javier Gil Capape	Australia	Spain		
José Angel Guerra Méndez	Cuba	Spain		
Irisberto Herrera	Cuba	Spain		
Eduardo Iturrizaga	Venezuela	Spain		
Alexander Ipatov	Ukraine	Spain; Turkey		
Ibragim Khamrakulov	Uzbekistan	Spain		
Oleg Korneev	Russia	Spain		
Ana Matnadze	Georgia	Spain		
Viktor Moskalenko	Ukraine	Spain		
Miguel Muñoz Pantoja	Peru	Spain		
Orelvis Perez Mitjans	Cuba	Spain		
Daniel Rodriguez Pineda	Cuba	Spain		
Horacio Saldano Dayer	Argentina	Spain		
Alexei Shirov	Latvia	Spain		
Mihai Șubă	Romania	Spain		
Miodrag Todorcevic	Yugoslavia; France; Serbia and Montenegro	Spain		
Elizbar Ubilava	Georgia	Spain		
Renier Vazquez Igarza	Cuba	Spain		
Arturo Vidarte Morales	Peru	Spain		
Evgeny Agrest	Russia	Sweden		
Juan Manuel Bellón López	Spain	Sweden		
Leho Laurine	Estonia	Sweden		
Jerzy Lewi	Poland	Sweden		
Sebastian Bogner	Germany	Switzerland		
Branko Filipović	Croatia	Switzerland		
Robert Fontaine	France; Monaco	Switzerland		
Joseph Gallagher	England	Switzerland		
Viktor Gavrikov	Lithuania	Switzerland		
Ernő Gereben	Hungary	Switzerland		
Barbara Hund	Germany	Switzerland		
Nedeljko Kelecevic	Bosnia and Herzegovina	Switzerland		
Viktor Korchnoi	Soviet Union	Switzerland		
Tatjana Lematschko	Soviet Union; Bulgaria	Switzerland		
Vadim Milov	Russia; Israel	Switzerland		
Ivan Nemet	Yugoslavia	Switzerland		
Raaphi Persitz	England; Israel	Switzerland		
Artur Popławski	Poland	Switzerland		
Peter Petrovich Saburov	Russia	Switzerland		
Adolf Seitz	Germany; Argentina	Switzerland		
Aleksandr Vladimirovich Kalinin	Belarus	Ukraine		
Vladimir Makarov	Moldova	Ukraine		
Sergey Smolin	Russia	Ukraine		
István Fazekas	Czechoslovakia	United Kingdom		
Isidor Gunsberg	Hungary	United Kingdom		
Bernhard Horwitz	Germany	United Kingdom		
Ernest Klein	Austria	United Kingdom		
Imre König	Austria/Hungary; Yugoslavia	United Kingdom; United States		
Čeněk Kottnauer	Czechoslovakia	United Kingdom		
Paul List	Russian Empire; Germany	United Kingdom		
Johann Löwenthal	Hungary	United Kingdom		
James Mason	United States	United Kingdom		
Olga Menchik	Soviet Union; Czechoslovakia	United Kingdom		
Vera Menchik	Soviet Union; Czechoslovakia	United Kingdom		
Jacques Mieses	Germany	United Kingdom		
Wilhelm Steinitz	Austrian Empire	United Kingdom; United States		
Mir Sultan Khan	India	United Kingdom		
Johannes Zukertort	Poland; Germany	United Kingdom		
Nigel Davies	England	Wales		
Lajos Asztalos	Hungary	(Kingdom of Yugoslavia) Kingdom of Serbs, Croats and Slovenes		
Mirko Bröder	Hungary	(Kingdom of Yugoslavia) Kingdom of Serbs, Croats and Slovenes		
Henrijeta Konarkowska-Sokolov	Poland	Yugoslavia		
Irina Chelushkina	Ukraine	(Serbia and Montenegro) FR Yugoslavia		
Maria Manakova	Russia	(Serbia and Montenegro) FR Yugoslavia		
Svetlana Prudnikova	Russia	(Serbia and Montenegro) FR Yugoslavia		

== To countries in Oceania ==
Name	Previous federation	New federation	Year	Ref.
Romanas Arlauskas	Lithuania	Australia		
Béla Berger	Hungary	Australia		
Igor Bjelobrk	New Zealand	Australia		
Arianne Caoili	Philippines	Australia		
Bobby Cheng	New Zealand	Australia		
Lūcijs Endzelīns	Latvia	Australia		
Temur Kuybokarov	Uzbekistan	Australia		
Naum Levin	Soviet Union	Australia		
Daniela Nuțu-Gajić	Romania	Australia		
Karlis Ozols	Latvia	Australia		
Ngan Phan-Koshnitsky	Vietnam	Australia		
Julia Ryjanova	Russia	Australia		
Lajos Steiner	Hungary	Australia		
Franciszek Sulik	Poland	Australia		
Zhang Jilin	China	Australia		
Lev Aptekar	Soviet Union	New Zealand		
William Fairhurst	England; Scotland	New Zealand		
Helen Milligan	Scotland	New Zealand		
Ortvin Sarapu	Estonia	New Zealand		

== See also ==
- List of sportspeople who competed for more than one nation
- FIDE flag player
