= Aczél =

Aczél is a Hungarian surname meaning "steel". Notable people with the surname include:

- Amir Aczel (1950–2015), Israeli-born American mathematics writer of Hungarian origin; author of books on mathematicians and the history of mathematics
- Gergely Aczél (born 1991), Hungarian chess player
- György Aczél (1917–1991), Hungarian communist politician
- János Aczél (royal secretary) (died 1523), Hungarian poet
- János Aczél (mathematician) (1924–2020), Hungarian-Canadian mathematician
- József Aczél (1900–1945), Hungarian footballer
- Peter Aczel (1941–2023), British mathematician
- Steve Aczel (born 1954), Hungarian/Australian boxer of the 1980s, '90s and 2000s
- Zoltán Aczél (born 1967), Hungarian footballer

== See also ==
- Aczel's anti-foundation axiom
