= Koustav Chatterjee =

Indian chess grandmaster (born 2003)

Personal information
- Born: 21 July 2003 (age 22) Kolkata, India

Chess career
- Country: India
- Title: Grandmaster (2023)
- FIDE rating: 2484 (July 2026)
- Peak rating: 2548 (May 2023)

Koustav Chatterjee is an Indian chess grandmaster.

== Career ==
In October 2021, Koustav scored his first GM-norm at Sheikh Russell GM 2021. He defeated Visakh N. R. and Vignesh N. R., and drew with J. Deepan Chakkravarthy, Michał Krasenkow, Vugar Asadli, and Stany G.A..

Koustav fulfilled the Grandmaster requirements on 31 December 2022, after drawing against Mitrabha Guha in the MPL 59th National Senior Chess Championship. In the 58th edition of the event a year prior, he had scored upset wins against S. P. Sethuraman and Karthikeyan Murali.

== Personal life ==
Koustav is studying finance at the University of Texas at Dallas and played on their chess team. In the 2023 Texas Collegiate Super Finals, he played on board 1 for Team A.
