= Cramling =

Cramling is a surname. Notable people with the surname include:

- Anna Cramling (born 2002), Swedish chess player
- Pia Cramling (born 1963), Swedish chess player
