= Roman Pelts =

Ukrainian-Canadian chess player (1937–2022)

Personal information
- Born: August 11, 1937 Odesa, Ukrainian SSR, Soviet Union
- Died: October 10, 2022 (aged 85) Toronto, Ontario, Canada

Chess career
- Country: Canada
- Title: FIDE Master (1982)
- Peak rating: 2450 (July 1982)

Roman Shlemovich Pelts (August 11, 1937 – October 10, 2022) was a Ukrainian-Canadian chess player.

== Biography ==
Pelts was born in Odesa on August 11, 1937. In 1959, Pelts founded a chess school in Odessa. Seven of his early students became grandmasters: Lev Alburt, Sam Palatnik, Vladimir Tukmakov, Valeri Beim, Konstantin Lerner, Leonid Yurtaev, and Boris Kantsler. He was the official trainer for the 1971 USSR student team that included Anatoly Karpov and Alexander Beliavsky.

At the beginning of his career, he took 15th at Minsk 1962 (Anatoly Bannik won), and played board one on the Soviet national team that won the 1964 Students' World Championship at Kraków, Poland.

Pelts came to Canada in 1978. After moving to Montreal, he established the first Canadian chess school in 1979. He later settled in Toronto and continued his school there. Pelts played for Canada in three Chess Olympiads: at Lucerne 1982 and Thessaloniki 1984 and 1988.

In 1981 Pelts earned the title of FIDE Master. He was inducted into the Canadian Chess Hall of Fame in 2001.

Pelts died in Toronto on October 10, 2022, at the age of 85.

== Publications ==
- (in English) Roman Pelts & Lev Alburt, Comprehensive Chess Course - Volume I, 126 pages
- (in English) Roman Pelts & Lev Alburt, Comprehensive Chess Course - Volume II, 304 pages
- (in French) Roman Pelts & Lev Alburt, Cours complet d'échecs, Éditions Fédération québécoise des échecs (https://fqechecs.qc.ca/), Montréal, 1989, ISBN 2-9801168-2-3 (translation of the above 2 titles)

== See also ==
- Chess Academy of Canada, Roman Pelts' Toronto-based chess school.
