= Visakh =

Visakh may refer to:

- Visakh N. R. Indian chess grandmaster
- Visakh Subramaniam Indian film producer
