= Konikowski =

Konikowski is a Polish surname. Notable people with the surname include:

- Alex Konikowski (1928–1997), American baseball player
- Jerzy Konikowski (born 1947), Polish-German chess player, problemist, and author
