= János Aczél =

János Aczél may refer to:

- János Aczél (royal secretary) (died 1523), Hungarian poet
- János Aczél (mathematician) (1924–2020), Hungarian-Canadian mathematician
