= Yuliya Shvayger =

Israeli chess player (born 1994)

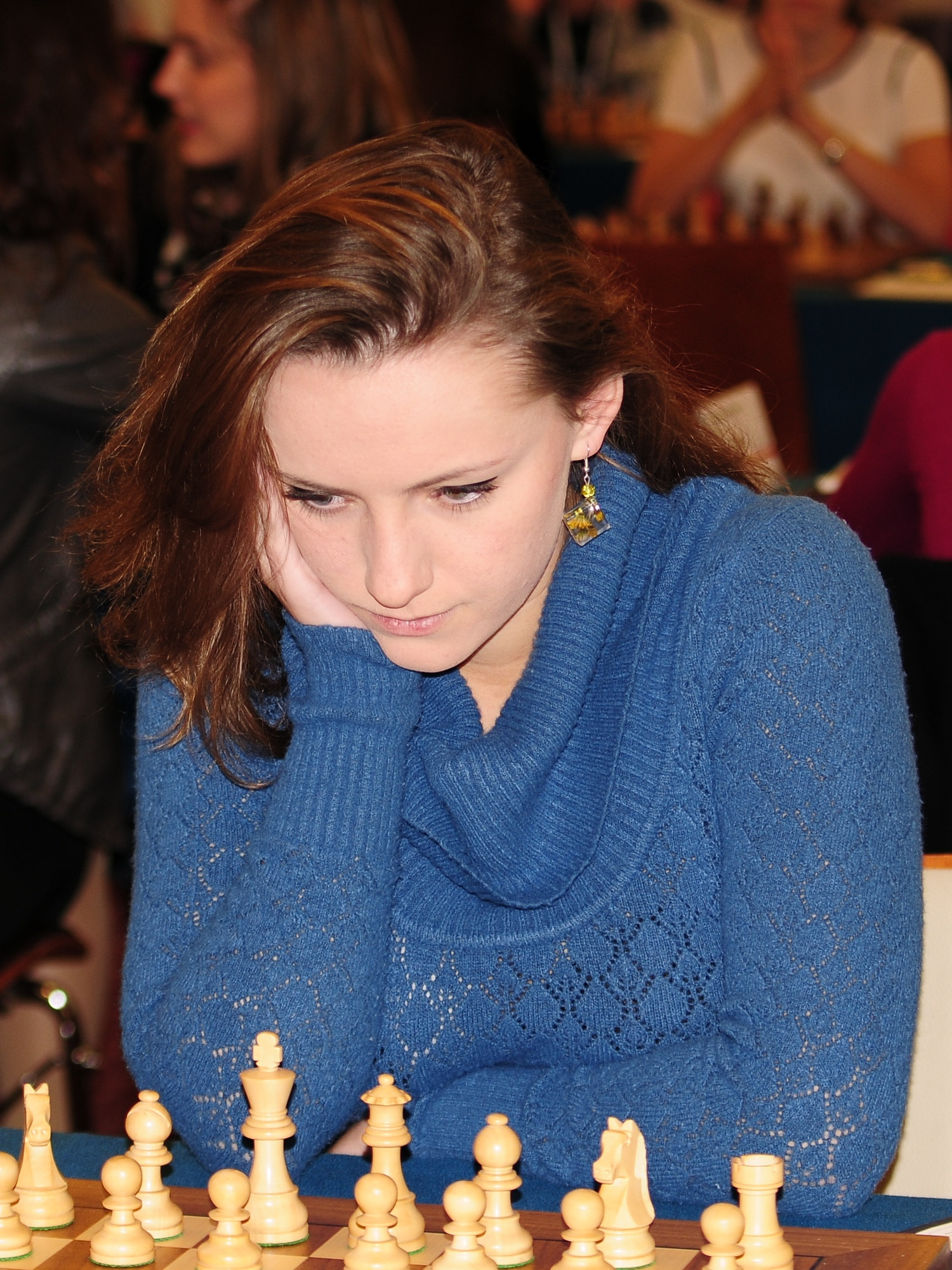
- Shvayger at the European Team Championships 2013

Personal information
- Native name: יוליה שוויגר
- Born: 20 October 1994 (age 31) Vinnytsia, Ukraine
- Spouse: Arkadij Naiditsch (m. 2014)

Chess career
- Country: Ukraine (until 2012); Israel (since 2012)
- Title: International Master (2017); Woman Grandmaster (2017)
- Peak rating: 2442 (September 2017)

Yuliya Shvayger (Hebrew: יוליה שוויגר, Ukrainian: Юлія Швайгер; born 20 October 1994) is an Israeli chess player. She was awarded the titles of International Master (IM) and Woman Grandmaster (WGM) by FIDE in 2017.

== Chess career ==
Originally from Ukraine, Shvayger switched her national federation to Israel in 2012. Since then she has played on the Israeli team at the Women's Chess Olympiad, where in 2016 at the 42nd Chess Olympiad the team, with Shvayger playing at the first board, reached the ninth place in the final ranking. She also played with Israel at the Women's European Team Chess Championship, where in 2013 she won the individual bronze medal on board four. Shvayger competed in the Women's World Chess Championship tournament in 2018. She was knocked out by Monika Soćko in the first round after losing by a score of ½–1½. The following month, Shvayger won the Israeli women's championship edging out Marsel Efroimski on tiebreak, after both players scored 7 points.
