= Georges Philippe (chess player) =

Luxembourgian chess player (1935–2010)

Personal information
- Born: 7 December 1935
- Died: 5 September 2010 (aged 74)

Chess career
- Country: Luxembourg

Georges Philippe (7 December 1935 – 5 September 2010) was a Luxembourgian chess player, four times Luxembourg Chess Championship winner (1958, 1961, 1965, 1966), Chess Olympiad individual bronze medal winner (1976).

== Biography ==
From the end 1950s to the end 1970s Georges Philippe was one of the leading Luxembourgish chess players. He won the Luxembourg Chess Championship four times, in 1958, 1961, 1965, and 1966. In 1955, in Antwerp Georges Philippe participated in World Junior Chess Championship and shared 21st - 22nd place. In 1963, he participated in World Chess Championship European Zonal Tournament.

Georges Philippe played for Luxembourg in the Chess Olympiads:

- In 1954, at third board in the 11th Chess Olympiad in Amsterdam (+0, =0, -11),
- In 1956, at first reserve board in the 12th Chess Olympiad in Moscow (+0, =8, -5),
- In 1962, at second board in the 15th Chess Olympiad in Varna (+6, =4, -10),
- In 1964, at second board in the 16th Chess Olympiad in Tel Aviv (+3, =3, -6),
- In 1966, at first board in the 17th Chess Olympiad in Havana (+3, =6, -6),
- In 1968, at third board in the 18th Chess Olympiad in Lugano (+2, =2, -7),
- In 1970, at second board in the 19th Chess Olympiad in Siegen (+2, =4, -5),
- In 1972, at first board in the 20th Chess Olympiad in Skopje (+2, =3, -7),
- In 1974, at second reserve board in the 21st Chess Olympiad in Nice (+5, =5, -4),
- In 1976, at first reserve board in the 22nd Chess Olympiad in Haifa (+5, =3, -1) and won individual bronze medal,
- In 1978, at second reserve board in the 23rd Chess Olympiad in Buenos Aires (+3, =4, -2).

Georges Philippe played for Luxembourg in the European Team Chess Championship preliminaries:

- In 1973, at second reserve board in the 5th European Team Chess Championship preliminaries (+0, =0, -2).

Georges Philippe also played correspondence chess. His main achievement in the correspondence chess is the victory in the B tournament of the Eduard Dyckhoff memorial (1954–1956).
