= Daniel Quizon =

Filipino chess grandmaster (born 2004)

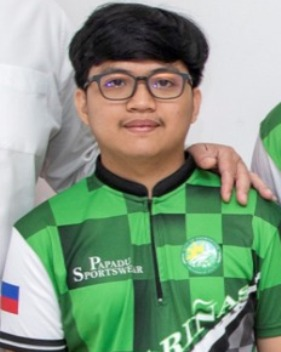
- Quizon in 2024

Personal information
- Born: November 10, 2004 (age 21) Rizal, Philippines

Chess career
- Country: Philippines
- Title: Grandmaster (2024)
- FIDE rating: 2432 (July 2026)
- Peak rating: 2499 (October 2024)

Daniel Quizon (born November 10, 2004) is a Filipino chess player and the current Philippine Chess Champion. He was awarded the title of Grandmaster (GM) by FIDE in 2024.

== Chess Career ==
Quizon qualified to play in the Chess World Cup 2021, where he was defeated 1.5-0.5 by Evgeny Bareev in the first round.

He won the AQ Prime ASEAN Chess Championship in February 2023, earning him a GM norm. in June 2023, he earned his second norm after he went unbeaten at the ASEAN+ Age Group Chess Championships in Bangkok, Thailand.

On March 31, 2024, Quizon defeated Nguyễn Anh Dũng and win the Hanoi Grandmaster Chess Tournament claiming his third and final GM norm in Vietnam. Quizon earned his final grandmaster norm on September 14, 2024, after defeating GM Igor Efimov in the 45th Chess Olympiad.

Quizon qualified for the Chess World Cup 2025 where he lost to Russian Grandmaster Aleksey Grebnev 1.5-0.5 in the first round.
