= Vignesh N. R. =

Indian chess grandmaster (born 1998)

Personal information
- Born: 24 January 1998 (age 28) Thiruvananthapuram, India

Chess career
- Country: India
- Title: Grandmaster (2023)
- FIDE rating: 2512 (July 2026)
- Peak rating: 2542 (June 2024)

Vignesh Narayanan Rajeshwari is an Indian chess grandmaster.

== Career ==
Vignesh earned his first GM norm at the 2015 Qatar Masters Open by defeating Mateusz Bartel and Wei Yi, and drawing with Nguyễn Ngọc Trường Sơn, Sam Shankland, Vladimir Fedoseev, Hou Yifan, and Francesco Rambaldi.

Vignesh earned his second GM norm at the 24th Abu Dhabi Masters 2017, where he won against Karthikeyan Murali and Bogdan-Daniel Deac, and drew with Mircea-Emilian Parligras, Parham Maghsoodloo, Tsegmed Batchuluun, and Constantin Lupulescu.

Vignesh earned his final GM norm at the 1st Gujarat GM Open 2018, where he finished in second place with a score of 8/10. He won against Farrukh Amonatov and Vitaly Sivuk, and drew with Vadim Malakhatko and Vitaliy Bernadskiy.

In January 2023, Vignesh became a GM when his live rating surpassed 2500 by defeating Ilja Schneider in the final round of the 24th NordWest Cup, also winning the tournament. With this, Vignesh and his brother Visakh N. R. became the first pair of Indian siblings and brothers to become grandmasters.

In August 2023, Vignesh won the 11th Pontevedra Masters, where he was undefeated during the tournament and finished half a point ahead of second place.

== Personal life ==
His younger brother is Visakh N. R., who is also a Grandmaster. Vignesh is employed at Southern Railway.
