= Charles Doerner =

Luxembourgian chess player

Personal information
- Born: 27 February 1912
- Died: unknown

Chess career
- Country: Luxembourg

Charles Doerner (27 February 1912 – unknown) was a Luxembourgian chess player, eleven times Luxembourg Chess Championship winner (1935, 1938, 1939, 1940, 1946, 1947, 1948, 1949, 1950, 1951, 1952).

== Biography ==
From the mid-1930s to the mid-1950s Charles Doerner was the leading Luxembourgish chess player. He eleven times won Luxembourg Chess Championships: in 1935, 1938, 1939, 1940, 1946, 1947, 1948, 1949, 1950, 1951, and 1952. Charles Doerner was member of chess club Esch Rochade. He participated in international chess tournament in Maastricht (1946) and Zonal tournament in Hilversum (1947).

Charles Doerner played for Luxembourg in the Chess Olympiads:

- In 1952, at first board in the 10th Chess Olympiad in Helsinki (+1, =1, -12),
- In 1954, at first board in the 11th Chess Olympiad in Amsterdam (+2, =3, -4).

Charles Doerner played for Luxembourg in the European Team Chess Championship preliminaries:

- In 1957, at first board in the 1st European Team Chess Championship preliminaries (+0, =1, -1).
