= Igor Efimov (chess player) =

Georgian-Monégasque chess grandmaster (born 1960)

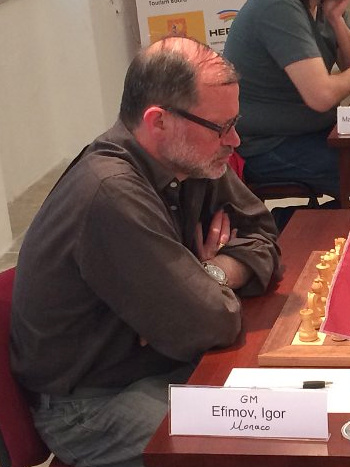
- Efimov in 2014

Personal information
- Born: September 16, 1960 (age 66) Tbilisi, Georgia

Chess career
- Country: Soviet Union (until 1992); Georgia (1992–1996); Italy (1996–2007); Monaco (since 2007)
- Title: Grandmaster (1992)
- Peak rating: 2540 (July 1997)

Igor Borisovich Efimov is a Georgian chess grandmaster who plays for Monaco.

== Chess career ==
He won the Italian Chess Championship in 1997 and 1998.

In February 2017, he won the Monaco Chess Championship, where he tied for first place with Igor Berezowsky but prevailed on tiebreak scores.

As of October 2020, he was one of two grandmasters in Monaco, alongside David Marciano.

In June 2024, he won the European Small Nations Individual Chess Championship by scoring 8/9 without any losses and finishing ahead of Fred Berend and Serni Ribera Veganzones.

In September 2024, he played for Monaco at the 45th Chess Olympiad. At the event, he was defeated by Daniel Quizon, who became a grandmaster after their game.

He played in the Chess World Cup 2025, where he was defeated by Ediz Gürel in the first round.
