= Elvira Berend =

Luxembourgian chess player (born 1965)

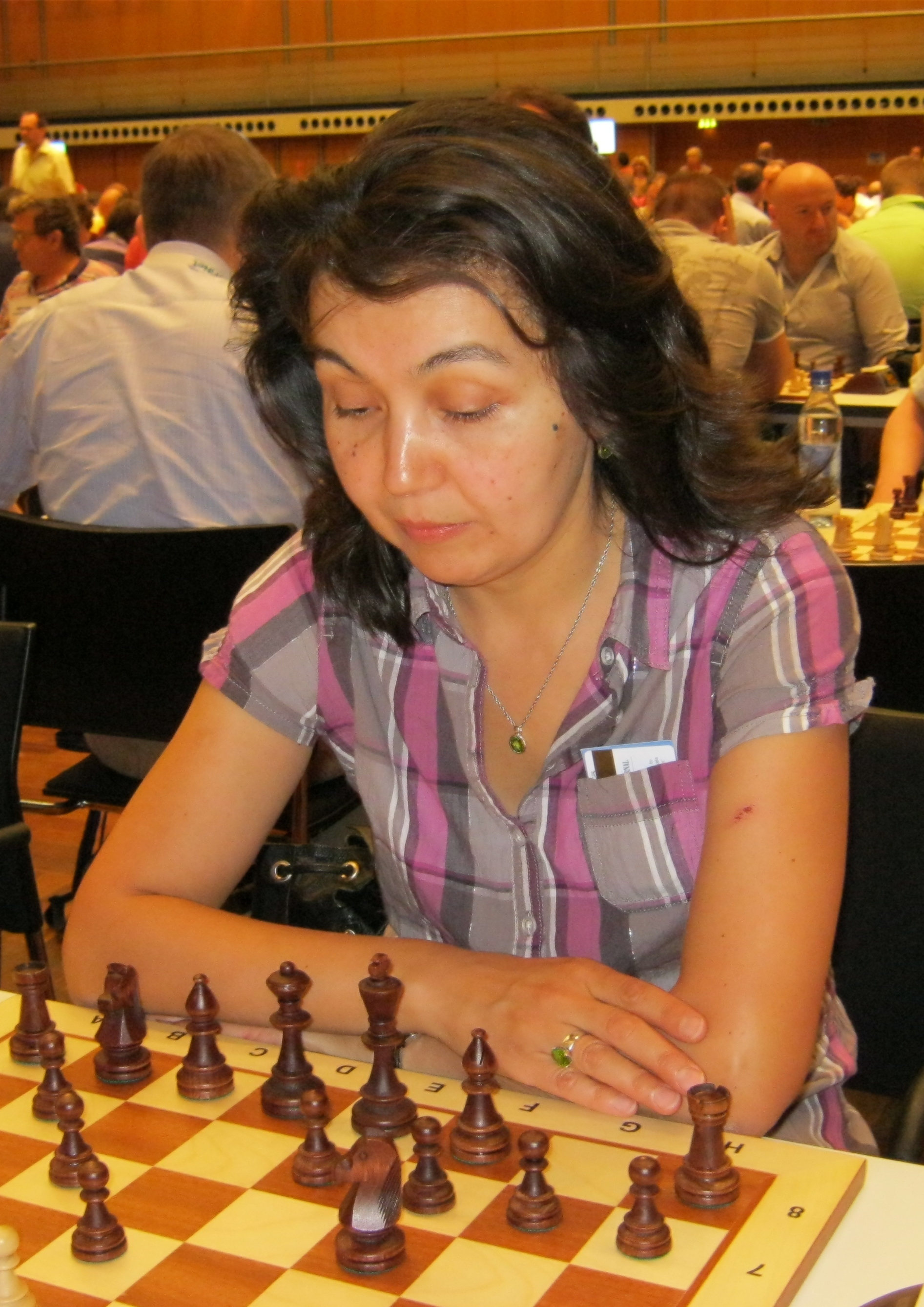
- Berend in 2010

Personal information
- Full name: Elvira Bayakhmetovna Berend
- Born: 19 September 1965 (age 61) Almaty, Kazakhstan
- Spouse: Fred Berend

Chess career
- Country: Soviet Union (until 1991) Kazakhstan (1992–1997) Luxembourg (since 1997)
- Title: FIDE Woman Grandmaster (1995); ICCF Lady International Master (2014)
- Peak rating: 2375 (April 2016)

Elvira Bayakhmetovna Berend (Kazakh: Эльвира Баяхметқызы Беренд; née Sakhatova (Сахатова); born 19 September 1965) is a Kazakhstan-born Luxembourg chess player who holds the FIDE title of Woman Grandmaster (WGM). She is a three-time Luxembourg Chess Championship winner (1998, 2015, 2016) and four-time World Women's Over 50 Chess Championship winner (2017, 2018, 2019, 2022).

== Biography ==
She is the younger sister of WIM Gulnar Sachs (née Sakhatova). In 1988, she took part in the USSR Women's Chess Championship final and finished in 12th place. She twice represented the Kazakh SSR team in the Soviet Team Chess Championships (1986, 1991), in which she won a team silver medal in 1991. After the dissolution of the Soviet Union, she represented Kazakhstan. In 1995, Elvira Berend participated in Women's World Chess Championship Interzonal Tournament in Chişinău where she finished in 14th place. In 1997, in Athens she won the European Women's Fast Chess Championship, and also the international chess tournament in Luxembourg City. In the second half of the 1990s, she married the Luxembourg International Master Fred Berend, and since 1997 has been representing Luxembourg in chess tournaments. She holds the unique distinction of winning the open championship of her country three times.

Elvira Berend played for Kazakhstan and Luxembourg:

- in Women's Chess Olympiads participated 5 times (1992–1996, 2004, 2008) and won individual bronze medal;
- in Open Chess Olympiad participated in 2014;
- in European Open Team Chess Championship participated in 2005;
- in Women's Asian Team Chess Championship participated in 1995 and won team bronze and individual silver medals.

In 1995, she became the first chess player in Kazakhstan to receive the FIDE Woman Grandmaster (WGM) title.

As of July 2022, Berend is the second highest-rated player representing Luxembourg, behind IM Michael Wiedenkeller.
