= Dan Cramling =

Swedish chess player (born 1959)

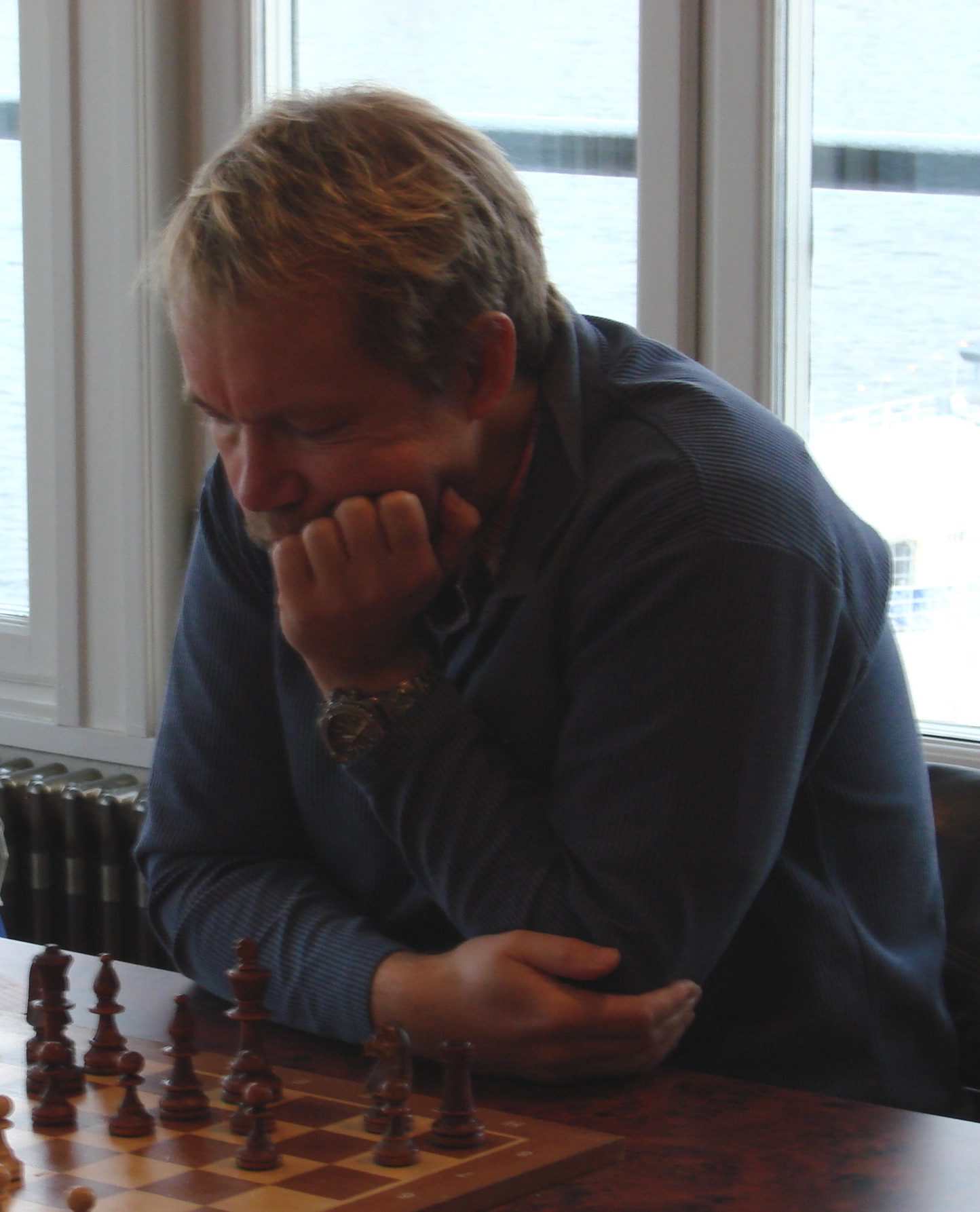

Personal information
- Born: February 5, 1959 (age 67) Stockholm, Sweden

Chess career
- Country: Sweden
- Title: International Master (1982)
- Peak rating: 2450 (January 1994)

Dan Cramling is a Swedish chess player.

== Career ==
He joined a chess club in his childhood, which served as inspiration for his sister Pia to join. He was also her early training partner.

He won the Swedish Junior Championship in 1975 and the Swedish Chess Championship in 1981.

== Personal life ==
He is the older brother of grandmaster Pia Cramling and the uncle of Anna Cramling.
