= Stefan Fazekas =

Czechoslovak-British chess player

Stefan (István, Stephan) Fazekas (23 March 1898 – 3 May 1967) was a Czechoslovak–British chess master.

Born in Austria-Hungary, he lived in Czechoslovakia after World War I. In 1938, he emigrated to England.

In 1925, he tied for 8–9th in Bratislava (Richard Réti won). In 1926, he tied for 10–11th in Budapest (Max Walter won). In 1929, he took 2nd in Košice. In 1930, he tied for 3rd–4th in Prague (Salo Flohr won). In 1931, he took 3rd in Brno (Flohr won). In 1935, he tied for 2nd–4th in Luhačovice (Karel Opočensky won). In 1936, he tied for 17–18th in Poděbrady (Flohr won).

In 1940, he took 9th in London (Harry Golombek and Paul List won). Dr Fazekas was British Champion in 1957, and is the oldest player ever to have won the title. In 1962–1964, he played in 4th World Correspondence Chess Championship (semifinal).

Fazekas was awarded the IM title in 1953 and the IMC title in 1964.
