= Olivér Mihók =

Hungarian chess grandmaster (born 1993)

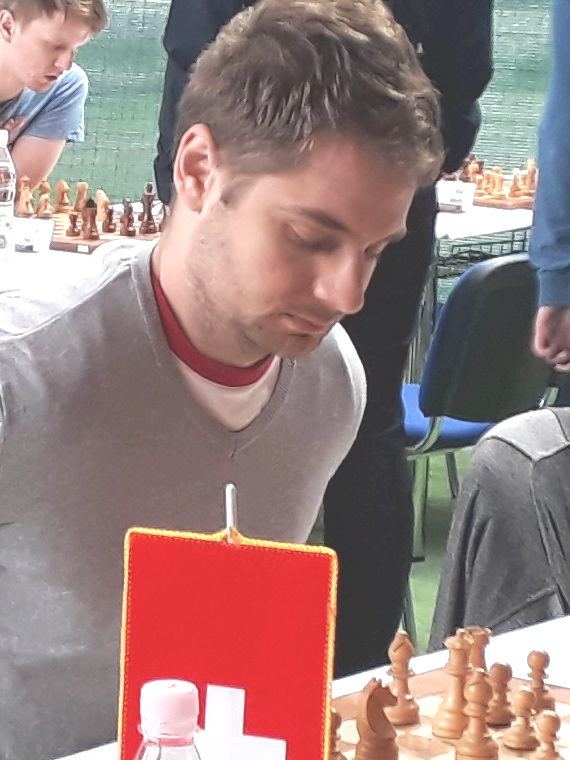

Personal information
- Born: June 23, 1993 (age 33) Budapest, Hungary

Chess career
- Country: Hungary
- Title: Grandmaster (2015)
- FIDE rating: 2499 (July 2026)
- Peak rating: 2567 (December 2019)

Olivér Mihók is a Hungarian chess grandmaster.

== Chess career ==
In June 2011, he won a First Saturday GM tournament, finishing ahead of three grandmasters.

In September 2014, he won the individual section of the Construct Balaton Cup.

He achieved the Grandmaster title in 2015, earning his norms at the:

- First Saturday Borloy Androvitzku Karoly Memorial GM tournament in August 2010
- International Boeblinger Open A tournament in December 2014
- Chess in Kecskemet GM tournament in August 2015

== Personal life ==
He attended the Budapest University of Technology and Economics. In March 2014, he played for the university's team in the Hungarian University-College National Championships, winning the team section (with teammates Vilmos Handó and Gergely Aczel) and finishing second in the individual section.
