= Anna Cramling =

Swedish chess player (born 2002)

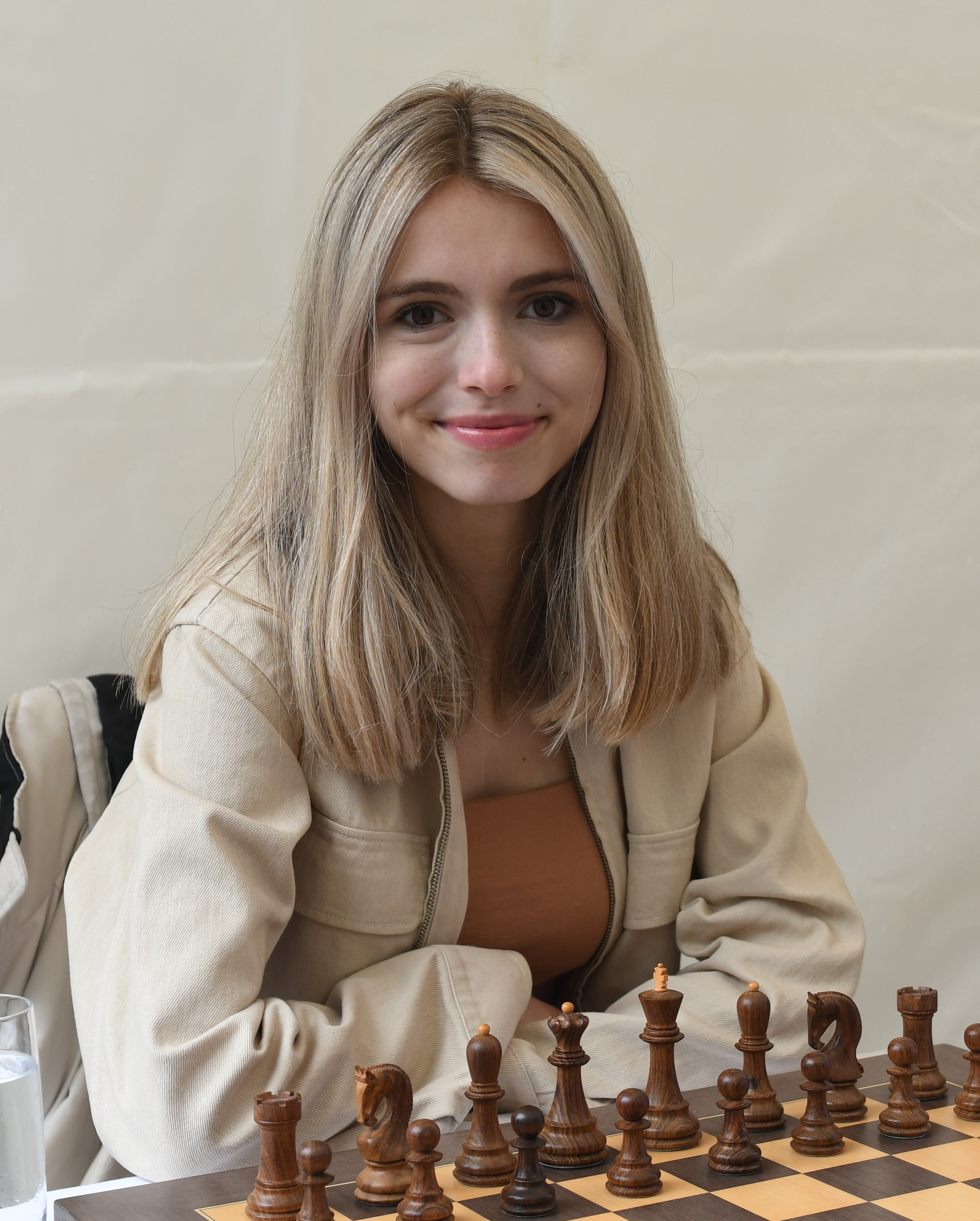
- Cramling in 2021
- Born: Anna Yolanda Cramling Bellón; 30 April 2002 (age 24); Málaga, Spain
- Parents: Juan Manuel Bellón López (father); Pia Cramling (mother)
- Relatives: Dan Cramling (uncle)
- Chess career
- Country: Spain (until 2014); Sweden (since 2014)
- Title: Woman FIDE Master (2018)
- FIDE rating: 2106 (June 2026)
- Peak rating: 2175 (March 2018)

Twitch information
- Channel: AnnaCramling
- Years active: 2020–present
- Genre: Gaming
- Game: Chess
- Followers: 490K

YouTube information
- Channels: AnnaCramling; Anna Cramling Español
- Subscribers: 1.64 million
- Views: 813 million
- Last updated: July 28, 2025

Anna Yolanda Cramling Bellón (born 30 April 2002) is a Spanish-Swedish chess player, Twitch live streamer, and YouTuber who holds the title of Woman FIDE Master (WFM). She had a peak FIDE rating of 2175 in March 2018. Cramling represented Sweden in the 2016, 2022 and 2026 Chess Olympiads as well as two European Team Chess Championships.

Cramling grew up in a chess-playing family. Her mother is Swedish grandmaster (GM) Pia Cramling, and her father is Spanish GM Juan Manuel Bellón López. She began playing chess at age three in Spain, moving with her family to Sweden at age eleven and switching federations from Spain to Sweden soon afterwards. She participated in several European Youth, World Cadets, World Youth, and World Junior Chess Championships in different age divisions from 2015 until 2019. When representing Sweden in international team competitions, she has played on the same team with her mother while her father has served as the team captain.

Cramling earned the title of Woman FIDE Master (WFM) in 2018 at age 15, the same year she reached her peak rating. In 2018, she defeated Renier Castellanos Rodriguez, a Spanish International Master (IM) with a FIDE rating of 2498 at the time.

Cramling began streaming in early 2020, focusing on chess content. Her mother and father are both occasional guests on her channel. About a year later, Cramling signed with the Panda esports organization as their first chess streamer.

== Early life and background ==
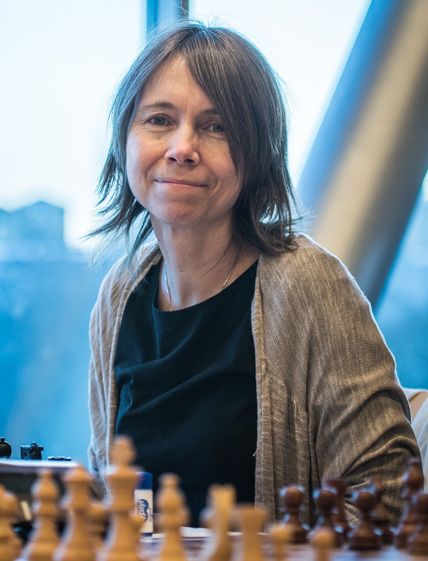
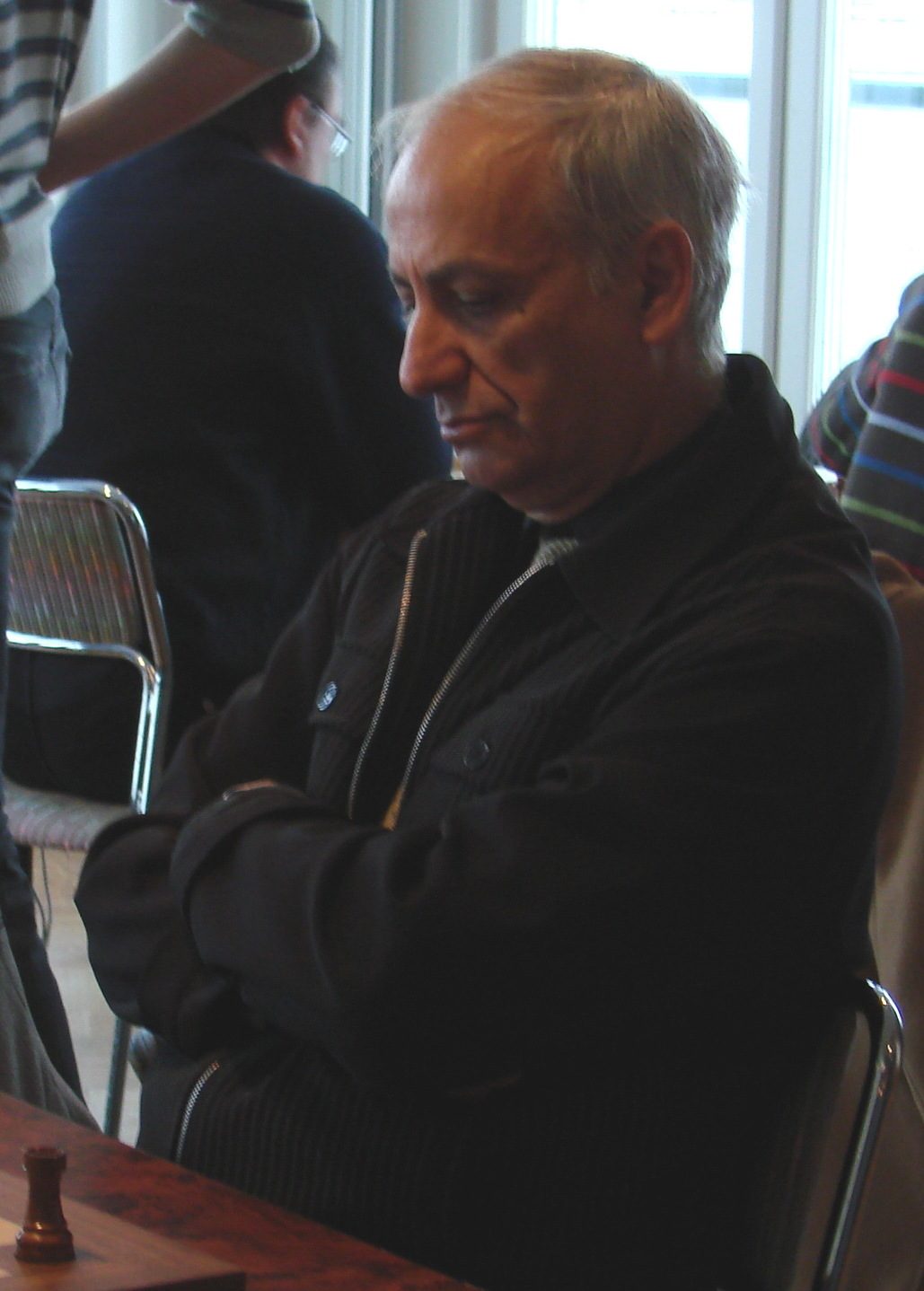
Anna Cramling's parents, GM Pia Cramling (left) and GM Juan Manuel Bellón López (right)

Cramling was born on 30 April 2002 in Málaga to Pia Cramling and Juan Manuel Bellón López. Her mother is from Sweden and her father is from Spain. Both of her parents are chess players and both hold the Grandmaster (GM) title. Her mother was No. 1 in the world among women by FIDE rating in 1984 and became the fifth woman ever to achieve the GM title in 1992. Her father is a five-time Spanish champion. Cramling began playing chess at age three. Throughout her childhood, both of her parents were actively competing at chess. When she was young, she typically accompanied her parents to chess tournaments because her only regular babysitter was her maternal grandfather, who lived in Sweden. Cramling and her parents lived in Spain until she was eleven years old, when they moved to Sweden. Cramling switched federations from Spain to Sweden in 2014, having only played in a few tournaments while representing Spain. Her father later made the same federation switch in 2017.

== Chess career ==
Cramling earned her first FIDE rating in February 2013 at age 10, starting out at 1519 after playing the Amateur A competition at the Gibraltar Chess Festival. She won one out of four games against rated opponents, defeating Raymond Kearsley, an English player rated 1772. The following year, 2014, she won the women's prize in the same Amateur A competition at Gibraltar. Her prize drew media attention because her parents regularly competed at the event and she had regularly been attending even as an infant. This performance also helped her reach a rating of 1600.

Cramling had a large increase in rating in early 2015 at age 12 when she gained over 300 rating points across four tournaments in two months to surpass a rating of 1900. These tournaments included the Rilton under-1800 tournament in Stockholm around New Year's Day and the Amateur A and Amateur B competitions at Gibraltar. At the end of 2015, Cramling participated in the girls under-14 division of the World Cadets Chess Championship in Porto Carras, Greece. As the 58th seed out of 125 participants, she finished slightly better than her seeding in 54th place with a score of 6/11. (Note: 6 points in 11 games. (A win is 1 point, a draw is a ½ point, and a loss is 0 points.)) Cramling first reached a rating of 2000 in June 2016 at age 14 after competing in the Hasselbacken Chess Open in Stockholm. Her best victory in that tournament was against her compatriot Michael Backman, who was rated 2161.

In September 2016, 14-year old Cramling represented Sweden in the 2016 Chess Olympiad in Baku, Azerbaijan, thereby beating the Swedish record for youngest female participant in the Olympiad, which was previously held by her mother and Siv Bengtsson. Her mother Pia also competed at the event, and they had Anna's father as team captain. Cramling competed in 7 of the 11 rounds which contributed to Sweden placing 23rd out of the 134 competing teams. In early 2017, Cramling played the Masters competition in Gibraltar, during which she drew a game against her father. Towards the end of the year, she played both the European Youth Chess Championships in the girls under-16 division and World Junior Chess Championships in the girls under-20 division. She performed well at both, gaining 17 and 31 rating points at each tournament respectively. She finished in 35th place out of 75 participants in the former, and 61st out of 89 participants at the latter, similar to her respective seedings of 31st and 66th.

Cramling earned the Woman FIDE Master (WFM) title in 2018. She gained about another 200 points in early 2018 to reach her career-best rating of 2175 by virtue of good performances across four tournaments. She had an even score in the Challenger B competition in Gibraltar against opponents with an average rating of 2151 and followed up that result with a perfect score of 4/4 at the Elite Hotels Open in Sweden, during which she defeated two players with a rating of about 2200. During the Open Internacional Villa de Benasque in Spain in July 2018, Cramling again defeated Renier Castellanos Rodriguez, a Spanish International Master (IM) rated 2498. Towards the end of the year, she participated in both the girls under-20 division of the World Junior Championships and the girls under-16 division of the World Youth Championships. She again finished similar to her seeding of 57th in the former, coming in 54th place out of 98 competitors. In contrast, she underperformed in the youth championships and finished in 59th place out of 90 competitors compared to her seed of 30th, which led to her rating declining to below 2000.

After that decline in rating in late 2018, Cramling was able to regain most of her lost rating points in 2019, reaching a year-high rating of 2164 in October. Her best tournament of the year was the European Youth Championships. As the 33rd seed in the under-18 girls' division, Cramling finished in 13th place with a score of 5 1/2/9, gaining 103 rating points. Her best victory in the tournament was against Govhar Beydullayeva, an Azerbaijani WFM rated 2307.

=== 2020s onward ===
Since 2020, Cramling has played in few competitions, partly because of her becoming a streamer, and partly because of the COVID-19 pandemic, which limited the number of over-the-board tournaments in operation. In September 2022, Cramling represented Sweden (alongside her mother Pia) in the 2022 Chess Olympiad in Chennai, India, playing board 3 and competing in 10 of the 11 rounds, winning three games and drawing four. From 10 to 21 November 2023, Cramling played in the 2023 European Team Chess Championship as a member of the women's team from Sweden, which finished the tournament ranked 22 out of 32 entrants. As the highest-rated player on her team, she played board one, winning three games, drawing two, and losing three, for a total of four out of a possible eight points.

=== Team competitions ===
Cramling has represented Sweden in the women's divisions at one Chess Olympiad and two European Team Chess Championships. In each of these tournaments, she competed on the same team as her mother Pia Cramling while her father Juan Bellón López was the team captain. At the 2016 Chess Olympiad in Baku, she played on the reserve board behind her mother on the top board followed by Inna Agrest, Jessica Bengtsson, and Angelina Fransson. Both Cramling and the team overall had good performances. With a score of 14 points (+7–4=0), (Note: 7 wins, 4 losses, 0 draws) Sweden finished in 23rd place out of 134 teams, far ahead of their seeding of 43rd. Individually, Cramling had a score of 3/7, gaining 17 rating points. She declined to compete at the 2018 Chess Olympiad in Batumi because her mother Pia was not going to be on the team. Pia decided not to participate after Swedish Chess Federation manager Anders Wengholm did not select Bellón López as the women's team captain. Cramling played at the European Team Chess Championship in 2019 and 2021. She played on the third board in 2019 behind her mother and Ellinor Frisk, and was again on the reserve board in 2021. Individually, she fared better in 2021, scoring 3/5 and gaining 22 rating points. In 2022, Cramling played board 3 in the 44th Chess Olympiad individually scoring 5/10 (+3-3=4), giving her a TPR of 2099. (Note: 3 wins, 3 losses, 4 draws. This includes: 3 wins against Cyrel Terubea (1450), Danielle Bedrosian (1662), and Hng Mei-Xian Eunice (1823); 4 draws against WIM Lina Nassr (2011), WGM Masha Klinova (2251), WIM Rosa Ratsma (2226), and WIM Sahithi Varshini M (2312); 3 losses against IM Marta Garcia Martin (2305), IM Szidonia Vajda (2313) and WGM Karolina Pilsova (2230))

== Playing style ==
Cramling has a strong preference for playing 1.d4 (the Queen's Pawn Game) with the white pieces over any other first move. Cramling believes she combines her mother's opening style with her father's aggressive style:

I think that I play very aggressively, especially when I play online. It's just more fun! I'd say I got that from my father, as he's definitely a very aggressive and tactical chess player. In that sense I play a lot like him, and in terms of openings, I play a lot that are similar to my mother's openings, because she used to teach me a lot of them. So I guess I'd say I play my mum's openings with my dad's style!

Position: a8 black rook, c8 black bishop, d8 black queen, e8 black king, f8 black bishop, h8 black rook, a7 black pawn, b7 black pawn, c7 black pawn, f7 black pawn, g7 black pawn, h7 black pawn, b6 black knight, d6 black pawn, e6 black pawn, g6 black knight, b3 white knight, d3 white pawn, e3 white pawn, g3 white knight, a2 white pawn, b2 white pawn, c2 white pawn, f2 white pawn, g2 white pawn, h2 white pawn, a1 white rook, c1 white bishop, d1 white queen, e1 white king, f1 white bishop, h1 white rook

Symmetrical cow opening (Black and White both playing "The Cow")

In 2023, Cramling pioneered a new chess opening which she named "The Cow", a variation of Van 't Kruijs Opening that is reminiscent of the Hippopotamus Defence and playable with either the black or white pieces. The opening variation is characterized by White opening with 1.e3, 2.d3, 3.Ne2, 4.Nd2, 5.Nb3, and 6.Ng3, regardless of how Black responds. In March 2024, chess.com added a version of this opening to its list of recognized opening variations. They characterized the canonical moves as "1.e3 d5 2.d3 e5 3.Ne2 Bd6 4.Ng3 Nf6 5.Nd2". In the first round of the Reykjavík Open on March 15, 2024, Cramling lost to Grandmaster Platon Galperin who played "The Cow" against her. It was the first time Cramling had faced her own opening in a classical chess tournament.

== Streaming career ==
Cramling launched her own Twitch channel in early 2020 after having the chance to commentate with her mother Pia on the 2020 Women's World Chess Championship match between Ju Wenjun and Aleksandra Goryachkina earlier in the year. On occasion, her mother joins her on Twitch to play games or give advice. On rarer occasions, her father does as well. After about a year of streaming on Twitch, she signed with the Panda esports team, becoming their first chess streamer as well as the first Swedish chess player to sign with such an esports organisation.

== Awards and nominations ==
Ceremony	Year	Category	Result	Ref.
The Streamer Awards	2022	Best Chess Streamer	Nominated	
The Streamer Awards	2023	Best Chess Streamer	Nominated	
The Streamer Awards	2024	Best Strategy Game Streamer	Won	
