= Luxembourg Chess Championship =

The Luxembourg Chess Championship has been held since 1932 by the Luxembourg Chess Federation (French: Fédération Luxembourgeoise des Échecs, FLDE), which was established in 1931 and joined FIDE in 1946.

== Winners ==
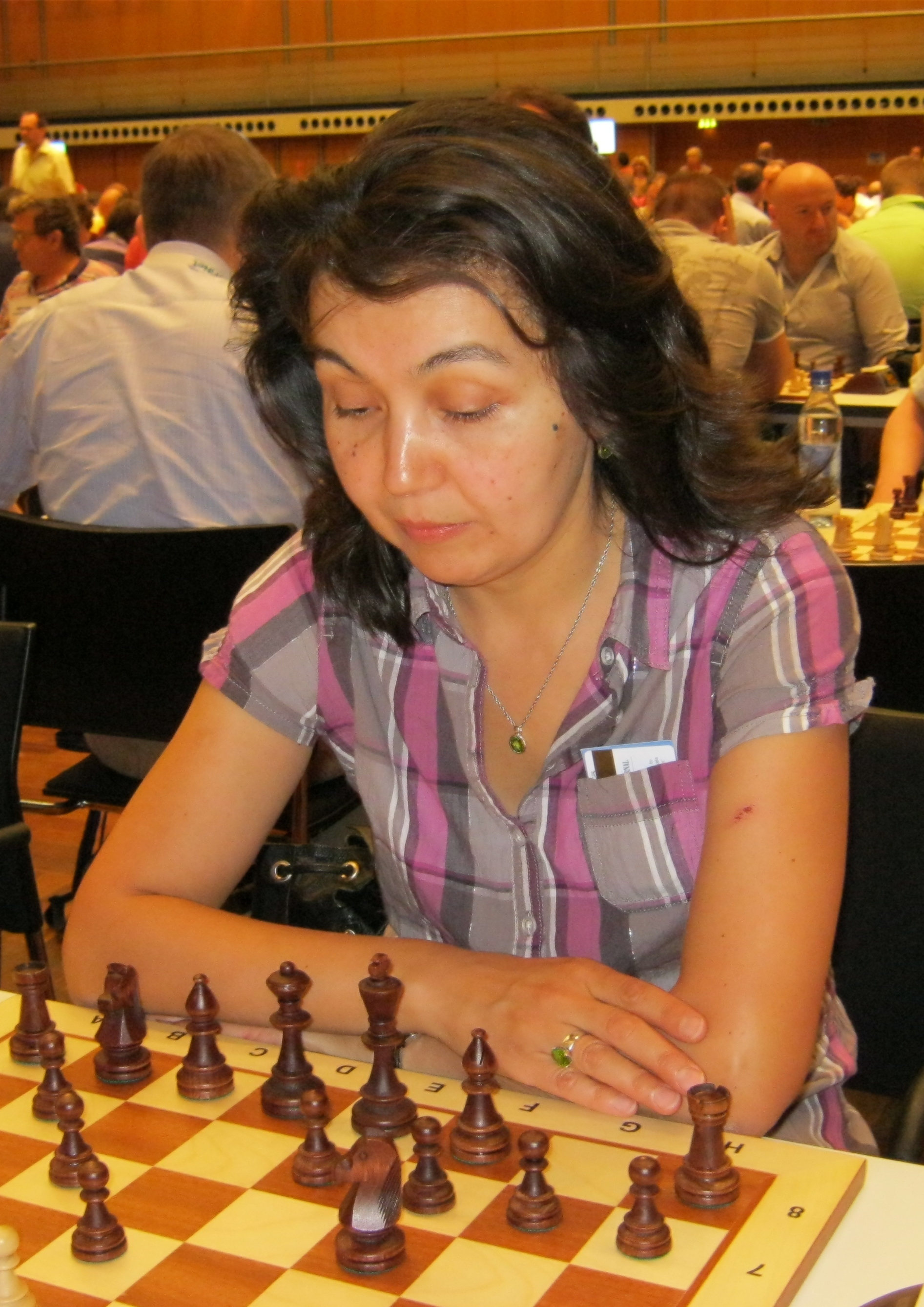
Elvira Berend, Luxembourg champion in 1998, 2015 and 2016

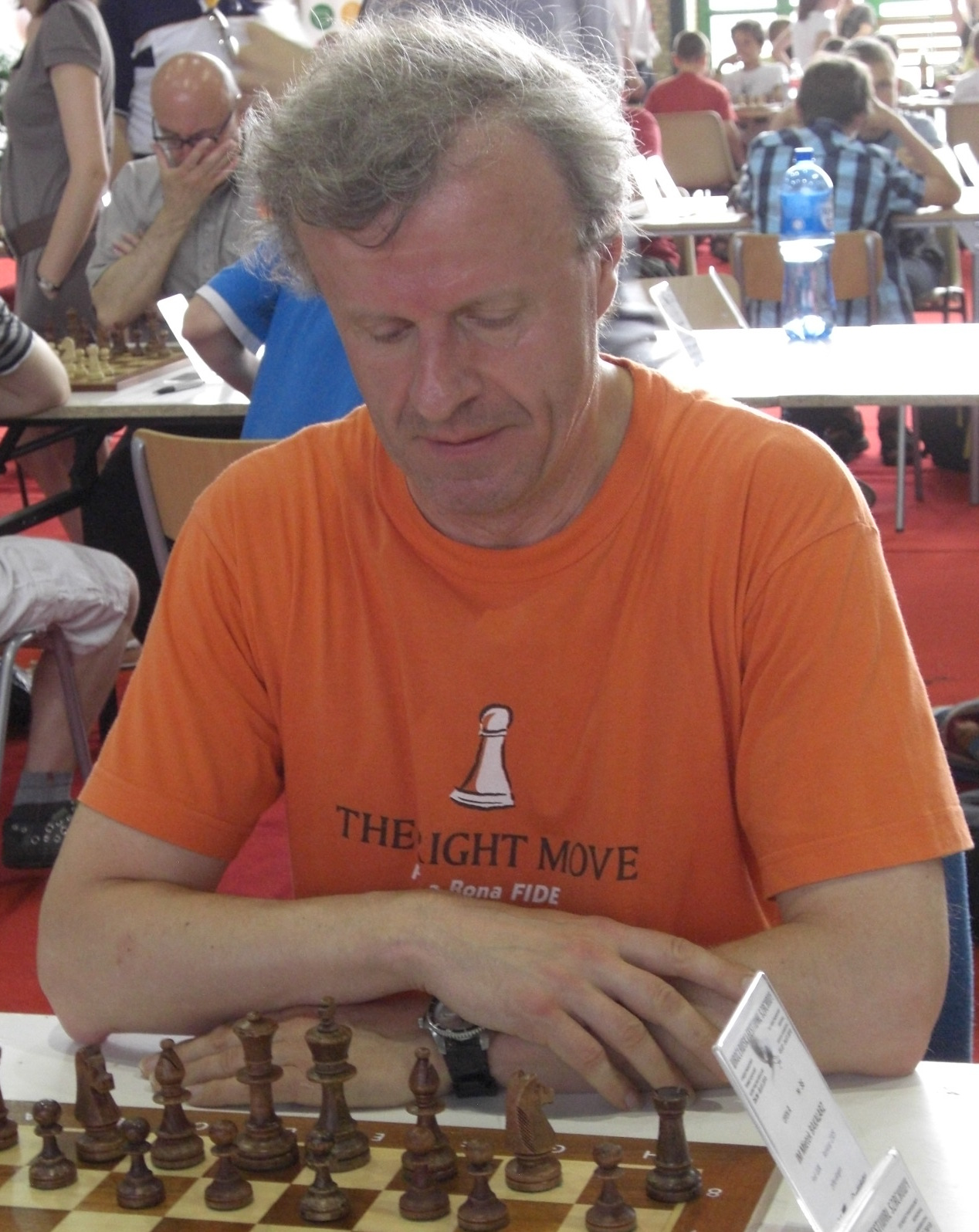
Mietek Bakalarz, Luxembourg champion in 2003, 2009 and 2011

| Year | Luxembourg Champion |
|---|---|
| 1932 | Francis Kraus |
| 1933 | Louis Philippe |
| 1934 | Louis Philippe |
| 1935 | Charles Doerner |
| 1936 | Francis Kraus |
| 1937 | Francis Kraus |
| 1938 | Charles Doerner |
| 1939 | Charles Doerner |
| 1940 | Charles Doerner |
| 1946 | Charles Doerner |
| 1947 | Charles Doerner |
| 1948 | Charles Doerner |
| 1949 | Charles Doerner |
| 1950 | Charles Doerner |
| 1951 | Charles Doerner |
| 1952 | Charles Doerner |
| 1953 | Eugène Bestgen |
| 1954 | Aloyse Neu |
| 1955 | Fernand Wantz |
| 1956 | Fernand Wantz |
| 1958 | Georges Philippe |
| 1959 | Aloyse Neu |
| 1960 | Alphonse Conrady |
| 1961 | Georges Philippe |
| 1962 | Eugène Bestgen |
| 1963 | Eugène Bestgen |
| 1964 | Alphonse Conrady |
| 1965 | Georges Philippe |
| 1966 | Georges Philippe |
| 1967 | Josy Feller |
| 1968 | Josy Feller |
| 1969 | Raymond Schneider |
| 1971 | Josy Feller |
| 1973 | Josy Feller |
| 1975 | Norbert Stull |
| 1976 | Norbert Stull |
| 1977 | Georges Haas |
| 1978 | Georges Haas |
| 1979 | Norbert Stull |
| 1980 | Georges Haas |
| 1981 | Jean Schammo |
| 1982 | Josy Feller |
| 1983 | Norbert Stull |
| 1985 | Hubert Mossong |
| 1986 | Roger Hofmann |
| 1987 | Georges Haas |
| 1988 | Shlomo Marcovici |
| 1989 | Norbert Stull |
| 1990 | Fred Berend |
| 1991 | Norbert Stull |
| 1992 | Hubert Mossong |
| 1993 | Alain Schartz |
| 1994 | Lucien Gaspar |
| 1995 | Carlo Menghi |
| 1996 | Camille Wians |
| 1997 | Marc Mertens |
| 1998 | Elvira Berend |
| 1999 | Guy Monaville |
| 2000 | Claude Wagener |
| 2001 | Josy Feller |
| 2002 | Alain Schartz |
| 2003 | Mietek Bakalarz |
| 2004 | Jean-Marie Weber |
| 2005 | Vlad Serban |
| 2006 | Tom Weber |
| 2007 | Jean-Marie Weber |
| 2008 | Alain Schartz |
| 2009 | Mietek Bakalarz |
| 2010 | Vlad Serban |
| 2011 | Mietek Bakalarz |
| 2012 | Michael Wiedenkeller |
| 2013 | Michael Wiedenkeller |
| 2014 | Fred Berend |
| 2015 | Elvira Berend |
| 2016 | Elvira Berend |
| 2017 | Fred Berend |
| 2018 | Jean-Marie Weber |
