= Michael Feygin =

Ukrainian-German chess grandmaster (born 1975)

- Michael Feygin in 2014

Personal information
- Born: February 1, 1975 (age 51) Kharkiv, Soviet Union

Chess career
- Country: Ukraine (until 2005); Germany (since 2005)
- Title: Grandmaster (2013)
- FIDE rating: 2436 (November 2026)
- Peak rating: 2569 (July 2008)

Michael Feygin (born 1 February 1975) is a Ukrainian-German chess Grandmaster.

At the 1998 Dortmund Sparkassen Chess Meeting, he played in Open A and finished in shared second place alongside Aivars Gipslis and Ludger Keitlinghaus, behind Dirk Poldauf.

He became a FIDE Master in 1995, an International Master in 1996, and was awarded the title of Grandmaster by FIDE in January 2013. He achieved his Grandmaster norms at the 2007 European Club Cup in Antalya, in the 2009–10 Belgian Team Championship, and in the 2011–12 Schachbundesliga.

Feygin has played in the Schachbundesliga for SV Mülheim-Nord since 2010, having previously played for SC Gelsenkirchen during the 2000–01 season and for SK Turm Emsdetten during the 2008–09 and 2009–10 seasons.

In addition, he is active in the Belgian Team Championship (Interclubs) for KSK Rochade Eupen-Kelmis. In the Dutch Team Championship (Meesterklasse), he played for ESGOO Enschede from 1999 to 2011 and for En Passant Bunschoten-Spakenburg since 2018.

With KSK Rochade Eupen-Kelmis, he participated four times in the European Club Cup, achieving the best individual result on board two in 2007.
