= Fred Berend =

Luxembourgian chess player (born 1965)

Personal information
- Born: March 25, 1965 (age 61)
- Spouse: Elvira Sakhatova

Chess career
- Country: Luxembourg
- Title: International Master (1994)
- Peak rating: 2425 (January 1996)

Fred Berend is a Luxembourgian chess player.

== Chess career ==
He won the Luxembourg Chess Championship in 1990, 2014, and 2017.

He has played for Luxembourg in several Chess Olympiads. His strongest result was a win against grandmaster Ehsan Ghaem Maghami in the final round of the 38th Chess Olympiad.

In October 2022, he finished in fourth place at the European Small Nations Championship with a score of 6/10.

In June 2024, he won the silver medal in the European Small Nations Individual Chess Championship, scoring 7/9.

In June 2026, he tied for second place with Daniel Gormally, Martin Mrva, Marcel Thirion, and Josep Anton Lacasa Diaz in the European Senior Chess Championship, though lost out on the medals after tiebreak scores were applied.
