= Michael Wiedenkeller =

Swedish-Luxembourgian chess player (born 1963)

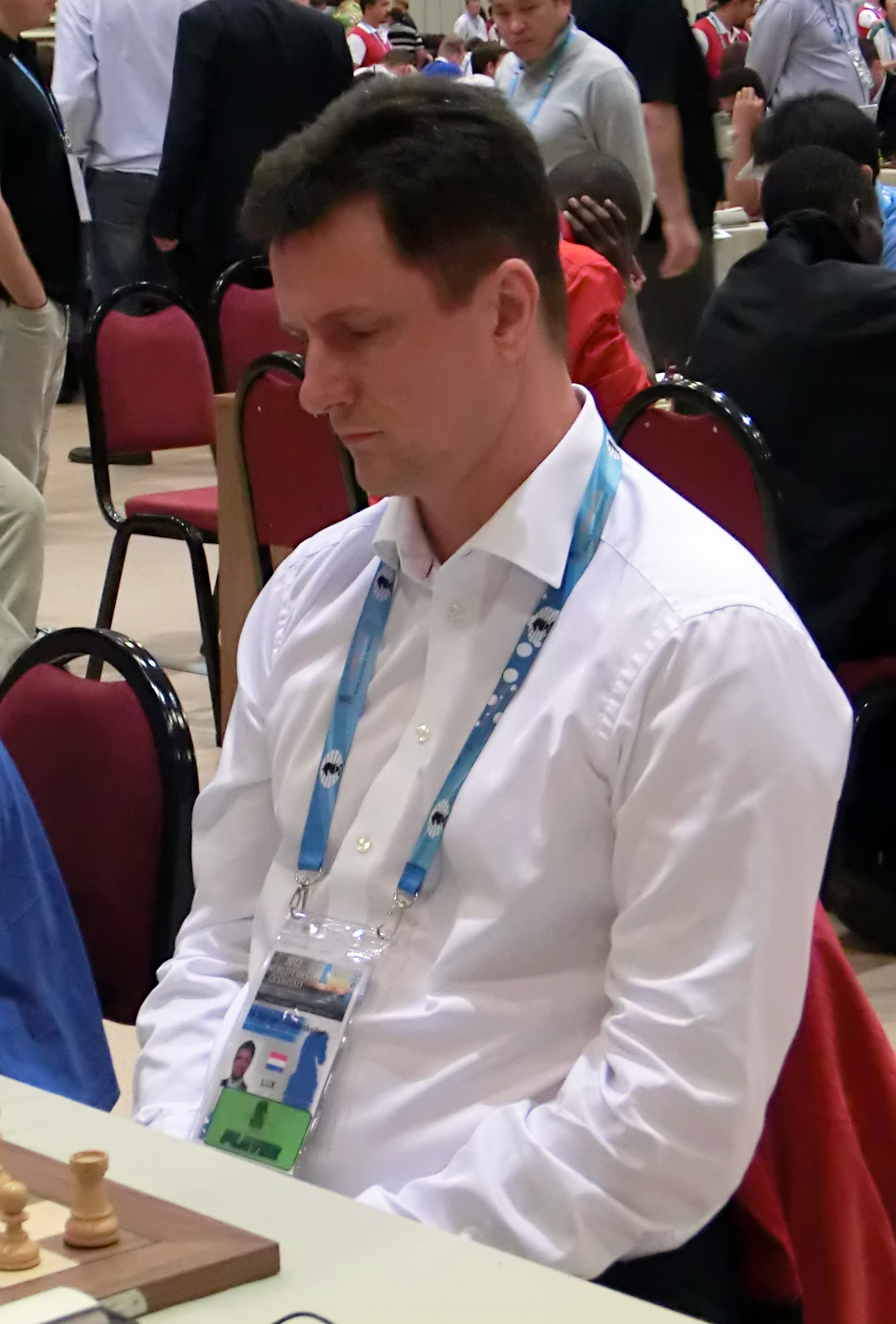
- Michael Wiedenkeller at the 40th Chess Olympiad, Istanbul 2012

Personal information
- Born: 10 January 1963 (age 63)

Chess career
- Country: Sweden (until 2010); Luxembourg (since 2010)
- Title: International Master (1984)
- Peak rating: 2481 (June 2017)

Michael Wiedenkeller (born 10 January 1963) is a Swedish and Luxembourgian chess player. He was awarded the title of International Master by FIDE in 1984.

Wiedenkeller won the 1985/86 Rilton Cup in Stockholm. In 1990, he won the Swedish Chess Championship. In 1999, he tied for second with Vlastimil Jansa in the Donne Haas Memorial in Luxembourg.

Wiedenkeller transferred from the Swedish Chess Federation to the Luxembourg Chess Federation in 2010. Before he switched federations, he had already won the Luxembourg Chess Championship off-contest in 2009 and 2010; afterwards, he won it again in 2012 and 2013.

In 2014, Wiedenkeller won the inaugural European Small Nations Individual Championship (FIDE Zone 1.10 Championship) in Larnaca, Cyprus. This achievement earned him one of the five FIDE president's nominations for the Chess World Cup 2015. He was knocked out in the first round by Levon Aronian.

In team competitions, Wiedenkeller represented Sweden in the Nordic Chess Cup in 1985; his team won the gold medal. Since he switched federation affiliation, he has represented Luxembourg in the Chess Olympiad and in the European Small Nations Team Chess Championship. In this latter event, Wiedenkeller helped the Luxembourgian team to finish first in 2011 (held in Klaksvík, Faroe Islands) and 2015 (Saint Peter Port, Guernsey).
