= Pia Cramling =

Swedish chess grandmaster (born 1963)

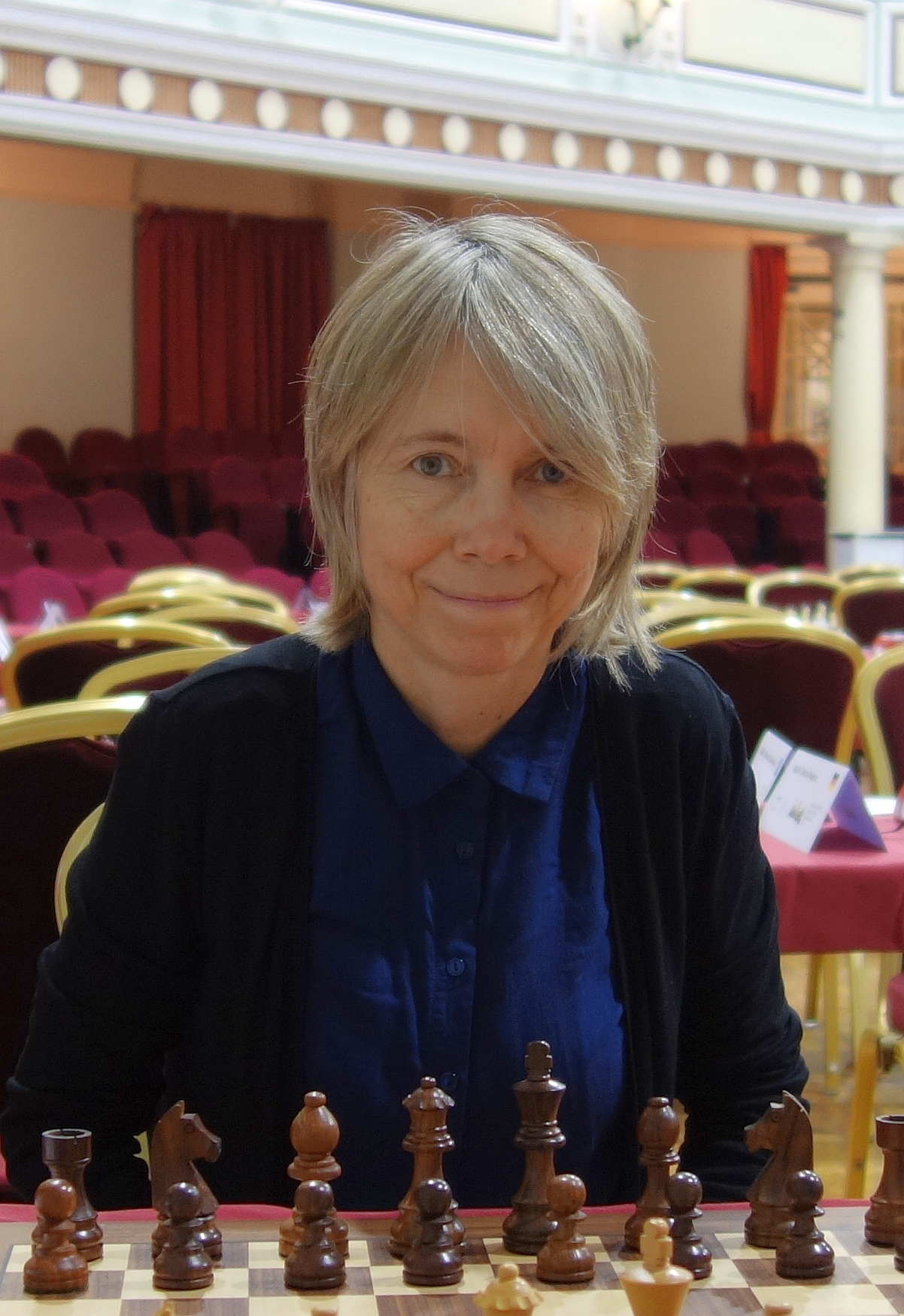
- Cramling at the 2023 Grand Swiss Tournament
- Born: Pia Ann Rosa-Della Cramling; 23 April 1963 (age 63); Stockholm, Sweden
- Spouse: Juan Manuel Bellón López (m. 1988)
- Children: Anna Cramling Bellón
- Relatives: Dan Cramling (brother)
- Chess career
- Country: Sweden
- Title: Grandmaster (1992)
- Peak rating: 2550 (October 2008)
- Peak ranking: No. 1 woman (January 1984); No. 178 (July 1992)

Pia Ann Rosa-Della Cramling (born 23 April 1963) is a Swedish chess grandmaster who in 1992 became the fifth woman to earn this title from FIDE. Since the early 1980s, she has been one of the strongest female players in the world as well as the highest-rated woman in the FIDE World Rankings on three occasions. She was the number-one-rated woman in the January 1984 rating list and the joint number-one-rated woman in the January 1983 and July 1984 lists.

== Career ==
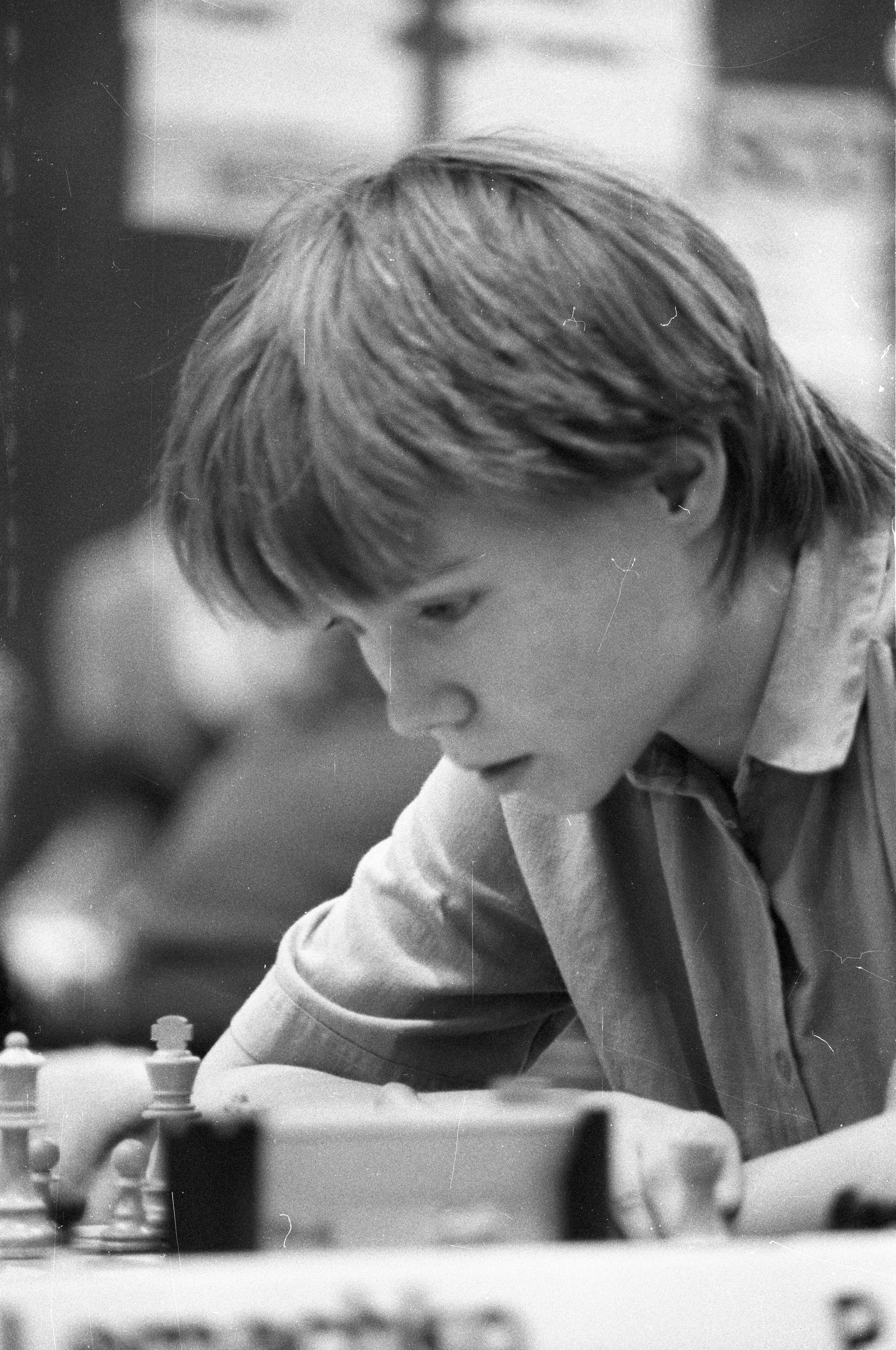
Cramling at the 25th Chess Olympiad in 1982

Cramling and Judit Polgar (who chose not to play in women's events) are the only women to have earned the grandmaster title before 2000 who have never won the Women's World Champion crown. Cramling said that the World Championship is a team effort and more prominent chess nations are able to give their players better support in important events. Nevertheless, Cramling has been in reasonably close contention for the crown on four occasions (all in different decades). In the 1986 and 1996 Candidates cycle she came in fourth and third, respectively. Since the Women's World Championship has been held with the knockout format, she reached the semifinals in 2008 and 2015. These latter results qualified her to play in the FIDE Women's Grand Prix series in 2009–11 and 2015–16, respectively. She has had greater success in Europe, where she won the Women's European Individual Chess Championship in 2003 and 2010. In 2006, she won the Accentus Ladies Tournament in Biel.

In team competitions, Cramling represented Sweden in the Chess Olympiad in both the open and women's events, European Team Chess Championship in both open and women's sections, Telechess Olympiad and Nordic Cup. In the Women's Chess Olympiad, she has won the individual gold medal as the best player on board 1 (according to the rating performance) in 1984, 1988 and 2022. In the European Club Cup for Women, Cramling has won the team gold medal in 2007, 2008, 2010, 2012, 2013 and 2016 playing for team Cercle d'Echecs Monte Carlo.

Cramling earned the International Master (IM) title in 1983 and the Grandmaster (GM) title in 1992. She defeated Raymond Keene in the tournament where she earned her first IM norm. She earned her three GM norms in Italy in 1989, in Las Palmas in 1990, and Bern in 1992.

She won the World Senior Chess Championship Women's Over 50 section in 2026.

== Personal life ==
Cramling is married to the Spanish grandmaster Juan Manuel Bellón López. The two met in Zürich, in 1984, and married four years later; since Cramling's promotion to grandmaster in 1992, they became the first chess couple who both hold the highest title in chess. Bellón and Cramling lived in Spain for a number of years, but later moved back to Sweden.

Their daughter, Anna Bellón Cramling, is a Woman FIDE Master and a chess YouTuber and Twitch streamer. At the 42nd and 44th Chess Olympiad, mother and daughter both played for Sweden, Pia being team captain on board 1 and Anna playing on board 5 and 3, respectively.

Cramling is also the younger sister of Swedish International Master Dan Cramling.
