= Jerzy Konikowski =

German chess player (born 1947)

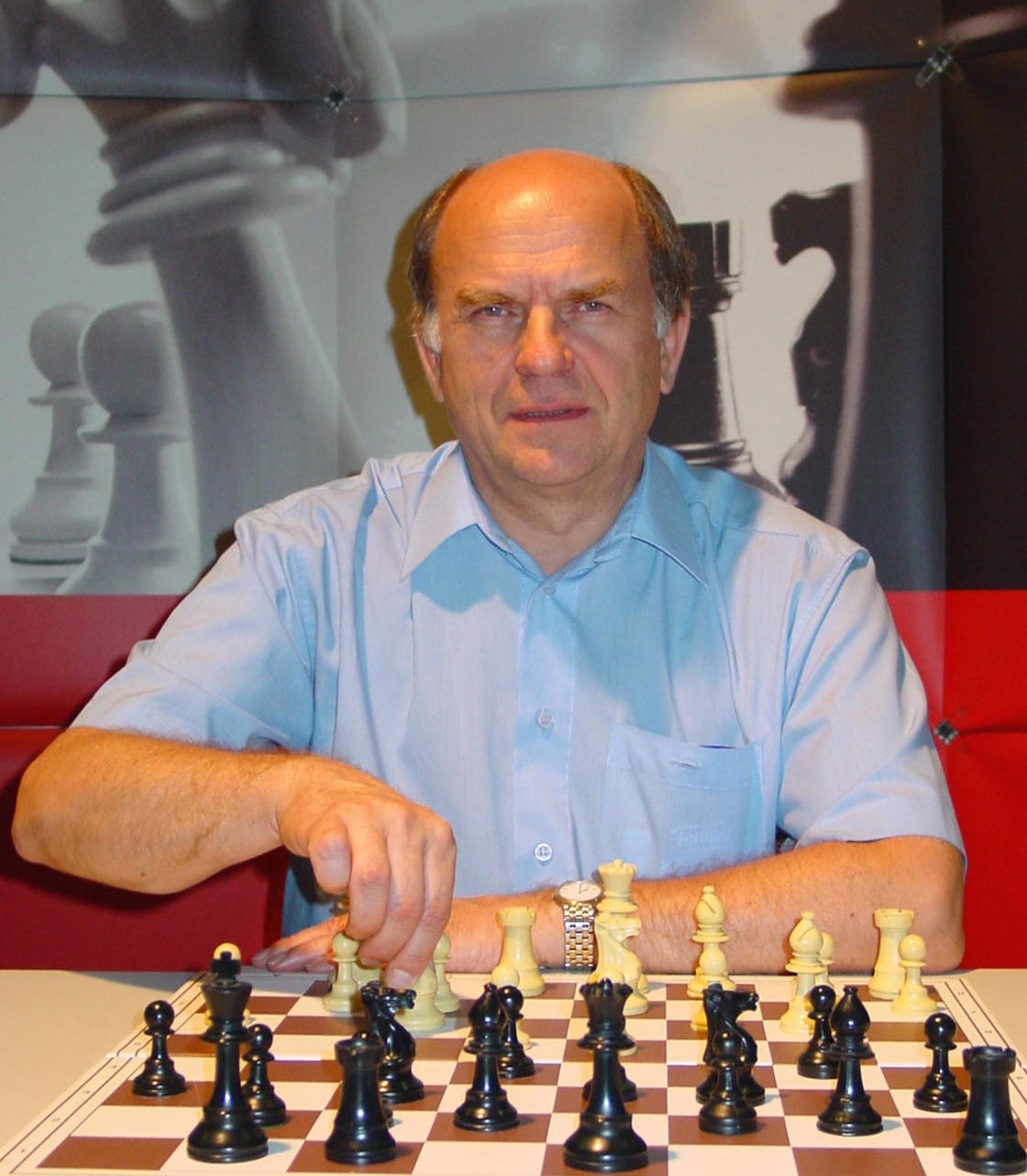

Personal information
- Born: January 24, 1947 (age 79) Bytom, Poland

Chess career
- Country: Poland (until 1981); Germany (since 1981)
- Title: FIDE Master (1983)
- Peak rating: 2400 (January 1981)

Jerzy Konikowski (born 24 January 1947, in Bytom, Poland) is a German chess player, problemist, and author.

He was a Polish national team trainer in 1978–1981 (the Polish Women's national team won bronze medal in the 9th Women's Chess Olympiad at La Valletta 1980). In 1981, he emigrated to West Germany. Since 1982, he worked at the Technical University of Dortmund as a chemist. In Germany he trained many young players, among others – Arkadij Naiditsch.

His name is attached to the Konikowski-Hardy Gambit in the Ruy Lopez, Cordel Defence (1.e4 e5 2.Nf3 Nc6 3.Bb5 Bc5 4.c3 d5!?).

Awarded the FIDE Master title in 1983.
