= David Marciano (chess player) =

French chess grandmaster (born 1969)

Personal information
- Born: July 4, 1969 (age 57) Toulouse, France

Chess career
- Country: France (until 2014); Monaco (since 2014)
- Title: Grandmaster (1998)
- FIDE rating: 2464 (July 2026)
- Peak rating: 2529 (July 1999)

David Marciano is a French chess grandmaster who plays for Monaco.

== Chess career ==
He played for France in the 1998 Chess Olympiad, posting a score of +2=4-1.

In February 2016, he finished as runner-up in the Monaco Chess Championship, losing the title to Pierre Villegas on tiebreaks. He has been inactive in chess since October 2016.

As of October 2020, he was one of two grandmasters in Monaco, alongside Igor Efimov.
