= Joseph Platz =

German-American chess player

Joseph Platz (11 April 1905, Cologne, Germany – 30 December 1981, Manchester, Connecticut, USA) was a German-American chess master.

He won the championship of Cologne in 1926, won the championship of the Rhine at Karlsruhe 1928, and won the championship of Hannover in 1931. He also tied for 4th–6th at Cologne 1924, and tied for 4th–5th at Duisburg 1929 (DSB Congress, Hauptturnier A). Platz emigrated to the United States because of Nazi policy in Germany in the 1930s.

He played a few training games with his friend, Emanuel Lasker, in New York in 1939–40. In the 1940s, he won the Bronx Championship six times. In 1948, he played in the U.S. Championship, placing 14th (Herman Steiner won). Between 1954 and 1972, he won the Western Massachusetts & Connecticut Valley Open Championship 14 times. He won the Connecticut Championship three times. He tied for the New England Championship four times. He was a USCF Master Emeritus and a medical doctor. In 1978, he wrote Chess memoirs: The chess career of a physician and Lasker pupil.

Platz is buried in Swan Point Cemetery in Providence, RI.
