= Juan Manuel Bellón López =

Spanish chess grandmaster (born 1950)

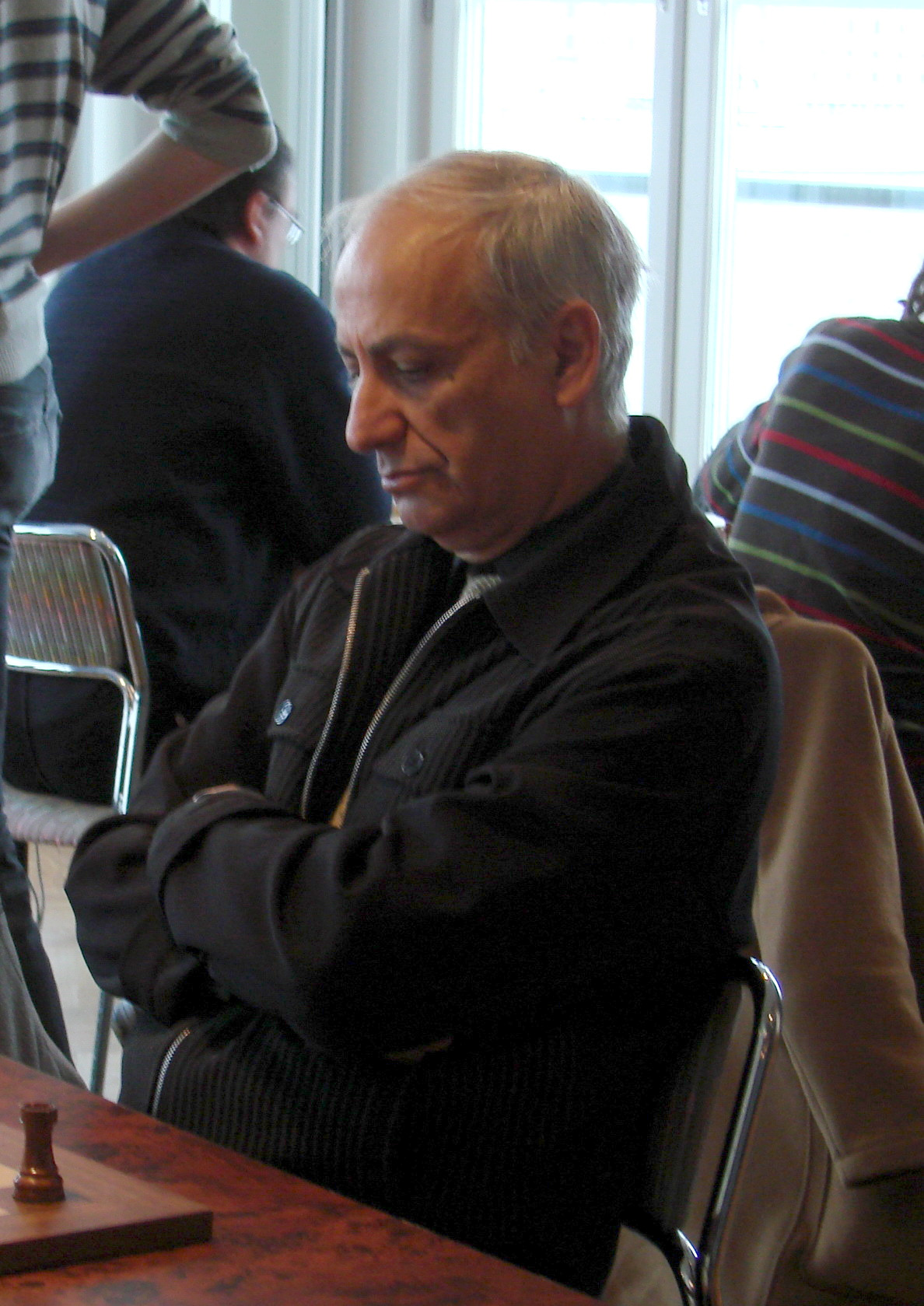
- Bellón López in 2009
- Born: 8 May 1950 (age 76); Valencia, Spain
- Spouse: Pia Cramling (m. 1988)
- Children: Anna Bellón Cramling
- Chess career
- Country: Spain (until 2017); Sweden (since 2017)
- Title: Grandmaster (1978)
- FIDE rating: 2256 (December 2025)
- Peak rating: 2510 (July 1991)

Juan Manuel Bellón López (born 8 May 1950) is a Spanish-Swedish chess player who holds the FIDE title of Grandmaster (1978). He is a five-time Spanish Chess Champion (1969, 1971, 1974, 1977, 1982), Chess Olympiad individual silver medal winner (1978), and European Team Chess Championship (1989) individual bronze medal winner.

== Biography ==
From the late 1960s to the mid-1990s, Bellón López was one of the top Spanish chess players. He won the Spanish Chess Championship five times in the years 1969, 1971, 1974, 1977 and 1982. Bellón López has participated in many international chess tournaments achieving first place or shared first place in: Torremolinos (1978), Stockholm Rilton Cup (1986/87), Barcelona (1988), Terrassa (1990), Castell-Platja d'Aro (1994), Santa Clara (1999), Varadero (2000).

Bellón López played for Spain in the Chess Olympiads:

- In 1970, at second reserve board in the 19th Chess Olympiad in Siegen (+4, =1, -4),
- In 1972, at first reserve board in the 20th Chess Olympiad in Skopje (+7, =3, -3),
- In 1974, at fourth board in the 21st Chess Olympiad in Nice (+7, =8, -3),
- In 1976, at second board in the 22nd Chess Olympiad in Haifa (+6, =1, -4),
- In 1978, at fourth board in the 23rd Chess Olympiad in Buenos Aires (+8, =4, -1) and won individual silver medal,
- In 1980, at second board in the 24th Chess Olympiad in La Valletta (+6, =3, -4),
- In 1982, at second board in the 25th Chess Olympiad in Lucerne (+3, =3, -4),
- In 1984, at second board in the 26th Chess Olympiad in Thessaloniki (+1, =4, -5),
- In 1986, at third board in the 27th Chess Olympiad in Dubai (+2, =2, -2),
- In 1988, at fourth board in the 28th Chess Olympiad in Thessaloniki (+2, =1, -4),
- In 1992, at third board in the 30th Chess Olympiad in Manila (+4, =3, -4).

Bellón López played for Spain in the European Team Chess Championships:

- In 1970, at fifth board in the 4th European Team Chess Championship in Kapfenberg (+0, =1, -5),
- In 1989, at second board in the 9th European Team Chess Championship in Haifa (+4, =3, -1) and won individual bronze medal.

Also, Bellón López three times participated in Clare Benedict Chess Cup (1970, 1974–1977) and in team competition won the gold (1970) medal.

In 1974, he was awarded the FIDE International Master (IM) title and received the FIDE Grandmaster (GM) title four years later. Bellón López is also a FIDE Developmental Instructor (2014). He is known for inventing the Bellon Gambit in 1969, which is still used by many players. One of his chess heroes was former world champion Mikhail Tal, for his creative and aggressive style of play. Juan defeated Tal in a match in 1984.

== Personal life ==
He is married to Swedish chess Grandmaster Pia Cramling, and their daughter Anna Cramling Bellón (born 2002) also plays chess, holding a Women FIDE Master (WFM) title, and is a chess-focused YouTube creator and Twitch streamer.
