= Francesco Rambaldi =

Italian chess grandmaster (born 1999)

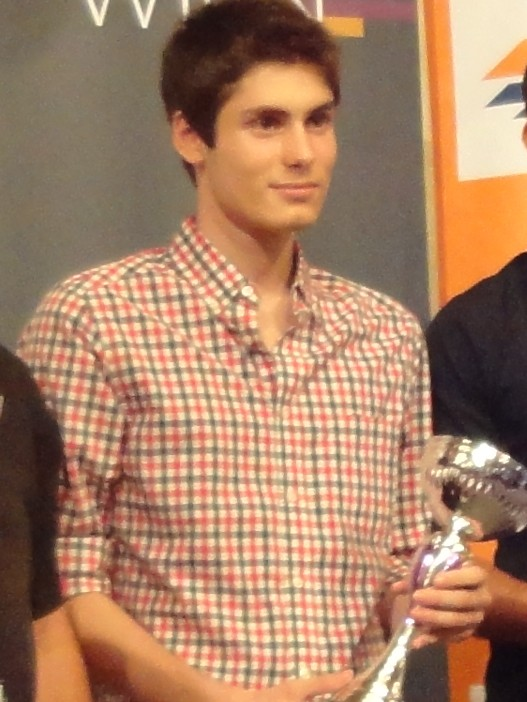
- Francesco Rambaldi, Vienna 2015

Personal information
- Born: 19 January 1999 (age 27) Milan, Italy

Chess career
- Country: Italy
- Title: Grandmaster (2015)
- FIDE rating: 2569 (July 2026)
- Peak rating: 2574 (September 2017)

Francesco Rambaldi (born 19 January 1999) is an Italian chess grandmaster. He is the No. 3 ranked Italian player, and the No. 26 ranked U21 player in the world as of April 2019.

== Chess career ==
Born in Milan, Italy, Rambaldi started playing chess at the age of 8 at a chess club in Grenoble, France. He was Champion of France and Champion of Italy in the U10 category in 2009, and Italian Champion in the U12 and U14 categories in 2011 and 2013, respectively. He completed his international master norms in November 2014 and earned the title of grandmaster in August 2015, at age 16.

In 2020, Rambaldi won the 11th annual Golden State Open.

In 2025, Rambaldi competed in the nationwide team tournament USATE held in Parsippany, New Jersey, defeating strong local players, like Henry Siegel. Playing board 1, his team performed exceptionally well although occasionally losing to strong local players like Maxwell Feng and Ayush Kumar.
