= Visakh N. R. =

Indian chess grandmaster (born 1999)

Personal information
- Born: 24 April 1999 (age 27) Nagercoil, India

Chess career
- Country: India
- Title: Grandmaster (2019)
- FIDE rating: 2529 (July 2026)
- Peak rating: 2566 (September 2022)

Visakh Narayanan Rajeshwari is an Indian chess grandmaster.

== Chess career ==
In August 2023, Visakh won the Leça Blitz Open 2023 ahead of his brother Vignesh and Harshit Raja after drawing the former and defeating the latter in tiebreaks.

In December 2023, Visakh won the 5th Roma Citta Aperta Masters section ahead of Krishna C. R. G. and Tigran Harutyunyan.

== Personal life ==
His older brother is Vignesh N. R., who is also a Grandmaster. The two became the first brothers and siblings from India to become grandmasters when Vignesh achieved the title in January 2023.
