= Arkadij Naiditsch =

Latvian chess grandmaster (born 1985)

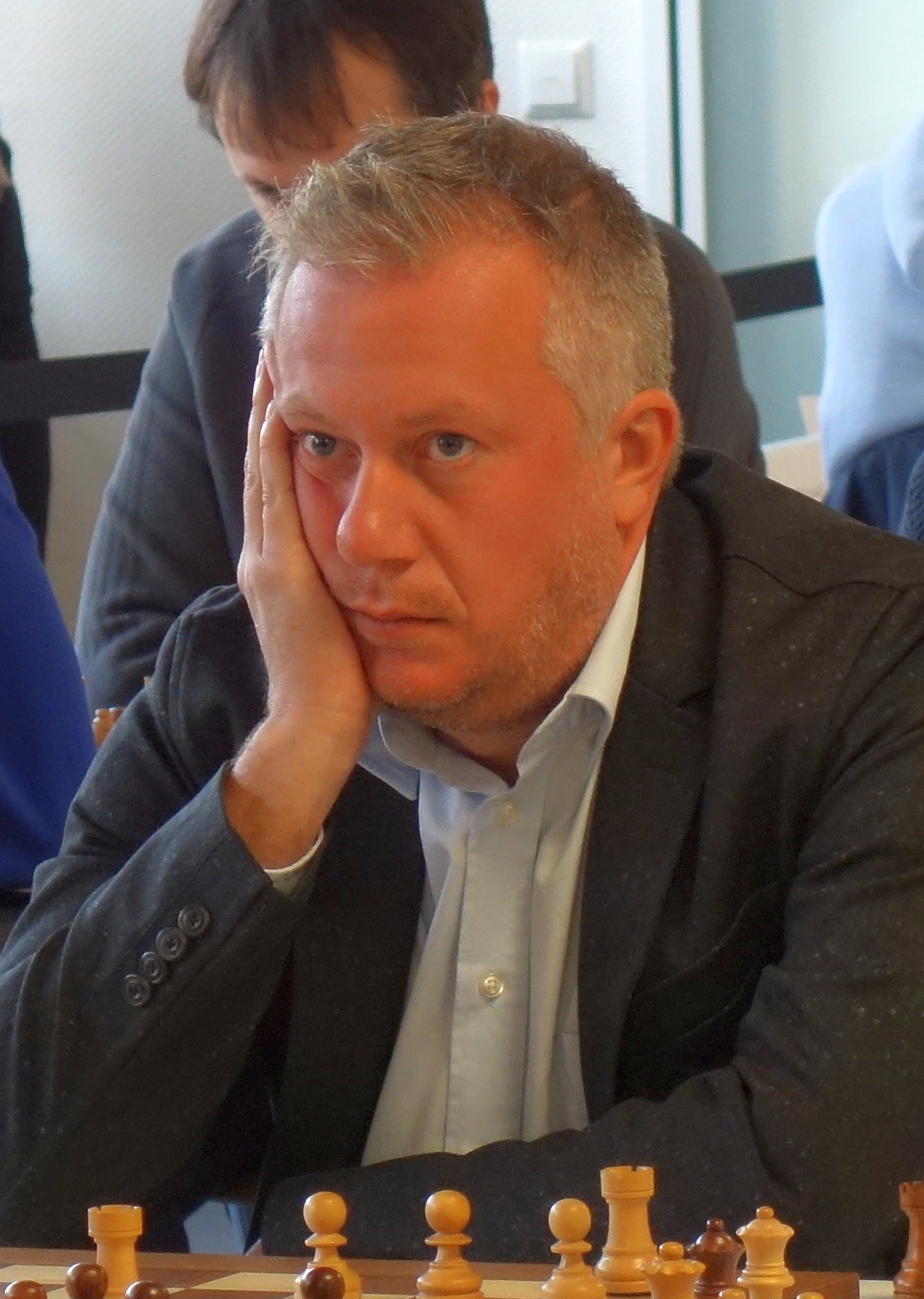
- Naiditsch in 2023

Personal information
- Born: Arkadi Mixayloviç Naydiç; 25 October 1985 (age 41) Riga, Latvian SSR
- Spouse: Yuliya Shvayger (m. 2014)

Chess career
- Country: Latvia (until 1997); Germany (1998–2015); Azerbaijan (2015–2024); Bulgaria (since 2024)
- Title: Grandmaster (1999)
- FIDE rating: 2572 (November 2026)
- Peak rating: 2737 (December 2013)
- Peak ranking: No. 18 (December 2013)

Arkadij Naiditsch (Azerbaijani: Arkadi Naydiç, Bulgarian: Аркадий Найдич; born 25 October 1985) is a Latvian chess grandmaster who currently represents Bulgaria after previously representing Latvia (until 1997), Germany (1998–2015) and Azerbaijan (2015–2024).

== Career ==
In 1995 he won the European Under-10 championship in Verdun.

Naiditsch was the winner of the Dortmund Sparkassen 2005 Tournament, ahead of higher-rated and well-known players such as Loek van Wely, Veselin Topalov, Peter Svidler, Vladimir Kramnik, Michael Adams, and Peter Leko. In 2007, he won the German national championship based in Bad Königshofen.

In 2011 he won the 15th International Neckar Open with a score of 8½/9. This achievement enabled him to cross the 2700 Elo rating mark. In the same year Naiditsch played on the top board for the German team that won the gold medal at the European Team Chess Championship in Porto Carras.

Naiditsch won the Grandmaster Group B of the Tata Steel Chess Tournament 2013 in Wijk aan Zee on tiebreak over Richárd Rapport after both finished on 9/13. This victory qualified him for the Tata Steel Group A of 2014 (later renamed 'Tata Steel Masters'). In August 2014 he won with the black pieces against World Champion Magnus Carlsen, playing first board for the German team in the 41st Chess Olympiad in Tromsø. The following month Naiditsch won the 2nd Grenke Chess Classic tournament in Baden-Baden. In December of the same year, he finished first in the 38th Zurich Christmas Open.

In January 2015 he tied for 1st–5th with Alexander Donchenko, Eduardo Iturrizaga, Matthias Dann and Miloš Pavlović in the Masters section of the Basel Chess Festival, winning the tournament on best tiebreak score. Naiditsch tied for first with Magnus Carlsen in the 3rd Grenke Chess Classic in February 2015, finishing second after a five-game blitz playoff, which ended with an armageddon game.

In July 2015 he switched to the Azerbaijani Chess Federation. On 30 December 2015 Naiditsch won for the second consecutive year the Zurich Christmas Open. Six days later, he won also the Basel Chess Festival for the second year in a row.

In 2024, he switched his federation to Bulgaria and represented the Bulgarian national team at the 45th Chess Olympiad in Budapest, Hungary.

== Personal life ==
In October 2014, Naiditsch married Ukrainian-Israeli chess player IM Yuliya Shvayger. As of 2015, he lives in Baku with his family.
