= János Aczél (royal secretary) =

János Aczél (died 1523) was a royal secretary and poet.

He was replaced from the provostry of Vác to Pressburg (Pozsony, today's Bratislava) as the secretary of Louis II. He was also the abbot of Garamszentbenedek (now Hronský Beňadik, Slovakia). He had died before he could take the position of provost in Pressburg. He wrote poems in Latin, but none of them survived.

== Sources ==
- Szinnyei József: Magyar írók élete és munkái, Arcanum, Budapest, 2000, ISBN 963-86029-9-6
