= Sam Palatnik =

Ukrainian-American chess grandmaster (born 1950)

Personal information
- Born: Semon Oleksandrovych Palatnik; March 26, 1950 (age 76) Odesa, Ukrainian SSR, Soviet Union

Chess career
- Country: Soviet Union (until 1991); Ukraine (1992–1997); United States (since 1997)
- Title: Grandmaster (1978)
- FIDE rating: 2455 (September 2026)
- Peak rating: 2520 (July 1992)

Sam Palatnik (born Semon Alexandrovich Palatnik, (Note: Ukrainian: Семен Олександрович Палатнік, romanized: Semon Oleksandrovych Palatnik) March 26, 1950) is a Ukrainian-American chess Grandmaster, born in Odesa.

== Career ==
He won four team and individual gold medals at the 20th World Student Team Chess Championship at Teesside 1974, and 21st World Student Team Championship at Caracas 1976.

Some of his tournament results include 2nd= at Kiev 1978, 3rd at Hradec Kralove 1981, 2nd= at Trnava 1987, 1st at Hradec Kralove 1988 and 1st= at Calicut 1988. He currently resides in Tennessee, USA and plays for the U.S. Chess Federation.

Palatnik was awarded the International Master (IM) title in 1977 and the GM title in 1978. He won the tournaments in Philadelphia (World Open) in 1991, Calcutta and Hradec Kralove in 1988. In the 2000s, Palatnik served as a coach for the American and Ukrainian youth teams. In the 2010s, he coached several national teams, including the Indian team.
