= Valeri Beim =

Austrian chess player and author

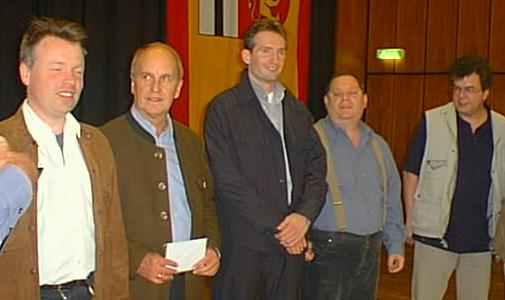
- Valeri Beim (2nd from right) in 2004

Personal information
- Native name: Вале́рий Бейм
- Born: March 17, 1950 (age 76) Odessa, Soviet Union

Chess career
- Country: Soviet Union (before 1990); Israel (1990–2001); Austria (after 2001)
- Title: Grandmaster (1994)
- FIDE rating: 2504 (November 2026)
- Peak rating: 2570 (January 1996)

Valeri Beim (Russian: Вале́рий Ильи́ч Бейм; born 17 March 1950 in Odesa), is Soviet-born, Austrian and Israeli chess Grandmaster, trainer and author.
