= Renier Castellanos Rodriguez =

Spanish chess grandmaster (born 1982)

Personal information
- Born: July 13, 1982 (age 43) Matanzas, Cuba

Chess career
- Country: Chile (until 2008); Spain (since 2008)
- Title: Grandmaster (2024)
- FIDE rating: 2462 (July 2026)
- Peak rating: 2529 (December 2012)

Renier Castellanos Rodriguez is a Spanish chess grandmaster.

== Chess career ==
In October 2013, he won the 9th Ciudad de Zaragoza tournament alongside top Spanish grandmaster Francisco Vallejo Pons.

In June 2024, he tied for second place with Ashwath R in the 13th Salento Open Masters, scoring 6.5/9. He was ranked in third place after tiebreak scores.

He achieved the Grandmaster title in 2024, after earning his norms at the:

- XIII Torneo Internacional “Ciudad de Albacete” in March 2005
- 3º International Livigno Chess Open in September 2012
- LXXXII Campeonato de España Individual Absoluto in October 2017
- III Open Internacional Chess Menorca A in April 2024
