= Gergely Aczel =

Hungarian chess grandmaster (born 1991)

Gergely Aczél
Personal information
- Born: February 27, 1991 (age 35) Budapest, Hungary

Chess career
- Country: Hungary
- Title: Grandmaster (2018)
- FIDE rating: 2429 (July 2026)
- Peak rating: 2573 (November 2017)

Gergely Aczél (born 1991) is a Hungarian chess Grandmaster.

== Chess career ==
He was awarded his International Master title in 2013 and his Grandmaster title in 2018. He finished second in the 2018 Hungarian Chess Championship.
