= FIDE World Chess Championships =

International chess competition series

FIDE World Chess Championships are events organised by the International Chess Federation to determine World Chess Champions across different formats and categories based on age and gender.

The following are the reigning World Championships and the reigning World Champions respectively.

Individual championships
Title	Format	Category		Reigning Champion	Title held since	Rating and World Rankings (November 2026)														
Title	Format	Category		Reigning Champion	Title held since	Standard					Rapid					Blitz				
Title	Format	Gender	Age group	Reigning Champion	Title held since	Rating	Rank				Rating	Rank				Rating	Rank			
Title	Format	Gender	Age group	Reigning Champion	Title held since	Rating	Open	Women	Jr	Girls	Rating	Open	Women	Jr	Girls	Rating	Open	Women	Jr	Girls
World Chess Championship	Classical	Open	Open	(India) GM Gukesh Dommaraju	12 December 2024	2710	26	-	2	-	2686	21	-	1	-	2659	38	-	2	-
Women's World Chess Championship	Classical	Women	Open	(China) GM Ju Wenjun	18 May 2018	2553	290	3	-	-	2488	438	4	-	-	2445	678	3	-	-
World Junior Chess Championship	Classical	Open	Junior*	(India) GM Pranav Venkatesh	7 March 2025	2679	43	-	3	-	2592	124	-	4	-	2582	126	-	12	-
World Junior Chess Championship (Girls)	Classical	Women	Junior*	(Russia) WGM Anna Shukhman	7 March 2025	2421	1344	33	203	7	2369	1417	28	198	2	2335	1686	39	284	6
World Rapid Chess Championship	Rapid	Open	Open	(Norway) GM Magnus Carlsen	28 December 2025	2823	1	-	-	-	2803	1	-	-	-	2860	1	-	-	-
Women's World Rapid Chess Championship	Rapid	Women	Open	(FIDE) GM Aleksandra Goryachkina	28 December 2025	2540	346	5	-	-	2492	428	3	-	-	2469	533	2	-	-
World Junior Rapid Chess Championship	Rapid	Open	Junior*	(Uzbekistan) GM Khumoyun Begmuratov	4 November 2026	2517	455	-	46	-	2433	758	-	60	-	2429	803	-	105	-
World Junior Rapid Chess Championship (Girls)	Rapid	Women	Junior*	(Netherlands) IM Eline Roebers	4 November 2026	2429	1675	32	185	6	2366	1470	30	212	3	2428	815	6	110	1
World Blitz Chess Championship	Blitz	Open	Open	(Norway) GM Magnus Carlsen	28 December 2025	2823	1	-	-	-	2803	1	-	-	-	2860	1	-	-	-
Women's World Blitz Chess Championship	Blitz	Women	Open	(Kazakhstan) GM Bibisara Assaubayeva	28 December 2025	2532	384	7	-	-	2441	701	7	-	-	2424	836	7	-	-
World Junior Blitz Chess Championship	Blitz	Open	Junior*	(India) GM Pranav Venkatesh	6 November 2026	2679	43	-	3	-	2592	124	-	4	-	2582	126	-	12	-
World Junior Blitz Chess Championship (Girls)	Blitz	Women	Junior*	(FIDE) WGM Valeria Kleymenova	6 November 2026	2314	3641	137	681	27	2191	5189	204	1040	34	2213	4105	142	864	42
Freestyle Chess World Championship	Freestyle/Chess960 (Rapid)	Open	Open	(Norway) GM Magnus Carlsen	15 February 2026	2823	1	-	-	-	2803	1	-	-	-	2860	1	-	-	-
Women's Freestyle Chess World Championship	Freestyle/Chess960 (Rapid)	Women	Open	Vacant																
Total Chess World Championship	Combined (Fast Classical, Rapid and Blitz)	Open		Vacant																

Team championships
Title	Category	Format	Reigning Champions	
Title	Category	Format	Team	Players
World Rapid Team Championship		Rapid	Dragon Chilling (Captain: (China) GM Ni Hua)	(China) GM Ding Liren (China) GM Wei Yi (China) GM Yu Yangyi (China) GM Lu Shanglei (China) GM Bai Jinshi (China) GM Ju Wenjun (Women) (China) GM Lei Tingjie (Women) (China) Zihao Wang (Recreational) Xie XiaoYang (Recreational)
World Blitz Team Championship		Blitz	Dragon Chilling (Captain: (China) GM Ni Hua)	(China) GM Ding Liren (China) GM Wei Yi (China) GM Yu Yangyi (China) GM Lu Shanglei (China) GM Bai Jinshi (China) GM Ju Wenjun (Women) (China) GM Lei Tingjie (Women) (China) Zihao Wang (Recreational) Xie XiaoYang (Recreational)
World University Team Championship		Classical	Ural State Mining University (Captain: (FIDE) IM Artem Pingin)	(FIDE) GM Arseniy Nesterov (FIDE) GM Rudik Makarian (FIDE) GM Sergey Lobanov (FIDE) IM Leya Garifullina (Woman)

== Classical World Championships ==
=== World Chess Championship ===
The World Chess Championship, also known as the Classical World Championship or simply the World Championship, is a biennial event played to determine the world champion in chess. The current world champion is GM Gukesh Dommaraju, who defeated the previous champion, GM Ding Liren, in the 2024 World Chess Championship.

The World Chess Champion is determined by a cycle of events known as the World Championship Cycle. The events in the World Championship Cycle change biennially. The top scorers of these events and other qualifiers compete in a double round robin tournament known as Candidates Tournament. The winner of the candidates tournament is titled World Champion Challenger and challenges the World Chess Champion for his title in a 14 round classical event, which is the World Chess Championship.

The current World Championship Cycle (2024-2026) includes the following paths for the Candidates Tournament 2026 and their respective qualifiers.

Qualification method	Player	Age	Rating	World ranking
Qualification method	Player	(March 2026)		
2024 FIDE Circuit winner	(United States) Fabiano Caruana	33	2795	3
Top two finishers of the 2025 FIDE Grand Swiss	(Netherlands) Anish Giri (winner)	31	2753	8
Top two finishers of the 2025 FIDE Grand Swiss	(Germany) Matthias Blübaum (runner-up)	28	2698	32
Top three finishers of the 2025 FIDE World Cup	(Uzbekistan) Javokhir Sindarov (winner)	20	2745	12
Top three finishers of the 2025 FIDE World Cup	(China) Wei Yi (runner-up)	26	2754	7
Top three finishers of the 2025 FIDE World Cup	(FIDE) Andrey Esipenko (third place)	24	2698	33
2025 FIDE Circuit winner	(India) R Praggnanandhaa	20	2741	13
Highest average rating (Note: Provided the player has played at least 40 games rated for the February 2025 through January 2026 standard rating lists, including at least 15 in any of the six consecutive lists from August 2025 to January 2026.) (Aug 2025 – Jan 2026)	(United States) Hikaru Nakamura	38	2810	2

Standings of the 2026 Candidates Tournament
Rank	Player	Score	SB	Wins	Qualification	JS		AG		FC		WY		HN		MB		RP		AE	
1	Javokhir Sindarov (UZB)	10 / 14	64.75	6	Advanced to title match			½	½	1	½	½	1	½	1	½	½	1	1	1	½
2	Anish Giri (NED)	8.5 / 14	56.5	4		½	½			½	1	½	½	½	½	½	1	1	0	½	1
3	Fabiano Caruana (USA)	7.5 / 14	48	4		½	0	0	½			1	½	1	0	1	½	½	½	½	1
4	Wei Yi (CHN)	7 / 14	44.75	2		0	½	½	½	½	0			½	½	½	½	½	½	1	1
5	Hikaru Nakamura (USA)	6.5 / 14	44.5	1		0	½	½	½	1	0	½	½			½	½	½	½	½	½
6	Matthias Blübaum (GER)	6 / 14	42	0		½	½	0	½	½	0	½	½	½	½			½	½	½	½
7	R Praggnanandhaa (IND)	6 / 14	40	1		0	0	1	0	½	½	½	½	½	½	½	½			½	½
8	Andrey Esipenko (FIDE)	4.5 / 14	31.5	0		½	0	0	½	0	½	0	0	½	½	½	½	½	½		

Source: FIDE
Rules for classification: For first place: tie-break games. For subsequent spots: (1) results in tie-break games for first place, if any; (2) Sonneborn–Berger score (SB); (3) total number of wins; (4) head-to-head score among tied players; (5) drawing of lots.
Note: Numbers in the crosstable in a white background indicate the result playing the respective opponent with the white pieces (black pieces if on a black background). This does not give information which of the two games was played in the first half of the tournament, and which in the second.

=== Women's World Chess Championship ===
The Women's World Chess Championship began in 1927 to encourage female participation in chess. The format of the cycle is the same as the World Chess Championship except that the events determining the Women's Candidates Tournament are women-only tournaments with a much weaker field by TAR (Tournament Average Rating).

Vera Menchik was the first and the longest reigning Women's World Champion, winning the first 8 Championships and reigning for 17 years before her death. The end of her reign paved the way for the Soviet Union's 4-decade-long domination in the tournament, which continued until the collapse of Soviet Union. Since the 1990s, Chinese players have constantly dominated Women's Chess, winning 16 of the 21 World Championships from 1991 to the present. The current champion, GM Ju Wenjun, has reigned for 8 years, winning 5 consecutive championships. As per the current Women's World Championship Cycle, below are the qualified players for the Women's Candidates Tournament 2026 and the results of the tournament.

Qualification method	Player	Age	Rating	World ranking
Qualification method	Player	(March 2026)		
The top two finishers in the FIDE Women's Grand Prix 2024–25	(China) Zhu Jiner (winner)	23	2578	2
The top two finishers in the FIDE Women's Grand Prix 2024–25	(FIDE) Aleksandra Goryachkina (runner-up)	27	2534	7
The top three finishers in the Women's Chess World Cup 2025	(India) Divya Deshmukh (winner)	20	2497	12
The top three finishers in the Women's Chess World Cup 2025	(India) ~~Koneru Humpy~~ (runner-up, withdrew)	39	2535	5
The top three finishers in the Women's Chess World Cup 2025	(China) Tan Zhongyi (third place)	34	2535	6
The top two finishers in the FIDE Women's Grand Swiss Tournament 2025	(India) Vaishali Rameshbabu (winner)	24	2470	18
The top two finishers in the FIDE Women's Grand Swiss Tournament 2025	(FIDE) Kateryna Lagno (runner-up)	36	2508	10
Highest place in the FIDE Women's Events 2024–25 not already qualified (Note: Koneru Humpy finished first in the 2024–2025 FIDE Women's Events circuit, but had already qualified for the Candidates through a second place finish at the Women's Chess World Cup 2025. As a result, the qualifying spot was awarded to the highest finisher of the FIDE Women's Events circuit who had not already qualified for the event (Bibisara Assaubayeva). Upon Koneru's withdrawal from the event on March 22, 2026, her spot went to the next highest finisher (Anna Muzychuk).)	(Kazakhstan) Bibisara Assaubayeva	22	2516	9
Highest place in the FIDE Women's Events 2024–25 not already qualified	(Ukraine) Anna Muzychuk (Replacement for Koneru)	36	2522	8

Standings of the 2026 Women's Candidates Tournament
Rank	Player	Score	SB	Wins	Qualification	VR		BA		ZJ		AG		AM		KL		DD		TZ	
1	Vaishali Rameshbabu (IND)	8.5 / 14	55.75	5	Advanced to title match			½	½	0	0	½	1	½	½	1	1	1	½	1	½
2	Bibisara Assaubayeva (KAZ)	8 / 14	56.25	4		½	½			1	1	½	½	1	½	1	0	0	½	½	½
3	Zhu Jiner (CHN)	7.5 / 14	50.5	5		1	1	0	0			0	½	0	½	1	½	½	1	½	1
4	Aleksandra Goryachkina (FIDE)	7.5 / 14	50.25	3		0	½	½	½	½	1			½	½	½	0	½	1	1	½
5	Anna Muzychuk (UKR)	7 / 14	49.25	2		½	½	½	0	½	1	½	½			1	½	0	½	½	½
6	Kateryna Lagno (FIDE)	6.5 / 14	43	4		0	0	1	0	½	0	1	½	½	0			1	½	½	1
7	Divya Deshmukh (IND)	5.5 / 14	40.25	2		½	0	½	1	0	½	0	½	½	1	½	0			0	½
8	Tan Zhongyi (CHN)	5.5 / 14	38.25	1		½	0	½	½	0	½	½	0	½	½	0	½	½	1		

Source: FIDE
Rules for classification: For first place: tie-break games. For subsequent spots: (1) results in tie-break games for first place, if any; (2) Sonneborn–Berger score (SB); (3) total number of wins; (4) head-to-head score among tied players; (5) drawing of lots.
Note: Numbers in the crosstable in a white background indicate the result playing the respective opponent with the white pieces (black pieces if on a black background). This does not give information which of the two games was played in the first half of the tournament, and which in the second.

=== World Junior Chess Championship (Open and Women) ===
The World Junior Chess Championship is a relatively smaller scale event with a very small cycle. This championship, unlike most other world championships, is an 11-round annual Swiss-system tournament. The World Junior Chess Championship and World Junior Chess Championship (Girls) cycle include the following players provided that they satisfy the age criteria. FIDE considers a chess player to be a junior until the end of the year if the player was under 20 years old on 1 January of that year.

- Top 3 players of the last World Junior Championship (Open/Women respectively).
- The Continental Junior Champions (Open/Women respectively) of the year preceding this edition.
- Top 6 Junior (4 for girls) players from FIDE rating list as on 1 January of the year of Championship.
- World Youth U18 and U16 champions (Open/Women respectively) of the year preceding this edition.
- All players nominated by any national chess federation.

Pranav Venkatesh and Anna Shukhman are the current World Junior Champions in the open and girls categories, respectively.

== World Rapid & Blitz Chess Championships ==
World Rapid and Blitz championships are significantly different from their classical counterparts, which is much older and difficult to participate in. World Rapid Championship, World Blitz Championship, Women's World Rapid Championship and Women's World Blitz Championship, all are held together since 2012 and World Junior Rapid and Blitz Championships (both open and girls) are held together since their inception in 2014.

=== Open ===
Eligible participants include

- players with FIDE rating 2550 or higher in any recent rating list (Standard, Rapid or Blitz).
- national champions.
- other players nominated by FIDE President and/or organisers.

GM Magnus Carlsen is the current World Rapid Champion (6th time in 2025) and also the current World Blitz Champion (9th time in 2025 including one shared title in 2024).

=== Women ===
Eligible participants include

- players with FIDE rating 2250 or higher in any recent rating list (Standard, Rapid or Blitz).
- national women's champions.
- other players nominated by FIDE President and/or organisers.

Aleksandra Goryachkina is the current Women's World Rapid Champion, whereas Bibisara Assaubayeva is the current Women's World Blitz Champion (3rd time in 2025).

=== Junior ===
Any number of players with any rating can be sent for the event by member federations. GM Khumoyun Begmuratov and IM Eline Roebers are the current World Junior Rapid Champions (open and girls respectively) who won the World Jr Rapid Championships 2026, whereas GM Pranav V and WGM Valeria Kleymenova are the current World Blitz Champions (open and girls respectively) who won the World Jr Blitz Championships 2026.

== Total Chess World Championship ==
FIDE and Norway Chess (in partnership) announced Total Chess World Championship Tour, a world championship based on combination of fast classical, rapid and blitz format, on 15 October 2025 which will start as a pilot event with Total Chess World Championship 2026 before the full tour starting in 2027. This championship has no women only or juniors only equivalent, though the qualification paths include women only tournaments.

== Freestyle Chess World Championship ==
Freestyle Chess World Championship is the successor of FIDE World Fischer Random Chess Championship and of the Freestyle Chess Grand Slam Tour. Magnus Carlsen is the current Freestyle World Chess Champion. The event will include a women's section from 2027.
