= FIDE Women's Grand Prix 2026–27 =

Women's chess tournament series

FIDE Women's Grand Prix Series 2026–27
Tournament information
- Sport: Chess
- Location: TBD
- Dates: TBD–TBD
- Administrator: FIDE
- Format: Series of round-robin tournaments
- Defending champions: Zhu Jiner

The 2026–2027 edition of the FIDE Women's Grand Prix will be a series of six chess tournaments exclusively for women which determines players to play in the Women's Candidates Tournament 2028. The winner of the Candidates Tournament will play the reigning world champion in the Women's World Chess Championship 2028.

This edition will be the eighth cycle of the tournament series. Each of 20 players will have to participate in three out of six tournaments, each of which is a ten-player round robin event. The tournaments will be held between 2026 and 2027.

== Players ==
20 players will qualify for the Grand Prix. The twenty players to qualify for the WGP are determined according to the following criteria:

- A. 2 spots – FIDE Women's World Championship Match 2025 participants: GM Ju Wenjun and GM Tan Zhongyi
- B. 2 spots – FIDE Women's Grand Prix Series 2024–25: GM Zhu Jiner and GM Aleksandra Goryachkina.
- C. 3 spots – FIDE Women's World Cup 2025: GM Divya Deshmukh, GM Koneru Humpy, GM Lei Tingjie.
- D. 3 spots – FIDE Women's Grand Swiss 2025: three best players according to the final standings (but not below 4th place), excluding those who have qualified for WGP Series 2026-27 via paths 3.1.a-c. The unallocated spot(s), if any, will be awarded according to the procedure described in Article 3.1.e.
- E. 1 spot – FIDE Women's Events 2024–25: GM Anna Muzychuk.
- F. 3 spots – Standard Rating in the April 2026 FIDE Rating List: four players with the highest rating, excluding those who have qualified for WGP Series via paths 3.1.a-e. Only players who played at least 30 games rated in the FIDE standard rating lists from May 2025 to April 2026 are eligible. If two or more players have equal ratings, the drawing of lots will be used to determine the qualifiers.
- G. 6 spots – Players nominated by organisers of WGP tournaments: each of the six WGP tournament organisers will nominate any player non-qualified via paths 3.1.a-f of his/her choice upon consultation with FIDE president.

Invitee	Qualifying method	Rating (April 2026)
(China) Ju Wenjun	Women's World Championship Match 2025	2559
(China) Tan Zhongyi	Women's World Championship Match 2025	2535
(China) Zhu Jiner	Women's Grand Prix Series 2024–25	2554
(FIDE) Aleksandra Goryachkina (Note: Russian players' flags are displayed as the FIDE flag because FIDE banned Russian flags from FIDE-rated events in response to the Russian invasion of Ukraine.)	Women's Grand Prix Series 2024–25	2534
(India) Divya Deshmukh	Women's World Cup 2025	2510
(India) Koneru Humpy	Women's World Cup 2025	2535
(China) Lei Tingjie	Women's World Cup 2025	2566
(India) Vaishali Rameshbabu	Women's Grand Swiss 2025	2470
(FIDE) Kateryna Lagno	Women's Grand Swiss 2025	2508
(Kazakhstan) Bibisara Assaubayeva	Women's Grand Swiss 2025	2516
(Ukraine) Anna Muzychuk	Women's Events 2024-25	2522
(FIDE) Polina Shuvalova	Rating	2502
(Switzerland) Alexandra Kosteniuk	Rating	2487
(United States) Carissa Yip	Rating	2482
TBD	Organiser's nominee	TBD
TBD	Organiser's nominee	TBD
TBD	Organiser's nominee	TBD
TBD	Organiser's nominee	TBD
TBD	Organiser's nominee	TBD
TBD	Organiser's nominee	TBD

== Prizes ==
The tour points and prize money will be awarded as follows.

Place	Tour Points	Event prize money	Overall prize money
1st	130	€18,000	€30,000
2nd	105	€13,000	€22,000
3rd	85	€10,500	€16,000
4th	70	€8,500	€12,000
5th	60	€7,000	€10,000
6th	50	€6,000	€8,000
7th	40	€5,000	€7,000
8th	30	€4,500	€6,000
9th	20	€4,000	€5,000
10th	10	€3,500	€4,000

== Grand Prix Standings ==
Invitee	Event 1	Event 2	Event 3	Event 4	Event 5	Event 6	Total	Circuit Points
(China) Ju Wenjun								
(China) Tan Zhongyi								
(China) Zhu Jiner								
(FIDE) Aleksandra Goryachkina								
(India) Divya Deshmukh								
(India) Koneru Humpy								
(China) Lei Tingjie								
(India) Vaishali Rameshbabu								
(FIDE) Kateryna Lagno								
(Kazakhstan) Bibisara Assaubayeva								
(Ukraine) Anna Muzychuk								
(FIDE) Polina Shuvalova								
(Switzerland) Alexandra Kosteniuk								
(United States) Carissa Yip								
TBD								
TBD								
TBD								
TBD								
TBD								
TBD								
