= Women's World Chess Championship 2027 =

Upcoming chess match between Ju Wenjun and Vaishali Rameshbabu

- 2027
	Defending champion	Challenger
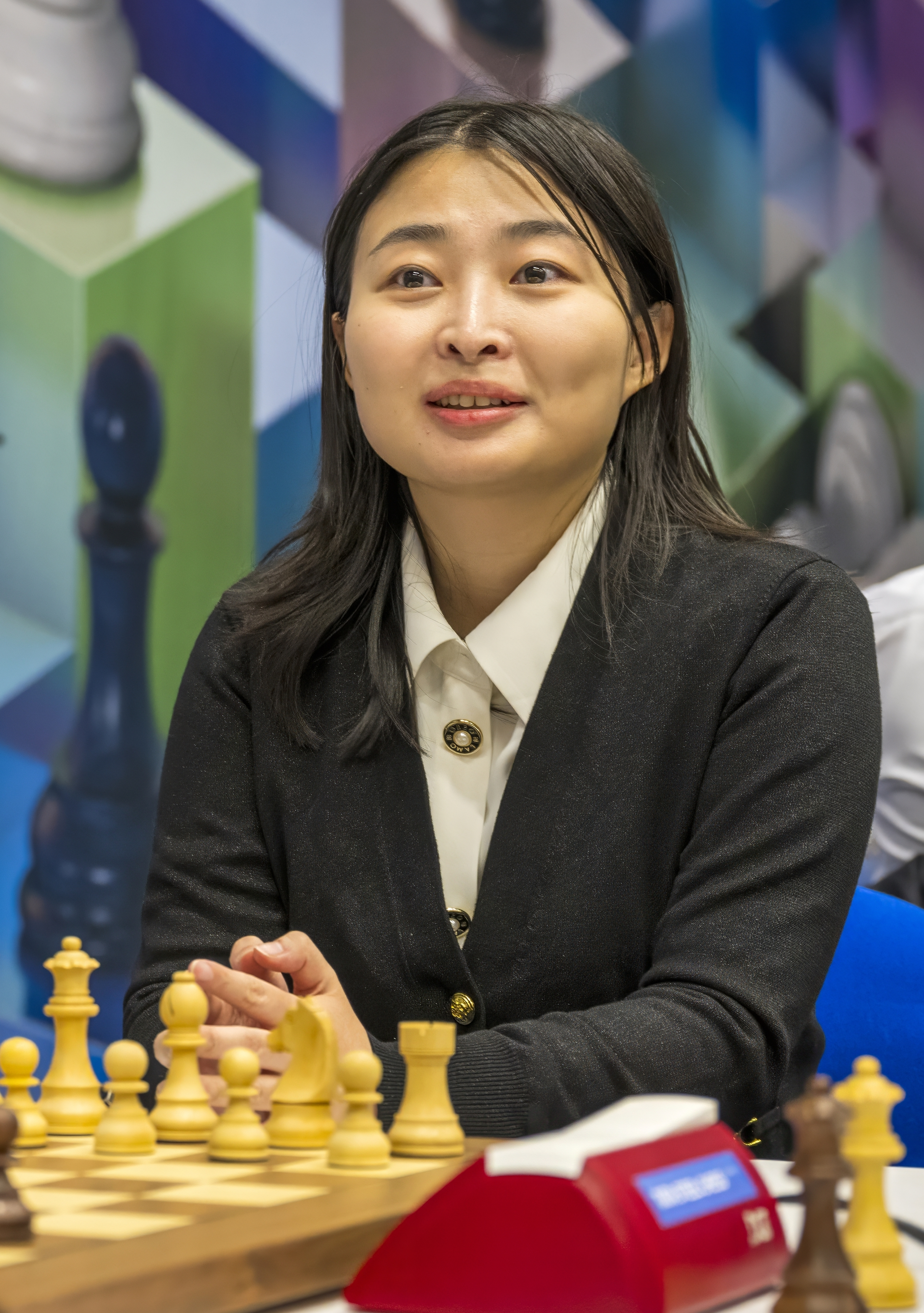
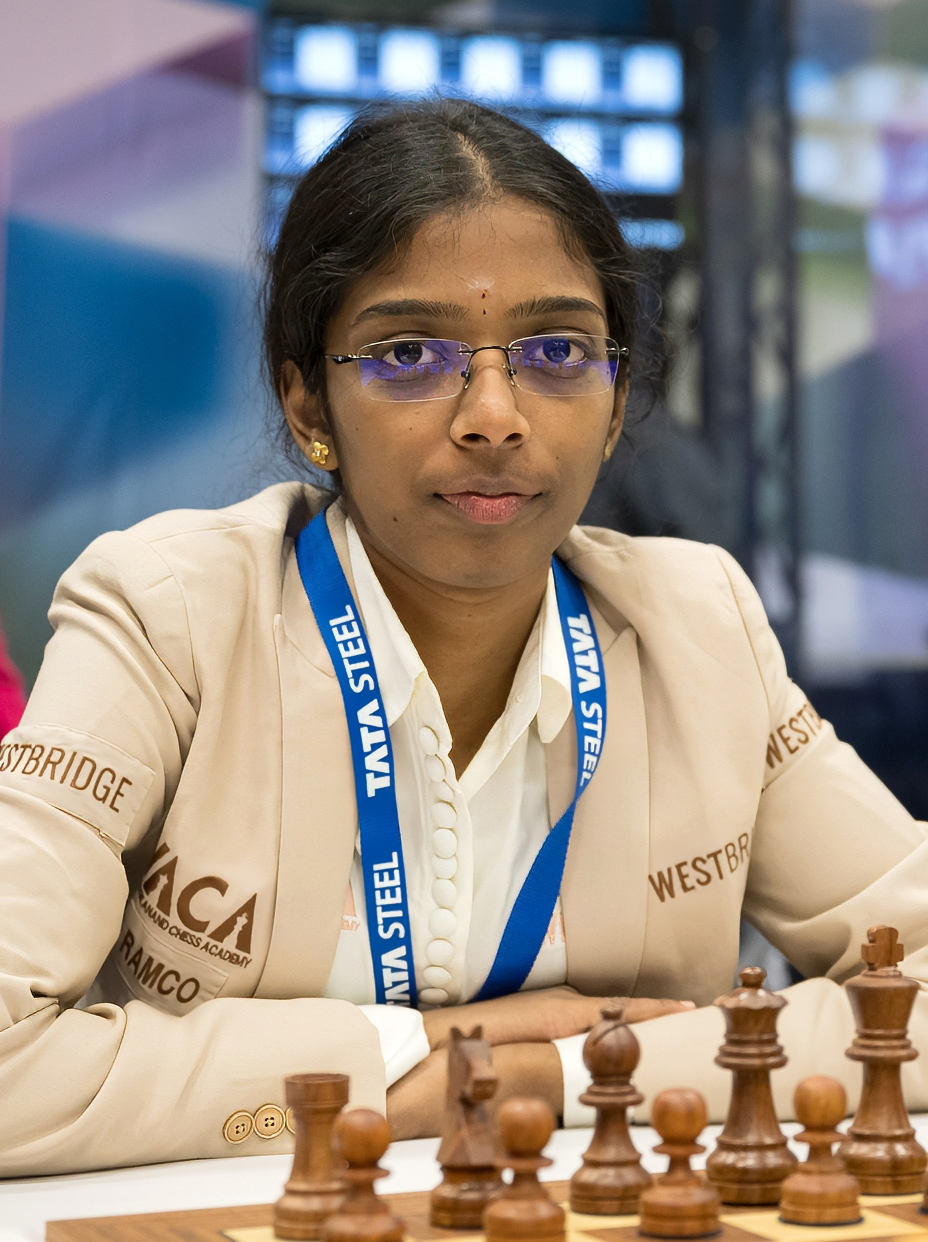
	(China) Ju Wenjun	(India) Vaishali Rameshbabu
	Born 31 January 1991; 35 years old	Born 21 June 2001; 25 years old
	Winner of the Women's World Chess Championship 2025	Winner of the Women's Candidates Tournament 2026

The Women's World Chess Championship 2027 is an upcoming chess match which will determine the new Women's World Chess Champion. It will be played between the defending champion Ju Wenjun, the winner of the Women's World Chess Championship 2025, and Vaishali Rameshbabu, the winner of Women's Candidates Tournament 2026. The dates and host city are yet to be decided.

== Candidates Tournament ==
The challenger, Vaishali Rameshbabu, qualified by winning the Women's Candidates Tournament 2026, which was held at the Cap Saint Georges Hotel and Resort in Pegeia, Cyprus, between 28 March and 16 April.

The eight players to qualify to the Women's Candidates Tournament were:

Qualification method	Player	Age	Rating	World ranking
Qualification method	Player	(March 2026)		
The top two finishers in the FIDE Women's Grand Prix 2024–25	(China) Zhu Jiner (winner)	23	2578	2
The top two finishers in the FIDE Women's Grand Prix 2024–25	(FIDE) Aleksandra Goryachkina (runner-up)	27	2534	7
The top three finishers in the Women's Chess World Cup 2025	(India) Divya Deshmukh (winner)	20	2497	12
The top three finishers in the Women's Chess World Cup 2025	(India) ~~Koneru Humpy~~ (runner-up) (Withdrew) (Note: Humpy withdrew a week before the tournament began, citing safety concerns in Cyprus due to the 2026 Iran war.)	39	2535	5
The top three finishers in the Women's Chess World Cup 2025	(China) Tan Zhongyi (third place)	34	2535	6
The top two finishers in the FIDE Women's Grand Swiss Tournament 2025	(India) Vaishali Rameshbabu (winner)	24	2470	18
The top two finishers in the FIDE Women's Grand Swiss Tournament 2025	(FIDE) Kateryna Lagno (runner-up)	36	2508	10
Highest place in the FIDE Women's Events 2024–25 not already qualified (Note: Koneru Humpy finished first in the 2024–2025 FIDE Women's Events circuit, but had already qualified for the Candidates through a second place finish at the Women's Chess World Cup 2025. As a result, the qualifying spot was awarded to the highest finisher of the FIDE Women's Events circuit who had not already qualified for the event (Bibisara Assaubayeva). Upon Koneru's withdrawal from the event on March 22, 2026, her spot went to the next highest finisher (Anna Muzychuk).)	(Kazakhstan) Bibisara Assaubayeva	22	2516	9
Highest place in the FIDE Women's Events 2024–25 not already qualified	(Ukraine) Anna Muzychuk (Replacement for Koneru)	36	2522	8

=== Results ===
Standings of the 2026 Women's Candidates Tournament
Rank	Player	Score	SB	Wins	Qualification	VR		BA		ZJ		AG		AM		KL		DD		TZ	
1	Vaishali Rameshbabu (IND)	8.5 / 14	55.75	5	Advanced to title match			½	½	0	0	½	1	½	½	1	1	1	½	1	½
2	Bibisara Assaubayeva (KAZ)	8 / 14	56.25	4		½	½			1	1	½	½	1	½	1	0	0	½	½	½
3	Zhu Jiner (CHN)	7.5 / 14	50.5	5		1	1	0	0			0	½	0	½	1	½	½	1	½	1
4	Aleksandra Goryachkina (FIDE)	7.5 / 14	50.25	3		0	½	½	½	½	1			½	½	½	0	½	1	1	½
5	Anna Muzychuk (UKR)	7 / 14	49.25	2		½	½	½	0	½	1	½	½			1	½	0	½	½	½
6	Kateryna Lagno (FIDE)	6.5 / 14	43	4		0	0	1	0	½	0	1	½	½	0			1	½	½	1
7	Divya Deshmukh (IND)	5.5 / 14	40.25	2		½	0	½	1	0	½	0	½	½	1	½	0			0	½
8	Tan Zhongyi (CHN)	5.5 / 14	38.25	1		½	0	½	½	0	½	½	0	½	½	0	½	½	1		

Source: FIDE
Rules for classification: For first place: tie-break games. For subsequent spots: (1) results in tie-break games for first place, if any; (2) Sonneborn–Berger score (SB); (3) total number of wins; (4) head-to-head score among tied players; (5) drawing of lots.
Note: Numbers in the crosstable in a white background indicate the result playing the respective opponent with the white pieces (black pieces if on a black background). This does not give information which of the two games was played in the first half of the tournament, and which in the second.

== See also ==
- World Chess Championship 2026
