= FIDE Women's Grand Prix 2024–25 =

Women's chess tournament series

FIDE Women's Grand Prix Series 2024–25
Tournament information
- Sport: Chess
- Location: (Georgia (country)) Tbilisi; (Kazakhstan) Shymkent; (Monaco) Monte Carlo; (Cyprus) Nicosia; (India) Pune; (Austria) Großlobming
- Dates: 14 August 2024–15 May 2025
- Administrator: FIDE
- Format: Series of round-robin tournaments

Final positions
- Champion: Zhu Jiner
- Runner-up: Aleksandra Goryachkina

The 2024–2025 edition of the FIDE Women's Grand Prix was a series of six chess tournaments exclusively for women which determined two players to play in the Women's Candidates Tournament 2026. The winner of the Candidates Tournament will play the reigning world champion in the Women's World Chess Championship 2026.

The 2024–2025 edition was the seventh cycle of the tournament series. Each of 16 players had to participate in three out of six tournaments, and every tournament was a ten-player round robin event. The tournaments were held between 2024 and 2025.

Zhu Jiner and Aleksandra Goryachkina were the top two finishers of the series, and qualified to play in the Women's Candidates Tournament 2026.

== Players ==
20 players qualified for the Grand Prix. The twenty players to qualify for the WGP were determined according to the following criteria:

- A. 2 spots – FIDE Women's World Championship Match 2023 participants: GM Ju Wenjun and GM Lei Tingjie
- B. 2 spots – FIDE Women's Grand Prix Series 2022–23: GM Kateryna Lagno and GM Aleksandra Goryachkina.
- C. 3 spots – FIDE Women's World Cup 2023: IM Nurgyul Salimova, GM Anna Muzychuk, GM Tan Zhongyi.
- D. 3 spots – FIDE Women's Grand Swiss 2023: three best players according to the final standings (but not below 4th place), excluding those who had qualified for WGP Series 2024-25 via paths 3.1.a-c. The unallocated spot(s), if any, were awarded according to the procedure described in Article 3.1.e.
- E. 4 spots – Standard Rating in the April 2024 FIDE Rating List: four players with the highest rating, excluding those who had qualified for WGP Series via paths 3.1.a-d. Only players who played at least 30 games rated in the FIDE standard rating lists from May 2023 to April 2024 were eligible. If two or more players had equal ratings, the drawing of lots was used to determine the qualifiers.
- F. 6 spots – Players nominated by organisers of WGP tournaments: each of the six WGP tournament organisers nominated any player non-qualified via paths 3.1.a-e of his/her choice upon consultation with FIDE president.

Replacement players are stylized in italics.

| Invitee | Qualifying method | Rating (April 2024) |
|---|---|---|
| (China) ~~Ju Wenjun~~ | Women's World Championship Match 2023 | 2559 |
| (China) ~~Lei Tingjie~~ | Women's World Championship Match 2023 | 2550 |
| (FIDE) Kateryna Lagno (Note: Russian players' flags are displayed as the FIDE flag because FIDE banned Russian and Belarusian flags from FIDE-rated events in response to the Russian invasion of Ukraine.) | Women's Grand Prix Series 2022–23 | 2542 |
| (FIDE) Aleksandra Goryachkina | Women's Grand Prix Series 2022–23 | 2553 |
| (Bulgaria) Nurgyul Salimova | Women's World Cup | 2432 |
| (Ukraine) Anna Muzychuk | Women's World Cup | 2520 |
| (China) Tan Zhongyi | Women's World Cup | 2521 |
| (India) Vaishali Rameshbabu | Women's Grand Swiss | 2475 |
| (Mongolia) Batkhuyag Munguntuul | Women's Grand Swiss | 2381 |
| (India) Koneru Humpy | Rating | 2546 |
| (Ukraine) Mariya Muzychuk | Rating | 2510 |
| (Georgia (country)) Nana Dzagnidze | Rating | 2506 |
| (India) Harika Dronavalli | Rating | 2503 |
| (Switzerland) Alexandra Kosteniuk | Rating | 2501 |
| (Spain) Sarasadat Khademalsharieh (Note: Replacement for Ju) | Rating (replacement) | 2490 |
| (China) Zhu Jiner (Note: Replacement for Lei) | Rating (replacement) | 2463 |
| (Georgia (country)) Lela Javakhishvili | Organiser's nominee | 2447 |
| (Kazakhstan) Bibisara Assaubayeva | Organiser's nominee | 2481 |
| (Germany) Elisabeth Pähtz | Organiser's nominee | 2457 |
| (Greece) Stavroula Tsolakidou | Organiser's nominee | 2424 |
| (India) Divya Deshmukh | Organiser's nominee | 2427 |
| (Austria) ~~Regina Pokorna~~ | Organiser's nominee | 2302 |
| (Austria) Olga Badelka (Note: Replacement for Pokorna in 4th and 6th legs) | Organiser's nominee (replacement) | 2374 |
| (Poland) Alina Kashlinskaya (Note: Replacement for Pokorna in 1st leg (Tbilisi) and for Khadelmalsharieh in 5th leg (Pune)) | Replacement | 2468 |
| (Georgia (country)) Salome Melia (Note: Replacement for Javakhishvili in 5th leg (Pune)) | Replacement | 2322 |
| (FIDE) Polina Shuvalova (Note: Replacement for Lagno in 5th leg (Pune)) | Replacement | 2440 |

== Schedule ==
| Dates | Host city | Winner | Runner-up | Third place |
|---|---|---|---|---|
| 14–25 August, 2024 | Tbilisi | Alina Kashlinskaya | Bibisara Assaubayeva | Stavroula Tsolakidou |
| 29 October–9 November, 2024 | Shymkent | (FIDE) Aleksandra Goryachkina | (China) Tan Zhongyi | Bibisara Assaubayeva |
| 17–28 February, 2025 | Monte Carlo | (FIDE) Aleksandra Goryachkina | (India) Humpy Koneru | (Mongolia) Batkhuyag Munguntuul |
| 14–25 March, 2025 | Nicosia | (Ukraine) Anna Muzychuk | (China) Zhu Jiner | (India) Harika Dronavalli |
| 14–25 April, 2025 | Pune | (India) Humpy Koneru | (China) Zhu Jiner | (India) Divya Deshmukh |
| 5–16 May, 2025 | Großlobming | (Ukraine) Anna Muzychuk | (China) Zhu Jiner | (China) Tan Zhongyi |

== Prizes ==
The tour points and prize money were awarded as follows:

| Place | Tour Points | Overall prize money | Event prize money |
|---|---|---|---|
| 1st | 130 | €30,000 | €18,000 |
| 2nd | 105 | €22,000 | €13,000 |
| 3rd | 85 | €16,000 | €10,500 |
| 4th | 70 | €12,000 | €8,500 |
| 5th | 60 | €10,000 | €7,000 |
| 6th | 50 | €8,000 | €6,000 |
| 7th | 40 | €7,000 | €5,000 |
| 8th | 30 | €6,000 | €4,500 |
| 9th | 20 | €5,000 | €4,000 |
| 10th | 10 | €4,000 | €3,500 |

- Tour points and prize money were shared equally between tied players.

== Tournaments ==
=== Georgia (Stage 1) ===
The first stage of the FIDE Women's Grand Prix 2024–2025 was held in Tbilisi, Georgia from 14–25 August, 2024. Alina Kashlinskaya was the winner of the tournament.

FIDE Women's Grand Prix Stage 1, 14–25 August, 2024, Tbilisi, Georgia, Category X (2482.4)
| | Player | Rating | 1 | 2 | 3 | 4 | 5 | 6 | 7 | 8 | 9 | 10 | Points | BPG (Note: Number of games played with black) | SB | Grand Prix Points | Prize money |
|---|---|---|---|---|---|---|---|---|---|---|---|---|---|---|---|---|---|
| 1 | IM Alina Kashlinskaya (POL) | 2474 | | ½ | ½ | ½ | ½ | 1 | 1 | ½ | 1 | ½ | 6 | | | 130 | €18,000 |
| 2 | IM Bibisara Assaubayeva (KAZ) | 2472 | ½ | | ½ | ½ | ½ | ½ | ½ | 1 | ½ | 1 | 5½ | | | 105 | €13,000 |
| 3 | IM Stavroula Tsolakidou (GRE) | 2428 | ½ | ½ | | ½ | ½ | ½ | 1 | ½ | ½ | ½ | 5 | 4 | 22.00 | 71.67 | €8,667 |
| 4 (Note: The third tiebreak was number of wins. Nana had 2 while Anna had 1, so Nana got 4th and Anna 5th.) | GM Nana Dzagnidze (GEO) | 2505 | ½ | ½ | ½ | ½ | | ½ | 0 | 1 | ½ | 1 | 5 | 4 | 21.25 | 71.67 | €8,667 |
| 5 | GM Anna Muzychuk (UKR) | 2521 | ½ | ½ | ½ | | ½ | ½ | ½ | ½ | ½ | 1 | 5 | 4 | 21.25 | 71.67 | €8,667 |
| 6 | GM Mariya Muzychuk (UKR) | 2508 | 0 | ½ | ½ | ½ | ½ | | 1 | ½ | ½ | ½ | 4½ | | | 50 | €6,000 |
| 7 (Note: The third tiebreak was number of wins. Vaishali had 2 while Alexandra had 1, so Vaishali got 7th and Alexandra 8th.) | GM Vaishali Rameshbabu (IND) | 2488 | 0 | ½ | 0 | ½ | 1 | 0 | | ½ | ½ | 1 | 4 | 5 | 16.50 | 35 | €4,750 |
| 8 | GM Alexandra Kosteniuk (SUI) | 2488 | ½ | 0 | ½ | ½ | 0 | ½ | ½ | | ½ | 1 | 4 | 5 | 16.50 | 35 | €4,750 |
| 9 | IM Lela Javakhishvili (GEO) | 2451 | 0 | ½ | ½ | ½ | ½ | ½ | ½ | ½ | | 0 | 3½ | | | 20 | €4,000 |
| 10 | IM Sarasadat Khademalsharieh (ESP) | 2489 | ½ | 0 | ½ | 0 | 0 | ½ | 0 | 0 | 1 | | 2½ | | | 10 | €3,000 |

=== Kazakhstan (Stage 2) ===
The second stage of the FIDE Women's Grand Prix 2024–2025 was held in Shymkent, Kazakhstan from 29 October–9 November, 2024. Aleksandra Goryachkina was the winner of the tournament.

FIDE Women's Grand Prix Stage 2, 29 October–9 November, 2024, Shymkent, Kazakhstan, Category X (2476.4)
| | Player | Rating | 1 | 2 | 3 | 4 | 5 | 6 | 7 | 8 | 9 | 10 | Points | BPG | SB | Grand Prix Points | Prize money |
|---|---|---|---|---|---|---|---|---|---|---|---|---|---|---|---|---|---|
| 1 | GM Aleksandra Goryachkina (FIDE) | 2528 | | 1 | ½ | 1 | ½ | 1 | ½ | ½ | 1 | 1 | 7 | | | 130 | €18,000 |
| 2 | GM Tan Zhongyi (CHN) | 2551 | 0 | | ½ | 1 | ½ | ½ | 1 | 1 | 1 | 1 | 6½ | | | 105 | €13,000 |
| 3 | IM Bibisara Assaubayeva (KAZ) | 2488 | ½ | ½ | | ½ | 1 | ½ | 0 | 1 | ½ | ½ | 5 | 5 | 22.00 | 77.5 | €9,500 |
| 4 | IM Stavroula Tsolakidou (GRE) | 2445 | 0 | 0 | ½ | | 1 | ½ | ½ | ½ | 1 | 1 | 5 | 5 | 18.00 | 77.5 | €9,500 |
| 5 | GM Koneru Humpy (IND) | 2530 | ½ | ½ | 0 | 0 | | ½ | ½ | 1 | ½ | 1 | 4½ | 5 | | 55 | €6,500 |
| 6 | IM Divya Deshmukh (IND) | 2493 | 0 | ½ | ½ | ½ | ½ | | ½ | ½ | ½ | 1 | 4½ | 4 | | 55 | €6,500 |
| 7 | GM Kateryna Lagno (FIDE) | 2527 | ½ | 0 | 1 | ½ | ½ | ½ | | ½ | ½ | 0 | 4 | | | 40 | €5,000 |
| 8 | IM Nurgyul Salimova (BUL) | 2402 | ½ | 0 | 0 | ½ | 0 | ½ | ½ | | ½ | 1 | 3½ | | | 30 | €4,500 |
| 9 | GM Elisabeth Pähtz (GER) | 2456 | 0 | 0 | ½ | 0 | ½ | ½ | ½ | ½ | | 0 | 2½ | 5 | | 15 | €3,750 |
| 10 | IM Batkhuyag Munguntuul (MGL) | 2344 | 0 | 0 | ½ | 0 | 0 | 0 | 1 | 0 | 1 | | 2½ | 4 | | 15 | €3,750 |

=== Monaco (Stage 3) ===
The third stage of the FIDE Women's Grand Prix 2024–2025 was held in Monte Carlo, Monaco from 18–28 February, 2025. Aleksandra Goryachkina was the winner of the tournament.

FIDE Women's Grand Prix Stage 3, 18–28 February, 2025, Monte Carlo, Monaco, Category X (2482.7)
| | Player | Rating | 1 | 2 | 3 | 4 | 5 | 6 | 7 | 8 | 9 | 10 | Points | BPG | SB | Grand Prix Points | Prize money |
|---|---|---|---|---|---|---|---|---|---|---|---|---|---|---|---|---|---|
| 1 | GM Aleksandra Goryachkina (FIDE) | 2546 | | 1 | ½ | ½ | 0 | ½ | 1 | ½ | 1 | ½ | 5½ | 5 | 23.50 | 106.67 | €13,833 |
| 2 | GM Koneru Humpy (IND) | 2523 | 0 | | ½ | ½ | ½ | ½ | 1 | 1 | 1 | ½ | 5½ | 5 | 22.50 | 106.67 | €13,833 |
| 3 | IM Batkhuyag Munguntuul (MGL) | 2331 | ½ | ½ | | ½ | ½ | 1 | ½ | ½ | ½ | 1 | 5½ | 4 | | 106.67 | €13,833 |
| 4 | GM Tan Zhongyi (CHN) | 2561 | ½ | ½ | ½ | | ½ | 0 | 1 | ½ | 1 | ½ | 5 | 5 | | 65 | €7,750 |
| 5 | GM Kateryna Lagno (FIDE) | 2515 | 1 | ½ | ½ | ½ | | ½ | 0 | ½ | ½ | 1 | 5 | 4 | | 65 | €7,750 |
| 6 | GM Alexandra Kosteniuk (SUI) | 2484 | ½ | ½ | 0 | 1 | ½ | | ½ | 0 | ½ | 1 | 4½ | | | 50 | €6,000 |
| 7 | IM Sarasadat Khademalsharieh (ESP) | 2458 | 0 | 0 | ½ | 0 | 1 | ½ | | 1 | ½ | ½ | 4 | 5 | | 35 | €4,750 |
| 8 | GM Harika Dronavalli (IND) | 2489 | ½ | 0 | ½ | ½ | ½ | 1 | 0 | | ½ | ½ | 4 | 4 | | 35 | €4,750 |
| 9 | IM Bibisara Assaubayeva (KAZ) | 2492 | 0 | 0 | ½ | 0 | ½ | ½ | ½ | ½ | | ½ | 3 | 4 | 13.50 | 15 | €3,750 |
| 10 | GM Elisabeth Pähtz (GER) | 2428 | ½ | ½ | 0 | ½ | 0 | 0 | ½ | ½ | ½ | | 3 | 4 | 13.00 | 15 | €3,750 |

=== Cyprus (Stage 4) ===
The fourth stage of the FIDE Women's Grand Prix 2024–2025 was held in Nicosia, Cyprus from 14–25 March, 2025. Anna Muzychuk was the winner of the tournament.

FIDE Women's Grand Prix Stage 4, 14–25 March, 2025, Nicosia, Cyprus, Category X (2483.2)
| | Player | Rating | 1 | 2 | 3 | 4 | 5 | 6 | 7 | 8 | 9 | 10 | Points | BPG | SB | Grand Prix Points |
|---|---|---|---|---|---|---|---|---|---|---|---|---|---|---|---|---|
| 1 | GM Anna Muzychuk (UKR) | 2516 | | ½ | ½ | ½ | ½ | 1 | 1 | 0 | 1 | 1 | 6 | 4 | 25.00 | 117.5 |
| 2 | GM Zhu Jiner (CHN) | 2514 | ½ | | ½ | ½ | ½ | ½ | 1 | 1 | ½ | 1 | 6 | 4 | 24.50 | 117.5 |
| 3 | GM Harika Dronavalli (IND) | 2483 | ½ | ½ | | ½ | ½ | 1 | ½ | 1 | ½ | 0 | 5 | 5 | 22.75 | 71.67 |
| 4 | GM Mariya Muzychuk (UKR) | 2490 | ½ | ½ | ½ | | ½ | ½ | ½ | ½ | ½ | 1 | 5 | 5 | 21.25 | 71.67 |
| 5 | GM Alexandra Goryachkina (FIDE) | 2548 | ½ | ½ | ½ | ½ | | ½ | ½ | ½ | 1 | ½ | 5 | 4 | 21.75 | 71.67 |
| 6 | GM Nana Dzagnidze (GEO) | 2513 | 0 | ½ | 0 | ½ | ½ | | ½ | ½ | 1 | 1 | 4½ | 5 | 17.75 | 50 |
| 7 | IM Divya Deshmukh (IND) | 2470 | 0 | 0 | ½ | ½ | ½ | ½ | | 1 | ½ | ½ | 4 | 4 | 16.25 | 40 |
| 8 | IM Olga Badelka (AUT) | 2429 | 1 | 0 | 0 | ½ | ½ | ½ | 0 | | ½ | ½ | 3½ | 5 | 16.25 | 25 |
| 9 | IM Stavroula Tsolakidou (GRE) | 2445 | 0 | ½ | ½ | ½ | 0 | 0 | ½ | ½ | | 1 | 3½ | 4 | 14.25 | 25 |
| 10 | GM Elisabeth Pähtz (GER) | 2424 | 0 | 0 | 1 | 0 | ½ | 0 | ½ | ½ | 0 | | 2½ | 5 | 11.25 | 10 |

=== India (Stage 5) ===
The fifth stage of the FIDE Women's Grand Prix 2024–2025 was held in Pune, India from 14–25 April, 2025. Koneru Humpy was the winner of the tournament.

FIDE Women's Grand Prix Stage 5, 14–25 April, 2025, Pune, India, Category X (2482.7)
| | Player | Rating | 1 | 2 | 3 | 4 | 5 | 6 | 7 | 8 | 9 | 10 | Points | BPG | SB | Grand Prix Points |
|---|---|---|---|---|---|---|---|---|---|---|---|---|---|---|---|---|
| 1 | GM Koneru Humpy (IND) | 2528 | | 1 | 1 | ½ | 1 | ½ | 1 | ½ | ½ | 1 | 7 | 5 | 30.75 | 117.5 |
| 2 | GM Zhu Jiner (CHN) | 2525 | 0 | | 1 | 1 | 1 | 1 | ½ | ½ | 1 | 1 | 7 | 4 | 27.75 | 117.5 |
| 3 | IM Divya Deshmukh (IND) | 2460 | 0 | 0 | | ½ | ½ | 1 | 1 | 1 | ½ | 1 | 5½ | 5 | 19.5 | 85 |
| 4 | GM Harika Dronavalli (IND) | 2488 | ½ | 0 | ½ | | ½ | ½ | 1 | ½ | ½ | ½ | 4½ | 5 | 18.5 | 65 |
| 5 | IM Polina Shuvalova (FIDE) | 2500 | 0 | 0 | ½ | ½ | | ½ | ½ | 1 | 1 | ½ | 4½ | 5 | 16.25 | 65 |
| 6 | GM Vaishali Rameshbabu (IND) | 2484 | ½ | 0 | 0 | ½ | ½ | | ½ | ½ | ½ | 1 | 4 | 4 | 15.75 | 50 |
| 7 | IM Nurgyul Salimova (BUL) | 2402 | 0 | ½ | 0 | 0 | ½ | ½ | | ½ | ½ | 1 | 3½ | 4 | 13.75 | 40 |
| 8 | IM Salome Melia (GEO) | 2293 | ½ | ½ | 0 | ½ | 0 | ½ | ½ | | ½ | 0 | 3 | 5 | 14.5 | 20 |
| 9 | IM Alina Kashlinskaya (POL) | 2496 | ½ | 0 | ½ | ½ | 0 | ½ | ½ | ½ | | 0 | 3 | 4 | 13.75 | 20 |
| 10 | IM Batkhuyag Munguntuul (MGL) | 2361 | 0 | 0 | 0 | ½ | ½ | 0 | 0 | 1 | 1 | | 3 | 4 | 10.5 | 20 |

=== Austria (Stage 6) ===
The sixth and final stage of the FIDE Women's Grand Prix 2024–2025 was held in Großlobming, Austria from 6–15 May, 2025. Anna Muzychuk was the winner of the tournament.

FIDE Women's Grand Prix Stage 6, 6–15 May, 2025, Großlobming, Austria, Category X (2481.8)
| | Player | Rating | 1 | 2 | 3 | 4 | 5 | 6 | 7 | 8 | 9 | 10 | Points | BPG | SB | Grand Prix Points |
|---|---|---|---|---|---|---|---|---|---|---|---|---|---|---|---|---|
| 1 | GM Anna Muzychuk (UKR) | 2529 | | 1 | ½ | ½ | ½ | ½ | 1 | ½ | 1 | ½ | 6 | 5 | 26.25 | 117.5 |
| 2 | GM Zhu Jiner (CHN) | 2541 | 0 | | 0 | 1 | 1 | 1 | ½ | 1 | ½ | 1 | 6 | 4 | 23.75 | 117.5 |
| 3 | GM Tan Zhongyi (CHN) | 2536 | ½ | 1 | | ½ | 0 | ½ | 0 | 1 | 1 | 1 | 5½ | 5 | 23.25 | 85 |
| 4 | GM Vaishali Rameshbabu (IND) | 2475 | ½ | 0 | ½ | | ½ | ½ | 0 | 1 | 1 | 1 | 5 | 4 | 19.75 | 70 |
| 5 | GM Nana Dzagnidze (GEO) | 2509 | ½ | 0 | 1 | ½ | | ½ | ½ | ½ | 0 | 1 | 4½ | 5 | 19.25 | 55 |
| 6 | GM Mariya Muzychuk (UKR) | 2494 | ½ | 0 | ½ | ½ | ½ | | 1 | 0 | 1 | ½ | 4½ | 4 | 19 | 55 |
| 7 | GM Alexandra Kosteniuk (SUI) | 2479 | 0 | ½ | 1 | 1 | ½ | 0 | | 1 | 0 | 0 | 4 | 5 | 19.75 | 35 |
| 8 | IM Lela Javakhishvili (GEO) | 2430 | ½ | 0 | 0 | 0 | ½ | 1 | 0 | | 1 | 1 | 4 | 4 | 15.25 | 35 |
| 9 | IM Olga Badelka (AUT) | 2426 | 0 | ½ | 0 | 0 | 1 | 0 | 1 | 0 | | 1 | 3½ | 4 | 13.5 | 20 |
| 10 | IM Nurgyul Salimova (BUL) | 2399 | ½ | 0 | 0 | 0 | 0 | ½ | 1 | 0 | 0 | | 2 | 5 | 9.25 | 10 |

== Grand Prix standings ==
| Invitee | Tbilisi | Shymkent | Monaco | Nicosia | Pune | Großlobming | Total | Events Pts |
|---|---|---|---|---|---|---|---|---|
| (China) Zhu Jiner | —N/a | —N/a | —N/a | 117.5 | 117.5 | 117.5 | 352.5 | 120 |
| (FIDE) Aleksandra Goryachkina | —N/a | 130 | 106.67 | 71.67 | —N/a | —N/a | 308.34 | 100 |
| (Ukraine) Anna Muzychuk | 71.67 | —N/a | —N/a | 117.5 | —N/a | 117.5 | 306.67 | 80 |
| (India) Koneru Humpy | —N/a | 55 | 106.67 | —N/a | 117.5 | —N/a | 279.17 | 60 |
| (China) Tan Zhongyi | —N/a | 105 | 65 | —N/a | —N/a | 85 | 255 | 40 |
| (Kazakhstan) Bibisara Assaubayeva | 105 | 77.5 | 15 | —N/a | —N/a | —N/a | 197.5 | 30 |
| (India) Divya Deshmukh | —N/a | 55 | —N/a | 40 | 85 | —N/a | 180 | 20 |
| (Georgia (country)) Nana Dzagnidze | 71.67 | —N/a | —N/a | 50 | —N/a | 55 | 176.67 | 5 |
| (Ukraine) Mariya Muzychuk | 50 | —N/a | —N/a | 71.67 | —N/a | 55 | 176.67 | 5 |
| (Greece) Stavroula Tsolakidou | 71.67 | 77.5 | —N/a | 25 | —N/a | —N/a | 174.17 | |
| (India) Harika Dronavalli | —N/a | —N/a | 35 | 71.67 | 65 | —N/a | 171.67 | |
| (India) Vaishali Rameshbabu | 35 | —N/a | —N/a | —N/a | 50 | 70 | 155 | |
| (Poland) Alina Kashlinskaya | 130 | —N/a | —N/a | —N/a | 20 | —N/a | 150 | |
| (Mongolia) Batkhuyag Munguntuul | —N/a | 15 | 106.67 | —N/a | 20 | —N/a | 141.67 | |
| (Switzerland) Alexandra Kosteniuk | 35 | —N/a | 50 | —N/a | —N/a | 35 | 120 | |
| (FIDE) Kateryna Lagno | —N/a | 40 | 65 | —N/a | —N/a | —N/a | 105 | |
| (Bulgaria) Nurgyul Salimova | —N/a | 30 | —N/a | —N/a | 40 | 10 | 80 | |
| (FIDE) Polina Shuvalova | —N/a | —N/a | —N/a | —N/a | 65 | —N/a | 65 | |
| (Georgia (country)) Lela Javakhishvili | 20 | —N/a | —N/a | —N/a | —N/a | 35 | 55 | |
| (Spain) Sarasadat Khademalsharieh | 10 | —N/a | 35 | —N/a | —N/a | —N/a | 45 | |
| (Austria) Olga Badelka | —N/a | —N/a | —N/a | 25 | —N/a | 20 | 45 | |
| (Germany) Elisabeth Pähtz | —N/a | 15 | 15 | 10 | —N/a | —N/a | 40 | |
| (Georgia (country)) Salome Melia | —N/a | —N/a | —N/a | —N/a | 20 | —N/a | 20 | |
