= Robert Fontaine =

French-Swiss chess grandmaster (born 1980)

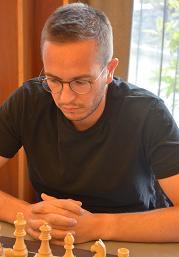

Personal information
- Born: 18 November 1980 (age 45) Suresnes, France
- Spouse: Kateryna Lagno (m. 2009, divorced)

Chess career
- Country: France (until 2016); Monaco (2016–2018); Switzerland (since 2018)
- Title: Grandmaster (2002)
- FIDE rating: 2527 (October 2026)
- Peak rating: 2572 (January 2008)

Robert Fontaine (born 18 November 1980) is a French chess player and journalist. He was awarded the title of Grandmaster by FIDE in 2002. He played under Monaco flag from 2016 to 2018 and now plays for Switzerland.

== Chess career ==
Born in 1980, Fontaine earned his international master title in 1997 and his grandmaster title in 2002. He was a professional chess player from 2002 to 2005, when he became a professional chess coach and director of the Cannes Chess Club. In 2004 Fontaine played on the French national team at the 36th Chess Olympiad. He also worked as a presenter for Europe Échecs. He joined Agon Limited as chief of staff in August 2012, but resigned after the World Chess Championship 2013. He transferred his national federation to Monaco in 2016 and to Switzerland in 2018.

== Personal life ==
On 25 February 2009, Fontaine married chess grandmaster Kateryna Lagno. The couple had a son together, but divorced some years later.
