= FIDE Women's Grand Swiss Tournament 2025 =

Chess tournament in Samarkand, Uzbekistan

FIDE Grand Swiss Tournament 2025
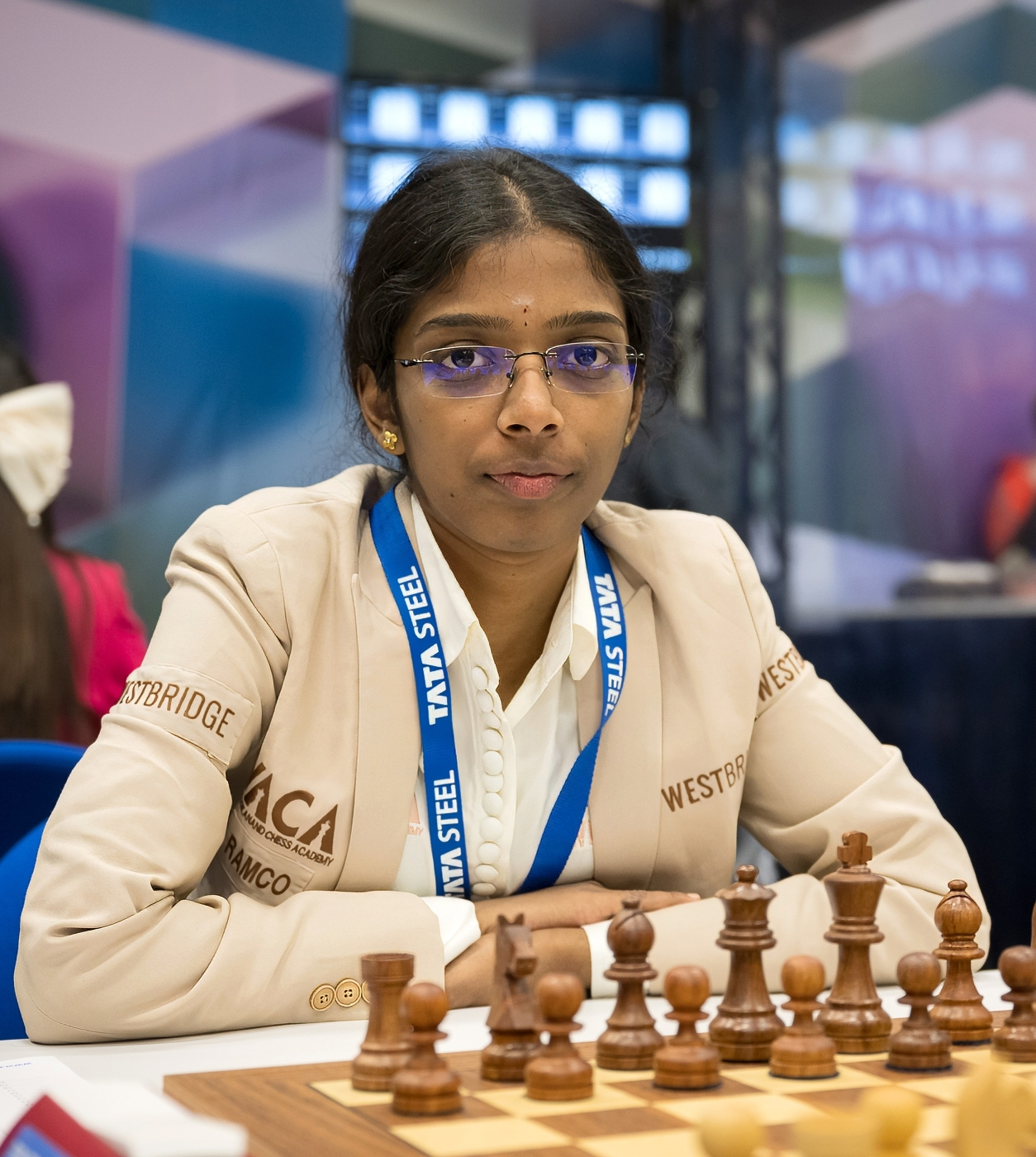
- 2025 Women's Grand Swiss tournament winner Vaishali Rameshbabu

Tournament information
- Sport: Chess
- Location: Samarkand, Uzbekistan
- Dates: 3 September 2025– 15 September 2025
- Administrator: FIDE
- Format: 11-round Swiss-system tournament
- Venue: Silk Road EXPO
- Participants: 56

Final positions
- Champion: (India) Vaishali Rameshbabu
- Runner-up: (FIDE) Kateryna Lagno

The FIDE Women's Grand Swiss Tournament 2025 was the third edition of the FIDE Women's Grand Swiss Tournament, a chess tournament that forms part of the qualification cycle for the Women's World Chess Championship. It was an 11-round Swiss-system tournament with 56 players competing from 4 September to 15 September 2025 in Samarkand, Uzbekistan. The winner, Vaishali Rameshbabu, and the runner-up, Kateryna Lagno, qualified for the Women's Candidates Tournament 2026.

The event was held at the same time and venue as the FIDE Grand Swiss Tournament 2025. Divya Deshmukh and Aleksandra Goryachkina, who had already qualified for the Women's Candidates, had played in the open event rather than the women's event.

== Format ==
The tournament had an 11-round Swiss format, with pairings made using the Dutch system for Swiss tournaments. The time control for each game was: 90 minutes for the first 40 moves, followed by 30 minutes for the rest of the game with an increment of 30 seconds per move starting from move 1. The total prize pool of the tournament was $230,000 USD, with the winner earning $40,000.

=== Tie-breaks ===
Tie-breaks between players who finished on the same score were determined, in order, by the following criteria:

1. Average rating of opponents, cut 1;
2. Buchholz system, cut 1;
3. Buchholz system;
4. The results of individual games between tied players;
5. Drawing of lots.

=== Venue and schedule ===
The tournament ran from 3 September to 15 September 2025 in Samarkand, Uzbekistan. The venue for the tournament was the Silk Road EXPO Hall in Samarkand.

Date	Event
3 September	Opening Ceremony
4 September	Round 1
5 September	Round 2
6 September	Round 3
7 September	Round 4
8 September	Round 5
9 September	Round 6
10 September	Free day
11 September	Round 7
12 September	Round 8
13 September	Round 9
14 September	Round 10
15 September	Round 11
15 September	Closing ceremony

== Results ==
2025 FIDE Women's Grand Swiss Tournament, 4–15 September 2025, Samarkand, Uzbekistan
Pos	Team	Rating	Pts	AROC-1
1	Vaishali Rameshbabu (IND)	2452	8	2434
2	Kateryna Lagno (RUS)	2505	8	2433
3	Bibisara Assaubayeva (KAZ)	2505	7.5	2425
4	Tan Zhongyi (CHN)	2531	7.5	2423
5	Song Yuxin (CHN)	2409	7.5	2411
6	Ulviyya Fataliyeva (AZE)	2384	7	2461
7	Irina Krush (USA)	2366	7	2419
8	Mariya Muzychuk (UKR)	2484	7	2404
9	Guo Qi (CHN)	2371	6.5	2436
10	Olga Girya (RUS)	2386	6.5	2430
11	Mai Narva (EST)	2386	6.5	2429
12	Anna Muzychuk (UKR)	2535	6.5	2417
13	Stavroula Tsolakidou (GRE)	2445	6.5	2409
14	Harika Dronavalli (IND)	2467	6.5	2401
15	Alexandra Kosteniuk (SUI)	2472	6.5	2391
16	Lu Miaoyi (CHN)	2449	6.5	2376
17	Khanim Balajayeva (AZE)	2331	6	2439
18	Elina Danielian (ARM)	2405	6	2421
19	Meruert Kamalidenova (KAZ)	2349	6	2414
20	Carissa Yip (USA)	2458	6	2399
21	Leya Garifullina (FIDE)	2477	6	2381
22	Anna Ushenina (UKR)	2409	6	2372
23	Lela Javakhishvili (GEO)	2434	6	2343
24	Dinara Wagner (GER)	2400	5.5	2459
25	Aleksandra Maltsevskaya (POL)	2379	5.5	2451
26	Zhai Mo (CHN)	2380	5.5	2421
27	Marsel Efroimski (ISR)	2377	5.5	2420
28	Zsoka Gaal (HUN)	2388	5.5	2419
29	Afruza Khamdamova (UZB)	2409	5.5	2418
30	Polina Shuvalova (FIDE)	2492	5.5	2408
31	Antoaneta Stefanova (BUL)	2395	5.5	2404
32	Yuliia Osmak (UKR)	2478	5.5	2387
33	Teodora Injac (SRB)	2454	5.5	2349
34	Olga Badelka (AUT)	2375	5	2431
35	Umida Omonova (UZB)	2252	5	2420
36	Vantika Agrawal (IND)	2381	5	2421
37	Elnaz Kaliakhmet (KAZ)	2299	5	2419
38	Gulrukhbegim Tokhirjonova (UZB)	2372	5	2418
39	Eline Roebers (NED)	2377	5	2413
40	Xeniya Balabayeva (KAZ)	2383	5	2404
41	Anna Shukhman (RUS)	2420	5	2373
42	Irina Bulmaga (ROM)	2400	5	2372
43	Nurgyul Salimova (BUL)	2386	4.5	2468
44	Govhar Beydullayeva (AZE)	2368	4.5	2417
45	Oliwia Kiolbasa (POL)	2405	4.5	2380
46	Mariia Manko (SUI)	2313	4.5	2380
47	Lilit Mkrtchian (ARM)	2393	4.5	2376
48	Meri Arabidze (GEO)	2444	4.5	2346
49	Maili-Jade Ouellet (CAN)	2348	4	2427
50	Madinabonu Khalilova (UZB)	2148	4	2418
51	Guldona Karimova (UZB)	2324	4	2409
52	Shrook Wafa (EGY)	2202	4	2388
53	Javiera Belén Gómez Barrera (CHI)	2173	3.5	2363
54	Klaudia Kulon (POL)	2361	3.5	2329
55	Lina Nassr (ALG)	2059	3	2393
56	Valentina Gunina (RUS)	2418	1.5	2397

Updated to match(es) played on 15 September 2025. Source: "2025 FIDE Women's Grand Swiss Tournament". chess-results.com.
Rules for classification: "Regulations for the FIDE Women's Grand Swiss Tournament" (PDF). FIDE.
