= Women's Candidates Tournament 2026 =

Chess tournament in Pegeia, Cyprus

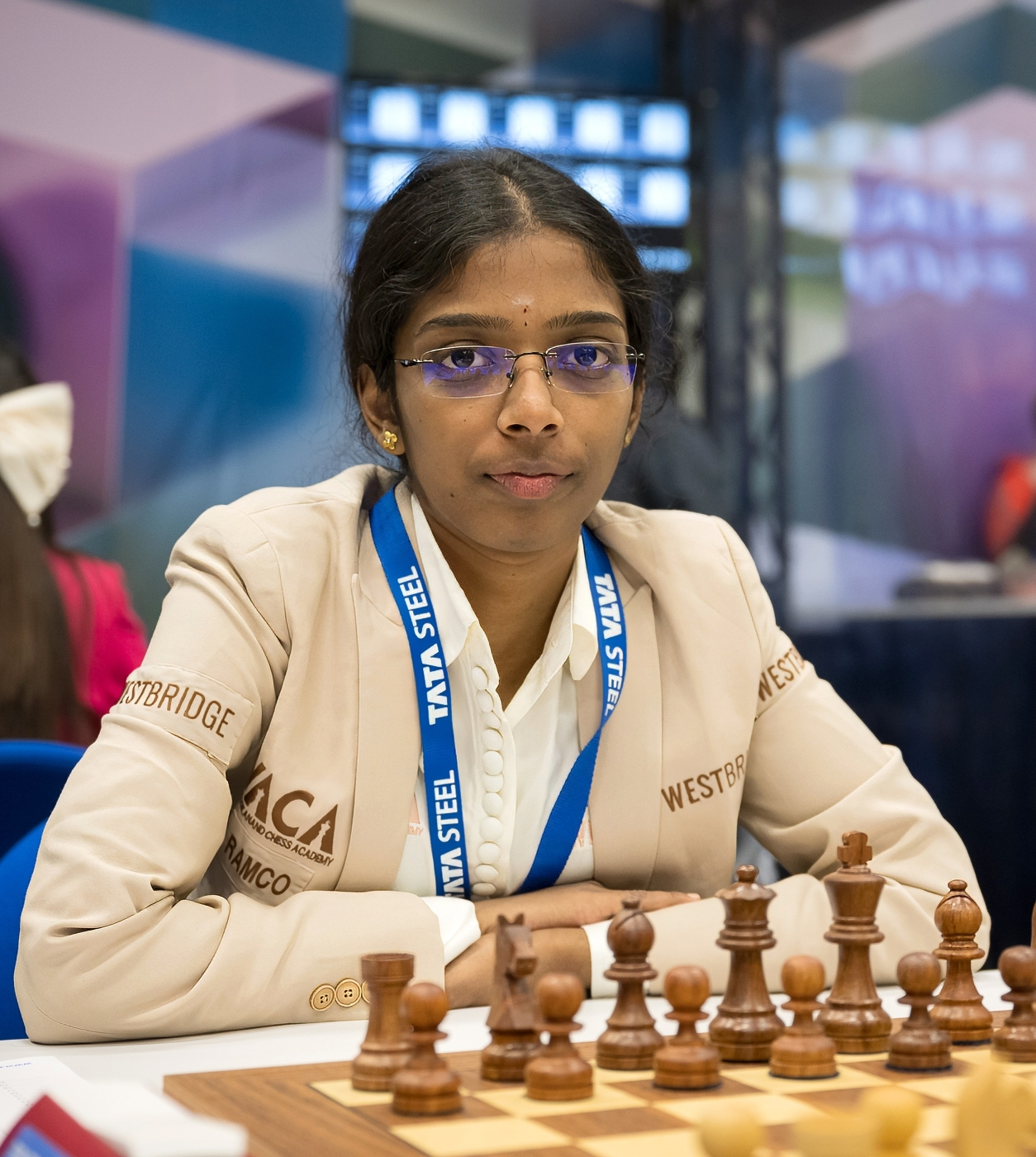
- Vaishali Rameshbabu, the winner of the tournament, advanced to the Women's World Chess Championship 2027 match.
- Venue: Cap St Georges Hotel and Resort
- Location: Pegeia, Cyprus
- Dates: 28 March – 16 April 2026
- Competitors: 8
- Winning score: 8.5 points of 14

Champion
- (India) Vaishali Rameshbabu

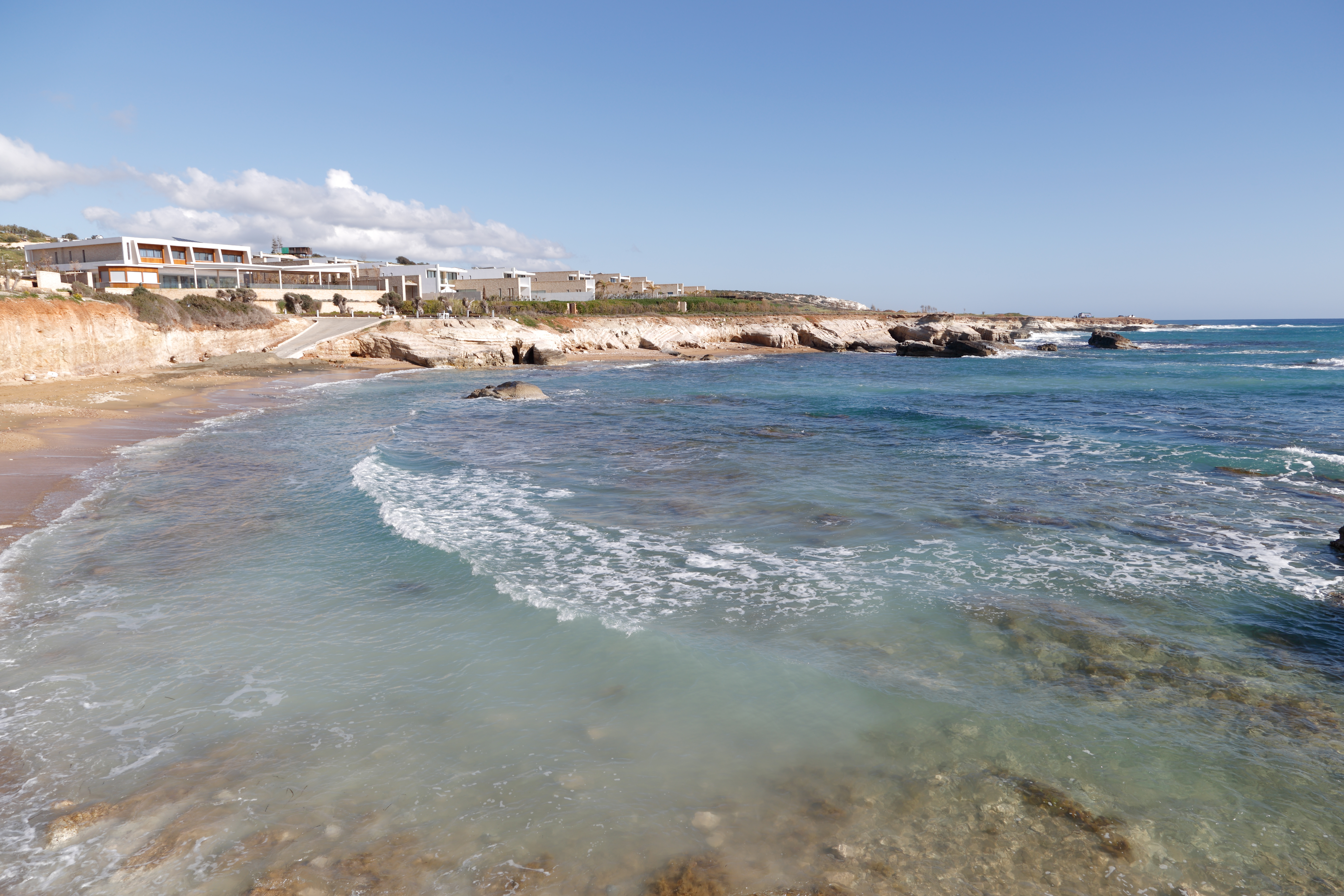
View of part of the Cap St. Georges Hotel and Resort where the tournament took place

The Women's Candidates Tournament 2026 was an eight-player chess tournament held to determine the challenger for the Women's World Chess Championship 2027. The tournament took place at the Cap St Georges Hotel and Resort in Pegeia, Cyprus, between 28 March and 16 April 2026. The event was held alongside the Candidates Tournament 2026.

It was a double round-robin tournament. Vaishali Rameshbabu, the lowest-rated player in the field, won the tournament and earned the right to play the Women's World Chess Championship 2027 match against the reigning Women's World Chess Champion Ju Wenjun.

== Qualification ==
The eight players to qualify to the Women's Candidates Tournament were:

Qualification method	Player	Age	Rating	World ranking
Qualification method	Player	(March 2026)		
The top two finishers in the FIDE Women's Grand Prix 2024–25	(China) Zhu Jiner (winner)	23	2578	2
The top two finishers in the FIDE Women's Grand Prix 2024–25	(FIDE) Aleksandra Goryachkina (runner-up)	27	2534	7
The top three finishers in the Women's Chess World Cup 2025	(India) Divya Deshmukh (winner)	20	2497	12
The top three finishers in the Women's Chess World Cup 2025	(India) ~~Koneru Humpy~~ (runner-up, withdrew)	39	2535	5
The top three finishers in the Women's Chess World Cup 2025	(China) Tan Zhongyi (third place)	34	2535	6
The top two finishers in the FIDE Women's Grand Swiss Tournament 2025	(India) Vaishali Rameshbabu (winner)	24	2470	18
The top two finishers in the FIDE Women's Grand Swiss Tournament 2025	(FIDE) Kateryna Lagno (runner-up)	36	2508	10
Highest place in the FIDE Women's Events 2024–25 not already qualified (Note: Koneru Humpy finished first in the 2024–2025 FIDE Women's Events circuit, but had already qualified for the Candidates through a second place finish at the Women's Chess World Cup 2025. As a result, the qualifying spot was awarded to the highest finisher of the FIDE Women's Events circuit who had not already qualified for the event (Bibisara Assaubayeva). Upon Koneru's withdrawal from the event on March 22, 2026, her spot went to the next highest finisher (Anna Muzychuk).)	(Kazakhstan) Bibisara Assaubayeva	22	2516	9
Highest place in the FIDE Women's Events 2024–25 not already qualified	(Ukraine) Anna Muzychuk (Replacement for Koneru)	36	2522	8

Humpy Koneru withdrew a week before the tournament began, citing safety concerns in Cyprus due to the 2026 Iran war. Anna Muzychuk, the next highest scoring player in the FIDE Women's Events Series, was brought on as a replacement.

=== FIDE Women's Events 2024–25 ===
In conjunction with the Open Candidates Tournament 2026, the runner-up of the previous championship match no longer automatically qualified, unlike any previous Women's Candidates Tournament. Instead, the 2025 match was part of the FIDE Women's Events 2024–25, a new qualification path which was a circuit that included the 2024 and 2025 World Rapid and Blitz Championships, the Grand Prix series, the World Cup and the Grand Swiss. A player's score was the sum of her highest scores in up to 5 qualifying events.

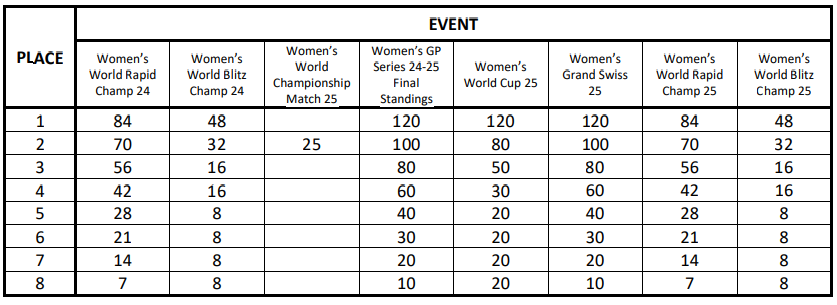
Ranking point system for the FIDE Women's Events 2024–25

- : Qualified for Women's Candidates Tournament 2026
- : Current World Champion – ineligible for Women's Candidates Tournament 2026 qualification
- : Player qualified for Women's Candidates Tournament 2026 via another path
- : Player ineligible for Women's Candidates Tournament 2026 qualification

Top 25 players as of December 2025
No.	Player	Points	Events	World Rapid 2024	World Blitz 2024	World Champ	Grand Prix	World Cup	Grand Swiss	World Rapid 2025	World Blitz 2025
1	(India) Koneru Humpy	280.00	4	1st 84.00	—N/a	—N/a	4th 60.00	2nd 80.00	—N/a	T 2nd-3rd 56.00	—N/a
2	(China) Tan Zhongyi	216.10	5	T 2nd-7th 38.50	—N/a	2nd 25.00	5th 40.00	3rd 50.00	T 3rd-5th 60.00	T 7th-14th 2.60	—N/a
3	(China) Zhu Jiner	214.00	4	—N/a	T 5th-8th 8.00	—N/a	1st 120.00	—N/a	—N/a	2nd 70.00	T 3rd-4th 16.00
4	(FIDE) Aleksandra Goryachkina	185.78	3	—N/a	—N/a	—N/a	2nd 100.00	—N/a	—N/a	1st 84.00	T 7th-15th 1.78
5	(India) Vaishali Rameshbabu	176.30	4	—N/a	T 3rd-4th 16.00	—N/a	—N/a	T 5th-8th 20.00	T 1st-2nd 110.00	T 4th-6th 30.30	—N/a
6	(FIDE) Kateryna Lagno	167.10	4	T 2nd-7th 38.50	T 3rd-4th 16.00	—N/a	—N/a	—N/a	T 1st-2nd 110.00	T 7th-14th 2.60	—N/a
7	(Kazakhstan) Bibisara Assaubayeva	147.40	5	T 8th-12th 1.40	T 5th-8th 8.00	—N/a	6th 30.00	—N/a	T 3rd-5th 60.00	—N/a	1st 48.00
8	(India) Divya Deshmukh	142.60	3	—N/a	—N/a	—N/a	7th 20.00	1st 120.00	—N/a	T 7th-14th 2.60	—N/a
9	(Ukraine) Anna Muzychuk	114.60	3	—N/a	—N/a	—N/a	3rd 80.00	—N/a	—N/a	T 7th-14th 2.60	2nd 32.00
10	(China) Ju Wenjun	86.50	2 (Note: Does not include the World Championship match that awarded Ju zero points.)	T 2nd-7th 38.50	1st 48.00	1st 0.00	—N/a	—N/a	—N/a	—N/a	—N/a
11	(China) Song Yuxin	81.78	3	—N/a	—N/a	—N/a	—N/a	T 5th-8th 20.00	T 3rd-5th 60.00	—N/a	T 7th-15th 1.78
12	(China) Lei Tingjie	64.60	3	—N/a	2nd 32.00	—N/a	—N/a	4th 30.00	—N/a	T 7th-14th 2.60	—N/a
13	(India) Harika Dronavalli	58.50	2	T 2nd-7th 38.50	—N/a	—N/a	—N/a	T 5th-8th 20.00	—N/a	—N/a	—N/a
14	(Uzbekistan) Afruza Khamdamova	38.50	1	T 2nd-7th 38.50	—N/a	—N/a	—N/a	—N/a	—N/a	—N/a	—N/a
14	(Switzerland) Alexandra Kosteniuk	41.10	2	T 2nd-7th 38.50	—N/a	—N/a	—N/a	—N/a	—N/a	T 7th-14th 2.60	—N/a
16	(India) Savitha Shri Baskar	30.30	1	—N/a	—N/a	—N/a	—N/a	—N/a	—N/a	T 4th-6th 30.30	—N/a
16	(Turkey) Ekaterina Atalik	30.30	1	—N/a	—N/a	—N/a	—N/a	—N/a	—N/a	T 4th-6th 30.30	—N/a
18	(Ukraine) Mariya Muzychuk	26.40	3	T 8th-12th 1.40	—N/a	—N/a	T 8th-9th 5.00	—N/a	T 6th-8th 20.00	—N/a	—N/a
19	(Georgia (country)) Nana Dzagnidze	25.00	2	—N/a	—N/a	—N/a	T 8th-9th 5.00	T 5th-8th 20.00	—N/a	—N/a	—N/a
20	(United States) Irina Krush	20.00	1	—N/a	—N/a	—N/a	—N/a	—N/a	T 6th-8th 20.00	—N/a	—N/a
20	(Azerbaijan) Ulviyya Fataliyeva	20.00	1	—N/a	—N/a	—N/a	—N/a	—N/a	T 6th-8th 20.00	—N/a	—N/a
22	(FIDE) Valentina Gunina	16.00	1	—N/a	T 5th-8th 8.00	—N/a	—N/a	—N/a	—N/a	—N/a	5th 8.00
22	(Netherlands) Eline Roebers	16.00	1	—N/a	—N/a	—N/a	—N/a	—N/a	—N/a	—N/a	T 3rd-4th 16.00
24	(United States) Carissa Yip	8.00	1	—N/a	T 5th-8th 8.00	—N/a	—N/a	—N/a	—N/a	—N/a	—N/a
24	(Bulgaria) Antoaneta Stefanova	8.00	1	—N/a	—N/a	—N/a	—N/a	—N/a	—N/a	—N/a	6th 8.00

== Organization ==
The tournament was an eight-player, double round-robin tournament, meaning there were 14 rounds with each player facing each of the others twice: once with the white pieces and once with the black pieces. The tournament winner will qualify to play Ju Wenjun for the World Championship in 2027.

=== Regulations ===
The time control was 90 minutes for the first 40 moves, then 30 minutes for the rest of the game, plus a 30-second increment per move starting from move 1. Players got 1 point for a win, ½ point for a draw and 0 points for a loss.

Tiebreaks for the first place would have been addressed as follows:

- If two players were tied, they would play two rapid chess games at 15 minutes plus 10 seconds per move. If a three- to six-way tie occurred, a single round-robin would be played. If seven or eight players are tied, a single round-robin would be played with a time limit of 10 minutes plus 5 seconds per move.
- If any players were tied for first after the rapid chess games, they would play two blitz chess games at 3 minutes plus 2 seconds per move. In the case of more than two players being tied, a single round-robin would be played.
- If any players were still tied for first after these blitz chess games, the remaining players would play a knock-out blitz tournament at the same time control. In each mini-match of the proposed knock-out tournament, the first player to win a game would win the mini-match.

Ties for places other than first were broken by, in order: (1) Sonneborn–Berger score; (2) total number of wins; (3) head-to-head score among tied players; (4) drawing of lots.

=== Prize money ===
The prize money was €28,000 for first place, €17,000 for second place, and €8,600 for third place (with players on the same number of points sharing prize money, irrespective of tie-breaks), plus €2,200 per half-point for every player, for a minimum total prize pool of €300,000, according to the regulations.

=== Arbiters ===
The Chief Arbiter for the event was Takis Nikolopoulos (Greece) with Andrew Howie (Scotland) and Ana Srebrnič (Slovakia) both acting as Deputy Chief Arbiter and Fair Play Officer.

=== Schedule ===
On 10 November 2025, FIDE announced the following schedule. Matches began daily at 15:30 EEST (UTC +3).

Date	Day	Event
28 March	Saturday	Opening Ceremony
28 March	Saturday	Media Day
28 March	Saturday	Technical Meeting
29 March	Sunday	Round 1
30 March	Monday	Round 2
31 March	Tuesday	Round 3
1 April	Wednesday	Round 4
2 April	Thursday	Rest Day
3 April	Friday	Round 5
4 April	Saturday	Round 6
5 April	Sunday	Round 7
6 April	Monday	Rest Day
7 April	Tuesday	Round 8
8 April	Wednesday	Round 9
9 April	Thursday	Round 10
10 April	Friday	Rest Day
11 April	Saturday	Round 11
12 April	Sunday	Round 12
13 April	Monday	Rest Day
14 April	Tuesday	Round 13
15 April	Wednesday	Round 14
16 April	Thursday	Tie-breakers (if required)
16 April	Thursday	Closing Ceremony

== Results ==
=== Standings ===
Standings of the 2026 Women's Candidates Tournament
Rank	Player	Score	SB	Wins	Qualification	VR		BA		ZJ		AG		AM		KL		DD		TZ	
1	Vaishali Rameshbabu (IND)	8.5 / 14	55.75	5	Advanced to title match			½	½	0	0	½	1	½	½	1	1	1	½	1	½
2	Bibisara Assaubayeva (KAZ)	8 / 14	56.25	4		½	½			1	1	½	½	1	½	1	0	0	½	½	½
3	Zhu Jiner (CHN)	7.5 / 14	50.5	5		1	1	0	0			0	½	0	½	1	½	½	1	½	1
4	Aleksandra Goryachkina (FIDE)	7.5 / 14	50.25	3		0	½	½	½	½	1			½	½	½	0	½	1	1	½
5	Anna Muzychuk (UKR)	7 / 14	49.25	2		½	½	½	0	½	1	½	½			1	½	0	½	½	½
6	Kateryna Lagno (FIDE)	6.5 / 14	43	4		0	0	1	0	½	0	1	½	½	0			1	½	½	1
7	Divya Deshmukh (IND)	5.5 / 14	40.25	2		½	0	½	1	0	½	0	½	½	1	½	0			0	½
8	Tan Zhongyi (CHN)	5.5 / 14	38.25	1		½	0	½	½	0	½	½	0	½	½	0	½	½	1		

Source: FIDE
Rules for classification: For first place: tie-break games. For subsequent spots: (1) results in tie-break games for first place, if any; (2) Sonneborn–Berger score (SB); (3) total number of wins; (4) head-to-head score among tied players; (5) drawing of lots.
Note: Numbers in the crosstable in a white background indicate the result playing the respective opponent with the white pieces (black pieces if on a black background). This does not give information which of the two games was played in the first half of the tournament, and which in the second.

=== Points by round ===
This table shows the total number of wins minus the total number of losses each player has after each round. The symbol '=' indicates the player had won and lost the same number of games after that round. Green backgrounds indicate the player(s) with the highest score after each round. Red backgrounds indicate players who could no longer win the tournament after each round.

Rank	Player	Rounds													
Rank	Player	1	2	3	4	5	6	7	8	9	10	11	12	13	14
1	Vaishali Rameshbabu (IND)	=	=	=	=	−1	=	+1	+1	+2	+2	+3	+2	+2	+3
2	Bibisara Assaubayeva (KAZ)	=	=	+1	+1	=	−1	−1	−1	−1	=	=	+1	+2	+2
3	Zhu Jiner (CHN)	=	=	−1	=	+1	=	=	+1	+2	+1	+1	+2	+1	+1
4	Aleksandra Goryachkina (FIDE)	=	=	=	=	=	=	=	−1	−1	=	−1	−1	=	+1
5	Anna Muzychuk (UKR)	=	=	=	+1	+1	+2	+2	+1	+1	+1	+1	+1	=	=
6	Kateryna Lagno (FIDE)	=	=	+1	=	+1	=	=	+1	=	=	=	−1	=	−1
7	Divya Deshmukh (IND)	=	=	=	−1	−1	=	=	+1	=	−1	−1	−2	−3	−3
8	Tan Zhongyi (CHN)	=	=	−1	−1	−1	−1	−2	−3	−3	−3	−3	−2	−2	−3

=== Results by round ===
In February 2026, FIDE announced pairings for the tournament.

Round 1 (29 March)
Divya Deshmukh	½–½	Anna Muzychuk	C45 Scotch Game
Vaishali Rameshbabu	½–½	Bibisara Assaubayeva	B32 Closed Sicilian
Aleksandra Goryachkina	½–½	Kateryna Lagno	C84 Ruy Lopez Closed
Zhu Jiner	½–½	Tan Zhongyi	C55 Two Knights Defense
Round 2 (30 March)
Anna Muzychuk (½)	½–½	Tan Zhongyi (½)	C42 Petrov Classical
Kateryna Lagno (½)	½–½	Zhu Jiner (½)	C07 French Tarrasch
Bibisara Assaubayeva (½)	½–½	Aleksandra Goryachkina (½)	D40 Semi-Tarrasch Defense
Divya Deshmukh (½)	½–½	Vaishali Rameshbabu (½)	D31 Queen's Gambit Declined
Round 3 (31 March)
Vaishali Rameshbabu (1)	½–½	Anna Muzychuk (1)	C55 Two Knights Defense
Aleksandra Goryachkina (1)	½–½	Divya Deshmukh (1)	B31 Sicilian Rossolimo
Zhu Jiner (1)	0–1	Bibisara Assaubayeva (1)	B30 Sicilian Rossolimo
Tan Zhongyi (1)	0–1	Kateryna Lagno (1)	C53 Giuoco Piano
Round 4 (1 April)
Anna Muzychuk (1½)	1–0	Kateryna Lagno (2)	C85 Ruy Lopez Closed
Bibisara Assaubayeva (2)	½–½	Tan Zhongyi (1½)	D30 Queen's Gambit Declined
Divya Deshmukh (1½)	0–1	Zhu Jiner (1)	A21 English Opening
Vaishali Rameshbabu (1½)	½–½	Aleksandra Goryachkina (1½)	C55 Two Knights Defense
Round 5 (3 April)
Aleksandra Goryachkina (2)	½–½	Anna Muzychuk (2½)	B31 Sicilian Rossolimo
Zhu Jiner (2)	1–0	Vaishali Rameshbabu (2)	C55 Two Knights Defense
Tan Zhongyi (1½)	½–½	Divya Deshmukh (1½)	D30 Queen's Gambit Declined
Kateryna Lagno (2)	1–0	Bibisara Assaubayeva (2½)	B34 Closed Sicilian
Round 6 (4 April)
Zhu Jiner (3)	0–1	Anna Muzychuk (3)	C50 Giuoco Pianissimo
Tan Zhongyi (2)	½–½	Aleksandra Goryachkina (2½)	C58 Two Knights Defense
Kateryna Lagno (3)	0–1	Vaishali Rameshbabu (2)	C28 Vienna Game
Bibisara Assaubayeva (2½)	0–1	Divya Deshmukh (2)	D52 Queen's Gambit Declined
Round 7 (5 April)
Anna Muzychuk (4)	½–½	Bibisara Assaubayeva (2½)	B30 Sicilian Rossolimo
Divya Deshmukh (3)	½–½	Kateryna Lagno (3)	A13 English Agincourt Defense
Vaishali Rameshbabu (3)	1–0	Tan Zhongyi (2½)	B07 Pirc Defence
Aleksandra Goryachkina (3)	½–½	Zhu Jiner (3)	C80 Ruy Lopez Open

Round 8 (7 April)
Anna Muzychuk (4½)	0–1	Divya Deshmukh (3½)	B27 Sicilian Hyperaccelerated Dragon
Bibisara Assaubayeva (3)	½–½	Vaishali Rameshbabu (4)	C55 Two Knights Defense
Kateryna Lagno (3½)	1–0	Aleksandra Goryachkina (3½)	C45 Scotch Game
Tan Zhongyi (2½)	0–1	Zhu Jiner (3½)	E32 Nimzo-Indian Classical
Round 9 (8 April)
Tan Zhongyi (2½)	½–½	Anna Muzychuk (4½)	D80 Grünfeld Defence
Zhu Jiner (4½)	1–0	Kateryna Lagno (4½)	A06 Zukertort Opening
Aleksandra Goryachkina (3½)	½–½	Bibisara Assaubayeva (3½)	B30 Sicilian Rossolimo
Vaishali Rameshbabu (4½)	1–0	Divya Deshmukh (4½)	A06 Nimzowitsch–Larsen Attack
Round 10 (9 April)
Anna Muzychuk (5)	½–½	Vaishali Rameshbabu (5½)	C55 Two Knights Defense
Divya Deshmukh (4½)	0–1	Aleksandra Goryachkina (4)	C90 Ruy Lopez Closed
Bibisara Assaubayeva (4)	1–0	Zhu Jiner (5½)	D43 Semi-Slav Defense
Kateryna Lagno (4½)	½–½	Tan Zhongyi (3)	B28 Sicilian O'Kelly
Round 11 (11 April)
Kateryna Lagno (5)	½–½	Anna Muzychuk (5½)	E15 Queen's Indian Defense
Tan Zhongyi (3½)	½–½	Bibisara Assaubayeva (5)	B30 Sicilian Rossolimo
Zhu Jiner (5½)	½–½	Divya Deshmukh (4½)	B30 Sicilian Rossolimo
Aleksandra Goryachkina (5)	0–1	Vaishali Rameshbabu (6)	D02 London System
Round 12 (12 April)
Anna Muzychuk (6)	½–½	Aleksandra Goryachkina (5)	C84 Ruy Lopez Closed
Vaishali Rameshbabu (7)	0–1	Zhu Jiner (6)	B12 Caro–Kann Defence
Divya Deshmukh (5)	0–1	Tan Zhongyi (4)	C44 King's Knight Opening
Bibisara Assaubayeva (5½)	1–0	Kateryna Lagno (5½)	C53 Giuoco Piano
Round 13 (14 April)
Bibisara Assaubayeva (6½)	1–0	Anna Muzychuk (6½)	C45 Scotch Game
Kateryna Lagno (5½)	1–0	Divya Deshmukh (5)	B12 Caro–Kann Defence
Tan Zhongyi (5)	½–½	Vaishali Rameshbabu (7)	D32 Tarrasch Defense
Zhu Jiner (7)	0–1	Aleksandra Goryachkina (5½)	C50 Giuoco Pianissimo
Round 14 (15 April)
Anna Muzychuk (6½)	½–½	Zhu Jiner (7)	B22 Alapin Sicilian
Aleksandra Goryachkina (6½)	1–0	Tan Zhongyi (5½)	C42 Petrov Classical
Vaishali Rameshbabu (7½)	1–0	Kateryna Lagno (6½)	B76 Dragon Sicilian
Divya Deshmukh (5)	½–½	Bibisara Assaubayeva (7½)	A45 Indian Defence

== See also ==
- Candidates Tournament 2026
- Women's Candidates Tournament
