= Zhu Jiner =

Chinese chess grandmaster (born 2002)

- Zhu Jiner at the 2026 Chess Olympiad

Personal information
- Born: 16 November 2002 (age 23) Jiaxing, Zhejiang, China

Chess career
- Country: China
- Title: Grandmaster (2023)
- FIDE rating: 2559 (November 2026)
- Peak rating: 2579 (November 2025)

Zhu Jiner (Chinese: 朱锦尔; pinyin: Zhū Jǐn'ěr; born 16 November 2002) is a Chinese chess grandmaster.

She won the FIDE Women's Grand Prix 2024-25. She won individual gold medals at Chess Olympiad 2024 and 2026, also winning the team gold in the latter. She was ranked 2 among women in October 2025.

== Chess career ==
In 2016, she won the World Youth Chess Championship in the G14 age category. In 2017, she placed third in the Women's World Chess Championship Asian Zone 3.5 tournament after Zhai Mo and Ni Shiqun, which qualified her for the Women's World Chess Championship 2018 (November). That same year, she was awarded the FIDE Woman International Master (WIM) title. In 2018, Zhu Jiner won the bronze medal at the Women's China Rapid Chess Championship.

She participated in the first three legs of the FIDE Women's Grand Prix 2022–23. In Astana, the first leg, she finished third with a score of 6.5/11, in Munich she tied for fifth place with a score of 5.5/11 and in New Delhi, she tied for first place with Aleksandra Goryachkina and Bibisara Assaubayeva with a score of 6/9. Her New Delhi performance earned her her last GM norm, and she was awarded the title in August 2023.

In August 2024, Zhu scored 5/9 at the Abu Dhabi Masters, including a draw with Vasyl Ivanchuk and a win over prodigy Yagiz Kaan Erdogmus. Zhu then played on Board 1 for China at the 45th Chess Olympiad. She finished with a score of 7/9 and a performance rating of 2597, earning an individual gold medal.The following month, Zhu helped TAJFUN-ŠK Ljubljana win the 28th European Chess Club Cup with a score of 6/7 and a performance rating of 2693. As a result, Zhu achieved a new peak rating of 2514.

Due to the withdrawal of Lei Tingjie, Zhu participated in the last three events of the FIDE Women's Grand Prix 2024–25 as a rating replacement. Zhu tied for first place at each tournament, scoring 6/9 at Nicosia, 7/9 in Pune, and 6/9 in Großlobming. With these results, Zhu won the Grand Prix series and qualified for the Women's Candidates Tournament 2026.

Zhu also participated in the Women's Chess World Cup 2025. She was knocked out in the fourth round by the eventual champion, Divya Deshmukh.

Zhu participated in the 1st Fujairah Global Championships as the lowest seed in the Superstars section. She achieved a score of 5.5/9, defeating the higher-rated Yuriy Kuzubov, Alexander Motylev, and Ivan Cheparinov, losing only her game to top seed Nihal Sarin. She finished the tournament in 5th place, attaining a career-high performance rating of 2702. Zhu then repeated her triumph at the 29th European Club Cup, helping TAJFUN-ŠK Ljubljana to third place by scoring 5/6, performing at a rating of 2713.

Zhu ended 2025 at a peak rating of 2579 and the World #2 among women, trailing only Hou Yifan.

Zhu participated in the Women's Candidates Tournament 2026. She finished third with a score of 7.5/14 (+5−4=5).

In May 2026 Zhu participated in TePe Sigeman & Co chess tournament, finishing the tournament on 7th place (+1-4=2) Scoring a win against Andy Woodward, Her fighting loss against Magnus Carlsen in Round 5 gained much appreciation. Zhu finished 2nd at Norway Chess Women, trailing 1st place Bibisara Assaubayeva by only ½ point, she lost two classical games and won three including one against World Champion Ju Wenjun.

In September 2026, Zhu played board 1 for the Chinese Women's team that won gold medals in the Women's event of the 46th Chess Olympiad, She achieved individual gold with a performance rating of 2638 scoring 7/9 (+5-0=4), this was China's seventh team gold at the Women's Chess Olympiad and the first since 2018.

== Personal life ==
Zhu graduated from Shanghai University of Finance and Economics in 2025.

== See also ==
- Chess in China
- Women in chess
