= Vaishali Rameshbabu =

Indian chess grandmaster (born 2001)

- Vaishali at the 46th Chess Olympiad

Personal information
- Born: 21 June 2001 (age 25) Chennai, Tamil Nadu, India

Chess career
- Country: India
- Title: Grandmaster (2024)
- FIDE rating: 2452 (October 2026)
- Peak rating: 2506 (August 2024)

Vaishali Rameshbabu (born 21 June 2001) is an Indian chess grandmaster. She is a two-time champion of the FIDE Women's Grand Swiss Tournament, winning consecutively in 2023 and 2025. Having played in two editions of the Women's Candidates Tournament, she won the 2026 edition to earn the right to challenge Ju Wenjun for the title of Women's World Chess Champion in the upcoming championship match held in 2027.

Representing India, she was part of the team that won the silver medal at the 2022 Asian Games in the women's team competition. She was a member of the Indian womens team that won the gold medal in the 45th Chess Olympiad and bronze medal in both 44th Chess Olympiad and 46th Chess Olympiad.

== Personal life ==
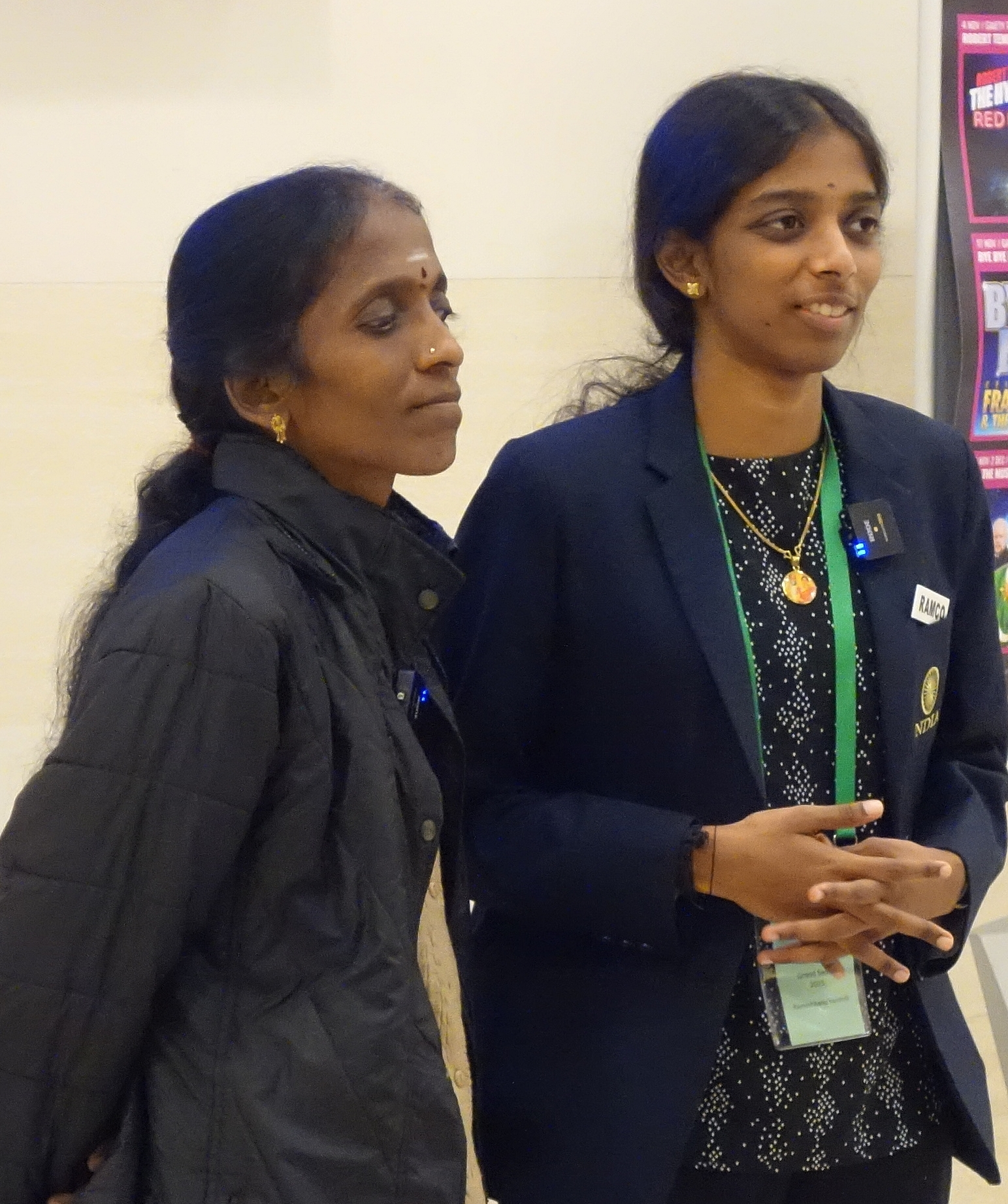
Vaishali pictured with her mother, Nagalakshmi (left).

Vaishali was born in Chennai, Tamil Nadu on 21 June 2001. Her father, Rameshbabu, works as a branch manager at TNSC Bank, and her mother, Nagalakshmi, is a homemaker. Her younger brother R Praggnanandhaa is also a chess grandmaster; they are the first brother and sister duo to hold the title.

== Career ==
=== 2012-2019: Beginnings ===
Vaishali won the Girls' World Youth Chess Championship for Under-12s in 2012 and Under-14s in 2015. In 2013, at age 12, she defeated future World Chess Champion Magnus Carlsen in a simul competition that Carlsen held while in her hometown of Chennai for the World Chess Championship 2013.

She won the National Junior Girls Chess Championship (India) consequently in 2015 and 2016.

In 2016, she received the Woman International Master (WIM) title, and in October 2016, she was ranked second in India and World No.12 girl U16-player. At that time, she had an Elo rating of 2300.

She became a Woman Grandmaster (WGM) by completing her final norm in the Riga Technical University Open chess tournament in Riga, Latvia on 12 August 2018.

=== 2020-2022: IM title and Olympiad ===
Vaishali was the part of the gold medal-winning team at Online Olympiad 2020, where India won its first ever medal.

She received her International Master (IM) title in 2021. In 2022, Vaishali won the 8th Fischer Memorial, scoring 7/9 and winning her second Grandmaster norm.

Vaishali was invited to participate in the FIDE Women's Speed Chess Championship 2022, where she defeated the Women's World Blitz Chess Champion Bibisara Assaubayeva in the round of 16, and compatriot Harika Dronavalli in the quarterfinals.

Vaishali played on Board 3 in the Women's section at the 44th Chess Olympiad at Mamallapuram, Chennai, in July-Aug 2022. The India women's team won the team bronze medal, and Vaishali won individual bronze for board 3.

In December 2022, Vaishali won the Tata Stel Chess India 2022 Blitz Women in Kolkata, scoring 13½/18.

=== 2023-2025: Double Grand Swiss Champion and Olympiad Gold ===
Vaishali played in the Tata Steel Challengers 2023, scoring 4.5/14 and beating two 2600-rated GMs, Luis Paulo Supi and Jerguš Pecháč. She finished twelfth in the standings overall.

In the Qatar Masters Open 2023, Vaishali received her final GM norm after finishing with 5/9 and a performance rating of 2609. She also won the top women's prize in the tournament, after finishing with better tiebreaks (performance rating) than compatriot Divya Deshmukh.

In November 2023, Vaishali won the FIDE Women's Grand Swiss held in the Isle of Man going undefeated with the score 8.5/11, and qualified for the 2024 Women's Candidates Tournament. She and her younger brother Praggnanandhaa became the first sister-brother duo to qualify for the respective Candidates.

In December, at the IV El Llobregat Open Tournament 2023 in Spain, Vaishali crossed the 2500 Elo rating threshold, thereby fulfilling all of the requirements for the Grandmaster title and becoming the third woman and 84th person in India to do so.

On January 31, 2024, the India Chess Federation submitted a Grandmaster Title Application on behalf of Vaishali to the FIDE Qualification Committee, which administers FIDE titles. She became the first female Grandmaster from Tamilnadu.

Vaishali finished 4th at the Women's Candidates Tournament 2024 with the score 7½/14 (+6-5=3), the same score as that of 2nd place Koneru Humpy and 3rd place Lei Tingjie but with worse tiebreaks, she was tied for 3rd after 5 rounds but lost the next 4 games to reach last place and then made an incredible comeback with 5 consecutive wins to end the tournament on a positive score.

In September 2024, Vaishali played Board 2 for the Indian team that won Gold in the women's section of the 45th Chess Olympiad. This marked India's first ever win at the Women's Chess Olympiad.

In December 2024, Vaishali won bronze medal in the Women's World Blitz Chess Championship she finished 1st in the round robin section and was defeated in the semifinals by eventual winner Ju Wenjun.

In September 2025, Vaishali defended her Grand Swiss title at the FIDE Women's Grand Swiss 2025 held in Samarkand, Uzbekistan, scoring 8/11. Thus, she qualified for the Women's Candidates Tournament 2026.

=== 2026: Candidates and World Championship ===
Vaishali won the FIDE Women's Candidates Tournament 2026, scoring 8.5/14 (+5−2=7). She will play in the Women's World Championship 2027 against Ju Wenjun.

In June 2026, she won the Rapid section of WR Women's Chess Tour 2026 Asia Leg, defeating Irene Sukandar 1.5–0.5 in the quarterfinal, Kateryna Lagno 1.5–0.5 in the semifinal and Alua Nurman 1.5–0.5 in the final. She also participated in World Rapid and Blitz Team Chess Championships 2026 as part of the Chess Gurukul Team, They finished 5th in the Rapid section and Vaishali won Bronze for Board 6. In July, Vaishali finished last of 6 players in the Challengers section of Biel Chess Festival. In August, Vaishali finished last of 10 players at Cairns Cup scoring 2½/9 (+0-4=5).

In September, Vaishali played on Board 2 for Indian Women's team that won bronze in the Women's event of the 46th Chess Olympiad, she performed poorly scoring 2½/6 (+1-2=3) losing two critical games, she was rested after round 8.

== Awards ==
=== National ===
- Arjuna Award: 2024
