= Bibisara Assaubayeva =

Kazakhstani chess grandmaster (born 2004)

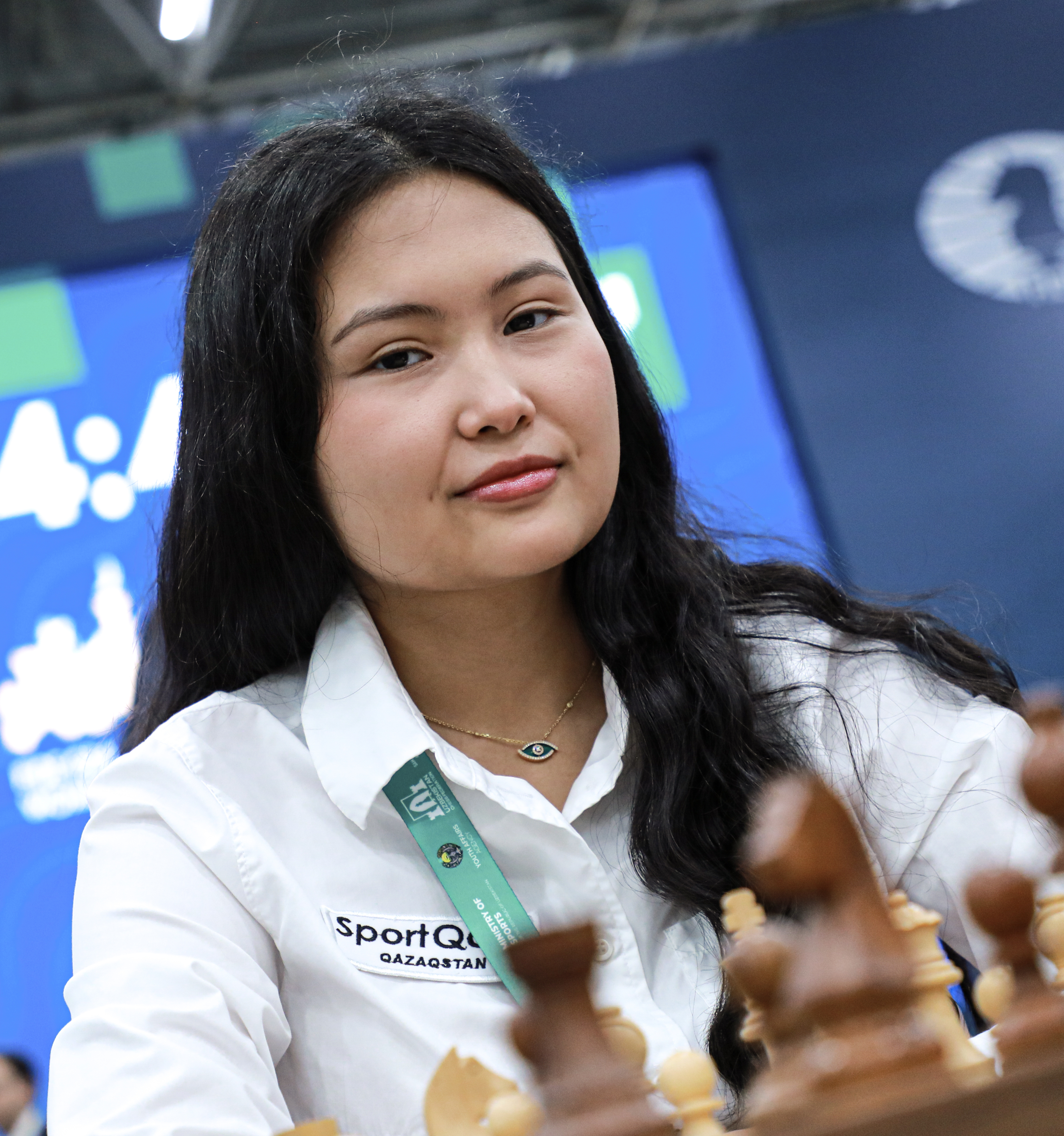
- Assaubayeva in 2025

Personal information
- Born: 26 February 2004 (age 22) Taraz, Kazakhstan

Chess career
- Country: Kazakhstan (pre-2016; since 2019); Russia (2016–2019)
- Title: Grandmaster (2025)
- FIDE rating: 2532 (November 2026)
- Peak rating: 2538 (July 2026)
- Peak ranking: No. 5 (July 2026)

Bibisara Assaubayeva (Kazakh: Бибісара Асаубаева, romanized: Bïbisara Asawbaeva; born 26 February 2004) is a Kazakhstani chess grandmaster. She was given the award of Outstanding Female Chess Player of 2021 in Asia by the international chess governing body FIDE while still a teenager. In 2021, she became the youngest Women's World Blitz Chess Champion, and retained the title in 2022 and 2025. She was part of the Kazakhstan Women's team that won silver medal in the 2024 and 2026 editions of the Women's Chess Olympiad.

== Early life ==
Born in Taraz, Kazakhstan, Assaubayeva is the eldest of three children born to her mother, Liana Tanzharikova. She played her first chess game at the age of four, taught by her grandfather. She won her first city championship when she was six years old. She achieved the title of Woman FIDE Master at the age of 7 in 2011, when she won the World Youth Chess Championship in Caldas Novas, Brazil in the Girls U8 section. She also competed in artistic gymnastics, being a several-time champion of Astana, Kazakhstan.

== Chess career ==
=== 2016-2019 ===
In 2016, Assaubayeva moved to Moscow, Russia with her family and switched her federation affiliation to Russia. She won the gold medal at the World Cadets Chess Championship in Batumi, Georgia in the Girls U12 category, and the next year won silver in the Girls U14 division in Montevideo, Uruguay. Also in 2017, at the age of 13, she competed in the European Individual Championship in Minsk. She won three games, lost three, and drew four, gaining a norm for the title of International Master.

In 2019, Assaubayeva decided to move back to Kazakhstan and switched her national federation back to it; she had never applied for Russian citizenship while living in Russia. In March 2019, she made her debut on the Kazakhstani national team at the Women's World Team Championship on the 3rd and 2nd boards and earned 5 points out of 9, which was the best result on the team.

=== 2021 ===
In August 2021, Assaubayeva won the Asian Continental Chess Championship/Asian Women's Continental Chess Championship with an undefeated score of 7.5/9 points, securing a spot in the FIDE Grand Swiss Tournament.

In December 2021, Assaubayeva finished second behind Alexandra Kosteniuk in the Women's World Rapid Championship, held in Warsaw, Poland. Two days later, she became the Women's World Blitz champion, winning the event with a round to spare and a score of 14/17, winning 13 games.

=== 2022 ===
In June 2022, Assaubayeva was officially entered into the Guinness World Records book as the youngest women's World Blitz Champion in chess history. She became the first Kazakhstani chess player ever featured in the book for individual chess achievements.

In August 2022, Assaubayeva was awarded the title of Outstanding Female Chess Player of 2021 in Asia by the international chess governing body FIDE during the 44th Chess Olympiad in Chennai, India.

In December 2022, Assaubayeva successfully defended her title at the Women's World Blitz Chess Championship in Almaty, Kazakhstan, scoring 13/17 points to finish in sole first place. That month, she also won the silver medal at the Belt and Road World Chess Woman's Summit Tournament in China, finishing level with the winner on 8.5/11 points but placing second on tiebreaks.

=== 2023 ===
In September 2023, Assaubayeva led the Kazakhstani national team on board one to a silver medal finish at the FIDE World Women's Team Chess Championship in Bydgoszcz, Poland, losing only the final match against Georgia.

In October 2023, Assaubayeva won the bronze medal in the Women's Team Standard event at the delayed 2022 Asian Games in Hangzhou, China, representing Kazakhstan, after a decisive 3–1 final round performance against Uzbekistan.

=== 2024 ===
In September 2024, Assaubayeva anchored the Kazakhstani national team on board one at the 45th Chess Olympiad in Budapest, Hungary. She scored an undefeated 7/10 points, with four victories, including a critical win against India's Harika Dronavalli, and six draws. Her performance guided Kazakhstan to the silver medal behind tournament winner India, marking both her first career Olympiad medal and the first-ever team podium finish for Kazakhstan at a FIDE Chess Olympiad.

In October 2024, Assaubayeva debuted in the second edition of the Tech Mahindra Global Chess League in London, competing as a drafted star for the American Gambits franchise. Playing on the designated women's board, she scored 11 game points across 10 rapid matches, highlighted by critical victories over grandmasters Elisabeth Pähtz and Valentina Gunina. Her performance anchored the American Gambits to a joint second-place podium finish in the final tournament standings alongside the PBG Alaskan Knights, falling just short of the championship final.

=== 2025 ===
At the 2025 Sharjah Masters tournament, Assaubayeva qualified for the grandmaster title, having both completed her final norm as well as achieved the required 2500 rating. She became the 43rd female chess player to achieve the title and the second from her country.

At the Grenke Freestyle Open in 2025, Assaubayeva was one of the two best female players with 6/9 points, and placed 42nd among all 299 players. Consequently, she was the first woman to be invited to a Freestyle Chess Grand Slam at Las Vegas in July 2025. However, she finished last in the group stage and also lost in the knockout round 1 of the lower bracket.

In September 2025, Assaubayeva competed in the third edition of the FIDE Women's Grand Swiss Tournament held in Samarkand, Uzbekistan. She finished undefeated with a score of 7.5/11 points consisting of four wins and seven draws, securing the clear third-place bronze medal behind tournament winner Vaishali Rameshbabu and runner-up Kateryna Lagno.

In December 2025, Assaubayeva competed in the FIDE Women's World Blitz Chess Championship held in Doha, Qatar. Following 15 rounds of Swiss-system qualifying, she finished in a five-way tie for first place with 11/15 points, advancing to the four-player knockout stage based on superior tiebreak criteria. In the semifinals, she defeated Zhu Jiner 3–0 before overcoming Anna Muzychuk 2.5–1.5 in the final match to secure her third career world blitz title. The victory also earned her a direct qualification slot for the Women's Candidates Tournament 2026 through the FIDE Women's Events 2024–25, becoming the first Kazakhstani chess player in history to qualify for the Candidates Tournament.

=== 2026 ===
In January, Assaubayeva placed 5th in the Challengers section of Tata Steel Chess Tournament, she scored 7½/13 points (+4-2=7), With a performance rating of 2604 to gain 19 rating points.

In February, Assaubayeva became the first player to qualify for the inaugural FIDE Women's Freestyle Chess World Championship 2027, after defeating Alexandra Kosteniuk 2.5–1.5 in a four-game selection exhibition match. The finals are scheduled to take place in Weissenhaus, Germany, in February 2027.

Assaubayeva participated in the Women's Candidates Tournament 2026. She was in 5th place after 11 rounds, then won her next two games to join Vaishali R in joint lead. In the final round, Assaubayeva drew her game against Divya Deshmukh, allowing Vaishali to win the tournament with a win against Kateryna Lagno. Assaubayeva finished the tournament in 2nd place with a score of 8/14.

Assaubayeva won the Women's section of Norway Chess 2026 with a round to spare, scoring 16.5/30, against a field consisting of Women's World Champion Ju Wenjun, former challenger Koneru Humpy, Zhu Jiner, Anna Muzychuk and Divya Deshmukh, This helped her climb to a career-high rank of number 5 among women, and the highest ranked non-Chinese.

In August, Assaubayeva placed tied 3–4 at Cairns Cup alongside Carissa Yip, scoring 5 points (+2-1=6) with wins against Stavroula Tsolakidou and Alexandra Kosteniuk and the loss against eventual Champion Tan Zhongyi. Assaubayeva won the rapid section of WR Chess Tour (Europe leg), and finished 2nd in the blitz section, losing to Anna Muzychuk in the finals.

In September, Assaubayeva played board 1 for the Kazakhstan women's team that won the silver medal in the Women's event of the 46th Chess Olympiad. Kazakhstan went undefeated with 7 wins and 4 draws. Assaubayeva also was undefeated with 3 wins and 7 draws.

== Major achievements ==
Year	Championship	Category	Place	Result/Score	ref
2011	World Youth Chess Championship (U8 Girls)	Girl's Youth	(Brazil) Caldas Novas	(gold) Winner	
2011	World School Chess Championship (U7 Girls)	Girl's school	(Poland) Kraków	(gold) Winner	
2013	World School Chess Championship (U9 Girls)	Girl's School	(Greece) Porto Carras	(gold) Winner	
2014	World Youth Chess Championship (U10 Girls)	Girl's Youth	(South Africa) Durban	(silver) 2nd place	
2016	World Cadet Chess Championship (U12 Girls)	Girl's Youth	(Georgia (country)) Batumi	(gold) Winner	
2017	World Youth Chess Championship (U14 Girls)	Girl's Youth	(Uruguay) Montevideo	(silver) 2nd place	
2021	Women's World Rapid Chess Championship	Women's Senior	(Poland) Warsaw	(silver) 2nd place (9½/11)	
2021	Women's World Blitz Chess Championship	Women's Senior	(Poland) Warsaw	(gold) Winner (14/17)	
2022	Women's World Blitz Chess Championship	Women's Senior	(Kazakhstan) Almaty	(gold) Winner	
2024	45th Chess Olympiad (Women)	Team (Kazakhstan)	(Hungary) Budapest	(silver) 2nd place	
2025	2025 Women's Grand Swiss	Women's Senior	(Uzbekistan) Samarkand	(bronze) 3rd place	
2025	Women's World Blitz Chess Championship	Women's Senior	(Qatar) Doha	(gold) Winner	
2026	Women's Candidates Tournament	Women's Senior	(Cyprus) Pegeia	(silver) 2nd place (8/14)	
2026	Norway Chess Women	Women's Senior	(Norway) Oslo	(gold) Winner (16.5/30)	
2026	46th Chess Olympiad (Women)	Team (Kazakhstan)	(Uzbekistan) Samarkand	(silver) 2nd place	

== Online chess achievements ==
Year	Tournament	Platform	Score / Result	Reference
2021	Asian Women's Continental Online Chess Championship	Tornelo	Winner(7.5/9)	
2024	FIDE Swiss Queens Wednesday (21st Edition)	FIDE Online Arena	Winner	

== Controversies ==
=== Solozhenkin cheating claims ===
Russian grandmaster and coach Evgeniy Solozhenkin accused Assaubayeva on several internet articles of cheating during the World Youth U14 Championship in Uruguay in September 2017, claiming his daughter had heard her talking about her ongoing game during a toilet break. The FIDE Ethics Commission investigated the case and ultimately suspended Solozhenkin for making unsubstantiated allegations of cheating, citing an analysis of Kenneth W. Regan that showed no evidence of cheating.

A group of grandmasters wrote an open letter protesting against Solozhenkin's suspension, without giving an opinion about his accusations against Assaubayeva. Assaubayeva's family sued Solozhenkin for defamatory allegations made in public and in the media that offended Assaubayeva's honor and dignity. The Moscow Appellate Court ordered Solozhenkin to apologize, disavow his allegations to the media, delete the defamatory articles, and pay a compensatory sum of 100,000 rubles.

=== Unsolicited letters ===
In 2022 the investigative journalism outlet Meduza revealed that Assaubayeva was one of at least 15 female chess players who had received harassments in form of unsolicited letters containing used condoms and pornographic pictures from a resident in Riga, Latvia between 2009 and 2021. Assaubayeva was fourteen when she received such a letter in 2018, and several other recipients had also been minors. With the assistance of forensic experts and through searching the contents of data breaches, Meduza managed to pinpoint the identity of the sender to international master Andrejs Strebkovs. Although he was unable to be prosecuted under Latvian law, Strebkovs was subsequently banned from all FIDE events for 12 years, and had his International Master title revoked.

== Honours and awards ==
- Order of the Golden Mongoose – Awarded in September 2019 in Odesa, Ukraine, by the Mongoose Public Organization. She was selected by an international sports jury for her rapid ascent into elite chess and her impact as a youth role model.
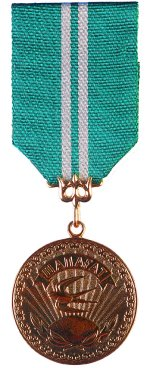
- апағат медалі, lit. 'Medal of Charity' – Awarded by presidential decree on 19 November 2019 in recognition of her early-career chess breakthroughs, promotion of sports education, and public inspiration to the country's youth.
- Order of the Leopard (II Degree), honoured by President Kassym-Jomart Tokayev on 30 December 2025.
