= Divya Deshmukh =

Indian chess grandmaster (born 2005)

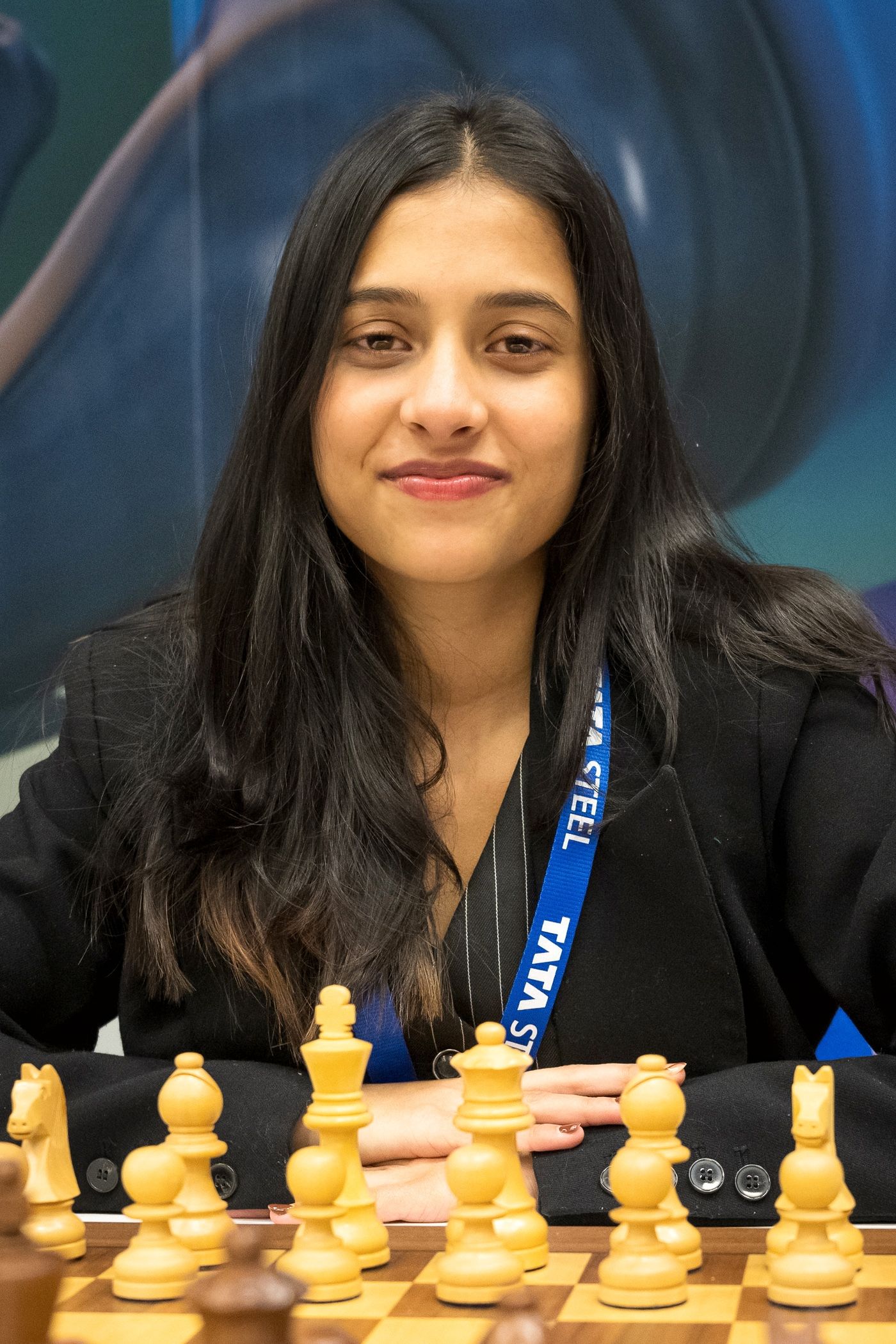
- Deshmukh in 2025

Personal information
- Born: 9 December 2005 (age 20) Nagpur, Maharashtra, India

Chess career
- Country: India
- Title: Grandmaster (2025)
- FIDE rating: 2488 (November 2026)
- Peak rating: 2510 (April 2026)

Divya Deshmukh (born 9 December 2005) is an Indian chess grandmaster. She has won two gold medals, one silver medal and two bronze medals at the Women's Chess Olympiad. Deshmukh won the Women's Chess World Cup 2025 and qualified for the Grandmaster title becoming the eighth woman to obtain the title as a teenager. She has also won golds at the Asian Championship, the World Junior Championship and the World Youth Championship. She won the women's edition of National Premier Chess Championship in both 2021 and 2022 consecutively.

== Early life ==
Deshmukh was born on 9 December 2005 in Nagpur, Maharashtra, India. Her parents Namrata and Jitendra Deshmukh are both doctors. She has an elder sister. She studied at Bhavan's Bhagwandas Purohit Vidya Mandir during her schooling days.

== Career ==
Deshmukh won the 2013 National Under-9 Girls' Championship in Chennai.

=== 2020–2023: Early rise ===
In 2020, Deshmukh was part of the gold medal-winning Indian team at the FIDE Online Chess Olympiad. In 2022, she won the National Women's Chess Championship. She won an individual bronze medal at the 2022 Women's Chess Olympiad.

In 2023, she won the Asian Continental Women, going undefeated with the score 7½/9 (+6-0=3).

In September 2023, Deshmukh won the rapid section of Tata Steel Chess India with a score of 7/9, despite being the lowest-rated player in the field. During the tournament, she defeated Harika Dronavalli, Vantika Agrawal, Koneru Humpy, Savitha Shri B, Irina Krush, and Nino Batsiashvili. She also drew against World Champion Ju Wenjun, and suffered her only loss to Polina Shuvalova.

=== 2024: Olympiad double gold ===
In January, Deshmukh played in the Challengers-section, in the Tata Steel Chess Tournament 2024. In May, Deshmukh was the winner of Sharjah Challengers, a large open tournament win that earned her a spot in the Sharjah Masters the following year.

In June, she became the 2024 World U20 Chess Champion. She became the fourth Indian to win the title after Humpy Koneru in 2001, Harika Dronavalli in 2008, and Soumya Swaminathan in 2009. Needing a win in the final round, she was the victor against Bulgaria's third seed Beloslava Krasteva in a five-hour marathon battle to secure 10 points and won the gold.

At the 45th Chess Olympiad in September, Deshmukh was part of the Indian team that won gold medal in the Women's section in Budapest. She helped team India win the gold medal, scoring 9.5/11 on Board 3 with a performance rating of 2608. She also earned an individual gold medal for the best performance on her board.

=== 2025: World Cup and Grandmaster title ===
In January, Deshmukh finished 12th in the Challengers-section of the Tata Steel Chess Tournament 2025. In June, she played for the Hexamind Chess Team at the World Rapid and Blitz Team Chess Championships held in London. In the blitz semifinals she defeated women's world no. 1 Hou Yifan in a 74-move rook-vs-bishop endgame. This was one of her 6 wins across 8 blitz games, earning her a performance rating of 2606 and the team won bronze medal in the blitz event. The team also won the silver in the rapid section, where she scored 8 out of 12 points with a performance rating of 2420, winning individual bronze.

Deshmukh was seeded 15th in the Women's Chess World Cup 2025. She defeated 2nd seed Zhu Jiner 2.5–1.5 in the fourth round, 10th seed Harika Dronavalli 3–1 in the quarterfinals, and 3rd seed Tan Zhongyi 1.5–0.5 in the semifinals. In the final, she defeated 4th seed Koneru Humpy 2.5–1.5 to win the tournament. With this win, she earned the grandmaster title, which is directly awarded to the winner of the World Cup without requiring the usual three norms. She became India's 88th grandmaster and the fourth Indian woman to become a grandmaster. Additionally, she qualified for the Women's Candidates Tournament 2026.

Deshmukh participated in the open section of FIDE Grand Swiss Tournament 2025 as the 115th seed of 116 players. She finished 81st with a score of 5/11 (+2-3=6), winning games against Bassem Amin and Velimir Ivić. She drew the reigning World Chess Champion Gukesh Dommaraju in round 8.

Divya played for Cercle d'échecs de Monte-Carlo team in the European Chess Club Cup, the team won gold medal and she won the gold medal for board 2 with the score 4.5/6.

Deshmukh received a presidential nominee for the Chess World Cup 2025, she was eliminated in the first round by GM Stamatis Kourkoulos-Arditis.

=== 2026: Candidates and Invitationals ===
Deshmukh participated in Challenger section of Prague International Chess Festival. She finished 3rd with two wins and one loss.

Deshmukh participated in Women's Candidates Tournament, she was tied for 1st with four other players after 8 rounds, but lost 4 and drew 2 of the remaining 6 games to finish on 7th with the score 5½/14.

In May–June Deshmukh participated in Norway Chess Women, she defeated Zhu Jiner in round 5 to find herself in sole lead, but lost her 6th-round game to World Champion Ju Wenjun, she played leader Bibisara Assaubayeva in round 8 and had a promising position but blundered under time pressure to lose, She consecutively lost the next two rounds to finish on 5th place. She was part of the Hexamind Chess Team that won bronze in the World Rapid Team Chess Championships. In August, she finished tied 5-7th at Cairns Cup scoring wins against Vaishali R and Alexandra Kosteniuk and losing to tournament leaders Tan Zhongyi and Alice Lee.

In September, Deshmukh was part of the Indian women's team that won the bronze medal in the Women's event of the 46th Chess Olympiad, she won individual silver on board 3 with performance rating of 2464 and score 6½/10 (+4=5-1). She was awarded the FIDE excellence award: "Best Chess Player (Female)".

== Performance record ==
Women's Chess World Cup 2025
Seed	Name	Game 1	Game 2	Tiebreaker 1	Tiebreaker 2	Total
15	(India) Divya Deshmukh	½	½	½	1	2½
4	(India) Humpy Koneru	½	½	½	0	1½

Legend
Women's Classical international and national individual and team tournaments
Women's Tournaments organized by FIDE (Olympiads, World Cups, Grand Swiss, Candidates Tournaments, Grand Prix, World Championships)
Non classical (rapid, blitz and online)
Open Tournaments (Note: Includes closed tournaments with male players)

TPR (Tournament Performance ratings) of FIDE-rated events calculated according to FIDE.

Tournament results
Year	City	Tournament	Time control	Wins	Losses	Draws	Points	Place	TPR
2026
2026	Samarkand	46th Chess Olympiad, Women's event	Team Classical (Board 3)	7 4	1 1	3 5	8½/11 6½/10	3rd Silver	— 2464
2026	Bengaluru	Global Chess League	Rapid	0	4	8	4/12	2nd (team)	–
2026	St. Louis	Cairns Cup	Classical	2	2	5	4½/9	5-7	2490
2026	Chess.com	Women's Speed Chess Championship	Blitz & Bullet	21	9	4	23/34	5-8	–
2026	Hong Kong	FIDE World Rapid and Blitz Team Chess Championship, Hexamind Chess Team	Rapid Blitz	3	1	3	4½/7	3rd (Team) 4th (Team)	2422
2026	Oslo	Norway Chess Women	Classical Armageddon	1 4	4 1	5 –	10/30	5th	2427
2026	Pegeia	Women's Candidates Tournament	Classical	2	5	7	5½/14	7th	2443
2026	Prague	Prague Challengers	Classical	2	1	6	5/9	3rd	2601
2026	Kolkata	Tata Steel Chess India	Rapid Blitz	2 6	2 7	5 5	4½/9 8½/18	3rd 7th	2366 2324
2025
2025	Doha	Women's World Rapid	Rapid	5	1	5	7½/11	8th	2435
2025	Doha	Women's World Blitz	Blitz	8	4	3	9½/15	22nd	2346
2025	Goa	Chess World Cup 2025	Classical	0	2	0	0/2	128-206	–
2025	Rhodes	European Chess Club Cup, Cercle d'échecs de Monte-Carlo (Team)	Team Classical (Board 2)	6 3	0 0	1 3	6½/7 4½/6	1st Gold	– 2591
2025	Samarkand	FIDE Grand Swiss 2025	Classical	2	3	6	5/11	81st	2613
2025	Chess.com	Women's Speed Chess Championship	Blitz & Bullet	16	10	7	19½/33	5-8	–
2025	Batumi	Women's Chess World Cup 2025	Classical Rapid (15+10)	4 4	1 0	7 2	7½/12 5/6	Winner	2627
2025	London	FIDE World Rapid and Blitz Team Chess Championship, Hexamind Chess Team	Rapid Blitz	5	1	6	8/12	2nd (Team) 3rd (Team)	2419
2025	Sharjah	Sharjah Masters 2025	Classical	1	3	5	3½/9	68th	2408
2025	Pune	FIDE Women's Grand Prix 2024-25	Classical	4	2	3	5½/9	3rd	2533
2025	Nicosia	FIDE Women's Grand Prix 2024-25	Classical	1	2	6	4/9	7th	2441
2025	Prague	Prague Challengers	Classical	2	5	2	3/9	7th	2441
2025	Wijk aan Zee	Tata Steel Challengers	Classical	2	8	3	3½/13	12th	2376
2024
2024	New York	Women's World Rapid	Rapid	6	3	2	7/11	21st	2341
2024	New York	Women's World Blitz	Blitz	6	3	2	7/11	18th	2363
2024	Kolkata	Tata Steel Chess India	Rapid Blitz	2 6	4 9	3 3	3½/9 7½/18	7th 9th	2407 2338
2024	Shymkent	FIDE Women's Grand Prix 2024-25	Classical	1	1	7	4½/9	5-6	2474
2024	Vrnjacka Banja	European Chess Club Cup, Garuda Ajka BSK (Team)	Team Classical (Board 2)	5 1	1 1	1 4	5½/7 3/6	2nd 4th	– 2405
2024	Budapest	45th Chess Olympiad, Women's event	Team Classical (Board 3)	9 8	1 0	1 2	9½/11 9/11	1st Gold	— 2608
2024	Abu Dhabi	Abu Dhabi Masters	Classical	4	1	4	6/9	27th	2562
2024	Gandhinagar	World Junior Girls Championship	Classical	9	0	2	10/11	Winner	2520
2024	Sharjah	Sharjah Challengers	Classical	5	0	4	7/9	Winner	2584
2024	Menorca	Menorca Open	Classical	4	3	2	5/9	84th	2365
2024	Grenke	Grenke Open	Classical	6	1	2	7/9	31-33	2585
2024	Djerba	Djerba Chess Festival	Classical	0	4	3	1½/7	8th	2383
2024	Wijk aan Zee	Tata Steel Challengers	Classical	3	7	3	4½/13	12th	2471
2023
2023	(Uzbekistan) Samarkand	Women's World Rapid Women's World Blitz	Rapid Blitz	6 9	4 4	1 4	6½/11 11/17	31st 13th	2246 2380
2023	Doha	Qatar Masters 2023	Classical	4	3	2	5/9	61st	2498
2023	Bydgoszcz	Women's World Team Chess Championship	Team Rapid (Board 3)	2 2	3 1	0 1	4/10 2½/4	5th –	–
2023	Kolkata	Tata Steel Chess India	Rapid Blitz	6 8	1 5	2 5	7/9 10½/18	1st 4th	2618 2405
2023	Abu Dhabi	Abu Dhabi Masters	Classical	3	4	2	4/9	90th	2473
2023	Astana	Astana Zhuldyzdary tournament	Classical	4	4	2	5/10	52nd	2312
2023	(India) Ahmedabad	National Premier Chess Championship	Classical	7	3	1	7½/11	8th	2075
2023	(Kazakhstan) Almaty	Women's Asian Individual Chess Championship	Classical	6	0	3	7½/9	1st	2485
2023	(Azerbaijan) Baku	Baku Open	Classical	4	3	2	5/9	37th	2520
2023	(India) Coimbatore	National Women's Team Chess Championship	Team (AAI) Classical (Board 2)	6 7	0 0	1 0	6½/7 7/7	Winner Gold	- 2665
2022
2022	(India) Kolhapur	National Premier Chess Championship	Classical	8	0	3	9½/11	Winner	2416
2022	(Spain) Sitges	Sunway Sitges Chess Festival	Classical	5	2	3	6½/10	74th	2341
2022	(India) Raipur	Chhattisgarh Open Masters	Classical	4	4	1	4½/9	41st	2261
2022	Chennai	44th Chess Olympiad, Women's event	Team Classical (Board 5)	7 6	2 1	2 2	8/11 7/9	8th Bronze	— 2298
2022	(India) Pune	Maharashtra International Open	Classical	5	3	3	6½/11	36th	2317
2022	(India) Nashik	National Rapid and Blitz Chess Championship	Rapid Blitz	5 7	4 2	0 2	5/9 8/11	57th 14th	- -
2022	(India) Jalgaon	National Women's Team Chess Championship	Team (AAI) Classical (Board 2)	7 4	0 0	0 2	7/7 5/6	Winner Silver	- 2165
2022	(India) Delhi	Delhi International Open	Classical	6	3	1	6½/10	39th	2184
2018
2018	(Greece) Halkidiki	World Youth Chess Championship (Girls U14)	Classical	8	2	1	8½/11	3rd	–
2017
2017	(Brazil) Poços de Caldas	World Cadets Chess Championship (Girls U12)	Classical	8	0	3	9½/11	1st	–
2016
2016	(Georgia (country)) Batumi	World Cadet Chess Championship (Girls U12)	Classical	8	2	1	8½/11	3rd	–
2014
2014	(South Africa) Durban	World Youth Chess Championship (Girls U10)	Classical	9	0	2	10/11	1st	–
Year	City	Tournament	Time control	Wins	Losses	Draws	Points	Place	TPR

== Awards ==
Year	Award	Result	Ref.
2025	BBC Emerging player of the Year	Won	
2026	Arjuna Award	Won	
2026	FIDE Excellence Awards, Best Chess Player (Female)	Won	

== Notes ==
Awards and achievements
Preceded by P. V. Nandhidhaa	Women's Asian Chess Champion; 2023	Succeeded by Song Yuxin
Preceded by Bhakti Kulkarni	Indian Women's Chess Champion; 2022	Succeeded by Padmini Rout
Preceded by Candela Francisco	World Junior Champion (Girls); 2024	Succeeded by Anna Shukhman
Preceded by Aleksandra Goryachkina	World Cup Champion; 2025	Succeeded by -
