= Kateryna Lagno =

Russian chess grandmaster (born 1989)

- Катерина Лагно
- Lagno in 2019
- Born: Kateryna Oleksandrivna Lahno; 27 December 1989 (age 36); Lviv, Ukrainian SSR, Soviet Union
- Spouse(s): Robert Fontaine (m. 2009, divorced) Alexander Grischuk (m. 2014)
- Chess career
- Country: Ukraine (until 2014); Russia (since 2014)
- Title: Grandmaster (2007)
- FIDE rating: 2506 (September 2026)
- Peak rating: 2563 (October 2022)

Kateryna Oleksandrivna Lagno (Note: Ukrainian: Катерина Олександрівна Лагно, romanized: Kateryna Oleksandrivna Lahno; Russian: Екатерина Александровна Лагно, romanized: Yekaterina Aleksandrovna Lagno) (born 27 December 1989) is a Russian (Note: Since 2014, Lagno has represented Russia.) chess grandmaster. A chess prodigy, she earned the title of Woman Grandmaster (WGM) at the age of 12 years, four months and two days. In 2007, she was awarded the grandmaster title.

She is a twice European Women's Champion and won two team gold medals at the Women's Chess Olympiad, in 2006 and 2014, playing for Ukraine and Russia respectively. She also won team gold at the Women's World Team Championship in 2013 playing for the Ukrainian team and in 2017 and 2021 playing for the Russian team. Lagno won the Women's European Team Championship in 2013, 2015, 2017, 2019, 2021, playing for the Ukrainian team in 2013 and for the Russian team in all following championships. Lagno was the Women's Vice World Champion in 2018, Women's World Rapid Champion in 2014 and Women's World Blitz Champion in 2010, 2018 and 2019.

== Chess career ==
=== 1999–2005 ===
At junior level, she won the Girls Under 10 section of the World Youth Chess Championships in 1999 and the Girls Under 14 at the European Youth Chess Championships in 2001.

At age 12 in 2002, she became the youngest ever Woman Grandmaster; however, this record was surpassed by eleven-year-old Bodhana Sivanandan in 2026.

Lagno was nominated by FIDE president to play in the 64-player knockout Women's World Chess Championship 2004, where she was the fifth seed. She reached the third round and lost to eventual runner-up Ekaterina Kovalevskaya. At the age of 15 she won the 2005 European Individual Women's Championship, held in June in Chişinău, Moldova. Tied with Russian IM Nadezhda Kosintseva at the end of the 12th round with 9 points each, Lagno won both games of a two-game blitz tie-break playoff to win the championship. The following year, she won the women's super-tournament "North Urals Cup", attaining a grandmaster norm in the process.

=== 2008 ===
In May 2008, Lagno won the European Individual Women Chess Championships again in Plovdiv, by one-half point in the 11-round open tournament.

=== 2009 ===
In 2009, she played for the club "Spartak" that won the Russian team championship and the European Club Cup in Ohrid.

=== 2010 ===
In August 2010, Lagno became Women's World Blitz Champion. She finished third in the Grandmaster Group C of the Tata Steel Chess Tournament 2011 in Wijk aan Zee. At the 40th Chess Olympiad in Istanbul in 2012, she won the individual bronze medal for her performance on board one.

=== 2012 ===
In December 2012, Lagno tied for first with Hou Yifan, Humpy Koneru and Anna Muzychuk in the women's rapid chess event of the SportAccord World Mind Games in Beijing, taking the gold medal on tie-break score.

=== 2014 ===
In April 2014, Lagno won the Women's World Rapid Championship in Khanty-Mansiysk by tie-break over Alexandra Kosteniuk. On 11 July 2014, FIDE officially approved her transition from the Ukrainian Chess Federation to the Russian Chess Federation, as filed in March 2014.

=== 2016 ===
In 2016, Lagno won the gold medal in the women's blitz chess event of the IMSA Elite Mind Games in Huai'an, China.

=== 2018 ===
In November 2018, Lagno lost to world champion Ju Wenjun in the finals of the Women's World Championship. In December 2018, Lagno won the Women's World Blitz Chess Championship held in St. Petersburg without losing any games.

=== 2025 ===
She won the silver medal at FIDE Grand Swiss tournament for Women, finishing 8/11, qualifying for Women's Candidates Tournament 2026.

=== 2026 ===
Lagno participated in Women's Candidates Tournament 2026, She was in 1st place contention till the last round, but she lost to Vaishali R, who won the tournament at 8.5/14, Lagno ended the tournament on 6th place with the score 6.5/14.

== Personal life ==
Born in Lviv, Lagno grew up in the industrial and chess-friendly town Kramatorsk, later moving to Donetsk. She is half Russian and half Ukrainian.

On 25 February 2009, Lagno married Robert Fontaine, French chess grandmaster and TV reporter. The couple had a son together, but divorced several years later.

As of 2019, Lagno has four children, and is married to Russian grandmaster Alexander Grischuk.
