= Women's Chess World Cup =

Single-elimination major chess tournament

The Women's Chess World Cup is a women's major chess competition organized by FIDE.

== Winners and results ==
The initial iteration resembled the football World Cup with round-robin groups (of six players each) that fed into a knock-out.

Year	Dates	Host	Players	Winner	Runner-up	Third place	Fourth place
2000	1–13 Sep	Shenyang, China	24	(China) Xu Yuhua	(Ukraine) Natalia Zhukova	(Sweden) Natalia Zhukova, (Vietnam) Hoang Thanh Trang	
2002	9–22 Oct	Hyderabad, India	24	(China) Xu Yuhua	(Bulgaria) Antoaneta Stefanova	(Russia) Svetlana Matveeva, (India) Humpy Koneru	

The recent iteration continued the format of the Women's World Championship knock-out tournaments, but with more players.

"Qual" refers to the number of players who qualify for the Candidates Tournament based on the World Cup results (marked with green background) other than players who have otherwise qualified before the start of World Cup (marked with purple background). For example, in 2021, the top 4 finishers qualified for the Women's Candidates Tournament 2022–23 including Aleksandra Goryachkina who qualified as the 2020 World Championship runner-up.

Year	Dates	Host	Players	Qual.	Winner	Runner-up	Third place	Fourth place
2021	12 Jul – 3 Aug	Sochi, Russia	103	3	(Russia) Alexandra Kosteniuk	(Russia) Aleksandra Goryachkina	(China) Tan Zhongyi	(Ukraine) Anna Muzychuk
2023	29 Jul – 22 Aug	Baku, Azerbaijan	103	2	(FIDE) Aleksandra Goryachkina	(Bulgaria) Nurgyul Salimova	(Ukraine) Anna Muzychuk	(China) Tan Zhongyi
2025	5 Jul – 29 Jul	(Georgia (country)) Batumi, Georgia	107	3	(India) Divya Deshmukh	(India) Koneru Humpy	(China) Tan Zhongyi	(China) Lei Tingjie

== See also ==
- Chess World Cup
- FIDE Women's Grand Swiss Tournament
