= Women's World Chess Championship 2025 =

Chess match between Ju Wenjun and Tan Zhongyi

- Shanghai & Chongqing, China
- 1–16 April 2025
	Defending champion	Challenger
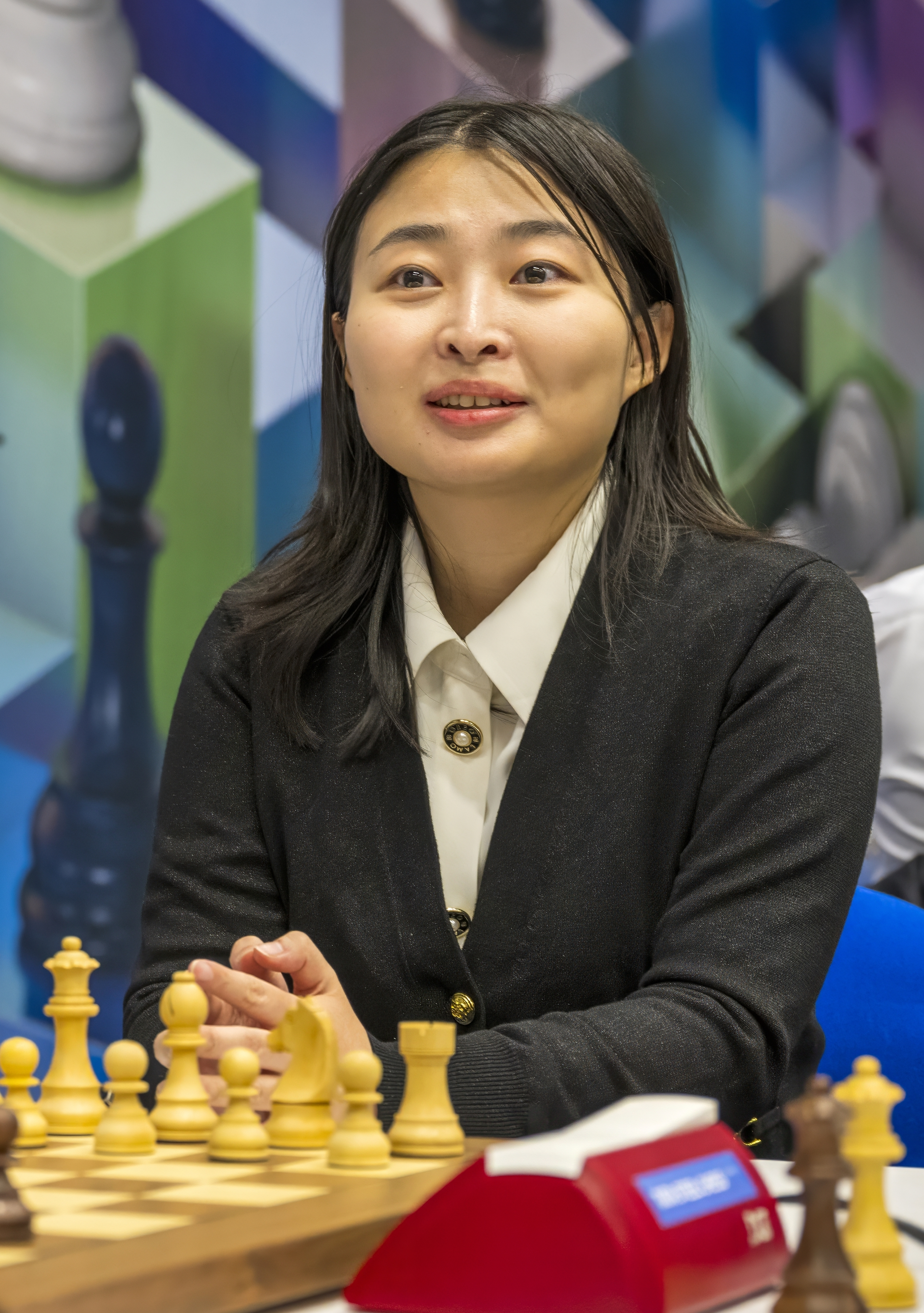
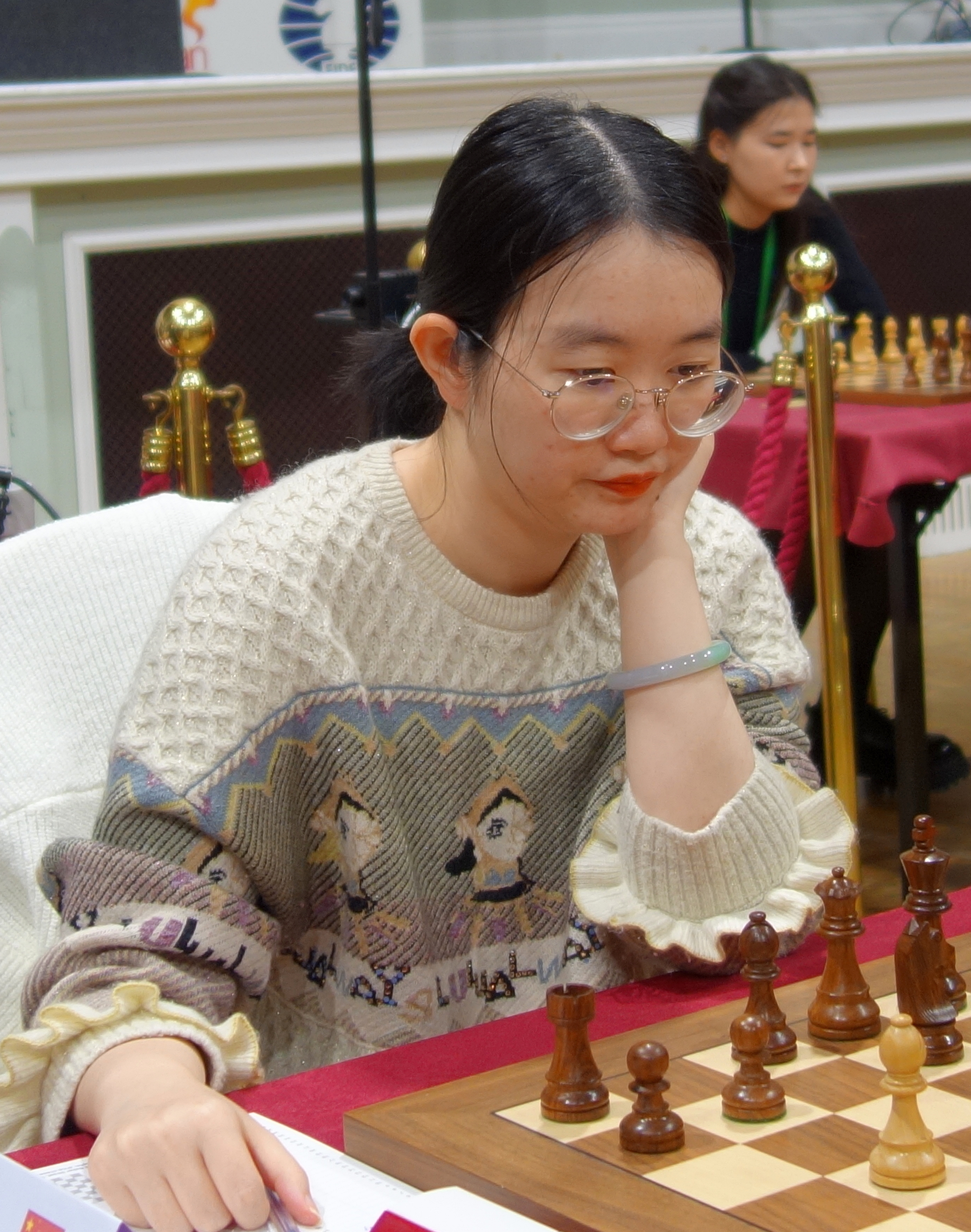
	(China) Ju Wenjun	(China) Tan Zhongyi
	6½	Scores	2½
Game 1	½	39 move draw	½
Game 2	0	67 moves →	1
Game 3	1	← 87 moves	0
Game 4	½	80 move draw	½
Game 5	1	← 59 moves	0
Game 6	1	← 52 moves	0
Game 7	1	← 47 moves	0
Game 8	1	← 53 moves	0
Game 9	½	38 move draw	½
Game 10	Not required
Game 11	Not required
Game 12	Not required
	Born 31 January 1991; 34 years old	Born 29 May 1991; 33 years old
	Winner of the Women's World Chess Championship 2023	Winner of the Women's Candidates Tournament 2024
	Rating: 2561 (World No. 2)	Rating: 2555 (World No. 4)

The Women's World Chess Championship 2025 was a match between Ju Wenjun, the current champion, and Tan Zhongyi, the winner of the Women's Candidates Tournament 2024. This was the third time the two players have met in a world chess championship: Tan eliminated Ju on the way to winning the Women's World Chess Championship 2017 when the championship was decided in a knockout tournament, while Ju won the Women's World Chess Championship 2018 (May), defeating Tan 5½–4½ to claim the title. In the 2025 match taking place from 3 to 16 April 2025, Ju defended her title after defeating Tan with a 6½–2½ scoreline, winning the world championship for the fifth time.

The match was played to a best of 12 games, with the first six games in Shanghai from 3 to 10 April, and the next six games, plus tiebreaks if required, scheduled in Chongqing from 13 to 21 April. It was split across the hometowns of the two players, following the tradition from the previous three matches. Per regulation, Ju won €300,000 while Tan took home €200,000.

== Candidates Tournament ==
The challenger, Tan Zhongyi, qualified by winning the Women's Candidates Tournament 2024, which was an eight-player double round-robin tournament. It took place from 3 April to 22 April 2024 in Toronto, Canada.

The eight players who competed were:

Qualification method	Player	Age	Rating	Rank
Qualification method	Player	(April 2024)		
2023 Women's World Championship runner-up	(China) Lei Tingjie	27	2550	4
The top two finishers in the Women's Grand; Prix 2022–23	(FIDE) Kateryna Lagno (Note: Russian players' flags are displayed as the FIDE flag, as FIDE banned Russian and Belarusian flags from FIDE-rated events in response to the Russian invasion of Ukraine.) (winner)	34	2542	6
The top two finishers in the Women's Grand; Prix 2022–23	(FIDE) Aleksandra Goryachkina (runner-up)	25	2553	3
The top three finishers in the Women's Chess World; Cup 2023 (Note: Aleksandra Goryachkina finished first in the Women's Chess World Cup 2023, but had already qualified for the Candidates through the FIDE Women's Grand Prix 2022–23. She is replaced by Koneru Humpy, who was the highest-rated player on the January 2024 FIDE rating list who had played a minimum of 30 games.)	(Bulgaria) Nurgyul Salimova (runner-up)	20	2432	36
The top three finishers in the Women's Chess World; Cup 2023	(Ukraine) Anna Muzychuk (third place)	34	2520	8
The top two finishers in the Women's Grand Swiss; 2023 (Note: Anna Muzychuk finished second in the Women's Grand Swiss 2023, but she had already qualified for the Candidates through the Women's Chess World Cup 2023. According to the regulations, the second spot for the Candidates via the Women's Grand Swiss was awarded to the highest finisher of the Grand Swiss who had not already qualified (3rd-place finisher Tan Zhongyi).)	(India) R Vaishali (winner)	22	2475	15
The top two finishers in the Women's Grand Swiss; 2023	(China) Tan Zhongyi (third place)	32	2521	7
Highest-rated active player for January 2024	(India) Koneru Humpy	37	2546	5

=== Results ===
Standings of the 2024 Candidates Tournament
Rank	Player	Score	SB	Wins	Qualification	TZ		KH		LT		VR		AG		KL		NS		AM	
1	Tan Zhongyi (CHN)	9 / 14	60.5	5	Advanced to title match			½	½	0	1	1	1	½	½	1	½	½	½	1	½
2 (Note: SB scores)	Koneru Humpy (IND)	7.5 / 14	52.25	3		½	½			0	1	1	½	½	½	½	½	1	0	½	½
3	Lei Tingjie (CHN)	7.5 / 14	52	4		0	1	0	1			1	0	½	1	½	½	½	½	½	½
4	Vaishali Rameshbabu (IND)	7.5 / 14	47.5	6		0	0	½	0	1	0			1	½	0	1	1	1	½	1
5	Aleksandra Goryachkina (FIDE)	7 / 14	47	2		½	½	½	½	0	½	½	0			½	½	½	1	1	½
6	Kateryna Lagno (FIDE)	6.5 / 14	45	1		½	0	½	½	½	½	0	1	½	½			½	½	½	½
7 (Note: SB scores)	Nurgyul Salimova (BUL)	5.5 / 14	39.5	1		½	½	1	0	½	½	0	0	0	½	½	½			½	½
8	Anna Muzychuk (UKR)	5.5 / 14	38.75	0		½	0	½	½	½	½	0	½	½	0	½	½	½	½		

Tie-breakers for first place: (1) results in tie-break games for first place;

Tie breakers for non-first place: (1) results in tie-break games for first place, if any; (2) Sonneborn–Berger score (SB); (3) total number of wins; (4) head-to-head score among tied players; (5) drawing of lots.

Note: Numbers in the crosstable in a white background indicate the result playing the respective opponent with the white pieces (black pieces if on a black background). This does not give information which of the two games was played in the first half of the tournament, and which in the second.

== Match ==
=== Seconds ===
Ju's seconds were Ni Hua and Maxim Matlakov, while Tan's seconds were Jeffery Xiong, Xu Xiangyu and Zhou Weiqi.

=== Results ===
Women's World Chess Championship 2025
	Rating	Classical games												Points
	Rating	1	2	3	4	5	6	7	8	9	10	11	12	Points
Ju Wenjun (CHN)	2561	½	0	1	½	1	1	1	1	½	—N/a			6½
Tan Zhongyi (CHN)	2555	½	1	0	½	0	0	0	0	½	—N/a			2½

=== Games ===
==== Game 1: Ju–Tan, ½–½ ====
Ju–Tan, game 1

Position: a8 black rook, c8 black bishop, f8 black rook, g8 black king, e7 black queen, f7 black pawn, e6 black pawn, g6 black pawn, h6 black pawn, a5 black pawn, d5 black pawn, c4 white pawn, e3 white queen, a2 white pawn, b2 white pawn, d2 white knight, f2 white pawn, g2 white pawn, h2 white pawn, d1 white rook, f1 white rook, g1 white king

Position after 18.Qe3. White attacks both the d5-pawn and the h6-pawn. With 18...Qg5!, Black accepts doubled pawns in return for exchanging queens. Although this maneuver also gave Black an isolated pawn on d5, with 21...Rb8 and 23...a4, Tan was able to muster enough activity to stop Ju from ever exploiting the weakness.

Ju Wenjun drew the white pieces for the first round. She played 1.e4, and Tan responded with the Sicilian Defense. Ju went for an uncommon line with 5.Bd3 and 7.Bf4, but Tan responded well. Ju had the chance to play a more complicated position, but opted not to take too much risk, and following 18...Qg5! the game fizzled into a draw.

1. e4 c5 2. Nf3 e6 3. d4 cxd4 4. Nxd4 Nf6 5. Bd3 Nc6 6. Nxc6 bxc6 7. Bf4 d5 8. Nd2 g6 9. Bg5 h6 10. Bh4 Be7 11. 0-0 a5 12. Qe2 0-0 13. Rad1 Nd7 14. Bxe7 Qxe7 15. c4 Ne5 16. exd5 Nxd3 17. Qxd3 cxd5 18. Qe3 Qg5 19. Qxg5 hxg5 20. cxd5 exd5 21. Rfe1 Rb8 22. b3 g4 23. Nf1 a4 24. bxa4 Rb4 25. a5 Ra4 26. Rxd5 Be6 27. Rc5 Rxa2 28. Ne3 Ra8 29. Nd5 R8xa5 30. Rxa5 Rxa5 31. Nf4 Bf5 32. h3 gxh3 33. Nxh3 Bxh3 34. gxh3 Kg7 35. Kg2 Rg5+ 36. Kf3 Rf5+ 37. Kg2 Rg5+ 38. Kf3 Rf5+ 39. Kg2 ½–½

==== Game 2: Tan–Ju, 1–0 ====
Tan–Ju, game 2

Position: f8 black king, b7 white rook, f7 black pawn, g7 black pawn, h6 black pawn, b5 black pawn, d4 white pawn, f3 black rook, g3 white pawn, e2 white king, f2 white pawn, h2 white pawn

Position after 38.Ke2. Although objectively still drawn, 38...Rf5? left Black's rook and king both in passive positions, making the defense harder. After 39.Ke3 h5 40.f4, threatening Ke4 followed by d4–d5 and Rxb5, the only saving move was 40...b4! freeing the rook for lateral operations (...Ra5–a2).

In her first game with the white pieces, Tan played the English Opening, but achieved no more than a symbolic (albeit risk-free) advantage. Piece trades turned a tense middlegame into a quiet rook endgame, which looked like a dead draw. However, even drawn endgames have their subtleties. Some inaccurate play by Ju left her in a progressively more difficult-to-defend position (diagram), before 40...Ke8?? on the fateful 40th move (just before the time control) led to a lost endgame. Tan showed excellent technique to convert smoothly.

1. c4 Nf6 2. Nc3 e5 3. Nf3 Nc6 4. g3 d5 5. cxd5 Nxd5 6. Bg2 Bc5 7. 0-0 0-0 8. d3 h6 9. Nxd5 Qxd5 10. Bd2 Qd6 11. Bc3 Qe7 12. Nd2 Nd4 13. e3 Nb5 14. a4 Nxc3 15. bxc3 c6 16. a5 Bd7 17. Qb3 Rab8 18. Ne4 Bd6 19. Nxd6 Qxd6 20. d4 b6 21. axb6 axb6 22. Ra7 Be6 23. Qa4 Rfc8 24. Rb1 Bd5 25. dxe5 Qxe5 26. Qd4 Qxd4 27. exd4 Bxg2 28. Kxg2 b5 29. Re1 Ra8 30. Ree7 Rxa7 31. Rxa7 c5 32. Kf3 cxd4 33. cxd4 Kf8 34. Rb7 Rc3+ 35. Ke4 Rc2 36. Ke3 Rc3+ 37. Kd2 Rf3 38. Ke2 Rf5 39. Ke3 h5 40. f4 Ke8 41. Ke4 Rf6 42. Rxb5 g6 43. d5 Ra6 44. Ke5 f6+ 45. Kd4 Ra2 46. Kc5 Rxh2 47. Rb8+ Kd7 48. Rb7+ Kc8 49. Rg7 g5 50. f5 h4 51. gxh4 gxh4 52. Rh7 h3 53. Kd6 Kb8 54. Kd7 Kb7 55. d6 Kb6 56. Kd8 Rh1 57. d7 h2 58. Rh3 Kb7 59. Rb3+ Ka7 60. Rb2 Ka6 61. Re2 Kb7 62. Ke7 1–0

==== Game 3: Ju–Tan, 1–0 ====
Ju–Tan, game 3

Position: c7 black king, f7 black pawn, e6 black bishop, g6 black pawn, c5 white pawn, h5 black pawn, b4 white rook, d4 white bishop, h4 white pawn, e3 white king, g3 white pawn, a2 black rook, f2 white pawn

Position after 59.c5. Tan's 59...Bd5?! is a clear inaccuracy since it allows the white king to advance. Instead 59...Bd7!, threatening to exchange rooks with ...Ra4, would have made it harder for White to advance the king, e.g. 60.Ke4 Bc6+ 61.Ke5 Ra4! 62.Rb3 (exchanging rooks is an immediate opposite-color bishop draw) f6+! wins the d4-bishop.

In a reversal of game 2, Ju ground down her opponent to win game 3. Out of another Sicilian Defense, Ju emerged out of a tense middlegame with a small advantage thanks to her bishop pair. She eventually converted this to a pawn-up endgame, albeit one that is still objectively drawn because of opposite-color bishops. Nonetheless, the rooks on the board meant White could press for a win, while Black could only sit passively and defend for many moves. After keeping the balance for over 15 moves, Tan eventually cracked on move 60, and Ju converted.

1. e4 c5 2. Nf3 e6 3. c4 Nc6 4. d4 cxd4 5. Nxd4 Bb4+ 6. Nc3 Nge7 7. Be2 d5 8. exd5 exd5 9. Nxc6 bxc6 10. 0-0 0-0 11. cxd5 cxd5 12. Bf3 Be6 13. Bg5 Bxc3 14. bxc3 Rc8 15. Qa4 h6 16. Bd2 a5 17. Rfe1 Rc4 18. Qa3 Nf5 19. Be2 Rc8 20. Rad1 Qd6 21. Qxa5 Ra8 22. Qb4 Rxa2 23. Bf4 Qc6 24. Bb5 Qb6 25. Re2 Rfa8 26. Bd3 Ra1 27. Ree1 Rxd1 28. Rxd1 Qd8 29. h3 Qf6 30. Re1 Rc8 31. Be5 Qg5 32. Ba6 Ra8 33. Bf4 Qf6 34. Bb7 Rd8 35. Bc7 Rf8 36. Rd1 Qg5 37. Bxd5 Ne3 38. h4 Qg4 39. Qxg4 Bxg4 40. Rd3 Nxd5 41. Rxd5 Ra8 42. Bb6 Be6 43. Rd6 Kf8 44. Bd4 Ke7 45. Rb6 g6 46. Kh2 h5 47. Kg3 Ra5 48. Kf4 Kd7 49. g3 Rf5+ 50. Ke3 Ra5 51. Rb4 Bd5 52. Bb6 Ra3 53. Kd4 Be6 54. Bc5 Ra2 55. Kd3 Bf5+ 56. Ke3 Be6 57. Bd4 Kc6 58. c4 Kc7 59. c5 Bd5 60. Kf4 Bc6 61. Kg5 Ra4 62. Be5+ Kd7 63. Rb2 Ke6 64. Bf4 Rc4 65. Be3 Ke5 66. Rb8 Bd7 67. Rd8 Be6 68. Rd6 Rc2 69. Kh6 Kf6 70. Rd1 Rc4 71. Rd6 Rc2 72. Bd4+ Kf5 73. f3 Rc4 74. c6 Rc2 75. Kg7 g5 76. hxg5 Kxg5 77. Bb6 Kf5 78. c7 Rc3 79. Ba5 Rc5 80. Ra6 Rc4 81. Kf8 Bd5 82. Ke7 h4 83. Rf6+ Ke5 84. gxh4 Be6 85. h5 Rc5 86. h6 Bc8 87. h7 1–0

==== Game 4: Tan–Ju, ½–½ ====
Tan–Ju, game 4

Position: a8 black rook, d8 black queen, f8 black rook, g8 black king, f7 black pawn, g7 black pawn, h7 black pawn, b6 black pawn, c6 black knight, e6 black bishop, b5 black pawn, d5 black pawn, f4 white bishop, b3 white queen, g3 white pawn, a2 white pawn, b2 white pawn, f2 white pawn, g2 white bishop, h2 white pawn, c1 white rook, d1 white rook, g1 white king

Position after 21.Qb3. With the bishop pair and Black's shattered queenside, White has a pleasant advantage. However, 21...Ne7 22.Qxb5 Rxa2 23.Bc7 Qa8 24.Bd6? missed the defensive resource 24...Ra5! 25.Qxb6?! Nc8! and Black survives. Tan chose 25.Qb4 instead, but Ju had stabilized the position.

In a tough game, Tan put Ju under heavy pressure, but Ju was able to defend her way to a draw. Similar to games 1–3, the game left well-trodden territory quickly. Ju took some risks with 10...d5, offering the pawn, but Tan did not accept the sacrifice. Instead, she offered her own pawn with 18.Bf4, a move that was objectively not ideal, but it confused Ju, who faltered with 19...Nb5?. Tan had the opportunity to simplify into an endgame where her outside passed pawn and bishop pair would've given her excellent winning chances, but she missed that 25.Qxb6 Nc8! saves the game for Black. Although she had objectively lost her advantage, the endgame still offered White scope to play for a win, which Tan duly did, but Ju defended accurately to draw.

1. c4 e6 2. Nc3 Bb4 3. Qb3 Ba5 4. g3 c5 5. Bg2 Nc6 6. e3 Nge7 7. Nge2 0-0 8. 0-0 a6 9. d4 cxd4 10. exd4 d5 11. cxd5 exd5 12. Be3 Bxc3 13. Nxc3 Na5 14. Qb4 Nac6 15. Qc5 b6 16. Qa3 Be6 17. Rac1 Nf5 18. Bf4 Nfxd4 19. Rfd1 Nb5 20. Nxb5 axb5 21. Qb3 Ne7 22. Qxb5 Rxa2 23. Bc7 Qa8 24. Bd6 Ra5 25. Qb4 Ra4 26. Qb3 Ra7 27. Rc7 Rxc7 28. Bxc7 Qc6 29. Qxb6 Qc2 30. Bf3 Bf5 31. Bf4 Be4 32. Rc1 Qd3 33. Bxe4 Qxe4 34. Qe3 Qxe3 35. Bxe3 f6 36. Rc7 Nf5 37. Bc5 Rd8 38. Kf1 Nd6 39. b4 Ne4 40. Bb6 Rb8 41. Ba5 Rb5 42. Ke2 Nd6 43. Ra7 Nc4 44. Kd3 Ne5+ 45. Kc2 d4 46. Kb3 Rd5 47. Bb6 d3 48. Ra1 Nf3 49. Rd1 Kf7 50. Kc3 d2 51. Be3 Ke6 52. Bxd2 Nxh2 53. Re1+ Kd7 54. Be3 Ng4 55. Bc5 Ne5 56. Ra1 Ke6 57. f4 Nd7 58. Re1+ Kf5 59. Kc4 Rd2 60. Re7 Nxc5 61. bxc5 g5 62. fxg5 fxg5 63. Rxh7 Rc2+ 64. Kd4 Rd2+ 65. Kc4 Rc2+ 66. Kb5 Rc3 67. c6 Rxg3 68. c7 Rc3 69. Kb6 Kf4 70. Rf7+ Ke4 71. Rg7 Kf4 72. Rg6 Rxc7 73. Kxc7 g4 74. Kd6 g3 75. Kd5 Kf3 76. Kd4 g2 77. Kd3 Kf2 78. Rf6+ Ke1 79. Rg6 Kf2 80. Rxg2+ Kxg2 ½–½

==== Game 5: Ju–Tan, 1–0 ====
Ju–Tan, game 5

Position: a8 black rook, c8 black bishop, d8 black queen, e8 black king, h8 black rook, a7 black bishop, b7 black pawn, d7 black pawn, e7 black knight, f7 black pawn, g7 black pawn, h7 black pawn, a6 black pawn, e6 black pawn, c5 white pawn, e5 black knight, e4 white pawn, b3 white knight, c3 white knight, d3 white bishop, a2 white pawn, b2 white pawn, f2 white pawn, g2 white pawn, h2 white pawn, a1 white rook, c1 white bishop, d1 white queen, f1 white rook, g1 white king

Position after 10.c5. Black should have gone for 10...b6 to challenge White's strong c5-pawn, when 11.cxb6 Bxb6 12.Be2 gives Black a playable position thanks to her extra central pawn. Instead 10...N7g6?! and 11...b5? left the c5-pawn entrenched, where it would eventually contribute decisively to White winning the endgame.

Position: b8 black bishop, e8 black rook, h8 black king, b7 black queen, d7 black pawn, g7 black pawn, h7 black pawn, e6 black rook, g6 black knight, c5 white pawn, f5 black pawn, a4 white pawn, c4 white queen, d4 white bishop, f4 white pawn, b3 white knight, c3 white pawn, h3 white pawn, f2 white rook, g2 white pawn, f1 white rook, g1 white king

Position after 26.Raf1. White has two extra pawns, against which Black has no compensation. Tan went for 26...Nxf4, hoping to open up White's king position for her major pieces, but Ju defended successfully.

Ju won the fifth game after successfully escaping Tan's opening preparation. Out of a Sicilian Kan, Tan went for the very rare move 9...Ne5!? against which Ju played 10.c5?!. Although not objectively the best move, it did get Tan to start thinking. She responded poorly with 10...N7g6?! and 11...b5?, giving Ju a commanding position. Ju missed 16.Qd4! with a near-decisive advantage, instead playing 16.Qe2?!, upon which Tan's position became tenable again. This lasted only until Tan lashed out with 17...f5?, however, after which her position went downhill. This time Ju did not falter, and in spite of Tan's best efforts to confuse matters, Ju converted her position up two pawns.

1. e4 c5 2. Nf3 e6 3. d4 cxd4 4. Nxd4 a6 5. Bd3 Bc5 6. Nb3 Ba7 7. 0-0 Ne7 8. c4 Nbc6 9. Nc3 Ne5 10. c5 N7g6 11. Be2 b5 12. f4 Nc4 13. a4 b4 14. Bxc4 bxc3 15. bxc3 Bb7 16. Qe2 0-0 17. Bd3 f5 18. exf5 exf5 19. Be3 Qc7 20. Bxa6 Rfe8 21. Bxb7 Qxb7 22. Qc4+ Kh8 23. Bd4 Re6 24. h3 Rae8 25. Rf2 Bb8 26. Raf1 Nxf4 27. Rxf4 Bxf4 28. Rxf4 Re1+ 29. Rf1 Rxf1+ 30. Kxf1 Qe4 31. Kg1 Qb1+ 32. Kh2 Re1 33. Qd5 h6 34. Nd2 Rh1+ 35. Kg3 Qe1+ 36. Bf2 Qe2 37. Qd4 Rd1 38. Be3 Kh7 39. a5 Re1 40. Bf2 Rd1 41. Be3 Re1 42. Nc4 Ra1 43. Nd6 Ra2 44. Bf2 Qe6 45. Qf4 Kg6 46. Kh2 Qf6 47. Nc4 Kh7 48. Bd4 Qe6 49. Nd6 Qg6 50. Qf3 f4 51. a6 Rxa6 52. Qxf4 Ra2 53. Qf3 Qe6 54. Nf5 g5 55. Ne3 d6 56. c6 Ra8 57. Nd5 Rc8 58. Qd3+ Kg8 59. Ne7+ 1–0

==== Game 6: Tan–Ju, 0–1 ====
Tan–Ju, game 6

Position: a8 black rook, f8 black rook, g8 black king, a7 black pawn, b7 black pawn, e7 black bishop, f7 black pawn, g7 black pawn, h7 black pawn, e6 black queen, f6 black knight, c5 black pawn, e5 white bishop, a3 white knight, b3 white pawn, e3 white pawn, f3 white queen, g3 white pawn, a2 white pawn, f2 white pawn, g2 white king, h2 white pawn, a1 white rook, f1 white rook

Position after 16...Qe6. White needed to give up the bishop with the counterintuitive 17.Bxf6!, exchanging a bishop for a knight in an open position, because otherwise the knight lands on e4 with strong activity.

Position: a8 white queen, g7 black king, a6 black pawn, d6 black queen, f6 black knight, h6 black pawn, b5 black pawn, c5 black pawn, f5 black pawn, g5 black pawn, b3 white pawn, e3 white pawn, f3 white knight, g3 white pawn, a2 white pawn, f2 white pawn, g2 white king, h2 white pawn

Position after 30...h6. Tan's 31.h4? was a strategic blunder because after 31...g4! White can no longer create an outside passed pawn on the kingside (via h3–g4) while Black's queenside majority is still active.

Ju won again in game 6 after Tan underestimated Ju's knight. Out of another English opening, Tan picked an unambitious line that leads to strategic positions with less theory. Black got a queenside pawn majority that gave her better prospects in an endgame, but the position was otherwise equal. On move 17, Tan made the critical decision to not exchange on f6 (diagram), and after 17...Ne4! Ju's knight exerted a dominating influence from to the e4-square, becoming much stronger than White's own knight on a3. Ju gave Tan a reprieve with the modest move 22...Bf6?, but although the position was objectively equal, Tan still had the inferior position. When she erred with 31.h4?, which neutralized her own kingside pawn majority, Ju's position became winning. Ju played the endgame precisely to win the game and take a 2-point lead.

1. c4 Nf6 2. Nf3 e6 3. b3 d5 4. Bb2 c5 5. cxd5 exd5 6. g3 Nc6 7. Bg2 d4 8. 0-0 Be7 9. Na3 0-0 10. e3 dxe3 11. dxe3 Bf5 12. Ne5 Nxe5 13. Bxe5 Qc8 14. Qe2 Bh3 15. Qf3 Bxg2 16. Kxg2 Qe6 17. Bb2 Ne4 18. Rfd1 Rad8 19. Nc4 b5 20. Ne5 f5 21. Nd3 g5 22. Ne1 Bf6 23. Bxf6 Qxf6 24. Rxd8 Rxd8 25. Rd1 Rxd1 26. Qxd1 Qd6 27. Qh5 Kg7 28. Qe8 a6 29. Nf3 Nf6 30. Qa8 h6 31. h4 g4 32. Qb7+ Qd7 33. Qxd7+ Nxd7 34. Nd2 Kf6 35. f4 Ke6 36. e4 fxe4 37. Nxe4 Kd5 38. Nf2 Nf6 39. Kf1 Kd4 40. Ke2 h5 41. a4 Kc3 42. axb5 axb5 43. Nd3 Ne4 44. Ke3 Nxg3 45. Nxc5 Nf5+ 46. Ke4 Nxh4 47. Ke5 Kb4 48. Ne4 Kxb3 49. Kf6 Nf3 50. f5 h4 51. Ke7 g3 52. f6 g2 0–1

==== Game 7: Ju–Tan, 1–0 ====
Ju–Tan, game 7

Position: d8 black rook, f8 black bishop, g8 black king, a7 black pawn, c7 black queen, f7 black pawn, g7 black pawn, h7 black pawn, a6 black bishop, c6 black pawn, e6 black pawn, c5 white knight, b4 black rook, e4 white pawn, b3 white pawn, c3 white queen, a2 white pawn, b2 white bishop, f2 white pawn, g2 white pawn, a1 white rook, d1 white rook, h1 white king

Position after 23.Nc5. With 23...Be2!, Tan could have pushed her advantage. The idea is that after 24.Rxd8 Qxd8 25.Qxb4? Black wins with 25...Qh4+! 26.Kg1 Bd6 and White has to give up the queen to prevent mate. 25.Kg1 would avoid the mate, but Black retains an advantage after 25...Rb5 26.Qe3 Bxc5 27.Qxe2. Nonetheless, the line is difficult enough that commentators said it is improbable a human would find it.

Ju won a third consecutive game to take a commanding lead. In a Sicilian Rossolimo, Ju played an uninspired opening, resulting in Tan gaining a slight advantage. Ju then played a pawn sacrifice with 17.Bb2, inviting complications. Tan missed the inhuman continuation 23...Be2! (diagram), which would have allowed her to make progress, and after further inaccuracies (25...Rb5?! and 27...Qh4+?!) the position turned in Ju's favor. One final mistake (35...Bb7?) led to Ju entombing Black's light-square bishop and converting the endgame. Tan admitted afterwards that she had perhaps invested too much time in looking for winning continuations thanks to the match situation, which resulted in time trouble during critical moments of the game. Ju was not happy with her play as well, since she had landed in an inferior position, and needed to get lucky (i.e. her opponent to make mistakes).

1. e4 c5 2. Nf3 Nc6 3. Bb5 e6 4. 0-0 Nge7 5. d4 cxd4 6. Nxd4 Qb6 7. Nxc6 bxc6 8. Bd3 Ng6 9. c4 Be7 10. Nc3 0-0 11. Na4 Qc7 12. c5 d5 13. cxd6 Bxd6 14. Qh5 Rb8 15. b3 Rd8 16. Rd1 Rb4 17. Bb2 Nf4 18. Qf3 Nxd3 19. Rxd3 Ba6 20. Rdd1 Bxh2+ 21. Kh1 Bd6 22. Qc3 Bf8 23. Nc5 Rb6 24. Qe5 Qe7 25. Rac1 Rb5 26. Rxd8 Qxd8 27. Qd4 Qh4+ 28. Kg1 Bc8 29. e5 Qxd4 30. Bxd4 a5 31. f4 h5 32. Kf2 Be7 33. Ke3 g5 34. Ne4 gxf4+ 35. Kxf4 Bb7 36. Bc5 Bxc5 37. Nxc5 Kg7 38. Kg5 Ba8 39. Kxh5 Rb8 40. Rc4 Rh8+ 41. Kg4 Rh2 42. Kg3 Rh5 43. Rg4+ Kf8 44. Ra4 Ke7 45. Rxa5 Rxe5 46. Ra7+ Kd6 47. b4 1–0

==== Game 8: Tan–Ju, 0–1 ====
Tan–Ju, game 8

Position: a8 black rook, g8 black king, c7 black pawn, d7 black bishop, f7 black pawn, g7 black pawn, a6 black pawn, d6 black pawn, g6 black queen, h6 black pawn, a5 white knight, b5 black pawn, e5 black rook, b4 white pawn, e4 white pawn, c3 white pawn, d3 white queen, e3 white rook, g3 white pawn, c2 white pawn, f2 white pawn, g2 white pawn, d1 white rook, g1 white king

Position after 23. Re3?!. Tan underestimates the upcoming pawn break on the f-file. After 23...Rae8 24.Rde1, Ju seized the initiative with 24...f5.

Ju won a fourth consecutive game in game 8. Tan played the Vienna Game and once again achieved a playable position, but was comprehensively outplayed by Ju. With 24...f5! Ju took the initiative, and her advantage grew after Tan failed to react correctly. After the desperate 30.Qa7, Ju declined a draw (she could have played 31...Qd1+ then 32...Qh5+ with a perpetual) and transitioned into a bishop vs. knight endgame with pawns on both flanks. This kind of endgame generally favors the side with the bishop because of the bishop's long range, and Ju had an advanced passed pawn on the third rank to boot. Ju once again showed excellent technique to win, giving Tan no chance to save the game.

1. e4 e5 2. Nc3 Nf6 3. Bc4 Nc6 4. d3 Bb4 5. Nf3 d6 6. 0-0 Bxc3 7. bxc3 0-0 8. Bg5 h6 9. Bh4 Na5 10. Bb3 Nxb3 11. axb3 Qe7 12. Re1 Qe6 13. d4 Nd7 14. Qd3 a6 15. Rad1 Re8 16. Bg3 b5 17. Nd2 Nf6 18. b4 Nh5 19. Nb3 Qg6 20. dxe5 Nxg3 21. hxg3 Rxe5 22. Na5 Bd7 23. Re3 Rae8 24. Rde1 f5 25. Qd4 Rxe4 26. Rxe4 Rxe4 27. Rxe4 fxe4 28. c4 e3 29. Qxe3 Qxc2 30. Qa7 bxc4 31. Qxc7 Bb5 32. Nb7 c3 33. Nxd6 Qd3 34. Qf7+ Kh7 35. Nf5 Qd7 36. Qxd7 Bxd7 37. Nd4 Ba4 38. Ne2 c2 39. f3 Kg6 40. Kf2 Bb5 41. Nc1 h5 42. Ke3 Kg5 43. Kd2 Bf1 44. Nb3 Bxg2 45. Nd4 Bxf3 46. Nxf3+ Kg4 47. Nd4 Kxg3 48. Nf5+ Kg4 49. Ne3+ Kf3 50. Nxc2 h4 51. Ne1+ Kg3 52. Ke3 h3 53. Nf3 h2 0–1

==== Game 9: Ju–Tan, ½–½ ====
Ju–Tan, game 9

Position: a8 black rook, c8 black bishop, d8 black queen, f8 black rook, g8 black king, b7 black pawn, f7 black pawn, h7 black pawn, a6 black pawn, e6 black pawn, f6 black bishop, g6 black pawn, d4 white pawn, e4 white bishop, e3 white bishop, a2 white pawn, b2 white pawn, f2 white pawn, g2 white pawn, h2 white pawn, a1 white rook, d1 white queen, e1 white rook, g1 white king

Position after 16...g6. In a slightly better position, Ju could have played 17.Rc1 to keep the game alive, but instead chose 17.Qb3, temporarily sacrificing the d4-pawn to kill all the (already slight) imbalance in the position.

Needing only a draw, Ju chose moves that led to all possible tension disappearing early. With 11.Nxd4 she signaled her willingness to accept a draw, and with 17.Qb3 she gave up a slight advantage to avoid complications. Tan had no chance to play for a win. With the uneventful draw, Ju became world champion for a fifth time.

1. e4 c5 2. Nf3 Nc6 3. Bb5 e6 4. 0-0 Nge7 5. Re1 Nd4 6. Nxd4 cxd4 7. c3 a6 8. Bf1 Nc6 9. Na3 Be7 10. Nc2 d5 11. Nxd4 Nxd4 12. cxd4 dxe4 13. d3 exd3 14. Bxd3 0-0 15. Be4 Bf6 16. Be3 g6 17. Qb3 Bxd4 18. Rad1 e5 19. Bxd4 exd4 20. Qb4 a5 21. Qxd4 Qxd4 22. Rxd4 Be6 23. Bd5 Rfd8 24. Red1 Rac8 25. Kf1 Rd6 26. Bxe6 Rxe6 27. Rd8+ Rxd8 28. Rxd8+ Kg7 29. Rd7 b6 30. g4 Kf6 31. Rb7 h5 32. gxh5 gxh5 33. Kg2 Kg6 34. Kg3 f6 35. h4 Kf5 36. Rh7 Kg6 37. Rb7 Kf5 38. Rh7 Kg6 ½–½
