= FIDE Women's Grand Swiss Tournament =

Women's chess tournament

The FIDE Women's Grand Swiss Tournament is a major women's chess competition organized by FIDE.

== Winners and results ==
The players who qualified for the Women's Candidates Tournament are marked with a green background. The players who otherwise qualified for the Women's Candidates Tournament before the start of the Women's Grand Swiss Tournament are marked with a purple background.

Edition	Host city	Players	Winner	Runner-up	Third
2021	(Latvia) Riga	50	(China) Lei Tingjie	(Germany) Elisabeth Pähtz	(China) Zhu Jiner
2023	(Isle of Man) Douglas	50	(India) Vaishali Rameshbabu	(Ukraine) Anna Muzychuk	(China) Tan Zhongyi
2025	(Uzbekistan) Samarkand	56	(India) Vaishali Rameshbabu	(FIDE) Kateryna Lagno	(Kazakhstan) Bibisara Assaubayeva

== See also ==
- FIDE Grand Swiss Tournament
- Women's Chess World Cup
