= FIDE Women's Grand Swiss Tournament 2021 =

Chess tournament in Riga, Latvia

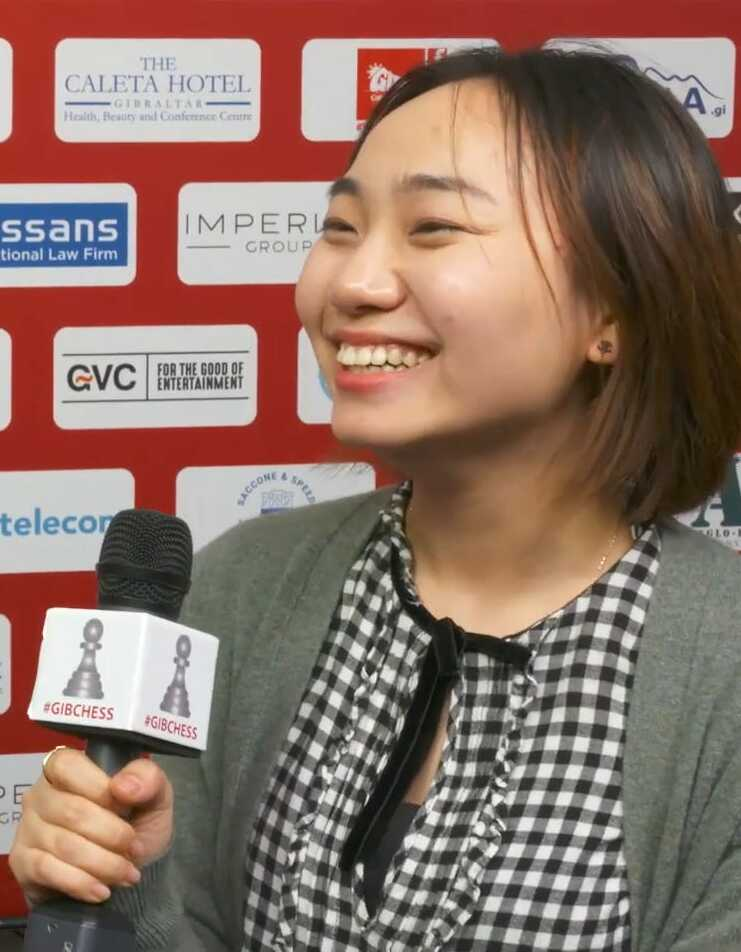
- 2021 Grand Swiss Tournament winner Lei Tingjie

Tournament information
- Sport: Chess
- Location: (Latvia) Riga
- Dates: 27 October 2021– 7 November 2021
- Administrator: FIDE
- Tournament format: Swiss-system tournament
- Host(s): IOM International; Chess Limited

Final positions
- Champion: (China) Lei Tingjie

The FIDE Women's Grand Swiss Tournament 2021 was a chess tournament that formed part of the qualification cycle for the Women's World Chess Championship 2022. It was an 11-round Swiss-system tournament, with 50 players competing, ran from 27 October to 7 November 2021 in Riga, Latvia, in parallel with the FIDE Grand Swiss Tournament 2021. It was the first FIDE Women's Grand Swiss Tournament.

The top finisher who had not already qualified qualified for the Women's Candidates Tournament 2022.

== Qualifiers ==
The following 50 players were invited:

- 40 qualifiers by rating: the top 40 women by the average of the 12 rating lists from 1 July 2020 to 1 June 2021;
- 4 places, one nominated by each of the four FIDE continental presidents;
- 3 nominations of the FIDE president.
- 3 nominations of the organizer, including 1 online qualifier.

In August 2021, FIDE announced the 40 top players by rating, as well as 20 reserves.

The top four qualifiers by rating declined their invitations, including Aleksandra Goryachkina, Koneru Humpy and Ju Wenjun, who had no need to play, either through being Women's World Champion (Ju Wenjun), or having already qualified for the 2022 Women's Candidates Tournament. Goryachkina played in the Open Grand Swiss Tournament instead.

== Tournament table ==
FIDE Women's Grand Swiss Tournament 2021 (Riga, 27.10.2021-07.11.2021)
Place	Name	Rating	1	2	3	4	5	6	7	8	9	10	11	Points	TB1	TB2	TB3
1	Lei Tingjie (CHN)	2505	24b1	23w1	2b½	26w1	18b½	11w1	17b1	19w1	8b1	4w½	3b½	9	64,5	70	56
2	Elisabeth Pähtz (GER)	2475	12w1	33b1	1w½	18w½	6b1	3b½	9w1	8w½	4b0	5b½	10w1	7½	69,5	74,5	49,5
3	Zhu Jiner (CHN)	2455	44b1	32w1	17b½	5w½	19b1	2w½	8b0	4w½	9w1	6b1	1w½	7½	67,5	71,5	46,75
4	Mariya Muzychuk (UKR)	2536	35b½	10w½	7b½	21w½	24b1	18w1	6w½	3b½	2w1	1b½	5w½	7	69	74	46,5
5	Harika Dronavalli (IND)	2511	39w½	46b1	22w1	3b½	9w½	17w½	11b½	7w½	19b1	2w½	4b½	7	64,5	68,5	42,25
6	Lela Javakhishvili (GEO)	2446	45w1	8b½	20w1	25b½	2w0	26w1	4b½	18w½	7b1	3w0	17b1	7	64,5	68,5	41
7	Olga Badelka (RUS)	2438	49w1	20b½	4w½	41b½	28w1	9b0	21w1	5b½	6w0	33b1	12w1	7	61	63	37,25
8	Alexandra Kosteniuk (RUS)	2518	47b1	6w½	26b½	10w1	17b0	14w1	3w1	2b½	1w0	9b½	13w½	6½	68,5	72,5	41
9	Natalia Pogonina (RUS)	2467	43b1	28w1	18b½	17w½	5b½	7w1	2b0	11w1	3b0	8w½	14b½	6½	66	70,5	39,5
10	Bibisara Assaubayeva (KAZ)	2400	27w½	4b½	13w1	8b0	22w1	29b½	25b1	17w½	18b½	20w1	2b0	6½	62,5	68	39
11	Jolanta Zawadzka (POL)	2428	46w½	39b½	30w1	45b1	27w1	1b0	5w½	9b0	15w½	16b½	21w1	6½	61	65	35,25
12	Deysi Cori (PER)	2382	2b0	25w0	34b0	50w1	47b1	31w1	26b1	20w1	17b½	18w1	7b0	6½	58	58,5	30,5
13	Batkhuyagiin Möngöntuul (MGL)	2433	14b½	40w½	10b0	42b1	44w1	20w1	19b0	22b½	39w1	17w½	8b½	6½	57	61	33,75
14	Vantika Agrawal (IND)	2322	13w½	36b½	46w1	28b½	25w½	8b0	45w1	16b½	22w½	39b1	9w½	6½	56,5	60,5	33,25
15	Olga Girya (RUS)	2410	18b0	34w1	32b½	37w1	26b½	19w0	40b½	25w1	11b½	27w½	24b1	6½	55,5	60	34,5
16	Pia Cramling (SWE)	2447	32b0	44w0	31b½	48w1	40b½	43w1	24b1	14w½	29b½	11w½	27b1	6½	53	55,5	32,25
17	Nino Batsiashvili (GEO)	2484	30w1	29b1	3w½	9b½	8w1	5b½	1w0	10b½	12w½	13b½	6w0	6	68,5	74	37,75
18	Nana Dzagnidze (GEO)	2524	15w1	21b1	9w½	2b½	1w½	4b0	35w1	6b½	10w½	12b0	22w½	6	68,5	73,5	38,75
19	Alina Kashlinskaya (RUS)	2493	28w0	43b1	42w1	44b1	3w0	15b1	13w1	1b0	5w0	21b0	29w1	6	62,5	66,5	31,5
20	Polina Shuvalova (RUS)	2509	42b1	7w½	6b0	24w½	41w1	13b0	33w1	12b0	35w1	10b0	32w1	6	58,5	63	30,25
21	Iulija Osmak (UKR)	2423	34b1	18w0	40b½	4b½	45w1	25w½	7b0	30w1	27b½	19w1	11b0	6	58,5	62,5	31,75
22	Antoaneta Stefanova (BUL)	2475	40b½	31w1	5b0	32w½	10b0	44w1	34b1	13w½	14b½	29w½	18b½	6	58	62	31,5
23	Ekaterina Atalik (TUR)	2420	48w1	1b0	41w0	30b½	38w½	45b½	28w1	39b0	40w1	32b½	33w1	6	52,5	55	27,25
24	Irene Kharisma Sukandar (INA)	2406	1w0	48b1	27w½	20b½	4w0	38b1	16w0	42b½	34w1	36b1	15w0	5½	60	62,5	25,5
25	Zhansaya Abdumalik (KAZ)	2507	33w0	12b1	39w1	6w½	14b½	21b½	10w0	15b0	32w½	28b½	42w1	5½	59	63,5	30,5
26	Valentina Gunina (RUS)	2462	38w1	41b1	8w½	1b0	15w½	6b0	12w0	46b1	33w0	40b½	39w1	5½	59	63	26,75
27	Dinara Saduakassova (KAZ)	2491	10b½	35w½	24b½	40w1	11b0	30w½	32b½	34w1	21w½	15b½	16w0	5½	58	62,5	29,5
28	Anna M. Sargsyan (ARM)	2402	19b1	9b0	36w1	14w½	7b0	34w0	23b0	38b1	42w½	25w½	43b1	5½	57	61,5	28,75
29	Vaishali Rameshbabu (IND)	2419	50b1	17w0	44b0	31w1	32b½	10w½	30b½	40w1	16w½	22b½	19b0	5½	55,5	56	25,25
30	Monika Soćko (POL)	2397	17b0	50w1	11b0	23w½	36b1	27b½	29w½	21b0	37w½	47w1	31b½	5½	55	55,5	23,25
31	Meruert Kamalidenova (KAZ)	2339	36w½	22b0	16w½	29b0	42w1	12b0	49w1	33b0	50w1	35b1	30w½	5½	51,5	52	20,5
32	Salome Melia (GEO)	2371	16w1	3b0	15w½	22b½	29w½	33b½	27w½	35b½	25b½	23w½	20b0	5	60	65	29
33	Leya Garifullina (RUS)	2409	25b1	2w0	37b½	36w½	34b½	32w½	20b0	31w1	26b1	7w0	23b0	5	58	63	26,5
34	Laura Rogule (LAT)	2289	21w0	15b0	12w1	39b1	33w½	28b1	22w0	27b0	24b0	41w½	47b1	5	55,5	59,5	25,25
35	Aleksandra Maltsevskaya (RUS)	2411	4w½	27b½	45w0	38b½	37b1	41w1	18b0	32w½	20b0	31w0	49b1	5	53,5	55,5	22,75
36	Meri Arabidze (GEO)	2441	31b½	14w½	28b0	33b½	30w0	49b½	38w½	41b½	46w1	24w0	44b1	5	51	53	22,25
37	Elina Danielian (ARM)	2450	41w0	38b1	33w½	15b0	35w0	39b0	48w1	45b½	30b½	44w½	46w1	5	48	50,5	20,75
38	Hoang Thanh Trang (HUN)	2380	26b0	37w0	50b1	35w½	23b½	24w0	36b½	28w0	44b½	48w1	45b1	5	48	48,5	17
39	Nataliya Buksa (UKR)	2409	5b½	11w½	25b0	34w0	43b½	37w1	41b1	23w1	13b0	14w0	26b0	4½	58	62,5	24,5
40	Alina Bivol (RUS)	2392	22w½	13b½	21w½	27b0	16w½	46b1	15w½	29b0	23b0	26w½	50b½	4½	58	58,5	22,75
41	Ketevan Arakhamia-Grant (SCO)	2376	37b1	26w0	23b1	7w½	20b0	35b0	39w0	36w½	47b0	34b½	48w1	4½	53	55,5	22
42	Karina Cyfka (POL)	2409	20w0	49b1	19b0	13w0	31b0	47w1	44b1	24w½	28b½	43w½	25b0	4½	53	55	17,75
43	Jovanka Houska (ENG)	2381	9w0	19w0	48b½	49b1	39w½	16b0	46w0	50b1	45w1	42b½	28w0	4½	46	46,5	12,25
44	Padmini Rout (IND)	2380	3w0	16b1	29w1	19w0	13b0	22b0	42w0	49b1	38w½	37b½	36w0	4	57,5	59,5	19
45	Carolina Luján (ARG)	2340	6b0	47w1	35b1	11w0	21b0	23w½	14b0	37w½	43b0	49w1	38w0	4	55,5	57,5	16,5
46	Divya Deshmukh (IND)	2305	11b½	5w0	14b0	47w½	48b1	40w0	43b1	26w0	36b0	50w1	37b0	4	51	51,5	12,75
47	Sophie Milliet (FRA)	2410	8w0	45b0	49w½	46b½	12w0	42b0	50w1	48b1	41w1	30b0	34w0	4	45	45,5	10,5
48	Madara Golsta (LAT)	2003	23b0	24w0	43w½	16b0	46w0	50b1	37b0	47w0	49w1	38b0	41b0	2½	47	47,5	4,75
49	Maria Eizaguerri Floris (ESP)	2328	7b0	42w0	47b½	43w0	50b1	36w½	31b0	44w0	48b0	45b0	35w0	2	46	46,5	5
50	Jesse February (RSA)	1857	29w0	30b0	38w0	12b0	49w0	48w0	47b0	43w0	31b0	46b0	40w½	½	47,5	49,5	2,25
