= FIDE Women's Grand Swiss Tournament 2023 =

Chess tournament in Douglas, Isle of Man

FIDE Grand Swiss Tournament 2023
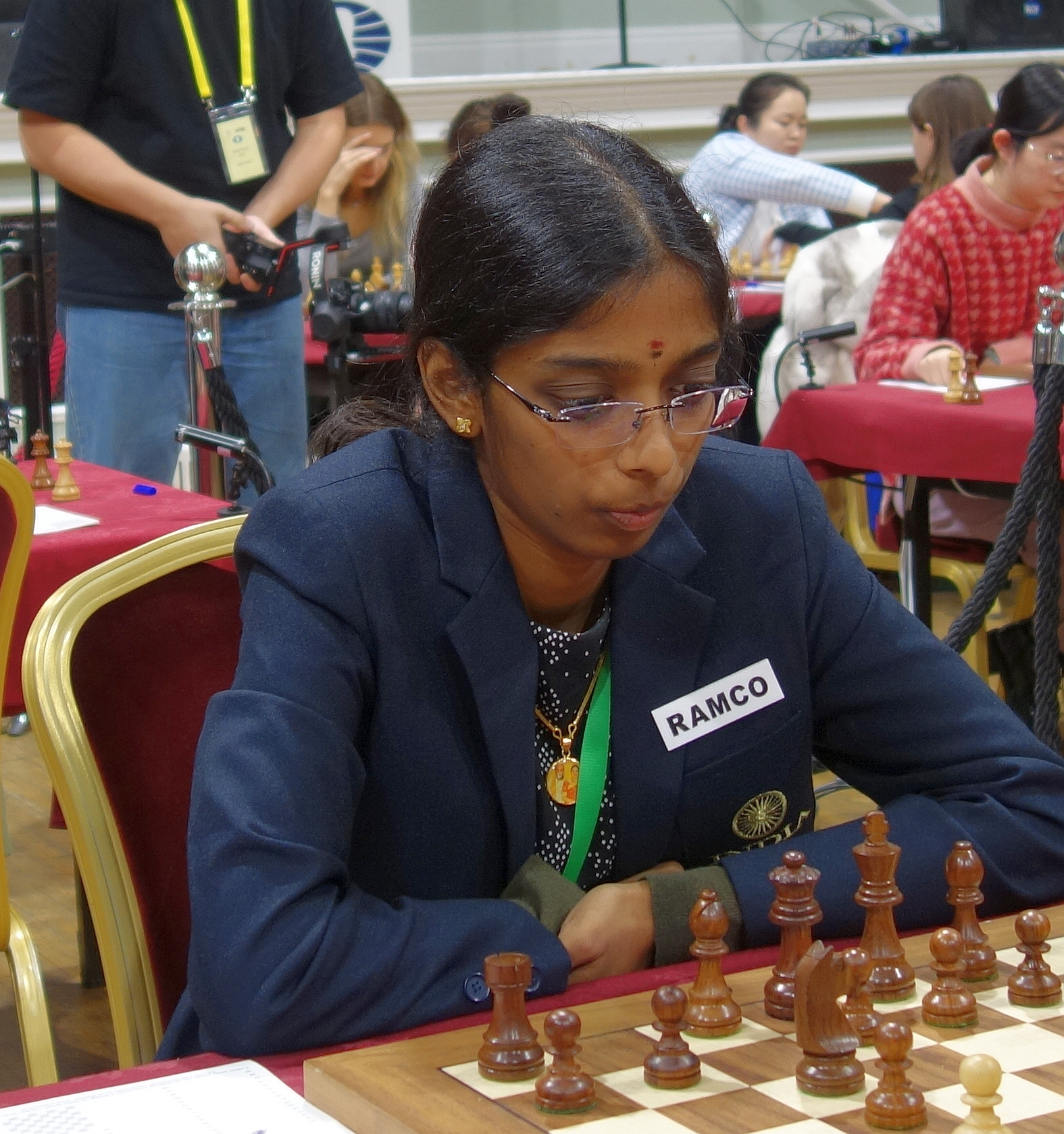
- 2023 Women's Grand Swiss tournament winner Vaishali Rameshbabu at the event

Tournament information
- Sport: Chess
- Location: Douglas, Isle of Man
- Dates: 25 October 2023– 5 November 2023
- Administrator: FIDE
- Format: 11-round Swiss-system tournament
- Host(s): IOM International Chess Limited, sponsored by Scheinberg family
- Venue: Villa Marina
- Participants: 50

Final positions
- Champion: (India) Vaishali Rameshbabu
- Runner-up: (Ukraine) Anna Muzychuk
- 3rd place: (China) Tan Zhongyi

The FIDE Women's Grand Swiss Tournament 2023 was the second edition of the FIDE Women's Grand Swiss Tournament, a chess tournament that formed part of the qualification cycle for the Women's World Chess Championship match in 2025. It was an 11-round Swiss-system tournament with 50 players competing from 25 October to 5 November 2023 in the Isle of Man. The winner and third-place finisher of the tournament (Vaishali Rameshbabu and Tan Zhongyi) earned the right to the play in the Women's Candidates Tournament 2024, since Anna Muzychuk, the runner-up of the tournament, had already qualified for the event.

The event was held in parallel with the FIDE Grand Swiss Tournament 2023.

== Format ==
The tournament had an 11-round Swiss format, with pairings made using the Dutch system for Swiss tournaments. The time control for each game was: 90 minutes for the first 40 moves, followed by 30 minutes for the rest of the game with an increment of 30 seconds per move starting from move 1.

=== Tie-breaks ===
Tie-breaks between players who finished on the same score were determined, in order, by the following tie-breaks:

1. Average rating of opponents, cut 1;
2. Buchholz system, cut 1;
3. Buchholz system;
4. The results of individual games between tied players;
5. Drawing of lots.

=== Venue and schedule ===
The tournament ran from 25 October to 5 November 2023 in the Isle of Man, the original location of the previous Grand Swiss tournament. Games were played at the Royal Hall of the Villa Marina.

Date	Event
24 October	Opening ceremony
25 October	Round 1
26 October	Round 2
27 October	Round 3
28 October	Round 4
29 October	Round 5
30 October	Round 6
31 October	Free day
1 November	Round 7
2 November	Round 8
3 November	Round 9
4 November	Round 10
5 November	Round 11
5 November	Closing ceremony

== Qualifiers ==
Under FIDE regulations, the initial 50 invites were distributed as follows:

- 40 qualifiers by rating - the top 40 women players in the FIDE rating list of 1 June 2023. (Note: Only players who played at least 10 rated games counted in any of the 12 FIDE rating periods from July 2022 to June 2023 were eligible.)
- 4 continental spots, each nominated by one of the four FIDE continental presidents.
- 4 players nominated by the FIDE president.
- Up to 2 players nominated by the organizer (Isle of Man International Chess Limited)

Various methods were also specified to replace a player who declined an invitation.

== Results ==
2023 FIDE Women's Grand Swiss Tournament, 25 October – 5 November 2023, Douglas, Isle of Man
Pos	Team	Rating	Pts	AROC-1
1	Vaishali Rameshbabu (IND)	2448	8.5	2456
2	Anna Muzychuk (UKR)	2510	8	2446
3	Tan Zhongyi (CHN)	2517	7.5	2444
4	Batkhuyagiin Möngöntuul (MGL)	2366	7.5	2441
5	Leya Garifullina (FIDE)	2402	7	2465
6	Antoaneta Stefanova (BUL)	2424	7	2430
7	Pia Cramling (SWE)	2446	7	2409
8	Mariya Muzychuk (UKR)	2519	7	2403
9	Stavroula Tsolakidou (GRE)	2385	6.5	2465
10	Deysi Cori (PER)	2367	6.5	2464
11	Mai Narva (EST)	2399	6.5	2463
12	Bibisara Assaubayeva (KAZ)	2469	6.5	2439
13	Monika Soćko (POL)	2380	6.5	2437
14	Lela Javakhishvili (GEO)	2437	6.5	2405
15	Meruert Kamalidenova (KAZ)	2351	6	2481
16	Sophie Milliet (FRA)	2391	6	2474
17	Aleksandra Goryachkina (FIDE)	2558	6	2440
18	Divya Deshmukh (IND)	2408	6	2414
19	Harika Dronavalli (IND)	2502	6	2413
20	Irina Bulmaga (ROU)	2423	6	2409
21	Gunay Mammadzada (AZE)	2441	6	2403
22	Anna Ushenina (UKR)	2434	6	2399
23	Valentina Gunina (FIDE)	2439	6	2396
24	Dinara Wagner (GER)	2461	6	2387
25	Pauline Guichard (FRA)	2358	5.5	2453
26	Tania Sachdev (IND)	2389	5.5	2434
27	Teodora Injac (SRB)	2426	5.5	2419
28	Oliwia Kiołbasa (POL)	2375	5.5	2418
29	Elisabeth Pähtz (GER)	2484	5.5	2407
30	Alexandra Kosteniuk (SUI)	2523	5.5	2367
31	Vantika Agrawal (IND)	2435	5.5	2364
32	Govhar Beydullayeva (AZE)	2383	5	2447
33	Medina Warda Aulia (INA)	2362	5	2424
34	Eline Roebers (NED)	2390	5	2417
35	Polina Shuvalova (FIDE)	2506	5	2395
36	Marsel Efroimski (ISR)	2447	5	2391
37	Ulviyya Fataliyeva (AZE)	2393	4.5	2449
38	Hoang Thanh Trang (HUN)	2398	4.5	2432
39	Savitha Shri B (IND)	2375	4.5	2431
40	Mariam Mkrtchyan (ARM)	2343	4.5	2428
41	Julianna Terbe (HUN)	2266	4.5	2422
42	Alice Lee (USA)	2388	4.5	2353
43	Ana Matnadze (ESP)	2400	4	2388
44	Elina Danielian (ARM)	2416	4	2366
45	Ketevan Arakhamia-Grant (SCO)	2297	4	2365
46	Mihaela Sandu (ROU)	2298	3.5	2413
47	Nino Batsiashvili (GEO)	2475	3.5	2373
48	Trisha Kanyamarala (IRL)	2184	3	2357
49	Javiera Belén Gómez Barrera (CHI)	2266	2	2363
50	Lina Nassr (ALG)	2066	2	2341

Updated to match(es) played on 1 November 2023. Source: "2023 FIDE Women's Grand Swiss".
Rules for classification: "Regulations for the FIDE Women's Grand Swiss Tournament 2023" (PDF).
