= Tennyson Olisa =

Nigerian chess player (born 2003)

Tennyson Ewomazino Olisa
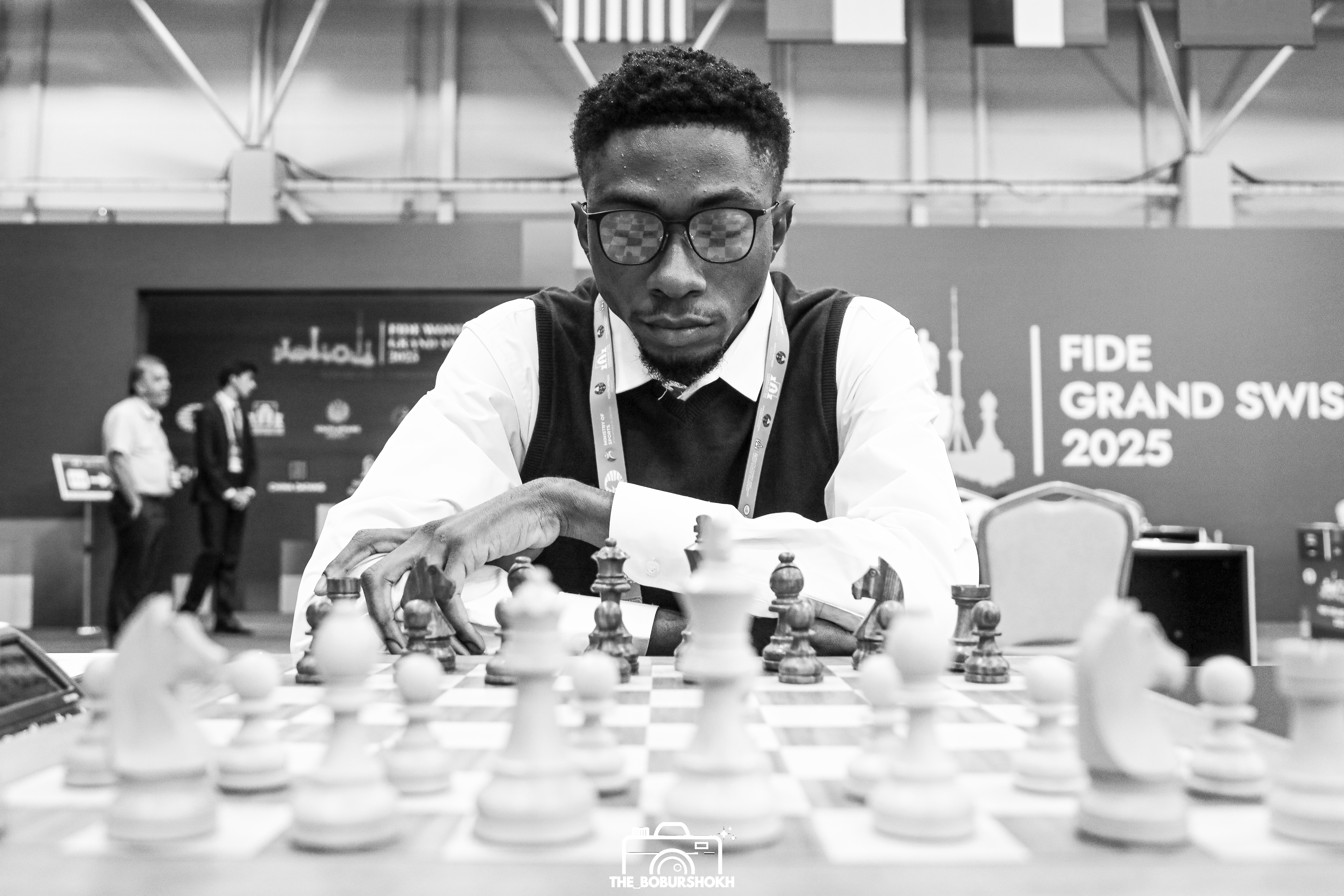
- Tennyson at the FIDE Grand Swiss Tournament 2025

Personal information
- Born: 2003 (age 22–23) Delta State, Nigeria

Chess career
- Country: Nigeria
- Title: FIDE Master (2026)
- Peak rating: 2301 (January 2026)

Tennyson Ewomazino Olisa (born 2003) is a Nigerian chess player who holds the FIDE title of Candidate Master. He won the 2025 Nigeria National Chess Championships (Invitational Open) and won silver at the 2025 FIDE Zone 4.2 West Africa Championship, later winning the 2025 Africa Super Zonal Championship and qualifying for the 2025 FIDE Grand Swiss Tournament.

== Early life and education ==
Tennyson is from Delta State, Nigeria. He is enrolled as a Software Engineering student at the Federal University of Technology, Owerri (FUTO).

== Chess career ==
=== Awards ===
In 2023, Tennyson won the John Fawole Chess Award for Junior Player of the Year (Boys).

=== Nigeria National Chess Championship ===
Tennyson competed in the NATIONAL CHESS CHAMPIONSHIPS 2025 (INVITATIONAL OPEN) and finished tied for first on points after eleven rounds, advancing to a championship playoff.

His round-by-round results include wins over IM Oluwafemi Balogun, FM Abiola Akinseye, Ajibola Olanrewaju, and a final-round win over Lucky Musa Keyi.

Round	Opponent	Result
1	FM Abdulrahman Abdulraheem Akintoye	Loss
2	Odey Goodness Ekunke	Win
3	Bartholomew Emmanuel Okhipo	Win
4	FM Bomo Kigigha	Loss
5	IM Oluwafemi Balogun	Win
6	IM Odion Aikhoje	Draw
7	FM Abiola Akinseye	Win
8	FM Denyefa Callistus Eyetonghan	Win (walkover/forfeit shown in tournament record)
9	Ajibola Olanrewaju	Win
10	Tersee Ferdinand Nyuima	Draw
11	Lucky Musa Keyi	Win

In the playoff against Akintoye, Tennyson won 1.5–0.5, drawing the first game as Black and winning the second game as White to secure the national title.

He is the reigning Nigerian National Chess Champion.

=== Zonal and continental events ===
At the 2025 Zone 4.2 West Africa Championship in Lagos, Tennyson won the silver medal with 7/9 points. A highlighted result was his Round 7 win over top seed IM Mariano Ortega Amarelle.

In 2025, Tennyson won the Africa Super Zonal Championship with 7½/9 points, earning Africa’s qualification place for the 2025 FIDE Grand Swiss Tournament.

=== FIDE Grand Swiss ===
In 2025, Tennyson qualified for the FIDE Grand Swiss via the Africa continental spot; the Nigeria Chess Federation stated he was the first Nigerian to qualify for the event.

== Achievements and career highlights ==
- 2016 – Discovered chess.
- 2017–2018 – Represented Delta State at the National Youth Games, winning two gold medals, one silver medal and one bronze medal.
- 2021 – Represented Nigeria at the African Junior Chess Championships (Liberia).
- 2022 – Southwest Blitz Champion.
- 2022 – Best Blitz Player (Nigeria) – John Fawole Chess Awards.
- 2023 – Represented Nigeria at the African Junior Chess Championships (Mauritania).
- 2023 – 3rd place, Nigerian National Chess Championship (Open).
- 2023 – John Fawole Chess Award, Junior Player of the Year (Boys).
- 2024 – Gold medalist, Ecobank National Schools Team Chess Championship (Lagos).
- April 2025 – Silver medal, Zone 4.2 West Africa Championship (2nd place).
- April 2025 – Africa Super Zonal Champion (7½/9).
- 2025 – Double gold medalist, National Sports Festival.
- 2025 – First Nigerian to qualify for and play in the FIDE Grand Swiss.
- 2025 – Defeated multiple titled players, including IM Mariano Ortega Amarelle at the Zone 4.2 West Africa Championship.
- 2025 – Nigeria National Chess Champion (Invitational Open).

== Tournament results ==
Year	Event	Location	Placing	Score/notes	Source
2022	Southwest National Chess Championship (Blitz)	Nigeria	4th	5.5 points (standing order shown)	
2023	Nigerian National Chess Championship (Open)	Nigeria	3rd	Tournament report standings	
2023	African Junior Chess Championships (Open)	Mauritania	8th	3.0 points (standing order shown)	
2024	National Friends of Chess Championship	Nigeria	13th	Standing order shown	
2024	Nigeria National Open Team Olympiad Trials	Nigeria	12th	Standing order shown	
2025	Zone 4.2 West Africa Championship	Lagos, Nigeria	2nd	7/9 (silver medal)	
2025	Africa Super Zonals Chess Championship (Open)	Lagos, Nigeria	1st	7.5/9	
2025	National Chess Championships (Invitational Open)	Nigeria	Champion	8 points after 11 rounds; won playoff 1.5–0.5	

Beyond the tournaments listed above, Tennyson has also played in other FIDE-profiled events including the Nigeria National Sports Festival (chess) and other international opens.

== Notable games ==
=== Win vs IM Mariano Ortega Amarelle (Zone 4.2 West Africa Championship, 2025) ===
Ortega Amarelle vs. Olisa, Lagos 2025

Position: g1 black rook, h2 white pawn, g2 white king, f2 white rook, h3 black knight, c3 white knight, g4 black pawn, e4 white pawn, b4 white pawn, a4 white pawn, h5 white knight, d5 white pawn, b6 black pawn, a7 black pawn, g8 black king

Final position

Tennyson’s Round 7 win over the top seed was highlighted in FIDE’s Zone 4.2 tournament report.

[Event "AFRICA ZONE 4.2 OPEN"]
[Site "LAGOS"]
[Date "2025.04.06"]
[Round "7"]
[Board "3"]
[White "Ortega Amarelle, Mariano"]
[Black "Olisa, Tennyson Ewomazino"]
[Result "0-1"]
[WhiteElo "2420"]
[BlackElo "2137"]

1. Nf3 g6 2. c4 Bg7 3. d4 Nf6 4. Nc3 d6 5. e4 O-O 6. Be2 e5 7. Be3 Nc6 8. d5 Ne7
9. Nd2 Ne8 10. b4 f5 11. f3 Nf6 12. c5 fxe4 13. fxe4 Nh5 14. Bf3 Nf4 15. O-O g5 16.
Nc4 b6 17. a4 Neg6 18. Ra2 Nh4 19. Bg4 Bxg4 20. Qxg4 h5 21. Qd1 Qe7 22. g3 Nh3+ 23.
Kh1 Ng6 24. Rxf8+ Rxf8 25. Qxh5 Rf1+ 26. Kg2 Qf7 27. Qg4 Re1 28. Qe6 g4 29. Qxf7+
Kxf7 30. cxd6 cxd6 31. Nxd6+ Kg8 32. Nf5 Ngf4+ 33. gxf4 exf4 34. Nxg7 Rxe3 35. Nh5
f3+ 36. Kg3 f2+ 37. Kg2 Re1 38. Rxf2 Rg1#  0-1

== Ratings ==
Tennyson’s peak standard rating is 2301 (January 2026).
