= Women's Candidates Tournament 2024 =

Chess tournament in Toronto, Canada

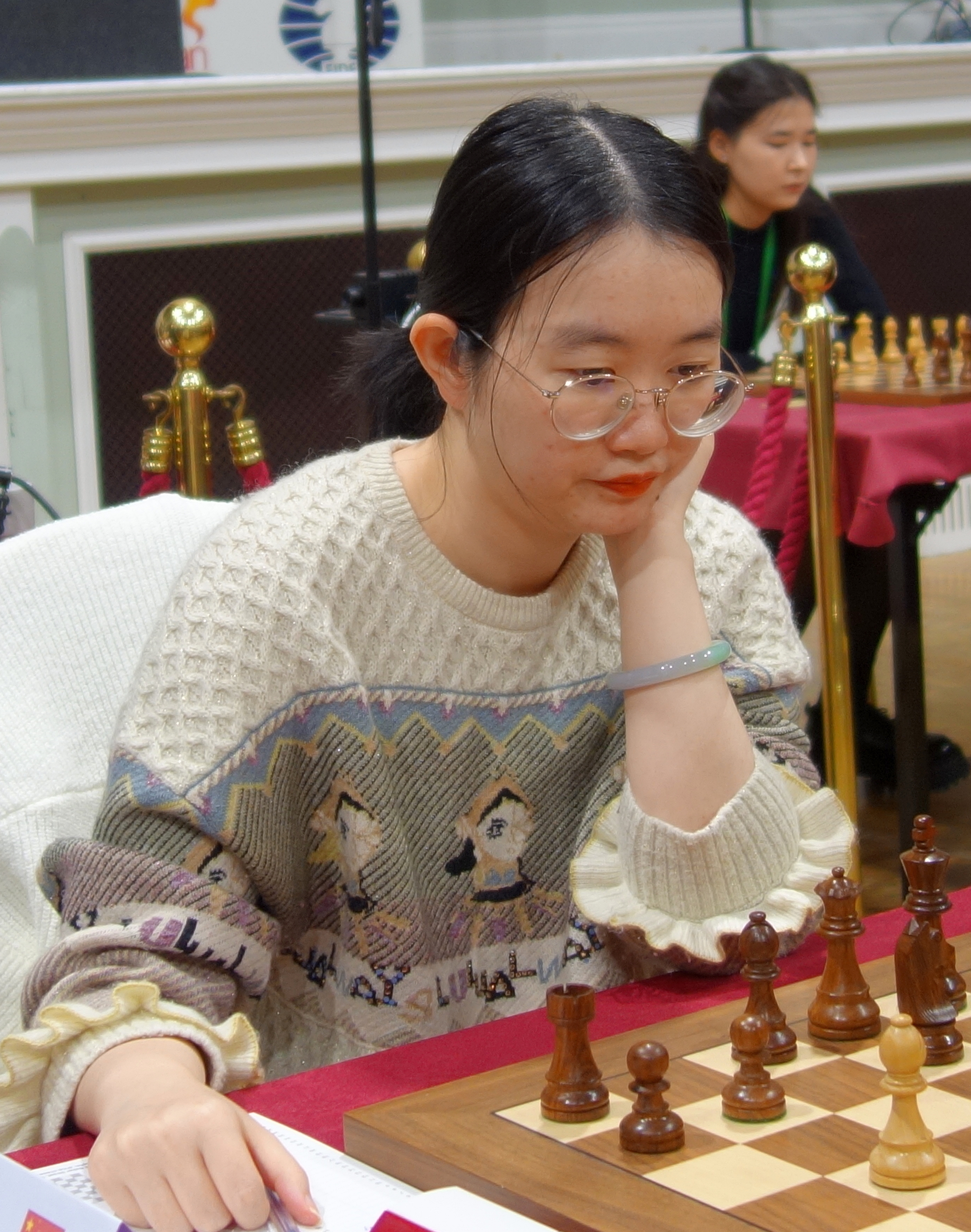
- Tan Zhongyi, the winner of the tournament, advanced to the Women's World Chess Championship 2025 match.

Tournament information
- Sport: Chess
- Location: Toronto, Canada
- Dates: 3 April–22 April 2024
- Administrator: FIDE
- Tournament format: Double round-robin tournament
- Participants: 8 from 5 nations

Final positions
- Champion: (China) Tan Zhongyi

The FIDE Women's Candidates Tournament 2024 was an eight-player chess tournament held to determine the challenger for the Women's World Chess Championship 2025. It was held from 3 April to 22 April 2024 in Toronto, Canada, alongside the Candidates Tournament 2024.

It was a double round-robin tournament. Tan Zhongyi won the tournament and played in the Women's World Chess Championship 2025 against the defending Women's World Chess Champion Ju Wenjun.

== Qualification ==
The eight players who qualified were:

Qualification method	Player	Age	Rating	Rank
Qualification method	Player	(April 2024)		
2023 Women's World Championship runner-up	(China) Lei Tingjie	27	2550	4
The top two finishers in the Women's Grand; Prix 2022–23	(FIDE) Kateryna Lagno (Note: Russian players' flags are displayed as the FIDE flag, as FIDE banned Russian and Belarusian flags from FIDE-rated events in response to the Russian invasion of Ukraine.) (winner)	34	2542	6
The top two finishers in the Women's Grand; Prix 2022–23	(FIDE) Aleksandra Goryachkina (runner-up)	25	2553	3
The top three finishers in the Women's Chess World; Cup 2023 (Note: Aleksandra Goryachkina finished first in the Women's Chess World Cup 2023, but had already qualified for the Candidates through the FIDE Women's Grand Prix 2022–23. She is replaced by Koneru Humpy, who was the highest-rated player on the January 2024 FIDE rating list who had played a minimum of 30 games.)	(Bulgaria) Nurgyul Salimova (runner-up)	20	2432	36
The top three finishers in the Women's Chess World; Cup 2023	(Ukraine) Anna Muzychuk (third place)	34	2520	8
The top two finishers in the Women's Grand Swiss; 2023 (Note: Anna Muzychuk finished second in the Women's Grand Swiss 2023, but she had already qualified for the Candidates through the Women's Chess World Cup 2023. According to the regulations, the second spot for the Candidates via the Women's Grand Swiss was awarded to the highest finisher of the Grand Swiss who had not already qualified (3rd-place finisher Tan Zhongyi).)	(India) Vaishali Rameshbabu (winner)	22	2475	15
The top two finishers in the Women's Grand Swiss; 2023	(China) Tan Zhongyi (third place)	32	2521	7
Highest-rated active player for January 2024	(India) Koneru Humpy	37	2546	5

== Organization ==
The tournament was an eight-player, double round-robin tournament, meaning there were 14 rounds with each player facing the others twice: once with the black pieces and once with the white pieces. The tournament winner qualified to play Ju Wenjun for the Women's World Chess Championship 2025.

Players from the same federation were required to play each other in the first rounds of each half to avoid collusion. The players affected in the 2024 Women's Candidates were Kateryna Lagno and Aleksandra Goryachkina representing FIDE, Lei Tingjie and Tan Zhongyi representing China, and R Vaishali and Koneru Humpy representing India. They faced each other in rounds 1 and 8.

In March 2024, FIDE announced pairings for the tournament.

=== Regulations ===
The time control was 90 minutes for the first 40 moves, then 30 minutes for the rest of the game, plus a 30-second increment per move starting from move 1. Players received 1 point for a win, ½ point for a draw and 0 points for a loss.

Tiebreaks for the first place would have been addressed as follows:

- Players would have played two rapid chess games at 15 minutes plus 10 seconds per move. If a three- to six-way tie had occurred, a single round-robin would be played. If seven or eight players had been tied, a single round-robin would be played with a time limit of 10 minutes plus 5 seconds per move.
- If any players had still been tied for first after the rapid chess games, they would play two blitz chess games at 3 minutes plus 2 seconds per move. In the case of more than two players being tied, a single round-robin would be played.
- If any players were still tied for first after these blitz chess games, the remaining players would play a knock-out blitz tournament at the same time control. In each mini-match of the proposed knock-out tournament, the first player to win a game would win the mini-match.

Ties for places other than first were broken by, in order: (1) Sonneborn–Berger score; (2) total number of wins; (3) head-to-head score among tied players; (4) drawing of lots.

The prize money was €24,000 for first place, €18,000 for second place, and €12,000 for third place (with players on the same number of points sharing prize money, irrespective of tie-breaks), plus €1,750 per half-point for every player, for a total prize pool of €250,000.

== Schedule ==
Date	Event
Wednesday, 3 April	Opening ceremony
Thursday, 4 April	Round 1
Friday, 5 April	Round 2
Saturday, 6 April	Round 3
Sunday, 7 April	Round 4
Monday, 8 April	Rest day
Tuesday, 9 April	Round 5
Wednesday, 10 April	Round 6
Thursday, 11 April	Round 7
Friday, 12 April	Rest day
Saturday, 13 April	Round 8
Sunday, 14 April	Round 9
Monday, 15 April	Round 10
Tuesday, 16 April	Rest day
Wednesday, 17 April	Round 11
Thursday, 18 April	Round 12
Friday, 19 April	Rest day
Saturday, 20 April	Round 13
Sunday, 21 April	Round 14
Monday, 22 April	Tie breaks (if required); Closing ceremony

== Results ==
Tan Zhongyi led from start to finish to win the tournament. She was the only player who won in the first round (against Lei Tingjie), and when she won again in the second round, she built up a lead over her rivals. In the first half of the tournament Aleksandra Goryachkina kept pace with Tan, but Tan stayed half a point ahead. A momentous round 8 saw Lei win a third consecutive game against Tan. This led to a three-way tie for first. However, Tan won again in round 9, while Goryachkina lost in round 10 to fall behind. By round 12, only Tan and Lei were still in with a realistic chance. When Lei lost to Vaishali in round 13, Tan was effectively champion. A draw in the final round gave Tan the tournament victory, with a 1.5-point margin.

For the other competitors, Muzychuk achieved several winning positions, but she did not manage to win them, and she finished the tournament as the only player who did not win a game. Salimova, the only non-grandmaster in the field (Vaishali was a GM-elect), also had a difficult tournament, finishing joint-last with Muzychuk. Humpy started the tournament poorly with losses in rounds 4 and 6, but recovered in the second half to finish on +1. Vaishali had an even more turbulent tournament, at one point losing four games in a row to be solidly last, but then winning five consecutive games at the end to tie for 2nd–4th.

=== Standings ===
Standings of the 2024 Candidates Tournament
Rank	Player	Score	SB	Wins	Qualification	TZ		KH		LT		VR		AG		KL		NS		AM	
1	Tan Zhongyi (CHN)	9 / 14	60.5	5	Advanced to title match			½	½	0	1	1	1	½	½	1	½	½	½	1	½
2 (Note: SB scores)	Koneru Humpy (IND)	7.5 / 14	52.25	3		½	½			0	1	1	½	½	½	½	½	1	0	½	½
3	Lei Tingjie (CHN)	7.5 / 14	52	4		0	1	0	1			1	0	½	1	½	½	½	½	½	½
4	Vaishali Rameshbabu (IND)	7.5 / 14	47.5	6		0	0	½	0	1	0			1	½	0	1	1	1	½	1
5	Aleksandra Goryachkina (FIDE)	7 / 14	47	2		½	½	½	½	0	½	½	0			½	½	½	1	1	½
6	Kateryna Lagno (FIDE)	6.5 / 14	45	1		½	0	½	½	½	½	0	1	½	½			½	½	½	½
7 (Note: SB scores)	Nurgyul Salimova (BUL)	5.5 / 14	39.5	1		½	½	1	0	½	½	0	0	0	½	½	½			½	½
8	Anna Muzychuk (UKR)	5.5 / 14	38.75	0		½	0	½	½	½	½	0	½	½	0	½	½	½	½		

Tie-breakers for first place: (1) results in tie-break games for first place;

Tie breakers for non-first place: (1) results in tie-break games for first place, if any; (2) Sonneborn–Berger score (SB); (3) total number of wins; (4) head-to-head score among tied players; (5) drawing of lots.

Note: Numbers in the crosstable in a white background indicate the result playing the respective opponent with the white pieces (black pieces if on a black background). This does not give information which of the two games was played in the first half of the tournament, and which in the second.

=== Points by round ===
This table shows each player's cumulative difference between their number of wins and losses after each round. Green backgrounds indicate the player(s) with the highest score after each round. Red backgrounds indicate player(s) who could no longer win the tournament after each round. (Note: Players are marked in red if there is no permutation of remaining results that allows them to catch up the tournament leader(s) after remaining rounds.)

Rank	Player	Rounds													
Rank	Player	1	2	3	4	5	6	7	8	9	10	11	12	13	14
1	Tan Zhongyi (CHN)	+1	+2	+2	+2	+2	+3	+3	+2	+3	+3	+4	+4	+4	+4
2	Koneru Humpy (IND)	=	=	=	–1	–1	–2	–2	–1	−1	−1	=	=	=	+1
3	Lei Tingjie (CHN)	–1	–1	–1	–1	–1	=	+1	+2	+2	+3	+3	+3	+2	+1
4	Vaishali Rameshbabu (IND)	=	–1	=	=	=	–1	–2	–3	−4	−3	−2	–1	=	+1
5	Aleksandra Goryachkina (FIDE)	=	+1	+1	+1	+1	+2	+2	+2	+2	+1	=	=	=	=
6	Kateryna Lagno (FIDE)	=	=	=	=	=	+1	+1	+1	+1	+1	=	=	=	–1
7	Nurgyul Salimova (BUL)	=	=	–1	=	=	–1	–1	–1	−1	−2	−3	–3	–3	–3
8	Anna Muzychuk (UKR)	=	–1	–1	–1	–1	–2	–2	–2	−2	−2	−2	–3	–3	–3

=== Pairings by round ===
First named player is white. 1–0 indicates a white win, 0–1 indicates a black win, and ½–½ indicates a draw. Numbers in parentheses show players' scores prior to the round. Final column indicates opening played, sourced from Lichess.

Round 1 (4 April 2024)
Aleksandra Goryachkina	½–½	Kateryna Lagno	B30 Sicilian Rossolimo
Anna Muzychuk	½–½	Nurgyul Salimova	C43 Petrov Steinitz
Lei Tingjie	0–1	Tan Zhongyi	D35 QGD Exchange
Vaishali Rameshbabu	½–½	Koneru Humpy	C54 Giuoco Pianissimo
Round 2 (5 April 2024)
Kateryna Lagno (½)	½–½	Koneru Humpy (½)	C88 Ruy Lopez Closed
Tan Zhongyi (1)	1–0	Vaishali Rameshbabu (½)	D01 Rapport–Jobava London
Nurgyul Salimova (½)	½–½	Lei Tingjie (0)	D27 QGA Classical
Aleksandra Goryachkina (½)	1–0	Anna Muzychuk (½)	D10 Slav Exchange
Round 3 (6 April 2024)
Anna Muzychuk (½)	½–½	Kateryna Lagno (1)	C88 Ruy Lopez Closed
Lei Tingjie (½)	½–½	Aleksandra Goryachkina (1½)	C51 Evans Gambit
Vaishali Rameshbabu (½)	1–0	Nurgyul Salimova (1)	C42 Petrov Classical
Koneru Humpy (1)	½–½	Tan Zhongyi (2)	A08 Reversed Grünfeld
Round 4 (7 April 2024)
Kateryna Lagno (1½)	½–½	Tan Zhongyi (2½)	B92 Sicilian Najdorf
Nurgyul Salimova (1)	1–0	Koneru Humpy (1½)	E06 Closed Catalan
Aleksandra Goryachkina (2)	½–½	Vaishali Rameshbabu (1½)	D33 Tarrasch Defense
Anna Muzychuk (1)	½–½	Lei Tingjie (1)	C01 French Exchange
Round 5 (9 April 2024)
Lei Tingjie (1½)	½–½	Kateryna Lagno (2)	C55 Two Knights Defense
Vaishali Rameshbabu (2)	½–½	Anna Muzychuk (1½)	C50 Giuoco Pianissimo
Koneru Humpy (1½)	½–½	Aleksandra Goryachkina (2½)	D40 Semi-Tarrasch Defence
Tan Zhongyi (3)	½–½	Nurgyul Salimova (2)	B12 Caro–Kann Advance
Round 6 (10 April 2024)
Vaishali Rameshbabu (2½)	0–1	Kateryna Lagno (2½)	C89 Ruy Lopez Marshall
Koneru Humpy (2)	0–1	Lei Tingjie (2)	E97 King's Indian Defense
Tan Zhongyi (3½)	1–0	Anna Muzychuk (2)	D05 Colle System
Nurgyul Salimova (2½)	0–1	Aleksandra Goryachkina (3)	E05 Open Catalan
Round 7 (11 April 2024)
Kateryna Lagno (3½)	½–½	Nurgyul Salimova (2½)	C60 Ruy Lopez Cozio
Aleksandra Goryachkina (4)	½–½	Tan Zhongyi (4½)	D30 Queen's Gambit Declined
Anna Muzychuk (2)	½–½	Koneru Humpy (2)	C70 Ruy Lopez Cozio Deferred
Lei Tingjie (3)	1–0	Vaishali Rameshbabu (2½)	C50 Giuoco Pianissimo

Round 8 (13 April 2024)
Kateryna Lagno (4)	½–½	Aleksandra Goryachkina (4½)	C78 Ruy Lopez Møller
Nurgyul Salimova (3)	½–½	Anna Muzychuk (2½)	D30 Queen's Gambit Declined
Tan Zhongyi (5)	0–1	Lei Tingjie (4)	D02 London System
Koneru Humpy (2½)	1–0	Vaishali Rameshbabu (2½)	D81 Grünfeld Defense
Round 9 (14 April 2024)
Koneru Humpy (3½)	½–½	Kateryna Lagno (4½)	D38 Queen's Gambit Declined
Vaishali Rameshbabu (2½)	0–1	Tan Zhongyi (5)	B22 Sicilian Defence
Lei Tingjie (5)	½–½	Nurgyul Salimova (3½)	C41 Philidor Defence
Anna Muzychuk (3)	½–½	Aleksandra Goryachkina (5)	C67 Ruy Lopez
Round 10 (15 April 2024)
Kateryna Lagno (5)	½–½	Anna Muzychuk (3½)	C88 Ruy Lopez
Aleksandra Goryachkina (5½)	0–1	Lei Tingjie (5½)	D10 Queen's Gambit Declined
Nurgyul Salimova (4)	0–1	Vaishali Rameshbabu (2½)	D70 Neo-Grünfeld Defence
Tan Zhongyi (6)	½–½	Koneru Humpy (4)	C45 Scotch Game
Round 11 (17 April 2024)
Tan Zhongyi (6½)	1–0	Kateryna Lagno (5½)	A05 King's Indian Attack
Koneru Humpy (4½)	1–0	Nurgyul Salimova (4)	D12 Slav Defence
Vaishali Rameshbabu (3½)	1–0	Aleksandra Goryachkina (5½)	B22 Sicilian Alapin
Lei Tingjie (6½)	½–½	Anna Muzychuk (4)	C54 Giuoco Pianissimo
Round 12 (18 April 2024)
Kateryna Lagno (5½)	½–½	Lei Tingjie (7)	C02 French Advance
Anna Muzychuk (4½)	0–1	Vaishali Rameshbabu (4½)	C80 Ruy Lopez Open
Aleksandra Goryachkina (5½)	½–½	Koneru Humpy (5½)	E05 Open Catalan
Nurgyul Salimova (4)	½–½	Tan Zhongyi (7½)	A07 King's Indian Attack
Round 13 (20 April 2024)
Nurgyul Salimova (4½)	½–½	Kateryna Lagno (6)	E05 Catalan Opening
Tan Zhongyi (8)	½–½	Aleksandra Goryachkina (6)	D50 Queen's Gambit Declined
Koneru Humpy (6)	½–½	Anna Muzychuk (4½)	D30 Queen's Gambit Declined
Vaishali Rameshbabu (5½)	1–0	Lei Tingjie (7½)	B51 Sicilian Defence
Round 14 (21 April 2024)
Kateryna Lagno (6½)	0–1	Vaishali Rameshbabu (6½)	C77 Ruy Lopez Anderssen
Lei Tingjie (7½)	0–1	Koneru Humpy (6½)	E24 Nimzo-Indian, Sämisch
Anna Muzychuk (5)	½–½	Tan Zhongyi (8½)	B32 Sicilian Defence
Aleksandra Goryachkina (6½)	½–½	Nurgyul Salimova (5)	C41 Philidor Defence

== See also ==
- Candidates Tournament 2024
