= Women's Candidates Tournament 2022–23 =

Women's World Chess Championship qualifying event

FIDE Women's Candidates 2022–23
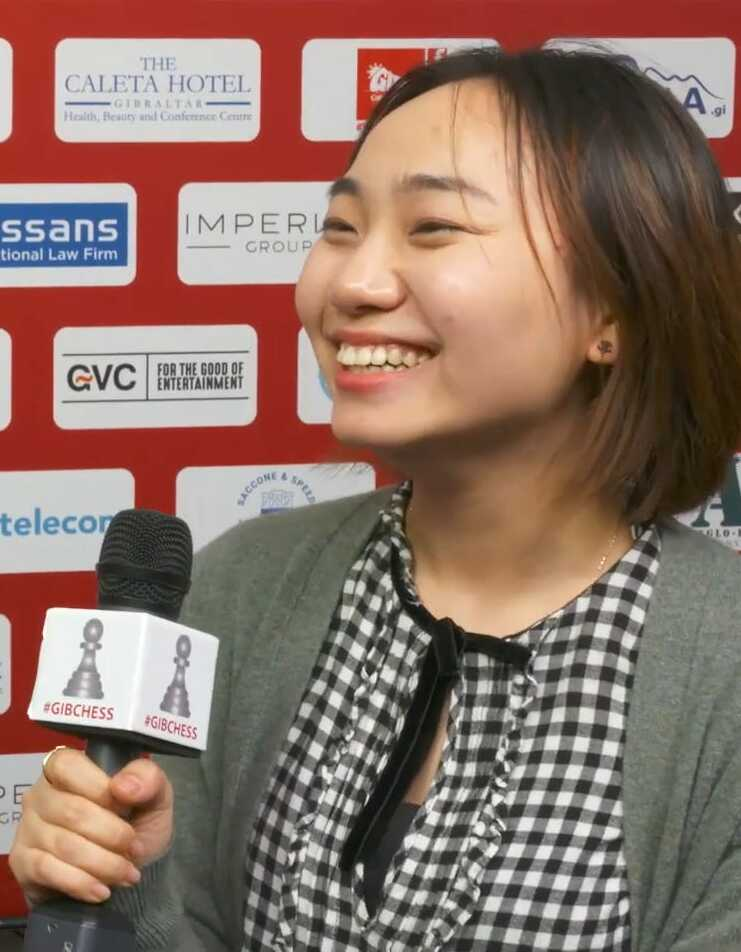
- Lei Tingjie, the winner of the tournament, advanced to the Women's World Chess Championship 2023 match.
- Location: Monaco (First stage, Pool A); Khiva (First stage, Pool B); Chongqing (Final)
- Dates: 24 October – 11 December 2022 (First stage); 27 March to 6 April 2023 (Final)
- Competitors: 8 from 4 nations

Champion
- (China) Lei Tingjie

The FIDE Women's Candidates Tournament 2022–23 was an eight-player chess tournament held to determine the challenger for the Women's World Chess Championship 2023. The first stage of the tournament, consisting of the quarterfinals and semifinals, was held from 24 October to 6 November 2022 in Monaco, and from 29 November to 11 December in Khiva.

The second stage, i.e. the Candidates final, took place in Chongqing, China from 27 March to 6 April 2023. Lei Tingjie won the match with a round to spare.

Lei moved on to challenge the defending Women's World Chess Champion Ju Wenjun, but lost the match in game 12.

== Participants ==
The eight players who qualified for the Women's Candidates Tournament were:

Qualification method	Player	Women's world no. (Jun 2022)	Rating on Jun 2022	Women's World champion
2020 World Championship runner-up	(FIDE) Aleksandra Goryachkina (Note: Russian players' flags are displayed as the FIDE flag, as FIDE banned Russian and Belarusian flags from FIDE-rated events in response to the Russian invasion of Ukraine.)	2	2599	
The top two finishers in the FIDE Women's Grand Prix 2019–2021	(India) Koneru Humpy	− (Note: Not included in the rating list because of inactive rating)	2586	
The top two finishers in the FIDE Women's Grand Prix 2019–2021	(FIDE) Kateryna Lagno	4	2547	
The top three finishers in the Women's Chess World Cup 2021	(FIDE) Alexandra Kosteniuk	11	2510	2008
The top three finishers in the Women's Chess World Cup 2021	(China) Tan Zhongyi	9	2525	2017
The top three finishers in the Women's Chess World Cup 2021	(Ukraine) Anna Muzychuk	8	2529	
The top finisher in the FIDE Women's Grand Swiss Tournament 2021	(China) Lei Tingjie	6	2535	
The highest-rated player on the January 2022 standard rating list	(Ukraine) Mariya Muzychuk	5	2540	2015

== Results ==
In June 2022, FIDE announced the pairings for the quarterfinals. It has been speculated that these pairings were made to prevent a Russia vs Ukraine matchup before the final.

Quarterfinals (best of 4)
(India) Koneru Humpy	3½
(Ukraine) Anna Muzychuk	4½
Pool A (Monaco)
(China) Lei Tingjie	2½
(Ukraine) Mariya Muzychuk	1½
(FIDE) Aleksandra Goryachkina	2½
(FIDE) Alexandra Kosteniuk	1½
Pool B (Khiva)
(FIDE) Kateryna Lagno	3½
(China) Tan Zhongyi	4½

Semifinals (best of 4)
(Ukraine) Anna Muzychuk	1½
(China) Lei Tingjie	2½
(FIDE) Aleksandra Goryachkina	1½
(China) Tan Zhongyi	2½

Final (best of 6)
(China) Lei Tingjie	3½
(China) Tan Zhongyi	1½

== See also ==
- Candidates Tournament 2022
