= Women's Chess World Cup 2000 =

Chess tournament in Shenyang, China

First Chess World Cup
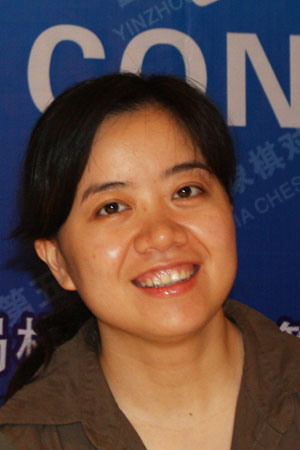
- Inaugural Women's World Cup winner Xu Yuhua

Tournament information
- Sport: Chess
- Location: Shenyang, China
- Dates: 1 September 2000–13 September 2000
- Administrator: FIDE
- Tournament format: Multi-stage tournament
- Host: Chinese Chess Association
- Participants: 24
- Purse: $168,000

Final positions
- Champion: (China) Xu Yuhua
- Runner-up: (Ukraine) Natalia Zhukova

The FIDE Women's World Cup 2000 was a 24-player chess tournament played between 1 September and 13 September 2000 in Shenyang, China. The tournament was organized by FIDE and hosted by the Chinese Chess Association. It was hosted alongside the first Chess World World Cup. Xu Yuhua defeated Natalia Zhukova in the final to win the inaugural title and $30,000.

== Format ==
The 24 players were split into four round-robin groups of six players each. The top two finishers in each group qualified for the knockout stages. Ties were resolved by playoffs. From the quarterfinals onward, each knockout match consisted of two games, with ties being broken by a set of speed games.

== Participants ==
1. Xie Jun (CHN), 2568, GM
2. Maia Chiburdanidze (GEO), 2545, GM
3. Zhu Chen (CHN), 2539, WGM
4. Antoaneta Stefanova (BUL), 2514, IM
5. Xu Yuhua (CHN), 2506, WIM
6. Wang Pin (CHN), 2502, WGM
7. Qin Kanying (CHN), 2501, WGM
8. Wang Lei (CHN), 2498, WGM
9. Hoang Thanh Trang (VIE), 2489, IM
10. Pia Cramling (SWE), 2484, GM
11. Ekaterina Kovalevskaya (RUS), 2475, WGM
12. Almira Skripchenko (MDA), 2450, IM
13. Natalia Zhukova (UKR), 2450, WGM
14. Alisa Maric (YUG), 2443, IM
15. Nino Khurtsidze (GEO), 2443, IM
16. Wang Yu (CHN), 2401, WFM
17. Alexandra Kosteniuk (RUS), 2398, IM
18. Regina Pokorna (SVK), 2363, WIM
19. Irina Krush (USA), 2354, WGM
20. Claudia Amura (ARG), 2351, WGM
21. Yadira Hernandez (MEX), 2258, WFM
22. Amelie Payet (SEY), 2010
23. Anzel Laubscher (RSA), unrated
24. Knarik Jacob Mouradian (LIB), unrated

Ratings are as per the July 2000 FIDE ratings list.

== Calendar ==
| Round | Dates |
|---|---|
| Group Stage | 1-5 September |
| Quarterfinals | 7-8 September |
| Semifinals | 9-10 September |
| Final | 12-13 September |

== Group stage ==
The reigning Women's World Champion Xie Jun did not advance out of her group, losing to the eventual group winner Hoang Thanh Trang. Out of the four top seeds, the only one to advance out of her group was Zhu Chen.

| Group A | Pts. | Group B | Pts. | Group C | Pts. | Group D | Pts. |
|---|---|---|---|---|---|---|---|
| (China) Zhu Chen | 4½ | (China) Wang Pin | 3½ | (China) Wang Yu | 4 | (Vietnam) Hoang Thanh Trang | 3½ |
| (China) Xu Yuhua | 3½ | (China) Qin Kanying | 3½ | (Sweden) Pia Cramling | 3½ | (Ukraine) Natalia Zhukova | 3½ |
| (Russia) Ekaterina Kovalevskaya | 2½ | (Moldova) Almira Skripchenko | 3½ | (Georgia (country)) Nino Khurtsidze | 3½ | (China) Xie Jun | 3 |
| (Slovakia) Regina Pokorna | 2½ | (Bulgaria) Antoaneta Stefanova | 2½ | (Georgia (country)) Maia Chiburdanidze | 2½ | (United States) Irina Krush | 2½ |
| (Socialist Federal Republic of Yugoslavia) Alisa Maric | 2 | (Argentina) Claudia Amura | 2 | (Russia) Alexandra Kosteniuk | 1½ | (China) Wang Lei | 1½ |
| (Seychelles) Amelie Payet | 0 | (Lebanon) Knarik Jacob Mouradian | 0 | (South Africa) Anzel Laubscher | 0 | (Mexico) Yadira Hernandez | 1 |

== Playoffs ==
Quarterfinals
(China) Zhu Chen | ½
(Sweden) Pia Cramling | 1½
(China) Wang Yu | ½
(China) Xu Yuhua | 1½
(China) Wang Pin | ½
(Ukraine) Natalia Zhukova | 1½
(Vietnam) Hoang Thanh Trang | 1½
(China) Qin Kanying | ½

Semifinals
(Sweden) Pia Cramling | 2
(China) Xu Yuhua | 3
(Ukraine) Natalia Zhukova | 1½
(Vietnam) Hoang Thanh Trang | ½

Final
(China) Xu Yuhua | 1½
(Ukraine) Natalia Zhukova | ½

=== Final ===
Xu Yuhua won the second game of the final with White in 74 moves. She played the Alekhine's Defence.

| Name | Rating | 1 | 2 | Total |
|---|---|---|---|---|
| Xu Yuhua (CHN) | 2506 | ½ | 1 | 1½ |
| Natalia Zhukova (UKR) | 2450 | ½ | 0 | ½ |
