= Chess World Cup 2000 =

Chess tournament in Shenyang, China

First Chess World Cup
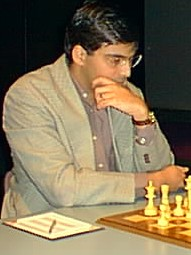
- Viswanathan Anand

Tournament information
- Sport: Chess
- Location: Shenyang, China
- Dates: 1 September 2000–13 September 2000
- Administrator: FIDE
- Tournament format: Multi-stage tournament
- Host: Chinese Chess Association
- Participants: 24
- Purse: $200,000

Final positions
- Champion: (India) Viswanathan Anand
- Runner-up: (Russia) Evgeny Bareev

The FIDE World Cup 2000 was a 24-player Category XVI chess tournament played between 1 September and 13 September 2000 in Shenyang, China. The tournament was organized by FIDE, hosted by the Chinese Chess Association, and billed as the First Chess World Cup. Viswanathan Anand defeated Evgeny Bareev in the final to win the inaugural title and a $50,000 cash prize. It was hosted alongside the first Women's Chess World Cup.

== Format ==
The 24 players were split into four groups of six players each, with every player playing each other player in his group once. The top two finishers in each group were sent forward to the knockout stages, with ties being resolved by playoffs. From the quarterfinals onward, each knockout match consisted of two games, with ties being broken by a set of speed games.

== Participants ==
All players are Grandmasters unless indicated otherwise.

1. Viswanathan Anand (IND), 2762
2. Alexander Morozevich (RUS), 2756
3. Vassily Ivanchuk (UKR), 2719
4. Evgeny Bareev (RUS), 2702
5. Peter Svidler (RUS), 2689
6. Boris Gelfand (ISR), 2681
7. Nigel Short (ENG), 2677
8. Alexey Dreev (RUS), 2676
9. Zurab Azmaiparashvili (GEO), 2673
10. Ye Jiangchuan (CHN), 2670
11. Xu Jun (CHN), 2668
12. Alexander Khalifman (RUS), 2667
13. Mikhail Gurevich (BEL), 2667
14. Sergei Movsesian (CZE), 2666
15. Vladislav Tkachiev (FRA), 2657
16. Alexei Fedorov (BLR), 2646
17. Boris Gulko (USA), 2643
18. Zhang Zhong (CHN), 2636
19. Gilberto Milos (BRA), 2633
20. Ruslan Ponomariov (UKR), 2630
21. Pavel Tregubov (RUS), 2620
22. Aleksej Aleksandrov (BLR), 2591
23. Aimen Rizouk (ALG), 2350, IM
24. Mohamed Tissir (MAR), 2342, IM

Ratings are as per the July 2000 FIDE ratings list.

== Calendar ==
Round	Dates
Group Stage	1-5 September
Quarterfinals	7-8 September
Semifinals	9-10 September
Final	12-13 September

== Group stage ==
Nine out of the top 10 seeds finished the group stages with a plus or equal score – the lone exception, Alexander Morozevich, crashed out of the tournament with a single point in 5 games. The reigning FIDE World Champion Alexander Khalifman also suffered a disappointing showing, with losses to Anand and Gelfand. The dark horse of the tournament was 19th-seeded Gilberto Milos, a chess grandmaster from Brazil and five-time South American chess champion. Milos' upset win over Morozevich would propel him to the top of Group A, and eventually, into the semifinals of the World Cup. The top seed in each of the other groups advanced to the quarterfinals.

Group A	Pts.	Group B	Pts.	Group C	Pts.	Group D	Pts.
(Brazil) Gilberto Milos	3½	(China) Ye Jiangchuan	3½	(Russia) Evgeny Bareev	3½	(India) Viswanathan Anand	3½
(Georgia (country)) Zurab Azmaiparashvili	3	(Ukraine) Vassily Ivanchuk	3	(Czech Republic) Sergei Movsesian	3	(Israel) Boris Gelfand	3
(United States) Boris Gulko	2½	(England) Nigel Short	3	(Russia) Peter Svidler	3	(France) Vladislav Tkachiev	3
(Russia) Alexey Dreev	2½	(Belgium) Mikhail Gurevich	2	(China) Zhang Zhong	2½	(Russia) Pavel Tregubov	2½
(Belarus) Aleksej Aleksandrov	2½	(China) Xu Jun	2	(Belarus) Alexei Fedorov	2	(Russia) Alexander Khalifman	2
(Russia) Alexander Morozevich	1	(Ukraine) Ruslan Ponomariov	1½	(Algeria) Aimen Rizouk	1	(Morocco) Mohamed Tissir	1

== Playoffs ==
Anand, the tournament's hitherto-untroubled No. 1 seed, breezed through the quarterfinal round against his longtime rival Vassily Ivanchuk. But Boris Gelfand gave Anand a challenge in the semi-final, and the match was not settled until a sudden-death blitz game. In the other half of the bracket, Bareev dropped the first game but managed to win his quarterfinal match against Azmaiparashvili before facing a relentless Gilberto Milos in the semifinals. Bareev eventually edged past the Brazilian, drawing both classical games before winning the first rapid playoff thanks to a distressing blunder (79. Nd5??) from Milos that cost him his queen and the match.

Quarterfinals
(India) Viswanathan Anand	1½
(Ukraine) Vassily Ivanchuk	½
(Israel) Boris Gelfand	2½
(China) Ye Jiangchuan	1½
(Czech Republic) Sergei Movsesian	2
(Brazil) Gilberto Milos	3
(Georgia (country)) Zurab Azmaiparashvili	1½
(Russia) Evgeny Bareev	2½

Semifinals
(India) Viswanathan Anand	3½
(Israel) Boris Gelfand	2½
(Brazil) Gilberto Milos	1½
(Russia) Evgeny Bareev	2½

Final
(India) Viswanathan Anand	1½
(Russia) Evgeny Bareev	½

=== Final ===
Anand–Bareev, 2000 World Cup

Position: e8 white knight, a7 black pawn, f7 black king, h7 black pawn, d6 white rook, c5 white pawn, b4 white pawn, c4 white king, f4 white pawn, g4 black pawn, a2 white pawn, e2 black pawn, h2 white pawn

Final game, after 37...e2; Anand played 38 Rf6+ and Bareev resigned (38... Ke7 39 f5 e1=Q 40 Re6+)

The first game of the World Cup final between Viswanathan Anand and Evgeny Bareev played out to a draw after 33 moves. In the second game, Anand – playing the white side of the French defence – sacrificed the exchange for two pawns to gain a slight advantage. But Bareev's fate was not sealed until 36... Re8?? - a shocking blunder that gave Anand a completely winning position.

Name	Rating	1	2	Total
Viswanathan Anand (IND)	2762	½	1	1½
Evgeny Bareev (RUS)	2702	½	0	½
