= Madara Golsta =

Latvian chess player (born 2003)

Personal information
- Born: 13 February 2003 (age 23)

Chess career
- Country: Latvia
- Peak rating: 2039 (August 2019)

Madara Golsta (born 13 February 2003) is a Latvian chess player. She is a Latvian Women's Chess Championships medalist in 2020 and 2021.

== Biography ==
Together with her twin sister Ramona, Madara Golsta was a student of chess trainer Aivars Stašāns (1954–2021). She was multiple winner of Latvian Youth Chess Championships in different age groups of girls, where she won 2 first places (2019 in M16 age group, 2020 in M18 age group), 4 second places (2013 in M10 age group, 2015 in M12 age group, 2016 in M14 age group, 2018 in M18 age group) and a third place (2017 M14 age group). Madara Golsta represented Latvia in World Youth Chess Championships and European Youth Chess Championships, where she achieved the best result in 2013, which ranked 23rd in the M10 age group at the World Youth Chess Championship.

Since 2017, Madara Golsta has participated in the Latvian Women's Chess Championships, where she has won silver (2021) and bronze (2020) medals.

In April 2017, in Riga Madara Golsta ranked in 127th place in Women's European Individual Chess Championship.

In 2019, in Batumi she played for Latvia in Women's European Team Chess Championship at reserve board (+2, =1, -2).

In November 2021, in Riga Madara Golsta ranked in 48th place in FIDE Women's Grand Swiss Tournament 2021.
