= Maria Eizaguerri Floris =

Spanish chess player

Personal information
- Born: 2004 (age 21–22)

Chess career
- Country: Spain
- Title: FIDE Master (2021); Woman FIDE Master (2016)
- Peak rating: 2328 (September 2021)

Maria Eizaguerri Floris (born 2004) is a Spanish chess player who holds the title of FIDE Master (FM, 2021).

== Biography ==
Represented Spain in the European Youth Chess Championship in various age groups of girls. She achieved her best result in 2012 in Prague, when she won 4th place in the U8 girls group.

Represented the Spanish team in major team chess tournaments:

- In the FIDE Online Chess Olympiad participated 2 times (2020-2021);,
- In European Team Chess Championship participated in 2021;
- In World Team Chess Championship participated in 2021.

In November 2021 in Riga Maria Eizaguerri Floris ranked in 49th place in FIDE Women's Grand Swiss Tournament 2021.
