= FIDE Grand Swiss Tournament =

Chess tournament

The FIDE Grand Swiss Tournament is a Swiss-system chess tournament, forming part of the qualification for the World Chess Championship.

== Editions and winners ==
The players who qualified for the Candidates Tournament are marked with a green background. The players who otherwise qualified for the Candidates Tournament before the start of the Grand Swiss Tournament are marked with a purple background. In 2019, Alekseenko emerging third in the Grand Swiss made him eligible for the wild card nomination, which is how he qualified to the Candidates Tournament 2020–2021. The first three editions were organized by Isle of Man International Chess Limited, and sponsored by the Scheinberg family.

Edition	Host city	Players	Winner	Runner-up	Third
2019	(Isle of Man) Santon	154	(China) Wang Hao	(United States) Fabiano Caruana	(Russia) Kirill Alekseenko
2021	(Latvia) Riga	108	(France) Alireza Firouzja	(United States) Fabiano Caruana	(Russia) Grigoriy Oparin
2023	(Isle of Man) Douglas	114	(India) Vidit Gujrathi	(United States) Hikaru Nakamura	(FIDE) Andrey Esipenko
2025	(Uzbekistan) Samarkand	116	(Netherlands) Anish Giri	(Germany) Matthias Blübaum	(France) Alireza Firouzja

=== Predecessor ===
The FIDE Grand Swiss was preceded by the Isle of Man International Chess Tournament, which was held annually from 2014 to 2018. The tournament was co-organized by the English Chess Federation. It was sponsored by PokerStars until 2015, and then by Chess.com, which also sponsored the first two editions of the Grand Swiss. All the editions were played at the Villa Marina in Douglas.

The first edition in 2014 was won by Nigel Short, who finished a full point ahead of the field, scoring 7.5/9. In 2015, Pentala Harikrishna won on tiebreaks ahead of Laurent Fressinet and Gabriel Sargissian, all on 7/9. The 2016 edition featured a very strong field including Fabiano Caruana, Wesley So, Hikaru Nakamura and Michael Adams. Pavel Eljanov and Caruana both scored 7.5/9, with Eljanov winning on tiebreak.

The 2017 edition was one of the strongest open events in chess history, with a field that including World Champion Magnus Carlsen, as well as Vladimir Kramnik, Caruana, Viswanathan Anand, Nakamura and Adams. Carlsen won with a score of 7.5/9, half a point ahead of Anand and Nakamura. In 2018, Radosław Wojtaszek beat Arkadij Naiditsch in a playoff after both scored 7/9.

== See also ==
- FIDE Women's Grand Swiss Tournament
- World Chess Championship
- FIDE Grand Prix
- Chess World Cup
