= Women's World Chess Championship 2023 =

Chess match between Ju Wenjun and Lei Tingjie

- Shanghai & Chongqing, China
- 5–24 July 2023
| | Defending champion | Challenger |
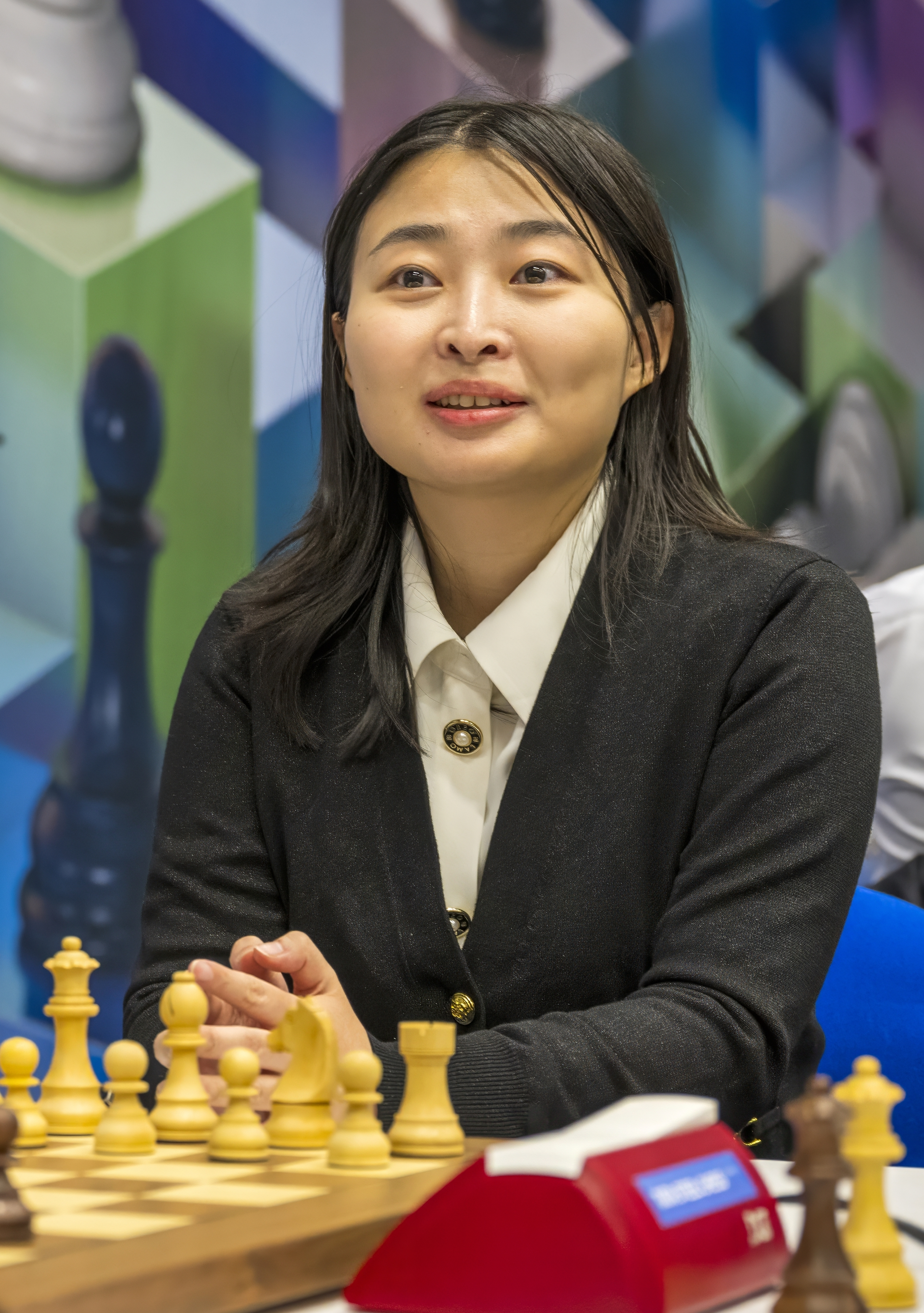
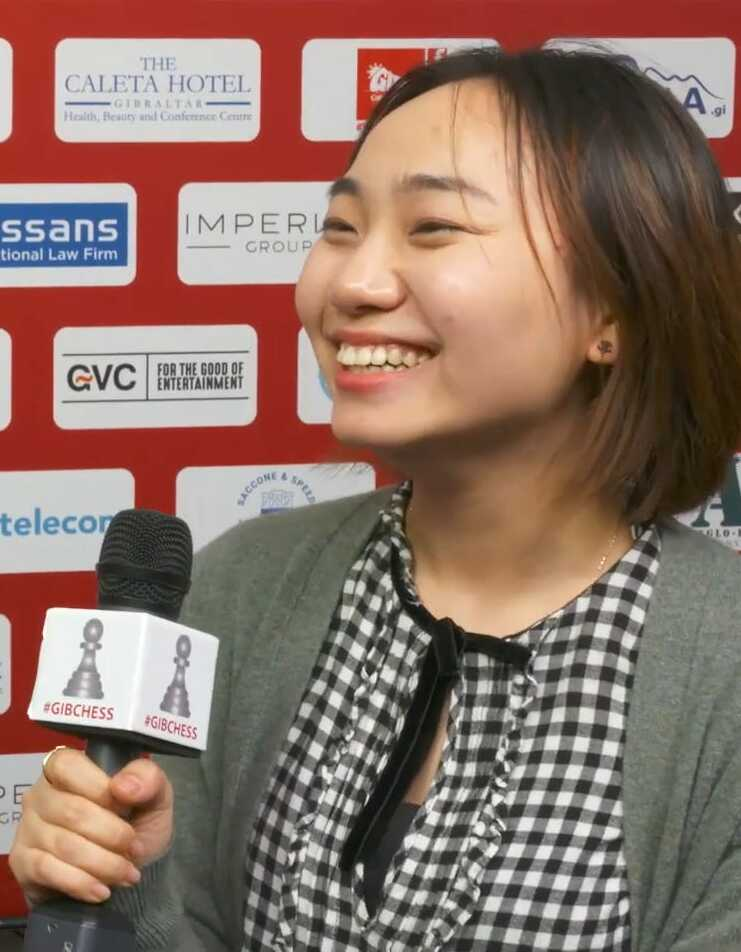
| | (China) Ju Wenjun | (China) Lei Tingjie |
| | 6½ | Scores | 5½ |
| Game 1 | ½ | 50 move draw | ½ |
| Game 2 | ½ | 40 move draw | ½ |
| Game 3 | ½ | 49 move draw | ½ |
| Game 4 | ½ | 63 move draw | ½ |
| Game 5 | 0 | 65 moves → | 1 |
| Game 6 | ½ | 48 move draw | ½ |
| Game 7 | ½ | 65 move draw | ½ |
| Game 8 | 1 | ← 72 moves | 0 |
| Game 9 | ½ | 59 move draw | ½ |
| Game 10 | ½ | 47 move draw | ½ |
| Game 11 | ½ | 48 move draw | ½ |
| Game 12 | 1 | ← 62 moves | 0 |
| | Born 31 January 1991; 32 years old | Born 13 March 1997; 26 years old |
| | Winner of the Women's World Chess Championship 2020 | Winner of the Women's Candidates Tournament 2022–23 |
| | Rating: 2564 (World No. 2) | Rating: 2554 (World No. 4) |

The 2023 Women's World Chess Championship was a chess match for the Women's World Chess Championship title. It was contested by the defending champion, Ju Wenjun, and her challenger, Lei Tingjie, the winner of the 2022–23 Candidates tournament.

It was played from 5 to 24 July 2023, in the hometowns of the two participants, giving each a home-field advantage for half the match.

Ju won the match and successfully defended her title.

== Candidates tournament ==
The second edition of the women's Candidates was played in the last quarter of 2022. In contrast to the previous edition, this was played in a knock-out format. It has been speculated that the pairings were made to prevent a Russia vs Ukraine matchup before the final.

Quarterfinals (best of 4)
(India) Koneru Humpy | 3½
(Ukraine) Anna Muzychuk | 4½
Pool A (Monaco)
(China) Lei Tingjie | 2½
(Ukraine) Mariya Muzychuk | 1½
(FIDE) Aleksandra Goryachkina | 2½
(FIDE) Alexandra Kosteniuk | 1½
Pool B (Khiva)
(FIDE) Kateryna Lagno | 3½
(China) Tan Zhongyi | 4½

Semifinals (best of 4)
(Ukraine) Anna Muzychuk | 1½
(China) Lei Tingjie | 2½
(FIDE) Aleksandra Goryachkina | 1½
(China) Tan Zhongyi | 2½

Final (best of 6)
(China) Lei Tingjie | 3½
(China) Tan Zhongyi | 1½

It featured eight players, including three former Women's World champions. In the final, Lei Tingjie and Tan Zhongyi played a six-game match to determine the Challenger spot. Lei Tingjie won the match in 5 games.

== Match ==
The match was scheduled for 5 to 25 July 2023. As in 2018, it was played in two halves, giving each player a home advantage for half the match. The host cities were hometowns of the participants, Chongqing and Shanghai. Shanghai hosted the first half and Chongqing the second.

The format of the championship was a 12-game match as in previous years.

English-language commentators on Chess.com included Jovanka Houska, Alexandra Kosteniuk, Daniel Naroditsky and Judit Polgar. FIDE commentators were Alik Gershon and Xu Yi.

=== Seconds ===
Ju's seconds were Pentala Harikrishna and Wei Yi, while Lei's seconds were Teimour Radjabov and Raymond Song.

=== Schedule ===
- 4 July: Opening Ceremony (Shanghai)
- 5 and 6 July: Games 1 and 2
- 8 and 9 July: Games 3 and 4
- 11 and 12 July: Games 5 and 6
- 13 July: Transfer to Chongqing
- 15 and 16 July: Games 7 and 8
- 18 and 19 July: Games 9 and 10
- 21 and 22 July: Games 11 and 12
- 23 July: Tiebreaks (if needed)
- 24 July: Closing Ceremony

Games start at 3 p.m. local time (07:00 UTC).

=== Results ===
At the opening ceremony, Lei Tingjie received the white pieces for the first game of the match, with colors alternating after every game.

From 2023 to 2024, both the Open World Chess Champion (Ding Liren) and Women's World Chess Champion were from China.

Women's World Chess Championship 2023
| Player | Rating | Standard Time Control | | | | | | | | | | | | Points |
| Player | Rating | 1 | 2 | 3 | 4 | 5 | 6 | 7 | 8 | 9 | 10 | 11 | 12 | Points |
|---|---|---|---|---|---|---|---|---|---|---|---|---|---|---|
| Ju Wenjun (China) | 2564 | ½ | ½ | ½ | ½ | 0 | ½ | ½ | 1 | ½ | ½ | ½ | 1 | 6½ |
| Lei Tingjie (China) | 2554 | ½ | ½ | ½ | ½ | 1 | ½ | ½ | 0 | ½ | ½ | ½ | 0 | 5½ |
| Game Links | | | | | | | | | | | | | | |
