= Natalia Zhukova =

Ukrainian chess grandmaster (born 1979)

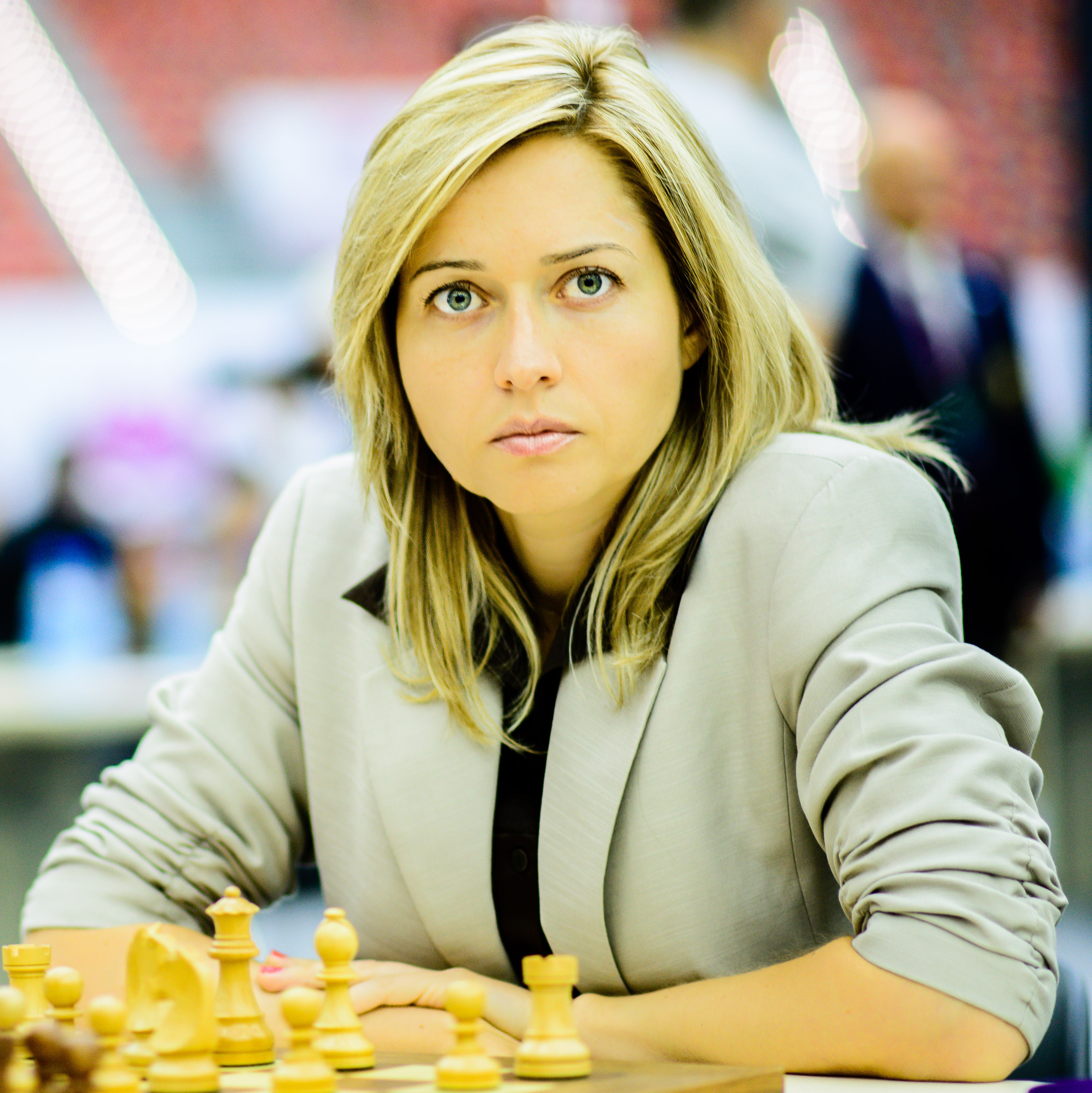
- Zhukova at the 42nd Chess Olympiad in 2016

Personal information
- Born: Natalia Oleksandrivna Zhukova; 5 June 1979 (age 47) Dresden, East Germany
- Spouse: Alexander Grischuk (m. 2004, divorced)

Chess career
- Country: Ukraine
- Title: Grandmaster (2010)
- Peak rating: 2499 (May 2010)

Natalia Oleksandrivna Zhukova (Ukrainian: Наталія Олександрівна Жукова; born 5 June 1979) is a Ukrainian chess grandmaster and two-time European women's champion. She won several age-group titles as a teenager, at both the European and world levels. She has also won several international women's tournaments. Zhukova has played for the Ukrainian women's national team since age 17 in 1996, the same year she won the Ukrainian women's championship in her debut. She played board one on the winning Ukrainian team at the 2006 Women's Chess Olympiad.

== Early years ==
Zhukova was just 12 years old when she made her debut at the World Youth Championship level at Mamaia 1991, tying for 3rd–4th place in the Girls' U12 group with 7½/11. She won the European Youth Championship for Girls U14 at Szombathely 1993 with 7½/9. She won the European Championship for Girls U16 at Herculane 1994 with 7/9. She won the World Championship for Girls U16 at Szeged 1994 with 7/9. She placed 2nd in the World Championship for Girls U20 at Halle 1995 with 9/12. She debuted at the Interzonal level at Kishinev 1995, finishing in the middle of the field with 6½/13.

== Ukrainian women's championship at 16 ==
Zhukova was the youngest player in the field when she made her debut in 1996 at the Ukrainian women's level. She tied for 1st–2nd places in the championship with 6/10 and was second to Tatiana Melamed on tie-break. In 1995, she earned the title of Woman International Master from FIDE, the World Chess Federation, and was promoted to Woman Grandmaster in 1997. In 2019 she won the Ukrainian women's championship.

== Olympian since age 17 ==
Zhukova's early results earned her a spot on the Ukrainian national women's team starting in 1996, and she has represented Ukraine in six straight Olympiads, since 1998 on board one. In 65 games, she has scored (+20−13=32), for 55.4 per cent. Her complete Olympiad results are:

- Yerevan 1996, board 4, +5−2=4
- Elista 1998, board 1, +3−4=3
- Istanbul 2000, board 1, +3−1=7
- Bled 2002, board 1, +3−3=5
- Calvià 2004, board 1, +1−3=8
- Turin 2006, board 1, +5−0=5, team and board gold medals

== International successes ==
Zhukova tied for 1st−2nd places at Belgrade 1998 with 6/9. She won the Groningen Women's Festival in 1998 with 7/10. She won the 1999 EU Cup for Women at Nova Gorica with 5½/7. She placed 2nd at the 1999 Alushta Women's Zonal with 6½/9.

She won the European Women's Championship twice, in 2000 and 2015.

== Personal life ==
Zhukova was born in Dresden, East Germany, and lives in Odesa, Ukraine. She was married to Grandmaster Alexander Grischuk.

In the July 2019 Ukrainian parliamentary election Zhukova was placed fourth of the party list of Movement of New Forces. The party failed to win seats.

In the October 2020 Ukrainian local elections Zhukova is placed fourth on the Odesa City Council election list of the party Servant of the People.
