= Lei Tingjie =

Chinese chess grandmaster (born 1997)

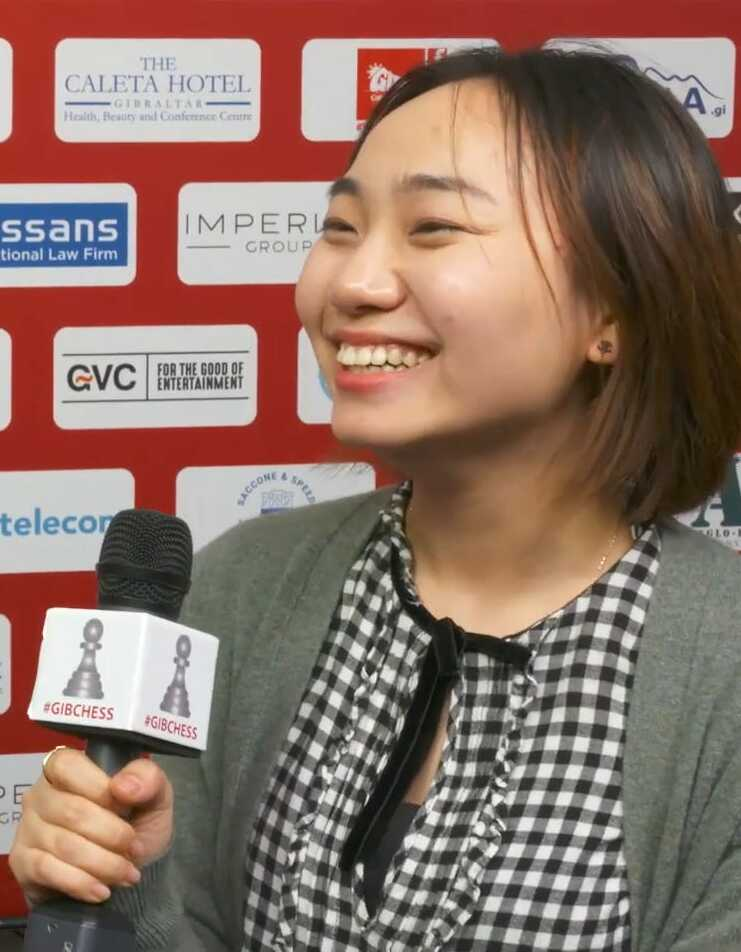
- Lei in 2020

Personal information
- Born: 3 March 1997 (age 29) Fuling, Chongqing, China
- Spouse: Raymond Song (m. 2025)

Chess career
- Country: China
- Title: Grandmaster (2017)
- FIDE rating: 2566 (July 2026)
- Peak rating: 2569 (November 2025)

Lei Tingjie
- Chinese: 雷挺婕
Transcriptions
Standard Mandarin
- Hanyu Pinyin: Léi Tǐngjié
- IPA: [lěɪ tʰìŋ tɕjě]

Lei Tingjie (Chinese: 雷挺婕; pinyin: Léi Tǐngjié, born 3 March 1997) is a Chinese chess player who holds the title of Grandmaster. She was the 2021 Women's Grand Swiss champion, the 2017 Chinese women's national champion and the 2022–23 Women's Candidates winner. Lei earned the Grandmaster title in 2017 at age 19, and was the sixth woman to obtain the title as a teenager.

== Career ==
In 2014, Lei won the 4th China Women Masters Tournament in Wuxi on tie-break from Ju Wenjun and was awarded the title of Woman Grandmaster (WGM) by FIDE. In 2015, she won the women's open event of the Moscow Open, ahead of World Junior Girls Champion Aleksandra Goryachkina. Lei competed in the Women's World Chess Championship 2015, where she was knocked out in the second round by top seed Humpy Koneru. In December 2015, Lei tied for 1st–5th with Alexander Zubarev, Olexandr Bortnyk, Jure Škoberne, and Maximilian Neef in the 32nd Böblingen International Open scoring 7/9 points.

In 2016, she played on the gold medal-winning Chinese team in the women's event of the Asian Nations Cup in Dubai. She was awarded the full Grandmaster title in March 2017. In June, Lei won the 6th Chinese Women's Masters Tournament in Wuxi, ahead of Women's World Champion Tan Zhongyi. In December, Lei took the silver medal in the Women's World Rapid Chess Championship in Riyadh.

In January 2018, Lei won the 43rd Sevilla International Chess Open, one of the largest high-level open tournaments ever won by a female player.

She won the FIDE Women's Grand Swiss Tournament 2021 and secured a spot in the Women's Candidates Tournament 2022–23.

In April 2023, she won the Women's Candidates Tournament 2022-23 after beating Tan Zhongyi 3½–1½, winning the match by game 5. In July 2023, Lei challenged reigning Women's World Champion Ju Wenjun for the title, but lost the match after a loss in game 12.

As the Runner of the World Championship Lei participated in Women's Candidates Tournament 2024 finishing tied 2nd, 3rd with tiebreaks.

Lei won the silver medal at the Women's World Blitz Chess Championship 2024, Beating Bibisara Assaubayeva in quarter finals, Kateryna Lagno in semifinals and losing to Ju Wenjun in the finals.

Lei finished 2nd in Norway Chess Women 2025, trailing 1st place Anna Muzychuk by only 0.5 points.

She participated in Women's Chess World Cup 2025 as the top seed, she lost in the semifinals to 4th seed Koneru Humpy and played 3rd seed Tan Zhongyi in the 3rd place match, which she lost with the score 1.5-0.5, Hence narrowly missing the Candidates spot.

In June 2026, she was part of the Dragon Chilling team that won double gold at World Rapid and Blitz Team Chess Championships 2026.

== Personal life ==
Lei attended the Shanghai University of Finance and Economics. She is married to Taiwanese Grandmaster Raymond Song.

== See also ==
- Chess in China
- Women in chess
