= Tan Zhongyi =

Chinese chess grandmaster (born 1991)

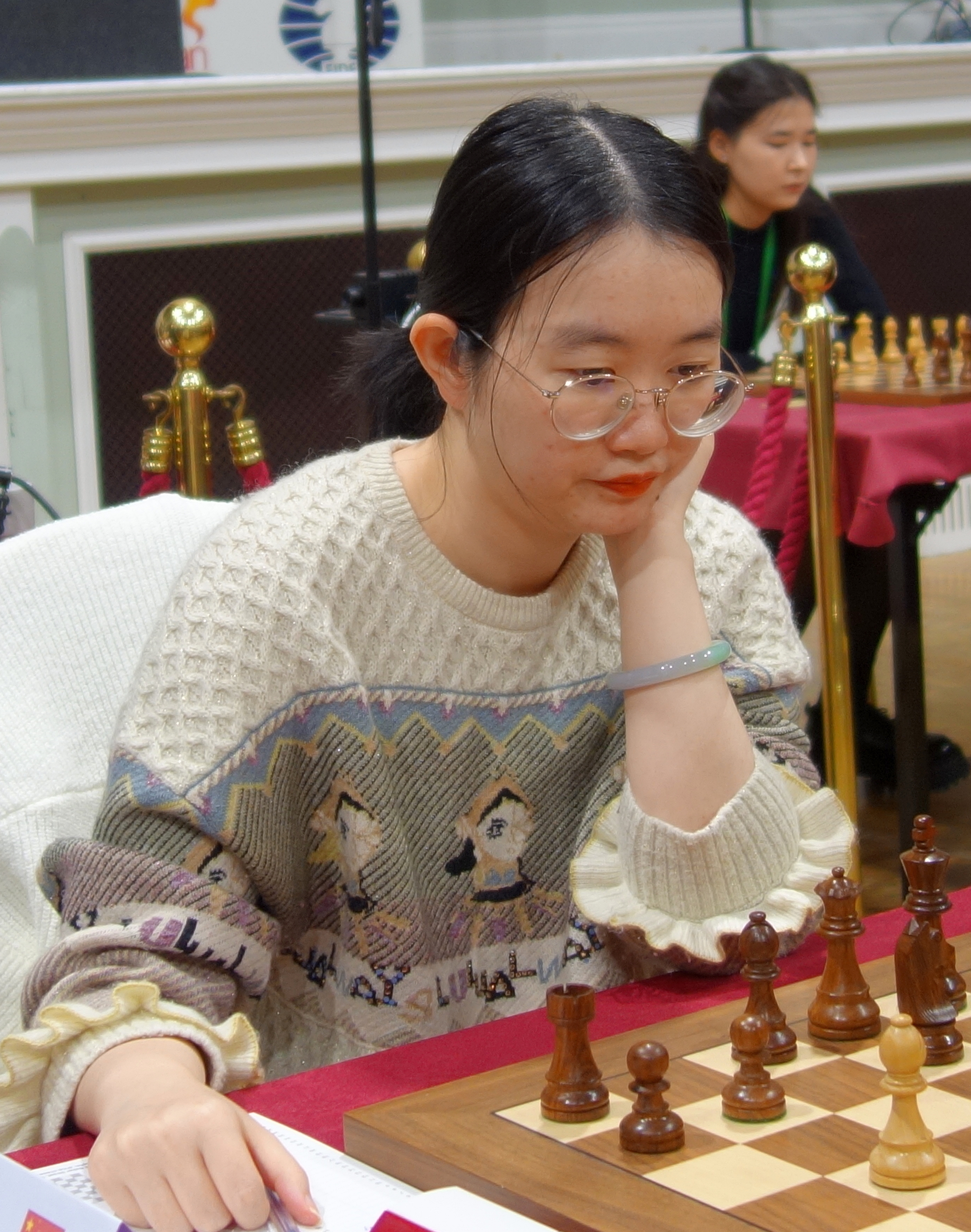
- Tan in 2023

Personal information
- Born: 29 May 1991 (age 35) Chongqing, China

Chess career
- Country: China
- Title: Grandmaster (2017)
- Women's World Champion: 2017–2018
- FIDE rating: 2520 (August 2026)
- Peak rating: 2561 (December 2024)

Tan Zhongyi (Chinese: 谭中怡;, pinyin : Tán Zhōngyí, born 29 May 1991) is a Chinese chess grandmaster (GM). She is a former Women's World Champion, winning the 2017 knockout edition of the world championship in Iran where she defeated Anna Muzychuk in the final. Tan is also a former Women's World Rapid Champion. She is the three-time reigning Chinese women's national champion, and is a five-time national champion overall with titles in 2015, 2020, 2021, and 2022.

She won the Women's Candidates Tournament 2024, earning the right to challenge Ju Wenjun in the Women's World Chess Championship 2025, She lost the match with the scoreline 2½-6½.

== Career ==
She won the World Youth U10 Girls Chess Championship twice, in 2000 and 2001, both held in Oropesa del Mar. In 2002, she won the World Youth U12 Girls Chess Championship in Heraklion.

In August–September 2008 at the Women's World Chess Championship she was knocked out in the second round by Pia Cramling by ½-1½.

In 2011, she won the women's chess tournament at the 2011 Summer Universiade in Shenzhen, contributing to China's team gold medal. Tan won the Women's World University Chess Championship of 2012 in Guimarães. In 2013, she won the 3rd China Women Masters Tournament in Wuxi with a score of 6.5/9 points, 1.5 ahead of runners-up Valentina Gunina and Huang Qian. In 2014 Tan won the Asian Women's Blitz Championship in Sharjah.

In May 2015 she won the Chinese Women's Chess Championship in Xinghua. The following month, Tan won the 5th China Women Masters Tournament with 7/9, a full point ahead of second-placed Lei Tingjie. In August 2015, she won the Asian Women's Rapid Championship in Al Ain. On December 1, 2015, Tan Zhongyi won the 1st China Chess Queen Match, a knockout tournament held in Taizhou, Zhejiang, after defeating Ju Wenjun in the final in an armageddon game.

She won the women's gold medal for board 4 at the 42nd Chess Olympiad in 2016.

She reached the final of the Women's World Chess Championship 2017 against GM Anna Muzychuk. They finished the classical games 2–2 with one win each, sending the match to a rapid tie-break. Tan won the two-game tie-break by drawing the first game with Black and then winning the second game with White, and thus became Women's World Champion. This also earned her the title of Grandmaster.

She lost the Women's World Champion title to Ju Wenjun at the Women's World Chess Championship Match 2018 with a final score of 5½–4½.

In 2020, she won the women's top prize at the Gibraltar Masters.

In 2021, Tan achieved third place in the Women's Chess World Cup after winning against Anna Muzychuk with a score of 2.5 - 1.5.

In 2022, Tan won the Women's World Rapid Championship in Almaty, Kazakhstan, after defeating local player Dinara Saduakassova in the tiebreaker.

Tan won the Women's Candidates Tournament 2024 with a score of 9/14, earning the right to challenge Ju Wenjun for Women's World Chess Championship.

Tan lost the Women's World Chess Championship 2025 against compatriot Ju Wenjun, with a score of 6.5-2.5.

Tan Finished 3rd in Women's Chess World Cup 2025 she lost in the semifinals to eventual winner Divya Deshmukh and beat Lei Tingjie in the 3rd place match, As a result she qualified for the Women's Candidates Tournament 2026.

Tan participated in Women's Candidates Tournament 2026, She finished 8th with the score 5.5/14 losing 4 and winning only 1.

In August 2026, Tan won the Cairns Cup; she scored 6.5/9 points (+5-1=3) with the only loss coming in the final round against Stavroula Tsolakidou. She was the first person to win the Cairns Cup twice, having previously won it in 2024.

== China Chess League ==
Tan Zhongyi plays for China Mobile Group Chongqing Company Ltd chess club in the China Chess League (CCL).

== Personal life ==
Tan was born in Chongqing. In 1997, she started learning to play chess. She graduated from the School of Law of Shanghai University of Finance and Economics in 2013.

== See also ==
- Chess in China
- List of female chess grandmasters
