= Women's event at the 43rd Chess Olympiad =

- Host city: Batumi
- Country: Georgia
- Nations: 146
- Teams: 151
- Athletes: 747
- Dates: 24 September – 5 October 2018
- Main venue: Sport Palace Batumi

Medalists

Team
- 1st place, gold medalist(s): China
- 2nd place, silver medalist(s): Ukraine
- 3rd place, bronze medalist(s): Georgia

Individual
- Board 1: (China) Ju Wenjun
- Board 2: (Ukraine) Mariya Muzychuk
- Board 3: (Azerbaijan) Khanim Balajayeva
- Board 4: (Italy) Marina Brunello
- Reserve: (Jordan) Boshra Alshaebyi

The women's event at the 43rd Chess Olympiad was held from 24 September – 5 October 2018. It was contested by a record number of 151 teams, representing 146 nations. Georgia, as host nation, fielded three teams, whilst the International Braille Chess Association (IBCA), the International Physically Disabled Chess Association (IPCA), and the International Chess Committee of the Deaf (ICCD) each provided one team. A total of 747 players participated in the open event.

China successfully defended the gold medal won in the Women's event in 2016 and claimed their sixth title overall. The team scored seven wins and four draws for a total of 18 match points. This exact achievement was matched only by Ukraine, who had inferior tie-breaker and won the silver medal, while host nation Georgia won the bronze medal. Women's World Chess Champion Ju Wenjun of China, playing on board one, was the best individual player in the Women's event by scoring 7 out of 9 (five wins and four draws) with a performance rating of 2661. On the other boards, the gold medals were won by Mariya Muzychuk of Ukraine on board two with 8 out of 10 and a performance rating of 2616, Khanim Balajayeva of Azerbaijan on board three who scored 7 out of 9 with a performance rating of 2522, Marina Brunello of Italy on board four with 8½ out of 10 and a performance rating of 2505, and Boshra Alshaebyi of Jordan as a reserve player with 8 out of 8 and a performance rating of 2568.

== Competition format and calendar ==
The tournament was played in a Swiss system format. The time control for all games was 90 minutes for the first 40 moves, after which an additional 30 minutes were granted and increment of 30 seconds per move was applied. Players were permitted to offer a draw at any time. A total of 11 rounds were played, with all teams playing in every round.

In each round, four players from each team faced four players from another team; teams were permitted one reserve player who could be substituted between rounds. The four games were played simultaneously on four boards, scoring 1 game point for a win and ½ game point for a draw. The scores from each game were summed together to determine which team won the round. Winning a round was worth 2 match points, regardless of the game point margin, while drawing a round was worth 1 match point. Teams were ranked in a table based on match points. Tie-breakers for the table were i) the Sonneborn-Berger system; ii) total game points scored; iii) the sum of the match points of the opponents, excluding the lowest one.

Tournament rounds started on 24 September and ended with the final round on 5 October. All rounds started at 15:00 GET (UTC+4), except for the final round which started at 11:00 GET (UTC+4). There was one rest day at the tournament, on 29 September after the fifth round.

All dates are GET (UTC+4)

1	Round	RD	Rest day

September/October	24th Mon	25th Tue	26th Wed	27th Thu	28th Fri	29th Sat	30th Sun	1st Mon	2nd Tue	3rd Wed	4th Thu	5th Fri
Tournament round	1	2	3	4	5	RD	6	7	8	9	10	11

== Teams and players ==
The Women's event was contested a record number of 151 teams, representing 146 nations. Georgia, as host nation, have fielded three teams, whilst the International Physically Disabled Chess Association (IPCA) and the International Chess Committee of the Deaf (ICCD) each provided one team.

The women's section featured most of the top players according to the FIDE rating list published in September 2018 with the highest rated female player Hou Yifan and the former Women's World Champion Tan Zhongyi not playing for China. Former Women's World Champions Alexandra Kosteniuk, Anna Ushenina and Mariya Muzychuk are part of their national teams, while Antoaneta Stefanova was not playing because of the controversy with the Bulgarian Chess Federation. Sweden's Pia Cramling, who first played at the Chess Olympiads, was also not playing because of her role about captaincy.

The team with highest average pre-tournament rating of 2523 was Russia, who are playing with the same line-up from the Baku Chess Olympiad, including former Women's World Champion Alexandra Kosteniuk, Alexandra Goryachkina, Valentina Gunina, Natalia Pogonina and Olga Girya. Second strongest team are Ukraine with Anna and Mariya Muzychuk playing on the top two boards, Anna Ushenina, Natalia Zhukova and Iulija Osmak. The defending champions China without Hou Yifan and Tan Zhongyi are the third seeds. The first of the three Georgian teams are also among the favourites with the fourth highest pre-tournament rating. They are playing with Nana Dzagnidze on the top board, Lela Javakhishvili, Nino Batsiashvili, Bela Khotenashvili and Meri Arabidze.

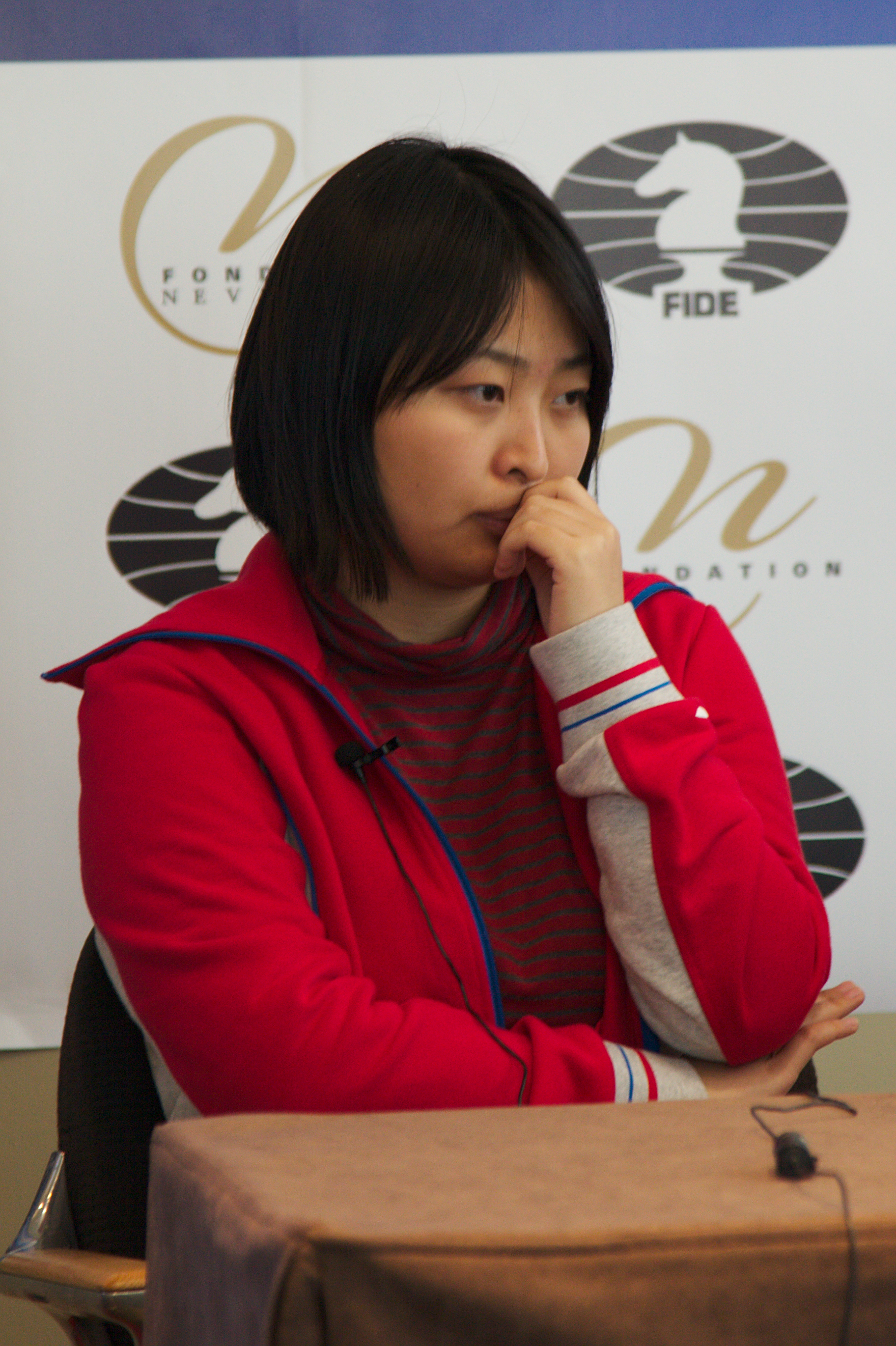
Current Women's World Chess Champion and world no. 2 Ju Wenjun was playing on board one for China

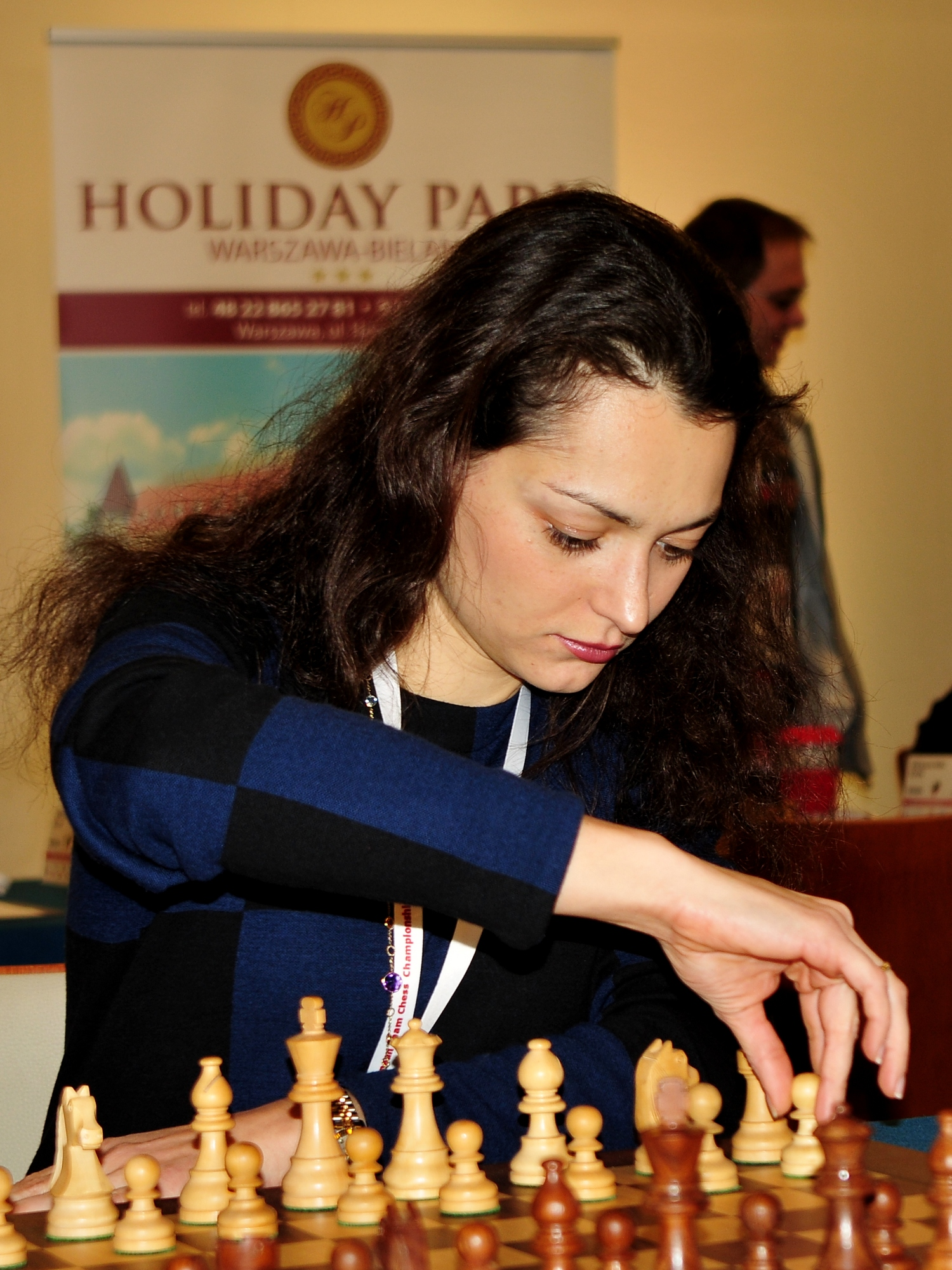
Former Women's World Chess Champion and world no. 3 Alexandra Kosteniuk was playing on board one for Russia

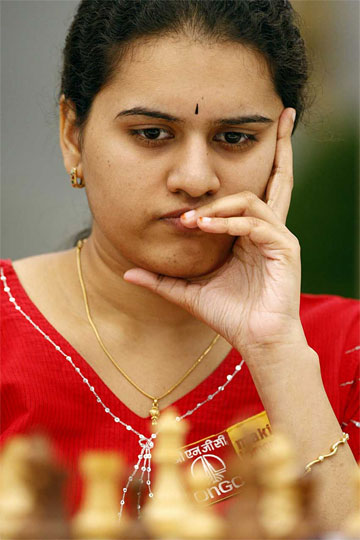
Humpy Koneru was playing on board one for India

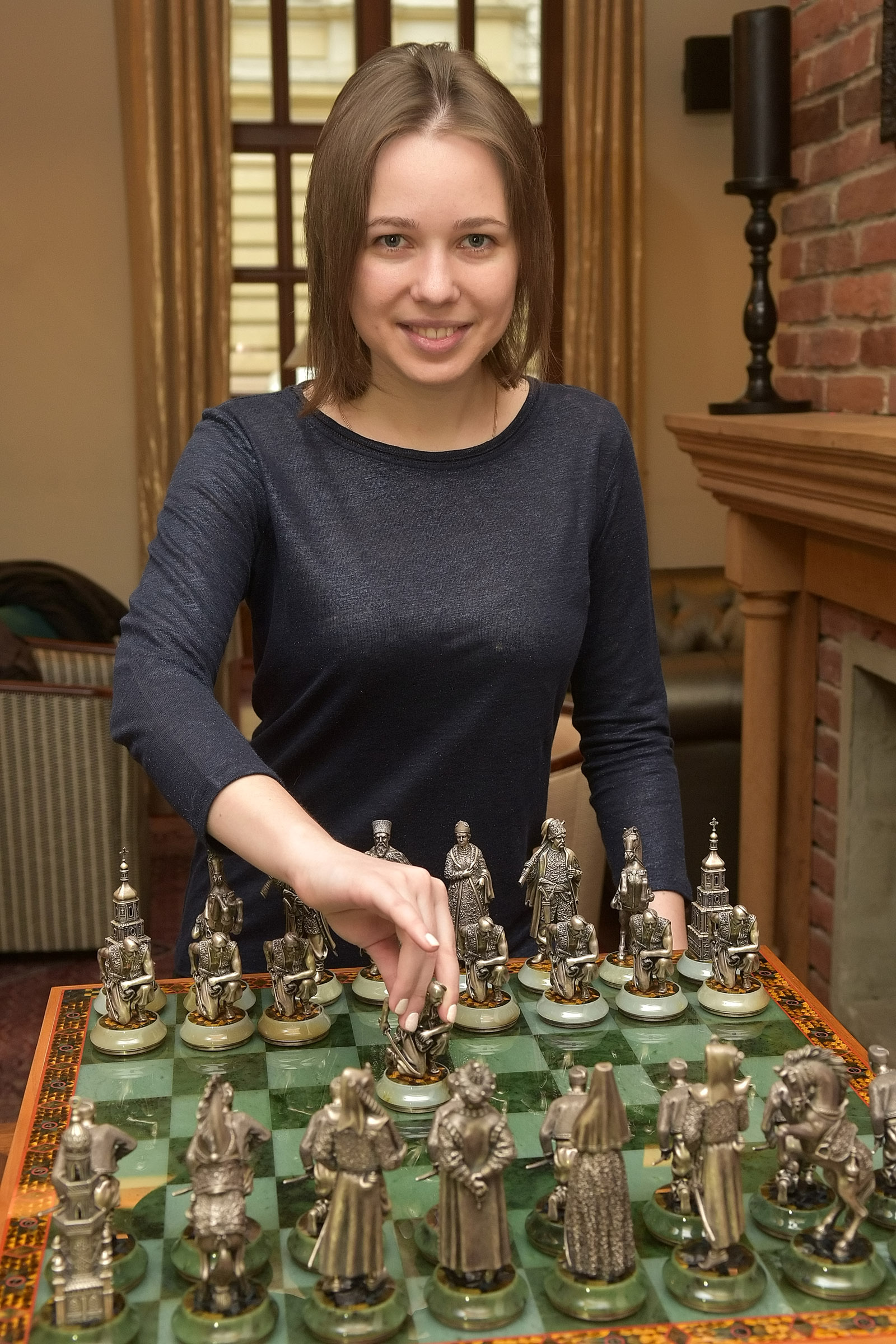
Former Women's World Chess Champion Mariya Muzychuk was playing on board two for Ukraine

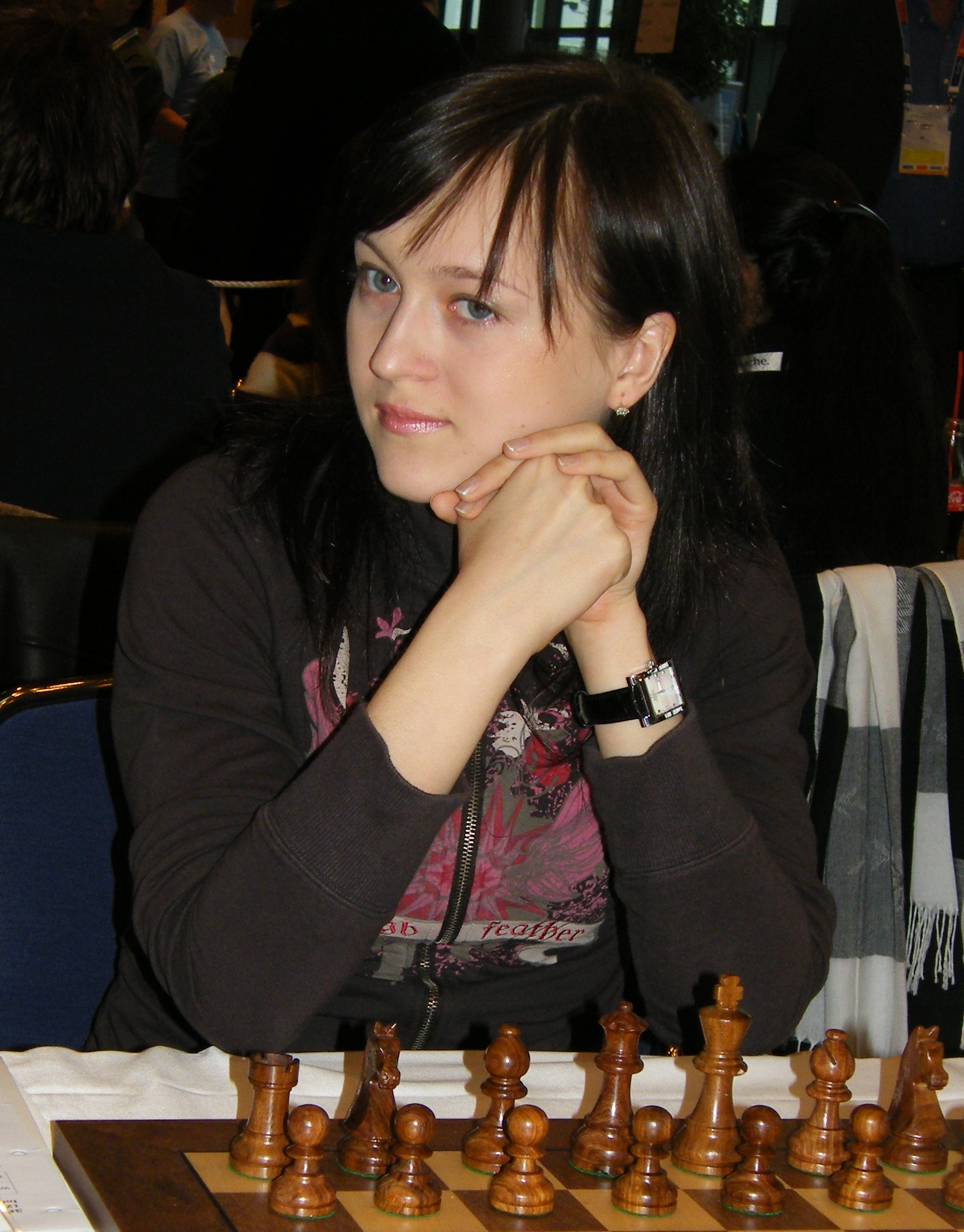
Former Women's World Chess Champion Anna Ushenina was playing on board three for Ukraine

== Rounds ==
=== Round 1 ===
As is common in the first round of an olympiad, several of the poorer federations were unable to field teams. Omitted from the pairings were Nigeria, Pakistan, Ivory Coast, Rwanda and Burundi. The favourites did not have serious problems but not all of them were able to score maximal victories. Ukraine and India did so in sweeping Monaco and New Zealand, respectively, while Russia and China conceded half point each to Costa Rica and Tajikistan, respectively. Russia's Alexandra Goryachkina on the top board for had even a lost position in one moment against 1943-rated WIM Maria Rodriguez but managed to save the game.

=== Round 2 ===
The second round was marked by Uzbekistan's 2½-1½ victory over gold-medal favourites Russia thanks to the win by Nodira Nadirjanova against Natalija Pogonina on the lowest board. Ukraine were also challenged in their match on the first table by Turkmenistan, where Natalia Zhukova scored a nice win in the only decisive game and helped her the Ukrainian team overcome with a minimal win. Germany were unexpectedly held to a draw by Georgia's third team, while Kazakhstan could also not win their match against Peru. On the other hand, India and Azerbaijan did not have problems and eased Venezuela and Belgium, respectively.

=== Round 3 ===
There were no big upsets in the third round. Russia bounced back from the shocking loss to Uzbekistan in the previous round with a convincing 4-0 win over Malaysia. China dropped only a half point in their storming past Cuba, while Azerbaijan and Ukraine conceded a full point against England and Romania, respectively. The match played on the top table between Serbia and India ended 2-2. Humpy Koneru and Harika Dronavalli won their games on the first two boards for India but Serbia's Adela Velikić and Teodora Injac scored on the lower boards. Poland could also not win their match against Turkey and played 2-2.

=== Round 4 ===
Mammadzada vs Zatonskih

Position: f7 white rook, f4 black knight, e3 black king, g3 white king, g1 black rook

In this position, Mammadzada made a blunder by playing 106. Kh4? (106. Kh2 would have saved the game) and resigned immediately after 106... Kf3.

The most interesting match of the fourth round was the clash between Azerbaijan and the United States in which American Anna Zatonskih squeezed out win in a theoretically drawn rook and a knight vs rook endgame against Gunay Mammadzada on the top board (see diagram). China did not allow another surprise by Uzbekistan and won 3-1, while India go back with a 3-1 victory against Poland thanks to the wins by Harika Dronavalli and Tania Sachdev. Ukraine easily routed Slovenia 4-0, Mongolia were convincing against Iran 3½-½, and Armenia edged out Italy 2½-1½. On the other boards, the second Georgian team snatched a narrow victory over Hungary, as well as Turkey in their match against Serbia. Only six teams remained with perfect scores after four rounds: United States, China, Ukraine, Mongolia, Armenia and Georgia.

=== Round 5 ===
There were several interesting matches played in the fifth round. The main encounter occurred on the third table between Georgia and Ukraine with draws on the higher and one win each on the lower boards. Nino Batsiashvili ended her winning streak and drew against former Women's World Chess Champion Anna Ushenina, while Bela Khotenashvili scored full point for Georgia. Armenia managed to hold against China thanks to Lilit Mkrtchian's win on the second board but Lei Tingjie scored for the opposing team. India did not habe problems in their comfortable 3½-½ victory over Argentina with wins by Koneru Humpy, Tania Sachdev and Eesha Karavade, while the second Georgian team defeated Turkey with the same result after Salome Melia, Sopio Gvetadze and Sopiko Khukhashvili scored full point each. In the other matches on the higher tables, Azerbaijan and Canada won their clashes against Greece and Tajikistan 3-1, respectively. Czech Republic minimally beat Australia thanks to a win on the top board by Karolína Olšarová. The top-seeded Russian team did not have difficulties in outplaying Germany 3½-½, while the United States scored the same result in their match against Mongolia, thus ascending to the top as the only team with perfect score after six rounds. Only six teams remained with perfect scores after four rounds: United States, China, Ukraine, Mongolia, Armenia and Georgia.

=== Round 6 ===
The top pairing of the sixth round occurred on the second table, where Ukraine and China exchanged one win each in a 2-2 tie. Both victories were scored by Black on the second and third board, where former Women's World Chess Champion Mariya Muzychuk defeated Shen Yang and Huang Qian won against Anna Ushenina. United States ended their winning streak of five matches in a row and conceded the first match point after drawing against India in a match with four decisive games with victories by those playing as White. Koneru Humpy and Tania Sachdev scored for India, while Irina Krush and Jennifer Yu for the American team. Russia suffered their second loss in the tournament after suffering a 3-1 knockdown by Armenia. Lilit Mkrtchian and Siranush Ghukasyan exploited their play as White on the second and fourth board, respectively. Azerbaijan scored a minimal victory against Latvia thanks to Ulviyya Fataliyeva's win on the last board. On the other top tables, Georgia's first narrowly beat Georgia's second team 2½-1½, Italy beat Cuba 3-1, while Lithuania tied their match against Kazakhstan. United States, Georgia and Armenia with 11/12 match points each were on the top after six rounds.

=== Round 7 ===
The central match of the seventh round was the clash between Armenia and United States on the first table, where Armenians snatched a minimal victory thanks to the Elina Danielian and Anna Sargsyan who scored full point as White in the games against Anna Zatonskih and Sabina-Francesca Foisor, respectively; Jennifer Yu beat Maria Kursova on the lowest board, which was only enough to close the margin, as Irina Krush and Lilit Mkrtchian drew on the second board. China beat Netherlands 3-1 with wins scored by Ju Wenjun and Lei Tingjie both as White, while Ukraine were challenged by Iran and scored a narrow 2½-1½ victory after Mariya Muzychuk scored against Mitra Hejazipour on the second board. Italy and Azerbaijan as well as India and Georgia's first team tied their matches with draws on all boards. Romania edged out Uzbekistan 2½-1½ with points that came up from the games involving Corina-Isabela Peptan and Elena-Luminița Cosma, while Gulrukhbegim Tokhirjonova scored a futile win for the opposing team. Kazakhstan and Hungary stormed past Argentina and Serbia, respectively, with 3½-½ wins. Armenia were the sole leader after this round ahead of China, Ukraina, Georgia and Romania with one match point behind.

=== Round 8 ===
Ushenina vs Sargsyan

Position: a8 black rook, b8 black knight, d8 black queen, e8 black king, f8 black bishop, h8 black rook, a7 black pawn, e7 black pawn, f7 black pawn, g7 black pawn, h7 black pawn, c6 black pawn, e6 white pawn, b5 black pawn, d5 black knight, h5 black bishop, c4 black pawn, d4 white pawn, c3 white knight, f3 white knight, h3 white pawn, a2 white pawn, b2 white pawn, e2 white bishop, f2 white pawn, g2 white pawn, a1 white rook, c1 white bishop, d1 white queen, e1 white king, h1 white rook

This position has arrived at after 1. d4 d5 2. c4 c6 3. Nf3 Nf6 4. Nc3 dxc4 5. e4 b5 6. Be2 Bg4 7. h3 Bh5 8. e5 Nd5 9. e6. Here Sargsyan played 9... fxe6?, which allowed Ushenina to launch a strong attack and leave her in a desperate position. Black resigned after White's 20th move.

Ukraine and the sole leader Armenia played on the top table of Round 8. Anna Muzychuk with her nice win over Elina Danielian on board one and Anna Ushenina's overwhelming win against Anna Sargsyan (see diagram) secured a 3-1 victory for the Ukrainian team. United States, Hungary and Kazakhstan both won their matches against Italy, Hungary and Georgia, respectively, by the same result. Hoang Thanh Trang and Ticia Gara both as Wite won against their Indian counterparts. China scored a commanding 3½-½ victory against Romania with only Corina-Isabela Peptan being able to draw, while Iran were also superb in defeating Peru with the same result. Russia bounced back by whitewashing Netherlands to enter top ten. Mongolia upset Poland 3-1 in a match with wins on all boards. Batkhuyag Munguntuul, Davaademberel Nomin-Erdene and Tuvshintugs Batchimeg scored for the winning team, while Karina Szczepkowska brought her team the only point in the match. China and Ukraine topped the table after the round with 14/16 each.

=== Round 9 ===
The ninth round saw China beating Kazakhstan 3-1 for their third consecutive match victory thanks to Huang Qian and Lei Tingjie who scored on the lower boards. Ukraine were unable to beat Azerbaijan on the second table and tied. Anna Muzychuk beat Gunay Mammadzada on the top board but the Azeri team salvaged a draw after Gulnar Mammadova defeated Anna Ushenina. United States snatched a minimal win over Hungary in a dramatic match with only one win by Tatev Abrahamyan who scored her second win in a row. Armenia defeated Iran 3-1 with wins in the games played as White and draws in those played as Black. Russia produced a victory with the same result against Romania, where full point was scored in the games involving Alexandra Kosteniuk and Olga Girya. Georgia also defeated Mongolia 3-1 with two wins by Nana Dzagnidze and Bela Khotenashvili. On the other boards Georgia's second team tied with Serbia, while no winner occurred in the matches contested between Italy and India, as well as between Uzbekistan and France. After Ukraine failed to win their match against Azerbaijan, China were the only team on the top of the table after the round.

=== Round 10 ===
All matches of the tenth round played on the first seven tables were tied, while all games in the matches on the top three tables were drawn. These include China against the United States, Russia against Ukraine, and Azerbaijan against Armenia. Vietnam and Hungary as well as Spain and Kazakhstan exchanged one win each. Georgia and the Czech Republic tied with four decisive games and full point scored by those playing as White, where Nana Dzagnidze and Bela Khotenashvili won for the host nation, and Joanna Worek and Kristyna Novosadova for the Czech team.

=== Round 11 ===
The final round saw the encounter between the top-seeded Russia and the reigning champions China. Russia took the lead thanks to Alexandra Goryachkina who beat Shen Yang as Black on the second board but her team was held to a draw after Ju Wenjun beat Alewxandra Kosteniuk as Black on board one. Ukraine defeated the United States 3-1 and equalised China in the number of match points on the top. China had, however, a superior tie-break and therefore won the gold ahead of Ukraine. The bronze medal went to the host nation Georgia, whose team scored a commanding 3-1 win over Armenia with wins by Nana Dzagnidze and Lela Javakhishvili.

== Final standings ==
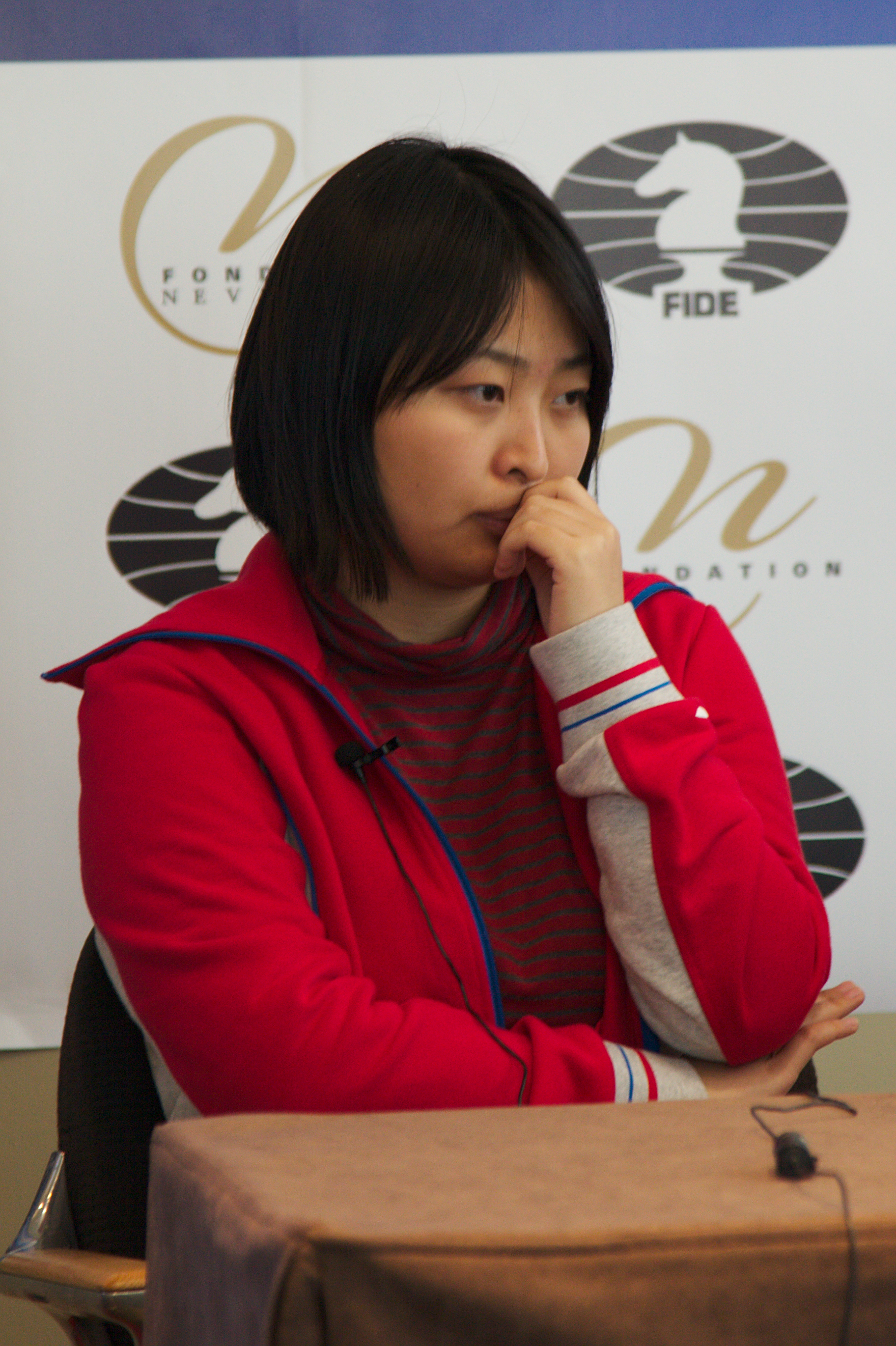
Women's World Chess Champion Ju Wenjun of China was the best individual player in the Women's event.

China successfully defended the gold medal won in the Women's event 2016 and claimed their sixth title overall. The team scored seven wins and four draws for a total of 18 match points. This exact achievement was matched only by Ukraine, who had inferior tie-breaker and won the silver medal. These two teams were also the only unbeaten in the Women's event. Host nation Georgia finished solely on the third place and won the bronze medal with seven wins, three draws and one loss for a total of 17 match points. Russia, who were top seeds before the tournament, finished immediately after the podium on the fourth place after suffering losses to Uzbekistan in the second and Armenia in the sixth round, and being only on the 24th place after seven rounds. They scored 16 match points and had the highest tie-breaker among the nine teams with the same number of points. Armenia, who were the sole leader after seven rounds, occupied the seventh place at the end. Georgia's second team did also earn spot in the top ten, finishing on the ninth place overall. Teams that disappointed include Poland who finished in 16th place and Germany who finished in 28th place.

Women's World Chess Champion Ju Wenjun of China, playing on board one, was the best individual player in the Women's event by scoring 7 out of 9 (five wins and four draws) with a performance rating of 2661. On the other boards, the gold medals were won by Mariya Muzychuk of Ukraine on board two with 8 out of 10 and a performance rating of 2616, Khanim Balajayeva of Azerbaijan on board three who scored 7 out of 9 with a performance rating of 2522, Marina Brunello of Italy on board four with 8½ out of 10 and a performance rating of 2505, and Boshra Alshaebyi of Jordan as a reserve player with 8 out of 8 and a performance rating of 2568.

- Board 1: (China) Ju Wenjun 2661
- Board 2: (Ukraine) Mariya Muzychuk 2616
- Board 3: (Azerbaijan) Khanim Balajayeva 2522
- Board 4: (Italy) Marina Brunello 2505
- Reserve: (Jordan) Boshra Alshaebyi 2568

Women's event
#	Country	Players	Average rating	MP	dSB
1	China	Ju, Shen, Huang, Lei, Zhai	2485	18	407.0
2	Ukraine	A. Muzychuk, M. Muzychuk, Ushenina, Zhukova, Osmak	2486	18	395.5
3	Georgia	Dzagnidze, Javakhishvili, Batsiashvili, Khotenashvili, Arabidze	2484	17	375.0
4	Russia	Kosteniuk, Goryachkina, Gunina, Pogonina, Girya	2523	16	379.5
5	Hungary	Hoang, A. Gara, T. Gara, Lakos, Terbe	2344	16	372.0
6	Armenia	Danielian, Mkrtchian, Sargsyan, Kursova, Ghukasyan	2353	16	366.0
7	United States	Zatonskih, Krush, Abrahamyan, Foisor, Yu	2382	16	359.5
8	India	Koneru, Dronavalli, Sachdev, Karavade, Rout	2458	16	352.5
9	Georgia-2	Melia, Charkhalashvili, Gvetadze, Khukhashvili, Mikadze	2334	16	351.5
10	Azerbaijan	Mammadzada, Mamedyarova, Balajayeva, Mammadova, Fataliyeva	2369	16	347.5

Notes

- Average ratings calculated by chess-results.com based in September 2016 ratings.

All board prizes were given out according to performance ratings for players who have played at least eight games at the tournament. Ju Wenjun on the first board had the best performance of all players in the tournament. The winners of the gold medal on each board are listed in turn:

- Board 1: (China) Ju Wenjun 2661
- Board 2: (Ukraine) Mariya Muzychuk 2616
- Board 3: (Azerbaijan) Khanim Balajayeva 2522
- Board 4: (Italy) Marina Brunello 2505
- Reserve: (Jordan) Boshra Alshaebyi 2568

== See also ==
- Open event at the 43rd Chess Olympiad
