= Open event at the 43rd Chess Olympiad =

2018 chess tournament

- Host city: Batumi
- Country: Georgia
- Nations: 180
- Teams: 185
- Athletes: 920
- Dates: 24 September – 5 October 2018
- Main venue: Sport Palace Batumi

Medalists

Team
- 1st place, gold medalist(s): China
- 2nd place, silver medalist(s): United States
- 3rd place, bronze medalist(s): Russia

Individual
- Board 1: (China) Ding Liren
- Board 2: (Vietnam) Nguyễn Ngọc Trường Sơn
- Board 3: (Peru) Jorge Cori
- Board 4: (Germany) Daniel Fridman
- Reserve: (Ukraine) Anton Korobov

The open event at the 43rd Chess Olympiad was held from 24 September to 5 October 2018. It was contested by a record number of 185 teams, representing 180 nations. Georgia, as host nation, fielded three teams, whilst the International Braille Chess Association (IBCA), the International Physically Disabled Chess Association (IPCA), and the International Chess Committee of the Deaf (ICCD) each provided one team. A total of 920 players participated in the open event.

China won the gold medal in the open event for the second time after they previously claimed the title in 2014. They scored eight wins, two draws and one loss for a total of 18 match points. The same result was achieved by the United States and Russia, who had inferior tie-breakers and came up on the podium by winning the silver and bronze medal, respectively. Jorge Cori of Peru, playing on board three, was the best individual player in the open event by scoring 7½ out of 8 points (seven wins and one draw) with a performance rating of 2925. The other gold medalists include Ding Liren of China on board one who scored 5½ out of 8 points with a performance rating of 2873, Nguyễn Ngọc Trường Sơn of Vietnam on board two who scored 8½ out of 10 points with a performance rating of 2804, Daniel Fridman of Germany who scored 7½ out of 9 points with a performance rating of 2814, and Anton Korobov of Ukraine as reserve player who scored 6½ out of 8 points with a performance rating of 2773.

== Competition format and calendar ==
The tournament was played in a Swiss system format. The time control for all games was 90 minutes for the first 40 moves, after which an additional 30 minutes were granted and increment of 30 seconds per move was applied. Players were permitted to offer a draw at any time. A total of 11 rounds were played, with all teams playing in every round.

In each round, four players from each team faced four players from another team; teams were permitted one reserve player who could be substituted between rounds. The four games were played simultaneously on four boards, scoring 1 game point for a win and ½ game point for a draw. The scores from each game were summed together to determine which team won the round. Winning a round was worth 2 match points, regardless of the game point margin, while drawing a round was worth 1 match point. Teams were ranked in a table based on match points. Tie-breakers for the table were i) the Sonneborn-Berger system; ii) total game points scored; iii) the sum of the match points of the opponents, excluding the lowest one.

Tournament rounds started on 24 September and end edwith the final round on 5 October. All rounds started at 15:00 GET (UTC+4), except for the final round which started at 11:00 GET (UTC+4). There was one rest day at the tournament, on 29 September after the fifth round.

All dates are GET (UTC+4)

1	Round	RD	Rest day

September/October	24th Mon	25th Tue	26th Wed	27th Thu	28th Fri	29th Sat	30th Sun	1st Mon	2nd Tue	3rd Wed	4th Thu	5th Fri
Tournament round	1	2	3	4	5	RD	6	7	8	9	10	11

== Teams and players ==
The open section of the tournament was contested by a record number of 185 teams, representing 180 nations. Georgia, as host nation, have fielded three teams, whilst the International Braille Chess Association (IBCA), the International Physically Disabled Chess Association (IPCA), and the International Chess Committee of the Deaf (ICCD) have each provided one team.

The tournament featured nine out of the top ten players from the FIDE rating list published in September 2018 with only then-World Champion Magnus Carlsen being absent. Former World Champion Viswanathan Anand returned to the Chess Olympiads on board one for India following a break of twelve years. Other players who are playing in the open section include the former World Chess Champion Vladimir Kramnik, the upcoming challenger in the World Chess Championship 2018 Fabiano Caruana, as well as the former challengers Sergey Karjakin and Boris Gelfand. Grandmaster Eugenio Torre, who was in the line-up of the Philippines for a record twenty-three times in the 1970-2016 period and was the highest-scoring player at the 42nd Chess Olympiad, decided not to play and was named coach of the Philippines national team in the open section. Former FIDE World Champion Veselin Topalov was not playing because a dispute between chess officials caused de-recognition of the Bulgarian Chess Federation by FIDE.

This was the first time Russia had not been the top-ranked team before the start of a Chess Olympiad since their first entry in 1992 following the dissolution of the Soviet Union, conceding the top spot to the United States who are defending the title won at the previous Olympiad. United States are playing with the same line-up that won the gold medal with Fabiano Caruana, Hikaru Nakamura, Wesley So, Samuel Shankland and Ray Robson, whose average rating of 2777 was also the highest in the history of Chess Olympiads. Russia as the second strongest team have made changes in the line-up compared to the Baku Chess Olympiad, where Dmitry Jakovenko and Nikita Vitiugov have replaced Alexander Grischuk and Evgeny Tomashevsky along Vladimir Kramnik, Sergey Karjakin and Ian Nepomniachtchi. China have the third highest pre-tournament rating of 2752 and four players from Baku on the team, including Ding Liren, Li Chao, Wei Yi and Yu Yangyi, while Wang Yue was replaced by Bu Xiangzhi. Other teams among the top seeds with average ratings above 2700 are Azerbaijan led by FIDE Grand Prix 2017 winner Shakhriyar Mamedyarov, India strengthened with Vishwanathan Anand, and Ukraine with Vassily Ivanchuk and former FIDE World Chess Champion Ruslan Ponomariov on the team.

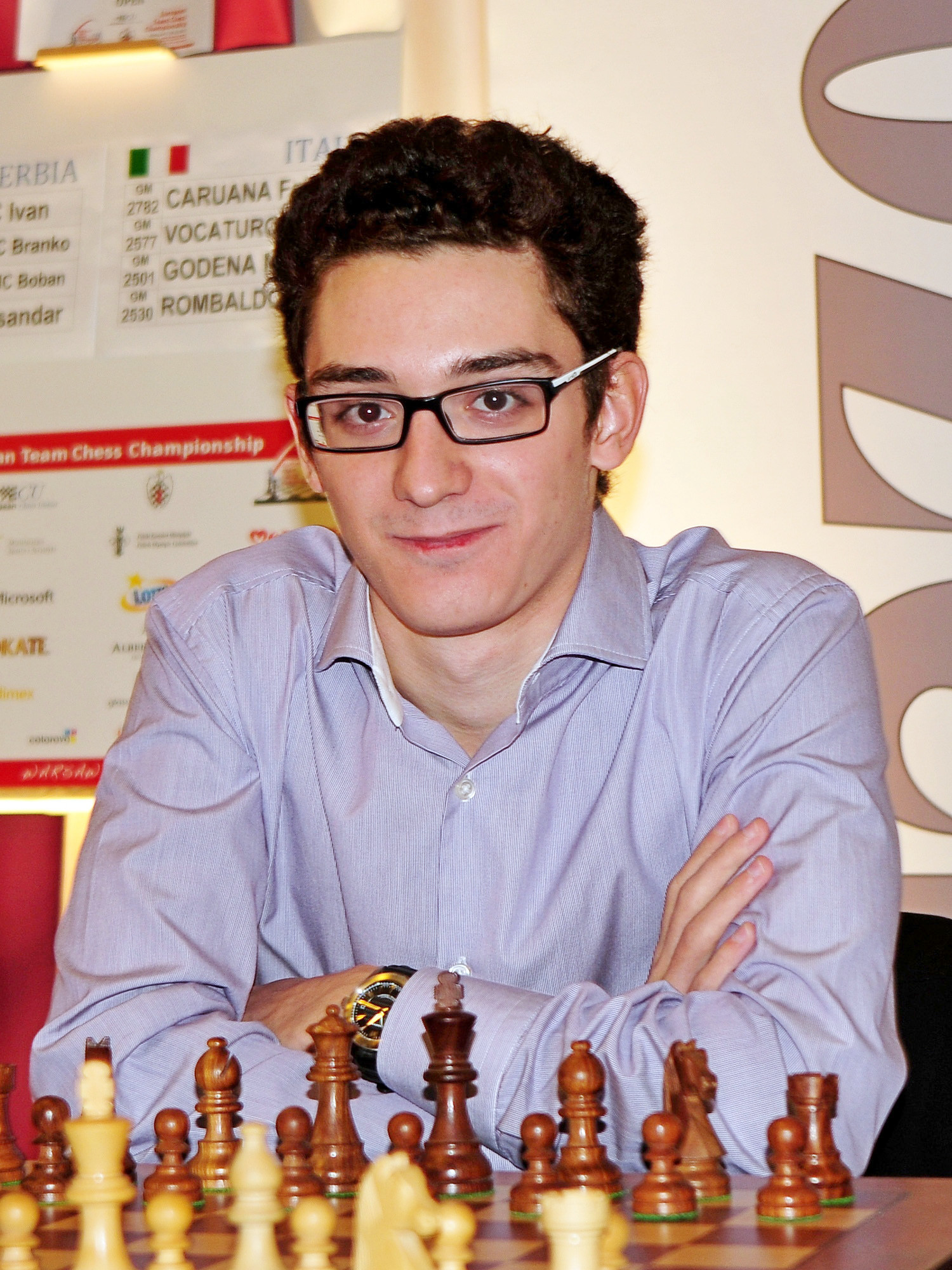
Upcoming World Champion challenger and world no. 2 Fabiano Caruana was playing on board one for the United States

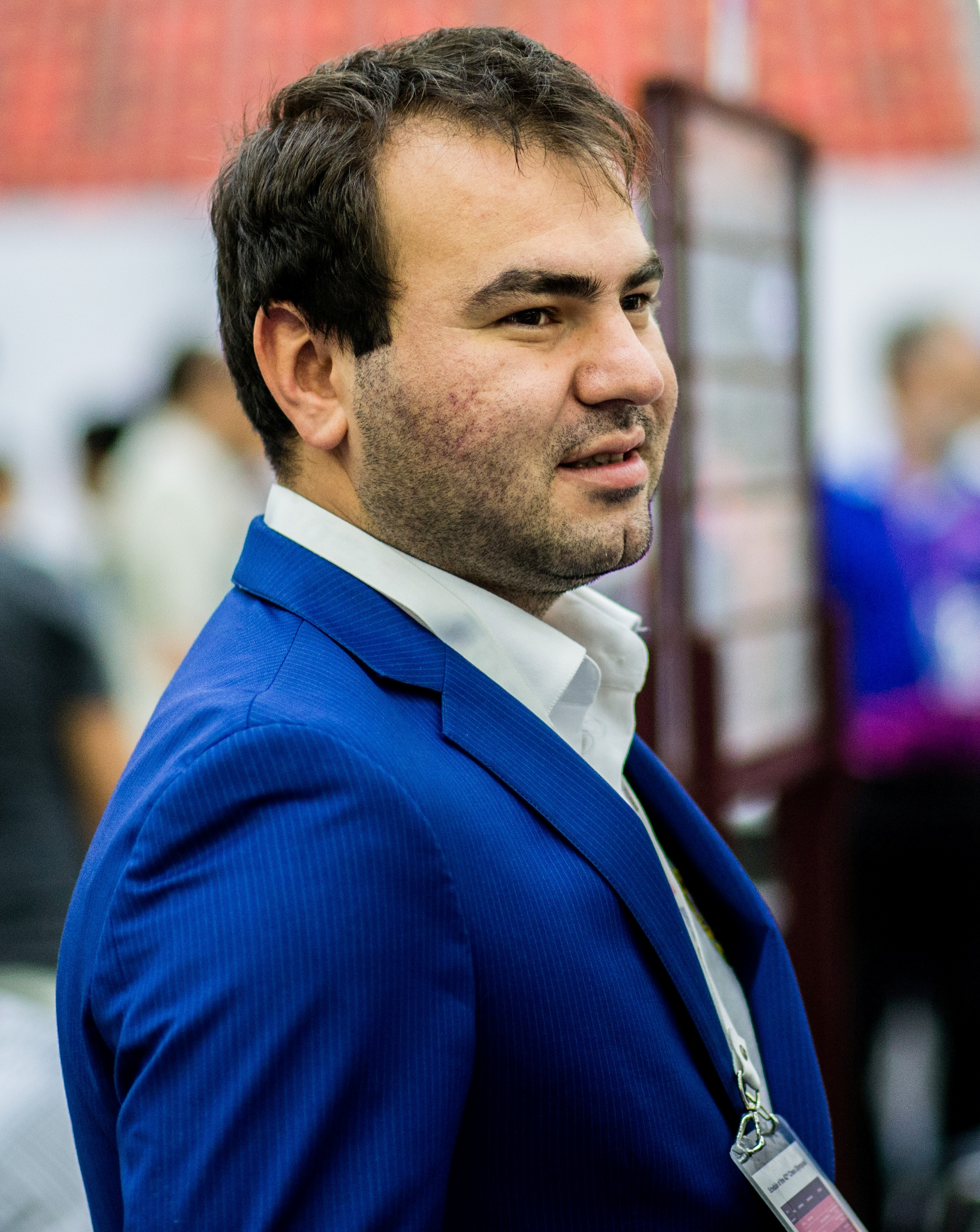
World no. 3 Shakhriyar Mamedyarov was playing on board one for Azerbaijan

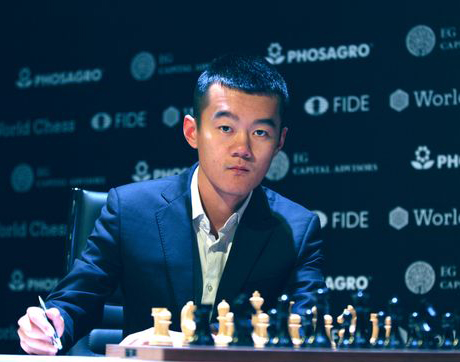
World no. 4 Ding Liren was playing on board one for China

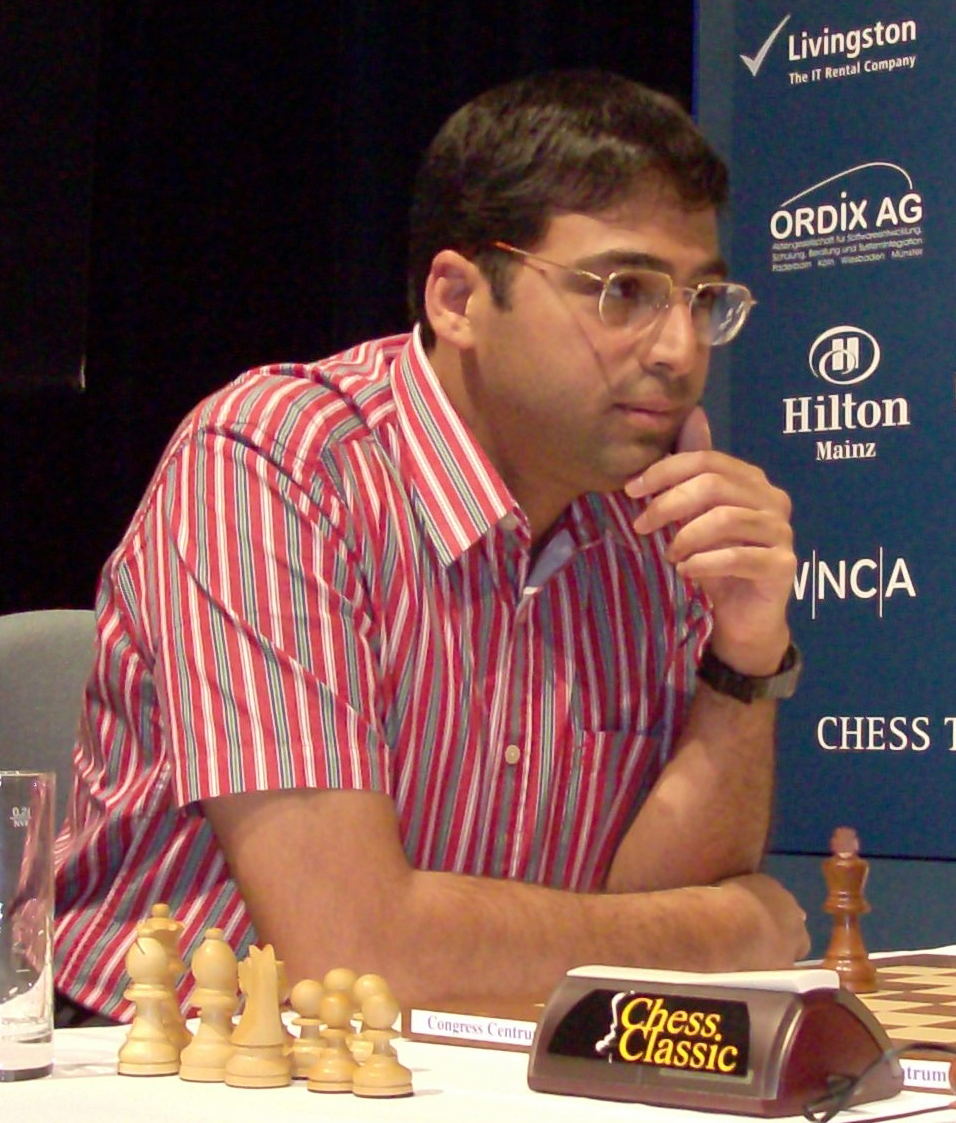
Former World Champion and world no. 10 Vishwanathan Anand was playing on board one for India

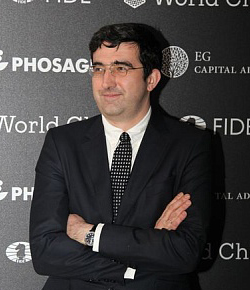
Former World Champion Vladimir Kramnik was playing on board three for Russia

== Rounds ==
=== Round 1 ===
Frick vs Maghalashvili

Position: a8 black rook, f8 black rook, g8 black king, b7 black pawn, g7 black pawn, h7 black pawn, d6 black pawn, h6 black queen, a5 black pawn, d5 white pawn, e5 black pawn, f5 black pawn, h5 black knight, b4 black knight, c4 white pawn, f4 black bishop, a3 white pawn, c3 white knight, f3 white pawn, b2 white pawn, e2 white bishop, f2 white bishop, g2 white pawn, h2 white pawn, b1 white rook, d1 white queen, f1 white rook, h1 white king

After 21...Bxh2!! White resigned, as 22.Kxh2 Ng3+ 23.Kxg3 f4+ 24.Kg4 Rf5!! 25.Bh4 Rh5 26.Qe1 Nc2 27.Qf2 Ne3+ wins.

As is common in the first round of an Olympiad, several of the poorer federations were unable to field teams. Omitted from the pairings were Nigeria, Pakistan, Ivory Coast, Rwanda, Somalia, Burundi and Congo. Maldives and Togo were unable to field the required three players and forfeited their matches. Reflecting the disparity in strength between the teams, there were no upsets on the team level; all the higher ranked teams won. The majority of matches ended in 4–0 score lines, although several teams conceded draws. The biggest upset of the round was the defeat of Chinese grandmaster Li Chao, who misplayed a drawn endgame against Morocco's Mohamed-Mehdi Aithmidou. Another grandmaster to suffer a defeat was the Canadian Aman Hambleton, who lost to the Nepalese player Rijendra Rajbhandari. The best game prize, awarded each round by a committee headed by Susan Polgar, was awarded to Davit Maghalashvili of the Georgia 2 team for a spectacular combination against Renato Frick of Liechtenstein, who resigned rather than allow the combination to be played out.

=== Round 2 ===
Fier vs Aloma Vidal

Position: c8 black rook, e8 black rook, f8 black bishop, g8 black king, b7 black queen, d7 black knight, f7 black pawn, g7 black pawn, c6 black bishop, e6 black pawn, b5 black pawn, g5 white knight, c4 black pawn, e4 white pawn, b3 black pawn, d3 white pawn, g3 white pawn, h3 white bishop, a2 white pawn, b2 white bishop, f2 white pawn, g2 white king, a1 white queen, c1 white rook, h1 white rook

After 26.Bxe6! Rxe6 27.Rh8+! Black resigned in view of 27...Kxh8 28.Rh1+ Kg8 29.Rh8+ Kxh8 30.Qh1+ Kg8 31.Qh7#

Amid reports that the Pakistan team had been prevented from leaving their country due to internal politics, all the teams except Pakistan were paired for the second round. On the top board, the top-seeded team from the United States struggled against Georgia's number three team, who were rated on average over 300 Elo lower – only Wesley So was able to score the full point. The second-seeded Russian team also conceded two draws against Ireland, Russian-born grandmaster Alexander Baburin holding Sergey Karjakin on the top board while IM David Fitzsimmons held Dmitry Jakovenko on board 4. An upset occurred in Hungary vs Albania when Peter Leko, after refuting Erald Dervishi's unsound tactics, blundered in a won position; the match ended in a 2–2 draw. Another notable player to lose was David Navara, who went down to Tajikistan's Farrukh Amonatov, however Czech Republic still won the match by a 3–1 margin. In his first Olympiad game in 12 years, Viswanathan Anand defeated Austrian grandmaster Markus Ragger, helping the Indian team to a 3½–½ win. At the conclusion of the round 41 teams had won both their matches, including seven teams with perfect 8/8 game results. Brazilian grandmaster Alexandr Fier was awarded the daily best game prize for a mating combination against Robert Aloma Vidal of Andorra involving a double rook sacrifice pattern described by chessvibes reporter Peter Doggers as "common in kids books but exceedingly rare in actual chess!"

=== Round 3 ===
The highest rated clash was between the top-seeded United States and 13th-seeded Netherlands. The game between the super-GMs Anish Giri and Fabiano Caruana was uneventful and the match was looking to be heading for a draw until two of the Dutch players erred in the endgame, handing the US a 3–1 win. China defeated Peru 3–1, Ding Liren making his comeback following a bicycle accident in Norway, however Wei Yi lost to Jorge Cori. Russia edged out the Georgia 2 team by a margin of 2½–1½, needing Vladimir Kramnik to provide the match win. India comfortably defeated Canada while England edged out Brazil when Gawain Jones held a difficult endgame against Krikor Mekhitarian. France took the overall lead by defeating Algeria 3½–½, for a total game score of 11½/12, closely followed by Israel who beat Iceland by the same margin for a score of 11. A total of 18 teams had perfect match scores of 3/3.

=== Round 4 ===
The top encounter of the fourth round took place on the third table, where the United States recorded a 2½-1½ but comfortable win over India. Pentala Harikrishna and Krishnan Sasikiran drew their games with the white pieces against Wesley So and Samuel Shankland, respectively, in less than two hours. The game between Hikaru Nakamura and Vidit Santosh Gujrathi also ended in a draw, while on top board Fabiano Caruana defeated Vishwanathan Anand in 26 moves. Poland provided an upset against Russia, as Kramnik and Dmitry Jakovenko fell to Jacek Tomczak and Kamil Dragun. China, Azerbaijan, Ukraine and France maintained their winning starts, at the expense of Croatia, England, Argentina and Vietnam. The Czech Republic defeated Iran, despite David Navara taking a rest; Viktor Láznička stepped up to board 1 and scored the decisive win over world junior champion Parham Maghsoodloo. Israel and Armenia both recorded 3–1 wins in their matches against Sweden and Greece to remain on maximum board points.

=== Round 5 ===
The fifth round saw another upset, as the China–Czech Republic match ended 1–3. Yu Yangyi was outplayed by Láznička, while Jiří Štoček capitalised on a mistake to win with black against Wei Yi. Poland continued their strong form by defeating France 3–1, and Azerbaijan edged out their rivals Armenia 2½–1½. The United States were held to a draw by Israel, which left Ukraine as the only other team to maintain their winning streak after they defeated Spain.

=== Round 6 ===
The four remaining teams on a perfect score faced off against each other. Azerbaijan recorded a convincing 3–1 victory over the Czech Republic, while Poland defeated Ukraine thanks to 20-year-old Jan-Krzysztof Duda's 32-move win against Vassily Ivanchuk. The United States bested Bosnia and Herzegovina 3½–½, with the only negative being Nakamura's draw to IM Dejan Marjanović. Russia–India, England–France and Israel–Germany all ended in draws.

=== Round 7 ===
The top pairing in round 7 saw Azerbaijan and Poland draw on all boards. The United States defeated 18th-seeded Croatia 3–1 to join Azerbaijan and Poland on 13/14. Wesley So and Sam Shankland won with white, and Caruana and Nakamura recorded draws with black. Armenia's 2½–1½ win over Belarus saw them rise to clear fourth with 12/14, as the China–Ukraine, Germany–Netherlands and Israel–Czech Republic matches were all drawn.

=== Round 8 ===
A sole leader was established for the first time in the tournament as the United States defeated Azerbaijan 2½–1½. Teimour Radjabov struck first on board 2, defeating So. This was followed by Nakamura being held by Arkadij Naiditsch to another draw. Caruana equalised the score by defeating Mamedyarov, then Shankland with black converted the point against Rauf Mamedov to give the victory to the United States. The Poland–Armenia match ended with four draws, with Duda holding well against Aronian on top board. India defeated the Czech Republic 2½–1½, with three draws and one decisive game. It was the same scenario in the Israel–England match, where Luke McShane scored against Maxim Rodshtein. Germany defeated Spain by 2½–1½, with Daniel Fridman improving his score to 6½/7 as he defeated Josep Manuel Lopez Martinez. A 2½–1½ result was also seen in the France–Ukraine and China–Netherlands matches.

=== Round 9 ===
Poland defeated the United States 2½–1½ to take first place. So and Shankland were held to draws with white, while Nakamura lost to Piorun and Caruana missed a win in a rook and bishop versus rook endgame against Duda. China and Armenia recorded 2½–1½ victories over Azerbaijan and India, respectively, to stay in contention for gold. England defeated Norway 3–1 to reach 15/18 along with the United States, China and Armenia.

=== Round 10 ===
China inflicted Poland's first defeat in the Olympiad as Ding Liren and Li Chao recorded wins. The United States defeated Armenia 2½–1½ to join China on 17/20, thus setting up a US–China clash for the gold medal in the final round. Russia and France won against England and Croatia, respectively, to both move up to joint-third place with Poland. Azerbaijan suffered their third successive 2½–1½ loss, this time to Ukraine, leaving them on 13/20 and out of the running for a podium place.

=== Round 11 ===
The derby match of the last round was contested by China and the United States on the top table, which ended in a tie with four draws. Russia narrowly beat France 2½-1½ thanks to Ian Nepomniachtchi's win against Étienne Bacrot on the second board and equalised the number of match points of China and the United States on the top. The tie-break, however, determined that China to win the gold, United States the silver and Russia the bronze medal. On the other top tables, the matches India-Poland, Germany-Armenia and Ukraine-Czech Republic were all tied, while England crushed Kazakhstan 3½–½ to climb to the fifth position overall.

== Final standings ==
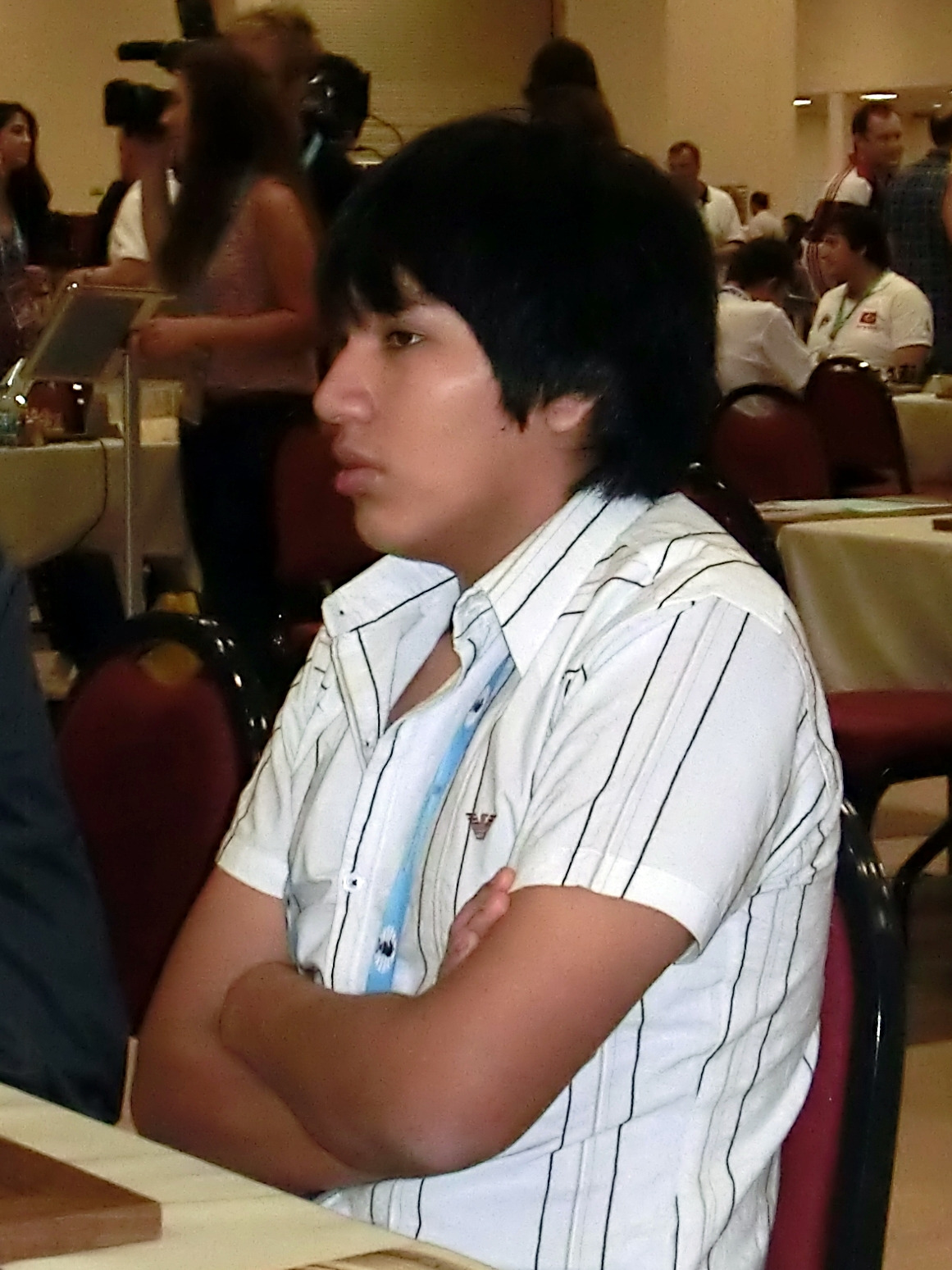
Jorge Cori of Peru won the individual gold medal in the Open event.

China won the gold medal in the open event for the second time after they have previously claimed the title in 2014. They scored eight wins, two draws and one loss for a total of 18 match points. The same result was achieved by the United States and Russia, who had inferior tie-breakers and came up on the podium by winning the silver and bronze medal, respectively. United States were on track to defending the title and were the sole leader after eight rounds, but their loss to Poland in the ninth round set them back from winning the gold. Despite the slow start and implausible play, Russia finished the tournament with four consecutive victories to catch China and the United States, which was only enough for the third place because of the relatively weaker schedule. Poland were the biggest surprise of the tournament. They scored minimal match victories against the two top seeds, Russia in the fourth and the United States in the ninth round, and topped the table as sole leader after nine rounds. Their loss to China in the penultimate and tie with India in the ultimate round, however, placed them on the fourth place overall with 17 match points, which was only equaled by England who came on the fifth place at the end. The only unbeaten team in the open event was Germany with five wins and six draws but this score earned them only the 13th place. Teams that disappointed the most were Azerbaijan (the fourth seeds) who finished in 15th place, Israel in 39th place, and Netherlands in 40th place.

Jorge Cori of Peru, playing on board three, was the best individual player in the open event by scoring 7½ out of 8 points (seven wins and one draw) with a performance rating of 2925. The other gold medalists include Ding Liren of China on board one who scored 5½ out of 8 points with a performance rating of 2873, Nguyễn Ngọc Trường Sơn of Vietnam on board two who scored 8½ out of 10 points with a performance rating of 2804, Daniel Fridman of Germany who scored 7½ out of 9 points with a performance rating of 2814, and Anton Korobov of Ukraine as reserve player who scored 6½ out of 8 points with a performance rating of 2773.

=== Team standings ===
Open event
#	Country	Players	Average rating	MP	dSB
1	China	Ding, Yu, Wei, Bu, Li	2756	18	372.5
2	United States	Caruana, So, Nakamura, Shankland, Robson	2772	18	360.5
3	Russia	Karjakin, Nepomniachtchi, Kramnik, Vitiugov, Jakovenko	2764	18	354.5
4	Poland	Duda, Wojtaszek, Piorun, Tomczak, Dragun	2673	17	390.0
5	England	Adams, McShane, Howell, Jones, Pert	2688	17	340.0
6	India	Anand, Harikrishna, Vidit, Adhiban, Sasikiran	2724	16	388.0
7	Vietnam	Liêm, Sơn, Minh, Khoi, Hải	2576	16	379.5
8	Armenia	Aronian, Sargissian, Melkumyan, Hovhannisyan, Martirosyan	2688	16	371.0
9	France	Vachier-Lagrave, Bacrot, Fressinet, Édouard, Bauer	2688	16	366.0
10	Ukraine	Ivanchuk, Eljanov, Kryvoruchko, Ponomariov, Korobov	2698	16	337.0

Notes

- Average ratings calculated by chess-results.com based in September 2018 ratings.

=== Board standings ===
All board prizes were given out according to performance ratings for players who have played at least eight games at the tournament. Jorge Cori on the third board had the best performance of all players in the tournament. The winners of the gold medal on each board are listed in turn:

- Board 1: (China) Ding Liren 2873
- Board 2: (Vietnam) Nguyễn Ngọc Trường Sơn 2804
- Board 3: (Peru) Jorge Cori 2926
- Board 4: (Germany) Daniel Fridman 2814
- Reserve: (Ukraine) Anton Korobov 2773

=== Norms and titles ===
Seven players achieved Grandmaster norms, namely Denis Makhnev (Kazakhstan), Nodirbek Yakubboev (Uzbekistan), Johan-Sebastian Christiansen, Benjamin Arvola Notkevich (both from Norway), Urtnasan Nasanjargal (Mongolia), Titas Stremavicius (Lithuania) and Jonathan Westerberg (Sweden). A total of 11 players achieved International Master norms, 31 players were granted automatic FIDE Master titles for scoring 65% or more over 9 or more games and 93 were granted Candidate Master titles for scoring 50% or more.

== See also ==
- Women's event at the 43rd Chess Olympiad
