= 43rd Chess Olympiad =

2018 chess tournament in Batumi, Georgia

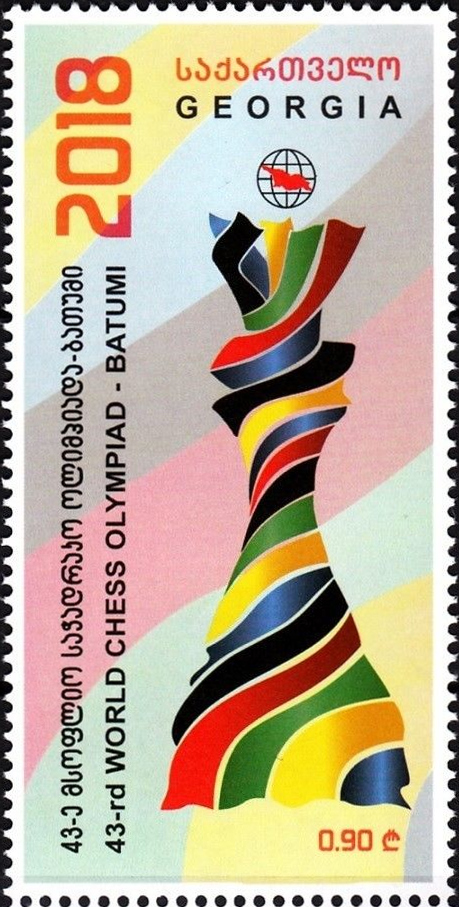
- Logo of the 43rd Chess Olympiad on a 2018 stamp of Georgia
- Host city: Batumi
- Country: Georgia
- Nations: 180 (Open); 146 (Women)
- Teams: 185 (Open); 151 (Women)
- Athletes: 1,667 (920 in Open and 747 in Women's event)
- Dates: 23 September – 6 October 2018
- Opened by: Giorgi Margvelashvili
- Main venue: Sport Palace Batumi

Medalists

Team (Open)
- 1st place, gold medalist(s): China
- 2nd place, silver medalist(s): United States
- 3rd place, bronze medalist(s): Russia

Team (Women)
- 1st place, gold medalist(s): China
- 2nd place, silver medalist(s): Ukraine
- 3rd place, bronze medalist(s): Georgia

Individual (Open)
- (Peru) Jorge Cori

Individual (Women)
- (China) Ju Wenjun

Gaprindashvili Trophy
- China

The 43rd Chess Olympiad (Georgian: 43-ე საჭადრაკო ოლიმპიადა, 43-e sach’adrak’o olimp’iada; also known as the Batumi Chess Olympiad), organised by the Fédération Internationale des Échecs (FIDE). It consisted of two main tournaments—an Open event, enabling participation of players from all genders, and a Women's event, enabling participation of female players only—as well as several events to promote chess. It was an international team chess event held in Batumi, Georgia, from 23 September to 6 October 2018. This was the first Chess Olympiad to take place in Georgia with the Georgian Chess Federation also hosting the Chess World Cup 2017 in Tbilisi.

The total number of participants was 1,667, with 920 in the Open and 747 in the Women's event. The number of registered teams was 185 from 180 nations in the Open section and 151 from 146 nations in the Women's section. Both sections set team participation records. The main venue of the Chess Olympiad was Sport Palace Batumi, while the opening ceremony took place in the Black Sea Arena and the closing ceremony was held in the Batumi State Music Centre. The Chief Arbiter of the event was Greece's International Arbiter Takis Nikolopoulos.

China won the gold medal in both the Open and Women's event. This was the first time since 1986 that one country united the titles and China became the second nation to do so after the former Soviet Union. China won their second gold medal in the Open event after they had previously claimed their first title in 2014 and defended their title won in 2016 to claim their sixth title overall in the Women's event. Peruvian player Jorge Cori, who played on the third board, was the best individual player in the Open event by scoring 7½ out of 8 points (seven wins and one draw) with a performance rating of 2925. Chinese reigning Women's World Chess Champion Ju Wenjun, playing on the first board, was the best individual player in the Women's event by scoring 7 out of 9 points (five wins and four draws), with a performance rating of 2661.

The 89th FIDE Congress also took place during the event at which Russian politician and economist Arkady Dvorkovich was elected new President of FIDE following Kirsan Ilyumzhinov's withdrawal because of the United States Department of the Treasury's sanctions imposed against him for his alleged support to the Syrian government in the Syrian Civil War.

== Bidding process ==
The bidding procedure for the 43rd Chess Olympiad and the FIDE Congress in connection with a possible bid for the Chess World Cup 2017 was opened in September 2013. Each city interested to host the event had to submit their bid to FIDE by 31 March 2014. The bids were to guarantee that all necessary provisions in accordance with the Olympiad Regulations of the FIDE Handbook would be covered by the organiser, including articles 4.1, 4.2 and 4.3 pertaining to the organising committee, finances, and provision of amenities and stipends, respectively. FIDE received bids to host the events from the national federations of Georgia and South Africa. South Africa proposed Sun City as candidate city to host the Chess World Cup and Cape Town for the Chess Olympiad, while Georgia proposed Tbilisi to host the Chess World Cup and Batumi for the Chess Olympiad. Former World Chess Champion Garry Kasparov expressed support for the South African bid during his FIDE presidential campaign.

The final decision was made at the 85th FIDE Congress in August 2014 in Tromsø. Georgia's bid won, receiving 93 votes to South Africa's 58.

== Preparations ==
The proposed budget for both events exceeded 20 million US dollars. Some 1.6 million US dollars were allocated for the travel fund for participants from 80 countries, while around 2 million US dollars were set aside for parallel development and promotion programmes in Europe and the rest of the world. The organisers of the tournament named several "Goodwill Ambassadors", including famous chess players like Nona Gaprindashvili, Maia Chiburdanidze, Judit Polgár, Viswanathan Anand, as well as other domestic personalities like operatic mezzo-soprano Anita Rachvelishvili, conductor and composer Nikoloz Rachveli and weightlifter Lasha Talakhadze.

=== Venues ===
The activities during the Chess Olympiad took place in three different venues. The tournament rounds took place in the Sport Palace Batumi, while the opening ceremony was held in the Black Sea Arena and the closing ceremony was held in the Batumi State Music Centre.

- The Sport Palace Batumi is a modern spacious complex whose construction started in 2016 and was completed in 2018. The Chess Olympiad is the first sporting event to be held there. The venue is intended to host different kinds of sports and combines two halls: the large hall with capacity for 2,500 spectators, and the small one for 600 spectators.
- The Black Sea Arena is the largest concert hall in Georgia with a total capacity of 10,000 seats placed in circular grandstands. It is located near the village of Shekvetili, some 45 km north of Batumi. The construction of the hall started in 2008 with a total cost exceeding 200 million lari (around 93 million US dollars). It has an open roof at about 25 m above the ground level, while the stage spans a total area of 930 m^{2}. Over the last couple of years, the venue has hosted concerts of famous music artists such like Christina Aguilera, Scorpions and Aerosmith.
- The Batumi State Music Centre was re-constructed in 2011 from a plan made by Georgian architect Vakhtang Khmaladze. The hall has modern equipment with 1,100 Spanish arm-chairs and a big Spanish chandelier. On the third floor, it has an exhibition space, where pop and jazz concerts can be held.

=== Anti-cheating measures ===
In September 2018, FIDE announced the anti-cheating measures and procedures of the 43rd Chess Olympiad in accordance with the Abu Dhabi FIDE Executive Board in 2015 and the Moscow FIDE Presidential Board in 2016, as well as after clarifications of the FIDE WCOC Commission and FIDE Anti cheating Committee that were applied at the Baku Chess Olympiad. According to these measures, players and captains had to be inspected by the security staff at the entrance of the playing hall. The carrying of mobile phones, watches, and pens was not allowed inside the playing venue and players were required to release them in storage areas. Players and captains were obliged to show up at the entrance at least 30 minutes before the start of the round and those arriving later were forfeited. Fast random checks were performed by anti-cheating arbiters on approximately 20 to 30 players during each round but checks were not done during the first time control and close to the end of the game. If any indication on cheating was found, thorough check would have followed. Similar checks were performed immediately after the end of the games in each round on approximately 10 to 20 players with the application of the same procedure. Priority for checking had players who have won their games. Special attention was also given to the matches played on the top tables with about 10 players thoroughly checked in each round. The selection of players who had to be checked in each round was made by the Senior Arbiter for anti-cheating in cooperation with the Chief Arbiter.

== The event ==
=== Opening ceremony ===
The opening ceremony was held on 23 September in the Black Sea Arena under the name "CHESS Stories" coined by Georgian writer Aka Morchiladze and was broadcast live on 1TV, the official website of the event and the social media. The first act was a play dedicated to the legend of the invention of chess and featured the famous wheat and chessboard problem. Then, video messages were presented by the Goodwill Ambassadors of the 43rd Chess Olympiad and speeches were delivered by the Minister of Education and Science of Georgia Mikheil Batiashvili, the Chairman of the Government of Adjara Tornike Rizhvadze, FIDE Deputy President Georgios Makropoulos and the President of Georgia Giorgi Margvelashvili. FIDE Deputy President Makropoulos welcomed all participants at the Olympiad, stressed the need for a new era of politically and financially independent FIDE and presenting a very positive vision in his speech, and later declared the Chess Olympiad open. Next, the national anthem of Georgia and the anthem of FIDE before the flag-bearers paraded on the stage.

The ceremony continued with stage performances that united the representatives of classical and modern cultures. Georgian conductor Nikoloz Memanishvili directed a concert performed by the Evgeni Mikeladze State Symphony Orchestra, ballerina Nina Ananiashvili choreographed a ballet performance, and Sukhieshvili ensemble presented a new dance. Among others who made appearance on the stage were famous Georgian singers Nino Katamadze, Liza Bagrationi and Giorgi Ushikishvili, baritone Lado Ataneli, violist Giorgi Tsagareli, the indie rock band Nika Kocharov & Young Georgian Lolitaz, the folklore ensemble Lashari and the Batumi cappella.

The last part of the ceremony was marked with the drawing of colours and was assisted by the batumi Chess Olympiad Goodwill Ambassador Vishwanathan Anand and Georgian chess player Nana Dzagnidze who joined Chief Arbiter Takis Nikolopoulos on the stage. The colours had to be decided in a unique way by white and black pearls hidden inside two seashells. Anand picked the white pearl that decided that United States as top seeds in the open event would play with the white pieces on the top board of the first round and Dzagnidze picked the black one that determined Russia as top seeds in the women's event to play with black on board one of the same round.

The opening ceremony ended with fireworks displayed above the Black Sea Arena.

=== Participating teams ===
The number of 185 teams, representing 180 national federations, set a record. Georgia as a host country fielded three teams; there were also teams representing blind, deaf and physically disabled players. The women's tournament was contested by a record of 151 teams, representing 146 federations. The Netherlands Antilles, albeit a non-existing entity since 2010, are allowed to field teams under this name, because the Curaçao Chess Federation remains officially registered as representing the dissolved country in the FIDE Directory.

Participating teams in the 43rd Chess Olympiad
- Afghanistan
- Albania
- Algeria
- Andorra
- Angola
- Antigua and Barbuda
- Argentina
- Armenia
- Aruba
- Australia
- Austria
- Azerbaijan
- Bahamas
- Bahrain
- Bangladesh
- Barbados
- Belarus
- Belgium
- Bermuda
- Bolivia
- Bosnia and Herzegovina
- Botswana
- Brazil
- Brunei
- Burundi
- Cameroon
- Canada
- Cape Verde
- Central African Republic
- Chile
- China
- Chinese Taipei
- Colombia
- Republic of the Congo
- Costa Rica
- Croatia
- Cuba
- Cyprus
- Czech Republic
- Denmark
- Djibouti
- Dominican Republic
- Ecuador
- Egypt
- El Salvador
- England
- Eritrea
- Estonia
- Ethiopia
- Faroe Islands
- Finland
- France
- Gabon
- Gambia
- Georgia (host nation)
- Georgia-2
- Georgia-3
- Germany
- Ghana
- Greece
- Guam
- Guatemala
- Guernsey
- Guyana
- Haiti
- Honduras
- Hong Kong
- Hungary
- IBCA
- ICCD
- Iceland
- India
- Indonesia
- IPCA
- Iran
- Iraq
- Ireland
- Israel
- Italy
- Ivory Coast
- Jamaica
- Japan
- Jersey
- Jordan
- Kazakhstan
- Kenya
- Kosovo
- Kuwait
- Kyrgyzstan
- Latvia
- Lebanon
- Lesotho
- Liberia
- Libya
- Liechtenstein
- Lithuania
- Luxembourg
- Macau
- Macedonia
- Madagascar
- Malawi
- Malaysia
- Maldives
- Mali
- Malta
- Mauritania
- Mauritius
- Mexico
- Moldova
- Monaco
- Mongolia
- Montenegro
- Morocco
- Mozambique
- Myanmar
- Namibia
- Nauru
- Nepal
- Netherlands
- (Curaçao) Netherlands Antilles
- New Zealand
- Nicaragua
- Nigeria
- Norway
- Oman
- ~~Pakistan~~
- Palau
- Palestine
- Panama
- Papua New Guinea
- Paraguay
- Peru
- Philippines
- Poland
- Portugal
- Puerto Rico
- Qatar
- Romania
- Russia
- Rwanda
- San Marino
- São Tomé and Príncipe
- Saudi Arabia
- Scotland
- Senegal
- Serbia
- Seychelles
- Sierra Leone
- Singapore
- Slovakia
- Slovenia
- Somalia
- South Africa
- South Korea
- South Sudan
- Spain
- Sri Lanka
- Sudan
- Suriname
- Eswatini
- Sweden
- Switzerland
- Syria
- Tajikistan
- Tanzania
- Thailand
- Timor-Leste
- Togo
- Trinidad and Tobago
- Tunisia
- Turkey
- Turkmenistan
- Uganda
- Ukraine
- United Arab Emirates
- United States
- US Virgin Islands
- Uruguay
- Uzbekistan
- Venezuela
- Vietnam
- Wales
- Yemen
- Zambia
- Zimbabwe

Notes

- Countries in italics denote those fielding teams in the open event only.
- Pakistan were unable to compete after the team were denied exit visas by their government.

=== Competition format and calendar ===
The tournament was played in a Swiss system format. The time control for all games was 90 minutes for the first 40 moves, after which an additional 30 minutes were granted and increment of 30 seconds per move was applied. Players were permitted to offer a draw at any time. A total of 11 rounds were played, with all teams playing in every round.

In each round, four players from each team faced four players from another team; teams were permitted one reserve player who could be substituted between rounds. The four games were played simultaneously on four boards, scoring 1 game point for a win and ½ game point for a draw. The scores from each game were summed together to determine which team won the round. Winning a round was worth 2 match points, regardless of the game point margin, while drawing a round was worth 1 match point. Teams were ranked in a table based on match points. Tie-breakers for the table were i) the Sonneborn-Berger system; ii) total game points scored; iii) the sum of the match points of the opponents, excluding the lowest one.

The opening ceremony of the Chess Olympiad took place at 21:00 GET (UTC+4) on 23 September and the closing ceremony at 20:00 GET (UTC+4) on 5 October. Tournament rounds started on 24 September and ended with the final round on 5 October. All rounds started at 15:00 GET (UTC+4), except for the final round which started at 11:00 GET (UTC+4). There was one rest day at the tournament—on 29 September—after the fifth round. In addition, the Captains' meeting took place at 09:30 GET (UTC+4) on 24 September, and the Arbiters meeting at 10:00 GET (UTC+4) on the same day.

All dates are GET (UTC+4)

OC	Opening ceremony	A	Arbiters meeting	C	Captains meeting	1	Round	RD	Rest day	CC	Closing ceremony

September/October	23rd Sun	24th Mon	25th Tue	26th Wed	27th Thu	28th Fri	29th Sat	30th Sun	1st Mon	2nd Tue	3rd Wed	4th Thu	5th Fri
Ceremonies	OC												CC
Meetings		C											
Meetings		A											
Tournament round		1	2	3	4	5	RD	6	7	8	9	10	11

=== Open event ===
The open section of the tournament was contested by a record number of 185 teams, representing 180 nations. Georgia, as host nation, fielded three teams, whilst the International Braille Chess Association (IBCA), the International Physically Disabled Chess Association (IPCA), and the International Chess Committee of the Deaf (ICCD) each provided one team.

The tournament featured nine out of the top ten players from the FIDE rating list published in September 2018 with only then-World Champion Magnus Carlsen being absent. Former World Champion Vishwanathan Anand returned to the Chess Olympiads on board one for India following a break of twelve years. Other players who played in the open section include the former World Chess Champion Vladimir Kramnik, the challenger in the World Chess Championship 2018 Fabiano Caruana, as well as the former challengers Sergey Karjakin and Boris Gelfand. Grandmaster Eugenio Torre, who was in the line-up of the Philippines for a record twenty-three times between 1970 and 2016 and was the highest-scoring player at the 42nd Chess Olympiad, decided not to play and was named coach of the Philippines national team in the open section. Former FIDE World Champion Veselin Topalov did not play because a dispute between chess officials caused de-recognition of the Bulgarian Chess Federation by FIDE.

This was the first time Russia had not been the top-ranked team before the start of a Chess Olympiad since their first entry in 1992 following the dissolution of the Soviet Union, conceding the top spot to the United States, who were defending the title won at the previous Olympiad. The United States were playing with the same line-up that won the gold medal with Fabiano Caruana, Hikaru Nakamura, Wesley So, Samuel Shankland and Ray Robson, whose average rating was 2772. Russia as the second strongest team made changes in the line-up compared to the Baku Chess Olympiad, where Dmitry Jakovenko and Nikita Vitiugov replaced Alexander Grischuk and Evgeny Tomashevsky alongside Vladimir Kramnik, Sergey Karjakin and Ian Nepomniachtchi. China had the third highest pre-tournament rating of 2756 and four players from Baku on the team, including Ding Liren, Li Chao, Wei Yi and Yu Yangyi, while Wang Yue was replaced by Bu Xiangzhi. Other teams among the top seeds with average ratings above 2700 were Azerbaijan led by FIDE Grand Prix 2017 winner Shakhriyar Mamedyarov and India was strengthened with Vishwanathan Anand on the team.

==== Open summary ====
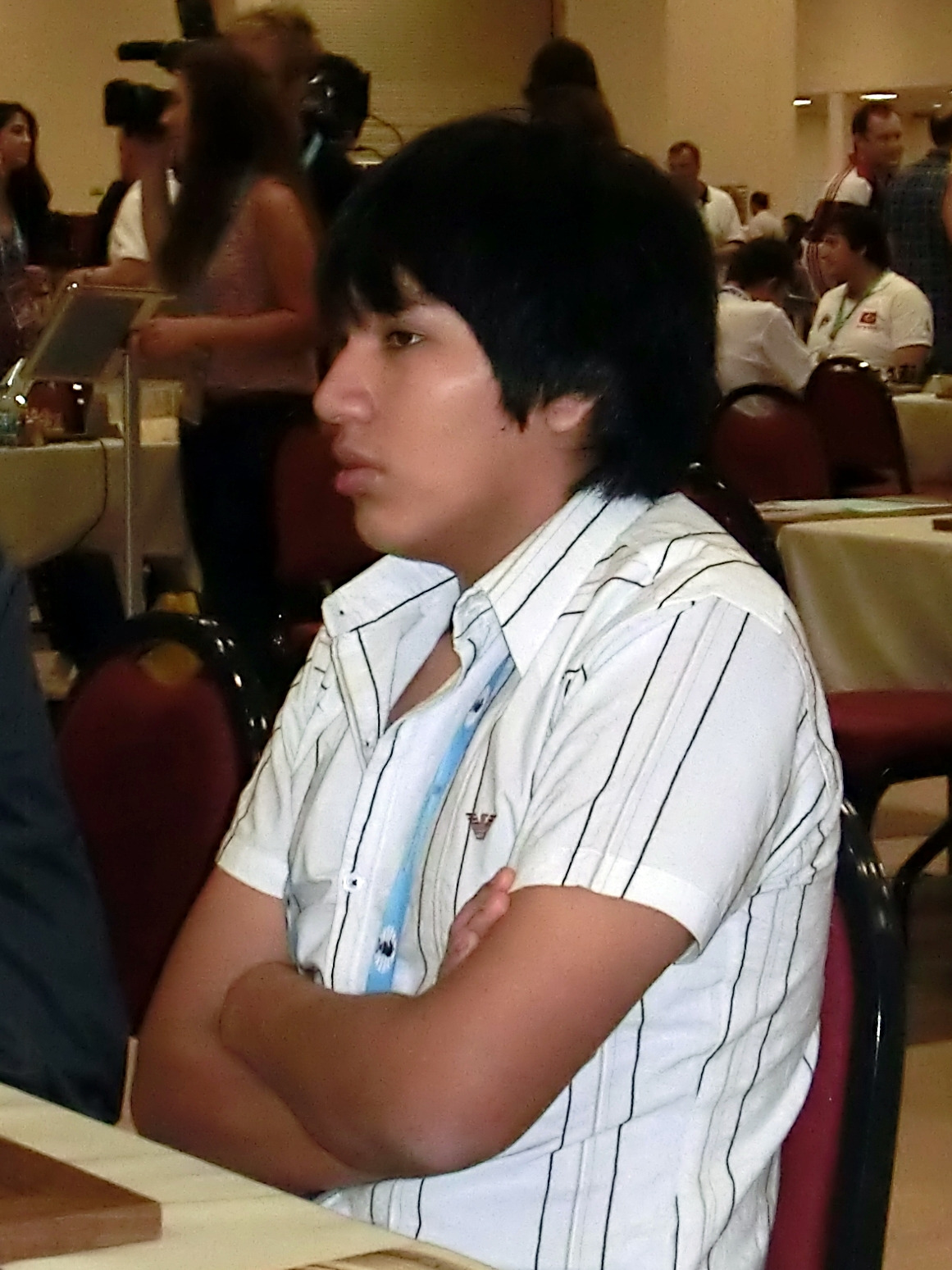
Jorge Cori of Peru was the best individual player in the Open event.

China won the gold medal in the open event for the second time after they have previously claimed the title in 2014. They scored eight wins, two draws and one loss for a total of 18 match points. The same result was achieved by the United States and Russia, who had inferior tie-breakers and came up on the podium by winning the silver and bronze medal, respectively. United States were on track to defending the title and were the sole leader after eight rounds, but their loss to Poland in the ninth round set them back from winning the gold. Despite the slow start and implausible play, Russia finished the tournament with four consecutive victories to catch China and the United States, which was only enough for the third place because of the relatively weaker schedule. Poland were the biggest surprise of the tournament. They scored minimal match victories against the two top seeds, Russia in the fourth and the United States in the ninth round, and topped the table as sole leader after nine rounds. Their loss to China in the penultimate and tie with India in the ultimate round, however, placed them on the fourth place overall with 17 match points, which was only equaled by England who came in the fifth place at the end. The only unbeaten team in the open event was Germany with five wins and six draws but this score earned them only the 13th place. Teams that disappointed the most were Azerbaijan (the fourth seeds) who finished in 15th place, Israel in 39th place, and the Netherlands in 40th place.

Jorge Cori of Peru, playing on board three, was the best individual player in the open event by scoring 7½ out of 8 points (seven wins and one draw) with a performance rating of 2925. The other gold medalists include Ding Liren of China on board one who scored 5½ out of 8 points with a performance rating of 2873, Nguyễn Ngọc Trường Sơn of Vietnam on board two who scored 8½ out of 10 points with a performance rating of 2804, Daniel Fridman of Germany on board four who scored 7½ out of 9 points with a performance rating of 2814, and Anton Korobov of Ukraine as a reserve player who scored 6½ out of 8 points with a performance rating of 2773.

Open event
#	Country	Players	Average rating	MP	dSB
1	China	Ding Liren, Yu Yangyi, Wei Yi, Bu Xiangzhi, Li Chao	2756	18	372.5
2	United States	Caruana, So, Nakamura, Shankland, Robson	2772	18	360.5
3	Russia	Karjakin, Nepomniachtchi, Kramnik, Vitiugov, Jakovenko	2764	18	354.5
4	Poland	Duda, Wojtaszek, Piorun, Tomczak, Dragun	2673	17	390.0
5	England	Adams, McShane, Howell, Jones, Pert	2688	17	340.0
6	India	Anand, Harikrishna, Gujrathi, Adhiban, Sasikiran	2724	16	388.0
7	Vietnam	Lê Quang Liêm, Nguyễn Ngọc Trường Sơn, Trần Tuấn Minh, Nguyễn Anh Khôi, Đào Thiên Hải	2576	16	379.5
8	Armenia	Aronian, Sargissian, Melkumyan, Hovhannisyan, Martirosyan	2688	16	371.0
9	France	Vachier-Lagrave, Bacrot, Fressinet, Édouard, Bauer	2688	16	366.0
10	Ukraine	Ivanchuk, Eljanov, Kryvoruchko, Ponomariov, Korobov	2698	16	337.0

Notes

- Average ratings calculated by chess-results.com based in September 2018 ratings.

All board prizes were given out according to performance ratings for players who played at least eight games at the tournament. Jorge Cori on the third board had the best performance of all players in the tournament. The winners of the gold medal on each board are listed in turn:

- Board 1: (China) Ding Liren 2873
- Board 2: (Vietnam) Nguyễn Ngọc Trường Sơn 2804
- Board 3: (Peru) Jorge Cori 2926
- Board 4: (Germany) Daniel Fridman 2814
- Reserve: (Ukraine) Anton Korobov 2773

=== Women's event ===
The Women's event was contested by a record number of 151 teams, representing 146 nations. Georgia, as host nation, fielded three teams, whilst the International Physically Disabled Chess Association (IPCA) and the International Chess Committee of the Deaf (ICCD) each provided one team.

The women's section featured most of the top players according to the FIDE rating list published in September 2018 with the highest rated female player Hou Yifan and the former Women's World Champion Tan Zhongyi not playing for China. Former Women's World Champions Alexandra Kosteniuk, Anna Ushenina and Mariya Muzychuk were part of their national teams, while Antoaneta Stefanova did not play because of the controversy with the Bulgarian Chess Federation. Sweden's Pia Cramling, who first played at the Chess Olympiads in 1978, was also not playing because of a row about captaincy.

The team with highest average pre-tournament rating of 2523 was Russia, who were playing with the same line-up from the Baku Chess Olympiad, including former Women's World Champion Alexandra Kosteniuk, Alexandra Goryachkina, Valentina Gunina, Natalia Pogonina and Olga Girya. Second strongest team were Ukraine with Anna and Mariya Muzychuk playing on the top two boards, Anna Ushenina, Natalia Zhukova and Iulija Osmak. The defending champions China without Hou Yifan and Tan Zhongyi were the third seeds. The first of the three Georgian teams were also among the favourites with the fourth highest pre-tournament rating. They were playing with Nana Dzagnidze on the top board, Lela Javakhishvili, Nino Batsiashvili, Bela Khotenashvili and Meri Arabidze.

==== Women’s summary ====
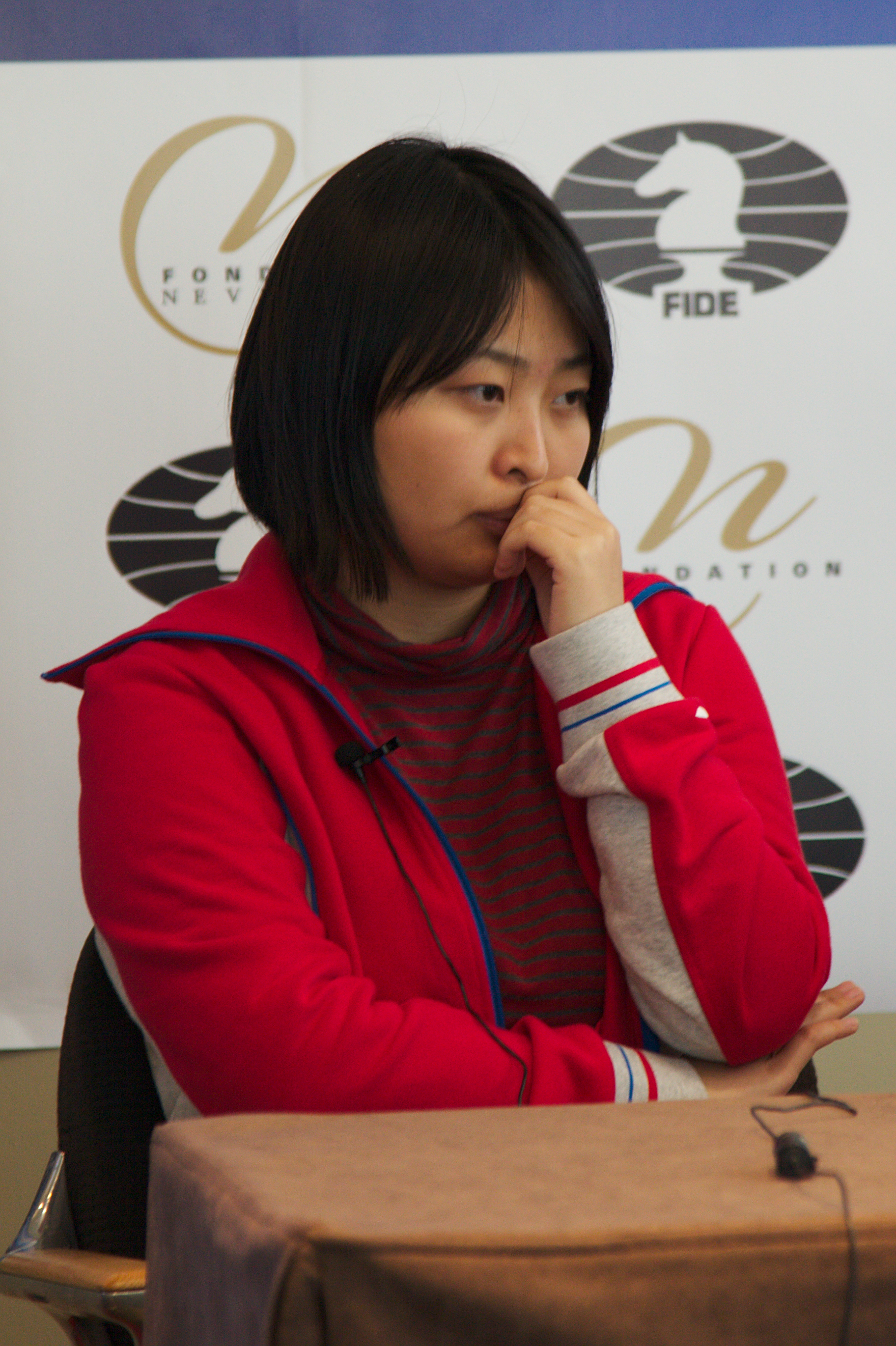
Women's World Chess Champion Ju Wenjun of China was the best individual player in the Women's event.

China successfully defended the gold medal won in 2016 and claimed their sixth title overall. The team scored seven wins and four draws for a total of 18 match points. This exact achievement was matched only by Ukraine, who had inferior tie-breaker and won the silver medal. These two teams were also the only unbeaten in the Women's event. Host nation Georgia finished solely in the third place and won the bronze medal with seven wins, three draws and one loss for a total of 17 match points. Russia, who were top seeds before the tournament, finished immediately after the podium in the fourth place after suffering losses to Uzbekistan in the second and Armenia in the sixth round, and being only in the 24th place after seven rounds. They scored 16 match points and had the highest tie-breaker among the nine teams with the same number of points. Armenia, who were the sole leader after seven rounds, occupied the seventh place at the end. Georgia's second team did also earn spot in the top ten, finishing on the ninth place overall. Teams that disappointed include Poland who finished in 16th place and Germany who finished in 28th place.

Women's World Chess Champion Ju Wenjun of China, playing on board one, was the best individual player in the Women's event by scoring 7 out of 9 (five wins and four draws) with a performance rating of 2661. On the other boards, the gold medals were won by Mariya Muzychuk of Ukraine on board two with 8 out of 10 and a performance rating of 2616, Khanim Balajayeva of Azerbaijan on board three who scored 7 out of 9 with a performance rating of 2522, Marina Brunello of Italy on board four with 8½ out of 10 and a performance rating of 2505, and Boshra Alshaebyi of Jordan as a reserve player with 8 out of 8 and a performance rating of 2568.

Women's event
#	Country	Players	Average rating	MP	dSB
1	China	Ju, Shen, Huang, Lei, Zhai	2485	18	407.0
2	Ukraine	A. Muzychuk, M. Muzychuk, Ushenina, Zhukova, Osmak	2486	18	395.5
3	Georgia	Dzagnidze, Javakhishvili, Batsiashvili, Khotenashvili, Arabidze	2484	17	
4	Russia	Kosteniuk, Goryachkina, Gunina, Pogonina, Girya	2523	16	379.5
5	Hungary	Hoang, A. Gara, T. Gara, Lakos, Terbe	2344	16	372.0
6	Armenia	Danielian, Mkrtchian, Sargsyan, Kursova, Ghukasyan	2353	16	366.0
7	United States	Zatonskih, Krush, Abrahamyan, Foisor, Yu	2382	16	359.5
8	India	Koneru, Dronavalli, Sachdev, Karavade, Rout	2458	16	352.5
9	Georgia-2	Melia, Charkhalashvili, Gvetadze, Khukhashvili, Mikadze	2334	16	351.5
10	Azerbaijan	Mammadzada, Mamedyarova, Balajayeva, Mammadova, Fataliyeva	2369	16	347.5

Notes

- Average ratings calculated by chess-results.com based in September 2018 ratings.

All board prizes were given out according to performance ratings for players who have played at least eight games at the tournament. Ju Wenjun on the first board had the best performance of all players in the tournament. The winners of the gold medal on each board are listed in turn:

- Board 1: (China) Ju Wenjun 2661
- Board 2: (Ukraine) Mariya Muzychuk 2616
- Board 3: (Azerbaijan) Khanim Balajayeva 2522
- Board 4: (Italy) Marina Brunello 2505
- Reserve: (Jordan) Boshra Alshaebyi 2568

=== Gaprindashvili Trophy ===
The Nona Gaprindashvili Trophy, created by FIDE in 1997 and named after the former women's World Champion (1961–78), was awarded to China, having scored the highest total number of match points in the open and women's events combined.

#	Team	MP	dSB
1	China	36	
2	Russia	34	734.0
3	Ukraine	34	732.5

== FIDE Congress ==
The 89th FIDE Congress took place during the Olympiad, specifically from 26 September to 14 October; the General Assembly was held from 3 to 5 October 2018.

=== FIDE presidential election ===
The FIDE presidential election took place on 3 October 2018. Long-serving FIDE President Kirsan Ilyumzhinov announced his withdrawal from the presidency earlier that year following a controversy regarding the sanctions imposed by the United States Department of the Treasury for his alleged support to the Syrian government in the Syrian Civil War. Three candidates entered the presidential run: FIDE Deputy President George Makropoulos of Greece (nominated by 64 national federations), politician and economist Arkady Dvorkovich of Russia (nominated by 13 national federations), and former World Chess Champion challenger Nigel Short of England (nominated by 6 national federations). On the election day, Short announced his withdrawal from the run in favour of Dvorkovich's nomination. Dvorkovich ultimately won the election against Makropoulos with 103 to 78 votes.

== Marketing ==
=== Mascot ===
The mascot of the 43rd Chess Olympiad was a green turtle with a chessboard depicted on its shell that was wearing glasses and a tie with the colours from the tournament's official logo. It was publicly introduced during the celebration of the country's centenary Independence Day held in Tbilisi on 26 May 2018 by the Minister of Culture and Sports Mikheil Giorgadze together with the Director of the Organising Committee Zurab Azmaiparashvili and Georgian grandmaster Giorgi Giorgadze. On the Rustaveli Avenue, an election of the mascot's name also took place.

=== Postage stamp ===
In May 2018, it was announced that the Cabinet of Georgia has approved a postage stamp commemorating the 43rd Chess Olympiad.

=== Sponsorship ===
The sponsors of the event included: SOCAR, Turkish Airlines, Georgian Public Broadcasting, Hytera, Gurieli and Aqua Geo.

== Concerns and controversies ==
=== Bulgarian Chess Federation suspension ===
On 10 September 2016, the European Chess Union held its General Assembly during the 42nd Chess Olympiad in Baku, where it voted 37–11 to suspend the Bulgarian Chess Federation (BCF). Later the same month, FIDE published a timeline of facts based on a number of complaints and allegations that had been brought to its Ethics Commission and General Assembly at the 88th FIDE Congress that took place at the Baku Chess Olympiad concerning the BCF. The timeline, among other things, included allegations of financial and administrative irregularities during the organisation of the 2013 European Youth Chess Championship in Budva, establishment of an imposter company in Delaware, the unlawful ban of Kiril Georgiev, Metodi Stoinev and Simeon Stoichkov, non-compliance of the BCF with the decisions made by the FIDE Ethics Commission and FIDE General Assembly in Baku, and refusal of the BCF to cooperate with the European Chess Union. On 30 September 2016, the BCF filed an appeal to the Court of Arbitration for Sport against its suspension. The court dismissed the appeal at a hearing in Lausanne on 28 April 2017 following an exchange of written submissions from both sides.

In the absence of resolution, Bulgaria was not allowed to send teams to the Batumi Chess Olympiad because its federation was not recognised by FIDE, which left former FIDE World Chess Champion Veselin Topalov and former Women's World Chess Champion Antoaneta Stefanova out of the tournament. On the other hand, some Bulgarian players switched to other federations and were allowed to participate at the event under different flags, most notably Ivan Cheparinov to Georgia, Kiril Georgiev to Macedonia (a country that he had previously represented at the 35th Chess Olympiad in 2002), and Boris Chatalbashev to Denmark.

=== FIDE presidential transition ===
In November 2015, the United States sanctioned FIDE President Kirsan Ilyumzhinov for being part of a group "providing support to the government of Syria, including for facilitating Syrian government oil purchases from ISIL". United States Department of the Treasury accused Ilyumzhinov for materially assisting and acting for the Syrian government and the Central Bank of Syria, although no details were revealed about the nature of his involvement. The press release has also linked FIDE's head to the murder of Russian journalist Larisa Yudina in 1999, who was investigating an offshore business registration mechanism in Kalmykia tied to Ilyumzhinov and whose murderer was allegedly Ilyumzhinov's adviser while he was serving as President of Kalmykia. The sanctions came shortly before Ilyumzhinov's trip to the United States, where he was supposed to determine which city would host the World Chess Championship 2016. They were also not the first case for sanctioning Russian nationals related to chess on political grounds by the United States and were preceded by the sanctions against Russian businessman Gennady Timchenko in April 2014 because of the annexation of Crimea by the Russian Federation.

On 27 March 2017, FIDE's official website announced that Ilyumzhinov had allegedly resigned from his presidency on a meeting of FIDE Presidential Board that took place in Athens. Later he went on to publicly deny his resignation and told the Russian news agency TASS that FIDE officials wanted to oust him and that it was "the hand of the Americans". FIDE Executive Director Nigel Freeman the next day responded to Ilyumzhinov's statements that the information was untrue by saying that he actually threatened to resign and mentioned three times that he resigned at the end of the meeting. At a joint press conference together with the president of Russian Chess Federation Andrey Filatov at Central Chess Club in Moscow, Ilyumzhinov stated that he would remain FIDE President until the next general assembly. He also appealed to the chess federations and executive director Nigel Freeman to cancel the board meeting that he described as a waste of money. Filatov supported Ilyumzhinov and mentioned that he could not be removed from his presidential role against his will and the only way to do it is by the FIDE Congress. On 29 March, an open letter from FIDE Deputy President George Makropoulos was published on FIDE's official website. Makropoulos expressed support to his colleagues who had described Ilyumzhinov as verbally resigning and mentioned that no-one had asked him to resign. He also criticised his statements at the press conference and referred to "the recorded tape minutes of the meeting" as evidence.

In February 2018, FIDE announced that their bank accounts were closed by the Swiss bank UBS as a result of the sanctions. The letter published by FIDE Treasurer Adrian M. Siegel reported that the white-money strategy in Switzerland does not allow to do business with people on the sanction list of the United States Department of the Treasury. Furthermore, it was revealed that the Presidential Board unanimously decided to take measures on mitigating the risk by transferring Ilyumzhinov's duties to FIDE Deputy President Makropoulos in December 2015. The letter also reported that Ilyumzhinov had informed FIDE on multiple occasions that he would be removed from the sanction list in near future.

On 29 June 2018, FIDE's president Ilyumzhinov announced that he would withdraw his candidacy for the presidential election during the Batumi Chess Olympiad and expressed support for Russia's new candidate Arkady Dvorkovich.

== See also ==
- Chess World Cup 2017

== Notes ==
Preceded by 42nd Chess Olympiad; Baku, Azerbaijan	Chess Olympiad; 43rd Olympiad (2018); Batumi, Georgia	Succeeded by 44th Chess Olympiad; Chennai, India
