= Benjamin Arvola Notkevich =

Norwegian chess grandmaster (born 1993)

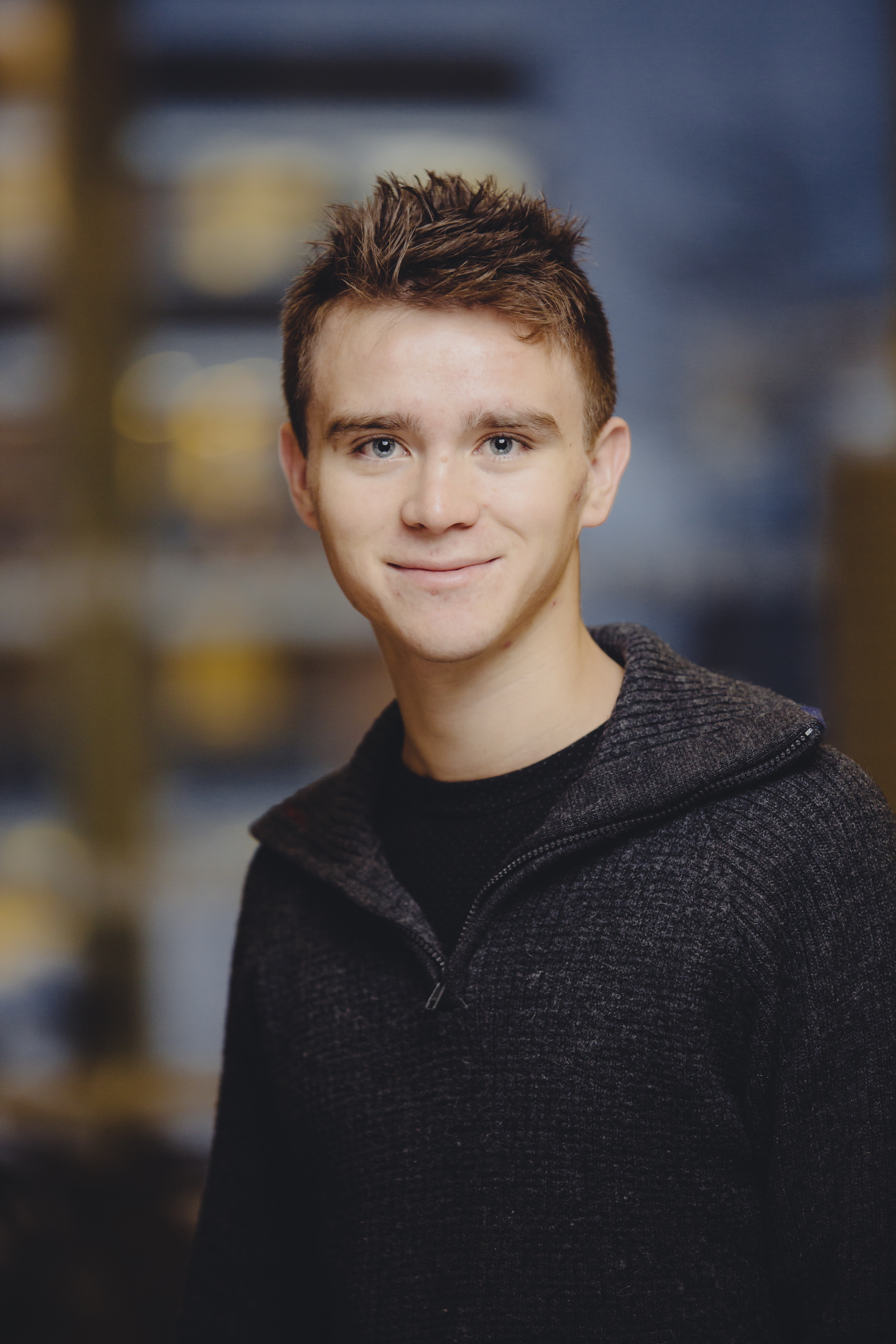
- Notkevich in 2015

Personal information
- Born: 9 February 1993 (age 33) Oslo, Norway

Chess career
- Country: Norway
- Title: Grandmaster (2018)
- FIDE rating: 2453 (July 2026)
- Peak rating: 2512 (March 2019)

Benjamin Arvola Notkevich (born 9 February 1993 in Oslo) is a Norwegian chess grandmaster.

== Chess career ==
He achieved the title International Master in 2017, and was awarded the Grandmaster title in 2018.

Notkevich achieved his first Grandmaster norm in Fagernes in April 2017, with subsequent norms in Fagernes in April 2018 and in the 43rd Chess Olympiad in Batumi in October 2018.
