= Khanim Balajayeva =

Azerbaijani chess player (born 2001)

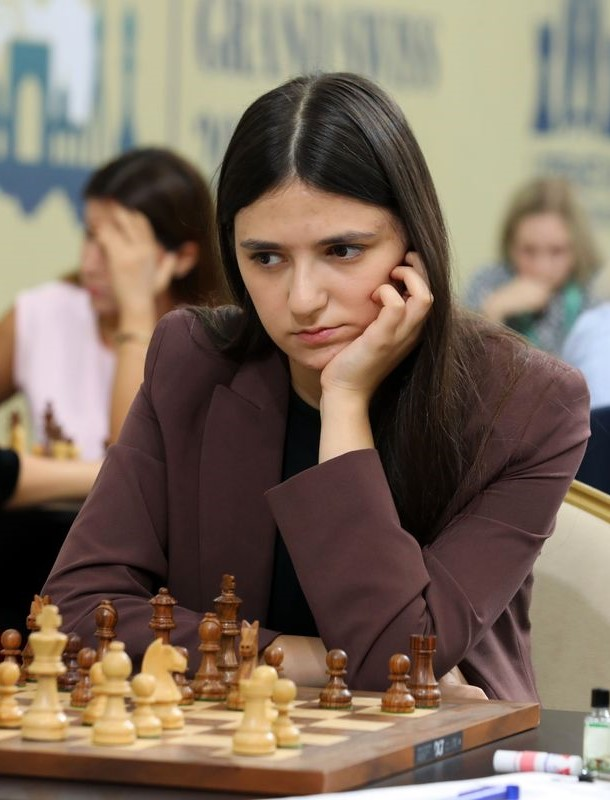
- Balajayeva in 2025

Personal information
- Born: 28 March 2001 (age 25) Qax, Azerbaijan

Chess career
- Country: Azerbaijan
- Title: International Master (2023); Woman Grandmaster (2019)
- Peak rating: 2404 (July 2024)
- Peak ranking: No. 47 woman (July 2024)

Khanim Balajayeva (Azerbaijani: Xanım Balacayeva; born March 28, 2001) is an Azerbaijani chess player. She was awarded the title International Master by FIDE in 2023.

== Career ==
In February 2018, Balajayeva won the Azerbaijani women's championship edging out Gunay Mammadzada on tie-break score. Both players scored 6½ points out of 9.

=== Team competitions ===
At the 42nd Chess Olympiad, which was held in Baku, Azerbaijan, in September 2016, on the rights of the hosts of the tournament, Azerbaijan was represented by three teams. Balajayeva played on board two of the 3rd Azerbaijani team in the women's section. The team finished the tournament on 30th place, while Balajayeva scored 7½ points out of 11 games.

She played on the Azerbaijani team again at the Women's World Team Chess Championship in 2017 in Khanty-Mansiysk, Russia.

At the 43rd Chess Olympiad, which took place in Batumi, Georgia in September–October 2018, Balajayeva represented Azerbaijan in the women's event playing board three and scored 7 points out of 9. Her performance rating was 2522, which earned her the gold medal on board 3. The team finished the tournament on the 10th place.
