= Davit Maghalashvili =

Georgian chess grandmaster (born 1987)

Personal information
- Born: June 27, 1987 (age 39)

Chess career
- Country: Georgia
- Title: Grandmaster (2014)
- FIDE rating: 2436 (July 2026)
- Peak rating: 2524 (November 2015)

Davit Maghalashvili is a Georgian chess grandmaster.

== Chess career ==
He achieved the Grandmaster title in 2014, earning his norms at the:

- Aeroflot Open A2 in February 2005
- ULUSLARARASI 5 in September 2006
- Tbilisi Chess Academy-01 in February 2014
Frick vs. Maghalashvili, Batumi 2018

Position: h1 white king, f1 white rook, d1 white queen, b1 white rook, h2 white pawn, g2 white pawn, f2 white bishop, e2 white bishop, b2 white pawn, f3 white pawn, c3 white knight, a3 white pawn, f4 black bishop, c4 white pawn, b4 black knight, h5 black knight, f5 black pawn, e5 black pawn, d5 white pawn, a5 black pawn, h6 black queen, d6 black pawn, h7 black pawn, g7 black pawn, b7 black pawn, g8 black king, f8 black rook, a8 black rook

After 21...Bxh2!! White resigned, as 22.Kxh2 Ng3+ 23.Kxg3 f4+ 24.Kg4 Rf5!! 25.Bh4 Rh5 26.Qe1 Nc2 27.Qf2 Ne3+ wins.

In September 2018, he played for the Georgia B team in the 43rd Chess Olympiad. In the first round, he was awarded the best game prize for his game against Renato Frick of Liechtenstein.

In June 2020, he placed 2nd-6th in the 1st Mukhtar Ismagambetov Memorial along with Nodirbek Abdusattorov, Dmitriy Bocharov, Kazybek Nogerbek, and Shakhriyar Mamedyarov, with a score of 8.5/11.
