= Siranush Ghukasyan =

Armenian chess player (born 1998)

Personal information
- Born: 25 November 1998 (age 27) Yerevan, Armenia

Chess career
- Country: Armenia
- Title: Woman International Master (2017)
- Peak rating: 2261 (September 2019)

Siranush Ghukasyan (Armenian: Սիրանուշ Ղուկասյան; born 25 November 1998) is an Armenian chess player who holds the FIDE title of Woman International Master (WIM, 2017). She is a three-time Armenian Women's Chess Championship medalist (2017, 2018, 2019).

== Biography ==
Ghukasyan won Armenian Youth Chess Championship in various girl's age groups: 2008 (U10), 2010 (U12), 2012 (U14), 2014 (U16). In 2013, she also won silver medal in U16 age group. Siranush Ghukasyan participated in European Youth Chess Championships and World Youth Chess Championships. She won medals in Armenian Women's Chess Championship: 2 silver (2017, 2018) and bronze (2019).

She played for Armenia in the Women's Chess Olympiad:

- In 2018, at reserve board in the 43rd Chess Olympiad (women) in Batumi (+2, =4, -0).

Ghukasyan played for Armenia in the World Women's Team Chess Championship:

- In 2019, at reserve board in the 7th Women's World Team Chess Championship in Astana (+1, =0, -4).

She played for Armenia in the European Women's Team Chess Championships:

- In 2019, at second board in the 22nd European Team Chess Championship (women) in Batumi (+1, =1, -3);
- In 2021, at reserve board in the 23rd European Team Chess Championship (women) in Čatež ob Savi (+1, =4, -2).

In 2017, Ghukasyan received the FIDE Woman International Master (WIM) title.
