= Miranda Mikadze =

Georgian chess player (born 1989)

Personal information
- Born: 18 September 1989 (age 36) Batumi, Georgian SSR, Soviet Union

Chess career
- Country: Georgia
- Title: Woman Grandmaster (2016)
- FIDE rating: 2237 (April 2021)
- Peak rating: 2375 (September 2010)

Miranda Mikadze (Georgian: მირანდა მიქაძე; born 18 September 1989) is a Georgian chess player who holds the FIDE title of Woman Grandmaster (WGM, 2016).

== Biography ==
Miranda Mikadze represented Georgia at the European Youth Chess Championships and World Youth Chess Championships, where she won two silver medals: in 2003 in Budva, at the European Youth Chess Championship in the U14 girls age group (behind Anna Muzychuk), and in 2005 in Belfort, at the World Youth Chess Championship in the U16 girls age group (also behind Anna Muzychuk).

She is a multiple-time Georgian Women's Chess Championship participant with the best results in 2010 and 2019, when she finished in 4th place.

Mikadze played for Georgia-2 team in the European Women's Team Chess Championship:

- In 2019, at reserve board in the 22nd European Team Chess Championship (women) in Batumi (+1, =3, -1).

She played for Georgia-2 team in the Women's Chess Olympiad:

- In 2018, at reserve board in the 43rd Chess Olympiad (women) in Batumi (+4, =1, -1).

Mikadze played for Batumi chess club Nona in European Women's Chess Club Cup (2014-2016) and won two gold medal in team competition (2014, 2015).

In 2007, she received the FIDE Woman International Master (WIM) title. In 2016, she was awarded the FIDE Woman Grandmaster (WGM) title.
