= Marina Brunello =

Italian chess player (born 1994)

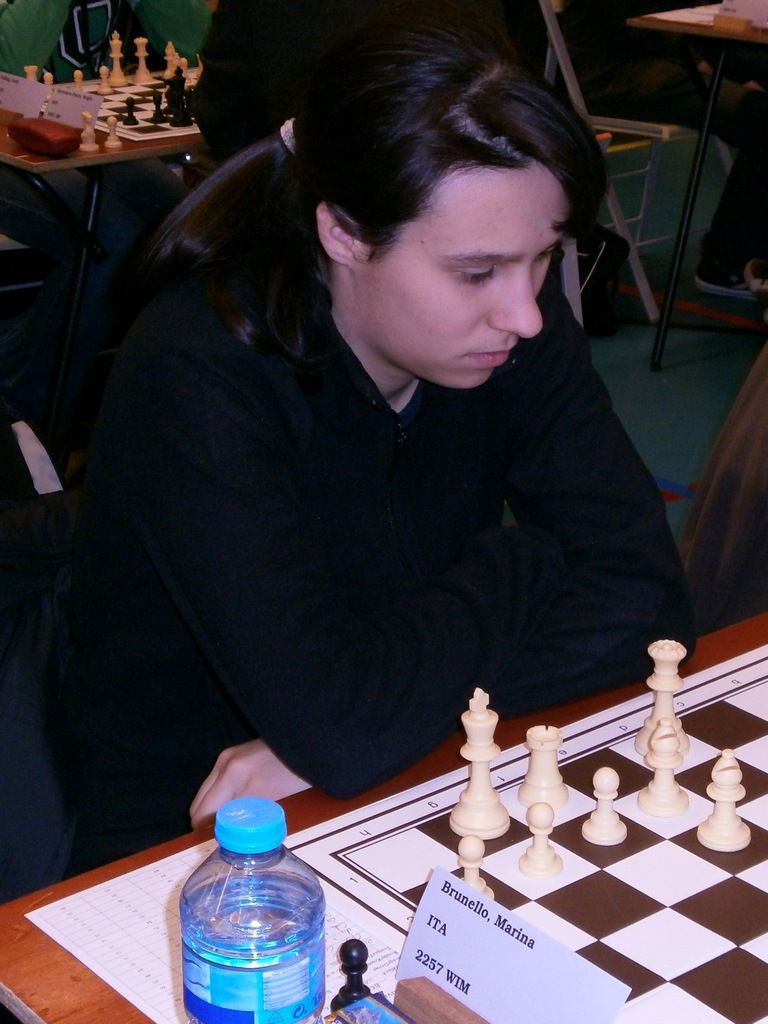
- Marina Brunello in 2012

Personal information
- Born: 16 June 1994 (age 32) Lovere, Italy

Chess career
- Country: Italy
- Title: International Master (2019); Woman Grandmaster (2016)
- Peak rating: 2400 (August 2019)

Marina Brunello (born 16 June 1994) is an Italian chess player. She holds the titles of International Master and Woman Grandmaster.

== Chess career ==
In 2008, in Bratto, Brunello won the Italian women's chess championship, becoming the youngest ever to do so at the age of 14 years, 2 months and 15 days. In 2011 she finished third in the women's round-robin tournament (won by Sopiko Guramishvili) held alongside the Torneo di Capodanno ("New Year’s Tournament") in Reggio Emilia. Brunello won the Italian women's championship for the second time in 2018, after beating Olga Zimina in a playoff.

Marina Brunello played for Italy in the Women's Chess Olympiad:

- In 2006, at first reserve board (Italy 2) in the 37th Chess Olympiad (women) in Turin (+1, =3, -4),
- In 2008, at fourth board in the 38th Chess Olympiad (women) in Dresden (+3, =2, -3),
- In 2010, at third board in the 39th Chess Olympiad (women) in Khanty-Mansiysk (+2, =6, -3),
- In 2012, at third board in the 40th Chess Olympiad (women) in Istanbul (+6, =2, -2),
- In 2014, at second board in the 41st Chess Olympiad (women) in Tromsø (+5, =2, -3),
- In 2016, at second board in the 42nd Chess Olympiad (women) in Baku (+6, =4, -1).

She won the individual gold medal on board four at the Women's Olympiad of 2018 in Batumi.

Brunello played for Italy in the European Team Chess Championship:

- In 2009, at third board in the 8th European Team Chess Championship (women) in Novi Sad (+2, =5, -1),
- In 2011, at third board in the 9th European Team Chess Championship (women) in Porto Carras (+5, =2, -2),
- In 2013, at third board in the 10th European Team Chess Championship (women) in Warsaw (+5, =2, -2),
- In 2015, at third board in the 11th European Team Chess Championship (women) in Reykjavík and won individual bronze medal (+5, =3, -1).

In 2010, she was awarded the title of Woman International Master (WIM) by FIDE and received that of FIDE Master (FM) four years later. In 2016, Brunello was awarded the title of Woman Grandmaster (WGM), which was followed by that of International Master (IM) three years later.

== Personal life ==
Her brother Sabino Brunello is also a chess player.
