= Inga Charkhalashvili =

Georgian chess player (born 1983)

Personal information
- Born: 23 April 1983 (age 43) Kutaisi, Georgian SSR, Soviet Union

Chess career
- Country: Georgia
- Title: Woman Grandmaster (2005)
- Peak rating: 2379 (June 2016)

Inga Charkhalashvili (Georgian: ინგა ჭარხალაშვილი; born 23 April 1983) is a Georgian Woman Grandmaster (WGM) (2005). She is a winner of Georgian Women's Chess Championship (1999).

== Biography ==
From 1993 to 2002, Inga Charkhalashvili represented Georgia at the European Youth Chess Championships and World Youth Chess Championships, where she won four medals: gold (in 2001, at the European Youth Chess Championship in the U18 girls age group), silver (in 2002, at the European Youth chess championship in the U20 girls age group) and two bronzes (in 1998 and 1999, at the World Youth Chess Championship in the U16 girls age group).

In 1999, she won Georgian Women's Chess Championship.

Inga Charkhalashvili played for Georgia-3 team in the European Team Chess Championship:

- In 1999, at first reserve board in the 3rd European Team Chess Championship (women) in Batumi (+3, =2, -0) and won individual gold medal.

Inga Charkhalashvili played for Georgia-2 team in the Women's Chess Olympiads:

- In 2018, at second board in the 43rd Chess Olympiad (women) in Batumi (+5, =4, -1).

In 2012, in Warsaw Inga Charkhalashvili won Krystyna Radzikowska memorial chess tournament.

In 2005, she was awarded the FIDE International Grandmaster (WGM) title.
