= Julianna Terbe =

Hungarian chess player

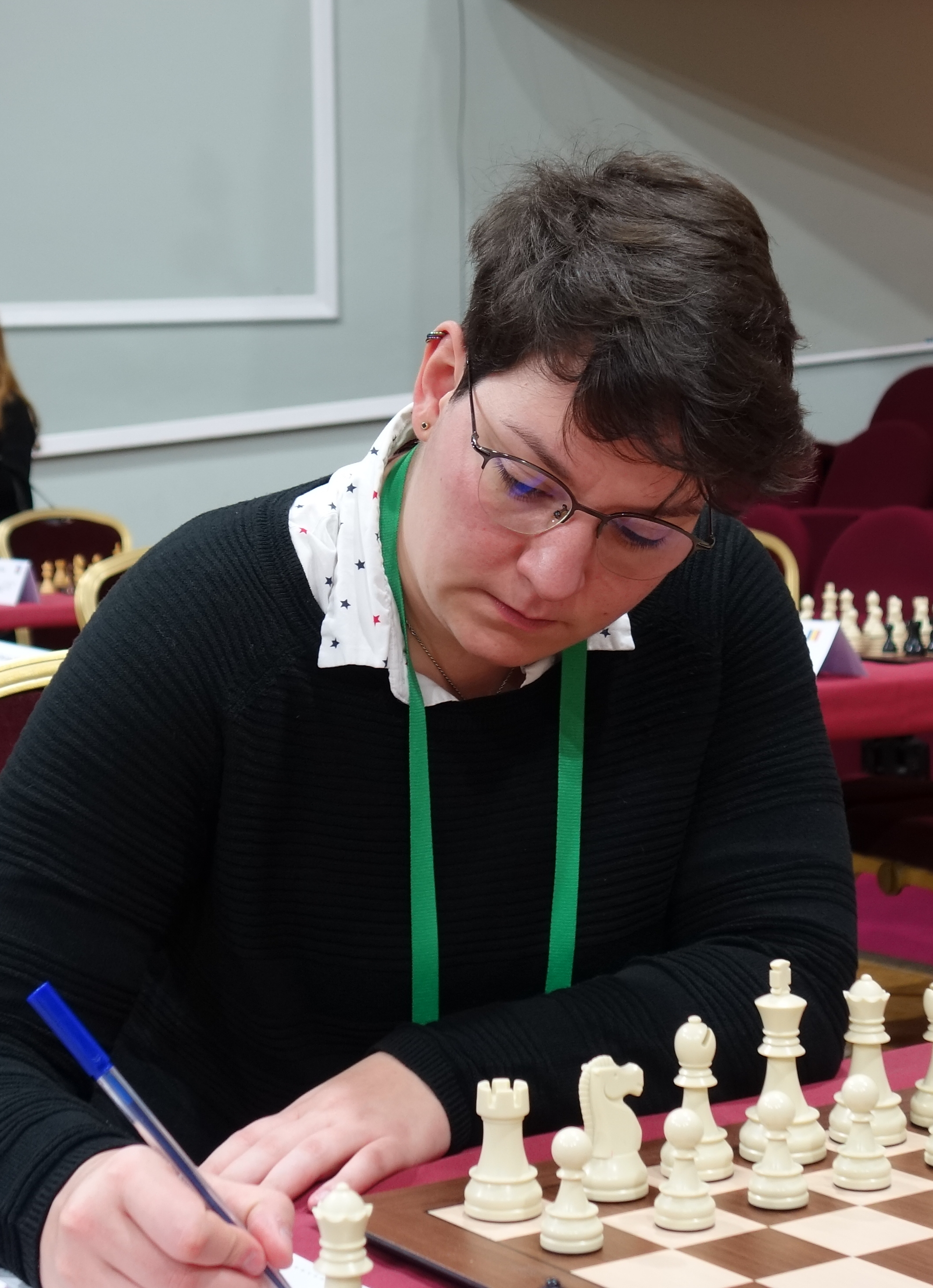
- Terbe in 2023

Personal information
- Born: 8 January 1997 (age 29) Karcag, Hungary

Chess career
- Country: Hungary
- Title: Woman International Master (2017)
- Peak rating: 2318 (November 2021)

Julianna Terbe (born 8 January 1997) is a Hungarian chess player. She qualified for the FIDE title of Woman International Master (WIM) in 2017.

== Biography ==
She played for Hungary in the Women's Chess Olympiad:

- In 2018, at reserve board in the 43rd Chess Olympiad (women) in Batumi (+4, =3, -1).

Terbe played for Hungary in the World Women's Team Chess Championships:

- In 2019, at fourth board in the 7th Women's World Team Chess Championship in Astana (+1, =0, -5).

She played for Hungary in the European Women's Team Chess Championship:

- In 2019, at reserve board in the 22nd European Team Chess Championship (women) in Batumi (+1, =0, -2).

In 2019, Julianna Terbe ranked 3rd in one of First Saturday International Chess Tournament in Budapest. and won International Chess Tournament in Corralejo.

== FIDE ratings ==
Elo development
View chart definition.
