= Kamil Dragun =

Polish chess grandmaster (born 1995)

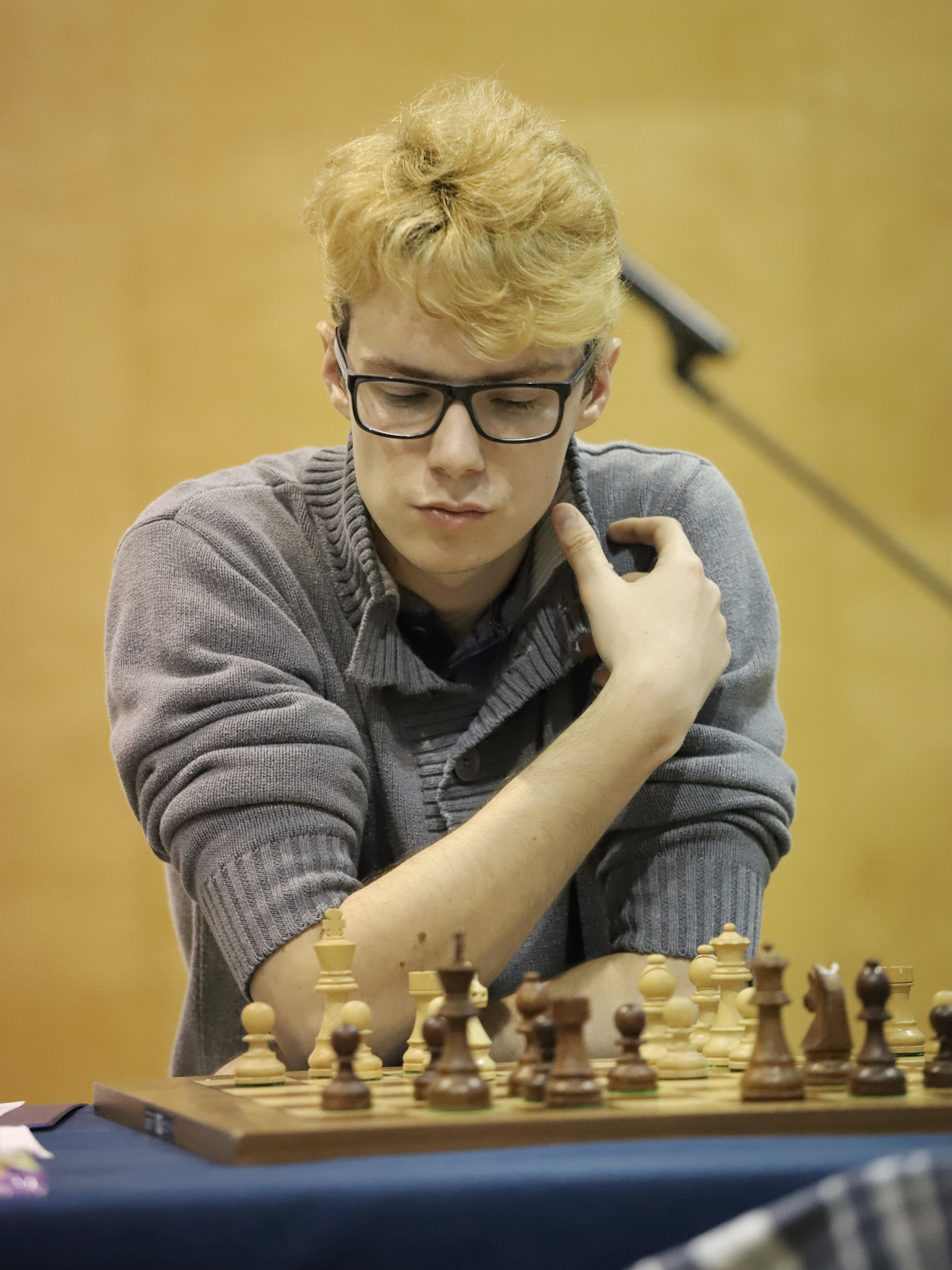
- Dragun in 2019

Personal information
- Born: 25 June 1995 (age 31) Gorzów Wielkopolski, Poland

Chess career
- Country: Poland
- Title: Grandmaster (2013)
- FIDE rating: 2512 (July 2026)
- Peak rating: 2625 (August 2017)

Kamil Dragun (born 25 June 1995) is a Polish chess grandmaster.

== Chess career ==
Dragun won medals in the Polish Junior Chess Championship in different age categories. In 2009 he won European Youth Chess Championship (U14) in Fermo, Italy. In 2010 Dragun won World Youth Chess Championship (U16) in Chalkidiki, Greece. He became a FIDE master in 2009 and an International Master in 2010. Dragun has also competed successfully in Polish Team Chess Championships (individual gold in 2011, 2013).

Dragun played for Poland in the European Boys' U18 Team Chess Championship:

- In 2010, won team and individual gold at third board in the 10th European U18 Team Chess Championship (boys) in Pardubice (+3, =4, -0),
- In 2012, won team and individual gold at first board in the 12th European U18 Team Chess Championship (boys) in Pardubice (+6, =2, -1),
- In 2013, won team and individual gold at first board in the 13th European U18 Team Chess Championship (boys) in Maribor (+7, =0, -0).

Dragun played for Poland in the European Team Chess Championship:

- In 2013, at second board (Poland 2) in the 19th European Team Chess Championship in Warsaw (+2, =3, -4).

He shared first place with Bai Jinshi at the London Chess Classic Open in 2014, scoring 7½/9 points.

Dragun is the 11th highest rated Polish player.

In November 2020, he tied for first place with strong IM Praveen Balakrishnan in the Charlotte Chess Center's Thanksgiving 2020 GM Norm Invitational held in Charlotte, North Carolina with an undefeated score of 6.5/9.

Currently Dragun is mainly coaching, https://austin-chess.com/individual_lessons/8/
