= Sopio Gvetadze =

Georgian chess player (born 1983)

Personal information
- Born: November 15, 1983 (age 42) Tbilisi, Georgia

Chess career
- Country: Georgia
- Title: International Master (2007)
- Peak rating: 2416 (January 2007)

Sopio Gvetadze (Georgian: სოფიო გვეტაძე; born November 15, 1983, in Tbilisi) is a Georgian chess player who holds the title of an international master and a woman grandmaster.

She qualified for the Women's World Chess Championship 2017, where she lost to Nino Batsiashvili.
