= Jacek Tomczak (chess player) =

Polish chess grandmaster (born 1990)

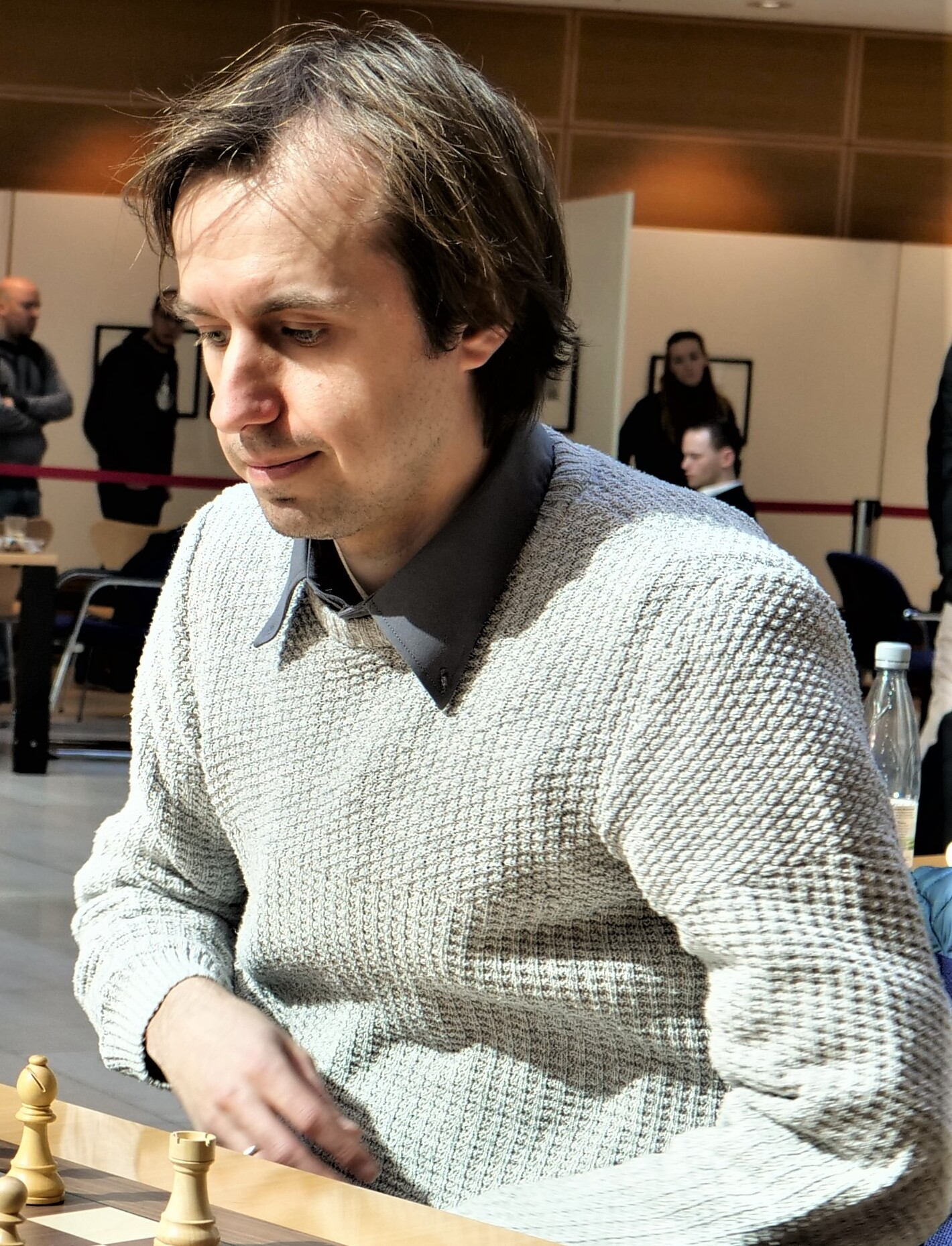
- Tomczak in 2023

Personal information
- Born: 5 March 1990 (age 36) Śrem, Poland

Chess career
- Country: Poland
- Title: Grandmaster (2012)
- FIDE rating: 2545 (August 2026)
- Peak rating: 2635 (March 2019)

Jacek Tomczak (born 5 March 1990) is a Polish chess Grandmaster (2012).

== Chess career ==
Tomczak became interested in chess at the age of six. He won medals in the Polish Junior Chess Championship in different age categories. In 2006 Tomczak won World Youth Chess Championship (U16) in Batumi (Georgia). In 2007 he made his debut in the Polish Chess Championship final in Opole where he took 12th place. Tomczak has also competed successfully in several Polish Team Chess Championships (individual gold and team bronze in 2014, individual bronze in 2011). Tomczak played for Poland in 2013 Summer Universiade and won bronze in the mixed team competition.

In May 2024, in Rzeszów he won silver medal in Polish Chess Championship.

Tomczak played for Poland in European Boys' U18 Team Chess Championship:

- In 2008, won team gold at first board in the 8th European U18 Team Chess Championship (boys) in Szeged (+1, =5, -1).

Tomczak played for Poland in European Team Chess Championship:

- In 2013, at third board (Poland 2) in the 19th European Team Chess Championship in Warsaw (+1, =5, -3).
