= Chess scoring =

System of points scoring in the game of chess

In chess, by far the most common scoring system is 1 point for a win, ½ for a draw, and 0 for a loss.

A number of different notations are used to denote a player's score in a match or tournament, or their long-term record against a particular opponent. The most common are:

Format	Meaning	Example
A/B	Points scored (A) out of games played (B)	"... Fabiano Caruana, is second, with 7.5/11."
A–B	Points for (A) – points against (B)	"Fischer won the tournament... with a score of 18½–4½". The games played is the sum of the "for" and "against" scores, so in this case, Fischer scored 18½ points from 23 games played.
+W −L =D	W wins, L losses, D draws	"Fischer 6.5/9 (+5 −1 =3)", meaning Fischer scored 5 wins, 1 loss and 3 draws for a total of 6.5 points out of 9.
+A or −A	Number of wins minus number of losses	"Fabiano came into the final round on an unbeaten +4". This refers to Caruana scoring 7 points in the first 10 rounds of the FIDE Grand Swiss Tournament 2021, which meant 3 points were scored against him, and 7 minus 3 is equal to +4.

== Less common systems ==
- Occasionally, in a match between two players in which draws do not count, the number of draws may be omitted, or mentioned separately. For instance, the World Chess Championship 1978 was won by Anatoly Karpov by a score of 6 wins to 5, with draws not counting. The match score is usually given as "6–5", or "6–5 with 21 draws".
- Sometimes a Three points for a win system is used: 3 points for a win, 1 for a draw and 0 for a loss. This is usually shown as the number of points from number of games played, for instance "10 points from 6 games" for 3 wins, 2 losses and 1 draw.

== See also ==
- Chess piece relative value
