= Bulgarian Chess Federation =

Chess governing organisation, Bulgaria

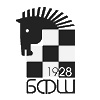
Logo of the Bulgarian Chess Federation

The Bulgarian Chess Federation (Bulgarian: Българска федерация по шахмат, abbreviated БФШ/BCF) is the former governing chess organisation in Bulgaria and the one that was a member of FIDE and ECU until 2016. BCF was formed in 2001 and was effectively a re-constitution of the extant governing body, the Bulgarian Chess Union, an organisation founded in 1928 and registered in 1931.

== Activities ==
The Bulgarian Chess Federation organizes the official national individual and team championships in all categories (including Bulgarian Youth Championships), as well as determines the national chess teams of Bulgaria, license and educates coaches and chess arbiters, and others. Officials of the BCF are elected every 4 years by all active chess clubs in Bulgaria, the elected officials may serve unlimited terms. The post of President in the last elections in 2014 was filled again by Silvio Danailov, who was then also serves as the president of the European Chess Union.

In 2016 it was expelled from the European Chess Union, and Silvio Danailov was removed from a leadership position in the ECU.

Since the summer of 2017, the newly established Bulgarian Chess Federation 1928 has been formally managing chess in Bulgaria, and since 2018 it has also officially represented it internationally as a full member of FIDE.

== See also ==
- Bulgarian Chess Championship
- Bulgarian Chess Federation 1928
