= Women's Chess World Cup 2025 =

Chess tournament in Batumi, Georgia

FIDE Women's Chess World Cup 2025
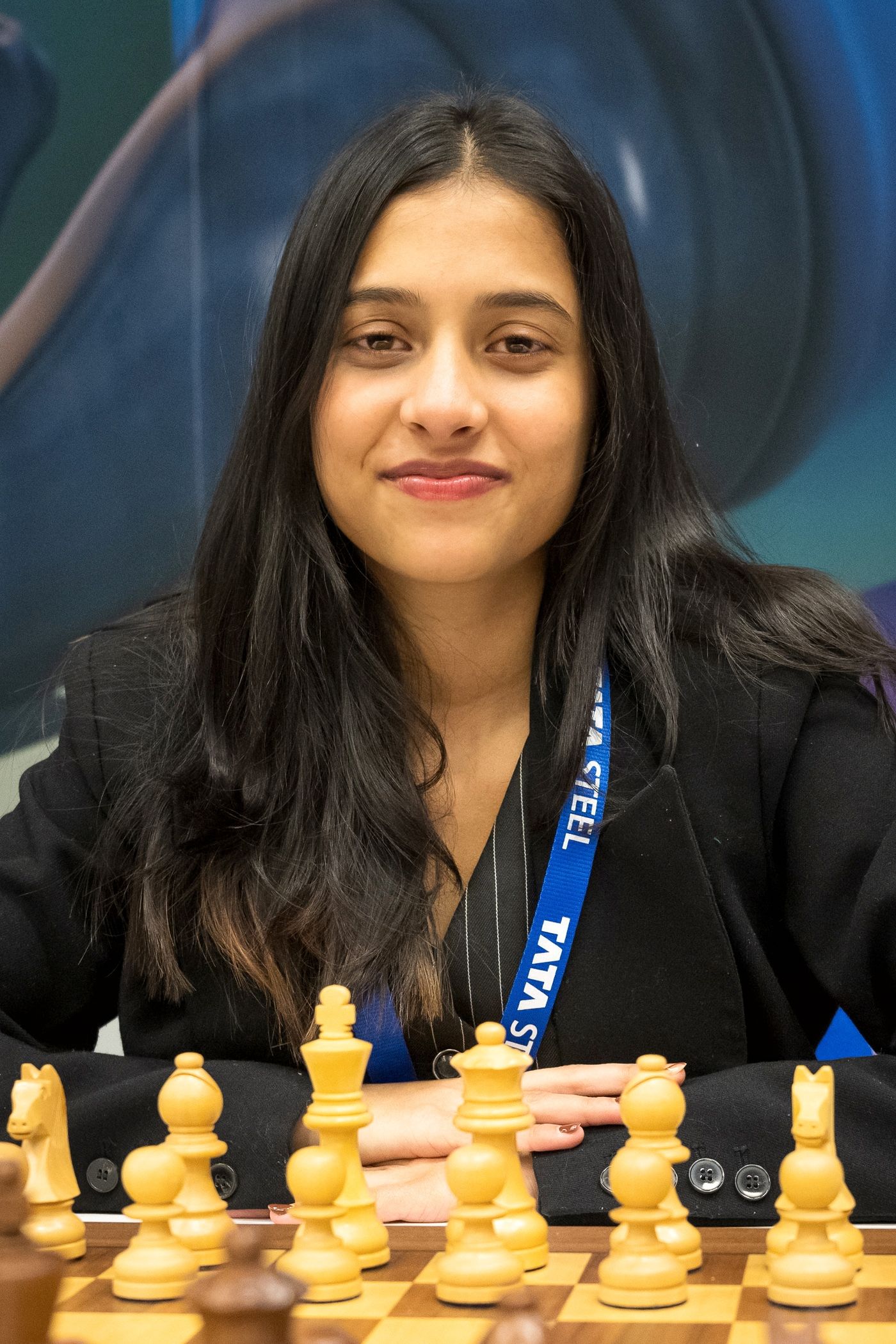
- Divya Deshmukh, the winner of the 2025 FIDE Women's World Cup.

Tournament information
- Sport: Chess
- Location: Batumi, Georgia
- Dates: 5–29 July 2025
- Administrator: FIDE
- Tournament format: Single-elimination tournament
- Host: Georgian Chess Federation

Final positions
- Champion: (India) Divya Deshmukh
- Runner-up: (India) Koneru Humpy
- 3rd place: (China) Tan Zhongyi

The Women's Chess World Cup 2025 was a 107-player single-elimination chess tournament that took place in Batumi, Georgia from 5 July to 29 July 2025. It was the third edition of the Women's Chess World Cup. The winner Divya Deshmukh, runner-up Koneru Humpy, and third-place finisher Tan Zhongyi qualified for the Women's Candidates Tournament 2026. Deshmukh, who previously held the title of International Master, became eligible for the Grandmaster title as a result of the tournament victory.

Unlike previous editions, the tournament was not held in parallel with the open Chess World Cup 2025.

== Format ==
The tournament was a 7-round knockout event, with the top 21 seeds given a bye directly into the second round. The losers of the two semi-finals played a match for third place. The top 3 finishers qualified for the Women's Candidates Tournament 2026.

Each round consisted of classical time limit games on the first two days, plus tie-breaks on the third day if required. The time limits were as follows:

- Two classical time limit games: 90 minutes, plus a 30-second increment per move from move 1, plus a 30-minute increment on move 40.
- If the match is tied after the classical games, players will play two rapid chess games, with 15 minutes plus a 10-second increment per move.
- If the match is still tied, they will then play two more rapid chess games, with 10 minutes plus a 10-second increment per move.
- If the match is still tied, they will then play two blitz games, with 5 minutes plus a 3-second increment per move.
- If the match is still tied, a single blitz game, with 3 minutes plus a 2-second increment per move, will be played to decide the match. A drawing of lots will determine which player plays white. If drawn, the players will switch colors and play again, until a decisive result is obtained.

=== Schedule ===
Each round lasted three days: two for classical time limit games and a third, if necessary, for tie-breaks. Rounds 1 to 3 ran from July 6 to 14; July 15 was a rest day; Rounds 4 to 6 ran from July 16 to 24; July 25 was a rest day; and the final and third-place matches ran from July 26 to 28.

=== Prize money ===
The total prize fund was US$691,250, with the first prize of US$50,000.

Prize money in US dollars
Ranking	Prizes	Total
Eliminated in Round 1	43 × 3,750	161,250
Eliminated in Round 2	32 × 5,000	160,000
Eliminated in Round 3	16 × 6,750	108,000
Eliminated in Round 4	8 × 9,500	76,000
Eliminated in Round 5	4 × 14,000	56,000
4th place	1 × 20,000	20,000
3rd place	1 × 25,000	25,000
Runner-up	1 × 35,000	35,000
Winner	1 × 50,000	50,000
Total		691,250

== Participants ==
The participants are seeded here by their FIDE rating as of June 2025.

1. Lei Tingjie (CHN), GM, 2552 (R)
2. Zhu Jiner (CHN), GM, 2547 (R)
3. Tan Zhongyi (CHN), GM, 2546 (WWC)
4. Humpy Koneru (IND), GM, 2543 (R)
5. Anna Muzychuk (UKR), GM, 2535 (WWC)
6. Aleksandra Goryachkina (FIDE), GM, 2533 (WWC)
7. Kateryna Lagno (FIDE), GM, 2515 (Z3.8) (Note: Russian players' flags are displayed as the FIDE flag, as Russian and Belarusian flags are banned from FIDE-rated events in response to the Russian invasion of Ukraine.)
8. Nana Dzagnidze (GEO), GM, 2505 (R)
9. Mariya Muzychuk (UKR), GM, 2492 (R)
10. Harika Dronavalli (IND), GM, 2483 (FN)
11. Vaishali Rameshbabu (IND), GM, 2481 (R)
12. Polina Shuvalova (FIDE), IM, 2480 (Z3.8)
13. Alexandra Kosteniuk (SUI), GM, 2474 (FN)
14. Yuliia Osmak (UKR), IM, 2468 (E24)
15. Divya Deshmukh (IND), IM, 2463 (U20)
16. Nino Batsiashvili (GEO), GM, 2462 (E24)
17. Alina Kashlinskaya (POL), IM, 2459 (FN)
18. Teodora Injac (SRB), IM, 2457 (E25)
19. Lu Miaoyi (CHN), IM, 2452 (FN)
20. Meri Arabidze (GEO), IM, 2440 (C)
21. Lela Javakhishvili (GEO), IM, 2432 (E24)
22. Carissa Yip (USA), IM, 2431 (Z2.1)
23. Stavroula Tsolakidou (GRE), IM, 2428 (E24)
24. Bella Khotenashvili (GEO), GM, 2418 (E25)
25. Valentina Gunina (FIDE), GM, 2416 (C)
26. Anna Ushenina (UKR), GM, 2413 (E25)
27. Anna Shukhman (FIDE), WGM, 2413 (PN)
28. Song Yuxin (CHN), IM, 2410 (AS25)
29. Klaudia Kulon (POL), IM, 2407 (E25)
30. Deimantė Cornette (FRA), IM, 2404 (E25)
31. Aleksandra Maltsevskaya (POL), IM, 2403 (E25)
32. Elina Danielian (ARM), GM, 2403 (FN)
33. Antoaneta Stefanova (BUL), GM, 2399 (FN)
34. Lilit Mkrtchian (ARM), IM, 2396 (E24)
35. Irina Bulmaga (ROU), IM, 2393 (E24)
36. Zsoka Gaal (HUN), WGM, 2391 (FN)
37. Mai Narva (EST), IM, 2391 (E25)
38. Alice Lee (USA), IM, 2389 (Z2.1)
39. Vantika Agrawal (IND), IM, 2388 (PN)
40. Govhar Beydullayeva (AZE), WGM, 2386 (E24)
41. Nurgyul Salimova (BUL), IM, 2385 (WWC)
42. Zhai Mo (CHN), WGM, 2379 (Z3.5)
43. Irina Krush (USA), GM, 2376 (FN)
44. Ulviyya Fataliyeva (AZE), IM, 2372 (E24)
45. Marsel Efroimski (ISR), IM, 2372 (FN)
46. Gulrukhbegim Tokhirjonova (UZB), IM, 2370 (PN)
47. Oliwia Kiolbasa (POL), IM, 2366 (E25)
48. Sophie Milliet (FRA), IM, 2360 (E25)
49. Khanim Balajayeva (AZE), IM, 2358 (FN)
50. Pham Le Thao Nguyen (VIE), IM, 2357 (FN)
51. Deysi Cori (PER), IM, 2354 (Z2.4)
52. Padmini Rout (IND), IM, 2352 (Z3.7)
53. Gulnar Mammadova (AZE), IM, 2352 (E25)
54. Maili-Jade Ouellet (CAN), WGM, 2350 (Z2.2)
55. P. V. Nandhidhaa (IND), WGM, 2343 (Z3.7)
56. Bat-Erdene Mungunzul (MGL), WCM, 2337 (AS25)
57. Pauline Guichard (FRA), IM, 2332 (FN)
58. Nadya Toncheva (BUL), FM, 2332 (E24)
59. Meruert Kamalidenova (KAZ), IM, 2330 (Z3.5)
60. Inna Gaponenko (UKR), IM, 2327 (FN)
61. Afruza Khamdamova (UZB), WIM, 2326 (Z3.4)
62. Ana Matnadze (ESP), IM, 2325 (FN)
63. Amina Kairbekova (KAZ), WIM, 2317 (FN)
64. Candela Francisco (ARG), WGM, 2316 (AM25)
65. Gao Muziyan (CHN), WIM, 2315 (Z3.5)
66. Mobina Alinasab (IRI), WGM, 2311 (FN)
67. Anastasia Kirtadze (GEO), WFM, 2307 (ON)
68. Fiorella Contreras Huaman (PER), WIM, 2305 (FN)
69. Zala Urh (SLO), WIM, 2304 (E25)
70. Alicja Sliwicka (POL), WGM, 2299 (E24)
71. Anastasia Avramidou (GRE), FM, 2294 (FN)
72. Daria Charochkina (FIDE), IM, 2283 (Z3.8)
73. Thalia Cervantes Landeiro (USA), WGM, 2278 (AM24)
74. Anahi Ortiz Verdezoto (ECU), WIM, 2248 (C)
75. Anapaola Borda Rodas (ARG), WIM, 2247 (Z2.5)
76. Li Yunshan (CAN), WIM, 2230 (FN)
77. Zhang Lanlin (CHN), untitled, 2230 (Z3.5)
78. Wang Chuqiao (CHN), WIM, 2229 (Z3.5)
79. Kesaria Mgeladze (GEO), WFM, 2226 (FN)
80. Elnaz Kaliakhmet (KAZ), WFM, 2218 (Z3.4)
81. Umida Omonova (UZB), WIM, 2211 (FN)
82. Julia Ryjanova (AUS), WGM, 2209 (Z3.6)
83. Yerisbel Miranda Llanes (CUB), WGM, 2205 (Z2.3.2)
84. Shrook Wafa (EGY), WGM, 2203 (AF25)
85. Zhang Jilin (AUS), WGM, 2184 (FN)
86. Alserkal Rouda Essa (UAE), WGM, 2175 (FN)
87. Maria Jose Campos (ARG), WIM, 2174 (FN)
88. Shafira Devi Herfesa (INA), untitled, 2167 (Z3.3)
89. Anahita Zahedifar (IRI), WFM, 2143 (Z3.1)
90. Lala Shohradova (TKM), WFM, 2135 (FN)
91. Devindya Oshini Gunawardhana (SRI), WIM, 2121 (FN)
92. Shahenda Wafa (EGY), WGM, 2093 (FN)
93. Priyanka K (IND), WIM, 2090 (Z3.7)
94. Erdenebayar Khuslen (MGL), WFM, 2081 (FN)
95. Lina Nassr (ALG), WIM, 2054 (AF25)
96. Puteri Munajjah Az-Zahraa Azhar (MAS), WIM, 2032 (FN)
97. Nadezhda Antonova (TJK), WFM, 2030 (FN)
98. Jana Mohamed Zaki (EGY), no title, 2023 (C)
99. Wadifa Ahmed (BAN), WIM, 2023 (Z3.2)
100. Tania Miranda Rodriguez (MEX), WIM, 2007 (Z2.3.1)
101. Kiran Manisha Mohanty (IND), WGM, 2006 (Z3.7)
102. Ruelle Canino (PHI), WFM, 2004 (FN)
103. Jesse February (RSA), WIM, 1989 (AF24)
104. Isabelle Yixuan Ning (NZL), CM, 1984 (FN)
105. Esperanca Caxita (ANG), WIM, 1966 (FN)
106. Evi Yuliana (INA), WFM, 1937 (FN)
107. Hannah Wilson (BAR), WFM, 1934 (Z2.3.3)

The 107 participants who qualified were:

- The Women's World Chess Champion as of 1 June 2025 (WWCC)
- The top four players in the Women's Chess World Cup 2023 (WWC)
- The 2024 World Girls Chess Champion U20 (U20)
- 54 players qualifying from Continental and Zonal events
  - Europe (13+8): including European Women's Chess Championships 2024 (E24, 10), and 2025 (E25, 11)
  - Americas (3+7): including American Continental Women's Chess Championships 2024 (AM24, 1) and 2025 (AM25, 1); Zonals 2024: 2.1 (Z2.1, 2), and 2.2 (Z2.2, 1); Zonals 2025: 2.3.1 (Z2.3.1, 1), 2.3.2 (Z2.3.2, 1), 2.3.3 (Z2.3.3, 1), 2.4 (Z2.4, 1), and 2.5 (Z2.5, 1)
  - Asia (20): including Asian Women's Chess Championships 2025 (AS25, 2); Zonals 2024: 3.7 (Z3.7, 4), and 3.8 (Z3.8, 3); Zonals 2025: 3.1 (Z3.1, 1), 3.2 (Z3.2, 1), 3.3 (Z3.3, 1), 3.4 (Z3.4, 3), 3.5 (Z3.5, 4), and 3.6 (Z3.6, 1)
  - Africa (3): including African Women's Chess Championships 2024 (AF24, 1) and 2025 (AF25, 2)
- The 5 highest-rated female players from the June 2025 FIDE World Rankings (Note: Players who appear inactive at least once in the 6 FIDE rating lists from January to June 2025 are not eligible.) (R)
- 35 federations spots, selected according to the final standings of the 45th Chess Olympiad Main Competition (FN)
- 2 nominees of the FIDE President (PN)
- 1 nominee of the organizer (ON)
- 4 continental spots decided by the respective Continental President (C)

=== Replacements ===
The following are qualified players who declined to play, and their replacements:

- Ju Wenjun (CHN), 2580 (WWCC) → Mariya Muzychuk (UKR), 2492 (R)
- Hou Yifan (CHN), 2633 (R) → Nana Dzagnidze (GEO), 2505 (R)
- Bibisara Assaubayeva (KAZ), 2509 (R) → Vaishali Rameshbabu (IND), 2481 (R)
- Atousa Pourkashiyan (USA), 2291 (AM24) → Thalia Cervantes Landeiro (USA), 2278 (AM24)
- Nataliya Buksa (UKR), 2400 (E24) → Yuliia Osmak (UKR), 2468 (E24)
- Sarasadat Khademalsharieh (ESP), 2449 (FN) → Ana Matnadze (ESP), 2325 (FN)
- (HKG) (FN) → Anna Shukhman (RUS), 2413 (PN)

== Pairings ==
=== Rounds 1–4 ===
==== Section 1 ====
First round
1	T Lei (CHN)
-	Bye 1
65	M Gao (CHN)	½
64	C Francisco (ARG)	1½
33	A Stefanova (BUL)	2
96	PMAA Azhar (MAS)	0
97	N Antonova (TJK)	0
32	E Danielian (ARM)	2
17	A Kashlinskaya (POL)
-	Bye 17
81	U Omonova (UZB)	3½
48	S Milliet (FRA)	2½
49	K Balajayeva (AZE)	½
80	E Kaliakhmet (KAZ)	1½
-	Bye 16
16	N Batsiashvili (GEO)

Second round
1	T Lei (CHN)	2
64	C Francisco (ARG)	0
33	A Stefanova (BUL)	3½
32	E Danielian (ARM)	2½
17	A Kashlinskaya (POL)	1
81	U Omonova (UZB)	3
80	E Kaliakhmet (KAZ)	1½
16	N Batsiashvili (GEO)	½

Third round
1	T Lei (CHN)	2
33	A Stefanova (BUL)	0
81	U Omonova (UZB)	1½
80	E Kaliakhmet (KAZ)	½

Fourth round
1	T Lei (CHN)	1½
81	U Omonova (UZB)	½

==== Section 2 ====
First round
9	M Muzychuk (UKR)
-	Bye 9
73	T Cervantes Landeiro (USA)	2½
56	B-E Mungunzul (MGL)	1½
41	N Salimova (BUL)	2
88	SD Herfesa (INA)	0
105	E Caxita (ANG)	0
24	B Khotenashvili (GEO)	2
25	V Gunina (FIDE)	1½
104	IY Ning (NZL)	½
89	A Zahedifar (IRI)	4½
40	G Beydullayeva (AZE)	3½
57	P Guichard (FRA)	½
72	D Charochkina (FIDE)	1½
-	Bye 8
8	N Dzagnidze (GEO)

Second round
9	M Muzychuk (UKR)	4
73	T Cervantes Landeiro (USA)	2
41	N Salimova (BUL)	½
24	B Khotenashvili (GEO)	1½
25	V Gunina (FIDE)	2
89	A Zahedifar (IRI)	0
72	D Charochkina (FIDE)	0
8	N Dzagnidze (GEO)	2

Third round
9	M Muzychuk (UKR)	2
24	B Khotenashvili (GEO)	0
25	V Gunina (FIDE)	2
8	N Dzagnidze (GEO)	4

Fourth round
9	M Muzychuk (UKR)	½
8	N Dzagnidze (GEO)	1½

==== Section 3 ====
First round
5	A Muzychuk (UKR)
-	Bye 5
69	Z Urh (SLO)	1½
60	I Gaponenko (UKR)	2½
37	M Narva (EST)	1½
92	S Wafa (EGY)	½
101	KM Mohanty (IND)	½
28	Y Song (CHN)	1½
21	L Javakhishvili (GEO)
-	Bye 21
85	J Zhang (AUS)	½
44	U Fataliyeva (AZE)	1½
53	G Mammadova (AZE)	2½
76	Y Li (CAN)	1½
-	Bye 12
12	P Shuvalova (FIDE)

Second round
5	A Muzychuk (UKR)	2½
60	I Gaponenko (UKR)	1½
37	M Narva (EST)	1
28	Y Song (CHN)	3
21	L Javakhishvili (GEO)	1½
44	U Fataliyeva (AZE)	½
53	G Mammadova (AZE)	0
12	P Shuvalova (FIDE)	2

Third round
5	A Muzychuk (UKR)	2½
28	Y Song (CHN)	3½
21	L Javakhishvili (GEO)	1½
12	P Shuvalova (FIDE)	½

Fourth round
28	Y Song (CHN)	1½
21	L Javakhishvili (GEO)	½

==== Section 4 ====
First round
13	A Kosteniuk (SUI)
-	Bye 13
77	L Zhang (CHN)	0
52	P Rout (IND)	2
45	M Efroimski (ISR)	1½
84	S Wafa (EGY)	½
-	Bye 20
20	M Arabidze (GEO)
29	K Kulon (POL)	3
100	T Miranda Rodriguez (MEX)	1
93	Priyanka K (IND)	5
36	Z Gaal (HUN)	3
61	A Khamdamova (UZB)	2
68	F Contreras Huaman (PER)	0
-	Bye 4
4	H Koneru (IND)

Second round
13	A Kosteniuk (SUI)	4½
52	P Rout (IND)	3½
45	M Efroimski (ISR)	½
20	M Arabidze (GEO)	1½
29	K Kulon (POL)	3
93	Priyanka K (IND)	1
61	A Khamdamova (UZB)	½
4	H Koneru (IND)	1½

Third round
13	A Kosteniuk (SUI)	2½
20	M Arabidze (GEO)	1½
29	K Kulon (POL)	½
4	H Koneru (IND)	1½

Fourth round
13	A Kosteniuk (SUI)	1½
4	H Koneru (IND)	2½

==== Section 5 ====
First round
3	Z Tan (CHN)
-	Bye 3
67	A Kirtadze (GEO)	3
62	A Matnadze (ESP)	1
35	I Bulmaga (ROU)	2
94	E Khulsen (MGL)	0
99	W Ahmed (BAN)	0
30	D Cornette (FRA)	2
19	M Lu (CHN)
-	Bye 19
83	Y Miranda Llanes (CUB)	0
46	G Tokhirjonova (UZB)	2
51	D Cori (PER)	½
78	C Wang (CHN)	1½
-	Bye 14
14	Y Osmak (UKR)

Second round
3	Z Tan (CHN)	2
67	A Kirtadze (GEO)	0
35	I Bulmaga (ROU)	1½
30	D Cornette (FRA)	½
19	M Lu (CHN)	3½
46	G Tokhirjonova (UZB)	2½
78	C Wang (CHN)	0
14	Y Osmak (UKR)	2

Third round
3	Z Tan (CHN)	1½
35	I Bulmaga (ROU)	½
19	M Lu (CHN)	½
14	Y Osmak (UKR)	1½

Fourth round
3	Z Tan (CHN)	1½
14	Y Osmak (UKR)	½

==== Section 6 ====
First round
11	R Vaishali (IND)
-	Bye 11
75	AB Rodas (ARG)	1
54	M-J Ouellet (CAN)	3
43	I Krush (USA)	1½
86	AR Essa (UAE)	½
107	H Wilson (BAR)	0
22	C Yip (USA)	2
27	A Shukhman (FIDE)	2
102	R Canino (PHI)	0
91	DO Gunawardhana (SRI)	½
38	A Lee (USA)	1½
59	M Kamalidenova (KAZ)	2
70	A Sliwicka (POL)	0
-	Bye 6
6	A Goryachkina (FIDE)

Second round
11	R Vaishali (IND)	2
54	M-J Ouellet (CAN)	0
43	I Krush (USA)	0
22	C Yip (USA)	2
27	A Shukhman (FIDE)	2
38	A Lee (USA)	0
59	M Kamalidenova (KAZ)	2½
6	A Goryachkina (FIDE)	1½

Third round
11	R Vaishali (IND)	4
22	C Yip (USA)	2
27	A Shukhman (FIDE)	½
59	M Kamalidenova (KAZ)	1½

Fourth round
11	R Vaishali (IND)	4½
59	M Kamalidenova (KAZ)	3½

==== Section 7 ====
First round
7	K Lagno (FIDE)
-	Bye 7
71	A Avramidou (GRE)	2½
58	N Toncheva (BUL)	1½
39	V Agrawal (IND)	1½
90	L Shohradova (TKM)	½
103	J February (RSA)	½
26	A Ushenina (UKR)	1½
23	S Tsolakidou (GRE)	1½
106	E Yuliana (INA)	½
87	MJ Campos (ARG)	0
42	M Zhai (CHN)	2
55	PV Nandhidhaa (IND)	2
74	A Ortiz Verdezoto (ECU)	0
-	Bye 10
10	H Dronavalli (IND)

Second round
7	K Lagno (FIDE)	4
71	A Avramidou (GRE)	2
39	V Agrawal (IND)	4½
26	A Ushenina (UKR)	3½
23	S Tsolakidou (GRE)	1½
42	M Zhai (CHN)	½
55	PV Nandhidhaa (IND)	½
10	H Dronavalli (IND)	1½

Third round
7	K Lagno (FIDE)	3½
39	V Agrawal (IND)	2½
23	S Tsolakidou (GRE)	2
10	H Dronavalli (IND)	4

Fourth round
7	K Lagno (FIDE)	2½
10	H Dronavalli (IND)	3½

==== Section 8 ====
First round
15	D Deshmukh (IND)
-	Bye 15
79	K Mgeladze (GEO)	1½
50	LTN Phạm (VIE)	½
47	O Kiolbasa (POL)	1½
82	J Ryjanova (AUS)	½
-	Bye 18
18	T Injac (SRB)
31	A Maltsevskaya (POL)	2
98	JM Zaki (EGY)	0
95	L Nassr (ALG)	½
34	L Mkrtchian (ARM)	1½
63	A Kairbekova (KAZ)	1
66	M Alinasab (IRI)	3
-	Bye 2
2	J Zhu (CHN)

Second round
15	D Deshmukh (IND)	1½
79	K Mgeladze (GEO)	½
47	O Kiolbasa (POL)	½
18	T Injac (SRB)	1½
31	A Maltsevskaya (POL)	2½
34	L Mkrtchian (ARM)	1½
66	M Alinasab (IRI)	½
2	J Zhu (CHN)	1½

Third round
15	D Deshmukh (IND)	1½
18	T Injac (SRB)	½
31	A Maltsevskaya (POL)	0
2	J Zhu (CHN)	2

Fourth round
15	D Deshmukh (IND)	2½
2	J Zhu (CHN)	1½

== Rounds 5–7 ==
Quarterfinals
1	Lei Tingjie (CHN)	2
8	Nana Dzagnidze (GEO)	0
28	Song Yuxin (CHN)	½
4	Koneru Humpy (IND)	1½
3	Tan Zhongyi (CHN)	1½
11	Vaishali Rameshbabu (IND)	½
10	Harika Dronavalli (IND)	1
15	Divya Deshmukh (IND)	3

Semifinals
1	Lei Tingjie (CHN)	3
4	Koneru Humpy (IND)	5
3	Tan Zhongyi (CHN)	½
15	Divya Deshmukh (IND)	1½

Finals
4	Koneru Humpy (IND)	1½
15	Divya Deshmukh (IND)	2½
3rd Place
1	Lei Tingjie (CHN)	½
3	Tan Zhongyi (CHN)	1½

=== Third place ===
Seed	Name	Jul 2025 rating	1	2	Total
1	(China) Lei Tingjie	2557	½	0	½
3	(China) Tan Zhongyi	2527	½	1	1½

=== Finals ===
Seed	Name	Jul 2025 rating	1	2	Tb1	Tb2	Total
4	(India) Koneru Humpy	2536	½	½	½	0	1½
15	(India) Divya Deshmukh	2463	½	½	½	1	2½

== See also ==
- Chess World Cup 2025
