= Women's event at the 45th Chess Olympiad =

2024 chess tournament in Budapest

- Host city: Budapest
- Country: Hungary
- Nations: 180
- Teams: 183
- Athletes: 909
- Dates: 11–22 September 2024
- Main venue: SYMA Sports and Conference Centre

Medalists

Team
- 1st place, gold medalist(s): India
- 2nd place, silver medalist(s): Kazakhstan
- 3rd place, bronze medalist(s): United States

Individual
- Board 1: (China) Zhu Jiner
- Board 2: (United States) Carissa Yip
- Board 3: (India) Divya Deshmukh
- Board 4: (India) Vantika Agrawal
- Reserve: (Israel) Dana Kochavi

The Women's event at the 45th Chess Olympiad was from 11 to 22 September 2024. It was contested by a record number of 183 teams, representing 180 nations. Hungary, as host nation, fielded three teams. A total of 909 players participated in the Women's event.

India won the gold medal in the Women's event, which was their first overall win at the Chess Olympiads. Kazakhstan won the silver and the United States took the bronze medals. Dana Kochavi, playing as a reserve for Israel, had the highest performance rating of 2676 by achieving a perfect score of 8 out of 8 possible points. Individual gold medals were also won by Zhu Jiner of China with 7 out of 9 and a performance rating of 2597, Carissa Yip of the United States who had the highest individual score in the tournament of 10 out of 11 with a performance rating of 2634, Divya Deshmukh who scored 9½ out of 11 with a performance rating of 2608, and Vantika Agrawal of India with 7½ out of 9 and a performance rating of 2558.

== Competition format and calendar ==
The tournament was played in a Swiss system format. The time control for all games is 90 minutes for the first 40 moves, after which an additional 30 minutes were granted and increment of 30 seconds per move was applied from the first move. Players were permitted to offer a draw at any time. A total of 11 rounds were played, and all teams were paired in every round.

In each round, four players from each team faced four players from another team; teams were permitted one reserve player who could be substituted between rounds. The four games were played simultaneously on four boards with alternating colours, scoring 1 game point for a win and ½ game point for a draw. The scores from each game were summed together to determine which team would win the round. Winning a round was worth two match points, regardless of the game point margin, while drawing a round was worth one match point. Teams were ranked in a table based on match points. Tie-breakers for the table were i) the Sonneborn–Berger system; ii) total game points scored; iii) the sum of the match points of the opponents, excluding the lowest one.

The event took place from 10 to 23 September 2024. Tournament rounds started on 11 September and ended with the final round on 22 September. All rounds began at 15:00 CEST (UTC+2:00), except for the final round which began at 11:00 CEST (UTC+2:00). There was one rest day on 17 September, after the sixth round.

All dates are CEST (UTC+2:00)

1	Round	RD	Rest day

September	11th Wed	12th Thu	13st Fri	14th Sat	15th Sun	16th Mon	17th Tue	18th Wed	19th Thu	20th Fri	21st Sat	22nd Sun
Tournament round	1	2	3	4	5	6	RD	7	8	9	10	11

=== Teams and players ===
The Women's event was contested by a total of 909 players from 183 teams. It featured only Nana Dzagnidze from the top ten players according to the FIDE rating list published in September 2024. India had the highest pre-tournament average rating of 2467, but the team was weakened due to the absence of Koneru Humpy who played in 2022. The team was led by Harika Dronavalli and also included Vaishali R, Divya Deshmukh, Vantika Agrawal and Tania Sachdev. Georgia, whose team won a silver medal at the previous Olympiad, were the second seeds with an average rating of 2462. The squad consisted of Nana Dzagnidze, Lela Javakhishvili, Nino Batsiashvili, Bella Khotenashvili and Salome Melia. Poland were the third-seeded team with an average rating of 2422. The team was led by Alina Kashlinskaya, who won the first leg of the FIDE Women's Grand Prix 2024–25 in Tbilisi, and also includes Monika Soćko, Aleksandra Maltsevskaya, who changed federation, Oliwia Kiołbasa, who scored the best individual performance at the previous Olympiad, and Alicja Śliwicka.

Ukraine as defending champions were severely weakened due to the absence of Anna and Mariya Muzychuk, who were both among the top-ten rated players in the world. In their absence, the team was led by Yuliia Osmak on board one followed by former World Women's Champion Anna Ushenina, Nataliya Buksa, Inna Gaponenko and Evgeniya Doluhanova. Despite the fact that China was missing all four top players—Hou Yifan, Ju Wenjun, Tan Zhongyi and Lei Tingjie—the young team was still competitive and had the fourth highest average rating of 2416.

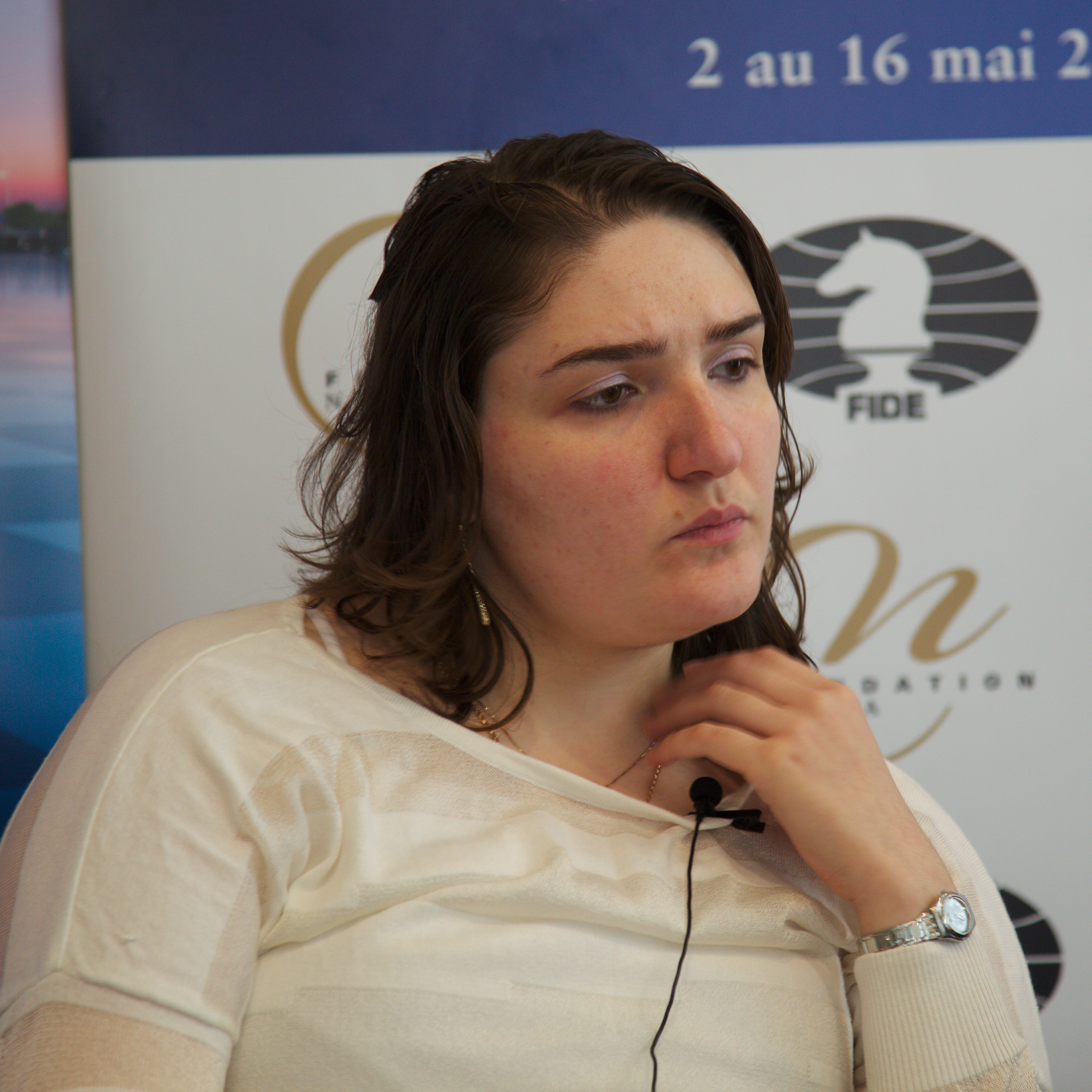
World no. 9 Nada Dzagnidze played on board one for Georgia.

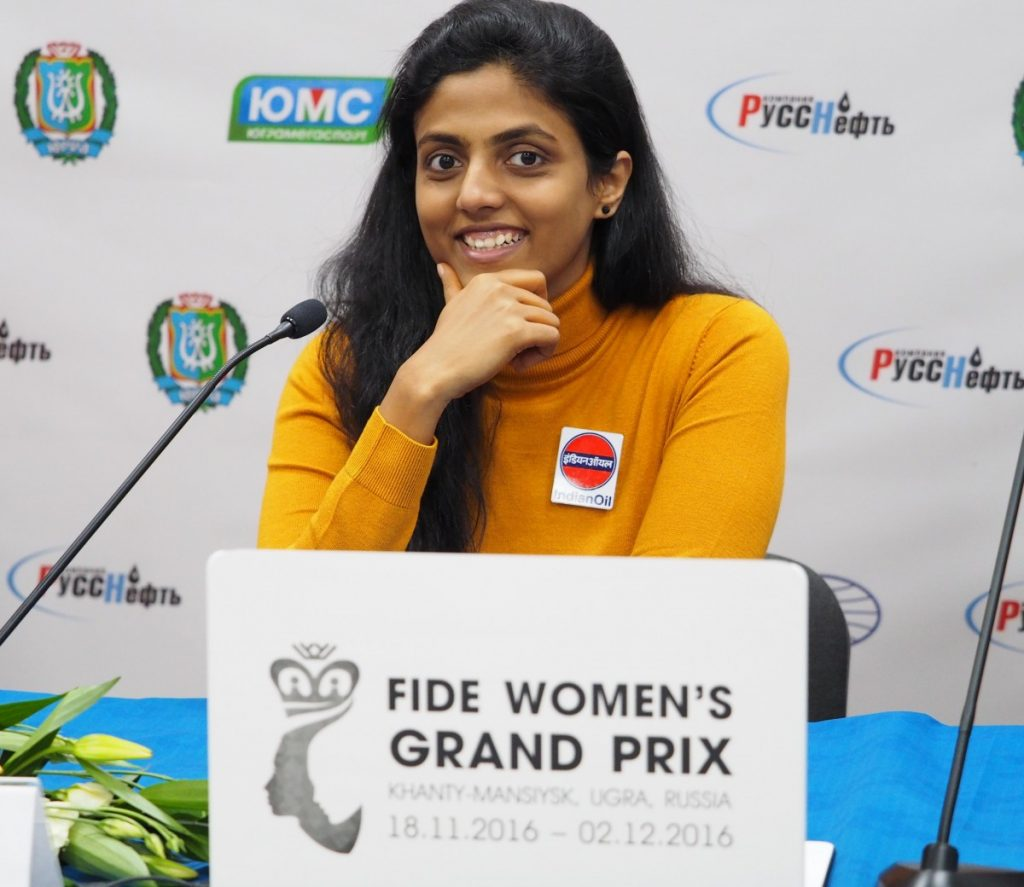
World no. 11 Harika Dronavalli played on board one for India.

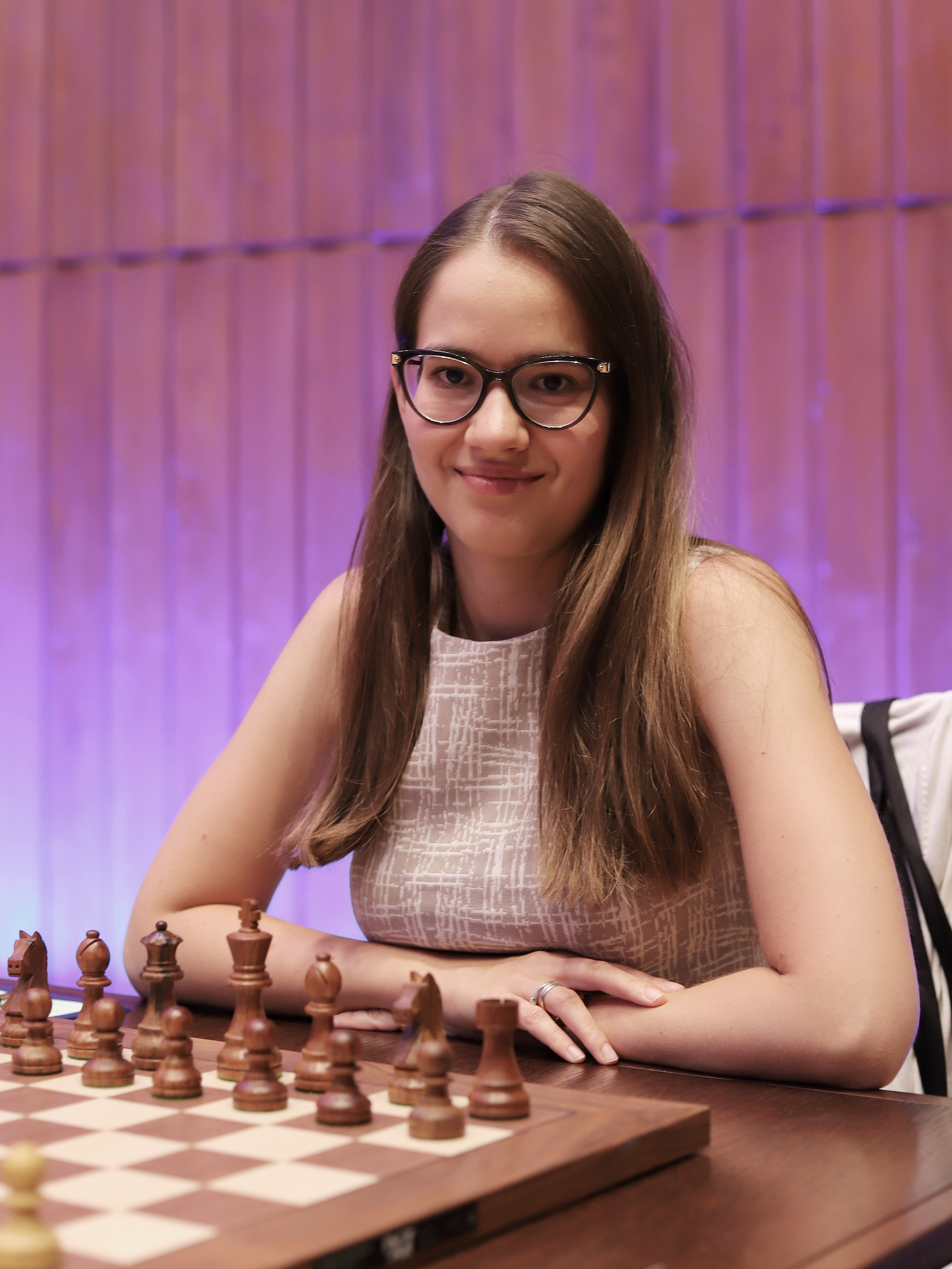
World no. 13 Alina Kashlinskaya played on board one for Poland.

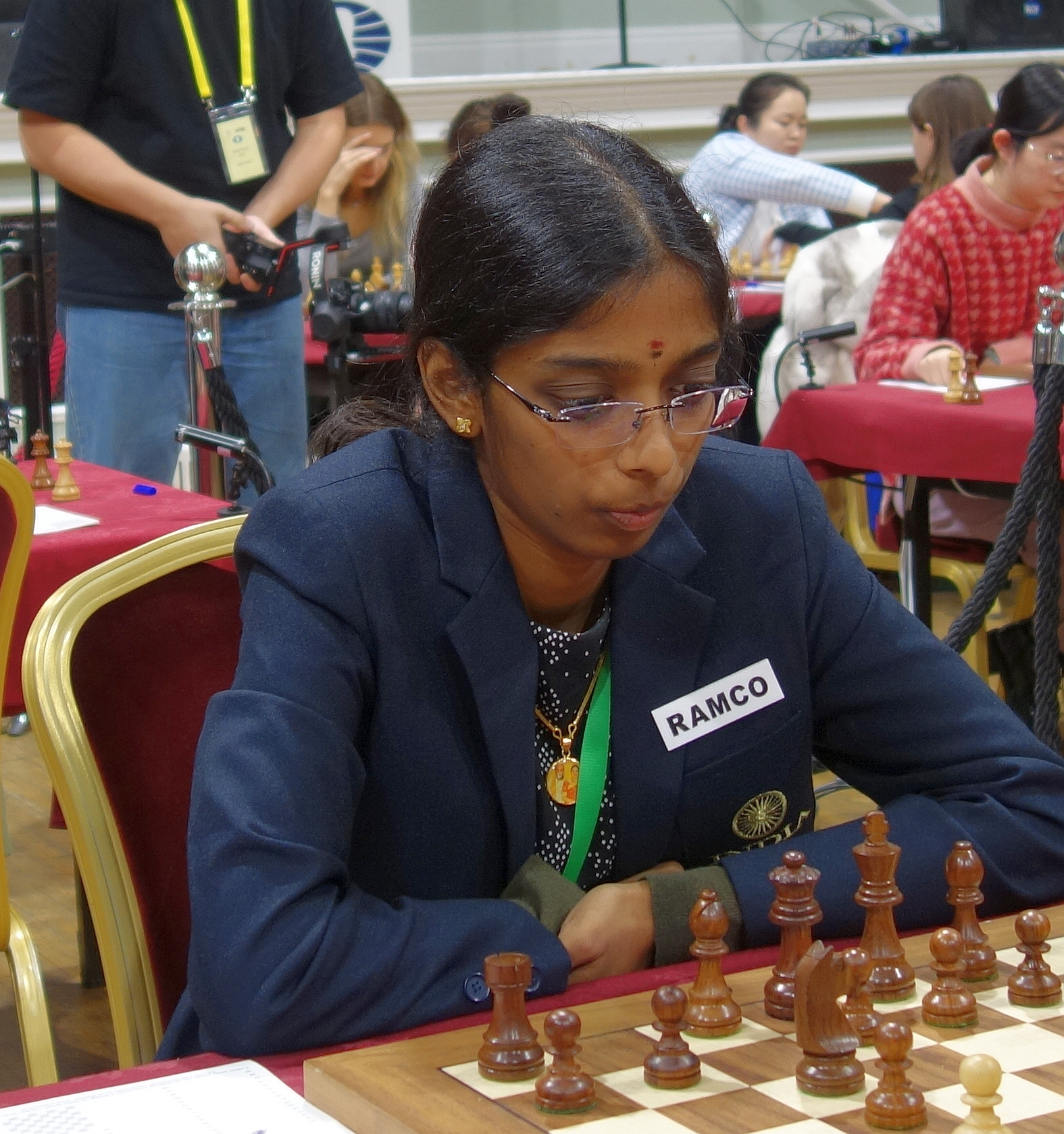
World no. 12 Vaishali Rameshbabu played on board two for India.

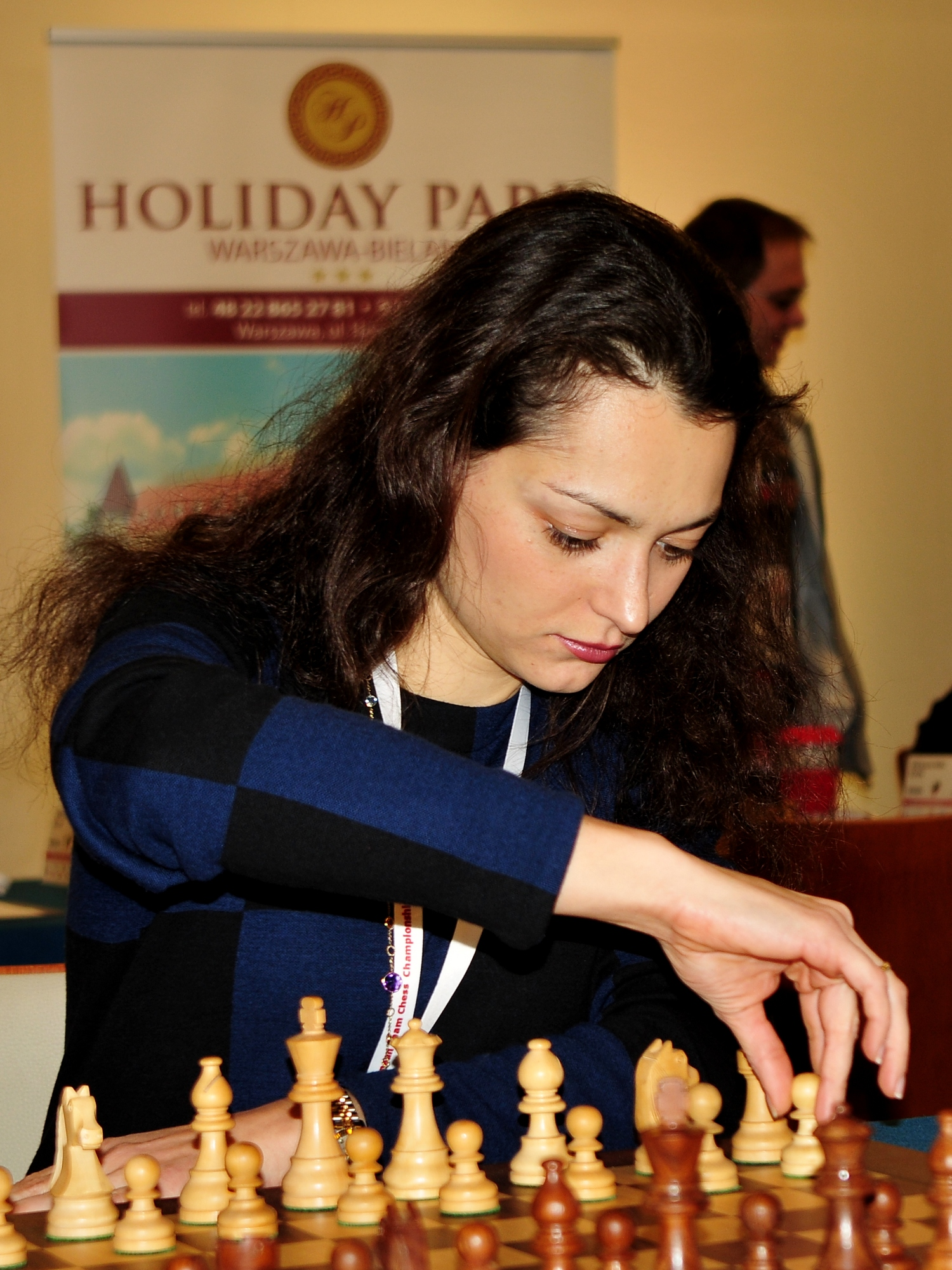
Former Women's World Champion Alexandra Kosteniuk played on board one for Switzerland.

== Rounds ==
=== Round 1 ===
Javikhashvili vs. Rouda Essa

Position: a8 black rook, e8 black rook, f8 black knight, g8 black king, a7 black pawn, b7 black pawn, d7 black bishop, e7 black bishop, f7 black pawn, g7 black pawn, h7 black pawn, b6 black queen, e6 black pawn, d5 black pawn, e5 white pawn, h5 white queen, f4 white bishop, h4 white pawn, c3 white pawn, d3 white bishop, f3 white knight, a2 white pawn, b2 white pawn, f2 white pawn, g2 white pawn, b1 white rook, e1 white king, h1 white rook

This is the position after 14... Bd7?? in which Javikhashvili played 15. Bxh7+!. The game continued with 15... Nxh7 16. Ng5 Nf8 17. Qxf7 Kh8 18. h5 Bb5 19. h6 g6 20. Qg7#.

The favourites were in full command in the first round, and a total of 72 teams scored 4–0 victories. Amongst the favourites, Georgia, Poland and China whitewashed their opponents. Defending champions Ukraine and the top seeds India conceded a half point after former Women's World Champion Anna Ushenina was held to a draw by Kyrzgyzstan's Alexandra Samaganova on the top board and India's Vantika Agrawal split the point with Jamaica's Raehanna Brown in a queen endgame on board three. The highest-rated player in the tournament Nana Dzagnidze did not play in this round, but her team was one of the first to finish the day with four convincing wins. Lela Javakhishvili played a 20-move miniature in the London System that ended with a checkmate (see diagram).

=== Round 2 ===
Osmak vs. Martynkova

Position: a8 black rook, d8 black rook, g8 black king, a7 black pawn, b7 black pawn, f7 black pawn, h7 black pawn, c6 black pawn, d6 white pawn, e6 black queen, g6 black pawn, c5 white bishop, e5 black bishop, a4 white pawn, c4 black knight, e4 white pawn, g4 white bishop, c2 white queen, d2 white rook, f2 white pawn, g2 white pawn, h2 white pawn, b1 white rook, g1 white king

In this position, Black tactically sacrificed a piece with 22. Bxh2+!, after which the game continued with 23. Kxh2 Qe5+ 24. g3 Nxd2 and White played the losing move 25. Rb4? (25. Re1! was the only move). Osmak resigned after 34 moves in a position with two exchanges down.

There were no major upsets in the second round and a total of 41 teams scored victories in the opening two matches. Poland, China, Spain and Armenia scored their second 4–0 victories, while India, Hungary, United States, Bulgaria and France dropped a half point against Czech Republic, Ecuador, Philippines, Egypt and Luxembourg, respectively. Georgia defeated Montenegro 3–1 thanks to wins by Nana Dzagnidze, Nino Batsiashvili and Bella Khotenashvili on the first three boards, but Nikolina Koljević scored an upset win with the Black pieces over Salome Melia on the lowest board after the Georgian misplayed the position with a space-gaining pawn push.

Ukraine were one of the top-seeded teams that struggled the most in this round, but finally they managed to edge out Lithuania with a 2½–1½ scoreline. On the top board, Yuliia Osmak lost her game as White to Olena Martynkova, and Evgeniya Doluhanova drew against Gabija Šimkūnaitė on the lowest board. Martynkova fought back from a worse position to implement tactics by sacrificing a piece that led her to a winning position (see diagram). However, the Ukrainian team snatched the match victory with wins scored by Nataliya Buksa and Inna Gaponenko on the middle boards. Another close match was Kazakhstan's minimal victory over Finland in which Finnish player Lauri Bederdin beat Alua Nurman and Anastasia Nazarova drew against Bibisara Assaubayeva on board one. The biggest surprise in this round was perhaps Singapore's 2½–1½ victory over Latvia thanks to wins scored by Kay Yan Eden Pang and Kun Fang both with the Black pieces.

=== Round 3 ===
Ciolacu vs. Khotenashvili

Position: d8 black rook, f8 black rook, h8 black king, b7 black pawn, f7 black pawn, h7 black knight, c6 black pawn, g5 white rook, h5 white queen, a4 black pawn, d4 white pawn, e4 black queen, a3 white pawn, f3 white rook, b2 white pawn, e2 white knight, h2 white pawn, g1 white king

This is the position in which Black blundered with 35... Qxe2?? and subsequently resigned after 36. Qxh7+ because of the inevitable checkmate (36... Kxh7 37. Rh3+ Qh5 38. Rxh5#).

The third round saw the first upsets involving top-seeded teams. Georgia were held to a draw by Romania in a match wherein Nana Dzagnidze and Nino Batsiashvili defeated Irina Bulmaga and Carmen Voicu-Jagodzinsky on the first and third boards, respectively, to score full points for the Georgian team, but the Romanian players were victorious on the other boards. Mihaela Sandu caught Lela Javakhishvili in a mating net in the endgame, while Bella Khotenashvili blundered a mate in two against Alessia-Mihaela Ciolacu (see diagram). Poland and Greece tied with one per side. Ekaterini Pavlidou won a roller-coaster game against Aleksandra Maltsevskaya with the three queens on the board and the black king on d3, whereas the best player at the previous Olympiad Oliwia Kiołbasa beat Marina Makropoulou to score a full point for the Polish team. Nevertheless, the biggest upset in this round was perhaps Uzbekistan's victory over the host country Hungary with a 2½–1½ scoreline. Afruza Khamdamova benefited from Zsóka Gaál's blunder in a pure rook endgame to win a full point on the top board, while Umida Omonova also triumphed as Black on the third board.

Of the top-seeded teams, India, China and Ukraine did not have problems in this round. India defeated Switzerland 3–1. Alexandra Kosteniuk scored for the Swiss team against Harika Dronavalli on board one, but all other games finished in favour of the Indian players. On the second board, Vaishali Rameshbabu entered into a same-colour bishop endgame that she managed to convert due to the king's superior activity despite the material parity. Divya Deshmukh scored her third victory in the tournament by checkmating Sofiia Hryzlova with a pawn on board three.

=== Round 4 ===
Krush vs. Bensdorp-De Labaca

Position: e8 black rook, g8 black king, a7 white rook, f7 black pawn, g7 black pawn, c5 black knight, f5 white knight, h5 black pawn, a4 black pawn, h4 white pawn, e3 white pawn, f3 white pawn, a2 black rook, g2 white pawn, d1 white rook, h1 white king

This is the position after Black blundered with 35... Nc5?? (blocking the d-file with 35... Nd2 was equal). Krush played 36. Rd5! and won after 41 moves.

Seven teams—China, India, United States, Armenia, Kazakhstan, Uzbekistan and Mongolia—scored their fourth consecutive match victories in this round. China showed a dominant performance to sweep England 4–0 and move to a cumulative score of 15½ out of 16 from the individual boards after four rounds. Zhu Jiner, Guo Qi, Ni Shiqun and 14-year-old Lu Miaoyi all kept their perfect scores. The top-seeded Indian team cruised to a 3½–½ victory over France, while the United States defeated the Netherlands with the same scoreline. On board three, American player Irina Krush found the winning 36th move after her opponent committed a blunder in an equal position (see diagram).

Ukraine split the match points with Turkey. The games on the top boards ended peacefully, while both teams exchanged wins on the lower boards. Nataliya Buksa scored a full point with the White pieces against Kübra Öztürk on board three, but Evgeniya Doluhanova lost to 18-year-old Gulenay Aydin on board four. Uzbekistan edged out Bulgaria 2½–1½ in a match wherein Afruza Khamdamova scored the only win by beating former Women's World Champion Antoaneta Stefanova. Mongolia upset Spain with the same scoreline due to the victories from Batkhuyagiin Möngöntuul and Bat-Erdene Mungunzul with the White pieces. Mungunzul trapped Ana Matnadze's queen on board four, while Möngöntuul launched a crushing attack with opposite-colour bishops to beat Marta García Martín on board two. The game on the top board between Sarasadat Khademalsharieh and Törmönkhiin Mönkhzul ended in a draw, while the most entertaining game was Sabrina Vega's victory in which she repeated Nigel Short's famous king walk.

=== Round 5 ===
Ilze vs. Salimova

Position: e8 black rook, f8 black king, c7 black pawn, g7 black bishop, a6 black pawn, d6 black pawn, c5 black pawn, d5 black queen, f5 black knight, g5 white queen, h5 black pawn, f4 white bishop, g4 black pawn, h4 white pawn, b3 white pawn, a2 white pawn, f2 white pawn, g2 white pawn, h2 white knight, f1 white rook, h1 white king

In this position, after Salimova played 29... Kf8, White's queen is out of squares. The game continued with 30. f3 g3! 31. Bxg3 Qf7 32. Re1 Bh6 and Ilze resigned as the queen is trapped.

India, Armenia and Mongolia won their fifth consecutive matches in the fifth round. Armenia surprised China with a minimal 2½–1½ victory. Anna Sargsyan scored a full point for Armenia by beating Lu Miaoyi, Elina Danielian drew her game with Ni Shiqun, and Song Yuxin won for China against Mariam Mkrtchyan. Sargsyan sacrificed two queenside pawns and launched a decisive attack with a queen and two knights while the Black pieces were uncoordinated. The decisive game was played on the top board where Lilit Mkrtchian played precisely to pull off a win over Zhu Jiner, who pushed too hard for a win and ended up in a worse position. Mongolia narrowly defeated the United States 2½–1½ thanks to Turmunkh Munkhzul's victory over Gulrukhbegim Tokhirjonova in a rook endgame on board one.

The top-seeded Indian team triumphed over Kazakhstan with a 2½–1½ scoreline, but their win was more convincing than the result suggests. Harika Dronavalli built up a winning advantage in her game with Bibisara Assaubayeva, but gradually went down to a lost rook endgame. However, Vaishali Rameshbabu and Vantika Agrawal were already winning on their boards to turn the match result in India's favour. Spain and Bulgaria recovered from the losses in the previous round with minimal wins over Norway and Latvia, respectively. On the first board in the match between Latvia and Bulgaria, Nurgyul Salimova found a tactical opportunity to convert her advantage by trapping the opponent's queen (see diagram). In the other matches involving strong teams, Georgia edged out Uzbekistan 2½–1½, Poland beat Turkey 3–1, and Azerbaijan played a 2–2 tie with Ukraine.

=== Round 6 ===
Deshmukh vs. Danielian

Position: c8 black rook, e8 black king, f8 black bishop, h8 black rook, a7 black pawn, b7 black pawn, c7 black queen, d7 black bishop, f7 black pawn, g7 black pawn, h7 black pawn, e6 black pawn, a5 black knight, d5 black pawn, e5 white pawn, g5 white knight, b3 white rook, c3 white pawn, d3 white bishop, a2 white pawn, e2 white queen, f2 white pawn, g2 white pawn, h2 white pawn, c1 white bishop, e1 white rook, g1 white king

This is the position after Black played 15... Na5?, after which 16. Qh5! was already winning. Deshmukh, however, played 16. Rb1?! and got a winning position after 16... Bc6 (16... h5! was the only move to save the game). White won after 40 moves.

India became the sole leader after they had kept the perfect score with the minimal win over Armenia. Divya Deshmukh won the only decisive game against Elina Danielian as a result of the advantage gained in the opening (see diagram). On the other boards, Harika Dronavalli had some chances in a bishop versus knight endgame on board one and Tania Sachdev was winning on board four, but their games ended in a draw. China suffered a second consecutive loss in their match with Poland. Oliwia Kiołbasa won the only full point by defeating Guo Qi on board three. After winning nine consecutive games at the previous Olympiad, Kiołbasa moved to 4½ out of 5 games with this win. Alina Kashlinskaya also had an opening advantage against Zhu Jiner, but the Chinese neutralised it later in the game. Georgia scored a similar victory over Mongolia thanks to Salome Melia's strong endgame technique in her win against Erdenebayar Khuslen on the fourth board.

Ukraine scored a 3–1 victory against Serbia thanks to wins by Yuliia Osmak, Anna Ushenina and Inna Gaponenko on the first three boards, whereas Jovana Erić was the only one to score a full point for the Serbian team. Azerbaijan narrowly defeated Vietnam 2½–1½, and the United States triumphed over Switzerland with the same scoreline. The Americans were in trouble following Mariya Manko's one-sided victory over Anna Zatonskih on the fourth board, but Carissa Yip and Alice Lee won on boards two and three to secure the match victory. Gulrukhbegim Tokhirjonova as White held Alexandra Kosteniuk to a draw. Peru surprisingly tied with Hungary, and Australia upset Israel with a minimal victory.

=== Round 7 ===
Osmak vs. Kashlinskaya

Position: f8 black rook, g8 black king, c7 black queen, f7 black pawn, g7 black pawn, h6 black pawn, b5 black pawn, c5 white pawn, e5 white knight, f5 white queen, c4 black pawn, f4 white rook, g4 white pawn, h4 white pawn, d2 black knight, f2 white pawn, h2 white king

In this position, White made the final mistake by playing 32. Nd7? (32. g5!), which allows Black to attack the g5-square. Kashlinskaya won the game after 40 moves.

The seventh round featured the clash between the first seeds India and the second seeds Georgia, which the Indian team won convincingly with a 3–1 scoreline because of Vaishali Rameshbabu's and Vantika Agrawal's victories both with the Black pieces. Vaishali played a game in which she was never worse but lost her advantage before finally defeating Lela Javakhishvili, while Vantika made complications on move 21 with only 33 seconds on the clock. She resisted and relied on the 30-second increment for the next 19 moves and eventually won the game.

Ukraine and Poland exchanged one win per side in a 2–2 tie. Alina Kashlinskaya scored a full point for the Polish team on board one by defeating Yuliia Osmak in the time trouble (see diagram). However, the Ukrainians struck back with a win by Nataliya Buksa over Oliwia Kiołbasa in a tense knight endgame on board three. This draw enabled Kazakhstan and France to join Poland in the tie for the second place. Kazakhstan defeated Azerbaijan 3–1, while France narrowly beat Spain 2½–1½ in a match with many upside downs. In the other matches, Armenia drew with the United States as well as Mongolia with Germany, while China swept Australia.

=== Round 8 ===
Vantika vs. Śliwicka

Position: a8 black queen, h8 black king, g7 black bishop, c6 black pawn, f6 black rook, h6 black pawn, a5 white pawn, h5 white pawn, g4 white queen, b3 white bishop, g3 white pawn, e2 white rook, g2 white king

This is the position in which Vantika played 56. Qe4??, which allowed Black to capture the pawn in a5 (any move that does not blunder the a-pawn retains White's advantage). Śliwicka correctly responded with 56... Qxa5!, and the game was drawn after 79 moves.

In the central match of the eighth round, Poland inflicted the first loss on India, ending their winning streak of seven match victories and joining them in the lead. Alina Kashlinskaya defeated Harika Dronavalli and Monika Soćko scored a full point against Vaishali R on the top two boards to put the Polish team in a commanding lead. Divya Deshmukh bounced back with a win over Aleksandra Maltsevskaya on board three, and Vantika Agrawal ended up in a must-win situation. The Indian had a winning position against Alicja Śliwicka and was set to achieve her fifth consecutive victory in the tournament, but a blunder on the 56th move allowed Black to capture the passed a-pawn, which was the winning trump in White's position, and the game ended in a draw (see diagram).

Kazakhstan have also benefited from India's loss and joined the leaders with a narrow 2½–1½ victory over France because of wins scored by Bibisara Assaubayeva over Deimantė Cornette and Alua Nurman against Pauline Guichard. Guichard was pawn up with great posts for her pieces, but a series of mistakes in the time trouble brought her to a loss. France had another chance to save the match, but Kazakh teenager Amina Kairbekova escaped from a lost position and drew her game. In the other matches involving strong teams, Ukraine edged out Hungary 2½–1½ thanks to the only win in the match scored by Anna Ushenina, while the United States and Armenia cruised to convincing 3½-½ victories against Uzbekistan and Mongolia, respectively. These victories helped Ukraine, the United States and Armenia to stay with a one-match point deficit behind the co-leaders.

=== Round 9 ===
Sachdev vs. Lee

Position: a8 black rook, e8 black rook, f8 black bishop, g8 black king, a7 black pawn, f7 black pawn, a6 black bishop, b6 black queen, c6 black pawn, g6 black pawn, h6 black pawn, c5 black knight, d5 black pawn, e5 white pawn, f5 white bishop, b4 black pawn, d4 white knight, f4 white bishop, g4 white pawn, e3 white pawn, a2 white pawn, b2 white pawn, c2 white queen, f2 white pawn, h2 white pawn, b1 white king, d1 white rook, h1 white rook

In this position, Sachdev missed the winning continuation 21. e6!! and played 21. Bxg6!?, after which the game continued with 21... fxg6 22. Qxg6+ Kh8 23. e6 and Lee found the defensive resource 23... Qb7!. The game was drawn with a three-fold repetition after White's 29th move.

The top match of the ninth round was the clash between Kazakhstan and Poland. All games on the top three boards ended in a draw, and the match was decided on the lowest board where Alua Nurman defeated Alicja Śliwicka. Before the time control, Śliwicka had a promising position, but afterwards the 17-year-old Nurman outplayed her with the Black pieces and won after 86 moves. This victory helped the Kazakh team to take the lead from India, whose match with the United States ended in a fighting draw. Tania Sachdev launched a huge attack in a game with opposite-sides castling against Alice Lee, but she missed a crushing continuation on move 21 and the game was eventually drawn (see diagram). Gulrukhbegim Tokhirjonova scored a win for the United States after Vaishali Rameshbabu had blundered a two-move tactic, whereas Carissa Yip made a draw with Divya Deshmukh. In the last game of the match, Vantika Agrawal defeated Irina Krush as Black with a ferocious kingside.

In the matches involving other pre-tournament favourites, Georgia convincingly defeated France 3½–½ with victories by Nana Dzagnidze, Nino Batsiashvili and Bella Khotenashvili, while China defeated Turkey thanks to the wins by Zhu Jiner and Ni Shiqun on the top and the lowest boards. Ukraine played a 2–2 with Armenia in a match wherein both teams exchanged one win per side on the lower boards. Germany defeated England 3–1 because of wins scored on the lower boards, Spain cruised to a strong 3½–½ victory over the Netherlands, and Vietnam snatched a narrow 2½–1½ match win against Bulgaria.

=== Round 10 ===
Deskhmukh vs. Ni

Position: h8 black queen, b7 black king, f7 black pawn, b6 black pawn, c6 black pawn, d6 black rook, e6 black bishop, a5 black pawn, d5 black pawn, e5 white rook, g5 white pawn, d4 white pawn, f4 white queen, g4 white pawn, a3 white pawn, d3 white bishop, b2 white pawn, c2 white pawn, b1 white king

This is the position in which Deskhmukh made the final blow by playing 39. Rxe6!, after which Ni immediately resigned. Black cannot re-capture on e6 without losing the rook because 39... Rxe6 is losing to Qxf7+ and 39... fxe6 to 40. Qxd6.

In the penultimate round, the leading team of Kazakhstan faced Georgia. The match ended undecided with draws on all boards. Alua Nurman, who secured Kazakhstan's victory over Poland in the previous round, proved to be pivotal for her team once again after drawing a worse position against Bella Khotenashvili. India narrowly defeated China 2½–1½ to catch Kazakhstan in a shared lead before the final round. The only decisive game in the match was played on board three where 18-year-old Divya Deshmukh defeated Ni Shiqun. The Indian attacked from the early middlegame and converted her advantage in a style with a crushing final move (see diagram). With 8½ points scored in 10 games, Divya remained in competition for individual gold medal on board three.

Poland and the United States remained in the gold-medal race with minimal victories over Germany and Ukraine, respectively. Oliwia Kiołbasa defeated Hanna Marie Klek on the lowest board to score for the Polish team in the only decisive game. The United States were powered by the winning performances from Gulrukhbegim Tokhirjonova and Carissa Yip on the top two boards. Yip moved to a score of 9 points out of 10 games with the second-highest performance rating of 2607 in the tournament. In the other matches involving pre-tournament favourites, Hungary defeated Vietnam 2½–1½ thanks to the only win in the match scored by Zsóka Gaál as Black on the top board; Azerbaijan and Bulgaria achieved minimal victories against Mongolia and Israel, respectively; and the match between Spain and Armenia ended in a 2–2 tie with both teams exchanging two wins per side.

=== Round 11 ===
India and Kazakhstan entered the final round tied for the first place. India scored a convincing 3½–½ victory over Azerbaijan with wins by Harika Dronavalli, Divya Deshmukh and Vantika Agrawal to win the gold medal, whereas Kazakhstan drew with the United States in a match with one win per side. The Kazakh team had chances to win the match as Alua Nurman won a pawn after Alice Lee missed a tactic. However, the American managed to hold the draw. Kazakhstan finished with one match point behind India to win the silver medal, while the United States won the tie-breaker with Spain, Armenia and Georgia to claim the bronze medal.

== Final standings ==
India won the gold medal in the Women's event with a total of 19 match points, having recorded nine wins, one draw and one loss. It was India's first overall win at the Chess Olympiad. The team justified their role as pre-tournament top seeds according to the average rating, and defeated Georgia in the seventh and China in the tenth rounds on the road to the gold medal, but also lost to the third-seeded team of Poland in the eighth and drew with the United States in the ninth rounds. Kazakhstsan had a strong performance that earned them the silver medal with 18 match points (eight wins, two draws and one loss), and the United States completed the podium with 17 match points (eight wins, one draw and two losses). Following India's loss to Poland and draw with the United States, the Kazakh team was sole leader with two rounds to go. However, they lost the lead due to the two ties with Georgia and the United States in the final rounds. The US team had the best tie-breaker amongst the four teams tied for the third place, ahead of Spain, Armenia and Georgia, which got them the bronze medal. Without their top players, China finished in seventh place and defending champions Ukraine came eighth.

The highest performance rating of 2676 was achieved by Dana Kochavi who played as a reserve for Israel and had a perfect score of 8 out of 8 possible points. Individual gold medals were also won by Zhu Jiner of China with 7 out of 9 and a performance rating of 2597, Carissa Yip of the United States who had the highest individual score in the tournament of 10 out of 11 with a performance rating of 2634, Divya Deshmukh who scored 9½ out of 11 with a performance rating of 2608, and Vantika Agrawal of India with 7½ out of 9 and a performance rating of 2558.

Women's event
#	Country	Players	Average rating	MP	dSB^{†}
1st place, gold medalist(s)	India	Harika, Vaishali, Divya, Vantika, Tania	2467	19	
2nd place, silver medalist(s)	Kazakhstan	Assaubayeva, Kamalidenova, Balabayeva, Nurman, Kairbekova	2373	18	
3rd place, bronze medalist(s)	United States	Tokhirjonova, Yip, Krush, Lee, Zatonskih	2387	17	418.0
4	Spain	Khademalsharieh, García Martín, Vega, Matnadze, Calzetta Ruiz	2375	17	402.0
5	Armenia	Mkrtchian L., Mkrtchyan M., Danielian, Sargsyan, Gaboyan	2363	17	391.0
6	Georgia	Dzagnidze, Javakhishvili, Batsiashvili, Khotenashvili, Melia	2462	17	388.0
7	China	Zhu Jiner, Song Yuxin, Guo Qi, Ni Shiqun, Lu Miaoyi	2416	16	434.0
8	Ukraine	Osmak, Ushenina, Buksa, Gaponenko, Doluhanova	2400	16	355.5
9	Poland	Kashlinskaya, Soćko, Maltsevskaya, Kiołbasa, Śliwicka	2422	16	352.0
10	Bulgaria	Stefanova, Salimova, Radeva, Krasteva, Peycheva	2355	16	348.5

Notes

- Average ratings calculated by chess-results.com based on September 2024 FIDE ratings.
- ^‡ The Sonneborn-Berger score is a tie-breaking criterion used to rank teams with equal match points.

All board prizes were given out according to performance ratings for players who played at least eight games at the tournament. Dana Kochavi as a reserve player the best performance of all players in the tournament. The winners of the gold medal on each board are listed in turn:

- Board 1: (China) Zhu Jiner 2597
- Board 2: (United States) Carissa Yip 2634
- Board 3: (India) Divya Deshmukh 2608
- Board 4: (India) Vantika Agrawal 2558
- Reserve: (Israel) Dana Kochavi 2676

== See also ==
- Open event at the 45th Chess Olympiad
