= FIDE rankings =

Chess rankings for players and countries

The International Chess Federation (FIDE) governs international chess competition. Each month, FIDE publishes rating lists including "Top 100 Players", "Top 100 Women", "Top 100 Juniors", "Top 100 Girls", and national rankings based on the average rating of each country's top 10 players and top 10 female players in classical chess. Ratings are calculated using the Elo rating system.

== Top players ==
Best Performing Federations – Open
| Federation | Players (Among Top 100) |
|---|---|
| United States | 17 |
| India | 13 |
| China | 7 |
| Russia | 6 |
| Uzbekistan | 5 |
| Azerbaijan | 5 |
| Ukraine | 4 |
| Armenia | 4 |
| France | 3 |
| Netherlands | 3 |
| England | 3 |
| Germany | 3 |
| Norway | 3 |
| Other | 18 |

The top 20 players were ranked on 1 November 2026 as follows:

| Rank | Player | Rating |
|---|---|---|
| 1 | (Norway) Magnus Carlsen | 2823 |
| 2 | (United States) Hikaru Nakamura | 2792 |
| 3 | (United States) Fabiano Caruana | 2783 |
| 4 | (Uzbekistan) Javokhir Sindarov | 2782 |
| 5 | (Uzbekistan) Nodirbek Abdusattorov | 2772 |
| 6 | (United States) Wesley So | 2771 |
| 7 | (India) R Praggnanandhaa | 2763 |
| 8 | (China) Wei Yi | 2761 |
| 9 | (Germany) Vincent Keymer | 2761 |
| 10 | (France) Alireza Firouzja | 2757 |
| 11 | (Netherlands) Anish Giri | 2747 |
| 12 | (India) Arjun Erigaisi | 2746 |
| 13 | (Poland) Jan-Krzysztof Duda | 2741 |
| 14 | (India) Viswanathan Anand | 2739 |
| 15 | (United States) Leinier Domínguez | 2732 |
| 16 | (Vietnam) Lê Quang Liêm | 2732 |
| 17 | (China) Ding Liren | 2723 |
| 18 | (Iran) Amin Tabatabaei | 2720 |
| 19 | (India) Nihal Sarin | 2720 |
| 20 | (United States) Levon Aronian | 2719 |

== Top women ==
Best Performing Federations – Women
| Federation | Players (Among Top 100) |
|---|---|
| India | 11 |
| China | 11 |
| Kazakhstan | 7 |
| United States | 6 |
| Ukraine | 6 |
| France | 6 |
| Russia | 5 |
| Georgia | 5 |
| Azerbaijan | 4 |
| FIDE | 4 |
| Poland | 4 |
| Bulgaria | 4 |
| Armenia | 3 |
| Other | 19 |

The top 20 female players were ranked on 1 November 2026 as follows:

| Rank | Player | Rating |
|---|---|---|
| 1 | (China) Hou Yifan | 2596 |
| 2 | (China) Zhu Jiner | 2559 |
| 3 | (China) Ju Wenjun | 2553 |
| 4 | (China) Lei Tingjie | 2552 |
| 5 | (FIDE) Aleksandra Goryachkina | 2540 |
| 6 | (China) Tan Zhongyi | 2536 |
| 7 | (Kazakhstan) Bibisara Assaubayeva | 2532 |
| 8 | (Ukraine) Anna Muzychuk | 2524 |
| 9 | (India) Koneru Humpy | 2520 |
| 10 | (FIDE) Polina Shuvalova | 2514 |
| 11 | (FIDE) Kateryna Lagno | 2506 |
| 12 | (India) Divya Deshmukh | 2488 |
| 13 | (Switzerland) Alexandra Kosteniuk | 2478 |
| 14 | (United States) Alice Lee | 2474 |
| 15 | (Poland) Alina Kashlinskaya | 2474 |
| 16 | (Georgia (country)) Nana Dzagnidze | 2467 |
| 17 | (China) Song Yuxin | 2465 |
| 18 | (Georgia (country)) Nino Batsiashvili | 2463 |
| 19 | (Ukraine) Mariya Muzychuk | 2463 |
| 20 | (Ukraine) Anastasiia Hnatyshyn | 2462 |

== Top juniors ==
Best Performing Federations – Juniors
| Federation | Players (Among Top 100) |
|---|---|
| India | 16 |
| United States | 10 |
| FIDE | 10 |
| Turkey | 7 |
| France | 5 |
| Poland | 5 |
| China | 4 |
| Kazakhstan | 4 |
| Germany | 4 |
| Israel | 4 |
| Ukraine | 3 |
| Azerbaijan | 3 |
| Uzbekistan | 3 |
| Iran | 3 |
| Other | 15 |

Juniors are considered to be players who will remain under the age of 21 years for the duration of the current calendar year.

The top 20 juniors were ranked on 1 November 2026 as follows:

| Rank | Player | Rating |
|---|---|---|
| 1 | (Turkey) Yağız Kaan Erdoğmuş | 2719 |
| 2 | (India) Gukesh Dommaraju | 2710 |
| 3 | (India) Pranav V | 2679 |
| 4 | (India) Pranesh M | 2673 |
| 5 | (FIDE) Volodar Murzin | 2663 |
| 6 | (Turkey) Ediz Gürel | 2649 |
| 7 | (United States) Abhimanyu Mishra | 2644 |
| 8 | (France) Marc'Andria Maurizzi | 2641 |
| 9 | (Belarus) Denis Lazavik | 2636 |
| 10 | (United States) Andy Woodward | 2635 |
| 11 | (India) Leon Luke Mendonca | 2617 |
| 12 | (India) Aditya Mittal | 2616 |
| 13 | (Uzbekistan) Mukhiddin Madaminov | 2612 |
| 14 | (Ukraine) Ihor Samunenkov | 2610 |
| 15 | (United States) Christopher Yoo | 2588 |
| 16 | (Czech Republic) Vaclav Finek | 2609 |
| 17 | (India) Pranav Anand | 2607 |
| 18 | (Poland) Jan Malek | 2598 |
| 19 | (China) Xiao Tong | 2598 |
| 20 | (India) Bharath Subramaniyam | 2595 |

== Top girls ==
Best Performing Federations – Girls
| Federation | Players (Among Top 100) |
|---|---|
| India | 14 |
| FIDE | 11 |
| United States | 8 |
| China | 7 |
| Kazakhstan | 6 |
| Ukraine | 6 |
| Mongolia | 6 |
| France | 4 |
| Uzbekistan | 4 |
| Argentina | 3 |
| Iran | 3 |
| Other | 22 |

Girls are considered to be female players who will remain under the age of 21 years for the duration of the current calendar year.

The top 20 girls were ranked on 1 November 2026 as follows:

| Rank | Player | Rating |
|---|---|---|
| 1 | (United States) Alice Lee | 2474 |
| 2 | (Ukraine) Anastasiia Hnatyshyn | 2462 |
| 3 | (Kazakhstan) Alua Nurman | 2460 |
| 4 | (Uzbekistan) Afruza Khamdamova | 2447 |
| 5 | (United States) Rachael Li | 2430 |
| 6 | (Netherlands) Eline Roebers | 2429 |
| 7 | (FIDE) Anna Shukhman | 2421 |
| 8 | (England) Bodhana Sivanandan | 2414 |
| 9 | (China) Lu Miaoyi | 2411 |
| 10 | (India) Savitha Shri Baskar | 2405 |
| 11 | (India) Pratitee Bordoloi | 2393 |
| 12 | (India) Kalyani Sirin | 2386 |
| 13 | (Kazakhstan) Elnaz Kaliakhmet | 2383 |
| 14 | (Iran) Melika Mohammadi | 2378 |
| 15 | (Kazakhstan) Amina Kairbekova | 2355 |
| 16 | (India) Modipalli Deekshitha | 2349 |
| 17 | (Hungary) Zsóka Gaál | 2349 |
| 18 | (France) Emilie Negre | 2337 |
| 19 | (India) Velpula Sarayu | 2337 |
| 20 | (India) Shubhi Gupta | 2335 |

== Top federations ==
Every month, FIDE publishes a list ranking federations according to the average rating of their top 10 players. The top 20 federations in Open were ranked on 1 November 2026 as follows:

| Rank | Federation | Average top 10 rating |
|---|---|---|
| 1 | United States | 2719 |
| 2 | India | 2706 |
| 3 | China | 2663 |
| 4 | Russia | 2638 |
| 5 | France | 2632 |
| 6 | Azerbaijan | 2631 |
| 7 | Uzbekistan | 2631 |
| 8 | Germany | 2630 |
| 9 | Ukraine | 2625 |
| 10 | Armenia | 2606 |
| 11 | Hungary | 2603 |
| 12 | Netherlands | 2603 |
| 13 | Spain | 2600 |
| 14 | Poland | 2590 |
| 15 | England | 2584 |
| 16 | Norway | 2580 |
| 17 | Turkey | 2573 |
| 18 | Israel | 2565 |
| 19 | Iran | 2557 |
| 20 | Serbia | 2549 |
