= Gao Muziyan =

Chinese chess player (born 2011)

Personal information
- Born: August 2011 (age 14) Xinghua, Jiangsu

Chess career
- Country: China
- Title: Woman International Master (2025)
- Peak rating: 2325 (May 2025)

Gao Muziyan (Chinese: 高木子嫣) is a Chinese chess player.

== Chess career ==
In June 2024, she finished in second place in the U14 Girls section of the Asian Youth Blitz Championship.

In March 2025, she won the Zonal 3.5 China tournament with a score of 7/9, qualifying to play in the Women's Chess World Cup 2025. She was also awarded the Woman International Master title.

In July 2025, she played in the Women's Chess World Cup 2025, where she was defeated by Candela Francisco in the first round after holding her to a draw in the first game.
