= Priyanka K =

Indian chess player (born 2001)

Personal information
- Born: August 3, 2001 (age 24) Coimbatore, India

Chess career
- Country: India
- Title: Woman International Master (2019)
- Peak rating: 2227 (February 2022)

Priyanka K (born 2001) is an Indian chess player who holds the title of Woman International Master, which she earned in 2019. She won silver medal at 50th women's edition of Indian Chess Championship 2024 in Karaikudi, got qualified for the Women's Chess World Cup 2025 in Georgia

== Chess career ==
Priyanka K qualified for the Women's Chess World Cup 2025, where she defeated Zsóka Gaál in blitz tiebreaks in the first round, before being defeated by Klaudia Kulon on rapid tiebreaks in the second round.
