= Wang Chuqiao =

Chinese chess player (born 2008)

Personal information
- Born: 2008 (age 17–18) Fuling, Chongqing

Chess career
- Country: China
- Title: Woman International Master (2024)
- Peak rating: 2302 (January 2024)

Wang Chuqiao (Chinese: 王楚乔) is a Chinese chess player.

== Chess career ==
In November 2023, she won the U16 Girls section of the World Youth Chess Championship.

She qualified for the Women's World Cup 2025 through her finishing in fourth place at the Zonal 3.5 China tournament.

In July 2025, she played in the Women's Chess World Cup 2025. She defeated the higher-seeded Deysi Cori in an upset in the first round, but was defeated by Yuliia Osmak in the second round.
