= Jana Mohamed Zaki =

Egyptian chess player (born 2009)

Personal information
- Born: 2009 (age 16–17)

Chess career
- Country: Egypt
- Title: Woman International Master (2025)
- Peak rating: 2023 (June 2025)

Jana Mohamed Zaki (born 2009) is an Egyptian chess player who holds the title of Woman International Master, which she earned in 2025.

== Chess career ==
Zaki won the National Youth Chess Championship in February 2025, finishing on 8.5/10.

In 2025, aged 15, she earned bronze in the women's section of the African Chess Championship.

Zaki qualified for the Women's Chess World Cup 2025 by earning one of the continental spots, where she was defeated by Aleksandra Maltsevskaya in the first round.
