= Devindya Oshini Gunawardhana =

Sri Lankan chess player (born 2012)

Personal information
- Born: February 2, 2012 (age 14)

Chess career
- Country: Sri Lanka
- Title: Woman International Master (2025)
- Peak rating: 2347 (March 2026)

Devindya Oshini Gunawardhana is a Sri Lankan chess player.

== Chess career ==
In October 2022, she finished in first place at the Asian Youth Chess Championship.

In October 2023, she won the U12 Girls World Youth Chess Championship. She also became the youngest Sri Lankan player to achieve the Woman FIDE Master title.

In April 2024, she won the Sri Lankan Women's Chess Championship.

In July 2024, she became the youngest Sri Lankan player to achieve the Woman International Master title, doing so after winning the Western Asian Under-20 Girls Tournament at the age of 12 years 5 months 21 days.

In September 2024, she played for Sri Lanka in the 45th Chess Olympiad. Out of the 9 games she played, she won 8 and drew 1.

In July 2025, she played in the Women's Chess World Cup 2025, where she was defeated by Alice Lee in the first round after holding her to a draw in the first game.

== Personal life ==
She attends Wycherley International School.
