= Kiran Manisha Mohanty =

Indian chess woman grandmaster

Personal information
- Born: 9 April 1989 (age 37) Bhubaneswar, Orissa, India

Chess career
- Country: India
- Title: Woman Grandmaster (2010)
- Peak rating: 2316 (April 2008)

Kiran Manisha Mohanty (born 9 April 1989) is an Indian chess player. She holds the title of Woman Grandmaster. She was the Runners up in Asian Junior Girls Championship held at New Delhi in 2006.

== Achievements ==
- Runners up in Asian Junior Girls Chess Championship, New Delhi in 2006
- First female chess player from Odisha to achieve Woman International Master (2006), Woman's National 'B' title (2007), and Woman Grandmaster (2010).

== See also ==
- Tania Sachdev
- Koneru Humpy
- Harika Dronavalli
- Nadig Kruttika
- Eesha Karavade
- Padmini Rout
