= Kesaria Mgeladze =

Georgian chess player (born 2010)

Personal information
- Born: 2010 (age 15–16) Batumi, Georgia

Chess career
- Country: Georgia
- Title: Woman International Master (2025)
- Peak rating: 2290 (October 2025)

Kesaria Mgeladze (Georgian: კესარია მგელაძე; born 2010) is a Georgian chess player who holds the title of Woman FIDE Master (2023).

== Biography ==
Kesaria Mgeladze is student of Batumi chess school. She won the Georgian Girls' Chess Championships in the G12 age group (2022) and G13 age group (2023). In 2022, she won the Adjara Youth Chess Championship in the U16 age group.

She has represented Georgia several times at the European Youth Chess Championships and World Youth Chess Championships. At the European Youth Chess Championship in 2018, she won 4th place in the girls' G8 age group. In 2019, she won the European School Chess Championship in the G9 girls' age group. In 2023, she won the European School Chess Championship in the G13 girls' age group and the European Girls' Chess Championship in the G14 age group.

In February 2025, she placed 6th in the Georgian Women's Chess Championship.

Kesaria Mgeladze qualified for the Women's Chess World Cup 2025, defeating Vietnamese International Master and Woman Grandmaster Phạm Lê Thảo Nguyên in the first round, before being defeated by Indian Woman Grandmaster Divya Deshmukh in the second round.
