= Anastasia Kirtadze =

Georgian chess player (born 2009)

Personal information
- Born: 2009 (age 16–17)

Chess career
- Country: Georgia
- Title: Woman International Master (2025)
- Peak rating: 2308 (November 2025)

Anastasia Kirtadze (born 2009) is a Georgian chess player who holds the title of Woman International Master, which she earned in 2025.

== Chess career ==
Kirtadze won the FIDE World Under-14 Championship in rapid chess, and the Under-15 World School Chess Championship in 2023.

Kirtadze qualified for the Women's Chess World Cup 2025, defeating Ana Matnadze in the first round, before being defeated by former world champion Tan Zhongyi in the second round.
