= Wadifa Ahmed =

Bangladeshi chess player (born 2008)

Personal information
- Born: 2008 (age 17–18) Milan, Italy

Chess career
- Country: Bangladesh
- Title: Woman International Master (2025)
- Peak rating: 2109 (April 2025)

Wadifa Ahmed (born 2008) is a Bangladeshi chess player. In 2025, she became the 4th Bangladeshi to earn the title of Woman International Master.

== Early life ==
Wadifa Ahmed was born in 2008 in Milan, Italy to Mainuddin Ahmed and Taslima Khatun. Wadifa's elder sister, Walijah Ahmed (b. 2003), is also an active chess player with Woman Candidate Master title. The sisters moved to Bangladesh with their mother in 2015. Grandmaster Enamul Hossain trained them for competitions.

== Career ==
Ahmed earned Woman FIDE Master (WFM) in 2023. In January 2024, she became the unbeaten champion at the National Junior Women's (U-20) Championships. She qualified for the Women's Chess World Cup 2025.
