= Evi Yuliana =

Indonesian chess player (born 2002)

Personal information
- Born: 2002 (age 23–24)

Chess career
- Country: Indonesia
- Title: Woman FIDE Master (2025)
- Peak rating: 1968 (October 2024)

Evi Yuliana (born 2002) is an Indonesian chess player who holds the title of Woman FIDE Master, which she earned in 2025.

== Chess career ==
Yuliana represented Indonesia on board four in the 45th Chess Olympiad, finishing on 8.5/11.

Yuliana qualified for the Women's Chess World Cup 2025, where she was defeated by Stavroula Tsolakidou in the first round.
