= Isabelle Yixuan Ning =

New Zealand chess player (born 2009)

Personal information
- Born: August 2009 (age 17)

Chess career
- Country: New Zealand
- Title: Candidate Master (2023); Woman International Master (2026)
- Peak rating: 2117 (October 2025)

Isabelle Yixuan Ning is a New Zealand chess player who holds the FIDE title of Woman International Master (WIM).

== Chess career ==
In January 2020, at the age of 10 years and 5 months, she won the New Zealand Junior Championship, becoming the youngest player in New Zealand's history to win the Junior Champion title.

In July and August 2022, Ning participated at the 44th Chess Olympiad (women) in Chennai, representing New Zealand at the third board. She finished the event with a personal score of 4/8.

In September 2023, she won the New Zealand Women's Chess Championship with a final score of 6½/7.

In September 2024, Ning represented New Zealand again at third board in the 45th Chess Olympiad (women) in Budapest, scoring 5/9.

In August 2025, Ning represented New Zealand at first board in the U16 Chess Olympiad in Barranquilla, finishing the event with a score of 2½/9.

In July 2025, she qualified to play in the Women's Chess World Cup 2025, where she was defeated by grandmaster Valentina Gunina in the first round after holding her to a draw in the first game.

In September 2025, she won the New Zealand South Island Chess Championship with a final score of 7/8., this made her the first female champion to win the tournament outright in the tournament's 70-year history.

In December 2025, she won the Oceania Youth Chess Championship(G20), with a final score of 8/9.
