= Zala Urh =

Slovenian chess player (born 2002)

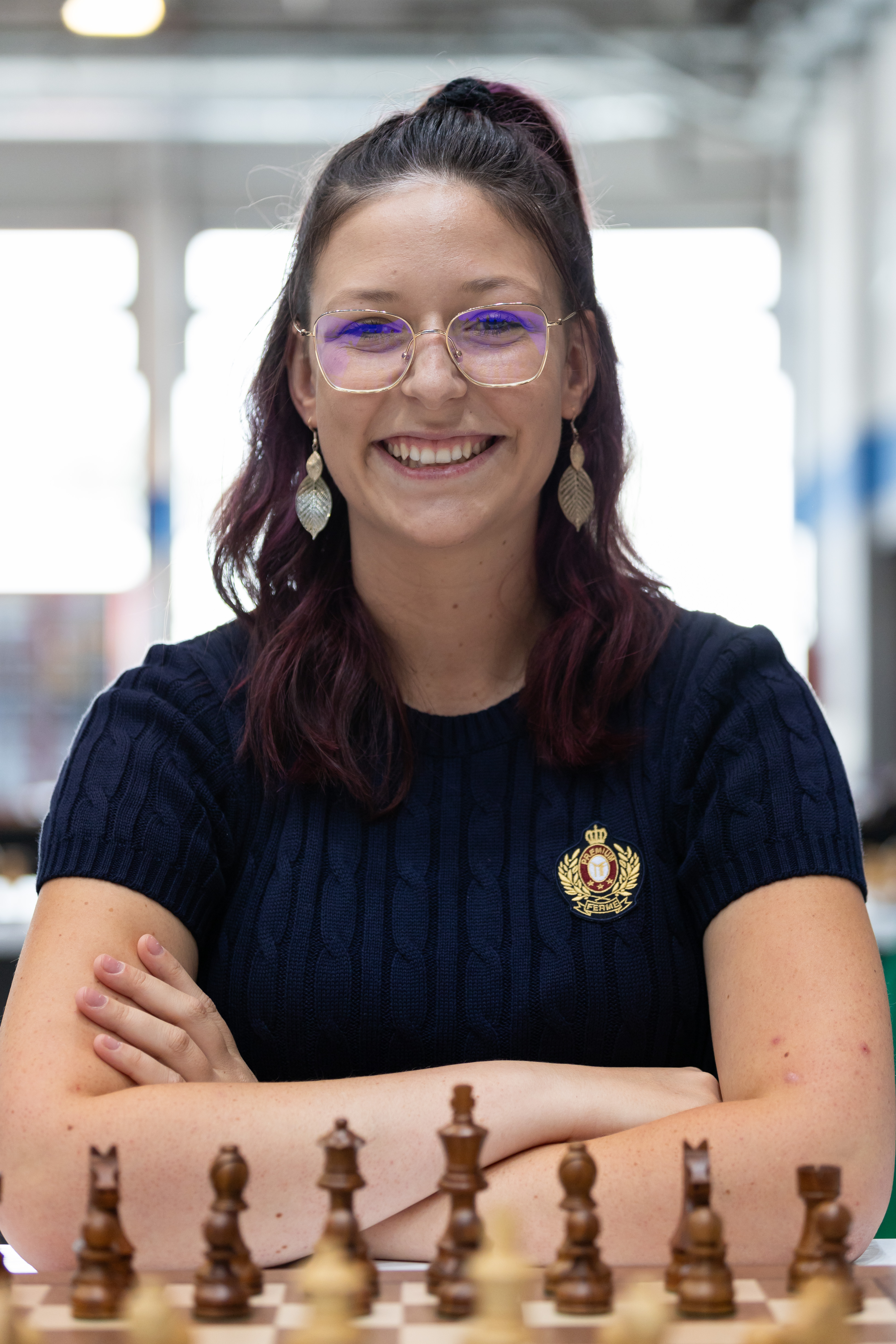

Personal information
- Born: April 15, 2002 (age 24) Ljubljana, Slovenia

Chess career
- Country: Slovenia
- Title: Woman International Master (2020)
- Peak rating: 2333 (November 2021)

Zala Urh (born 2002) is a Slovenian chess player who holds the title of Woman Grandmaster, which she earned in 2025.

== Chess career ==
Urh finished sixth at the World Junior Chess Championship in 2019. In 2022, Urh earned the Slovenian national junior championship title, and ended fourth at the World Junior Chess Championship that year.

She won the Mediterranean Flower Chess Tournament in 2024. That year she also represented Slovenia in the 45th Chess Olympiad, finishing on 6/11.

Urh qualified for the Women's Chess World Cup 2025, where she was defeated 2.5/1.5 by Inna Gaponenko in the first round.
