= Zhang Lanlin =

Chinese chess player (born 1999)

Personal information
- Born: 1999 (age 26–27) Chongqing, China

Chess career
- Country: China
- Title: Woman International Master (2025)
- Peak rating: 2306 (October 2025)

Zhang Lanlin (Chinese: 张岚琳) is a Chinese chess player.

== Chess career ==
In November 2022, she finished in 7th place at the Chinese Chess Championship.

In July 2024, she finished in 14th place at the Belt and Road Women's Chess Festival. She was the highest-finishing untitled player and held Dinara Wagner and Zhai Mo to draws.

She qualified for the Women's World Cup 2025 through her finishing in second place at the Zonal 3.5 China tournament.

In July 2025, she played in the Women's Chess World Cup 2025, where she was defeated by Padmini Rout in the first round.
