= Sri Venkateswara Bala Kuteer =

Private school in Guntur, Andhra Pradesh, India

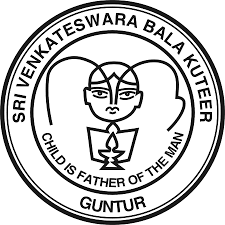
- Guntur, Andhra Pradesh; India

Information
- School type: Private, Public
- Motto: Child is Father of the Man William Wordsworth
- Established: 1965; 61 years ago
- School district: Guntur
- Gender: Co-education
- Language: English
- Houses: Benjamin, Hahnemann, Ramanujan, Thompson
- Colors: Blue & White
- Nickname: Kuteerians
- Affiliations: CBSE, BSEAP
- Website: svbk.edu.in

Sri Venkateswara Bala Kuteer (SVBK) is a private school located in Guntur, Andhra Pradesh, India. It was established in 1965 by Dr. Nannapaneni Manga Devi and Ms. Garige Prabhavathi. The school has grades from pre-primary to the 10th (ages 3 to 15). The school has three branches—Brodipet branch (affiliated to Andhra Pradesh Board of Secondary Education), Syamala Nagar branch (affiliated to CBSE) and Ushodaya English Medium School in Chowdavaram (affiliated to CBSE).

== History ==
The first branch in Brodipet, Guntur was established in 1965 by Dr. Nannapaneni Manga Devi and Ms. Garige Prabhavathi. Later, two more branches were opened in Syamala Nagar and Chowdavaram in 1975 and 2012 respectively. Dr. Nannapaneni Manga Devi is the Founder-Secretary of Sri Venkateswara Bala Kuteer and Chetana Charitable Trust.

== Notable alumni ==
Name	Occupation	References
P. V. Sindhu	Badminton player (Olympic silver medal)	
Harika Dronavalli	Chess grandmaster (Padma Shri and Arjuna Award recipient)	
Karthik Mikkilineni	Professor in Vascular Surgery, Stanford University	
