= Hannah Wilson (chess player) =

Barbadian chess player (born 2009)

Personal information
- Born: 2009 (age 16–17)

Chess career
- Country: Barbados
- Title: Woman FIDE Master (2024)
- Peak rating: 1949 (December 2024)

Hannah Wilson (born 2009) is a Barbadian chess player who holds the title of Woman FIDE Master, which she earned in 2024.

== Chess career ==
In 2022, Wilson finished fifth in the Girls Under-13 category at the FIDE World School Chess Championship in Panama.

That same year, she represented the Barbados women's team at the 44th Chess Olympiad, finishing on 5.5/10.

In November 2024, Wilson won the national female chess championship for the second time, previously having been the youngest winner, at age 13, in 2022.

Wilson qualified for the Women's Chess World Cup 2025 by winning the Subzone 2.3.3 Women's Chess Championships with a perfect score of 9/9. At the World Cup, she was defeated by Carissa Yip in the first round.
