= Anahita Zahedifar =

Iranian chess player (born 2003)

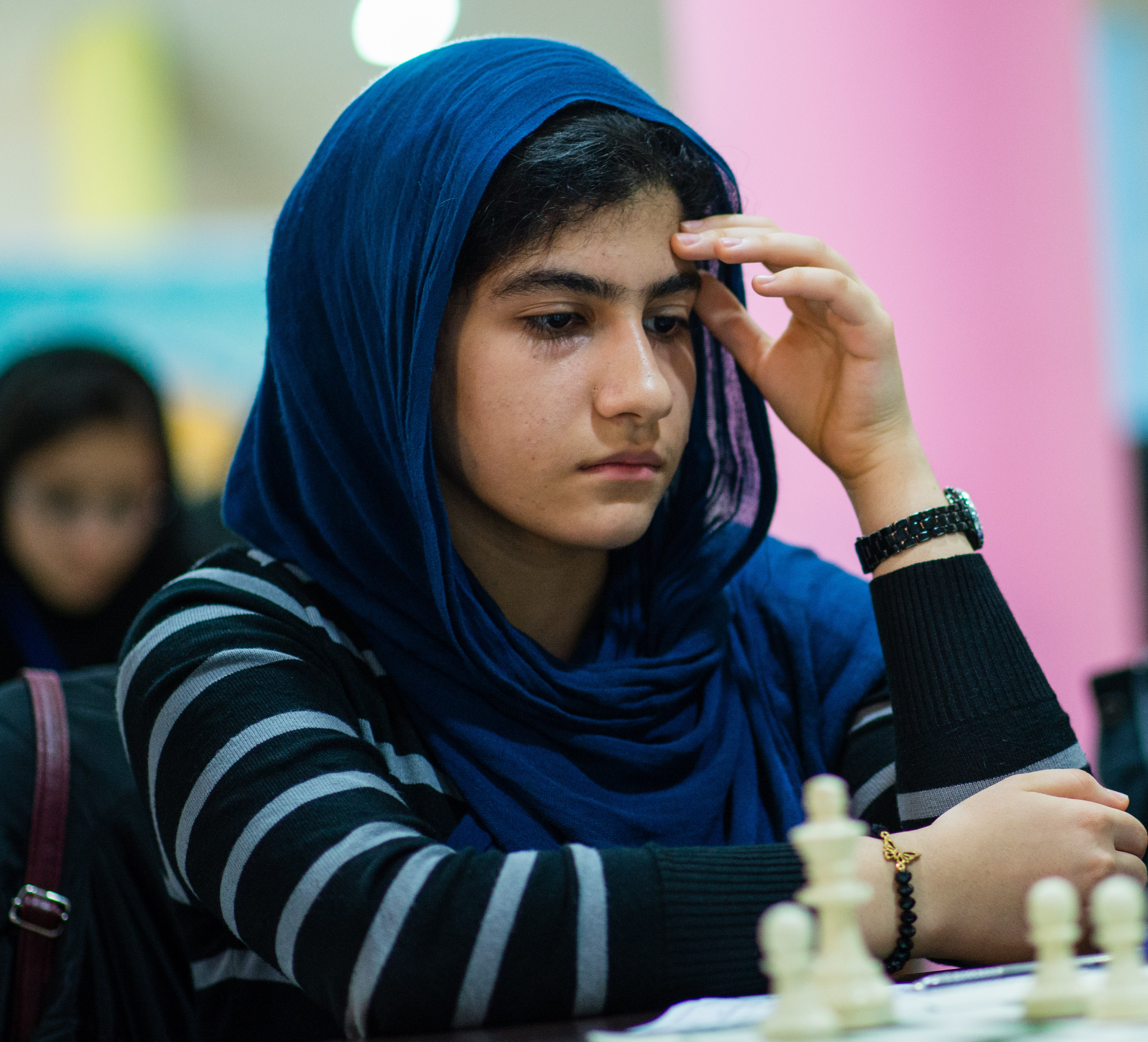

Personal information
- Born: 16 January 2003 (age 23)

Chess career
- Country: Iran
- Title: Woman International Master (2025)
- Peak rating: 2213 (January 2020)

Anahita Zahedifar (Persian: آناهیتا زاهدی‌فر; born January 16, 2003) is an Iranian chess player. She is a Woman FIDE Master (WFM) since 2015. She is ranked best female U18 in Iran, 8th female U18 in Asia, and 32nd female U18 in the world. Her highest rating was 2213 (in January 2020).

== Career ==
She won the Women Iranian Chess Championship in 2019, with 8.5 points out of 11 rounds.

She won the following competitions:

- Iran U-12 Girls Championship in 2014, with a score of 8/9.
- Asian Nations Cup U-14 Chess Team Championship and won 1st place alongside Arash Daghli, Mehdi Gholami, Seyed Kian Pourmousavai and Borna Derakhshani.
- 2016 World Youth U16 Chess Olympiad and won 1st place playing Board 5 alongside Parham Maghsoodloo, Alireza Firouzja, FM Aryan Gholami, Arash Tahbaz, and team captain Khosro Harandi.

She played in the women's event of the 43rd Chess Olympiad in 2018.
