= Thalia Cervantes Landeiro =

Cuban-American chess player (born 2002)

Personal information
- Born: November 28, 2002 (age 23) Havana, Cuba

Chess career
- Country: Cuba (until 2014); United States (since 2014)
- Title: FIDE Master (2020); Woman Grandmaster (2021)
- Peak rating: 2338 (June 2021)

Thalia Cervantes Landeiro (born November 28, 2002) is a Cuban-American chess player.

== Chess career ==
She began playing chess at the age of 7, and studied under grandmaster Walter Arencibia. She won the U12 category of the Central American and Caribbean Championship, and the U14 Havana Provincial Championship. She immigrated to the United States in 2014, winning the U19 Susan Polgar Girls' Invitational at the age of 12.

She has played for the United States in the 2021 Women's Chess Olympiad, where the team finished second overall.

In October 2022, she finished third in the U.S. Women's Championship.

== Personal life ==
She resides in St. Louis, Missouri, and studied sports business at Saint Louis University.
