= Harika Dronavalli =

Indian chess grandmaster (born 1991)

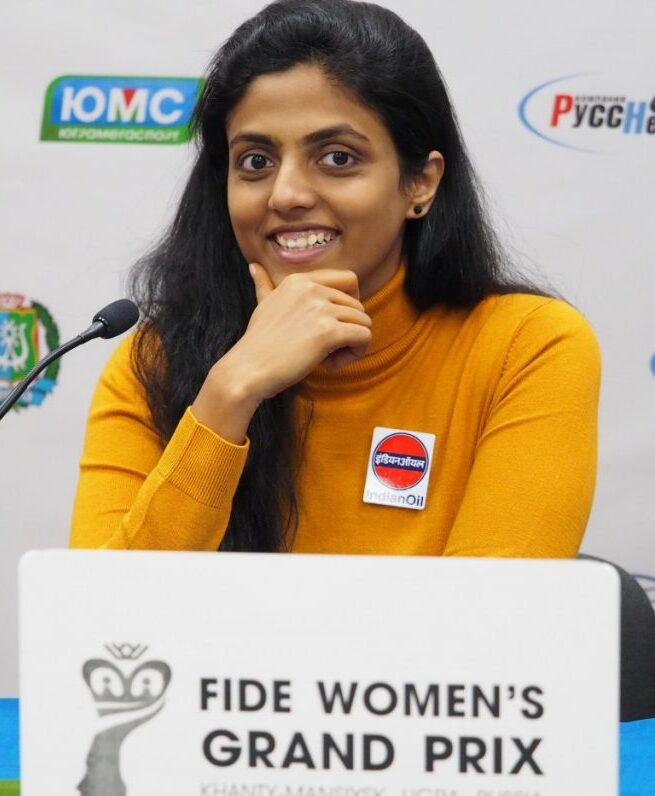
- Dronavalli in 2016

Personal information
- Born: 12 January 1991 (age 35) Guntur, Andhra Pradesh, India
- Spouse: Karteek Chandra (m. 2018)

Chess career
- Country: India
- Title: Grandmaster (2011)
- FIDE rating: 2453 (September 2026)
- Peak rating: 2543 (November 2016)

Harika Dronavalli (born 12 January 1991) is an Indian chess grandmaster. She was part of the gold winning women's team at the 45th Chess Olympiad in 2024. She has won three bronze medals in the Women's World Chess Championship, in 2012, 2015 and 2017. Harika was honored with the Arjuna Award for the year 2007–08 by the government of India. In 2016, she won the FIDE Women's Grand Prix event at Chengdu, China and rose up from world no. 11 to world no. 5 in FIDE women's ranking. In 2019, she was awarded the Padma Shri for her contributions towards the field of sports.

== Early life ==
Harika Dronavalli was born in a Telugu family to Ramesh and Swarna Dronavalli on 12 January 1991 in Guntur, Andhra Pradesh. She attended Sri Venkateswara Bala Kuteer school. Her father works as a deputy executive engineer at a Panchayat Raj subdivision in Mangalagiri. She started playing chess at a very young age and won a medal in the under-9 national championship. She followed it up with a silver medal in the world youth chess championship for under-10 girls. She subsequently became a student of coach NVS Ramaraju who refined her game.

== Personal life ==
She married Hyderabad-based Karteek Chandra in August 2018. She gave birth to her first child on 24 August 2022 after having played at the 2022 Chess Olympiad, where the Indian women won the bronze medal, while in her ninth month of pregnancy.

== Achievements ==
=== Awards ===
- 2003: Woman International Master (WIM) title - youngest woman international master, Asian continent
- 2004: Woman Grandmaster (WGM) Title - youngest woman grandmaster, Asian continent
- 2007: International Master (IM) title
- 2011: Grandmaster (GM) title - Second woman to become Grandmaster in India
- 2016 and 2017: Chess Player of the Year by The Times of India (TOISA Annual Awards)
- 2017: Featured by Verve magazine as one of the top 40 popular women sportspersons of the year
- 2019: Awarded Padma Shri on 26 January (Republic Day)

=== Competitions ===
Year	Competition	Location	Result
2000	World youth chess championship U-10 girls	Oropesa del Mar, Spain	Silver medal
2001	World youth chess championship U-12 girls	Spain	Silver medal
2001	Asian under-12 girls chess championship	Bikaner	Silver medal
2002	Asian U-18 girls Chess Championship	Bikaner	Gold medal
2002	Asian under-12 girls chess championship	Iran	Gold medal
2002	World youth chess championship U-12 girls	Greece	Bronze medal
2003	Commonwealth Chess Championship	Mumbai	Silver medal
2003	Asian Women's Chess Championship	Calicut	Silver medal
2003	Asian Women's Team Chess Championship	Jodhpur	Individual gold medal on fourth board
2004	Commonwealth U-18 girls chess championship	Mumbai	Gold medal
2004	Asian U-18 girls chess championship	Iran	Bronze medal
2004	World youth championship U-14 girls	Greece	Gold medal
2005	Asian junior girls championship	Bikaner	Silver medal
2006	World youth championship U-18 girls	Batumi	Gold medal
2006	Commonwealth Women's Chess Championship	Mumbai	Gold medal
2007	2nd Asian indoor games	Macau	Rapid chess individual women, gold medal Classical chess individual women, bronze medal Rapid chess team, gold medal Classical chess team, silver medal Blitz chess team, silver medal
2007	Asian zonal women chess championship	Bangladesh	Gold medal
2007	Commonwealth Women's Chess Championship	New Delhi	Gold medal
2008	World junior girls chess championship	Turkey	Gold medal
2008	Asian women team chess championship - Captain	Visakhapatnam	Team, silver medal Individual silver medal on top board
2009	Asian women team chess championship - Captain	Kolkata	Team, silver medal Individual gold medal on top board
2009	3rd Asian Indoor Games	Vietnam	Women individual rapid chess, bronze medal Team blitz chess, bronze medal Team rapid chess, bronze medal
2010	Commonwealth Women's Chess Championship	New Delhi	Gold medal
2010	16th Asian Games - Women's individual	Guangzhou	Bronze medal
2011	2011 Women grandmaster chess tournament	Hangzhou	Scored 5.5/9 securing her third GM norm, conferred by the 82nd FIDE Congress 2011 in Kraków
2011	Asian Women's Chess Championship	Iran	Gold medal
2011	Commonwealth Women's Chess Championship	South Africa	Silver medal
2012	Women's World Chess Championship	Khanty-Mansiysk	Bronze medal
2012	Asian Women's Team Chess Championship	China	Team, bronze medal
2012	40th Chess Olympiad	Istanbul	Team, fourth place
2012	Women's Team Chess Championship	Turkey	Individual, silver medal
2014	Asian Women's Team Chess Championship	Iran	Team standard format, silver medal Individual gold medal Team rapid format, silver medal
2015	Women's World online blitz Championship	Rome	Gold medal
2015	Women's Asian Rapid Chess Championship	UAE	Bronze medal
2015	Women's World Team Chess Championship	Chengdu	Individual second board, Silver Medal
2015	World Women's Chess Championship	Sochi	Bronze medal
2015	FIDE Women Grand Prix	Sharjah	Bronze medal
2016			
2016	FIDE Women's Grand Prix	Chengdu	Gold medal
2016	Asian Women's Team Chess Championship	UAE	Individual rapid format, gold medal Individual classical format, silver medal Team rapid format, bronze medal
2017	Women's World Chess Championship	Tehran	Bronze medal
2019	FIDE Grand Swiss Tournament 2019	Douglas, Isle of Man	Highest Placed Female (Women's Trophy)
2020	FIDE Online Chess Olympiad 2020	Online	Gold Medal
2021	Women's World Team Chess Championship	Sitges	Silver medal
2021	FIDE Online Chess Olympiad 2021	Online	Bronze medal
2022	44th Chess Olympiad	Chennai	Bronze Medal
2024	World Blitz Team Chess Championship	Astana	Team Silver, Individual Gold on Board 6
2024	45th Chess Olympiad	Budapest	Gold Medal
2024	Women's World Rapid Chess Championship	New York	6th (2nd Without tiebreaks)
2025	Women's World Cup	Batumi	Top 8
2026	Grenke Freestyle Chess Open	Grenke	Highest Placed Women
2026	World Rapid Team Chess Championship	Hong Kong	Silver Medal
2026	Asian Women's Rapid Chess Championship	Hong Kong	Gold Medal
2026	Asian Women's Blitz Chess Championship	Hong Kong	Gold Medal

=== National level achievements ===
- 2009 - National Women Chess Championship, Chennai - Gold Medal.
- Won 16 Medals in National Level Tournaments including Women 'A' Championship, Women 'B' Championship, National Junior Girls and Sub-Junior Girls Titles during these 16 years.

Awards and achievements
Preceded by Atousa Pourkashiyan	Women's Asian Chess Champion; 2011	Succeeded by Irine Kharisma Sukandar
