= Candela Francisco =

Argentine chess player (born 2006)

- Candela Francisco in 2026

Personal information
- Born: 14 August 2006 (age 20) Buenos Aires, Argentina

Chess career
- Country: Argentina
- Title: Woman Grandmaster (2023)
- Peak rating: 2352 (June 2023)

Candela Belén Francisco Guecamburu (born 14 August 2006) is an Argentinian chess player who holds the title of Woman Grandmaster (WGM). She is the 2023 World Junior Girls' Champion.

== Chess career ==
She is the reigning women's continental chess champion of the Americas. Francisco has been Argentinian girls' youth champion in the under-12 division in 2017, the under-14 division in 2019, and the under-16 division in 2021. She was runner-up to María Florencia Fernández in the Argentine Women's Chess Championship in 2022.

Francisco was a participant in youth chess training camp hosted at the 2021 World Chess Championship that featured coaching from high-level players including former World Champion Viswanathan Anand. Francisco began playing chess at age six after her parents bought her a chess set for Christmas. She started training in Pilar where she is from at age nine, but later received training at the Círculo de Ajedrez de Villa Martelli, a much higher-level chess club in Vicente López Partido closer to the center of Buenos Aires about 50 kilometres from where her family lived.

In 2023, Francisco participated in the World Junior Girls' Championship, where she was the second seed behind Carissa Yip. She finished equal 1st with Yip and Beloslava Krasteva, and won the title with better tiebreaks due to her last-round win against Krasteva. Her final score was 8.5/11 (+6−0=5). (Note: 6 wins, 0 losses, and 5 draws, including 6 wins against WCM Sofia Mayorga Araya (1825), WFM Manuela Hernandez Bermudez (1905), WIM Svitlana Demchenko (2169), Ingrid Skaslien (1919), WIM Mariam Mkrtchyan (2343), and WGM Beloslava Krasteva (2223), and 5 draws against WIM Zeinep Sultanbek (2022), WIM Lu Miaoyi (2214), WCM Barbara Goraj (2135), WIM Mounika Bommini (2096), and IM Carissa Yip (2372). The numbers in brackets represent the opponent's elo rating.) She is the second World Junior Girls' Champion from South America, after the Peruvian Deysi Cori, and the fourth Under 20 World Champion from Argentina, after Oscar Panno, Carlos Bielicki, and Pablo Zarnicki.
