= Gulrukhbegim Tokhirjonova =

Uzbekistani chess player (born 1999)

- Tokhirjonova at the 46th Chess Olympiad

Personal information
- Born: 16 July 1999 (age 27) Uzbekistan

Chess career
- Country: Uzbekistan; United States (2020-2025)
- Title: International Master (2024); Woman Grandmaster (2016)
- Peak rating: 2446 (January 2019)

Gulrukhbegim Tokhirjonova (Uzbek: Gulruhbegim Toxirjonova; born 16 July 1999) is an Uzbekistani chess player holding the title of International Master (2024).

She played for the United States from 2020 to 2024, and returned to represent Uzbekistan in 2025, She won Bronze Medal at the 2024 Chess Olympiad with the U.S Women's team.

== Career ==
In 2011, Gulrukhbegim Tokhirjonova, who goes by Begim, won the bronze medal at the World Youth Chess Championship in age category U12. In 2015, she won the Asian Girls Championship in age category U20. In 2017, she was second in the Asian Zone 3.4 after Dinara Saduakassova and qualified for the Women's World Chess Championship 2018 (November). In 2018, Gulrukhbegim Tokhirjonova won the Uzbekistan Women Chess Championship.

In 2015, she was awarded the FIDE Woman International Master (WIM) title and received the FIDE Woman Grandmaster (WGM) title a year later. Tokhirjonova played for Uzbekistan in the Women's Chess Olympiads:

- In 2016, at second board in the 42nd Chess Olympiad (women) in Baku (+2, =3, -3),
- In 2018, at first board in the 43rd Chess Olympiad (women) in Batumi (+7, =3, -1).

In the fall of 2019, Tokhirjonova began attending the University of Missouri, where she joined the chess team and studies business with an emphasis in marketing.

Tokhirjonova took silver at the virtual 2020 U.S. Online Collegiate Rapid and Blitz Championships in the women's section; in October 2021, she took the second place at the 2021 U.S. Women's Championship, following Carissa Yip.

In May 2022, she won fourth place at the first American Cup, a double elimination format, after she was eliminated by Irina Krush in the Champion's Bracket, then Tatev Abrahamyan in the Elimination Bracket.

In 2022, She played board 1 for the U.S. team that placed fourth at the 44th Chess Olympiad.

In 2024, She played Board 1 for the United States Women's team that won the Bronze meadal at the 45th Chess Olympiad.

In 2025, Tokhirjonova participated in the Challengers section of UzChess Cup, She finished the tournament on 9th place with (+0-3=6) 3 points, gaining 8 rating points and a performance rating of 2446.

Tokhirjonova participated in Women's World Cup as the 46th seed, She was eliminated in round 2 by 19th seed Lu Miaoyi.

== Personal life ==
Tokhirjonova's two older sisters are also chess players. Her oldest sister Nafisa Muminova was the first Uzbek player to earn the WGM title and her other sister Hulkar Tohirjonova is a Woman FIDE Master (WFM).
