= Marsel Efroimski =

Israeli chess player (born 1995)

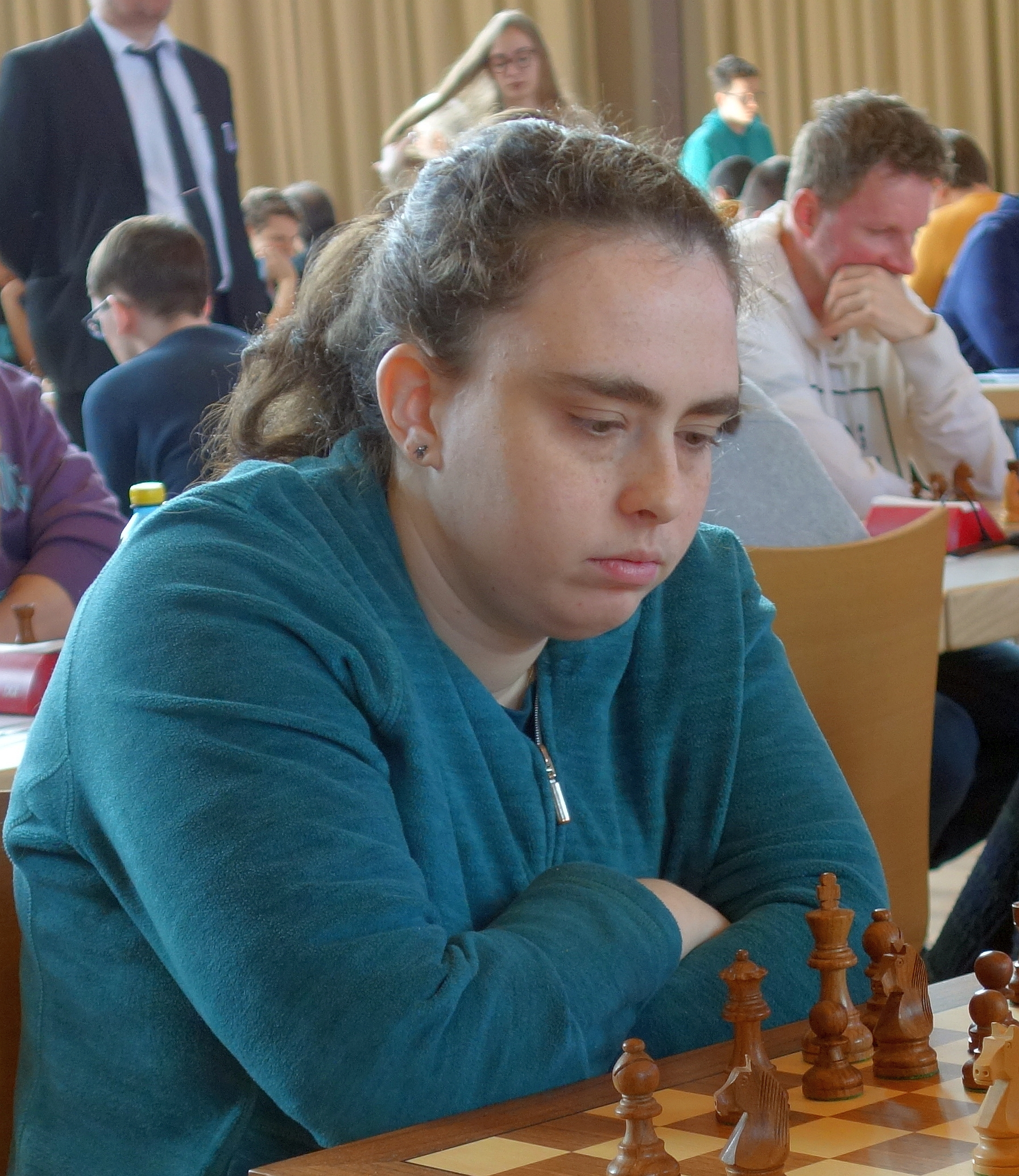
- Efroimski in 2024

Personal information
- Born: February 13, 1995 (age 31)

Chess career
- Country: Israel
- Title: International Master (2021); Woman Grandmaster (2016)
- Peak rating: 2470 (November 2022)

Marsel Efroimski (Hebrew: מרסל אפרוימסקי; born February 13, 1995) is an Israeli chess player. She was awarded the title of International Master (IM) by FIDE in 2021. She is currently (December 2021) the top rated Israeli woman chess player.

== Biography ==
She was introduced to chess by her grandfather in her hometown of Kfar Saba, and has been competing internationally since 2007. Her parents immigrated to Israel from the former Soviet Union.

Efroimski won the World Youth Chess Championship twice, in the Girls Under 12 category at Kemer in 2007 and in the Girls Under 14 at Antalya in 2009, as well as the European Youth Chess Championship in the Girls Under 14 division at Fermo in 2009. At the Girls under-16 European Youth Chess Championship in Albena 2011 Efroimski scored 7 of 9 points and tied for first place with four other players. She was awarded the third prize on tiebreaks.

She represented Israel in the Women's Chess Olympiad at Dresden 2008, at Khanty-Mansiysk 2010, at Istanbul 2012 at Baku 2016, and at Batumi 2018. She was awarded the Woman FIDE Master title in 2008, the Woman International Master title in 2011, and the Woman Grandmaster (WGM) title in 2016.
