= Beloslava Krasteva =

Bulgarian chess player

Personal information
- Born: 2004 (age 21–22)

Chess career
- Country: Bulgaria
- Title: FIDE Master (2019); Woman Grandmaster (2023)
- Peak rating: 2417 (November 2026)

Beloslava Krasteva (Bulgarian: Белослава Кръстева; born 2004) is a Bulgarian chess player who holds the titles of FIDE Master (FM, 2019) and Woman Grandmaster (WGM, 2023). She won the Bulgarian Women's Chess Championship (2020).

== Biography ==
In 2019 Beloslava Krasteva won the Bulgarian Girls Chess Championships in the Under 16 age group. She represented Bulgaria in both the European Youth Chess Championships and the World Youth Chess Championships.

In 2019 Beloslava Krasteva ranked 3rd in Bulgarian Women's Chess Championship. A year later in Sofia, she won this tournament, with 7 points out of 9 rounds.

Beloslava Krasteva played for Bulgaria in the Women's Chess Olympiad:

- In 2022, at third board in the 44th Chess Olympiad (women) in Chennai (+6, =1, -3).

In 2019, she was awarded the FIDE Master (FM) title.
