= Anna Shukhman =

Russian chess player (born 2009)

Personal information
- Born: 6 May 2009 (age 17) Orenburg, Russia

Chess career
- Country: Russia (until 2023); FIDE (since 2023)
- Title: International Master (2026); Woman Grandmaster (2025)
- FIDE rating: 2434 (September 2026)
- Peak rating: 2456 (May 2026)

Anna Aleksandrovna Shukhman (Russian: Анна Александровна Шухман; born 6 May 2009) is a Russian chess player who is one of the highest rated girls in the world as of 2026.

== Early life and career ==
Shukhman was born on 6 May 2009, in Orenburg, Russia.

She won the girls' Under-10 European Youth Chess Championship in 2019, and the women's World Junior Chess Championship in 2025.

In June 2025 she was ranked world no. 3 girl.

In October 2025, she became the Russian champion among adults at the age of 16, becoming the youngest champion in history and breaking the record of Aleksandra Goryachkina.
