= Lela Javakhishvili =

Georgian chess player (born 1984)

- Javakhishvili in 2026

Personal information
- Born: ლელა ჯავახიშვილი April 23, 1984 (age 42) Telavi, Georgian SSR, Soviet Union

Chess career
- Country: Georgia
- Title: International Master (2005); Woman Grandmaster (2003)
- Peak rating: 2500 (March 2010)

Lela Javakhishvili (Georgian: ლელა ჯავახიშვილი; born 23 April 1984) is a Georgian chess player who holds the titles of International master and Woman Grandmaster.

She has won the Georgian women's chess championship twice, and competed in the Women's World Chess Championship four times, most recently in 2012 when she made it to the third round.

== Chess career ==
Javakhishvili has seen considerable success in her career, having reached the titles of International Master in 2005, and Woman Grandmaster in 2003.
