= Song Yuxin =

Chinese chess player (born 2005)

- Song at the 2026 Chess Olympiad

Personal information
- Born: 18 October 2005 (age 21) Beijing, China

Chess career
- Country: China
- Title: International Master (2023); Woman Grandmaster (2023)
- FIDE rating: 2465 (November 2026)
- Peak rating: 2465 (October 2026)

Song Yuxin (Chinese: 宋宇新; born 18 October 2005) is a Chinese chess player who holds the titles of Woman Grandmaster (2023) and International Master (2023). In 2024 she won individual bronze medal in 45th Chess Olympiad (women).

== Biography ==
Song Yuxin has represented her country in the World and Asian Youth Chess Championships. In 2018 she won silver medal in World Youth Chess Championship in girls U14 age group.

Since 2020, Song Yuxin regularly participates in the finals of the Chinese Women's Chess Championships. Her best achievement in this tournaments is 2nd place in 2023.

Song Yuxin played for China in the Women's Chess Olympiad:

- In 2024, at second board in the 45th Chess Olympiad (women) in Budapest (+5, =4, -0) and won individual bronze medal.

In 2019, she was awarded the FIDE Women International Master (WIM) title and received the FIDE Women Grandmaster (WGM) and International Master (IM) titles four years later.
