= Amina Kairbekova =

Kazakh chess player (born 2006)

Personal information
- Born: 19 January 2006 (age 20)

Chess career
- Country: Kazakhstan
- Title: Woman Grandmaster (2025)
- Peak rating: 2379 (February 2026)

Ämina Qaiyrbekova (Note: Often transliterated as Amina Kairbekova through a Russified Romanization of Амина Каирбекова.) (Kazakh: Әмина Асылқызы Қайырбекова; born 19 January 2006) is a Kazakh chess Woman International Master (2022), World Women's Team Chess Championship silver medalist (2023).

== Chess career ==
In 2017 Amina Kairbekova won bronze medal in World Youth Chess Championship in U17 girls age group.

In 2023 Amina Kairbekova finished in 5th place in Asian Women's Chess Championship and in Women's World Chess Championship Asian Zonal tournament. In 2023 she won World School Chess Championship in U17 girls age group.

Amina Kairbekova finished in 4th place in the Kazakhstani Women's Chess Championship in 2022.

Amina Kairbekova played for Kazakhstan in the Women's Chess Olympiad:

- In 2024, at reserve board in the 45th Chess Olympiad (women) in Budapest (+4, =2, -0) and won team silver medal.

Amina Kairbekova played for Kazakhstan in the World Women's Team Chess Championships:

- In 2023, at second reserve board in the 9th Women's World Team Chess Championship in Bydgoszcz (+3, =0, -1) and won team silver medal.

In 2022, she was awarded the FIDE Women International Master (WIM) title.
