= Aleksandra Maltsevskaya =

Russian-Polish chess player (born 2002)

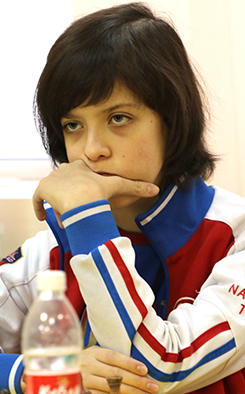

Personal information
- Born: 5 July 2002 (age 24)

Chess career
- Country: Russia (until 2022); Poland (since 2022)
- Title: International Master (2021); Woman Grandmaster (2018)
- Peak rating: 2411 (October 2021)

Aleksandra Maltsevskaya (Russian: Александра Мальцевская, Polish: Aleksandra Malcewska; born 5 July 2002) is a Russian-Polish chess player who holds the FIDE title of International Master (IM).

== Biography ==
Aleksandra Maltsevskaya was a Rostov-on-Don chess school schoolgirl. In 2015, she won the Russian Youth Chess Championship in the U15 Girls age group.

In the 2000s, Maltsevskaya repeatedly represented Russia at the European Youth Chess Championships and World Youth Chess Championships in different age groups, where she won six medals: gold (in 2016, at the European Youth Chess Championship in the U14 girls age group), two silver (in 2015, at the European Youth Chess Championship in the U14 girls age group, and in 2016, at the World Youth Chess Championship in the U14 girls age group) and two bronze (in 2012, at the World Youth Chess Championship in the U10 girls age group, and in 2017, at the World Youth Chess Championship in the U16 girls age group). In 2013, she won silver medal in World School Chess Championship in the U11 girls age group.

In 2018, Maltsevskaya won the World Girls U-20 Championship, held in Gebze, Turkey, and was awarded the FIDE Woman Grandmaster (WGM) title.

In May 2024, in Rzeszów she shared 1st - 2nd place in Polish Women's Chess Championship but lost in play-off to Alina Kashlinskaya - 0,5:1,5 and won silver medal.
