= Yuliia Osmak =

Ukrainian chess player (born 1998)

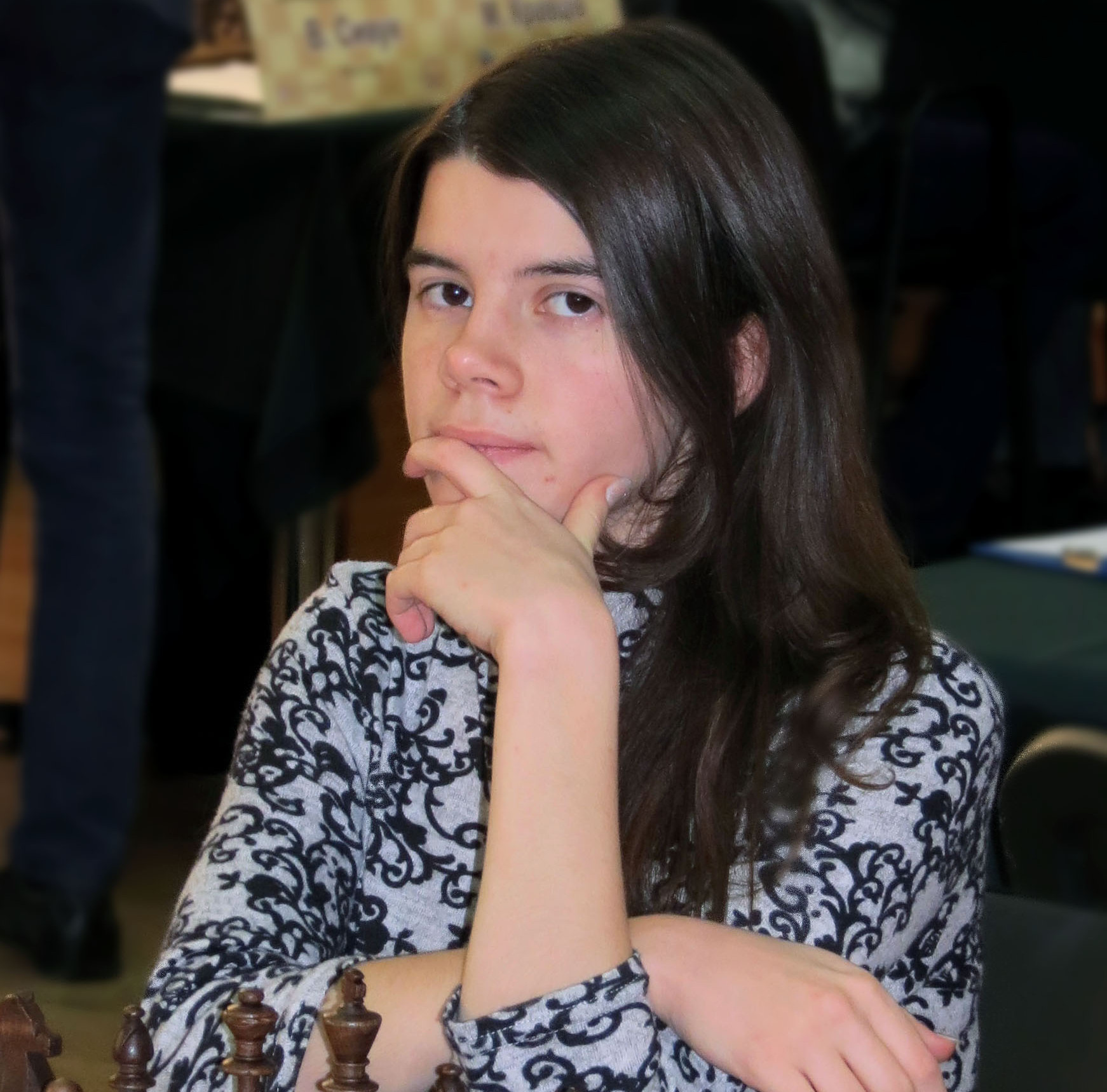
- Osmak in 2015

Personal information
- Born: March 6, 1998 (age 28) Kyiv, Ukraine

Chess career
- Country: Ukraine
- Title: International Master (2017); Woman Grandmaster (2016)
- FIDE rating: 2418 (July 2026)
- Peak rating: 2478 (August 2025)

Yuliia Vladyslavivna Osmak (Ukrainian: Юлія Владиславівна Осьмак) is a Ukrainian chess player who holds the title of Woman grandmaster (WGM, 2016) and International master (IM, 2017). Women's Chess Olympiad winner (2022).

== Biography ==
Osmak won the Ukrainian Girl's Chess Championships several times in different age categories: U10 (2006, 2008), U12 (2010), U16 (2013), U20 (2012, 2013). In 2010, she won the World Youth Chess Championship in the U12 girl's age group. She won silver medals at the European Youth Chess Championships twice: in the U10 girl's age category (2008) and in the U12 girl's age category (2010). At the Ukrainian Women's Chess Championships, Osmak won gold (2017), silver (2019) and four bronze (2014, 2015, 2018, 2020) medals.

In August 2021, Osmak won 2nd place in the European Individual Women's Chess Championship. In November 2021, she ranked 21st overall in the FIDE Women's Grand Swiss Tournament 2021.

Osmak represented the Ukrainian team in major team chess tournaments:

- Participated in the Women's Chess Olympiad three times (2018, 2022, 2024) and won gold in 2022 and silver in 2018;
- Participated in European Women's Team Chess Championship 3 times (2017, 2019, 2021), winning a bronze medal in the 2017 team competition;
- Participated in the World Women's Team Chess Championship twice (2017, and bronze medal 2021).

Osmak was awarded the title of Woman Grandmaster (WGM) in 2016 by FIDE, and in 2017 she achieved the title of International Master (IM).

== Disqualification from the FIDE Universiade tournament ==
On 27 and 28 March 2021, Osmak won with a score of 4.5/5 in the final of the Women's Rapid section of the 1st FIDE World University Online Chess Championship, but her score was changed to 0/5, with Julia Antolak declared the winner. She was disqualified based on a statistical analysis of her five games from the final. The Fair Play Panel of the event say 20 players in total were disqualified but there is no sufficient "proof of actual cheating". Osmak has expressed a willingness to take a lie-detector test to dispute the verdict.
