= Zsóka Gaál =

Hungarian chess player (born 2007)

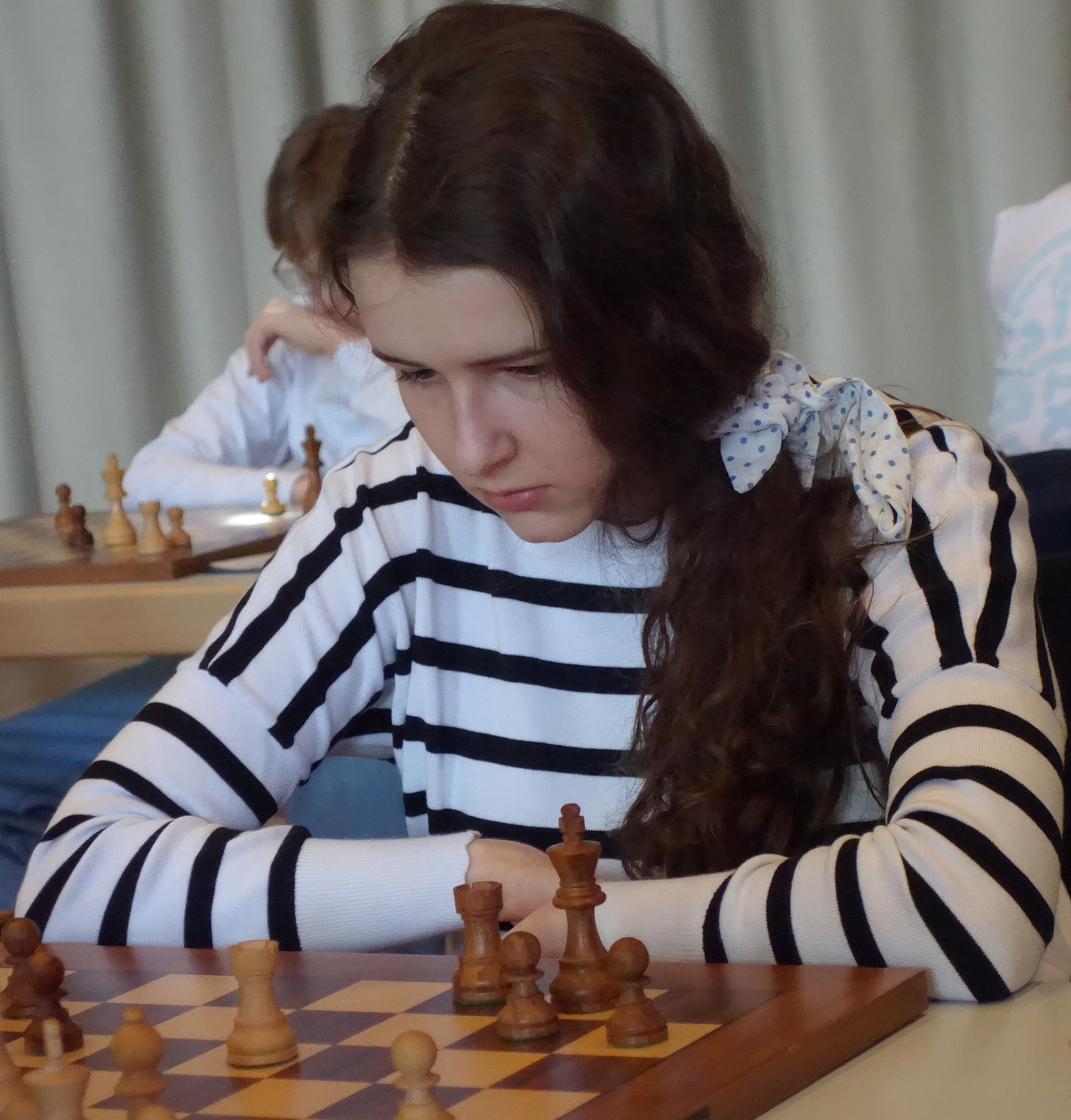
- Gaál in 2024

Personal information
- Born: May 2, 2007 (age 19) Ajka, Hungary

Chess career
- Country: Hungary
- Title: International Master (2025); Woman Grandmaster (2024)
- Peak rating: 2425 (November 2024)

Zsóka Gaál (born 2 May 2007) is a Hungarian chess player who holds the title of Woman Grandmaster. She was the 2021 online World Youth Champion in the under-14 girls' division. She had finished runner-up to Eline Roebers a year earlier. She was also a European Youth Champion in 2016 in the under-10 girls' division. Gaál earned the Woman International Master title in 2021 at 14 years and 2 months old. Her coaches are Gábor Papp and Tamás Bánusz, both of whom hold the title of Grandmaster (GM) and are also from Hungary.
