= Women's World Chess Championship 2018 (November) =

2018 chess tournament in Russia

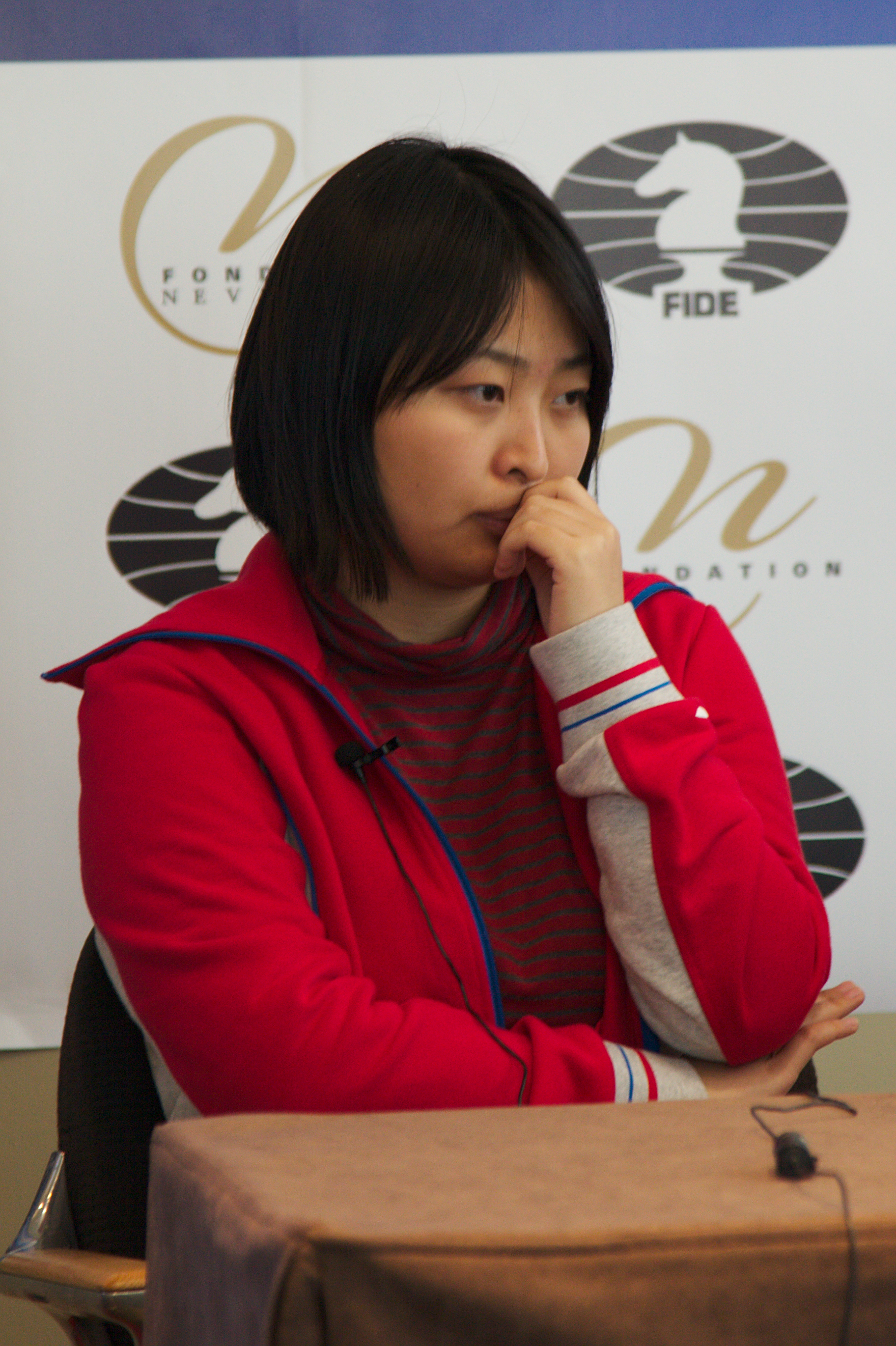
- Ju Wenjun successfully defended her world chess championship title.
- Venue: Yugra Chess Academy
- Location: Khanty-Mansiysk, Russia
- Dates: 2–23 November 2018
- Competitors: 64

Champion
- (China) Ju Wenjun

The Women's World Chess Championship 2018 was a knock-out tournament to crown a new women's world champion in chess. It was the second world championship held in 2018, after Ju Wenjun had defeated Tan Zhongyi to win the title in May 2018. The tournament was played as a 64-player knockout type from 2 to 23 November in Khanty-Mansiysk, Russia.

Ju Wenjun won the tournament, and so retained the Women's World Championship.

The remaining three semi-finalists qualified for the 2019 Candidates Tournament, which decided the challenger for the 2020 World Championship.

== Organization ==
=== Schedule ===
The schedule of the tournament:

- 2 November: Opening ceremony
- 3–5 November: Round 1
- 6–8 November: Round 2
- 9–11 November: Round 3
- 12–14 November: Round 4 (quarter-finals)
- 15–17 November: Round 5 (semi-finals)
- 18 November: Rest day
- 19–23 November: Round 6 (final)
- 23 November: Closing ceremony

=== Prize fund ===
The total prize fund was $450,000.

Round	Players	Prize money (in $)
Winner	1	60,000
Runner-up	1	30,000
Semi-finals	2	20,000
Quarter-finals	4	12,000
Round of 16	8	8,000
Round of 32	16	5,500
Round of 64	32	3,750

=== Regulations ===
The time control was 90 minutes for the first 40 moves, and then 30 minutes for the rest of the game; plus a 30-second increment per move starting from move 1.

In the event of a tie after the regular games, the following tie breaks were used, in order:

1. Two tie-break games at a time limit of 25 minutes plus a 10-second increment per move;
2. Two tie-break games at a time limit of 10 minutes plus a 10-second increment per move;
3. Two tie-break games at a time limit of 5 minutes plus a 3-second increment per move;
4. Armageddon game, at a time limit of 5 minutes for White, and 4 minutes for Black, plus 3 seconds per move from move 61; with White having to win and Black having to draw or win.

== Players ==
The 64 participating players were:

Format is player name, FIDE title, current Elo (October 2018), qualification path (see below). The winner's name is shaded.

1. (China) Ju Wenjun, GM, 2561 (R)
2. (India) Humpy Koneru, GM, 2557 (PN)
3. (Russia) Kateryna Lagno, GM, 2556 (E17)
4. (Ukraine) Anna Muzychuk, GM, 2555 (WC)
5. (Russia) Alexandra Kosteniuk, GM, 2551 (WC)
6. (Russia) Aleksandra Goryachkina, GM, 2536 (E16)
7. (Ukraine) Mariya Muzychuk, GM, 2533 (E17)
8. (China) Tan Zhongyi, GM, 2527 (WC)
9. (Russia) Valentina Gunina, GM, 2525 (R)
10. (Germany) Elisabeth Paehtz, IM, 2513 (E16)
11. (Georgia (country)) Nana Dzagnidze, GM, 2509 (E16)
12. (India) Dronavalli Harika, GM, 2500 (WC)
13. (Bulgaria) Antoaneta Stefanova, GM, 2490 (E16)
14. (Russia) Natalija Pogonina, WGM, 2485 (E17)
15. (Kazakhstan) Zhansaya Abdumalik, IM, 2482 (J17)
16. (Georgia (country)) Nino Batsiashvili, GM, 2482 (PN)
17. (Russia) Olga Girya, WGM, 2479 (R)
18. (China) Zhao Xue, GM, 2478 (R)
19. (Georgia (country)) Lela Javakhishvili, IM, 2475 (E16)
20. (Kazakhstan) Dinara Saduakassova, IM, 2470 (J16)
21. (Georgia (country)) Bela Khotenashvili, GM, 2469 (E16)
22. (China) Lei Tingjie, GM, 2468 (R)
23. (Poland) Monika Socko, GM, 2451 (E17)
24. (Ukraine) Anna Ushenina, GM, 2451 (E16)
25. (Russia) Alina Kashlinskaya, IM, 2447 (E17)
26. (Turkey) Ekaterina Atalik, IM, 2445 (E16)
27. (Russia) Alisa Galliamova, IM, 2432 (E17)
28. (China) Ni Shiqun, WGM, 2427 (Z3.5)
29. (Russia) Anastasia Bodnaruk, IM, 2423 (E16)
30. (Hungary) Hoang Thanh Trang, GM, 2423 (E17)
31. (Poland) Jolanta Zawadzka, WGM, 2421 (E16)
32. (United States) Irina Krush, GM, 2417 (Z2.1)
33. (Ukraine) Inna Gaponenko, IM, 2409 (E17)
34. (Russia) Marina Nechaeva, IM, 2409 (E17)
35. (Armenia) Elina Danielian, GM, 2409 (E17)
36. (Spain) Sabrina Vega, IM, 2404 (E16)
37. (Ukraine) Natalia Zhukova, GM, 2403 (E17)
38. (Kazakhstan) Guliskhan Nakhbayeva, WGM, 2394 (AS17)
39. (Peru) Deysi Cori, WGM, 2391 (AM16)
40. (Uzbekistan) Gulrukhbegim Tokhirjonova, WGM, 2385 (Z3.4)
41. (Armenia) Lilit Mkrtchian, IM, 2384 (E16)
42. (Israel) Yuliya Shvayger, IM, 2375 (E16)
43. (Hungary) Anita Gara, IM, 2370 (E17)
44. (Vietnam) Vo Thi Kim Phung, WGM, 2368 (Z3.3)
45. (Spain) Ana Matnadze, IM, 2362 (E16)
46. (China) Zhu Jin'er, WIM, 2360 (Z3.5)
47. (Argentina) Carolina Luján, IM, 2359 (Z2.5)
48. (China) Zhai Mo, WGM, 2351 (Z3.5)
49. (Scotland) Ketevan Arakhamia-Grant, GM, 2345 (E16)
50. (India) Padmini Rout, IM, 2338 (Z3.7)
51. (India) Bhakti Kulkarni, CM, 2314 (AS16)
52. (United States) Sabina-Francesca Foisor, WGM, 2311 (Z2.1)
53. (Georgia (country)) Sopiko Khukhashvili, IM, 2301 (E16)
54. (Cuba) Yerisbel Miranda Llanes, WIM, 2239 (AM17)
55. (Iran) Mobina Alinasab, WIM, 2205 (Z3.1)
56. (Peru) Ingrid Aliaga Fernández, WIM, 2194 (AM17)
57. (China) Sun Fanghui, WIM, 2183 (Z3.5)
58. (Egypt) Shahenda Wafa, WGM, 2148 (AF)
59. (Canada) Maili-Jade Ouellet, WIM, 2122 (Z2.2)
60. (Puerto Rico) Danitza Vázquez, WIM, 2086 (Z2.3)
61. (Bangladesh) Rani Hamid, WIM, 1909 (Z3.2)
62. (South Africa) Jesse Nikki February, WIM, 1893 (AF)
63. (Algeria) Hayat Toubal, WIM, 1852 (AF)
64. (Australia) Kathryn Hardegen, WFM, 1832 (Z3.6)

=== Qualification paths ===
- WC: Semi-finalists of the Women's World Chess Championship 2017
- J16 and J17: World Junior Champions 2016 and 2017
- R: Rating
- E16 and E17: European Individual Championships 2016 and 2017
- AM16 and AM17: American Continental Chess Championship 2016 and 2017
- AS16 and AS17: Asian Chess Championship 2016 and 2017
- AF: African Chess Championship 2017
- Z2.1, Z2.2, Z2.3, Z2.4, Z2.5, Z3.1, Z3.2, Z3.3, Z3.4, Z3.5, Z3.6, Z3.7: Zonal tournaments
- PN: FIDE President nominee

== Results ==
=== Final match ===
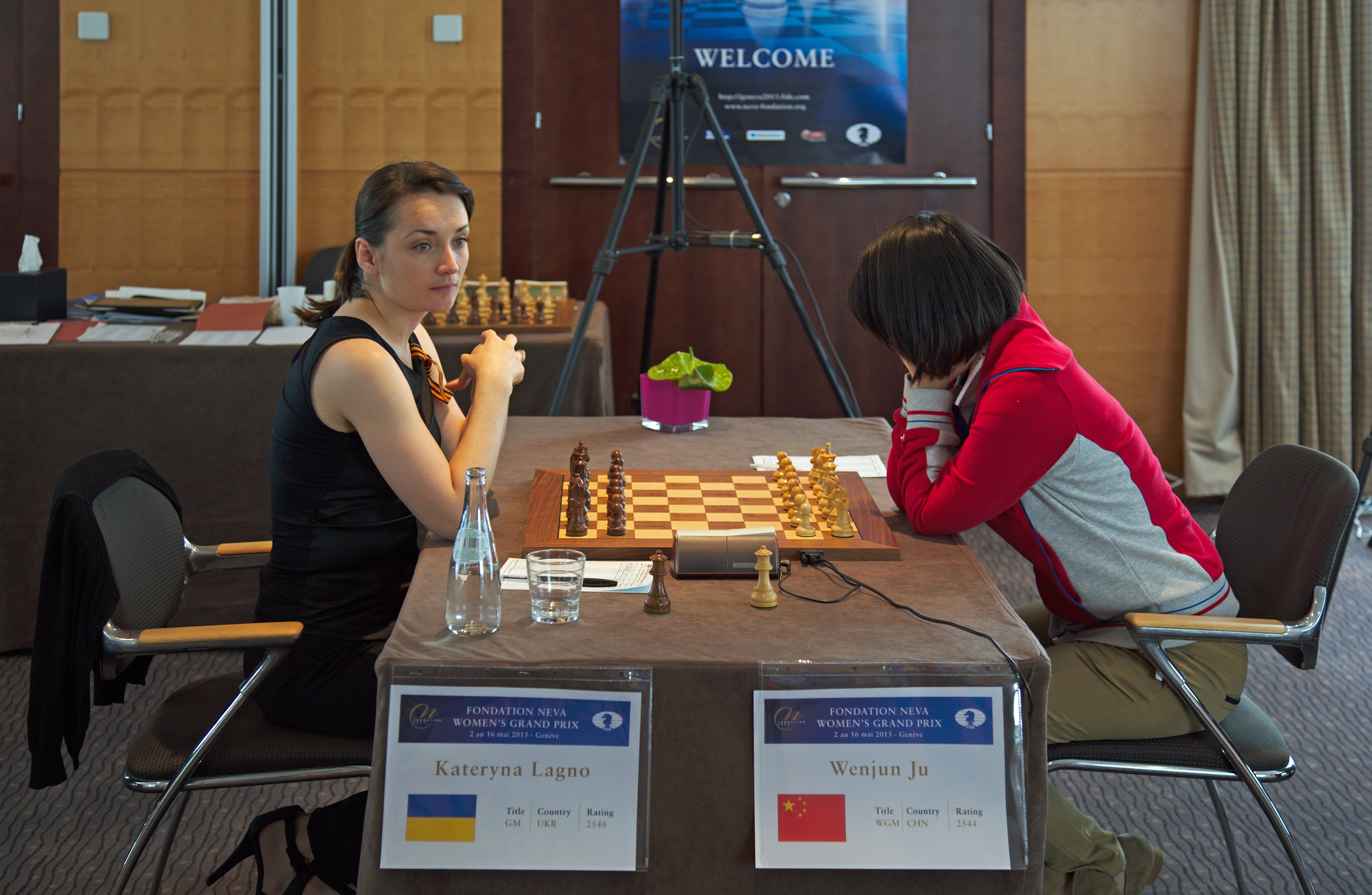
The finalists playing each other at Geneva Grand Prix, 2013

The final is the only match of the tournament which consists of four classical games. Those are played on consecutive days with a rest day between the semi-final tie-breaks and match 1. Eventual tie-breaks are scheduled for 23 November, in the same manner as the whole tournament (two rapid games of 25+10, i.e. 25 minutes for the whole game plus a 10-second increment, the two rapid games of 10+10, two blitz games of 5+3 and an armageddon decider).

Top seed Ju Wenjun, the reigning women's world champion and current women's rapid world champion, advanced to the final without playing a tie-break. Her opponent Kateryna Lagno played three tie-breaks including one armageddon game against Natalia Pogonina in the third round.

Before the final, both had played each other five times at classical time control with all games ending in a draw.

Women's World Chess Championship 2018 Final
			Classical games				Tie-breaks				Total
Seed	Player	Rating (Oct 2018)	1	2	3	4	R1	R2	R3	R4	Total
1	Ju Wenjun (CHN)	2561	½	0	½	1	½	½	1	1	5
3	Kateryna Lagno (RUS)	2556	½	1	½	0	½	½	0	0	3

=== Bracket ===
Player positions were determined by the October FIDE rating list. No. 1 plays no. 64, 2 plays 63, and so on.

==== Finals ====
Quarterfinals
1	Ju Wenjun (CHN)	½	1	1½
40	Gulrukhbegim Tokhirjonova (UZB)	½	0	½
4	Anna Muzychuk (UKR)	½	½	½	1½
5	Alexandra Kosteniuk (RUS)	½	½	1½	2½
15	Zhansaya Abdumalik (KAZ)	1	0	2½	3½
7	Mariya Muzychuk (UKR)	0	1	3½	4½
3	Kateryna Lagno (RUS)	1	1	2
22	Lei Tingjie (CHN)	0	0	0

Semifinals
1	Ju Wenjun (CHN)	1	½	1½
5	Alexandra Kosteniuk (RUS)	0	½	½
7	Mariya Muzychuk (UKR)	½	½	0	1
3	Kateryna Lagno (RUS)	½	½	2	3

Finals
1	Ju Wenjun (CHN)	½	0	½	1	3	5
3	Kateryna Lagno (RUS)	½	1	½	0	1	3

==== Rounds 1-4 ====
1st Round
1	Ju Wenjun (CHN)	2
64	Kathryn Hardegen (AUS)	0
32	Irina Krush (USA)	3
33	Inna Gaponenko (UKR)	1
16	Nino Batsiashvili (GEO)	2
49	Ketevan Arakhamia-Grant (SCO)	0
17	Olga Girya (RUS)	0
48	Zhai Mo (CHN)	2
8	Tan Zhongyi (CHN)	1½
57	Sun Fanghui (CHN)	½
25	Alina Kashlinskaya (RUS)	½
40	Gulrukhbegim Tokhirjonova (UZB)	1½
9	Valentina Gunina (RUS)	1½
56	Ingrid Aliaga Fernández (PER)	½
24	Anna Ushenina (UKR)	1½
41	Lilit Mkrtchian (ARM)	½
4	Anna Muzychuk (UKR)	2
61	Rani Hamid (BAN)	0
29	Anastasia Bodnaruk (RUS)	2½
36	Sabrina Vega (ESP)	1½
13	Antoaneta Stefanova (BUL)	3
52	Sabina-Francesca Foisor (USA)	1
20	Dinara Saduakassova (KAZ)	3
45	Ana Matnadze (ESP)	1
5	Alexandra Kosteniuk (RUS)	2
60	Danitza Vázquez (PUR)	0
28	Ni Shiqun (CHN)	3½
37	Natalia Zhukova (UKR)	2½
12	Harika Dronavalli (IND)	2½
53	Sopiko Khukhashvili (GEO)	1½
21	Bela Khotenashvili (GEO)	1½
44	Võ Thị Kim Phụng (VIE)	½
2	Humpy Koneru (IND)	2
63	Hayat Toubal (ALG)	0
31	Jolanta Zawadzka (POL)	1½
34	Marina Nechaeva (RUS)	½
15	Zhansaya Abdumalik (KAZ)	2½
50	Padmini Rout (IND)	1½
18	Zhao Xue (CHN)	2
47	Carolina Luján (ARG)	0
7	Mariya Muzychuk (UKR)	2
58	Shahenda Wafa (EGY)	0
26	Ekaterina Atalik (TUR)	3
39	Deysi Cori (PER)	1
10	Elisabeth Paehtz (GER)	½
55	Mobina Alinasab (IRI)	1½
23	Monika Socko (POL)	1½
42	Yuliya Shvayger (ISR)	½
3	Kateryna Lagno (RUS)	2
62	Jesse Nikki February (RSA)	0
30	Hoang Thanh Trang (HUN)	2½
35	Elina Danielian (ARM)	1½
14	Natalija Pogonina (RUS)	1½
51	Bhakti Kulkarni (IND)	½
19	Lela Javakhishvili (GEO)	0
46	Zhu Jiner (CHN)	2
6	Aleksandra Goryachkina (RUS)	1½
59	Maili-Jade Ouellet (CAN)	½
27	Alisa Galliamova (RUS)	2½
38	Guliskhan Nakhbayeva (KAZ)	1½
11	Nana Dzagnidze (GEO)	2
54	Yerisbel Miranda Llanes (CUB)	0
22	Lei Tingjie (CHN)	3
43	Anita Gara (HUN)	1

2nd Round
1	Ju Wenjun (CHN)	1½
32	Irina Krush (USA)	½
16	Nino Batsiashvili (GEO)	0
48	Zhai Mo (CHN)	2
8	Tan Zhongyi (CHN)	1½
40	Gulrukhbegim Tokhirjonova (UZB)	2½
9	Valentina Gunina (RUS)	1½
24	Anna Ushenina (UKR)	½
4	Anna Muzychuk (UKR)	2
29	Anastasia Bodnaruk (RUS)	0
13	Antoaneta Stefanova (BUL)	2½
20	Dinara Saduakassova (KAZ)	1½
5	Alexandra Kosteniuk (RUS)	3
28	Ni Shiqun (CHN)	1
12	Harika Dronavalli (IND)	2½
21	Bela Khotenashvili (GEO)	1½
2	Humpy Koneru (IND)	½
31	Jolanta Zawadzka (POL)	1½
15	Zhansaya Abdumalik (KAZ)	3
18	Zhao Xue (CHN)	1
7	Mariya Muzychuk (UKR)	2½
26	Ekaterina Atalik (TUR)	1½
55	Mobina Alinasab (IRI)	2
23	Monika Socko (POL)	0
3	Kateryna Lagno (RUS)	3
30	Hoang Thanh Trang (HUN)	1
14	Natalija Pogonina (RUS)	4
46	Zhu Jiner (CHN)	2
6	Aleksandra Goryachkina (RUS)	0
27	Alisa Galliamova (RUS)	2
11	Nana Dzagnidze (GEO)	½
22	Lei Tingjie (CHN)	1½

3rd Round
1	Ju Wenjun (CHN)	1½
48	Zhai Mo (CHN)	½
40	Gulrukhbegim Tokhirjonova (UZB)	3
9	Valentina Gunina (RUS)	1
4	Anna Muzychuk (UKR)	2½
13	Antoaneta Stefanova (BUL)	1½
5	Alexandra Kosteniuk (RUS)	3½
12	Harika Dronavalli (IND)	2½
31	Jolanta Zawadzka (POL)	1½
15	Zhansaya Abdumalik (KAZ)	2½
7	Mariya Muzychuk (UKR)	1½
55	Mobina Alinasab (IRI)	½
3	Kateryna Lagno (RUS)	5
14	Natalija Pogonina (RUS)	4
27	Alisa Galliamova (RUS)	1
22	Lei Tingjie (CHN)	3

Quarterfinals
1	Ju Wenjun (CHN)	1½
40	Gulrukhbegim Tokhirjonova (UZB)	½
4	Anna Muzychuk (UKR)	1½
5	Alexandra Kosteniuk (RUS)	2½
15	Zhansaya Abdumalik (KAZ)	3½
7	Mariya Muzychuk (UKR)	4½
3	Kateryna Lagno (RUS)	2
22	Lei Tingjie (CHN)	0
