= Sun Fanghui =

Chinese chess player (born 1993)

Personal information
- Born: 1993 (age 32–33)

Chess career
- Country: China
- Title: Woman International Master (2018)
- Peak rating: 2228 (July 2023)

Sun Fanghui (Chinese: 孙方卉; pinyin: Sūn Fānghuì; born 1993), is a Chinese chess player who holds the title of Woman International Master.

In 2017, Sun Fanghui placed fourth in the Women's World Chess Championship Asian Zone 3.5 tournament after Zhai Mo, Ni Shiqun, and Zhu Jiner, which qualified her for the Women's World Chess Championship 2018 (November). In 2017, she was awarded the FIDE Woman International Master (WIM) title.
