= Hardegen =

Hardegen is a German surname. Notable people with the surname include:

- Kathryn Hardegen (born 1983), Australian chess player
- Reinhard Hardegen (1913–2018), German military officer

== See also ==
- Hardegsen
