= Ayelén =

Ayelén is a feminine given name.

== People ==
- Ayelen Acuña (born 2002), Argentine footballer
- Ayelen Beker (born 1989), Argentine singer and trans rights activist
- Ayelén García (born 1999), Argentine handball player
- Ayelén Martínez (born 1993), Argentine chess player
- Ayelén Mazzina (born 1989), Argentine political scientist and politician
- Ayelén Stepnik (born 1975), Argentine field hockey player
- Ayelén Tarabini (born 1992), Argentine artistic gymnast

== See also ==
- Ailen Pucheta (born 1999), Argentine footballer
- Antonela Ayelen Curatola (born 1991), Argentine volleyball player
