= Krivonosov =

Krivonosov (Russian: Кривоносов, from кривой нос meaning crooked nose) is a Russian masculine surname, its feminine counterpart is Krivonosova. It may refer to

- Elena Krivonosova (born 1972), Ukrainian volleyball player
- Mikhail Krivonosov (1929–1995), Soviet hammer thrower
- Oleg Krivonosov (born 1961), Latvian chess player
- Sergey Krivonosov (born 1971), Russian politician
