= Olga Zimina =

Italian chess player

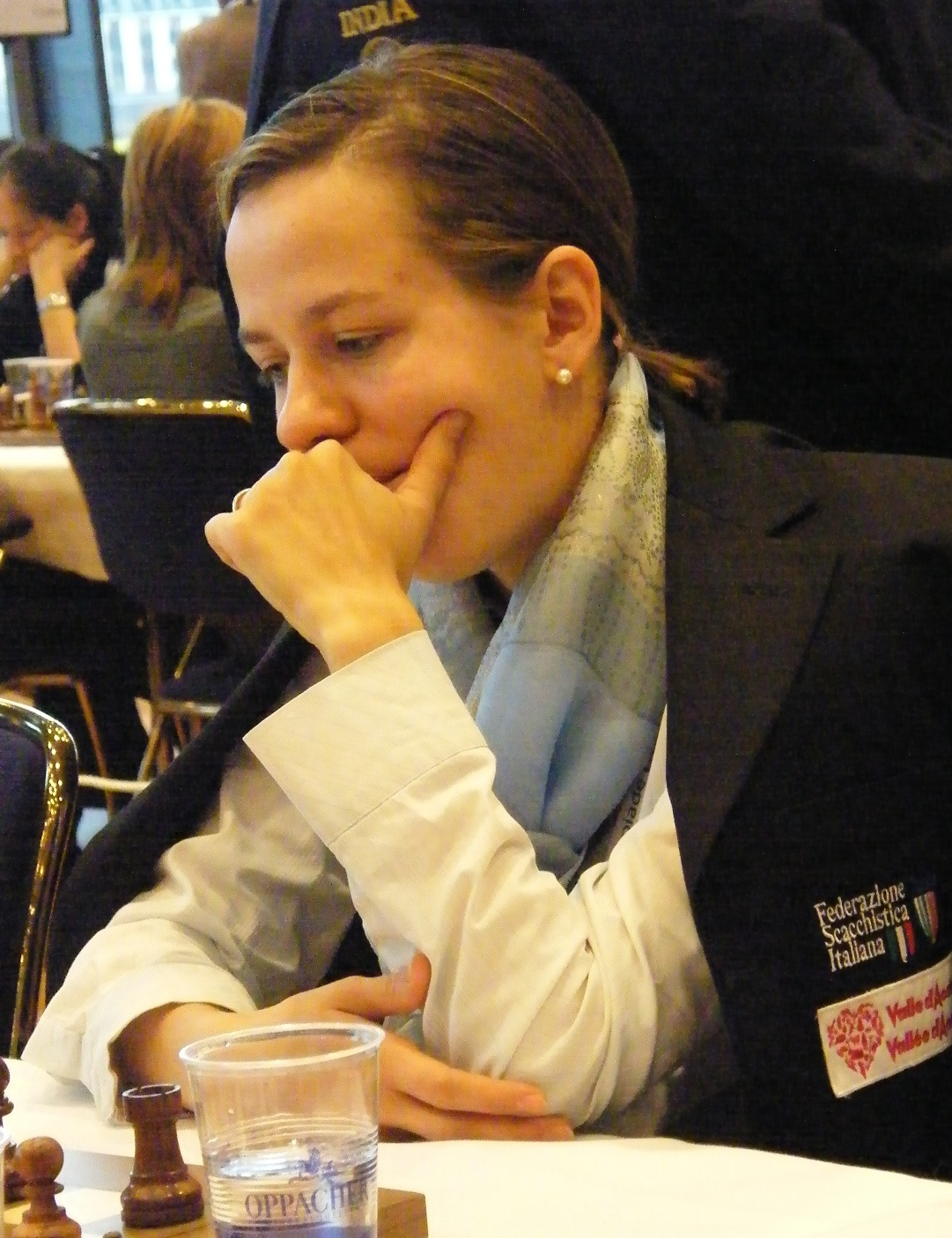
- Olga Zimina in 2008

Personal information
- Born: 14 May 1982 (age 44) Vladimir, Russia

Chess career
- Country: Italy
- Title: International Master (2008); Woman Grandmaster (2003)
- Peak rating: 2431 (October 2018)

Olga Zimina (Russian: Ольга Анатольевна Зимина, born 14 May 1982 in Vladimir, Russia) is a Russian-born Italian chess player. She holds the titles of woman grandmaster, and international master. She won the Women's Russian Chess Championship in 2001, and qualified for the Women's World Chess Championship 2016 (knock-out) as the winner of a zonal.
