= Nancy Lane =

Australian chess player (born 1971)

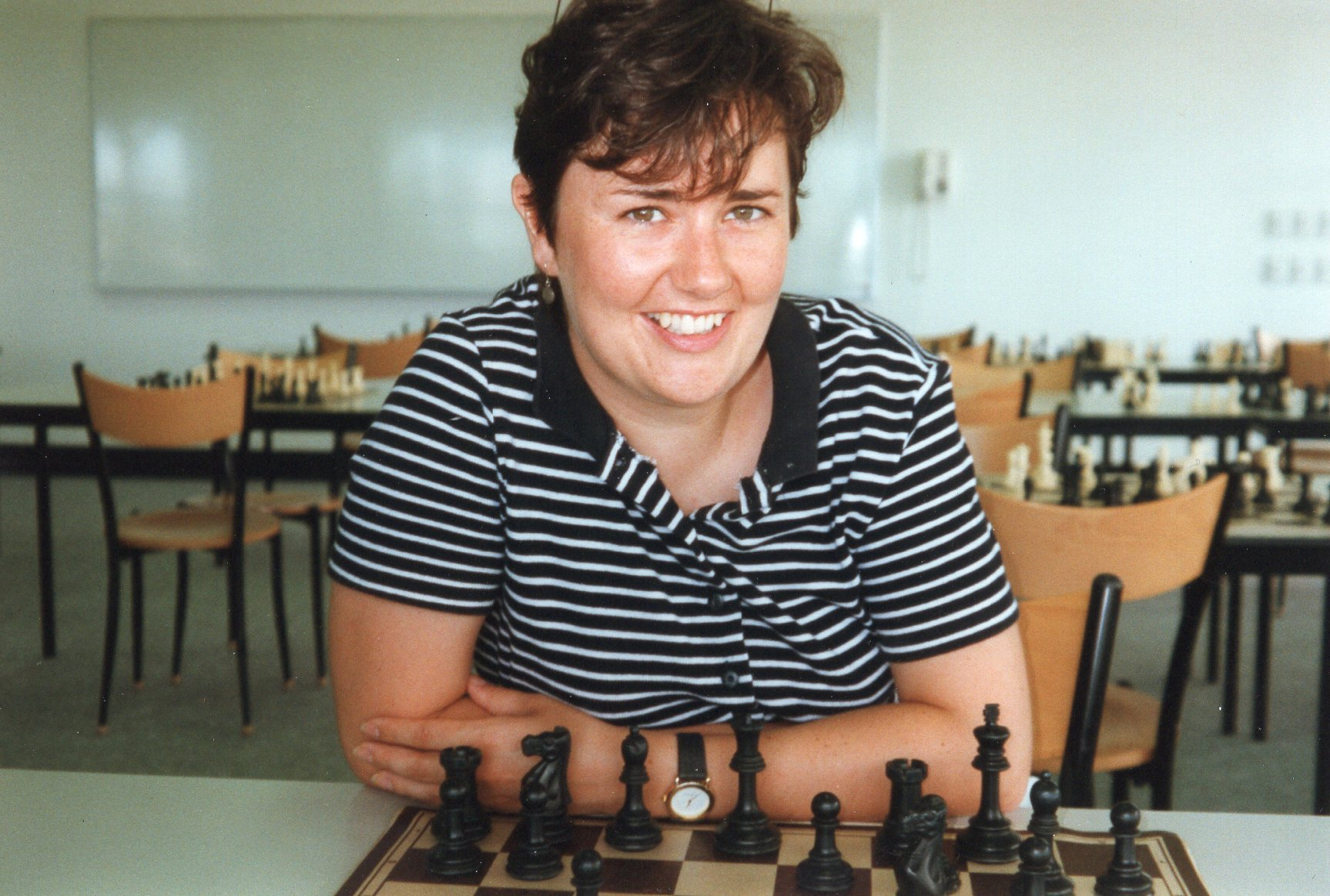

Personal information
- Born: 1971 (age 54–55)
- Spouse: Gary Lane

Chess career
- Country: Australia
- Title: Woman International Master (2003)
- Peak rating: 1985 (April 2003)

Nancy Lane (née Jones) (born 1971) is an Australian chess player. She has twice won the Girls' Australian Chess Championship (1988 and 1989). She also won the 1988 and 1989 New South Wales Women's Championship. She was granted her Women's International Master (WIM) Title in 2005, following her second place in the 2002 World Zonal tournament in Fiji. She played in the Women's World Chess Championship 2017 in Tehran but went out in the first round to World Champion Ju Wenjun. In 2019 Nancy was awarded the Ladies International Master (LIM) title by the International Correspondence Chess Federation.

== Personal life ==
She is married to International Master Gary Lane.
