= Women's World Chess Championship 2017 =

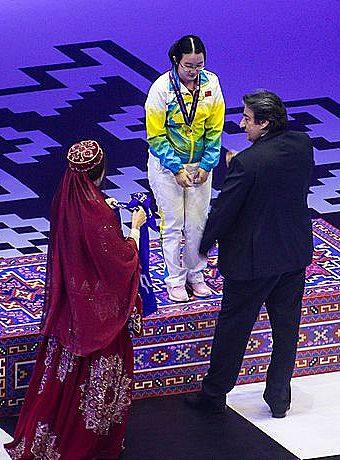
- Tan Zhongyi at the 2016 Chess Olympiad.
- Location: Tehran, Iran
- Dates: 10 February – 4 March 2017
- Competitors: 64

Champion
- (China) Tan Zhongyi

The Women's World Chess Championship 2017 was a 64-player knock-out tournament, to decide the women's world chess champion. The final was won by Tan Zhongyi over Anna Muzychuk in the rapid tie-breaks.

At the FIDE General Assembly during the 42nd Chess Olympiad in Baku in September 2016, the organizational rights to the event were awarded to Iran, who held the Championship in Tehran from 10 February to 4 March 2017.

Some top female players decided not to attend the tournament. Hou Yifan, the outgoing women's world champion and top ranked female player, decided not to enter the tournament because of dissatisfaction with FIDE's Women's World Championship system. The 2015 Women's World Champion, Mariya Muzychuk, and US Women's Champion Nazí Paikidze also elected not to attend, out of protest at the tournament's location in Iran, where it is mandatory for all women to wear a hijab in public (a rule which also applied to the participating players). Other notable absentees were women's world number four Humpy Koneru and eight-time US Women's Champion Irina Krush.

On 12 May 2017 FIDE suspended the Chess Federation of Iran for non-payment of Women's World Championship prizes. On 2 June 2017, the ban was lifted.

== Hosting ==
The tournament was originally placed on the FIDE calendar for October 2016. However, the March 2016 meeting of the FIDE Presidential Board ultimately postponed the event to 2017 due to the lack of an organizer.

The original agenda for the General Assembly made no explicit mention of Iran, only indicating that the event had been postponed until 2017 due to the lack of an organizer, similar to the situations in 2014 and 2015. When the agenda item (5.20.7) for Women's World Championship came up for discussion in Baku, Iran offered to host the event, and after a brief discussion of the applicable dress code, none of the 159 attending delegates objected. Only when FIDE published the General Assembly decisions two weeks later did the existence of the Iran offer become widely known, and the issue rapidly became explosive, in part due to the social media activity of Nigel Short, who alternatively claimed that awarding the event to Iran was against FIDE Statutes or the Code of Ethics (or founding Principles) of the International Olympic Committee.

Nazí Paikidze, who qualified by finishing tied for 2nd in the 2015 US Women's Championship, was the first female player to protest FIDE's decision to allow Iran to host the event. Through the media she announced that she would not participate most particularly because of Iran's dress code requiring women to wear a hijab, though initially she also secondarily mentioned the risks to Americans and other foreigners of being detained in Iran because of their nationality. In a later petition on Change.org she included a third item, namely that there could be speech restrictions on women.

Chess, like other sports, has had a degree of controversy regarding women's attire. A statement from FIDE Press Officer Anastasiya Karlovich was published at Susan Polgar's site Chess Daily News on October 1, 2016, indicating that FIDE has not received any official complaints to date (including from prior women's events held in Iran), but that they would be reviewing all possible solutions for the players’ comfort and would discuss all the issues with the organizers in Iran during meetings in the next few weeks. Polgar requested that concerned participants contact the FIDE Women's Commission, of which she is co-chair.

Emil Sutovsky, the president of the Association of Chess Professionals (ACP), hosted discussions at his Facebook page on the matter, and wrote an official letter to FIDE. He also noted that while he has talked to at least half the participants and the vast majority do not want to boycott, the ACP would respect the rights of others too. Natalia Zhukova, Alexandra Kosteniuk, Anna Muzychuk, and Elisabeth Paehtz have all made public comments to Sutovsky, but none to the degree of Nazí Paikidze. Sutovsky was willing to entertain Nigel Short's claims regarding the illegality of FIDE's actions, but simultaneously would not pursue them (either personally or as ACP president) until a proper legal argument was made on the matter.

ChessBase India interviewed two of the three qualifiers from that country (Harika Dronavalli and Humpy Koneru), each of whom has played in Iran previously. They indicated a degree of awkwardness and discomfort with the physical aspects of the headscarf while playing (as had Zhukova), but declared the World Championship itself to be more important. Later articles quoted Kosteniuk and Koneru expanding on their views, with the former noting that even exercising for fitness in Iran can be difficult for a woman.

The Guardian featured 2015 Asian Women's Continental Champion Mitra Hejazipour (of Iran) in an article, describing how a boycott could harm Iranian women's sport. Other Iranian players have also stated that a boycott would not be beneficial to Iranian women.

== Schedule ==
The schedule of the tournament:

- 10 February: Opening ceremony
- 11–13 February: Round 1
- 14–16 February: Round 2
- 17–19 February: Round 3
- 20–22 February: Round 4 (quarter-finals)
- 23–25 February: Round 5 (semi-finals)
- 26 February: Rest day
- 27 February – 3 March: Round 6 (final)
- 4 March: Closing ceremony

== Participants ==
The players are selected by five different means: reaching the semi-finals of the most recent knock-out Women's World Championship, junior championships, rating, zonal or continental chess championships, and FIDE wildcards.

Before the start of the tournament, 48th seed Cristina Adela Foișor died. Because pairings were already announced, there was no replacement.

The participants, seeded by their FIDE rating of February 2017, are:

1. (China) Ju Wenjun, GM (R)
2. (Ukraine) Anna Muzychuk, GM (R)
3. (Russia) Alexandra Kosteniuk, GM (R)
4. (India) Harika Dronavalli, GM (WC)
5. (Georgia (country)) Nana Dzagnidze, GM (E14)
6. (Russia) Valentina Gunina, GM (E14)
7. (Bulgaria) Antoaneta Stefanova, GM (E14)
8. (China) Zhao Xue, GM (R)
9. (China) Tan Zhongyi, WGM (Z3.5)
10. (Georgia (country)) Nino Batsiashvili, IM (E14)
11. (Russia) Natalia Pogonina, WGM (WC)
12. (China) Shen Yang, IM (R)
13. (Hungary) Hoang Thanh Trang, GM (E15)
14. (Germany) Elisabeth Paehtz, IM (E15)
15. (Russia) Aleksandra Goryachkina, WGM (J14)
16. (Russia) Anastasia Bodnaruk, IM (E14)
17. (Russia) Olga Girya, WGM (E15)
18. (Georgia (country)) Lela Javakhishvili, IM (E14)
19. (Sweden) Pia Cramling, GM (WC)
20. (Iran) Sarasadat Khademalsharieh, IM (PN)
21. (Poland) Monika Soćko, GM (E14)
22. (China) Huang Qian, WGM (Z3.5)
23. (Ukraine) Natalia Zhukova, GM (E14)
24. (Ukraine) Anna Ushenina, GM (R)
25. (Armenia) Elina Danielian, GM (E14)
26. (Turkey) Ekaterina Atalik, IM (E15)
27. (Armenia) Lilit Mkrtchian, IM (E14)
28. (Georgia (country)) Bela Khotenashvili, IM (E15)
29. (Kazakhstan) Dinara Saduakassova, IM (Z3.4)
30. (Russia) Ekaterina Kovalevskaya, IM (E15)
31. (Peru) Deysi Cori, WGM (Z2.4)
32. (Indonesia) Irine Kharisma Sukandar, IM (AS14)
33. (Qatar) Zhu Chen, GM (Z3.1)
34. (Russia) Alina Kashlinskaya, IM (E14)
35. (Ukraine) Inna Gaponenko, IM (E15)
36. (Russia) Marina Nechaeva, IM (E15)
37. (Italy) Olga Zimina, IM (E15)
38. (China) Ni Shiqun, WGM (Z3.5)
39. (Georgia (country)) Salome Melia, IM (E14)
40. (India) Padmini Rout, IM (Z3.7)
41. (Belarus) Nastassia Ziaziulkina, IM (E15)
42. (Georgia (country)) Nino Khurtsidze, IM (E14)
43. (Russia) Daria Charochkina, IM (E15)
44. (Russia) Anastasia Savina, IM (E15)
45. (Georgia (country)) Sopiko Guramishvili, IM (E15)
46. (United States) Kateřina Němcová, WGM (Z2.1)
47. (Vietnam) Pham Le Thao Nguyen, IM (Z3.3)
48. (Romania) ~~Cristina-Adela Foisor, IM~~ (E14)
49. (Iran) Mitra Hejazipour, WGM (AS15)
50. (China) Zhai Mo, WGM (Z3.5)
51. (Iran) Atousa Pourkashiyan, WGM (PN)
52. (Ukraine) Nataliya Buksa, WGM (J15)
53. (Cuba) Maritza Arribas Robaina, WGM (AM)
54. (Canada) Qiyu Zhou, WGM (Z2.2)
55. (Georgia (country)) Sopio Gvetadze, IM (E14)
56. (United States) Sabina Foisor, WGM (Z2.1)
57. (Argentina) Ayelén Martínez, WIM (Z2.5)
58. (Cuba) Yaniet Marrero Lopez, WGM (Z2.3)
59. (United States) Viktorija Ni, WIM (Z2.1)
60. (Egypt) Khaled Mona, WGM (AF)
61. (Bangladesh) Akter Liza Shamima, WIM (Z3.2)
62. (Algeria) Sabrina Latreche, WIM (AF)
63. (Algeria) Amina Mezioud, WIM (AF)
64. (Australia) Nancy Lane, WIM (Z3.6)

=== Qualification paths ===
- WC: Semi-finalists of the Women's World Chess Championship 2015
- J14 and J15: World Junior Champions 2014 and 2015
- R: Rating (average of all published ratings from February 2015 to January 2016 was used) (6)
- E14 and E15: European Individual Championships 2014 and 2015 (28)
- AM: American Continental Chess Championship 2016
- AS14 and AS15: Asian Chess Championships 2014 and 2015
- AF: African Chess Championship 2016 (3)
- Z2.1 (3), Z2.2, Z2.3, Z2.4, Z2.5, Z3.1, Z3.2, Z3.3, Z3.4, Z3.5 (4), Z3.6, Z3.7: Zonal tournaments
- PN: FIDE President nominee (2)

== Prize money ==
The prize money is US$3,750 for first round losers, $5,500 for second, $8,000 for third, $12,000 for fourth, $20,000 for losing semifinalists, $30,000 for runner-up, and $60,000 for champion ($450,000 overall), with 20% of such sums being taken by FIDE. All players pay their own costs (travel, accommodation and meals) for the duration.

== Final match ==
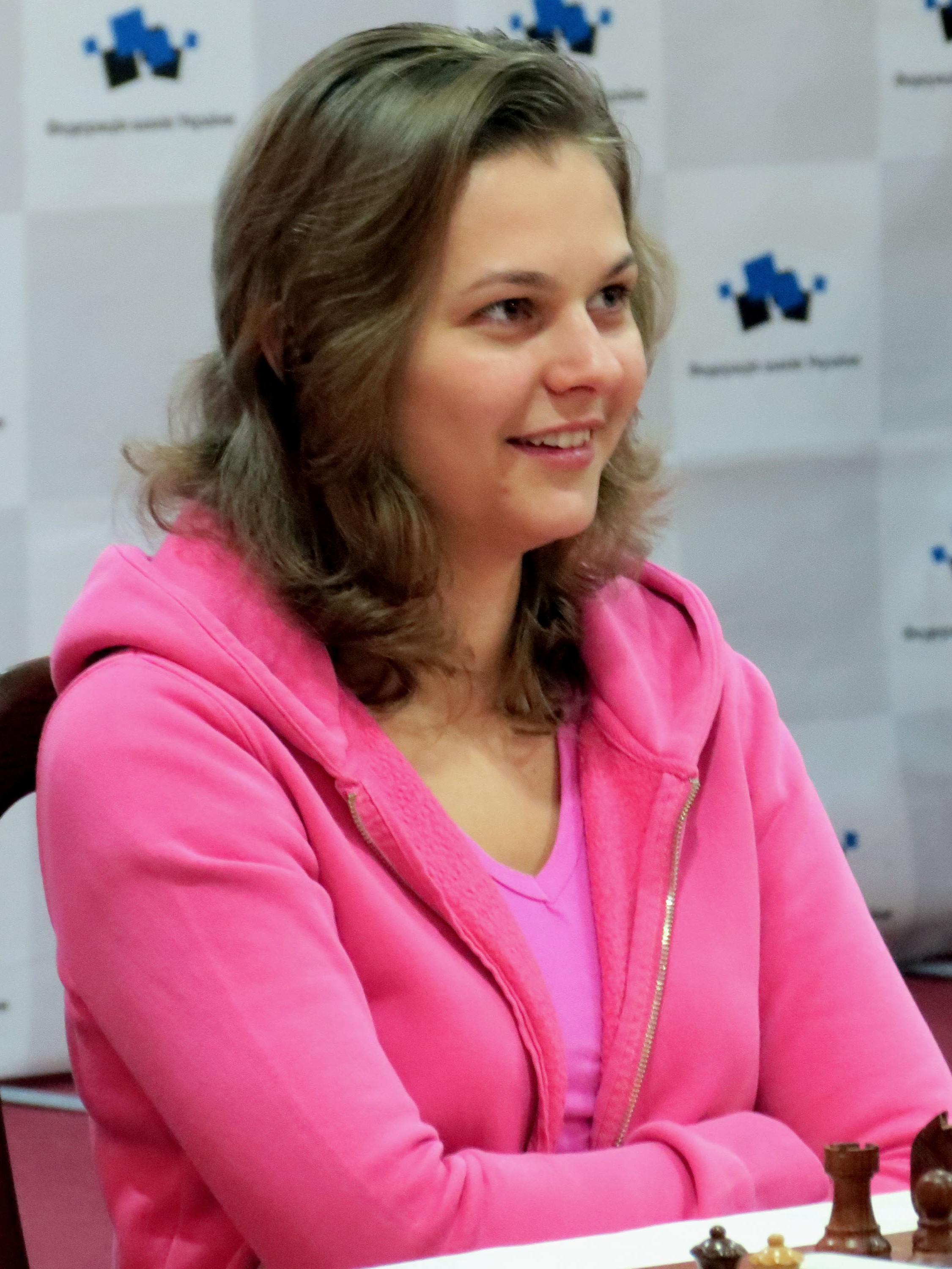
Muzychuk reached the final without playing a single tie-break.

The final was the only match of the tournament which consisted of four classical games. Those were played on consecutive days with a rest-day between the semi-final tie-breaks and match 1. Eventual tie-breaks were played on 3 March 2017, in the same manner as the whole tournament. Two rapid games of 25+10 (i.e. 25 minutes for the whole game plus a 10-second increment), the two rapid games of 10+10, two blitz games of 5+3 and an armageddon decider.

Anna Muzychuk, the reigning women's blitz and rapid world champion, had advanced to the final without playing a tie-break. Tan Zhongyi on the other hand played several, including two armageddon matches. One of those was in the semi-final against Harika Dronavalli, who had been knocked out at the semi-final stage for the third straight time. Before the finals, Tan Zhongyi and Anna Muzychuk had met each other just two times at classical time control, with both games ending in a draw.

After a draw in the first game, Tan outplayed her opponent to win game 2. However, Muzychuk came back with a crushing early victory in game 3. Game 4 was a quiet draw, setting the stage for a rapid playoff. In the first pair of rapid games, Tan Zhongyi won the title. Consequently, she was also awarded the Grandmaster title.

Women's World Chess Championship Final 2017
		Classical games				Tie-breaks		Total
	Rating	1	2	3	4	R1	R2	Total
Tan Zhongyi (CHN)	2502	½	1	0	½	½	1	3½
Anna Muzychuk (UKR)	2558	½	0	1	½	½	0	2½

== Bracket ==
Player positions are determined by the January FIDE rating list. No. 1 plays no. 64, 2 plays 63, and so on.

=== Finals ===
Quarterfinals
1	(China) Ju Wenjun	½	0	½
9	(China) Tan Zhongyi	½	1	1½
4	(India) Harika Dronavalli	1	0	1½	2½
5	(Georgia (country)) Nana Dzagnidze	0	1	½	1½
2	(Ukraine) Anna Muzychuk	1	½	1½
7	(Bulgaria) Antoaneta Stefanova	0	½	½
3	(Russia) Alexandra Kosteniuk	½	1	1½
38	(China) Ni Shiqun	½	0	½

Semifinals
9	(China) Tan Zhongyi	1	0	4	5
4	(India) Harika Dronavalli	0	1	3	4
2	(Ukraine) Anna Muzychuk	1	1	2
3	(Russia) Alexandra Kosteniuk	0	0	0

Finals
9	(China) Tan Zhongyi	½	1	0	½	1½	3½
4	(Ukraine) Anna Muzychuk	½	0	1	½	½	2½

=== Rounds 1-4 ===
1st Round
1	(China) Ju Wenjun	2
64	(Australia) Nancy Lane	0
32	(Indonesia) Irine Kharisma Sukandar	½
33	(Qatar) Zhu Chen	1½
16	(Russia) Anastasia Bodnaruk	5
49	(Iran) Mitra Hejazipour	4
17	(Russia) Olga Girya	w/o
48	(Romania) Cristina-Adela Foisor
8	(China) Zhao Xue	3
57	(Argentina) Ayelén Martínez	1
25	(Armenia) Elina Danielian	½
40	(India) Padmini Rout	1½
9	(China) Tan Zhongyi	1½
56	(United States) Sabina Foisor	½
24	(Ukraine) Anna Ushenina	1½
41	(Belarus) Nastassia Ziaziulkina	½
4	(India) Harika Dronavalli	2½
61	(Bangladesh) Akter Liza Shamima	1½
29	(Kazakhstan) Dinara Saduakassova	1½
36	(Russia) Marina Nechaeva	½
13	(Hungary) Hoang Thanh Trang	1½
52	(Ukraine) Nataliya Buksa	2½
20	(Iran) Sarasadat Khademalsharieh	1½
45	(Georgia (country)) Sopiko Guramishvili	2½
5	(Georgia (country)) Nana Dzagnidze	4
60	(Egypt) Khaled Mona	2
28	(Georgia (country)) Bela Khotenashvili	1
37	(Italy) Olga Zimina	3
12	(China) Shen Yang	3
53	(Cuba) Maritza Arribas Robaina	1
21	(Poland) Monika Soćko	1½
44	(Russia) Anastasia Savina	2½
2	(Ukraine) Anna Muzychuk	2
63	(Algeria) Amina Mezioud	0
31	(Peru) Deysi Cori	½
34	(Russia) Alina Kashlinskaya	1½
15	(Russia) Aleksandra Goryachkina	1½
50	(China) Zhai Mo	½
18	(Georgia (country)) Lela Javakhishvili	½
47	(Vietnam) Pham Le Thao Nguyen	1½
7	(Bulgaria) Antoaneta Stefanova	2
58	(Cuba) Yaniet Marrero Lopez	0
26	(Turkey) Ekaterina Atalik	1½
39	(Georgia (country)) Salome Melia	2½
10	(Georgia (country)) Nino Batsiashvili	2
55	(Georgia (country)) Sopio Gvetadze	0
23	(Ukraine) Natalia Zhukova	½
42	(Georgia (country)) Nino Khurtsidze	1½
3	(Russia) Alexandra Kosteniuk	2
62	(Algeria) Sabrina Latreche	0
30	(Russia) Ekaterina Kovalevskaya	½
35	(Ukraine) Inna Gaponenko	1½
14	(Germany) Elisabeth Paehtz	1½
51	(Iran) Atousa Pourkashiyan	½
19	(Sweden) Pia Cramling	1½
46	(United States) Kateřina Němcová	½
6	(Russia) Valentina Gunina	2
59	(United States) Viktorija Ni	0
27	(Armenia) Lilit Mkrtchian	½
38	(China) Ni Shiqun	1½
11	(Russia) Natalia Pogonina	1½
54	(Canada) Qiyu Zhou	½
22	(China) Huang Qian	3
43	(Russia) Daria Charochkina	1

2nd Round
1	(China) Ju Wenjun	1½
33	(Qatar) Zhu Chen	½
16	(Russia) Anastasia Bodnaruk	0
17	(Russia) Olga Girya	2
8	(China) Zhao Xue	1½
40	(India) Padmini Rout	2½
9	(China) Tan Zhongyi	4½
24	(Ukraine) Anna Ushenina	4½
4	(India) Harika Dronavalli	2½
29	(Kazakhstan) Dinara Saduakassova	1½
52	(Ukraine) Nataliya Buksa	3½
45	(Georgia (country)) Sopiko Guramishvili	4½
5	(Georgia (country)) Nana Dzagnidze	2
37	(Italy) Olga Zimina	0
12	(China) Shen Yang	1½
44	(Russia) Anastasia Savina	½
2	(Ukraine) Anna Muzychuk	1½
34	(Russia) Alina Kashlinskaya	½
15	(Russia) Aleksandra Goryachkina	½
47	(Vietnam) Pham Le Thao Nguyen	1½
7	(Bulgaria) Antoaneta Stefanova	2½
39	(Georgia (country)) Salome Melia	1½
10	(Georgia (country)) Nino Batsiashvili	4
42	(Georgia (country)) Nino Khurtsidze	5
3	(Russia) Alexandra Kosteniuk	2½
35	(Ukraine) Inna Gaponenko	1½
14	(Germany) Elisabeth Paehtz	1
19	(Sweden) Pia Cramling	3
6	(Russia) Valentina Gunina	0
38	(China) Ni Shiqun	2
11	(Russia) Natalia Pogonina	3½
22	(China) Huang Qian	2½

3rd Round
1	(China) Ju Wenjun	3½
17	(Russia) Olga Girya	2½
40	(India) Padmini Rout	2½
9	(China) Tan Zhongyi	3½
4	(India) Harika Dronavalli	3½
45	(Georgia (country)) Sopiko Guramishvili	2½
5	(Georgia (country)) Nana Dzagnidze	1½
12	(China) Shen Yang	½
2	(Ukraine) Anna Muzychuk	2
47	(Vietnam) Pham Le Thao Nguyen	0
7	(Bulgaria) Antoaneta Stefanova	1½
42	(Georgia (country)) Nino Khurtsidze	½
3	(Russia) Alexandra Kosteniuk	4
19	(Sweden) Pia Cramling	2
38	(China) Ni Shiqun	1½
11	(Russia) Natalia Pogonina	½

Quarterfinals
1	(China) Ju Wenjun	½
9	(China) Tan Zhongyi	1½
4	(India) Harika Dronavalli	2½
5	(Georgia (country)) Nana Dzagnidze	1½
2	(Ukraine) Anna Muzychuk	1½
7	(Bulgaria) Antoaneta Stefanova	½
3	(Russia) Alexandra Kosteniuk	1½
38	(China) Ni Shiqun	½
