= Anastasia Savina =

Russian chess player (born 1992)

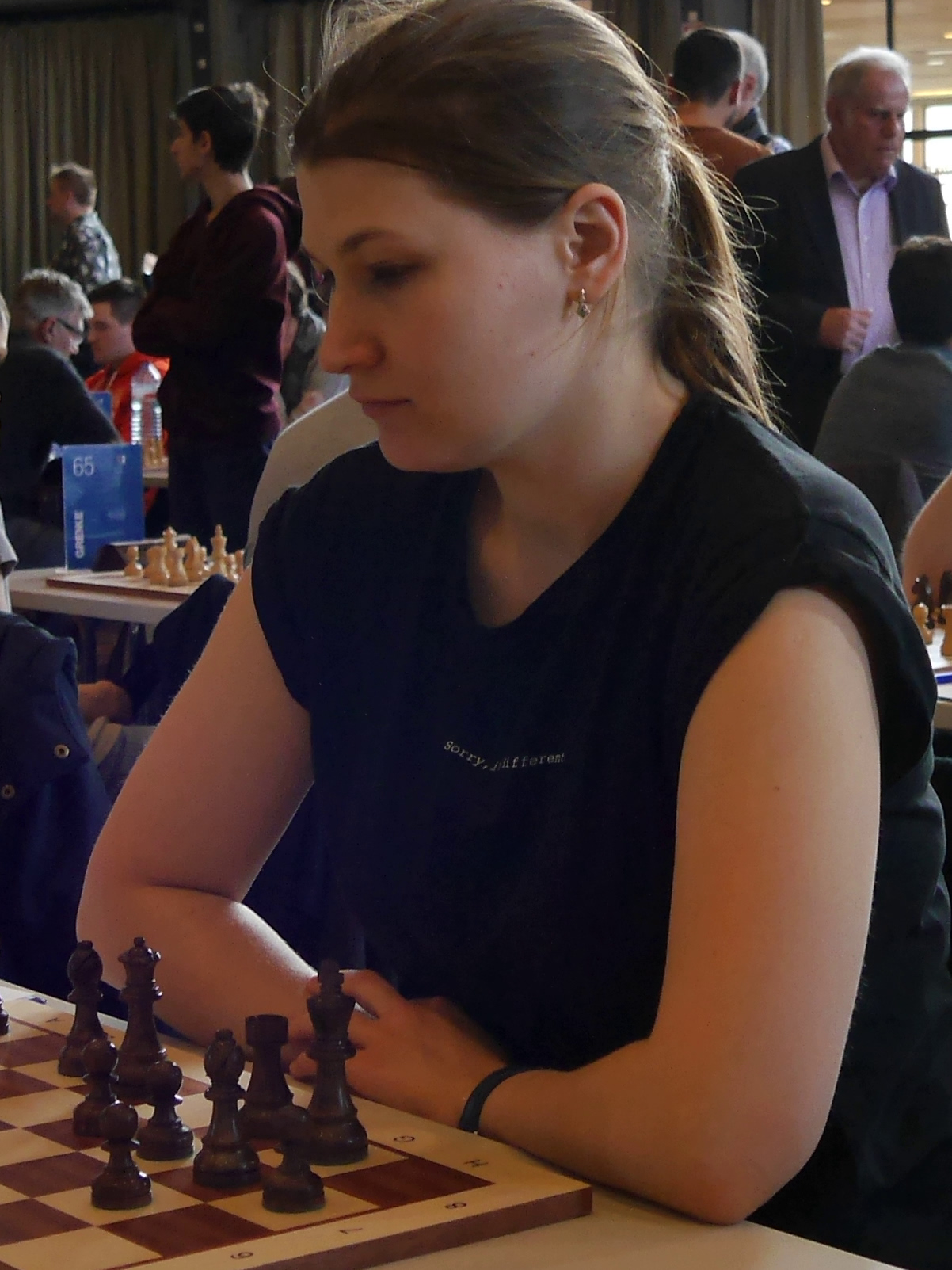
- Anastasia Savina, Karlsruhe 2018

Personal information
- Born: March 18, 1992 (age 34)

Chess career
- Country: Russia (until 2022); France (since 2022)
- Title: International Master (2011); Woman Grandmaster (2010)
- Peak rating: 2434 (September 2015)

Anastasia Savina (Russian: Анастасия Савина; born March 18, 1992) is a French chess player. She was awarded the titles International Master and Woman Grandmaster by FIDE. She later transferred federations and currently represents France.

== Career ==
Savina qualified for the Women's World Chess Championship 2016 (knock-out). She played for the Russia "B" team at the 39th Chess Olympiad and won a silver medal at chess at the 2013 Summer Universiade. She is an alumna of the Russian State University of Physical Education, Sport, Youth and Tourism, Department of Chess.
