= Gary Lane (chess player) =

Australian chess player (born 1964)

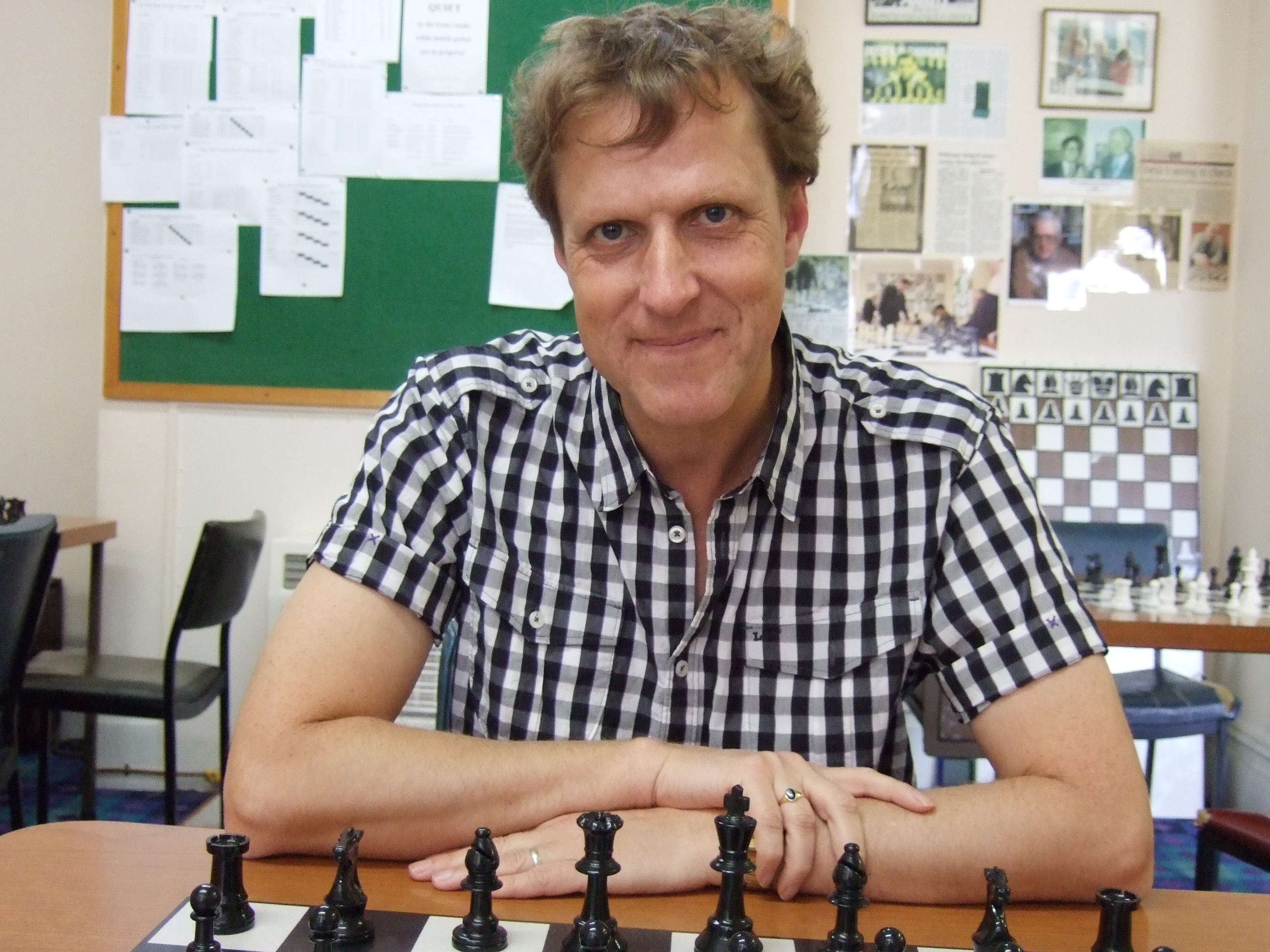
- Lane in 2012

Personal information
- Born: Gary William Lane; 4 November 1964 (age 62) United Kingdom
- Spouse: Nancy Jones

Chess career
- Country: Australia
- Title: International Master (1988)
- Peak rating: 2464 (July 2001)

Gary William Lane (born November 1964) is a British-Australian chess player and author. He became an International Master in 1987 and won the Commonwealth Chess Championship in 1988. He has written over thirty books on chess, including Find the Winning Move, Improve Your Chess in 7 Days and Prepare to Attack. There have been translations in French, Italian, Portuguese and Spanish. In the 1980s the ITV documentary "To Kill a King" was screened nationwide in Great Britain. It featured a young Michael Adams and Lane. This feature is shown regularly at chess film festivals.

== Chess career ==
After his marriage to Woman International Master Nancy Jones, he moved to Australia, winning the Australian Chess Championship in 2004. He won the 2005 Oceania Chess Championship and represented Oceania at the Chess World Cup 2005.

He has also represented Australia in the 2002, 2004, and 2006 Chess Olympiads. In the 2004 Olympiad he helped Australia score a 2–2 draw with his former country England, scoring a decisive win over World Championship title contender Nigel Short. He has been a chess coach for England or Australia at the World Junior and also European Junior championship for over a decade.

In 2012 he won the George Trundle Masters in Auckland, New Zealand with a score of 7/9, and the NZ South Island Championships in Dunedin, with a score of 8/9. He was unbeaten in both events.

In 2015 at the Australian tournament the Doeberl Cup he beat Loek van Wely the reigning Dutch Champion and one of the world's leading players. He played the Closed Sicilian which he has also written about in two books. In 2016 he came =1st at George Trundle Masters in Auckland, New Zealand with a score of 7/9, and followed this up with =1st place scoring 8/9 at the NZ South Island Championships in Canterbury. He did not lose any games in the two events. At the 2nd Fiji International Open Chess Tournament Lane dominated the event winning with the perfect score of 7/7. A score of 9/9 and clear first place was the result at the 1st Fiji International Rapid Open.

In 2020 the chess world largely closed own due to Covid restrictions. However, before the lockdown Lane was =1st at the Newcastle Open in Australia He also won outright the Exeter Open in the UK with a score of 4.5/5 which was the last weekend tournament played in England for the whole of 2020.

In 2021 a chess themed café in Sydney called Queenside introduced the GARY LANE (big breakfast roll) It is a warm bun with bacon, egg, confit mushrooms, hash brown, vintage cheddar, HP sauce and potato crisps.

Auckland, New Zealand was the venue for the Asian Seniors chess tournament in 2022. Lane won the over 50 section with a score of 8/9 and remained unbeaten. The title came with an automatic bonus Grandmaster norm.

Lane became the New South Wales Blitz champion at the end of 2022. His score of 9/11 saw him see off his younger rivals including his son Ryan in a clash of the Lanes.

Lane was featured as a Grandmaster in 2025 on the TV show NCIS Sydney, series 3, episode 5 called Black is White. In the final game of the tournament his female prodigy opponent loses and is swiftly kidnapped in a dramatic ending.

Lane is a supporter of Torquay United F.C.

== Books ==
- Lane, Gary (1990). The C3 Sicilian: Analysis and Complete Games. The Crowood Press. ISBN 978-1-852233-18-1.
- Lane, Gary (1991). The Ruy Lopez for the Tournament Player. Batsford. ISBN 978-0-713468-12-0.
- Lane, Gary (1992). Winning with the Closed Sicilian. Batsford. ISBN 978-0-713469-72-1.
- Lane, Gary (1993). Winning with the Bishop's Opening. Batsford. ISBN 978-0-713471-13-7.
- Lane, Gary (1993). Winning with the Scotch. Henry Holt. ISBN 0-8050-2940-0.
- Lane, Gary (1994). Winning with the French. Batsford. ISBN 978-0-713473-90-2.
- Lane, Gary (1994). Winning with the Fischer-Sozin Attack. Batsford. ISBN 978-0-713475-80-7.
- Lane, Gary (1995). Blackmar–Diemer Gambit. Batsford Chess Library / An Owl Book / Henry Holt and Company. ISBN 0-8050-4230-X.
- Lane, Gary (1996). A Guide to Attacking Chess. B.T.Batsford Ltd. ISBN 0-7134-8010-6.
- Lane, Gary (1997). The Grand Prix Attack: attacking lines with f4 against the Sicilian. Batsford. ISBN 0-8050-2940-0.
- Lane, Gary (1999). Victory in the Opening. Sterling Pub Co Inc. ISBN 9780713484274.
- Lane, Gary (2000). The Vienna Game. Everyman Chess. ISBN 0-8050-2940-0.
- Lane, Gary (2001). The Ultimate Colle. Sterling Pub Co Inc. ISBN 9780713486865.
- Lane, Gary (2001). The Ultimate Closed Sicilian. Batsford. ISBN 978-0-713486-87-2.
- Lane, Gary (2003). Ideas Behind the Modern Chess Openings: Attacking With White. Batsford. ISBN 9780713487121.
- Lane, Gary (2003). Find the Checkmate. Batsford. ISBN 0-8050-2940-0.
- Lane, Gary (2004). The Bishop's Opening Explained. Batsford. ISBN 0-7134-8917-0.
- Lane, Gary (2004). 'Find the Checkmate. Batsford. ISBN 978-0-713488-61-6.
- Lane, Gary (2004). Playing Chess: Step by Step. Mud Puddle Books. ISBN 978-1-594120-55-8.
- Lane, Gary (2005). Ideas Behind Modern Chess Openings: Black. Batsford. ISBN 9780713489507.
- Lane, Gary (2005). The Scotch Game Explained. Batsford. ISBN 0-7134-8940-5.
- Lane, Gary (2006). The Ruy Lopez Explained. Batsford. ISBN 0-7134-8978-2.
- Lane, Gary (2007). Improve Your chess In 7 Days. Batsford. ISBN 978-0-7134-9050-3.
- Lane, Gary (2008). The Greatest Ever Chess Tricks and Traps. Everyman Chess. ISBN 9781857445770.
- Lane, Gary (2009). Sharpen Your Chess Tactics in 7 Days. Batsford. ISBN 9781906388287.
- Lane, Gary (2011). Prepare to Attack. Everyman Chess. ISBN 978-1857446500.
- Lane, Gary (2013). Gary Lane's Chess Puzzle Book. e+books. ISBN 978-1-927179-14-7.
