= Sarasadat Khademalsharieh =

Iranian-Spanish chess player (born 1997)

Sarasadat Khadem al-Sharieh
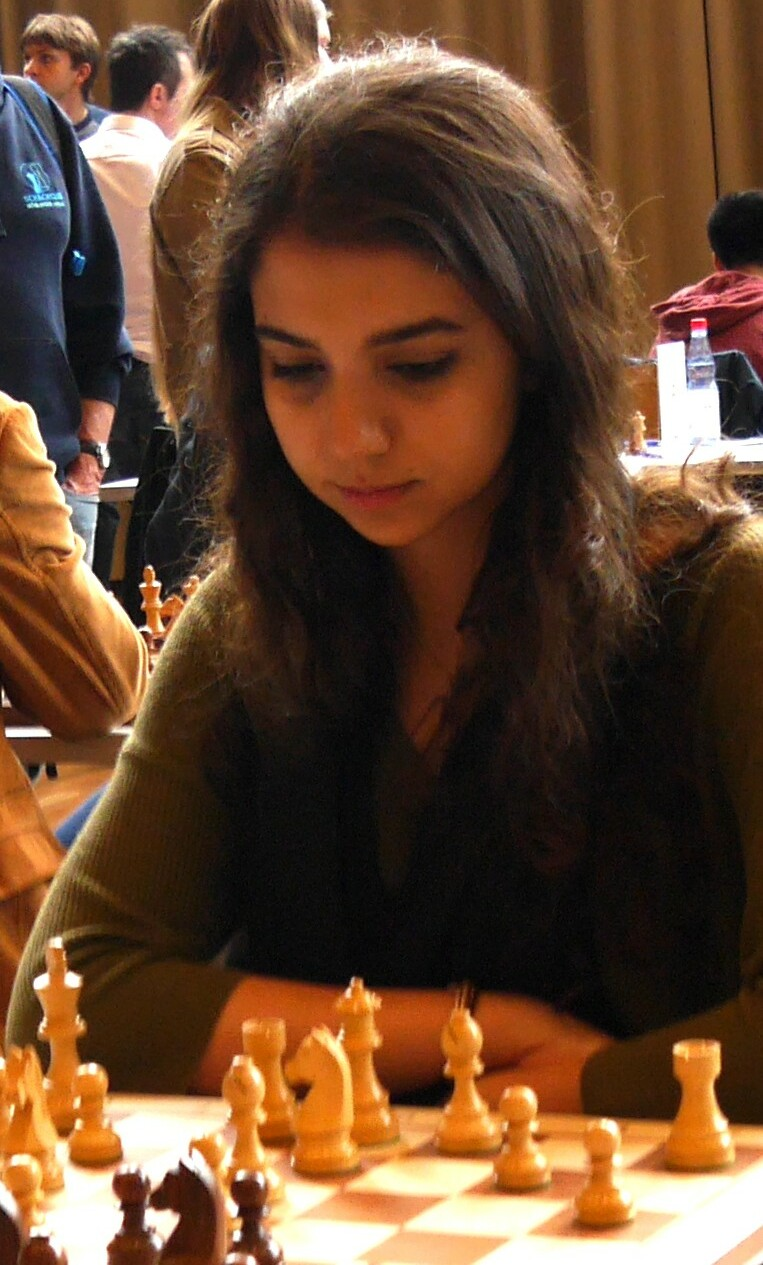
- Sarasadat Khademalsharieh at Grenke Chess Open 2017

Personal information
- Born: Sarasadat Khadem al-Sharieh; 10 March 1997 (age 29) Tehran, Iran
- Spouse: Ardeshir Ahmadi (m. 2017)

Chess career
- Country: Iran (until 2023); Spain (since 2023)
- Title: International Master (2015); Woman Grandmaster (2013)
- FIDE rating: 2414 (November 2026)
- Peak rating: 2494 (January 2020)

Sarasadat Khadem al-Sharieh (Persian: سارا سادات خادم‌الشریعه; born 10 March 1997), also known as Sara Khadem (سارا خادم), is an Iranian-Spanish chess player who holds the titles of International Master (IM) and Woman Grandmaster (WGM).

== Early life and background ==
Sarasadat Khademalsharieh was born on 10 March 1997 in Tehran. She liked various sports such as tennis and basketball growing up. After being introduced to chess by one of her classmates at eight years old, she had her parents put her in a chess class. Although her parents do not play chess, she has credited them with being very supportive of her career. She also credits one of her friends for introducing her to Khosro Harandi, an Iranian International Master (IM) and coach, as a pivotal step in furthering her career. Later on as a teenager, she was coached by Robin van Kampen, a Dutch Grandmaster (GM).

== Chess career ==
Khademalsharieh won the Asian Under-12 Girls Championship in 2008, the World Under-12 Girls Championship in 2009, the Asian Under-16 Girls Blitz Championship in 2012, and the World U16 Girls Blitz Championship in 2013. In 2014, she finished runner-up in the World Junior Girls Championship.

Khademalsharieh played for the Iranian team at the Women's Chess Olympiads of 2012, 2014 and 2016. In January 2020, she announced her resignation from the national team, though she came back to the team in May.

She won the Iranian women's championship of 2015, held in January 2016.

Khademalsharieh qualified for the FIDE Women's Grand Prix 2015–16 as host city nominee after winning a qualifying match against Atousa Pourkashiyan in Tehran. In the Grand Prix stage held in her home city, although being the lowest rated player in the field, she finished in second place and achieved her first Grandmaster norm.

She competed in the Women's World Chess Championship 2017, but was eliminated in the first round by Sopiko Guramishvili.

She was the runner up in both Women's World Rapid Chess Championship and Women's World Blitz Chess Championship 2018, held in Saint Petersburg.

She won the Spanish Women's Chess Championship of 2023, held in Marbella.

She played board 1 for Spain at the Chess Olympiad 2024, Winning individual silver herself, Spain ranked fourth.

== Personal life ==
In September 2017, Khademalsharieh married Iranian internet show presenter and film director Ardeshir Ahmadi. Her husband also holds a Canadian passport. They have one son together.

== Hijab protest ==
In December 2022, Khademalsharieh chose not to wear a hijab during the FIDE World Rapid and Blitz Chess Championships. Iranian women are required to wear a hijab in public, even while abroad, though many sportswomen were choosing not to amid ongoing protests against the Iranian government. After the tournaments, Khademalsharieh bought a house in Spain and planned to move there with her family. In January 2023, she moved to southern Spain on a residence visa tied to her housing property. That same month, Iran issued an arrest warrant against her. In July 2023, she was granted Spanish citizenship and subsequently changed affiliation from Iran's chess federation to Spain's.
