= Viktorija Ni =

Latvian-American chess player (born 1991)

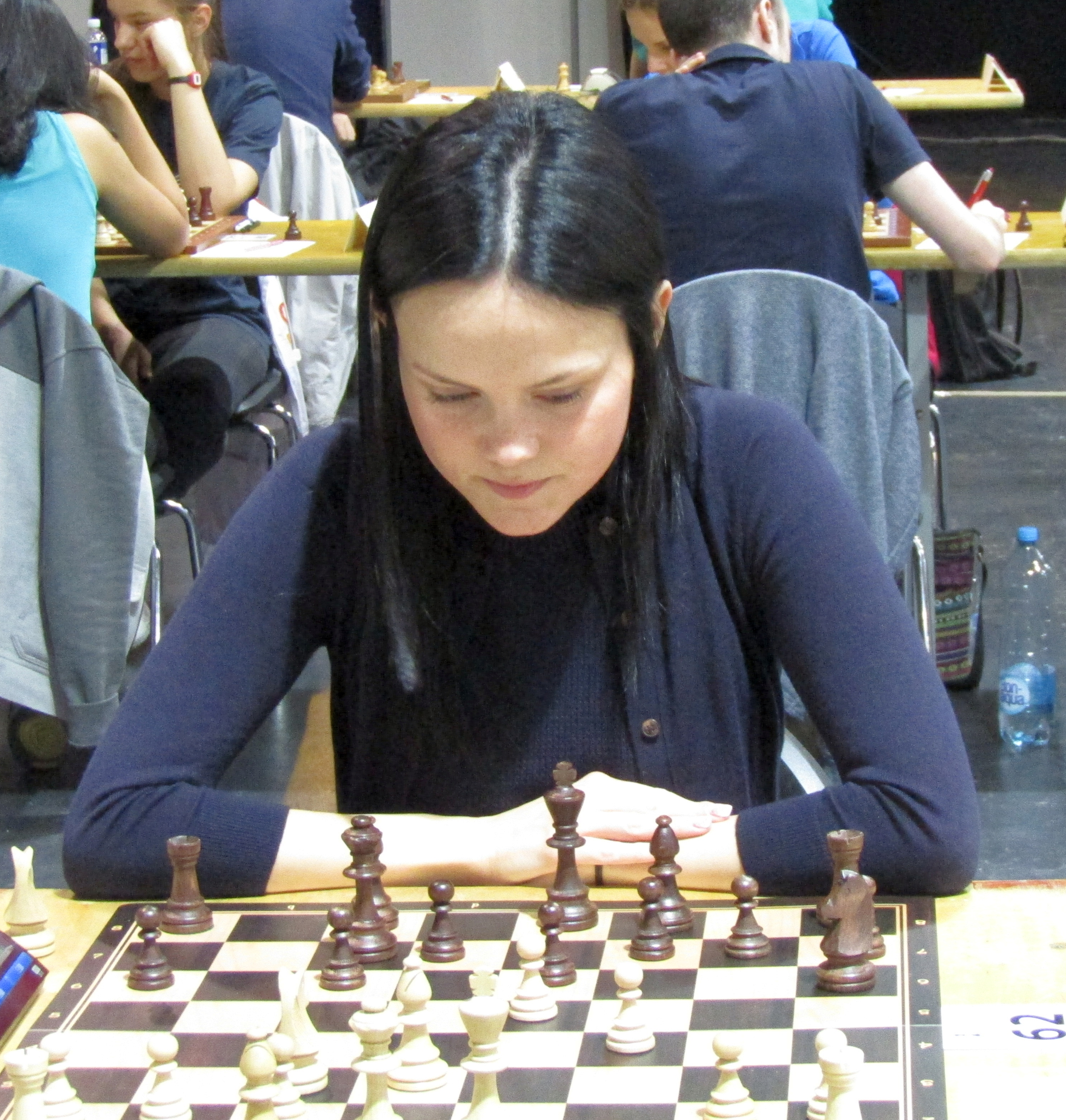
- Viktorija Ni, 2016

Personal information
- Born: December 30, 1991 (age 34) Riga, Latvia
- Spouse: Yury Shulman

Chess career
- Country: Latvia (until 2011); United States (since 2011)
- Title: Woman International Master (2010)
- Peak rating: 2264 (July 2012)

Viktorija Ni (born December 30, 1991) is a Latvian-American chess player. She was awarded the title of Woman International Master (WIM) by FIDE in 2010.

== Chess career ==
Viktorija Ni was taught to play chess at seven years old by her mother, Polina, and was trained by Jānis Klovāns. She won the Latvian women's championship of rapid chess in 2004 and 2005. In 2009 Ni was Latvian youth champion and European rapid champion in the girls under 18 category. Ni earned the title of Woman FIDE Master (WFM) in 2007 and that of Woman International Master (WIM) in 2010. She achieved her final norm required for the title WIM at the 19th Chicago Open. Ni played for the Latvian team at the Women's Chess Olympiad in 2008 and 2010, and the Four Nations Chess Challenge in 2008.

She transferred national federations from Latvia to the United States in 2011. Ni has represented the United States at the Women's World Team Chess Championship in 2013 and 2015. She finished in fourth place at the U.S. Women's Chess Championship in 2012 and 2015. She competed in the Women's World Chess Championship in 2017.
