= Sopiko Guramishvili =

Georgian-Dutch chess player (born 1991)

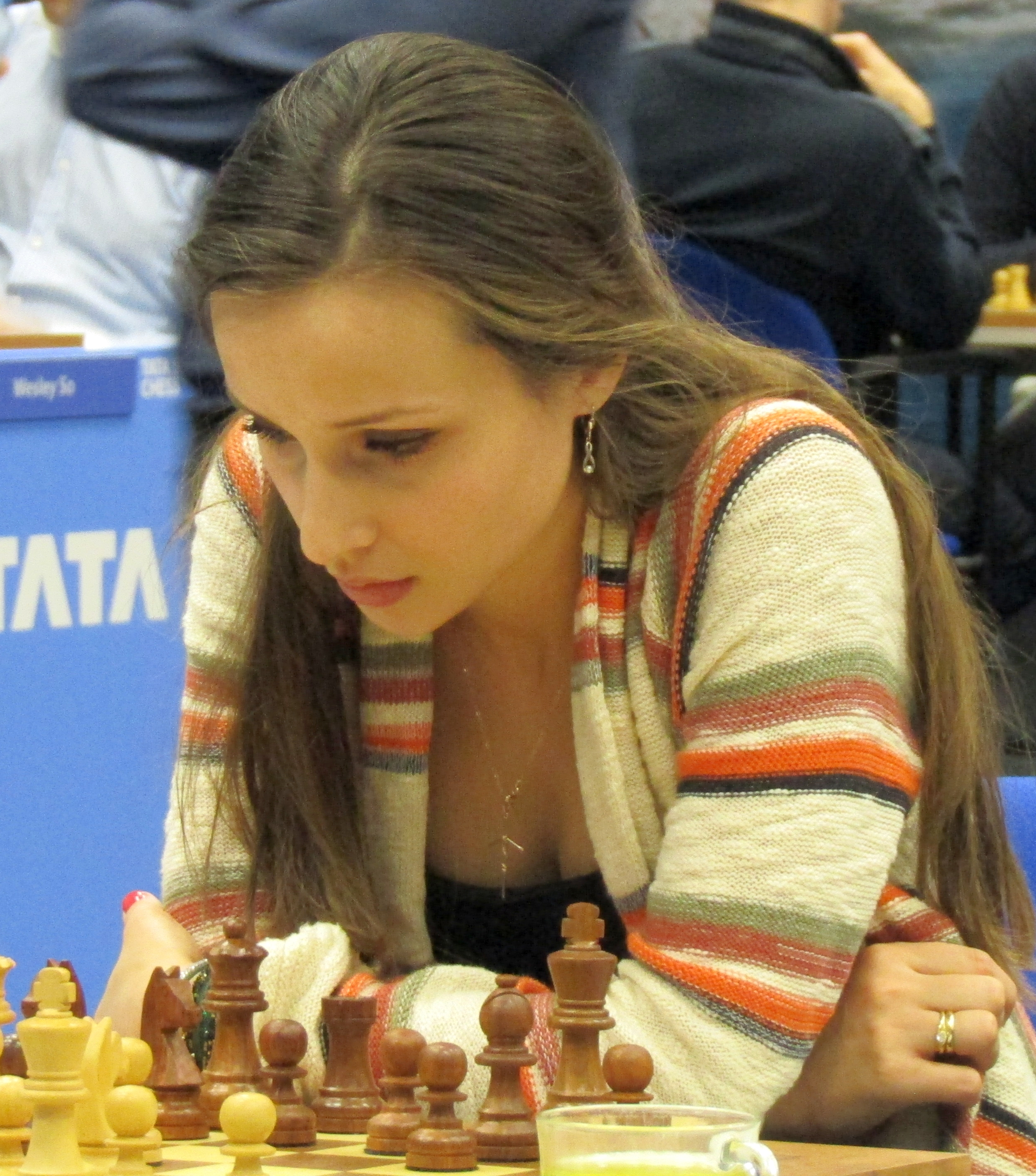
- Guramishvili in 2017

Personal information
- Born: 1 January 1991 (age 35) Tbilisi, Georgian SSR, Soviet Union
- Spouse: Anish Giri (m. 2015)
- Children: 3

Chess career
- Country: Georgia (until 2019); Netherlands (since 2019)
- Title: International Master (2012); Woman Grandmaster (2009)
- FIDE rating: 2383 (March 2020)
- Peak rating: 2441 (November 2013)

Sopiko Guramishvili (Georgian: სოფიკო გურამიშვილი; born 1 January 1991) is a Georgian and Dutch chess player, author, and commentator who holds the titles of International Master (IM) and Woman Grandmaster (WGM). Having represented Georgia for the bulk of her playing career, she has been an under-16 girls' World Youth Champion and an under-18 girls' Georgian national champion. She has a peak FIDE rating of 2441 and has been ranked as high as No. 42 in the world among women.

Guramishvili began playing chess at age five. She regularly qualified for and participated in the World Youth Chess Championships from age ten onwards. She won a silver medal in the under-12 girls' division in 2003 and a gold medal in the under-16 girls' division in 2006. Guramishvili first qualified for the Georgian Women's Chess Championship at age 17. Her best finish was in 2009, when she came in joint second place and earned a WGM norm. Guramishvili was awarded the WGM title in 2009 at age 18 and the IM title in 2012 at age 21. She earned her last IM norm at the 2011 Nakhchivan Open, during which she defeated Sergey Fedorchuk, a Ukrainian Grandmaster (GM) rated 2662. Guramishvili has routinely performed well at the European Individual Women's Chess Championship, earning a double IM norm in 2010 and twice qualifying for the Women's World Chess Championship 64-player knockout tournament because of her 2013 and 2015 results. At the 2017 Women's World Championship, she eliminated higher-seeded Sarasadat Khademalsharieh and reached the round of 16. Guramishvili had her two best tournament performance ratings in 2016, with a career-best of 2509 at the Tata Steel Tienkamp.

Beyond competing at chess, Guramishvili has developed online courses and other instructional videos, in particular for chess24. With fellow IM Anna Rudolf, she has co-hosted an instructional series on chess24 where Rudolf and Guramishvili are known respectively as Miss Strategy and Miss Tactics. She was also one of the official commentators for the 2014 World Chess Championship match. Guramishvili is married to Anish Giri, a Dutch Grandmaster who has been ranked as high as No. 3 in the world.

== Early life and background ==
Sopiko Guramishvili was born on 1 January 1991 in Tbilisi, the capital of the Georgian SSR and the modern-day capital of Georgia. She was first introduced to chess inadvertently at age five while her grandmother was teaching her how to play draughts. After she was more intrigued by the chess pieces that weren't being used, her mother taught her the game. Guramishvili first qualified for the World Youth Chess Championships in 2001 in Oropesa del Mar at age ten. She finished in equal ninth out of 70 competitors in the under-10 girls' division with a score of 7 points in 11 games (7/11), (Note: A win is 1 point, a draw is a ½ point, and a loss is 0 points.) three points behind the winner Tan Zhongyi.

== Chess career ==
=== 2002–06: Under-16 World Champion ===
Guramishvili first earned a FIDE rating through the International Chess Federation (FIDE) in October 2002, starting at 2142 at age eleven. By the middle of 2003, she had earned the Woman FIDE Master (WFM) title. That year, she finished on the podium in the under-12 girls' division at both the European Youth and World Youth Chess Championships. At the former in Budva, Montenegro, she earned a bronze medal with a score of 7/9, tied with Elena Tairova and behind only Anastasia Bodnaruk, having lost to both of them. She fared better at the latter tournament in Kallithea in Greece, earning a silver medal. With a score of 8½/11, she finished ahead of Tan only on the tiebreak criteria and was runner-up to Ding Yixin, having won her games against Tan, Tairova, and Bodnaruk, but losing to Ding. Guramishvili moved up to the under-14 girls' division the following year, but had less success. Over the next two years, her best result in this division came at the 2004 World Championships, where she finished in equal fourth place.

After more than three years with a steady rating just below 2150, Guramishvili reached a new peak rating of 2180 in April 2006 with a strong performance at the qualification tournament for the Georgian Women's Chess Championship. She scored 5½/9, a point behind joint first-place finishers Sopiko Khukhashvili and Tamar Tsereteli. Although she narrowly did not qualify because of the tiebreak criteria, she gained 31 rating points. Guramishvili finished the year with a redeeming performance at the World Youth Chess Championships, which were hosted by her home country in Batumi. Despite an opening round loss to a much lower-rated player, she recovered to dominate the rest of the under-16 girls' event with wins in nine of her last ten games. She finished with 9½/11, winning the division easily by 1½ points. She also reached a rating of 2200 for the first time. This win was part of a stretch where Georgia won the gold medal in the under-16 girls' division seven out of ten times from 1999 through 2008.

=== 2007–09: Woman Grandmaster title ===
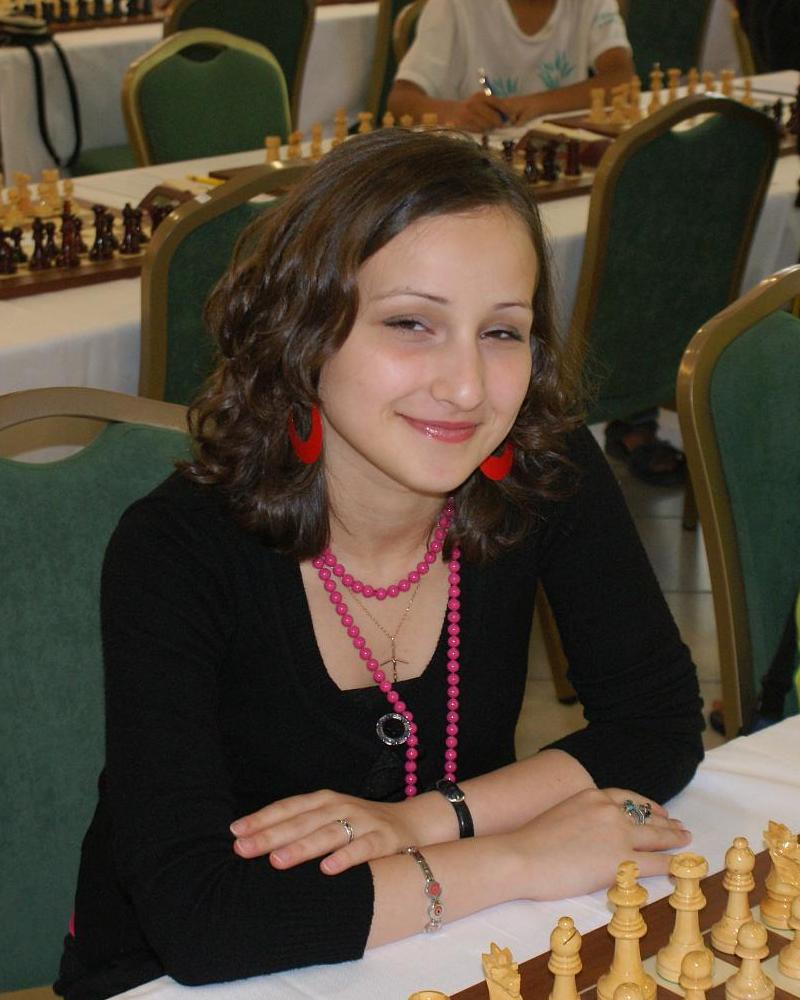
Guramishvili in 2009

Guramishvili consolidated her 2006 World Championship gold medal with another strong year in 2007, gaining about another 100 rating points and earning her first norm for the Woman Grandmaster (WGM) title. Early in the year, she fared well at both the Georgian under-18 boys' championship (Note: Although the tournament is named the boys' championship, it is open to all youth players.) and the qualification tournament for the open Georgian Chess Championship, helping her climb to a rating of 2267. A few months later, she also performed well at the Georgian under-20 boys' championship. Guramishvili's first WGM norm came in early September at the Open Internacional D'Escacs de Sants in Barcelona. She scored 6½/10 for a performance rating of 2400. This result also helped her reach a rating of 2300, the threshold for the WGM title, for the first time. At the end of year in Antalya in Turkey, Guramishvili attempted to defend her under-16 girls' world championship, but finished a ½ point behind the four leaders. The tournament was won by her compatriot Keti Tsatsalashvili.

One of Guramishvili's biggest achievements in 2008 was qualifying for the Georgian Women's Chess Championship for the first time, finishing in equal second with a score of 6½/9 in the qualification tournament. In the main championship, a 14-player round robin, she finished in the middle of the field with 5½/12, (Note: One player withdrew, leaving only 13 players.) a result consistent with her rating. She qualified for the Women's Championship again in 2009. With only 12 players in the field, she had a much better result, finishing in equal second with four other players who scored 6½/11, a ½ point behind the winner Maia Lomineishvili. Moreover, she earned her second WGM norm. Guramishvili earned her third and final WGM norm at her next tournament, the European Individual Women's Chess Championship, and was awarded the title in June at 18 years old. That May, she won the Georgian under-18 girls' championship and also finished in equal first in the Georgian under-20 girls' championship, narrowly coming in second place to Miranda Mikadze on the tiebreak criteria. At another tournament, she had a win against Gevorg Harutjunyan, an Armenian Grandmaster (GM) rated 2504, at a tournament in Tbilisi. At the end of the year, Guramishvili was in contention to win the under-18 girls' division at the World Youth Chess Championships, but lost to the eventual winner Olga Girya in the penultimate round and ultimately finished in sixth place.

=== 2010–13: International Master title ===
Although Guramishvili maintained a rating in the low 2300s through the middle of 2011, she continued to progress by attaining all three of her norms for the International Master (IM) title over this span. She earned her first two IM norms as a double norm at the 2010 European Individual Women's Chess Championship. (Note: FIDE regulations have allowed norms at women's continental championships to count as double norms if a minimum of nine games were played.) She improved on her 2009 result of 6/11 with a score of 6½/11, corresponding to a performance rating of 2467. In August, Guramishvili participated in the under-20 World Junior Chess Championships in Chotowa in Poland, finishing in eighth place, 2½ points behind the winner Anna Muzychuk. A month later, she also participated in the women's event at the 2010 World University Chess Championship in Zurich and had a much better result, winning the bronze medal, having finished in joint second with Ljilja Drljević and a ½ point behind the winner Batkhuyagiin Möngöntuul. Guramishvili's best results from late 2010 through the first half of 2011 were at the 2010 Torneo Internacional Femenino Gran Hotel Bali in Spain and the 2011 Nakhchivan Open in Azerbaijan. She won the former tournament, a ten-player women's round robin, ahead of higher-rated players Alina l'Ami and her compatriot Ana Matnadze. At the latter tournament, she earned her third and final IM norm. Although she only scored 4/9, she still had a performance rating of 2451 as she had faced opponents with a much higher average rating of 2492. During the tournament, she defeated Sergey Fedorchuk, a Ukrainian GM rated 2662. With all three IM norms, she only needed to reach a rating of 2400 to qualify for the title.

Over the next twelve months, Guramishvili gained about another 100 rating points, a stretch that began in May 2011 after the Nakhchivan Open. In particular, she finished a ½ point behind the winner at the Paleochora International Chess Tournament in Greece, gaining 31 rating points. She then won two tournaments, namely the qualification tournament for the Georgian Women's Chess Championship in December, followed by the women's round robin event at the Reggio Emilia tournament in January. The open event at the latter tournament was won by her future husband Anish Giri. With another score of 6½/11 at the European Individual Women's Chess Championship in March, Guramishvili passed the 2400 rating threshold to earn the IM title at age 21. She ended 2012 by winning the Torneo Internacional Femenino Gran Hotel Bali for a second time.

Guramishvili continued to steadily increase her rating through most of 2013, reaching her career-best rating of 2441 that November. She also reached a career-best women's ranking of No. 42 in the world a month earlier. One of the few tournaments where she had a sub-par performance and did not gain rating points was at the Georgian Women's Chess Championship, where her score of 6½/11 only put her in joint fourth place. Her better performances during the year included a career-best score of 7/11 at the European Individual Women's Chess Championship and a joint first-place finish at the Torneo Cerrado Internacional Femenino Ciudad De Linares, where she was runner-up on the tiebreak criteria. At the end of the year, Guramishvili dropped below a rating of 2400 after a poor performance at the Chennai Open in India, where she had a negative score against opponents with a lower average rating.

=== 2014–present: World Championship competitor ===
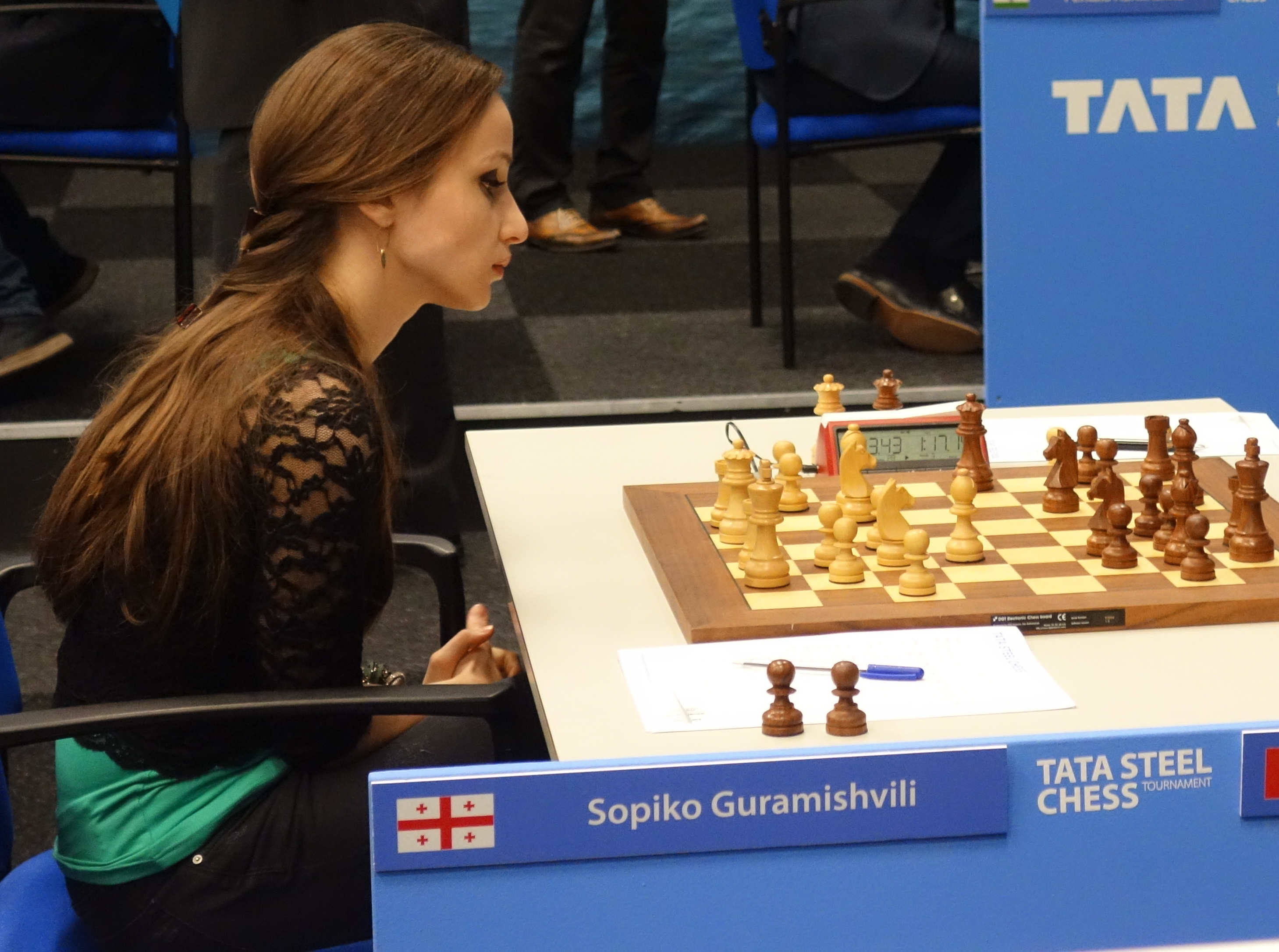
Guramishvili at the 2017 Tata Steel Challengers

Since 2014, Guramishvili has largely maintained a steady rating just below 2400 while generally playing fewer tournaments. Her biggest tournament during this span was the Women's World Chess Championship, which was played as a 64-player knockout event at the time. She qualified for the world championship tournament twice, in 2015 as the 46th seed and in 2017 as the 45th seed. She had qualified through her performances at the European Individual Women's Chess Championship in 2013 and 2015 respectively, at which she scored 7/11 and 6½/11. In 2015, she was eliminated in the first round by her compatriot Lela Javakhishvili by losing one of the two games in the second set of tiebreaks, played in a 10+10 rapid format. (Note: 10 minutes, plus 10 additional seconds with each move) They had each won one of the two classical games, and both of the 25+10 rapid games in the first set of tiebreaks ended in draws. In 2017, Guramishvili had a much better result, winning two rounds and advancing to the round of 16. All three of her matches were decided on tiebreaks. In the first round, she upset 20th-seed Sarasadat Khademalsharieh, an IM rated 2445. After they each won a classical game, Guramishvili won both of the games in the first set of rapid tiebreaks to advance. In the next round, she faced a lower-rated opponent, 52nd-seed Nataliya Buksa, who had also advanced via an upset. Nonetheless, the match was decided through 5+3 blitz tiebreaks. They each won a classical game and a 10+10 rapid game, having drawn both 25+10 rapid games in-between. In the blitz tiebreak, Guramishvili won the second game to advance. She was eliminated in the following round by 4th-seed Dronavalli Harika, a GM rated 2539. After they had drawn both classical games and both 25+10 rapid games, Dronavalli won the first of the two 10+10 rapid games to advance.

In-between competing at the two Women's World Championships, Guramishvili had the two best tournaments of her career by performance rating in 2016. She was one of the participants in the Tata Steel Tienkamp, a ten-player round robin played alongside the Tata Steel Masters in Wijk aan Zee in the Netherlands. Anna Rudolf, her regular broadcast partner, was one of the other participants. Guramishvili finished in joint second with 6/9, a ½ point behind the winner Vladimir Dobrov, a GM rated 2518. Her only loss in the event was to Dobrov. Overall, her opponents had an average rating of 2384, similar to her own rating of 2374, and her performance rating was 2509. Later in the year, Guramishvili also scored 6/9 at the London Chess Classic. With her opponents having an average rating of 2348, that score corresponded to a performance rating of 2473. Guramishvili had the opportunity to participate in the more prestigious Tata Steel Challengers in 2017, an event where the winner is invited to compete in the Tata Steel Masters the following year. She did not have a good result, however, finishing in last place. Against opponents with an average rating of 2610, she did not win any of her games, drawing three times in thirteen rounds. Guramishvili began representing the Netherlands in 2019, but has thus far not played many games since the switch.

== Playing style ==
Guramishvili primarily plays 1.d4 (the Queen's Pawn Game) with the white pieces. She also prefers 1.Nf3 (the Zukertort Opening) or 1.c4 (the English Opening) compared to 1.e4 (the King's Pawn Game). With the black pieces, she often defends against 1.e4 with the Sicilian defence (1.e4 c5), which she commonly continues with the Najdorf variation (1.e4 c5 2.Nf3 d6 3.d4 cxd4 4.Nxd4 Nf6 5.Nc3 a6).

== Personal life ==
Guramishvili graduated from Ilia State University in Georgia in 2013, where she studied English and Spanish.

Guramishvili married fellow chess player Anish Giri in July 2015. Giri is a Russian-born Dutch Grandmaster of Russian and Nepalese-Indian descent who has frequently been ranked in the top 10 in the world since 2014, peaking at No. 3. They met at the Reggio Emilia tournament that took place around New Year's Day in 2012, where Guramishvili won the women's event and Giri won the open event. They live in The Hague in the Netherlands, and have two sons and a daughter who were born in October 2016, June 2021 and September 2023 respectively. Guramishvili switched federations from Georgia to the Netherlands in 2019.

Guramishvili has been a regular online instructor for chess24. Together with fellow International Master Anna Rudolf, she has been making videos for the Miss Strategy and Miss Tactics series since 2014, in which Rudolf plays the role of Miss Strategy and Guramishvili plays the role of Miss Tactics. The series combines strategical and tactical approaches to chess. Guramishvili has also authored a chess24 series on how to play with the black pieces in the Sicilian Najdorf variation, and has two Chessable courses on how to play with the black pieces in the Queen's Gambit Accepted. In addition to instructional videos, Guramishvili has also commentated on chess tournaments for both chess24 and Chess.com. In particular, she and Peter Svidler were the official English language commentators for the 2014 World Chess Championship match between Magnus Carlsen and Viswanathan Anand.
