= Anna Rudolf =

Hungarian chess player (born 1987)

- Rudolf in 2016

Personal information
- Born: 12 November 1987 (age 38) Miskolc, Hungary

Chess career
- Country: Hungary
- Title: International Master (2015); Woman Grandmaster (2008)
- FIDE rating: 2325 (November 2017)
- Peak rating: 2393 (July 2010)

Twitch information
- Channel: Anna_Chess
- Years active: 2018–present
- Genre: Gaming
- Game: Chess
- Followers: 277 thousand

YouTube information
- Channel: Anna Rudolf
- Subscribers: 205 thousand
- Views: 16 million
- Last updated: 15 December 2025

Anna Rudolf (born 12 November 1987) is a Hungarian chess player, chess commentator, livestreamer, and YouTuber who holds the titles of International Master (IM) and Woman Grandmaster (WGM). She is a three-time Hungarian women's national chess champion and has represented Hungary at the Chess Olympiad and the European Team Chess Championship. She has a peak FIDE rating of 2393 and a career-best ranking of No. 71 in the world among women.

Rudolf began playing chess with her younger sister Kata when she was four years old. They had success at a young age, both qualifying for the World Youth Chess Championships, where Rudolf finished in the top 10 of the under-12 girls' division in 1999. In Hungary, she became a three-time girls' national champion, once each at the under-12 and under-16 youth levels and the under-20 junior level. At the senior level, Rudolf qualified for the Woman Grandmaster title in 2007 when she reached a rating of 2300 and earned three WGM norms, including a double norm at the European Individual Women's Chess Championship, all at age 19.

Rudolf did not qualify for the International Master title until seven years later in 2014, having earned her three IM norms years apart in 2007, 2010, and 2014, and briefly reaching the rating threshold of 2400 in 2010. One of her best tournament results came at the 2007 Vandœuvre Open where she had a career-best performance rating of 2541 and earned both her last WGM norm and first IM norm. In her career, she has defeated two Grandmasters (GM) rated above 2600, Yaroslav Zherebukh and Christian Bauer, who had ratings of 2642 and 2634 at the time of their games.

Outside of her playing career, Rudolf is a regular chess commentator at high-profile tournaments, having worked with both Chess.com and chess24. She was the official commentator for the 2018 World Chess Championship together with her childhood idol Judit Polgár. She had started producing instructional videos for chess24 in 2013, and has co-hosted a series with fellow IM Sopiko Guramishvili where they are known respectively as Miss Strategy and Miss Tactics. Since 2017, Rudolf has not played any competitive chess tournaments and focused primarily on her broadcasting career. She launched her own Twitch channel in 2018 and also runs her own YouTube channel.

== Early life ==
On 12 November 1987 (38 years ago), Rudolf was born in Miskolc, Hungary, which was then in the Hungarian People's Republic. She grew up in Bátaszék and has a younger sister named Kata. Her father, László Rudolf, is an experienced chess player with a peak FIDE rating of 2185. He has also been a world champion of hexagonal chess.

Around 1992, at the age of 4, Rudolf learned how to play chess with her sister through the Battle Chess computer game, which follows the same rules as chess, while also animating moves and captures anthropomorphically.

In 1996, at the age of 9, Rudolf drew media attention for defeating Hungarian Grandmaster (GM) Lajos Portisch as a participant in a simultaneous exhibition. She has cited the chess legend's subsequent graciousness and encouragement as a major motivation for continuing to pursue chess seriously.

While growing up, Rudolf was coached by Béla Molnár.

In 1998, Rudolf won the under-12 girls' division of an international youth chess tournament in Visegrád, (Note: The tournament is named Nemzetközi Gyermekverseny.) while her sister won the under-10 girls' division. They had both finished runner-up one age group lower a year earlier. Rudolf won the under-12 girls' division of the Hungarian national championship in 1999, the same year her sister won the under-10 girls' division. With these victories, they both qualified for the European Youth and World Youth Chess Championships. Rudolf finished in equal ninth place out of 66 competitors in the under-12 girls' division at the 1999 World Youth Chess Championship with a score of 7/11, three points behind the winner Nana Dzagnidze.

Rudolf studied Russian and English at the University of Pécs.

Rudolf's childhood idol was her compatriot Judit Polgár, who is widely acknowledged as the greatest female chess player of all time. In 1999, at the age of 11, she had the opportunity to play against Polgár when she traveled to Budapest to participate in a simultaneous exhibition given by Polgár. She later became good friends with Polgár, helping to promote the annual Global Chess Festival started by Polgár, and the two commentated on the 2018 World Chess Championship together.

== Chess career ==
=== 2000–03: Under-16 girls' national champion ===
Rudolf first reached a FIDE rating above 2000 in January 2000 at the age of 12, having been rated 2087 on that list. She rose to a rating of 2100 in the middle of 2002 at age 14 mainly from two second-place finishes at the First Saturday FM B tournament in Budapest and the under-20 Hungarian Junior Girls' Championship in Paks. She scored 4/8 in Budapest in a field of six competitors. She scored 6/9 in Paks, only behind Lili Tóth. Although she only scored 3½/8 against her rated opponents at the Pula Open in Croatia the next month, she also gained 25 rating points there as well. Rudolf rose another 100 points again the following year, reaching 2200 in July 2003 at age 15. Her best performance during this span came at the Zalakaros Cup Open in May, where she scored 5½/9 against opponents with a much-higher average rating of 2304 to gain 45 rating points. In the second half of the year, Rudolf had one of her best results in both national and international competitions. First, she won the under-16 Hungarian girls' national championship with an unbeaten 5½/6, which was 1½ points ahead of second place. Several months later, she entered the under-16 girls' division at the World Youth Championship in Kallithea in Greece and finished equal fourth with a score of 7½/11, one point behind the leaders.

=== 2004–07: Junior national champion, WIM and WGM titles ===
Rudolf maintained a steady rating of around 2200 for a three-year period from mid-2003 until mid-2006. At the 2004 under-20 Hungarian Junior Girls' Championship, she finished in third place for the second consecutive year. She played the under-18 the following year in 2005, and also finished in third place. During 2005, Rudolf was awarded the Woman International Master (WIM) title. She resumed rising in rating in large part from another strong performance in Zalakaros, where she scored an even 4½/9 against opponents with a much-higher average rating of 2387 to gain 32 rating points. Rudolf closed out the year with a good performance at the World Junior Chess Championship in Yerevan in Armenia, scoring 8½/13 in the girls' division to finish in equal fifth, just a ½ point behind the leaders. She finished 2006 with a rating of 2279, having just turned 19 years old.

During 2007, Rudolf fulfilled both her norm and rating requirements for the Woman Grandmaster (WGM) title. At the beginning of the year, Rudolf won the under-20 Hungarian Junior Girls' Championship, scoring 1½ points ahead of second place with 8/9 and gaining enough rating to cross 2300, the threshold for the WGM title. In April, she earned her first two WGM norms as a double norm at the European Individual Women's Chess Championship, scoring 6½/11. (Note: FIDE regulations have allowed WGM norms at women's continental championships to count as double norms if a minimum of nine games were played.) After a poor performance at the World Junior Chess Championship in Yerevan where she lost 51 rating points with 5/11, Rudolf produced the best result of her career by performance rating at the 2007 Vandœuvre Open in late December. She won the first four rounds of the event, including victories over Christian Bauer and Cyril Marzolo, the former of which was the top seed and a GM rated 2634, and the latter was an IM rated 2478. After a loss to the eventual tournament winner Thorsten-Michael Haub, she won a fifth game against Vera Nebolsina and finished in ninth place with 6/9. She faced the most difficult opposition in the tournament with her opponents having an average rating of 2421. She squandered an opportunity to finish equal first by losing her last game, which she had needed to win, against Ilmārs Starostīts. The tournament became enshrouded in controversy when three Latvian players (Starostīts, Oleg Krivonosov, and Vladimir Lazarev) falsely accused Rudolf of cheating by hiding a computer in her lip balm. Starostīts in particular asked the arbiter to confiscate her belongings and refused to shake her hand before their game, an action which could have been penalized. Marie Boyarchenko, another player at the event, believed these actions were key factors in Rudolf losing that last-round game. Overall, Rudolf compiled a performance rating of 2541, second only to the winner Haub and sufficient for both her final WGM norm as well as her first IM norm. She was officially awarded the WGM title in 2008.

=== 2008–11: Three-time national champion, second IM norm, 2400 rating ===
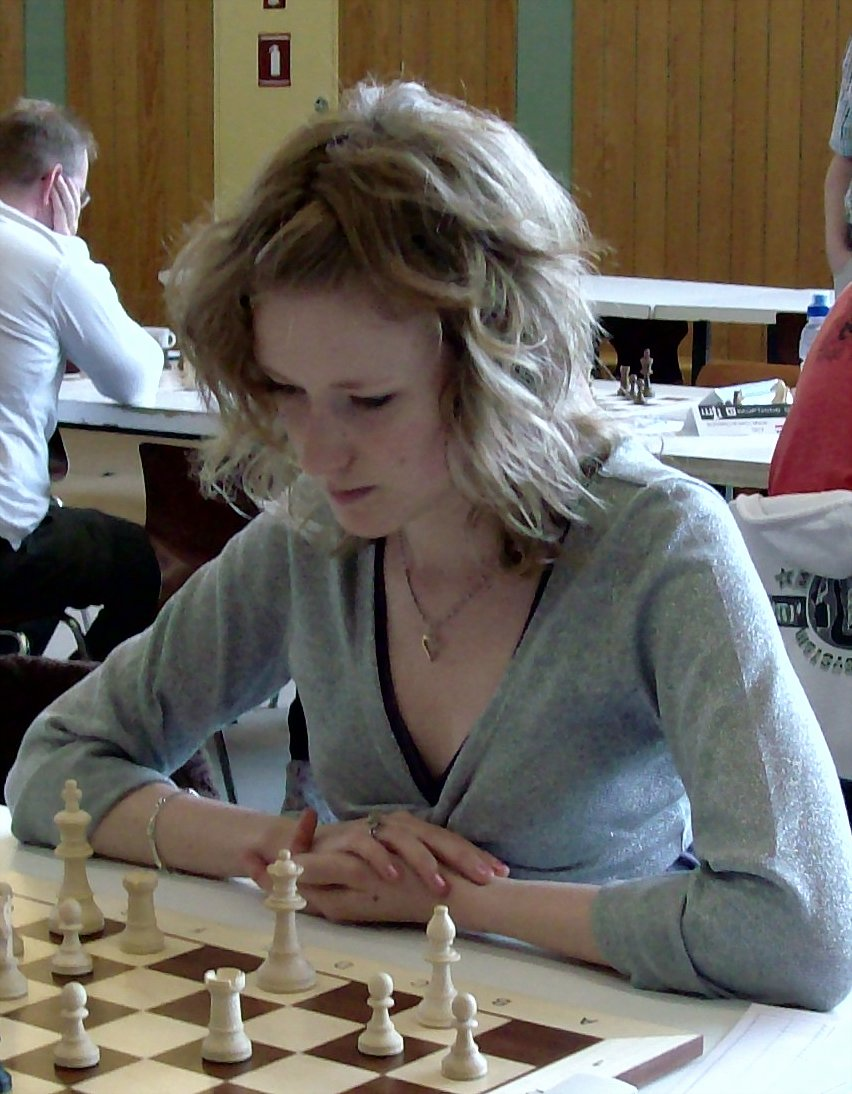
Rudolf in 2008

Over the next four years, Rudolf won the Hungarian women's national championship three times in 2008, 2010, and 2011. Her first national championship in the 2008 event came in a knockout tournament in which she won the final against Veronika Schneider. After the tournament switched to a 10-player round robin, she won the 2010 event easily by 1½ points over Tóth and Melinda Göcző with a score of 7½/9. The 2011 event was more competitive, ending with three players tied for first with 6/9 and Rudolf winning over Schneider and Ticia Gara on the tiebreak criteria.

Overall, Rudolf maintained a rating near 2300 for about three years from when she first achieved it through March 2010. She reached a new career-best rating of 2337 in the middle of 2008 by following up her excellent performance at the Vandœuvre Open with good results at the Open International de Cappelle in February, the Kaupthing Open A in May, and the Hungarian Team Championship Final that was played twice a month from October through May. Rudolf's last major rating climb occurred in the middle of 2010. In February, she participated in the Talent and Courage IM tournament in Szentgotthárd in her home country, a ten-player round robin for talented young players that was held in conjunction with a GM tournament. As only the seventh-highest rated player, she won the event with a score of 6½/9, a ½ point ahead of Attila Gergacz, who with a rating of 2421 was the highest-rated player participating. She was undefeated at the tournament, and won her games against both the second and third-place finishers. With a performance rating of 2499, she also earned her second IM norm. This helped her reach another career-best rating at 2344 in May 2010.

In the next list for July 2010, Rudolf rose to a rating of 2393, the highest published rating of her career and putting her among the top 100 women's players at No. 71 in the world. This climb of nearly 50 points was primarily from winning her second national championship as well as another good performance in the half-year-long Hungarian Team Championship Final. She entered her first tournament of the next rating period, the Heart Of Finland, needing seven rating points to reach 2400. After a last-round win against Mikael Agopov, a Finnish IM rated 2436, she reached an unpublished rating of 2397.80, having gained 4.80 points at the event. She then began her next event, the Open Internacional Hotel Avenida de Canarias in Spain, with two wins against much lower-rated players. As a result, Rudolf reached an overall career-best unpublished rating of 2401.25, passing the 2400 threshold required for the IM title, and only needed one more IM norm to qualify for the title. Nonetheless, she did not finish that tournament well and ended up keeping a rating of around 2350 through the end of 2011.

=== 2012–17: International Master title ===
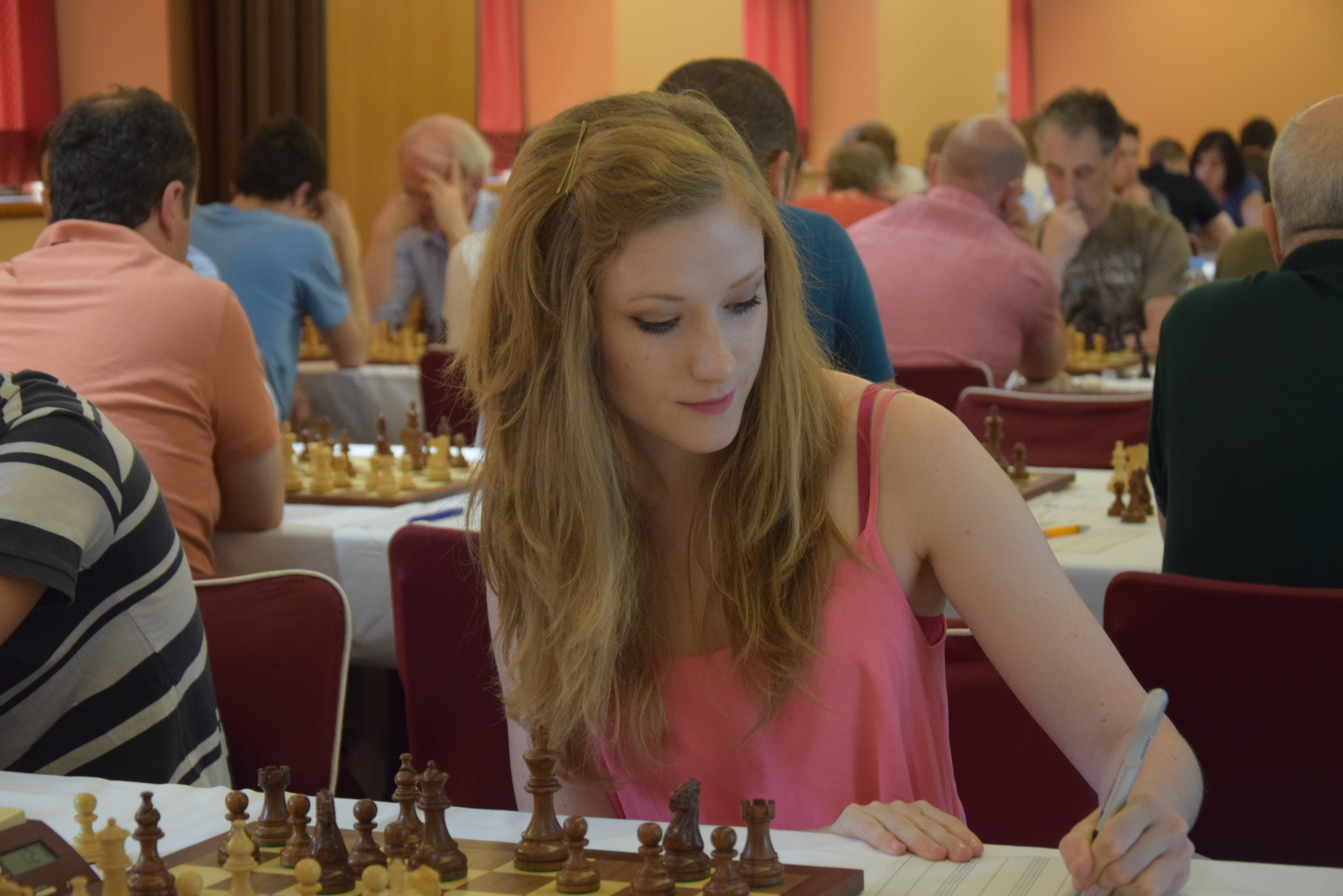
Rudolf in 2016

Rudolf was unable to match her success in the Hungarian women's national championship the remaining times she participated. As the two-time defending champion in 2012, she finished in joint fourth with a score of 5/9, 1½ points behind the winner Petra Papp. The following year, she finished in third place with 5½/9, but two points behind the winner Anita Gara.

Rudolf kept a steady rating in the low 2300s and high 2200s for about four years from mid-2012 through mid-2016, having fallen slightly from her peak in 2010. At the 2012 Open International de Cappelle, Rudolf won a game against Yaroslav Zherebukh, a GM who with a rating of 2642 was the highest-rated player she ever defeated. In the middle of 2014, Rudolf earned her final IM norm in the Master Open at the Biel Chess Festival in Switzerland. She scored 6/11 and was able to count her performance of 5½/9 in the first nine rounds towards a norm. She was awarded the International Master title in 2015.

In the middle of 2016, Rudolf had her first significant longterm drop in rating in years. After only scoring 4/11 at the European Individual Women's Chess Championship, highlighted by losses against lower-rated players in the last three rounds, she lost 54 rating points. Because she only participated in a few tournaments thereafter, she kept a rating near 2250 for a little over a year. Nonetheless, Rudolf was able to regain that lost rating and more in the last two events of her career in late 2017. At her penultimate tournament, she scored 5½/7 at the CE Division de Honor in Spain, a team club competition. Although she and her teammate Yuriy Kuzubov were among three players who tied for the highest individual score among all participants, her team did not perform well. For her last event, Rudolf played the Isle of Man International Masters, one of the world's leading open tournaments. She scored 4½/9 against opponents with an average rating of 2466, a performance above the level needed for IM norms. Her three wins included one against Harika Dronavalli, a GM who is one of the leading women's players. Between these last two events, Rudolf gained 65 rating points to finish her competitive playing career with a rating of 2325.

== National representation ==
=== Chess Olympiad ===
Rudolf was a member of the Hungary Chess Olympiad women's team from 2008 to 2012. She made her debut at the 2008 Dresden Olympiad on the fourth board, playing behind Hoang Thanh Trang, Szidonia Vajda, and Ildikó Mádl. She had an average performance, scoring 5/9 as Hungary finished in 14th place out of 112 teams with a team score of 14 points (+6–3=2). Rudolf was again on the fourth board at the 2010 Khanty-Mansiysk Olympiad behind the same three teammates, with Mádl swapping boards with Vajda. As a team, Hungary produced a near-identical result with the exact same team score and a 15th-place finish. Rudolf did not have as good of a performance, scoring 2½/5 and being substituted for reserve player Ticia Gara in the other six rounds. Rudolf made her last Olympiad appearance at the 2012 Istanbul Olympiad, this time on the third board behind Hoang and Ticia Gara and ahead of Anita Gara as well as Papp, who was given a significant number of games as a reserve. Hungary again had the exact same team score, this time putting them in 17th place. Rudolf scored better than her other Olympiads with 5/8, but still performed slightly below expectation based on her rating.

=== European Team Chess Championship ===
Rudolf also represented Hungary in the women's division at the European Team Chess Championship from 2009 to 2015, an event that is held every two years like the Chess Olympiad. At her first event, she played the second board behind Szidonia and ahead of the Gara sisters. She had a good performance, scoring 4/7 and gaining 10 rating points. Hungary finished in 10th place out of 28 teams with 10 points (+4–3=2). Rudolf's best performance at the event came in 2013. Although she was the reserve player, she had the opportunity to play all but one round and scored 6½/8, compiling a performance rating of 2395 and gaining 20 rating points. Hungary also produced their best result in the years Rudolf participated, finishing in sixth place with 11 points (+4–2=3).

== Playing style ==
Rudolf prefers to play 1.e4 (the King's Pawn Game) instead of 1.d4 (the Queen's Pawn Game) or other first moves.

When playing against 1.e4 (the King's Pawn Game), Rudolf prefers to respond with the French Defence (1.e4 e6), which she often continues with the Tarrasch Morozevich variation (1.e4 e6 2.d4 d5 3.Nd2 Be7).

When facing 1.d4 (the Queen's Pawn Game), Rudolf commonly defends with the Queen's Gambit Declined (1.d4 d5 2.c4 e6).

== Broadcasting career ==
Rudolf began her online instructional career by creating a video series for chess24 in 2013. The following year, she teamed up with fellow International Master Sopiko Guramishvili to launch the long-running Miss Strategy and Miss Tactics video series on chess24 in which they aim to combine strategical and tactical approaches to chess with Rudolf as Miss Strategy and Guramishvili as Miss Tactics.

Rudolf had already begun to combine teaching chess with her playing career when she moved to Spain and resided in Madrid in 2010. On chess24, she presents content both in English and in Spanish. She has also released several online training courses, including one titled the Anna Rudolf Method and another via the Chessable course website on attacking strategies in chess.

Rudolf is one of the leading chess commentators. Alongside Judit Polgár, she co-hosted the official coverage of the 2018 World Chess Championship match between Magnus Carlsen and Fabiano Caruana. She has also commentated on the Grand Chess Tour. In addition to over-the-board events, she is also a regular commentator for online events hosted on Chess.com such as the PRO Chess League finals that feature professional chess players and the Pogchamps tournaments that feature popular streamers relatively new to chess.

Rudolf launched her own YouTube channel in 2016, and began streaming on her own Twitch channel in 2018. She complements her focus on chess on her YouTube and Twitch channels with variety content as well.

== Personal life ==
Rudolf has been in a relationship with Irish YouTuber Kevin O’Reilly, better known as CallMeKevin, since 2019. They were introduced to each other by Irish-Canadian YouTuber Daniel Condren, better known as RTGame, earlier that year. In early 2020, she began living with O'Reilly in his home city of Cork. In July 2021, the couple moved to Spain. Rudolf later revealed that she had never officially left Spain, and was actually visiting O'Reilly in Ireland when COVID-19 lockdowns prevented her from leaving.

In 2025, Rudolf revealed that she had been diagnosed with autism, and that she possibly has ADHD (AuDHD) traits as well.

== Awards and honours ==
In 2017, Rudolf was named "Outstanding Athlete of the City" in her hometown of Bátaszék during its 875th anniversary celebration.

== Notable games ==
- Christian Bauer (2634) vs. Anna Rudolf (2293), 2007 Vandœuvre Open: Round 2; Polish Opening
  Dylan Loeb McClain, a FIDE Master (FM), provided some comments on the game in an article he published in The New York Times. Some of these comments are included below.

Position: d1 white rook, g2 white king, f2 white pawn, b2 white bishop, h3 white pawn, a3 white pawn, g4 white pawn, e4 black knight, f5 white knight, d5 black knight, c5 white pawn, b5 black pawn, h6 black pawn, c6 black pawn, g7 black pawn, f7 black pawn, g8 black king, a8 black rook

Position after 36.Bb2
1.b4 ["the Polish, also called the Orangutan or the Sokolsky. It does not have a good reputation because White does little to fight for the center."] e5 2.a3 d5 3.Bb2 Nd7 4.e3 Bd6 5.c4 dxc4 6.Bxc4 Ngf6 7.Nf3 0-0 8.Qc2 b6 9.d3 Bb7 10.Nbd2 a6 11.0-0 b5 12.Bb3 Rc8 13.d4 exd4 14.exd4 Bd5 15.Bxd5 Nxd5 16.Ne4 N7b6 17.Rad1 c6 18.Nc5 Ra8 19.Rfe1 Qc7 20.g3 h6 21.Nh4 Rfd8 22.Bc1 Bf8 23.Nf5 a5 24.bxa5 Rxa5 25.Qe2 Raa8 26.Qg4 Kh8 27.Qh4 Re8 28.Kg2 Qd8 29.Rxe8 Qxe8 30.Qg4 Nf6 31.Qf3 Nbd5 32.g4 Bxc5 33.dxc5 Qe4 34.h3 Kg8 35.Qxe4 Nxe4 36.Bb2 (diagram) ["Bauer's critical error was 36 Bb2, which left his bishop on an exposed square. Instead, after 36 Nd4 Rd8 (36 ... Rc8 fails to 37 Nb5) 37 Be3 Nxe3+ 38 fxe3 Rc8 39 Rc1, White is fine."] 36...f6 37.Nd4 Nxc5 38.Nxc6 Nf4+ 39.Kf3 Nfd3 40.Bd4 Rxa3 41.Be3 b4 42.Rb1 b3 43.Nb4 b2 44.Nc2 Rc3 45.Nd4 Kf7 46.Ke2 Na4 47.Kd1 Rc4 48.Ne2 Ke6 49.Kd2 Nb4 50.Kd1 Kd5 51.f3 Na2 52.Bd2 Rc7 53.h4 Kc4 54.Kc2 Nb4+ 55.Kd1 Kb3 56.Nc1+ Rxc1+ 57.Rxc1 bxc1=Q+ 58.Kxc1 Nc3 59.Be3 Ncd5 60.Bd2 Kc4 61.g5 hxg5 62.hxg5 f5 63.Kd1 Kd3 64.Bc1 Nc2 65.Bb2 g6 0–1
