= Zhai Mo =

Chinese chess player (born 1996)

Personal information
- Born: March 27, 1996 (age 30) Hebei, China

Chess career
- Country: China
- Title: Woman Grandmaster (2016)
- Peak rating: 2406 (August 2015)

Zhai Mo (Chinese: 翟墨; pinyin: Zhái Mò; born March 27, 1996, in Hebei) is a Chinese chess player. She was awarded the title Woman Grandmaster (WGM) by FIDE in 2016. Zhai competed in the Women's World Chess Championship in 2017 and 2018.

She won the Girls Under 12 event of the World Youth Chess Championships in 2008. Zhai won the Women's Chinese Chess Championship in 2018. Also in 2018, she was part of the Chinese team that took the gold medal in the women's section of the Asian Nations Cup and in the Women's Chess Olympiad.
