= Mitra Hejazipour =

Iranian-French chess player (born 1993)

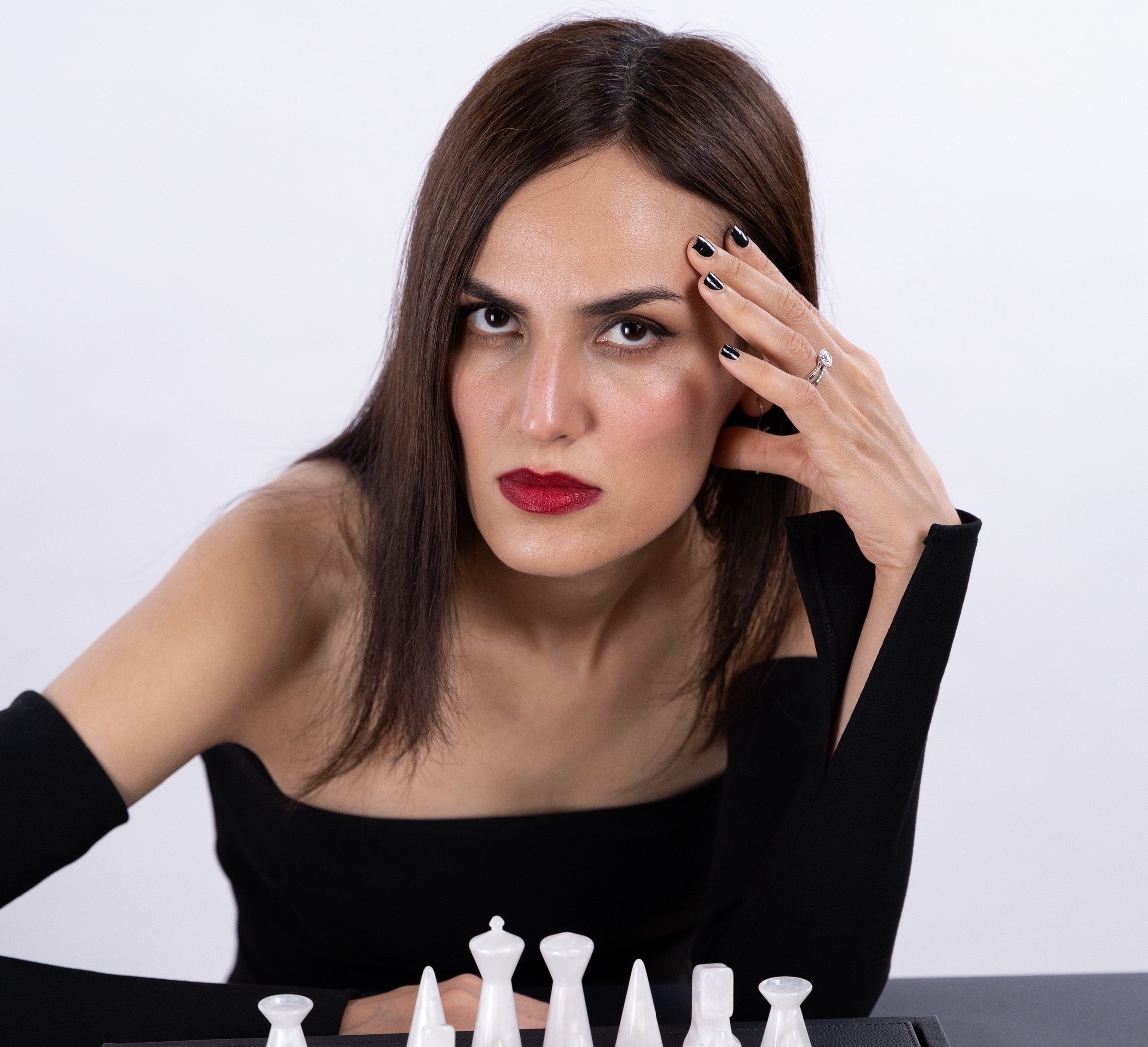
- Hejazipour in 2025

Personal information
- Born: 19 February 1993 (age 33) Mashhad, Iran

Chess career
- Country: Iran (until 2021); France (since 2021)
- Title: Woman Grandmaster (2015)
- Peak rating: 2376 (April 2024)

Mitra Hejazipour (Persian: میترا حجازی‌پور, born 19 February 1993) is an Iranian and French chess player who holds the title of Woman Grandmaster.

== Career ==
She won the silver medal in the World Under-10 Girls Championship in 2003.

Hejazipour won the Iranian Women Chess Championship in 2012. She was the runner-up in 2013 and in 2014.

She competed in the Women's World Chess Championship 2015, in which she was knocked out by Pia Cramling in the first round.

Hejazipour won the 2015 Asian Continental Women's Championship in Al Ain. Thanks to this achievement, she earned the title of Woman Grandmaster and qualified for the next knockout Women's World Championship.

She has been playing for the Iranian team at the Women's Chess Olympiads since 2008. Mitra Hejazipour was expelled from the Iranian national team in 2020 for "removing her headscarf (hijab) during the World Rapid & Blitz Chess Championship in Moscow". Hejazipour said that the hijab is a "limitation, not protection, as official regime propaganda claims."

In 2021, she began representing France where she had already been living. In March 2023, she became a French citizen.

In 2023, she became the French National women's champion.

== Personal life ==
On 14 January 2026, Hejazipour publicly supported the 2025–2026 Iranian protests, stating about the killing of 12,000 protestors: "These are the weapons that Khamenei's terrorists are using against the defenseless people of Iran."

== Achievements ==
Silver medal in World Youth Chess Championship 2002 - Girls-10
Silver medal in World Youth Chess Championship 2003 - Girls-10
Silver medal Asian youth chess championships 2002
Bronze medal Asian youth chess championships 2004
Silver medal Asian youth chess championships 2006
Silver medal Asian youth chess championships 2008
Silver medal Asian youth chess championships u18 2010
Bronze medal Asian indoor games 2007 Macao mixed team
Asian youth championships 2009 4th place
Silver medal Asian juniors chess championships 2009 Sri Lanka
Bronze medal Asian teams chess championships 2005 Esfahan, 2009 Kolkata India, 2014 Tabriz
World teams chess olympiad 2012 9th place best result for Iran's team in Iran history
World girls juniors 2013 4th place
Bronze medal World universities championships
Bronze medal Iran women championships 2007
First place in Asian continental women championships 2015
Bronze medal Asian nations cup 2018 Hamedan
First place in internationaux de France rapide 2019
French national women's champion 2023

Awards and achievements
Preceded by Irine Kharisma Sukandar	Women's Asian Chess Champion; 2015	Succeeded by Bhakti Kulkarni
