= Oleg Krivonosov =

Latvian chess player (born 1961)

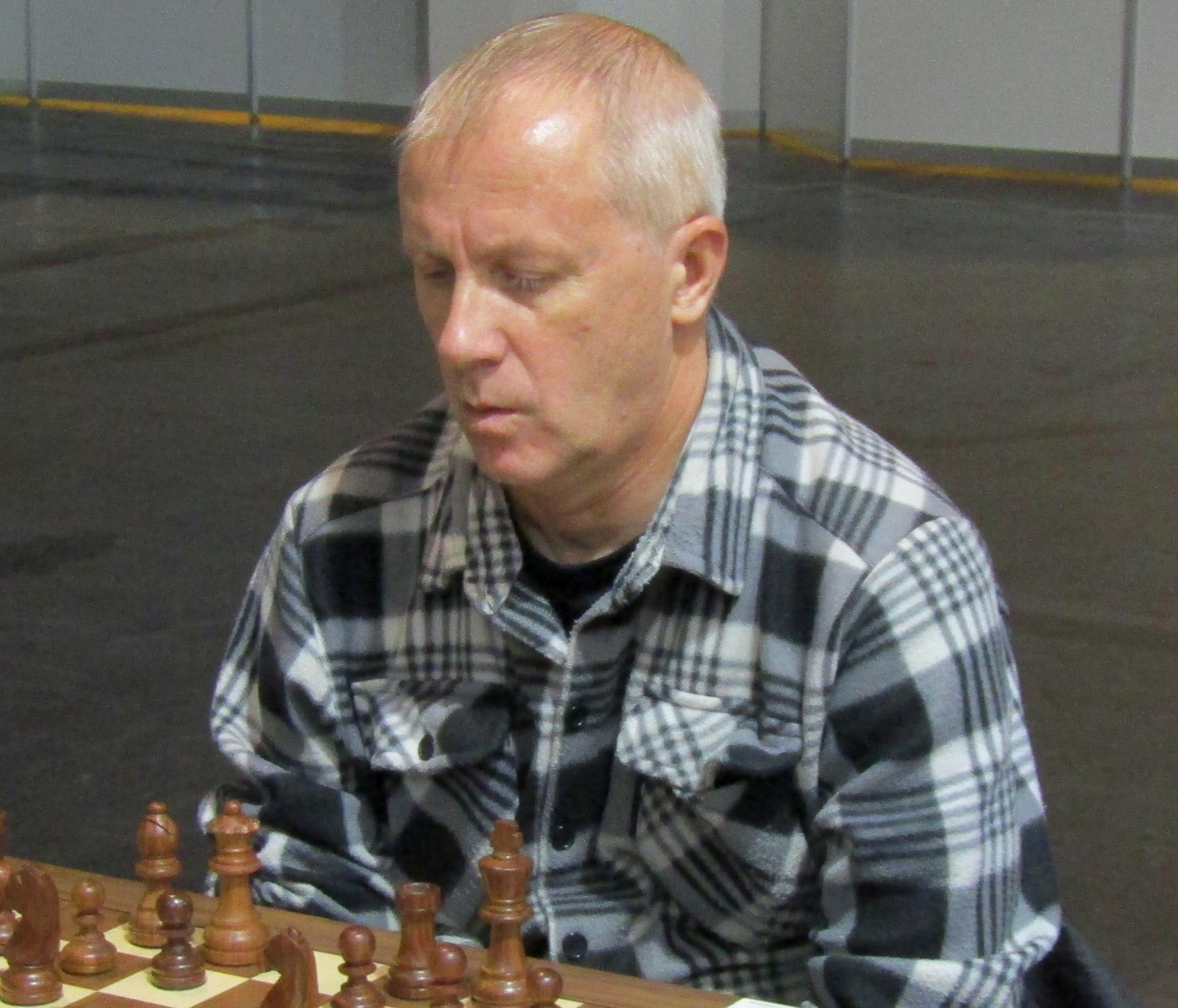
- Krivonosov in 2016

Personal information
- Born: Oleg Valerevich Krivonosov; 11 May 1961 (age 65) Daugavpils, Latvia

Chess career
- Country: Soviet Union; Latvia
- Title: International Master (1993)
- Peak rating: 2471 (March 2013)

Oleg Valerevich Krivonosov (Russian: Олег Валерьевич Кривоносов, Latvian: Oļegs Krivonosovs; born 11 May 1961, Daugavpils, Latvia) is a Soviet/Latvian chess player. He was awarded the International Master title in 1993.

== Biography ==
Krivonosov began playing at age 11 and quickly became one of the best players in Latvia. In 1978 he participated in the qualifying tournament for the USSR chess championship. In 1979 Krovonosov participated in the Championship of USSR juniors. In 1986 Krivonosov played for Latvia in the Soviet Team Chess Championships (+3, =4, -0). In 1991 at the last USSR Championship in rapid chess in Minsk with 70 participants, he shared the 4th to 8th place. Oleg Krivonosov regularly participated in Latvian Chess Championship, with as most noteworthy results: 3rd place in 1998 and in 2001. Oleg Krivonosov played for Latvia in Chess Olympiads:

- In 1998, he played at the second reserve board in the 33rd Chess Olympiad in Elista (+2 −1 =2).

Oleg Krivonosov graduated from Daugavpils Pedagogical Institute and worked in the State Police of Latvia. In the Chess Bundesliga he was playing for chess club TSV Schott Mainz.

== Vandoeuvre Open 2007 controversy ==
In the 4th edition of the Vandoeuvre Open chess tournament that he was attending, Oleg Krivonosov first accused Anna Rudolf of using the chess program Fritz, then changed the accusation to using Rybka. Gathering support from two other participants, Krivonosov claimed that Anna Rudolf, who had been playing very well and had beaten the top seed Christian Bauer, was using a lip balm in her bag as a transmitter to receive the correct moves when she used the bathroom. The accusations, which were without any material evidence, did not prevent Anna Rudolf from finishing the tournament with a high enough score to obtain her IM and WGM norms. Krivonosov is considered by many in the Chess community to be a bad sport and used the accusations to upset Anna Rudolf with the intent to reduce her performance to his own advantage. He has never apologized to Rudolf for his behavior.
