= Ayelén Martínez =

Argentine chess player (born 1993)

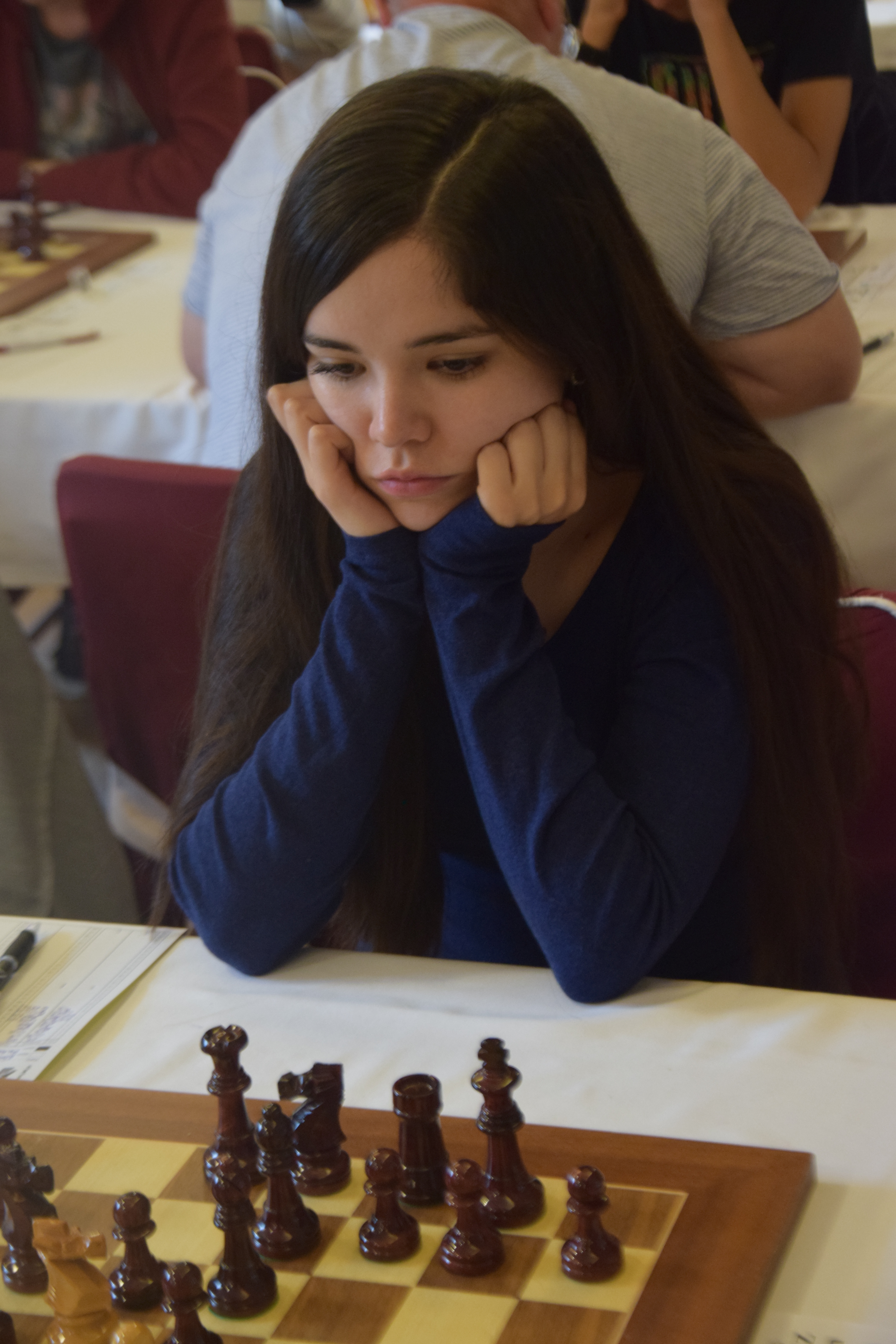
- Martínez at the 2018 Andorra open

Personal information
- Born: May 12, 1993 (age 33)

Chess career
- Country: Argentina
- Title: Woman International Master (2013)
- Peak rating: 2279 (July 2017)

Ayelén Martínez (born 1993) is an Argentine chess player.

== Biography ==
In 2009, Martínez won the Pan American Junior Chess Championship in the U16 age group. She has won the Argentine Women's Chess Championship twice (in 2012, and again in 2016).

In 2017, at the Women's World Chess Championship in Tehran, Martínez was eliminated in the first round by Zhao Xue.

She has represented the Argentine team in the Women's Chess Olympiads, participating four times (2012–2018).

For her achievements in tournaments, FIDE awarded Martínez the title of Woman International Master (WIM) in 2013.
