= Kathryn Hardegen =

Australian chess player (born 1983)

Personal information
- Born: Kathryn Ann Hardegen; 1983 (age 42–43) Philippines

Chess career
- Country: Australia
- Title: Woman FIDE Master (2017)
- Peak rating: 1959 (October 2021)

Kathryn Ann Hardegen (born 1983) is an Australian chess player who holds the FIDE title of Woman FIDE Master (WFM, 2017).

== Biography ==
Kathryn Hardegen was born in the Philippines in 1983. In 2009, she married leading Western Australian chess player Andrew Hardegen. They have one daughter, Zoe (born 2016).

== Chess career ==
Hardegen learned chess as a child. As a teenager she played board 4 for the Philippines Women's team at the 35th Chess Olympiad in Bled, 2002. In 2003, she won the Philippine Girls' Championship, which earned her the right to represent Philippines in the Asian Junior Championships in Sri Lanka later that year, where she met her future husband. Still later that year, she played for the Philippines in the South East Asian Games in Hanoi.

After a number of years away from chess, Hardegen and her husband returned to the game in 2014. In 2017, in Auckland, Hardegen won second place in the Women's World Chess Championship Oceania Zonal 3.6 tournament. The result qualified Hardegen for the Woman FIDE Master (WFM) title. She was the only player to defeat the winner, Layla Timergazi.

After Timergazi withdrew from her qualification spot, Hardegen replaced her for the Women's World Chess Championship 2018 (November) in Khanty-Mansiysk. In the first round of the tournament, she was eliminated by the eventual champion Ju Wenjun.
