= Ni Shiqun =

Chinese chess player (born 1997)

Personal information
- Born: 26 February 1997 (age 29) Shanghai, China

Chess career
- Country: China
- Title: Woman Grandmaster (2015)
- Peak rating: 2450 (April 2017)

Ni Shiqun (Chinese: 倪诗群; 26 February 1997) is a Chinese chess player, who holds the FIDE title of Woman Grandmaster (WGM).

Born in Shanghai, she finished second to third at the FIDE Zonal 3.5 Championship, a July 2015 qualifier for the Women's World Chess Championship 2017. In October 2015, Ni won the women's division of the inaugural Asian University Chess Championship, which took place in Beijing. In 2016, she also won the Women's World University Chess Championship in Abu Dhabi.

Ni defeated Lilit Mkrtchian, Valentina Gunina and Natalia Pogonina to reach the quarter-finals of the Women's World Championship 2017, where she was beaten by Alexandra Kosteniuk.
