= Women's event at the 46th Chess Olympiad =

2026 chess competition

- Host city: Samarkand
- Country: Uzbekistan
- Nations: 187
- Teams: 189
- Athletes: 937
- Dates: 16–27 September 2026
- Main venue: Silk Road International Exhibition Centre

Medalists

Team
- 1st place, gold medalist(s): China
- 2nd place, silver medalist(s): Kazakhstan
- 3rd place, bronze medalist(s): India

Individual
- Board 1: (China) Zhu Jiner
- Board 2: (United States) Alice Lee
- Board 3: (China) Lu Miaoyi
- Board 4: (Kazakhstan) Elnaz Kaliakhmet
- Reserve: (India) Savitha Shri Baskar

The Women's event at the 46th Chess Olympiad was held from 16 to 27 September 2026. It was contested by a record number of 189 teams, representing 187 nations. Uzbekistan, as host nation, fielded three teams. A total of 937 players participated in the Women's event.

China won the gold medal in the Women's event, which was their seventh title at the Chess Olympiads and the first since 2018. Kazakhstan took the silver medal and defending champions India completed the podium by winning the bronze medal. The player with the highest performance rating of 2638 was China's Zhu Jiner who scored 7 out of a possible 9 points (five wins and four draws) on board one. Individual gold medals were also won by Alice Lee with 8½ out of 10 and a performance rating of 2572, Lu Miaoyi of China with 9½ out of 11 and a performance rating of 2576, Elnaz Kaliakhmet of Kazakhstan with 7½ out of 9 and a performance rating of 2486, and Savitha Shri Baskar of India with 9 out of 10 and a performance rating of 2569.

== Competition format and calendar ==
The tournament was played in a Swiss system format. The time control for all games was 90 minutes for the first 40 moves, after which an additional 30 minutes were granted; an increment of 30 seconds per move was applied from the first move. Players were permitted to offer a draw at any time. A total of 11 rounds were to be played, and all teams had to be paired in every round.

In each round, four players from each team faced four players from another team; teams were permitted one reserve player who could be substituted between rounds. The four games were played simultaneously on four boards with alternating colours, scoring 1 game point for a win and ½ game point for a draw. The scores from each game were then summed together to determine which team would win the round. Winning a round was worth two match points, regardless of the game point margin, while drawing a round was worth one match point. Teams were ranked in a table based on match points. Tie-breakers for the table are i) the Sonneborn–Berger system; ii) total game points scored; iii) the sum of the match points of the opponents, excluding the lowest one.

The event took place from 15 to 27 September 2026. Tournament rounds began on 16 September and ended with the final round on 27 September. All rounds began at 15:00 local time (UTC+5:00), except for the final round which began at 11:00 local time (UTC+5:00). There was one rest day on 22 September, after the sixth round.

All times are UTC+5:00

| 1 | Round | RD | Rest day |

| September | 16th Wed | 17th Thu | 18th Fri | 19th Sat | 20th Sun | 21st Mon | 22nd Tue | 23rd Wed | 24th Thu | 25th Fri | 26th Sat | 27th Sun |
|---|---|---|---|---|---|---|---|---|---|---|---|---|
| Tournament round | 1 | 2 | 3 | 4 | 5 | 6 | RD | 7 | 8 | 9 | 10 | 11 |

== Teams and players ==
The Women's event was contested by a total of 948 players from 188 teams. It featured only three of the top ten players according to the FIDE rating list published in September 2026. The top-seeded team were the defending champions of India with an average pre-tournament rating of 2466. Koneru Humpy strengthened the team with her return on the first board, and the squad includes Vaishali Rameshbabu, Divya Deshmukh, Vantika Agrawal and Savitha Shri Baskar. Of the gold-winning team at the previous Olympiad, Harika Dronavalli and Tania Sachdev were absent and replaced by Humpy and Savitha. Georgia followed with the second highest average rating of 2451, their balanced team consists of Nana Dzagnidze, Nino Batsiashvili, Bella Khotenashvili, Lela Javakhishvili and Meri Arabidze. Kazakhstan were the third seeds with Bibisara Assaubayeva on the top board followed by Alua Nurman, Meruert Kamalidenova, Elnaz Kaliakhmet and Zarina Nurgaliyeva on the remaining boards.

The Chinese team was weaker for the reigning five-time World Champion Ju Wenjun, former World Champion Tan Zhongyi, former Challenger Lei Tingjie, and the inactive World no.1 Hou Yifan but the team still had a strong line-up with the fourth highest average pre-tournament rating, consisting of Zhu Jiner, Song Yuxin, Lu Miaoyi, Yan Tianqi and Zhai Mo. Anna and Mariya Muzychuk did not play for Ukraine, and the team was led by 16-year-old reigning European Champion WFM Anastasiia Hnatyshyn on board one, former World Champion Anna Ushenina on board two, as well as Nataliya Buksa, Anastasiya Rakhmangulova and Tetyana Skarbarchuk on the remaining boards. The fifth-seeded team of the United States retained Carissa Yip, Alice Lee and Irina Krush from the squad that won bronze at the previous Olympiad, Tatev Abrahamyan returned and Rose Atwell made her debut at the Chess Olympiads. Other strong teams that completed the top-ten seeds included Azerbaijan, France, Poland and Germany.

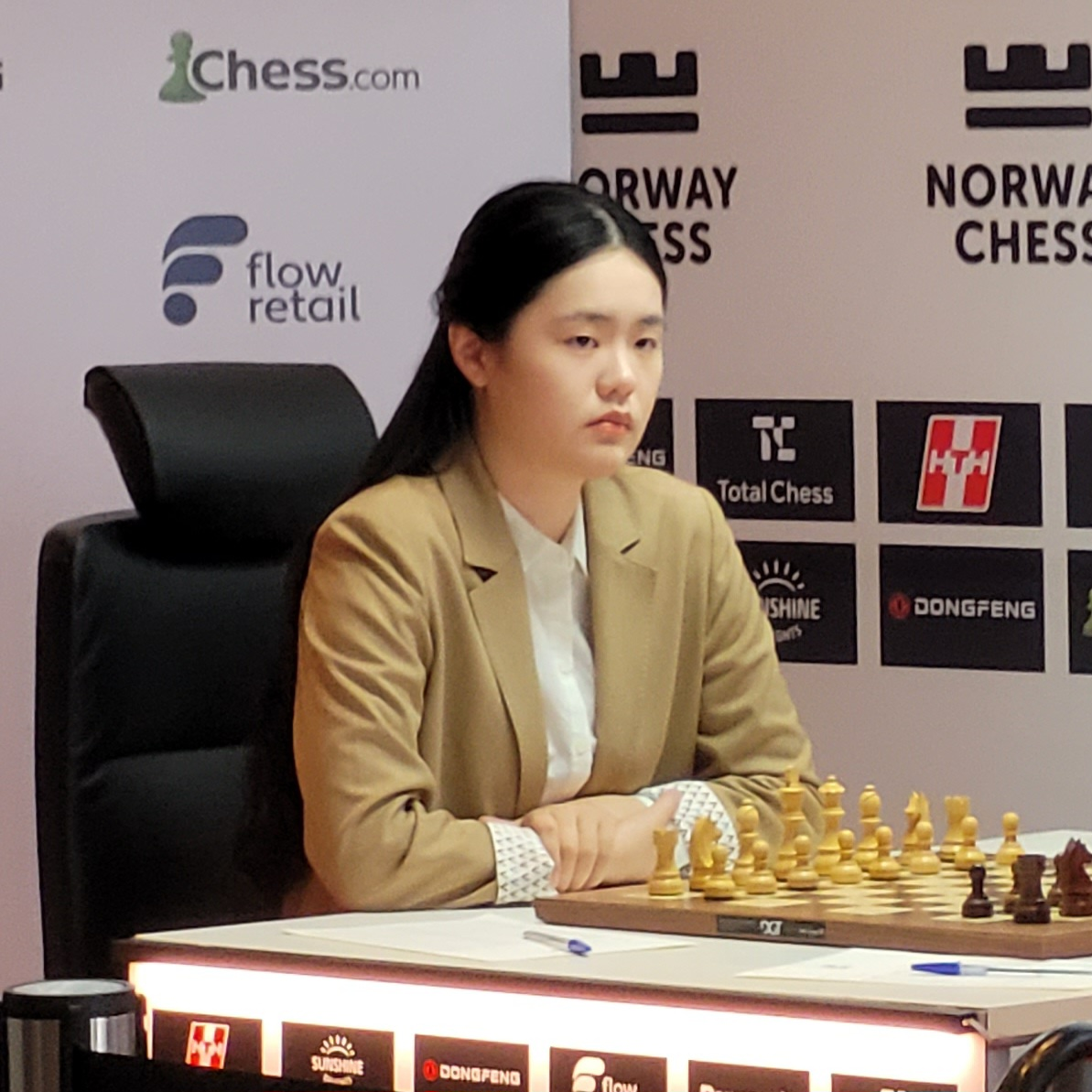
World no. 4 Zhu Jiner played on board one for China

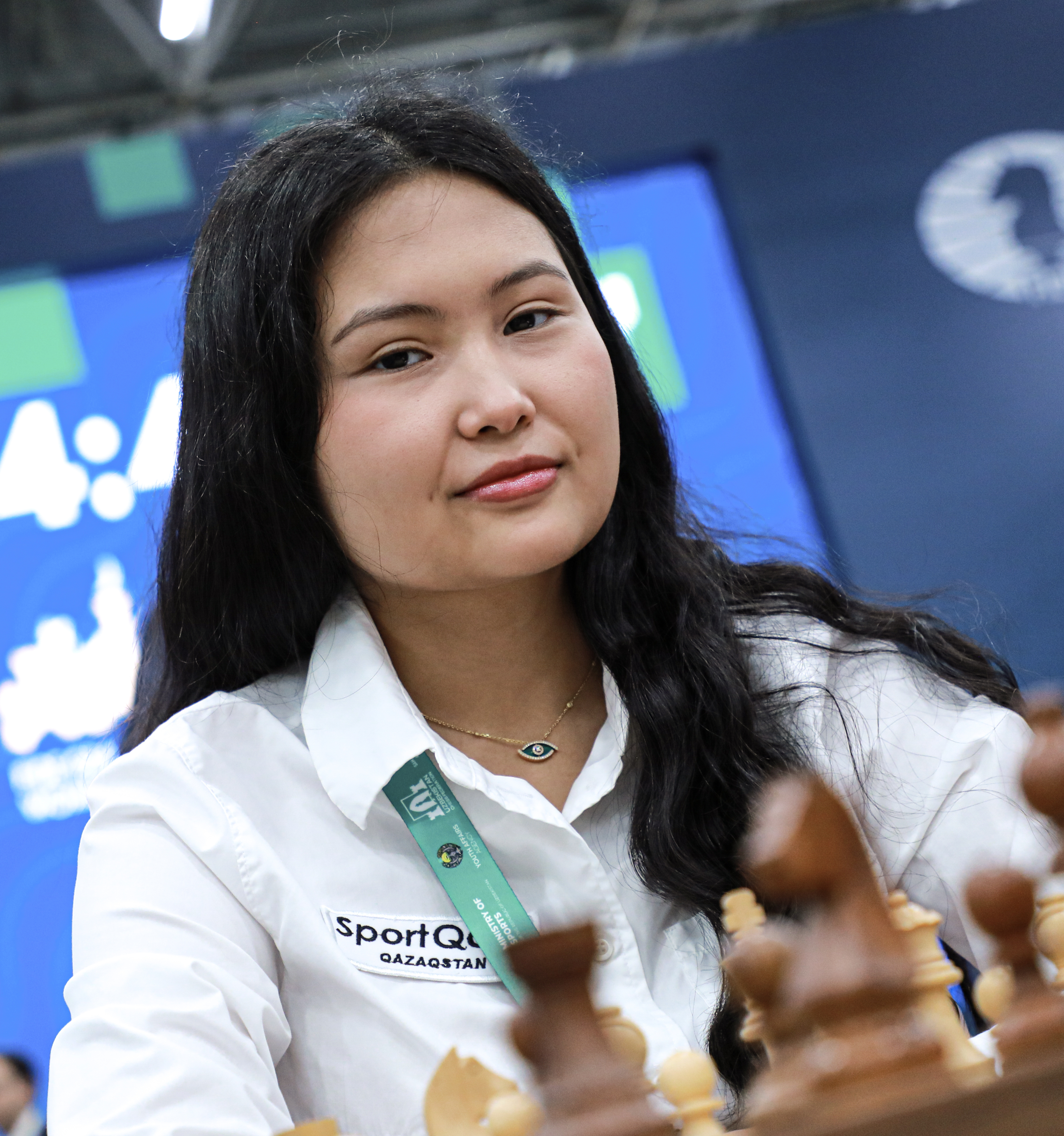
World no. 5 Bibisara Assaubayeva played on board one for Kazakhstan

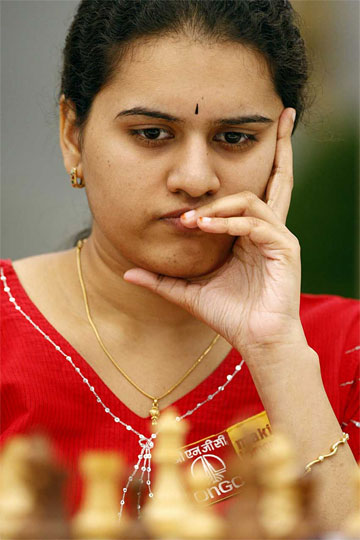
World no. 9 Koneru Humpy played on board one for India

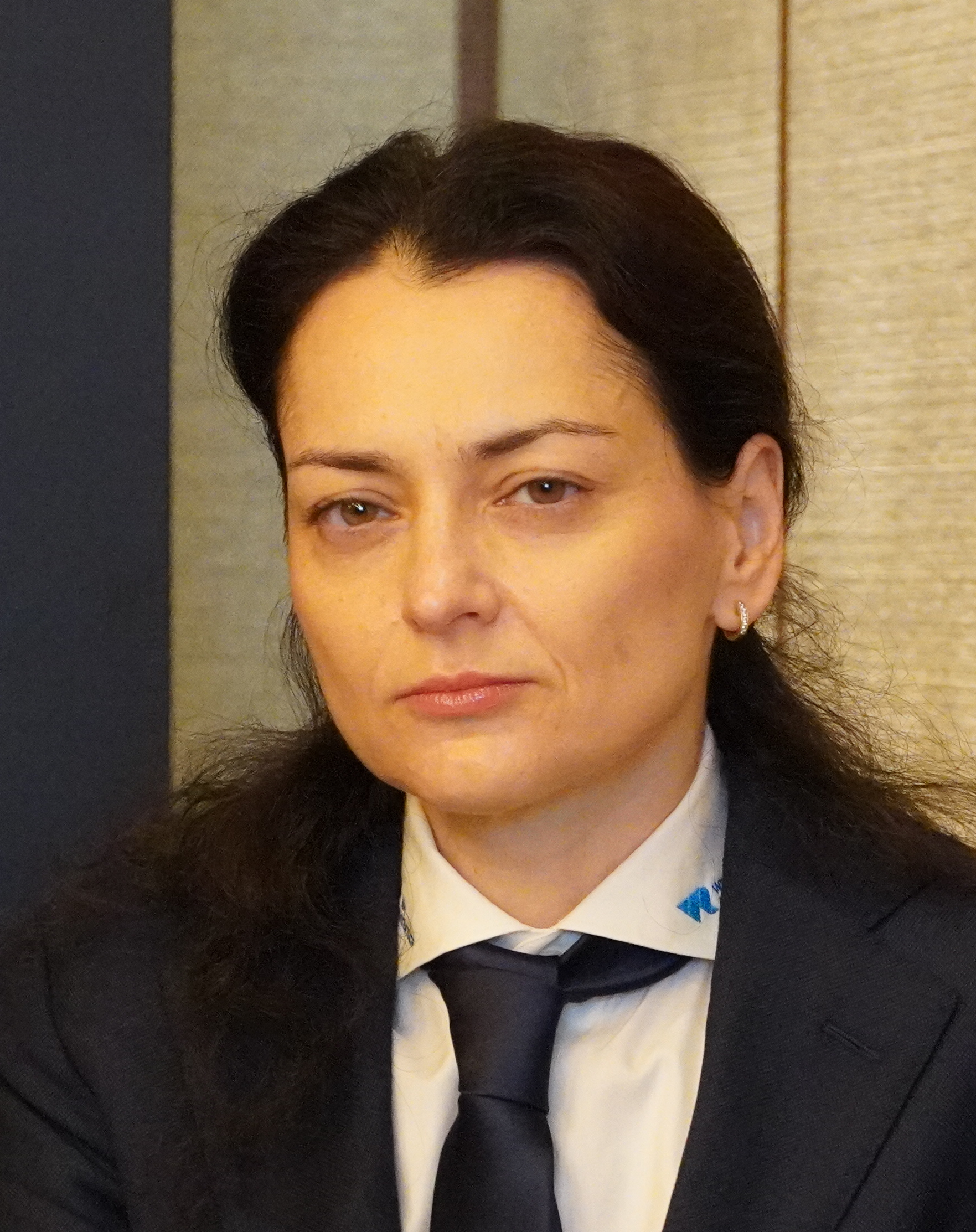
Former World Champion and World no. 12 Alexandra Kosteniuk played on board one for Switzerland

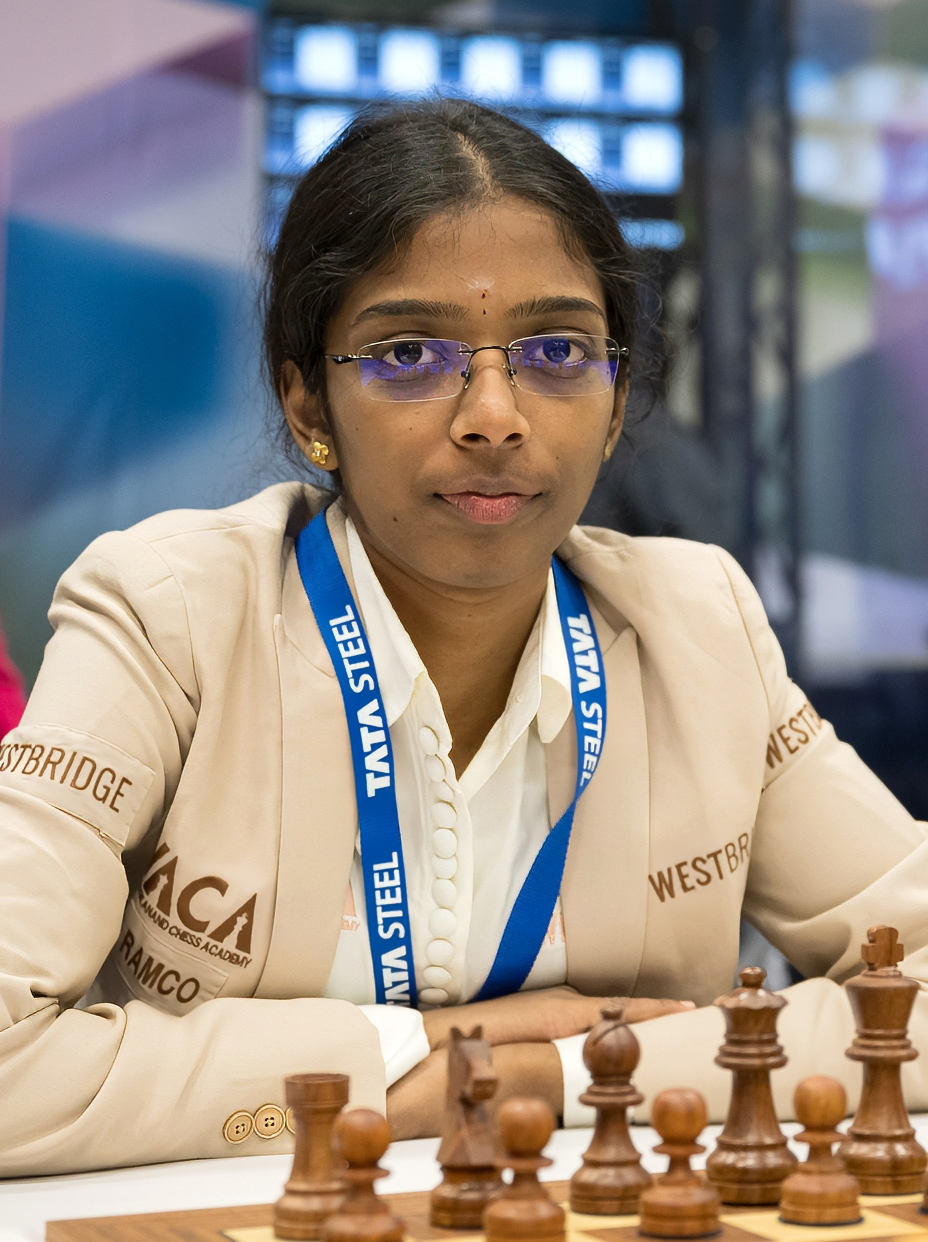
World Championship Challenger Vaishali Rameshbabu played on board two for India

== Rounds ==
=== Round 1 ===
Wilson vs. Sivanandan

Position: a8 black rook, e8 black king, h8 black rook, c7 black queen, d7 black knight, f7 black pawn, g7 black pawn, a6 black pawn, c6 black pawn, d6 black bishop, e6 black pawn, f6 black knight, g6 black pawn, b5 black pawn, d4 white pawn, e4 white pawn, f4 white pawn, b3 white queen, c3 white knight, d3 white bishop, g3 white pawn, a2 white pawn, b2 white pawn, d2 white bishop, h2 white pawn, a1 white rook, d1 white king, h1 white rook

This is the position after White played 15. e4? (15. a4! would have kept the position roughly equal), which allowed Black to launch a decisive attack with 15... c5! 16. dxc5 Nc5 17. Qc2 Rd8! 18. Be3 Nd3 19. Qxd3 Bb4! 20. Qc2 Qc4! and Wilson resigned after 27 moves.

The favourites did not have serious problems in the opening round, and most of the matches ended with either a 4–0 or a 3½–½ victory. Nine of the ten top-seeded teams recorded clean sweeps, including defending champions India, Georgia, Kazakhstan, China and United States against Dominican Republic, Tunisia, Botswana, Zambia and Andorra, respectively. Tenth seeds Germany conceded a full point to Malta after Dinara Wagner was under pressure against Oana Pulpan on the top board and Hanna Marie Klek could have lost her game against Milena Stagno. Both games were eventually drawn.

Despite the dominant team performances by the favourites, not everything went smooth on the individual boards, and there were many tight games that turned well for the higher-rated players. Armenian Elina Danielian survived a worse position against Tian Yi Liu of Hong Kong, while Uzbek Umida Omonova turned around a lost position and defeated Zara La Fleur of Trinidad and Tobago. Three-time individual gold medalist at the Chess Olympiads Pia Cramling led Sweden to a perfect victory over Haiti, while 11-year-old Bodhana Sivanandan inspired England's 4–0 sweep of Barbados with a convincing win with the Black pieces against Hannah Wilson (see diagram).

=== Round 2 ===
Javakhishvili vs. Milović

Position: b8 black rook, d8 black rook, f8 black king, b7 black pawn, c7 white rook, d7 white pawn, e7 black queen, f7 black pawn, g7 black pawn, h7 black pawn, a6 black pawn, b5 black bishop, b4 white queen, b3 white rook, f3 white bishop, a2 white pawn, f2 white pawn, g2 white pawn, g1 white king

In this position, Javakhishvili played 44. Bxb7?? (44. Qf4! was winning) and enabled Black to force a simplification through 44... Qxb4! 45. Rxb4 Rxd7 46. Rc8+ Rxc8 47. Bxc8 Rd1 48. Kh2 that resulted in a favourable position with material advantage. Milović converted the endgame after 72 moves.

The favourites scored victories in most matches of the second round, which saw some of strongest players playing their first games. Afruza Khamdamova of Uzbekistan and Carissa Yip of the United States debuted on board one and led their teams to 4–0 sweeps of Ecuador and Belgium, respectively. Ukraine and Azerbaijan also whitewashed Lithuania and Denmark, respectively, while defending champions India and China conceded half a point to Finland and Colombia, respectively, after Vaishali Rameshbabu and Song Yuxin were held to a draw on board one in both matches. Bibissara Assaubayeva played a 59-move draw with the Black pieces against Milana Babić on the top board, but Kazakhstan comfortably defeated Bosnia and Herzegovina with a 3–1 scoreline.

The main upset in the second round was Georgia's tie against Montenegro in a match with four decisive games. Nana Dzagnidze and Meri Arabidze scored full points for Georgia on the top and the last boards, while Bella Khotenashvili lost to Alena Skvortsova and Lela Javakhishvili was beaten by Aleksandra Milović on the second and third boards, respectively. Skvortsova sacrificed a pawn for the attack in a double-edged position and outplayed Khotenashvili. Javakihishvili had a winning position against Milović in a game that she only needed to draw to secure the match victory for her team. However, the Georgian was not able to find the winning queen move and made a blunder by capturing a pawn, which immediately resulted in a major simplification after which she ended up in a worse position with a material disadvantage (see diagram). Other surprising results were Czech Republic's tie against the United Arab Emirates wherein Joanna Worek lost to Alserkal Rouda Essa on board one after blundering a piece, and Slovakia's minimal 2½–1½ loss to Tajikistan due to Viktoria Nadzamova's loss with the Black pieces against Rukhshona Saidova on board three in a game she could have won with a queen sacrifice.

=== Round 3 ===
Sebag vs Mohammadi

Position: f8 black bishop, g8 black king, b7 black bishop, d7 black rook, f7 black pawn, g7 black pawn, a6 black pawn, f6 black knight, h6 black pawn, e5 black queen, f5 white knight, a4 white pawn, b4 black pawn, g4 white queen, b3 white pawn, h3 white pawn, f2 white pawn, g2 white pawn, d1 white rook, e1 white bishop, f1 white bishop, g1 white king

After 38 moves, Black already had a better position when White launched a faulty attack in the time trouble by playing 39. Nxh6??, which was followed by 39... Kh7 and the final mistake 40. Nxf7?? (40. Rxd7! Nxg4 41. Nxg4 Qxe1 42. Rxb7 f5 43. Rf7! fxg4 44. Rxf8 would have been drawish). Sebag resigned after 40... Nxg4!, which leads to heavy material losses after 41. Nxe5 Rxd1 42. hxg4 Rxe1.

A total of 20 teams scored their third match victories and remained perfect after three rounds. The top-seeded Indian team cruised to a 3½–½ victory over Greece. The only undecided game was played on board two, where Divya Deshmukh was held to a draw by Anastasia Avramidou. On the top board, Koneru Humpy built a strong position in her game with the White pieces against Stavroula Tsolakidou, which she managed to successfully convert, overcoming the loss in a winning position against the same opponent just a week earlier. The United States impressively beat Cuba with the same scoreline thanks to wins on the top three boards. Carissa Yip won a pawn in the opening and converted her material advantage with a confident play in the rest of the game. Bibisara Assaubayeva drew her second game in a row, but Kazakhstan defeated Slovenia 3½–½ with wins on the lower three boards. Zhu Jiner made her debut at the Olympiad with a win over Ekaterina Atalik on board one and Song Yuxin scored the second full point on board two in China's 3–1 victory against Turkey, whereas Lu Miaoyi found a repetition to survive a lost position against Gulenay Aydin and Yan Tianqi managed to save her game with Ceren Tirpan. The hosts Uzbekistan defeated Indonesia with a 3–1 scoreline with wins on the lower boards. Amongst the favourites, Poland scored the most crushing victory in this round by sweeping Latvia 4–0.

The biggest surprise of the round was Argentina's strong performance in their dominant 3½–½ victory over Ukraine. Ernestina Adam beat Tetyana Skarbarchuk in only 18 moves on the lowest board, and Anapaola Borda Rodas scored the second full point for the Argentine team with the White pieces on the third board, leaving the Ukrainian team in a must-win position on the top two boards. However, Nataliya Buksa seemed to be overpressing and eventually lost her game on the second board, and former Women's World Champion Anna Ushenina spoiled a winning position and settled for a consolation draw with Candela Francisco on the top board. Another surprising result was Iran's 3–1 victory over France thanks to wins on the highest two boards, but the French team could have easily lost without points as the Iranians also had winning positions on the lower boards. On board two, Marie Sebag lost control over her game against Melika Mohammadi by launching a deficient attack in the time trouble and committed the final mistake on move 40 with only six seconds on the clock (see diagram). Other lower-ranked teams that upset stronger opponents were Austria and Estonia that tied their matches with the Netherlands and Switzerland, respectively. Austria's key win came on board three, where Chiara Polterauer defeated Machteld van Foreest, while Margareth Olde scored Estonia's full point against Mariia Manko on board two.

=== Round 4 ===
Omonova vs Borda Rodas

Position: a8 black rook, h8 black king, b7 black pawn, f7 black pawn, a6 black pawn, e6 black bishop, g6 black rook, h6 white bishop, h5 white rook, d4 white rook, g3 white pawn, a2 white pawn, b2 white pawn, g2 white pawn, g1 white king

In this position, Borda Rodas played 34... Rg4? (34... Kg8 would have given Black chances to hold a draw), allowing Omonova to continue with 35.Be3+! Kg7 36.Rxg4 Bxg4 37.Rg5+ and win a piece, after which she resigned on the spot.

There were no major upsets on the top ten boards, where the favourites snatched their fourth match wins. Uzbekistan defeated Argentina 3–1 with wins by Gulrukhbegim Tokhirjonova as Black on board two and Umida Omonova as White on board three. Omonova scored her fourth consecutive win at the Olympiad. She was pressing in much of the game, but her opponent Anapaola Borda Rodas was defending accurately until she blundered a piece in an attempt to simplify the position (see diagram). The United States convincingly beat Spain 3½–½ thanks to wins by Carissa Yip, Alice Lee and Tatev Abrahamyan. Abrahamyan scored the first full point after Monica Calzetta Ruiz messed up in the opening and dropped a pawn. Yip defeated Marta García Martín in a rook endgame on the first board, while Lee extended the perfect score to 4 out of 4 by winning her game against Sabrina Vega with a pair of connected passed pawns in the centre. India secured a 3–1 victory over Mongolia with wins by Divya Deshmukh and Savitha Shri Baskar on the third and fourth boards, respectively, and draws on the first two boards. Savitha retained the perfect score with her fourth consecutive win at the Olympiad. On the chances to retain the title from the previous Olympiad, Divya told FIDE:

It will be the first for India. It was our first last time that we won, and it will be the first if we defend it!

Kazakhstan beat Armenia with the same scoreline thanks to victories by Bibisara Assaubayeva on board one and Elnaz Kaliakhmet, who remained perfect with 4 wins out of 4 games, on board four. China sealed a 3½–½ victory against Hungary with wins by Zhu Jiner, Song Yuxin and Lu Miaoyi.

The second seeds Georgia tied their second match at the Olympiad after all four games against Austria were drawn. Other upsets in the fourth round are the ties in the matches between Singapore and Greece, Costa Rica and Sweden, Bolivia and Canada as well as Algeria and Finland. In the other matches where teams seized their fourth victories, Bulgaria and Serbia clinched 3½–½ wins against Romania and Iran, respectively, Germany overcame Israel 3–1 and Azerbaijan edged out England 2½–1½.

=== Round 5 ===
Kamalidenova vs Klek

Position: a8 black bishop, d8 black queen, f8 black rook, g8 black king, c7 black pawn, e7 black bishop, f7 black pawn, g7 black knight, h7 black pawn, g6 black pawn, h6 white bishop, b5 white queen, d5 black pawn, e5 white pawn, c3 white pawn, f3 white bishop, d2 white knight, f2 white pawn, g2 white pawn, h2 white pawn, a1 white rook, g1 white king

This is the position in which Klek played 22... Bg5? in order to get rid of White's bishop h6, which was followed by 23. Rxg8! Qxa8 24. Bxg5 Qa1+ 25. Nf1 Qxc3 26. Bxd5 Nf5 27. e6! and Kamalidenova won after 31 moves. Instead, 22... c6 would have left Black with a playable position.

Only four teams—Poland, China, Kazakhstan and Azerbaijan—have a perfect score of five match victories after five rounds. One of the key matches in this round was the clash between the defending champions India and Poland wherein the Polish team pulled off the surprise of the round by stunning India with a narrow 2½–1½ victory. Koneru Humpy could not beat Oliwia Kiołbasa on board one, while Divya Deshmukh and Vantika Agrawal also settled for draws against Klaudia Kulon and Monika Soćko, respectively, on boards two and four. The decisive game in the match was played between Aleksandra Maltsevskaya as White and Vaishali Rameshbabu on the second board. In a complex position arising from the London System, both sides found it difficult to generate active play, and Vaishali created a number of pawn weaknesses. The game was balanced for a long time, but Black's weak pawns proved to be the decisive disadvantage in the endgame. This was Poland's third consecutive match victory against India in the Women's event at the Chess Olympiad after they had previously won their matchups in 2022 and 2024. China defeated Bulgaria 3–1 with convincing wins from Zhu Jiner, who scored her third full point in three games, on the first board and Song Yuxin on the second board, while the games on the other two boards ended in a draw. Azerbaijan beat Serbia with the same scoreline, but the wins occurred on the lower boards. Kazakhstan and Germany were expected to split the points, but the decisive moment happened on board three, where Meruert Kamalidenova capitalised on a single mistake by Hanna Marie Klek to secure a minimal 2½–1½ victory for her team. Kamalidenova as White had a good position, which was not sufficient for more than a draw. Nevertheless, her opponent committed a decisive mistake in an attempt to get rid of White's annoying bishop, immediately allowing a tactical shot that saw Kamalidenova with two bishops against a rook, which the Kazakh successfully converted (see diagram).

Uzbekistan and the United States exchanged one win on the top two boards in an entertaining 2–2 tie. At one point, it seemed that the American team is going to lose the match since Carissa Yip was lost on the top board and Rose Atwell had a difficult position on the last board. However, Atwell's game turned around and even her opponent had to draw by perpetual check, while Alice Lee extended her winning streak to five games with a win over Gulrukhbegim Tokhirjonova on the second board. Georgia edged past Indonesia with a narrow 2½–1½ victory thanks to victories by Bella Khotenashvili and Meri Arabidze on the third and fourth boards, respectively, whereas Nana Dzagnidze lost to Diajeng Theresa Singgih on the first board. Ukraine snatched the match win against Austria with the same scoreline with only one decisive game in which Nataliya Buksa outplayed Chiara Polterauer with the Black pieces. France scored a solid 3½–½ victory with wins on boards two, three and four, whereas Deimantė Cornette drew her game as Black against Lucia Sevcikova on the first board.

=== Round 6 ===
Nurman vs Mammadzada

Position: e8 black rook, g8 black king, a7 black pawn, c7 black pawn, f7 black pawn, d6 black pawn, h6 black pawn, c5 black bishop, g5 black pawn, c4 white rook, d3 white pawn, h3 white pawn, a2 white pawn, b2 white pawn, f2 white pawn, g2 white pawn, e1 white bishop, f1 white king

In this position, Black made the decisive mistake by playing 28... Re6?? (28... Bb6 followed by 29... Re6 was the correct order of moves) and, after 29. a4!, had to sacrifice a pawn with 29... c6 in order to save the bishop. The game continued with 30. b4 Bb6 31. Rxc6, and White converted the material advantage after 39 moves.

There were no major upsets in the sixth round. China and Kazakhstan remained the only with teams with perfect 12 match points after six rounds. The Chinese team dominated Poland with a 3½–½ victory with wins on all but the top board, where Zhu Jiner managed to escape from a worse position against Oliwia Kiołbasa. Zhu opened the game with the Sicilian Defence and faced problems right out of the opening as she was unable to castle and trapped in a position with almost no moves. However, a wrong king move by Kiołbasa let her opponent the opportunity to free her position and draw the game. On the second board, Aleksandra Maltsevskaya misplayed a sharp position and lost the game to Song Yuxin, while 16-year-old Lu Miaoyi demonstrated a strong technique in a rook-and-knight endgame and outplayed Klaudia Kulon with the Black pieces on the third board. Kazakhstan minimally defeated Azerbaijan 2½–1½ thanks to Alua Nurman's win over Gunay Mammadzada on the second board, whereas the games on the other three boards ended peacefully. Nurman as White achieved a slightly better position in the endgame, but Black could hold the draw with a careful play. But a wrong rook move from Mammadzada costed her a pawn in order to save the bishop, and the material advantage proved decisive for the outcome (see diagram).

India recovered from the loss in the previous round by beating the United States 3–1 with wins on the bottom two boards where Vantika and Savitha earned full points against Irina Krush and Rose Atwell, respectively. On the top boards, Koneru Humpy played a rock-solid draw against Carissa Yip, and Divya Deshmukh ended Alice Lee's five-game winning streak. Georgia scored a clear 3½–½ victory over the hosts Uzbekistan with wins by Nino Batsiashvili, Bella Khotenashvili and Lela Javakhishvili.

In the other matches involving strong teams, Ukraine and Germany pulled off 2½–1½ victories with only one decisive game against England and Romania, respectively. France whitewashed Vietnam, and Bulgaria scored another perfect victory thanks to Israel's forfeit. The Netherlands and Serbia tied their matches with lower-rated Slovenia and Turkey, respectively, while Mongolia, Armenia and Switzerland are the lowest-seeded tams in the pack of eleven teams chasing the two leaders after six rounds following their 3–1 victories over Iran, Latvia and Italy, respectively.

=== Round 7 ===
Savitha vs Schulze

Position: a6 black rook, f6 black knight, b5 white rook, h5 black pawn, f4 black king, f3 white knight, h3 white pawn, g2 white pawn, h2 white king

Chess engines show that this position is holdable for Black. However, Schulze did not find the correct continuation with 60... Rd6 and went for 60... Ra2?, enabling White to manoeuvre with the knight and win Black's h-pawn with 61. Nd4 Ke4 62. Nf5 Nd5 63. Ng3+.

The central match of this round was the clash between China and Kazakhstan as the only teams with perfect scores, which ended in a 2–2 tie even though the Kazakh team seemed to have better chances to score an overall victory. The games on the higher boards between Zhu Jiner and Bibisara Assaubayeva as well as Alua Nurman and Song Yixin. Nurman had winning chess in the endgame, but the chances slipped away and the game was drawn. On the lowest board, Tianqi Yan messed up early in the game and allowed Elnaz Kaliakhmet to launch a massive attack. Tianqi fought to hold the game, but the Kazakh managed to win. The Chinese bounced back with a win from Lu Miaoyi, who moved to 6 out of 7, against Meruert Kamalidenova on the third board. Kamalidenova had full control of the light-squared long diagonal and created threats in a sharp middlegame, but a series of inaccuracies from her side enabled Lu to deal with the threats and develop a decisive attack on the kingside.

India scored a commanding 3½–½ victory over Germany with wins by Koneru Humpy, Divya Deshmukh and Savitha Shri Baskar. Koneru gradually built her advantage and won her game with the Black pieces on the top board, while Divya scored the second win for India with the Black pieces after her opponent Hanna Marie Klek made several natural-looking but inaccurate moves that costed her the game. Savitha achieved the third full point for India and moved to perfect 6 out of 6 after Lara Schulze played an incorrect move in an endgame position that was holdable according to the chess engines (see diagram). Vaishali Rameshbabu and Elisabeth Pähtz split the point on the second board in the only undecided game of the match. Georgia narrowly defeated Poland 2½–1½ thanks to wins by Nino Batsiashvili over Aleksandra Maltsevskaya and Lela Javakhishvili over Klaudia Kulon despite Nana Dzagnidze's loss to Oliwia Kiołbasa on board one. Uzbekistan produced a dominant 3½–½ victory against Slovenia, powered by wins from Afruza Khamdamova, Gulrukhbegim Tokhirjonova and Guldona Karimova on boards one, two and four, with Khamadova winning a fine attacking game against Laura Unuk on the first board.

One of the surprises of this round was Bulgaria's 3–1 victory over Ukraine thanks to wins by Beloslava Krasteva and Gabriela Antova on the lower two boards. The United States beat Switzerland 3–1 with wins by Tatev Abrahamyan and Carissa Yip, who was victorious in a wild game against former Women's World Champion Alexandra Kosteniuk, Armenia edged out Azerbaijan 2½–1½ with wins by veterans Lilit Mkrtchian and Elina Danielian, while France were upset by Mongolia with the same scoreline wherein Khishigbaatar Bayasgalan as Black won the only decisive against Sophie Milliet.

=== Round 8 ===
Zhai vs Javakhishvili

Position: b8 black rook, f8 black rook, g8 black king, d7 white bishop, e7 black queen, f7 black pawn, g7 black pawn, h7 black pawn, d6 black bishop, d5 white queen, f5 black pawn, g5 white rook, f4 white pawn, a3 white pawn, e3 white bishop, b2 white pawn, f2 white king, c1 white rook

This is the position after 24. Kf2!, offering the bishop as a trap that Black fell into with 24... Qxd7??, which was followed by 25. Bd4! g6 26. Rxg6+!! hxg6 27. Rh1 Rxb2 28. Bxb2 Bc5+ 29. Kg3 and Javakhishvili resigned as the mate on h8 is inevitable.

China grabbed the sole lead after eight rounds thanks to a minimal 2½–1½ victory over Georgia. The match was decided with a spectacular win scored by Zhai Mo with the White pieces against Lela Javakhishvili. Zhai capitalised on a blunder by the Georgian, who captured a poisoned piece in a complicated position and let her create a mating net with a rook sacrifice (see diagram). Bella Khotenashvili was the only player on the Georgian team with some chances to equalise the match score, but Lu Miaoyi survived the scare by giving up two pawns and a bishop to build a fortress. The match between Kazakhstan and India ended in a 2–2 draw. Savitha Shri Baskar scored her seventh consecutive win at the Olympiad by beating Elnaz Kaliakhmet with the White pieces on board four, which offset Vaishali Rameshbabu's loss as White to Alua Nurman on board two.

Mongolia and Armenia joined Kazakhstan with a one-point deficit behind the leaders China following their 2½–1½ wins against Bulgaria and the United States, respectively. Both matches were decided by a single win with the White pieces from Törmönkhiin Mönkhzul over Nadya Toncheva on the second board for the Mongolian team and Elina Danielian over Irina Krush on the third board for the Armenian team. Armenia's win could have been more convincing given that Carissa Yip was in a big trouble for most of the game with Lilit Mkrtchian and Tatev Abrahamyan survived in the game with Susanna Gaboyan after the latter made a mistake that simplified the position to a draw. Uzbekistan scored a commanding 3–1 against the Netherlands with wins by Afruza Khamdamova, Nilufarkhon Imomkuzieva and Guldona Karimova on boards one, three and four, whereas the only point for the Dutch team was won by Peng Zhaoqin on board two. Greece produced an upset by edging out Ukraine 2½–1½ with wins with the White pieces by Stavroula Tsolakidou and Maria Tsakona against Anastasiia Hnatyshyn and Nataliya Buksa, respectively, on the first and third board. Anastasiya Rakhmangulova won the only game in the match for the Ukrainian team on the last board, and Anna Ushenina was held to a draw on the second board.

=== Round 9 ===
Lu vs Danielian

Position: c8 black rook, g8 black king, e7 black queen, g7 black bishop, e6 black pawn, g6 white queen, b5 black pawn, d5 black pawn, e5 white pawn, g5 white knight, d4 white pawn, f2 white pawn, h2 white pawn, a1 white rook, h1 white king

White is winning in this position and has several options to finish the game, but Lu went for the most efficient 36.Ra7!, deflecting the Black queen from the pawn on e6, and after 36... Qxa7 37. Qxe6+ Danielian resigned (37... Kf8 38. Nh7# or 37... Kh8 38. Qxc8+ Bf8 39. Qxf8#).

In the ninth round, China extended their lead on top of the standings to two match points ahead of India, Kazakhstan and Mongolia after defeating Armenia 3–1, thus avenging the loss to the same opponent in the fifth round of the previous Olympiad. The victory was powered by wins with the White pieces on boards one and three where Zhu Jinner and Lu Miaoyi beat Lilit Mkrtchian and Elina Danielian, respectively. Lu achieved winning advantage by demonstrating strong tactical skills that let her with different options on how to finish the game, but she opted for a spectacular rook sacrifice that deflected the opponent's queen (see diagram). Zhu won her game later after gradually grinding Mkrtchian.

India cruised to a 3–1 victory over Uzbekistan with wins by Divya Deshmukh and Vantika Agrawal on the middle boards and remained undefeated in the tournament. Mongolia pulled off an upset and tied Kazakhstan 2–2. The Mongolian team opened the match with a 2–0 thanks to wins on the lower boards, but the Kazakhs fought back after Bibisara Assaubayeva as Black defeated Bat-Erdene Mungunzul on the top board and then Alua Nurman equalised by squeezing out a victory as White against Törmönkhiin Mönkhzul on board two in a game that seemed to be a dead draw. Another surprising outcome occurred in the matchup involving Georgia and Greece, in which all games where decisive and both teams exchanged wins with the White pieces. However, the biggest surprise in this round was perhaps Indonesia's narrow 2½–1½ win over Germany wherein the Indonesians achieved full points on boards two and three.

In the other encounters on the top match boards, Poland edged past Cuba 2½–1½ and France overcame Serbia with the same scoreline, while Vietnam upset Bulgaria with a convincing 3½–½ victory. The United States defeated Canada 3–1 with wins from Carissa Yip and Irina Krush both as White on boards one and three, and Azerbaijan swept Czech Republic with a crushing 4–0 scoreline.

=== Round 10 ===
Guichard vs Kaliakhmet

Position: b7 black king, c7 black rook, f7 white rook, b6 black pawn, a4 white pawn, d4 white bishop, b3 white king

In this position, Guichard overlooked that her rook was hanging and 89. Kb4?? (89. Rf4 or 89. Rf1 would have resulted in a technical win according to the computers). Kaliakhmet won after 98 moves.

The penultimate featured the clash between the leaders China and the defending champions India, which ended in a 2–2 tie with one win for each side on the lower boards. Zhu Jiner and Humpy Koneru drew on the top board, as well as Song Yuxin and Divya Deshmukh on the second board. The game between Lu Miaoyi and Vantika Agrawal on board three was equal for a long period of time and the Indian was defending a slightly inconvenient position, but several inaccuracies left her in problems and she eventually lost the game. However, Savitha Shri Baskar fought back by defeating Zhai Mo to secure a draw for his team and moved her individual score to 8½ out of 9.

Kazakhstan narrowly defeated France 2½–1½ and reduced the deficit behind China to one match point. On board one, Bibisara Assaubayeva beat Deimante Daulyte-Cornette to score the first full point for the Kazakh team after winning an endgame with a rook and two minor pieces against two rooks, while the game between Marie Sebag and Alua Nurman on board two ended in a draw. While the chances for winning the encounter were on France's side as both Sophie Milliet and Pauline Guichard had huge advantage in their games against Meruert Kamalidenova and Elnaz Kaliakhmet, respectively, on the lower boards, only Milliet was able to convert her advantage and score the only for the French team in the match. After Kaliakhmet had blocked a check in an attempt to exchange rooks and get to a drawn endgame, Guichard blundered a full rook and passed the advantage to her opponent (see diagram). The resulting position might have been holding with perfect play, but the French made another blunder a few moves later and allowed Kazakhstan to snatch the match victory.

Poland and Vietnam joined India the chasing group with a two-point deficit behind China. The Polish team defeated Mongolia 3–1 thanks to wins with the White pieces by Aleksandra Maltsevskaya and Alicja Śliwicka on boards two and four, while Oliwia Kiołbasa drew with Bat-Erdene Mungunzul on board one and Klaudia Kulon drew against Khishigbaatar Bayasgalan. Vietnam edged past Indonesia 2½–1½ with wins by Võ Thị Kim Phụng and Lương Phương Hạnh. In the other matches involving strong teams, Georgia narrowly defeated England 2½–1½, the United States swept Israel 4–0 and Slovenia surprised Azerbaijan with a commanding 3½–½ win.

=== Round 11 ===
Humpy vs Dzagnidze

Position: c8 black rook, d8 black rook, g8 black king, a7 black pawn, f7 black pawn, g7 black pawn, a6 black bishop, b6 black pawn, c6 black knight, e6 black pawn, h6 black pawn, d5 black queen, e5 white pawn, d4 white pawn, e4 white knight, h4 white pawn, h3 white rook, a2 white pawn, d2 white queen, f2 white pawn, g2 white pawn, b1 white bishop, d1 white rook, e1 white king

This is the position after Black played 18... Rfd8?, opening the f8 square for the king. Humpy responded with 19... Nf6+! and, after the forced 19... gxf6, she continued with 20. Qxh6. Dzagnidze resigned after 20... Qa5+ 21.Rd2 Nxe5 22.Bh7+! Kh8 23.Bf5+! Kg8 24.Rg3+!.

China scored a commanding 3–1 victory against Vietnam thanks to wins by Zhu Jiner and Lu Miaoyi with the White pieces on boards one and three, which also helped them win the individual gold medals on the respective boards. Kazakhstan won the silver medal after drawing Poland in a match with one win for each side. Aleksandra Maltsevskaya scored a full point for Poland by defeating Alua Nurman with the Black pieces on the second board, while Elnaz Kaliakhmet as White scored the win for the Kazakh team on the lowest board and went on to win the individual gold medal on that board. India finished third and took the bronze medal following a 2–2 tie with Georgia. The two decisive games were played on the higher boards. Koneru Humpy beat Nana Dzagnidze on board one with a stunning tactics, involving a knight sacrifice, after the Georgian played an imprecise move (see diagram). However, Georgia bounced back with Bella Khotenashvili's win over Divya Deshmukh on board two. Armenia, the United States and Mongolia were all victorious against Uzbekistan, Romania and Greece, respectively, and joined India and Poland with the same match points in the final standings, but the Indian team won the tie-breaker.

== Final standings ==
China won the gold medal in the Women's event with a total of 20 match points, which was their seventh title in the Chess Olympiads. They remained undefeated in the tournament, having scored nine wins and two draws. Despite missing its highest-rated players, the rejuvenated Chinese team demonstrated strong performance and defeated Georgia and Poland, while drawing top-seeds India and Kazakhstan, on the way to the title. Kazakhstan won the silver medal with 18 match points (seven wins and four draws) and was the second team that remained undefeated throughout the tournament. A group of five teams—India, the United States, Poland, Armenia and Mongolia—finished with 17 match points, but the Indian team had the best tie-breaker and completed the podium. Georgia, Vietnam, Slovenia and Turkey rounded up the top ten, each scoring 16 match points.

The highest performance rating of 2638 in the Women's event was achieved by China's Zhu Jiner, who played on the top board, and scored 7 out of a possible 9 points (five wins and four draws). Individual gold medals were also won by Alice Lee with 8½ out of 10 and a performance rating of 2572, Lu Miaoyi of China with 9½ out of 11 and a performance rating of 2576, Elnaz Kaliakhmet of Kazakhstan with 7½ out of 9 and a performance rating of 2486, and Savitha Shri Baskar of India with 9 out of 10 and a performance rating of 2569. American Carissa Yip had the second highest performance rating of 2601, which earned her the silver medal on board one, after scoring 8 out of 10 (seven wins, two draws and one loss).

Final standings
| # | Country | Players | Average rating | MP | dSB^{†} |
|---|---|---|---|---|---|
| 1st place, gold medalist(s) | China | Zhu Jiner, Song Yuxin, Lu Miaoyi, Yan Tianqi, Zhai Mo | 2429 | 20 | |
| 2nd place, silver medalist(s) | Kazakhstan | Assaubayeva, Nurman, Kamalidenova, Kaliakhmet, Nurgaliyeva | 2438 | 18 | |
| 3rd place, bronze medalist(s) | India | Koneru, Vaishali, Divya, Vantika, Savitha | 2466 | 17 | 424.0 |
| 4 | United States | Carissa Yip, Lee, Krush, Abrahamyan, Atwell | 2415 | 17 | 418.0 |
| 5 | Poland | Kiołbasa, Maltsevskaya, Kulon, Soćko, Śliwicka | 2369 | 17 | 381.0 |
| 6 | Armenia | Mkrtchian L., Mkrtchyan M., Danielian, Gaboyan, Mkrtchyan A. | 2322 | 17 | 369.0 |
| 7 | Mongolia | Mungunzul, Munkhzul, Bayasgalan, Munguntuul, Bayarmaa | 2324 | 17 | 331.0 |
| 8 | Georgia | Dzagnidze, Batsiashvili, Khotenashvili, Javakhishvili, Arabidze | 2451 | 16 | 360.0 |
| 9 | Vietnam | Thảo Nguyên, Kim Phụng, Thùy Dương, Phương Hạnh, Mai Hưng | 2287 | 16 | 348.0 |
| 10 | Slovenia | Unuk, Urh, Shpanko, Beber, Mihelič | 2241 | 16 | 336.0 |

Notes

- Average ratings calculated by chess-results.com based on September 2026 FIDE ratings.
- ^† The Sonneborn–Berger score is a tie-breaking criterion used to rank teams with equal match points.

All board prizes were given out according to performance ratings for players who played at least eight games at the tournament. The winners of the gold medal on each board are listed in turn:

- Board 1: (China) Zhu Jiner 2638
- Board 2: (United States) Alice Lee 2572
- Board 3: (China) Lu Miaoyi 2576
- Board 4: (Kazakhstan) Elnaz Kaliakhmet 2486
- Reserve: (India) Savitha Shri Baskar 2569

== See also ==
- Open event at the 46th Chess Olympiad
