= 46th Chess Olympiad =

2026 chess tournament in Samarkand, Uzbekistan

- Logo of the 46th Chess Olympiad
- Host city: Samarkand
- Country: Uzbekistan
- Nations: 204 (Open); 187 (Women)
- Teams: 206 (Open); 189 (Women)
- Athletes: 1,961 (1,024 in Open and 937 in Women's event)
- Dates: 15–27 September 2026
- Opened by: Viswanathan Anand
- Main venue: Silk Road International Exhibition Centre

Medalists

Team (Open)
- 1st place, gold medalist(s): Uzbekistan
- 2nd place, silver medalist(s): India
- 3rd place, bronze medalist(s): Germany

Team (Women)
- 1st place, gold medalist(s): China
- 2nd place, silver medalist(s): Kazakhstan
- 3rd place, bronze medalist(s): India

Individual (Open)
- Board 1: (Uzbekistan) Nodirbek Abdusattorov
- Board 2: (China) Wei Yi
- Board 3: (Germany) Frederik Svane
- Board 4: (Ukraine) Ihor Samunenkov
- Reserve: (Hungary) Gleb Dudin

Individual (Women)
- Board 1: (China) Zhu Jiner
- Board 2: (United States) Alice Lee
- Board 3: (China) Lu Miaoyi
- Board 4: (Kazakhstan) Elnaz Kaliakhmet
- Reserve: (India) Savitha Shri Baskar

Gaprindashvili Trophy
- India

The 46th Chess Olympiad (Uzbek: 46-шахмат Олимпиадаси, romanized: 46-shaxmat Olimpiadasi) was an international team chess event held in Samarkand, Uzbekistan, from 15 to 27 September 2026. It was organised by the International Chess Federation (FIDE) and consisted of two main tournaments: an Open event for players of all genders, and a Women's event for female players only. The associated Chess Olympiad for People with Disabilities and FIDE Congress took place at the same time and venue. There were also several outreach events to promote chess.

There were 1,961 total participants: 1,024 in the Open event and 937 in the Women's event. They were organised into 206 teams from 204 nations in the Open section, and 189 teams from 187 nations in the Women's section. Each section had 11 rounds; in each round four players from each team played four players from another team. Opponents were determined using the Swiss system. The main venue was the Silk Road International Exhibition Centre. The Chief Arbiter was International Arbiter Ivan Syrovy from Slovakia.

Teams were ranked by the number of rounds they won – two points for a win and one point for a draw. Home team Uzbekistan won the gold medal in the Open event, their second title (after their first in 2022). The defending champions India won the silver medal and Germany won bronze. In the Women's event, China won gold, their seventh title and first since 2018. Kazakhstan took silver and the defending champions India won bronze.

Individual players were ranked by their performance rating. In the Open event, Uzbekistan's Nodirbek Abdusattorov had the highest rating of 2869, and scored 8½ out of 11. In the Women's event, Chinese player Zhu Jiner had the highest rating of 2638, winning 7 of 9 games she played. The best combined team rating (over both events) was by India, who received the Gaprindashvili Trophy. Chinese players won three individual board medals in both events.

At the 97th FIDE Congress, held during the Olympiad, Timur Turlov was elected new FIDE president. He replaced Arkady Dvorkovich, who withdrew from the presidential race following his inclusion on the European Union's sanction list.

== Background ==
The Chess Olympiad is a biennial chess tournament in which teams representing nations compete in an Olympic-style event. The first unofficial edition, labelled as the "Chess Olympic Games", was held in Paris in 1924, and coincided with the Summer Olympic Games that took place in the city in the same year. Despite the fact that the event was not officially part of the Olympic Games and the winners were not awarded official Olympic medals, the rules of the Olympic Games applied. The organisers of the Summer Olympics defined chess as a sport, (Note: Chess was officially recognised as a sport by the International Olympic Committee in 1999. At the 2000 Summer Olympics, a two-game exhibition match between grandmasters Vishwanathan Anand and Alexey Shirov took place, but no Olympic medals were awarded.) but demanded that only amateurs be allowed to participate, which posed a problem because it was difficult to draw a line between amateurs and professionals. The first official edition of the Chess Olympiad was held in London in 1927. Up until 1950, the tournament was organised at irregular intervals. From then on, it has been held once every two years. The first Women's Chess Olympiad took place in Emmen, Netherlands in 1957; since 1976, the Women's tournament has been held simultaneously with an Open tournament (Note: The Open tournament enables participation of players from all genders.) at the Chess Olympiads. The former Soviet Union has historically been the most successful nation with 18 gold medals won.

The bidding process for organising both the 46th Chess Olympiad and the coinciding FIDE Congress was opened in March 2022. Each city interested in hosting the event had to submit their bid to FIDE by 31 May 2022. The bids were to guarantee that all necessary provisions in accordance with the Olympiad Regulations of the FIDE Handbook would be covered by the organiser, including articles 4.1, 4.2 and 4.3 pertaining to the organising committee, finances, and provision of amenities and stipends, respectively. Uzbekistan submitted the only bid to host the event, which was unanimously approved by the FIDE General Assembly in August 2022. The decision was welcomed within the chess world. FIDE's CEO Emil Sutovsky wrote on the social media:

Uzbekistan is approved as the host of FIDE Olympiad-2026. Knowing the hospitality of Uzbeks, I am sure it will be an exceptional event. What made the moment unusual was the timing: Uzbekistan was awarded the 2026 Olympiad while its team was actively winning gold at the 2022 Olympiad. The country was simultaneously becoming a chess power and being entrusted with chess's largest event.

The Chess Federation of Uzbekistan (CFU) initially indicated that the event would take place in either Tashkent or Samarkand, pending the resolution of the venue as well as some political and organisational issues. In early 2024, it was confirmed that Samarkand would host the Olympiad at the Silk Road International Exhibition Center. It is the first Chess Olympiad to take place in Central Asia.

== Preparations ==
The FIDE regulations prescribe that the Olympiad organiser commits to financial obligations. These include a €1-million lump sum payable no later than 18 months before the event, which covers FIDE's contribution and broadcasting rights, plus a minimum of €1.5 million for travel reimbursement to federations entitled to support, as well as 50,000 euros for inspection costs. In May 2023, it was announced that the Uzbek government had allocated over US$4 million to host the Olympiad.

In March 2025, a FIDE delegation led by president Arkady Dvorkovich visited Uzbekistan as part of the preparations. The delegation participated in a session of the organisational committee held at the Ministry of Sports, where they met with the Minister of Sport Adkham Ikramov and the first deputy chairperson of the Uzbekistan Chess Federation Alisher Saʼdullayev. Dvorkovich expressed his gratitude for the "support of top-level officials, including the President of Uzbekistan, the government, the President of the Uzbekistan Chess Federation, and the Minister of Sports".

=== Support initiatives ===
In October 2025, it was announced that the ChessMom project, which was introduced in 2024 for the Budapest Chess Olympiad and aims to support professional women chess players who are mothers to continue their chess careers while caring for their young children, would continue for the Samarkand Chess Olympiad. The programme provided financial support in the amount of up to €1,000 per player (or €500 if the player comes from the same continent as the Olympiad host country), who would travel with children under the age of two, to cover the caregiver's flight ticket. FIDE announced support for ten female chess players based on their rating from highest to lowest, and support would be provided to at least one player per continent. The main difference compared to the inaugural programme for the previous Olympiad is that the age limit was increased from one to two years of age. In June 2026, the list of twelve selected participants was published with the following names: Karen Julissa Figueroa Figueroa (Barbados), Patricia Evarista Castillo Peña (Dominican Republic), Beatriz Irene Franco Valencia (Colombia), Marie Sebag (France), Bayarmaa Bayarjargal (Mongolia), Robyn Julian Klaasen (South Africa), Zenia Corrales Jiménez (Mexico), Elisabeth Pähtz (Germany), Elisabeth Hapala (Austria), Luzia Fernandes Pires (Angola), Razan Alshaeby (Jordan) and Onkemetse Linda Francis (Botswana).

In April 2026, FIDE launched a call for chess federations to apply for the Olympiad Training Support Program, which was envisioned as part of the cooperation with Freedom Holding to support developing chess nations. More than 100 federations across development levels 3, 4 and 5 were eligible to apply for the programme. Participating federations would benefit from a structured preparation programme delivered in two phases: i) an online phase, in which each team would receive up to 10 hours of training conduced by professional coaches selected by the FIDE Trainers Program, and ii) an on-site phase during the Olympiad, in which federations would receive co-financing for the presence of their assigned coach. Along with the call for federations, FIDE also launched a call for FIDE-licensed trainers interested in supporting the participating teams.

=== Venue ===
The venue for the Olympiad was the Silk Road International Exhibition Centre, which is located in the Silk Road Samarkand tourist complex. The construction of the Silk Road Samarkand tourist complex began in 2019 at the initiative of Uzbek president Shavkat Mirziyoyev. It was opened in August 2022 at a ceremony that was attended by president Mirziyoyev. The complex covers an area of 280 hectares near the Samarkand rowing canals and includes eight hotels, four boutique hotels, a congress centre and the Eternal City caravanserai. The complex houses 40 craft workshops in the traditions of the 12 regions of Uzbekistan. The project's total cost was US$580 million, and it was built with the goal to host major international events. The Silk Road International Exhibition Centre originally had an area of 4,000 m^{2}, which was expanded to 17,000 m^{2} in 2025, transforming it to a modern venue with five fully equipped conference halls. The complex has previously hosted the World Rapid and the World Blitz Chess Championship in 2023 as well as the FIDE Grand Swiss Tournament 2025.

=== Ticketing ===
There were three ticket categories for the event: (i) a single-day ticket, (ii) a family ticket and (iii) a full pass. A single-day ticket covered one round of the buyer's choice, and its price was UZS50,000 (US$4.20) for domestic visitors and UZS240,000 (US$20) for foreigners. A family ticket provided access for a family to one selected round using a single QR code, and its price was UZS80,000 (US$6.7) for domestic visitors and UZS360,000 (US$30) for foreigners. A full pass covered every round from 16 to 27 September, permitting one entry per day, and its price was UZS500,000 (US$41.70) for domestic visitors and UZS2,400,000 (US$200) for foreigners. Uzbek citizens aged 14 to 30 could get tickets free of charge. Tickets provided entry to the spectator area, exhibition hall, workshops, fan zones and interactive events. The spectator area was open from 15:00 UZB to 17:00 UZB (UTC+5:00), and visitors had to remove their phones from the hall after 15:15 UZB.

== The event ==
The torch relay began on 13 September 2026 in Bengaluru, India, where FIDE interim president Viswanathan Anand and the president of the All India Chess Federation (AICF) Nitin Narang handed the torch with the Olympic flame over to Javokhir Sindarov, who brought it to Samarkand for the event.

=== Opening ceremony ===
The opening ceremony took place on 15 September at the Boqiy Shahar Amphitheatre, an open-air venue on the banks of the Silk Road rowing channel, and it was attended by more than 2,000 spectators. More than 100 musicians and 200 dancers and signers participated in the show by presenting the Uzbek culture.

In the official part of the ceremony, the first speech was given by Uzbekistan's prime minister Abdulla Aripov addressed the audience and conveyed greetings from president Shavkat Mirzoyev. He was followed by the FIDE interim president and former five-time World Champion Vishwanathan Anand, who noted that Uzbekistan is hosting the largest team tournament in the world of chess for the first time in history. In the middle of the two-hour ceremony, the National Anthem of Uzbekistan and the FIDE Anthem were performed by the Honoured Choir of Uzbekistan and the State Choir Chapel. One notable event was the traditional drawing of colours, which determined the teams that would have the White and Black pieces on the first board in the opening round. The draw was conducted by the former Women's World Champion Zhu Chen and the former FIDE World Chess Champion Rustam Kasimdzhanov. They selected pieces of both colours from traditional boxes, and the White pieces went to the top-seeded team in the Women's event and the Black pieces to the highest-ranked team in the Open event.

The ceremony also featured theatrical and musical performances, elements of national culture, 3D visual mapping, a drone light show with images of chess pieces in the night sky and arrays of illuminations. It concluded with the performance of a pop song and a group dance on the stage with fireworks.

=== Closing ceremony ===
The closing ceremony took place at 19:00 UZB (UTC+5:00) on 27 September at the Boqiy Shahar Amphitheatre and had over 2,000 attendants. It featured the presentation of the prizes for the best teams and players, live music, traditional dance and performances.

The ceremony began with the presentation of the category prizes with medals awarded to the best teams in five different rating categories from A to E in both the Open and Women's events. The prizes were announced by the Chief Arbiter Ivan Syrovy and the chairman of the FIDE Arbiters' Commission Laurent Freyd, and they were afterwards presented by official representatives. In the Open event, these teams were the United States (A), Vietnam (B), Ecuador (C), Pakistan (D) and Qatar (E), while in the Women's event, the awarded teams were the United States (A), Croatia (B), Sri Lanka (C), Ghana (D) and the Maldives (E). The next category were the prizes for best uniforms, which were awarded to Hong Kong, Jamaica, South Africa, Saint Kitts and Nevis, Mali and South Africa. Afterwards, the individual board prizes for the players with the strongest performances across all boards were awarded, as well as the FIDE Excellence Awards in the Best Chess Player female and male categories. The awards part of the ceremony concluded with the presentation of medals to the best teams at 19:00 UZB (UTC+5:00). FIDE president-elect Turlov presented the medals to the teams that finished on the podium in the Women's event and awarded the Vera Menchik Cup to the winners China, and Uzbek prime minister and CFU chairman Aripov awarded the medals to the three best teams in the Open event and presented the Hamilton Russel Cup to the winning Uzbek team.

After the medals ceremony, the Olympiad flag was handed over from the first vice president of CFU Sadullayev to the chairman of the Abu Dhabi Chess Club and tournament director of the 47th Chess Olympiad Hussein Abdullah Al-Khoury and the Corporate Communications Office Director of the Abu Dhabi Sports Council and chairman of the Accommodation and Travel Committee for the next Chess Olympiad. The FIDE anthem was then played and FIDE president-elect Turlov delivered a speech in which he thanked Uzbekistan's president Mirzoyev for his support, expressed gratitude to prime minister Aripov for the high standard of the chess events held in Samarkand and presented the CFU with FIDE's Medal of Merit before officially declaring the Olympiad as closed.

=== Participating teams ===
The event featured 395 participating teams, representing 204 national federations. Uzbekistan as hosts fielded three teams in each of the two sections. In March 2022, after the Russian Invasion of Ukraine, FIDE imposed a ban on the National federations of Russia and Belarus, therefore Russia and Belarus did not participate in the 44th and the 45th Olympiads. In July 2026, FIDE lifted all its restrictions on the Belarus Chess Federation following International Olympic Committee's recommendation "athletes’ participation in international sport should not be limited by the actions of their governments". The ban on the Russian Chess Federation (RCF) was, however, not resolved and Russia is not permitted to participate.

==== Travel subsidies ====
In early April 2026, FIDE announced that they would extended travel subsidies to federations designated with a development level (Note: The FIDE Development Index (also known as Development Level) is a number calculated by FIDE to evaluate the current level of development of a National Chess Federation. It is calculated based on several parameters and updated yearly in January. As of January 2026, a total of 21 are designated with a development level 1, 51 with a development level 2, 71 with a development level 3, 16 with a development level 4 and 48 with a development level 5.) 3, 4 or 5, whereas federations with a development level 1 or 2 may apply for subsidies only in exceptional circumstances (e.g. remote location, poor economic situation etc.). The subsidy limits were set at €14,400 per full team for federations from Africa, €21,600 per full team for federations from the Americas, €8,400 per full team for federations from Asia, €10,800 per full team for federations from Europe and €21,600 per full team for federations from Oceania. The value of the travel subsidies was expected to reach €2 million.

Participating teams in the 46th Chess Olympiad
- Afghanistan^{b}
- Albania
- Algeria
- Andorra
- Angola
- Antigua and Barbuda
- Argentina
- Armenia
- Aruba
- Australia
- Austria
- Azerbaijan
- Bahamas
- Bahrain
- Bangladesh
- Barbados
- Belarus
- Belgium
- Belize^{a}
- Bermuda
- Bhutan
- Bolivia
- Bosnia and Herzegovina
- Botswana
- Brazil
- British Virgin Islands
- Brunei
- Bulgaria
- Burkina Faso^{a}
- Burundi
- Cambodia
- Cameroon
- Canada
- Cape Verde
- Cayman Islands
- Central African Republic
- Chad
- Chile
- China
- Chinese Taipei
- Colombia
- Comoros
- Costa Rica
- Croatia
- Cuba
- Curaçao
- Cyprus
- Czech Republic
- Democratic Republic of Congo
- Denmark
- Djibouti
- Dominica
- Dominican Republic
- Ecuador
- Egypt
- El Salvador
- England
- Equatorial Guinea
- Estonia
- Eswatini
- Ethiopia
- Faroe Islands^{a}
- Fiji
- Finland
- France
- Gabon
- The Gambia^{a}
- Georgia
- Germany
- Ghana
- Greece
- Greenland^{a}
- Grenada
- Guam
- Guatemala
- Guernsey^{a}
- Guinea
- Guyana
- Haiti
- Honduras
- Hong Kong
- Hungary
- Iceland
- India
- Indonesia
- Iran
- Iraq
- Ireland
- Isle of Man^{a}
- Israel
- Italy
- Ivory Coast
- Jamaica
- Japan
- Jersey
- Jordan
- Kazakhstan
- Kenya
- Kiribati^{a}
- Kosovo
- Kuwait^{a}
- Kyrgyzstan
- Laos
- Latvia
- Lebanon
- Lesotho
- Liberia
- Libya^{a}
- Liechtenstein
- Lithuania
- Luxembourg
- Macao^{a}
- Madagascar
- Malawi
- Malaysia
- Maldives
- Mali
- Malta
- Marshall Islands^{a}
- Mauritania
- Mauritius
- Mexico
- Moldova
- Monaco
- Mongolia
- Montenegro
- Morocco
- Mozambique
- Myanmar
- Namibia
- Nauru^{a}
- Nepal
- Netherlands
- New Caledonia^{a}
- New Zealand
- Nicaragua
- Niger
- Nigeria
- North Macedonia
- Norway
- Oman
- Pakistan
- Palau
- Palestine
- Panama
- Papua New Guinea
- Paraguay
- Peru
- Philippines
- Poland
- Portugal
- Puerto Rico
- Qatar^{a}
- Romania
- Saint Kitts and Nevis
- Saint Lucia
- Saint Vincent and the Grenadines
- San Marino
- São Tomé and Príncipe
- Saudi Arabia
- Scotland
- Senegal
- Serbia
- Seychelles
- Sierra Leone
- Singapore
- Slovakia
- Slovenia
- Solomon Islands^{a}
- Somalia
- South Africa
- South Korea
- South Sudan
- Spain
- Sri Lanka
- Sudan
- Suriname
- Sweden
- Switzerland
- Syria
- Tajikistan
- Tanzania
- Thailand
- Timor Leste
- Togo
- Tonga^{a}
- Trinidad and Tobago
- Tunisia
- Turkiye
- Turkmenistan
- Uganda
- Ukraine
- United Arab Emirates
- United States
- United States Virgin Islands
- Uruguay
- Uzbekistan (host nation)
- Uzbekistan-2
- Uzbekistan-3
- Vanuatu
- Venezuela
- Vietnam
- Wales
- Yemen
- Zambia
- Zimbabwe

Notes

^a Countries in italics denote those fielding teams in the Open event only.
^b FIDE officially recognises the flag of the Islamic Republic of Afghanistan.

=== Competition format and calendar ===
The tournament was played in a Swiss system format. The time control for all games was 90 minutes for the first 40 moves, after which an additional 30 minutes were granted; an increment of 30 seconds per move was applied from the first move. Players were permitted to offer a draw at any time. A total of 11 rounds were played, and all teams had to be paired in every round. (Note: In case of an odd number of participating teams, a bye is allocated to the eligible team with the lowest ranking prescribed.)

In each round, four players from each team faced four players from another team; teams were permitted one reserve player who could be substituted between rounds. The four games were played simultaneously on four boards with alternating colours, scoring 1 game point for a win and ½ game point for a draw. The scores from each game were then summed together to determine which team would win the round. Winning a round was worth two match points, regardless of the game point margin, while drawing a round was worth one match point. Teams are ranked in a table based on match points. Tie-breakers for the table are i) the Sonneborn–Berger system; ii) total game points scored; iii) the sum of the match points of the opponents, excluding the lowest one.

The event took from 15 to 27 September 2026. Tournament rounds began on 16 September and ended with the final round on 27 September. All rounds began at 15:00 UZB (UTC+5:00), except for the final round which began at 11:00 UZB (UTC+5:00). There was one rest day on 22 September, after the sixth round.

All times are UZB (UTC+5:00)

OC	Opening ceremony	A	Arbiters meeting	C	Captains meeting	1	Round	RD	Rest day	CC	Closing ceremony

September	15th Tue	16th Wed	17th Thu	18th Fri	19th Sat	20th Sun	21st Mon	22nd Tue	23rd Wed	24th Thu	25th Fri	26th Sat	27th Sun
Ceremonies	OC												CC
Meetings	C												
Meetings		A											
Tournament round		1	2	3	4	5	6	RD	7	8	9	10	11

=== Open event ===
The Open event was contested by a total of 1,024 players from 206 teams. It featured eight of the top ten players from the FIDE rating list published in September 2026. Former five-time World Champion and current world no. 1 Magnus Carlsen was absent the Olympiad, and Hikaru Nakamura missed his third consecutive Chess Olympiad. The hosts Uzbekistan were considered the pre-tournament favourites, while the defending champions India, the United States and China their most dangerous rivals. The Uzbek squad, captained by former FIDE World Chess Champion Rustam Kasimdzhanov, had four players that won gold and bronze at the previous two Olympiads. The team had an average FIDE rating of 2720, the third highest in the tournament; it was led by Nodirbek Abdusattorov on the first board, followed by World Championship Challenger Javokhir Sindarov on the second board, then Nodirbek Yakubboev, Shamsiddin Vokhidov and Mukhiddin Madaminov on the remaining boards. Nevertheless, the team with the highest pre-tournament average rating were the United States, consisting of Fabiano Caruana, Wesley So, Levon Aronian, Hans Niemann and Awonder Liang as a reserve player, with an average rating of 2753. Niemann and Liang made their debut at the Chess Olympiads.

The defending champions India were the second-seeded team with an average rating of 2735. Their squad captained by Srinath Narayanan included reigning World Champion and winner of the individual gold medal on the top board at the previous two Olympiads Gukesh Dommaraju on board four, as well as R Praggnanandhaa, Arjun Erigaisi and Nihal Sarin on the first three boards and Vidit Gujrathi as a reserve player. The only change from the gold-winning squad at the Budapest Olympiad was Nihal replacing Pentala Harikrishna. China, with an average rating of 2707, started the tournament as the fourth seeds. The team was led by Ding Liren on board one and saw the former World Champion's return to the Chess Olympiads, while Wei Yi, Yu Yangyi, Xu Xiangyu and Kong Xiangrui completed the squad on the remaining boards. Germany were the fifth seeds with an average rating of 2677, captained by Jan Gustafsson, with Vincent Keymer, Matthias Bluebaum, Frederik Svane, Alexander Donchenko and Rasmus Svane on the team. Other strong teams included the Netherlands, Azerbaijan, Hungary, France and Armenia.

==== Open summary ====
Nodirbek Abdusattorov of Uzbekistan achieved the highest performance rating in the Open event.

Uzbekistan won the gold medal in the Open event with a total of 20 out of 22 possible match points, thus claiming their second title after the first one won in 2022. They scored 10 match victories and suffered only one loss. On the road to the gold medal, they defeated the United States, India, China, Hungary and Armenia among others, losing only to Germany in the eighth round. India and Germany finished with 18 match points, but India won the tie-breaker to win the silver medal. The pre-tournament top-seeds the United States, Azerbaijan, Armenia and Hungary shared the fourth to seventh place with 17 points, while China finished in eighth place after being among the leaders throughout much of the tournament. France and Spain finished in ninth and tenth place, respectively, with the same match points and worse tie-breaker than China.

Nodirbek Abdusattorov, who played on the top board for the winning Uzbek team, achieved the highest performance rating of 2869 in the Open event after scoring 8½ out of a possible 11 points (six wins and five draws). On the way to the individual gold medal, he defeated the highest-rated player in the tournament Fabiano Caruana, former World Champion Ding Liren and Richárd Rapport. Individual gold medals on the other boards were won by Wei Yi of China with 7½ out of 10 and a performance rating of 2798, Frederik Svane of Germany with 8½ out of 11 and a performance rating of 2796, Ihor Samunenkov of Ukraine with 8 out of 10 and a performance rating of 2720, and Gleb Dudin of Hungary with 8 out of 10 and a performance rating of 2738. Turkish chess prodigy Yağız Kaan Erdoğmuş had the second highest performance rating of 2839 with a score of 8 out of 10 (six wins and four draws), which was enough for the silver medal on board one.

Final standings
#	Country	Players	Average rating	MP	dSB^{†}
1st place, gold medalist(s)	Uzbekistan	Abdusattorov, Sindarov, Yakubboev, Vokhidov, Madaminov	2720	20	
2nd place, silver medalist(s)	India	Praggnanandhaa, Erigaisi, Nihal, Gukesh, Vidit	2735	18	405.5
3rd place, bronze medalist(s)	Germany	Keymer, Blübaum, F. Svane, Donchenko, R. Svane	2677	18	386.5
4	United States	Caruana, So, Niemann, Aronian, Liang	2753	17	391.5
5	Azerbaijan	Mamedyarov, Suleymanli, Muradli, Mamedov, Safarli	2623	17	364.5
6	Armenia	Martirosyan, Hovhannisyan, Sargsyan, Sargissian, Petrosyan	2637	17	339.5
7	Hungary	Rapport, Leko, Gledura, Bánusz, Dudin	2652	17	320.5
8	China	Ding Liren, Wei Yi, Yu Yangyi, Xu Xiangyu, Kong Xiangrui	2707	16	374.5
9	France	Vachier-Lagrave, Bacrot, Lagarde, Maurizzi, Moussard	2638	16	366.5
10	Spain	Antón Guijarro, Chigaev, Santos Latasa, Shirov, Yuffa	2620	16	354.5

Notes

- Average ratings calculated by chess-results.com based on September 2026 FIDE ratings.
- ^† The Sonneborn–Berger score is a tie-breaking criterion used to rank teams with equal match points.

All board medals were given out according to performance ratings for players who played at least eight games at the tournament. The winners of the gold medal on each board are listed in turn:

Board	Gold	Silver	Bronze
Board 1	Nodirbek Abdusattorov; Uzbekistan	Yağız Kaan Erdoğmuş; Turkey	R Praggnanandhaa; India
Board 2	Wei Yi; China	Jorden van Foreest; Netherlands	Javokhir Sindarov; Uzbekistan
Board 3	Frederik Svane; Germany	Nodirbek Yakubboev; Uzbekistan	Shant Sargsyan; Armenia
Board 4	Ihor Samunenkov; Ukraine	Gukesh Dommaraju; India	Levon Aronian; United States
Reserve	Gleb Dudin; Hungary	Daniil Yuffa; Spain	Vladimir Hamițevici; Moldova

=== Women's event ===
The Women's event was contested by a total of 937 players from 189 teams. It featured only three of the top ten players according to the FIDE rating list published in September 2026. The top-seeded team were the defending champions India with an average pre-tournament rating of 2466. Koneru Humpy strengthened the team with her return on the first board, and the squad included Vaishali Rameshbabu, Divya Deshmukh, Vantika Agrawal and Savitha Shri Baskar. Of the gold-winning team at the previous Olympiad, Harika Dronavalli and Tania Sachdev were absent and replaced by Humpy and Savitha Shri. Georgia followed with the second highest average rating of 2451, and their balanced consists of Nana Dzagnidze, Nino Batsiashvili, Bella Khotenashvili, Lela Javakhishvili and Meri Arabidze. Kazakhstan were the third seeds with Bibisara Assaubayeva on the top board of the team that also had Alua Nurman, Meruert Kamalidenova, Elnaz Kaliakhmet and Zarina Nurgaliyeva.

The Chinese team was weaker without the world no. 1 Hou Yifan, reigning five-time World Champion Ju Wenjun, former World Champion Tan Zhongyi and Lei Tingjie, but the team still had a strong line-up with the fourth highest average pre-tournament rating, consisting of Zhu Jiner, Song Yuxin, Lu Miaoyi, Yan Tianqi and Zhai Mo. Anna and Mariya Muzychuk did not play for Ukraine, whose team was led by 16-year-old Anastasiia Hnatyshyn on board one, former World Champion Anna Ushenina on board two, as well as Nataliya Buksa, Anastasiya Rakhmangulova and Tetyana Skarbarchuk on the remaining boards. The fifth-seeded team of the United States retained Carissa Yip, Alice Lee and Irina Krush from the squad that won bronze at the previous Olympiad, Tatev Abrahamyan returned and Rose Atwell made her debut at the Chess Olympiads. Other strong teams that completed the top-ten seeds included Azerbaijan, France, Poland and Germany.

==== Women's summary ====
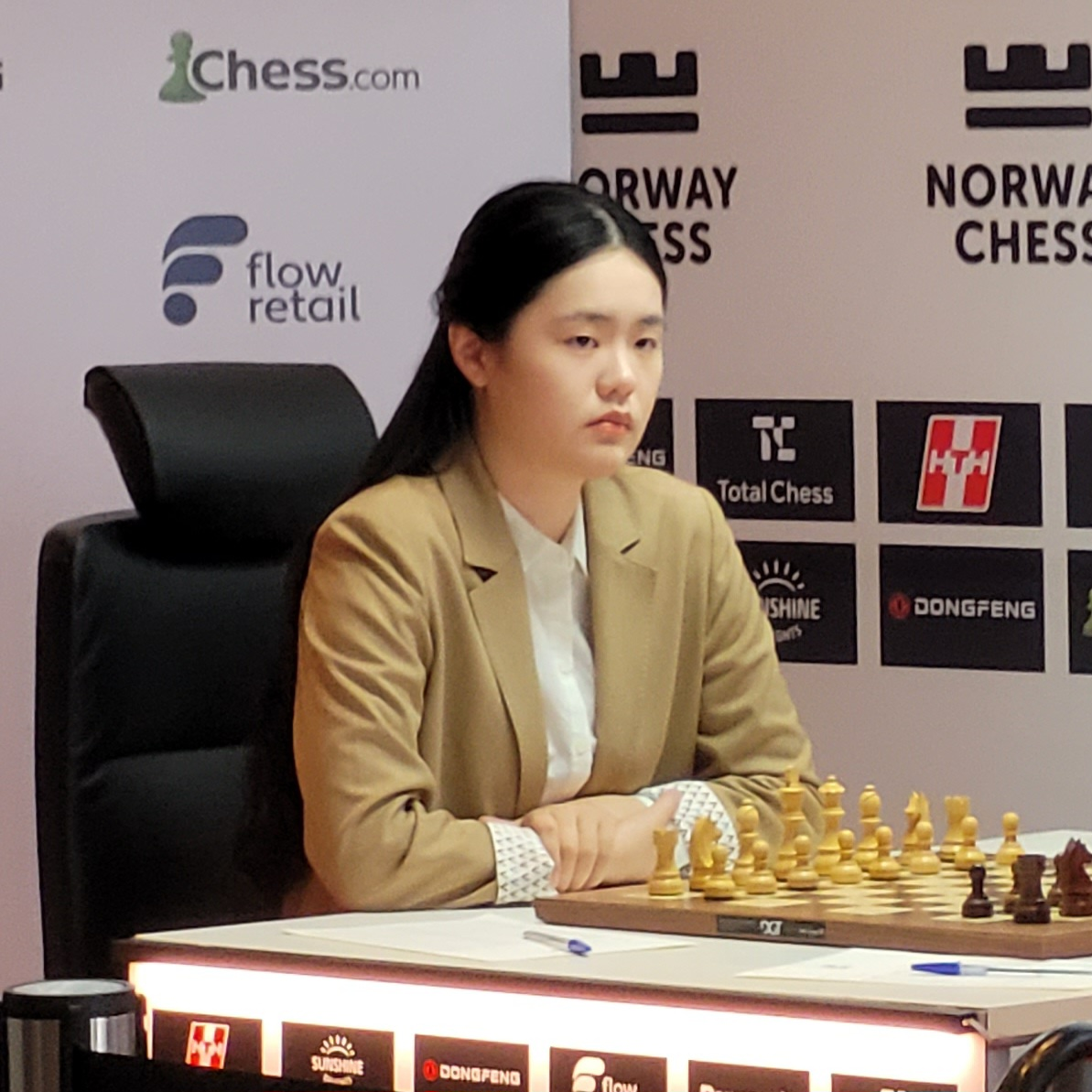
Zhu Jiner of China achieved the highest performance rating in the Women's event.

China won the gold medal in the Women's event with a total of 20 match points, which was their seventh title in the Chess Olympiads. They remained undefeated in the tournament, having scored nine wins and two draws. Despite missing its highest-rated players, the rejuvenated Chinese team demonstrated strong performance and defeated Georgia and Poland, while drawing top-seeds India and Kazakhstan, on the way to the title. Kazakhstan won the silver medal with 18 match points (seven wins and four draws) and was the second team that remained undefeated throughout the tournament. A group of five teams—India, the United States, Poland, Armenia and Mongolia—finished with 17 match points, but the Indian team had the best tie-breaker and completed the podium. Georgia, Vietnam, Slovenia and Turkey rounded up the top ten, each scoring 16 match points.

The highest performance rating of 2638 in the Women's event was achieved by China's Zhu Jiner, who played on the top board, and scored 7 out of a possible 9 points (five wins and four draws). Individual gold medals were also won by Alice Lee with 8½ out of 10 and a performance rating of 2572, Lu Miaoyi of China with 9½ out of 11 and a performance rating of 2576, Elnaz Kaliakhmet of Kazakhstan with 7½ out of 9 and a performance rating of 2486, and Savitha Shri Baskar of India with 9 out of 10 and a performance rating of 2569. American Carissa Yip had the second highest performance rating of 2601, which earned her the silver medal on board one, after scoring 8 out of 10 (seven wins, two draws and one loss).

Final standings
#	Country	Players	Average rating	MP	dSB^{†}
1st place, gold medalist(s)	China	Zhu Jiner, Song Yuxin, Lu Miaoyi, Yan Tianqi, Zhai Mo	2429	20	
2nd place, silver medalist(s)	Kazakhstan	Assaubayeva, Nurman, Kamalidenova, Kaliakhmet, Nurgaliyeva	2438	18	
3rd place, bronze medalist(s)	India	Koneru, Vaishali, Divya, Vantika, Savitha	2466	17	424.0
4	United States	Yip, Lee, Krush, Abrahamyan, Atwell	2415	17	418.0
5	Poland	Kiołbasa, Maltsevskaya, Kulon, Soćko, Śliwicka	2369	17	381.0
6	Armenia	Mkrtchian L., Mkrtchyan M., Danielian, Gaboyan, Mkrtchyan A.	2322	17	369.0
7	Mongolia	Mungunzul, Munkhzul, Bayasgalan, Munguntuul, Bayarmaa	2324	17	331.0
8	Georgia	Dzagnidze, Batsiashvili, Khotenashvili, Javakhishvili, Arabidze	2451	16	360.0
9	Vietnam	Thảo Nguyên, Kim Phụng, Thùy Dương, Phương Hạnh, Mai Hưng	2287	16	348.0
10	Slovenia	Unuk, Urh, Shpanko, Beber, Mihelič	2241	16	336.0

Notes

- Average ratings calculated by chess-results.com based on September 2026 FIDE ratings.
- ^† The Sonneborn–Berger score is a tie-breaking criterion used to rank teams with equal match points.

All board medals were given out according to performance ratings for players who played at least eight games at the tournament. The winners of the gold medal on each board are listed in turn:

Board	Gold	Silver	Bronze
Board 1	Zhu Jiner; China	Carissa Yip; United States	Koneru Humpy; India
Board 2	Alice Lee; United States	Mariam Mkrtchyan; Armenia	Song Yuxin; China
Board 3	Lu Miaoyi; China	Divya Deshmukh; India	Bella Khotenashvili; Georgia
Board 4	Elnaz Kaliakhmet; Kazakhstan	Ineymig Hernández Gil; Cuba	Vantika Agrawal; India
Reserve	Savitha Shri Baskar; India	Nguyễn Thị Mai Hưng; Vietnam	Vesna Mihelič; Slovenia

=== Gaprindashvili Trophy ===
The Nona Gaprindashvili Trophy, created by FIDE in 1997 and named after former Women's World Champion Nona Gaprindashvili, is given to the teams with the best combined performance in the Open and Women's tournaments (sum of their positions in both standings). India won the Trophy ahead of the United States in second place and China in third place.

#	Team	Sum of positions
1	India	5
2	United States	8
3	China	9

== FIDE Congress ==
The 97th FIDE Congress (Note: The FIDE Congress is an annual event that combines the sessions of FIDE's main bodies—namely, the General Assembly, the FIDE Council, the Zonal Council and the FIDE Commissions. In even years, it is preferred that the FIDE Congress takes place during the Chess Olympiad, and it is therefore organised by the organiser of the Chess Olympiad.) was held during the Olympiad, from 19 to 28 September, with its General Assembly on 26 and 27 September. The FIDE presidential election took place during the Congress on 26 September. Three sets of candidates were approved by the FIDE Electoral Commission, each consisting of a joint ticket for president and deputy president:

- Jan Henric Buettner (president) and Malcolm Pein (deputy president)
- Wadim Rosenstein (president) and Gordon Tang (deputy president)
- Timur Turlov (president) and Viswanathan Anand (deputy president)

Each ticket had to meet several requirements in order to be approved: it had to be submitted two months before the General Assembly; the candidates for president and deputy president could not be from the same member federation; and the ticket required endorsements from five member federations including one from each of the four FIDE continents, but no more than eight federations in total, and each federation was entitled to endorse only one ticket.

Of the 204 FIDE member federations, 202 were eligible to vote, while the Russian and Rwandan federations were suspended. A total of 192 valid votes were counted in the opening round, and Turlov led with 96 votes, being short of a single vote to win the election. Turlov and Anand won the run-off against Rosenstein and Tang with 110 to 85 votes after being endorsed by Buettner and Pein who were eliminated in the opening round. Pein later explained that endorsement had come as a result of an agreement with Turlov that included commitment to oppose the readmission of suspended teams, implement CAS decisions, and ensure that no nation occupies ore than a quarter of FIDE managerial positions.

Other notable decisions made at the Congress include the election of Qatar to host the 48th Chess Olympiad. The General Assembly noted that both the Qatar Chess Association and the Chess Federation of Georgia showed readiness to host the event, and instructed the FIDE Management Board to conduct negotiations first with the Qatari authorities and keep Georgia as a back-up. Luigi Maggi of Italy, Bouchra Kadiri of Morocco, Mahir Mammedov of Azerbaijan, Carol S. Williams Pesqueira of Aruba and Mykhailo Podolyak of Ukraine were elected as FIDE Vice Presidents. The General Assembly also approved the introduction of a FIDE rating system for Fischer Random Chess (Chess960) no later than 1 June 2027.

== FIDE Excellence Awards ==
The inaugural FIDE Excellence Awards, which recognised achievements across the chess world in the 2024–2026 cycle, were presented at a special ceremony during the Olympiad. In each of the 11 categories, the FIDE Excellence Awards Jury shortlisted ten nominees from an open nomination process before the final recipients were determined by the FIDE Excellence Awards Panel. The ceremony began with welcoming remarks by the representative of the Uzbek president for sports Odil Abdurakhmanov and FIDE interim president Vishwanathan Anand, followed by the presentation of the awards. Former FIDE president Dvorkovich paid tributes to the late grandmaster, educator, commentator and content creator Daniel Naroditsky before the announcement of the winner in the "Daniel Naroditsky Best Creator Award" category, which was named after him. The overall winners across award categories were:

- Best Breakthrough: Yağız Kaan Erdoğmuş
- Best Comeback: Levon Aronian
- Best Team: India
- Best Chess Player with a Disability: Łukasz Nowak
- Daniel Naroditsky Best Creator Award: ChessBase India
- Best Tournament (Open): Qatar Masters Open
- Best Tournament (Round Robin): Norway Chess
- Best Federation: Chess Federation of Uzbekistan
- Best Chess Initiative: Chess in Schools and Communities
- Best Chess Player (Female): Divya Deshmukh
- Best Chess Player (Male): Javokhir Sindarov

In addition, a special recognition was given to the Chess Bundesliga to honour one of the world's most established and prestigious national chess leagues, and the FIDE America Social Initiatives Program 2025 was singled out for delivering 14 completed initiatives across 11 countries through the Confederation of Chess for the Americas Diversity Commission. All awards were presented during the ceremony, except for the Best Chess Player in the female and male categories, which were given during the closing ceremony of the Olympiad.

== Other events and initiatives ==
The 3rd Chess Olympiad for People with Disabilities took place from 10 to 17 September in Samarkand, which marked the first time the event was held at the same time and venue with the Chess Olympiad. After a total of 7 rounds were played, Poland won the gold medal, Cuba took silver and the hosts Uzbekistan completed the podium with the bronze medal out of 41 participating teams.

FIDE announced that a total of 900 electronic chessboards from the Olympiad would be distributed to national federations after the event. The goal of the initiative is to use the boards from the Olympiad as practical tournament equipment around the world. Federations interested to receive chessboards from the event were invited to express interest by contacting FIDE.

The FIDE Summit on Chess in Education 2026 took place during the Olympiad on 24 September at the Silk Road by Minyoun Hotel. This summit themed "Every Lesson Counts" is planned as a centrepiece event of the 2026 Year of Chess in Education that brought together voices from the global chess-in-education movement to discuss long-established national programmes, emerging grasroots initiatives and new partnerships with higher educational institutions. In order to support inclusion and participation from around the world, the event featured real-time voice translation in 64 languages.

== Concerns and controversies ==
=== Russia's suspension and Belarus's return ===
In March 2022, following the recommendation by the International Olympic Committee (IOC) in response to the Russian invasion of Ukraine, the FIDE Council suspended the national teams of Russia and Belarus from participation in official FIDE tournaments until further notice, which resulted the national teams of both countries missing the 44th and 45th Chess Olympiads. In August 2024, the Kyrgyzstan Chess Federation submitted a resolution to the FIDE Congress to restore the full membership rights of the Chess Federation of Russia and the Belarusian Chess Federation with immediate effect, but, in September 2024, the General Assembly upheld the ban on Russian and Belarusian players and supported a move to consider easing the restrictions on disabled and junior players in consultation with the IOC.

In July 2025, the FIDE Council approved the participation of a Russian team in the upcoming World Women's Team Championship 2025 in Linares, Spain under the FIDE flag. The Ukrainian Chess Federation (UCF) condemned the decision, stating that it was a severe disregard of the fact that Russians had already killed more than 600 Ukrainian athletes and coaches, and called for its reversal. They also questioned FIDE's independence from Russia and directly targeted its president Dvorkovich who had previously served as Russia's deputy prime minister. The European Chess Union has also criticised the decision by issuing a statement in which they noted that the decision directly contradicts the decisions made during the FIDE General Assembly at the Budapest Chess Olympiad. In November 2025, shortly before the World Women's Team Championship, the UCF filed a last-minute complaint against the participation of "Team FIDE", consisting entirely of Russian players, and noted that FIDE cannot legally field a Russian team without receiving a formal non-objection letter from the IOC, which would violate both IOC guidelines and FIDE rules. Nonetheless, FIDE Legal Director Aleksandr Martynov provided a letter from IOC Sports Director Pierre Ducrey, signed on 28 July and addressed to president Dvorkovich, in which it was stated that IOC would not take a position on the matter.

In December 2025, the FIDE General Assembly passed two separate resolutions—one proposed by the RCF and another by the FIDE Council—allowing Russian and Belarusian teams to return to official FIDE competitions, lifting restrictions to organise events in Belarus and permitting the full use of national symbols in youth and junior competitions. However, the conduct of the vote, including the approval of two resolutions, was met with criticism and raised questions about the legality, governance and potential political influence within FIDE. The Nordic Chess Federation had issued a statement ahead of the General Assembly, urging delegates to vote against the proposal as it was not consistent with IOC's recommendations and principles. The English Chess Federation (ECF) issued a statement in which they condemned the conduct and the outcome of the FIDE Congress, mentioning that its president Dvorkovich acted on behalf of the Russian state, noting that the two adopted motions contradict IOC's policy and reaffirming that they would not host FIDE events with Russian teams until the IOC changes its policy. The UCF announced they are intent to submit an appeal to the Court of Arbitration for Sport (CAS). Former FIDE Events Coordinator Georgios Makropoulos, who was part of the FIDE's legal team in CAS proceedings, described the General Assembly as unprecedentedly flawed.

In March 2026, the CAS ruled that the RCF must stop organising events in occupied Ukrainian territories within 90 days or face suspension of up to three years. After failing to meet the deadline, FIDE suspended the RCF with immediate effect. The UCF welcomed the decision and hailed it as a historic victory, but some criticised it as creating a new loophole that can benefit Russian players. FIDE stated that Russian adult players would be allowed to participate under the FIDE flag and only juniors could play under the Russian flag, but there was a paragraph stating that Russians may still be eligible to play under a neutral flag in team events, which could pave the wave for Russian players to participate in the Samarkand Chess Olympiad. In July 2026, following the recommendations of the IOC Executive Board, the FIDE Council decided to lift all restrictions imposed on the Belarus Chess Federation with immediate effect, thus enabling Belarusian players and teams to participate under the national flag in the upcoming Chess Olympiad. In August 2026, the FIDE Council rejected a last-minute application by the RCF for entering teams in the Olympiad. RCF president Alexander Tkachev criticised the decision and mentioned that it was made on FIDE interim president Anand's initiative.

=== FIDE presidential election ===
In June 2026, FIDE president Dvorkovich confirmed that he would be running for third presidential term after the FIDE General Assembly had abolished the two-term restriction from the FIDE Charter in 2023. His decision came eight years after he had advocated to restrict the presidency to two limits, defying FIDE's announcement following his re-election in 2022 that his second term would be his last. Another change was that he added Timur Turlov, a Russian-born Kazakhstani billionaire and founder of Freedom Holding, as a running mate for deputy president to his candidacy. Dvorkovich explained that Anand would still remain a part of his team, and the former World Champion publicly supported his candidacy in a post on X.

In July 2026, Dvorkovich announced that he was stepping aside as FIDE president after his name was included on the newest European Union sanctions list. He faced a travel ban and asset freeze due to "publicly supporting the annexation of Crimea and calling occupied Ukrainian cities 'new territories' of the Russian Federation". He voluntarily suspended the exercise of his powers and duties as FIDE president with immediate effect and for as long as he is subject to sanctions by the European Union and Switzerland. The FIDE Council accepted and ratified his decision, adding that, in accordance with its Charter, the deputy president Anand shall act as an interim president. Jan Henric Buettner and Wadim Rosenstein, who had also submitted candidacies in the upcoming presidential election, expressed respect for the incumbent president. Following Dvorkovich's suspension of his presidency, his running mate Turlov submitted his candidacy for president with Anand as his deputy.

During the presidential campaign, the FIDE Electoral Commission received formal complaints from all three candidate tickets. Buettner sent a cease-and-desist letter to the FIDE Council in which he alleged that Turlov used FIDE personnel, resources, and financial assets to support his presidential campaign, and filed a complaint regarding the participation of the all-Russian university team at the recent FIDE World University Team Championship, a business involving subsidiaries of Turlov's Freedom Holding in connection with sanctions, and a conflict of interest involving Freedom Holding as FIDE's main sponsor. Rosenstein raised concerns about Turlov's Russian citizenship, sanctions imposed against him by Ukraine, and Russian court proceedings that resulted in an asset freeze. Turlov and Anand filed a counter-complaint against Rosenstein and Tang stating the pair had invalid nominations, started campaigning prematurely, made groundless accusations against Turlov and his colleagues, and other controversial public statements. Turlov also requested from the FIDE Electoral Commission to disqualify Rosenstein's nomination and strip the German Chess Federation's right to vote because of a sponsorship deal signed during the campaign.

=== Accommodation ===
Several national teams faced lodging difficulties upon arrival in Samarkand, and were forced to find accommodation at their own expense after waiting for hours.

India was one of the affected squads, and the members of the delegation were waiting for hours because their reservations at the Silk Road by Minyoun hotel were not properly communicated by the local organising committee. The captain of the team in the Open event Srinath Narayanan publicly raised the concern, while Vidit Gujrathi described the inconvenience as a "very poor first impression" of the event. AICF president Nitin Narang contacted FIDE and the local organisers in order to resolve the problem. FIDE issued a statement that they regret about the situation and announced that they would reimburse the national teams for rooms up to an appropriate standard for up to three days even though the accommodation is responsibility of the local organising committee. They added that they would also compensate the national teams staying in official hotels that do not meet the standards approved for the Olympiad. CFU first vice-president Alisher Saʼdullayev reported on the social media that the problem had been resolved, and rooms have been allocated to all members of the Indian national team.

Montenegro was another team that faced accommodation problems. On 13 September, an email from FIDE was addressed to the county's national federation, notifying that some members of their delegation had no room reservations at all and asked the federation to arrange accommodation independently for the missing persons from the confirmed list. This email also indicates that FIDE's staff were directly involved in managing reservations instead of the local organising committee. Ignatius Leong, a FIDE administration figure and co-author of the FIDE Events Commission Handbook, asked for responsibility. He argued that FIDE was overseeing room reservations and shares responsibility with the local organising committee. Leong claimed that several teams from Africa, the Americas and Asia were not given hospitality at a three-star standard. He also mentioned that the root problem goes back to the failure of proper inspection of Samarkand's facilities before the Olympiad was awarded to Uzbekistan and suggested that the FIDE delegates who approved the bid share some responsibility as well.

The Africa Chess Confederation (ACC) stated that some players waited for couple of hours to check into their hotel, and there were even cases in which multiple players were forced to share a single bed. They highlighted an incident involving the Madagascan delegation, who reportedly arrived early in the morning and were left without rooms for hours, leaving several players waiting in the hotel lobby until the following morning.

=== Visa problems ===
Two Namibian players—Goodwill Khoa and Otto Nakapunda—were denied Uzbek visas upon arrival in Tashkent, which questioned their participation in the tournament, so they had to register the coach of the women's team Leonhard Mueller and the national chess federation president Charles Eichab in the open team. The team's captain Priyadharshan Kannappan explained that he had no problems clearing immigration while travelling on his Indian passport from New Delhi to Samarkand via Tashkent. However, he applied for Uzbek e-visa several months in advance, while the members of the Namibian delegation decided to obtain visa on arrival at the Tashkent International Airport. Priyadharshan said that all players, except the two, got their visas, and they were not given a proper reason for the denial. It was later reported that Khoa's passport had been confiscated, he had been sent back to Istanbul, fined €800 and had to rebook his flight after paying €480.

FIDE interim president Vishwanathan Anand acknowledged that there were visa problems, and said that FIDE and the local organising committee were already working to resolve them. FIDE confirmed that some players and participants in the FIDE Congress have not obtained their visas. Among the affected persons were also multiple delegates with voting rights, as well as the member of the FIDE Council Benard Wanjala. The FIDE Council expressed confidence that the problems would be resolved, but noted that the Congress can take place only if all participants entitled to vote can exercise that right. As a result, they added that the Congress may be moved to other dates and location in case the rights of all of its members and delegates are not protected and guaranteed.

The ACC sent a letter of complaint to the CFU and the FIDE Election Commission concerning visa and accommodation problems for African delegations. They stated that several African delegates did not receive visas despite submitting their documents in advance even though other members of the same delegations obtained their visas and arrived without issues.

=== Observance of Yom Kippur ===
In the fifth round, the matches involving Israel started earlier by one hour and fifteen minutes because of the observance of Yom Kippur, the holiest day of the year in Judaism, after their opponents—Singapore in the Open and Colombia in the Women's events—agreed to reschedule. The Israeli teams had to complete their games before sunset (18:33 UZB, UTC+5) on 20 September, when the 25-hour fast and period of prayer and reflection began. However, Israel's request to reschedule their matches in the sixth round either after 19:30 UZB (UTC+5:00) on Monday (21 September) or on Tuesday (22 September) was refused by both Netherlands in the Open and Bulgaria in the Women's event. As a consequence, they had to forfeit their matches and their opponents were awarded 4–0 victories. The president of the Israel Chess Federation Zvika Barkai accused FIDE of failing to obey a prior agreement to make rescheduling arrangements for Yom Kippur. He explained that they approached FIDE six months earlier, when they noticed that the Olympiad's schedule would fall on the holiday, and requested them to change the date or provide a special agreement. Barkai added that it was agreed in writing that Israel's games overlapping with the holiday would be rescheduled accordingly. He also condemned the Dutch and Bulgarian teams for behaving in an unsporting manner.

=== Other incidents ===
In the first round of the Open event, Pakistan refused to field players and forfeited their match against Israel. The Chess Federation of Pakistan (CFP) explained that the decision followed the country's policy of not recognising Israel. In addition, the CFP president Syed Zeeshan Naqvi noted that the boycott's goal was also to express solidarity with the Palestinians.

== See also ==
- Chess Olympiad
- World Rapid Chess Championship 2023
- World Blitz Chess Championship 2023
- FIDE Grand Swiss Tournament 2025

== Notes ==
Preceded by 45th Chess Olympiad; Budapest, Hungary	Chess Olympiad; 46th Olympiad (2026); Samarkand, Uzbekistan	Succeeded by 47th Chess Olympiad; Abu Dhabi, United Arab Emirates
