= Concerns and controversies at the 46th Chess Olympiad =

There were several concerns and controversies related to the 46th Chess Olympiad, which took place in Samarkand, Uzbekistan, from 15 to 27 September 2026.

== Russia's suspension and Belarus' return ==
In March 2022, following the recommendation by the International Olympic Committee (IOC) in response to the Russian invasion of Ukraine, the FIDE Council suspended the national teams of Russia and Belarus from participation in official FIDE tournaments until further notice, which resulted the national teams of both countries to miss the 44th and the 45th Chess Olympiads. In August 2024, the Kyrgyzstan Chess Federation submitted a resolution to the FIDE Congress to restore the full membership rights of the Chess Federation of Russia (CFR) and the Belarusian Chess Federation with immediate effect, but in September 2024, the General Assembly upheld the ban on Russian and Belarusian players and supported a move to consider easing the restrictions on disabled and junior players in consultation with the IOC.

In July 2025, the FIDE Council approved the participation of a Russian team in the upcoming World Women's Team Championship 2025 in Linares, Spain under the FIDE flag. The Ukrainian Chess Federation (UCF) condemned the decision, stating that it was a severe disregard of the fact that Russians had already killed more than 600 Ukrainian athletes and coaches, and called for its reversal. They also questioned FIDE's independence from Russia and directly targeted its president, Arkady Dvorkovich, who had previously served as Russia's deputy prime minister. The European Chess Union has also criticised the decision by issuing a statement in which they noted that the decision directly contradicts the decisions made during the FIDE General Assembly at the Budapest Chess Olympiad. In November 2025, shortly before the World Women's Team Championship, the UCF filed a last-minute complaint against the participation of "Team FIDE", consisting entirely of Russian players, and noted that FIDE cannot legally field a Russian team without receiving a formal non-objection letter from the IOC, which would violate both IOC guidelines and FIDE rules. Nonetheless, FIDE Legal Director Aleksandr Martynov provided a letter from IOC Sports Director Pierre Ducrey, signed on 28 July and addressed to president Dvorkovich, in which it was stated that IOC would not take a position on the matter.

In December 2025, the FIDE General Assembly passed two separate resolutions—one proposed by the CFR and another by the FIDE Council—allowing Russian and Belarusian teams to return to official FIDE competitions, lifting restrictions to organise events in Belarus and permitting the full use of national symbols in youth and junior competitions. However, the conduct of the vote, including the approval of two resolutions, was met with criticism and raised questions about the legality, governance and potential political influence within FIDE. The Nordic Chess Federation had issued a statement ahead of the General Assembly, urging delegates to vote against the proposal as it was not consistent with IOC's recommendations and principles. The English Chess Federation issued a statement in which they condemned the conduct and the outcome of the FIDE Congress, mentioning that its president Dvorkovich acted on behalf of the Russian state, noting that the two adopted motions contradict IOC's policy and reaffirming that they would not host FIDE events with Russian teams until the IOC changes its policy. The UCF announced they are intent to submit an appeal to the Court of Arbitration for Sport (CAS). Former FIDE Events Coordinator Georgios Mastrokoukos, who was part of the FIDE's legal team in CAS proceedings, described the General Assembly as unprecedentedly flawed.

In March 2026, the CAS ruled that the CFR must stop organising events in occupied Ukrainian territories within 90 days or face suspension of up to three years. After failing to meet the deadline, FIDE suspended the CFR with immediate effect. The UCF welcomed the decision and hailed it as a historic victory, but some criticised it as creating a new loophole that can benefit Russian players. FIDE stated that Russian adult players would be allowed to participate under the FIDE flag and only juniors could play under the Russian flag, but there was a paragraph stating that Russians may still be eligible to play under a neutral flag in team events, which could pave the wave for Russian players to participate in the Samarkand Chess Olympiad. In July 2026, following the recommendations of the IOC Executive Board, the FIDE Council decided to lift all restrictions imposed on the Belarus Chess Federation with immediate effect, thus enabling Belarusian players and teams to participate under the national flag in the upcoming Chess Olympiad. In August 2026, the FIDE Council rejected a last-minute application by the CFR for entering teams in the Olympiad. CFR president Alexander Tkachev criticised the decision and mentioned that it was made on FIDE interim president Viswanathan Anand's initiative.

== FIDE presidential election ==
=== Dvorkovich's withdrawal ===
In June 2026, FIDE president Dvorkovich confirmed that he would be running for third presidential term after the FIDE General Assembly had abolished the two-term restriction from the FIDE Charter in 2023. His decision came eight years after he had advocated to restrict the presidency to two limits, defying FIDE's announcement following his re-election in 2022 that his second term would be his last. Another change was that he added Timur Turlov, Russian-born Kazakhstani billionaire and founder of Freedom Holding, as a running mate for deputy president to his candidacy. Dvorkovich explained that Anand, his incumbent deputy president, would remain a part of his team; Anand publicly supported his candidacy in a post on X (formerly Twitter).

In July 2026, Dvorkovich announced that he was stepping aside as FIDE president after his name was included on the newest European Union sanction list. He faced a travel ban and asset freeze due to his public support of the Russian annexation of Crimea and calling occupied Ukrainian cities as new territories of Russia. He voluntarily suspended the exercise of his powers and duties as FIDE president with immediate effect and for as long as he is subject to sanctions by European Union and Swiss laws and regulations. The FIDE Council accepted and ratified his decision, adding that, in accordance with its Charter, deputy president Anand shall act as the interim president. Jan Henric Buettner and Wadim Rosenstein, who had also submitted candidacies in the upcoming presidential election, expressed their personal respect to the incumbent president.

Following Dvorkovich's suspension of his presidency, his running mate Turlov submitted a candidacy for president and included Anand as a candidate for deputy president in his ticket.

=== Complaints in the presidential campaign ===
During the presidential campaign, the FIDE Electoral Commission received formal complaints from all three candidate tickets.

Buettner sent a cease-and-desist letter to the FIDE Council claiming that Turlov used FIDE personnel, resources, and financial assets to support his presidential campaign, and filed a complaint regarding the participation of the all-Russian university team at the recent FIDE World University Team Championship, a business involving subsidiaries of Turlov's Freedom Holding in relation with sanctions, and a conflict of interest involving Freedom Holding as FIDE's main sponsor. In support of his claim on the use of FIDE resources, he pointed out to events in Cape Town, Bucharest and Addis Ababa, and added that similar arrangements were expected in Costa Rica, Aruba, Panama and New York City.

Rosenstein raised concerns about Turlov's Russian citizenship, sanctions imposed against him by Ukraine, and Russian court proceedings that resulted in an asset freeze. Turlov's team rejected the claims, stating that he had renounced his Russian citizenship and had become a Kazakh citizen, arguing that the sanctions apply within Ukraine and do not violate FIDE or national chess federation rules, and explaining that the information on the court proceedings and that the asset freeze measure had been lifted following a settlement in 2025. A report by Russian newspaper Kommersant confirmed that the Nizhny Novgorod Arbitration Court approved a settlement and lifted the restrictions on Turlov's assets in September 2025. Turlov and Anand filed a counter-complaint against Rosenstein and his running mate Gordon Tang stating the pair had invalid nominations, started campaigning prematurely, made groundless accusations against Turlov and his colleagues, and other controversial public statements.

Turlov also requested from the FIDE Electoral Commission to disqualify Rosenstein's nomination and strip the German Chess Federation's right to vote because of a sponsorship deal signed during the campaign. The complaint claimed that the German Chess Federation appointed Rosenstein as its FIDE delegate in May 2026, nominated him for FIDE president in July 2026, and announced that Rosenstein and his company WR Events had become its sponsor in August 2026.

== Before the Olympiad ==
=== Accommodation ===
Several national teams faced lodging difficulties upon arrival in Samarkand, and were forced to find accommodation at their own expense after waiting for hours.

India was one of the affected squads, and the members of the delegation were waiting for hours because their reservations at the Silk Road by Minyoun hotel were not properly communicated by the local organising committee. The captain of the team in the Open event, Srinath Narayanan, publicly raised the concern, while player Vidit Gujrathi described the inconvenience as a "very poor first impression" of the event. AICF president Nitin Narang contacted FIDE and the local organisers in order to resolve the problem. FIDE issued a statement that they regret the situation and announced that they would reimburse the national teams for rooms up to an appropriate standard for up to three days even though the accommodation is responsibility of the local organising committee. They added that they would also compensate the national teams staying in official hotels that do not meet the standards approved for the Olympiad. Uzbekistan Chess Federation first vice-president Alisher Saʼdullayev reported on the social media that the problem had been resolved, and rooms have been allocated to all members of the Indian national team.

Montenegro was another team that faced accommodation problems. On 13 September, an email from FIDE was addressed to the county's national federation, notifying that some members of their delegation had no room reservations at all and asked the federation to arrange accommodation independently for the missing persons from the confirmed list. This email also indicates that FIDE's staff were directly involved in managing reservations instead of the local organising committee. Ignatius Leong, a FIDE administration figure and co-author of the FIDE Events Commission Handbook, asked for responsibility. He argued that FIDE was overseeing room reservations and shares responsibility with the local organising committee. Leong claimed that several teams from Africa, the Americas and Asia were not given hospitality at a three-star standard. He also mentioned that the root problem goes back to the failure of proper inspection of Samarkand's facilities before the Olympiad was awarded to Uzbekistan and suggested that the FIDE delegates who approved the bid share some responsibility as well.

The Africa Chess Confederation (ACC) stated that some players waited for couple of hours to check into their hotel, and there were even cases in which multiple players were forced to share a single bed. They highlighted an incident involving the Madagascan delegation, who reportedly arrived early in the morning and were left without rooms for hours, leaving several players waiting in the hotel lobby until the following morning.

=== Visa problems ===
Two Namibian players—Goodwill Khoa and Otto Nakapunda—were denied Uzbek visas upon arrival in Tashkent, which questioned their participation in the tournament, so they had to register the coach of the women's team Leonhard Mueller and the national chess federation president Charles Eichab in the men’s team. The team's captain Priyadharshan Kannappan explained that he had no problems clearing immigration while travelling on his Indian passport from New Delhi to Samarkand via Tashkent. However, he applied for Uzbek e-visa several months in advance, while the members of the Namibian delegation decided to obtain visa on arrival at the Tashkent International Airport. Priyadharshan said that all other players had got their visas and that they had not been given a proper reason for the denial. It was later reported that Khoa's passport had been confiscated, he had been sent back to Istanbul, fined €800 and had to rebook his flight after paying €480.

FIDE interim president Viswanathan Anand acknowledged that there were visa problems, and said that FIDE and the local organising committee were already working to resolve them. FIDE confirmed that some players and participants in the FIDE Congress have not obtained their visas. Among the affected persons were also multiple delegates with voting rights, as well as the member of the FIDE Council Benard Wanjala. The FIDE Council expressed confidence that the problems would be resolved, but noted that the Congress can take place only if all participants entitled to vote can exercise that right. As a result, they added that the Congress may be moved to other dates and location in case the rights of all of its members and delegates are not protected and guaranteed.

The ACC sent a letter of complaint to the Uzbekistan Chess Federation and the FIDE Election Commission concerning visa and accommodation problems for African delegations. They stated that several African delegates did not receive visas despite submitting their documents in advance even though other members of the same delegations obtained their visas and arrived without issues.

== During the Olympiad ==
=== Boycott of Israel ===
In the first round of the Open event, Pakistan refused to field players and forfeited their match against Israel. The Chess Federation of Pakistan (CFP) explained that the decision followed the country's policy of not recognising Israel. In addition, the CFP president Syed Zeeshan Naqvi noted that the boycott's goal was also to express solidarity with the Palestinians.

=== Observance of Yom Kippur ===
In the fifth round, the matches involving Israel started earlier by one hour and fifteen minutes because of the observance of Yom Kippur, the holiest day of the year in Judaism, after their opponents—Singapore in the Open and Colombia in the Women's events—agreed to reschedule. The Israeli teams had to complete their games before sunset on 20 September when the 25-hour fast and period of prayer and reflection began. However, Israel's request to reschedule their matches in the sixth round either after 19:30 UZB (UTC+5:00) on Monday (21 September) or on Tuesday (22 September) was refused by both Netherlands in the Open and Bulgaria in the Women's event. As a consequence, they forfeited the matches and their opponents were awarded 4-0 victories. The president of the Israel Chess Federation Zvika Barkai accused FIDE that they did not abide by a prior agreement to reschedule the matches during Yom Kippur. He explained that they approached FIDE six months earlier when they noticed that the Olympiad's schedule would fall on the holiday, and requested them to change the date or provide a special agreement. Barkai added that it was agreed in writing that Israel's games overlapping with the holiday would be rescheduled accordingly. He also accused the Dutch and Bulgarian teams of behaving in an unsporting manner.
