= Nazar Firman =

Ukrainian chess grandmaster (born 1983)

Personal information
- Born: March 22, 1983 (age 43) Lviv, Ukrainian SSR, Soviet Union

Chess career
- Country: Ukraine
- Title: Grandmaster (2011)
- FIDE rating: 2452 (October 2026)
- Peak rating: 2571 (July 2009)

Nazar Bogdanovych Firman is a Ukrainian chess grandmaster.

== Chess career ==
In 2006, he tied for 4th–6th with Mikhailo Oleksienko and Valeriy Aveskulov in the Vasylyshyn Memorial in Lviv.

He was awarded the Grandmaster title in 2011, after achieving his norms at the:

- XXII Cappelle-la-Grande Open in February 2006
- Bundesliga team tournament in April 2008
- Podillya round robin tournament in October 2008

He is a coach at the Lviv Chess Academy; his students include the silver medalist in the 2024 U10 World Cadet Rapid Championship and 2024 U18 Ukrainian Girls champion Tetyana Skarbarchuk.
