= Chess Federation of Georgia =

Governing body of chess in Georgia

- Formation: 1936
- Headquarters: Tbilisi Chess Palace, Tbilisi
- Region served: Georgia (country)
- Affiliations: FIDE, European Chess Union
- Website: www.geochess.ge

The Chess Federation of Georgia (until 1992 — Chess Section of Georgia) is the main governing body of chess in Georgia (country) and is affiliated with FIDE. It oversees the development, promotion, and organization of chess competitions in the country, and forms national teams for men and women.

== History ==
The federation was established on December 19, 1936, when a chess club opened at Rustaveli Avenue No.48 in Tbilisi. This club served as the center of Georgian chess until 1973. The first chairman was Victor Goglidze, the first Georgian chess master. Under his guidance, a 1948 decree was adopted to promote chess in Georgia.

The development of Georgian chess was further supported by the construction of the Tbilisi Chess Palace in Vera Park. Project work began under Giorgi Jabua and was completed during Archil Chirakadze's leadership.

Throughout its history, the federation was headed by influential public figures (ministers, diplomats, editors), which facilitated organizing world championship matches (with Nona Gaprindashvili), hosting international tournaments, publishing chess bulletins, and promoting chess through the media.

After Georgia regained independence in the 1990s, the federation strengthened its international presence. During Vazha Shubladze’s leadership, Georgia achieved notable results in Chess Olympiad and European Team Chess Championship. The Nona Gaprindashvili International Cup was established to award the country with the best combined result of men’s and women’s teams at the Olympiad.

== Activities ==
The Chess Federation of Georgia coordinates chess development nationwide, including:

- National championships — Annual Georgian Chess Championship events for men, women, age categories (8–18), and veterans.
- International relations — Member of FIDE and European Chess Union, cooperating with international bodies to host tournaments.
- National team preparation — Formation of national men’s and women’s teams, organizing training camps, and participation in Chess Olympiad and world and European team events.
- Educational projects — Implementing the Chess in Schools program to integrate chess as an educational tool.

=== Major events ===
Georgia has hosted numerous international competitions:

- 43rd Chess Olympiad in Batumi (2018)
- Chess World Cup (2017)
- European individual championships for men and women
- World and European youth championships

=== Regional development ===
The federation coordinates regional chess organizations and clubs in cities such as Tbilisi, Batumi, Kutaisi, Poti, Gori, Rustavi, and Zugdidi, focusing on identifying and supporting talented young players.

== Presidents ==
Name	Years	Status / Key activity
Victor Goglidze	1936–1954	First Georgian chess master; professional player
Mikheil Kakabadze	1954–1956	Journalist; editor of Lelo
Giorgi Jabua	1956–1960	Professor; Deputy Chairman of the Council of Ministers
Archil Chirakadze	1960–1972	Minister of Finance; supervised Chess Palace construction
Alexander Chikvaidze	1972–1978	Historian; diplomat; Minister of Foreign Affairs
Giorgi Bedineishvili	1978–1988	Editor of Kommunisti
Petre Chkheidze	1988–1991	Lawyer; Georgian representative to United Nations
Guram Absandze	1991–1992	Minister of Finance
Alexander Chikvaidze	1992–1994	Second term
Vazha Shubladze	1994–1998	Sports official; Olympic successes
Zurab Azmaiparashvili	1998–2000	Grandmaster; federation president
Nona Gaprindashvili	2000–	Five-time world champion; first female president
Nino Gurieli	2002–2004	International women's grandmaster
Kakha Chigogidze	2004–	Chess player
Guram Absandze	2004–2006	Re-elected for a second term
Roman Sichinava	2006–	Georgian chess player; international master
Giorgi Giorgadze	2008–2022	International grandmaster
Akaki Iashvili	2022–present	Former FIDE vice-president

== Bibliography ==
- Giorgadze, T. Chronicle of Georgian Chess, Part III. Tbilisi, 2000, pp. 11–13.
