= Valeriy Aveskulov =

Ukrainian chess grandmaster (born 1986)

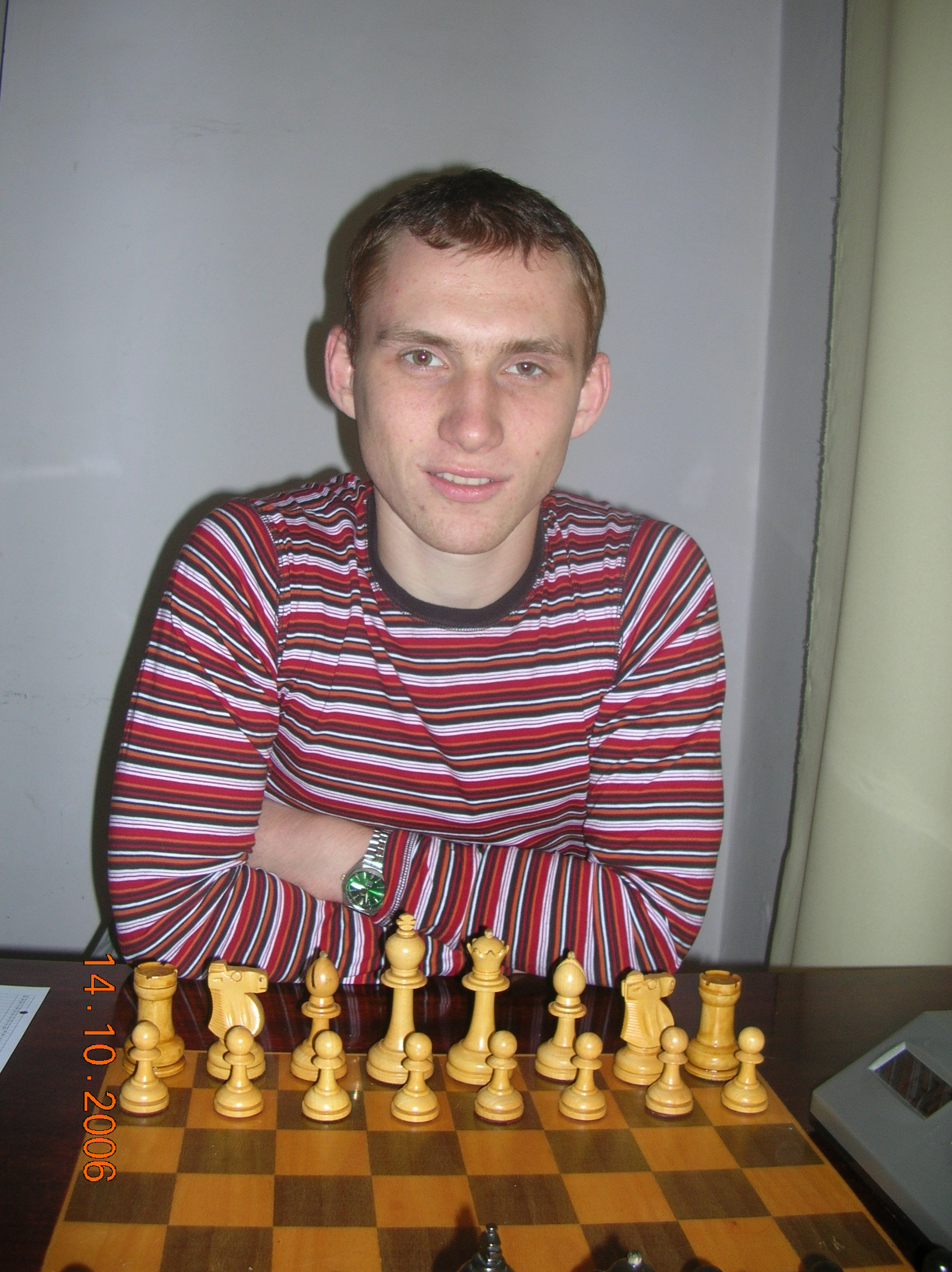

Personal information
- Born: Валерій Авескулов; January 31, 1986 (age 40) Krasnyi Luch, Ukraine

Chess career
- Country: Ukraine
- Title: Grandmaster (2006)
- FIDE rating: 2447 (October 2026)
- Peak rating: 2545 (October 2007)

Valeriy Dmytrovych Aveskulov (Ukrainian: Валерій Дмитрович Авескулов; born January 31, 1986, in Krasnyi Luch, Ukraine) is a Ukrainian chess Grandmaster (2006) and Ukrainian Champion in 2007.

In 2006, he won the Femida Tournament in Kharkiv and tied for 4th–6th with Mikhailo Oleksienko and Nazar Firman in the Vasylyshyn Memorial in Lviv. In 2007, he came first in the OCF North American FIDE Open in Stillwater, Oklahoma.

His handle on the Internet Chess Club is "Prokuror".
