= Nona Gaprindashvili Trophy =

Award for best combined performance in the Open and Women's Chess Olympiads

- Awarded for: Best performance by a national chess team in both the open and women's events at the Chess Olympiad
- Presented by: FIDE

History
- First winner: Russia (1st title, 1998)
- Most wins: Russia (6 times)
- Most recent: India (3rd title, 2026)

The Nona Gaprindashvili Trophy is an award given to the national chess team that achieves the best combined score in the open and women's events of the Chess Olympiad. It is named in honour of former women's world champion (1962–1978) Nona Gaprindashvili. The most recent winner is India, in 2026.

== Trophy history ==
The trophy was established in 1997. It is awarded to the team that has the best overall performance across the open and women's divisions. It was first awarded to Russian men's and women's teams at the 33rd Chess Olympiad in Elista in 1998.

In 2008, after the trophy was won by Ukraine, it was damaged during transportation to Ukraine. The trophy was restored by Lobortas Classic Jewelry House in 2009. In 2022, the trophy was won by India. It was won again by India in 2024, but only a copy of the award was presented, as the original had disappeared in India in between the Olympiads.

Only four teams have won this cup. Russia has won the award a record six times, while China and India have each won it three times, and Ukraine has each won it twice.

== Trophy winners ==
Year	First	Second	Third
1998	Russia	China	Georgia
2000	Russia (2^{nd})	Ukraine	Georgia
2002	Russia (3^{rd})	China	Hungary
2004	Russia (4^{th})	United States	Armenia
2006	China	Ukraine	Armenia
2008	Ukraine	Armenia	United States
2010	Russia (5^{th})	China	Ukraine
2012	Russia (6^{th})	China	Ukraine
2014	China (2^{nd})	Russia	Ukraine
2016	Ukraine (2^{nd})	United States	China
2018	China (3^{rd})	Russia	Ukraine
2022	India	United States	India 2
2024	India (2^{nd})	United States	Armenia
2026	India (3^{rd})	United States	China
