= Zarina Nurgaliyeva =

Kazakhstani chess player (born 2009)

Personal information
- Born: October 9, 2009 (age 17) Atyrau, Kazakhstan

Chess career
- Country: Kazakhstan
- Title: Woman International Master (2025)
- Peak rating: 2344 (August 2025)

Zarina Nurgaliyeva is a Kazakhstani chess player.

== Chess career ==
In July 2018, she won the U11 section of the Asian Schools Chess Championship.

In August 2025, she played for Kazakhstan's second team in the World Youth Chess Olympiad, where the team won the bronze medal.

In May 2026, she won the Kazakhstani Women's Chess Championship, earning the right to play for the national team in the 2026 Olympiad.

In September 2026, she played for Kazakhstan in her Olympiad debut in the 46th Chess Olympiad, where the team won the silver medal.
