= Anahit Mkrtchyan =

Armenian chess player (born 2009)

Personal information
- Born: 2009 (age 16–17)

Chess career
- Country: Armenia
- Peak rating: 2107 (February 2026)

Anahit H. Mkrtchyan is an Armenian chess player.

== Chess career ==
In January 2026, she won the Armenian Women's Chess Championship with a score of 6.5/9, earning the right to play for the national team in the 2026 Olympiad.

In September 2026, she played for Armenia in the 46th Chess Olympiad and scored 2/3, where the team finished in 6th place.
