= Nadiia Shpanko =

Ukrainian-Slovenian chess player (born 2002)

Personal information
- Born: May 2, 2002 (age 24) Vinnytsia, Ukraine

Chess career
- Country: Ukraine (until 2022); Slovenia (since 2022)
- Title: Woman International Master (2020)
- Peak rating: 2262 (November 2018)

Nadiia Serhiivna Shpanko is a Ukrainian-Slovenian chess player.

== Chess career ==
In April 2021, she finished as the top female player in group D of the European Online Amateur Chess Championship with a score of 6.5/9.

In September 2026, she played for Slovenia in the 46th Chess Olympiad, where she scored 4/7 and the team finished in 10th place overall.
