= Elnaz Kaliakhmet =

Kazakhstani chess player (born 2010)

Personal information
- Born: 2010 (age 15–16)

Chess career
- Country: Kazakhstan
- Title: Woman International Master (2025)
- Peak rating: 2383 (October 2026)

Elnaz Qaliahmet (Note: Often transliterated as Elnaz Kaliakhmet through a Russified Romanization of Ельназ Калиахмет.) (Kazakh: Елназ Қалиахмет; born 2010) is a Kazakh chess player who holds the title of Woman International Master, which she earned in 2025.

== Chess career ==
In November 2023, Kaliakhmet earned silver in the U14 Girls section of the World Junior Chess Championship, and in April 2025, became the U16 Girls World Youth Rapid Chess Champion, finishing two points clear of the silver medalist.

In June 2025, aged 14, Kaliakhmet became the youngest Kazakhstani Women's Chess Championship winner.

She qualified for the Women's Chess World Cup 2025, defeating Khanim Balajayeva in the first round and Grandmaster Nino Batsiashvili in the second round, before losing to Umida Omonova in the third round.

She played for Kazakhstan at the 46th Chess Olympiad, where she earned the individual gold medal on board 4.
