= Tetyana Skarbarchuk =

Ukrainian chess player (born 2007)

Personal information
- Born: November 3, 2007 (age 19) Lviv, Ukraine

Chess career
- Country: Ukraine
- Peak rating: 2240 (July 2026)

Tetyana Vasylivna Skarbarchuk is a Ukrainian chess player.

== Chess career ==
Skarbarchuk is a graduate of the Lviv Chess Academy and is coached by grandmaster Nazar Firman. In June 2024, she won the U18 Girls Ukrainian Championship.

In December 2025, she won the Ukrainian Women's Chess Championship with a score of 8.5/9, earning the right to play in the 2026 Olympiad.

In August 2026, she finished in second place at the European Junior Girls' Chess Championship with a score of 7/9.

In September 2026, she played for Ukraine in the 46th Chess Olympiad, where she scored 5.5/9.
