= Bayarjargal Bayarmaa =

Mongolian chess player (born 1995)

Personal information
- Born: July 6, 1995 (age 31) Ulaanbaatar, Mongolia

Chess career
- Country: Mongolia
- Title: Woman International Master (2018)
- Peak rating: 2265 (May 2015)

Bayarjargal Bayarmaa is a Mongolian chess player.

== Chess career ==
In May 2022, she finished in second place in the Mongolian Women's Chess Championship.

In September 2026, she played for Mongolia in the 46th Chess Olympiad, where the team finished in 7th place. She scored 4.5/5, with her best result being a win against Maria Tsakona.
