= Bạch Ngọc Thùy Dương =

Vietnamese chess player (born 2003)

Personal information
- Born: July 5, 2003 (age 23) Long An, Vietnam

Chess career
- Country: Vietnam
- Title: Woman International Master (2020)
- Peak rating: 2271 (November 2020)

Bạch Ngọc Thùy Dương is a Vietnamese chess player.

== Chess career ==
In April 2025, she won the Vietnamese Chess Championship.

In September 2026, she played for Vietnam in the 46th Chess Olympiad, where the team finished in 9th place. She scored 5/9, notably getting a win against Gabriela Antova.
