= Rose Atwell =

American chess player (born 2009)

Personal information
- Born: January 28, 2009 (age 17) Valencia, California

Chess career
- Country: United States
- Title: International Master (2026)
- Peak rating: 2410 (June 2026)

Rose Atwell (born January 28, 2009) is an American chess player who holds the title of International Master (IM). She reached a peak FIDE rating of 2410 in June 2026.

== Chess career ==
In April 2023, Atwell defeated a grandmaster for the first time, at the Larry Evans Memorial.

In July 2024, Atwell finished second in the U.S. Girls' Junior Championship, behind Alice Lee. In October, making her debut in the U.S. Women's Chess Championship, she defeated former U.S. women's champion Anna Zatonskih in the first round.

In September 2025, Atwell won the International Master section of the Charlotte Chess Center Labor Day Norm Invitational with a score of 6½/9. The result earned her a second IM norm and more than 50 FIDE rating points. In the October 2025 FIDE rating list, she was ranked 85th among women and 12th among girls after gaining 69 rating points during the preceding month.

At the 2026 Saint Louis Masters, Atwell scored 4/9 for a 2494 performance rating, earned another IM norm, and gained 36 FIDE rating points. Her results included a win over grandmaster Harsha Bharathakoti and draws against four other grandmasters.

Later that month, Atwell tied for first with Eric Chang Liu in the 2026 National High School (K–12) Championship, scoring 6½/7 and finishing ahead on tiebreaks. By that point, she had crossed a FIDE rating of 2400 and had earned all three required IM norms, making her eligible for the International Master title. FIDE subsequently listed Atwell as an International Master in 2026.

In June 2026, Atwell's published rating reached a career-high 2410 after she finished second in the Southern California State Championship. FIDE reported that she had gained 120 rating points during the first five months of the year. That month, she was also selected as a 2026 Samford Chess Fellow.

Atwell was selected for the United States women's team for the 2026 Chess Olympiad in Samarkand, where she was scheduled to make her Olympiad debut.
