= Khishigbaatar Bayasgalan =

Mongolian chess player (born 2007)

Personal information
- Born: 2007 (age 18–19) Ulaanbaatar, Mongolia

Chess career
- Country: Mongolia
- Title: Woman Candidate Master (2017)
- Peak rating: 2320 (October 2026)

Khishigbaatar Bayasgalan is a Mongolian chess player.

== Chess career ==
In May 2023, she tied for first place with Erdenebayar Khuslen and Batsaikhan Enkhsaran in the Mongolian Women's Chess Championship, but was ranked in second place after tiebreak scores.

In September 2026, she played for Mongolia on board 3 in the 46th Chess Olympiad, where the team finished in 7th place. She scored 8/11 and notably scored wins against Sophie Milliet and Meruert Kamalidenova.
