= Anja Beber =

Slovenian chess player (born 2011)

Personal information
- Born: 2011 (age 14–15) Ptuj, Slovenia

Chess career
- Country: Slovenia
- Title: Woman FIDE Master (2026)
- Peak rating: 2272 (September 2026)

Anja Beber is a Slovenian chess player.

== Chess career ==
In August 2026, she finished in third place at the European Junior Girls' Chess Championship with a score of 6.5/9.

In September 2026, she played for Slovenia in the 46th Chess Olympiad, where she notably held draws against Gunay Mammadzada and Sophie Milliet. The team finished in 10th place overall.
