= Lương Phương Hạnh =

Vietnamese chess player (born 1983)

Personal information
- Born: February 8, 1983 (age 43) Cần Thơ, Vietnam

Chess career
- Country: Vietnam
- Title: Woman Grandmaster (2025)
- Peak rating: 2313 (July 2019)

Lương Phương Hạnh is a Vietnamese chess player.

== Chess career ==
In October 2020, she won the Vietnamese Chess Championship.

In November 2025, she qualified for the Woman Grandmaster title after scoring 6/9 at the Capechecs Chess Tournament, becoming the seventh Vietnamese player to earn the title.

In September 2026, she played for Vietnam in the 46th Chess Olympiad, where the team finished in 9th place. She scored 5.5/9, notably getting a draw against Alicja Śliwicka.
