= Vesna Mihelič =

Slovenian chess player (born 2006)

Personal information
- Born: 2006 (age 19–20)

Chess career
- Country: Slovenia
- Title: Woman FIDE Master (2023)
- Peak rating: 2169 (October 2026)

Vesna Mihelič is a Slovenian chess player.

== Chess career ==
In July 2022, she tied for second place with Weronika Zabrzanska in the U16 Girls section of the European Rapid Chess Championship, clinching the silver medal on tiebreak scores.

In August 2026, she was in second place at the halfway point of the U20 Girls section of the European Junior Chess Championship. She finished the tournament in 10th place with a score of 5.5/9.

In September 2026, she played for Slovenia in the 46th Chess Olympiad, where she won the bronze medal on the reserve board with a score of 7/9 and the team finished in 10th place overall.
