= Mariam Mkrtchyan =

Armenian chess player (born 2004)

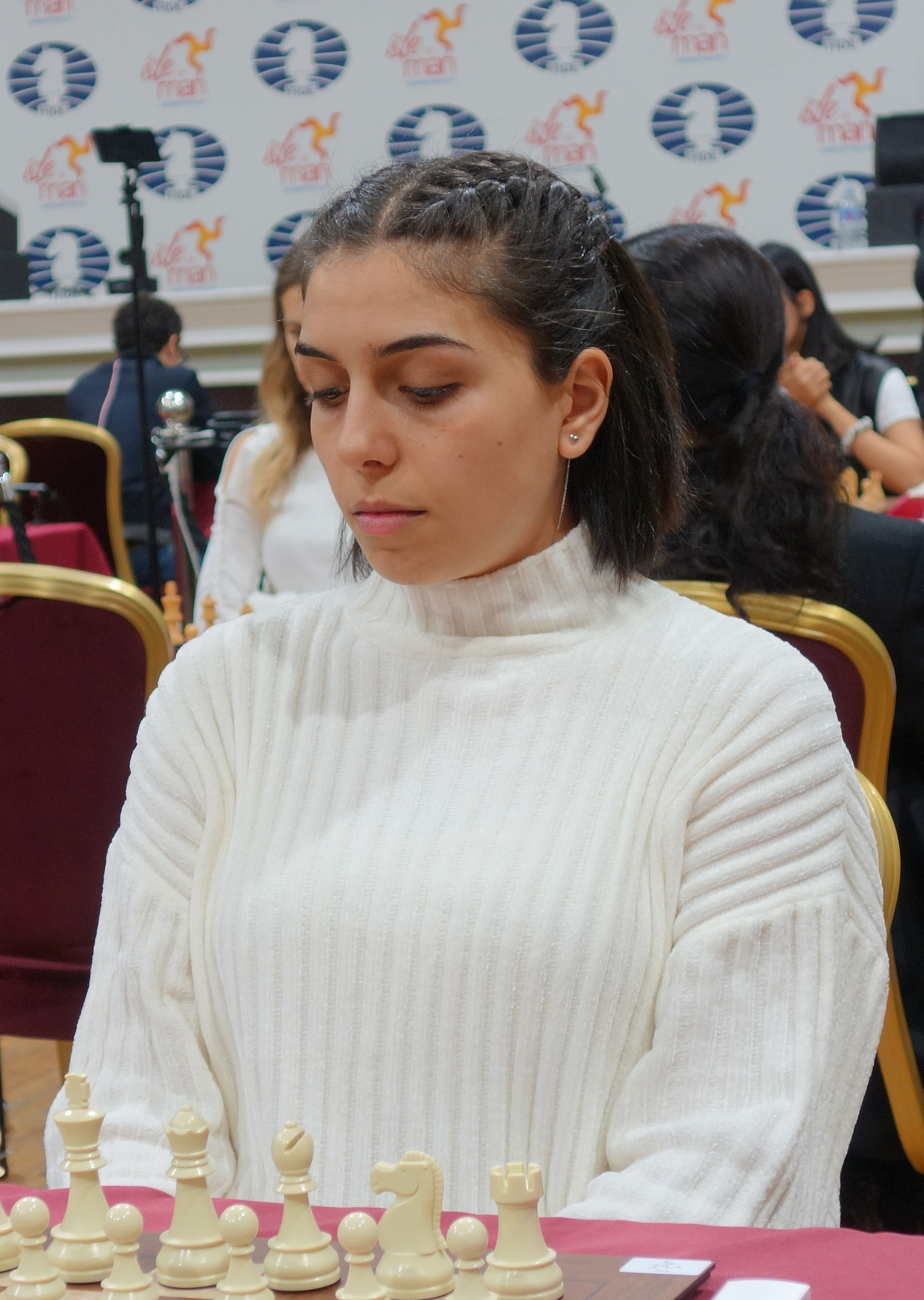

Personal information
- Born: February 27, 2004 (age 22) Yerevan, Armenia

Chess career
- Country: Armenia
- Title: Woman Grandmaster (2025)
- Peak rating: 2421 (October 2026)

Mariam Mkrtchyan (Armenian: Մարիամ Մկրտչյան) is an Armenian chess player who holds the title of Woman Grandmaster.

== Chess career ==
Over the span of 2 years from 2020 to 2022, Mkrtchyan improved her rating significantly from 2075 to 2343; an increase of nearly 300 points. In 2022, she won the Armenian women's championship and qualified for the national team. She then achieved a perfect score in the World Youth Championship for girls under 18.

In December 2022, Mkrtchyan won the international U20 tournament held in Mansiysk, Russia.

In March 2023, Mkrtchyan competed in the European Women Chess Championship.

Mkrtchyan is a member of the Armenian women's chess team, and is the European U18 champion
