= Priyadharshan Kannappan =

Indian chess grandmaster (born 1993)

Personal information
- Born: 1 December 1993 (age 32) Madurai, India

Chess career
- Country: India
- Title: Grandmaster (2016)
- FIDE rating: 2553 (October 2026)
- Peak rating: 2554 (August 2018)

Priyadharshan Kannappan (born 1 December 1993) is an Indian chess grandmaster, FIDE Trainer, author, and entrepreneur. He is the founder and CEO of Chess Gaja Private Limited, a global online chess academy that trains hundreds of students across multiple countries. Known for his academic rigor, competitive accomplishments, and innovative contributions to online chess education, Kannappan has been a consistent force in the chess world both on and off the board.

== Biography ==
Priyadharshan was born in Madurai, Tamil Nadu, India. He learned chess at the age of 6 and quickly became one of India's most promising junior players. He moved to the United States in 2012 to pursue higher education from Lindenwood University and further his chess knowledge. That same year, he was named as the U.S. Chess League's MVP.

He completed his undergraduate degree in marketing from Lindenwood University, where he was also part of their collegiate chess team. He then earned a master's degree in management, leadership, and business analytics from Webster University, one of the strongest collegiate chess programs in the U.S. At Webster, he trained under GM Susan Polgar and contributed to the team's national championship wins.

In 2016, he achieved his final GM norm by defeating Vera Gonzalez in the Philadelphia International.

In July 2022, Priyadharshan coached the Brazilian team for the 44th Chess Olympiad on the recommendation of his fellow Webster University graduate and grandmaster André Diamant.

=== Notable students and programs ===
- Multiple students trained under Chess Gaja have achieved top-100 rankings in their USCF age categories.
- Priyadharshan also designs programs for adult improvers, particularly working professionals seeking mental fitness through chess.

== Personal life ==
Priyadharshan got his undergraduate degree in marketing from Lindenwood University and his master's degree in management, leadership, and business analytics from Webster University. During his time at Webster, he had also managed the university's chess team.

In June 2021, he started an online chess academy called Chess Gaja.
