= Ignatius Leong =

Singaporean chess player (born 1956)

Personal information
- Born: January 17, 1956 (age 70)

Chess career
- Country: Singapore (until 2024); Laos (since 2024)
- Title: FIDE Master
- Peak rating: 2320 (January 1999)

Ignatius Leong (born 1956) is a Singaporean chess player and organizer and has been one of Asia's leading organizers for more than 20 years. He was awarded by the International Chess Federation (FIDE) as an International Arbiter in 1979, International Organiser in 1995 and FIDE Senior Trainer in 2004. He was also the president of the Singapore Chess Federation from 2007-2015, Founding President and president of ASEAN Chess Confederation from 2000 to 2015, FIDE Vice President from 2002 to 2006 and FIDE General Secretary from 2005 to 2014.

At 23, he became one of the world's youngest International Arbiters. Leong is also Director of the ASEAN Chess Academy. He had played in three Chess Olympiads.

Leong once formed a "World Chess Organization", which promised to overthrow FIDE. However, he abandoned that effort when not enough people joined. He has also swung wildly between being a supporter and an opponent of FIDE President Kirsan Ilyumzhinov.

In 2002, Leong announced that he was running for FIDE President against Ilyumzhinov. Later, he changed his mind, saying that he was not running. Then, changing it again, saying that he had never withdrawn his candidacy. It was eventually ruled that once he had withdrawn, it was too late to become a candidate again, so no election was held because Ilyumzhinov was the only candidate. However, Leong became FIDE Secretary-General.

== Controversy ==
A few days before the 2014 FIDE Presidential Elections, the New York Times Magazine published a lengthy report on the Presidential Elections campaign. Included was information about a leaked contract between Garry Kasparov and Leong from Singapore, in which the Kasparov campaign reportedly "offered to pay Leong $500,000 and to pay $250,000 a year for four years to the Asean Chess Academy, an organization Leong helped create to teach the game, specifying that Leong would be responsible for delivering 11 votes from his region [...]". In September 2015, the FIDE Ethics Commission found Kasparov and Leong guilty of violating its Code of Ethics and later suspended them for two years from all FIDE functions and meetings.
