= Anastasiya Rakhmangulova =

Ukrainian chess player (born 1994)

- Rakhmangulova in 2024

Personal information
- Born: Anastasiya Andreevna Rakhmangulova; 30 December 1994 (age 31) Mykolaiv, Ukraine

Chess career
- Country: Ukraine
- Title: Woman Grandmaster (2023)
- Peak rating: 2359 (March 2026)

Anastasiya Andreevna Rakhmangulova (Ukrainian: Анастасія Андріївна Рахмангулова; born 30 December 1994 in Mykolaiv) is a Ukrainian chess player who received the FIDE title of Woman International Master (WIM) in 2012 and Woman Grandmaster (WGM) in 2023.

Anastasia is 20 times Champion of Ukraine among girls in different age categories.

In 2012, she tied for the third place in the European Girls' Under-18 Chess Championship in Prague.

Anastasiya won the Women's Ukrainian Chess Championship and Ukrainian Women's Championship (blitz) in 2015 in Lviv.
