= Yan Tianqi =

Chinese chess player (born 2002)

Personal information
- Born: May 2002 (age 24) Shandong, China

Chess career
- Country: China
- Title: Woman International Master (2022)
- Peak rating: 2378 (June 2026)

Yan Tianqi (Chinese: 颜天琪; born 2002) is a Chinese chess player who holds the title of Woman International Master.

== Chess career ==
Yan qualified for the Women's Chess World Cup 2023, where she defeated P. V. Nandhidhaa in the first round before, facing defending champion Alexandra Kosteniuk in the second round, she won on demand in the second game to force the match into tiebreaks, where she was eventually eliminated.

Yan finished sixth in the women's section of the 2020 Chinese Chess Championship.
