= Gordon Tang =

Chinese businessman

- Born: China
- Other name: Yigang Tang
- Citizenship: Chinese
- Occupation: Businessman
- Spouse: Celine Tang
- Children: 3

Gordon Tang, also known as Yigang Tang, is a Chinese billionaire businessman who owns a controlling stake in Singapore-listed property developer SingHaiyi together with his wife Celine Tang, who is CEO of the company.

== Career ==
In 1980s, Tang was a professional windsurfer from Shantou, China.

In the early 1990s, Tang and his wife expanded their business to Singapore from Guangdong, China, and the family later became permanent residents.

The chairman of SingHaiyi is Neil Bush, brother of Jeb Bush and former US president George W. Bush.

Tang is the chairman of American Pacific International Capital, Inc. (APIC).

Tang and his wife Celine on 24 November 2022 offered to buy out the remaining shares in Singapore-listed Chip Eng Seng which they did not already control in a deal which valued the property developer at approximately S$565 million.

Tang owns stakes in Singapore listed companies Suntec Reit, OKH Global and OUE Hospitality.

Tang and his wife have been linked to former Thai Prime Minister Yingluck Shinawatra, who at one time listed a house on Hong Kong's Peak registered to Gordon Tang and his wife Celine as her residential address.

Tang is reportedly the point person for concessions for Thailand's potential "entertainment complex" project under the administration of Paetongtarn Shinawatra.

== Personal life ==
Tang and his wife Celine Tang have three children.
