= Women's World Rapid Chess Championship 2025 =

Chess tournament in Doha, Qatar

FIDE Women's World Rapid Championship
- 2025
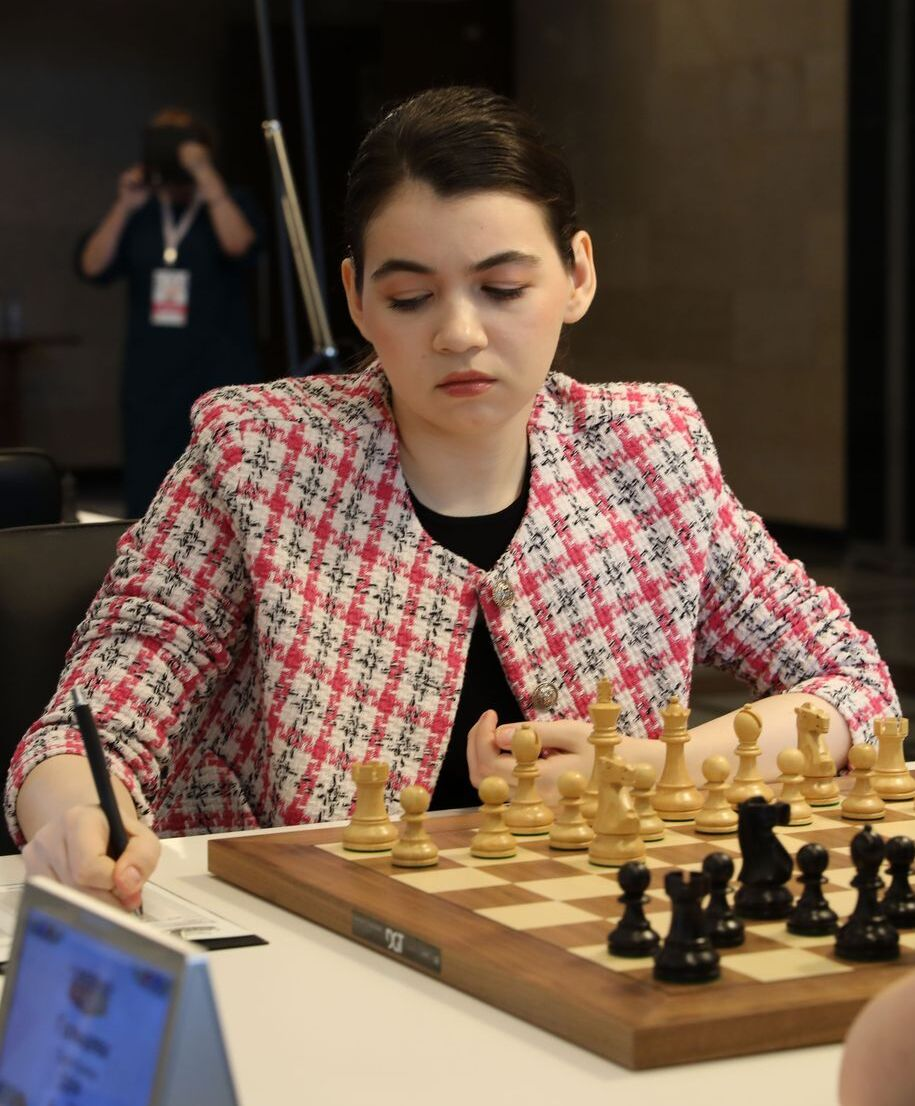
- Aleksandra Goryachkina, winner of Women's World Rapid Championship 2025

Tournament information
- Dates: December 26, 2025–December 28, 2025
- Format: Rapid (15+10)
- Host: Qatar
- Venue: Sports and Events Complex, Qatar University, Doha, Qatar

Final positions
- Champion: (FIDE) Aleksandra Goryachkina

The FIDE Women's World Rapid Championship was a chess tournament held in Doha, Qatar. The tournament was held along with the FIDE (International Chess Federation) World Rapid Chess Championship 2025, World Blitz Chess Championship 2025 and Women's World Blitz Chess Championship 2025. Aleksandra Goryachkina won the championship after defeating Zhu Jiner in blitz playoff.

== Schedule ==
Date	Event	Time	
Date	Event	AST (Local)	UTC
December 25	Arrivals	Whole day	
December 25	Media Day	Whole day	
December 25	Technical Meeting	TBD	
December 26	Opening Ceremony	1:00 pm	10:00 am
December 26	Round 1	2:00 pm	11:00 am
December 26	Round 2	3:20 pm	12:20 pm
December 26	Round 3	4:40 pm	1:40 pm
December 26	Round 4	6:00 pm	3:00 pm
December 27	Round 5	2:00 pm	11:00 am
December 27	Round 6	3:20 pm	12:20 pm
December 27	Round 7	4:40 pm	1:40 pm
December 27	Round 8	6:00 pm	3:00 pm
December 28	Round 9	2:00 pm	11:00 am
December 28	Round 10	3:20 pm	12:20 pm
December 28	Round 11	4:40 pm	1:40 pm
December 28	Play-offs (if needed)	6:10 pm	3:10 pm
December 29	No event		
December 30	Closing Ceremony	9:00 pm	6:00 pm
December 31	Departure	Whole day	

== Format ==
There will be 13 rounds according to the Swiss system. Time controls will be as follows -

- 15 minutes set as default time on the clock for each player.
- 10 seconds added on the clock of each player each time the clock is pressed starting from the first move, except for the case of making a claim.
- Additional time can be given as compensation of opponent either violated any rule or made an invalid claim. The time added, if any, shall be decided by the arbiter.

Players are given points according to their performance in the tournament. Points are awarded as follows -

- 1 Point awarded for each victory
- 0.5 Point awarded for each draw scored
- No point awarded for a loss

At the end, the players are ranked according to the total points they scored in the tournament in descending order.

When two or more players are tied for the same rank but not rank 1, the tie should be broken without any tie-breaker by Buchholz system. If there is still a tie, their average FIDE rating for Rapid games shall be taken into account, the player with higher rating shall receive a higher rank. If there is still a tie, drawing of lots shall remain the final resort to break the tie.

When two are tied for the first place, no method mentioned above shall be used. In such a case, 2 Blitz chess matches shall be played with time control 3 minutes default clock time + Increment of 2 seconds per move to determine the winner. If it ends in a draw, one sudden death game shall determine the winner.

When more than two are tied for the first place, all tied at the first position shall be ranked in the manner mentioned above in order of preference Buchholz System>FIDE rating>Drawing lots and then all not in 1st or 2nd position shall have it as their final ranking, while the two players shall play the Blitz chess matches as stated above and the winner shall occupy rank one and the loser will be given rank 2.

Finally, the person who scored rank 1 is given the title of World Rapid Chess Champion.

== Results ==
=== Swiss stage ===
The following table lists all participants, with the results from the 11 rounds. They are ranked according to the results, taking into account the tie-breaks.

Notation: "1 (W 88)" indicates a game against the player of rank 88 (Zeinab Mamedyarova) with W white pieces that resulted in a win (1 point).

Rk.	Name	Elo	1	2	3	4	5	6	7	8	9	10	11	Pts.	BC1	BS	AROC1
1	(China) Zhu Jiner	2435	1 (W 88)	1 (B 43)	1 (W 69)	1 (B 21)	½ (W 2)	½ (W 15)	½ (B 18)	1 (B 8)	½ (W 3)	1 (B 9)	½ (W 10)	8.5	72.5	77.5	2410
2	(FIDE) Aleksandra Goryachkina	2505	1 (B 67)	1 (W 66)	1 (B 48)	½ (W 20)	½ (B 1)	1 (W 25)	½ (B 15)	½ (W 3)	1 (B 22)	1 (W 16)	½ (B 6)	8.5	71.5	77	2360
3	(India) Koneru Humpy	2448	1 (W 90)	½ (B 31)	½ (W 56)	1 (B 86)	1 (W 16)	1 (B 65)	1 (W 30)	½ (B 2)	½ (B 1)	1 (W 7)	½ (B 4)	8.5	69	74	2335
4	(India) Savitha Shri B	2238	1 (B 139)	½ (W 25)	1 (B 38)	½ (W 13)	0 (W 8)	1 (B 59)	½ (W 5)	1 (B 69)	1 (W 21)	1 (B 20)	½ (W 3)	8	70.5	73	2380
5	(India) Vaishali Rameshbabu	2359	1 (B 111)	1 (W 103)	1 (B 10)	0 (W 18)	1 (B 50)	0 (W 7)	½ (B 4)	½ (W 66)	1 (B 79)	1 (W 33)	1 (B 16)	8	65	69.5	2319
6	(Turkey) Ekaterina Atalık	2328	½ (B 84)	0 (W 92)	1 (B 116)	½ (W 52)	½ (B 67)	1 (W 74)	1 (B 49)	1 (W 70)	1 (W 11)	1 (B 18)	½ (W 2)	8	62	66.5	2274
7	(China) Lei Tingjie	2496	1 (W 36)	½ (B 32)	½ (W 16)	1 (B 56)	1 (W 77)	1 (B 5)	½ (W 8)	½ (B 18)	1 (W 15)	0 (B 3)	½ (W 14)	7.5	71.5	77	2354
8	(India) Divya Deshmukh	2419	1 (B 115)	½ (W 47)	1 (B 40)	½ (W 35)	1 (B 4)	1 (W 20)	½ (B 7)	0 (W 1)	½ (B 34)	1 (W 17)	½ (B 12)	7.5	71	75.5	2318
9	(FIDE) Kateryna Lagno	2452	1 (W 104)	½ (B 16)	½ (W 31)	½ (B 47)	1 (B 71)	1 (W 35)	½ (B 12)	1 (W 13)	½ (B 17)	0 (W 1)	1 (B 30)	7.5	68.5	73	2303
10	(China) Tan Zhongyi	2507	1 (W 118)	1 (B 72)	0 (W 5)	1 (B 31)	½ (W 34)	1 (B 69)	½ (W 23)	½ (W 15)	½ (B 30)	1 (W 28)	½ (B 1)	7.5	68	72	2340
11	(Switzerland) Alexandra Kosteniuk	2450	1 (B 75)	1 (W 70)	0 (B 15)	1 (W 49)	½ (B 35)	1 (W 24)	0 (B 17)	1 (W 29)	0 (B 6)	1 (W 34)	1 (B 39)	7.5	67	72.5	2286
12	(Georgia (country)) Meri Arabidze	2333	0 (B 81)	1 (W 58)	1 (B 93)	1 (W 100)	1 (W 37)	½ (B 19)	½ (W 9)	1 (B 23)	½ (W 18)	½ (B 14)	½ (W 8)	7.5	66.5	71	2353
13	(FIDE) Polina Shuvalova	2360	1 (W 107)	½ (B 71)	1 (W 62)	½ (B 4)	½ (W 17)	½ (B 68)	1 (W 65)	0 (B 9)	1 (W 32)	½ (B 26)	1 (W 37)	7.5	65	69.5	2286
14	(Ukraine) Anna Muzychuk	2398	1 (W 68)	½ (B 101)	1 (W 110)	½ (B 32)	0 (W 65)	1 (B 63)	1 (W 27)	½ (B 30)	1 (W 31)	½ (W 12)	½ (B 7)	7.5	63	67.5	2307
15	(Georgia (country)) Nino Batsiashvili	2346	1 (B 94)	1 (W 42)	1 (W 11)	½ (B 19)	1 (W 23)	½ (B 1)	½ (W 2)	½ (B 10)	0 (B 7)	½ (W 22)	½ (B 21)	7	74	79	2413
16	(Mongolia) Bat-Erdene Mungunzul	2288	1 (W 122)	½ (W 9)	½ (B 7)	1 (W 102)	0 (B 3)	1 (B 46)	1 (W 54)	1 (B 37)	1 (W 19)	0 (B 2)	0 (W 5)	7	70.5	74.5	2376
17	(China) Chen Yining	2143	0 (B 38)	1 (W 33)	1 (B 51)	1 (W 72)	½ (B 13)	1 (W 26)	1 (W 11)	½ (B 19)	½ (W 9)	0 (B 8)	½ (W 20)	7	70	75.5	2386
18	(Ukraine) Mariya Muzychuk	2421	1 (W 96)	1 (B 120)	½ (W 65)	1 (B 5)	½ (W 30)	1 (B 54)	½ (W 1)	½ (W 7)	½ (B 12)	0 (W 6)	½ (B 24)	7	69.5	73.5	2344
19	(India) Harika Dronavalli	2435	1 (B 74)	1 (W 51)	1 (B 27)	½ (W 15)	½ (B 20)	½ (W 12)	1 (B 70)	½ (W 17)	0 (B 16)	½ (W 30)	½ (B 29)	7	67.5	73	2305
20	(Bulgaria) Antoaneta Stefanova	2379	1 (W 80)	1 (B 86)	1 (W 97)	½ (B 2)	½ (W 19)	0 (B 8)	1 (W 77)	½ (B 34)	1 (W 36)	0 (W 4)	½ (B 17)	7	67	72	2297
21	(Georgia (country)) Nana Dzagnidze	2425	1 (B 93)	1 (W 39)	1 (B 53)	0 (W 1)	½ (B 66)	0 (W 70)	1 (B 50)	1 (W 24)	0 (B 4)	1 (B 60)	½ (W 15)	7	66	71	2293
22	(Uzbekistan) Afruza Khamdamova	2365	1 (W 46)	0 (B 65)	1 (W 96)	1 (B 118)	½ (W 68)	½ (B 34)	1 (W 32)	1 (B 53)	0 (W 2)	½ (B 15)	½ (W 26)	7	64	68	2288
23	(China) Song Yuxin	2375	1 (B 100)	1 (W 109)	½ (B 24)	1 (W 71)	0 (B 15)	1 (W 66)	½ (B 10)	0 (W 12)	½ (B 39)	½ (W 31)	1 (B 58)	7	63.5	68	2295
24	(Poland) Aleksandra Maltsevskaya	2293	1 (W 82)	1 (B 140)	½ (W 23)	0 (B 30)	1 (W 74)	0 (B 11)	1 (W 89)	0 (B 21)	1 (W 41)	1 (B 52)	½ (W 18)	7	63.5	65.5	2275
25	(Georgia (country)) Bella Khotenashvili	2373	1 (W 73)	½ (B 4)	1 (W 101)	½ (B 65)	1 (W 88)	0 (B 2)	½ (W 68)	0 (B 31)	1 (W 67)	½ (B 51)	1 (W 56)	7	62	66.5	2263
26	(India) Vantika Agrawal	2321	1 (W 135)	½ (B 99)	0 (W 71)	1 (B 41)	1 (W 36)	0 (B 17)	½ (W 86)	1 (B 62)	1 (W 44)	½ (W 13)	½ (B 22)	7	62	65.5	2247
27	(FIDE) Diana Preobrazhenskaya	2306	1 (W 123)	1 (B 121)	0 (W 19)	0 (B 68)	1 (W 90)	1 (B 88)	0 (B 14)	½ (W 47)	1 (B 49)	1 (W 42)	½ (B 33)	7	59	63	2243
28	(Mongolia) Törmönkhiin Mönkhzul	2330	1 (W 85)	0 (B 97)	1 (W 80)	0 (B 88)	1 (W 118)	½ (B 86)	½ (W 62)	1 (B 65)	1 (W 68)	0 (B 10)	1 (W 51)	7	56.5	60.5	2236
29	(Armenia) Lilit Mkrtchian	2300	0 (B 42)	½ (W 94)	1 (B 119)	1 (W 107)	0 (B 87)	1 (W 92)	1 (B 105)	0 (B 11)	1 (W 90)	1 (B 36)	½ (W 19)	7	56.5	60.5	2203
30	(Spain) Sarasadat Khademalsharieh	2356	1 (B 58)	½ (W 81)	1 (B 57)	1 (W 24)	½ (B 18)	1 (W 55)	0 (B 3)	½ (W 14)	½ (W 10)	½ (B 19)	0 (W 9)	6.5	70	75.5	2373
31	(Uzbekistan) Gulrukhbegim Tokhirjonova	2286	1 (B 128)	½ (W 3)	½ (B 9)	0 (W 10)	1 (B 103)	½ (W 42)	1 (B 87)	1 (W 25)	0 (B 14)	½ (B 23)	½ (W 55)	6.5	67	70.5	2343
32	(India) Padmini Rout	2290	1 (B 105)	½ (W 7)	1 (B 81)	½ (W 14)	0 (B 55)	1 (W 73)	0 (B 22)	1 (W 50)	0 (B 13)	½ (W 47)	1 (B 74)	6.5	64	68.5	2288
33	(Netherlands) Eline Roebers	2392	0 (W 41)	0 (B 17)	1 (B 129)	1 (W 58)	½ (B 49)	1 (W 99)	½ (B 39)	1 (W 43)	1 (W 53)	0 (B 5)	½ (W 27)	6.5	64	67.5	2226
34	(Azerbaijan) Gunay Mammadzada	2315	½ (B 91)	1 (W 114)	½ (B 87)	1 (W 111)	½ (B 10)	½ (W 22)	1 (B 55)	½ (W 20)	½ (W 8)	0 (B 11)	½ (W 40)	6.5	63.5	68	2324
35	(Bulgaria) Nurgyul Salimova	2311	½ (W 89)	1 (B 95)	1 (W 41)	½ (B 8)	½ (W 11)	0 (B 9)	0 (W 36)	1 (B 57)	0 (W 52)	1 (B 90)	1 (W 75)	6.5	63	68	2255
36	(Poland) Michalina Rudzinska	2210	0 (B 7)	1 (W 105)	½ (B 78)	1 (W 38)	0 (B 26)	1 (W 102)	1 (B 35)	1 (W 48)	0 (B 20)	0 (W 29)	1 (B 72)	6.5	63	67.5	2293
37	(China) Ju Wenjun	2530	½ (B 49)	1 (W 52)	½ (B 60)	1 (W 92)	0 (B 12)	1 (W 120)	½ (B 48)	0 (W 16)	1 (B 70)	1 (W 66)	0 (B 13)	6.5	62	66	2286
38	(United States) Irina Krush	2358	1 (W 17)	½ (B 41)	0 (W 4)	0 (B 36)	1 (W 76)	½ (B 75)	1 (W 118)	½ (B 40)	0 (W 51)	1 (B 86)	1 (W 67)	6.5	62	66	2215
39	(Poland) Oliwia Kiołbasa	2270	1 (W 130)	0 (B 21)	1 (W 61)	0 (W 55)	1 (B 111)	½ (B 89)	½ (W 33)	1 (B 59)	½ (W 23)	1 (B 54)	0 (W 11)	6.5	61.5	65	2320
40	(FIDE) Anna Shukhman	2247	½ (W 95)	1 (B 76)	0 (W 8)	1 (B 78)	½ (B 99)	0 (W 48)	1 (B 100)	½ (W 38)	½ (B 45)	1 (W 53)	½ (B 34)	6.5	59.5	64	2245
41	(Argentina) Candela Francisco	2175	1 (B 33)	½ (W 38)	0 (B 35)	0 (W 26)	0 (B 119)	1 (W 128)	1 (B 102)	1 (W 71)	0 (B 24)	1 (W 77)	1 (B 66)	6.5	58.5	62	2254
42	(FIDE) Diana Khafizova	2085	1 (W 29)	0 (B 15)	0 (W 118)	1 (B 112)	1 (W 101)	½ (B 31)	0 (W 69)	1 (B 104)	1 (W 59)	0 (B 27)	1 (W 65)	6.5	58	62	2291
43	(Azerbaijan) Khanim Balajayeva	2272	1 (B 131)	0 (W 1)	0 (B 100)	½ (W 105)	1 (B 84)	½ (W 91)	1 (B 73)	0 (B 33)	1 (W 82)	1 (W 50)	½ (B 45)	6.5	58	61.5	2191
44	(Kazakhstan) Meruert Kamalidenova	2398	½ (B 57)	0 (W 87)	½ (B 91)	1 (W 80)	1 (B 109)	1 (W 47)	0 (B 53)	1 (W 56)	0 (B 26)	½ (W 79)	1 (B 71)	6.5	57.5	62	2234
45	(Vietnam) Phạm Lê Thảo Nguyên	2312	½ (W 76)	½ (B 89)	0 (W 73)	1 (B 117)	½ (W 75)	1 (B 93)	½ (W 67)	½ (B 86)	½ (W 40)	1 (B 68)	½ (W 43)	6.5	55.5	60	2193
46	(Kazakhstan) Liya Kurmangaliyeva	2157	0 (B 22)	1 (W 139)	0 (B 66)	1 (W 106)	1 (B 113)	0 (W 16)	0 (B 47)	1 (W 109)	½ (B 72)	1 (W 70)	1 (B 79)	6.5	55.5	58	2284
47	(Luxembourg) Elvira Berend	2244	1 (W 126)	½ (B 8)	½ (W 54)	½ (W 9)	½ (B 48)	0 (B 44)	1 (W 46)	½ (B 27)	½ (W 69)	½ (B 32)	½ (W 61)	6	65	69	2316
48	(FIDE) Leya Garifullina	2347	1 (W 117)	1 (B 61)	0 (W 2)	½ (B 74)	½ (W 47)	1 (B 40)	½ (W 37)	0 (B 36)	½ (W 86)	½ (B 67)	½ (W 52)	6	62	66.5	2271
49	(Azerbaijan) Govhar Beydullayeva	2224	½ (W 37)	½ (B 55)	1 (W 121)	0 (B 11)	½ (W 33)	1 (B 94)	0 (W 6)	1 (B 107)	0 (W 27)	1 (B 98)	½ (W 54)	6	62	66	2350
50	(India) Rakshitta Ravi	2082	0 (B 53)	1 (W 79)	1 (B 109)	1 (W 60)	0 (W 5)	1 (B 56)	0 (W 21)	0 (B 32)	1 (W 88)	0 (B 43)	1 (W 86)	6	61.5	66	2292
51	(China) Zhang Lanlin	2273	1 (W 137)	0 (B 19)	0 (W 17)	½ (B 61)	½ (W 78)	½ (B 82)	1 (W 94)	1 (B 96)	1 (B 38)	½ (W 25)	0 (B 28)	6	61.5	64.5	2222
52	(FIDE) Alina Bivol	2190	½ (W 55)	0 (B 37)	1 (W 108)	½ (B 6)	0 (W 59)	1 (B 125)	1 (B 106)	½ (W 60)	1 (B 35)	0 (W 24)	½ (B 48)	6	61	65	2333
53	(FIDE) Valentina Gunina	2297	1 (W 50)	1 (B 136)	0 (W 21)	0 (B 73)	1 (W 96)	1 (B 57)	1 (W 44)	0 (W 22)	0 (B 33)	0 (B 40)	1 (W 95)	6	61	64	2236
54	(Serbia) Teodora Injac	2360	½ (B 92)	1 (W 84)	½ (B 47)	1 (W 75)	1 (B 73)	0 (W 18)	0 (B 16)	1 (W 63)	½ (B 66)	0 (W 39)	½ (B 49)	6	60.5	65.5	2251
55	(Kazakhstan) Bibisara Assaubayeva	2461	½ (B 52)	½ (W 49)	1 (W 99)	1 (B 39)	1 (W 32)	0 (B 30)	0 (W 34)	½ (B 68)	0 (W 60)	1 (B 104)	½ (B 31)	6	60.5	65	2259
56	(Peru) Deysi Cori	2275	½ (B 83)	1 (W 119)	½ (B 3)	0 (W 7)	1 (B 100)	0 (W 50)	1 (B 103)	0 (B 44)	1 (W 89)	1 (W 87)	0 (B 25)	6	60	64	2245
57	(India) Priyanka Nutakki	2176	½ (W 44)	1 (B 59)	0 (W 30)	½ (B 64)	1 (B 72)	0 (W 53)	1 (B 120)	0 (W 35)	½ (W 112)	1 (B 110)	½ (W 60)	6	58	62	2318
58	(Vietnam) Võ Thị Kim Phụng	2141	0 (W 30)	0 (B 12)	1 (W 130)	0 (B 33)	1 (W 136)	½ (B 90)	1 (W 64)	½ (B 110)	1 (W 62)	1 (B 69)	0 (W 23)	6	58	61	2273
59	(United States) Carissa Yip	2369	½ (B 87)	0 (W 57)	1 (B 114)	½ (W 67)	1 (B 52)	0 (W 4)	1 (B 109)	0 (W 39)	0 (B 42)	1 (W 111)	1 (B 88)	6	57.5	62	2192
60	(Uzbekistan) Umida Omonova	2289	½ (B 119)	1 (W 83)	½ (W 37)	0 (B 50)	0 (W 89)	1 (B 123)	1 (W 88)	½ (B 52)	1 (B 55)	0 (W 21)	½ (B 57)	6	57	61	2230
61	(Georgia (country)) Kesaria Mgeladze	2123	1 (B 106)	0 (W 48)	0 (B 39)	½ (W 51)	1 (B 83)	0 (W 67)	0 (B 71)	1 (W 119)	1 (B 103)	1 (W 113)	½ (B 47)	6	54.5	58.5	2240
62	(Poland) Klaudia Kulon	2245	½ (B 129)	1 (W 127)	0 (B 13)	0 (W 99)	1 (B 114)	1 (W 119)	½ (B 28)	0 (W 26)	0 (B 58)	1 (W 89)	1 (B 91)	6	54	57.5	2154
63	(Italy) Alexandra Shvedova	2267	0 (B 102)	½ (W 116)	½ (B 83)	1 (W 138)	1 (B 81)	0 (W 14)	1 (B 99)	0 (B 54)	½ (W 78)	½ (W 91)	1 (B 87)	6	53.5	56	2133
64	(FIDE) Anastasia Bodnaruk	2311	½ (B 114)	1 (W 91)	0 (B 92)	½ (W 57)	½ (B 93)	0 (W 105)	0 (B 58)	1 (W 132)	½ (B 76)	1 (B 94)	1 (W 96)	6	51.5	55	2135
65	(FIDE) Yana Zhapova	2227	1 (B 138)	1 (W 22)	½ (B 18)	½ (W 25)	1 (B 14)	0 (W 3)	0 (B 13)	0 (W 28)	½ (B 91)	1 (W 100)	0 (B 42)	5.5	67.5	70	2305
66	(Kazakhstan) Alua Nurman	2289	1 (W 78)	0 (B 2)	1 (W 46)	1 (B 89)	½ (W 21)	0 (B 23)	1 (W 107)	½ (B 5)	½ (W 54)	0 (B 37)	0 (W 41)	5.5	66.5	71	2313
67	(Kazakhstan) Zarina Nurgaliyeva	2212	0 (W 2)	½ (B 108)	1 (W 76)	½ (B 59)	½ (W 6)	1 (B 61)	½ (B 45)	1 (W 72)	0 (B 25)	½ (W 48)	0 (B 38)	5.5	65.5	70	2311
68	(Azerbaijan) Turkan Mamedjarova	2177	0 (B 14)	1 (W 132)	1 (B 106)	1 (W 27)	½ (B 22)	½ (W 13)	½ (B 25)	½ (W 55)	0 (B 28)	0 (W 45)	½ (W 69)	5.5	65.5	69	2355
69	(Armenia) Elina Danielian	2306	1 (B 116)	1 (W 102)	0 (B 1)	½ (W 87)	1 (B 92)	0 (W 10)	1 (B 42)	0 (W 4)	½ (B 47)	0 (W 58)	½ (B 68)	5.5	62.5	67	2223
70	(Austria) Olga Badelka	2284	1 (W 124)	0 (B 11)	½ (W 107)	1 (B 95)	1 (W 94)	1 (B 21)	0 (W 19)	0 (B 6)	0 (W 37)	0 (B 46)	1 (W 99)	5.5	61.5	65.5	2268
71	(Hungary) Davaademberel Nomin-Erdene	2226	1 (W 134)	½ (W 13)	1 (B 26)	0 (B 23)	0 (W 9)	0 (B 107)	1 (W 61)	0 (B 41)	1 (W 127)	1 (B 78)	0 (W 44)	5.5	61.5	65	2237
72	(United States) Jennifer Yu	2293	1 (W 108)	0 (W 10)	1 (B 103)	0 (B 17)	0 (W 57)	1 (B 117)	1 (W 75)	0 (B 67)	½ (W 46)	1 (B 80)	0 (W 36)	5.5	59	63.5	2208
73	(FIDE) Mariya Yakimova	2159	0 (B 25)	1 (W 133)	1 (B 45)	1 (W 53)	0 (W 54)	0 (B 32)	0 (W 43)	½ (B 98)	½ (W 95)	½ (B 82)	1 (W 112)	5.5	58.5	62	2260
74	(China) Gu Xiaobing	2188	0 (W 19)	1 (B 124)	1 (W 140)	½ (W 48)	0 (B 24)	0 (B 6)	½ (W 82)	½ (W 108)	1 (B 105)	1 (B 112)	0 (W 32)	5.5	57.5	59.5	2220
75	(Kazakhstan) Elnaz Kaliakhmet	2190	0 (W 11)	1 (B 122)	1 (W 136)	0 (B 54)	½ (B 45)	½ (W 38)	0 (B 72)	½ (W 99)	1 (B 108)	1 (W 106)	0 (B 35)	5.5	56	59	2258
76	(Montenegro) Alexandra Zherebtsova	2102	½ (B 45)	0 (W 40)	0 (B 67)	1 (W 129)	0 (B 38)	1 (W 83)	0 (W 90)	1 (B 92)	½ (W 64)	½ (B 101)	1 (W 104)	5.5	55.5	59	2222
77	(Azerbaijan) Gulnar Mammadova	2293	0 (B 99)	1 (W 135)	1 (B 115)	1 (W 97)	0 (B 7)	1 (W 87)	0 (B 20)	0 (W 79)	½ (W 80)	0 (B 41)	1 (W 117)	5.5	55.5	59	2213
78	(Georgia (country)) Anastasia Kirtadze	2059	0 (B 66)	1 (B 104)	½ (W 36)	0 (W 40)	½ (B 51)	1 (W 113)	0 (B 79)	1 (W 115)	½ (B 63)	0 (W 71)	1 (B 100)	5.5	55	59.5	2239
79	(Kazakhstan) Amina Kairbekova	2240	0 (W 136)	0 (B 50)	½ (W 124)	1 (B 108)	½ (W 127)	1 (B 122)	1 (W 78)	1 (B 77)	0 (W 5)	½ (B 44)	0 (W 46)	5.5	54	57	2139
80	(China) Li Xueyi	2168	0 (B 20)	1 (W 126)	0 (B 28)	0 (B 44)	0 (W 125)	1 (W 133)	1 (B 122)	1 (W 113)	½ (B 77)	0 (W 72)	1 (B 108)	5.5	52.5	56	2189
81	(Vietnam) Hong Nhung Nguyên	2123	1 (W 12)	½ (B 30)	0 (W 32)	½ (B 101)	0 (W 63)	½ (B 96)	0 (W 104)	0 (B 127)	1 (W 131)	1 (B 130)	1 (W 110)	5.5	52	55.5	2208
82	(Egypt) Shahenda Wafa	2075	0 (B 24)	0 (B 118)	1 (W 133)	0 (W 109)	1 (B 134)	½ (W 51)	½ (B 74)	1 (W 93)	0 (B 43)	½ (W 73)	1 (B 106)	5.5	52	55.5	2196
83	(United Arab Emirates) Rouda Essa Alserkal	1999	½ (W 56)	0 (B 60)	½ (W 63)	½ (B 104)	0 (W 61)	0 (B 76)	½ (B 114)	1 (W 123)	½ (B 115)	1 (W 103)	1 (B 120)	5.5	51.5	55.5	2196
84	(Vietnam) Hong Anh Nguyên	2116	½ (W 6)	0 (B 54)	0 (W 95)	1 (B 136)	0 (W 43)	0 (B 108)	1 (W 125)	1 (B 138)	0 (W 98)	1 (B 127)	1 (W 101)	5.5	50	52.5	2130
85	(Poland) Liwia Jarocka	2117	0 (B 28)	1 (B 112)	0 (W 86)	0 (W 113)	1 (B 141)	0 (W 106)	0 (B 132)	1 (W 133)	1 (B 93)	1 (W 120)	½ (B 98)	5.5	46.5	48	2202
86	(Ukraine) Nataliya Buksa	2241	1 (B 133)	0 (W 20)	1 (B 85)	0 (W 3)	1 (B 97)	½ (W 28)	½ (B 26)	½ (W 45)	½ (B 48)	0 (W 38)	0 (B 50)	5	65	68.5	2277
87	(Armenia) Mariam Mkrtchyan	2158	½ (W 59)	1 (B 44)	½ (W 34)	½ (B 69)	1 (W 29)	0 (B 77)	0 (W 31)	½ (B 112)	1 (W 101)	0 (B 56)	0 (W 63)	5	60	64.5	2311
88	(Azerbaijan) Zeinab Mamedyarova	2188	0 (B 1)	1 (W 137)	1 (B 134)	1 (W 28)	0 (B 25)	0 (W 27)	0 (B 60)	1 (W 121)	0 (B 50)	1 (W 102)	0 (W 59)	5	59.5	62.5	2209
89	(China) Wang Chuqiao	2098	½ (B 35)	½ (W 45)	1 (B 113)	0 (W 66)	1 (B 60)	½ (W 39)	0 (B 24)	½ (W 106)	0 (B 56)	0 (B 62)	1 (W 118)	5	59	63	2288
90	(FIDE) Iren Lyutsinger	2189	0 (B 3)	1 (W 128)	0 (B 102)	1 (W 134)	0 (B 27)	½ (W 58)	1 (B 76)	1 (W 105)	0 (B 29)	0 (W 35)	½ (B 97)	5	58	61.5	2172
91	(FIDE) Veronika Shubenkova	2104	½ (W 34)	0 (B 64)	½ (W 44)	½ (B 98)	1 (W 110)	½ (B 43)	0 (W 112)	1 (B 118)	½ (W 65)	½ (B 63)	0 (W 62)	5	57	61	2298
92	(China) Jiang Tianyu	2153	½ (W 54)	1 (B 6)	1 (W 64)	0 (B 37)	0 (W 69)	0 (B 29)	0 (W 110)	0 (W 76)	½ (B 119)	1 (B 124)	1 (W 122)	5	57	61	2257
93	(Mongolia) Khishigbaatar Bayasgalan	2188	0 (W 21)	1 (B 130)	0 (W 12)	1 (B 122)	½ (W 64)	0 (W 45)	½ (B 108)	0 (B 82)	0 (W 85)	1 (W 119)	1 (B 123)	5	54.5	58	2181
94	(Armenia) Susanna Gaboyan	2134	0 (W 15)	½ (B 29)	1 (W 127)	1 (B 110)	0 (B 70)	0 (W 49)	0 (B 51)	½ (W 116)	1 (B 132)	0 (W 64)	1 (B 121)	5	54	57.5	2201
95	(Uzbekistan) Madinabonu Khalilova	1931	½ (B 40)	0 (W 35)	1 (B 84)	0 (W 70)	0 (B 107)	1 (W 131)	½ (B 115)	½ (W 103)	½ (B 73)	1 (W 109)	0 (B 53)	5	53.5	57	2216
96	(India) P. V. Nandhidhaa	2186	0 (B 18)	1 (W 131)	0 (B 22)	1 (W 140)	0 (B 53)	½ (W 81)	1 (B 119)	0 (W 51)	½ (B 102)	1 (W 121)	0 (B 64)	5	53.5	55.5	2175
97	(FIDE) Galina Mikheeva	2079	1 (W 112)	1 (W 28)	0 (B 20)	0 (B 77)	0 (W 86)	0 (B 110)	0 (W 101)	½ (B 131)	1 (W 138)	1 (B 129)	½ (W 90)	5	50	52.5	2214
98	(Romania) Irina Bulmaga	2388	0 (B 103)	0 (W 111)	1 (B 128)	½ (W 91)	½ (B 102)	0 (W 100)	1 (B 123)	½ (W 73)	1 (B 84)	0 (W 49)	½ (W 85)	5	49.5	53	2131
99	(Turkey) Aydin Gulenay	2073	1 (W 77)	½ (W 26)	0 (B 55)	1 (B 62)	½ (W 40)	0 (B 33)	0 (W 63)	½ (B 75)	0 (W 104)	1 (W 115)	0 (B 70)	4.5	59	63.5	2289
100	(India) Isha Sharma	2168	0 (W 23)	1 (B 141)	1 (W 43)	0 (B 12)	0 (W 56)	1 (B 98)	0 (W 40)	1 (B 120)	½ (W 110)	0 (B 65)	0 (W 78)	4.5	58	59.5	2269
101	(FIDE) Anna Zhurova	2253	1 (B 132)	½ (W 14)	0 (B 25)	½ (W 81)	0 (B 42)	0 (W 103)	1 (B 97)	1 (W 111)	0 (B 87)	½ (W 76)	0 (B 84)	4.5	56.5	60	2175
102	(Uzbekistan) Guldona Karimova	1960	1 (W 63)	0 (B 69)	1 (W 90)	0 (B 16)	½ (W 98)	0 (B 36)	0 (W 41)	1 (B 135)	½ (W 96)	0 (B 88)	½ (B 111)	4.5	56	59.5	2234
103	(Kazakhstan) Assel Serikbay	2173	1 (W 98)	0 (B 5)	0 (W 72)	1 (B 125)	0 (W 31)	1 (B 101)	0 (W 56)	½ (B 95)	0 (W 61)	0 (B 83)	1 (W 130)	4.5	56	59.5	2189
104	(Bulgaria) Beloslava Krasteva	2190	0 (B 9)	0 (W 78)	1 (B 131)	½ (W 83)	0 (B 105)	1 (W 116)	1 (B 81)	0 (W 42)	1 (B 99)	0 (W 55)	0 (B 76)	4.5	55.5	59	2152
105	(Estonia) Margareth Olde	2069	0 (W 32)	0 (B 36)	1 (W 141)	½ (B 43)	1 (W 104)	1 (B 64)	0 (W 29)	0 (B 90)	0 (W 74)	0 (B 117)	1 (W 127)	4.5	55.5	57	2205
106	(Bulgaria) Nadya Toncheva	2337	0 (W 61)	1 (B 117)	0 (W 68)	0 (B 46)	1 (W 137)	1 (B 85)	0 (W 52)	½ (B 89)	1 (W 107)	0 (B 75)	0 (W 82)	4.5	54.5	57.5	2142
107	(FIDE) Veronika Iudina	2149	0 (B 13)	1 (W 138)	½ (B 70)	0 (B 29)	1 (W 95)	1 (W 71)	0 (B 66)	0 (W 49)	0 (B 106)	0 (W 108)	1 (B 128)	4.5	54.5	57	2203
108	(Vietnam) Luong Phuong Hanh	2069	0 (B 72)	½ (W 67)	0 (B 52)	0 (W 79)	1 (B 129)	1 (W 84)	½ (W 93)	½ (B 74)	0 (W 75)	1 (B 107)	0 (W 80)	4.5	54	57.5	2193
109	(Georgia (country)) Inga Charkhalashvili	2235	1 (W 141)	0 (B 23)	0 (W 50)	1 (B 82)	0 (W 44)	1 (B 121)	0 (W 59)	0 (B 46)	½ (W 130)	0 (B 95)	1 (W 131)	4.5	53.5	55	2129
110	(FIDE) Olga Girya	2260	½ (B 127)	1 (W 129)	0 (B 14)	0 (W 94)	0 (B 91)	1 (W 97)	1 (B 92)	½ (W 58)	½ (B 100)	0 (W 57)	0 (B 81)	4.5	53	56.5	2143
111	(FIDE) Aliaksandra Tarasenka	2147	0 (W 5)	1 (B 98)	1 (W 120)	0 (B 34)	0 (W 39)	0 (B 118)	1 (W 130)	0 (B 101)	1 (W 136)	0 (B 59)	½ (W 102)	4.5	52.5	55.5	2235
112	(Qatar) Zhu Chen	2297	0 (B 97)	0 (W 85)	1 (B 137)	0 (W 42)	½ (B 128)	1 (W 114)	1 (B 91)	½ (W 87)	½ (B 57)	0 (W 74)	0 (B 73)	4.5	52	55	2117
113	(Italy) Aleksandra Dimitrijević	2263	0 (W 121)	1 (B 123)	0 (W 89)	1 (B 85)	0 (W 46)	0 (B 78)	1 (W 127)	0 (B 80)	1 (W 114)	0 (B 61)	½ (W 116)	4.5	51	54.5	2097
114	(Norway) Monika Machlik	2101	½ (W 64)	0 (B 34)	0 (W 59)	1 (B 124)	0 (W 62)	0 (B 112)	½ (W 83)	1 (B 137)	0 (B 113)	½ (W 132)	1 (B 133)	4.5	50	53	2172
115	(Singapore) Gong Qianyun	2185	0 (W 8)	1 (B 125)	0 (W 77)	0 (B 121)	1 (W 130)	½ (B 127)	½ (W 95)	0 (B 78)	½ (W 83)	0 (B 99)	1 (W 129)	4.5	48.5	52	2060
116	(Uzbekistan) Nilufar Yakubbaeva	2095	0 (W 69)	½ (B 63)	0 (W 6)	0 (B 127)	1 (W 124)	0 (B 104)	1 (W 129)	½ (B 94)	0 (W 120)	1 (B 137)	½ (B 113)	4.5	48.5	51.5	2169
117	(Spain) Redondo Rodriguez Adhara	2139	0 (B 48)	0 (W 106)	1 (B 132)	0 (W 45)	1 (B 131)	0 (W 72)	0 (B 121)	1 (W 124)	½ (B 128)	1 (W 105)	0 (B 77)	4.5	47.5	51	2160
118	(Hungary) Zsoka Gaal	2220	0 (B 10)	1 (W 82)	1 (B 42)	0 (W 22)	0 (B 28)	1 (W 111)	0 (B 38)	0 (W 91)	0 (B 121)	1 (W 128)	0 (B 89)	4	58.5	62	2208
119	(Poland) Katarzyna Dwilewicz	2054	½ (W 60)	0 (B 56)	0 (W 29)	1 (B 135)	1 (W 41)	0 (B 62)	0 (W 96)	0 (B 61)	½ (W 92)	0 (B 93)	1 (B 132)	4	56	59.5	2204
120	(Azerbaijan) Ulviyya Fataliyeva	2254	1 (W 125)	0 (W 18)	0 (B 111)	1 (B 123)	1 (W 121)	0 (B 37)	0 (W 57)	0 (W 100)	1 (B 116)	0 (B 85)	0 (W 83)	4	52	56	2171
121	(Azerbaijan) Malak Ismayil	1958	1 (B 113)	0 (W 27)	0 (B 49)	1 (W 115)	0 (B 120)	0 (W 109)	1 (W 117)	0 (B 88)	1 (W 118)	0 (B 96)	0 (W 94)	4	50	54	2220
122	(India) Parnali Dharia	2021	0 (B 16)	0 (W 75)	1 (B 139)	0 (W 93)	1 (B 140)	0 (W 79)	0 (W 80)	0 (B 130)	1 (W 125)	1 (B 135)	0 (B 92)	4	47	49	2096
123	(Kazakhstan) Alanna Berikkyzy	2095	0 (B 27)	0 (W 113)	1 (B 126)	0 (W 120)	1 (B 138)	0 (W 60)	0 (W 98)	0 (B 83)	1 (W 139)	1 (B 136)	0 (W 93)	4	46.5	49	2108
124	(Mexico) Tania Miranda Rodriguez	2000	0 (B 70)	0 (W 74)	½ (B 79)	0 (W 114)	0 (B 116)	1 (W 140)	½ (B 128)	0 (B 117)	(-1)	0 (W 92)	1 (W 136)	4	45.5	47.5	2110
125	(Kyrgyzstan) Assel Lesbekova	1951	0 (B 120)	0 (W 115)	1 (B 135)	0 (W 103)	1 (B 80)	0 (W 52)	0 (B 84)	0 (W 128)	0 (B 122)	(-1)	1 (W 137)	4	45	48	2136
126	(Norway) Ingrid Skaslien	1895	0 (B 47)	0 (B 80)	0 (W 123)	0 (W 128)	0 (B 132)	0 (W 129)	(-1)	1 (B 134)	0 (W 137)	1 (B 139)	1 (W 138)	4	39	41.5	1971
127	(FIDE) Olga Druzhinina	1956	½ (W 110)	0 (B 62)	0 (B 94)	1 (W 116)	½ (B 79)	½ (W 115)	0 (B 113)	1 (W 81)	0 (B 71)	0 (W 84)	0 (B 105)	3.5	51	55.5	2189
128	(Spain) Fernandez Jimenez Rebeca	2007	0 (W 31)	0 (B 90)	0 (W 98)	1 (B 126)	½ (W 112)	0 (B 41)	½ (W 124)	1 (B 125)	½ (W 117)	0 (B 118)	0 (W 107)	3.5	48.5	52.5	2179
129	(Syria) Manar Khalil	1913	½ (W 62)	0 (B 110)	0 (W 33)	0 (B 76)	0 (W 108)	1 (B 126)	0 (B 116)	(-1)	1 (W 135)	0 (W 97)	0 (B 115)	3.5	48.5	52	2171
130	(India) Charvi A.	1962	0 (B 39)	0 (W 93)	0 (B 58)	1 (W 139)	0 (B 115)	1 (W 134)	0 (B 111)	1 (W 122)	½ (B 109)	0 (W 81)	0 (B 103)	3.5	48.5	51	2120
131	(Lebanon) Nadia Fawaz	1987	0 (W 43)	0 (B 96)	0 (W 104)	1 (B 133)	0 (W 117)	0 (B 95)	1 (B 134)	½ (W 97)	0 (B 81)	1 (W 140)	0 (B 109)	3.5	47.5	49.5	2060
132	(Palestine) Eman Sawan	1935	0 (W 101)	0 (B 68)	0 (W 117)	0 (B 137)	1 (W 126)	1 (B 136)	1 (W 85)	0 (B 64)	0 (W 94)	½ (B 114)	0 (W 119)	3.5	46.5	49.5	2117
133	(Morocco) Wissal Echcharbiny	1790	0 (W 86)	0 (B 73)	0 (B 82)	0 (W 131)	(-1)	0 (B 80)	1 (W 139)	0 (B 85)	½ (W 134)	1 (B 138)	0 (W 114)	3.5	44.5	47	2026
134	(Qatar) Ghada Al-Khulaifi	1650	0 (B 71)	(-1)	0 (W 88)	0 (B 90)	0 (W 82)	0 (B 130)	0 (W 131)	0 (W 126)	½ (B 133)	1 (B 141)	1 (W 140)	3.5	41	42.5	2002
135	(China) Liu Shilan	2109	0 (B 26)	0 (B 77)	0 (W 125)	0 (W 119)	1 (B 139)	1 (W 141)	½ (B 138)	0 (W 102)	0 (B 129)	0 (W 122)	(-1)	3.5	41	42.5	1993
136	(Norway) Christine Nordahl	1787	1 (B 79)	0 (W 53)	0 (B 75)	0 (W 84)	0 (B 58)	0 (W 132)	1 (B 140)	1 (W 141)	0 (B 111)	0 (W 123)	0 (B 124)	3	46.5	48	2087
137	(Montenegro) Marija Zvereva	1989	0 (B 51)	0 (B 88)	0 (W 112)	1 (W 132)	0 (B 106)	0 (W 138)	1 (B 141)	0 (W 114)	1 (B 126)	0 (W 116)	0 (B 125)	3	43	44.5	2078
138	(Hong Kong) Chloe Hailey Lau	1674	0 (W 65)	0 (B 107)	(-1)	0 (B 63)	0 (W 123)	1 (B 137)	½ (W 135)	0 (W 84)	0 (B 97)	0 (W 133)	0 (B 126)	2.5	44.5	47	2103
139	(Saudi Arabia) Dalia Alsemairi	1712	0 (W 4)	0 (B 46)	0 (W 122)	0 (B 130)	0 (W 135)	(-1)	0 (B 133)	1 (W 140)	0 (B 123)	0 (W 126)	½ (B 141)	2.5	41.5	43	1997
140	(Saudi Arabia) Abrar Mohammed Ahmad Almalki	1594	(-1)	0 (W 24)	0 (B 74)	0 (B 96)	0 (W 122)	0 (B 124)	0 (W 136)	0 (B 139)	1 (W 141)	0 (B 131)	0 (B 134)	2	40	41.5	1987
141	(Saudi Arabia) Alotaibi Maitha Abdulrahman A	1708	0 (B 109)	0 (W 100)	0 (B 105)	(-1)	0 (W 85)	0 (B 135)	0 (W 137)	0 (B 136)	0 (B 140)	0 (W 134)	½ (W 139)	1.5	36.5	38	1982

=== First place play-off ===
Top two finishers in Swiss stage with same points advanced to the blitz play-off for first place.

Name	Blitz rating	1	2	Total
(FIDE) Aleksandra Goryachkina	2439	1	½	1½
(China) Zhu Jiner	2425	0	½	½
