= Women's Chess World Cup 2023 =

Chess tournament in Baku, Azerbaijan

FIDE Women's Chess World Cup 2023
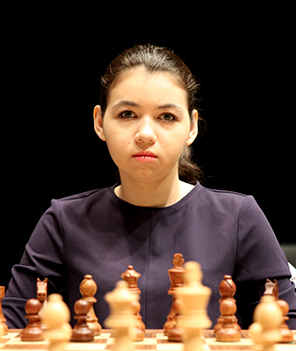
- 2023 FIDE Women's World Cup winner Alexandra Goryachkina.

Tournament information
- Sport: Chess
- Location: Baku, Azerbaijan
- Dates: 30 July 2023–21 August 2023
- Administrator: FIDE
- Tournament format: Single-elimination tournament
- Host: Azerbaijan Chess Federation
- Participants: 103

Final positions
- Champion: (FIDE) Aleksandra Goryachkina
- Runner-up: (Bulgaria) Nurgyul Salimova
- 3rd place: (Ukraine) Anna Muzychuk

The Women's Chess World Cup 2023 was a 103-player single-elimination chess tournament, the second edition of the Women's Chess World Cup, taking place in Baku, Azerbaijan, from 29 July to 22 August 2023. The runner up and third place finishers, Nurgyul Salimova and Anna Muzychuk, qualified for the Women's Candidates Tournament 2024. Since Aleksandra Goryachkina, the winner of the tournament, had already qualified through the Grand Prix, her replacement was Koneru Humpy, who was the highest-rated player on the January 2024 FIDE rating list who had played a minimum 30 games.

The tournament was held in parallel with the Chess World Cup 2023.

== Format ==
The tournament was a 7-round knockout event, with the top 25 seeds given a bye directly into the second round. The losers of the two semi-finals played a match for third place. The players who finished first, second, and third qualified for the Women's Candidates Tournament 2024.

Each round consisted of classical time limit games on the first two days, plus tie-breaks on the third day if required. The time limits were as follows:

- Two classical time limit games: 90 minutes, plus a 30-minute increment on move 40, plus a 30-second increment per move from move 1, per player.
- If the match is tied after the classical games, players will play two rapid chess games, with 25 minutes plus a 10-second increment per move, per player.
- If the match is still tied, players then will play two more rapid chess games, with 10 minutes plus a 10-second increment per move, per player.
- If the match is still tied, players then will play two blitz games, with 5 minutes plus a 3-second increment per move, per player.
- If the match is still tied, a single blitz game, with 3 minutes plus a 2-second increment per move, will be played to decide the match. A drawing of lots will determine which player plays white. If drawn, the players will switch colors and play again, until a decisive result is obtained.

=== Schedule ===
Each round lasted three days: two for classical time limit games and a third, if necessary, for tie-breaks. Rounds 1 to 3 ran from July 30 to August 7; August 8 was a rest day; Rounds 4 to 6 ran from August 9 to 17; August 18 was a rest day; and the final and third-place match ran from August 19 to 21.

=== Prize money ===
The total prize fund was US$676,250, with the first prize of US$50,000.

Prize money in US dollars
Ranking	Prizes	Total
Eliminated in Round 1	39 × 3,750	146,250
Eliminated in Round 2	32 × 5,000	160,000
Eliminated in Round 3	16 × 6,750	108,000
Eliminated in Round 4	8 × 9,500	76,000
Eliminated in Round 5	4 × 14,000	56,000
4th place	1 × 20,000	20,000
3rd place	1 × 25,000	25,000
Runner-up	1 × 35,000	35,000
Winner	1 × 50,000	50,000
Total		676,250

== Participants ==
The participants are seeded by their FIDE rating of July 2023, apart from Ju Wenjun, who is seeded first as Women's World Chess Champion.

1. Ju Wenjun (CHN), GM, 2564 (WWCC)
2. Aleksandra Goryachkina (FIDE), GM, 2557 (WWC)
3. Humpy Koneru (IND), GM, 2553 (R)
4. Kateryna Lagno (FIDE), GM, 2552 (R)
5. Alexandra Kosteniuk (SUI), GM, 2532 (WWC)
6. Tan Zhongyi (CHN), GM, 2523 (WWC)
7. Nana Dzagnidze (GEO), GM, 2511 (R)
8. Mariya Muzychuk (UKR), GM, 2511 (R)
9. Anna Muzychuk (UKR), GM, 2509 (WWC)
10. Harika Dronavalli (IND), GM, 2500 (R)
11. Zhu Jiner (CHN), WGM, 2498 (PN)
12. Polina Shuvalova (FIDE), IM, 2496 (PN)
13. Sarasadat Khademalsharieh (ESP), IM, 2488 (PN)
14. Bella Khotenashvili (GEO), GM, 2475 (E21)
15. Nino Batsiashvili (GEO), GM, 2474 (FN)
16. Elisabeth Pähtz (GER), GM, 2471 (FN)
17. Bibisara Assaubayeva (KAZ), IM, 2469 (AS21)
18. Zhao Xue (CHN), GM, 2457 (Z3.5)
19. Meri Arabidze (GEO), IM, 2451 (E21)
20. Gunay Mammadzada (AZE), IM, 2448 (E22)
21. Irina Krush (USA), GM, 2447 (Z2.1)
22. Yuliia Osmak (UKR), IM, 2444 (E21)
23. Lela Javakhishvili (GEO), IM, 2439 (E23)
24. Anna Ushenina (UKR), GM, 2434 (E22)
25. Vaishali Rameshbabu (IND), IM, 2431 (FN)
26. Eline Roebers (NED), IM, 2419 (PN)
27. Irina Bulmaga (ROU), IM, 2416 (E22)
28. Teodora Injac (SRB), IM, 2415 (E22)
29. Nurgyul Salimova (BUL), IM, 2409 (E22)
30. Leya Garifullina (FIDE), IM, 2408 (E21)
31. Hoang Thanh Trang (HUN), GM, 2402 (FN)
32. Monika Socko (POL), GM, 2401 (E22)
33. Ulviyya Fataliyeva (AZE), IM, 2401 (E22)
34. Divya Deshmukh (IND), WGM, 2400 (Z3.7)
35. Olga Badelka (FIDE), IM, 2397 (E21)
36. Oliwia Kiołbasa (POL), IM, 2394 (E21)
37. Sophie Milliet (FRA), IM, 2388 (E21)
38. Mai Narva (EST), IM, 2387 (E21)
39. Aleksandra Maltsevskaya (POL), IM, 2394 (E22)
40. Pauline Guichard (FRA), IM, 2384 (E23)
41. Salome Melia (GEO), IM, 2377 (E23)
42. Batkhuyag Munguntuul (MGL), IM, 2374 (AS23)
43. Stavroula Tsolakidou (GRE), IM, 2373 (E23)
44. Xiao Yiyi (CHN), WGM, 2372 (Z3.5)
45. Alina Bivol (FIDE), IM, 2371 (E23)
46. Deysi Cori (PER), IM, 2369 (FN)
47. Carissa Yip (USA), IM, 2369 (FN)
48. Khanim Balajayeva (AZE), WGM, 2368 (FN)
49. Nataliya Buksa (UKR), IM, 2365 (E21)
50. Gulnar Mammadova (AZE), IM, 2357 (E21)
51. Karina Cyfka (POL), IM, 2356 (E23)
52. Medina Warda Aulia (INA), IM, 2355 (FN)
53. Govhar Beydullayeva (AZE), WGM, 2355 (U20)
54. Candela Francisco (ARG), WGM, 2352 (AM23)
55. Võ Thị Kim Phụng (VIE), WGM, 2351 (Z3.3)
56. Deimante Daulyte-Cornette (FRA), IM, 2348 (E23)
57. Anastasiya Rakhmangulova (UKR), WIM, 2347 (FN)
58. Klaudia Kulon (POL), IM, 2331 (E23)
59. Mobina Alinasab (IRI), WGM, 2329 (FN)
60. P. V. Nandhidhaa (IND), WGM, 2329 (AS22)
61. Mary Ann Gomes (IND), WGM, 2326 (AS23)
62. Marina Brunello (ITA), IM, 2324 (E22)
63. Lisandra Teresa Ordaz Valdés (CUB), IM, 2318 (AM22)
64. Eva Repková (SVK), IM, 2312 (FN)
65. Nilufar Yakubbaeva (UZB), WGM, 2311 (FN)
66. Jennifer Yu (USA), WGM, 2303 (Z2.1)
67. Nutakki Priyanka (IND), WGM, 2293 (AS22)
68. Yaniela Forgas Moreno (CUB), WGM, 2293 (FN)
69. Yan Tianqi (CHN), WIM, 2277 (Z3.5)
70. Julia Ryjanova (AUS), WGM, 2273 (Z3.6)
71. Yerisbel Miranda Llanes (CUB), WGM, 2268 (Z2.3)
72. Viktoria Radeva (BUL), WGM, 2263 (FN)
73. Nadya Toncheva (BUL), FM, 2263 (E23)
74. Michalina Rudzinska (POL), WFM, 2257 (FN)
75. Javiera Belén Gómez Barrera (CHI), WIM, 2256 (FN)
76. Marina Gajcin (SRB), WIM, 2251 (FN)
77. Janelle Mae Frayna (PHI), WGM, 2243 (FN)
78. Melissa Castrillon Gomez (COL), WIM, 2235 (FN)
79. Nguyen Thi Mai Hung (VIE), WGM, 2229 (FN)
80. Turmunkh Munkhzul (MGL), WGM, 2226 (AS21)
81. Gong Qianyun (SGP), WGM, 2223 (FN)
82. Maria Jose Campos (ARG), WIM, 2212 (Z2.5)
83. Julia Alboredo (BRA), FM, 2208 (FN)
84. Zhang Jilin (AUS), WGM, 2204 (FN)
85. Maili-Jade Ouellet (CAN), WGM, 2201 (Z2.2)
86. Anapaola Borda Rodas (ARG), WIM, 2200 (FN)
87. Yuan Ye (CHN), untitled, 2188 (Z3.5)
88. Kathiê Librelato (BRA), WIM, 2182 (Z2.4)
89. Assel Serikbay (KAZ), WIM, 2139 (FN)
90. Mona Khaled (EGY), WGM, 2106 (FN)
91. Shahenda Wafa (EGY), WGM, 2093 (AF22)
92. Lina Nassr (ALG), WIM, 2071 (AF23)
93. Mitra Asgharzadeh (IRI), WFM, 2033 (Z3.1)
94. Tilsia Varela (VEN), WIM, 2028 (FN)
95. Puteri Munajjah Az-Zahraa Azhar (MAS), WIM, 2004 (FN)
96. Vyanla Punsalan (NZL), WFM, 1989 (FN)
97. Anjum Noshin (BAN), WFM, 1944 (FN)
98. Zineb Dina Abdi (ALG), WIM, 1858 (FN)
99. Wafia Darwish Al Maamari (UAE), WFM, 1850 (FN)
100. Charlize van Zyl (RSA), WIM, 1839 (AF22)
101. Nurai Sovetbekova (KGZ), WFM, 1823 (FN)
102. Ferdous Jannatul (BAN), WCM, 1815 (Z3.2)
103. Yamama Asif Abdula Al Fayyadh (IRQ), WCM, 1705 (FN)

The following 103 players qualified for the Women's World Cup:

- The Women's World Chess Champion as of 1 June 2023 (WWCC)
- The top four players in the Women's Chess World Cup 2021 (WWC)
- The 2022 World Girls Chess Champion U20 (U20)
- 53 players qualifying from Continental and Zonal events
  - Europe (18+10): including European Women's Chess Championships 2021 (E21, 10), 2022 (E22, 9), and 2023 (E23, 9)
  - Americas (4+4): including American Continental Women's Chess Championships 2022 (AM22, 1) and 2023 (AM23, 1); Zonals 2022: 2.1 (Z2.1, 2), 2.2 (Z2.2, 1) 2.3 (Z2.3, 1), and 2.4 (Z2.4, 1); Zonals 2023: 2.5 (Z2.5, 1)
  - Asia (14): including Asian Women's Chess Championships 2021 (AS21, 2) and 2023 (AS23, 2); Zonals 2023: 3.1 (Z3.1, 1), 3.2 (Z3.2, 1), 3.3 (Z3.3, 1), 3.5 (Z3.5, 4), 3.6 (Z3.6, 1), and 3.7 (Z3.7, 1)
  - Africa (3): including African Women's Chess Championships 2022 (AF22, 2) and 2023 (AF23, 1)
- The 5 highest-rated female players from the June 2023 FIDE World Rankings (Note: Players who appear inactive at least once in the 6 FIDE rating lists from January to June 2023 are not eligible.) (R)
- 36 federations spots selected according to the final standings of the 44th Chess Olympiad Main Competition (FN)
- 2 nominees of the FIDE President (PN)
- 1 nominees of the organizer (ON)

The following are the players from the list of qualifiers who declined to play, and their replacements:

- Hou Yifan (CHN), GM, 2628 (R) → Harika Dronavalli (IND), GM, 2510 (R)
- Lei Tingjie (CHN), GM, 2554 (R) → Nana Dzagnidze (GEO), GM, 2510 (R)
- Elina Danielian (ARM), GM, 2416 (E21) → Olga Badelka (FIDE), IM, 2397 (E21)
- Lilit Mkrtchian (ARM), IM, 2389 (E22) → Teodora Injac (SRB), IM, 2415 (E22)
- Anna Sargsyan (ARM), IM, 2375 (E21) → Sophie Milliet (FRA), IM, 2388 (E21)

== Pairings ==
=== Rounds 1–4 ===
==== Section 1 ====
First round
1	Ju Wenjun (CHN)	Bye
-	Bye 1
65	Nilufar Yakubbaeva (UZB)	½
64	Eva Repková (SVK)	1½
33	Ulviyya Fataliyeva (AZE)	2
96	Vyanla Punsalan (NZL)	0
97	Anjum Noshin (BAN)	½
32	Monika Socko (POL)	1½
17	Bibisara Assaubayeva (KAZ)	Bye
-	Bye 17
81	Gong Qianyun (SGP)	2
48	Khanim Balajayeva (AZE)	0
49	Nataliya Buksa (UKR)	½
80	Turmunkh Munkhzul (MGL)	1½
16	Elisabeth Pähtz (GER)	Bye
-	Bye 16

Second round
1	Ju Wenjun (CHN)	2½
64	Eva Repková (SVK)	1½
33	Ulviyya Fataliyeva (AZE)	1½
32	Monika Socko (POL)	½
17	Bibisara Assaubayeva (KAZ)	3
81	Gong Qianyun (SGP)	1
80	Turmunkh Munkhzul (MGL)	½
16	Elisabeth Pähtz (GER)	1½

Third round
1	Ju Wenjun (CHN)	1½
33	Ulviyya Fataliyeva (AZE)	½
17	Bibisara Assaubayeva (KAZ)	½
16	Elisabeth Pähtz (GER)	1½

Fourth round
1	Ju Wenjun (CHN)	1½
16	Elisabeth Pähtz (GER)	2½

==== Section 2 ====
First round
9	Anna Muzychuk (UKR)	Bye
-	Bye 9
73	Nadya Toncheva (BUL)	½
56	Deimante Daulyte-Cornette (FRA)	1½
41	Salome Melia (GEO)	2½
88	Kathiê Librelato (BRA)	1½
24	Anna Ushenina (UKR)	Bye
-	Bye 24
25	Vaishali Rameshbabu (IND)	Bye
-	Bye 25
89	Assel Serikbay (KAZ)	2½
40	Pauline Guichard (FRA)	3½
57	Anastasiya Rakhmangulova (UKR)	2½
72	Viktoria Radeva (BUL)	1½
8	Mariya Muzychuk (UKR)	Bye
-	Bye 8

Second round
9	Anna Muzychuk (UKR)	1½
56	Deimante Daulyte-Cornette (FRA)	½
41	Salome Melia (GEO)	½
24	Anna Ushenina (UKR)	1½
25	Vaishali Rameshbabu (IND)	1½
40	Pauline Guichard (FRA)	½
57	Anastasiya Rakhmangulova (UKR)	½
8	Mariya Muzychuk (UKR)	1½

Third round
9	Anna Muzychuk (UKR)	1½
24	Anna Ushenina (UKR)	½
25	Vaishali Rameshbabu (IND)	0
8	Mariya Muzychuk (UKR)	2

Fourth round
9	Anna Muzychuk (UKR)	2½
8	Mariya Muzychuk (UKR)	1½

==== Section 3 ====
First round
5	Alexandra Kosteniuk (SUI)	Bye
-	Bye 5
69	Yan Tianqi (CHN)	1½
60	P. V. Nandhidhaa (IND)	½
37	Sophie Milliet (FRA)	2
92	Lina Nassr (ALG)	0
101	Nurai Sovetbekova (KGZ)	0
28	Teodora Injac (SRB)	2
21	Irina Krush (USA)	Bye
-	Bye 21
85	Maili-Jade Ouellet (CAN)	2
44	Xiao Yiyi (CHN)	0
53	Govhar Beydullayeva (AZE)	2
76	Marina Gajcin (SRB)	0
12	Polina Shuvalova (FIDE)	Bye
-	Bye 12

Second round
5	Alexandra Kosteniuk (SUI)	2½
69	Yan Tianqi (CHN)	1½
37	Sophie Milliet (FRA)	½
28	Teodora Injac (SRB)	1½
21	Irina Krush (USA)	3
85	Maili-Jade Ouellet (CAN)	1
53	Govhar Beydullayeva (AZE)	0
12	Polina Shuvalova (FIDE)	2

Third round
5	Alexandra Kosteniuk (SUI)	1
28	Teodora Injac (SRB)	3
21	Irina Krush (USA)	½
12	Polina Shuvalova (FIDE)	1½

Fourth round
28	Teodora Injac (SRB)	½
12	Polina Shuvalova (FIDE)	1½

==== Section 4 ====
First round
13	Sarasadat Khademalsharieh (ESP)	Bye
-	Bye 13
77	Janelle Mae Frayna (PHI)	½
52	Medina Warda Aulia (INA)	1½
45	Alina Bivol (FIDE)	2
84	Zhang Jilin (AUS)	0
20	Gunay Mammadzada (AZE)	Bye
-	Bye 20
29	Nurgyul Salimova (BUL)	2
100	Charlize van Zyl (RSA)	0
93	Mitra Asgharzadeh (IRI)	½
36	Oliwia Kiołbasa (POL)	1½
61	Mary Ann Gomes (IND)	1½
68	Yaniela Forgas Moreno (CUB)	½
4	Kateryna Lagno (FIDE)	Bye
-	Bye 4

Second round
13	Sarasadat Khademalsharieh (ESP)	½
52	Medina Warda Aulia (INA)	1½
45	Alina Bivol (FIDE)	1½
20	Gunay Mammadzada (AZE)	½
29	Nurgyul Salimova (BUL)	1½
36	Oliwia Kiołbasa (POL)	½
61	Mary Ann Gomes (IND)	2½
4	Kateryna Lagno (FIDE)	1½

Third round
52	Medina Warda Aulia (INA)	1½
45	Alina Bivol (FIDE)	½
29	Nurgyul Salimova (BUL)	2
61	Mary Ann Gomes (IND)	0

Fourth round
52	Medina Warda Aulia (INA)	1½
29	Nurgyul Salimova (BUL)	2½

==== Section 5 ====
First round
3	Humpy Koneru (IND)	Bye
-	Bye 3
67	Nutakki Priyanka (IND)	2½
62	Marina Brunello (ITA)	1½
35	Olga Badelka (FIDE)	2
94	Tilsia Varela (VEN)	0
99	Wafia Darwish Al Maamari (UAE)	½
30	Leya Garifullina (FIDE)	1½
19	Meri Arabidze (GEO)	Bye
-	Bye 19
83	Julia Alboredo (BRA)	1½
46	Deysi Cori (PER)	2½
51	Karina Cyfka (POL)	3
78	Melissa Castrillon Gomez (COL)	1
14	Bella Khotenashvili (GEO)	Bye
-	Bye 14

Second round
3	Humpy Koneru (IND)	1½
67	Nutakki Priyanka (IND)	½
35	Olga Badelka (FIDE)	1½
30	Leya Garifullina (FIDE)	½
19	Meri Arabidze (GEO)	2½
46	Deysi Cori (PER)	1½
51	Karina Cyfka (POL)	½
14	Bella Khotenashvili (GEO)	1½

Third round
3	Humpy Koneru (IND)	1½
35	Olga Badelka (FIDE)	½
19	Meri Arabidze (GEO)	½
14	Bella Khotenashvili (GEO)	1½

Fourth round
3	Humpy Koneru (IND)	1
14	Bella Khotenashvili (GEO)	3

==== Section 6 ====
First round
11	Zhu Jiner (CHN)	Bye
-	Bye 11
75	Javiera Belén Gómez Barrera (CHI)	1½
54	Candela Francisco (ARG)	2½
43	Stavroula Tsolakidou (GRE)	1½
86	Anapaola Borda Rodas (ARG)	½
22	Yuliia Osmak (UKR)	Bye
-	Bye 22
27	Irina Bulmaga (ROU)	2
102	Ferdous Jannatul (BAN)	0
91	Shahenda Wafa (EGY)	½
38	Mai Narva (EST)	1½
59	Mobina Alinasab (IRI)	0
70	Julia Ryjanova (AUS)	2
6	Tan Zhongyi (CHN)	Bye
-	Bye 6

Second round
11	Zhu Jiner (CHN)	1½
54	Candela Francisco (ARG)	½
43	Stavroula Tsolakidou (GRE)	½
22	Yuliia Osmak (UKR)	1½
27	Irina Bulmaga (ROU)	2½
38	Mai Narva (EST)	3½
70	Julia Ryjanova (AUS)	½
6	Tan Zhongyi (CHN)	1½

Third round
11	Zhu Jiner (CHN)	3
22	Yuliia Osmak (UKR)	1
38	Mai Narva (EST)	2
6	Tan Zhongyi (CHN)	4

Fourth round
11	Zhu Jiner (CHN)	½
6	Tan Zhongyi (CHN)	1½

==== Section 7 ====
First round
7	Nana Dzagnidze (GEO)	Bye
-	Bye 7
71	Yerisbel Miranda Llanes (CUB)	½
58	Klaudia Kulon (POL)	1½
39	Aleksandra Maltsevskaya (POL)
90	Mona Khaled (EGY)	w/o
103	Yamama Asif Abdula Al Fayyadh (IRQ)	0
26	Eline Roebers (NED)	2
23	Lela Javakhishvili (GEO)	Bye
-	Bye 23
87	Yuan Ye (CHN)	1½
42	Batkhuyag Munguntuul (MGL)	2½
55	Võ Thị Kim Phụng (VIE)	1
74	Michalina Rudzinska (POL)	3
10	Harika Dronavalli (IND)	Bye
-	Bye 10

Second round
7	Nana Dzagnidze (GEO)	1½
58	Klaudia Kulon (POL)	2½
90	Mona Khaled (EGY)	0
26	Eline Roebers (NED)	2
23	Lela Javakhishvili (GEO)	1½
42	Batkhuyag Munguntuul (MGL)	½
74	Michalina Rudzinska (POL)	0
10	Harika Dronavalli (IND)	2

Third round
58	Klaudia Kulon (POL)	0
26	Eline Roebers (NED)	2
23	Lela Javakhishvili (GEO)	4½
10	Harika Dronavalli (IND)	5½

Fourth round
26	Eline Roebers (NED)	1½
10	Harika Dronavalli (IND)	2½

==== Section 8 ====
First round
15	Nino Batsiashvili (GEO)	Bye
-	Bye 15
79	Nguyen Thi Mai Hung (VIE)	½
50	Gulnar Mammadova (AZE)	1½
47	Carissa Yip (USA)	2
82	Maria Jose Campos (ARG)	0
18	Zhao Xue (CHN)	Bye
-	Bye 18
31	Hoang Thanh Trang (HUN)	2
98	Zineb Dina Abdi (ALG)	0
95	Puteri Munajjah Az-Zahraa Azhar (MAS)	½
34	Divya Deshmukh (IND)	1½
63	Lisandra Teresa Ordaz Valdés (CUB)	1½
66	Jennifer Yu (USA)	½
2	Aleksandra Goryachkina (FIDE)	Bye
-	Bye 2

Second round
15	Nino Batsiashvili (GEO)	1½
50	Gulnar Mammadova (AZE)	½
47	Carissa Yip (USA)	1½
18	Zhao Xue (CHN)	2½
31	Hoang Thanh Trang (HUN)	½
34	Divya Deshmukh (IND)	1½
63	Lisandra Teresa Ordaz Valdés (CUB)	½
2	Aleksandra Goryachkina (FIDE)	1½

Third round
15	Nino Batsiashvili (GEO)	1½
18	Zhao Xue (CHN)	½
34	Divya Deshmukh (IND)	½
2	Aleksandra Goryachkina (FIDE)	1½

Fourth round
15	Nino Batsiashvili (GEO)	½
2	Aleksandra Goryachkina (FIDE)	1½

== Rounds 5–7 ==
Quarterfinals
16	Elisabeth Pähtz (GER)	3½
9	Anna Muzychuk (UKR)	4½
12	Polina Shuvalova (FIDE)	1
29	Nurgyul Salimova (BUL)	3
14	Bella Khotenashvili (GEO)	½
6	Tan Zhongyi (CHN)	1½
10	Harika Dronavalli (IND)	3½
2	Aleksandra Goryachkina (FIDE)	4½

Semifinals
9	Anna Muzychuk (UKR)	2½
29	Nurgyul Salimova (BUL)	3½
6	Tan Zhongyi (CHN)	½
2	Aleksandra Goryachkina (FIDE)	1½

Finals
29	Nurgyul Salimova (BUL)	1½
2	Aleksandra Goryachkina (FIDE)	2½
3rd Place
9	Anna Muzychuk (UKR)	1½
6	Tan Zhongyi (CHN)	½

=== Third place ===
Seed	Name	Jul 2023 rating	1	2	Total
9	(Ukraine) Anna Muzychuk	2509	1	½	1½
6	(China) Tan Zhongyi	2523	0	½	½

=== Finals ===
Seed	Name	Jul 2023 rating	1	2	Tb1	Tb2	Total
29	(Bulgaria) Nurgyul Salimova	2409	½	½	½	0	1½
2	(FIDE) Aleksandra Goryachkina	2557	½	½	½	1	2½
