= 2022 European Individual Chess Championship =

Supranational chess championship

- Location: Brežice, Slovenia
- Dates: 27 March–6 April
- Website: www.eicc2022.eu

Medalists
| gold medal | Matthias Blübaum |
| silver medal | Gabriel Sargissian |
| bronze medal | Ivan Šarić |

Champions
- Women: Govhar Beydullayeva

The 2022 European Individual Chess Championship was held from 27 March to 6 April 2022 in Brežice, Slovenia. In open competition, Matthias Blübaum and Gabriel Sargissian tied for first, with Blübaum securing the gold and Sargissian the silver via tie-breaking criteria. Multiple players tied for third place, with Ivan Šarić receiving the bronze via tie-breaking criteria. In the women's competition, medalists were Govhar Beydullayeva, Nurgyul Salimova, and Nataliya Buksa for gold, silver, and bronze, respectively. Zdenko Kožul won gold among senior players.

== Results ==
The top eight finishers after all 11 rounds of the open competition were:

| # | Player | Nation | Rating | Points |
|---|---|---|---|---|
| 1 | Matthias Blübaum | Germany | 2642 | 8,5 |
| 2 | Gabriel Sargissian | Armenia | 2681 | 8,5 |
| 3 | Ivan Šarić | Croatia | 2687 | 8,0 |
| 4 | Ivan Cheparinov | Bulgaria† | 2672 | 8,0 |
| 5 | Jaime Santos Latasa | Spain | 2648 | 8,0 |
| 6 | Mustafa Yılmaz | Turkey | 2624 | 8,0 |
| 7 | Ruslan Ponomariov | Ukraine | 2636 | 8,0 |
| 8 | Vasif Durarbayli | Azerbaijan | 2628 | 8,0 |

† Cheparinov competed under the flag of the European Chess Union.
