= Vyanla Punsalan =

New Zealand chess player (born 2004)

Personal information
- Born: 2004 (age 21–22)

Chess career
- Country: New Zealand
- Title: Woman FIDE Master (2018)
- Peak rating: 1991 (March 2024)

Vyanla M. Punsalan (born in 2004) is a New Zealand chess Woman FIDE Master (WFM), and the 2022 New Zealand Women's Chess Champion.

== Chess career ==
In 2022 Punsalan won New Zealand Women's Chess Championship. In 2023 she ranked in 3rd place in Oceania Zonal Chess tournament.

In 2023, Punsalan participated in single-elimination Women's Chess World Cup in Baku, losing in the first round to Azerbaijani Woman Grandmaster Ulviyya Fataliyeva.

Punsalan played for New Zealand in the Women's Chess Olympiads:

- In 2018, at second board in the 43rd Chess Olympiad (women) in Batumi (+5=2−3).
- In 2022, at second board in the 44th Chess Olympiad (women) in Chennai (+7=2−1).

In 2018, she was awarded the Women FIDE Master (WFM) title.
