= Asgharzadeh =

Asgharzadeh (Persian: اصغرزاده) is an Iranian surname. Notable people with the surname include:

- Ebrahim Asgharzadeh, Iranian political activist and politician
- Fereydoun Asgharzadeh, Iranian football coach
- Mitra Asgharzadeh (born 2002), Iranian chess master
