= Marina Gajcin =

Serbian chess player

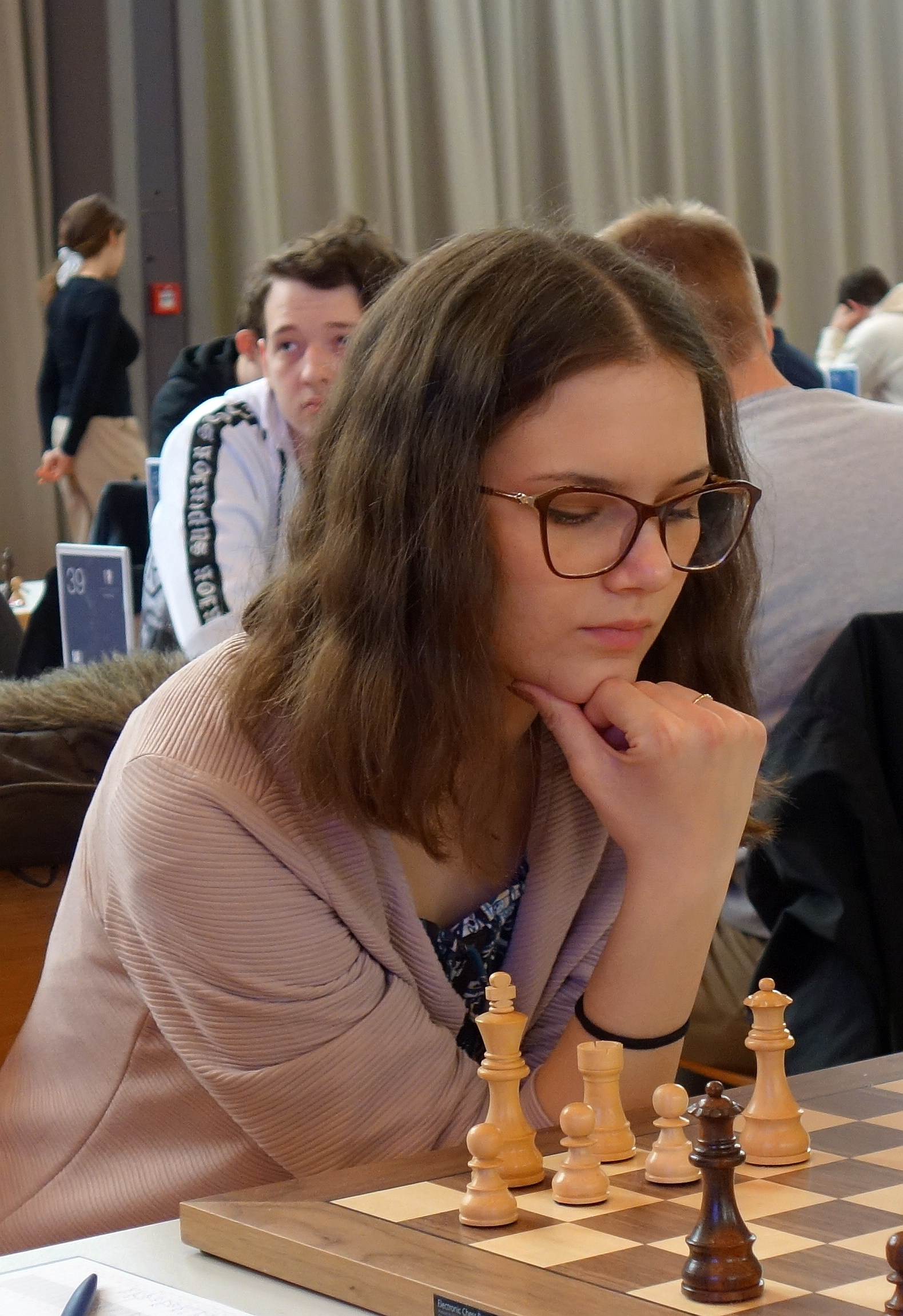
- Marina Gajcin in 2024

Personal information
- Born: April 8, 2001 (age 25)

Chess career
- Country: Serbia
- Title: Woman Grandmaster (2023)
- Peak rating: 2306 (December 2017)

Marina Gajcin (born 8 April 2001) is a Serbian chess player who holds the title of Woman Grandmaster, which she earned in 2023.

== Chess career ==
Gajcin represented Serbia in the 2022 Women's Chess Olympiad, finishing on 6/8 on board 4.

Gajcin won the women's section of the 2023 Serbian Chess Championship, finishing on 7.5/9, two points ahead of second place.

She qualified for the Women's Chess World Cup 2023, where she was defeated by Govhar Beydullayeva in the first round.
