= Yamama Asif Abdula Al Fayyadh =

Iraqi chess player (born 2001)

Personal information
- Born: 2001 (age 24–25)

Chess career
- Country: Iraq
- Title: Woman Candidate Master (2014)
- Peak rating: 1838 (June 2026)

Yamama Asif Abdula Al Fayyadh (born 2001) is an Iraqi chess player who holds the title of Woman Candidate Master, which she earned in 2014.

== Chess career ==
She started playing chess at age nine after learning from her father. She represented Iraq in the 44th Chess Olympiad, playing alongside her sister Zainab Asif Abdulah Al-Fayyadh, and finishing on 4/8 on board five.

She qualified for the Women's Chess World Cup 2023, where she was defeated by Eline Roebers in the first round.
