= Zineb Dina Abdi =

Algerian chess player (born 1996)

Personal information
- Born: 1996 (age 29–30)

Chess career
- Country: Algeria
- Title: Woman International Master (2013)
- Peak rating: 1981 (October 2017)

Zineb Dina Abdi (born in 1996) is an Algerian chess Woman International Master (WIM) (2013).

== Chess career ==
In 2013, Abdi ranked in 2nd place in Algerian Women's Chess Championship.

In 2016, she won Arabian Girl's Chess Championship in U20 age group. In 2021 she won Algerian Women's Chess Championship.

In 2023, in Baku, Abdi participated in single-elimination Women's Chess World Cup and lost in 1st round to Hungarian Woman Grandmaster Hoang Thanh Trang.

Zineb Dina Abdi played for Algeria in the Women's Chess Olympiads:

- In 2010, at reserve board in the 39th Chess Olympiad (women) in Khanty-Mansiysk (+0, =3, -2),
- In 2012, at fourth board in the 40th Chess Olympiad (women) in Istanbul (+5, =1, -2),
- In 2016, at fourth board in the 42nd Chess Olympiad (women) in Baku (+4, =3, -2),
- In 2022, at third board in the 44th Chess Olympiad (women) in Chennai (+5, =2, -3).

In 2013, she was awarded the FIDE Women International Master (WIM) title.
