= Yaniela Forgas Moreno =

Cuban chess player (born 1992)

Personal information
- Born: 3 January 1992 (age 34)

Chess career
- Country: Cuba
- Title: Woman Grandmaster (2022)
- Peak rating: 2355 (August 2022)

Yaniela Forgas Moreno (born 3 January 1992) is a Cuban chess Woman Grandmaster (WGM) (2022).

== Chess career ==
In 2022 Yaniela Forgas Moreno won bronze medal in Cuban Women's Chess Championship. In 2022 she won Cuban Women's Chess Championship.

In 2023, in Baku Yaniela Forgas Moreno participated in single-elimination Women's Chess World Cup and lost in 1st round to Indian Woman Grandmaster Mary Ann Gomes.

Yaniela Forgas Moreno played for Cuba in the Women's Chess Olympiad:

- In 2022, at fourth board in the 44th Chess Olympiad (women) in Chennai (+7, =1, -2).

In 2017, she was awarded the FIDE Women International Master (WIM) title and received the FIDE Women Grandmaster (WGM) title five years later.
