= María José Campos =

Argentine chess player

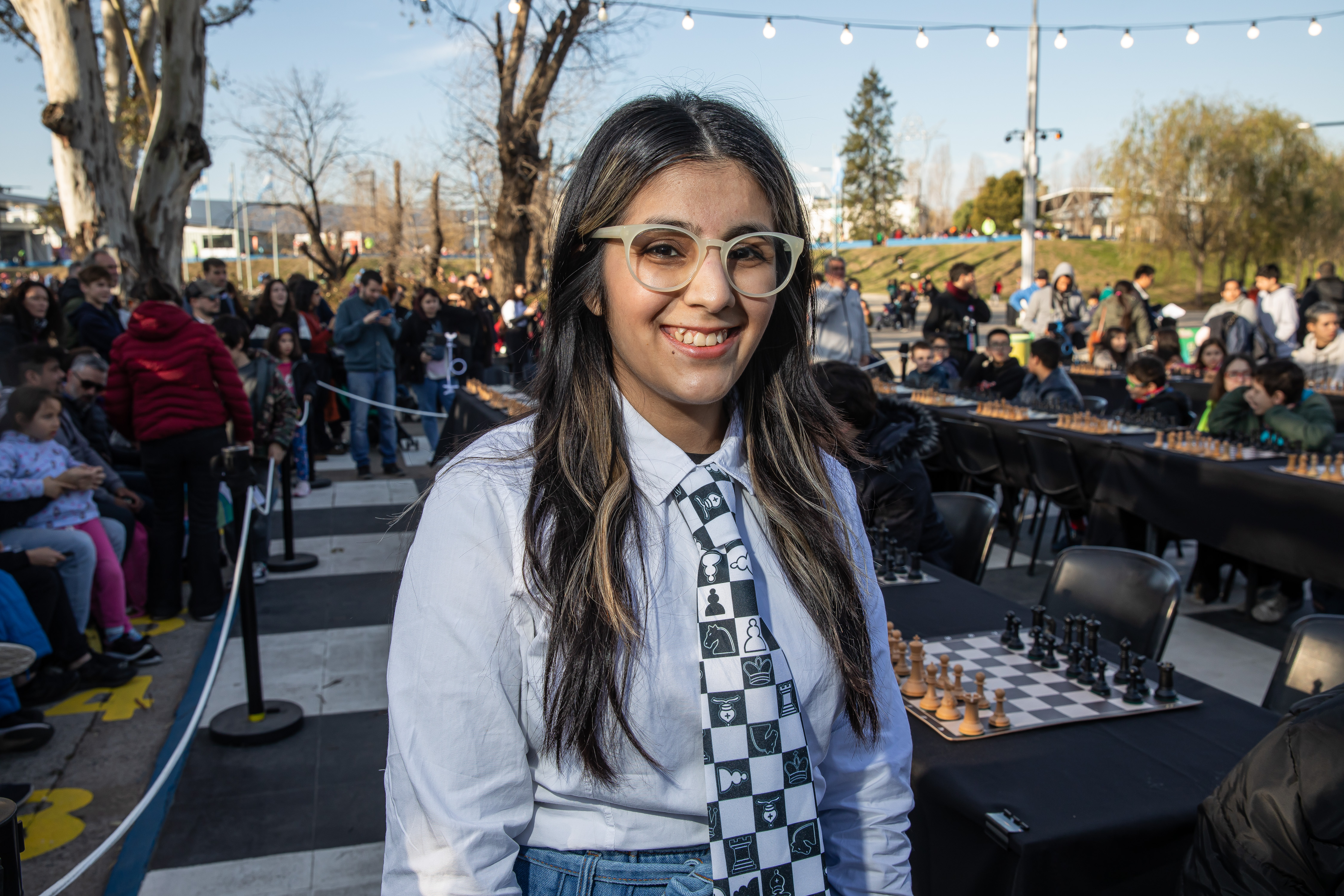

Personal information
- Born: 1999 (age 26–27)

Chess career
- Country: Argentina
- Title: Woman International Master (2023)
- Peak rating: 2281 (July 2024)

María José Campos (born 1999) is an Argentine chess player who holds the title of Woman International Master, which she earned in 2023.

== Chess career ==
Jose Campos represented Argentina in the 2022 Women's Chess Olympiad, finishing on 6.5/11 on board 2.

She qualified for the Women's Chess World Cup 2023, where she was defeated by Carissa Yip in the first round.
