= Anapaola Borda Rodas =

Argentine chess player (born 2004)

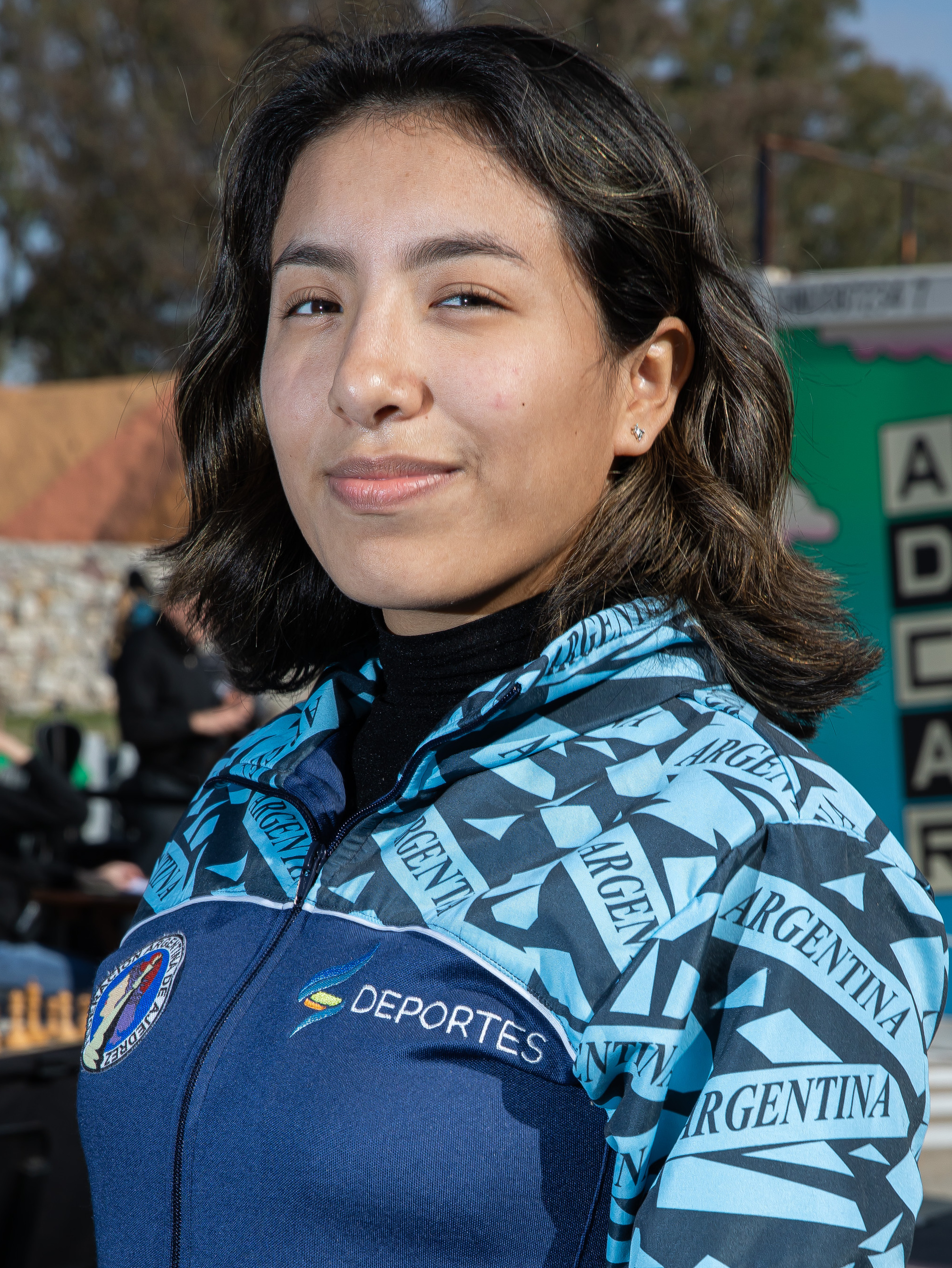
- Borda Rodas in 2023

Personal information
- Born: Anapaola Suri Borda Rodas; February 25, 2004 (age 22) Lima, Peru

Chess career
- Country: Argentina
- Title: Woman International Master (2022)
- Peak rating: 2282 (October 2023)

Anapaola Suri Borda Rodas (born 25 February 2004) is an Argentine chess Woman International Master (WIM) (2022).

== Chess career ==
In 2022 Anapaola Borda Rodas won bronze medal in Argentine Women's Chess Championship.

In 2023, she won South American Junior Chess Championship in U20 girls group and ranked in 3rd place in South American Zonal Chess tournament and won the right to participate in the Women's Chess World Cup.

In 2023, in Baku Anapaola Borda Rodas participated in single-elimination Women's Chess World Cup and lost in 1st round to Greek Woman Grandmaster Stavroula Tsolakidou.

Anapaola Borda Rodas played for Argentina in the Women's Chess Olympiad:

- In 2022, at third board in the 44th Chess Olympiad (women) in Chennai (+5, =4, -2).

In 2022, she was awarded the FIDE Women International Master (WIM) title.
