= Eline Roebers =

Dutch chess player (born 2006)

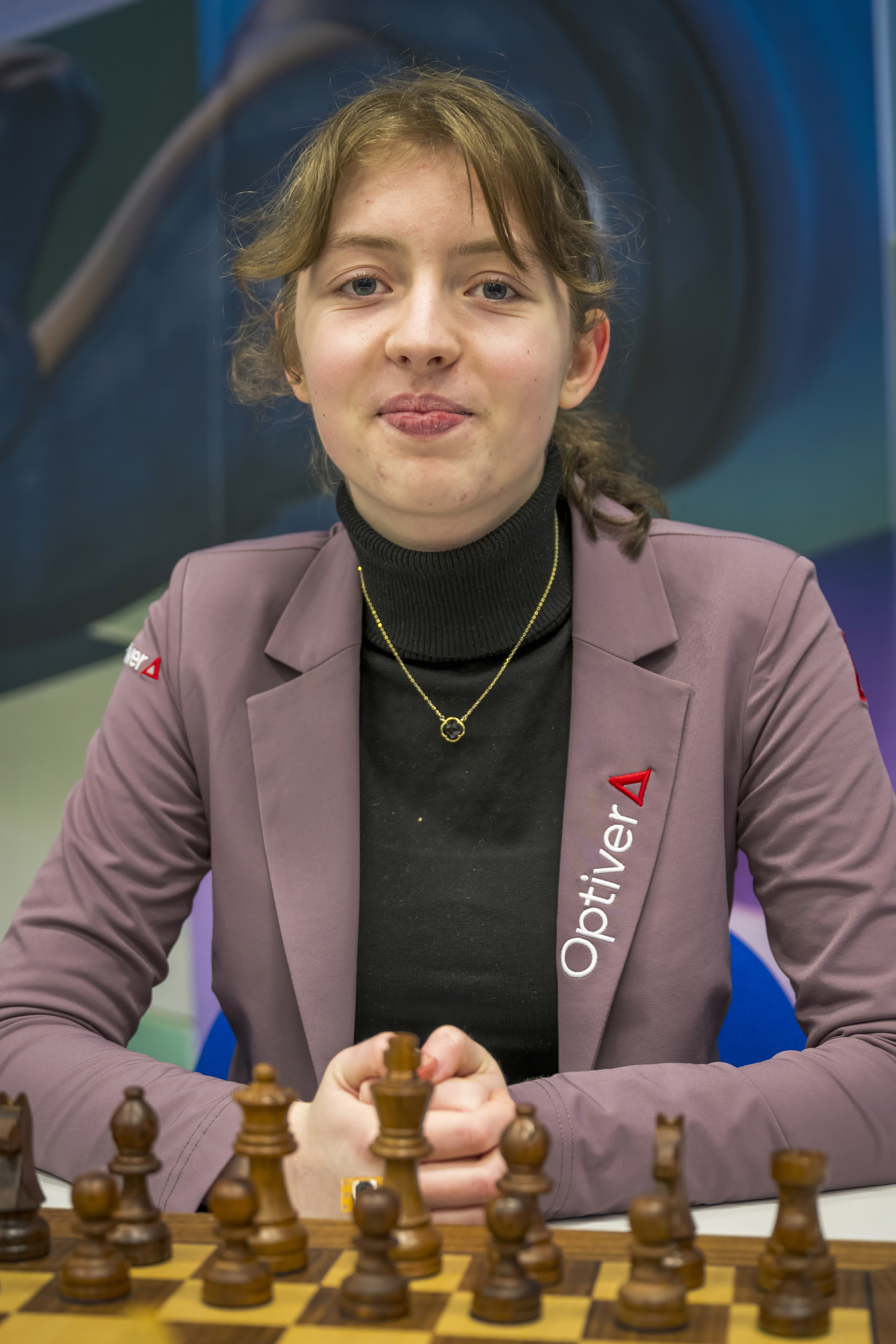
- Roebers at the Tata Steel Chess Tournament 2024

Personal information
- Born: 22 May 2006 (age 20) Amsterdam, Netherlands

Chess career
- Country: Netherlands
- Title: International Master (2022)
- FIDE rating: 2401 (October 2026)
- Peak rating: 2429 (November 2026)

Eline Roebers (born 22 May 2006) is a Dutch chess player who holds the title of International Master. She is a former Dutch Women's Champion and was the 2022 Dutch Youth Champion in the open division. Roebers was the 2020 online World Youth Champion in the under-14 girls' division, and was the first Dutch player to win a World Youth Championship in any category. Roebers began playing chess at age seven and she has been coached by Dutch International Master Robert Ris. Her father Jan is a FIDE Master (FM). She won an individual bronze medal on the second board at the European Women's Team Championship in 2021.

== Chess career ==
=== 2021 ===
Roebers won the Brugse Meesters in Belgium in August 2021, finishing in joint first with a score of 7½/9 and having the better tiebreak criteria.

=== 2022 ===
She also became the youngest player and first woman to win the Untergrombach Open in Germany in January 2022, defeating Russian Grandmaster Vyacheslav Ikonnikov in the final round to finish in clear first with a score of 6½/7. In 2022, Roebers played board 1 for Dutch women at the 44th Chess Olympiad in Chennai, with a score of 7.5/10 (+6-1=3) (Note: 6 wins against WIM Rachel Miller (1961), WGM Maili-Jade Ouellet (2042), WGM Janelle Mae Frayna (2224), GM Marie Sebag (2447), WGM Deysi Cori T. (2371) and WGM Julia Ryjanova (2284); 3 draws against WIM Mobina Alinasab (2364), IM Alina Kashlinskaya (2505) and GM Mariya Muzychuk (2540); 1 loss against GM Pia Cramling (2459)) and a TPR of 2532 which earned her an individual silver medal for her board 1 performance.

=== 2023 ===
As the lowest-rated player in the tournament, she defeated GM Erwin L'Ami in the Tata Steel Challengers 2023 tournament in the 2nd round after losing the first round to prodigy Abhimanyu Mishra.

She played in the Women's Chess World Cup 2023, defeating Yamama Asif Abdula Al Fayyadh, Mona Khaled and Klaudia Kulon, all by 2-0 margins, before being eliminated by Harika Dronavalli in the fourth round.

She was ranked as the highest-rated woman of 18 years and younger on the August 2023 World FIDE standard rating list at a rating of 2407.

=== 2024 ===
Roebers competed in the Tata Steel Challengers 2024 tournament, again as the lowest-rated player. At the tournament, she (rated 2381) defeated the top two seeds Hans Niemann (rated 2692) and Mustafa Yılmaz (rated 2665), though she lost all of her other games. In August 2024, she was the best among women in the "Riga Technical University Open" tournament "A".

=== Notable game ===
Roebers vs. L'Ami 2023

Position: a8 black rook, c8 black bishop, f8 black rook, h8 black king, e7 black knight, h7 black pawn, d6 black pawn, f6 white pawn, b5 black pawn, d5 white pawn, e5 white bishop, g5 black pawn, h5 black queen, a4 black pawn, c4 black pawn, e4 white pawn, f4 white queen, a3 white pawn, c3 white pawn, e3 white rook, b2 white pawn, c2 white bishop, h2 white knight, a1 white rook, f1 white king

After 35.Bxe5!

Roebers vs. L'Ami, Tata Steel (Challengers), 2023. Against a 2600-rated Grandmaster, Roebers sacrificed her queen on move 35 (diagram), regaining a number of pieces and forcing resignation 11 moves later.
