= Nurai Sovetbekova =

Kyrgyzstani chess player (born 2005)

Personal information
- Born: 2005 (age 20–21)

Chess career
- Country: Kyrgyzstan
- Title: Woman FIDE Master (2022)
- Peak rating: 2070 (January 2026)

Nurai Sovetbekova (born in 2005) is a Kyrgyz chess Woman FIDE Master (WFM) (2022), Kyrgyzstani Women's Chess Championship winner (2023).

== Chess career ==
In 2019 Sovetbekova won Kyrgyzstani Youth Chess Championship in girl's U14 age group. After a year she repeated this success in girl's U16 age group.

In 2023 she won the Kyrgyzstani Women's Chess Championship.

In 2023, in Baku Sovetbekova participated in single-elimination Women's Chess World Cup and lost in 1st round to Serbian Woman Grandmaster Teodora Injac.

Sovetbekova played for Kyrgyzstan in the Women's Chess Olympiads:

- In 2022, at fourth board in the 44th Chess Olympiad (women) in Chennai (+9, =0, -3).

In 2022, she was awarded the Women FIDE Master (WFM) title.
