= Yuan Ye (chess player) =

South African chess player

Personal information
- Born: 2000 (age 25–26)

Chess career
- Country: China
- Peak rating: 2321 (September 2016)

Yuan Ye (born 2000) is a Chinese chess player. Although not holding any FIDE titles, she has a peak rating of 2321, above the rating requirement for a Woman Grandmaster.

== Chess career ==
She was one of the four qualifiers from the Zone 3.5 qualifiers to qualify for the Women's Chess World Cup 2023, where she was defeated by Batkhuyagiin Möngöntuul in the first round.
