= Xiao Yiyi =

Chinese chess player (born 1996)

Personal information
- Born: August 29, 1996 (age 29) Chongqing, China

Chess career
- Country: China
- Title: Woman Grandmaster (2020)
- Peak rating: 2394 (May 2023)

Xiao Yiyi (Chinese: 肖依依; born August 29, 1996) is a Chinese chess player who holds the title of Woman Grandmaster.

== Chess career ==
Xiao Yiyi won the Asian Girls Under-16 Championship in 2012, earning the Woman FIDE Master title. In 2014, she finished third, with 8 points out of 11, in the women's section of the Under-18 World Youth Chess Championship.

She has twice finished runner-up in the women's section of the Chinese Chess Championship, in 2019, and in 2022.

After qualifying through the Asian zonals, she competed in the Women's Chess World Cup 2023, where she was defeated by Maili-Jade Ouellet in the first round.
