= Aleksandra Dimitrijević =

Serbian chess player (born 1986)

Personal information
- Born: 3 October 1986 (age 39) Belgrade, SR Serbia, SFR Yugoslavia

Chess career
- Country: Serbia (until 2010; 2018−2023); Bosnia and Herzegovina (2010−2018); Italy (since 2023)
- Title: Woman Grandmaster (2014)
- Peak rating: 2383 (July 2003)

Aleksandra Dimitrijević (Serbian Cyrillic: Александра Димитријевић; born 3 October 1986) is a Serbian chess player who holds the FIDE title of Woman Grandmaster (WGM). She is also a FIDE International Arbiter and a FIDE Trainer.

== Career ==
Dimitrijević began playing chess at the age of two. She was a student of Serbian Grandmaster Borislav Ivkov.

In 2012, Dimitrijević became a FIDE trainer. In 2014, she was awarded the title of Woman Grandmaster, the highest FIDE title awarded to women only. In 2017, she became an International Arbiter. She has competed in four Chess Olympiads for Bosnia and Herzegovina.

Currently, Dimitrijević is based in Venice, Italy. Since 2024, she has been the director of the FIDE-recognized Queen Club Mitropa Chess Academy.
