= Nadya Toncheva =

Bulgarian chess player (born 2005)

Personal information
- Born: December 5, 2005 (age 20) Sofia, Bulgaria

Chess career
- Country: Bulgaria
- Title: FIDE Master (2021); Woman Grandmaster (2024)
- Peak rating: 2408 (September 2026)

Nadya Toncheva (Bulgarian: Надя Тончева) is a Bulgarian chess Woman Grandmaster (WGM) (2024).

== Chess career ==
Nadya Toncheva began playing chess at the age of seven. Since 2016 she has been coached by Bulgarian Grandmaster Vladimir Dimitrov.

In 2022, Nadya Toncheva won a silver medal in the Bulgarian Women Individual Rapid Chess Championship. In 2023 she won a bronze medal in the Bulgarian Women's Chess Championship. In March 2023 in Petrovac, Budva she finished 9th in the European Individual Chess Championship. In April 2024 in Rhodes, Greece she finished 7th (2nd-9th tied) in the European Individual Chess Championship. In June 2026 in Batumi, Georgia Nadya finished 11th in the European Individual Chess Championship.

In August 2023, in Baku Nadya Toncheva participated in the single-elimination Women's Chess World Cup and lost in 1st round to IM Deimantė Cornette.

In July 2025, in Batumi Nadya Toncheva participated in the single-elimination Women's Chess World Cup and lost in 1st round to FM Anastasia Avramidou.

Nadya Toncheva played for Bulgaria in the Women's Chess Olympiad: in 2026 at the second board in the 46th Chess Olympiad (women) in Samarkand (+4, =2, -3).

In 2021, she was awarded the FIDE Master (FM) title and received the FIDE Woman International Master (WIM) title a year later. In 2024 Nadya Toncheva has obtained a title of Woman Grandmaster.
