= Teodora Injac =

Serbian chess player (born 2000)

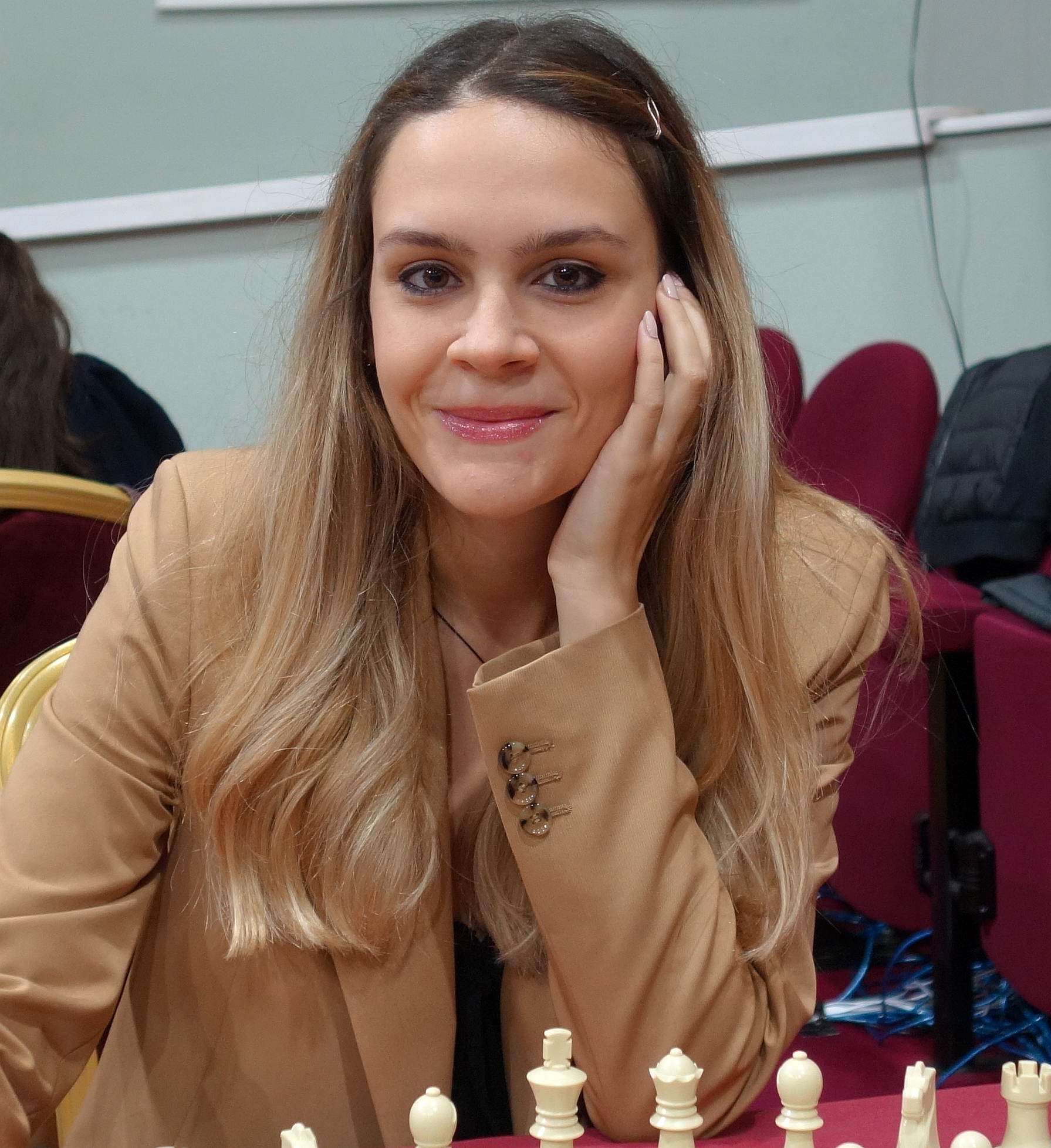
- Injac in 2023

Personal information
- Born: 26 May 2000 (age 26) Belgrade, Serbia, FR Yugoslavia

Chess career
- Country: Serbia
- Title: International Master (2023); Woman Grandmaster (2021)
- FIDE rating: 2430 (July 2026)
- Peak rating: 2474 (May 2025)

Teodora Injac (Serbian Cyrillic: Теодора Ињац; born 26 May 2000) is a Serbian chess player who holds the International Master (IM) title. She was awarded the Woman Grandmaster (WGM) title in 2021, and the IM title in 2023. In 2025 she became the female European champion.

== Chess career ==
She won the Women's Serbian Chess Championship in 2018, 2019 and 2020. She was the youngest ever to win the Women's Serbian Chess Championship.

She won bronze medal at the World Youth Chess Championship held in Porto Carras, Greece in 2018.

At the age of 17 she became a part of women's national team of Serbia and so far has represented Serbia in four European Teams Chess Championships (2017. in Hersonissos, Crete, 2019. in Batumi, Georgia, 2021. in Brezice, Slovenia, and 2023. in Budva, Montenegro)

At the European Teams Chess Championship in 2023. she took a gold medal for the best performance on the first board (7/9, RP:2596) which has earned her the first GM norm. She is the first-ever female chess player from Serbia to have achieved a GM norm.

She represented Serbia in the 2018 Chess Olympiad in Batumi Georgia and 2022 Chess Olympiad. in Chennai, India.

She qualified for the Women's Chess World Cup 2021 where, seeded 63rd, she defeated Dina Belenkaya 2-0 in the first round, before being defeated by 2nd-seed Kateryna Lagno 0.5-1.5 in the second round.

At the Women's Chess World Cup 2023 held in Baku, Azerbaijan, she defeated Nurai Sovetbekova 2-0 in the first round before defeating Sophie Milliet with the score of 1.5-0.5 in the second round. In the third round, she went on to defeat the Women's Chess World Cup 2021 winner and the former Women's World chess champion Alexandra Kosteniuk with the score of 3-1. In the fourth round, she was eliminated by Polina Shuvalova with the score of 0.5-1.5.

Injac won the 2025 European Women's Championship in Greece.
