= Assel Serikbay =

Kazakhstani chess player (born 2002)

Personal information
- Born: 23 January 2002 (age 24)

Chess career
- Country: Kazakhstan
- Title: Woman International Master (2019)
- Peak rating: 2340 (February 2020)

Assel Serikbay (Kazakh: Әсел Серікбай, Äsel Serikbay; born 23 January 2002) is a Kazakhstani chess Woman International Master (WIM) (2019).

== Chess career ==
Assel Serikbay twice in row won Kazakhstani Youth Chess Championships in girl's U18 age group (2019, 2020) with perfect result - 9 from 9. Also she won Kazakhstani Girls' Junior Chess Championship in U20 age group in 2021 and 2022.

In 2019, in Surakarta Assel Serikbay won Asian Girls' Junior Chess Championship in U20 age group. In 2022, she won silver medal in World Girls U-20 Championship.

In 2023 she won Central Asian Zonal Chess tournament and won the right to participate in the Women's Chess World Cup.

In 2023, in Baku Assel Serikbay participated in single-elimination Women's Chess World Cup and lost in 1st round to French Woman Grandmaster Pauline Guichard. In this same year she won silver medal in World Team Chess Championship with Kazakhstan team.

In 2019, she was awarded the FIDE Women International Master (WIM) title.
