= Kathiê Librelato =

Brazilian chess player (born 1998)

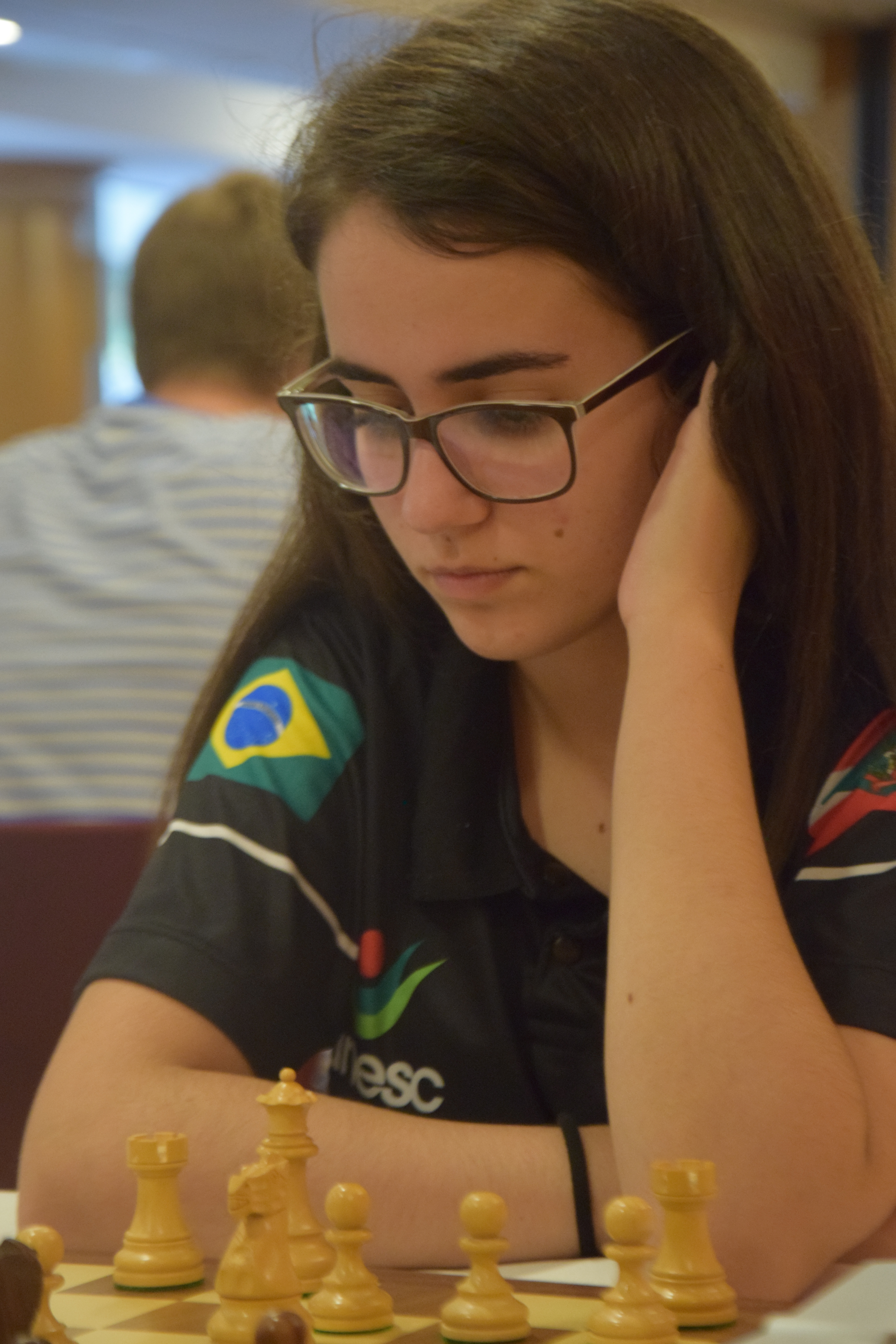
- Kathiê Librelato in July 2018

Personal information
- Born: July 27, 1998 (age 28) Içara, Santa Catarina, Brazil

Chess career
- Country: Brazil
- Title: Woman International Master (2018)
- Peak rating: 2260 (August 2022)

Kathiê Goulart Librelato (born 1998) is a Brazilian chess player. She was awarded the title of Woman International Master in 2018.

== Chess career ==
She has represented Brazil in the Chess Olympiad:

- In 2016, scoring 4½/8 on board four.
- In 2018, scoring 6½/10 on board three.
- In 2022, scoring 6½/11 on board two.
- In 2024, scoring 5/10 on board two.
- In 2026, scoring 7/11 on board four.

== See also ==
- List of female chess players
