= Alina Bivol =

Russian-Serbian chess player (born 1996)

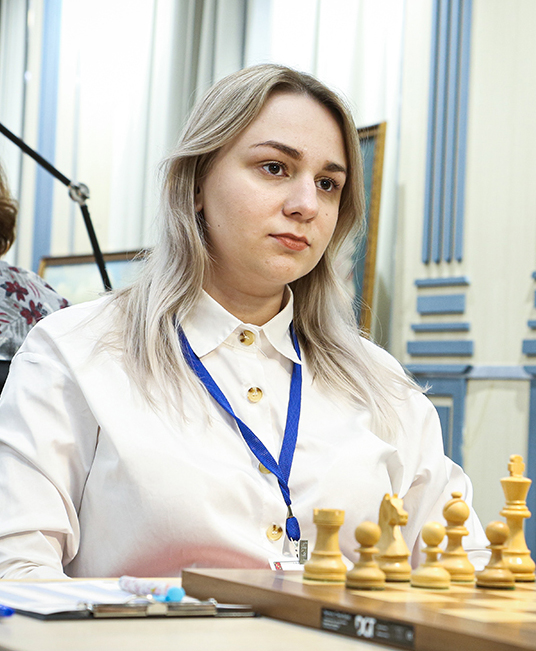
- Bivol at Russian Championship Superfinal 2021

Personal information
- Born: January 19, 1996 (age 30) Dmitrov, Russia

Chess career
- Country: Russia (until 2023); FIDE (2023–2026); Serbia (since 2026)
- Title: International Master (2021); Woman Grandmaster (2016)
- Peak rating: 2403 (September 2018)

Alina Bivol (born January 19, 1996) is a Russian chess player.

Bivol was granted the Woman International Master title in 2013. Her three norms were scoring 6 points out of 10 games in Kimry in 2009, 4.5/9 in Kostroma and 5/9 at the Chigorin Memorial in 2012.

In 2015, she won the Russian Under-21 Girls' Championship and finished second on tiebreak in the World Junior Championship, half a point behind Nataliya Buksa.
