= Mona Khaled =

Egyptian chess player (born 1994)

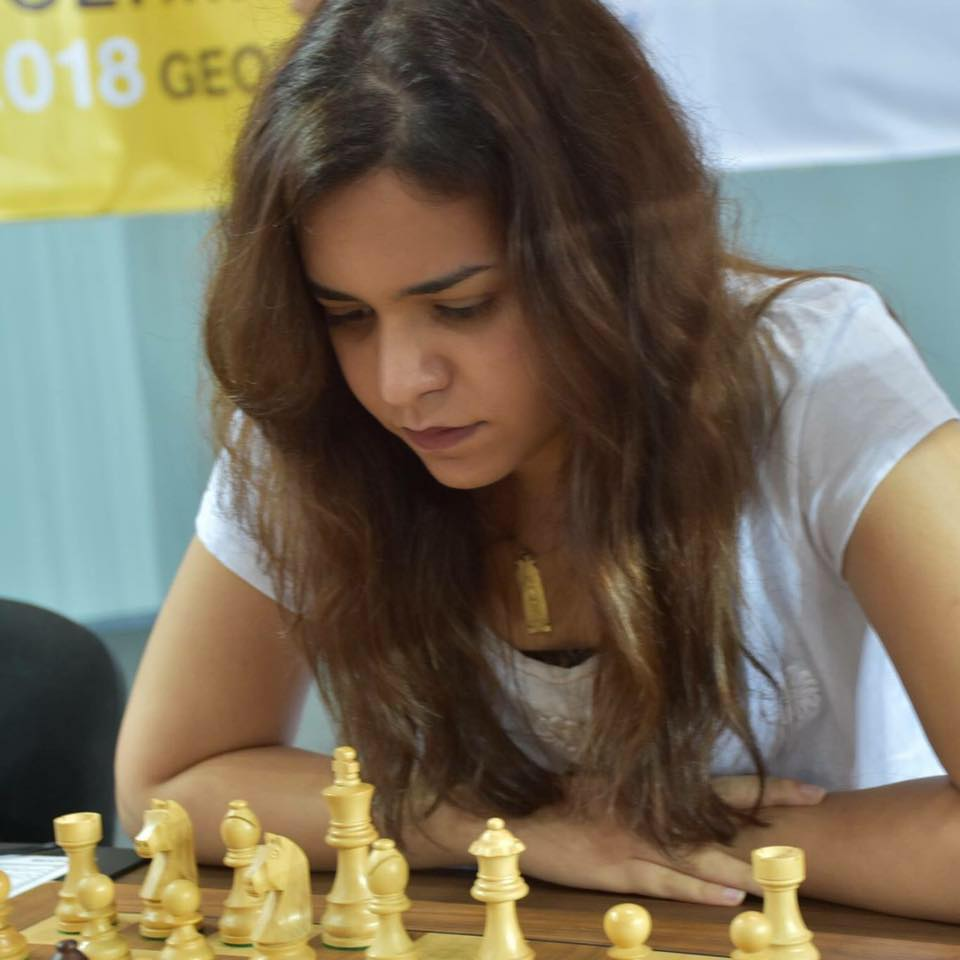
- Batumi Chess Olympiad

Personal information
- Born: 9 April 1994 (age 32)

Chess career
- Country: Egypt
- Title: Woman Grandmaster (2007)
- Peak rating: 2224 (November 2015)

Mona Khaled (born 9 April 1994) is an Egyptian chess player.

She is the first Egyptian and Arabic Player to achieve the Woman Grandmaster Title. Mona is the first and only girl to ever win the Egyptian Chess Championship in 2013. She has at times won the Women's African Chess Championship, the Women's Arab Chess Championship, the Mediterranean Women's Title and the Francophone Women's Title.

She represented Egypt in the Women's Chess Olympiad from 2008 to 2018; leading the Women's Egyptian Team on board 1 in Tromso Olympiad, the winner of Gold Medal of Category C.

She has competed in the Women's World Chess Championship from 2012 to 2017.
