= Mitra Asgharzadeh =

Iranian chess player (born 2002)

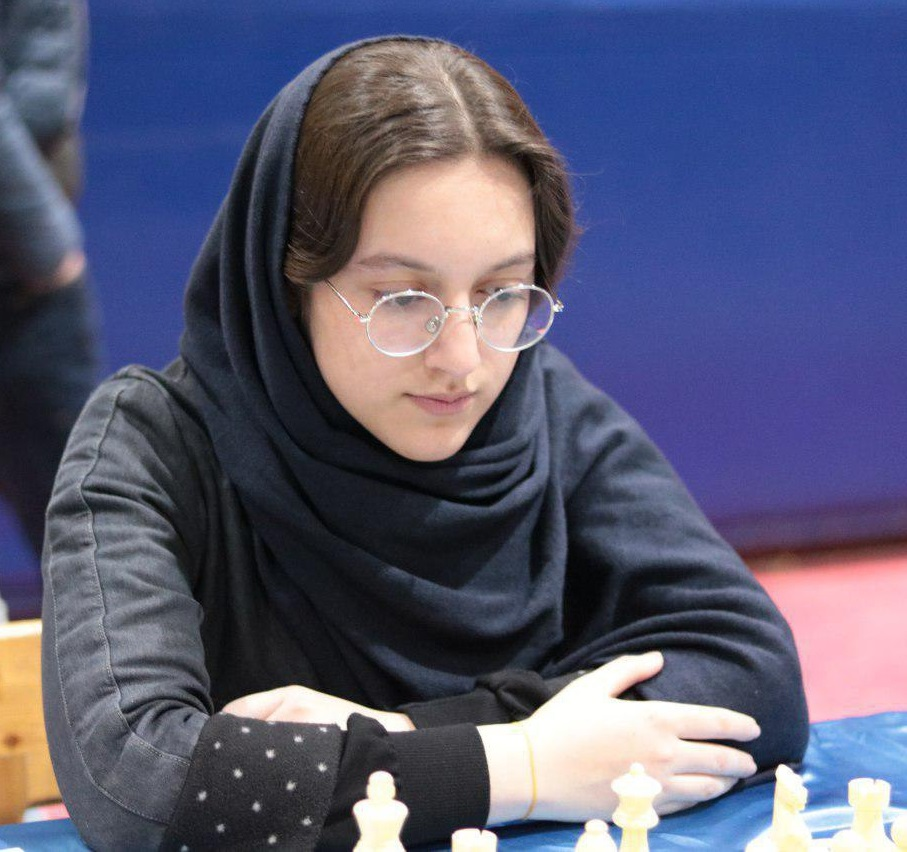

Personal information
- Born: 2002 (age 23–24) Shahriar

Chess career
- Country: Iran
- Title: Woman International Master (2023)
- FIDE rating: 2127 (َAugust 2019)
- Peak rating: 2207 (September 2019)

Mitra Asgharzadeh (Persian: میترا اصغرزاده; born in 2002) is an Iranian chess player who holds the title of Woman International Master (WIM), awarded by FIDE in 2023. She learned to play chess from her father during childhood and began pursuing the game competitively at the age of eleven.

== Chess career ==
Asgharzadeh emerged as one of Iran's leading junior female chess players after winning several national age-group championships. She won the Iranian Girls' Under-14 Championship in 2015, followed by the Asian School Chess Championship (Girls Under-17 Rapid) in 2016, where she also won the bronze medal in the standard event. She later captured the Iranian Girls' Under-18 Championship and the Iranian Girls' Under-20 Championship in 2019, having previously won the Under-20 title in 2018.

In 2021, Asgharzadeh won the Iranian Women's Chess Championship in Kermanshah, scoring 9 points from 11 rounds, earning selection to the Iranian women's national team. She won the Iranian Girls' Under-20 Championship again in 2022.

Her international breakthrough came in 2023 when she won the West Asian Zonal 3.1 Women's Championship, qualifying for the Women's Chess World Cup held in Baku. She competed in the World Cup, where she was eliminated in the first round by Polish Woman International Master Oliwia Kiołbasa. In the same year, she also finished third in the Iranian Women's Chess Championship and won the Asian Universities Chess Championship. Throughout her career, she has participated in a number of chess leagues, including the Turkish Chess Super League and other domestic and international leagues.

Asgharzadeh represented Iran at the 44th Chess Olympiad in Chennai, India, playing on the reserve board and helping the national team in the women's competition. In 2025, she finished as runner-up in the Iranian Women's Chess Championship, earning another selection to the Iranian national team.

== Achievements ==
- Runner-up, Iranian Women's Chess Championship (2026)

- Runner-up, Iranian Women's Chess Championship (2025)

- Winner, FIDE West Asia Zone 3.1 Women's Championship (2023), qualifying for the Women's Chess World Cup

- Third place, Iranian Women's Chess Championship (2023)

- Winner, Asian Universities Chess Championship

- Member of the Iranian national team at the 44th Chess Olympiad (Chennai, India)

- Winner, Iranian Girls' Under-20 Championship (2022)

- Winner, Iranian Women's Chess Championship (2021)

- Runner-up, West Asian Under-20 Girls Online Championship (2020)

- Winner, Iranian Girls' Under-20 Championship (2019)

- Winner, Iranian Girls' Under-18 Championship (2019)

- Winner, Iranian Women's National Festival (2019)

- Winner, Iranian Girls' Under-20 Championship (2018)

- Runner-up, Iranian Women's Chess Championship (2018)

- Runner-up, Iranian Women's National Festival (2017)

- Winner, Asian School Chess Championship (Rapid, Girls Under-17) (2016)

- Bronze medalist, Asian School Chess Championship (Girls Under-17) (2016)

- Winner, Iranian Girls' Under-14 Championship (2015)
