= Nurgyul Salimova =

Bulgarian chess player (born 2003)

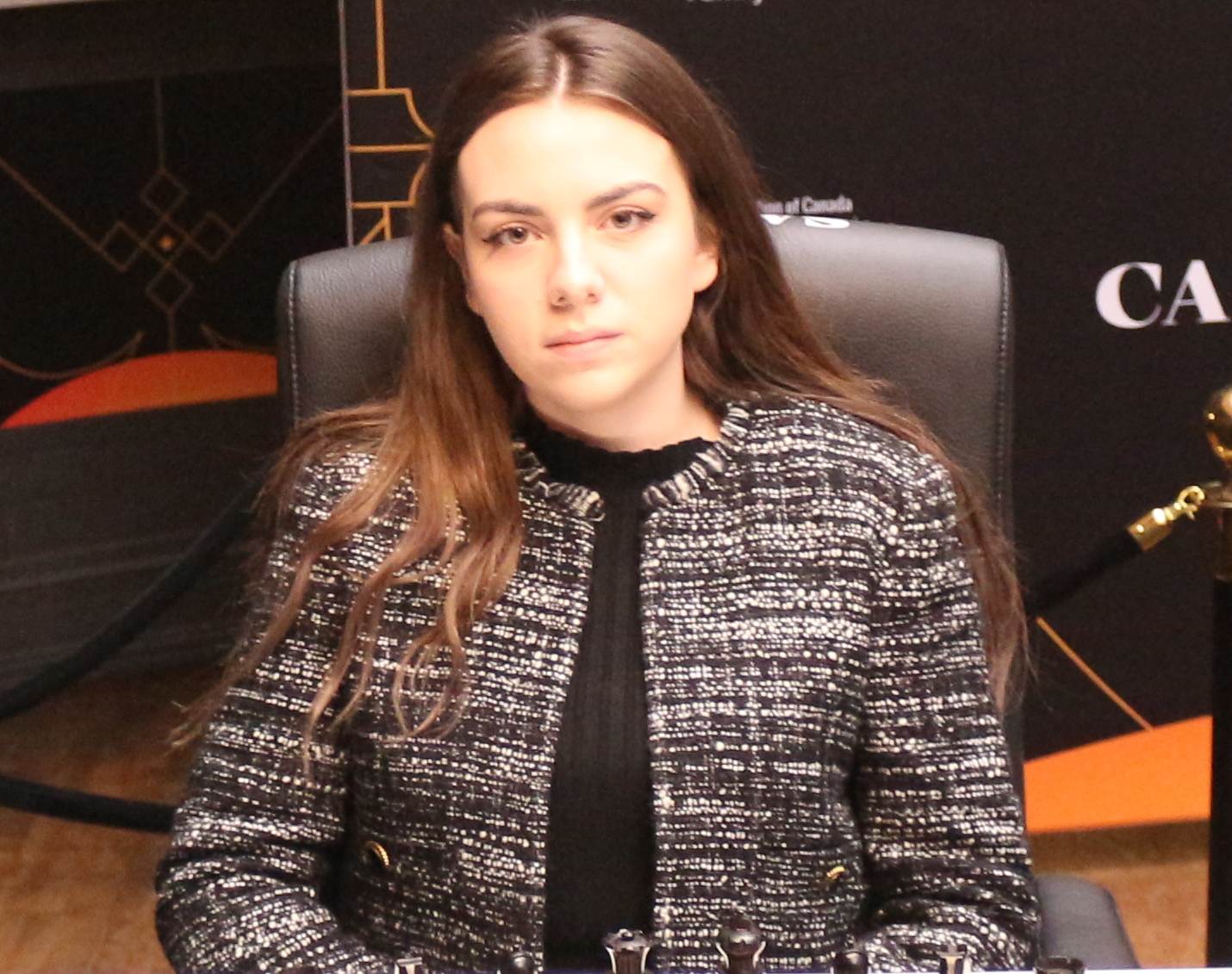
- Salimova at the 2024 Women's Candidates Tournament

Personal information
- Born: 2 June 2003 (age 23) Krepcha, Bulgaria

Chess career
- Country: Bulgaria
- Title: International Master (2019); Woman Grandmaster (2019)
- FIDE rating: 2416 (July 2026)
- Peak rating: 2449 (July 2024)

Nurgyul Salimova (Bulgarian: Нургюл Салимова; Turkish: Nurgül Salimova; born 2 June 2003) is a Bulgarian chess player. She was awarded the titles of International Master and Woman Grandmaster by FIDE in 2019. Salimova won the Bulgarian Women's Chess Championship in 2017. In 2023, she won the silver medal in Bulgarian Chess Championship, and was the only woman to compete in the open section.

== Early life ==
Salimova was born in the village of Krepcha, Targovishte Province. Both of her parents are of Turkish descent and she considers herself Turkish-Bulgarian. Her grandfather taught her how to play chess at the age of four.

== Chess career ==
In 2011, Salimova won the European Youth Chess Championship for girls under 8 in Albena. In 2015, she won the World Youth Chess Championship for girls under 12 in Porto Carras. In 2015, she won the European Youth Chess Championship for girls under 12. She is a multiple winner of Bulgarian and European Youth Chess Championships in fast and blitz chess for girls in different age groups.

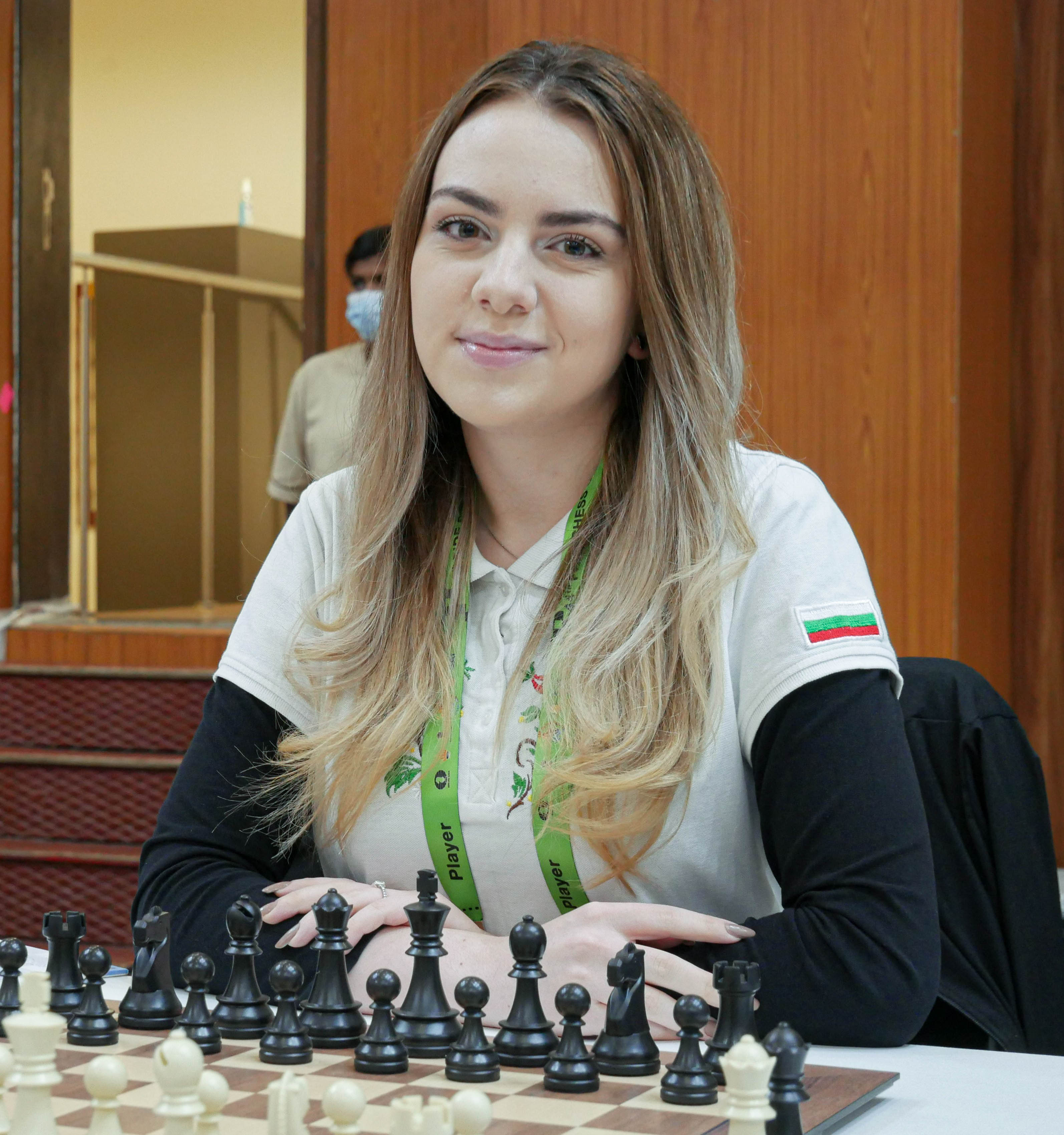
Salimova in Chennai, 2022

Salimova won the Bulgarian Women's Chess Championship in 2017, after which she was invited to play in the C group of the Tata Steel Chess Tournament. In April 2018, Salimova became the Bulgarian champion in section G16 and 2 days later, Bulgarian blitz champion in the boys' section under 16. In May 2018, she won the Open International d'Échecs de la Côte Basque in Bayonne, France, with a performance of 2600+, enough for a GM norm. In July 2018, Salimova scored her last WIM, first IM and first WGM norm in Pardubice, Czech Republic, with a performance of 2478. Her rating subsequently rose to 2352, she became number two among Bulgarian women and number two in the under-16 girls world ranking, as well as number eleven in the world list for girls under 20. In September 2018, she took part in the Serbian Women's League with the team of Banovci Dunav. Salimova played at the second board and scored 8/10 (without losses) with a performance of 2400+. This gave her a second WGM norm, but the team did poorly and finished in last place.

Salimova scored a WGM norm and a second IM norm in December 2018 at the age of 15 in Zadar, Croatia with a performance of 2492. In April 2019, at the European Women's Individual Chess Championship, Salimova scored her last (valid) WGM norm and became a WGM at the age of 15 years and 10 months. She also earned the right to participate in the Women's World Chess Championship.

In January 2022, Salimova got her first GM norm at Vergani Cup (January edition), after defeating the former world championship challenger GM Nigel Short. In the 2023 Bulgarian Chess Championships, she ended half a point short of first place. Although she tied for second place with two others (both GMs), Salimova was awarded the silver medal because her tiebreak points were higher. In the tournament, she finished ahead of six GMs and lost only to the champion, Kiril Georgiev.

In the Women's Chess World Cup 2023, she reached the final where she lost to 2nd-ranked Aleksandra Goryachkina. Ranked 29th in the event, she defeated Charlize van Zyl, Oliwia Kiołbasa, Mary Ann Gomes and Medina Warda Aulia, before upset wins over 12th-ranked Polina Shuvalova and 9th-ranked Anna Muzychuk took her to the final. As a result of reaching the final, Salimova qualified as one of the eight participants of the Women's Candidates Tournament 2024, held from 2 April to 25 April 2024 in Toronto, Canada and received her second GM norm.
