= Govhar Beydullayeva =

Azerbaijani chess player (born 2003)

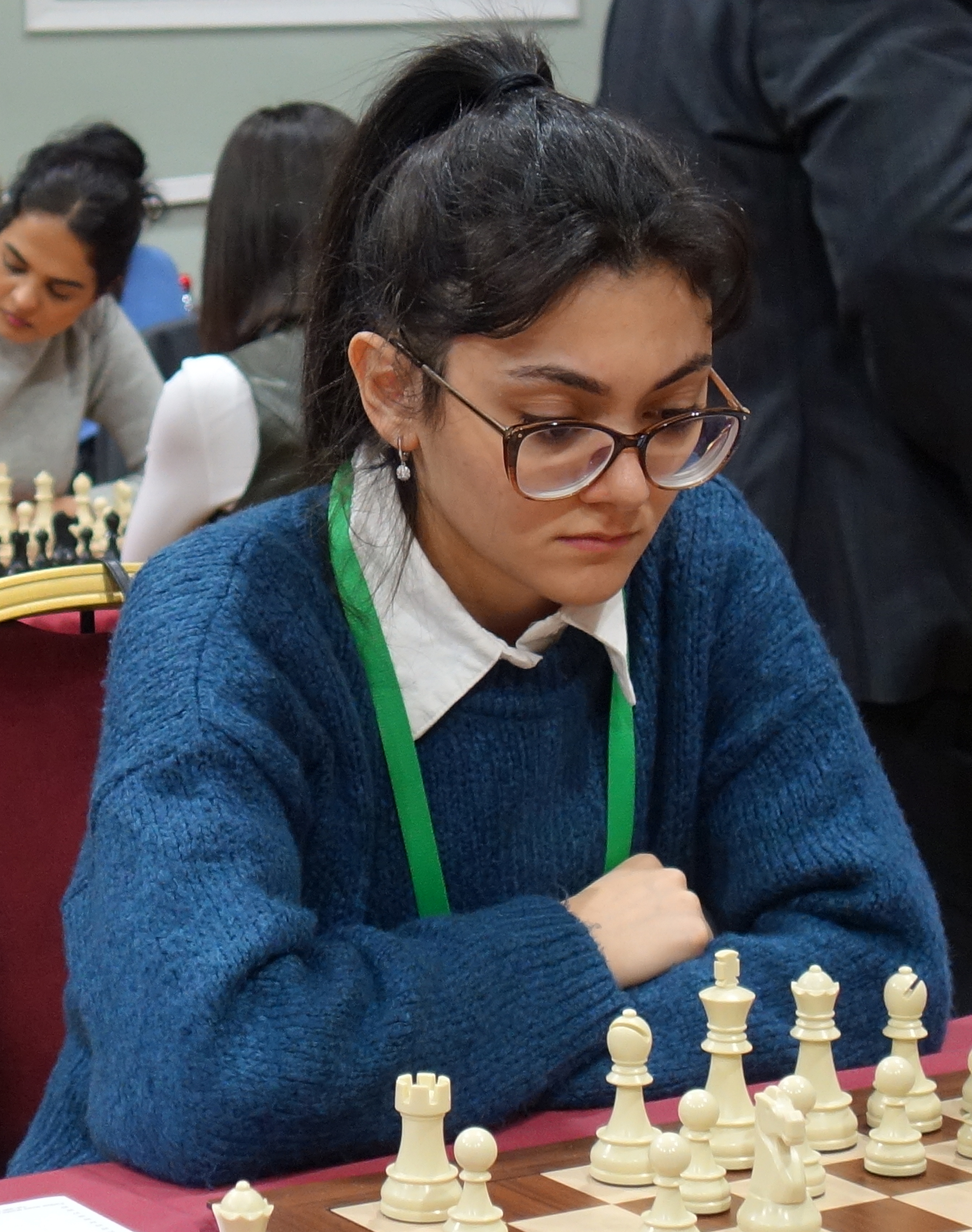

Personal information
- Born: April 23, 2003 (age 23) Al Zulfi, Saudi Arabia

Chess career
- Country: Azerbaijan
- Title: International Master (2026); Woman Grandmaster (2022)
- Peak rating: 2417 (June 2024)
- Peak ranking: No. 39 woman (June 2024)

Govhar Beydullayeva (Azerbaijani: Gövhər Bəydullayeva; born 23 April 2003) is an Azerbaijani chess Grandmaster (WGM 2022). She is the 2022 World Girls U-20 Champion as well as the World Girl's U18 Champion in 2021.

== Chess career ==
=== World and European championships ===
Govhar Beydullayeva repeatedly represented Azerbaijan at the European Youth Chess Championships and World Youth Chess Championships in different age groups, where she won three medals: gold medal (in 2017, at the European Youth Chess Championship in the U14 girls age group) and two silver medals (in 2014, at the European Youth Chess Championship in the U12 girls age group, and in 2015, at the European Youth Chess Championship in the U12 girls age group).

In 2013, Govhar Beydullayeva won European Youth Rapid Chess Championship in the U10 girls age group.

In August 2018, she ranked 4th in the European Youth Chess Championship in the U16 girls age group.

In 2021, she won the World Cup among girls under 18. In the same year she won Girls U18 Fide World Youth Super Final.

In April 2022, she won the gold medal for the woman with the best result at the 2022 European Individual Chess Championship.

In October 2022, she won Girls World Junior Chess Championship in Sardegna, Italia.

In 2023, Beydullayeva won 1st edition of World Junior Rapid Chess Championship. She took bronze medal in World Junior Blitz Chess Championship.

=== Team ===
In 2019, she played for gold medal winner national youth team of Azerbaijan in World Youth Chess Olympiad Under 16.

Govhar Beydullayeva is the member of Azerbaijan national women's team since 2021. She played for Azerbaijan-3 team in the Women's Chess Olympiad:

- In 2016, at third board in the 42nd Chess Olympiad (women) in Baku (+3, =6, −2).

She represented Azerbaijan at the European women's team chess championship in 2021 and 2023. Azerbaijan team won bronze medal in 2021 and silver in 2023.

In 2025, Azerbaijan national women’s team won silver medal in Women’s World Team Chess Championship which was held in Linares, Spain.

=== Azerbaijan Championships ===
In 2012, Govhar Beydullayeva won Azerbaijani Youth Chess Championship in the U10 girls age group, then she repeated this success for three more times in the years of 2013, 2015 and 2016

Govhar Beydullayeva repeatedly participated in Azerbaijan national women's chess championships, where she won 6 medals: two gold medals (in the years of 2022 and 2023), three silver medals (in the years of 2020, 2021 and 2025) and bronze (in 2019)

=== Other victories ===
In 2014, she played well in B category of "Baku Open 2014" festival. She scored 7 out of 9 and took 5th place. Also she gained 189 ELO points.

In 2017, with the score of 10 out of 10, Govhar Beydullayeva won the "Mikhail Botvinnik cup" which was held in Moscow Russia.

In 2021, she won silver medal among women in "Serbia Open Masters" tournament which was held in Belgrade, Serbia.

In July 2026, she won first place among women at the Trophée Dole 2026 International Chess Tournament and earned her third International Master norm, thereby obtaining the International Master (IM) title.
