= Ulviyya Fataliyeva =

Azerbaijani chess player (born 1996)

- Fataliyeva at the 2026 Chess Olympiad

Personal information
- Born: 3 August 1996 (age 30) Ganja, Azerbaijan

Chess career
- Country: Azerbaijan
- Title: International Master (2022); Woman Grandmaster (2017)
- FIDE rating: 2402 (September 2026)
- Peak rating: 2450 (April 2026)
- Peak ranking: No. 24 woman (April 2026)

Ulviyya Fataliyeva (Azerbaijani: Ülviyyə Fətəliyeva; born 3 August 1996) is an Azerbaijani chess player who holds the title of International Master. She won the European Women's Individual Chess Championship in 2024 and the Azerbaijan Women's Chess Championship in 2026.

== Biography ==
Ulviyya Fataliyeva attended Ganja chess school. She participated in the Azerbaijani Girls' Championships (U20) and won this tournament in 2011, at age 14. Also she participated in European Youth Chess Championships and World Youth Chess Championships. In 2010 in Batumi Ulviyya Fataliyeva won European Youth Chess Championship in Girls U14 age category. In 2014 she won European Youth Chess Championship in Girls U18 age category. In the same year she was awarded the FIDE Woman International Master (WIM) title and received the FIDE Woman Grandmaster (WGM) title three years later.

In 2017 she won silver medal in Azerbaijani Women Chess Championship (tournament won Gunay Mammadzada), and won silver medal for Azerbaijan chess club Odlar Yurdu in team competition and individual silver medal in 22nd European Chess Club Cup for Women.

Ulviyya Fataliyeva played for Azerbaijan in the 42nd Chess Olympiad (women) in Baku (2016), World Women's Team Chess Championship in Khanty-Mansiysk (2017), and two European Women's Team Chess Championships (2015, 2017). In 2018 she participated in the 43rd Chess Olympiad, where her team reached 10th place in the final rankings. In 2022 she received a silver medal at the 44th Chess Olympiad for her result on the reserve board; the team ended at 7th place. In 2024, at the 45th Chess Olympiad, Azerbaijan finished 15th, fataliyeva scored 6½/10 points (+5-2=3), 7th best for Board 2.

In August 2022, she won bronze medal in European Women's Individual Chess Championship.

In February 2026, Fataliyeva won the Azerbaijan's Women's Chess Championship.

In March 2026, Fataliyeva played in the masters section of International Women's Chess Championship Uzbekistan held in Bukhara, Uzbekistan, She won the tournament with 6½ points (+5-1=3), and gained 19 rating points, to reach her all time best.
