= Nataliya Buksa =

Ukrainian chess player (born 1996)

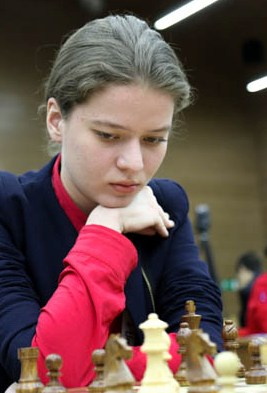
- Buksa in 2017

Personal information
- Born: Nataliya Ihorivna Buksa; November 6, 1996 (age 29) Lviv, Ukraine
- Spouse: Rauf Mamedov

Chess career
- Country: Ukraine
- Title: International Master (2018); Woman Grandmaster (2015)
- Peak rating: 2437 (September 2018)

Nataliya Ihorivna Buksa (Ukrainian: Наталія Ігорівна Букса; born November 6, 1996) is a Ukrainian chess player.

== Career ==
She won the Girls' World Junior Chess Championship in 2015. By doing so she became a Woman Grandmaster (WGM), and qualified for the Women's World Chess Championship 2017.

Nataliya Buksa won the Women's Ukrainian Chess Championship in 2018 in Kyiv.

In 2018, she was awarded the International Master (IM) title by FIDE.

She is ranked 5th best female player in Ukraine, and her highest rating was 2437 (in September 2018).

In 2022 at the 44th Chess Olympiad she was part of the Ukrainian team that won the women's tournament.

== Personal life ==
Buksa is married to Azerbaijani chess grandmaster Rauf Mamedov.
