= List of female chess players =

This article lists female chess players who have received FIDE (International Chess Federation) titles or have other significant achievements in chess.

== Grandmasters ==
There are 44 female players who have been awarded the title of Grandmaster, the highest lifetime title in chess, all of whom are living as of July 2025.

- Zhansaya Abdumalik (Kazakhstan)
- Ketevan Arakhamia-Grant (Scotland)
- Bibisara Assaubayeva (Kazakhstan)
- Nino Batsiashvili (Georgia)
- Maia Chiburdanidze (Georgia)
- Pia Cramling (Sweden)
- Viktorija Čmilytė (Lithuania)
- Elina Danielian (Armenia)
- Divya Deshmukh (India)
- Nana Dzagnidze (Georgia)
- Nona Gaprindashvili (Georgia)
- Olga Girya (Russia)
- Aleksandra Goryachkina (Russia)
- Valentina Gunina (Russia)
- Harika Dronavalli (India)
- Hoang Thanh Trang (Hungary)
- Hou Yifan (China)
- Ju Wenjun (China)
- Bela Khotenashvili (Georgia)
- Koneru Humpy (India)
- Nadezhda Kosintseva (Russia)
- Tatiana Kosintseva (Russia)
- Alexandra Kosteniuk (Switzerland)
- Irina Krush (United States)
- Kateryna Lagno (Russia)
- Lei Tingjie (China)
- Anna Muzychuk (Ukraine)
- Mariya Muzychuk (Ukraine)
- Elisabeth Pähtz (Germany)
- Peng Zhaoqin (Netherlands)
- Judit Polgár (Hungary)
- Susan Polgár (Hungary)
- Marie Sebag (France)
- Monika Soćko (Poland)
- Antoaneta Stefanova (Bulgaria)
- Tan Zhongyi (China)
- Anna Ushenina (Ukraine)
- Vaishali Rameshbabu (India)
- Xie Jun (China)
- Xu Yuhua (China)
- Zhao Xue (China)
- Zhu Chen (Qatar)
- Zhu Jiner (China)
- Natalia Zhukova (Ukraine)

== International Masters ==
As of August 2026, there are 153 women with the International Master (IM) title, including eight who are no longer living. (Deceased players noted by ^{†} symbol.)

- (United States) Tatev Abrahamyan
- (India) Vantika Agrawal
- (Spain) Olga Alexandrova
- (France) Silvia Alexieva
- (Russia) Karina Ambartsumova
- (Georgia (country)) Meri Arabidze
- (Turkey) Ekaterina Atalik
- (United States) Rose Atwell
- (Indonesia) Medina Warda Aulia
- (Austria) Olga Badelka
- (Azerbaijan) Khanim Balajayeva
- (India) Savitha Shri Baskar
- (Mongolia) Batchimeg Tuvshintugs
- (Australia) Irina Berezina
- (Serbia) Alina Bivol
- (Russia) Anastasia Bodnaruk
- (Serbia) Nataša Bojković
- (Israel) Angela Borsuk
- (Italy) Marina Brunello
- (Ukraine) Nataliya Buksa
- (Romania) Irina Bulmaga
- (Soviet Union) Elisaveta Bykova^{†}
- (Panama) Ashley Castillo
- (Russia) Daria Charochkina
- (England) Dagnė Čiukšytė
- (Peru) Deysi Cori
- (Poland) Karina Cyfka
- (France) Deimantė Daulyte-Cornette
- (Greece) Yelena Dembo
- (United States) Dorsa Derakhshani
- (Poland) Joanna Dworakowska^{†}
- (Israel) Marsel Efroimski
- (Azerbaijan) Ulviyya Fataliyeva
- (Ecuador) Martha Fierro Baquero
- (Romania) Cristina Foișor^{†}
- (Hungary) Zsóka Gaál
- (Russia) Alisa Galliamova
- (Armenia) Lilit Galojan
- (Ukraine) Inna Gaponenko
- (Hungary) Anita Gara
- (Spain) Marta García Martín
- (Russia) Leya Garifullina
- (United States) Rusudan Goletiani
- (France) Pauline Guichard
- (China) Guo Qi
- (Georgia (country)) Sopiko Guramishvili
- (Georgia (country)) Nino Gurieli
- (Russia) Marina Guseva
- (Georgia (country)) Sopio Gvetadze
- (Slovakia) Zuzana Hagarová
- (England) Jovanka Houska
- (England) Harriet Hunt
- (Serbia) Teodora Injac
- (Georgia (country)) Nana Ioseliani
- (Czech Republic) Jana Jacková
- (Georgia (country)) Lela Javakhishvili
- (Germany) Ketino Kachiani-Gersinska
- (Kazakhstan) Meruert Kamalidenova
- (India) Eesha Karavade
- (Poland) Alina Kashlinskaya
- (Spain) Sarasadat Khademalsharieh
- (Georgia (country)) Sopiko Khukhashvili
- (Georgia (country)) Nino Khurtsidze^{†}
- (Poland) Oliwia Kiołbasa
- (Israel) Masha Klinova
- (Ukraine) Tatiana Kononenko
- (Russia) Ekaterina Korbut
- (Ukraine) Liubov Kostiukova
- (Russia) Ekaterina Kovalevskaya
- (India) Bhakti Kulkarni
- (Poland) Klaudia Kulon
- (Romania) Alina l'Ami
- (England) Susan K. Lalic
- (Netherlands) Tea Lanchava
- (United States) Alice Lee
- (China) Li Ruofan
- (Georgia (country)) Maia Lomineishvili
- (China) Lu Miaoyi
- (Argentina) Carolina Luján
- (Hungary) Ildikó Mádl
- (Poland) Aleksandra Maltsevskaya
- (Azerbaijan) Gulnar Mammadova
- (Azerbaijan) Gunay Mammadzada
- (Serbia) Alisa Marić
- (Russia) Iulia Mashinskaya
- (Spain) Ana Matnadze
- (Russia) Svetlana Matveeva
- (Hungary) Nóra Medvegy
- (Georgia (country)) Salome Melia
- (France) Sophie Milliet
- (Armenia) Lilit Mkrtchian
- (India) Nisha Mohota
- (Austria) Eva Moser^{†}
- (Mongolia) Batkhuyag Munguntuul
- (Kazakhstan) Guliskhan Nakhbayeva
- (Estonia) Mai Narva
- (Hungary) Nomin-Erdene Davaademberel
- (Kazakhstan) Alua Nurman
- (Cuba) Lisandra Teresa Ordaz Valdés
- (Ukraine) Yuliia Osmak
- (Russia) Evgenija Ovod
- (United States) Nazí Paikidze
- (Germany) Sarah Papp
- (Romania) Corina Peptan
- (Moldova) Svetlana Petrenko
- (Vietnam) Phạm Lê Thảo Nguyên
- (Hungary) Sofia Polgar
- (Georgia (country)) Maka Purtseladze
- (Poland) Iweta Rajlich
- (Latvia) Olita Rause
- (Slovakia) Eva Repková
- (Colombia) Paula Andrea Rodriguez Rueda
- (Netherlands) Eline Roebers
- (India) Padmini Rout
- (Russia) Olga Rubtsova^{†}
- (Soviet Union) Lyudmila Rudenko^{†}
- (Hungary) Anna Rudolf
- (India) Tania Sachdev
- (Kazakhstan) Dinara Saduakassova
- (Bulgaria) Nurgyul Salimova
- (Venezuela) Sarai Sanchez Castillo
- (United States) Anna Sargsyan
- (Russia) Anastasia Savina
- (Germany) Zoya Schleining
- (Italy) Elena Sedina
- (China) Shen Yang
- (Russia) Anna Shukhman
- (Russia) Polina Shuvalova
- (Israel) Yuliya Shvayger
- (France) Almira Skripchenko
- (China) Song Yuxin
- (India) Soumya Swaminathan
- (Indonesia) Irene Kharisma Sukandar
- (Russia) Elena Tairova^{†}
- (Uzbekistan) Gulrukhbegim Tokhirjonova
- (Greece) Stavroula Tsolakidou
- (Russia) Irina Turova
- (Slovenia) Laura Unuk
- (Hungary) Szidonia Vajda
- (Russia) Irina Vasilevich
- (Ukraine) Tatjana Vasilevich
- (Spain) Sabrina Vega Gutiérrez
- (Bulgaria) Iva Videnova
- (India) Subbaraman Vijayalakshmi
- (Germany) Dinara Wagner
- (United States) Annie Wang
- (China) Wang Yu
- (United States) Carissa Yip
- (Russia) Elena Zaiatz
- (United States) Anna Zatonskih
- (Belarus) Nastassia Ziaziulkina
- (Italy) Olga Zimina
- (Belgium) Anna Zozulia

== Alphabetical list ==
This list of female chess players includes people who are primarily known as chess players and have an article on the English Wikipedia. It includes the preceding lists of Grandmasters and International Masters.

FIDE title abbreviations:

- GM – grandmaster
- IM – International Master
- FM – FIDE Master
- WGM – Woman Grandmaster
- WIM – Woman International Master
- WFM – Woman FIDE Master
- WCM – Woman Candidate Master

== A ==
- Abdumalik, Zhansaya (2000) Kazakhstan – GM
- Afonasieva, Anna (2001) Russia – WIM
- Aginian, Nelly (1981) Armenia – WGM
- Agrawal, Vantika (2002) India – IM
- Yamama Asif Abdula Al Fayyadh (2001) Iraq – WCM
- Allahverdiyeva, Ayan (2005) Azerbaijan – WFM
- Akhsharumova, Anna (1957) Russia, USA – WGM
- Julia Alboredo (1997) Brazil – WIM
- Alekhine, Grace (1876–1956) USA, United Kingdom, France
- Alexandria, Nana (1949) Georgia – WGM
- An Yangfeng (1963) China – WIM
- Andriasian, Siranush (1986) Armenia – WIM
- Arakhamia, Ketevan (1968) Georgia, Scotland – GM
- Assaubayeva, Bibisara (2004) Kazakhstan – GM
- Atalik, Ekaterina (1982) Russia, Turkey – WGM and IM

== B ==
- Badenhorst, Chloe (2007) South Africa – WFM
- Bain, Mary (1904–1972) USA – WIM
- Balajayeva, Khanim (2001) Azerbaijan – IM
- Belakovskaia, Anjelina (1969) Ukraine, USA – WGM
- Belavenets, Liudmila (1940) Russia – ICCF Women's World Champion, WIM
- Belenkaya, Dina (1993) Russia – WGM
- Bellin, Jana (1947) Czech, England – WGM
- Benedict, Clare (1871–1961) USA, Switzerland
- Benini, Clarice (1905–1976) Italy – WIM
- Benmesbah, Natacha (1989) France – WIM
- Benschop, Anne Marie (1969) Netherlands – WIM
- Berend, Elvira (1965) Kazakhstan/Luxembourg – WGM
- Berezina, Irina (1965) Australia – IM
- Beskow, Katarina (1867–1939) Sweden
- Bhakti Kulkarni (1992) India – WGM
- Bijoux, Caroline (1976) South Africa
- Bivol, Alina (1996) Russia – IM
- Borisova, Borislava (1951) Sweden/Bulgaria – WIM
- Bos-Swiecik, Iwona (1958) Netherlands – WIM
- Botez, Alexandra (1995) Canada – WFM
- Botsari, Anna-Maria (1972) Greece – WGM
- Bruinenberg, Carla (1944) Netherlands – WFM
- Brustman, Agnieszka (1962) Poland – WGM
- Burtman, Sharon Ellen (1968) USA – WIM
- Bykova, Elisabeth (1913–1989) Russia – Women's World Champion, WGM

== C ==
- Çaku, Kler (2010) Albania
- Caoili, Arianne (1986–2020) Australia – WIM
- Cardoso, Ruth (1934–2000) Brazil – WIM
- Carrasco, Berna (1914–2013) Chile – WIM
- Carvalho, Lígia Maria de Abreu (1957–1993) Brazil
- Caxita, Esperança (1999) Angola – WIM
- Chaudé de Silans, Chantal (1919–2004) France – WIM
- Chaves, Joara (1962) Brazil – WIM
- Chaves, Jussara (1959) Brazil – WIM
- Chelushkina, Irina (1961) Serbia – WGM
- Chiburdanidze, Maia (1961) Georgia – Women's World Champion, GM 1984
- Čiukšytė, Dagnė Č (1977) Lithuania, England – WGM and IM
- Çınar Çorlulu, Nilüfer (1962) Turkey – WIM
- Corke, Anya (1990) Hong Kong, England – WGM
- Čmilytė, Viktorija (1983) Lithuania – GM
- Cramling Bellon, Anna (2002) Sweden – WFM
- Cramling, Pia (1963) Sweden – GM 1992

== D ==
- Dekic, Biljana (1950) Australia – WIM
- Dembo, Yelena (1983) Russia, Israel, Hungary, Greece – WGM and IM
- Deshmukh, Divya (2005) India – GM
- Ding Yixin (1991) China – WGM
- Donaldson, Elena (1957–2012) Russia, Georgia, USA – WGM
- Drastik, Penelope (1997) Australia
- Drewes, Mariëtte (1967) Netherlands – WFM
- Dzagnidze, Nana (1987) Georgia – GM 2008

== E ==
- Edzgveradze, Natalia (1975) Georgia – WGM
- Eidelson, Rakhil (1958) Belarus – WGM
- Ereńska, Hanna (1946) Poland – WGM
- Eretová, Květa (1926) Czechoslovakia – WGM

== F ==
- Fagan, Louisa Matilda (1850–1931) Italy, UK
- Miss Fatima India, United Kingdom
- February, Jesse (1997) South Africa – WIM
- Feliciano, Vanessa (1990) Brazil – WIM
- Fierro, Martha (1977) Ecuador – WGM and IM
- Fischdick, Gisela (1955) Germany – WGM
- Fisher, Michelle (1997) South Africa – WFM
- Flear, Christine (1967) France – WIM
- Cristina Adela Foișor (1967–2017) Romania – WGM and IM
- Forbes, Cathy (1968) England – WIM
- Francisco, Candela (2006) Argentina – WFM
- Frayna, Janelle Mae (1996) Philippines – WGM
- Frick, Denise (1980) South Africa – WIM
- Fronda, Jan Jodilyn (1994) Philippines - WIM

== G ==
- Galliamova, Alisa (1972) Russia – WGM and IM
- Gaprindashvili, Nona (1941) Georgia – Women's World Champion, GM 1978
- Gajcin, Marina (2001) Serbia – WGM
- Gara, Anita (1983) Hungary – WGM and IM
- Gara, Ticia (1984) Hungary – WGM
- Leya Garifullina (2004) Russia – WGM and IM
- Gerlecka, Regina (1913–1983) Poland
- Gilbert, Ellen (1837–1900) USA
- Gilchrist, Mary (c.1882–1947) Scotland
- Girya, Olga (1991) Russia – GM
- Golubenko, Valentina (1990) Estonia, Croatia – WGM
- Javiera Belén Gómez Barrera (2002) Chile – WIM
- Gong Qianyun (1985) China – WGM
- Goryachkina, Aleksandra (1998) Russia – GM
- Graf, Sonja (1908–1965) Germany, Argentina, USA – WIM
- Greeff, Melissa (1994) South Africa – WGM
- Gresser, Gisela (1906–2000) USA – WIM
- Guggenberger, Ilse (1942) Colombia – WIM
- Gunina, Valentina (1989) Russia – GM 2013
- Guo, Emma (1995) Australia – WIM
- Guo Qi (1995) China – IM
- Guramishvili, Sopiko (1991) Georgia – WGM and IM

== H ==
- Hamid, Rani (1944) Bangladesh – WIM
- Harika, Dronavalli (1991) India – GM
- Harmsen, Jessica (1966) Netherlands – WIM
- Harum, Gisela (1903–1995) Austria
- Heemskerk, Fenny (1919–2007) The Netherlands – WGM
- Herman, Róża (1902–1995) Poland – WIM
- Hoang, Thanh Trang (1980) Vietnam, Hungary – GM 2007
- Holloway, Edith (1868–1956) England – WIM
- Hołuj-Radzikowska, Krystyna (1931–2006) Poland – WGM
- Hou Yifan (1994) China – GM 2008
- Houska, Jovanka (1980) England – WGM and IM
- Huang Qian (1986) China – WGM
- Hunt, Harriet (1978) England – WGM and IM

== I ==
- Injac, Teodora (2000) Serbia – WGM
- Ioseliani, Nana (1962) Georgia – WGM and IM

== J ==
- Jacková, Jana (1982) Czech Republic – WGM and IM
- Jackson Sheila (1957) England – WGM
- Jannatul, Ferdous (2005) Bangladesh – WCM
- Johansson, Viktoria (1974) Sweden – WIM
- Jose Campos, Maria (1999) Argentina – WIM
- Ju Wenjun (1991) China – GM

== K ==
- Kairbekova, Amina (2006) Kazakhstan – WIM
- Kaliakhmet, Elnaz (2010) Kazakhstan – WIM
- Karavade, Eesha (1987) India – WGM and IM
- Karff, Mona (1914–1998) Bessarabia (Moldova), Palestine, USA – WIM
- Kazarian, Anna-Maja (2000) Netherlands – WIM and FM
- Keller-Herrmann, Edith (1921–2010) Germany – WGM
- Khoudgarian, Natalia (1975) Russia, Canada – WIM
- Khurtsidze, Nino (1975–2018) Georgia – WGM and IM
- Kiołbasa, Oliwia (2000) Poland – WIM
- Kirtadze, Anastasia (2001) Georgia – WFM
- Kļaviņa, Ilga (1941) Latvia
- Klovāne, Astra (1944) Latvia
- Konarkowska-Sokolov, Henrijeta (1938) Poland, Serbia – WGM
- Koneru, Humpy (1987) India – GM 2002
- Korbut, Ekaterina (1985) Russia – WGM and IM
- Kosintseva, Nadezhda (1985) Russia – WGM and IM
- Kosintseva, Tatiana (1986) Russia – WGM and IM
- Kosteniuk, Alexandra (1984) Russia – Women's World Champion, GM 2004
- Kouwenhoven, Marisca (1976) Netherlands – WFM
- Kostiuk, Tatiana (1982) Ukraine – WGM
- Kozlovskaya, Valentina (1938) Russia – WGM
- Kristol, Ljuba (1944) Russia, Israel – ICCF Women's World Champion
- Krush, Irina (1983) Ukraine, USA – GM (2013)
- Kubicka, Anna (1999) Poland – WIM
- Kursova, Maria (1986) Armenia – WGM
- Kushnir, Alla (1941–2013) Russia, Israel – WGM

== L ==
- Lahno, Kateryna (1989) Ukraine, Russia – GM 2007
- Latreche, Sabrina (1993) Algeria – WIM
- Lane, Lisa (1933–2024) USA – WIM
- L'Ami, Alina (1985) Romania – IM
- Larsen, Ingrid (1909–1990) Denmark – WIM
- Lauberte, Milda (1918–2009) Latvia – WIM
- Lazarević, Milunka (1932–2018) Serbia – WGM
- Lei Tingjie (1997) China – GM
- Leite, Catarina(1983) Portugal – WIM
- Levitina, Irina (1954) Russia, USA – WGM
- Li Ruofan (1997) China – IM
- Librelato, Kathiê (1998) Brazil – WIM
- Limbach, Renate (1971–2006) Netherlands – WIM
- Lin Ye (1974) China – WFM
- Litinskaya-Shul, Marta (1949) Ukraine – WGM
- Liu Shilan (1962) China – WGM
- Lu Xiaosha (1973) China – WIM

== M ==
- Macalda di Scaletta (c. 1240–c. 1310) Kingdom of Sicily
- Mádl, Ildikó (1969) Hungary – WGM and IM
- Majdan, Joanna (1988) Poland – WGM
- Zara Majid (2010) Cayman Islands – WCM
- Maltsevskaya, Aleksandra (2002) Russia – WGM and IM
- Marić, Alisa (1970) USA, Serbia – WGM and IM
- Marić, Mirjana (1970) Serbia – WGM
- Marinello, Beatriz (1964) Chile – WIM
- Matveeva, Svetlana (1969) Russia – WGM and IM
- Menchik, Olga (1908–1944) Czechoslovakia, England
- Menchik, Vera (1906–1944) Czechoslovakia, England – Women's World Champion
- Meyer, Marany (1984) South Africa/New Zealand – WIM
- Michell, Edith (1872–1951) England
- Milliet, Sophie (1983) France – WGM and IM
- Mišanović, Vesna (1964) Bosnia and Herzegovina – WGM
- Mkrtchian, Lilit (1982) Armenia – WGM and IM
- Mora, María Teresa (1902–1980) Cuba – WIM
- Muminova, Nafisa (1990) Uzbekistan – WGM
- Puteri Munajjah Az-Zahraa Azhar (2001) Malaysia – WIM
- Mungunzul, Bat-Erdene (2005) Mongolia – WCM
- Mutesi, Phiona (1993) Uganda – WCM
- Muzychuk, Anna (1990) Ukraine, Slovenia – WGM and IM

== N ==
- Nagrocka, Ewa (1949-2015) Poland, Germany – WFM
- Nakhbayeva, Guliskhan (1991) Kazakhstan – IM
- Nakhimovskaya, Zara (1931) Israel
- Nandhidhaa, Pallathur Venkatachalam (1996) India - WGM
- Nassr, Lina (2003) Algeria – WIM
- Narva, Mai (1999) Estonia – IM
- Nebolsina, Vera (1989) Russia – WGM
- Ning Chunhong (1968) China – WGM
- Nurmanova, Alua (2007) Kazakhstan – WIM
- Nyberg, Christina (1962) Sweden

== O ==
- Omonova, Umida (2006) Uzbekistan – WIM
- Ortiz, Nadya (2010) Colombia – WGM
- Ortiz Verdezoto, Anahí (2001) Ecuador – WIM
- Ovezdurdiyeva, Jemal (1998) Turkmenistan – WFM
- Öztürk, Kübra (1991) Turkey – WGM

== P ==
- Pähtz, Elisabeth (1985) Germany – WGM and GM
- Paridar, Shadi (1986) Iran – WGM
- Peng, Zhaoqin (1968) China, Netherlands – GM 2004
- Pertlová, Soňa (1988–2011) Czech Republic – WIM
- Piatigorsky, Jacqueline (1911–2012) France, USA
- Pogonina, Natalia (1985) Russia – WGM and IM
- Pokorná, Regina (1982) Austria – WGM
- Polgár, Judit (1976) Hungary – GM 1991
- Polgár, Sófia (1974) Hungary, Israel – WGM and IM
- Polgar, Susan (1969) Hungary, USA – Women's World champion, GM 1991
- Polihroniade, Elisabeta (1935–2016) Romania – WGM
- Pourkashiyan, Atousa (1988) Iran – WGM
- Priyanka K (2001) India – WIM
- Price, Edith Charlotte (1872–1956) England
- Ptáčníková, Lenka (1976) Czech Republic, Iceland – WGM
- Pujari, Rucha (1994) India – WIM

== Q ==
- Qin Kanying (1974) China – WGM
- Qiyu Zhou (2000) Canada – WGM

== R ==
- Radeva, Viktoria (2001) Bulgaria – WGM
- Rajlich, Iweta (1981) Poland – WGM and IM
- Ranasinghe, Sachini (1994) Sri Lanka – WIM
- Ratcu, Tatiana (1979) Brazil – WIM
- Regan, Natasha (1971) England – WIM
- Reischer, Salome (1899–1980) Austria – WIM
- Reizniece-Ozola, Dana (1981) Latvia – WGM
- Ribeiro, Regina Lúcia (1961) Brazil – WIM
- Riegler, Alessandra (1961) Italy – ICCF Women's World Champion
- Rinder, Friedl (1905–2001) Germany – WIM
- Rogule, Laura (1988) Latvia – WGM
- Roodzant, Catharina (1896–1999) The Netherlands
- Roos, Nancy (1905–1957) United States
- Rootare, Salme (1913–1987) Estonia – WIM
- Ross, Laura (1988) United States – WFM
- Ruan Lufei (1987) China – WGM
- Rubene, Ilze (1958–2002) – WIM
- Rubtsova, Olga (1909–1992) Russia – Women's World Champion and IFCC Women's World Champion, WGM
- Rudenko, Lyudmila (1904–1986) Ukraine, Russia – Women's World Champion, WGM and IM, first woman awarded the International Master title
- Rudge, Mary (1842–1919) England
- Rudolf, Anna (1987) Hungary – WGM and IM

== S ==
- Sabure, Taduetso (1982) Botswana – WGM
- Sachdev, Tania (1986) India – IM and WGM
- Šafranska, Anda (1960) Latvia, France – WGM
- Salimova, Nurgyul (2003) Bulgaria – WGM and IM
- Sargsyan, Anna M. (2001) (Armenia) – IM
- Schwartzmann, Paulette (1910–19??) Latvia, France, Argentina
- Schneider, Jana (2002) Germany – FM
- Schneider, Veronika (1987) Hungary – WGM
- Schut, Lisa (1994) Netherlands – WIM
- Sebag, Marie (1986) France – GM 2008
- Selkirk, Rebecca (1993) South Africa – WCM
- Semenova, Irina (1990) Uzbekistan – WIM
- Semenova, Lidia (1951) Ukraine – WGM
- Shahade, Jennifer (1980) USA – WGM
- Sheldon, Ruth (1980) England – WIM
- Shen Yang (1989) China – IM
- Shuvalova, Polina (2001) Russia – IM and WGM
- Sieber, Fiona (2000) Germany – WIM
- Skripchenko, Almira (1976) Moldova, France – WGM and IM
- Slavotinek, Anne (1963) Australia – WIM
- Soćko, Monika (1978) Poland – GM 2008
- Solomons, Anzel (1978) South Africa – WIM
- Srebrnič, Ana (1984) Slovenia – WGM
- Starr, Nava (1949) Latvia, Canada – WIM
- Stefanova, Antoaneta (1979) Bulgaria – Women's World Champion, GM 2003
- Stevenson, Agnes (1873–1935) England
- Stock, Lara (1992) Germany, Croatia WGM
- Styazhkina, Anna (1997) Russia – WIM
- Sukhareva, Olga (1984) Russia – ICCF Women's World Champion
- Sultana Shirin, Sharmin (1989) Bangladesh – WIM
- Sun Fanghui (1993) China – WIM

== T ==
- Tairova, Elena (1991–2010) Russia – WGM and IM
- Tan Zhongyi (1991) China – GM
- Tian Tian (1983) China – WGM
- Toma, Katarzyna (1985) Poland, England – WGM
- Toncheva, Nadya (2005) Bulgaria – WIM
- Tonini, Alice Italy
- Topel, Zehra (1987) Turkey – WIM
- Tranmer, Eileen (1910–1983) England – WIM
- Tsodikova, Natalia (1969) US – WFM
- Tuvshintugs, Batchimeg (1986) Mongolia – WGM
- Tsatsalashvili, Keti (1992) Georgia – WGM

== U ==
- Urh, Zala (2002) Slovenia – WGM 2025
- Ushenina, Anna (1985) Ukraine – GM 2012

== V ==
- Vaishali Rameshbabu (2001) India – IM
- Vajda, Szidonia (1979) Romania, Hungary – WGM and IM
- Van Arkel-de Greef, Heleen Netherlands (1965) – WIM
- van der Merwe, Cecile (1987) South Africa – WIM
- van Parreren, Hanneke Netherlands (1953) – WFM
- van Zyl, Charlize (1999) South Africa – WIM
- Varela La Madrid, Tilsia Carolina (1994) Venezuela – WIM
- Vargas, Gabriela (1988) Paraguay – WIM
- Verőci, Zsuzsa (1949) Hungary – WGM
- Volpert, Larissa (1926–2017) Russia – WGM
- Vozovic, Oksana (1985) Ukraine – WGM

== W ==
- Shahenda Wafa (1998) Egypt – WGM
- Shrook Wafa (1997) Egypt – WGM
- Annie Wang (2002) United States – IM
- Wang Jue (1995) China – WGM
- Wang Lei (1975) China – WGM
- Wang Pin (1974) China – WGM
- Wang Yu (1982) China – IM
- Hannah Wilson (2009) Barbados – WFM
- Wijesuriya, Suneetha Sri Lanka
- Wijesuriya, Vineetha (1970) Sri Lanka – WCM
- Wolf-Kalmar, Paula (1881–1931) Austria
- Wu Mingqian (1961) China – WGM

== X ==
- Xiao Yiyi (1996) China – WGM
- Xie Jun (1970) China – Women's World champion, GM 1994
- Xu Yuanyuan (1981) China – WGM
- Xu Yuhua (1976) China – Women's World champion, GM 2007

== Y ==
- Yakovleva, Lora (1932) Russia – ICCF Women's World Champion
- Yakubboeva, Nilufar (2000) Uzbekistan – WIM
- Yan Tianqi (2002) China – WIM
- Yao Lan (2000) England - WGM
- Yıldız, Betül Cemre (1989) Turkey – WGM
- Yuanling Yuan (1994) China – WIM
- Yuan Ye (2000) China
- Yuliana, Evi (2002) Indonesia – WFM

== Z ==
- Zaki, Jana Mohamed (2009) Egypt – WIM
- Zatonskih, Anna (1978) Ukraine, USA – WGM and IM
- Zatulovskaya, Tatiana (1935) Azerbaijan, Russia, Israel – WGM
- Zawadzka, Beata (1986) Poland – WGM
- Zhai Mo (1966) China – WGM
- Zhang Xiaowen (1989) China – WGM
- Zhao Lan (1963) China – WIM
- Zhao Xue (1985) China – GM 2008
- Zhu Chen (1976) China, Qatar – Women's World champion, GM 2001
- Zhu Jin'er (2002) China – WIM
- Zhukova, Natalia (1979) Ukraine – GM 2010
- Zvorykina, Kira (1919–2014) Ukraine, Belarus, Bulgaria – WGM

== See also ==
- Category:Chess Woman Grandmasters
- Women's World Chess Championship
- Women in chess
