= Women's Chess World Cup 2021 =

Chess tournament in Sochi, Russia

FIDE Women's Chess World Cup 2021
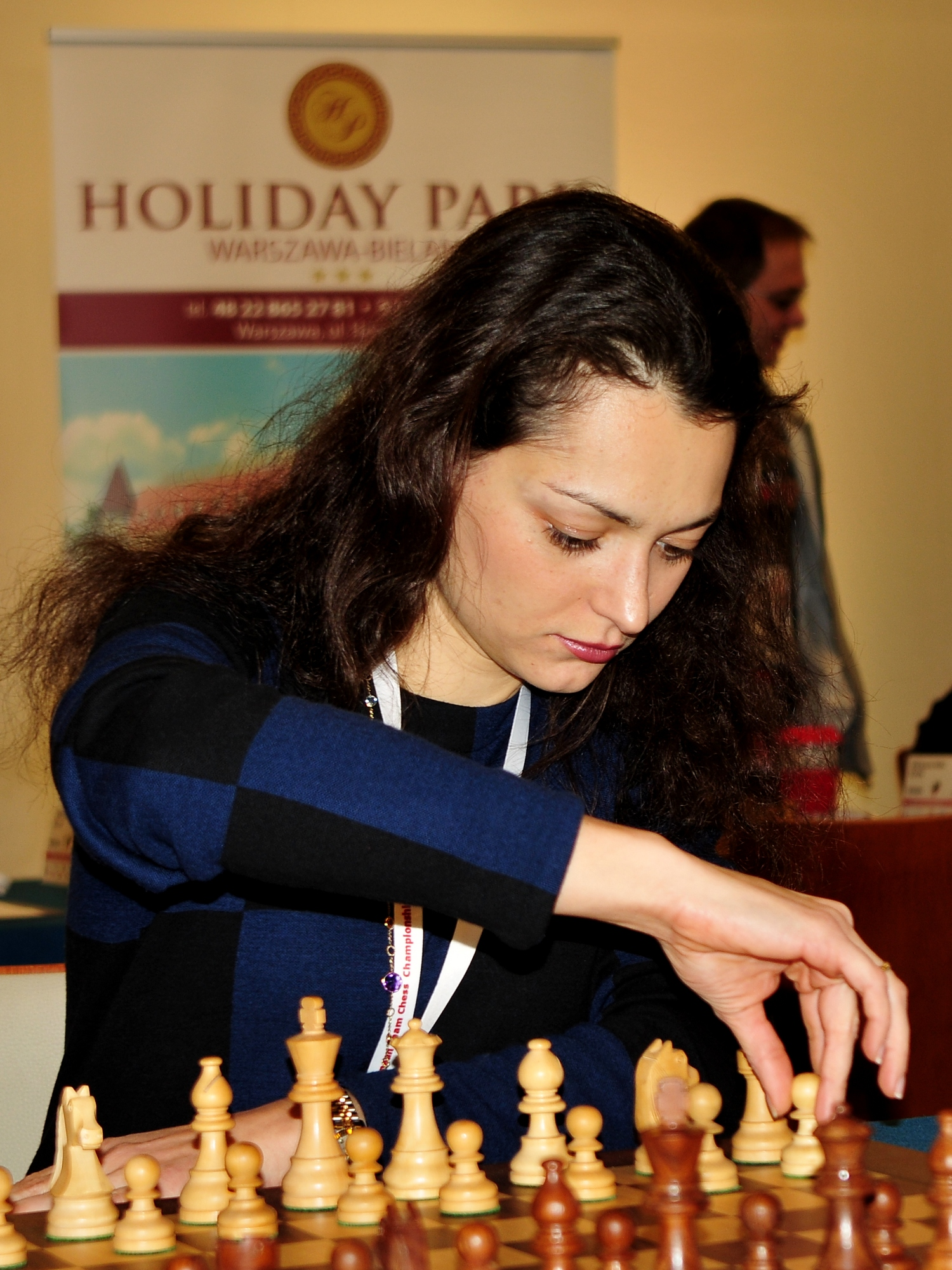
- 2021 FIDE Women's World Cup winner Alexandra Kosteniuk.

Tournament information
- Sport: Chess
- Location: (Russia) Sochi
- Dates: 12 July 2021–3 August 2021
- Administrator: FIDE
- Tournament format: Single-elimination tournament
- Host: Chess Federation of Russia
- Participants: 103

Final positions
- Champion: (Russia) Alexandra Kosteniuk
- Runner-up: (Russia) Aleksandra Goryachkina

The Women's Chess World Cup 2021 was a 103-player single-elimination chess tournament, the first edition of Women's Chess World Cup, that took place in Sochi, Russia, from 12 July to 3 August 2021. It was the inaugural edition of a women's-only version of the FIDE World Cup. The tournament was held in parallel with the Chess World Cup 2021, an open tournament.

The tournament formed part of the qualification for the Women's World Chess Championship 2023. The top three finishers, other than Women's World Chess Champion Ju Wenjun and players who had otherwise qualified, qualified for the Women's Candidates Tournament 2022–23.

== Format ==
The format was a 7-round knockout event. 78 women played one another in the first round. The 39 that went through were joined in the second round by the top 25 seeds, who were given a bye for the first round. The losers of the two semi-finals played one another for third place.

Each round consisted of two classical games with shorter tiebreaks as needed. Their time controls were as follows:

1. Two classical time limit games: 90 minutes for the first 40 moves with 30 minutes added for the rest of the game, with a 30-second increment per move.
2. If tied, two games of 25 minutes with a 10 second increment per move.
3. If tied, two games of 10 minutes with a 10 second increment per move.
4. If tied, two games of 5 minutes with a 3 second increment per move.
5. If the match was still tied, a single armageddon game was played. The players drew lots and the winner of the draw chose their color. White received 5 minutes, black received 4 minutes, and each player received a 2-second increment per move beginning at move 61.

=== Prize money ===
The total prize fund was US$676,250, with a first prize of US$50,000.

Prize money in US dollars
Round	Prizes	Total
Round 1	39 × $3,750	$146,250
Round 2	32 × $5,000	$160,000
Round 3	16 × $6,750	$108,000
Round 4	8 × $9,500	$76,000
Round 5	4 × $14,000	$56,000
4th place	1 × $20,000	$20,000
3rd place	1 × $25,000	$25,000
Runner-up	1 × $35,000	$35,000
Winner	1 × $50,000	$50,000
Total		676,250

== Participants ==
The following was the list of participants. Players were seeded by their FIDE rating of June 2021.

1. Aleksandra Goryachkina (RUS), GM, 2596 (E18)
2. Kateryna Lagno (RUS), GM, 2558 (WC)
3. Mariya Muzychuk (UKR), GM, 2544 (WC)
4. Anna Muzychuk (UKR), GM, 2535 (R)
5. Nana Dzagnidze (GEO), GM, 2524 (E18)
6. Harika Dronavalli (IND), GM, 2515 (R)
7. Tan Zhongyi (CHN), GM, 2511 (R)
8. Dinara Saduakassova (KAZ), IM, 2500 (AS19)
9. Alina Kashlinskaya (RUS), IM, 2494 (E19)
10. Sarasadat Khademalsharieh (IRI), IM, 2494 (Z3.1)
11. Nino Batsiashvili (GEO), GM, 2491 (FN)
12. Polina Shuvalova (RUS), IM, 2489 (J19)
13. Lela Javakhishvili (GEO), IM, 2473 (E18)
14. Alexandra Kosteniuk (RUS), GM, 2472 (WC)
15. Zhansaya Abdumalik (KAZ), GM, 2472 (R)
16. Antoaneta Stefanova (BUL), GM, 2470 (E18)
17. Natalia Pogonina (RUS), WGM, 2469 (R)
18. Bela Khotenashvili (GEO), GM, 2463 (PN)
19. Pia Cramling (SWE), GM, 2459 (E19)
20. Elisabeth Pähtz (GER), IM, 2456 (E18)
21. Olga Girya (RUS), WGM, 2448 (R)
22. Anastasia Bodnaruk (RUS), IM, 2446 (E19)
23. Gunay Mammadzada (AZE), IM, 2443 (E18)
24. Alisa Galliamova (RUS), IM, 2442 (PN)
25. Irina Bulmaga (ROU), IM, 2440 (FN)
26. Marie Sebag (FRA), GM, 2438 (E18)
27. Valentina Gunina (RUS), GM, 2436 (E18)
28. Carissa Yip (USA), IM, 2430 (FN)
29. Ekaterina Atalik (TUR), IM, 2430 (E18)
30. Anna Ushenina (UKR), GM, 2429 (E18)
31. Batkhuyagiin Möngöntuul (MGL), IM, 2428 (PN)
32. Ana Matnadze (ESP), IM, 2421 (FN)
33. Olga Badelka (BLR), IM, 2418 (PN)
34. Iulija Osmak (UKR), IM, 2418 (E18)
35. Karina Cyfka (POL), IM, 2417 (E18)
36. Pauline Guichard (FRA), IM, 2413 (E19)
37. Nataliya Buksa (UKR), IM, 2413 (FN)
38. Irine Kharisma Sukandar (INA), IM, 2413 (FN)
39. Almira Skripchenko (FRA), IM, 2411 (FN)
40. Elina Danielian (ARM), GM, 2407 (FN)
41. Hoang Thanh Trang (HUN), GM, 2404 (FN)
42. Laura Unuk (SLO), IM, 2404 (E18)
43. Jolanta Zawadzka (POL), WGM, 2403 (E19)
44. Leya Garifullina (RUS), WGM, 2399 (FN)
45. Nurgyul Salimova (BUL), IM, 2395 (E19)
46. Monika Soćko (POL), GM, 2393 (E19)
47. Vaishali Rameshbabu (IND), WGM, 2393 (FN)
48. Bhakti Kulkarni (IND), IM, 2391 (Z3.7)
49. Aleksandra Maltsevskaya (RUS), WGM, 2390 (J18)
50. Bibisara Assaubayeva (KAZ), IM, 2389 (FN)
51. Deysi Cori (PER), WGM, 2388 (AM18)
52. Gulnar Mammadova (AZE), IM, 2382 (FN)
53. Marina Brunello (ITA), IM, 2379 (E19)
54. Stavroula Tsolakidou (GRE), IM, 2379 (E19)
55. Padmini Rout (IND), IM, 2370 (AS18)
56. Lisandra Teresa Ordaz Valdés (CUB), IM, 2369 (FN)
57. Klaudia Kulon (POL), IM, 2363 (E18)
58. Betül Cemre Yıldız (TUR), WGM, 2362 (FN)
59. Medina Warda Aulia (INA), IM, 2360 (Z3.3)
60. Peng Zhaoqin (NED), GM, 2358 (FN)
61. Tatev Abrahamyan (USA), WGM, 2358 (Z2.1)
62. Inna Gaponenko (UKR), IM, 2357 (E19)
63. Teodora Injac (SRB), WGM, 2355 (FN)
64. Carolina Luján (ARG), IM, 2346 (FN)
65. Gulrukhbegim Tokhirjonova (USA), WGM, 2344 (PN)
66. Dina Belenkaya (RUS), WGM, 2341 (E19)
67. Joanna Majdan (POL), WGM, 2339 (FN)
68. Viktoria Radeva (BUL), WGM, 2335 (FN)
69. Anna Afonasieva (RUS), WIM, 2323 (ON)
70. Jana Schneider (GER), FM, 2321 (FN)
71. Mobina Alinasab (IRI), WIM, 2317 (FN)
72. Jennifer Yu (USA), WGM, 2316 (Z2.1)
73. Turkan Mamedjarova (AZE), WGM, 2309 (E19)
74. Ulviyya Fataliyeva (AZE), WGM, 2301 (E19)
75. Julia Ryjanova (AUS), WGM, 2299 (Z3.6)
76. Turmunkh Munkhzul (MGL), WIM, 2278 (FN)
77. Mai Narva (EST), WIM, 2276 (PN)
78. Nilufar Yakubbaeva (UZB), WIM, 2273 (Z3.4)
79. Yerisbel Miranda Llanes (CUB), WIM, 2262 (Z2.3)
80. Maili-Jade Ouellet (CAN), WGM, 2257 (AM19)
81. Anastasya Paramzina (RUS), WGM, 2256 (E19)
82. Qiyu Zhou (CAN), WGM, 2229 (FN)
83. Melissa Castrillón Gómez (COL), WIM, 2201 (FN)
84. Ingrid Aliaga Fernández (PER), WIM, 2191 (FN)
85. Zenia Corrales Jiménez (MEX), WIM, 2189 (FN)
86. Julia Alboredo (BRA), WFM, 2182 (FN)
87. Shrook Wafa (EGY), WGM, 2182 (AF)
88. Janelle Mae Frayna (PHI), WGM, 2179 (FN)
89. Gabriela Vargas (PAR), WIM, 2170 (Z2.5)
90. Shahenda Wafa (EGY), WGM, 2106 (FN)
91. Javiera Belén Gómez Barrera (CHI), WIM, 2083 (FN)
92. Sabrina Latreche (ALG), WIM, 2076 (AF)
93. Tilsia Carolina Varela La Madrid (VEN), WIM, 2072 (FN)
94. Svitlana Demchenko (CAN), WIM, 2071 (Z2.2)
95. Amina Mezioud (ALG), WGM, 2071 (PN)
96. Jemal Ovezdurdiyeva (TKM), WFM, 2061 (FN)
97. Puteri Munajjah Az-Zahraa Azhar (MAS), WIM, 2046 (FN)
98. Umida Omonova (UZB), WFM, 2035 (FN)
99. Ayah Moaataz (EGY), WIM, 2015 (AF)
100. Anahi Ortiz Verdezoto (ECU), WIM, 2013 (Z2.3)
101. Sharmin Sultana Shirin (BAN), WIM, 2009 (Z3.2)
102. Jesse February (RSA), WIM, 1863 (PN)
103. Penelope Drastik (AUS), 1835 (FN)

Qualification paths

- WC: Semifinalists of the Women's World Chess Championship 2018
- J18 and J19: World Junior Champions 2018 and 2019
- R: Rating
- E18 and E19: European Individual Championships 2018 and 2019
- AM18 and AM19: American Continental Chess Championship 2018 and 2019
- AS18 and AS19: Asian Chess Championship 2018 and 2019
- AF: African Chess Championship 2019
- Z2.1, Z2.2, Z2.3, Z2.4, Z2.5, Z3.1, Z3.2, Z3.3, Z3.4, Z3.6, Z3.7: Zonal tournaments
- FN: Federation's nominee
- ON: Organiser's nominee
- PN: FIDE President's nominee

Replacements

The following are the players from the list of qualifiers who declined to play, and their replacements:

- Ju Wenjun (CHN) (WC) → Zhansaya Abdumalik (KAZ) (R)
- Hou Yifan (CHN) (R) → Natalia Pogonina (RUS) (R)
- Koneru Humpy (IND) (R) → Olga Girya (RUS) (R)
- Zhu Jiner (CHN) (Z3.5) → an extra presidential nominee (PN)
- Huang Qian (CHN) (Z3.5) → an extra presidential nominee (PN)
- Zhai Mo (CHN) (Z3.5) → an extra presidential nominee (PN)
- Lei Tingjie (CHN) (Z3.5) → an extra presidential nominee (PN)

In addition, three federations (China, Saudi Arabia, Vietnam) did not nominate a player.

== Results ==
Due to the size of the bracket, the results view is made up of two parts on this page. Rounds one through four are shown first, split up into different sections of the bracket. They then join again for the quarterfinals and beyond, which are shown afterwards.

=== Rounds 1-4 ===
==== Section 1 ====
First round
1	(Russia) Aleksandra Goryachkina	Bye
-	Bye
65	(United States) Gulrukhbegim Tokhirjonova	1½
64	(Argentina) Carolina Luján	½
33	(Belarus) Olga Badelka	w/o
96	(Turkmenistan) Jemal Ovezdurdiyeva
97	(Malaysia) Puteri Munajjah Az-Zahraa Azhar	½
32	(Spain) Ana Matnadze	1½
17	(Russia) Natalia Pogonina	Bye
-	Bye
81	(Russia) Anastasya Paramzina
48	(India) Bhakti Kulkarni	w/o
49	(Russia) Aleksandra Maltsevskaya	1½
80	(Canada) Maili-Jade Ouellet	½
-	Bye
16	(Bulgaria) Antoaneta Stefanova	Bye

Second round
1	(Russia) Aleksandra Goryachkina	2
65	(United States) Gulrukhbegim Tokhirjonova	0
33	(Belarus) Olga Badelka	5
32	(Spain) Ana Matnadze	4
17	(Russia) Natalia Pogonina	1½
48	(India) Bhakti Kulkarni	½
49	(Russia) Aleksandra Maltsevskaya	½
16	(Bulgaria) Antoaneta Stefanova	1½

Third round
1	(Russia) Aleksandra Goryachkina	1½
33	(Belarus) Olga Badelka	½
17	(Russia) Natalia Pogonina	½
16	(Bulgaria) Antoaneta Stefanova	1½

Fourth round
1	(Russia) Aleksandra Goryachkina	3
16	(Bulgaria) Antoaneta Stefanova	1

==== Section 2 ====
First round
9	(Russia) Alina Kashlinskaya	Bye
-	Bye
73	(Azerbaijan) Turkan Mamedyarova	½
56	(Cuba) Lisandra Teresa Ordaz Valdés	1½
41	(Hungary) Hoang Thanh Trang	2½
88	(Philippines) Janelle Mae Frayna	1½
-	Bye
24	(Russia) Alisa Galliamova	Bye
25	(Romania) Irina Bulmaga	Bye
–	Bye
89	(Paraguay) Gabriela Vargas	0
40	(Armenia) Elina Danielian	2
57	(Poland) Klaudia Kulon	1
72	(United States) Jennifer Yu	3
-	Bye
8	(Kazakhstan) Dinara Saduakassova	Bye

Second round
9	(Russia) Alina Kashlinskaya	1½
56	(Cuba) Lisandra Teresa Ordaz Valdés	½
41	(Hungary) Hoang Thanh Trang	½
24	(Russia) Alisa Galliamova	1½
25	(Romania) Irina Bulmaga	0
40	(Armenia) Elina Danielian	2
72	(United States) Jennifer Yu	0
8	(Kazakhstan) Dinara Saduakassova	2

Third round
9	(Russia) Alina Kashlinskaya	1½
24	(Russia) Alisa Galliamova	½
40	(Armenia) Elina Danielian	½
8	(Kazakhstan) Dinara Saduakassova	1½

Fourth round
9	(Russia) Alina Kashlinskaya	2
8	(Kazakhstan) Dinara Saduakassova	4

==== Section 3 ====
First round
5	(Georgia (country)) Nana Dzagnidze	Bye
-	Bye
69	(Russia) Anna Afonasieva	0
60	(Netherlands) Peng Zhaoqin	2
37	(Ukraine) Nataliya Buksa	2½
92	(Algeria) Sabrina Latreche	1½
101	(Bangladesh) Sharmin Sultana Shirin	0
28	(United States) Carissa Yip	2
21	(Russia) Olga Girya	Bye
-	Bye
85	(Mexico) Zenia Corrales Jiménez	0
44	(Russia) Leya Garifullina	2
53	(Italy) Marina Brunello	0
76	(Mongolia) Turmunkh Munkhzul	2
-	Bye
12	(Russia) Polina Shuvalova	Bye

Second round
5	(Georgia (country)) Nana Dzagnidze	2
60	(Netherlands) Peng Zhaoqin	0
37	(Ukraine) Nataliya Buksa	1
28	(United States) Carissa Yip	3
21	(Russia) Olga Girya	½
44	(Russia) Leya Garifullina	1½
76	(Mongolia) Turmunkh Munkhzul	0
12	(Russia) Polina Shuvalova	2

Third round
5	(Georgia (country)) Nana Dzagnidze	3
28	(United States) Carissa Yip	1
44	(Russia) Leya Garifullina	2½
12	(Russia) Polina Shuvalova	3½

Fourth round
5	(Georgia (country)) Nana Dzagnidze	3½
12	(Russia) Polina Shuvalova	2½

==== Section 4 ====
First round
13	(Georgia (country)) Lela Javakhishvili	Bye
-	Bye
77	(Estonia) Mai Narva	3½
52	(Azerbaijan) Gulnar Mammadova	4½
45	(Bulgaria) Nurgyul Salimova	2½
84	(Peru) Ingrid Aliaga Fernández	1½
-	Bye
20	(Germany) Elisabeth Pähtz	Bye
29	(Turkey) Ekaterina Atalik	2
100	(Ecuador) Anahí Ortiz Verdezoto	0
93	(Venezuela) Tilsia Carolina Varela La Madrid	1½
36	(France) Pauline Guichard	2½
61	(United States) Tatev Abrahamyan	2
68	(Bulgaria) Viktoria Radeva	0
-	Bye
4	(Ukraine) Anna Muzychuk	Bye

Second round
13	(Georgia (country)) Lela Javakhishvili	1
52	(Azerbaijan) Gulnar Mammadova	3
45	(Bulgaria) Nurgyul Salimova	3½
20	(Germany) Elisabeth Pähtz	4½
29	(Turkey) Ekaterina Atalik	½
36	(France) Pauline Guichard	1½
61	(United States) Tatev Abrahamyan	0
4	(Ukraine) Anna Muzychuk	2

Third round
52	(Azerbaijan) Gulnar Mammadova	½
20	(Germany) Elisabeth Pähtz	1½
36	(France) Pauline Guichard	½
4	(Ukraine) Anna Muzychuk	1½

Fourth round
20	(Germany) Elisabeth Pähtz	½
4	(Ukraine) Anna Muzychuk	1½

==== Section 5 ====
First round
3	(Ukraine) Mariya Muzychuk	Bye
-	Bye
67	(Poland) Joanna Majdan	½
62	(Ukraine) Inna Gaponenko	1½
35	(Poland) Karina Cyfka	3½
94	(Canada) Svitlana Demchenko	2½
99	(Egypt) Ayah Moaataz	1½
30	(Ukraine) Anna Ushenina	2½
19	(Sweden) Pia Cramling	Bye
-	Bye
83	(Colombia) Melissa Castrillón Gómez	½
46	(Poland) Monika Soćko	1½
51	(Peru) Deysi Cori	1½
78	(Uzbekistan) Nilufar Yakubbaeva	½
-	Bye
14	(Russia) Alexandra Kosteniuk	Bye

Second round
3	(Ukraine) Mariya Muzychuk	1½
62	(Ukraine) Inna Gaponenko	½
35	(Poland) Karina Cyfka	½
30	(Ukraine) Anna Ushenina	1½
19	(Sweden) Pia Cramling	3½
46	(Poland) Monika Soćko	2½
51	(Peru) Deysi Cori	0
14	(Russia) Alexandra Kosteniuk	2

Third round
3	(Ukraine) Mariya Muzychuk	4½
30	(Ukraine) Anna Ushenina	3½
19	(Sweden) Pia Cramling	½
14	(Russia) Alexandra Kosteniuk	1½

Fourth round
3	(Ukraine) Mariya Muzychuk	½
14	(Russia) Alexandra Kosteniuk	1½

==== Section 6 ====
First round
11	(Georgia (country)) Nino Batsiashvili	Bye
-	Bye
75	(Australia) Julia Ryjanova	½
54	(Greece) Stavroula Tsolakidou	1½
43	(Poland) Jolanta Zawadzka	1½
86	(Brazil) Julia Alboredo	½
-	Bye
22	(Russia) Anastasia Bodnaruk	Bye
27	(Russia) Valentina Gunina	1½
102	(South Africa) Jesse February	½
91	(Chile) Javiera Belén Gómez Barrera	½
38	(Indonesia) Irine Kharisma Sukandar	1½
59	(Indonesia) Medina Warda Aulia	2
70	(Germany) Jana Schneider	0
-	Bye
6	(India) Harika Dronavalli	Bye

Second round
11	(Georgia (country)) Nino Batsiashvili	1½
54	(Greece) Stavroula Tsolakidou	½
43	(Poland) Jolanta Zawadzka	2
22	(Russia) Anastasia Bodnaruk	0
27	(Russia) Valentina Gunina	2
38	(Indonesia) Irine Kharisma Sukandar	0
59	(Indonesia) Medina Warda Aulia	0
6	(India) Harika Dronavalli	2

Third round
11	(Georgia (country)) Nino Batsiashvili	2
43	(Poland) Jolanta Zawadzka	0
27	(Russia) Valentina Gunina	1½
6	(India) Harika Dronavalli	½

Fourth round
11	(Georgia (country)) Nino Batsiashvili	½
27	(Russia) Valentina Gunina	1½

==== Section 7 ====
First round
7	(China) Tan Zhongyi	Bye
-	Bye
71	(Iran) Mobina Alinasab	½
58	(Turkey) Betül Cemre Yıldız	1½
39	(France) Almira Skripchenko	4
90	(Egypt) Shahenda Wafa	2
103	(Australia) Penelope Drastik	½
26	(France) Marie Sebag	1½
23	(Azerbaijan) Gunay Mammadzada	Bye
-	Bye
87	(Egypt) Shrook Wafa	0
42	(Slovenia) Laura Unuk	2
55	(India) Padmini Rout	2
74	(Azerbaijan) Ulviyya Fataliyeva	0
-	Bye
10	(Iran) Sarasadat Khademalsharieh	Bye

Second round
7	(China) Tan Zhongyi	1½
58	(Turkey) Betül Cemre Yıldız	½
39	(France) Almira Skripchenko	2½
26	(France) Marie Sebag	3½
23	(Azerbaijan) Gunay Mammadzada	1½
42	(Slovenia) Laura Unuk	½
55	(India) Padmini Rout	1
10	(Iran) Sarasadat Khademalsharieh	3

Third round
7	(China) Tan Zhongyi	2
26	(France) Marie Sebag	0
23	(Azerbaijan) Gunay Mammadzada	½
10	(Iran) Sarasadat Khademalsharieh	1½

Fourth round
7	(China) Tan Zhongyi	1½
10	(Iran) Sarasadat Khademalsharieh	½

==== Section 8 ====
First round
15	(Kazakhstan) Zhansaya Abdumalik	Bye
-	Bye
79	(Cuba) Yerisbel Miranda Llanes	½
50	(Kazakhstan) Bibisara Assaubayeva	1½
47	(India) Vaishali Rameshbabu	2
82	(Canada) Qiyu Zhou	0
-	Bye
18	(Georgia (country)) Bela Khotenashvili	Bye
31	(Mongolia) Batkhuyagiin Möngöntuul	1½
98	(Uzbekistan) Umida Omonova	½
95	(Algeria) Amina Mezioud	½
34	(Ukraine) Iulija Osmak	1½
63	(Serbia) Teodora Injac	2
66	(Russia) Dina Belenkaya	0
-	Bye
2	(Russia) Kateryna Lagno	Bye

Second round
15	(Kazakhstan) Zhansaya Abdumalik	1½
50	(Kazakhstan) Bibisara Assaubayeva	2½
47	(India) Vaishali Rameshbabu	0
18	(Georgia (country)) Bela Khotenashvili	2
31	(Mongolia) Batkhuyagiin Möngöntuul	2
34	(Ukraine) Iulija Osmak	0
63	(Serbia) Teodora Injac	½
2	(Russia) Kateryna Lagno	1½

Third round
50	(Kazakhstan) Bibisara Assaubayeva	4
18	(Georgia (country)) Bela Khotenashvili	2
31	(Mongolia) Batkhuyagiin Möngöntuul	½
2	(Russia) Kateryna Lagno	1½

Fourth round
50	(Kazakhstan) Bibisara Assaubayeva	1½
2	(Russia) Kateryna Lagno	2½

=== Rounds 5-7 ===
Quarterfinals
1	(Russia) Aleksandra Goryachkina	1½
8	(Kazakhstan) Dinara Saduakassova	½
5	(Georgia (country)) Nana Dzagnidze	1
4	(Ukraine) Anna Muzychuk	3
14	(Russia) Alexandra Kosteniuk	2
27	(Russia) Valentina Gunina	0
7	(China) Tan Zhongyi	1½
2	(Russia) Kateryna Lagno	½

Semifinals
1	(Russia) Aleksandra Goryachkina	1½
4	(Ukraine) Anna Muzychuk	½
14	(Russia) Alexandra Kosteniuk	1½
7	(China) Tan Zhongyi	½

Finals
1	(Russia) Aleksandra Goryachkina	½
14	(Russia) Alexandra Kosteniuk	1½
3rd Place
4	(Ukraine) Anna Muzychuk	1½
7	(China) Tan Zhongyi	2½

=== Third place ===
Seed	Name	Jul 2021 rating	1	2	R1	R2	Total
4	(Ukraine) Anna Muzychuk	2527	½	½	0	½	1½
7	(China) Tan Zhongyi	2511	½	½	1	½	2½

=== Finals ===
Seed	Name	Jul 2021 rating	1	2	Total
1	(Russia) Aleksandra Goryachkina	2596	0	½	½
14	(Russia) Alexandra Kosteniuk	2472	1	½	1½

== See also ==
- Chess World Cup 2021
- Women's World Chess Championship
