= Tilsia Varela =

Venezuelan chess player (born 1994)

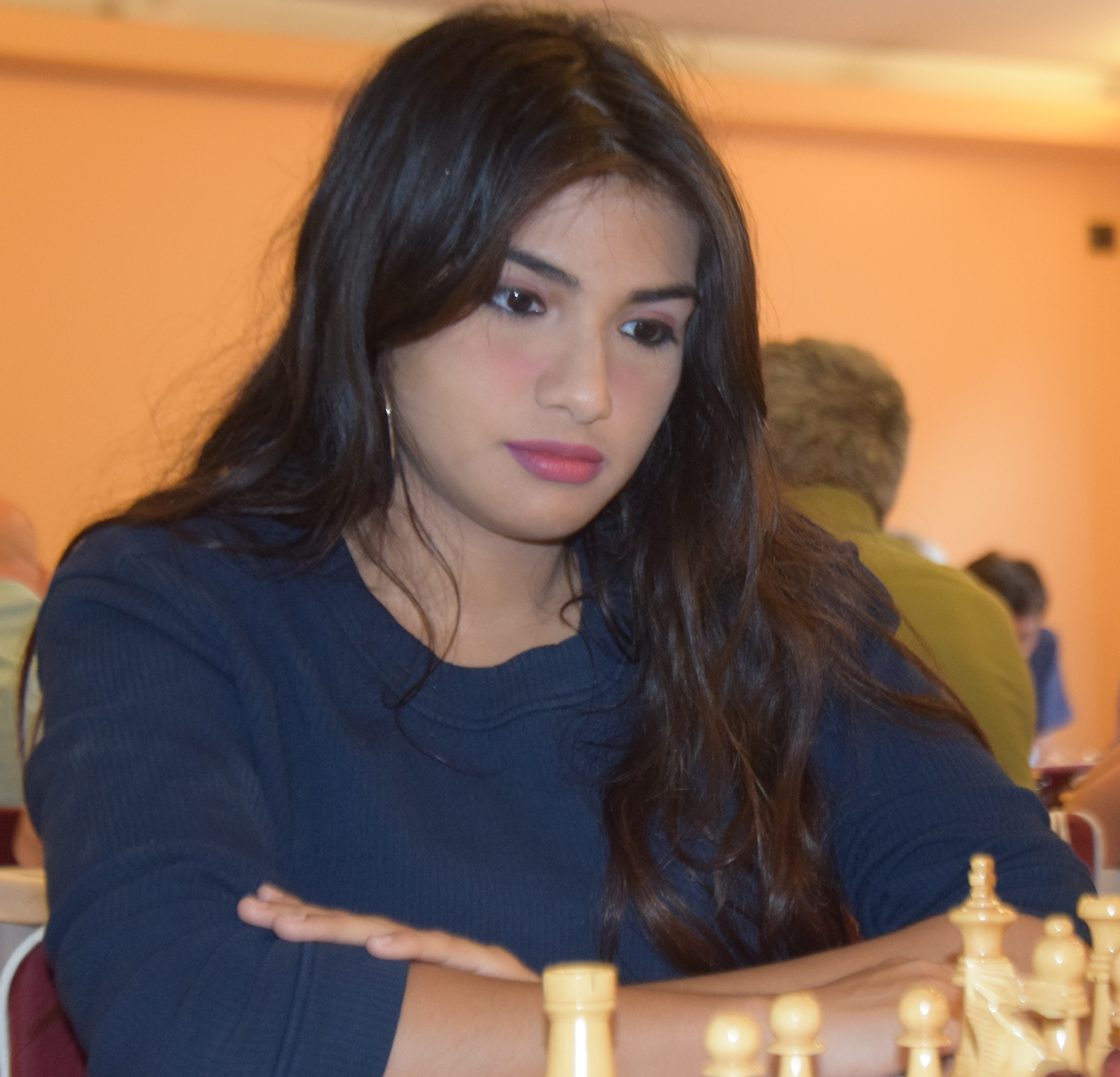
- Varela at the 2019 Andorra open

Personal information
- Born: Tilsia Carolina Varela La Madrid; August 19, 1994 (age 31) Maracaibo, Venezuela

Chess career
- Country: Venezuela
- Title: Woman International Master (2013)
- Peak rating: 2118 (November 2022)

Tilsia Carolina Varela La Madrid (born 1994), is a Venezuelan chess player. She was awarded the title of Woman International Master in 2013.

== Chess career ==
She has represented Venezuela at a number of Women's Chess Olympiads, including 2012, where she scored 3½/7 on board four, 2014 (6/8 as first reserve) and 2016 (4/9 on board three).

She qualified for the Women's Chess World Cup 2021, where she took Pauline Guichard to tiebreaks before eventually being defeated 2½-1½ in the first round.

She again qualified for the Women's Chess World Cup 2023, being eliminated by Olga Badelka in the first round.
