= 2021 World Cup =

2021 World Cup may refer to:

- 2021 Rugby World Cup
- 2021 Men's Rugby League World Cup
- 2021 Rugby League World Cup
- 2021 Women's Rugby League World Cup
- Chess World Cup 2021
- Women's Chess World Cup 2021
