= Jemal Ovezdurdiyeva =

Turkmenistani chess player (born 1998)

Personal information
- Born: 1998 (age 27–28)

Chess career
- Country: Turkmenistan (until 2025); Romania (since 2025)
- Title: Woman International Master (2025)
- Peak rating: 2220 (June 2026)

Jemal Ovezdurdiyeva (born 1998) is a Turkmenistani chess player who represents Romania. She was awarded the title of Woman International Master in 2025.

== Chess Career ==
She has represented Turkmenistan in a number of Women's Chess Olympiads, including:

- 2014, where she was selected, but the team did not compete.
- 2016, scoring 5/5/11 on board two.
- 2018, scoring 8/10 on board three.

She qualified for the Women's Chess World Cup 2021, and was drawn to play Olga Badelka in the first round, with Badelka winning on a walkover.
