= Zenia Corrales Jiménez =

Cuban-Mexican chess player (born 1989)

Personal information
- Born: March 11, 1989 (age 37)

Chess career
- Country: Cuba (until 2019); Mexico (since 2019)
- Title: Woman International Master (2011)
- Peak rating: 2243 (May 2012)

Zenia Corrales Jiménez (born 1989) is a Cuban-Mexican chess player. She earned the title of Woman International Master in 2011.

== Chess career ==
She qualified for the Women's Chess World Cup 2021, where she was defeated 2–0 by Leya Garifullina in the first round.

== Personal life ==
Her brother is grandmaster Fidel Corrales Jimenez.
