= Li Ruofan =

Chinese chess player (born 1978)

Personal information
- Born: April 30, 1978 (age 48) Zhenjiang, Jiangsu, China
- Spouse: Zhang Zhong

Chess career
- Country: China; Singapore (2007–2017)
- Title: International Master (2009); Woman Grandmaster (2002)
- Peak rating: 2433 (January 2003)

Li Ruofan (Chinese: 李若凡; pinyin: Lǐ Ruòfán; born April 30, 1978) is a Chinese chess player who holds the FIDE titles of International Master (IM) and Woman Grandmaster (WGM). Notable title victories include the 2001 Asian Women's Chess Championship in Chennai, and the 2006 Chinese Women's Chess Championship in Wuxi with a score of 8½/12.

Li played for the China national "B" team at the 1999 Women's Asian Team Chess Championship with an overall record of 3 games played (+0, =2, -1).

In 2002 Li won the Women's World University Chess Championship in Ulaanbaatar, Mongolia. In 2007, she transferred national federations to represent Singapore. At the 2008 Japfa Chess Festival in Jakarta, Li Ruofan won the WGM Tournament, a six-player double round-robin event. Li played on board one for Singapore at the Women's Chess Olympiad at Baku in 2016, scoring +4 =4 -2 (60%).

In 2017 she moved back to the Chinese federation.

== Personal life ==
Li lives in Shenzhen with her husband and coach, Grandmaster Zhang Zhong.

Awards and achievements
Preceded by Hoang Thanh Trang	Women's Asian Chess Champion; 2001	Succeeded by Humpy Koneru
Preceded by Wang Yu	Women's Chinese Chess Champion; 2006	Succeeded by Hou Yifan
