= Natalia Tsodikova =

American chess player (born 1969)

Personal information
- Born: February 24, 1969 (age 57)
- Spouse: Rostislav Tsodikov

Chess career
- Country: United States
- Title: Woman FIDE Master (2018)
- Peak rating: 2190 (January 1997)

Natalia Tsodikova (also known as Natalya) is an American chess player. She was born in Ukraine in 1969 and migrated to the United States in 1994. She holds the title of Woman FIDE Master, earned in 2018.

== Tournament results ==
She came in 4th in the US Women's Chess Championship in 1995 and 1996. She won the Northern California Women's Championship in 2019, and tied for first with FIDE Master Ruiyang Yan in 2025. (The US Chess Federation treats Northern and Southern California as separate states.)

She has played in the US Senior Women's Championship, a national championship for female players 50 years or older, since it began in 2023. She won the event in both 2024 and 2025. In 2024 she had an insurmountable lead by the end of the 4th round (of 5); she won with a score of 4.5/5 and received a prize of $4000. In 2025 Tsodikova and Anjelina Belakovskaia were tied for first after 5 rounds with a score of 4/5, leading to a blitz and Armageddon playoff. After each player had won one blitz game, Tsodikova won the final Armageddon game on time despite having only 4 minutes to her opponent's 5. The two players split the first-place prize, earning $3000 each.

In 2025 she was a member of the US Women's team in the FIDE World Senior Team Championship (women's 50+ category). The team received the bronze medal, and Tsodikova was the individual top scorer on board 2. In 2026 she was team captain and board 2 of the US Women's team for the World Senior Team event, 50+ section, held in Durres, Albania; this event was not separated by gender. The team won the women's gold medal, given to the women's team with the highest match score.

== Personal life ==
She is married to International Master Rostislav Tsodikov who also serves as her chess coach. He assisted her team with preparation in the 2026 World Senior Team.

While FIDE spells her name "Natalia," she prefers "Natalya."
