= Anna Afonasieva =

Russian chess player (born 2001)

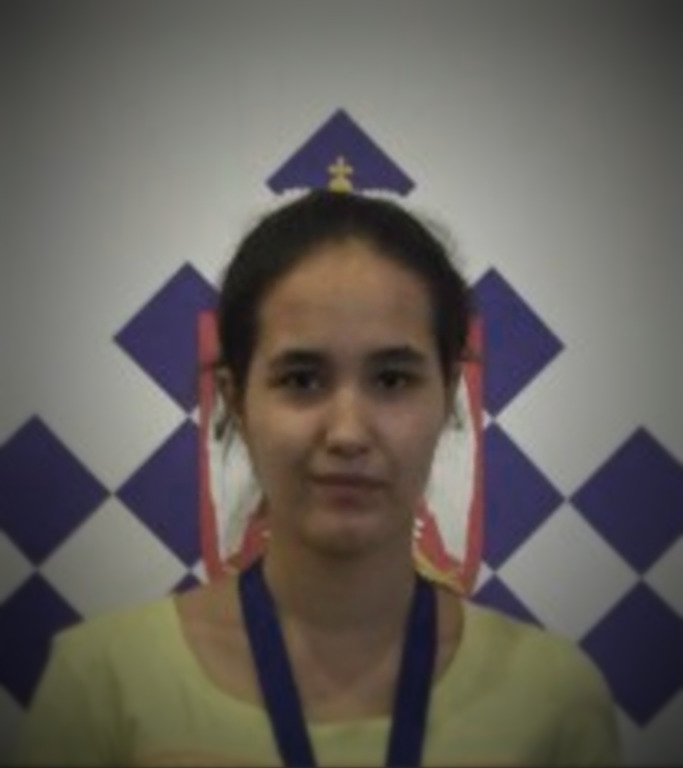

Personal information
- Born: Anna Dmitrievna Afonasieva; 18 February 2001 (age 25) Obninsk, Russia

Chess career
- Country: Russia
- Title: Woman International Master (2020)
- Peak rating: 2370 (July 2019)

Anna Dmitrievna Afonasieva (Russian: Анна Дмитриевна Афонасьева; born 2001) is a Russian chess player. She was awarded the title of Woman International Master in 2020.

== Chess career ==
She qualified for the Women's Chess World Cup 2021, where she was defeated 2-0 by Peng Zhaoqin in the first round. She was awarded the Master of Sports of Russia title later that year.
