= Mary Rudge =

English chess player

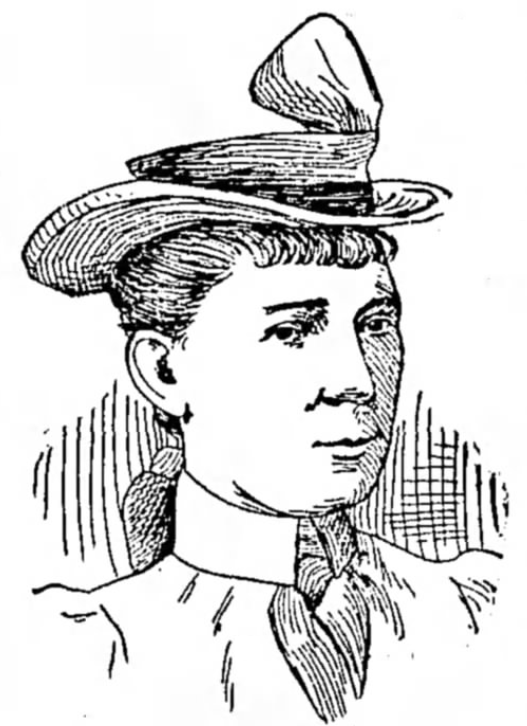
- Born: 6 February 1842; Leominster, England
- Died: 22 November 1919 (aged 77); London, England
- Occupation: Chess master

Mary Rudge (6 February 1842 – 22 November 1919) was an English chess master.

== Early life ==
Rudge was born in Leominster, a small town in Herefordshire, England. She began playing chess in a correspondence tournament in 1872. The first mention of over the board competition is in August 1874 when she played in the second class at the Meeting of the Counties' Chess Association at Birmingham. After the death of her father, Henry Rudge, she moved to Bristol where she started playing chess seriously.

== Career ==
Rudge was the first woman member of the Bristol Chess Club, which did not allow women to be members of the club until she joined in 1872. She played against Joseph Henry Blackburne, who gave a blindfold simultaneous display against ten opponents. The following year she played in another blindfold simultaneous display given by Johannes Hermann Zukertort. In March 1887 she played and drew on board six for Bristol against Bath at the Imperial Hotel in Bristol. At the beginning of 1888, Rudge played and won on board six for Bristol & Clifton against City Chess & Draughts Club. The following year, she won the Challenge Cup of Bristol & Clifton Chess Club. In 1889, she became the first woman in the world to give simultaneous chess exhibitions. She won the Ladies' Challenge Cup at Cambridge 1890, and won the second class at the Southern Counties' tournament at Clifton 1896.

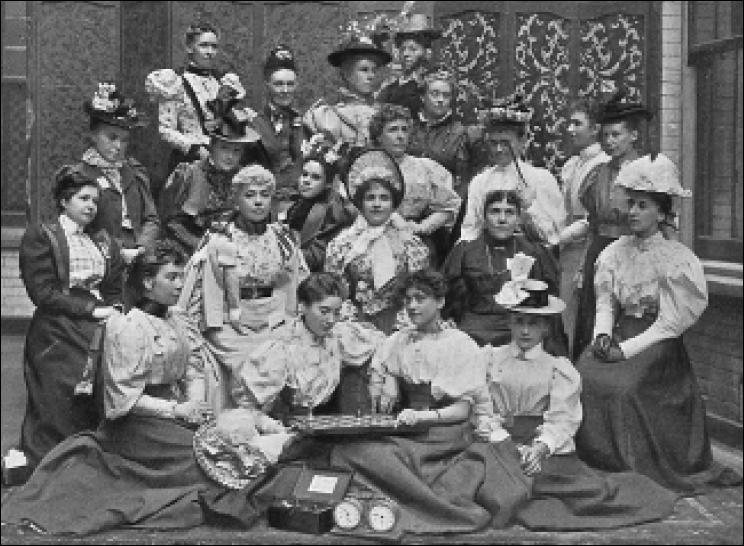
First Women's International Chess Congress

In 1897 she was the winner of the first women’s international chess tournament, which was held under the management of the Ladies' Chess Club of London in conjunction with the Women's Chess Club of New York. Lady Newnes was president of the Tournament Committee, and Sir George Newnes, Baron Albert Salomon von Rothschild, Mr. Harry Nelson Pillsbury and some others offered prizes. The tournament was played at the Hotel Cecil in the Masonic Hall for six days, but the final rounds were decided at the Ideal Café, the headquarters of the Ladies' Chess Club, from 22 June to 3 July 1897. Miss Rudge was 55 years old and the oldest of the 20 players, and had substantial experience playing chess at the time. She was a well-known English player, ranking in chess strength with the first class of the leading men's clubs. She won the event with 18 wins and 1 draw, followed by Signorina Louisa Matilda Fagan (Italy), Miss Eliza Mary Thorold (England), Mrs. Harriet Worrall (USA), Madame Marie Bonnefin (Belgium), Mrs. F.S. Berry (Ireland), Lady Edith Margaret Thomas (England), among others.

Over the next years, she took part in various competitions, playing in Bristol and Dublin. In 1898, she played against world champion Emanuel Lasker in a simultaneous display at the Imperial Hotel. Lasker was unable to finish all the games in the time available, and Rudge's was one of those unfinished. He conceded defeat because he would be lost with best play.

== Death ==
She died in Guy's Hospital, London, on 22 November 1919 at the age of 77.
