= Nadya Ortiz =

Colombian chess player (born 1986)

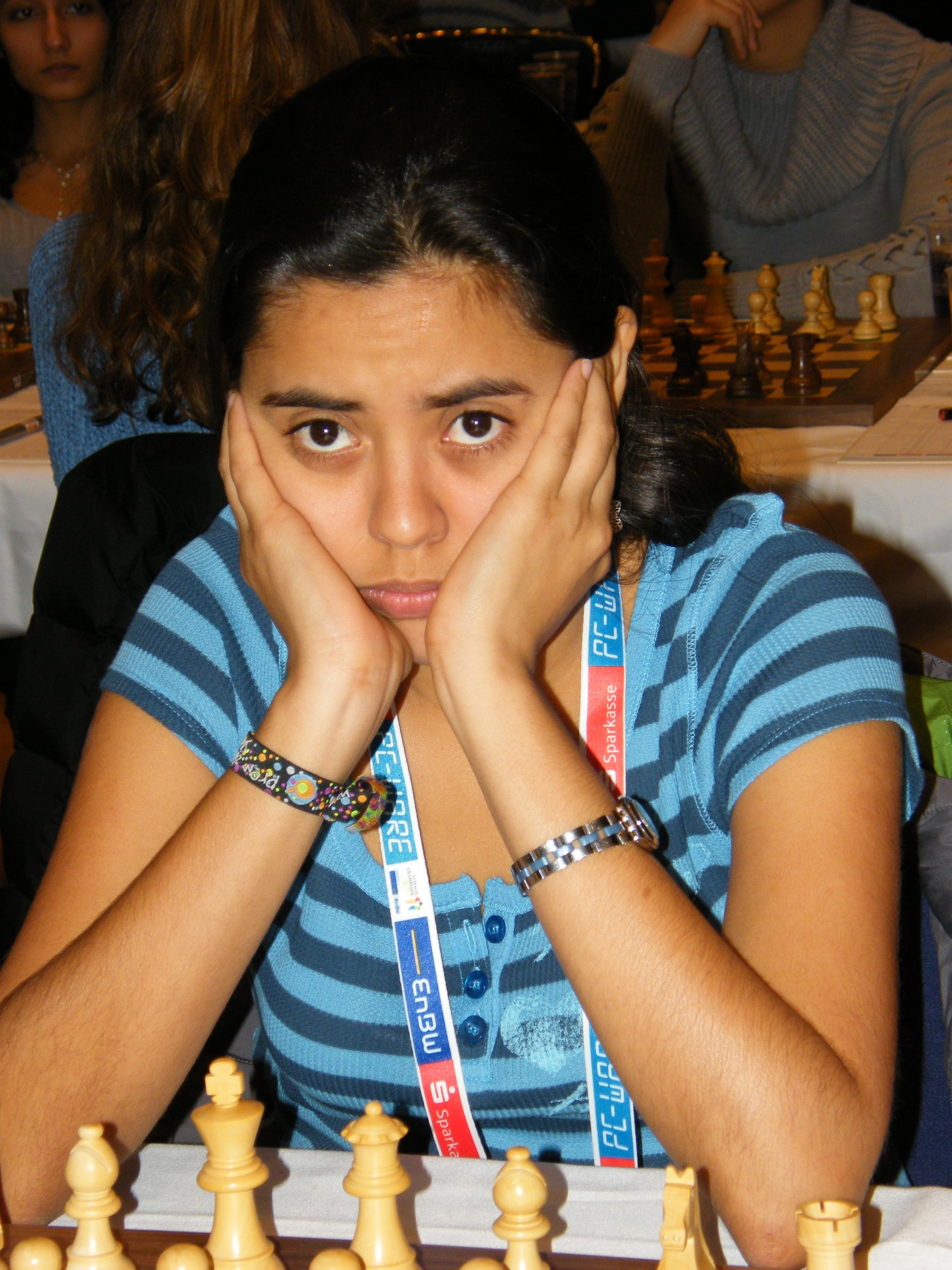
- Ortiz in 2008

Personal information
- Born: Nadya Karolina Ortiz; October 20, 1986 (age 40) Ibagué, Colombia
- Education: University of Texas at Brownsville; Purdue University

Chess career
- Title: Woman Grandmaster (2011)
- Years active: 1996-2012
- Peak rating: 2305 (April 2007)

Nadya Karolina Ortiz (born October 20, 1986) is a Colombian retired chess player and software engineer. In 2011, she obtained the title of Woman Grandmaster, becoming the first Colombian chess player to achieve such recognition.

Ortiz was born in the city of Ibagué, the capital of the Tolima Department. Her father taught her to play chess.

In 1999, she won the Colombian Under-12 school championship in Pereira. In 2001, she won the national women's individual tournament in Medellín, and two years later, the women's Pan American Under-18 championship in Bogotá. For this victory, she received the title of Woman International Master in 2004. As a representative for her country, she played the Chess Olympiads in 2000, 2002, 2004, 2006, 2008, and 2010.

She achieved the final requirement to become Woman Grandmaster in 2010 during the World Chess Olympiad in Khanty-Mansiysk, Russia, and was officially awarded the title in 2011.

She attended the University of Texas at Brownsville on a chess scholarship. She then earned a master's degree in computer science from Purdue University in 2014.
