= Iulia Mashinskaya =

Russian chess player (born 1977)

Personal information
- Born: 1977 (age 48–49)

Chess career
- Country: Russia
- Title: International Master (2005); Woman Grandmaster (1998)
- FIDE rating: 2215 (July 2019)
- Peak rating: 2420 (April 2005)

Iulia Mashinskaya is a Russian chess player who holds the titles of International Master (obtained in February 2005) and Woman Grandmaster.

In January and April 2005, when her rating peaked at 2420, she was ranked 34th in the world for women chess players.

In 2019, Dmitry Kryakvin, writing for the Chess Federation of Russia about the history of chess in Tatarstan, named Mashinskaya as one of Kazan's most successful women players.
