= Anastasya Paramzina =

Russian chess player (born 1998)

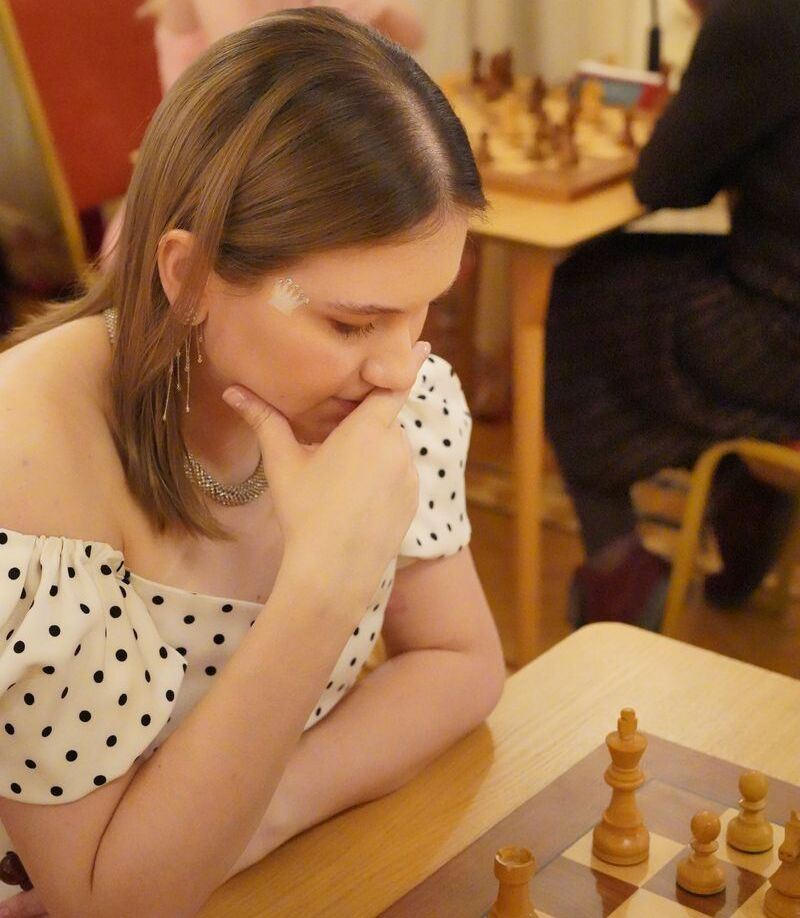
- Anastasya Paramzina in 2023

Personal information
- Born: 30 May 1998 (age 28) Moscow, Russia

Chess career
- Country: Russia (until 2022); FIDE (since 2022)
- Title: Woman Grandmaster (2017)
- Peak rating: 2328 (June 2015)

Anastasya Paramzina (Russian: Анастасия Владимировна Парамзина; born 30 May 1998) is a Russian chess player. She received the FIDE title of Woman Grandmaster (WGM) in 2017.

== Chess career ==
Anastasya Paramzina is Moscow chess school student. Anastasya Paramzina repeatedly represented Russia at the European Youth Chess Championships and World Youth Chess Championships in different age groups, where she reached the best result in 2012 in Prague when she won a silver medal in the girl's U14 age group. In 2013, Anastasya Paramzina played for Russia in the European Girls' U18 Team Chess Championship. In 2017, in World Girls U-20 Championship she was second, behind only the winner Zhansaya Abdumalik.

In 2017, in Riga she participated in Women's European Individual Chess Championship. In September 2020, she won Moscow City Women's Chess Championship.
