= Javiera Belén Gómez Barrera =

Chilean chess player (born 2002)

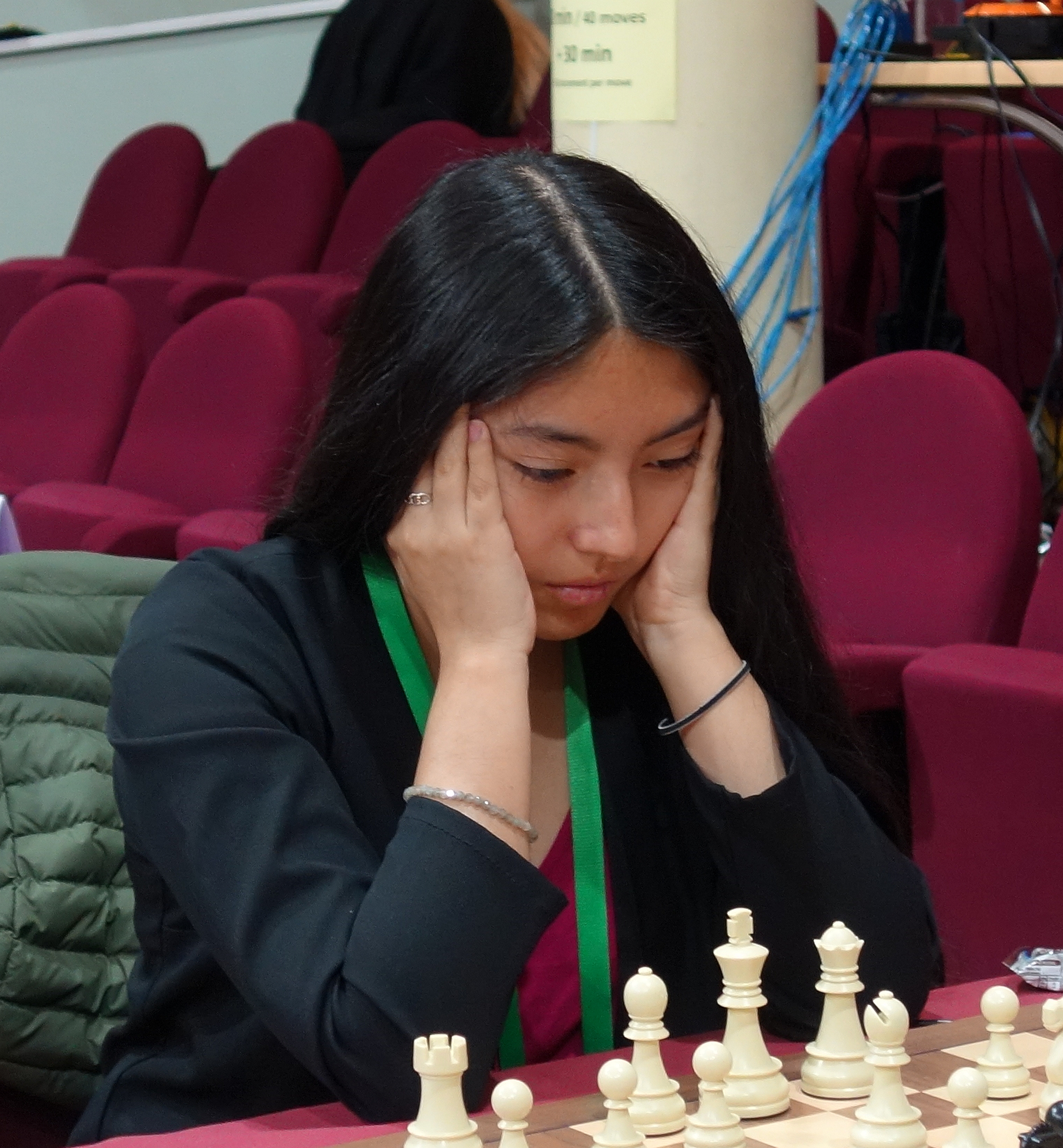
- Gómez in 2023

Personal information
- Born: June 26, 2002 (age 24) Valdivia, Chile

Chess career
- Country: Chile
- Title: Woman International Master (2017)
- Peak rating: 2266 (October 2023)

Javiera Belén Gómez Barrera (born 2002) is a Chilean chess player. She was awarded the title of Woman International Master title by FIDE in 2017.

== Career ==
She won the Women's Chilean Chess Championship in 2020.

She has represented Chile in the Chess Olympiad twice; in 2016 (where she scored 6½/10 on board two) and 2018.

She qualified for the Women's Chess World Cup 2021, where she was defeated 1½-½ by Irine Kharisma Sukandar in the first round.
