= Zara Majid =

Caymanian chess player (born 2010)

Personal information
- Born: 2010 (age 15–16) Trinidad and Tobago

Chess career
- Country: Cayman Islands
- Title: Woman Candidate Master (2024)
- Peak rating: 1738 (October 2026)

Zara Majid is a Caymanian chess player, student, and youth advocate who was awarded the title of Woman Candidate Master by the International Chess Federation (FIDE) in 2024. She was a member of the Cayman Islands women’s team at the 45th Chess Olympiad, which was held in Budapest, Hungary. At the chess tournament, the Cayman Islands team secured a silver medal in their category.

In 2026, Majid was awarded a full scholarship to attend the Yale Young Global Scholars programme at Yale University, where she was selected to participate in the Solving Global Challenges programme.

== Early life and education ==
Majid was born in Trinidad and Tobago but moved to the Cayman Islands as a young child. She previously attended Gandhi Memorial Vedic School in Aranjuez, Trinidad, and then Cayman International School in the Cayman Islands.

In addition to completing her education, Majid has become involved in science and academic activities in the Cayman Islands. In 2026, she was awarded a scholarship to the Yale Young Global Scholars programme out of a pool of over 14,400 applicants from over 150 different countries. The publication of the Caymanian Times reported that Majid was awarded to the Solving Global Challenges track of the Yale Young Global Scholars programme, which investigates different global challenges and solutions to those challenges.

== Chess career ==
Majid represents the Cayman Islands Chess Federation in FIDE-rated competition. Her FIDE profile lists her as belonging to the Cayman Islands and to having attained the title of Woman Candidate Master in 2024.

In September 2024, Majid was selected to play for the Cayman Islands representative team in the women’s category for the 45th FIDE Chess Olympiad in Budapest, Hungary. The team included players Laia Swaminathan, Melinda Suico, Zara Majid, Anvita Niranjan Patil, and reserve player Abbie McClenaghan. Following the tournament, Cayman Compass published an article stating that the Cayman Islands women’s team had earned a silver medal in their class at the competition, and that its three team members, Majid, Swaminathan, and Suico, had earned qualifications for the title of Woman Candidate Master.

At the 2025 Cayman Islands National Junior Championships, Majid successfully defended her title as the Female National Junior Champion and also won the Under-16 Girls chess title. Furthermore, the Cayman Independent referred to her as the National Female Chess Champion for the Cayman Islands.

== Chess outreach ==
Zara Majid has taken part in an international chess outreach programme through Checkmate Betul, a youth-led initiative that aims to introduce the game of chess to girls aged between 8 and 18 in the town of Betul, in the Indian state of Madhya Pradesh. Checkmate Betul works with around 100 girls from six schools across rural India, offering classes to them on a regular basis.

The initiative was featured in an article published by ChessBase India, which identified Majid as the 16-year-old Woman Candidate Master from the Cayman Islands who leads the initiative’s podcast and youth affairs channels. Another Indian news outlet, the Indian Express, identified Majid as one of the mentors behind the initiative, which delivers online chess lessons to schoolgirls in the town of Betul. Additionally, the Times of India also listed Majid as one of the international team members who are involved in the initiative.

== Youth leadership and environmental advocacy ==
Majid is also involved in several other initiatives within the Cayman Islands. For instance, the Cayman Independent reported that Majid volunteers with the National Trust for the Cayman Islands to participate in initiatives targeting youth and the environment, such as Protect Our Future. The Cayman Independent also reported that Majid is the leader of a Cayman Islands Chess Federation initiative targeting girls and introducing them to the game of chess, called Queens of Tomorrow.

Majid was also quoted in an article published by the BBC in 2025 regarding issues related to the management of waste within the Caribbean region. Majid was cited in the article in conjunction with her involvement with Protect Our Future and her comments regarding the Cayman Islands’ landfill area, known as “Mount Trashmore”. Majid stated in the article that the Cayman Islands’ environment was essential for both its people and economy based upon tourism.

In 2025, Majid was also named by the Cayman News Service as one of the youth activists in connection with the Protect Our Future initiative in relation to the Cayman Islands’ referendum on cruise ship berthing at the Cayman Islands port.

== Awards and recognition ==
In 2025, Majid won the outstanding speaker award in the RBC Young Leaders Programme. Additionally, she was the second runner-up in the Cayman Islands Youth Parliament competition , on the government side at the Cayman Islands Youth Parliament awards ceremony.
