= Natalia Edzgveradze =

Georgian chess player

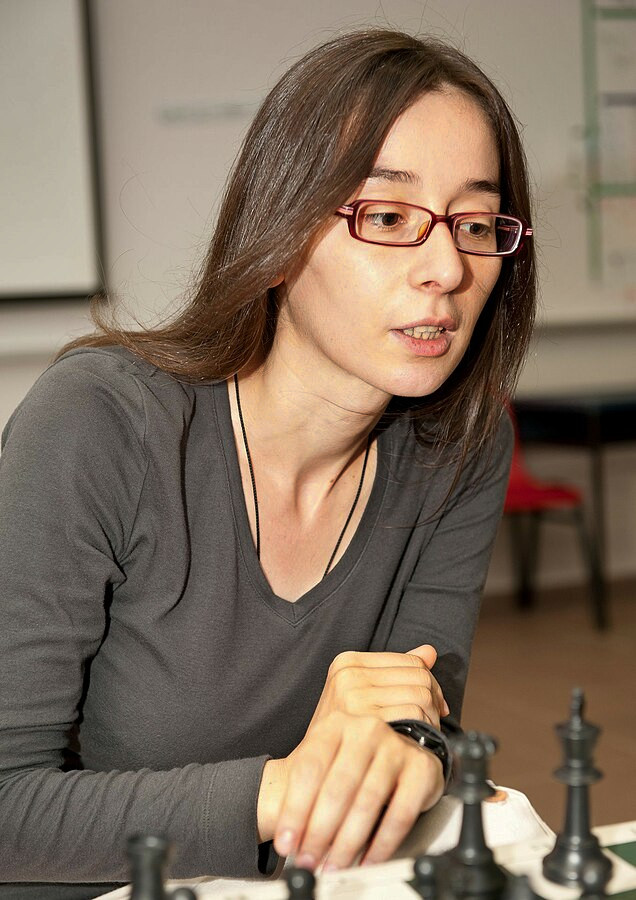

Personal information
- Born: July 23, 1975 (age 51)

Chess career
- Country: Georgia
- Title: Woman Grandmaster (1999)
- Peak rating: 2355 (January 1997)

Natalia Edzgveradze (born 23 July 1975) is a Georgian chess Woman Grandmaster and FIDE Trainer since 2005 (World Chess Federation certified trainer), currently working in Georgia as deputy director of Maia Chiburdanidze Chess Academy (Chess Queen Academy). Natalia is a coach with almost 20 years of experience.

From 2005 to 2019 she worked as a chess coach in Singapore.

In 2019 she moved back to Georgia and joined Maya Chiburdanidze Chess Queen Academy.
