= Leya Garifullina =

Russian chess player (born 2004)

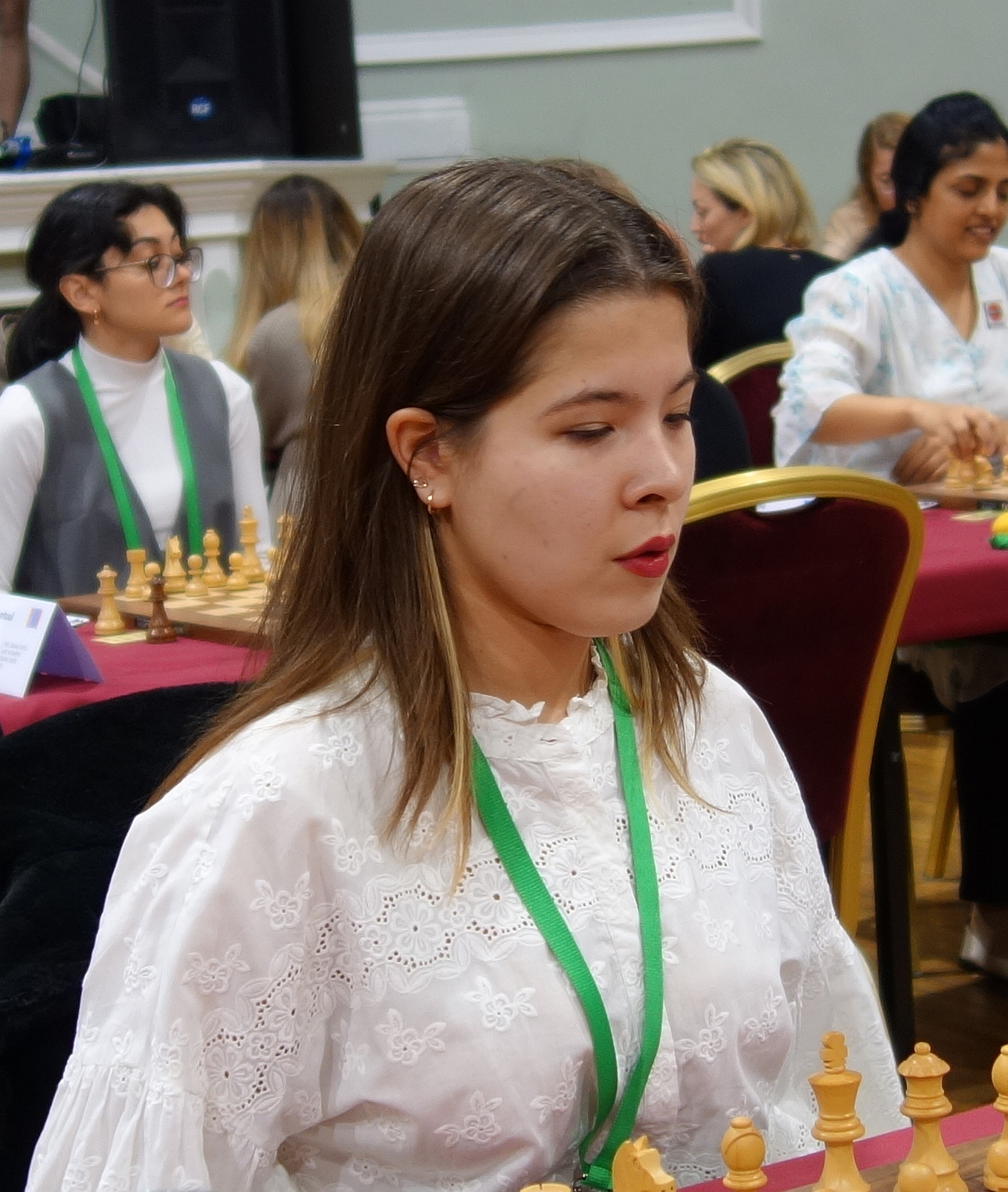
- Leya Garifullina at the FIDE Grand Swiss 2023

Personal information
- Born: 5 November 2004 (age 21) Yekaterinburg, Russia

Chess career
- Country: Russia (until 2023); FIDE (since 2023)
- Title: International Master (2022); Woman Grandmaster (2020)
- FIDE rating: 2423 (July 2026)
- Peak rating: 2477 (August 2025)

Leya Rafisovna Garifullina (born 5 November 2004) is a Russian chess player who holds the titles International Master (IM) and Woman Grandmaster (WGM).

== Chess career ==
She won the Girls Under-16 World Championship in 2019 in Bombay with 8.5 points out of 11. She tied for third in the Russian Women's Chess championship in December 2020.

She qualified for the Women's Chess World Cup 2021, where she beat Zenia Corrales Jiménez in the first round, upset Olga Girya in the second round, and was defeated by Polina Shuvalova in the third round.
