= Gabriela Vargas =

Paraguayan chess player (born 1988)

Personal information
- Born: November 12, 1988 (age 37)

Chess career
- Country: Paraguay
- Title: Woman International Master (2019)
- Peak rating: 2196 (October 2024)

Gabriela Vargas Talavera (born 1988) is a Paraguayan chess player. She was awarded the title of Woman International Master by FIDE in 2019.

She is a computer scientist by profession.

== Chess career ==
She has represented Paraguay in the Women's Chess Olympiad, including:

- 2008, where she scored 8½/10 on board one.
- 2010, scoring 6½/11 on board one.
- 2012, scoring 6/11 on board one.
- 2014, scoring 6/10 on board one.
- 2016, scoring 7½/11 on board one.

She finished first in the Montevideo Zonal 2.5 to qualify for the Women's Chess World Cup 2021, where she was defeated 2-0 by Elina Danielian in the first round.
