= Anahí Ortiz Verdezoto =

Ecuadorian chess player (born 2001)

Personal information
- Born: 2001 (age 24–25)

Chess career
- Country: Ecuador
- Title: Woman International Master (2019)
- Peak rating: 2248 (June 2025)

Anahi Eduarda Ortiz Verdezoto (born 2001), is an Ecuadorian chess player. She was awarded the title of Woman International Master in 2019.

== Chess career ==
She qualified for the Women's Chess World Cup 2021, where she was defeated 2-0 by Ekaterina Atalik in the first round.
