= Viktoria Radeva =

Bulgarian chess player (born 2001)

Personal information
- Born: 15 May 2001 (age 25)

Chess career
- Country: Bulgaria
- Title: Woman Grandmaster (2021)
- Peak rating: 2372 (August 2021)

Viktoria Radeva (Bulgarian: Виктория Радева; born 15 May 2001) is a Bulgarian chess player. She was awarded the title of Woman Grandmaster by FIDE in 2021.

== Chess career ==
In 2011, Radeva won silver at the U-10 World Youth Chess Championship.

She won the Bulgarian Women's Chess Championship in 2018, 2019 and 2023.

She qualified to play in the Women's Chess World Cup 2021, where she was defeated 2–0 by Tatev Abrahamyan in the first round.
