= Penelope Drastik =

Australian chess player (born 1997)

Personal information
- Born: 1997 (age 28–29)

Chess career
- Country: Australia
- Peak rating: 1905 (March 2024)

Penelope Drastik (born 1997) is an Australian chess player.

== Chess career ==
Drastik qualified for the Women's Chess World Cup 2021, where she was defeated 1½-½ by Marie Sebag in the first round.

== Education ==
As of 2021, Drastik is studying Advanced Maths at the University of Wollongong.
