= Louisa Matilda Fagan =

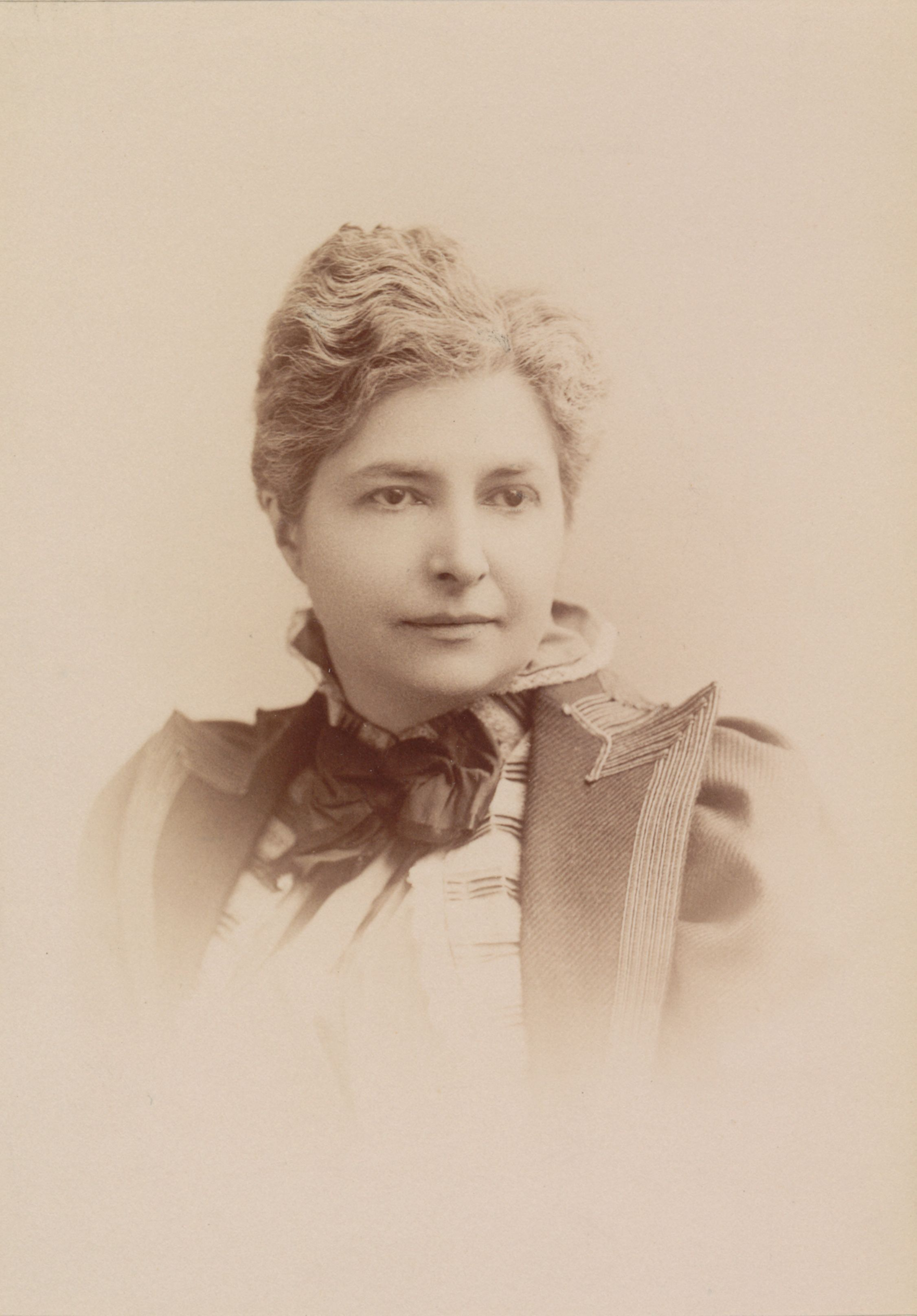
Mrs. Louisa Fagan (1897)

Louisa Matilda Fagan (née Ballard) (9 January 1850, Naples, Kingdom of the Two Sicilies – 11 August 1931, London) was an Italian–British female chess master.

Ballard learned to play chess as a child from her father William who married Angela De Deo in Naples in 1847. She eventually married an Irishman, J.G. Fagan who was an officer with the Bombay Lancers, and as a result, the Fagans lived for a period of time in British India. Fagan was part of the chess scene in India, and has some of her problems published in The City of London Chess Magazine.

Fagan became an emancipation activist, and was one of the founding members of the Ladies' Chess Club of London, which boasted 100 members at its peak and lasted until after World War I. She took 2nd place, behind Mary Rudge, in the first Ladies’ International Chess Congress held at the club in London from June 22 to July 3, 1897.

She was the younger sister of William Robert Ballard, born in Naples in 1848, a strong London chess player in the late 19th, early 20th century.
