= Alina l'Ami =

Romanian chess player (born 1985)

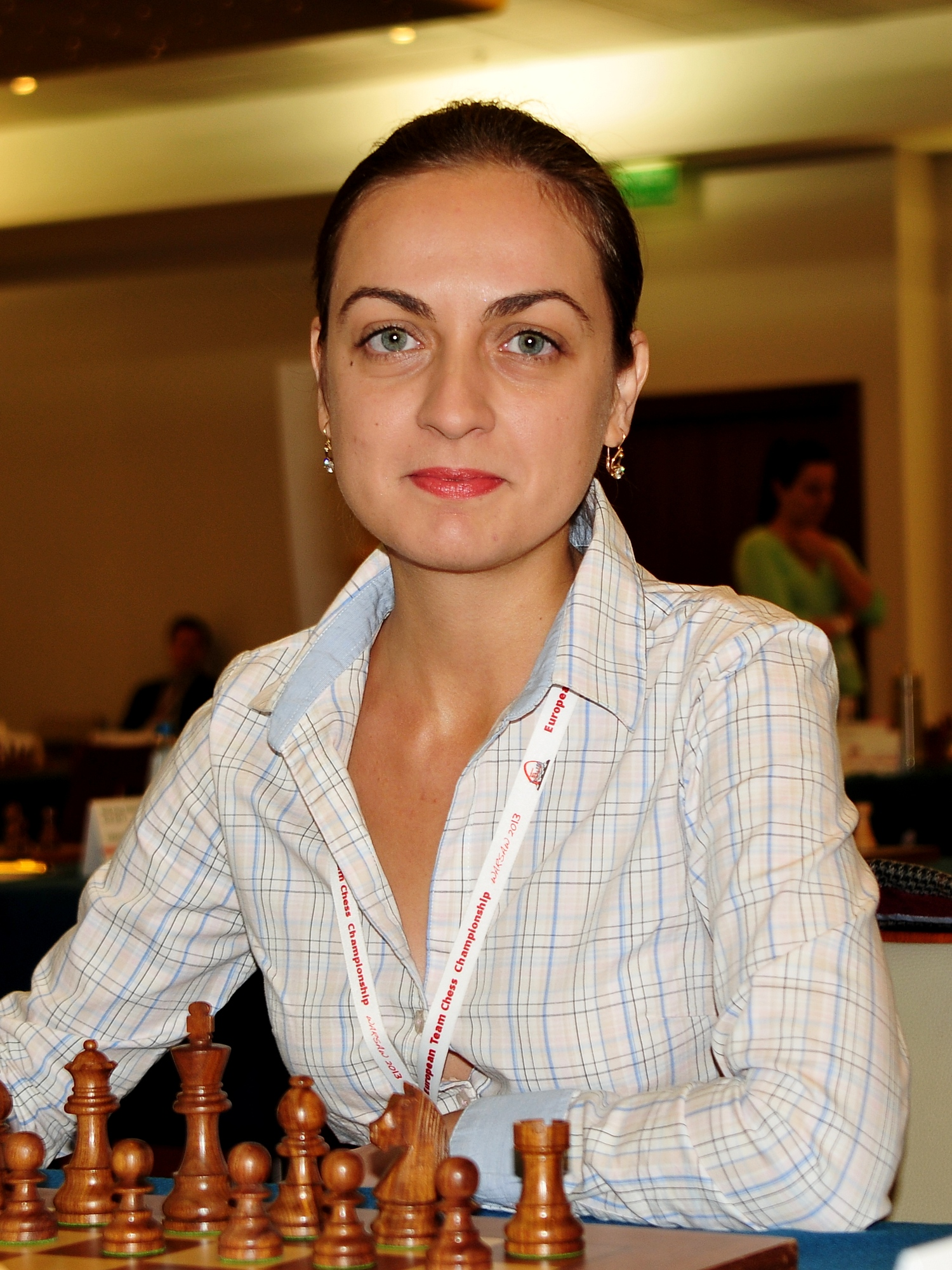
- L'Ami at the European Team Chess Championship in 2013

Personal information
- Born: 1 June 1985 (age 41) Iași, Romania
- Education: Alexandru Ioan Cuza University
- Spouse: Erwin l'Ami

Chess career
- Country: Romania
- Title: International Master (2014); Woman Grandmaster (2006)
- FIDE rating: 2285 (July 2022)
- Peak rating: 2446 (August 2014)

Alina l'Ami (née Moţoc; born 1 June 1985 in Iași) is a Romanian chess player, She holds the titles of International Master (IM) and Woman Grandmaster (WGM).

She won the under-10 girls' division of the World Youth Chess Championship in 1995 and the under-18 girls' section of the European Youth Chess Championship in 2002. Also in 2002, l'Ami won the Women's Balkan Individual Championship in Istanbul. In 2013, she jointly won, with Sophie Milliet, the Women's Grandmaster Tournament of the 8th Japfa Chess Festival in Jakarta, Indonesia. The following year, l'Ami took part in the Sharjah stage of the FIDE Women's Grand Prix 2013–14.

In the Netherlands she first played chess at the Hilversum Chess Society, and since 2011 at En Passant in Bunschoten-Spakenburg.

L'Ami graduated cum laude in Psychology from the Alexandru Ioan Cuza University in Iași. She is married to Dutch chess grandmaster Erwin l'Ami.
