= Hoang Thanh Trang =

Vietnamese-Hungarian chess grandmaster (born 1980)

Hoàng Thanh Trang
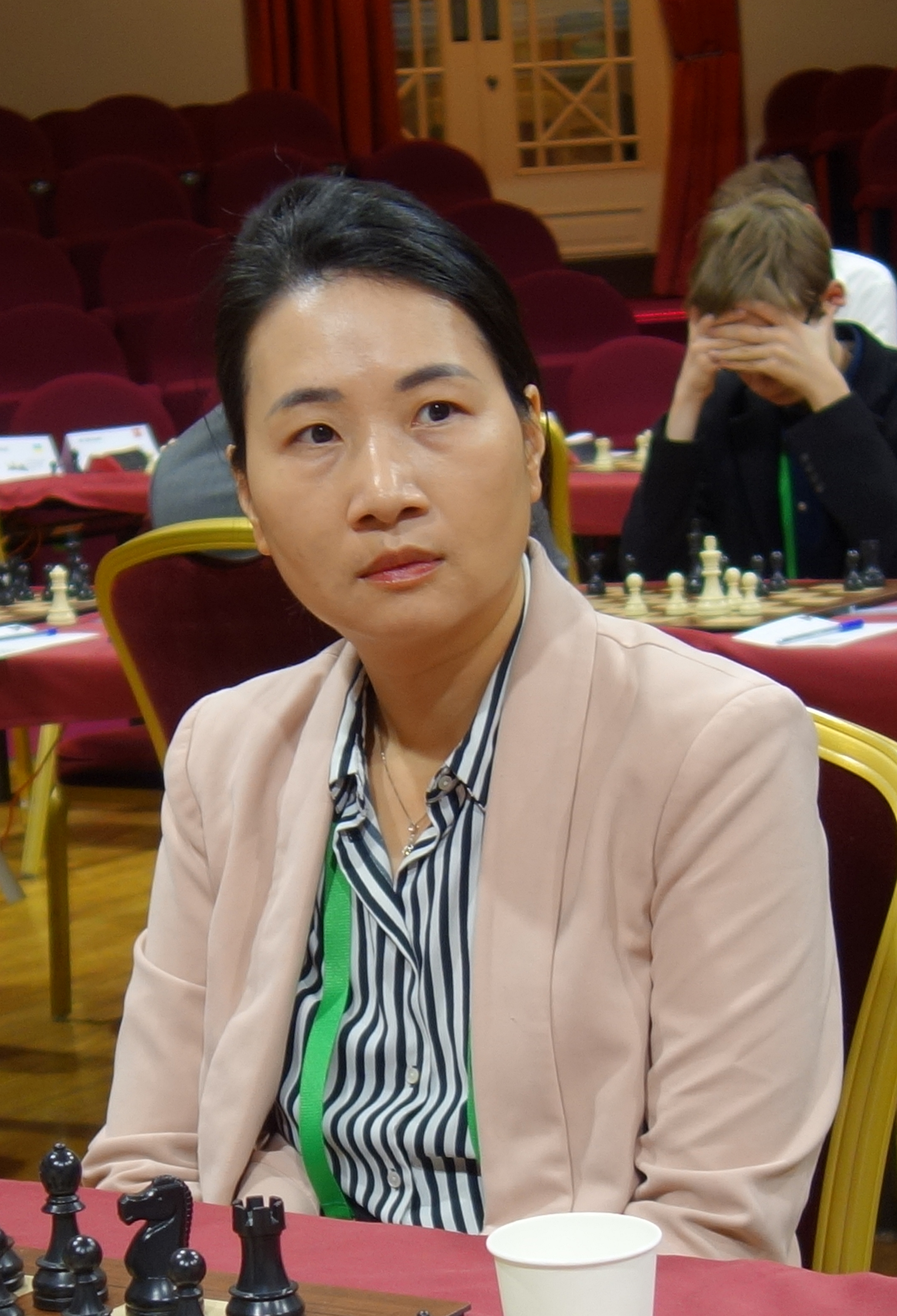
- Hoàng Thanh Trang in 2023

Personal information
- Born: 25 April 1980 (age 46) Hanoi, Vietnam

Chess career
- Country: Vietnam (until 2006); Hungary (since 2006)
- Title: Grandmaster (2007)
- Peak rating: 2511 (November 2013)

Hoàng Thanh Trang (born 25 April 1980) is a Vietnamese-Hungarian chess grandmaster. She was Asian women's champion in 2000 and European women's champion in 2013. Hoang competed in the Women's World Chess Championship in 2000, 2001, 2004, 2008, 2010, 2012, 2015, 2017 and 2018.

== Early life and career ==
Born in Hanoi, Vietnam, Hoàng Thanh Trang moved with her family to Budapest when she was ten years old. She was taught how to play chess at four and half years old by her father, who is her coach.

Thanh Trang played in the 1995 Women's Interzonal Tournament in Chișinău. She won the World Girls U-20 Championship in 1998. In 2000, she won Asian Women's Championship in Udaipur. She won the gold medal as the best player on board 1 at the 2005 European Club Cup for Women in Saint-Vincent, Aosta Valley, with a score of 80.0%. The following year she transferred national federations from Vietnam to Hungary. In 2007, she became Grandmaster; the twelfth woman to reach that rank.

In 2011, she won the European Women's Rapid Championship (Maia Chiburdanidze's Cup) in Kutaisi. In 2013 Hoang won the European Women's Championship, winning 7 games and drawing 4, ending up with a score of 9 points from 11 games.

She has competed at ten Women's Chess Olympiads, five for Vietnam (1994–2002) and five for Hungary (2006–2014).

== Personal life ==
Thanh Trang bears dual citizenship of Vietnam and Hungary. She graduated in Economics from the Gábor Dénes College.

Awards and achievements
Preceded by Xu Yuhua	Women's Asian Chess Champion; 2000	Succeeded by Li Ruofan
