= Lisandra Teresa Ordaz Valdés =

Cuban chess player (born 1988)

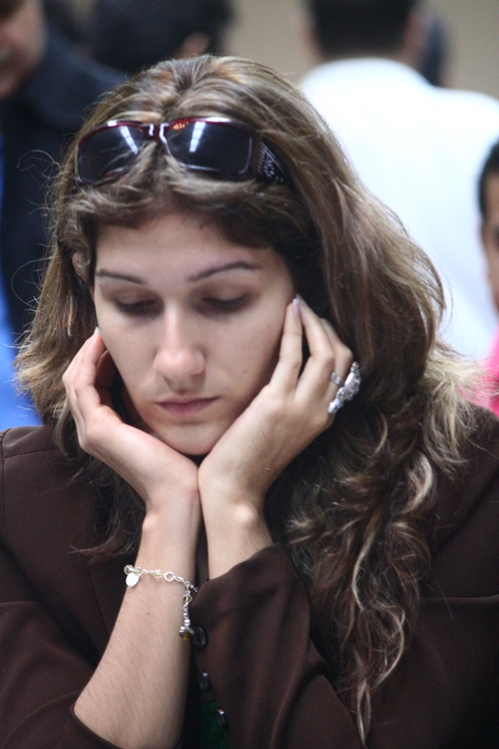
- Ordaz in 2011

Personal information
- Born: 25 November 1988 (age 37) Pinar del Río, Cuba

Chess career
- Country: Cuba
- Title: International Master (2018); Woman Grandmaster (2011)
- Peak rating: 2415 (June 2018)

Lisandra Teresa Ordaz Valdés (born 25 November 1988) is a Cuban chess player, Woman Grandmaster (WGM 2011), and International Master (IM 2018).

== Biography ==
In March 2003, in Pinar del Río, Ordaz won the International Chess tournament XXI. Hermanos Saíz Memorial. In April 2004 in Santa Clara she ranked 2nd behind Maritza Arribas Robaina in the Cuban Subzone Chess Tournament. In October 2006, in Guatemala City Ordaz Valdés won the Central American Junior Chess Championship in U20 girls' age group. In Cuban Women's Chess Championship she won silver (2008) and bronze (2011) medals.

Ordaz played for Cuba in the Women's Chess Olympiads:

- In 2008, at second board in the 38th Chess Olympiad (women) in Dresden (+4, =5, -1),
- In 2010, at first board in the 39th Chess Olympiad (women) in Khanty-Mansiysk (+3, =7, -1),
- In 2012, at first board in the 40th Chess Olympiad (women) in Istanbul (+4, =4, -2),
- In 2014, at first board in the 41st Chess Olympiad (women) in Tromsø (+2, =7, -1),
- In 2018, at first board in the 43rd Chess Olympiad (women) in Batumi (+2, =3, -4).

In 2004, Ordaz was awarded the FIDE Woman International Master (WIM) title and received the FIDE Woman Grandmaster (WGM) in 2011. In 2014, she became a FIDE Trainer (FT). In 2018, she became a FIDE International Master (IM).
