= Irina Bulmaga =

Moldovan-Romanian chess player (born 1993)

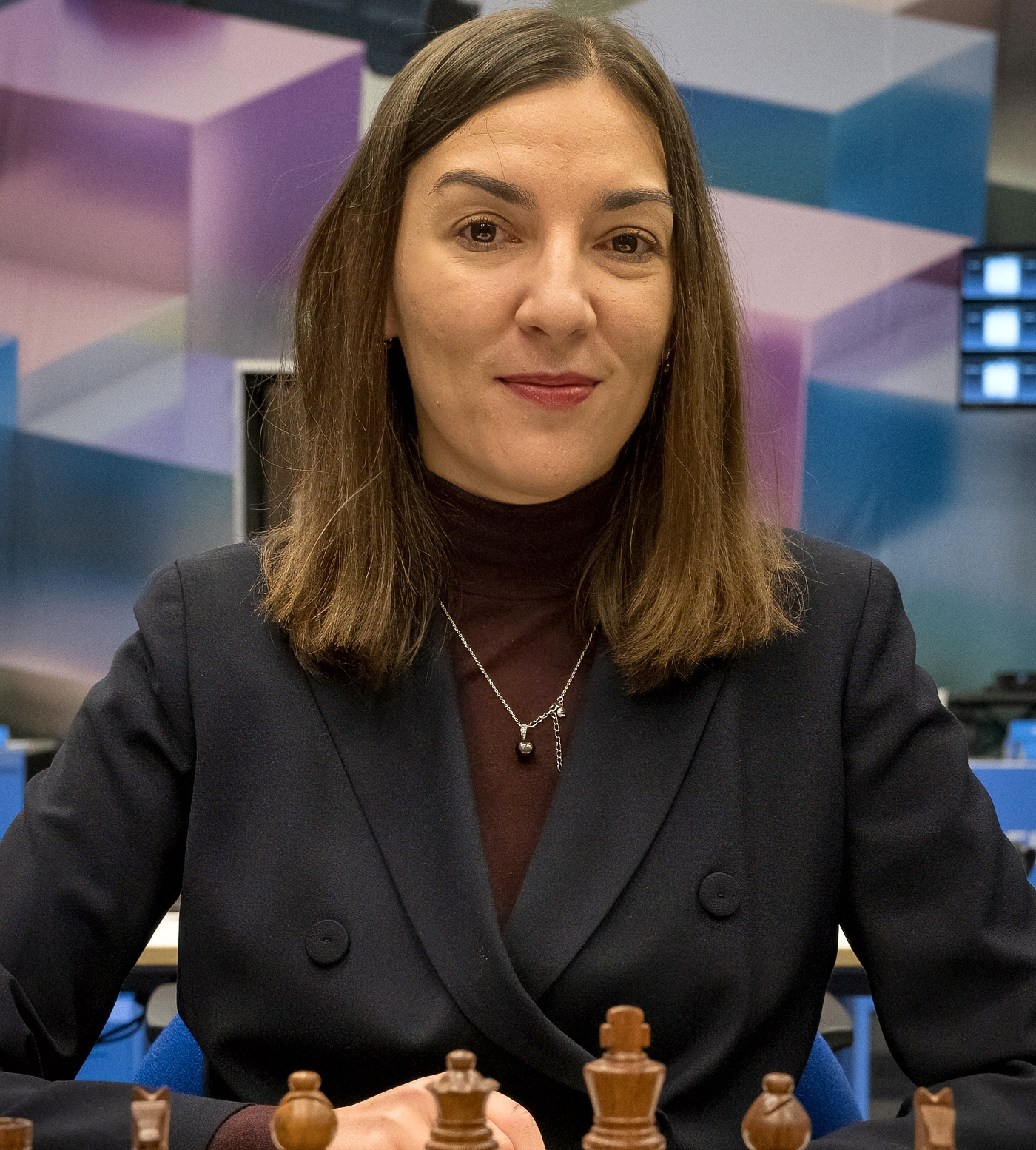
- Bulmaga in 2025

Personal information
- Born: 11 November 1993 (age 32) Chișinău, Moldova

Chess career
- Country: Moldova (until 2009); Romania (since 2009)
- Title: International Master (2013); Woman Grandmaster (2012)
- Peak rating: 2453 (February 2020)

Irina Bulmaga (born 11 November 1993) is a Moldovan and Romanian chess player. She received the FIDE titles of Woman Grandmaster (WGM) in 2012 and International Master (IM) in 2013.

== Biography ==
Between 2001 and 2009 she won multiple Moldovan Girls' Chess Championships in various age categories. She won the 1st place among Girls at the World Schools Chess Championships in 2005, 2006 and 2007. In 2007 and 2008 she won the Moldovan Women's Chess Championship.

Since 2009 she has represented Romania. Between 2010 and 2013 she became Romania's Girls' under 18 Champion at classical chess, rapid, blitz and solving and 3 times Romania's Girls U20 Champion.

In 2010 she won for the first time the Romanian Women's Blitz and Rapid Chess Championships. Up until 2024, she won 6 more national titles in Rapid Chess (2015, 2016, 2018, 2022, 2023, 2024) and one more in Blitz (2016). Irina got 4 national titles in Solving (2014, 2016, 2018, 2022). She became European Champion among Women in Solving in 2015. In classical chess, she became 2 times runner up at the National Women's Championship (2011, 2017) and won the title in 2018.

She has represented Romania at eight Chess Olympiads (2010, 2012, 2014, 2016, 2018, 2020, 2022, 2024), winning an individual bronze medal in 2014, and at seven European Chess Championship between teams (2011–2023). Also, she has represented Romania at the Women's World Team Championship 2013.

She has won the Sharjah Cup for Women (UAE) in 2018 and 2020 and the 1st Hail International Rapid Chess Tournament for Women in Saudi Arabia (2019).

In 2020, she won the FEDA WGM tournament in La Palma Island scoring 9 points out of 9. In 2022 she won the 1st Capablanca Memorial among Women in Havana, Cuba.

She has also won the 1st prize among women at many strong chess opens all over the world, among them: Paleochora Open, Greece (2016, 2020, 2021, 2022), Cap d'Agde Open, France (2014,2016), Portugal Open (2018), RTU Open, Riga, Latvia (2019), Chessable Sunway Sitges Open, Spain (2022) and many others.

She participated in multiple European Women's Individual Chess Championships in classical chess (2005, 2006, 2008, 2009, 2011–2014, 2016–2019, 2021–2025), her best results being the 2nd place in 2025.

She participated in the Women's World Cup twice- in 2021, in Sochi, Russia and in 2023- in Baku, Azerbaijan, both times being eliminated in the 2nd round.

She was part of the silver medal winner club- "CSU ASE Superbet", playing on the 1st board at the European Women's Club Cup in Mayrhofen, Austria, 2022. In 2023, together with the same club- they became European Women's Club Cup winners in Durrës, Albania. In 2024, together with the "SuperChess" Club, they won the bronze medal at the European Women's Club Cup in Serbia.

Bulmaga won the silver medal at the 2025 European Women's Championship in Greece.

Since 2012 she has constantly been in the FIDE Top 100 rated Women in the world and since December 2016 up to this day- the 1st rated Woman in Romania.

Her sister, Elena Bulmaga, also is a chess player.

== FIDE ratings ==
Elo development
View chart definition.
