= Pauline Guichard =

French chess player

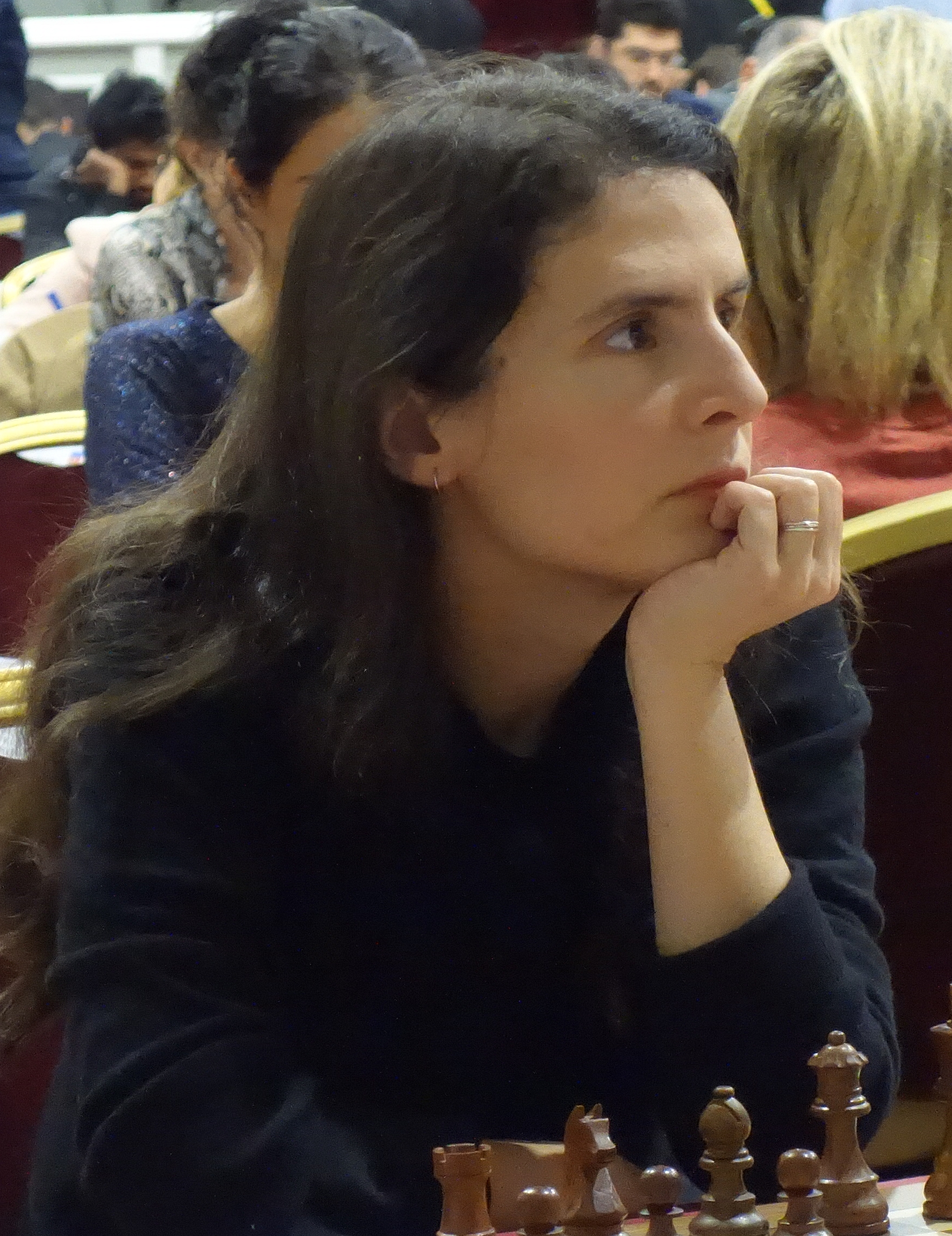
- Guichard in 2023

Personal information
- Born: 14 November 1988 (age 37) Colombes, France

Chess career
- Country: France
- Title: International Master (2019); Woman Grandmaster (2011)
- Peak rating: 2430 (May 2019)

Pauline Guichard (born 14 November 1988, in Colombes) is a French chess player and an International Master. She won the Women's section of the 2018 and 2019 French Chess Championship.

She participated in the 2010 Chess Olympiad in Khanty-Mansiysk, the 2014 Chess Olympiad, and the 2018 Chess Olympiad.
