= Olga Badelka =

Belarusian chess player (born 2002)

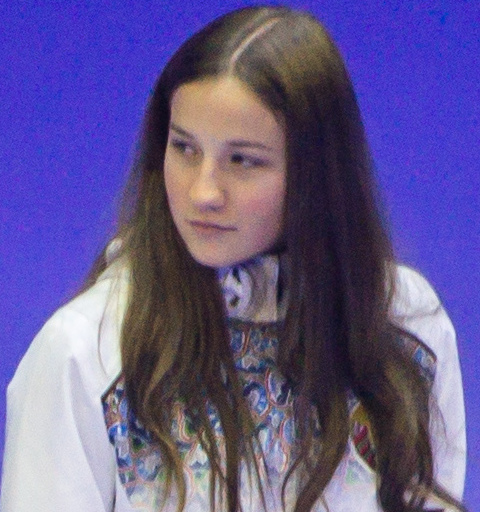
- Badelka at the Chess Olympiad 2016

Personal information
- Born: 8 July 2002 (age 24) Mogilev, Belarus

Chess career
- Country: Belarus (until 2021); Russia (2021–2023); FIDE (2023–2025); Austria (since 2025)
- Title: International Master (2019); Woman Grandmaster (2019)
- FIDE rating: 2416 (August 2026)
- Peak rating: 2453 (December 2021)

Olga Badelka (Belarusian: Вольга Бадэлька, Russian: Ольга Баделько; born 8 July 2002) is a Belarusian chess player, currently playing for Austria, who holds the FIDE title of International Master (IM, 2019). In 2021, she was on the chess team of the University of Missouri in the United States. As of 2022, Badelka now plays chess full-time.

== Biography ==
Olga Badelka is multiple winner of Belarusian Youth Chess Championships for girls in different age groups: U16 (2017), U18 (2017), U20 (2016).

She repeatedly represented Belarus at the European Youth Chess Championships and World Youth Chess Championships in different age groups, where she won five medals: gold (in 2017, at the European Youth Chess Championship in the U16 girls age group), three silver (in 2012, at the World Youth Chess Championship in the U10 girls age group, and in 2018, at the European Youth Chess Championship in the U16 girls age group, and in 2019, at the European Youth Chess Championship in the U18 girls age group) and bronze (in 2014, at the World Youth Chess Championship in the U12 girls age group). In 2013, Badelka won World School Chess Championship in the U11 girls age group. She four time played for Belarus in World Youth U16 Chess Olympiads (2014–2017).

In 2017, in Riga, Badelka participated in the Women's European Individual Chess Championship.

Badelka played for Belarus in the Women's Chess Olympiads:

- In 2016, at third board in the 42nd Chess Olympiad (women) in Baku (+5, =3, -2),
- In 2018, at first board in the 43rd Chess Olympiad (women) in Batumi (+3, =5, -1).

In 2017, she received the FIDE Woman International Master (WIM) title. She received the International Master (IM) and Woman Grandmaster (WGM) titles in 2019.

In 2021, Badelka played the Bongcloud (doubled but not drawn) against Magnus Carlsen during a blitz event. Carlsen dubbed the move "...very silly and a little bit legendary...".

In 2021, she entered the University of Missouri in the United States, joining the university's chess team and majoring in linguistics.
