= Svane =

Svane is a surname. Notable people with the surname include:

- Frederik Svane (born 2004), German chess grandmaster
- Hans Svane (1606–1668), Danish statesman and ecclesiastic
- Randall Svane (born 1955), American composer
- Rasmus Svane (born 1997), Danish-German chess grandmaster
- Troels Svane (born 1965), Danish cellist
- Mads Svane (born 2002), Danish handball player

== See also ==
- Bishop Hans Svane’s 1647 Revision of Bishop Hans Poulsen Resen’s Translation of 1607
- Neka mi ne svane Marija Magdalena (1999) ► "Neka mi ne svane" ("May the dawn never come") was the Croatian entry in the Eurovision Song Contest 1998, performed in Croatian by Danijela
