= Dinara Wagner =

Russian-German chess player (born 1999)

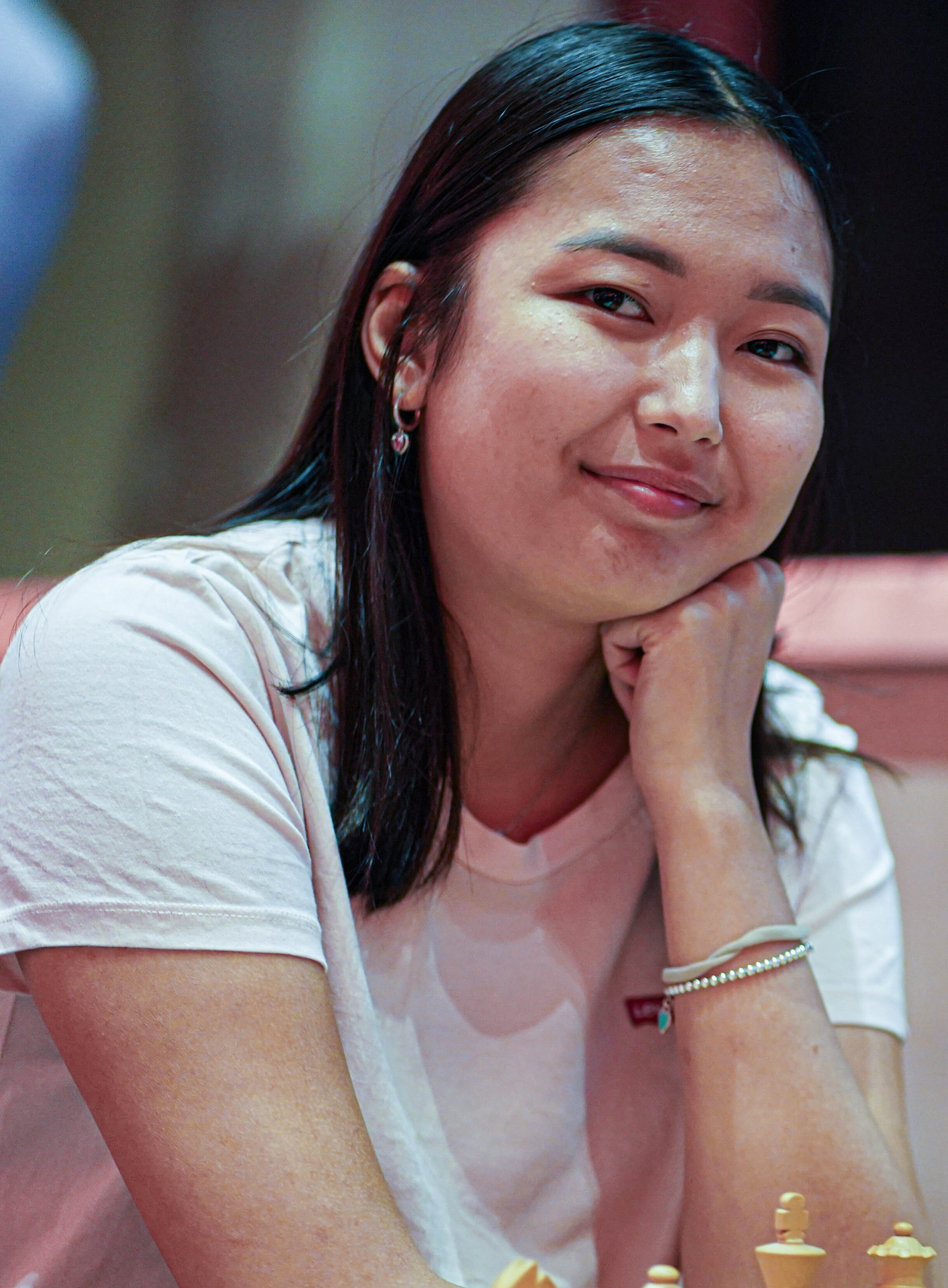
- Wagner in 2023

Personal information
- Born: 25 May 1999 (age 27) Elista, Kalmykia, Russia
- Spouse: Dennis Wagner (m. 2022)

Chess career
- Country: Russia (until 2022); FIDE (2022); Germany (since 2022)
- Title: International Master (2023); Woman Grandmaster (2020)
- FIDE rating: 2409 (July 2026)
- Peak rating: 2468 (August 2023)

Dinara Wagner (née Dordzhieva; (Note: Russian: Динара Мергеновна Дорджиева, romanized: Dinara Mergenovna Dordzhieva) born 25 May 1999) is a Russian chess player representing Germany. Until 2022, she played for the Chess Federation of Russia. In 2023 she won the final leg of the Women's Grand Prix as the lowest rated player in the field. Since 2020, she holds the title Woman Grandmaster (WGM), since 2023 she holds the title of International Master.

== Biography ==
Wagner is from Elista, the capital of the Republic of Kalmykia. During her childhood, she won the Russian Junior Chess Championships for girls five times. Since 2014, she holds the title Woman International Master and in 2016 she came in third at the World Girls Junior Championship where WGM Dinara Saduakassova and WIM P. V. Nandhidhaa won the first and second positions respectively. She was the best female player at the 2019 European Rapid Chess Championships, and the following year she achieved the title Woman Grandmaster.

At the Higher School of Economics in Moscow, Wagner studied the world economy, graduating in 2020 with a bachelor's degree. She then moved to Heidelberg and started a master's degree in economics at Ruprecht-Karls University. In 2022, she married fellow chess player Dennis Wagner.

== 2022 ==
=== German Masters ===
After the beginning of Russian invasion of Ukraine in 2022, Wagner left the Chess Federation of Russia and temporarily played under the FIDE flag, before joining the German Chess Federation in May 2022. In the same year she won the Women's German Masters tournament. This win earned her Germany's invitation (as co-organizer) to the FIDE Women's Grand Prix 2022–23, part of the Women's World Championship cycle 2023–2025.

=== Women's Grand Prix 2022–23 ===
Wagner started the series as by far the lowest ranked player, almost 100 Elo below her next nearest competitor, and more than 200 behind the highest-rated, Aleksandra Goryachkina.

==== Astana and first IM norm ====
The Astana tournament started badly for Wagner with two consecutive losses. Her play generally in Astana was marked by time trouble, but she recovered with a series of draws, and two wins versus Kosteniuk and Kashlinskaya (this last, her favorite game at the tournament). After Kosteniuk utilized the Grand Prix Attack against her Sicilian Defense, Wagner said that before the game, she thought, "'Ha! It would be funny if someone played the Grand Prix during the Grand Prix', but unfortunately I didn't prepare it". She spent 30 minutes on move eight of that game.

There were late tournament losses to Kateryna Lagno and Tan Zhongyi, but a last round win over Shuvalova secured her a first International Master norm and a share of 6th (of 12).

== 2023 ==
=== Setbacks in Munich ===
In the Munich leg, Wagner finished 12th of 12. Michael Rahal's report notes that she "only slightly underperformed with respect to her rating (-5 points)".

=== Victory in Nicosia and first GM norm ===
In the final leg of the Women's Grand Prix in Nicosia, Wagner finished in clear first with 7/11, including victories over Goryachkina and Lagno. She also achieved her second IM norm and her first Grandmaster norm. When asked what she planned to do with her winnings, she said that in Munich, she told herself, "'If I will play well, I will go to one of the stores and buy a designer bag'… so I think I will buy myself something nice!"

=== Sportland NRW Cup ===
To mark the 50th anniversary of the Sparkassen Chess Meeting in Dortmund in June, the event continued as a festival of chess called the 50th International Dortmund Chess Days, with a number of concurrent events such as the No Castling Masters, won by Caruana, a large open event, won by Donchencko, and the Sportland NRW Cup, in which Wagner participated.

With a new peak rating due to her exploits in Nicosia, Wagner started ranked fourth by rating, behind grandmasters from India, Uzbekistan and Israel. She began with two consecutive wins against grandmaster opponents, and finished in clear first with 7/9, the only player to go unbeaten throughout the tournament. In the last round, "In a better position, I offered a draw and secured the tournament win". A performance rating of 2643 against this strong international opposition meant that Wagner also secured her second GM norm and final IM norm.

=== German titles and European team competition ===
Dinara Wagner became German Women Blitz champion in July with no draws, one loss and 25 wins. In August, Wagner's team Superchess won the women's European Chess Club Cup. Wagner was one of the "heroes of the day" with a final round victory as Superchess clinched the cup. She ended the year successfully defending her Women's German Masters crown in December.

== FIDE ratings ==
Elo development
View chart definition.
