= List of female chess grandmasters =

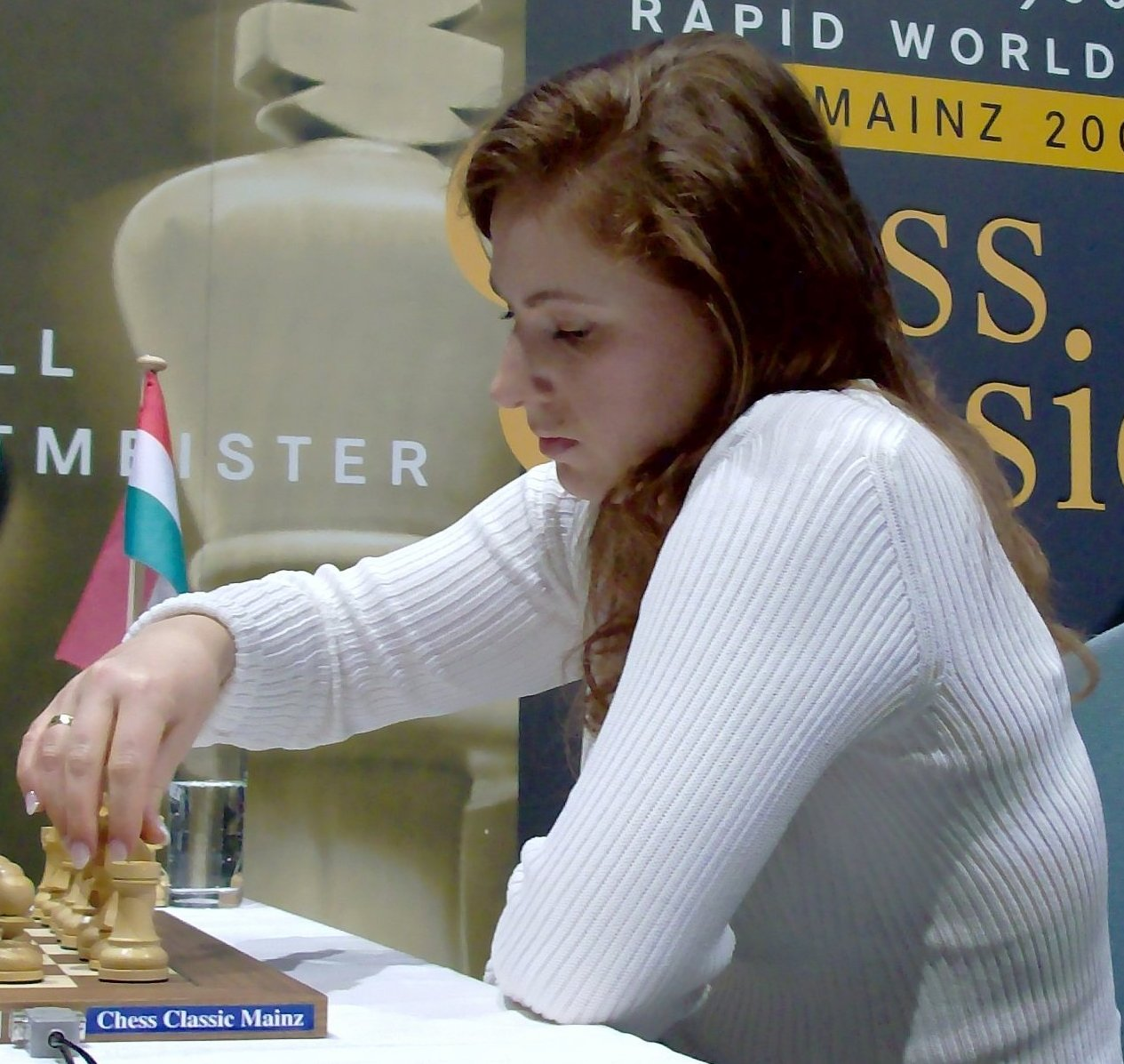
Judit Polgár, the highest-rated female player in history, was once the youngest grandmaster overall.

There are 44 female chess players who hold the title of Grandmaster (GM), the highest title awarded by the International Chess Federation (FIDE). The Grandmaster title was formally established by FIDE in 1950. Modern regulations typically require players to achieve a FIDE rating of 2500 and three tournament norms that include a GM-level performance rating of 2600 to be awarded the title, although there are various exceptions. Since 1993, players who win the Women's World Championship are directly awarded the Grandmaster title. Like all FIDE titles, the Grandmaster title is awarded for life and does not require a player to maintain a performance level or remain active after the award.

Nona Gaprindashvili, a Soviet chess player from Georgia, was the first woman to become a grandmaster in 1978, receiving the title largely by virtue of being the first woman to achieve a GM norm a year earlier. In 1991, Susan Polgar became the first woman to achieve the Grandmaster title through the required number of tournament norms. Later that year at age 15, her younger sister Judit Polgár became the youngest grandmaster in history, breaking the previous record set by Bobby Fischer. Although there were only six female grandmasters by 2000 and the number of female grandmasters has never been more than a few percent of the total, the turn of the century saw a substantial increase in the number of women to be awarded the title. This increase in the number of grandmasters has made it possible to stage women-only round-robin tournaments such as FIDE Women's Grand Prix events that feature predominantly grandmasters. At the same time, in an era where the Grandmaster title is no longer indicative of the upper echelon of chess overall, Hou Yifan has been the only player since 2000 to join Judit Polgár and Maia Chiburdanidze as female grandmasters who have been ranked in the top 100 among all players.

As of 2026, all female grandmasters are alive, and the vast majority who obtained the title since 2000 are still active. China and Russia have had the most female grandmasters, and seven countries have had more than one. Nearly all female grandmasters are from Europe or Asia, and Irina Krush of the United States is the only one from another continent. Judit Polgár's record for the youngest female grandmaster was beaten in 2002 by Koneru Humpy and was lowered again in 2008 by Hou Yifan, who became a grandmaster at age 14. Beyond the players who hold the GM title, there are over 400 additional women who have achieved the separate Woman Grandmaster (WGM) title, which has different requirements. (Note: Elsewhere in this article, the term "grandmaster" only refers to players who have achieved the GM title, and not in particular to those who have achieved the WGM title. Most women with the GM title also have the WGM title.)

== Background ==
=== Birth of the Grandmaster title ===
The International Chess Federation (FIDE) was established in 1924 as the governing body of competitive chess. At the time, the term "grandmaster" was already being informally used to describe the world's leading chess players since the players competing in the Championship section of the Ostend 1907 chess tournament were referred to as "grandmasters" in reference to them all having previously won international tournaments. Separate from FIDE, the Soviet Union also designated their own grandmasters as early as 1927. Informal use of the term continued until 1950 when FIDE officially awarded the Grandmaster (GM) title to 27 of the world's top past and present players who were still alive, none of whom were women. Vera Menchik, who regularly competed against high-level male players and was the only Women's World Champion before that year, was not considered because she had already been killed in World War II.

FIDE first established formal criteria for the Grandmaster title in 1953. These criteria included precursors to the modern-day concept of norms in that the requirements depended on a player's score in a few individual tournaments with a specified percentage of titled players. FIDE modified these criteria to have GM norms (then called GM results) take into account a tournament's average rating of the competing players in 1970 when they first adopted an Elo rating system. No earlier than 1977, FIDE added a requirement that players must achieve a FIDE rating of 2450, a threshold that was later increased to the modern-day requirement of 2500. Modern GM norms that require a performance rating of 2600 are still based on a player's score, but instead depend on the average rating of the player's opponents rather than all of the players in the tournament.

=== Earliest female grandmasters ===
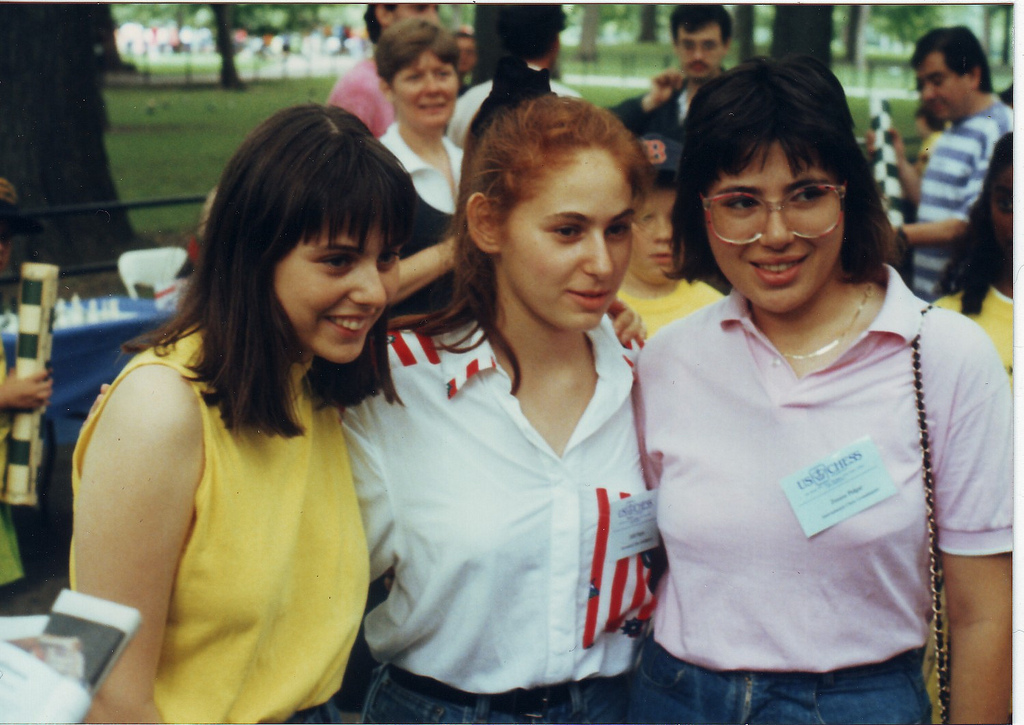
The Polgár sisters (pictured in 1988) all obtained GM norms before the age of 20. Susan (right) and Judit (center) both became grandmasters.

Beginning in the 1960s, Nona Gaprindashvili was the first woman since Menchik to be competitive against high-level male players. At the 1977 Lone Pine International after about 15 years as Women's World Champion, she became the first woman to achieve a GM norm. Gaprindashvili compiled a performance rating of 2647 and scored 6½/9 to finish in joint first with three others, including GMs Yuri Balashov and Oscar Panno. The following year, FIDE decided to directly award her the Grandmaster title because of that first norm and her other accomplishments, bypassing the typical requirement for players to have achieved two or three norms to earn the GM title. (Note: The previous year, FIDE had awarded the Grandmaster title to Rosendo Balinas even though he also only had one norm. The decision was made because he exceeded the required score in that norm and came within a ½ point of another norm at a different tournament. Gaprindashvili's situation was similar in that she had also missed another norm by a ½ point. The decision was also motivated by FIDE not wanting her to be affected by planned rule changes that would make it more difficult to complete the requirements in the future. The exact requirement to obtain the GM title through norms at the time was for players to have 24 games between all the tournaments where they earned GM norms. FIDE was planning to increase the number of required games to 30, as it had been before.) Maia Chiburdanidze succeeded her compatriot Gaprindashvili as Women's World Champion in 1978 and became the second woman to obtain the Grandmaster title in 1984 through her three World Championship match wins. Later on, she also became the first woman ranked in the top 100, peaking at No. 43 in 1988.

Following these first two female grandmasters from Georgia, back then still a part of the Soviet Union, the Polgár sisters ended the Soviet Union's four-decades-long domination over women's chess as all three sisters helped lead Hungary to the gold medal at the 1988 Women's Chess Olympiad and Susan Polgar had already become the top-rated female chess player in 1984 at age 15. Between 1988 and 1989, all three of Susan, Sofia, and Judit Polgár earned their first GM norms as teenagers in open tournaments in Royan, Rome, and Amsterdam respectively, the middle of which drew widespread attention because of Sofia's very high performance rating of around 2900, well above the norm requirement. Judit was also already ranked in the top 100 in 1989 at the age of 12, and later peaked at No. 8 in the world in 2003. In 1991, both Susan and Judit achieved the Grandmaster title. Susan was the third female grandmaster, and the first to earn the title with a complete set of GM norms based on performance rating and satisfying the rating requirement. Judit achieved her final GM norm as part of her victory in the open Hungarian Championship to become the fourth female grandmaster. At the age of 15 years and 5 months, she also became the youngest grandmaster in history, breaking Bobby Fischer's previous record from 1958 of 15 years and 6 months. She held the overall record for a little over two years. Pia Cramling and Xie Jun soon followed in obtaining the Grandmaster title in the next few years, and were the last two to do so before 2000. Xie was the first female grandmaster from outside Europe and the second grandmaster from China overall.

=== 21st century ===
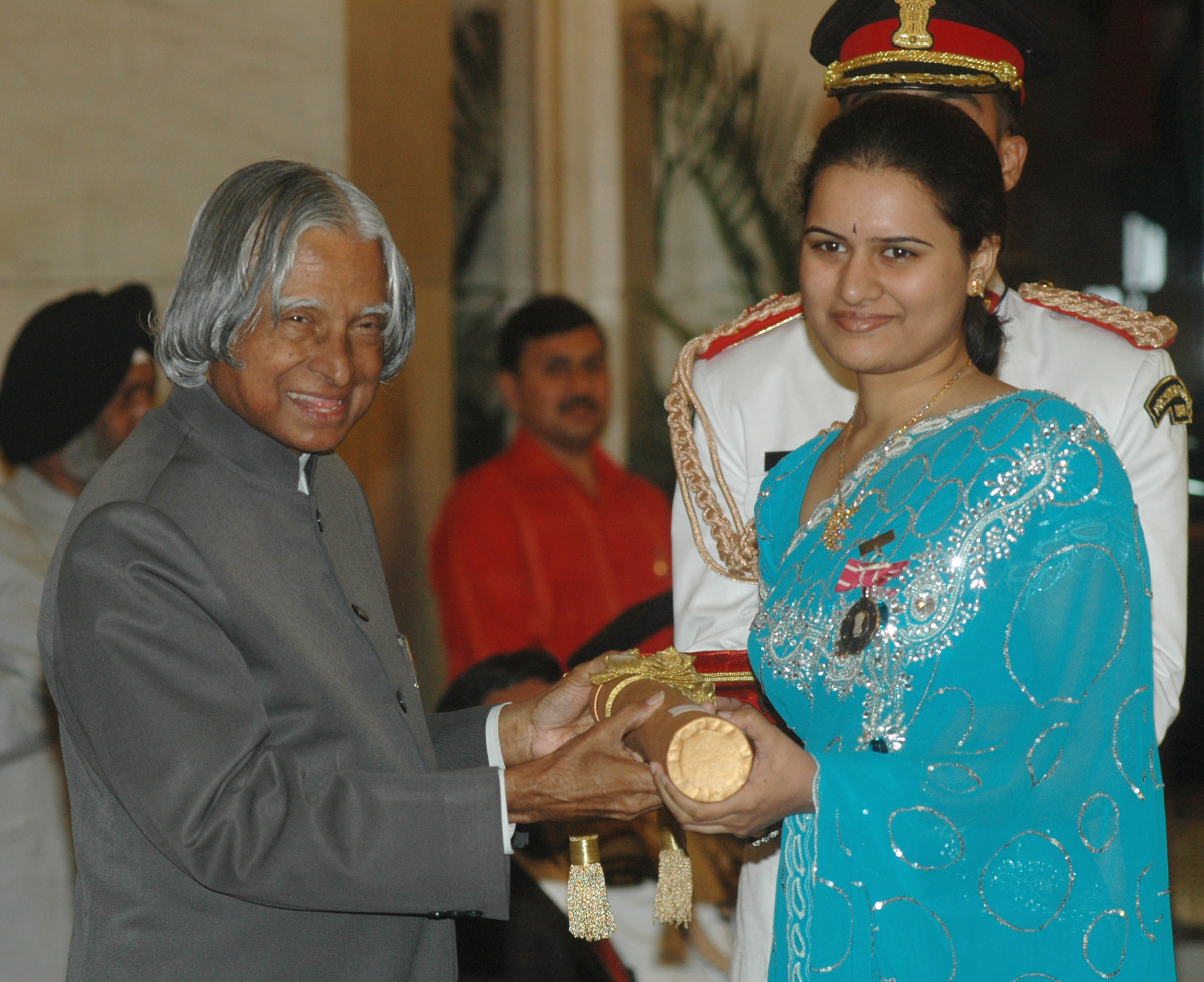
Koneru Humpy (right) broke Judit Polgár's record to become the youngest female grandmaster in 2002 and held the record until 2008.

After over six years without another woman achieving the Grandmaster title, the next century saw a much larger influx of new female grandmasters. Once Zhu Chen ended that stretch in 2001, the next two decades rarely saw gaps of more than a year without a new female grandmaster. Judit Polgár's record as the youngest female grandmaster lasted a little over a decade until it was broken by Koneru Humpy in 2002 at the age of 15 years and 1 month. Hou Yifan then became the youngest female grandmaster in 2008 at 14 years and 6 months. Hou also reached the top 100 in 2014, peaking at No. 55 a year later. At some point by 2003, FIDE changed their regulations and began awarding the Grandmaster title to players who win the Women's World Championship if they are not already grandmasters. Since then, four players have obtained the Grandmaster title in this manner, most recently Tan Zhongyi in 2017. The Kosintseva sisters Tatiana and Nadezhda as well as the Muzychuk sisters Anna and Mariya both joined Susan and Judit Polgár as pairs of sisters to both be awarded the Grandmaster title. Irina Krush was the first player from outside Europe or Asia to be awarded the title in 2013.

With the increase in number of female grandmasters, it has been possible to stage women-only round-robin tournaments featuring mostly grandmasters. These include some of the FIDE Women's Grand Prix events that have been held since 2009 and the Cairns Cup that began in 2019. All but one of the ten players in the 2020 Cairns Cup were grandmasters. When the Candidates tournament was revived in 2019 to decide the next World Championship challenger, all of the competitors were grandmasters rated above 2500. While there has continued to be more female grandmasters, the rate of new women to achieve the title has thus far peaked a little before the 2010s. As the overall number of grandmasters has increased from about 300 in 1990 to over 1700 by 2020, women still make up no more than a few percent of the total.

== Title requirements ==
=== Regulations (2024–present) ===
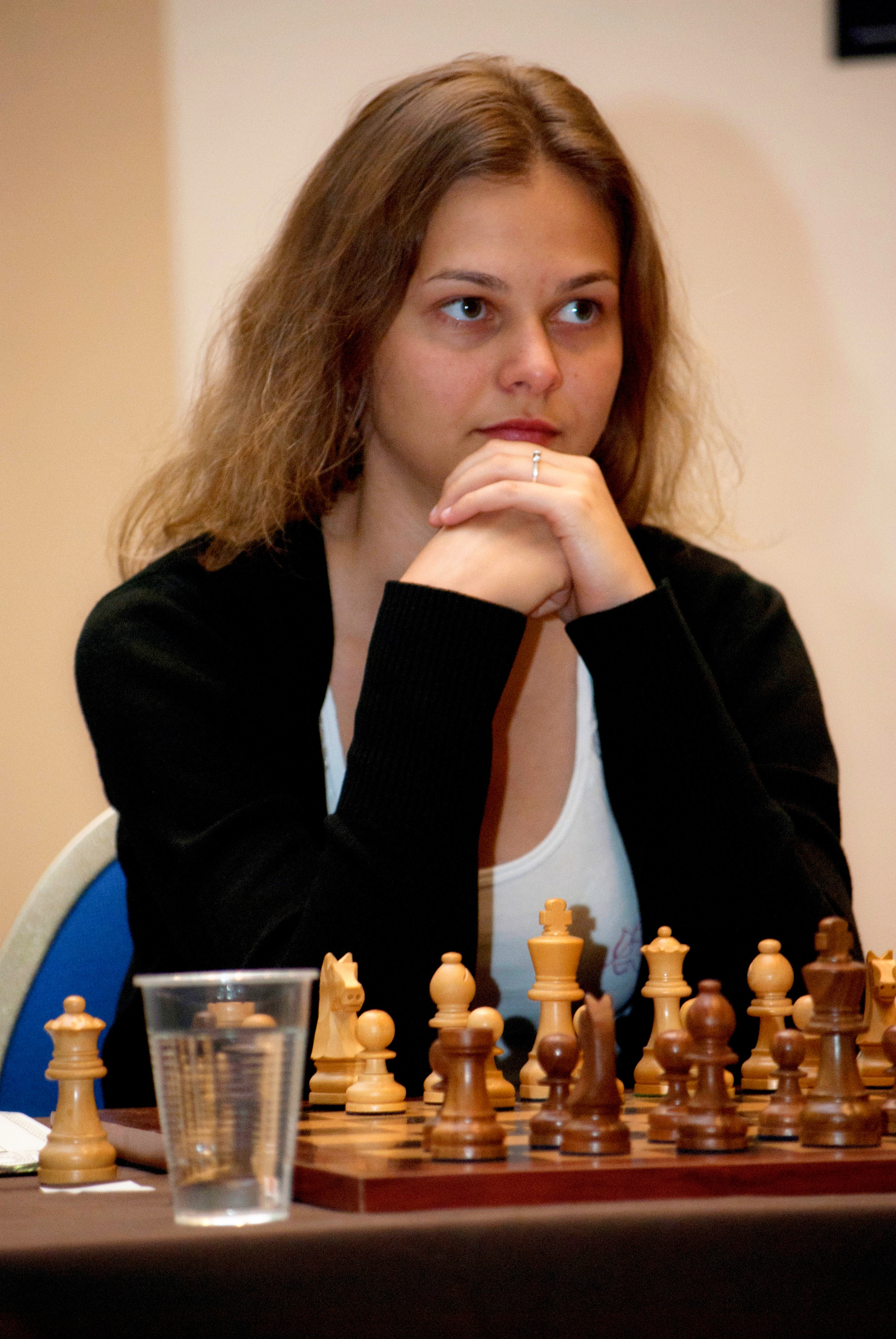
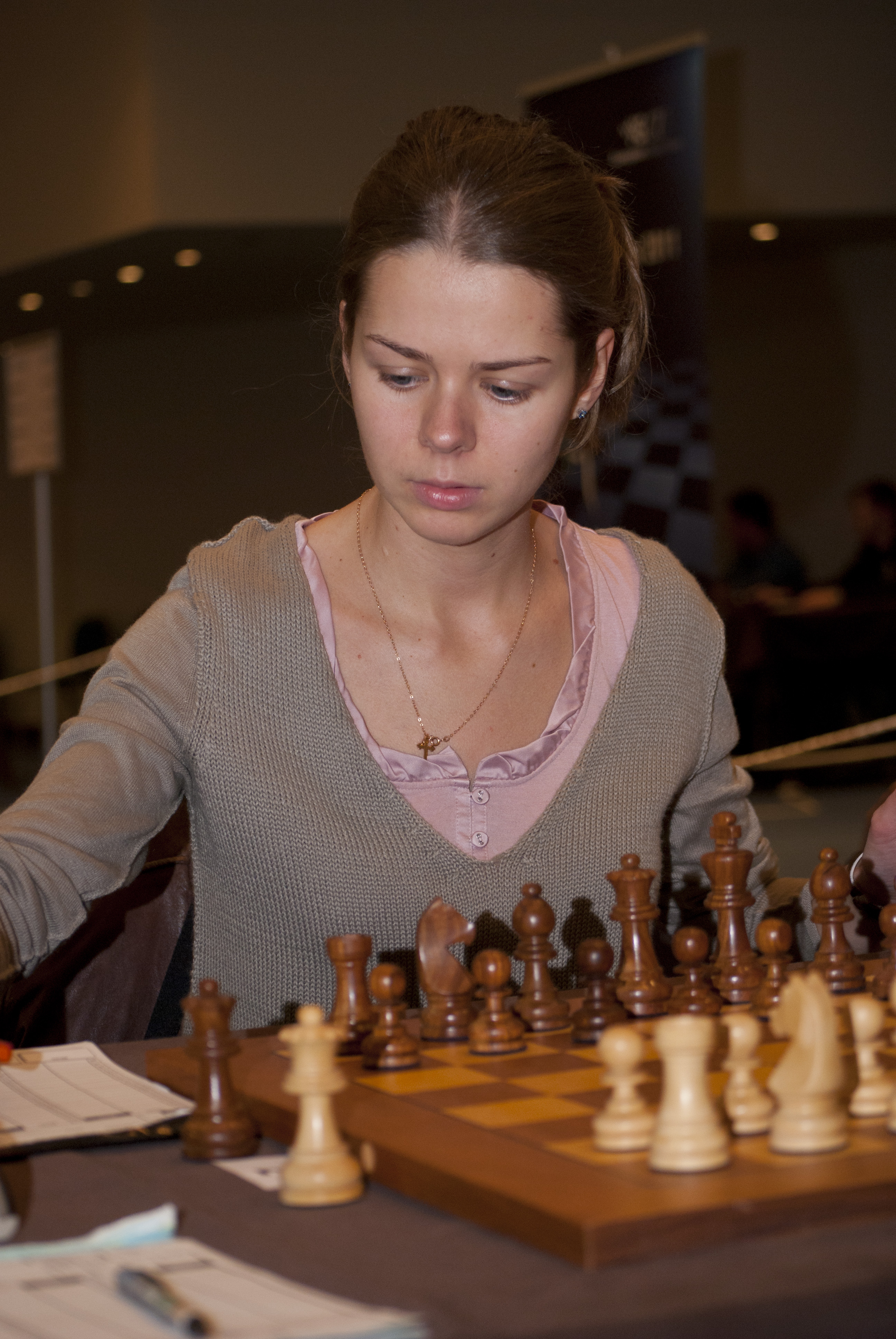
Anna Muzychuk (left) required four norms to obtain the Grandmaster title because her first norm was achieved over seven games. Tatiana Kosintseva (right) only needed two norms because a past rule counted her 11-game norm at the European championship as 20 games.

The modern requirements as of 2024 to obtain the Grandmaster title are essentially to reach a minimum FIDE rating of 2500 and achieve three tournament GM norms, albeit there are exceptions.

FIDE ranks players according to their official FIDE ratings published each month. These ratings are determined using an Elo rating system, which was first implemented in 1970. They depend only on the results of individual games at FIDE-rated tournaments. For a player who has previously been rated above 2400 playing against an opponent with an identical rating, a win is worth 5 rating points, a draw is worth 0 rating points, and a loss is worth -5 rating points. These values increase against higher-rated opponents and decrease against lower-rated opponents. Players can gain or lose no more than 10 rating points for a win or a loss respectively, (Note: This maximum value for the rating change of 10 is known as the K-factor or the development coefficient, and is typically stated as K=10. Lower-rated players have higher values of K=20 or K=40.) and can gain or lose no more than 5 rating points for a draw. Although FIDE ratings are only published at the start of every month, the required rating for the Grandmaster title of 2500 can be achieved in the middle of a rating period or even the middle of a tournament.

A norm is a performance at a title level at a FIDE-rated tournament. Players need to have a performance rating of at least 2600 to achieve a GM norm at a tournament. A player's performance rating depends on their score in the tournament and the average rating of their opponents. (Note: A player's score is their number of points divided by their number of games. A win is worth 1 point, a draw is worth a ½ point, and a loss is worth 0 points.) The player's score is converted to a rating difference according to a published conversion table of values, and that rating difference is added to their opponents' average rating to compute their performance rating. For example, some of the scores a player may need to achieve a GM norm in a nine-round tournament are 7/9 (Note: 7 points in 9 games) against 2380-rated opponents, 6½/9 against 2434-rated opponents, or 4½/9 against 2600-rated opponents. Moreover, there are other requirements such as having one-third of a player's opponents be grandmasters. Although players generally need three GM norms, the exact requirement is for them to have 27 games between all of their norms. As a result, they may need one extra norm if their tournaments are shorter than the usual required length of at least nine games.

A player can circumvent these requirements and achieve a norm or be awarded the title directly if they achieve certain results at specified tournaments. Any winner of the Women's World Championship or the Women's World Cup who is not already a grandmaster is directly awarded the Grandmaster title. Any runner-up receives a GM norm.

=== Previous regulations ===
Winning the Women's World Championship did not always confer a direct award of the title. Around the time Maia Chiburdanidze was world champion, each World Championship match win only resulted in a norm and thus three match wins or other norms were needed to obtain the title. Around the time Xie Jun was world champion, only two World Championship match wins were required to obtain the title. Beginning in 1993, the requirements changed to a direct award of the Grandmaster title simply for winning the championship.

In the past, FIDE had counted norms at the Chess Olympiad and continental championships as "double norms" over 20 games. As a result, it was common for players to need only one additional norm plus the rating requirement if they earned a norm at the Women's Chess Olympiad or the European Individual Women's Chess Championship (EWCC). This regulation for the Olympiad began in 2005 and was discontinued in 2017. The regulation for the continental championships was discontinued earlier in 2014. Previously from 2003 to 2005, players could be directly awarded the Grandmaster title if they achieved just the performance rating of 2600 required for a typical GM norm, a feat known as a GM performance, over at least 12 games at a continental championship.

== Key ==
Header key
Header	Explanation
Name	Player's name
Federation	Current national federation as of March 2025. Previous federations specified in notes.
Birth date	Player's birth date
Age	Player's current age
Award year	Year FIDE awarded the player's GM title
Title date	Month the last requirement for the GM title was completed. Direct awards indicated in notes.
Title age	Player's age at the time of the title date
Peak rating	Highest published FIDE rating during a player's career as of July 2025, referenced by the player's FIDE profile
WWC	First and last years a player was the Women's World Champion (WWC). Multiple reigns are specified in notes.
Title app	Player's GM title application, linked from their initials. Links to norm specifics.
Refs	Additional references if needed or complementary to the GM title application.

== Grandmasters ==
Symbol key
°	Active player (as of July 2025)

List of female chess grandmasters
Name	Federation	Birth date	Age	Award year	Title date	Title age	Peak rating	WWC		Title app	Refs
Name	Federation	Birth date	Age	Award year	Title date	Title age	Peak rating	First	Last	Title app	Refs
Nona Gaprindashvili°	Georgia (Note: Gaprindashvili: Soviet Union → Georgia (1992); awarded GM title with Soviet Union)	3 May 1941	85	1978	November 1978 (Note: Nona Gaprindashvili: FIDE decision)	37	2495	1962	1978		
Maia Chiburdanidze	Georgia (Note: Chiburdanidze: Soviet Union → Georgia (1992); awarded GM title with Soviet Union)	17 January 1961	65	1984	October 1984 (Note: Maia Chiburdanidze: 3-time World Champion)	23	2560	1978	1991		
Susan Polgar	Hungary (Note: S. Polgar: Hungary → United States (2002), United States → Hungary (2019))	19 April 1969	57	1991	January 1991	21	2577	1996	1999		
Judit Polgár	Hungary	23 July 1976	50	1992	December 1991	15	2735	N/A			
Pia Cramling°	Sweden	23 April 1963	63	1992	February 1992	28	2550	N/A			
Xie Jun	China	30 October 1970	56	1994	December 1993 (Note: Xie Jun: World Champion)	23	2574	1991	2001 (Note: Xie: 1991–1996, 1999–2001)		
Zhu Chen	Qatar (Note: Zhu Chen: China → Qatar (2006); awarded GM title with China)	16 March 1976	50	2001	November 2000	24	2548	2001	2004		
Antoaneta Stefanova°	Bulgaria	19 April 1979	47	2002	July 2001	22	2560	2004	2006		
Koneru Humpy°	India	31 March 1987	39	2002	May 2002	15	2623	N/A			
Alexandra Kosteniuk°	Switzerland (Note: Kosteniuk: Russia → Switzerland (2023); awarded GM title with Russia)	23 April 1984	42	2004	April 2004 (Note: Alexandra Kosteniuk: GM performance over 12 games at the European Championship)	19	2561	2008	2010	AK	
Peng Zhaoqin	Netherlands (Note: Peng: China → Netherlands (1996))	8 May 1968	58	2004	April 2004 (Note: Peng Zhaoqin: GM performance over 12 games at the European Championship)	35	2472	N/A			
Xu Yuhua	China	29 October 1976	50	2007	March 2006 (Note: Xu Yuhua: World Champion)	29	2517	2006	2008		
Hoang Thanh Trang	Hungary (Note: Hoang: Vietnam → Hungary (2006))	25 April 1980	46	2007	June 2006	26	2511	N/A		HTT	
Kateryna Lagno°	Russia (Note: Lagno: Ukraine → Russia (2014); awarded GM title with Ukraine)	27 December 1989	36	2007	August 2006	16	2563	N/A		KL	
Zhao Xue°	China	6 April 1985	41	2008	July 2007	22	2579	N/A		ZX	
Marie Sebag°	France	15 October 1986	40	2008	May 2008	21	2537	N/A		MS	
Monika Soćko°	Poland	24 March 1978	48	2008	May 2008	30	2505	N/A		MS	
Nana Dzagnidze°	Georgia	1 January 1987	39	2008	September 2008	21	2573	N/A		ND	
Hou Yifan°	China	27 February 1994	32	2008	September 2008	14	2686	2010	2017 (Note: Hou: 2010–2012, 2013–2015, 2016–2017)	HY	
Ketevan Arakhamia-Grant°	Scotland (Note: Arakhamia-Grant: Soviet Union → Georgia (1992), Georgia → Scotland (2008))	19 July 1968	58	2009	November 2008	40	2506	N/A		KAG	
Tatiana Kosintseva	Russia	11 April 1986	40	2009	February 2009	22	2581	N/A		TK	
Natalia Zhukova°	Ukraine	5 June 1979	47	2010	March 2010	30	2499	N/A		NZ	
Viktorija Čmilytė	Lithuania	6 August 1983	43	2010	March 2010	26	2542	N/A		VC	
Elina Danielian°	Armenia (Note: Danielian: Soviet Union → Armenia (1992))	16 August 1978	48	2010	August 2010	31	2521	N/A		ED	
Nadezhda Kosintseva	Russia	14 January 1985	41	2011	February 2011	26	2576	N/A		NK	
Harika Dronavalli°	India	12 January 1991	35	2011	July 2011	20	2543	N/A		HD	
Ju Wenjun°	China	31 January 1991	35	2014	October 2011	20	2604	2018	Pres.	JW	
Anna Muzychuk°	Ukraine (Note: A. Muzychuk: Ukraine → Slovenia (2004), Slovenia → Ukraine (2014); awarded GM title with Slovenia)	28 February 1990	36	2012	November 2011	21	2606	N/A		AM	
Anna Ushenina°	Ukraine	30 August 1985	41	2012	December 2012 (Note: Anna Ushenina: World Champion)	27	2502	2012	2013		
Valentina Gunina°	FIDE (Note: Players without a national federation can play under the FIDE flag. Both such players as of 2023, Valentina Gunina and Aleksandra Goryachkina, previously played for Russia.)	4 February 1989	37	2013	January 2013	23	2548	N/A		VG	
Bella Khotenashvili°	Georgia	1 June 1988	38	2013	May 2013	24	2531	N/A		BK	
Irina Krush°	United States	24 December 1983	42	2013	September 2013	29	2502	N/A		IK	
Mariya Muzychuk°	Ukraine	21 September 1992	34	2015	April 2015 (Note: Mariya Muzychuk: World Champion)	22	2563	2015	2016		
Lei Tingjie°	China	3 March 1997	29	2017	December 2016	19	2569	N/A		LT	
Tan Zhongyi°	China	29 May 1991	35	2017	March 2017 (Note: Tan Zhongyi: World Champion)	25	2561	2017	2018		
Nino Batsiashvili°	Georgia	1 January 1987	39	2018	January 2018	31	2528	N/A		NB	
Aleksandra Goryachkina°	FIDE	28 September 1998	28	2018	February 2018	19	2611	N/A		AG	
Olga Girya°	Russia	4 June 1991	35	2021	March 2021	29	2505	N/A		OG	
Zhansaya Abdumalik	Kazakhstan	12 January 2000	26	2021	May 2021	21	2507	N/A		ZA	
Elisabeth Pähtz°	Germany	8 January 1985	41	2022	November 2021	36	2513	N/A		EP	
Zhu Jiner°	China	16 November 2002	23	2023	April 2023	20	2579	N/A		ZJ	
Vaishali Rameshbabu°	India	21 June 2001	25	2024	December 2023	22	2506	N/A		VR	
Bibisara Assaubayeva°	Kazakhstan	26 February 2004	22	2025	May 2025	21	2538	N/A		BA	
Divya Deshmukh°	India	9 December 2005	20	2025	July 2025 (Note: Divya Deshmukh: World Cup winner)	19	2510	N/A			

Federation switches:

Direct awards:

Multiple reigns of the Women's World Championship:

=== By year ===
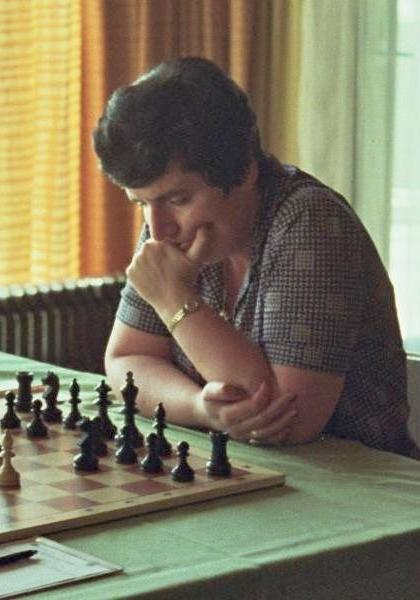
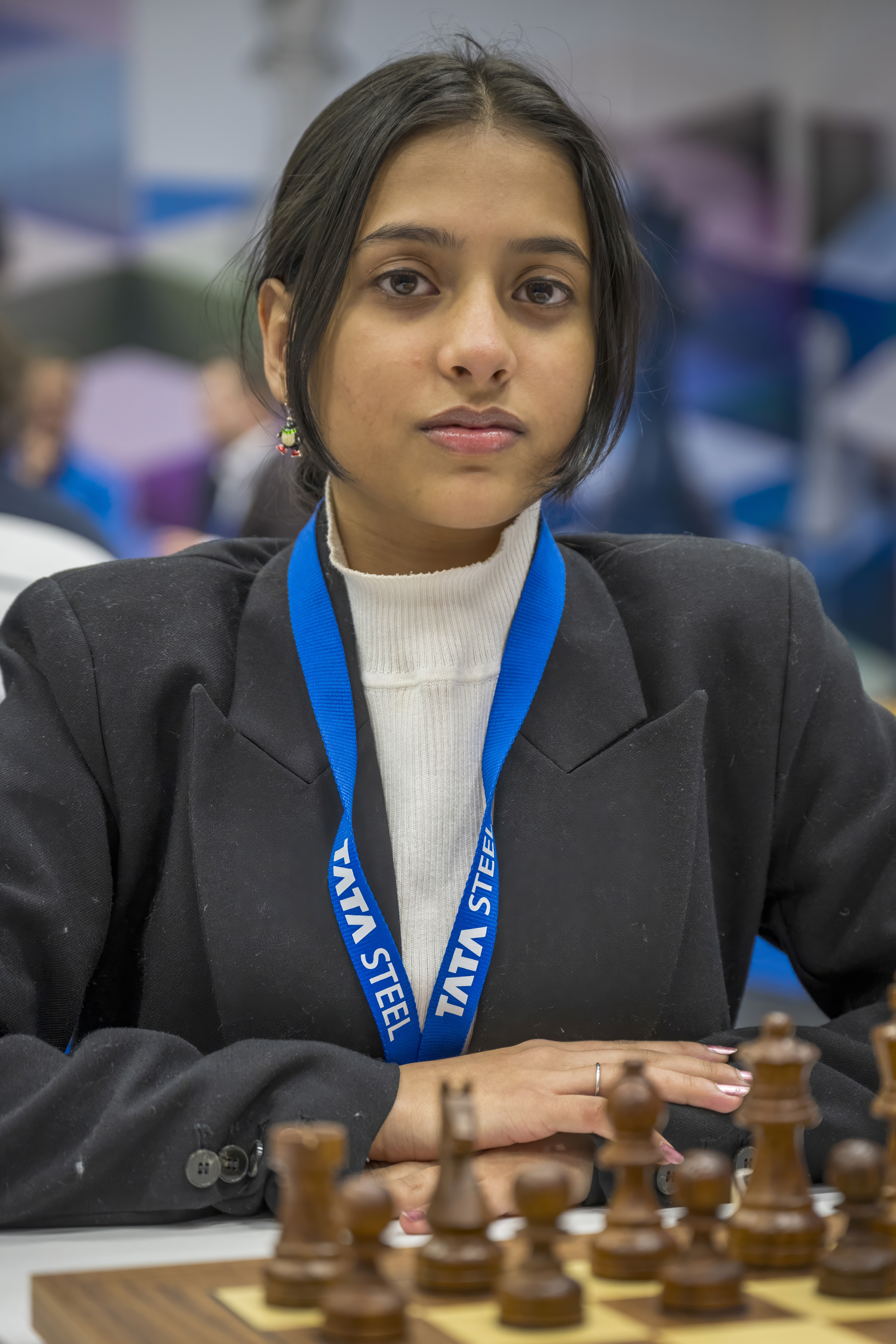
Nona Gaprindashvili (left) was the first woman to achieve the GM title in November 1978; as of August 2026, Divya Deshmukh (right) was the most recent in July 2025.

The following chart illustrates the total number of female grandmasters by year based on the date when each player achieved the GM title (the title date).

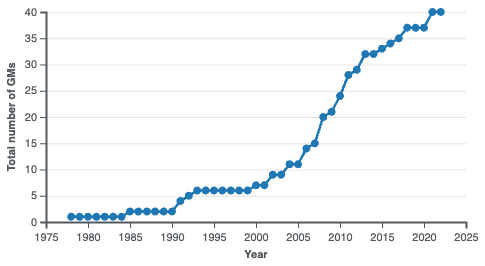

=== By title age ===
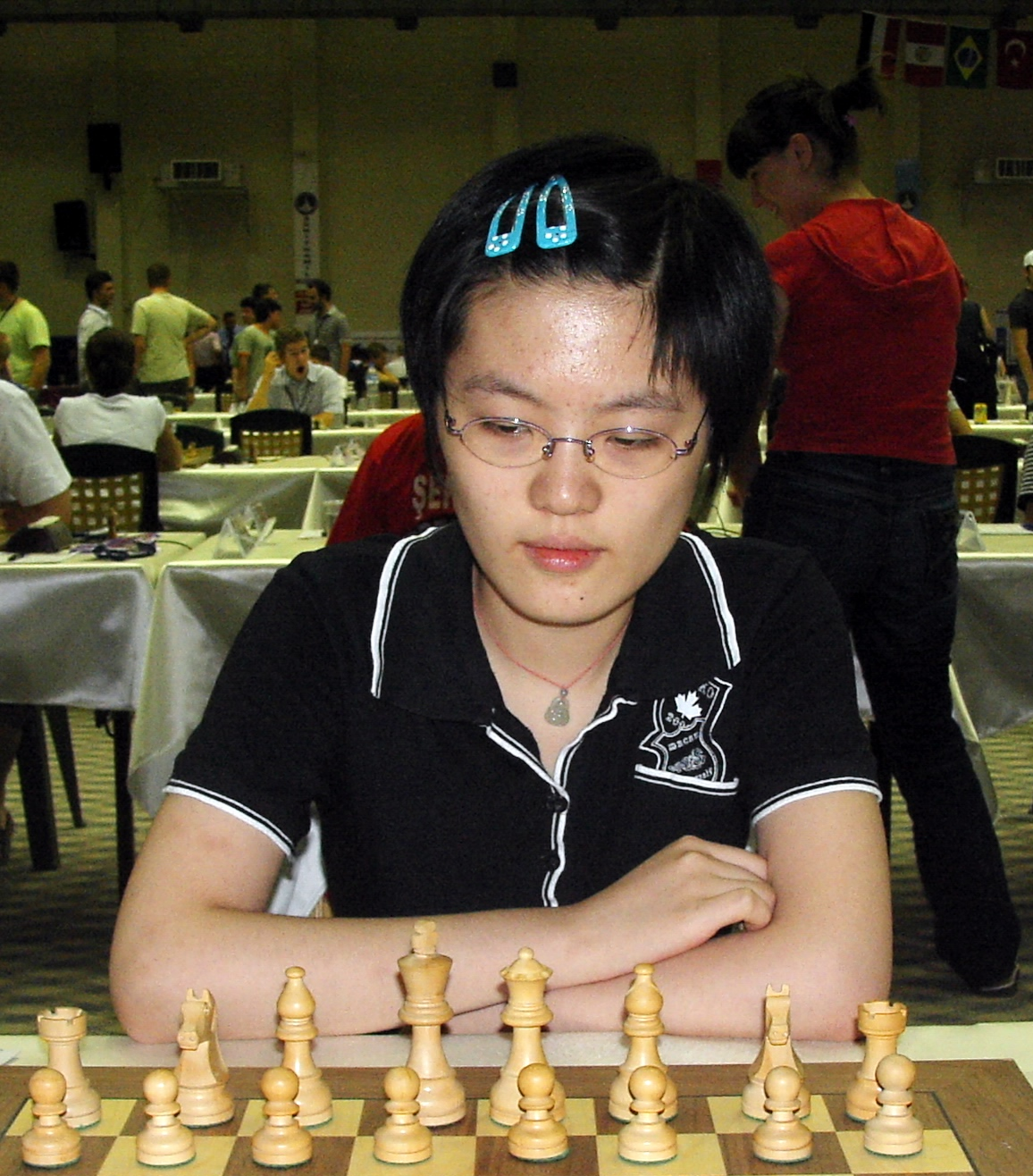
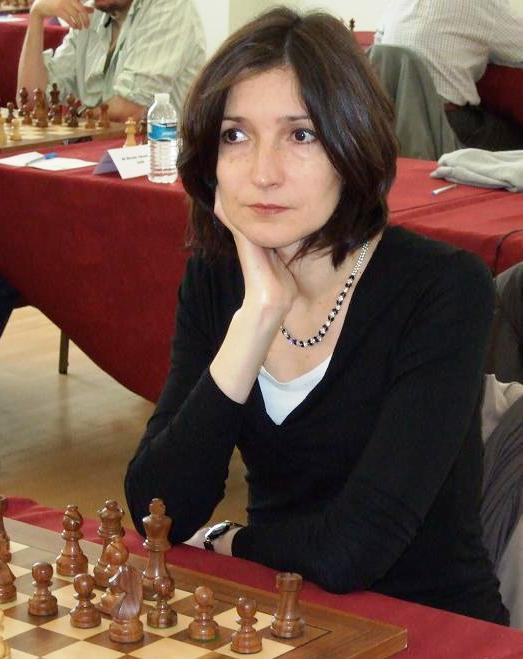
Hou Yifan (left) was the youngest woman to become a GM at age 14; Ketevan Arakhamia-Grant (right) was the oldest at age 40. Both players earned the title in 2008.

The following chart illustrates the cumulative number of female grandmasters by age based on the date when each player achieved the GM title (the title date).

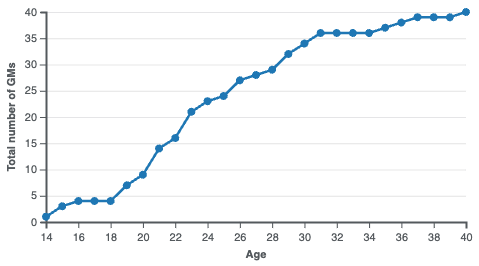

=== By country ===
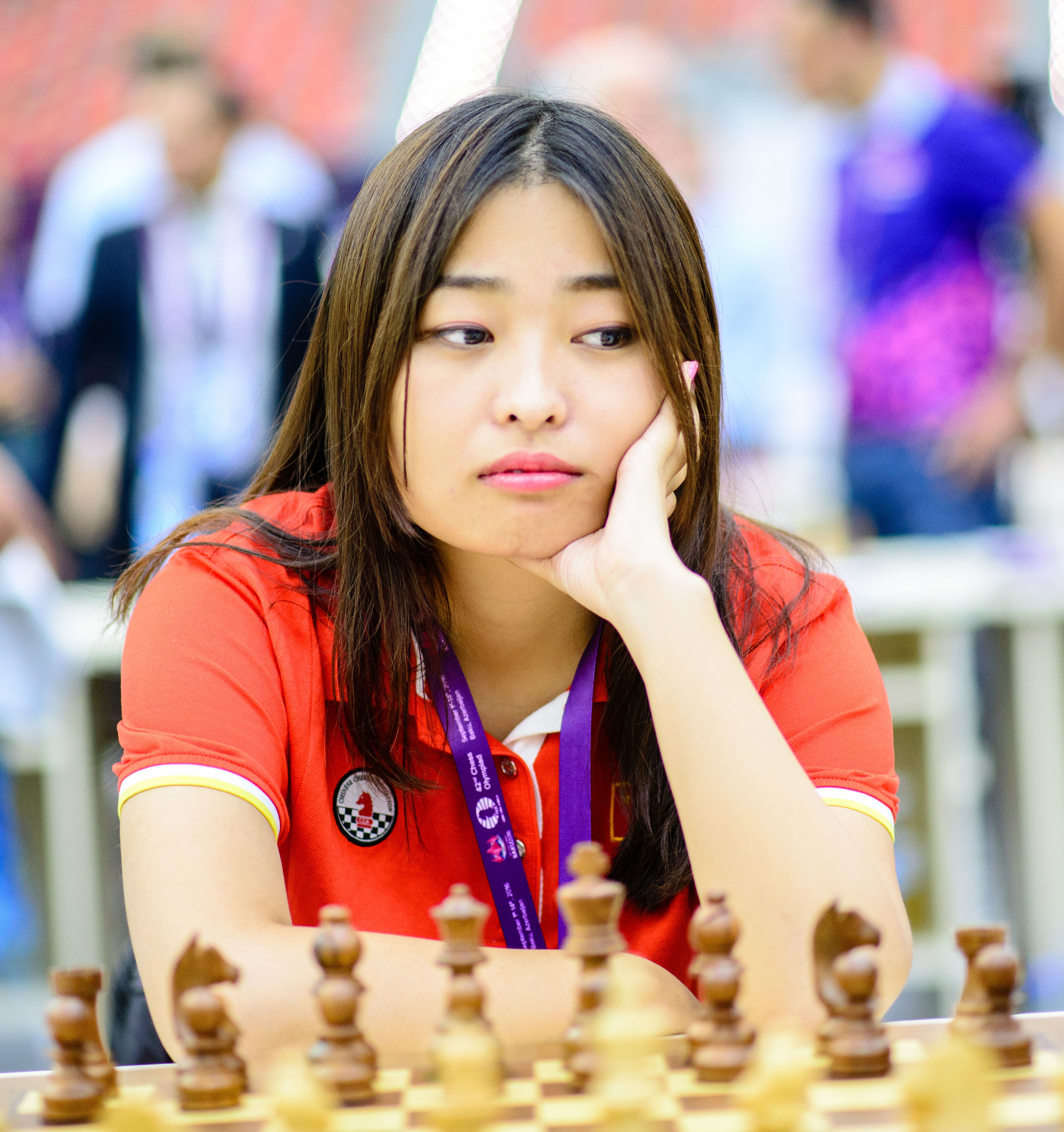
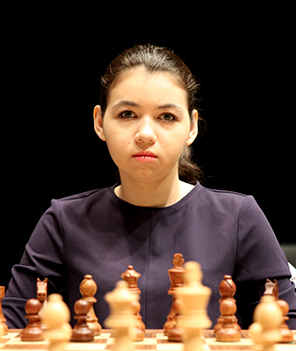
As of August 2023, China and Russia have had the most female grandmasters in total. Chinese GM Ju Wenjun (left) defeated Russian GM Aleksandra Goryachkina (right) in the 2020 World Championship match.

The following table shows the number of active female grandmasters from each national federation, as well as the count of all female grandmasters according to their current federation, their federation at the time they were awarded the title, and the overall total.

Federation	Active (Oct 2025)	Current (Oct 2025)	At award date	Overall
China	6	8	9	10
Georgia	4	5	3	6
Ukraine	4	4	4	5
India	4	4	4	4
Russia	2	4	6	7
FIDE	2	2	0	N/A
Kazakhstan	1	2	2	2
United States	1	1	1	2
Armenia	1	1	1	1
Bulgaria	1	1	1	1
France	1	1	1	1
Germany	1	1	1	1
Poland	1	1	1	1
Scotland	1	1	1	1
Sweden	1	1	1	1
Switzerland	1	1	0	1
Hungary	0	3	3	3
Lithuania	0	1	1	1
Netherlands	0	1	1	1
Qatar	0	1	0	1
Soviet Union	0	0	2	4
Slovenia	0	0	1	1
Vietnam	0	0	0	1
Total	32	44	44	–

== See also ==
- Women in chess
- Grandmaster (chess)
- List of female chess players
- List of chess grandmasters
