= Aleksandra Goryachkina =

Russian chess grandmaster (born 1998)

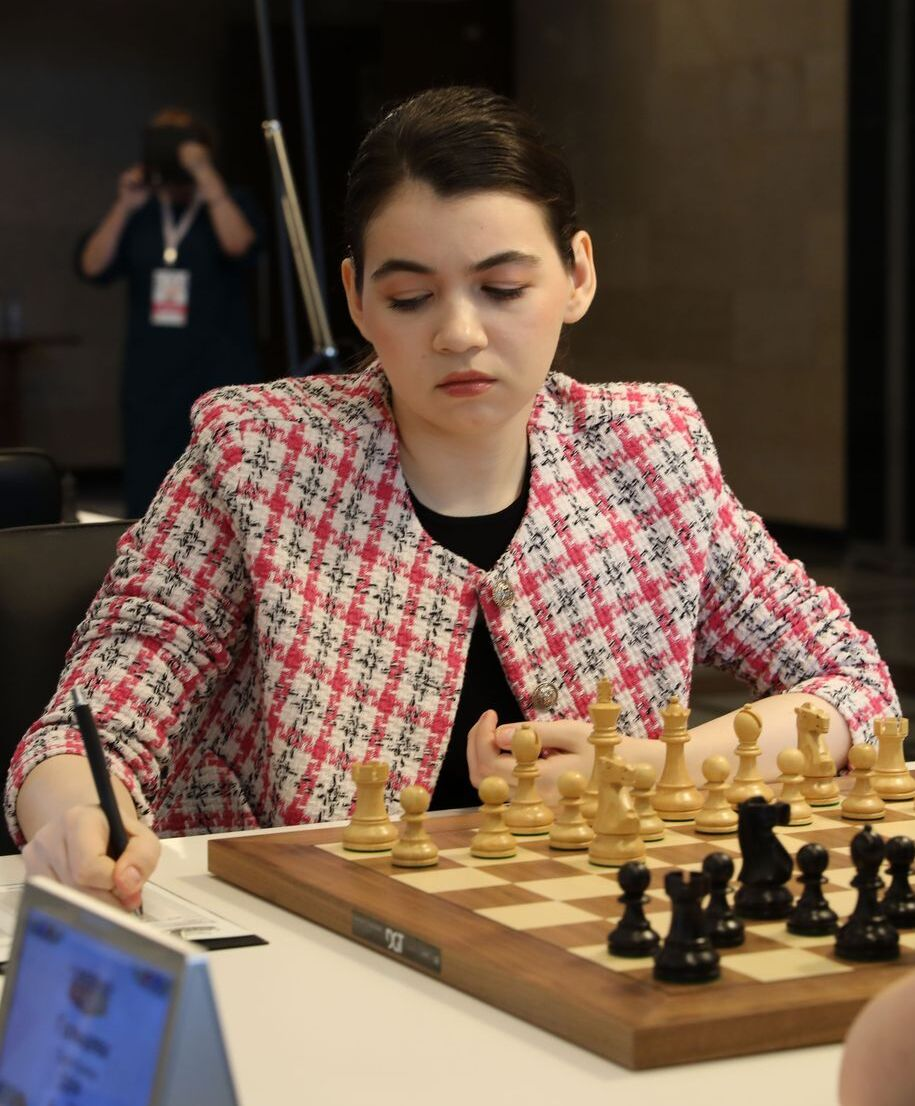
- Goryachkina at the Russian Chess Championship Superfinal 2024

Personal information
- Born: Aleksandra Yuryevna Goryachkina; 28 September 1998 (age 28) Orsk, Russia

Chess career
- Country: Russia
- Title: Grandmaster (2018)
- FIDE rating: 2540 (November 2026)
- Peak rating: 2611 (August 2021)

Aleksandra Yuryevna Goryachkina (Russian: Александра Юрьевна Горячкина; born 28 September 1998) is a Russian chess grandmaster (GM). She is the highest rated Russian woman in chess history with a peak FIDE rating of 2611. Goryachkina was the challenger in the 2020 Women's World Championship match, which she lost in rapid tiebreaks to Ju Wenjun. She is also a three-time Russian Women's Chess Champion, which she achieved in 2015, 2017, and 2020. In August 2023, she won the Women's Chess World Cup after defeating Nurgyul Salimova in the finals. She won the Women's World Rapid Championship in 2025 after defeating Zhu Jiner in blitz playoff.

Goryachkina was born into a chess family; her father is a chess coach, and both of her parents have been rated above 2200. She quickly emerged as a chess prodigy, winning the under-10, under-14, and under-18 girls' divisions of the World Youth Chess Championship. She is also a two-time girls' World Junior Champion. At the age of 13, Goryachkina became the fifth-youngest Woman Grandmaster (WGM) in history. She then became the fifth-youngest woman to earn the Grandmaster title as a teenager in early 2018. She first entered the women's top 10 in the world later that year, and reached the top 3 with a dominant performance to win the 2019 Candidates Tournament and qualify for the 2020 World Championship match.

Some of Goryachkina's best performances have come in the open Russian Championship Higher League where she scored 5½/9 in both 2018 and 2020 for performance ratings of 2713 and 2656, and the Russian Team Championship Higher League where she scored 6/8 in 2019 for a performance rating of 2670. She also had a performance rating of 2666 when she won the 2019 Candidates Tournament with a score of 9½/14.

== Early life and background ==
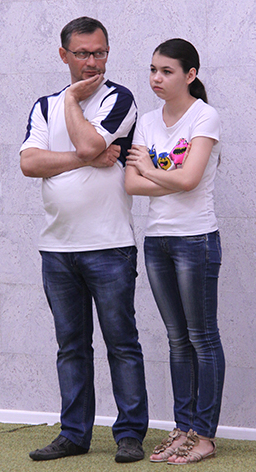
Goryachkina with her father (2015)

Aleksandra Goryachkina was born on 28 September 1998 in Orsk, Orenburg Oblast, Russia to Larisa Matvienko and Yuri Goryachkin, (Note: registered with FIDE as Jouri Goriatchkin) both of whom are experienced chess players. Her father in particular is a FIDE Master (FM) with a peak FIDE rating of 2395, and her mother is a Russian Candidate for Master of Sports in chess with a peak FIDE rating of 2210. Her father is also a chess coach and an official FIDE trainer. Additionally, Goryachkina has a sister Oksana who is 12 years younger and also a chess player.

Despite her parents' backgrounds, Goryachkina was initially not interested in chess, instead preferring activities such as dancing and playing table tennis. Nonetheless, she eventually became more interested in chess and began playing at the age of six. When Goryachkina was in kindergarten, her father would bring her to his evening chess school for children. According to her mother, Goryachkina largely taught herself to be an expert while watching her father's classes from the side. Her father ended up being her first coach. Goryachkina was able to defeat her mother in chess by the age of nine, and her father not long after. Following her first youth world championship title, Goryachkina and her father moved to Salekhard, YaNAO in Siberia in 2011 so that she could train at the Anatoly Karpov Polar Chess School, where her father would also work as a coach. After about a year or more, her mother and younger sister joined them in Salekhard. At the Polar Chess School, she began working with Vladimir Belov, a Russian Grandmaster (GM).

== Chess career ==
=== 2008–14: Two-time World Junior champion ===
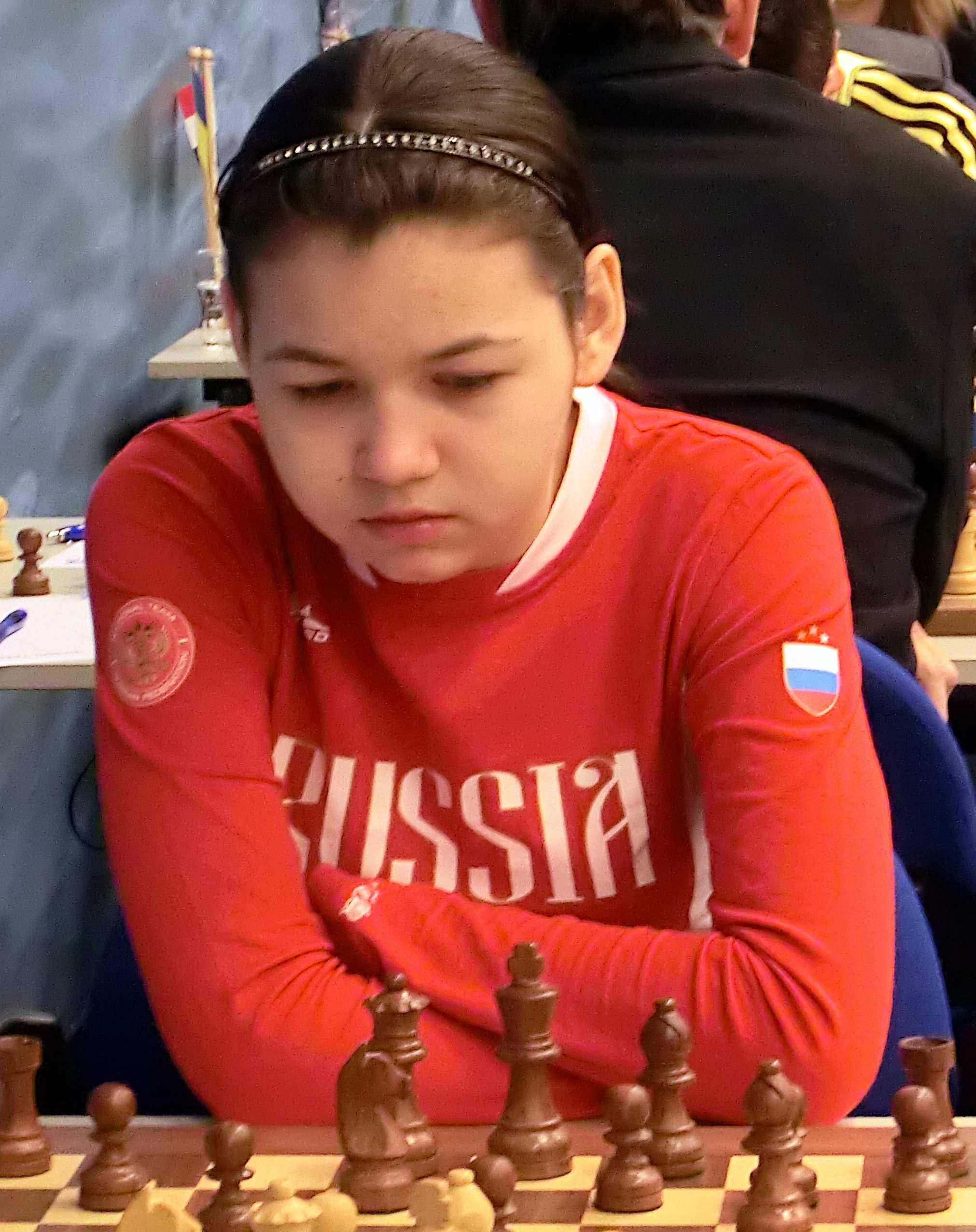
Goryachkina at the Tata Steel Chess Tournament in 2013

Goryachkina had success at the World Youth and World Junior Chess Championships from a young age, generally as one of the highest-rated players in these tournaments. She won five gold medals in the girls' championships, one each at the under-10 youth level in 2008, the under-14 youth level in 2011, and the under-18 youth level in 2012; and two at the under-20 junior level in 2013 and 2014 at 14 and 16 years old respectively. She also won a bronze medal at the under-12 youth level in 2009, finishing 1½ points behind Sarasadat Khademalsharieh after 11 rounds. Goryachkina won the under-10, under-14, and second under-20 gold medals as the top seed in these events, and she was also the second seed in the under-18 event. Her best performance at these tournaments came in the 2011 under-14 event, where she scored a perfect 9/9. During the tournament, she defeated the next three best-placed finishers, including second seed and bronze medallist Khademalsharieh. Goryachkina was rated 2313 at the time compared to Khademalsharieh's rating of 2215. Khademalsharieh also finished runner-up to Goryachkina when she won her second girls' World Junior Championship in 2014, finishing 1½ points behind after 13 rounds. Goryachkina had a similar level of success in the European Youth Chess Championship. After winning a silver medal at the under-12 level in 2009, she won gold medals in three successive years at the under-12 level in 2010, the under-14 level in 2011, and the under-18 level in 2012.

Goryachkina first reached a FIDE rating of 2000 in January 2009 at the age of ten, gaining 60 rating points from winning the 2008 Russian PriFR under-18 event. Her biggest yearly ratings jump took place in 2011 at the age of twelve, when she rose nearly 300 points from 2045 to 2333. Having already earned the Women's FIDE Master (WFM) title, she gained 48 rating points at the 61st Women's Russian Championship FL. She then competed in her first European Individual Women's Chess Championship and scored 5½/11, highlighted by a win against Woman Grandmaster (WGM) Olga Girya. Goryachkina followed this success by coming in joint first at the Czech Open and clear first at the Lyudmila Rudenko Memorial, again gaining about 48 rating points at both events. With her performance at the Czech Open, she clinched the Woman International Master (WIM) title and also earned a WGM norm.

Following her 2011 breakthrough year, Goryachkina continued to steadily rise in rating in 2012, reaching 2400 for the first time by January 2013. Early in 2012, she earned two more WGM norms, the last of which came at her second European Individual Women's Chess Championship. As she was already rated above 2300, she became one of the youngest WGMs in history at the time in March 2012 at the age of 13 years, 5 months, and 14 days, a little over a year behind Hou Yifan who achieved the feat at 12 years and 3 months old. Two other early year highlights were a victory over GM Davit Petrosian at the 2012 Aeroflot Open B, and a joint second-place finish at the Russian under-20 junior girls' championship. Late in the year, she won the junior V. Dvorkovich Cup 2012 on a tiebreak over fellow future GMs Yinglun Ju and Grigoriy Oparin before closing the year as both the European and World girls' under-18 champion as well as the Russian Cup for Women winner over Olga Girya.

Goryachkina maintained a rating in the low 2400s throughout most of 2013 and 2014, reaching as high as 2441 in December 2014. She took part in the Tata Steel C Tournament in Wijk aan Zee in January 2013, the third tier open round-robin of one of the leading annual chess tournaments in the world, scoring near the bottom at 3½/13. She elected to compete in the open division of the Russian under-19 championship and finished runner-up with 6½/9. With her joint second-place finish the Women's Russian Championship Higher League, she qualified for the Russian Women's Championship Superfinal for the first time. She scored 4½/9 for joint fourth place in 2013 and then scored 5½/9 for joint third in 2014. Goryachkina also earned one International Master (IM) norm in 2013 and 2014 at the European Individual Women's Chess Championship and the open European Individual Chess Championship respectively. In addition to winning the girls' World Junior Championships in 2013 and 2014, she entered the open under-18 events at the World Youth Championships and scored 6½/11 both times. During 2014, she defeated two GMs rated above 2600 in Boris Savchenko and Alexander Ipatov.

=== 2015–18: Teenage Grandmaster, two-time Russian champion ===
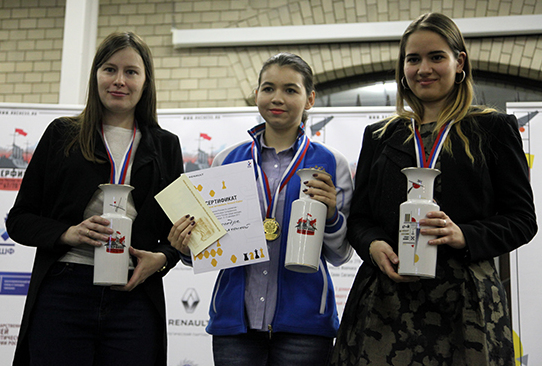
Goryachkina (center) holding the winner's prizes at the 2017 Russian Women's Championship Superfinal, left Natalia Pogonina and right Alina Kashlinskaya

Goryachkina was on the cusp of a 2500 rating throughout the second half of 2015 and first achieved it in January 2016 at the age of 17. She earned her third and final IM norm at the 2015 European Individual Championship for the second consecutive year with a better score of 6½/11. Although she would earn more norms over the next few years, she was never officially awarded the IM title. Goryachkina made her debut in the Women's World Chess Championship knockout event in 2015, where she was eliminated in the second round by third seed Anna Muzychuk. Two of her best results in 2015 came towards the end of the year in Russia, where she became the Russian Women's Champion and also won the Russian Cup for Women for the second time. She won the Russian Women's Championship Superfinal with a score of 8/11 (+6–1=4) while still 16 years old. With this performance, she also earned her first GM norm.

After first crossing 2500, Goryachkina fell back into the 2400s in May 2016 and did not reach 2500 again until June 2018, albeit never falling below 2450 over that span of two years. She did not earn any more GM norms in 2016, at best getting three additional redundant IM norms. She could not repeat her previous year's performance at the 2016 Russian Women's Championship Superfinal, only scoring 5/11. Goryachkina began improving her rating again in 2017. Although she again lost in the second round of the Women's World Chess Championship, she earned a second GM norm at the European Individual Women's Championship. She won a silver medal at the tournament with a score of 8/11, a ½ point behind Nana Dzagnidze. At the end of year, Goryachkina won her second Russian Women's Championship. She defeated Natalia Pogonina in a rapid playoff after they finished joint first with 7/11.

Goryachkina returned to the 2500s in rating in the second half of 2018, reaching a new peak rating of 2535 in August. In April, she earned her third and final GM norm at the Aeroflot Open A. During the tournament, she scored 4½/9 (+1–1=7) against nine players all rated between 2571 and 2625, including eight GMs. She became the fifth-youngest woman to earn the Grandmaster title at 19 years and 5 months. As a new GM, she had another surge in rating in the Russian Championship Higher League in August, gaining 26 points with a score of 5½/9 and a performance rating of 2713 against opponents all rated above 2600. With this increase in rating, she also became ranked in the women's top 10 for the first time. Nonetheless, she lost in the second round of the Women's World Chess Championship for the third consecutive edition and finished in joint third at the Russian Women's Championship.

=== 2019–2021: World Championship challenger ===
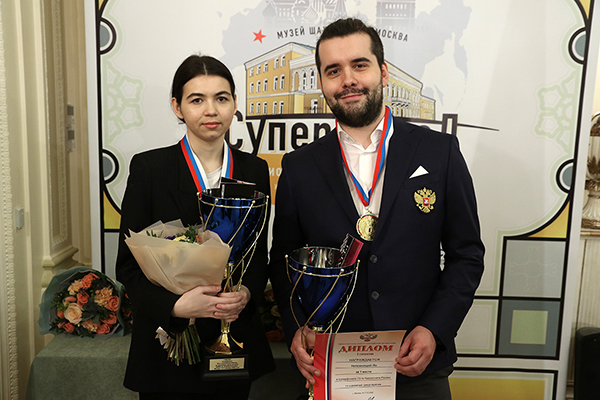
Goryachkina (left) and Ian Nepomniachtchi, winners of the women's and open sections at the 2020 Russian Championship Superfinal

Goryachkina gained back most of the rating points she lost in the preceding few months at the beginning of 2019. In particular, she scored 6½/11 at the 2019 European Individual Chess Championship in March, notably recording a win against Rauf Mamedov, who was rated 2701 at the time. She then made a major breakthrough at the Women's Candidates Tournament, which was being revived in conjunction with the dissolution of the knockout format that had been used for the past two decades. Goryachkina won the tournament by a wide margin of 1½ points. She scored 9½/14 and clinched the victory with two rounds remaining by virtue of having 9 points and a 2½ point lead after twelve rounds. With a dominant performance rating of 2666, she moved up to No. 3 in the world behind only Hou Yifan and reigning Women's World Chess Champion Ju Wenjun. She also earned the right to challenge Ju for the World Championship.

The Women's World Championship match took place in January 2020, with the first half in China and the second half in Russia. In China, Ju and Goryachkina each won a game with white. Back in Russia, Goryachkina took the lead in the eighth game before Ju won back-to-back games, the second of which was the only win with black in the match. Nevertheless, Goryachkina won the last classical game to send the match to a series of four rapid tiebreak games. After Goryachkina could not convert good winning chances in the first tiebreak game with black, Ju won the third game with white. With the other three tiebreak games ending in draws, Ju won the match and retained the Women's World Champion title.

Women's World Chess Championship 2020
	Rating	Classical games												Rapid tiebreaks				Points
	Rating	1	2	3	4	5	6	7	8	9	10	11	12	R1	R2	R3	R4	Points
Ju Wenjun (CHN)	2584	½	½	½	1	0	½	½	0	1	1	½	0	½	½	1	½	6 (2½)
Aleksandra Goryachkina (RUS)	2578	½	½	½	0	1	½	½	1	0	0	½	1	½	½	0	½	6 (1½)

Before the World Championship match, Goryachkina played the first two legs of the 2019–21 FIDE Women's Grand Prix. She finished in joint second in the first leg at Skolkovo in September behind only Koneru Humpy. In the next leg at Monaco in December, she finished in joint first with Koneru and Alexandra Kosteniuk, squandering a chance at clear first with a last-round loss to Koneru. Following the World Championship match, she again finished in joint first in the third leg at Lausanne in March, this time with Nana Dzagnidze, who won on the tiebreak criteria. With two joint first-place finishes and a joint second, Goryachkina ultimately won the overall Grand Prix with over more 100 points than Koneru, who missed the last of her three legs amidst the COVID-19 pandemic. Goryachkina did not play another rated match until October due to the pandemic, keeping a rating of 2582, her career best at the time. She resumed competition at the Russian Championship Higher League, where she matched her 2018 result with a score of 5½/9 and a performance rating of 2656 to take over the No. 2 spot in the women's rankings for the first time. Goryachkina finished the year by winning her third Russian Women's Championship Superfinal, defeating Polina Shuvalova in an armageddon tiebreak game with white after they finished joint first with 8/11.

In June/ July 2021, Goryachkina scored 6.5/9 in the Open Russian Championship Higher League. With this result, she qualified for the 74th Russian Championship Superfinal and hit a personal highest rating of 2611, the fourth highest ever achieved by a female player.

=== 2022-Present: World Cup and World Rapid Champion ===
Goryachkina participated in the 2023 Women's Candidates Tournament, having qualified as loser of the previous world Championship match. She won her first round against Kosteniuk but fell in semifinals to Tan Zhongyi. Goryachkina then qualified for the next candidates tournament after finishing second in the FIDE Women's Grand Prix 2022–23, winning the New Delhi event and finishing second in Astana. In August 2023, Goryachkina won the Women's Chess World Cup finals over Nurgyul Salimova. At the 2024 Candidates, Goryachkina was tied for the lead with 5 points after 8 rounds, but scored only 2 points in her remaining 6 games to finish 5th with an even score.

Goryachkina qualified for Women's Candidates Tournament 2026, by finishing 2nd in the final standings of FIDE Women's Grand Prix 2024-25, She won the Kazakhstan event, Tied for 1st at Monaco alongside Koneru Humpy & Batkhuyag Munguntuul, and Tied 3-5 at Cyprus. She was elimanated in the second round of Women's Chess World Cup 2025, by IM Meruert Kamalidenova, after having received a bye in Round 1. In September, She participated in open section of FIDE Grand Swiss Tournament 2025, She finished on 82nd/116, Winning games against Dmitrij Kollars, Daniil Yuffa and Former Challenger Boris Gelfand.

In December 2025, she won the Women's World Rapid Championship after defeating Zhu Jiner in blitz playoff.

Goryachkina finished 4th at the Women's Candidates Tournament 2026 (+3-2=9).

== Team competitions ==
=== Youth events ===
Goryachkina's first youth team success was when she led Russia to a gold medal while scoring 3/3 on the top board at the under-18 girls' European Team Championship in 2012. She played the second board at the under-16 Chess Olympiad in 2014 behind David Paravyan. Russia finished runner-up to India for a silver medal. Individually, Goryachkina finished fourth on the second board, and won the girls' gold medal. She also won a brilliancy award for her seventh-round game with black against Cemil Can Ali Marandi for dangerously sacrificing a rook and a knight on the kingside.

=== International events ===
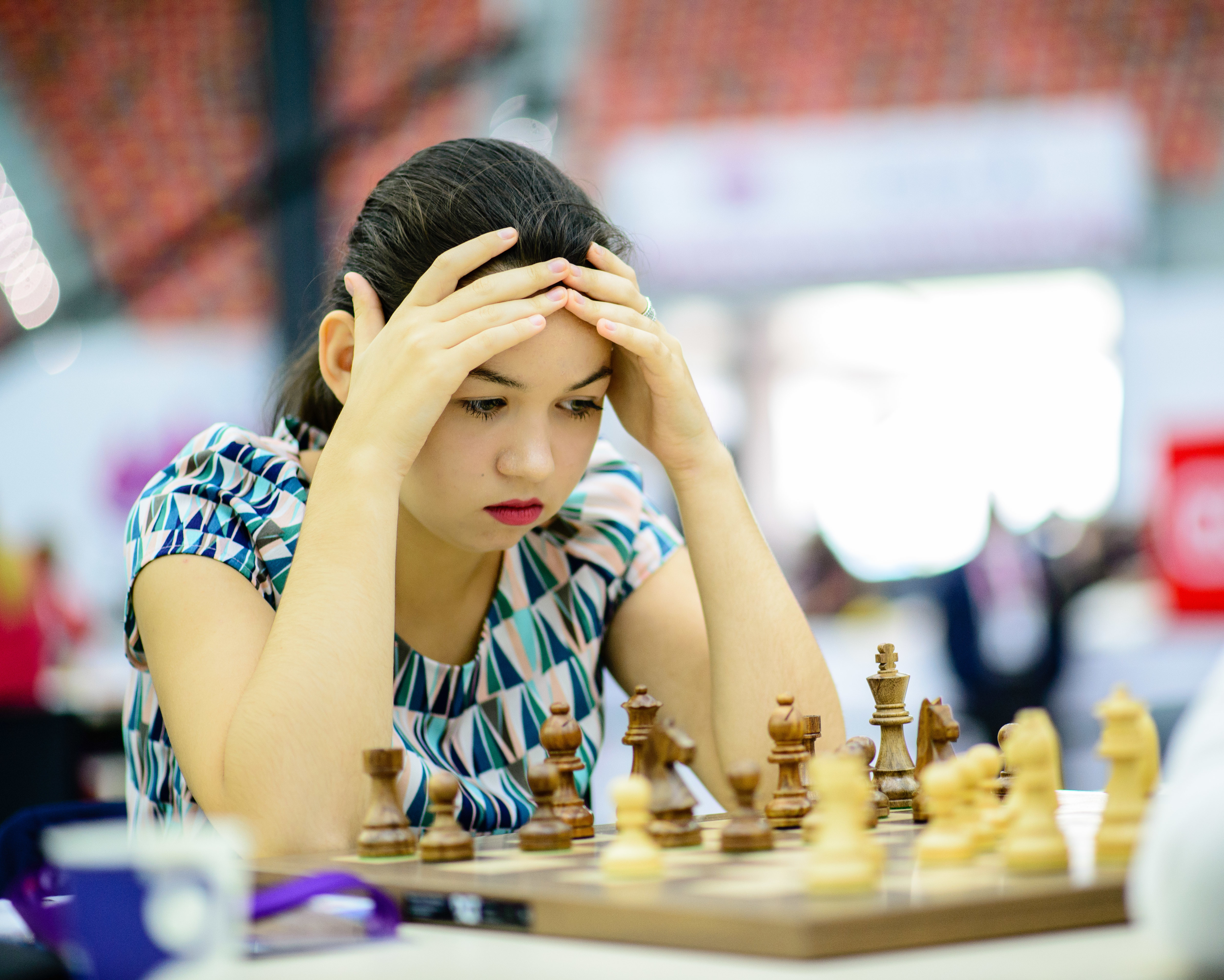
Goryachkina at the 2016 Chess Olympiad

Goryachkina has represented Russia in the women's events at the European Team Championship, the World Team Championship, and the Chess Olympiad. She made her debut on the national women's team on the reserve board at the 2013 European Team Chess Championship, scoring 2½/5 to help Russian win a silver medal behind Ukraine. Her next major national team event was the 2015 Women's World Team Championship, where she scored 5/7 to earn a silver medal on the fourth board. Russia also won the silver medal at the competition behind Georgia. Later in the year, she played the third board at the Women's European Team Championship, winning both individual and team gold medals.

Goryachkina made her Chess Olympiad debut in 2016 on the third board. She did not have a good performance, scoring 4.5/9 for a performance rating of 2328 as Russian finished one spot out of the medals. In her second World Team Championship in 2017, Goryachkina won her first team gold at the event, playing fourth board behind Alexandra Kosteniuk, Kateryna Lagno, and Valentina Gunina. She won a bronze medal on the fourth board. Russia won another gold medal at the European Team Championship later in the year, with Goryachkina again playing on the fourth board.

For the second consecutive Chess Olympiad, Russia finished in fourth place in 2018. Nonetheless, Goryachkina won a medal this time, winning the bronze on the second board while playing behind only Kosteniuk. At the 2019 World Team Championship, Russia won the silver medal behind China. Despite that runner-up, Russia won their third consecutive European Team Championship at their next event. Goryachkina played on the top board for Russia for the first time, placing fifth individually on the top board.

=== National events ===
Goryachkina has also represented her region YaNAO at the Russian Team Championship. They did not have any good results from 2013 to 2015, finishing in last place in 2014 and 2015. Goryachkina played on third board in each of those years, and performed well in 2015 with a performance rating of 2638. She only played the women's event the following year on the top board for Belorechensk, and her team finished sixth out of nine teams. Goryachkina next played for YaNAO in the Higher League of the 2019 Team Championship, where she scored 6/8 and had a performance rating of 2670 on the top board to lead her team back to the Premier League.

== Historical achievements ==
Goryachkina is the fourth-highest rated woman in chess history, having reached a peak FIDE rating of 2611 in August 2021. The only women to have been rated higher than her are Judit Polgár, Hou Yifan, and Koneru Humpy in order of rating. She is also the highest-rated Russian woman in chess history, ahead of sisters Nadezhda and Tatiana Kosintseva who had peak FIDE ratings of 2576 and 2581 respectively.

== Playing style ==
Goryachkina prefers playing 1.d4 (the Queen's Pawn Game) with the white pieces, utilizing this opening in more than half of her games. Her most frequent openings with 1.d4 are the Queen's Gambit Declined (1.d4 d5 2.c4 e6) and the Catalan (1.d4 Nf6 2.c4 e6 3.g3). With the black pieces, Goryachkina most commonly defends 1.d4 with the Slav (1.d4 d5 2.c4 c6) and commonly defends 1.e4 with the Caro-Kann (1.e4 c6).

== Personal life ==
Outside of playing in tournaments, Goryachkina is very involved in teaching chess. She works at her father's chess school in Salekhard as an assistant librarian and also gives masterclasses. In the past, she taught online through Discord. Although she has since primarily taught in person, she remains active on the platform in order to improve her English skills. Goryachkina is passionate about cosmetology and classical music.

== Notable game ==
Ali Marandi vs. Goryachkina, Győr 2014

Position: e1 white king, c1 white rook, f2 white rook, e2 white bishop, d2 white bishop, c2 white queen, b2 white pawn, a2 white pawn, g3 black queen, e3 white pawn, c3 white knight, h4 black bishop, g4 white pawn, c5 white pawn, g6 black pawn, e6 black pawn, c6 black knight, a6 black pawn, g7 black pawn, f7 black pawn, b7 black pawn, e8 black king, d8 black rook

Position after 16. Be2 Rxh2 17. Rxh2 Qxg3+ 18. Rf2 Ng4 19. fxg4 Bh4
- Cemil Can Ali Marandi (2423) – Aleksandra Goryachkina (2441), 2014 World Youth Chess Olympiad (under-16): Round 7; Slav defence, 0–1. GM Mihail Marin commented, "Even though the combination in this game is not entirely sound, we decided to award it with a brilliancy prize for Black's ambition and courage." Some of Marin's annotations are included below.

1.d4 d5 2.c4 c6 3.Nf3 Nf6 4.e3 Bf5 5.Nc3 e6 6.Nh4 Be4 7.f3 Bg6 8.Qb3 Qc7 9.Bd2 Be7 10.Nxg6 hxg6 11.g3 a6 12.Rc1 dxc4 13.Bxc4 c5 14.dxc5 Nc6 15.Qc2 Rd8 16.Be2 Rxh2 17.Rxh2 Qxg3+ 18.Rf2 Ng4 19.fxg4 Bh4 ("Black has dangerous initiative, but has paid a huge price for it: a rook and a knight.") 20.Kd1? ("Returning the rook too easily. True, White's position looks cramped after 20.Nd1 Qg1+ 21.Bf1 Ne5, but the accurate 22.Qe4, defending the f3 square, would have left her short of adequate ways of continuing the attack.") Qxf2 21.Qe4 Qe1+! ("White must have overlooked this simple move when playing 20.Kd1?") 22.Kc2 Qxd2+ 23.Kb1 Bg5 ("Black has retrieved all the sacrificed material retaining a won position.") 24.Bxa6 Qxe3 25.Qxe3 Bxe3 26.Bxb7 Na5 27.Ba6 Bxc1 28.Kxc1 Rd4 29.Be2 Kd7 30.Kc2 Nb7 31.Bb5+ Kd8 32.Na4 Rxg4 33.Kc3 f5 34.b4 f4 35.Kd3 g5 36.Ba6 Kc7 37.Nc3 Rg3+ 38.Kd4 e5+ 39.Kc4 f3 40.Nd5+ Kd7 41.Kb5 Nd8 42.Kb6 f2 43.Bb5+ Ke6 44.c6 Nxc6 45.Kxc6 e4 46.Bc4 Ke5 47.b5 Rg1 48.b6 Rc1 49.b7 Rxc4+ 50.Kd7 f1Q 51.b8Q+ Kd4 52.Ne7 Qh3+ 53.Kd6 Qh2+ 0–1

== See also ==
- List of female chess grandmasters
- Women in chess
