= Frederik Svane =

German chess grandmaster (born 2004)

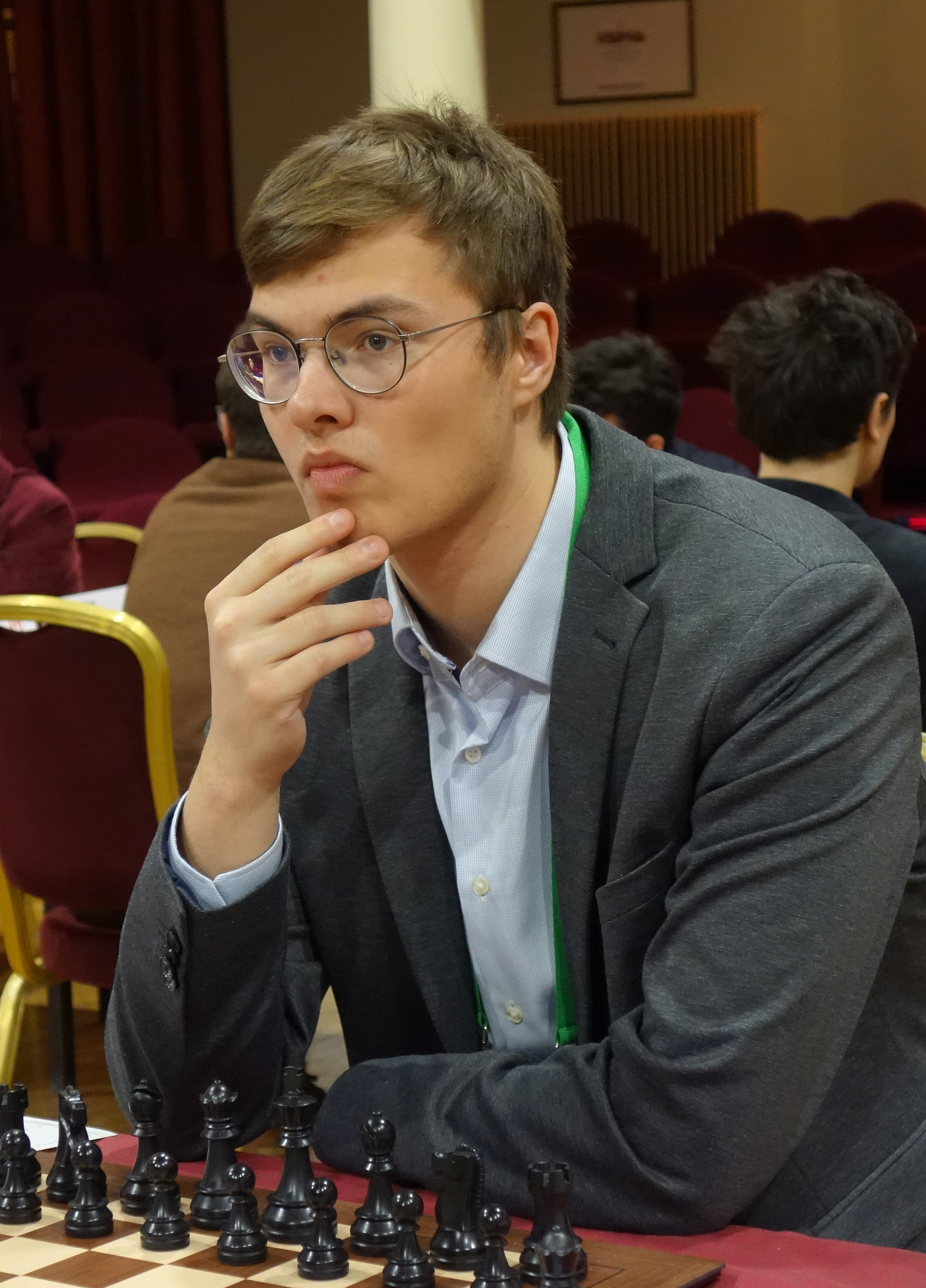
- Svane in 2023

Personal information
- Born: January 21, 2004 (age 22) Lübeck, Germany
- Relatives: Troels Svane (father); Rasmus Svane (brother)

Chess career
- Country: Germany
- Title: Grandmaster (2022)
- FIDE rating: 2662 (October 2026)
- Peak rating: 2671 (May 2025)
- Ranking: No. 51 (October 2026)
- Peak ranking: No. 52 (May 2025)

Frederik Svane (born January 21, 2004) is a German chess grandmaster.

== Chess career ==
Svane's older brother is Rasmus Svane. At age four, Frederik joined a chess club and began learning and playing against Rasmus.

In December 2020, Svane won the World Online Junior U16 Championship.

In April 2021, Svane, then a FIDE Master, defeated grandmaster Matthias Blübaum (then the top-rated German player) in a surprise upset in the Kader Challenge, a tournament for top-level German chess players.

In October 2021, Svane achieved his first GM norm by finishing in second place at a round-robin in Kiel, Germany.

In May 2022, he obtained two GM norms in less than one day by finishing second in a closed GM tournament held by the Hamburg Chess Club with a performance rating of 2607, and then drawing against Eduardas Rozentalis in the Hamburg Invitational.

In October 2022, he had a strong standing in the World Junior Chess Championship.

Svane played in the Chess World Cup 2023, where he defeated Lee Jun Hyeok in the first round, but was defeated by Ivan Cheparinov in the second round.

At his Chess Olympiad debut in 2024, he earned an individual gold medal, scoring 8/9 on board five. Later that year, he finished the European Individual Championship in third place.

In 2025, Frederick knocked out the reigning World Champion Gukesh Dommaraju in Round 3 of the Chess World Cup 2025 held in Goa, India. He then defeated Shant Sargsyan in the fourth round, before losing to eventual winner Javokhir Sindarov in the fifth round.

At the Chess Olympiad 2026 Svane won another individual gold medal, this time on board three. He achieved a score of 8.5/11 with a tournament performance rating of 2796.
