= FIDE Women's Grand Prix 2022–23 =

Women's chess tournament series

FIDE Women's Grand Prix Series 2022-23
Tournament information
- Sport: Chess
- Location: Kazakhstan; Germany; India; Cyprus
- Dates: September 2022–May 2023
- Administrator: FIDE
- Format: Series of round-robin tournaments

Final positions
- Champion: Kateryna Lagno
- Runner-up: Aleksandra Goryachkina

The 2022–2023 edition of the FIDE Women's Grand Prix was a series of four chess tournaments exclusively for women which determined two players to play in the Women's Candidates Tournament 2024. The winner of the Candidates Tournament played the reigning world champion in the Women's World Chess Championship 2025.

The 2022–2023 edition was the sixth cycle of the tournament series. Each of 16 players had to participate in three out of four tournaments, and every tournament was a twelve-player round robin event. The tournaments were held between September 2022 and May 2023.

Kateryna Lagno and Aleksandra Goryachkina were the top two finishers of the series, and qualified to play in the Women's Candidates Tournament 2024.

== Players ==
16 players qualified for the Grand Prix:

- Women's World Chess Champion.
- Four semifinalists of Women's Chess World Cup 2021.
- The top 4 finishers in the FIDE Women's Grand Swiss Tournament 2021, excluding those who already qualified for the Grand Prix.
- 3 players with highest rating in the March 2022 rating list, who played at least 1 rated game counted in one of the Standard FIDE Rating Lists from April 2021 to March 2022 (Humpy Koneru was not eligible because of this condition), excluding those who already qualified for the Grand Prix.
- 4 organizer's nominees.

After Ju Wenjun (Women's World Champion), Lei Tingjie (winner of Women's Grand Swiss) and Hou Yifan (qualified by rating as #1) decided not to participate, replacements were also invited by March 2022 rating list.

Invitee	Qualifying method	Rating (March 2022)
(Switzerland) Alexandra Kosteniuk	Women's World Cup	2516
(FIDE) Aleksandra Goryachkina (Note: Russian players' flags are displayed as the FIDE flag because FIDE banned Russian and Belarusian flags from FIDE-rated events in response to the 2022 Russian invasion of Ukraine.)	Women's World Cup	2610
(China) Tan Zhongyi	Women's World Cup	2525
(Ukraine) Anna Muzychuk	Women's World Cup	2531
(Germany) Elisabeth Pähtz	Women's Grand Swiss	2507
(China) Zhu Jiner	Women's Grand Swiss	2464
(Ukraine) Mariya Muzychuk	Women's Grand Swiss	2544
(FIDE) Kateryna Lagno	Rating	2550
(Georgia (country)) Nana Dzagnidze	Rating	2531
(Kazakhstan) Bibisara Assaubayeva	Organizer's nominee	2434
(Germany) Dinara Wagner	Organizer's nominee	2325
(India) Koneru Humpy	Organizer's nominee	2586 (Note: Inactive rating)
(Poland) Alina Kashlinskaya	Organizer's nominee	2490
(India) Dronavalli Harika	Rating (replacement)	2517
(FIDE) Polina Shuvalova	Rating (replacement)	2504
(Kazakhstan) Zhansaya Abdumalik	Rating (replacement)	2493
(India) R Vaishali (Note: Replaced Koneru Humpy in the first leg after her withdrawal for medical reasons. Later replaced a Muzychuk sister in India.)	Replacement	2403
(Georgia (country)) Nino Batsiashvili (Note: Replaced a Muzychuk sister in India.)	Replacement	2472
(Georgia (country)) Bella Khotenashvili (Note: Replaced a Muzychuk sister in Nicosia.)	Replacement	2485
(Azerbaijan) Gunay Mammadzada	Replacement	2454
(Poland) Oliwia Kiołbasa (Note: Replaced Alina Kashlinskaya in Nicosia.)	Replacement	2388

== Schedule ==
No.	Host city	Date	Winner	Points (Win/draw/loss)
1	Astana, Kazakhstan	17–30 September 2022	(FIDE) Kateryna Lagno	8/11 (+5=6-0)
2	Munich, Germany	1–14 February 2023	(Switzerland) Alexandra Kosteniuk	7.5/11 (+5=5-1)
3	New Delhi, India	24 March – 6 April 2023	(FIDE) Aleksandra Goryachkina (Note: Goryachkina tied with Bibisara Assaubayeva and Zhu Jiner for first place, but was the winner after tiebreaks.)	6/9 (+3=6-0)
4	Nicosia, Cyprus	15–28 May 2023	(Germany) Dinara Wagner	7/11 (+4=6-1)

== Crosstables ==
=== Astana ===
Pos	Player	Pld	Score	KL (FIDE)	AG (FIDE)	JZ (CHN)	AKo (SUI)	ZA (KAZ)	ZT (CHN)	DW (GER)	RV (IND)	AKa (POL)	BA (KAZ)	EP (GER)	PS (FIDE)
1	Kateryna Lagno (FIDE)	11	8	—	½	1	½	½	1	1	½	½	½	1	1
2	Aleksandra Goryachkina (FIDE)	11	7 ^{1}/_{2}	½	—	1	½	½	1	½	½	1	½	½	1
3	Jiner Zhu (CHN)	11	6 ^{1}/_{2}	0	0	—	½	1	½	1	½	1	½	½	1
4	Alexandra Kosteniuk (SUI)	11	6	½	½	½	—	1	1	0	1	½	0	1	0
5	Zhansaya Abdumalik (KAZ)	11	5 ^{1}/_{2}	½	½	0	0	—	½	½	½	1	½	½	1
6-8	Zhongyi Tan (CHN)	11	5	0	0	½	0	½	—	1	½	1	1	½	0
6-8	Dinara Wagner (GER)	11	5	0	½	0	1	½	0	—	½	1	½	0	1
6-8	R Vaishali (IND)	11	5	½	½	½	0	½	½	½	—	0	½	1	½
9-11	Alina Kashlinskaya (POL)	11	4 ^{1}/_{2}	½	0	0	½	0	0	0	1	—	1	½	1
9-11	Bibisara Assaubayeva (KAZ)	11	4 ^{1}/_{2}	½	½	½	1	½	0	½	½	0	—	0	½
9-11	Elisabeth Paehtz (GER)	11	4 ^{1}/_{2}	0	½	½	0	½	½	1	0	½	1	—	0
12	Polina Shuvalova (FIDE)	11	4	0	0	0	1	0	1	0	½	0	½	1	—

Updated to match(es) played on 29 September 2022. Source: https://womengrandprix.fide.com/astana2022/standings

=== Munich ===
Pos	Player	Pld	Score	AKo (SUI)	HK (IND)	ND (GEO)	HD (IND)	EP (GER)	ZT (CHN)	ZA (KAZ)	JZ (CHN)	MM (UKR)	AKa (POL)	AM (UKR)	DW (GER)
1	Alexandra Kosteniuk (SUI)	11	7 ^{1}/_{2}	—	½	½	½	1	1	½	0	½	1	1	1
2	Humpy Koneru (IND)	11	7	½	—	½	½	1	½	½	½	½	1	1	½
3	Nana Dzagnidze (GEO)	11	6 ^{1}/_{2}	½	½	—	½	0	1	1	½	½	1	½	½
4	Harika Dronavalli (IND)	11	6	½	½	½	—	½	½	½	½	½	½	1	½
5-8	Elisabeth Paehtz (GER)	11	5 ^{1}/_{2}	0	0	1	½	—	½	½	½	½	½	½	1
5-8	Zhongyi Tan (CHN)	11	5 ^{1}/_{2}	0	½	0	½	½	—	½	1	½	½	1	½
5-8	Zhansaya Abdumalik (KAZ)	11	5 ^{1}/_{2}	½	½	0	½	½	½	—	0	1	½	½	1
5-8	Jiner Zhu (CHN)	11	5 ^{1}/_{2}	1	½	½	½	½	0	1	—	0	0	½	1
9	Mariya Muzychuk (UKR)	11	5	½	½	½	½	½	½	0	1	—	0	½	½
10	Alina Kashlinskaya (POL)	11	4 ^{1}/_{2}	0	0	0	½	½	½	½	1	1	—	½	0
11	Anna Muzychuk (UKR)	11	4	0	0	½	0	½	0	½	½	½	½	—	1
12	Dinara Wagner (GER)	11	3 ^{1}/_{2}	0	½	½	½	0	½	0	0	½	1	0	—

Updated to match(es) played on 14 February 2023. Source: https://womengrandprix.fide.com/munich2023/standings

=== New Delhi ===
Pos	Player	Pld	Score	JZ (CHN)	BA (KAZ)	AG (FIDE)	PS (FIDE)	KL (FIDE)	HK (IND)	ND (GEO)	NB (GEO)	HD (IND)	RV (IND)
1-3	Jiner Zhu (CHN)	9	6	—	½	½	½	1	1	½	½	½	1
1-3	Bibisara Assaubayeva (KAZ)	9	6	½	—	0	1	½	½	½	1	1	1
1-3	Aleksandra Goryachkina (FIDE)	9	6	½	1	—	½	½	½	½	1	1	½
4-5	Polina Shuvalova (FIDE)	9	5	½	0	½	—	½	½	1	0	1	1
4-5	Kateryna Lagno (FIDE)	9	5	0	½	½	½	—	½	1	½	½	1
6	Humpy Koneru (IND)	9	4 ^{1}/_{2}	0	½	½	½	½	—	1	½	½	½
7-9	Nana Dzagnidze (GEO)	9	3 ^{1}/_{2}	½	½	½	0	0	0	—	½	½	1
7-9	Nino Batsiashvili (GEO)	9	3 ^{1}/_{2}	½	0	0	1	½	½	½	—	0	½
7-9	Harika Dronavalli (IND)	9	3 ^{1}/_{2}	½	0	0	0	½	½	½	1	—	½
10	R Vaishali (IND)	9	2	0	0	½	0	0	½	0	½	½	—

Updated to match(es) played on 6 April 2023. Source: https://womengrandprix.fide.com/newdelhi2023/standings

The tournament only had 11 players after Abdumalik withdrew in protest of the playing venue and her accommodations. FIDE stated they were unable to adjust the pairings or add another player to try to reduce the number of players with 6 whites and 4 blacks or vice versa. Harika stated that many of the players were resistant to another player being added as there were already 3 Indian participants and a reserved player would likely have to also be Indian given the tournament was held in New Delhi and that Goryachkina threatened to withdraw if the pairings were adjusted. Paehtz then withdrew as well in protest of the color imbalances. As a result, the tournament was still held over the original 11 rounds with each player now receiving two byes, and colors were still not adjusted, leaving Zhu and Shuvalova to have 6 white games and Batsiashvili and Harika to have 6 black games.

=== Nicosia ===
Pos	Player	Pld	Score	DW (GER)	HD (IND)	PS (FIDE)	TZ (CHN)	KL (FIDE)	ND (GEO)	GM (AZE)	AG (FIDE)	BA (KAZ)	AK (FIDE)	BK (GEO)	OK (POL)
1	Dinara Wagner (GER)	11	7	—	½	½	½	1	½	0	1	½	½	1	1
2-4	Harika Dronavalli (IND)	11	6 ^{1}/_{2}	½	—	½	½	½	½	½	½	1	½	½	1
2-4	Polina Shuvalova (FIDE)	11	6 ^{1}/_{2}	½	½	—	½	0	½	1	½	1	½	½	1
2-4	Zhongyi Tan (CHN)	11	6 ^{1}/_{2}	½	½	½	—	½	½	½	½	½	1	½	1
5	Kateryna Lagno (FIDE)	11	6	0	½	1	½	—	½	1	½	½	½	½	½
6-9	Nana Dzagnidze (GEO)	11	5 ^{1}/_{2}	½	½	½	½	½	—	½	0	½	0	1	1
6-9	Gunay Mammadzada (AZE)	11	5 ^{1}/_{2}	1	½	0	½	0	½	—	½	½	½	½	1
6-9	Aleksandra Goryachkina (FIDE)	11	5 ^{1}/_{2}	0	½	½	½	½	1	½	—	½	½	0	1
6-9	Bibisara Assaubayeva (KAZ)	11	5 ^{1}/_{2}	½	0	0	½	½	½	½	½	—	1	1	½
10	Alexandra Kosteniuk (FIDE)	11	5	½	½	½	0	½	1	½	½	0	—	½	½
11	Bella Khotenashvili (GEO)	11	4 ^{1}/_{2}	0	½	½	½	½	0	½	1	0	½	—	½
12	Oliwia Kiołbasa (POL)	11	2	0	0	0	0	½	0	0	0	½	½	½	—

Updated to match(es) played on 27 May 2023. Source: https://womengrandprix.fide.com/standings

== Grand Prix standings ==
For each tournament, 160 Grand Prix points were awarded for 1st place, 130 for 2nd, 110 for 3rd and then in steps of 10 from 90 for 4th to 10 for 12th place. If players ended up tied on points, points for those places were shared equally.

The top two players in Grand Prix standings qualified for the Women's Candidates Tournament 2023–2024.

All replacements (in italics) were eligible for Grand Prix points and Candidates qualification.

Rank	Player	Astana	Munich	New Delhi	Nicosia	Total	Prize money
1	Kateryna Lagno (FIDE)	160		85	80	325	€49,125
2	Aleksandra Goryachkina (FIDE)	130		133⅓	55	318⅓	€45,146
3	Zhu Jiner (CHN)	110	65	133⅓		308⅓	€40,833
4	Alexandra Kosteniuk (SUI)	90	160		30	280	€37,000
5	Harika Dronavalli (IND)		90	50	110	250	€30,500
6	Tan Zhongyi (CHN)	60	65		110	235	€26,083
7	Dinara Wagner (GER)	60	10		160	230	€26,583
8	Bibisara Assaubayeva (KAZ)	30		133⅓	55	218⅓	€23,646
9	Nana Dzagnidze (GEO)		110	50	55	215	€19,313
10	Polina Shuvalova (FIDE)	10		85	110	205	€19,875
11	Koneru Humpy (IND)		130	70		200	€17,750
12	Zhansaya Abdumalik (KAZ)	80	65	w/d		145	€12,250
13	Elisabeth Pähtz (GER)	30	65	w/d		95	€9,000
14	R Vaishali (IND)	60		30		90	€8,583
15	Alina Kashlinskaya (POL)	30	30			60	€7,000
16	Gunay Mammadzada (AZE)				55	55	€4,813
17	Nino Batsiashvili (GEO)			50		50	€4,500
18	Mariya Muzychuk (UKR)		40			40	€4,000
19	Anna Muzychuk (UKR)		20			20	€3,000
19	Bella Khotenashvili (GEO)				20	20	€3,000
21	Oliwia Kiołbasa (POL)				10	10	€2,500
