= Dennis Wagner (chess player) =

German chess grandmaster (born 1997)

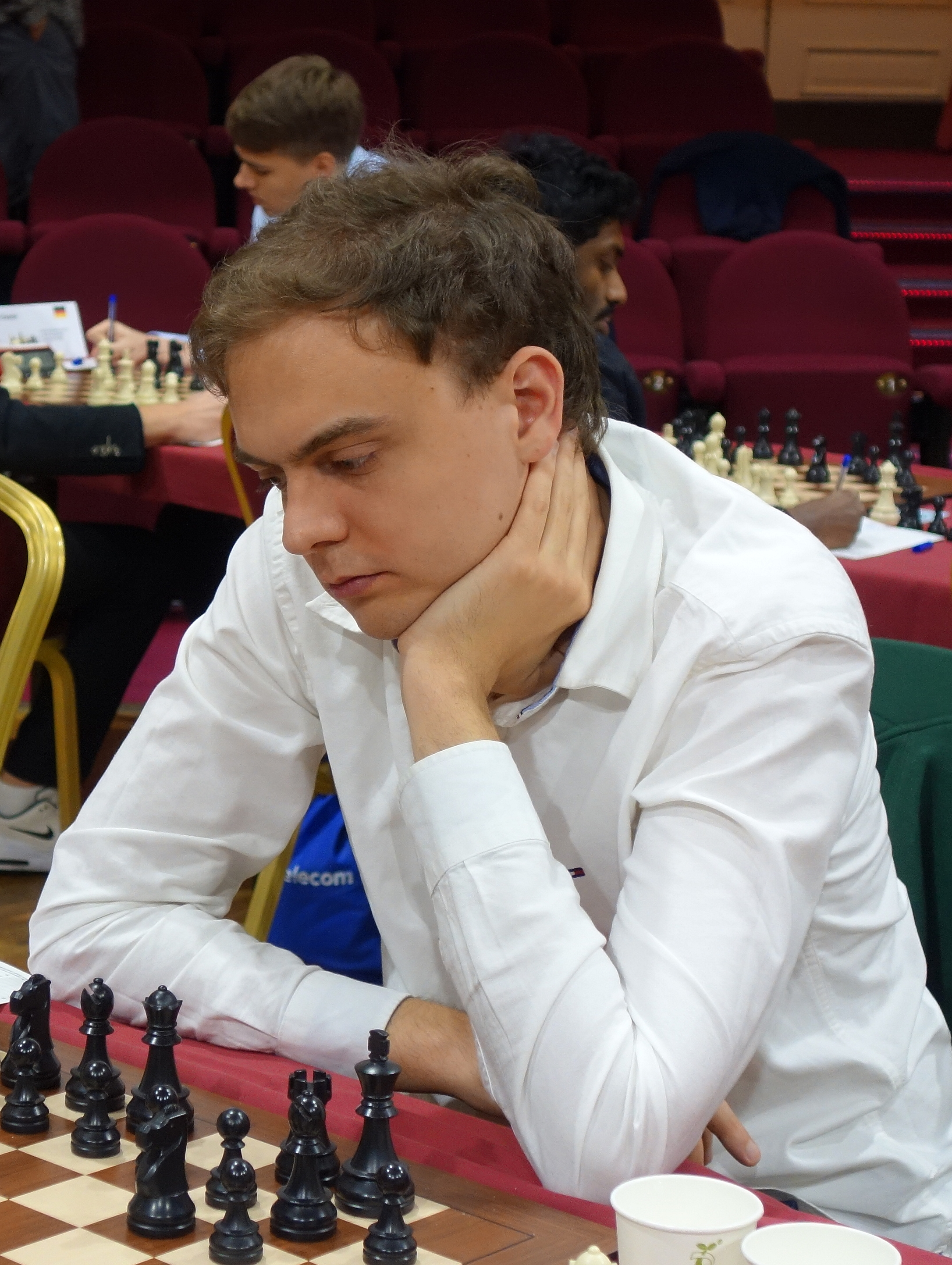
- Dennis Wagner in 2023

Personal information
- Born: 19 June 1997 (age 29) Kassel, Germany
- Spouse: Dinara Dordzhieva (m. 2022)

Chess career
- Country: Germany
- Title: Grandmaster (2015)
- FIDE rating: 2580 (October 2026)
- Peak rating: 2620 (March 2024)

Dennis Joel Wagner (born 19 June 1997) is a German chess grandmaster.

== Chess career ==
Born in 1997, Wagner won the U10 German Chess Championship in 2007. He competed in the World U12 Chess Championship in 2008, placing ninth. He won the U12 German Chess Championship in 2009. He also placed second in the U14 German Chess Championship in 2010, and second in the U16 German Chess Championship in 2011. In December 2011, he won the Paderborn Cup, scoring 6½/7 (+6–0=1) for a performance rating of over 2700.

He earned his international master title in June 2012 and in November participated in the World U16 Chess Championship, finishing sixth. He finished second in the German Chess Championship in November 2014 and in December achieved the final norm needed for his grandmaster title. He was officially awarded the title in 2015. At the 2015 Gibraltar Open, held from 27 January to 5 February 2015, he scored 7½/10 (+6–1=3) for a performance rating of 2757. In November, he played on board 5 for Germany at the European Team Chess Championship, scoring 3½/6 (+1–0=5).

He is the No. 17 ranked German player as of November 2017. In March 2018, he competed in the European Individual Chess Championship. He placed one-hundred-and-fifty-second, scoring 5½/11 (+3–3=5).

In 2022, he married fellow chess player Dinara Dordzhieva.

== Honours ==
Wagner was named the U14 Player of the Year of 2007, 2008 and 2009 by the German Chess Federation, and the U20 Player of the Year of 2012 and 2014.
