= Rasmus Svane =

German chess grandmaster (born 1997)

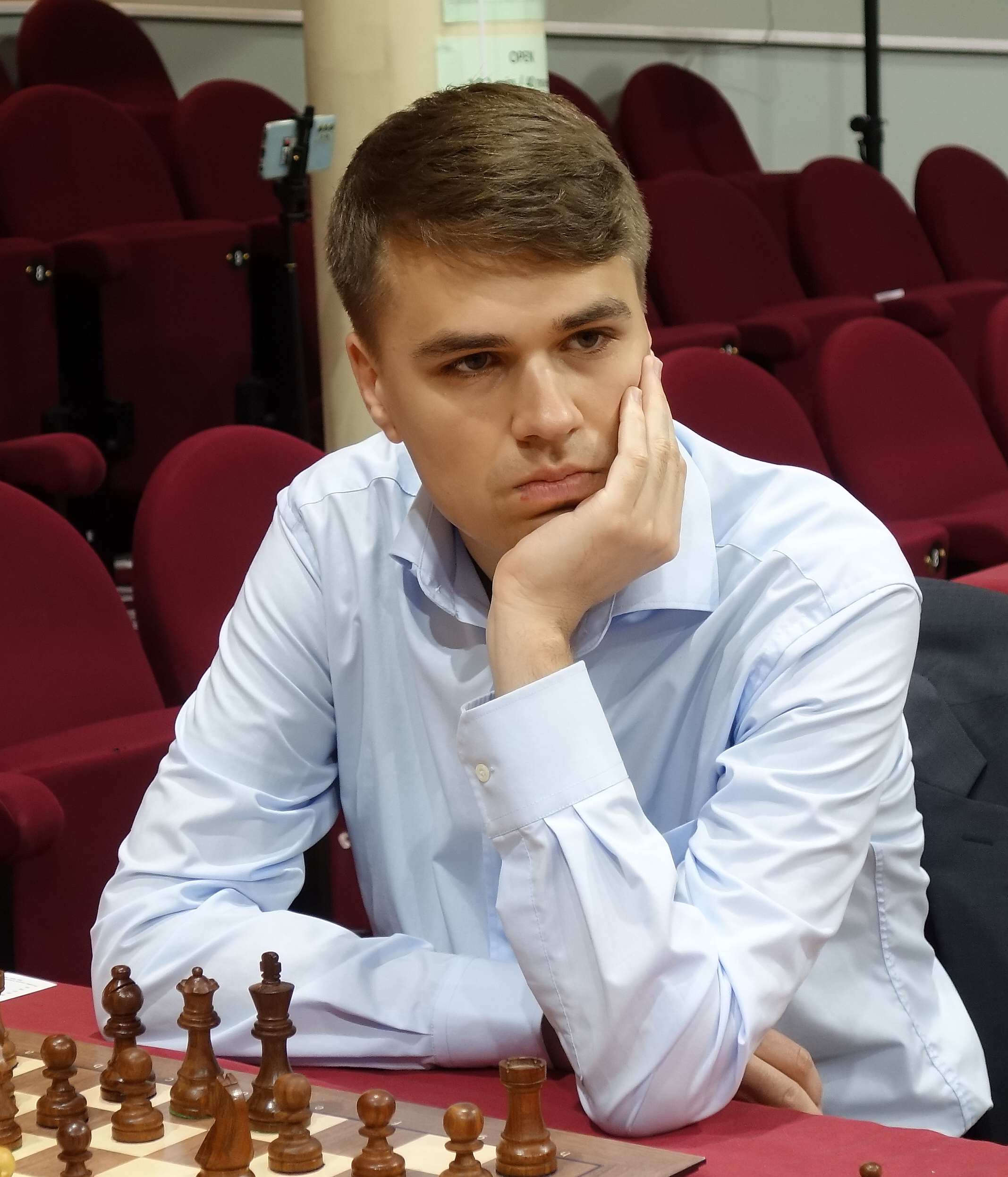
- Svane in 2023

Personal information
- Born: 21 May 1997 (age 29) Allerød Municipality, Denmark
- Relatives: Troels Svane (father); Frederik Svane (brother)

Chess career
- Country: Germany
- Title: Grandmaster (2016)
- FIDE rating: 2621 (October 2026)
- Peak rating: 2651 (May 2022)
- Peak ranking: No. 96 (October 2023)

Rasmus Ingermann Svane (born 21 May 1997) is a Danish-born chess grandmaster who lives in Lübeck, Germany. He has represented Germany at the European Team Chess Championship and the Chess Olympiad. As of September 2026, he is Germany's sixth highest-rated player.

== Personal life ==
Svane was born in Allerød Municipality, Denmark. He is a son of the Danish cellist Troels Svane, and Danish is his first language. Svane has a younger brother, Frederik (born 2004), who is also a chess grandmaster.

Svane received his Abitur in 2016, and when asked in 2017 what he plans to do if a career as a professional chess player does not work out he stated he can return to his studies.

== Chess career ==
Svane learned to play chess at the age of 4 after discovering a chess CD in a cereal packet. He finished second at the German U12 Chess Championship in 2009, and won the German U14 Chess Championship in 2010. He was named the 2010 U14 Player of the Year by the German Chess Federation in recognition of the latter achievement.

Svane earned his first international master (IM) norm at the 2011 German Chess Championship, scoring 5/9. He earned his second and third IM norms in 2012. The former came at the Politiken Cup held in July–August, where he scored 7½/10; the latter was achieved at the 1st Korbach GM tournament in December, with a score of 7/11. He was officially awarded the title by FIDE in May 2013.

He earned his first grandmaster (GM) norm at the 2015 Aeroflot Open, scoring 4½/9. He earned his second at the 2015 Visma GM tournament, scoring 6/9, and attained the final norm during the 2015/2016 Chess Bundesliga season, scoring 6/10. He was awarded his GM title in September 2016, at age 19.

From 28 October to 6 November 2017, he competed for Germany on board 4 at the European Team Chess Championship, scoring 5½/7 (+5–1=1) for a performance rating of 2762. This was the second-best board 4 performance at the tournament, behind Rauf Mamedov's 2920 performance. From 13 to 25 November, he competed at the World Junior Chess Championship. He placed joint eighth (seventeenth on tiebreak) with a score of 7½/11 (+6–2=3), one point behind the winner Aryan Tari.

From 23 January to 1 February 2018, Svane competed in the Tradewise Gibraltar Masters. He finished forty-first, scoring 6½/10 (+4–1=5), one point behind the winner Levon Aronian. From 20 to 28 February, he participated in the Aeroflot Open. He finished forty-seventh out of ninety-two, scoring 4½/9 (+2–2=5). From 17 to 28 March, he competed in the 2018 European Individual Chess Championship. He placed thirty-ninth, scoring 7/11 (+6–3=2). In August, he competed in the Riga Technical University Open. He placed fifth with 7/9 (+5–0=4). Svane represented Germany on the reserve board at the 43rd Chess Olympiad, from 24 September to 5 October. He scored 4½/8 (+3–2=3), as Germany finished 13th.

In 2019, he tied for 2nd-3rd place in the Sunway Sitges Festival with Vasif Durarbayli.

== Notable games ==
- Svane vs Rustam Kasimdzhanov, Bundesliga (20 October 2012), Gruenfeld Defense: Exchange. Modern Exchange Variation (D85), 1–0 Svane, in his first Chess Bundesliga game, defeats the former FIDE World Champion Rustam Kasimdzhanov
- Svane vs Gawain Jones, Bundesliga (2 February 2013), King's Indian Defense: Orthodox Variation. Gligoric-Taimanov System (E92), 1–0 15-year-old Svane defeats the 2641-rated Gawain Jones in 39 moves, sacrificing a rook for a decisive attack in the process
- Alexander Moiseenko vs Svane, Politiken Cup (29 July 2014), Semi-Slav Defense: Accelerated Meran Variation (D45), 0–1 Svane scores his first victory over a 2700+ opponent as he defeats Alexander Moiseenko with the black pieces in 53 moves
- Ernesto Inarkiev vs Svane, Aeroflot Open (4 April 2015), French Defense: Steinitz Variation (C11), 0–1 Svane, as black, defeats the 2706-rated Ernesto Inarkiev in 33 moves
- Svane vs Pentala Harikrishna, Bundesliga (20 November 2016), Catalan Opening: Open Defense (E04), 1–0 Svane defeats the 2762-rated Pentala Harikrishna in 28 moves
