= South Korean Chess Championship =

Chess competition in South Korea

The South Korean Chess Championship (Korean: 전국 체스 선수권 대회, Korea National Championship) is organized by the Korea Chess Federation, which was established in 2008 after FIDE negotiated an agreement between three rival organizations to unify into a single governing body for chess in South Korea.

== Winners ==
No.	Year	Champion
1	2009	Erdem Dashibalov
2	2010	Jang Kyungsik
3	2012	Kim Inguh
4	2013	Ahn Sungmin
5	2014	Lee Jun Hyeok
6	2015	Kim Inguh
7	2016	Martin Walker
8	2017	Lee Jun Hyeok
9	2018	Kwon Sehyun
10	2019	Kwon Sehyun
11	2020	Kwon Sehyun
12	2021	Lee Jun Hyeok
13	2022	Kwon Sehyun
14	2023	Kwon Sehyun
15	2024	Lee Jun Hyeok
16	2025	Isaak Huh
