= Lee Jun-hyeok =

South Korean chess player (born 1999)

Personal information
- Born: October 10, 1999 (age 27)

Chess career
- Country: South Korea
- Title: International Master (2019)
- FIDE rating: 2415 (November 2026)
- Peak rating: 2441 (December 2025)

Lee Jun-hyeok is a South Korean chess player. He is the second highest rated player of his country, only behind grandmaster Alexey Kim.

== Chess career ==
Lee began playing chess at the age of 10. He is the highest-rated South Korean-born chess player and the first one to become an International Master. He has won the South Korean Chess Championship four times: 2014, 2017, 2021, and 2024.

In September 2018, he finished joint-third at the first Laos International Open. He then represented South Korea at the 43rd Chess Olympiad, where he managed a draw against grandmaster Victor Bologan (who was rated over 300 points higher) in the first round.

Lee played in the Chess World Cup 2023, where he was defeated by Frederik Svane in the first round.
