= Alina Kashlinskaya =

Russian chess player (born 1993)

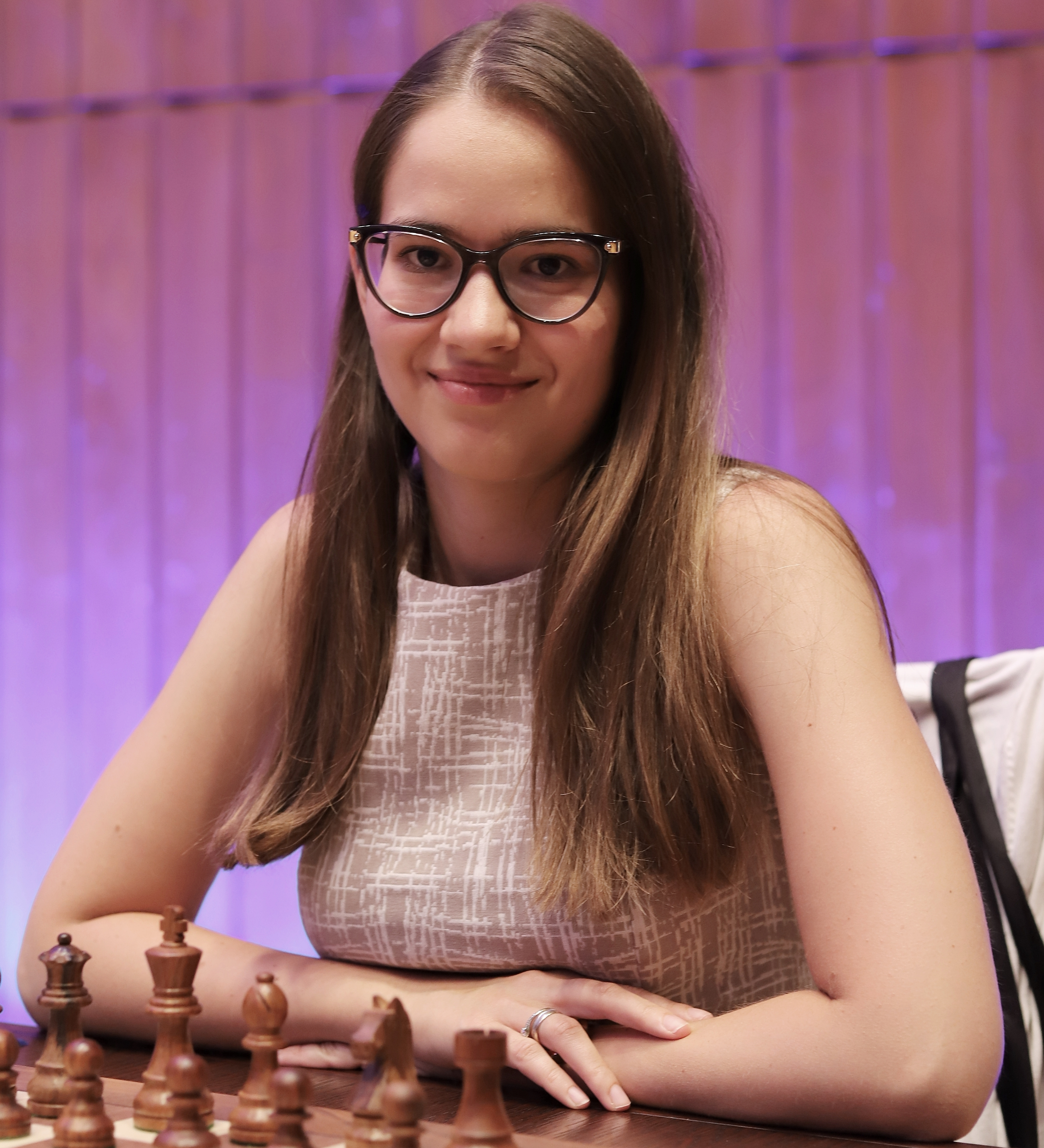
- Kashlinskaya in 2022

Personal information
- Born: 28 October 1993 (age 32) Moscow, Russia
- Spouse: Radosław Wojtaszek

Chess career
- Country: Russia (before May 2022); Poland (since May 2022)
- Title: International Master (2014); Woman Grandmaster (2009)
- FIDE rating: 2474 (July 2026)
- Peak rating: 2505 (June 2022)

Alina Anatolyevna Kashlinskaya (Russian: Алина Анатольевна Кашлинская; born 28 October 1993) is a Russian chess player playing for Poland. She holds the titles International Master and Woman Grandmaster, which FIDE awarded her in 2014 and 2009, respectively. Kashlinskaya is the 2019 European Women's Individual Chess Champion.

== Career ==
In 2003, Kashlinskaya took the silver medal at the European Youth Chess Championships in the Girls U10 category.

In August 2010, she was part of the Russian women's team in the 7th China-Russia Match, held with the Scheveningen system. Kashlinskaya took part in the women's section of the 39th Chess Olympiad playing for Russia B team. She won an individual silver medal playing on board five.

In 2011, Kashlinskaya took silver at the World Youth Chess Championships in the Girls U18 section. The following year, she placed second at the World University Chess Championship in the women's section. Later that year, in December, she took part in the 5th "Snowdrops vs Old Hands" - Czech Coal Match in Poděbrady, held with the double Scheveningen format, that opposed a team of young female players ("Snowdrops") made up of Valentina Gunina, Tania Sachdev, Kashlinskaya and Kristýna Havlíková to veteran Grandmasters ("Old Hands") Vlastimil Hort, Wolfgang Uhlmann, Fridrik Olafsson and Oleg Romanishin. Kashlinskaya scored 3½/8 points.

In 2013, she won the Russian Junior Girls Championship and took the bronze medal in the World Junior Girls Championship. In the same year, Kashlinskaya participated in the 6th "Snowdrops vs Old Hands" match. She scored 5/8 points, helping her team "Snowdrops" (Viktorija Cmilyte, Kashlinskaya, Mariya Muzychuk, Nastassia Ziaziulkina) to defeat the "Old Hands" (Josif Dorfman, Boris Gulko, Borislav Ivkov, Wolfgang Uhlmann) with the overall score of 17½-14½. Kashlinskaya was the top scorer of the whole event.

In March 2015, Kashlinskaya competed in the Women's World Chess Championship for the first time. She was knocked out in the first round by Shen Yang. Two months later, Kashlinskaya took bronze at the Women's European Individual Championship in Chakvi. In July, she took part in the 9th China-Russia Match and scored 2½/5, the best result among the Russians in the women's section. In September, Kashlinskaya won the 5th Krystyna Hołuj-Radzikowska Memorial – Women Grandmaster tournament in Wrocław.

In October 2018, Kashlinskaya won the top women's prize (£7,000) at the Chess.com Isle of Man International, while her husband Wojtaszek won the main prize in the same tournament.

In April 2019, she won the European Women's Individual Championship in Antalya edging out Marie Sebag, Elisabeth Pähtz, Inna Gaponenko and Antoaneta Stefanova on tiebreak score. In October, Kashlinskaya played on the reserve board for the gold winning Russian team at the European Women's Team Chess Championship 2019 in Batumi.

Since 23 May 2022, she has represented Poland instead of Russia. In 2022 she participated with the Polish women's team in the 44th Chess Olympiad, where the team took the sixth place. In 2023 in Warsaw she won bronze medal in Polish Women's Chess Championship. In May 2024, in Rzeszów she shared 1st - 2nd place in Polish Women's Chess Championship and won in play-off to Aleksandra Maltsevskaya - 1,5:0,5 and won gold medal.

In August 2024, Kashlinskaya won the Tbilisi FIDE Women's Grand Prix, securing her second GM Norm in the process. In October, she won the Female player of the Global Chess League 2024 tournament.

== Personal life ==
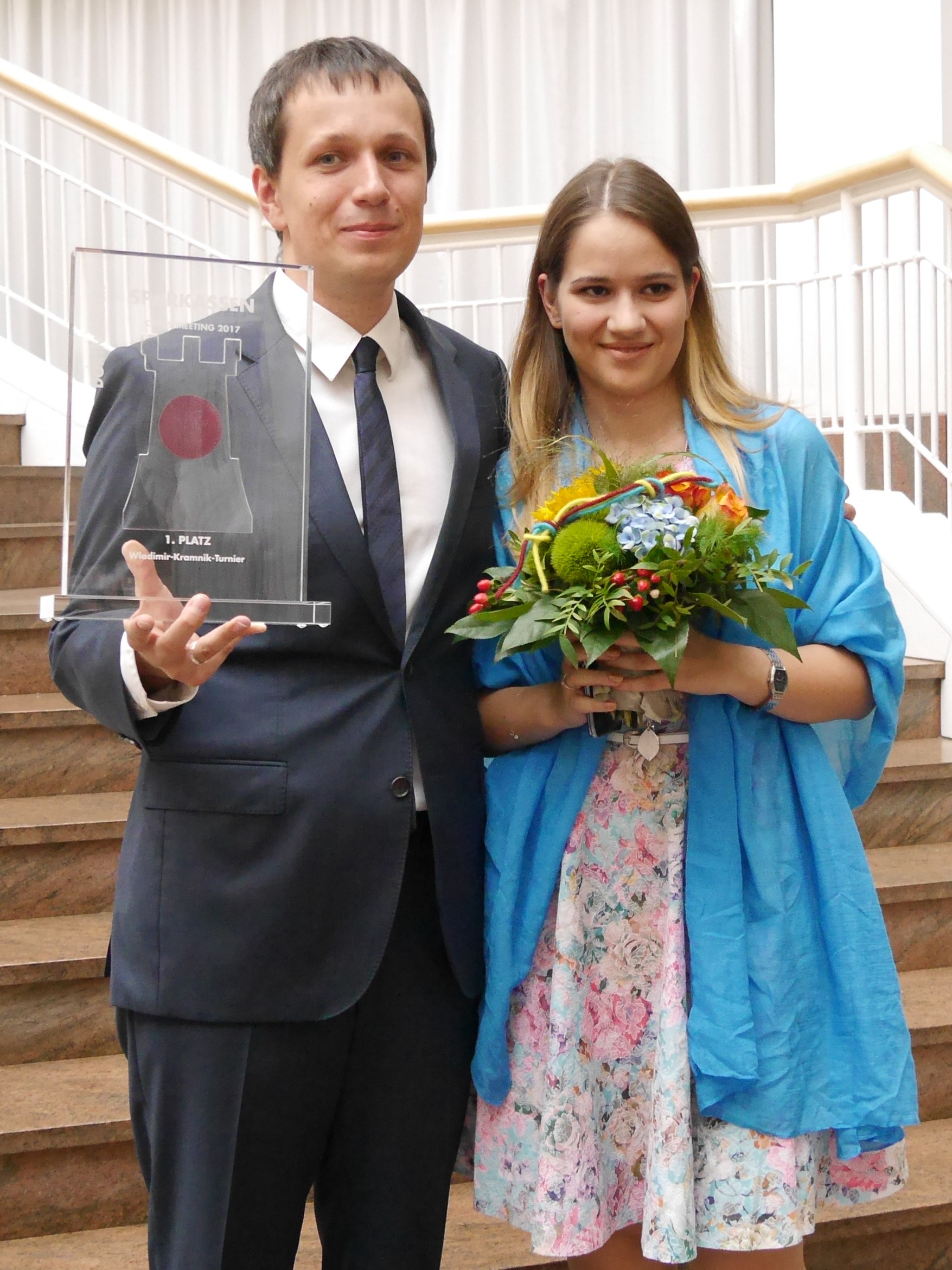
Kashlinskaya and Radosław Wojtaszek (2017 at Dortmund)

Kashlinskaya is married to Radosław Wojtaszek, a Polish Grandmaster. She also holds Polish citizenship. She graduated from the Russian State Social University.
