= Performance rating (chess) =

Player-level assessment

Performance rating (abbreviated as Rp) in chess is the level a player performed at in a tournament or match based on the number of games played, their total score in those games, and the Elo ratings of their opponents. It is the Elo rating a player would have if their performance resulted in no net rating change.

Due to the difficulty of computing performance rating in this manner, however, the linear method and FIDE method for calculating performance rating are in much more widespread use. With these simpler methods, only the average rating (abbreviated as Ra) factors into the calculation instead of the rating of each individual opponent. Regardless of the method, only the total score is used to determine performance rating instead of individual game results. FIDE performance ratings are also used to determine if a player has achieved a norm for FIDE titles such as Grandmaster (GM).

== Definition ==
A player's performance rating in a series of games is the Elo rating a player would need to have to expect to get their actual total score against the opponents they faced in those games. A practical way to understand the performance rating centers around the fact that a player's actual rating changes after each game played. By the definition, the only way a player's actual rating would not change after this series of games is if their rating at the start of these games was already their performance rating over the series. With this definition, individual game results do not directly factor into the calculation. Unlike the linear and FIDE methods, however, the ratings of individual opponents do affect the calculation.

=== Mathematical definition ===
Given a total score $s$ over a series of $n$ games and opponent ratings $R_i (R_1, R_2, ..., R_n)$, the perfect performance rating is the number $R$ where the expected score (calculated from opponent ratings) matches the actual score $s$:

$s=f(R)=\sum_{i}\frac{1}{1+10^{(R_i-R)/400}}$

Note that in the two limiting cases:

- If a player loses all their games ($s = 0$), their performance rating is $R = -\infty$.
- If a player wins all their games ($s = n$), their performance rating is $R = \infty$.

=== Calculation ===
Since $f$ is a monotonically increasing function, we can find $R$ by performing binary search over the domain. We start by setting a reasonable lower and upper bound for ratings (here, 0 to 4000) and then check the expected score at the midpoint (2000). If the actual score is higher than this expectation, it indicates the player's performance was better than 2000, so we repeat the search on the upper half (2000 to 4000, midpoint at 3000). This process repeats until the precise value of $R$ is found.

A sample implementation in Python follows:

def expected_score(opponent_ratings: list[float], own_rating: float) -> float:
    """How many points we expect to score in a tourney with these opponents"""
    return sum(
        1 / (1 + 10**((opponent_rating - own_rating) / 400))
        for opponent_rating in opponent_ratings
    )


def performance_rating(opponent_ratings: list[float], score: float) -> int:
    """Calculate mathematically perfect performance rating with binary search"""
    lo, hi = 0, 4000

    while hi - lo > 0.001:
        mid = (lo + hi) / 2

        if expected_score(opponent_ratings, mid) < score:
            lo = mid
        else:
            hi = mid

    return round(mid)


print(performance_rating([1851, 2457, 1989, 2379, 2407], 4))  # should be 2551

== FIDE performance rating ==
FIDE calculates a player's performance rating $r_p$ as $R_p = R_a + d_p$, where $R_a$ is the average rating of the opponents and $d_p$ is an additional rating difference based on the player's total score divided by the number of rounds played. That fractional score is called $p$, given by the cumulative distribution function of the normal distribution $\Phi\left( \frac{d}{200\sqrt{2}} \right) = \frac{1}{\sqrt{2\pi}}\int_{-\infty}^{\frac{d}{200\sqrt{2}}}e^{-\frac{t^{2}}{2}}dt$, where $d$ represents the difference in rating between a player and their opponent (negative if the opponent has a higher rating).

FIDE provides a lookup table for the values of $d_p$ based on the values of $p$ rounded to the nearest hundredth. The values of $d_p$ for common lengths of tournaments (eight to eleven rounds) are listed below under rating difference examples.

Like the true definition, the FIDE method also does not depend on individual game results. Unlike the true definition, the FIDE method does not depend on individual opponent ratings.

=== Rating difference examples ===
Note: Zero scores have $d_p = -800$, even scores have $d_p = 0$, and perfect scores have $d_p = 800$.

Eight rounds
Negative scores
Score	½	1	1½	2	2½	3	3½
$p$	0.06	0.13	0.19	0.25	0.31	0.37	0.44
$d_p$	−444	−322	−251	−193	−141	−95	−43
Positive scores
Score	4½	5	5½	6	6½	7	7½
$p$	0.56	0.63	0.69	0.75	0.81	0.87	0.94
$d_p$	+43	+95	+141	+193	+251	+322	+444

Nine rounds
Negative scores
Score	½	1	1½	2	2½	3	3½	4
$p$	0.06	0.11	0.17	0.22	0.28	0.33	0.39	0.44
$d_p$	−444	−351	−273	−220	−166	−125	−80	−43
Positive scores
Score	5	5½	6	6½	7	7½	8	8½
$p$	0.56	0.61	0.67	0.72	0.78	0.83	0.89	0.94
$d_p$	+43	+80	+125	+166	+220	+273	+351	+444

Ten rounds
Negative scores
Score	½	1	1½	2	2½	3	3½	4	4½
$p$	0.05	0.10	0.15	0.20	0.25	0.30	0.35	0.40	0.45
$d_p$	−470	−366	−296	−240	−193	−149	−110	−72	−36
Positive scores
Score	5½	6	6½	7	7½	8	8½	9	9½
$p$	0.55	0.60	0.65	0.70	0.75	0.80	0.85	0.90	0.95
$d_p$	+36	+72	+110	+149	+193	+240	+296	+366	+470

Eleven rounds
Negative scores
Score	½	1	1½	2	2½	3	3½	4	4½	5
$p$	0.05	0.09	0.14	0.18	0.23	0.27	0.32	0.36	0.41	0.45
$d_p$	−470	−383	−309	−262	−211	−175	−133	−102	−65	−36
Positive scores
Score	6	6½	7	7½	8	8½	9	9½	10	10½
$p$	0.55	0.59	0.64	0.68	0.73	0.77	0.82	0.86	0.91	0.95
$d_p$	+36	+65	+102	+133	+175	+211	+262	+309	+383	+470

=== Use in norms ===
One of the requirements to earn a FIDE title in a standard manner is to achieve a certain number of norms. A norm in chess is awarded if a player has a performance rating in a tournament at or above a threshold rating. As an example, for the Grandmaster (GM) title, a player must achieve three GM norms corresponding to performance ratings of at least 2600 against opponents with an average rating of 2380 and must also have reached a required peak live rating of 2500. These norms are calculated with the FIDE performance rating method.

=== Use at Chess Olympiads ===
The board medals at the Chess Olympiads are awarded based on the performance ratings achieved by the players. If two or more players have equal performance rating, the number of games played is used as a tie-breaker. In case of another tie, lots are drawn to determine the ranking of the players.

== Linear performance rating ==
Because of the need to have a lookup table to calculate the rating difference $d_p$ in FIDE performance ratings, another simpler method instead calculates the rating difference as $d_p = 800p - 400$, where $p$ is the percentage score in this case. The overall performance rating is then calculated as $R_p = R_a + d_p$, the same as the FIDE method.

An equivalent way to calculate this performance rating is by taking the average of

- Opponent's rating + 400 for each win
- Opponent's rating - 400 for each loss
- Just the opponent's rating for each draw

A notable drawback of this approach is that winning against a low-rated player can actually lower your performance rating.

This method is sometimes called the linear method due to the linear dependence on the percentage score $p$. Like the true definition, the linear method also does not depend on individual game results. Unlike the true definition, the linear method does not depend on individual opponent ratings.

== Comparison between methods ==
Different methods for calculating the performance rating generally give similar results. The only score in which all methods give exactly the same result is an even score against opponents with no skew away from their average rating, in which case the performance rating is the average of the opponents' ratings. There are larger discrepancies closer to zero scores or perfect scores, or a larger variance in the individual ratings (in which case the individual ratings have a larger effect). The true definition of the performance rating gives -∞ for a zero score and ∞ for a perfect score, whereas the other methods yield finite values.

As a specific example, if a player scores 2½/3 against three opponents rated 2400, 2500, and 2600, their performance ratings with the different methods are 2785 (true definition), 2773 (FIDE), and 2767 (linear).
