= Troels Svane =

Danish cellist

Troels Svane (born 1967) is a Danish cellist. He is a part of the Zapolski Quartet. He studied with David Geringas at the Lübeck Academy of Music in Germany. He graduated from the soloist class with distinction and the highest grade in all subjects. He was taught by Anner Bylsma, Frans Helmerson, Ralph Kirshbaum, György Ligeti, Yo-Yo Ma, Siegfried Palm, Boris Pergamenschikow, Mstislav Rostropovich, Daniil Shafran, Paul Tortelier and the Amadeus Quartet.

After high school he was appointed co-principal cellist of the Copenhagen Philharmonic at the age of 18. He won prizes at national and international competitions and received numerous scholarships. As a soloist he has performed with most Danish orchestras and with orchestras in England, Germany, Holland, Italy, Latvia, Lithuania, Sweden and Switzerland.

As a recitalist and member of the Copenhagen Trio and the Menuhin Festival Piano Quartet, Svane played concerts all over Europe, Australia, Asia, South America and the United States. He performed with Yuri Bashmet, Thomas Brandis, Zakhar Bron, Ulf Hoelscher, Karl Leister and the Zehetmair Quartet.

He has recorded more than 40 CDs including the complete works for cello and piano by Beethoven, Rachmaninov and Reger.

Svane was the assistant to David Geringas for 11 years before he was appointed professor for violoncello at the Lübeck Academy of Music in 2004. He has a cello class at the Hochschule für Musik "Hanns Eisler" in Berlin. Svane has given master classes in Australia, Asia, Ukraine, South America and in numerous European countries and was a jury member at international competitions. His students were prize winners at competitions like the Rostropovich Competition in Paris and the ARD International Music Competition in Munich.
