= Development of the Women's World Chess Championship =

The Women's World Chess Championship was established by FIDE in 1927. The format and regularity of the event has changed many times.

== The Championship before World War II (1927–39) ==
The International Chess Federation (FIDE) was founded in 1924 and quickly came up with the idea of taking control of the World Championship, although this did not happen until 1948. The Women's World Championship, however, was a new creation by FIDE and thus held under their auspices from the beginning.

All official Women's Championships except one before World War II were held as round-robin tournaments concurrently with one of the Chess Olympiads, also controlled by FIDE – and all of them were won by the same player: Vera Menchik, by far the dominating figure in this early era of organized women's chess. Menchik, who usually preferred to compete in regular open tournaments against men (and beat several of them), first won the title at the first official Olympiad in London in 1927 and since defended it successfully no less than eight times, six times at subsequent Olympiads (in 1930, 31, 33, 35, 37, and 39, respectively) and twice in matches against Sonja Graf, arguably the second-strongest female player of that era. These matches were arranged largely by the players themselves, much like the open title at the time. The first match (in 1934) was unofficial, while the second one (in 1937) was recognized by FIDE as official.

== Introduction of the Championship cycle (1949–99) ==
Both reigning champions died during or shortly after World War II, Menchik during a bombing raid on her home in England in 1944 and Alexander Alekhine under somewhat suspicious circumstances in early 1946. FIDE promptly seized the opportunity to take control of the open title and produce standardized rules for both titles. This meant a cycle of Zonal, Interzonal, and Candidates Tournaments to produce a challenger who would then face the defending champion in a match for the title.

Naturally, since women only made up a small part of the total number of players, this system was only introduced gradually for the women's title. The first Candidates Tournament was held in 1952 and the first Interzonal in 1971. In the same cycle (1971–72), the format for the Candidates Tournament was changed from a round-robin to a knock-out series of matches. In 1976, the number of Interzonals was increased to two, due to the growing number of zones and chess-playing nations worldwide.

In 1986, the Candidates Tournament went back to the round-robin format and from 1991 there was again only played one Interzonal, but with a higher number of participants and using the Swiss system. The last championship cycle using this format (from 1995 to 1999) was surrounded by much controversy and followed by some major changes to the system.

== Knock-out Championships ==
Beginning in 2001, the women's championship, like the open one, was contested as single-elimination tournaments with 64 players playing mini-matches for six rounds until only one remained. In the case of the open title this format was widely criticized, since several of the tournaments played during this period (1998–2004) were won by players with relatively low ratings. This was taken by some as a devaluation of the title. In the case of the women's championship, however, all of the knock-out tournaments were actually won by players who have before or since proven that they do belong to the absolute world elite.

== Alternating formats ==
From 2010, the women's championship was held every year but in two alternating formats. In even years, the championship was decided in a 64-player knock-out tournament. In odd years, the reigning champion from the year before defended her title in a match against a challenger determined through a Grand Prix series of six tournaments. This format ended after 2018, when a format similar to the open World Chess Championship was introduced, with the current champion defending in a match against the challenger who has qualified for and won the Candidates tournament.

== Results ==
The tables below show the qualifiers and results for all Interzonal, Candidates and World Championship tournaments and matches. Players shown bracketed in italics (e.g. (Kushnir) in 1973–75) qualified for or were seeded in a specific stage of the championship cycle, but did not play. Players listed after players in italics (like Stefanova in 2011) only qualified due to the non-participation of the bracketed players.

The "Seeded into Final" column usually refers to the incumbent champion, but this has a different meaning for the 1949–50 tournament which was held to produce a new champion after the death of Menchik, and for the knock-out tournaments since 2001, where the defending champion gets no special privileges.

=== 1949–1999: Interzonals and Candidates Tournaments ===
Years	Interzonal Format	Interzonal Qualifiers	Seeded into Candidates	Candidates Format	Candidates Winner(s)	Seeded in Final	Championship Final
1949–50	None. After the death of Vera Menchik in 1944 FIDE decided to stage a tournament to determine the new champion.					16 players	Moscow 1949–50; Single round robin 1. Rudenko 11½ / 15; 2. Rubtsova 10½; 3.-4. Bykova, Belova 10
1952–53	None		16 players	Moscow 1952; Single round robin 1. Bykova 11½ / 15; 2.-3. Heemskerk, Ignatieva 10½	Bykova	Rudenko (1950 champion)	Moscow 1953; 14 game match Bykova won 8–6
1955–56	None		20 players	Moscow 1955; Single round robin 1. Rubtsova 15 / 19; 2. Volpert 14½; 3. Keller-Herrmann 14	Rubtsova	Bykova (1953 champion), Rudenko (1950 champion)	Moscow 1956; 3 players, Octuple round-robin 1. Rubtsova 10 / 16; 2. Bykova 9½; 3. Rudenko 4½
1958	Rematch					Rubtsova, Bykova	Moscow 1958; 14 game match Bykova won 8½–5½
1959	None		15 players	Plovdiv 1959; Single round robin 1. Zvorykina 11½ / 14; 2. Nedeljković 10½; 3. Volpert 9½	Zvorykina	Bykova (1958 champion)	Moscow 1959; 13 game match Bykova won 8½–4½
1961–62	None		17 players	Vrnjačka Banja 1961; Single round robin 1. Gaprindashvili 13 / 16; 2. Borisenko 11; 3. Zvorykina 10	Gaprindashvili	Bykova (1959 champion)	Moscow 1962; 11 game match Gaprindashvili won 9–2
1964–65	None		18 players	Sukhumi 1964; Single round robin 1.-3. Lazarević, Kushnir, Zatulovskaya 12½ / 17; 4.-5. Zvorykina, Jovanović 11	Kushnir (won playoff)	Gaprindashvili (1962 champion)	Riga 1965; 13 game match Gaprindashvili won 8½–4½
1967–69	None		18 players	Subotica 1967; Single round robin 1. Kushnir 13½ / 17; 2.-3. Kozlovskaya, Zatulovskaya 12½	Kushnir	Gaprindashvili (1965 champion)	Tbilisi and Moscow 1969; 14 game match Gaprindashvili won 9½–4½
1971–72	Ohrid 1971; 18 players Single round robin 3 qualified	1. Alexandria; 2.-3. Lazarević, Zatulovskaya	Kushnir	1971; 4 players, matches Semi-finals: Kushnir beat Zatulovskaya, Alexandria beat Lazarević	Kushnir (beat Alexandria in the final)	Gaprindashvili (1969 champion)	Riga 1972; 16 game match Gaprindashvili won 8½–7½
1973–75	Menorca 1973; 20 players Single round robin 4 qualified	1. Kozlovskaya; 2.-5. Shul, Levitina, Alexandria	(Kushnir)	1974–75; 4 players, matches Semi-finals: Alexandria beat Shul, Levitina beat Kozlovskaya	Alexandria (beat Levitina in the final)	Gaprindashvili (1972 champion)	Pitsunda and Tbilisi 1975; 12 game match Gaprindashvili won 8½–3½
1976–78	Two 11–14 player, single round robin Interzonals; 3 qualified from each	Roosendaal 1976; 1.-2. Akhmilovskaya, Kushnir; 3.-4. Lematschko	Alexandria, Levitina	1977–78; 8 players, matches Semi-finals: Chiburdanidze beat Akhmilovskaya, Kushnir beat Fatalibekova	Chiburdanidze (beat Kushnir in the final)	Gaprindashvili (1975 champion)	Tbilisi 1978; 15 game match Chiburdanidze won 8½–6½
1976–78	Two 11–14 player, single round robin Interzonals; 3 qualified from each	Tbilisi 1976; 1. Fatalibekova; 2.-3. Chiburdanidze, Kozlovskaya	Alexandria, Levitina	1977–78; 8 players, matches Semi-finals: Chiburdanidze beat Akhmilovskaya, Kushnir beat Fatalibekova	Chiburdanidze (beat Kushnir in the final)	Gaprindashvili (1975 champion)	Tbilisi 1978; 15 game match Chiburdanidze won 8½–6½
1979–81	Two 17–18 player, single round robin Interzonals; 3-4 qualified from each	Rio de Janeiro 1979; 1. Ioseliani; 2. Verőci-Petronić; 3. Alexandria	Gaprindashvili, (Kushnir)	1980–81; 8 players, matches Semi-finals: Alexandria beat Litinskaya, Ioseliani beat Gaprindashvili	Alexandria (beat Ioseliani in the final)	Chiburdanidze (1978 champion)	Borjomi and Tbilisi 1981; 16 game match Drawn 8–8; Chiburdanidze retained title
1979–81	Two 17–18 player, single round robin Interzonals; 3-4 qualified from each	Alicante 1979; 1.-2. Lematschko, Akhmilovskaya; 3. Gurieli; 4. Litinskaya	Gaprindashvili, (Kushnir)	1980–81; 8 players, matches Semi-finals: Alexandria beat Litinskaya, Ioseliani beat Gaprindashvili	Alexandria (beat Ioseliani in the final)	Chiburdanidze (1978 champion)	Borjomi and Tbilisi 1981; 16 game match Drawn 8–8; Chiburdanidze retained title
1982–84	Two 15–16 player, single round robin Interzonals; 3 qualified from each	Bad Kissingen 1982; 1. Gaprindashvili; 2. Semenova; 3. Lematschko	Alexandria, Ioseliani	1983–84; 8 players, matches Semi-finals: Levitina beat Alexandria, Semenova beat Ioseliani	Levitina (beat Semenova in the final)	Chiburdanidze (1981 champion)	Volgograd 1984; 14 game match Chiburdanidze won 8½–5½
1982–84	Two 15–16 player, single round robin Interzonals; 3 qualified from each	Tbilisi 1982; 1. Mureșan; 2. Levitina; 3. Liu Shilan	Alexandria, Ioseliani	1983–84; 8 players, matches Semi-finals: Levitina beat Alexandria, Semenova beat Ioseliani	Levitina (beat Semenova in the final)	Chiburdanidze (1981 champion)	Volgograd 1984; 14 game match Chiburdanidze won 8½–5½
1985–86	Two 14–16 player, single round robin Interzonals; 3 qualified from each	Havana 1985; 1. Alexandria; 2. Akhmilovskaya; 3.-5. Cramling	Malmö 1986; 8 players Double round-robin 1. Akhmilovskaya 9½ / 14; 2. Alexandria 8; 3. Litinskaya 8	Akhmilovskaya	Chiburdanidze (1984 champion)	Sofia 1986; 14 game match Chiburdanidze won 8½–5½	
1985–86	Two 14–16 player, single round robin Interzonals; 3 qualified from each	Zeleznovodsk 1985; 1. Litinskaya; 2. Wu Mingqian; 3.-4. Brustman	Malmö 1986; 8 players Double round-robin 1. Akhmilovskaya 9½ / 14; 2. Alexandria 8; 3. Litinskaya 8	Akhmilovskaya	Chiburdanidze (1984 champion)	Sofia 1986; 14 game match Chiburdanidze won 8½–5½	
1987–88	Two 16–18 player, single round robin Interzonals; 3 qualified from each	Smederevska Palanka 1987; 1. Litinskaya-Shul; 2.-3. Levitina, Gaprindashvili	Akhmilovskaya, Alexandria	Tsqaltubo 1988; 8 players Double round-robin 1.-2. Ioseliani, Akhmilovskaya 10 / 14; 3.-4. Levitina, Letinskaya-Shul 8	Ioseliani (won playoff against Akhmilovskaya)	Chiburdanidze (1986 champion)	Telavi 1988; 16 game match Chiburdanidze won 8½–7½
1987–88	Two 16–18 player, single round robin Interzonals; 3 qualified from each	Tuzla 1987; 1. Ioseliani; 2. Arakhamia; 3.-4. Brustman	Akhmilovskaya, Alexandria	Tsqaltubo 1988; 8 players Double round-robin 1.-2. Ioseliani, Akhmilovskaya 10 / 14; 3.-4. Levitina, Letinskaya-Shul 8	Ioseliani (won playoff against Akhmilovskaya)	Chiburdanidze (1986 champion)	Telavi 1988; 16 game match Chiburdanidze won 8½–7½
1990–91	Two 18 player, single round robin Interzonals; 3 qualified from each	Azov 1990; 1.-2. Kachiani, Galliamova; 3. Klimova-Richtrova	Ioseliani, Akhmilovskaya	Borzomi 1991; 8 players Single round-robin 1.-2. Xie Jun, Marić 4½ / 7; 3.-4. Galliamova, Ioseliani 4	Xie Jun (won playoff against Marić)	Chiburdanidze (1988 champion)	Manila 1991; 15 game match Xie Jun won 8½–6½
1990–91	Two 18 player, single round robin Interzonals; 3 qualified from each	Genting Highlands 1990; 1. Gaprindashvili; 2. Xie Jun; 3.-4. Marić	Ioseliani, Akhmilovskaya	Borzomi 1991; 8 players Single round-robin 1.-2. Xie Jun, Marić 4½ / 7; 3.-4. Galliamova, Ioseliani 4	Xie Jun (won playoff against Marić)	Chiburdanidze (1988 champion)	Manila 1991; 15 game match Xie Jun won 8½–6½
1991–93	Subotica 1991; 35 players Swiss; 6 qualified	1.-2. Gaprindashvili, Peng Zhaoqin; 3.-4. Ioseliani, Levitina; 5.-7. Wang Pin, Qin Kanying	Chiburdanidze, Marić S. Polgar	Shanghai 1992; 9 players Double round-robin 2 advanced to final 1. S. Polgar 12½ / 16; 2.-3. Ioseliani, Chiburdanidze 9½	Monaco 1993; Final ended 6 - 6 Ioseliani won lottery	Xie Jun (1991 champion)	Monaco 1993; 11 game match Xie Jun won 8½–2½
1993–96	Jakarta 1993; 39 players Swiss; 7 qualified	1. Arakhamia; 2. Galliamova; 3.-5. Chiburdanidze, Marić, Peng Zhaoqin; 6.-8. Cramling, Foisor	Ioseliani, S. Polgar	Tilburg 1994; 9 players Double round-robin 2 advanced to final 1.-2. S. Polgar, Chiburdanidze 10½ / 16; 3. Cramling 8½	Saint Petersburg 1995; S. Polgar won final 5½-1½	Xie Jun (1993 champion)	Jaén 1996; 13 game match S. Polgar won 8½–4½
1995–99	Chişinău 1995; 52 players Swiss; 7 qualified	1. Arakhamia; 2. Kachiani-Gersinska; 3.-6. Ioseliani, Galliamova, Peng Zhaoqin, Marić; 7.-9. Gurieli	Xie Jun, Chiburdanidze, Cramling	Groningen 1997; 10 players Double round-robin 2 advanced to final 1. Galliamova 13½ / 18; 2. Xie Jun 12½; 3.-4. Ioseliani, Chiburdanidze 11	Xie Jun, Galliamova	(S. Polgar) (1996 champion)	Kazan and Shenyang 1997; 15 game match Xie Jun won 8½ - 6½

=== 2000–2010: Knock-out tournaments ===
Years	Tournament Format	Quarter-finals	Semi-finals	Championship Final
2000	New Delhi; November – December 2000; 61 players 6 round, mini-match, knockout tournament	Xie Jun beat Zhukova; Kovalevskaya beat Peng Zhaoqin; Qin Kanying beat Peptan; Marić beat Skripchenko	Xie Jun beat Kovalevskaya; Qin Kanying beat Marić	Xie Jun beat Qin Kanying; 2½–1½
2001	Moscow; November – December 2001; 64 players 6 round, mini-match, knockout tournament	Kosteniuk beat Skripchenko, Foisor beat Xu Yuhua, Chiburdanidze beat Peng Zhaoqin, Zhu Chen beat Khurtsidze	Kosteniuk beat Xu Yuhua, Zhu Chen beat Chiburdanidze	Zhu Chen beat Kosteniuk; 5–3
2004	Elista; May – June 2004; 64 players 6 round, mini-match, knockout tournament	Koneru Humpy beat Xu Yuhua, Kachiani-Gersinska beat Kovalevskaya, Stefanova beat Dzagnidze, Chiburdanidze beat Čmilytė	Kovalevskaya beat Koneru Humpy, Stefanova beat Chiburdanidze	Stefanova beat Kovalevskaya; 2½–½
2006	Ekaterinburg; March 2006; 64 players 6 round, mini-match, knockout tournament	Čmilytė beat Chiburdanidze, Galliamova beat Khurtsidze, Matveeva beat Sebag, Xu Yuhua beat Kovalevskaya	Xu Yuhua beat Matveeva, Galliamova beat Čmilytė	Xu Yuhua beat Galliamova; 2½–½
2008	Nalchik; August – September 2008; 64 players 6 round, mini-match, knockout tournament	Kosteniuk beat Ushenina, Cramling beat Stefanova, Hou Yifan beat Mkrtchian, Koneru Humpy beat Shen Yang	Kosteniuk beat Cramling, Hou Yifan beat Koneru Humpy	Kosteniuk beat Hou Yifan; 2½–1½
2010	Hatay; December 2010; 64 players 6 round, mini-match, knockout tournament	Ruan Lufei beat Dronavalli Harika, Zhao Xue beat Skripchenko, Hou Yifan beat Lahno, Koneru Humpy beat Ju Wenjun	Ruan Lufei beat Zhao Xue; Hou Yifan beat Koneru Humpy	Hou Yifan beat Ruan Lufei; 5–3

=== 2011–2018: alternating formats ===
Years	Qualification Format	Qualifiers	Seeded into Final	Championship Final
2011	FIDE Women's Grand Prix 2009–2011; 6 tournament series, winner qualified 1. Hou Yifan 410; 2. Humpy Koneru 398 1/3	Humpy Koneru	Hou Yifan (2010 champion)	Tirana; November 2011; 10 game match Hou Yifan won 5½–2½
2012	Khanty Mansiysk November – December 2012; 64 players 6 round, mini-match, knockout tournament	Quarter-finals: Antoaneta Stefanova beat Marie Sebag, Zhao Xue beat Harika Dronavalli, Anna Ushenina beat Nadezhda Kosintseva, Huang Qian beat Ju Wenjun	Semi-finals: Stefanova beat Dronavalli; Ushenina beat Wenjun	Ushenina beat Stefanova; 3½–2½
2013	FIDE Women's Grand Prix 2011–2012; 6 tournament series, winner qualified 1. Hou Yifan 480; 2. Humpy Koneru 415	Hou Yifan	Anna Ushenina (2012 champion)	Taizhou, Jiangsu; September 2013; 10 game match Hou Yifan won 5½–1½
2015	Sochi March – April 2015; 64 players 6 round, mini-match, knockout tournament	Quarter-finals: Mariya Muzychuk beat Humpy Koneru, Harika Dronavalli beat Meri Arabidze, Natalia Pogonina beat Zhao Xue, Pia Cramling beat Anna Muzychuk	Semi-finals: M. Muzychuk beat Dronavalli; Pogonina beat Cramling	M. Muzychuk beat Pogonina; 2½–1½
2016	FIDE Women's Grand Prix 2013–14; 6 tournament series, winner qualified 1. Hou Yifan 465; 2. Humpy Koneru 380	Hou Yifan	Mariya Muzychuk (2015 champion)	Lviv; March 2016; 10 game match Hou Yifan won 6–3.
2017	Tehran February – March 2017; 64 players 6 round, mini-match, knockout tournament	Quarter-finals: Tan Zhongyi beat Ju Wenjun, Harika Dronavalli beat Nana Dzagnidze, Anna Muzychuk beat Antoaneta Stefanova, Alexandra Kosteniuk beat Ni Shiqun	Semi-finals: Tan beat Dronavalli; A. Muzychuk beat Kosteniuk	Tan Zhongyi beat A. Muzychuk; 3½–2½
2018 (May)	FIDE Women's Grand Prix 2015–16; 5 tournament series, winner qualified 1. Ju Wenjun 413 1/3; 2. Humpy Koneru 335	Ju Wenjun	Tan Zhongyi (2017 champion)	Shanghai and Chongqing; May 2018; 10 game match Ju Wenjun won 5½-4½
2018 (November)	Khanty-Mansiysk November 2018 64 players 6 round, mini-match, knockout tournament	Quarter-finals: Ju Wenjun beat Gulrukhbegim Tokhirjonova Alexandra Kosteniuk beat Anna Muzychuk Mariya Muzychuk beat Zhansaya Abdumalik Kateryna Lagno beat Lei Tingjie	Semi-finals: Ju beat Kosteniuk Lagno beat M. Muzychuk	Ju Wenjun beat Kateryna Lagno 5-3

=== 2020-present: return to match-only format ===
Years	Qualification format	Qualifiers	Seeded into Candidates	Candidates Format	Candidates Winner(s)	Seeded in Final	Championship Final
2020	none		Kateryna Lagno Alexandra Kosteniuk Mariya Muzychuk (Hou Yifan) Anna Muzychuk Tan Zhongyi Nana Dzagnidze Valentina Gunina Aleksandra Goryachkina	Women's Candidates Tournament 2019 8 player double round-robin tournament Kazan, May-June 2019	Aleksandra Goryachkina	Ju Wenjun (2018 Champion)	Shanghai and Vladivostok January 2020 12-game match drawn 6-6 Ju Wenjun won rapid play-off 2½-1½
2023	FIDE Women's Grand Prix 2019-2021 September 2019-June 2021 Top two qualify	Koneru Humpy Kateryna Lagno	Aleksandra Goryachkina Mariya Muzychuk	Women's Candidates Tournament 2022-23 8 player knockout tournament Monaco, Khiva, and Chongqing, October-December 2022, March-April 2023	Lei Tingjie	Ju Wenjun (2020 Champion)	Shanghai and Chongqing July 2023 12-game match Ju Wenjun won 6½-5½
2023	Women's Chess World Cup 2021 Sochi July-August 2021 103 players, 7 round, mini-match, knockout tournament Top three qualify	Alexandra Kosteniuk Tan Zhongyi Anna Muzychuk	Aleksandra Goryachkina Mariya Muzychuk	Women's Candidates Tournament 2022-23 8 player knockout tournament Monaco, Khiva, and Chongqing, October-December 2022, March-April 2023	Lei Tingjie	Ju Wenjun (2020 Champion)	Shanghai and Chongqing July 2023 12-game match Ju Wenjun won 6½-5½
2023	FIDE Women's Grand Swiss Tournament 2021 Riga October-November 2021 50-player Swiss tournament Top player qualifies	Lei Tingjie	Aleksandra Goryachkina Mariya Muzychuk	Women's Candidates Tournament 2022-23 8 player knockout tournament Monaco, Khiva, and Chongqing, October-December 2022, March-April 2023	Lei Tingjie	Ju Wenjun (2020 Champion)	Shanghai and Chongqing July 2023 12-game match Ju Wenjun won 6½-5½
2025	FIDE Women's Grand Prix 2022–23 September 2022-May 2023 Top two qualify	Kateryna Lagno Aleksandra Goryachkina	Lei Tingjie Koneru Humpy	Women's Candidates Tournament 2024 8 player double round-robin tournament Toronto, April 2024	Tan Zhongyi	Ju Wenjun (2023 Champion)	TBD 12-game match
2025	Women's Chess World Cup 2023 Baku July-August 2023 103 players, 7 round, mini-match, knockout tournament Top three qualify	(Aleksandra Goryachkina) Nurgyul Salimova Anna Muzychuk	Lei Tingjie Koneru Humpy	Women's Candidates Tournament 2024 8 player double round-robin tournament Toronto, April 2024	Tan Zhongyi	Ju Wenjun (2023 Champion)	TBD 12-game match
2025	FIDE Women's Grand Swiss Tournament 2023 Isle of Man October-November 2023 Top two qualify	R Vaishali Tan Zhongyi	Lei Tingjie Koneru Humpy	Women's Candidates Tournament 2024 8 player double round-robin tournament Toronto, April 2024	Tan Zhongyi	Ju Wenjun (2023 Champion)	TBD 12-game match
