= FIDE Women's Grand Prix =

Biennial series of chess tournaments for women

The FIDE Women's Grand Prix is a biennial series of chess tournaments, organized by FIDE.

== Results ==
Hou Yifan has won all three Grand Prix she has played. Koneru Humpy has been the perennial runner-up, coming second in each of the first five Grand Prix series.

The players who qualified for the Women's World Chess Championship are marked with a purple background.

The players who qualified for the Women's Candidates Tournament are marked with a green background.

Years	Stages	Total prize money	Winner	Runner-up	Third place
2009–11	6	€300,000	(China) Hou Yifan	(India) Koneru Humpy	(Georgia (country)) Nana Dzagnidze
2011–12	6	€300,000	(China) Hou Yifan	(India) Koneru Humpy	(Slovenia) Anna Muzychuk
2013–14	6	€450,000	(China) Hou Yifan	(India) Koneru Humpy	(China) Ju Wenjun
2015–16	5	€390,000	(China) Ju Wenjun	(India) Koneru Humpy	(Russia) Valentina Gunina
2019–21	4	€400,000	(Russia) Aleksandra Goryachkina	(India) Koneru Humpy	(Russia) Kateryna Lagno
2022–23	4	€400,000	(FIDE) Kateryna Lagno	(FIDE) Aleksandra Goryachkina	(China) Zhu Jiner
2024–25	6	€600,000	(China) Zhu Jiner	(FIDE) Aleksandra Goryachkina	(Ukraine) Anna Muzychuk

== Medallists ==
The following is a list of the Women's Grand Prix medallists and their respective medal counts.

Symbol key
°	FIDE Women's Grand Prix 2024–25 participant
^	FIDE Women's Grand Prix 2024–25 replacement player

Medallist	Gold	Silver	Bronze	Medals	Events	Series	Medal SR
Humpy Koneru (IND)°	8	4	2	14	23	7	0.61
Hou Yifan (CHN)	7	2	1	10	13	4	0.77
Ju Wenjun (CHN)	3	3	2	8	14	5	0.57
Aleksandra Goryachkina (FIDE)°	3	2	2	7	9	3	0.78
Anna Muzychuk (UKR)°	2	5	1	8	18	6	0.44
Nana Dzagnidze (GEO)°	2	1	3	6	20	6	0.30
Alexandra Kosteniuk (SUI)°	2	1	1	4	19	6	0.21
Kateryna Lagno (FIDE)°	1	1	2	4	12	4	0.33
Tatiana Kosintseva (FIDE)	1	1	1	3	11	3	0.27
Bella Khotenashvili (GEO)	1	1	0	2	8	3	0.25
Zhao Xue (CHN)	1	0	3	4	16	5	0.25
Harika Dronavalli (IND)°	1	0	2	3	16	5	0.19
Zhansaya Abdumalik (KAZ)	1	0	1	2	4	2	0.50
Valentina Gunina (FIDE)	1	0	1	2	6	2	0.33
Dinara Wagner (GER)	1	0	0	1	3	1	0.33
Xu Yuhua (CHN)	1	0	0	1	4	1	0.25
Alina Kashlinskaya (POL)^	1	0	0	1	7	3	0.14
Zhu Jiner (CHN)°	0	3	2	5	6	2	0.83
Elina Danielian (ARM)	0	2	2	4	13	4	0.31
Bibisara Assaubayeva (KAZ)°	0	2	1	3	6	2	0.50
Mariya Muzychuk (UKR)°	0	2	0	2	10	4	0.20
Tan Zhongyi (CHN)°	0	1	2	3	7	3	0.43
Nino Batsiashvili (GEO)	0	1	1	2	4	2	0.50
Polina Shuvalova (FIDE)^	0	1	0	1	4	2	0.25
Nadezhda Kosintseva (FIDE)	0	1	0	1	4	1	0.25
Sarasadat Khademalsharieh (ESP)°	0	1	0	1	5	2	0.20
Olga Girya (FIDE)	0	1	0	1	7	2	0.14
Antoaneta Stefanova (BUL)	0	1	0	1	18	5	0.06
Gunay Mammadzada (AZE)	0	0	1	1	2	1	0.50
Divya Deshmukh (IND)	0	0	1	1	3	1	0.33
Stavroula Tsolakidou (GRE)°	0	0	1	1	3	1	0.33
Ekaterina Kovalevskaya (FIDE)	0	0	1	1	4	1	0.25
Viktorija Čmilytė (LTU)	0	0	1	1	6	2	0.17
Marie Sebag (FRA)	0	0	1	1	6	2	0.17
Batkhuyag Munguntuul (MGL)°	0	0	1	1	11	3	0.09
Total	37	37	37	111	37	7	3.00

Key: Medal SR = medals won / events

== See also ==
- FIDE Grand Prix
