= Gunay Mammadzada =

Azerbaijani chess player (born 2000)

- Mammadzada at the 2026 Chess Olympiad

Personal information
- Born: June 19, 2000 (age 26) Baku, Azerbaijan

Chess career
- Country: Azerbaijan
- Title: International Master (2018); Woman Grandmaster (2014)
- Peak rating: 2483 (October 2022)
- Peak ranking: No. 18 woman (October 2022)

Gunay Vugar qizi Mammadzada (Azerbaijani: Günay Vüqar qızı Məmmədzadə; born June 19, 2000) is an Azerbaijani chess player who holds the titles of International Master (IM) and Woman Grandmaster (WGM) through the International Chess Federation (FIDE). She has been an under-10 girls' World Youth Champion, and both an under-8 and an under-14 girls' European Youth Champion. Mammadzada is a two-time Azerbaijani women's national champion, which she achieved in 2017 and 2019. She has represented Azerbaijan at the Chess Olympiad, the World Team Chess Championship, and the European Team Chess Championship, winning both team and individual bronze medals at the latter in 2019. Mammadzada has a peak FIDE rating of 2483 and has been ranked as high as No. 18 in the world among women.

Mammadzada began playing chess at five years old. After winning several medals at both the European Youth and World Youth Championships, she became the youngest Woman Grandmaster (WGM) in Azerbaijan history at 14 years old in 2014. She earned all of her norms for the International Master (IM) title by 2016 and was awarded the title in 2018 when she reached the required rating threshold of 2400. Among the highest-rated players she has defeated are Abhijeet Gupta with a rating of 2614 and Koneru Humpy, one of the leading female players, with a rating of 2577.

== Early life and background ==
Gunay Mammadzada was born on 19 June 2000 in Baku, the capital of Azerbaijan. She began playing chess at five years old, becoming interested in the game from watching her grandparents play recreationally. She joined the Olympic Reserve Youth Chess School No. 1 that same year. At the school, she began working with Rasul Ibrahimov, an Azerbaijani Grandmaster (GM) who has long since remained her coach.

Mammadzada began to have national and international success at around the age of seven. Early in 2007, she finished in third place at the Azerbaijani national championships in the under-8 girls' division. Later that year, she made her debuts at the European Youth and World Youth Chess Championships in the same division. She medalled in both events, earning bronze at the European Championships and silver at the World Championships. She scored 8½/11 in the latter event, (Note: 8½ points in 11 games. (A win is 1 point, a draw is a ½ point, and a loss is 0 points.)) losing games to the winner Ivana Maria Furtado and Zhansaya Abdumalik. The following year, she medalled at both events again, winning gold at the European Championships and earning bronze at the World Championships. She finished behind Abdumalik and Qiyu Zhou at the latter event, having lost against both of them. Her victory over Kelly Wang was instrumental in her winning the tiebreak over Wang for third place.

== Chess career ==
=== 2009–14: Under-10 World Champion, WGM at 14 ===
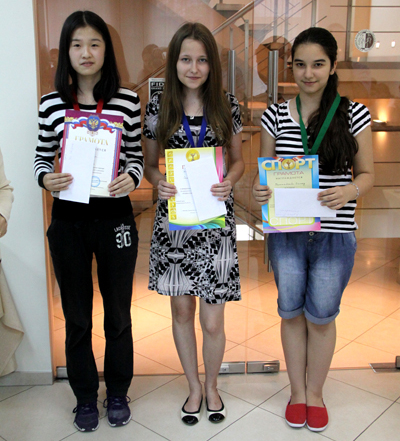
Mammadzada (right) in 2013

Mammadzada earned her first FIDE rating in January 2009, starting out at 1764 at age eight after participating in the under-10 girls' division at the 2008 European Youth Championship. After not medalling at the 2009 European Youth Championship, she recovered to win the under-10 girls' division at the 2009 World Youth Championship in Antalya. She won her first ten games at the latter event en route to a score of 10½/11, two points ahead of Furtado, who finished in second place and was one of the players she defeated. Mammadzada first entered the Azerbaijani women's national championship in 2010 at nine years old, finishing in last place as the lowest-rated competitor. She also was awarded the Woman FIDE Master (WFM) title in 2010. Mammadzada had another triumph in 2012, finishing in clear first at the under-13 girls' World School Individual Chess Championship, ahead of two higher-rated Russian players: Anna Vasenina and Irina Drogovoz. She came close to medalling at European Youth Championship later that year, finishing in joint third in the under-12 girls' division with 7/9 along with two other players, but had a lesser tiebreak.

During 2013, Mammadzada reached rating milestones of 2000 and 2100. She won her second European Youth Championship in Montenegro, finishing in clear first in the under-14 girls' division with 7½/9. In particular, she defeated Nela Pychova in the last round when Pychova had begun the round alone in first place. In 2014, Mammadzada earned both the Woman International Master (WIM) and Woman Grandmaster (WGM) titles. Having already earned her first WIM norm in July 2013 at the Nana Aleksandria Cup in Georgia, she earned both WIM and WGM norms at two tournaments in 2014, the David Bronstein Memorial in Belarus that February and the European Individual Women's Chess Championship in Bulgaria that July. She scored 5/9 at the former event, highlighted by a last-round win against Siniša Dražić, a Serbian GM. She scored 6/11 at the latter event and gained 134 rating points to cross the 2300 rating threshold needed for the WGM title. Mammadzada had been in eighth place at the European Individual Championship after starting out with a score of 5/7 before finishing in 38th place. She clinched the WGM title in September at the Baku Open by scoring 4/9 against much stronger opponents with an average rating of 2494, earning both her third and final WGM norm and her first International Master (IM) norm. At 14 years old, Mammadzada became Azerbaijan's youngest WGM in history, surpassing Turkan Mamedyarova's previous record of attaining the title at age 18.

=== 2015–present: International Master title ===
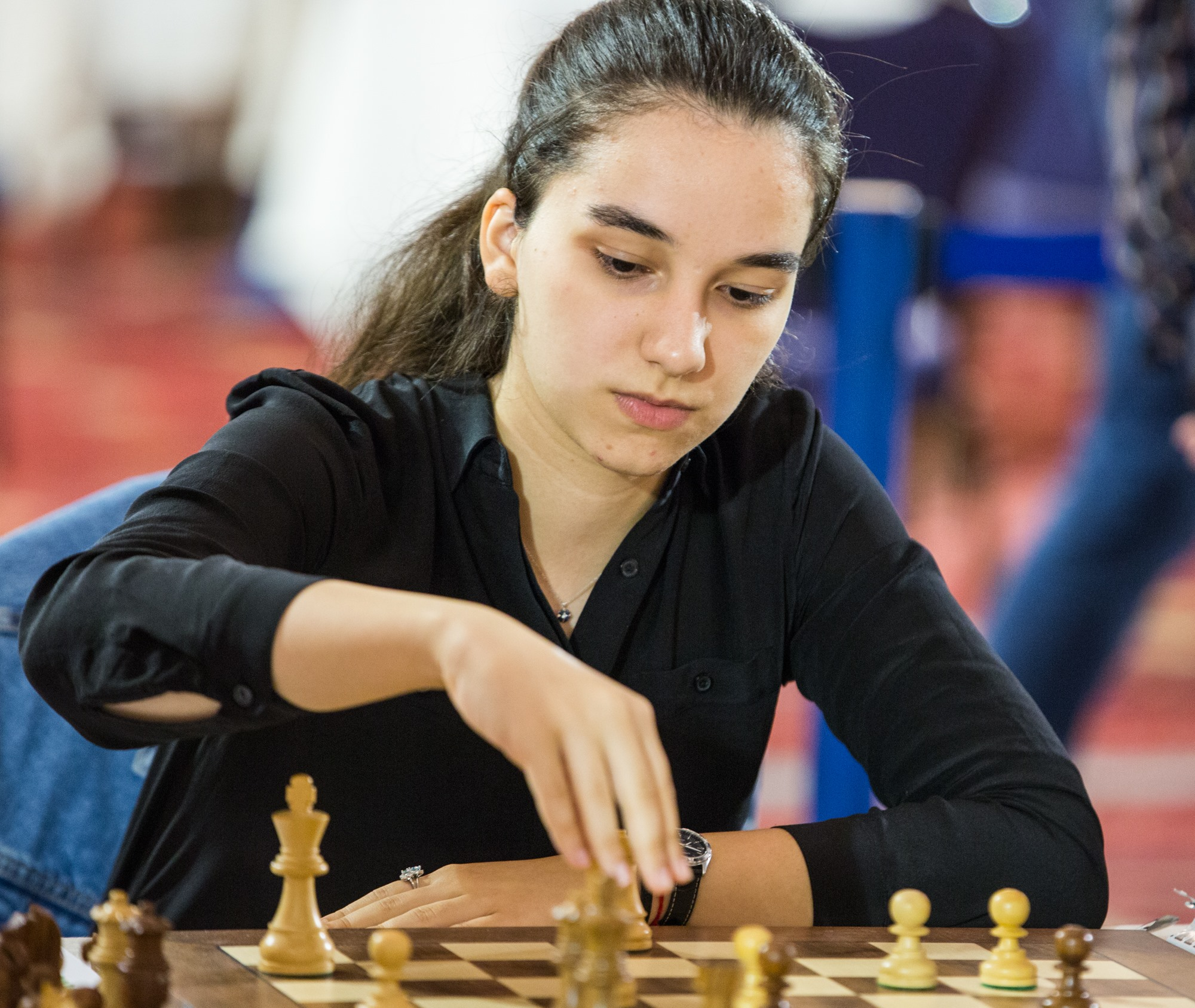
Mammadzada in 2017

Mammadzada earned her last two IM norms in 2015 and 2016, but did not reach the rating threshold of 2400 needed for the title until 2018. Her second IM norm came at the Czech Open in July 2015, where she scored 5½/9. Her third and final IM norm came at the Nakhchivan Open in Azerbaijan, where she scored 5/9 and won her last-round game against Zaur Mammadov, an Azerbaijani GM. Mammadzada's last two major youth championships were the under-20 girls' World Junior Chess Championships in 2015 and 2017. She finished in seventh place in 2015, but underperformed in 2017 and lost 64 rating points. Nonetheless, she had better results earlier in 2017. She won her first Azerbaijani Women's Championship in February, scoring 7/9 to finish a full point ahead of second place. During the tournament, she defeated Gulnar Mammadova, an IM who was the only player with a higher rating. She also performed well at the European Individual Women's Championship, scoring 7/11 and finishing with four wins in a row. Mammadzada quickly regained most of the rating points she lost at the World Junior Championship in early 2018 between her performance at the Moscow Open and finishing runner-up to Khanim Balajayeva at the women's national championship on the tiebreak criteria. She then crossed a rating of 2400 to earn the IM title at the European Individual Women's Championship in Slovakia, scoring 7½/11 to finish in tenth place overall and gain 50 rating points to increase her rating to 2442. Later in 2018 at the Abu Dhabi Masters, she also won a game against Abhijeet Gupta, an Indian GM who with a rating of 2614 is the highest-rated player she has defeated.

Mammadzada won her second Azerbaijan Women's Championship in 2019 with a dominant score of 8½/9, corresponding to a performance rating of 2622. She also fared well at the European Women Club Cup later in the year, scoring 4/6 while representing Odlar Yurdu for a performance rating of 2597. During the tournament, she defeated two Grandmasters: Valentina Gunina, who was rated 2509, and Koneru Humpy, who was rated 2577. After over a year-long hiatus due to the COVID-19 pandemic, Mammadzada was named a replacement player for the last leg of the FIDE Women's Grand Prix 2019–2021 in Gibraltar in May 2021. Despite being the third-lowest rated player out of the twelve in the field, she had an excellent result in the round-robin tournament, finishing in third place with a score of 6½/11 behind fellow replacement player Abdumalik and Mariya Muzychuk. She had an opportunity to earn a GM norm had she won or drawn against Anna Muzychuk in the ninth round, but lost that game.

On July 4, 2022, Mammadzada won the women's tournament at the 7th International Chess Festival dedicated to the memory of the country's late president Lech Kaczyński in Poland. In August 2022, she won a silver medal at the European Individual Women's Championship with a score of 8/11, a ½ point behind Monika Soćko.

== National representation ==
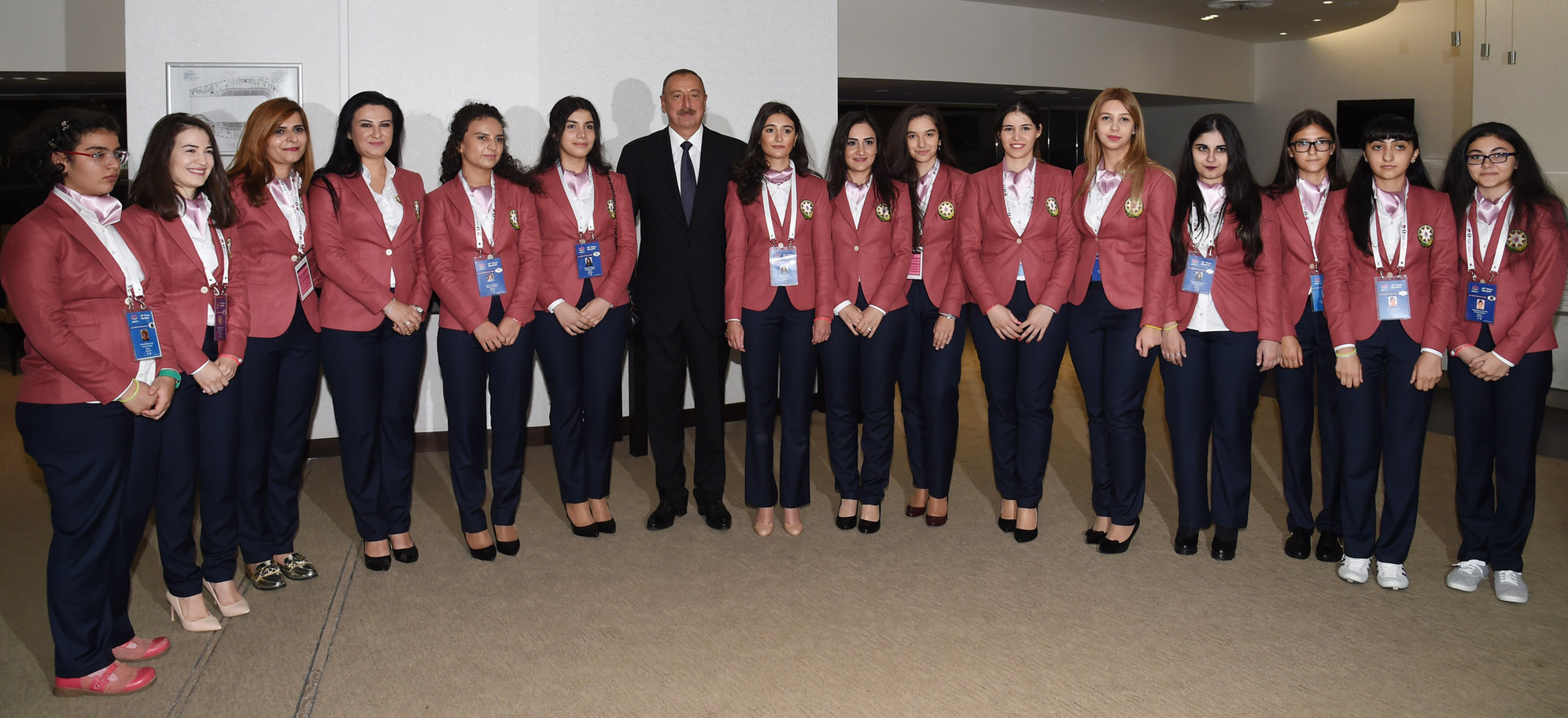
Mammadzada (seventh from the right) with the Azerbaijan women's teams at the 2016 Baku Olympiad

Mammadzada began representing Azerbaijan at the under-16 Chess Olympiad in 2016 in Slovakia. She played on the second board behind Nail Bashirli and had a good individual performance, scoring 5½/8 to finish in fifth place on the second board behind only male players. She has since played on two Azerbaijan Women's Chess Olympiad teams. Azerbaijan fared similarly in both of them, finishing in joint fourth place with 16 points in both 2016 when they scored +7–2=2 (Note: 7 wins, 2 losses, and 2 draws) and 2018 when they scored +6–1=4. With the tiebreak criteria, they came in eighth place in 2016 and tenth place in 2018. At the 2016 Baku Olympiad, Azerbaijan was permitted to enter three teams as the host country. Mammadzada played on the first team's second board behind Zeinab Mamedjarova in 2016 and had a good performance, scoring 5½/10 and gaining rating points. At the 2018 Batumi Olympiad, Mammadzada played on the top board, but only managed an even score and lost rating points.

Mammadzada has also represented Azerbaijan at the European Women Team Chess Championships. She played on the top board in both 2017 and 2019. After finishing in eighth place with 11 points (+4–2=3) in 2017 in Greece, Azerbaijan won the team bronze medal in 2019 behind gold medallists Russia and silver medallists Georgia, the host country. With Khanim Balajayeva, Ulviyya Fataliyeva, and Gulnar Mammadova on the lower boards and Turkan Mamedjarova on the reserve board, they scored 14 points (+6–1=2), only losing to Spain while drawing both Russia and Georgia. Individually, Mammadzada also won a bronze medal on the top board with a score of 5½/8 corresponding to a performance rating of 2565, which was behind only Grandmasters Nana Dzagnidze and Pia Cramling.

== Playing style ==
Mammadzada primarily plays 1.e4 (the King's Pawn Game) compared to 1.d4 (the Queen's Pawn Game) or other first moves. Her favourite chess pieces are the knight and the queen, which she considers her "main weapons". Nonetheless, she generally intends to adapt her playing style as needed in any given game. Fikret Sideifzade, an International Master who has coached the Azerbaijan women's team, described Mammadzada's strengths as "[having] a nice opening knowledge and strong nerves."

== Personal life ==
Mammadzada has a brother who is four years younger. She attended university at the Azerbaijan State Physical Culture and Sports Academy, and previously attended secondary school at Intelligence School Lyceum No. 6 in Baku.

Mammadzada's chess idol is Magnus Carlsen. She had idolized Judit Polgár more at a younger age. Outside of chess, Mammadzada's hobbies include horseback riding, running, reading, and studying languages. In addition to Azerbaijani, she can speak English, French and Russian. Growing up, she also liked swimming and shooting.
