= Women's Candidates Tournament 2019 =

Women's World Chess Championship qualifying event

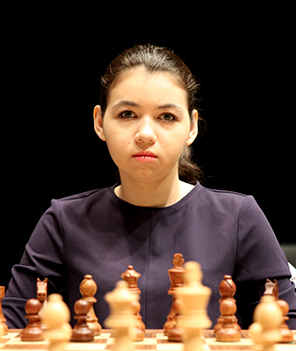
- Aleksandra Goryachkina, the winner of the tournament, advanced to the Women's World Chess Championship 2020 match.
- Location: Kazan, Russia
- Dates: 29 May to 19 June 2019
- Competitors: 8 from 4 nations

Champion
- (Russia) Aleksandra Goryachkina

The Women's Candidates Tournament 2019 was held from 29 May to 19 June 2019 in Kazan, Russia. The format was an eight-player double round-robin tournament. The winner took part in the Women's World Chess Championship 2020 match.

== Summary ==
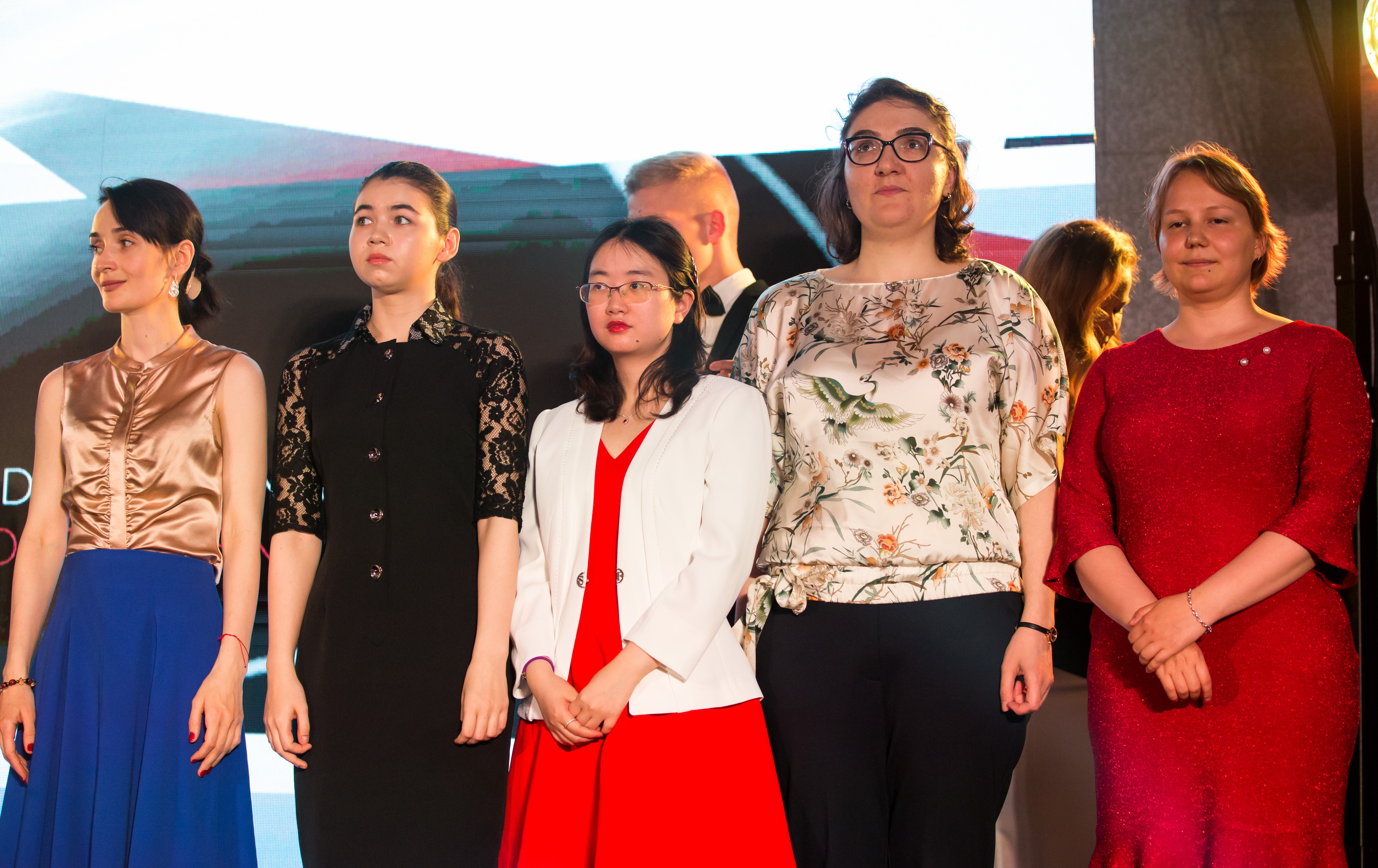
Opening ceremony of the tournament

Three players qualified by virtue of reaching the semi-finals of the last championship. All remaining players came from the rating list, by taking the average of all twelve monthly ratings in 2018. Aleksandra Goryachkina replaced Hou Yifan, who declined an invitation.

=== Qualifiers ===
Place	Player	Points	Women's world no.	Elo (May 2019)	Women's World champion
1	(Russia) Aleksandra Goryachkina	9.5	9	2522	
2	(Ukraine) Anna Muzychuk	8	7	2539	
3	(Russia) Kateryna Lagno	7	4	2554	
4	(China) Tan Zhongyi	7	10	2513	2017
5	(Georgia (country)) Nana Dzagnidze	6.5	11	2510	
6	(Ukraine) Mariya Muzychuk	6.5	3	2563	2015
7	(Russia) Alexandra Kosteniuk	6	6	2546	2008
8	(Russia) Valentina Gunina	5.5	13	2506	

Goryachkina won with two rounds to spare.

== Results ==
=== By round ===
Leading player after each round in green.

Place	Player	Results by round													
Place	Player	1	2	3	4	5	6	7	8	9	10	11	12	13	14
1	Aleksandra Goryachkina (RUS)	½	1½	2½	3	4	5	5½	6½	7½	8	8½	9	9½	9½
2	Anna Muzychuk (UKR)	½	½	½	1	1½	2½	3	3½	4½	5	5½	6½	7½	8
3	Kateryna Lagno (RUS)	½	1	1	2	2½	3½	4	4½	5	5½	6	6	6½	7
4	Tan Zhongyi (CHN)	½	1	2	2½	2½	2½	2½	3½	3½	4	5	5½	6	7
5	Nana Dzagnidze (GEO)	½	1½	2½	3½	3½	3½	4	4	4	4½	4½	5½	6	6½
6	Mariya Muzychuk (UKR)	½	1	1	1	1½	2½	3	3½	4½	5	5½	5½	5½	6½
7	Alexandra Kosteniuk (RUS)	½	1	1	1½	2½	2½	3	3	3½	4½	4½	4½	5½	6
8	Valentina Gunina (RUS)	½	½	1½	1½	2	2	3	3½	3½	3½	4½	5½	5½	5½

=== Crosstable ===
No.	Player	Elo (May 2019)	1		2		3		4		5		6		7		8		Pts	Tie-breaks	Place
No.	Player	Elo (May 2019)	1		2		3		4		5		6		7		8		Pts	H2H	Place
1	Valentina Gunina (RUS)	2506			1	0	0	0	½	½	0	1	½	1	0	0	1	0	5½		8
2	Alexandra Kosteniuk (RUS)	2546	0	1			½	0	½	½	1	0	0	1	½	½	½	0	6		7
3	Aleksandra Goryachkina (RUS)	2522	1	1	½	1			1	½	1	½	½	0	½	½	1	½	9½		1
4	Kateryna Lagno (RUS)	2554	½	½	½	½	0	½			½	½	1	½	½	0	1	½	7	1½	3
5	Nana Dzagnidze (GEO)	2510	1	0	0	1	0	½	½	½			1	½	1	0	½	0	6½	1½	5
6	Mariya Muzychuk (UKR)	2563	½	0	1	0	½	1	0	½	0	½			½	½	½	1	6½	½	6
7	Anna Muzychuk (UKR)	2539	1	1	½	½	½	½	½	1	0	1	½	½			0	½	8		2
8	Tan Zhongyi (CHN)	2513	0	1	½	1	0	½	0	½	½	1	½	0	1	½			7	½	4
