= Baira Kovanova =

Russian chess player (born 1987)

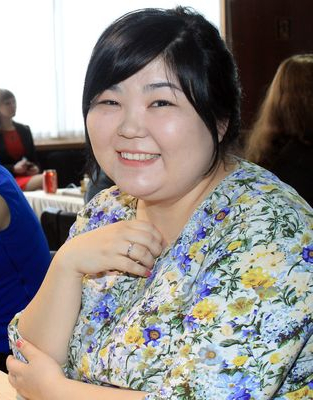

Personal information
- Born: 12 May 1987 (age 39) Elista, Kalmykia, Russia

Chess career
- Country: Russia
- Title: Woman Grandmaster (2007)
- Peak rating: 2408 (September 2009)

Baira Kovanova (born 12 May 1987) is a Russian chess player, and a woman grandmaster.

She made it to the second round of the Women's World Chess Championship 2010.

She also came 17th in the FIDE Women's Grand Prix 2009–11.
