= FIDE Women's Grand Prix 2019–2021 =

Women's chess tournament series

FIDE Women's Grand Prix Series 2019-21
Tournament information
- Sport: Chess
- Location: Russia; Monaco; Switzerland; Gibraltar
- Dates: 10 September 2019–2 June 2021
- Administrator: FIDE
- Format: Series of round-robin tournaments

Final positions
- Champion: (Russia) Aleksandra Goryachkina
- 1st runner-up: (India) Koneru Humpy
- 2nd runner-up: (Russia) Kateryna Lagno

The 2019–2021 edition of the FIDE Women's Grand Prix was a series of four chess tournaments exclusively for women which determined two players to play in the Women's Candidates Tournament 2022. The winner of the Candidates Tournament played a 12-game match against the world champion in the Women's World Chess Championship 2023.

The 2019–2021 edition was the fifth cycle of the tournament series. The number one woman player, Hou Yifan, who won the first three editions of the Grand Prix, did not play due to her studies at Oxford University.

== Players ==
A list of 16 participants was published by FIDE in July 2019.

Invitee	Country	Elo (July 2019)
Ju Wenjun	China	2595
Aleksandra Goryachkina	Russia	2564
Humpy Koneru	India	2558
Mariya Muzychuk	Ukraine	2551
Kateryna Lagno	Russia	2549
Anna Muzychuk	Ukraine	2547
Alexandra Kosteniuk	Russia	2517
Nana Dzagnidze	Georgia	2511
Valentina Gunina	Russia	2497
Dronavalli Harika	India	2492
Alina Kashlinskaya	Russia	2492
Zhao Xue	China	2485
Pia Cramling	Sweden	2479
Antoaneta Stefanova	Bulgaria	2474
Elisabeth Paehtz	Germany	2473
Marie Sebag	France	2451
Zhansaya Abdumalik^{R}	Kazakhstan	2458
Dinara Saduakassova^{R}	Kazakhstan	2474
Irina Bulmaga^{R}	Romania	2435
Gunay Mammadzada^{R}	Azerbaijan	2427

^{R} Due to travel restrictions on Chinese citizens due to the Coronavirus outbreak, Zhao Xue was unable to participate in the Lausanne leg of the Grand Prix. She was replaced by Zhansaya Abdumalik. For the Gibraltar WGP, Koneru, Ju, Zhao and Sebag were replaced by Zhansaya Abdumalik, Dinara Saduakassova, Irina Bulmaga and Gunay Mammadzada. These replacement players were not eligible for the Candidates spots.

== Schedule and results ==
No.	Host city	Date	Winner
1	Skolkovo, Russia	10–23 September 2019	(India) Koneru Humpy
2	Monte Carlo, Monaco	2–15 December 2019	(Russia) Alexandra Kosteniuk
3	Lausanne, Switzerland	1–14 March 2020	(Georgia (country)) Nana Dzagnidze
4	Caleta Hotel, Gibraltar	22 May – 2 June 2021	(Kazakhstan) Zhansaya Abdumalik

The fourth stage of the Grand Prix, initially planned from 2–15 May 2020 in Sardinia, was postponed by FIDE due to the ongoing Coronavirus pandemic. FIDE announced that the fourth stop of the Grand Prix was to be held in Gibraltar from 17–29 January, 2021, but it was then postponed again to 22 May – 2 June 2021.

== Events crosstables ==
FIDE Women's Grand Prix Stage 1, 10–23 September, 2019, Skolkovo, Russia, Category XI (2511.58)
	Player	Rating	1	2	3	4	5	6	7	8	9	10	11	12	Points	TB1 (Note: Direct encounter (the results of the players in the same point group).)	TB2 (Note: Number of victories.)	TB3 (Note: Sonneborn–Berger score.)	Grand Prix Points	Prize money
1	GM Koneru Humpy (IND)	2560		½	½	½	1	1	½	½	1	1	½	1	8	0	5	40.50	160	€15,000
2	GM Ju Wenjun (CHN)	2576	½		½	0	½	1	½	1	1	½	1	1	7½	½	5	36.75	120	€11,000
3	GM Aleksandra Goryachkina (RUS)	2564	½	½		½	½	½	1	1	½	1	½	1	7½	½	4	37.25	120	€11,000
4	GM Kateryna Lagno (RUS)	2545	½	1	½		½	0	½	½	½	1	½	1	6½	0	3	33.75	90	€8,000
5	IM Elisabeth Paehtz (GER)	2479	0	½	½	½		1	½	½	1	½	½	½	6	1	2	31.25	75	€6,250
6	GM Valentina Gunina (RUS)	2502	0	0	½	1	0		1	1	1	½	½	½	6	0	4	29.50	75	€6,250
7	GM Harika Dronavalli (IND)	2503	½	½	0	½	½	0		½	0	½	1	1	5	0	2	24.75	60	€5,000
8	GM Alexandra Kosteniuk (RUS)	2495	½	0	0	½	½	0	½		1	0	½	1	4½	1	2	21.75	45	€4,750
9	IM Alina Kashlinskaya (RUS)	2487	0	0	½	½	0	0	1	0		1	½	1	4½	0	3	20.50	45	€4,750
10	GM Antoaneta Stefanova (BUL)	2491	0	½	0	0	½	½	½	1	0		½	½	4	½	1	20.00	25	€3,250
11	GM Marie Sebag (FRA)	2450	½	0	½	½	½	½	0	½	½	½		0	4	½	0	23.50	25	€3,250
12	GM Pia Cramling (SWE)	2487	0	0	0	0	½	½	0	0	0	½	1		2½	0	1	12.00	10	€2,500

FIDE Women's Grand Prix Stage 2, 2–15 December, 2019, Monte Carlo, Monaco, Category XI (2518.58)
	Player	Rating	1	2	3	4	5	6	7	8	9	10	11	12	Points	TB1	TB2	TB3	Grand Prix Points	Prize money
1	GM Alexandra Kosteniuk (RUS)	2483		½	1	0	1	1	½	½	½	1	1	0	7	1½	5	39.00	133⅓	€12,333.33
2	GM Koneru Humpy (IND)	2574	½		1	½	½	½	½	1	1	½	0	1	7	1½	4	37.25	133⅓	€12,333.33
3	GM Aleksandra Goryachkina (RUS)	2572	0	0		½	½	1	1	½	1	1	½	1	7	0	5	34.00	133⅓	€12,333.33
4	GM Kateryna Lagno (RUS)	2547	1	½	½		0	½	1	0	½	1	½	1	6½	0	4	33.75	90	€8,000
5	GM Anna Muzychuk (UKR)	2537	0	½	½	1		½	½	½	1	½	½	½	6	0	2	32.25	80	€6,750
6	GM Harika Dronavalli (IND)	2518	0	½	0	½	½		½	1	0	½	1	1	5½	1½	3	26.50	60	€5,083.33
7	GM Pia Cramling (SWE)	2461	½	½	0	0	½	½		½	½	½	1	1	5½	1	2	26.50	60	€5,083.33
8	GM Mariya Muzychuk (UKR)	2559	½	0	½	1	½	0	½		½	½	1	½	5½	½	2	29.25	60	€5,083.33
9	GM Zhao Xue (CHN)	2485	½	0	0	½	0	1	½	½		½	½	1	5	½	2	24.25	35	€3,750
10	GM Nana Dzagnidze (GEO)	2520	0	½	0	0	½	½	½	½	½		1	1	5	½	2	23.25	35	€3,750
11	IM Elisabeth Paehtz (GER)	2475	0	1	½	½	½	0	0	0	½	0		1	4	0	2	21.25	20	€3,000
12	GM Valentina Gunina (RUS)	2492	1	0	0	0	½	0	0	½	0	0	0		2	0	1	12.75	10	€2,500

FIDE Women's Grand Prix Stage 3, 1–14 March, 2020, Lausanne, Switzerland, Category XI (2506.08)
	Player	Rating	1	2	3	4	5	6	7	8	9	10	11	12	Points	TB1	TB2	TB3	Grand Prix Points	Prize money
1	GM Nana Dzagnidze (GEO)	2509		½	1	½	1	½	0	½	1	½	½	1	7	½	4	37.25	145	€13,500
2	GM Aleksandra Goryachkina (RUS)	2579	½		½	½	½	1	½	½	1	½	1	½	7	½	3	36.50	145	€13,500
3	IM Zhansaya Abdumalik (KAZ)	2461	0	½		½	½	1	½	½	½	1	1	½	6½	0	3	33.25	110	€10,000
4	IM Alina Kashlinskaya (RUS)	2485	½	½	½		½	½	½	½	0	½	1	1	6	½	2	31.75	85	€7,375
5	GM Anna Muzychuk (UKR)	2535	0	½	½	½		½	½	½	½	½	1	1	6	½	2	30.50	85	€7,375
6	GM Antoaneta Stefanova (BUL)	2453	½	0	0	½	½		1	1	½	½	½	½	5½	2	2	29.00	60	€5,083.33
7	GM Harika Dronavalli (IND)	2517	1	½	½	½	½	0		½	1	½	0	½	5½	½	2	31.25	60	€5,083.33
8	GM Mariya Muzychuk (UKR)	2551	½	½	½	½	½	0	½		½	½	1	½	5½	½	1	29.50	60	€5,083.33
9	GM Ju Wenjun (CHN)	2583	0	0	½	1	½	½	0	½		½	½	½	4½	½	1	24.00	35	€3,750
10	GM Pia Cramling (SWE)	2475	½	½	0	½	½	½	½	½	½		0	½	4½	½	0	25.50	35	€3,750
11	GM Alexandra Kosteniuk (RUS)	2482	½	0	0	0	0	½	1	0	½	1		½	4	½	2	20.50	15	€2,750
12	GM Marie Sebag (FRA)	2443	0	½	½	0	0	½	½	½	½	½	½		4	½	0	21.50	15	€2,750

FIDE Women's Grand Prix Stage 4, 22 May – 2 June, 2021, Caleta Hotel, Gibraltar, Category X (2487.08)
	Player	Rating	1	2	3	4	5	6	7	8	9	10	11	12	Points	TB1	TB2	TB3	Grand Prix Points	Prize money
1	IM Zhansaya Abdumalik (KAZ)	2472		½	½	½	1	1	½	1	1	1	1	½	8½	0	6	43.75	160	€15,000
2	GM Mariya Muzychuk (UKR)	2544	½		1	½	½	½	½	0	½	1	1	1	7	0	4	35.50	130	€12,000
3	IM Gunay Mammadzada (AZE)	2443	½	0		1	½	½	0	1	½	1	½	1	6½	1	4	32.50	100	€9,000
4	GM Kateryna Lagno (RUS)	2546	½	½	0		½	½	½	1	½	1	½	1	6½	0	3	32.25	100	€9,000
5	IM Elisabeth Paehtz (GER)	2456	0	½	½	½		1	½	1	½	0	½	1	6	1	3	30.00	75	€6,250
6	GM Nana Dzagnidze (GEO)	2524	0	½	½	½	0		½	½	1	½	1	1	6	0	3	28.00	75	€6,250
7	GM Anna Muzychuk (UKR)	2535	½	½	1	½	½	½		0	½	1	0	½	5½	0	2	31.25	60	€5,000
8	IM Alina Kashlinskaya (RUS)	2494	0	1	0	0	0	½	1		1	0	½	1	5	0	4	24.00	50	€4,500
9	GM Antoaneta Stefanova (BUL)	2470	0	½	½	½	½	0	½	0		1	1	0	4½	1	2	24.25	35	€3,750
10	GM Valentina Gunina (RUS)	2421	0	0	0	0	1	½	0	1	0		1	1	4½	0	4	20.00	35	€3,750
11	IM Dinara Saduakassova (KAZ)	2500	0	0	½	½	½	0	1	½	0	0		1	4	0	2	19.50	20	€3,000
12	IM Irina Bulmaga (ROU)	2440	½	0	0	0	0	0	½	0	1	0	0		2	0	1	11.50	10	€2,500

== Grand Prix standings ==
160 Grand Prix points were awarded for 1st, 130 for 2nd, 110 for 3rd and then in steps of 10 from 90 for 4th to 10 for 12th place. If players ended up tied on points, points for those places were shared equally.

As Goryachkina was already qualified for the Candidates Tournament, the third place qualified instead of her. The replacements (in italics) were not eligible to qualify for the Candidates.

Rank	Player	Skolkovo	Monaco	Lausanne	Gibraltar	Total	Prize money
1	Aleksandra Goryachkina (RUS)	120	133⅓	145		398⅓	€56,833
2	Humpy Koneru (IND)	160	133⅓			293⅓	€43,333
3	Kateryna Lagno (RUS)	90	90		100	280	€38,000
4	Zhansaya Abdumalik (KAZ)			110	160	270	€35,500
5	Nana Dzagnidze (GEO)		35	145	75	255	€31,500
6	Mariya Muzychuk (UKR)		60	60	130	250	€27,667
7	Anna Muzychuk (UKR)		80	85	60	225	€23,125
8	Alexandra Kosteniuk (RUS)	45	133⅓	15		193⅓	€22,333
9	Dronavalli Harika (IND)	60	60	60		180	€15,167
9	Alina Kashlinskaya (RUS)	45		85	50	180	€16,125
11	Elisabeth Paehtz (GER)	75	20		75	170	€15,500
12	Ju Wenjun (CHN)	120		35		155	€14,750
13	Valentina Gunina (RUS)	75	10		35	120	€12,500
13	Antoaneta Stefanova (BUL)	25		60	35	120	€12,083
15	Pia Cramling (SWE)	10	60	35		105	€11,333
16	Gunay Mammadzada (AZE)				100	100	€9,000
17	Marie Sebag (FRA)	25		15		40	€6,000
18	Zhao Xue (CHN)		35			35	€3,750
19	Dinara Saduakassova (KAZ)				20	20	€3,000
20	Irina Bulmaga (ROU)				10	10	€2,500
