= Rasul Ibrahimov =

Azerbaijani chess grandmaster

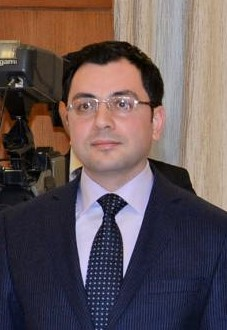

Personal information
- Born: August 13, 1981 (age 44) Baku, Azerbaijan SSR, USSR

Chess career
- Country: Azerbaijan
- Title: Grandmaster (2005)
- FIDE rating: 2527 (July 2026)
- Peak rating: 2568 (October 2008)

Rasul Ibrahimov (born 13 August 1981) is an Azerbaijani chess player who holds the title of Grandmaster (GM). He earned the International Master (IM) title in 2000 and the Grandmaster title in 2005. He was a member of the Azerbaijan Chess Olympiad team in 2002 and 2004. He has served as the coach of top female Azerbaijani chess player Gunay Mammadzada.
