= FIDE Women's Grand Prix 2009–2011 =

Women's chess tournament series

The FIDE Women's Grand Prix 2009–2011 was a series of six chess tournaments exclusively for women, which formed part of the qualification cycle for the Women's World Chess Championship 2011. The winner of the Grand Prix (the one with most Grand Prix points) was to challenge Hou Yifan—the 2010 world champion— in the third quarter of 2011. As Hou Yifan also won the Grand Prix, Koneru Humpy as the runner-up qualified for the championship match.

The final tournament was originally scheduled to take place in Santiago de Chile starting on October 23, 2010. However, due to problems with financing, the host was replaced and the final tournament was then played in Doha, Qatar.

== Format ==
Eighteen of the top female players in the world were to be selected to compete in these tournaments. Each player would contract to participate in exactly 4 of these tournaments. Players must rank their preference of tournaments once the final list of host cities was announced and the dates allocated to each host city.

Each tournament was staged as a 12-player, single round-robin tournament. In each round players scored 1 point for a win, ½ point for a draw and 0 for a loss. Grand prix points were then allocated according to each player's standing in the tournament: 160 points for first place, 130 for second place, 110 for third place, and then 90 down to 10 points for places four to twelve (decreasing by 10 points for each place). Grand Prix points were split between players on equal tournament points.

Players only counted their best three tournament results in the overall standings. The player with the most total grand prix points for those three tournaments was the winner.

== Players and qualification ==
The 18 players qualified were:

- The top four from the World Championship 2008:
  - Alexandra Kosteniuk (declined to participate), Hou Yifan, Pia Cramling, and Koneru Humpy.
- The six highest rated players (average of October 2007 and October 2008 lists) not already qualified:
  - Judit Polgár (declined), Susan Polgar (declined), Xie Jun (declined), Zhao Xue, Marie Sebag, and Zhu Chen.
- Two players nominated by the FIDE president:
  - Nana Dzagnidze and Elina Danielian.
- One nominee from each of the six host cities:
  - Betul Cemre Yildiz (Istanbul), Shen Yang (Nanjing), Zeinab Mamedyarova, Lilit Mkrtchian (Jermuk), Batkhuyag Munguntuul (Ulaanbaataar), and Martha Fierro (Santiago).

The four players who declined to participate were replaced by the following reserves (on rating): Antoaneta Stefanova, Tatiana Kosintseva, Maia Chiburdanidze, and Xu Yuhua. Although Santiago was replaced as host city by Doha, their nominee Fierro was allowed to stay in the series.

Mamedyarova was excluded from the series after the first tournament in Istanbul and replaced by Baira Kovanova due to change of host city to Nalchik. Kosintseva was unable to play in Nanjing and reserve Ju Wenjun took her place in that tournament.

== Tie-breaks ==
With the objective of determining a clear, single winner to play in the championship match in the case that two or more players had equal cumulative points at the top, the following criteria (in descending order) would be utilized to decide the overall winner:

1. The fourth result not already in the top three performances
2. The number of actual game points scored in the four tournaments
3. The number of first-place finishes
4. The number of second-place finishes
5. The number of won games
6. Drawing of lots

== Prize money and Grand Prix points ==
The prize fund was €40,000 per Grand Prix event and €60,000 for the overall Grand Prix placement.

Place	Single Grand Prix event	Overall standings	Grand Prix points
1	€6,500	€15,000	160
2	€4,750	€10,000	130
3	€4,000	€8,000	110
4	€3,750	€7,000	90
5	€3,500	€6,000	80
6	€3,250	€5,000	70
7	€3,000	€4,000	60
8	€2,750	€3,000	50
9	€2,500	€2,000	40
10	€2,250	–	30
11	€2,000	–	20
12	€1,750	–	10

== Schedule and results ==
No.	Host city	Date	Winner	Points (Win/draw/loss)
1	Istanbul, Turkey	7–19 March 2009	Koneru Humpy (India)	8.5/11 (+7=3-1)
2	Nanjing, China	28 September – 10 October 2009	Xu Yuhua (China)	8/11 (+7=2-2)
3	Nalchik, Russia	26 April – 7 May 2010	Tatiana Kosintseva (Russia)	9/11 (+7=4-0)
4	Jermuk, Armenia	24 June – 5 July 2010	Nana Dzagnidze (Georgia)	9/11 (+7=4-0)
5	Ulaanbaatar, Mongolia	30 July – 11 August 2010	Hou Yifan (China)	8/11 (+5=6-0)
6	Doha, Qatar	23 February – 5 March 2011	Koneru Humpy (India); Elina Danielian (Armenia)	8/11 (+6=4-1); 8/11 (+7=2-2)

=== Events crosstables ===
Istanbul, March 2009
		Rating	1	2	3	4	5	6	7	8	9	10	11	12	Score	Tie break
1	(India) Koneru Humpy	2621	-	1	0	½	1	1	1	1	1	½	1	½	8½	
2	(Armenia) Elina Danielian	2496	0	-	½	1	1	½	1	1	1	½	½	1	8	40.25
3	(China) Hou Yifan	2571	1	½	-	0	½	1	1	1	½	½	1	1	8	39.75
4	(China) Zhao Xue	2508	½	0	1	-	0	1	1	½	½	1	1	1	7½	
5	(France) Marie Sebag	2529	0	0	½	1	-	½	1	0	½	½	1	1	6	
6	(Sweden) Pia Cramling	2548	0	½	0	0	½	-	0	1	1	1	½	1	5½	22.75
7	(Ecuador) Martha Fierro	2403	0	0	0	0	0	1	-	½	1	1	1	1	5½	20.00
8	(Bulgaria) Antoaneta Stefanova	2557	0	0	0	½	1	0	½	-	½	½	1	1	5	20.75
9	(Georgia (country)) Maia Chiburdanidze	2516	0	0	½	½	½	0	0	½	-	1	1	1	5	20.25
10	(China) Shen Yang	2448	½	½	½	0	½	0	0	½	0	-	0	0	2½	17.75
11	(Azerbaijan) Zeinab Mamedyarova	2362	0	½	0	0	0	½	0	0	0	1	-	½	2½	10.25
12	(Turkey) Betul Cemre Yildiz	2214	½	0	0	0	0	0	0	0	0	1	½	-	2	

Nanjing, September–October 2009
		Rating	1	2	3	4	5	6	7	8	9	10	11	12	Score	Tie break
1	(China) Xu Yuhua	2485	-	0	½	½	1	1	1	0	1	1	1	1	8	
2	(Georgia (country)) Nana Dzagnidze	2535	1	-	½	0	½	1	0	½	1	1	1	1	7½	
3	(China) Zhao Xue	2542	½	½	-	1	0	0	1	½	½	1	1	1	7	
4	(France) Marie Sebag	2519	½	1	0	-	½	1	0	1	0	1	½	1	6½	33.25
5	(Armenia) Lilit Mkrtchian	2468	0	½	1	½	-	½	½	½	½	½	1	1	6½	30.75
6	(China) Ju Wenjun	2443	0	0	1	0	½	-	1	1	½	½	1	1	6½	29.50
7	(China) Shen Yang	2453	0	1	0	1	½	0	-	½	½	1	½	1	6	
8	(Mongolia) Batkhuyag Munguntuul	2418	1	½	½	0	½	0	½	-	½	0	1	1	5½	20.75
9	(Russia) Baira Kovanova	2408	0	0	½	1	½	½	½	½	-	0	½	1	5	
10	(Qatar) Zhu Chen	2488	0	0	0	0	½	½	0	1	1	-	½	1	4½	
11	(Ecuador) Martha Fierro	2386	0	0	0	½	0	0	½	0	½	½	-	0	2	
12	(Turkey) Betul Cemre Yildiz	2224	0	0	0	0	0	0	0	0	0	0	1	-	1	

Nalchik, April 2010
		Rating	1	2	3	4	5	6	7	8	9	10	11	12	Score	Tie break
1	(Russia) Tatiana Kosintseva	2536	-	1	1	1	½	½	1	½	1	1	½	1	9	
2	(China) Hou Yifan	2585	0	-	0	½	½	1	1	1	½	1	1	1	7½	
3	(Georgia (country)) Nana Dzagnidze	2535	0	1	-	½	½	½	½	½	½	1	1	1	7	33.25
4	(Sweden) Pia Cramling	2535	0	½	½	-	½	1	½	½	½	1	1	1	7	32.25
5	(India) Koneru Humpy	2595	½	½	½	½	-	0	0	0	1	½	1	1	5½	26.75
6	(Qatar) Zhu Chen	2488	½	0	½	0	1	-	0	½	1	½	1	½	5½	26.75
7	(Mongolia) Batkhuyag Munguntuul	2418	0	0	½	½	1	1	-	0	1	0	½	1	5½	25.75
8	(China) Zhao Xue	2542	½	0	½	½	1	½	1	-	0	0	0	1	5	26.75
9	(Armenia) Lilit Mkrtchian	2468	0	½	½	½	0	0	0	1	-	1	1	½	5	24.00
10	(Russia) Baira Kovanova	2408	0	0	0	0	½	½	1	1	0	-	1	1	5	20.00
11	(Turkey) Betul Cemre Yildiz	2224	½	0	0	0	0	0	½	1	0	0	-	½	2½	
12	(Armenia) Elina Danielian	2489	0	0	0	0	0	½	0	0	½	0	½	-	1½	

Jermuk, June–July 2010
		Rating	1	2	3	4	5	6	7	8	9	10	11	12	Score	Tie break
1	(Georgia (country)) Nana Dzagnidze	2535	-	1	1	1	1	½	½	½	1	½	1	1	9	
2	(Russia) Tatiana Kosintseva	2536	0	-	0	½	½	1	½	1	1	1	1	1	7½	
3	(Armenia) Elina Danielian	2489	0	1	-	½	0	½	½	1	1	½	1	½	6½	32.25
4	(Armenia) Lilit Mkrtchian	2468	0	½	½	-	1	0	½	½	1	1	½	1	6½	30.50
5	(Bulgaria) Antoaneta Stefanova	2527	0	½	1	0	-	0	½	1	1	1	½	1	6½	30.00
6	(China) Hou Yifan	2585	½	0	½	1	1	-	1	0	½	0	½	1	6	
7	(Sweden) Pia Cramling	2535	½	½	½	½	½	0	-	½	0	½	1	1	5½	27.25
8	(China) Shen Yang	2453	½	0	0	½	0	1	½	-	½	½	1	1	5½	25.25
9	(Georgia (country)) Maia Chiburdanidze	2506	0	0	0	0	0	½	1	½	-	1	½	1	4½	
10	(China) Xu Yuhua	2485	½	0	½	0	0	1	½	½	0	-	1	0	4	
11	(Russia) Baira Kovanova	2408	0	0	0	½	½	½	0	0	½	0	-	1	3	
12	(Ecuador) Martha Fierro	2386	0	0	½	0	0	0	0	0	0	1	0	-	1½	

Ulaanbaatar, July–August 2010
		Rating	1	2	3	4	5	6	7	8	9	10	11	12	Score	Tie break
1	(China) Hou Yifan	2585	-	½	½	½	½	½	1	½	1	1	1	1	8	
2	(Bulgaria) Antoaneta Stefanova	2527	½	-	0	0	1	½	1	1	½	1	1	1	7½	
3	(India) Koneru Humpy	2595	½	1	-	0	½	1	½	1	½	1	0	½	6½	36.00
4	(China) Zhao Xue	2542	½	1	1	-	0	1	0	0	1	½	½	1	6½	34.75
5	(Russia) Tatiana Kosintseva	2536	½	0	½	1	-	½	½	½	1	0	1	1	6½	32.50
6	(Georgia (country)) Maia Chiburdanidze	2506	½	½	0	0	½	-	1	½	0	1	1	1	6	
7	(China) Xu Yuhua	2485	0	0	½	1	½	0	-	½	½	½	1	1	5½	
8	(China) Shen Yang	2453	½	0	0	1	½	½	½	-	½	½	0	1	5	26.00
9	(Qatar) Zhu Chen	2488	0	½	½	0	0	1	½	½	-	1	1	0	5	25.75
10	(France) Marie Sebag	2519	0	0	0	½	1	0	½	½	0	-	1	½	4	
11	(Mongolia) Batkhuyag Munguntuul	2418	0	0	1	½	0	0	0	1	0	0	-	1	3½	
12	(Turkey) Betul Cemre Yildiz	2224	0	0	½	0	0	0	0	0	1	½	0	-	2	

Doha, February–March 2011
		Rating	1	2	3	4	5	6	7	8	9	10	11	12	Score	Tie break
1	(India) Koneru Humpy	2595	-	1	½	½	0	1	1	½	1	1	½	1	8	41.75
2	(Armenia) Elina Danielian	2489	0	-	1	0	1	1	1	1	½	1	½	1	8	40.25
3	(France) Marie Sebag	2519	½	0	-	1	1	½	0	1	½	1	½	1	7	
4	(Sweden) Pia Cramling	2535	½	1	0	-	1	½	0	0	½	½	1	½	5½	30.50
5	(Georgia (country)) Nana Dzagnidze	2536	1	0	0	0	-	½	1	1	1	0	1	0	5½	29.25
6	(Georgia (country)) Maia Chiburdanidze	2506	0	0	½	½	½	-	0	1	1	1	½	½	5½	26.75
7	(Mongolia) Batkhuyag Munguntuul	2418	0	0	1	1	0	1	-	0	½	0	½	1	5	25.75
8	(China) Xu Yuhua	2485	½	0	0	1	0	0	1	-	0	1	1	½	5	24.75
9	(Armenia) Lilit Mkrtchian	2468	0	½	½	½	0	0	½	1	-	½	0	1	4½	23.50
10	(Ecuador) Martha Fierro	2386	0	0	0	½	1	0	1	0	½	-	½	1	4½	21.00
11	(Bulgaria) Antoaneta Stefanova	2527	½	½	½	0	0	½	½	0	1	½	-	0	4	
12	(Qatar) Zhu Chen	2488	0	0	0	½	1	½	0	½	0	0	1	-	3½	

=== Grand Prix standings ===
The Grand Prix was won by Hou Yifan, but as she was already qualified for the championship match as title holder, runner-up Koneru Humpy qualified as challenger. Her tied first place in Doha was just enough to overtake Nana Dzagnidze and secure second place in the overall standings.

	Player	Istanbul	Nanjing	Nalchik	Jermuk	Ulaanbaatar	Doha	Played	Best 3
1	Hou Yifan (CHN)	120	–	130	(70)	160	–	4	410
2	Koneru Humpy (IND)	160	–	(70)	–	93⅓	145	4	398⅓
3	Nana Dzagnidze (GEO)	–	130	100	160	–	(80)	4	390
4	Tatiana Kosintseva (RUS)	–	–	160	130	93⅓	–	3	383⅓
5	Elina Danielian (ARM)	120	–	(10)	93⅓	–	145	4	358⅓
6	Zhao Xue (CHN)	90	110	(40)	–	93⅓	–	4	293⅓
7	Xu Yuhua (CHN)	–	160	–	(30)	60	55	4	275
8	Marie Sebag (FRA)	80	80	–	–	(30)	110	4	270
9	Antoaneta Stefanova (BUL)	45	–	–	93⅓	130	(20)	4	268⅓
10	Pia Cramling (SWE)	65	–	100	(55)	–	80	4	245
11	Lilit Mkrtchian (ARM)	–	80	40	93⅓	–	(35)	4	213⅓
12	Maia Chiburdanidze (GEO)	45	–	–	(40)	70	80	4	195
13	Batkhuyag Munguntuul (MGL)	–	50	70	–	(20)	55	4	175
14	Shen Yang (CHN)	(25)	60	–	55	45	–	4	160
15	Zhu Chen (QAT)	–	30	70	–	45	(10)	4	145
16	Martha Fierro (ECU)	65	20	–	(10)	–	35	4	120
17	Baira Kovanova (RUS)	–	40	40	20	–	–	3	100
18	Ju Wenjun (CHN)	–	80	–	–	–	–	1	80
19	Betul Cemre Yildiz (TUR)	10	10	20	–	(10)	–	4	40
20	Zeinab Mamedyarova (AZE)	25	–	–	–	–	–	1	25

== See also ==
- FIDE Women's Grand Prix 2011–12, the next series
- FIDE Grand Prix 2008–2010
