= Martha Fierro =

Ecuadorian chess player (born 1977)

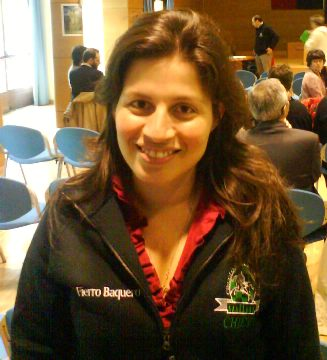
- Fierro in 2010

Personal information
- Born: Martha Lorena Fierro Baquero; September 6, 1977 (age 48) Kingston, Rhode Island, U.S.

Chess career
- Country: Ecuador
- Title: International Master (2005); Woman Grandmaster (2000)
- Peak rating: 2411 (April 2009)

Martha Lorena Fierro Baquero (born September 6, 1977) is an Ecuadorian chess player holding the titles of International Master and Woman Grandmaster, and FIDE International Organizer. She won the American Continental Women's Chess Championship in 2009.

Born in Kingston, Rhode Island, USA, Fierro has been Ecuador's strongest female chess player for many years, and has represented Ecuador in ten biennial Chess Olympiads from 1994 to 2012. In 1998 she played in the open section (with both male and female players), while in the other editions she took part in the women's tournament. Her best results were when she scored 9.5/13 in the 1996 Women's Chess Olympiad in Yerevan, and 7.5/8 in the 2008 Women's Chess Olympiad in Dresden, to win the silver medal on board 1 on both occasions.

Fierro won twice the Pan American Under-18 Girls Championship (in 1994 and 1995) and three times the Pan American Under-20 Girls Championship (in 1995, 1996 and 1997). She took part in the first FIDE Women's Grand Prix series from 2009 to 2011.

Fierro is a vice president of FIDE and a chairperson for the FIDE Commission for Women's Chess (WOM).

On 8 February 2021, she left the Italian city of Genoa, where she lived with her daughter, and went to Ecuador.
