= Menchik =

Menchik is a surname. Notable people with the surname include:

- Olga Menchik (1907–1944), British chess player
- Vera Menchik (1906–1944), British-Russian chess player
