= Xu Yuhua =

Chinese chess grandmaster (born 1976)

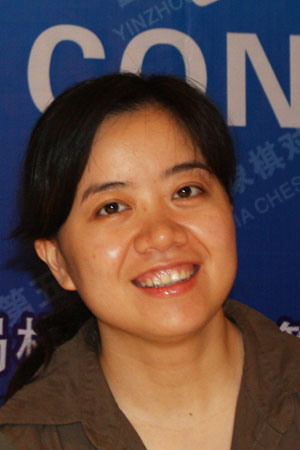
- Xu Yuhua in 2008

Personal information
- Born: 29 October 1976 (age 49) Jinhua, Zhejiang, China

Chess career
- Country: China
- Title: Grandmaster (2006)
- Women's World Champion: 2006–08
- FIDE rating: 2465 (October 2026) [inactive]
- Peak rating: 2517 (April 2006)

Xu Yuhua
- Traditional Chinese: 許昱華
- Simplified Chinese: 许昱华
Transcriptions
Standard Mandarin
- Hanyu Pinyin: Xǔ Yùhua
- Wade–Giles: Hsü^{3} Yü^{4}hua^{2}
- IPA: [ɕù ŷ xwǎ]

Xu Yuhua (Chinese: 许昱华; born 29 October 1976) is a Chinese chess grandmaster and former Women's World Champion (2006–2008). She was China's third women's world chess champion after Xie Jun and Zhu Chen. She has been followed by Chinese women's world chess champions Hou Yifan, Tan Zhongyi, and Ju Wenjun.

== Biography ==
On March 25, 2006 Yuhua won the Women's World Chess Championship knock-out tournament in Ekaterinburg, Russia, defeating Russian IM Alisa Galliamova in the final 2½–½ (in a best-of-four match). The knockout event had 64 participants, with both former world champion Zhu Chen and reigning world champion Antoaneta Stefanova. She became China's 22nd Grandmaster, the 3rd Chinese female grandmaster, by winning the event.

She lost her world championship at the following championship in 2008, which was also a 64-player knockout tournament, when she was knocked out in the second round. She won one of the Grand Prix tournaments in the FIDE Women's Grand Prix 2009–2011, but overall finished seventh, so did not qualify for the 2011 Women's World Championship match.

In 2011, Yuhua was playing for Zhejiang chess club in the China Chess League (CCL). She has not played any FIDE-rated games since 2011.

== Achievements ==
Major successes and titles include:

- Winner of Zonal tournament (1993, 2001)
- Asian junior girls' champion (1996)
- Asian women's champion (1998)
- Women's World Cup winner (2000, 2002)
- Winner of the Chess Olympiads of 2000, 2002 and 2004
- World women's champion (2006–2008)

== Education ==
She is a law graduate.

Education degrees include:

- Master of Literature, Chinese Linguistics, Peking University, 2011
- Bachelor of Law, Jurisprudence, Peking University, 2004

== See also ==
- Chess in China

Preceded by Antoaneta Stefanova	Women's World Chess Champion; 2006–2008	Succeeded by Alexandra Kosteniuk
