= Women's World Chess Championship 1958 =

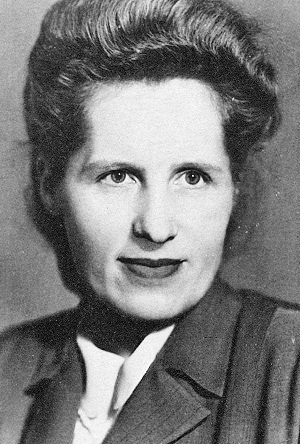
Elisaveta Bykova

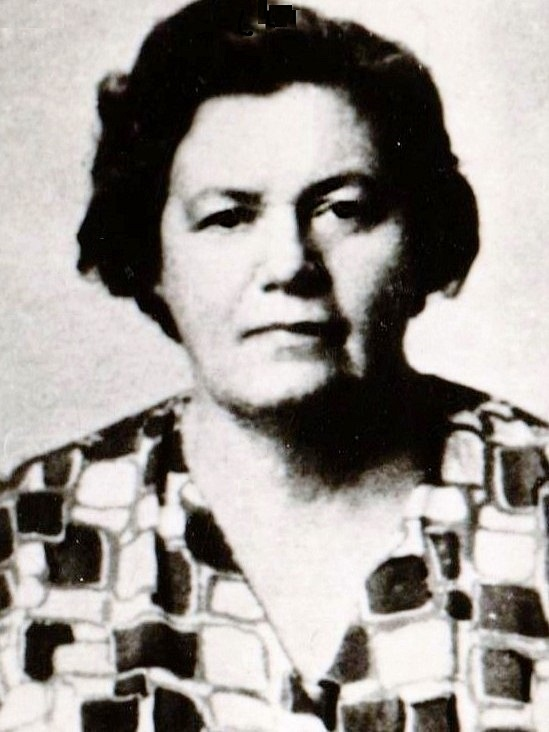
Olga Rubtsova

The 1958 Women's World Chess Championship was a rematch between defending champion Olga Rubtsova and ex-champion Elisabeth Bykova, whom she had won the title from in 1956.

The match was played in Moscow from 4 February to 12 March. It was a 16-game event (the first player to reach 8.5 points will be the winner.) Bykova won the match convincingly, regaining the title.

Women's World Championship Match 1958
	1	2	3	4	5	6	7	8	9	10	11	12	13	14	Total
Elisaveta Bykova (Soviet Union)	0	1	0	½	0	½	1	1	1	1	1	1	0	½	8½
Olga Rubtsova (Soviet Union)	1	0	1	½	1	½	0	0	0	0	0	0	1	½	5½
