= Women's World Chess Championship 2020 =

Chess match between Ju Wenjun and Aleksandra Goryachkina

- Shanghai, China & Vladivostok, Russia
- 5–24 January 2020
	Defending champion	Challenger
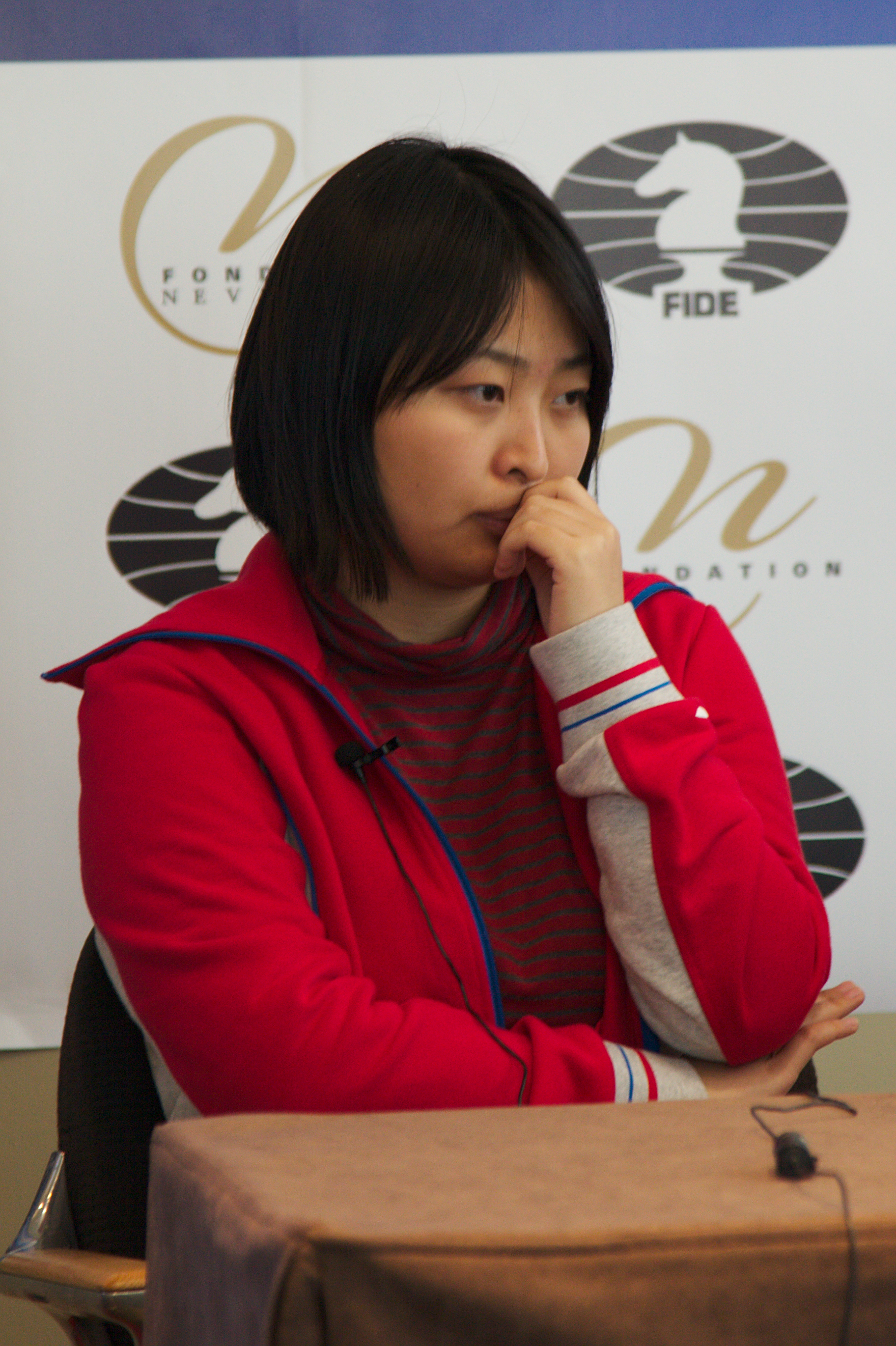
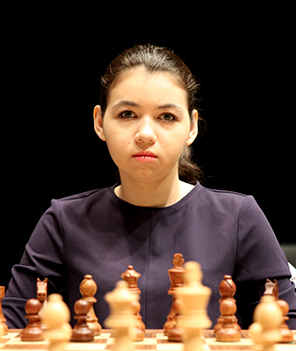
	(China) Ju Wenjun	(Russia) Aleksandra Goryachkina
	6 (2½)	Scores	6 (1½)
Game 1	½	97 move draw	½
Game 2	½	40 move draw	½
Game 3	½	85 move draw	½
Game 4	1	← 63 moves	0
Game 5	0	51 moves →	1
Game 6	½	105 move draw	½
Game 7	½	67 move draw	½
Game 8	0	45 moves →	1
Game 9	1	← 62 moves	0
Game 10	1	← 62 moves	0
Game 11	½	40 move draw	½
Game 12	0	60 moves →	1
Tiebreak Game 13	½	67 move draw	½
Tiebreak Game 14	½	72 move draw	½
Tiebreak Game 15	1	← 45 moves	0
Tiebreak Game 16	½	77 move draw	½
	Born 31 January 1991; 28 years old	Born 28 September 1998; 21 years old
	Winner of the Women's World Chess Championship 2018	Winner of the Women's Candidates Tournament 2019
	Rating: 2584 (World No. 2)	Rating: 2578 (World No. 4)

The 2020 Women's World Chess Championship was a chess match for the Women's World Chess Championship title. It was contested by Ju Wenjun (world champion as winner of the 2018 knock-out championship) and her challenger, Aleksandra Goryachkina, the winner of a newly established Candidates Tournament that was held in 2019.

The match was planned in two parts, one held in Shanghai (China) and one in Vladivostok (Russia), from 3 to 24 January 2020. It marked a return to a match-only format for the title with a qualifying Candidates Tournament, after new FIDE president Arkady Dvorkovich had expressed his dissatisfaction with the knock-out tournaments and resulting frequently changing world champions.

Ju Wenjun successfully defended her title.

== Candidates Tournament ==
The newly-established Candidates Tournament was held from 29 May to 19 June 2019 in Kazan, Russia. The format was an eight-player double round-robin tournament.

Three players qualified by virtue of reaching the semi-finals of the last championship. All remaining players came from the rating list, by taking the average of all twelve monthly ratings in 2018. Aleksandra Goryachkina replaced Hou Yifan, who declined an invitation.

=== Qualifiers ===
Place	Player	Points	Women's world no.	Elo (May 2019)	Women's World champion
1	(Russia) Aleksandra Goryachkina	9.5	9	2522	
2	(Ukraine) Anna Muzychuk	8	7	2539	
3	(Russia) Kateryna Lagno	7	4	2554	
4	(China) Tan Zhongyi	7	10	2513	2017
5	(Georgia (country)) Nana Dzagnidze	6.5	11	2510	
6	(Ukraine) Mariya Muzychuk	6.5	3	2563	2015
7	(Russia) Alexandra Kosteniuk	6	6	2546	2008
8	(Russia) Valentina Gunina	5.5	13	2506	

Goryachkina won with two rounds to spare.

=== Crosstable ===
Leading player after each round in green.

No.	Player	Elo (May 2019)	1		2		3		4		5		6		7		8		Pts	Tie-breaks		Results by round														Place
No.	Player	Elo (May 2019)	1		2		3		4		5		6		7		8		Pts	H2H	Wins	1	2	3	4	5	6	7	8	9	10	11	12	13	14	Place
1	Valentina Gunina (RUS)	2506			1	0	0	0	½	½	0	1	½	1	0	0	1	0	5½			½	½	1½	1½	2	2	3	3½	3½	3½	4½	5½	5½	5½	8
2	Alexandra Kosteniuk (RUS)	2546	0	1			½	0	½	½	1	0	0	1	½	½	½	0	6			½	1	1	1½	2½	2½	3	3	3½	4½	4½	4½	5½	6	7
3	Aleksandra Goryachkina (RUS)	2522	1	1	½	1			1	½	1	½	½	0	½	½	1	½	9½			½	1½	2½	3	4	5	5½	6½	7½	8	8½	9	9½	9½	1
4	Kateryna Lagno (RUS)	2554	½	½	½	½	0	½			½	½	1	½	½	0	1	½	7	1½		½	1	1	2	2½	3½	4	4½	5	5½	6	6	6½	7	3
5	Nana Dzagnidze (GEO)	2510	1	0	0	1	0	½	½	½			1	½	1	0	½	0	6½	1½		½	1½	2½	3½	3½	3½	4	4	4	4½	4½	5½	6	6½	5
6	Mariya Muzychuk (UKR)	2563	½	0	1	0	½	1	0	½	0	½			½	½	½	1	6½	½		½	1	1	1	1½	2½	3	3½	4½	5	5½	5½	5½	6½	6
7	Anna Muzychuk (UKR)	2539	1	1	½	½	½	½	½	1	0	1	½	½			0	½	8			½	½	½	1	1½	2½	3	3½	4½	5	5½	6½	7½	8	2
8	Tan Zhongyi (CHN)	2513	0	1	½	1	0	½	0	½	½	1	½	0	1	½			7	½		½	1	2	2½	2½	2½	2½	3½	3½	4	5	5½	6	7	4

== Championship match ==
As in 2018, the match was divided into two parts, hosted by the countries of the players. One stage was held in Shanghai, China and the other in Vladivostok, Russia. In Shanghai the match was played in the InterContinental Shanghai Jing'An Hotel, in Vladivostok at the Far Eastern Federal University on Russky Island. The format was increased to twelve games, the last championships having consisted of only 10 scheduled games.

The classical time-control portion of the match ended with a tied score of 6-6, after 3 victories for Ju, 3 victories for Goryachkina, and 6 draws. On 24 January, 4 games of rapid chess were used as a tie-breaker; and Ju Wenjun retained the title with 1 win and 3 draws.

=== Schedule ===
The match started off in Shanghai and ended in Vladivostok.

Shanghai	4 Jan	Opening ceremony
Shanghai	5–6 Jan	Games 1–2
Shanghai	8–9 Jan	Games 3–4
Shanghai	11–12 Jan	Games 5–6
Vladivostok	15 Jan	Opening ceremony
Vladivostok	16–17 Jan	Games 7–8
Vladivostok	19–20 Jan	Games 9–10
Vladivostok	22–23 Jan	Games 11–12
Vladivostok	24 Jan	Tiebreak games and closing ceremony

=== Results ===
Women's World Chess Championship 2020
Player	Rating	Standard Time Control												Points	Rapid Tie-Breaks				Tie-Break Points
Player	Rating	1	2	3	4	5	6	7	8	9	10	11	12	Points	R1	R2	R3	R4	Tie-Break Points
Ju Wenjun (China)	2584	½	½	½	1	0	½	½	0	1	1	½	0	6	½	½	1	½	2½
Aleksandra Goryachkina (Russia)	2578	½	½	½	0	1	½	½	1	0	0	½	1	6	½	½	0	½	1½
Game Links																			
