= Women's World Chess Championship 2011 =

International chess competition

	Defending champion	Challenger
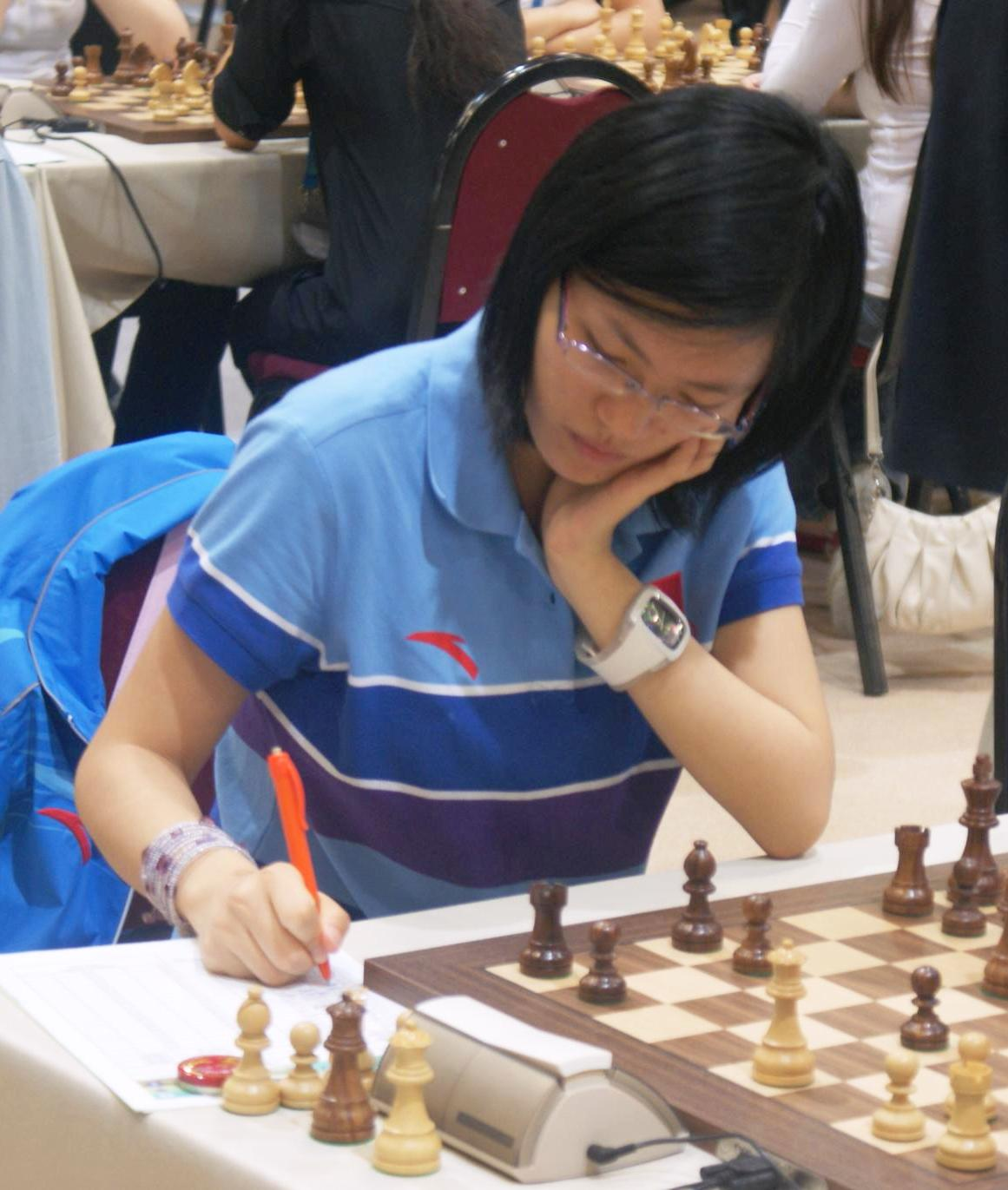
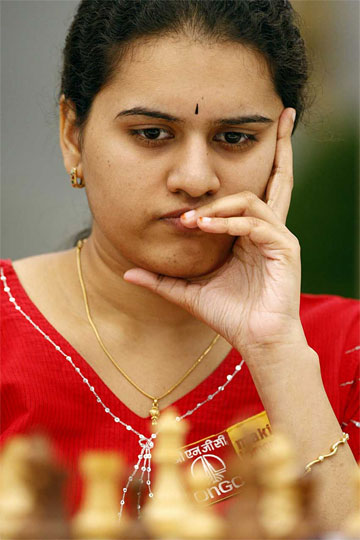
	(China) Hou Yifan	(India) Humpy Koneru
5½	Scores	2½
	Born 27 February 1994; 17 years old	Born 31 March 1987; 24 years old
	Winner of the Women's World Chess Championship 2010	Runner-up of the FIDE Women's Grand Prix 2009–2011
	Rating: 2578 (Women's World No. 3)	Rating: 2600 (Women's World No. 2)

The Women's World Chess Championship 2011 was the 35th of its kind. It was organised by FIDE and was played in a match format between the defending champion and a challenger, determined via the FIDE Grand Prix series.

On 8 August 2011 the match was awarded to Tirana, Albania. The prize fund was $200,000. The match took place from 13 to 30 November 2011. Champion Hou Yifan retained her title, defeating challenger Koneru Humpy by 5½ - 2½.

== Match format ==
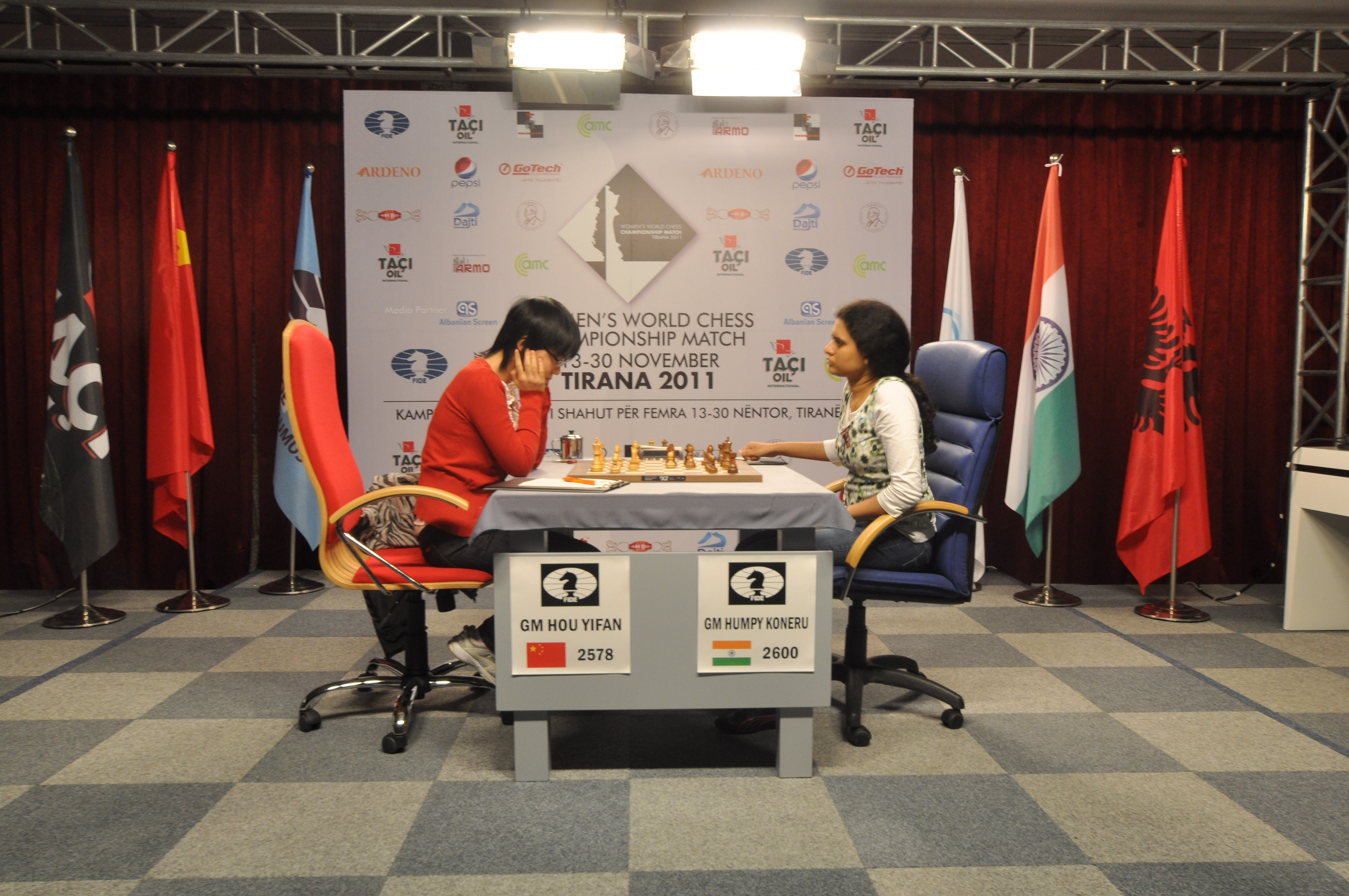
Women's World Chess Championship, Tirana 2011

The match was scheduled to be played over 10 games with classical time controls: 90 minutes for first 40 moves with added 30 minutes for the rest of the game and a 30-second increment per move starting from the first move.

Koneru Humpy played White in the first game. Colours then alternated, except after game 4. The two players were ranked second and third in the world at the time, behind only Judit Polgár.

Should the match have been tied after ten games, tie-breaks would have kicked in. Those were:

- Up to four rapid games (25 minutes per player with a 10-second increment from the first move)
- two rapid games (5 minutes per player with a 3-second increment from the first move)
- One armageddon game that Black only needs to draw to win the match (5 minutes for White and 4 minutes for Black with a 3-second increment from move 61)

=== Match stats ===
Women's World Chess Championship 2011
	Rating	1	2	3	4	5	6	7	8	Total
(India) Koneru Humpy	2600	½	½	0	½	½	0	0	½	2½
(China) Hou Yifan	2578	½	½	1	½	½	1	1	½	5½

After eight out of ten games the match was decided, by Hou Yifan drawing with Black and reaching 5½ points.

== Head-to-head record ==
Prior to the match, Hou Yifan and Koneru Humpy had played 16 games against each other at classical time control with the following statistics:

	Hou Yifan	Draws	Koneru Humpy	Total
Hou Yifan (White) – Koneru Humpy (Black)	5	2	0	7
Koneru Humpy (White) – Hou Yifan (Black)	3	4	2	9
Total	8	6	2	16
