= Koneru Humpy =

Indian chess grandmaster (born 1987)

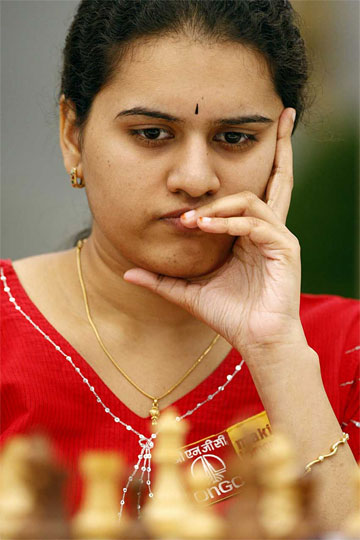
- Humpy in 2012

Personal information
- Born: 31 March 1987 (age 39) Gudivada, Andhra Pradesh, India
- Spouse: Dasari Anvesh (m. 2014)
- Children: 1

Chess career
- Country: India
- Title: Grandmaster (2002)
- FIDE rating: 2520 (November 2026)
- Peak rating: 2623 (July 2009)

Koneru Humpy (born 31 March 1987) is an Indian chess grandmaster. Koneru is a runner-up of the Women's World Chess Championship and two-time Women's World Rapid Chess Champion. In 2002, she became the youngest female player—and the first Indian female player—to achieve the title of Grandmaster, aged 15 years, 1 month, 27 days, a record since surpassed only by Hou Yifan. Koneru is a gold medallist at the Olympiad, Asian Games, and Asian Championship.

In October 2007, she became the second female player, after Judit Polgár, to exceed the 2600 Elo rating mark, being rated 2606, She is the third highest rated woman ever behind Judit Polgár and Hou Yifan.

Koneru won the Women's World Rapid Chess Championship in 2019 and 2024.

== Early life ==
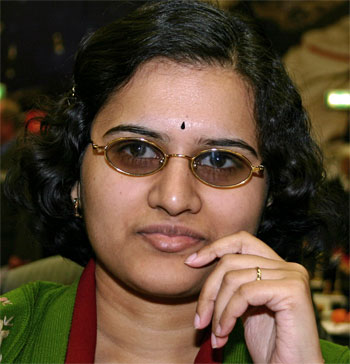
Koneru in Wijk aan Zee, 2006

Koneru Humpy was born in a Telugu family on 31 March 1987 in Gudivada, Andhra Pradesh. She was originally named "Hampi" by her parents, Koneru Ashok and Koneru Latha, who derived the name from the word "champion". Her father later changed the spelling to Humpy, to more closely resemble a Russian-sounding name. She was coached in chess at a young age by her father Ashok after he discovered her talent when she suggested a move as played out by a game from The Chess Informator.

In 1993, when Koneru was six years old, she won the Vijayawada city and Krishna district under-eight championships. She won the State-level championships in 1994 and 1995 and qualified for the national under-eight championship for girls in Madurai in 1995, where she finished fourth. From that year, her father started coaching her exclusively. She would then go on to win the national under-10 championship for girls in 1996 in Mumbai, which led to a qualification for the 1997 World Under-10 Girls Chess Championship at Cannes, France, which she would go on to win.

== Personal life ==
In August 2014, Koneru married Dasari Anvesh. They had a daughter in 2017. Since 2016, Koneru has been working with Oil and Natural Gas Corporation Limited (ONGC).

== Career ==
Koneru won three gold medals at the World Youth Chess Championship: in 1997 (under-10 girls' division), 1998 (under-12 girls) and 2000 (under-14 girls). In 1999, at the Asian Youth Chess Championship, held in Ahmedabad, she won the under-12 section, competing with the boys. In 2001, Humpy won the World Junior Girls Championship. In the following year's edition, she tied for first place with Zhao Xue, but placed second on tiebreak. She became the eighth woman to earn the Grandmaster title in 2002, and the first Indian female player and the youngest female player to do so. She earned her first GM norm at the Hotel Lipa International in June 2001. Her second GM norm was at the 3rd Saturday GM tournament, which she won, in October 2001. She made her final GM norm in the Elekes Memorial, also tying for first place. Humpy competed with the boys in the 2004 World Junior Championship, which was won by Pentala Harikrishna and tied for fifth place, finishing tenth on countback with a score of 8.5/13 points.

Koneru won the British Women's Championship in 2000 and in 2002. In 2003, she won the 10th Asian Women's Individual Championship and the Indian Women's Championship. In 2005, she won the North Urals Cup, a round-robin tournament held in Krasnoturyinsk, Russia featuring ten of the strongest female players in the world at the time.

She participated in the Women's World Chess Championship for the first time in 2004 and since then, she has competed in every edition of the event held with the knockout format. Humpy reached the semifinals in 2004, 2008 and 2010.

In 2009, she tied for 1st–4th with Alexander Areshchenko, Magesh Panchanathan and Evgenij Miroshnichenko in the Mumbai Mayor Cup.

In 2009, Koneru accused the All India Chess Federation of preventing her from participating in the 37th Chess Olympiad in Turin. Her father Koneru Ashok, who was coaching her, was not allowed to travel with her for tournaments.

Koneru took part in the FIDE Women's Grand Prix 2009–2011 and finished in overall second position, in turn qualifying as challenger for Women's World Chess Championship 2011. Hou Yifan won the match, winning three games and drawing five. She finished runner-up in the FIDE Women's Grand Prix series also in the 2011–12, 2013–14, 2015–16 and 2019–21 editions.

She won the individual bronze at the Women's World Team Chess Championship 2015 held in Chengdu, China. Team India finished fourth in the competition – a point behind China, which won the bronze medal.

In December 2019, Koneru won the Women's World Rapid Chess Championship by defeating Lei Tingjie in Armageddon tiebreaks after they both tied on the score 9/12, she was returning from a two-year maternity sabbatical.

In 2020, she won the BBC Indian Sportswoman of the Year award, following a public vote.

She played Board 1 for the Indian Women's team that won bronze medal in the women's section of the 44th Chess Olympiad, this was India's first ever medal at the Women's Chess Olympiads

She won silver medal at the Women's World Rapid Chess Championship, scoring 8½/11 the same as 1st place Anastasia Bodnaruk but lost the tiebreak match.

In December 2024, Koneru won the Women's World Rapid Chess Championship 2024, scoring 8.5/11 and became the Women's World Rapid Chess Champion for the second time in her career.

In July 2025, Humpy participated in the Women's Chess World Cup 2025 as the fourth seed, after receiving a bye in the first round, she defeated Afruza Khamdamova (1½-½), Klaudia Kulon (1½-½), Alexandra Kosteniuk (2½-1½) and Song Yuxin (1½-½) in the subsequent rounds. She faced first seed Lei Tingjie in the semi-finals, they drew their classical games and the first set of rapid tiebreaks, Lei was leading the match after winning first game of the second rapid tiebreaks but Humpy struck back with three consecutive wins to win the match (5-3). Humpy faced fellow Indian Divya Deshmukh in the finals, they drew their classical games and Humpy lost the second game of the first rapid tiebreaks to lose the match (1½-2½). By finishing in top 3 Humpy qualified for the Women's Candidates Tournament 2026.

In December 2025, Humpy finished 3rd in the Women's World Rapid Chess Championship 2025, scoring 8½/11 the same as top 2 Aleksandra Goryachkina and Zhu Jiner but worse tiebreaks.

On March 22, 2026, she withdrew from the Women's Candidates Tournament, citing safety concerns due to the 2026 Iran war, which saw Iranian drone strikes on Cyprus. She was replaced by Anna Muzychuk, who was the highest-finishing player in the FIDE Women's Events 2024-25 who had not already qualified.

She had disappointing campaigns at Norway Chess 2026 Women, where she finished 6th of 6 players and Cairns Cup 2026 where she finished 8th of 10 players (+0-2=7).

In September 2026, Humpy was part of the Indian Women's team that won bronze in the Women's event of the 46th Chess Olympiad, she won the Individual bronze on board 1 with the performance rating of 2543 and score 7/10 (+4-0=6).

== World Titles ==
=== Classical ===
S.No	Year	Tournament	Venue	Result
1	2011	Women's World Chess Championship 2011	Tirana, Albania	Silver
2	2025	Women's Chess World Cup 2025	Batumi, Georgia	Silver

=== Rapid ===
S.No	Year	Tournament	Venue	Result
1	2012	World Rapid Chess Championship	Astana, Kazakhstan	Bronze
2	2019	World Rapid Chess Championship 2019	Moscow, Russia	Gold
3	2023	World Rapid Chess Championship 2023	Samarkand, Uzbekistan	Silver
4	2024	World Rapid Chess Championship 2024	New York City, United States	Gold
5	2025	World Rapid Chess Championship 2025	Doha, Qatar	Bronze

=== Blitz ===
S.No	Year	Tournament	Venue	Result
1	2022	World Blitz Chess Championship 2022	Almaty, Kazakhstan	Silver

== FIDE Women's Grand Prix Titles ==
S.No	Year	Date	Venue	Points (Win/draw/loss)	Result
1	2009	7–19 March 2009	Istanbul, Turkey	8.5/11 (+7=3-1)	Gold
2	2010	30 July – 11 August 2010	Ulaanbaatar, Mongolia	6.5/11	Bronze
3	2011	23 February – 5 March 2011	Doha, Qatar	8/11 (+6=4-1)	Gold
4	2012	10–21 June 2012	Kazan, Russia	7.5/11 (+4 =7 –0)	Gold
5	2012	16–28 September 2012	Ankara, Turkey	8.5/11 (+7 =3 –1)	Gold
6	2013	June 15 – 29 June 2013	Dilijan, Armenia	8/11 (+5=6–0)	Gold
7	2013	17 September – 1 October 2013	Tashkent, Uzbekistan	8/11 (+6=4–1)	Gold
8	2015	2–16 October 2015	Monte Carlo, Monaco	7/11	Bronze
9	2016	1–15 July 2016	Chengdu, China	7/11 (+5=4-2)	Silver
10	2019	10–23 September 2019	Skolkovo, Russia	8/11 (+5=6-0)	Gold
11	2019	2–15 December 2019	Monaco	7/11 (+4=6-1)	Gold - Shared 1st Place
12	2023	1–14 February 2023	Munich, Germany	7/11 (+3=8-0)	Silver
13	2025	17–28 February 2025	Monte Carlo, Monaco	5½/10	Silver - Tied 1st Place
14	2025	14–25 April 2025	Pune, India	7/10	Gold

== Achievements ==
- 1999: Asia's youngest Woman International Master (WIM)
- 2001: India's youngest Woman Grandmaster (WGM)
- 2012: Bronze at Women's World Rapid Chess Championship
- 2019: Skolkovo Women's Grand Prix 2019–20
- 2019: Monaco Women's Grand Prix 2019–20
- 2019: Winner of the Women's World Rapid Chess Championship
- 2020: Gold at Cairns Cup
- 2020: Silver at Speed Chess Championship
- 2020: Gold at FIDE Online Chess Olympiad 2020
- 2021: Bronze at FIDE Online Chess Olympiad 2021
- 2022: Bronze at 44th Chess Olympiad
- 2022: Gaprindashvili Cup Team Winner at 44th Chess Olympiad
- 2022: Silver at Women's World Blitz Chess Championship 2022
- 2023: Silver at Global Chess League
- 2023: Silver at Women's Tata Steel India Chess Tournament Blitz
- 2024: Silver at Women's Candidates Tournament Women's Candidates Tournament 2024
- 2024: Winner of the Women's World Rapid Chess Championship
- 2025: Silver at 2025 FIDE Women's World Cup.
- 2025: Bronze at Women's World Rapid Chess Championship
- 2025: Winner FIDE Women's Events 2024-25.
- 2026: Silver at Global Chess League 2026 with Alpine APL Pipers.
- 2026: Bronze at 46th Chess Olympiad.
- 2026: Individual Bronze on Board 1 at 46th Chess Olympiad.

== Awards ==
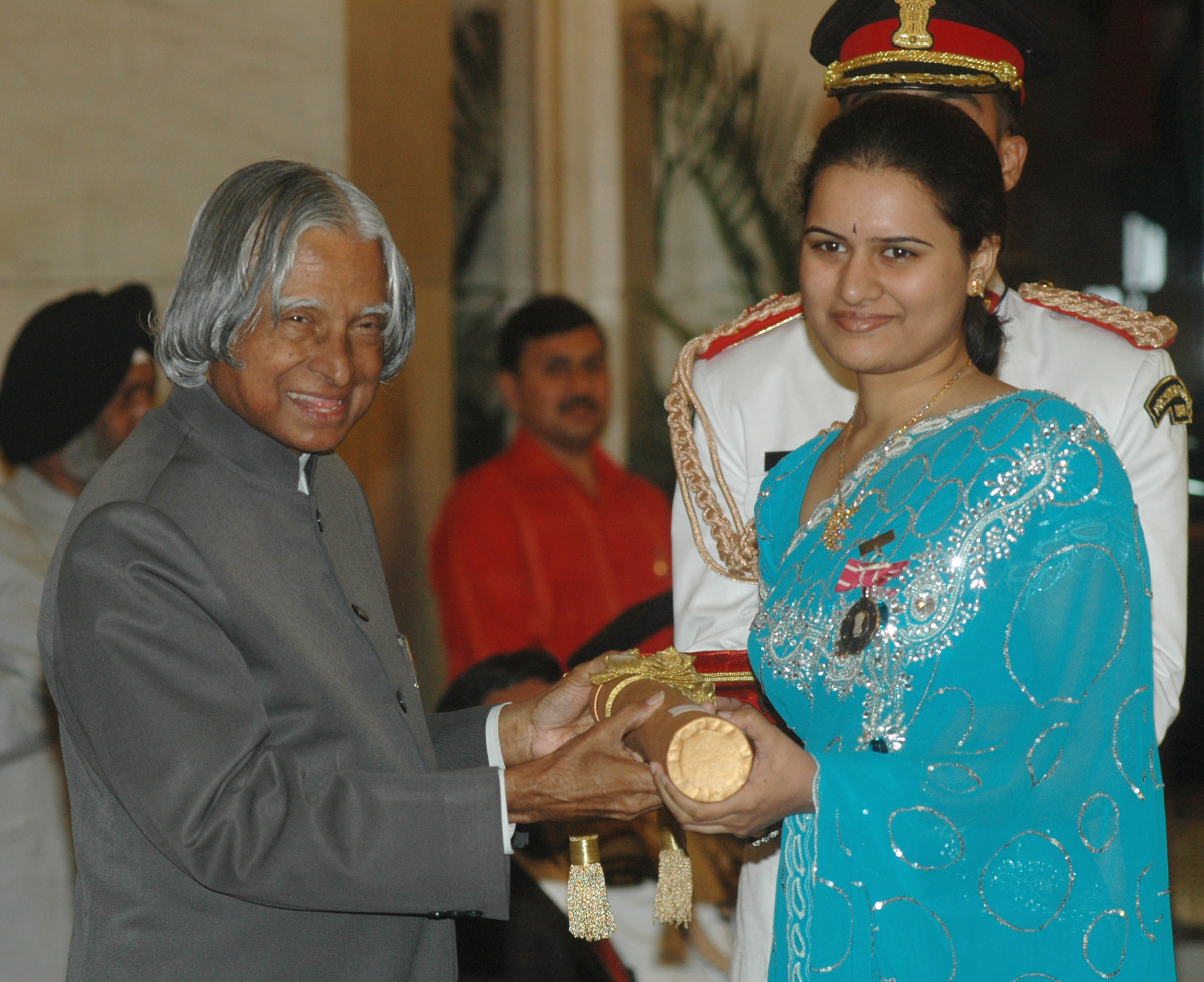
President, A. P. J. Abdul Kalam (left) presenting Padma Shri to Humpy (right), 2007

- 2003: Arjuna Award
- 2007: Padma Shri
- 2021: BBC Indian Sportswoman of the Year
- 2021: Sportstar Aces Sportswoman of the Decade (Individual non-Olympic Sports)
- 2022: Player of the Chess Tournament at PSPB Inter-unit Chess and Bridge Tournament (Mumbai)

== See also ==
- List of female chess grandmasters
- Women's World Chess Championship 2011

Awards and achievements
Preceded by Li Ruofan	Women's Asian Chess Champion; 2003	Succeeded by Wang Yu
