= Antoaneta Stefanova =

Bulgarian chess grandmaster (born 1979)

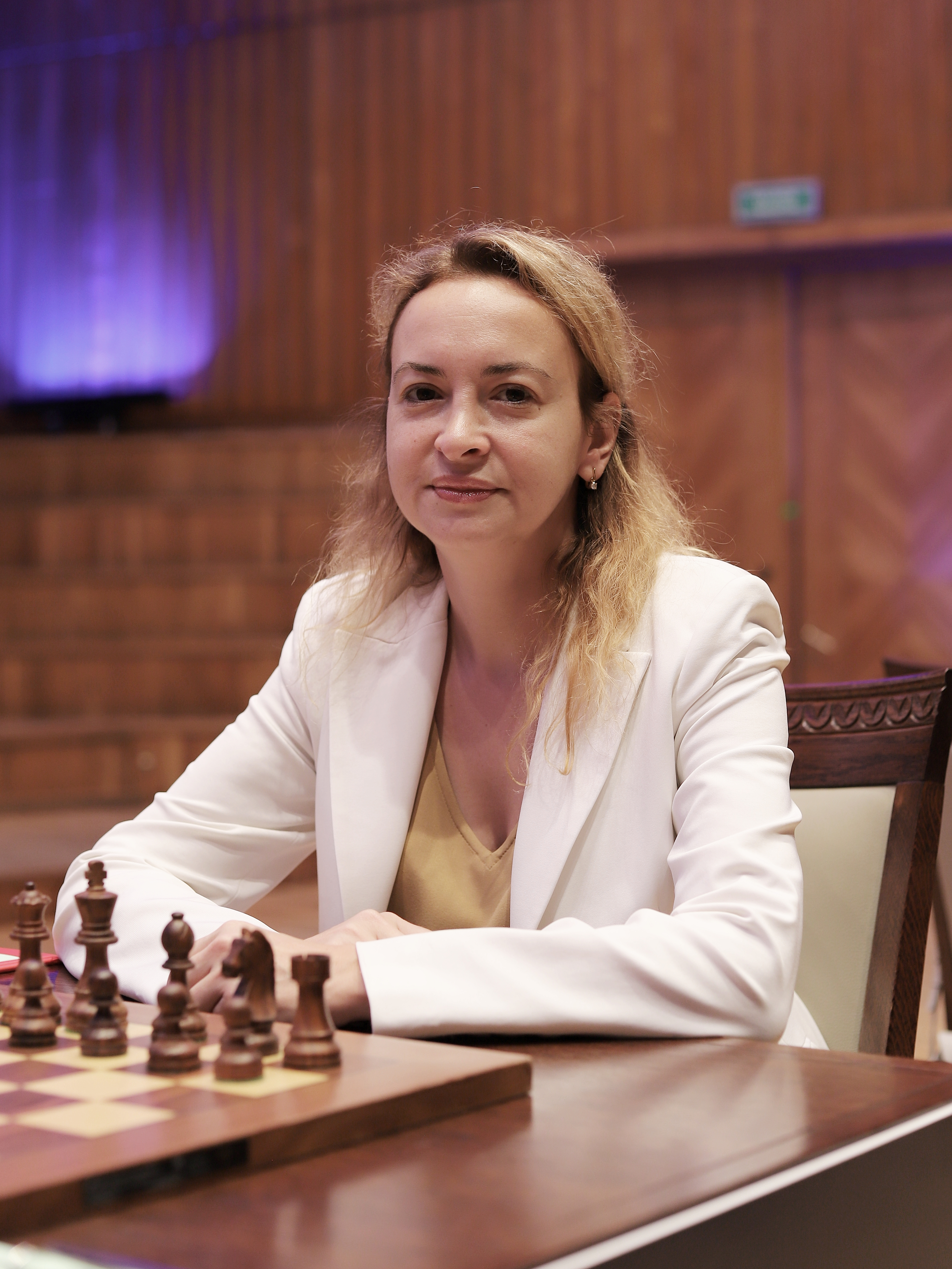
- Stefanova in 2022

Personal information
- Born: 19 April 1979 (age 47) Sofia, Bulgaria

Chess career
- Country: Bulgaria
- Title: Grandmaster (2002)
- Women's World Champion: 2004–2006
- FIDE rating: 2401 (November 2026)
- Peak rating: 2560 (January 2003)
- Peak ranking: No. 2 woman (January 2003)

Antoaneta Andonova Stefanova (Bulgarian: Антоанета Андонова Стефанова; born 19 April 1979) is a Bulgarian chess grandmaster and Women's World Champion from 2004 to 2006. She has represented Bulgaria in the Chess Olympiad in 2000 and the Women's Chess Olympiad since 1992.

== Early life and career ==
Stefanova was born in Sofia, the capital of Bulgaria. When she was four years old, she received chess lessons from her father, Andon Stefanov, a designing artist.

In 1989, Stefanova won the Girls U10 section at the World Youth Chess Festival in Aguadilla, Puerto Rico. In 1992, she played, at the age of 13, in her first Chess Olympiad in Manila, Philippines. In the same year she became European under-14 girls' champion at the European Youth Chess Championship in Rimavská Sobota. Stefanova won the Bulgarian women's championship in 1995.

She tied for fourth place in the 4th Hawaii International Chess Tournament in 1997 scoring 7 points out of 10 games. Thanks to this result Stefanova achieved her first norm for the title Grandmaster. In January 1998, her FIDE rating broke into the top ten of women worldwide. She played in the open section at the 2000 Chess Olympiad. In 2001, Stefanova tied for first place (finishing second on countback) in the 19th Andorra Open.

In June 2002, she won the 3rd European Individual Women's Championship in Varna. Stefanova was awarded the title of Grandmaster at the FIDE Presidential Board meeting in Doha in July 2002 as the ninth woman to ever have reached that rank. At the end of July 2002, she won the Wismilak International Chess Tournament, a category 8 (average rating 2446) round-robin tournament in Surabaya, Indonesia, scoring 9½/11 points with a performance rating of 2750.

She participated in the 2004 Corus B tournament in Wijk aan Zee, the Netherlands: she scored 6/13 points with a rating performance of 2537, placing ninth out of fourteen participants. Stefanova became the tenth Women's World Chess Champion in June 2004 by winning a 64-player knockout tournament held in Elista, Kalmykia, under the auspices of FIDE.

In 2008, she won the North Urals Cup in Krasnoturinsk, Russia, and the women's individual rapid tournament of the 2008 World Mind Sports Games in Beijing. In 2012, Stefanova won the Women's World Rapid Chess Championship. She was the runner-up in the Women's World Chess Championship 2012, losing to Anna Ushenina in the final on the tie-break. In 2017, Stefanova won two gold medals at the IMSA Elite Mind Games in Huai'an, China, in the women's rapid chess event and the women's blitz chess event.

In November 2023 the Bulgarian Women's chess team, with Stefanova as captain, won the European championship.

== Notable game ==
Stefanova vs. Nikolic, 2005

Position: c8 black rook, d8 black rook, g8 black king, a7 black pawn, b7 black pawn, f7 black pawn, h7 black pawn, b6 black queen, f6 black pawn, h6 white queen, d5 white pawn, e5 black pawn, g5 white pawn, h5 white pawn, b3 white pawn, c3 white knight, a2 white pawn, b2 white king, c2 black bishop, e2 white pawn, f2 white pawn, d1 white rook, g1 white rook

After White's 24.g5. Facing mate or decisive material loss, Black resigned.

Stefanova vs. GM P. Nikolic, Wijk aan Zee 2005. In a Catalan Opening, Stefanova castles queenside and gets a kingside attack. Nikolic resigns on Move 24.

== Political career ==
In 2021 she became a Member of Parliament for There Is Such A People and was nominated as the party's candidate for the prime minister position.

Preceded by Zhu Chen	Women's World Chess Champion; 2004–2006	Succeeded by Xu Yuhua
