= Nana Dzagnidze =

Georgian chess grandmaster (born 1987)

- Dzagnidze in 2026

Personal information
- Born: 1 January 1987 (age 39) Kutaisi, Georgian SSR, Soviet Union

Chess career
- Country: Georgia
- Title: Grandmaster (2008)
- FIDE rating: 2467 (November 2026)
- Peak rating: 2573 (June 2015)

Nana Dzagnidze (Georgian: ნანა ძაგნიძე; born 1 January 1987) is a Georgian chess player. She was awarded the title of Grandmaster by FIDE in 2008. Dzagnidze was a member of the gold medal-winning Georgian team in the Women's Chess Olympiad in 2008 and European women's individual champion in 2017.

== Career ==
Dzagnidze won the Girls Under 12 section of the World Youth Chess Championships in 1999. She also won the gold medal at the World Girls Under 20 Championship in 2003, scoring 2 points ahead of the field.

In September 2005 she took part in the sixth Lausanne Young Masters tournament, finishing seventh. Andrei Volokitin won the tournament. At the Gibraltar Chess Festival, Dzagnidze won the prize for the best female player in 2009 and 2011.

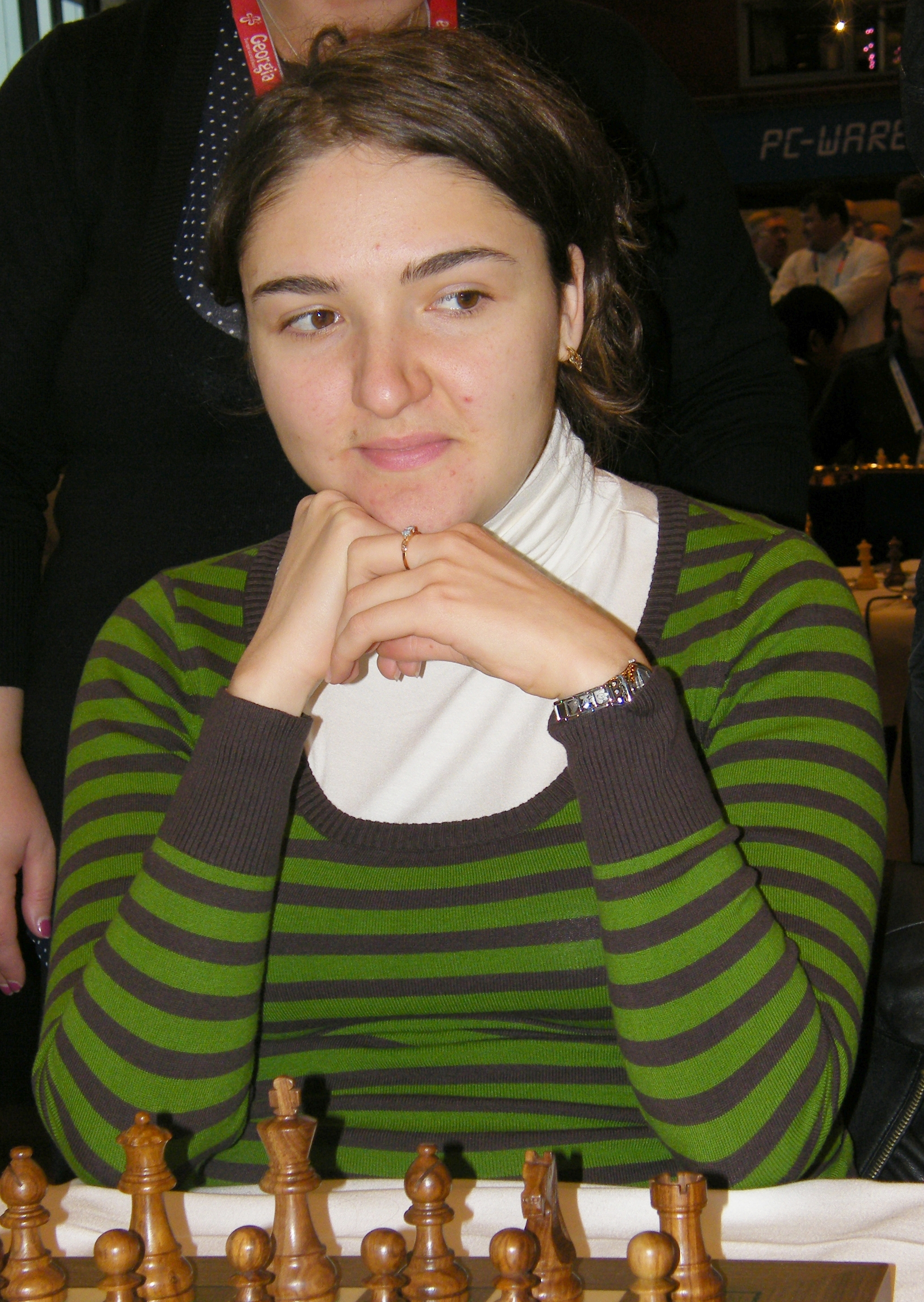
At the Dresden Olympiad

In July 2010 she won in Jermuk the fourth leg of the FIDE Women's Grand Prix series, which was part of the Women's World Chess Championship cycle for 2011. She won seven games and drew four, in the eleven-round round-robin tournament. She finished 1½ points ahead of second-place finisher Tatiana Kosintseva.

In 2017, she won the European Women's Individual Championship in Riga and the Women's World Blitz Chess Championship in Riyadh.

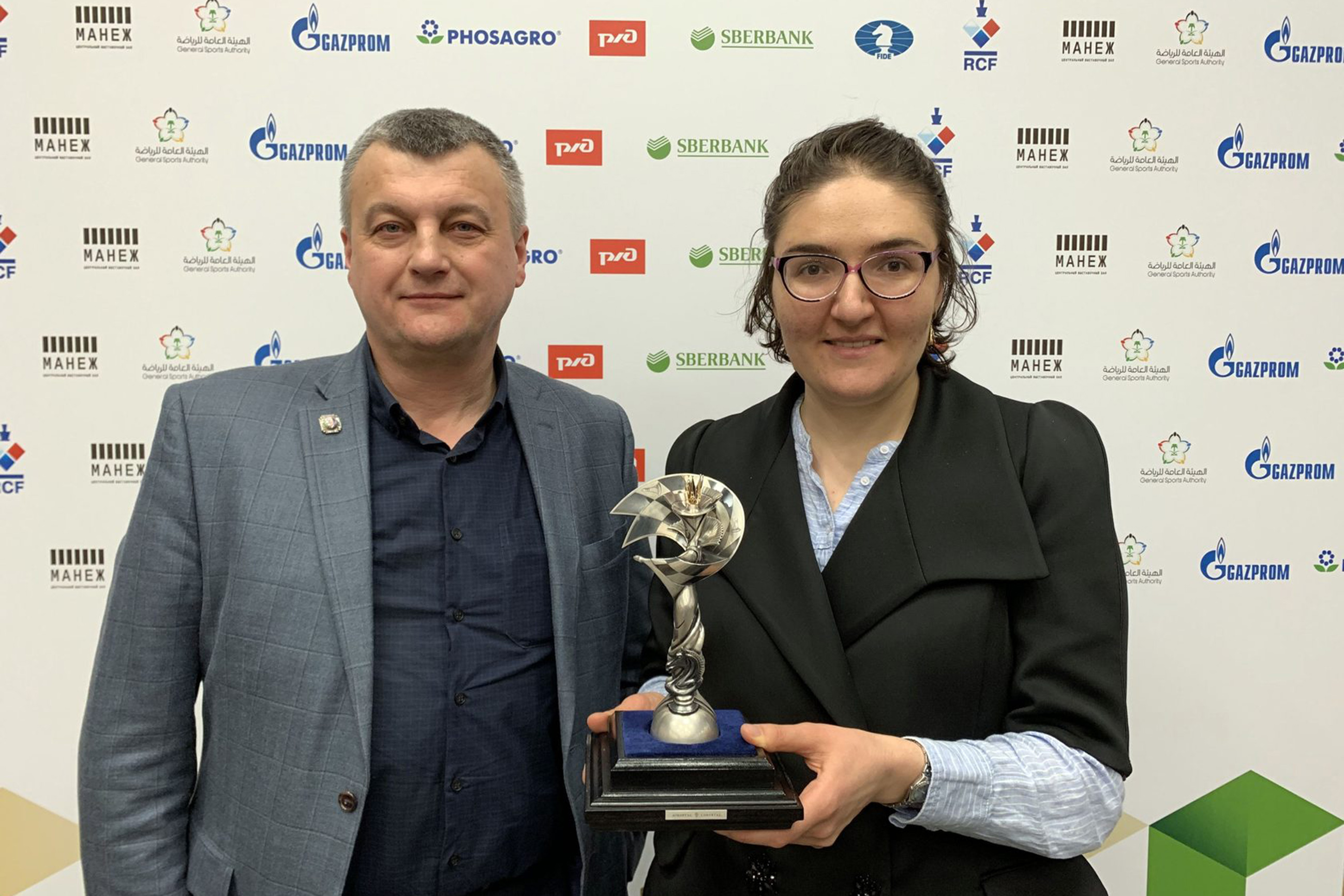
Hand-over of the Women's Chess Award of Caissa to Nana Dzagnidze

The winner of the honorary FIDE award of Caissa as the best female player of the year (2017). Chess Award of Caissa, designed and executed by artisans of the Lobortas Classic Jewelry House, was solemnly presented on December 31, 2018 during the closing ceremony of the 2018 World Rapid & Blitz Chess Championship in Saint Petersburg.

In March 2020, Dzagnidze shared 1st place in the 3rd leg of the FIDE Women's Grand Prix 2019–20 in Lausanne.

=== Team competitions ===
Dzagnidze has played for the Georgian national team in the Women's Chess Olympiad, the Women's World Team Chess Championship and the Women's European Team Chess Championship. Her team won the gold medal at Dresden in 2008; she scored scoring a 7/10 points. In 2014, at the Women's Chess Olympiad in Tromsø, Norway, Dzagnidze won the individual gold medal as the best player on board one, ahead of Hou Yifan. In the Women's World Team Championship, she won the team bronze medal in 2011 and 2017. In the Women's European Team Championship, Georgia won the silver medal in 2005, 2009 and 2017. Dzagnidze won an individual board four gold medal in 2007.

Dzagnidze also won several gold medals in the European Club Cup for Women.
