= Women's World Chess Championship 2018 =

Women's World Chess Championship 2018 can refer to two separate contests in 2018. In that year, World Chess Federation FIDE exceptionally held two consecutive women's championships.

- Women's World Chess Championship 2018 (May)
- Women's World Chess Championship 2018 (November)
