= World Rapid Team Chess Championship 2023 =

August 2023 FIDE event

The World Rapid Team Chess Championship 2023 was a team chess tournament organized by the International Chess Federation (FIDE) to determine the world team champions in chess played under rapid and blitz time controls.

The first tournament took place in Düsseldorf, Germany, from August 26 to 28, 2023.

== Overview ==
The 2023 edition consisted only of a rapid section, with no blitz section.

The FIDE World Rapid Team Championship followed the Swiss system with 12 rounds. The tournament rules required each team to include at least one female player and at least one player who had not achieved a FIDE Standard, Rapid, or Blitz Rating of 2000 Elo points or was unrated.

== Participants ==
The list of participants of the championship included former world champions, such as Viswanathan Anand, Vladimir Kramnik, Hou Yifan, Mariya Muzychuk and Alexandra Kosteniuk, as well as World Championships runners-ups, World Cup winners, and former world champions in rapid and blitz chess.

Approximately 300 participants worldwide, including over 15 Olympic champions, formed up 36 teams to compete.

The highest-rated participants
Achievement	Player	Team	Rating, Rapid (Aug 1, 2023)
Former world champions in classical chess	Viswanathan Anand	Freedom	2751
Former world champions in classical chess	Vladimir Kramnik	Chess pensioners	2739
Former world champions in classical chess	Hou Yifan	WR Chess	2537
Former world champions in classical chess	Alexandra Kosteniuk	WR Chess	2523
Former world champions in classical chess	Mariya Muzychuk	Ashdod Elit Chess Club	2470
World Championships runners-up	Ian Nepomniachtchi	WR Chess	2762
World Championships runners-up	Fabiano Caruana	Kompetenzakademie Allstars	2763
World Championships runners-up	Boris Gelfand	Rishon LeZion Chess Club	2619
World Cup winners	Levon Aronian	Kompetenzakademie Allstars	2763
World Cup winners	Peter Svidler	Chess pensioners	2737
World Cup winners	Jan-Krzysztof Duda	WR Chess	2760
2022 Women's World Blitz Champion	Bibisara Assaubayeva	Uzbekistan	2432
Former world champions in rapid	Nodirbek Abdusattorov	WR Chess	2724
Former world champions in rapid	Daniil Dubov	Freedom	2723
Former world champions in blitz	Maxime Vachier-Lagrave	ASV AlphaEchecs LINZ	2762
Former world champions in blitz	Alexander Grischuk	ASV AlphaEchecs LINZ	2724
Former world champions in blitz	Leinier Dominguez	Chess pensioners	2705
Former world champions in blitz	Kateryna Lagno	ASV AlphaEchecs LINZ	2483

== Favorites and standouts ==
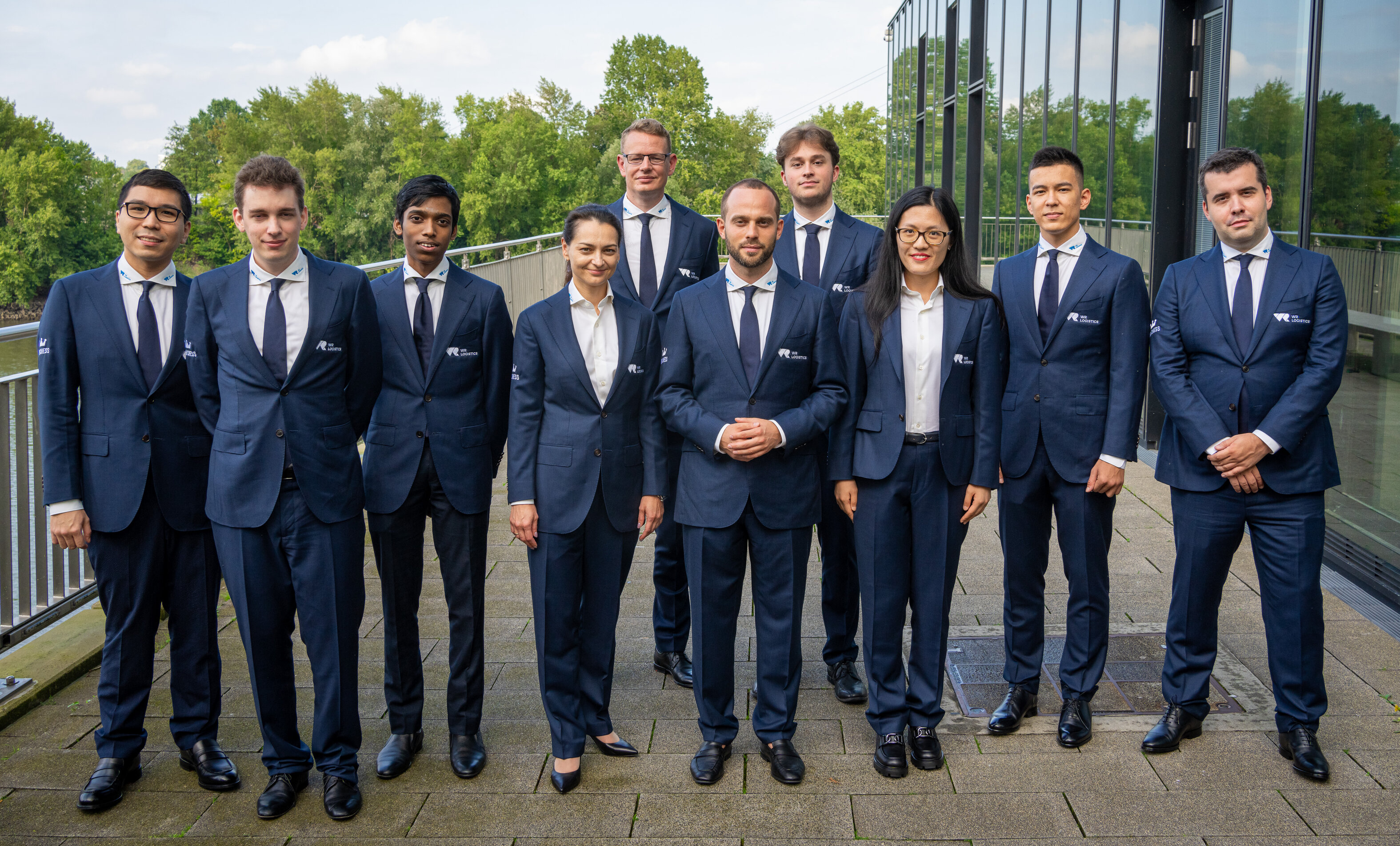
Team WR Chess from left to right: Wesley So, Jan-Krzysztof Duda, Praggnanandhaa R, Alexandra Kosteniuk, Jan Gustaffson, Wadim Rosenstein, Vincent Keymer, Hou Yifan, Nodirbek Abdusattorov, and Ian Nepomniachtchi.

Prior to the start of the tournament, FIDE pointed out the following teams as some of the strongest and clear favorites, due to the squad experience and average team rating

- Freedom (Richard Rapport, Viswanathan Anand, Daniil Dubov, Santosh Gujrathi Vidit, Evgeniy Najer, Polina Shuvalova, Alexander Shapiro);
- WR Chess (Ian Nepomniachtchi, Jan-Krzysztof Duda, Wesley So, Nodirbek Abdusattorov, Vincent Keymer, Praggnanandhaa R, Hou Yifan, Alexandra Kosteniuk, Wadim Rosenstein);
- Kompetenzakademie Allstars (Fabiano Caruana, Levon Aronian, Gukesh D, Sebastian Siebrecht, Nino Batsiashvili, Keti Tsatsalashvili, Rainer Becker, Manfred Schneider);
- Chess Pensioners (Vladimir Kramnik, Peter Svidler, Leinier Dominguez, Darmen Sadvakasov, Jovanka Houska, Kristof Barati, Dennis Koenig, Miron Ananiev, Yaroslav Ananiev).

== Format and rules ==
The FIDE World Rapid Team Championship adopted a team-based Swiss tournament format. Teams, consisting of six to nine players, competed against each other in 15-minute games with an increment of 10 seconds per move. The scoring system awarded teams with 2 points for a win, 1 point for a draw, and 0 points for a loss in each round. The team with the highest amount of match points at the end of the tournament was crowned as the World Team Rapid Champion.

== Prize fund ==
The championship offered a total prize fund of €250,000. In case of a tie, the prize money would be shared equally among the tied teams.

Prize grid
Place	Team prize
1st	€100,000
2nd	€60,000
3rd	€40,000
4th	€25,000
5th	€12,500
1st "Under 2400"	€12,500
Total	€250,000

== Schedule ==
The tournament spanned over three days.

Date	Event	Start time
August 26	Technical meeting	10:30
August 26	Opening ceremony	13:00
August 26	Round 1	13:30
August 26	Round 2	15:30
August 26	Round 3	17:30
August 26	Round 4	19:30
August 27	Round 5	13:30
August 27	Round 6	15:30
August 27	Round 7	17:30
August 27	Round 8	19:30
August 28	Round 9	13:30
August 28	Round 10	15:30
August 28	Round 11	17:30
August 28	Round 12	19:30
August 28	Closing ceremony	21:00

== Results ==
With a record of two draws and ten wins out of 12 matches, the inaugural FIDE World Rapid Team Championship was claimed by the team WR Chess. Securing a total of 22 matchpoints, they emerged victorious. In the second position was team Freedom with 20 matchpoints, while team MGD1 secured the third spot with 18 match points. The fourth place was clinched by Team Armenia, while a surprising fifth place was attained by Team Germany and Friends.

In the crucial Round 5, team WR Chess defeated the first-ranked team Freedom with a distinguished score of 5:1. While Jan-Krzysztof Duda, Praggnanandhaa, Hou Yifan, and Wadim Rosenstein won their games, Wesley So and Ian Nepomniachtchi drew their matches versus Vishy Anand and Daniil Dubov, respectively.

The dynamic squad, Columbus Energy KingsOfChess from Kraków, earned the top spot in the under-2400 rating category. Additionally, the eleven-year-old prodigy Christian Glöckler from Hesse won the special prize for the best game by a young player. Ranked fifth globally in his age group, Glöckler showcased his immense talent, adding to the achievements of German chess.

#	Team	Games	M. Pts	TB1	TB2
1	WR Chess	12	22	702	51
2	Freedom	12	20	582.5	46.5
3	Team MGD1	12	18	628.5	47.5
4	Armenia	12	17	544.5	44
5	Germany and Friends	12	15	533	39.5
6	ASV AlphaEchecs Linz	12	14	549	45
7	Columbus Energy KingsOfChess Kraków	12	14	482	41.5
8	Berlin Chess Federation	12	14	449.5	37.5
9	Six-pack	12	13	497	39.5
10	Chess Pensioners	12	13	485.5	37.5
11	KompetenzakademieAllstars	12	13	473	41
12	Chessbrah OFM	12	13	465.5	43
13	Ashdod Elit Chess Club	12	13	448	37.5
14	FIDE Management Board	12	13	425	38.5
15	Düsseldorfer Schachklub 1914/25 e.V.	12	13	414	39.5
16	Team Chessemy.com	12	13	356	35
17	Rishon LeZion Chess Club	12	12	451	40.5
18	Schachverein Hemer	12	12	364	34.5
19	Doppelbauer Kiel	12	12	353.5	37
20	The Sharks	12	12	353	36
21	Kenya Commercial Bank Chess Club	12	12	284	37
22	Chess Wizzards	12	12	268	37
23	Mitropa Chess Association	12	12	249.5	36.5
24	Blerickse Schaakvereniging	12	12	230.5	35
25	Deutsche Schachjugend 1	12	11	336.5	31
26	Ukrainian Amators	12	11	302.5	29.5
27	Wensing & Pöbel	12	11	286	31
28	Aachener Schachverein von 1856	12	11	274	33.5
29	PhileKhoob Chess Club	12	11	257.5	36
30	Africa	12	10	338.5	33.5
31	Heilbronn Hustlers	12	10	289.5	33.5
32	École Polytechnique Française de Lausanne	12	8	244	34
33	Neustadt Weinstraße	12	6	190	27.5
34	MagdeBurg and Friends	12	6	141.5	22
35	Deutsche Schachjugend 2	12	2	58	10
36	Unischach Bayreuth	12	1	148.5	17
