= Borya Ider =

Mongolian-French chess player (born 1994)

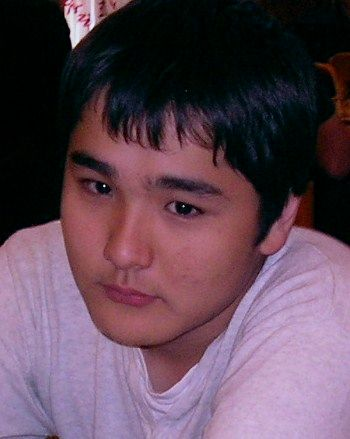
- Ider in 2011

Personal information
- Born: September 24, 1994 (age 32) Mongolia

Chess career
- Country: Mongolia (until 2007); France (since 2007)
- Title: International Master (2014)
- FIDE rating: 2459 (November 2026)
- Peak rating: 2515 (October 2017)

Borya Ider (born in 1994 in Mongolia) is a French chess International master since 2014 and a FIDE master since 2011. He is the 30th best French player. His highest rating was 2515 (in October 2017).

In the 2014 World Junior Championship he ranked 29th with a score of 7.5/13. In the 2017 Tradewise Gibraltar he ranked 77th with a score of 5.5/10. Ider won the 22nd Franconville open.
