= World Rapid and Blitz Team Chess Championships 2024 =

August 2024 FIDE event, Kazakhstan

The World Rapid and Blitz Team Chess Championships 2024 was a team chess tournament organized by the International Chess Federation (FIDE) to determine the world team champions in chess played under rapid and blitz time controls.

The 2024 tournament between club teams included both rapid and blitz time formats. It organized by the International Chess Federation (FIDE) in collaboration with the KazChess/Kazakhstan Chess Federation (KCF), with financial support from Freedom Holding Corp. The tournament took place from August 1 to 5, 2024, in Astana, Kazakhstan.

== Overview ==
According to the tournament regulations, teams consisted of 6-9 players. Matches between teams in both rapid and blitz were played on six boards, with each team required to have at least one female player (5th board) and one amateur player (6th board) whose FIDE rating in any time control—standard, rapid, or blitz—had never reached 2000 Elo points (as of registration). The team captain could be a playing member.

The 2024 World Rapid Team Championship took place from August 2 to 4 and consisted of 12 rounds using a Swiss system.

The 2024 World Blitz Team Championship was held on August 5 in two phases. In the first phase, teams played in a round-robin format in five groups (A, B, C, D, and E) of 8 teams each. The top three teams from each group, along with the best fourth-placed team, advanced to the knockout phase. The draw for the Round of 16 was conducted based on the standings in the groups and the average ratings of the teams. The top 16 teams then competed in a knockout format: Round of 16 — Quarterfinals — Semifinals — Final.

== Participants ==
Over 300 participants from around the world formed 40 teams for the competition. Among the participants were both current (Ding Liren and Ju Wenjun) and former world champions (Magnus Carlsen, Hou Yifan, Alexandra Kosteniuk), as well as vice-champions, World Cup winners, and world champions in rapid and blitz from various years.

Most Notable Participants (Ratings as of August 1, 2024)

Achievement	Player	Team	Rapid Rating	Blitz Rating
Current World Champions	Ding Liren	Decade China Team	2775	2785
	Ju Wenjun	Decade China Team	2540	2500
Former World Champions	Magnus Carlsen	WR Chess Team	2827	2888
	Hou Yifan	WR Chess Team	2550	2529
	Alexandra Kosteniuk	WR Chess Team	2485	2460
Vice-World Champions	Ian Nepomniachtchi	WR Chess Team	2753	2777
	Humpy Koneru	Chessy	2456	2432
World Cup Winners	Jan-Krzysztof Duda	WR Chess Team	2742	2762
	Peter Svidler	Kazchess	2728	2687
	Alexandra Kosteniuk	WR Chess Team	2485	2460
Rapid World Champions	Nodirbek Abdusattorov	WR Chess Team	2732	2669
	Daniil Dubov	Alain ACMG UAE	2716	2802
	Shakhriyar Mamedyarov	Kazchess	2687	2712
	Ju Wenjun	Decade China Team	2540	2500
	Kateryna Lagno	Alain ACMG UAE	2466	2478
	Humpy Koneru	Chessy	2456	2432
	Anna Muzychuk	Chessy	2404	2408
Blitz World Champions	Alexander Grischuk	Kazchess	2670	2681
	Kateryna Lagno	Alain ACMG UAE	2466	2478
	Bibisara Assaubayeva	Kazchess	2434	2457
	Anna Muzychuk	Chessy	2404	2408

Favorites

Before the championship, based on achievements and the average ratings of team participants in rapid, FIDE identified the following teams as favorites:

- WR Chess Team – 2582 (Magnus Carlsen, Ian Nepomniachtchi, Jan-Krzysztof Duda, Nodirbek Abdusattorov, Hou Yifan, Wadim Rosenstein, Praggnanandhaa Rameshbabu, Vincent Keymer, Alexandra Kosteniuk)
- Decade China Team – 2559 (Ding Liren, Wei Yi, Wang Yue, Yu Yangyi, Ju Wenjun, Pang Bo, Li Chao, Xu Xiangyu, Li Deyan)
- Chessy – 2528 (Richard Rapport, Vidit Santosh Gujrathi, Jorden van Foreest, Alexey Sarana, Humpy Koneru, Mukhtar Ainaikul, Aik Martirosyan, Anna Muzychuk, Yagyz Kaan Erdogmus)
- Alain ACMG UAE – 2519 (Vladislav Artemiev, Daniil Dubov, Parham Maghsoodloo, Dmitry Andreikin, Kateryna Lagno, Wafiya Darvish al-Maamari, Volodar Murzin, Zhu Jinyer, Ibragim Galyamzhanuly)
- Kazchess – 2510 (Peter Svidler, Shakhriyar Mamedyarov, Alexander Grischuk, Darmeen Sadvakassov, Bibisara Assaubayeva, Alimzhan Ayapov, Alisher Suleimenov, Aldiyar Ansat, Nurmuhammed Kabinazar)
- Team MGD1 – 2453 (Arjun Erigaisi, Sunilduth Lina Narayanan, Raunak Sadhwani, Baskaran Adhiban, Harika Dronavalli, Mihir Shah, Vijay Pranav, Narayanan Srinath)

== Format and Rules ==
The FIDE World Rapid Team Championship was played with a time control of "15+10" (15 minutes per game with a 10-second increment per move starting from the first). It consisted of 12 rounds using a Swiss system. Teams received 2 points for a win, 1 point for a draw, and 0 for a loss. The team with the highest number of team points became the rapid world champion.

The FIDE World Blitz Team Championship was played with a time control of "3+2" (3 minutes per game with a 2-second increment per move starting from the first). It consisted of two phases. In the first phase, teams played in a round-robin format across five groups (A, B, C, D, and E) of 8 teams each. The top three teams from each group, along with the best fourth-placed team, advanced to the knockout phase, where teams competed in a two-match final. The team winning the final was crowned blitz world champion.

== Prize Fund ==
The total prize fund for the championship was €350,000, distributed as follows:

Place	Rapid	Blitz
1st	€100,000	€40,000
2nd	€60,000	€25,000
3rd	€40,000	€17,500
4th	€25,000	€17,500
5th	€12,500	-
1st "under 2400"	€12,500	-
Total	€250,000	€100,000

== Results ==
The 2024 FIDE World Rapid Team Championship was won by the team "Al-Ain ACMG UAE" (Vladislav Artemiev, Daniil Dubov, Parham Maghsoodloo, Dmitry Andreikin, Kateryna Lagno, Wafiya Darvish al-Maamari, Volodar Murzin, Zhu Jiner, Ibragim Galyamzhanuly), who scored 21 team points (10 wins, 1 draw, and 1 loss) across 12 matches.

The silver medals went to the "Decade China Team" (20 points), while the bronze medals were awarded to last year's champion, the "WR Chess Team" (19 points). The fourth place was taken by "Chessy" (18 points), and the fifth place went to "Team MGD1" (17 points). The prize for teams with an average rating below 2400 was won by "Royal Chess": starting as the 10th seed (2390), they finished 7th (14 points).

The fate of all medal sets was decided literally "at the last moment": the gold was secured for "Al-Ain ACMG UAE" by the first victory (!) of their top player Daniil Dubov, while Hou Yifan's win helped the defending champion "WR Chess Team" maintain third place.

Notable individual results include a sensational defeat of the reigning champion and rating leader "WR Chess Team" by "Chessy" with a score of 5:1 in the fourth round, where Magnus Carlsen (2827), playing white, chose to stop the clock and resign without waiting for the 24th move of the black pieces commanded by Richard Rapport (2702).

Place	Team	Games	Points	TB1	TB2
1	Al-Ain ACMG UAE	12	21	635.5	47
2	Decade China Team	12	20	682	52.5
3	WR Chess Team	12	19	533.5	42.5
4	Chessy	12	18	606	45.5
5	Team MGD1	12	17	583	44
6	Ashdod Chess Club	12	14	545	42.5
7	Royal Chess	12	14	450.5	37
8	Rookies	12	14	432	40
9	GMHans.com	12	13	505.5	37
10	Kazchess	12	13	498.5	40.5
11	Q4Rail Kingsofchess Krakow	12	13	450.5	36.5
12	Hunnu Air	12	13	444	41
13	Theme International Trading	12	13	423	38.5
14	Teniz Kazakhstan	12	13	412.5	39
15	Noval Group Kyrgyzstan	12	13	390	40
16	Greco	12	12	424	42
17	FIDE Management Board	12	12	415.5	36.5
18	World Champions Higher School	12	12	403.5	37
19	Astana-2	12	12	394	38
20	GMs Kazakhstan	12	12	370.5	33
21	Storm of Dragons	12	12	364	38.5
22	Astana-1	12	12	359.5	31
23	Chess Ratel	12	12	350.5	35
24	TKM Chess	12	12	303	38.5
25	Future GM	12	12	275.5	37.5
26	Kyrgyz Chess Academy	12	11	320	34.5
27	Chess Mates	12	11	265.5	34.5
28	Kazakhstan Dream Team	12	11	240.5	30.5
29	Egypt	12	10	329	33.5
30	Helicopter	12	10	271	29.5
31	KRG-Team	12	9	221.5	29.5
32	Abai Chess Team	12	9	220	31.5
33	Chess Empire	12	9	195.5	28.5
34	Chess Dream	12	8	236.5	31
35	VKO Team	12	8	219	29.5
36	Baiterekchess	12	4	190.5	23.5
37	Chessacademy_pvl	12	4	170.5	22.5
38	Abai's Gambit Pioneers	12	4	123	19

Additionally, the top three players on each board were awarded prizes, not just on the six main boards, but across all nine, based on the maximum allowed in the application. The main indicator was the Tournament Performance Rating (TPR), reflecting the level at which a player performed in the tournament, calculated based on the number of games played, points scored, and opponents' ratings.

Gold Medalists by Board:

1. Magnus Carlsen (2827, "WR Chess Team") – 2895 (6½ points out of 8 possible);
2. Wei Yi (2771, "Decade China Team") – 2822 (10/12);
3. Jan-Krzysztof Duda (2742, "WR Chess Team") – 2756 (5½/8);
4. Dmitry Andreikin (2644, "Al-Ain ACMG UAE") – 2815 (9/10);
5. Alexey Sarana (2648, "Chessy") – 2681 (7/10);
6. Klaudia Kulon (2313, "Q4Rail Kingsofchess Krakow") – 2273 (6½/12);
7. Ju Wenjun (2540, "Decade China Team") – 2451 (8/12);
8. Bella Khotenashvili (2399, "Ashdod Chess Club") – 2326 (7/12);
9. Pang Bo (1400, "Decade China Team") – 2624 (11/11).

The 2024 FIDE World Blitz Team Championship was won by the "WR Chess Team" (Magnus Carlsen, Ian Nepomniachtchi, Jan-Krzysztof Duda, Nodirbek Abdusattorov, Hou Yifan, Wadim Rosenstein, Praggnanandhaa Rameshbabu, Vincent Keymer, Alexandra Kosteniuk), who defeated "Team MGD1" in the final over two matches. The bronze medals went to the losing semifinalists – "Chessy" and "Al-Ain ACMG UAE."

In the first stage, 40 teams were divided into 5 groups of 8, which played against each other in a round-robin format, similar to the rapid event: team vs. team on six boards, including a woman (5th board) and an amateur player with a blitz rating below 2000 (6th board). In case of a tie in team points, the Sonneborn-Berger coefficient was used for team (TB1) and individual points (TB2).

Group A:

Place	Team	Games	Points	TB1	TB2
1	WR Chess Team	7	14	38	84
2	GMHans.com	7	12	31.5	60
3	Rookies	7	10	27.5	40
4	Theme International Trading	7	8	23.5	24
5	Kyrgyz Chess Academy	7	6	19	12
6	Chess Empire	7	4	9	4
7	Storm of Dragons	7	2	15	0
8	Baiterekchess	7	0	4.5	0

Group B:

Place	Team	Games	Points	TB1	TB2
1	Al-Ain ACMG UAE	7	12	35	56
2	Team MGD1	7	12	33	60
3	Teniz Kazakhstan	7	10	26.5	36
4	Helicopter	7	6	18	14
5	Egypt	7	5	15.5	10
6	Chess Mates	7	5	14	10
7	Chessacademy_pvl	7	2	8.5	0
8	VKO Team	7	0	5.5	0

Group C:

Place	Team	Games	Points	TB1	TB2
1	Decade China Team	7	14	36.5	84
2	Royal Chess	7	12	33.5	60
3	Greco	7	9	25	34
4	GMs Kazakhstan	7	8	23	28
5	FIDE Management Board	7	7	23	20
6	Chess Ratel	7	3	15.5	3
7	Chess Dream	7	3	8	3
8	ChessStar	7	0	3.5	0

Group D:

Place	Team	Games	Points	TB1	TB2
1	Chessy	7	14	33	84
2	Ashdod Chess Club	7	12	35	60
3	Astana-2	7	10	25	40
4	Noval Group Kyrgyzstan	7	7	24	23
5	World Champions Higher School	7	6	24.5	14
6	Future GM	7	3	11.5	11
7	KRG-Team	7	2	8.5	6
8	Abai's Gambit Pioneers	7	2	6.5	4

Group E:

Place	Team	Games	Points	TB1	TB2
1	Kazchess	7	14	34.5	84
2	Astana-1	7	12	30.5	60
3	Q4Rail Kingsofchess Krakow	7	10	28.5	40
4	Hunnu Air	7	8	26.5	24
5	TKM Chess	7	6	20	12
6	Kazakhstan Dream Team	7	4	12	4
7	Abai Chess Team	7	2	10.5	0
8	ChessStar	7	0	5.5	0

The top three teams from each group advanced to the playoffs, along with the best of the five teams that finished in 4th place – Hunnu Air (Group E). The draw for the round of 16 was conducted based on the teams' placements in their groups and their average ratings. The opponents then faced off in two-match showdowns with alternating colors.

Round of 16:

- WR Chess Team (No. 1) – Hunnu Air (No. 14) – 4½:1½, 4½:1½
- Al-Ain ACMG UAE (No. 2) – Astana-1 (No. 11) – 6:0, 3½:2½
- Greco (No. 15) – Decade China Team (No. 3) – 1½:4½, 2½:3½
- Chessy (No. 4) – Q4Rail Kingsofchess Krakow (No. 12) – 4:2, 4:2
- Rookies (No. 13) – Kazchess (No. 5) – 2½:3½, 2:4
- Team MGD1 (No. 6) – Astana-2 (No. 16) – 5½:½, 4:2
- Teniz Kazakhstan (No. 12) – Ashdod Chess Club (No. 7) – 3:3, 1:5
- GMHans.com (No. 9) – Royal Chess (No. 8) – 3½:2½, 5:1

Quarterfinals:

- GMHans.com – WR Chess Team – 2½:3½, ½:5½
- Decade China Team – Al-Ain ACMG UAE – 3:3, 3:3, 2½:3½
- Kazchess - Chessy – 3:3, 1:5
- Ashdod Chess Club – Team MGD1 – 2:4, 1½:4½

Semifinals:

- Team MGD1 – Al-Ain ACMG UAE – 3:3, 3:3, 5½:½
- WR Chess Team – Chessy – 4½:1½, 3:3

Final:

- Team MGD1 – WR Chess Team – 2½:3½, 3:3

As with the rapid tournament, the top three players on all nine boards were awarded prizes.

Gold Medalists by Board:

1. Ediz Gurell (2465, "Rookies");
2. Ian Nepomniachtchi (2777, "WR Chess Team");
3. Jan-Krzysztof Duda (2762, "WR Chess Team");
4. Praggnanandhaa Rameshbabu (2693, "WR Chess Team");
5. Nodirbek Abdusattorov (2669, "WR Chess Team");
6. Harika Dronavalli (2423, "Team MGD1");
7. Xu Xiangyu (2473, "Decade China Team");
8. Alexandra Kosteniuk (2460, "WR Chess Team");
9. Mukhtar Ainaikul (2025, "Chessy").
