= FIDE Women's Grand Prix 2015–16 =

Women's chess tournament series

FIDE Women's Grand Prix Series 2015-16
Tournament information
- Sport: Chess
- Location: Monaco; Iran; Georgia; China; Russia
- Dates: 2 October 2015–2 December 2016
- Administrator: FIDE
- Format: Series of round-robin tournaments

Final positions
- Champion: (China) Ju Wenjun
- 1st runner-up: (India) Koneru Humpy
- 2nd runner-up: (Russia) Valentina Gunina

The FIDE Women's Grand Prix 2015–16 was a series of five chess tournaments exclusively for women, which determined one player to play in the Women's World Chess Championship Match 2018, a 10-game match against the knockout world champion.

The 2015–2016 edition was the fourth cycle of the tournament series. The top ranked player was Hou Yifan, who won the previous three editions of the Grand Prix, but had withdrawn participation after playing in the first tournament. The overall Grand Prix was won by Chinese player Ju Wenjun, who overtook Koneru Humpy at the last tournament. Koneru Humpy thereby finished overall runner-up for the fourth time.

== Format ==
Originally, the Grand Prix was scheduled as a 4-event tour. However, at the March 2016 FIDE Presidential Board meeting, a fifth event was then added, which replaced the Women's Knockout championship. Originally, 16 players were supposed to participate, though with the expansion the total became 20, along with extras to replace the withdrawn Hou Yifan. Each player participated in exactly 3 events. The players ranked their preference of events once the final list of host cities was announced and the dates were allocated to each host city.

Each event was a 12-player, single round-robin tournament. In each round players scored 1 point for a win, ½ point for a draw and 0 for a loss. Grand Prix points were then allocated according to each player's standing in the tournament: 160 Grand Prix points for first place, 130 for second place, 110 for third place, and then 90 down to 10 points by increments of 10. In case of a tie, the Grand Prix points were shared evenly by the tied players.

The player with the most Grand Prix points was the winner. FIDE reserved the right to change locations and dates, and increase the events to 6 and players to 18, with each player participating in 4 events. Eventually, they expanded the Grand Prix, but not in the contractual manner specified, deciding to add a fifth stop at their Moscow Presidential Board meeting (March 2016). Therefore, approximately 20 players took part in the Grand Prix, each playing 3 events.

== Players and qualification ==
Players invited based on qualifying criteria were:

- The four semi-finalists of the Women's World Chess Championship 2015:
1. (Ukraine) Mariya Muzychuk
2. (Russia) Natalia Pogonina
3. (Sweden) Pia Cramling
4. (India) Harika Dronavalli
- The six highest ranked players (averaged over a year):
1. (China) Hou Yifan
2. (India) Koneru Humpy
3. (Georgia (country)) Nana Dzagnidze
4. (China) Ju Wenjun
5. (Ukraine) Anna Muzychuk
6. (Russia) Valentina Gunina
- Two FIDE presidential nominees
1. (Bulgaria) Antoaneta Stefanova
2. (Russia) Alexandra Kosteniuk
- Five organizer nominees:
1. (France) Almira Skripchenko
2. (Iran) Sarasadat Khademalsharieh
3. (Georgia (country)) Nino Batsiashvili
4. (China) Zhao Xue
5. (Russia) Olga Girya
- Other players appearing in tournaments:
1. (Ukraine) Natalia Zhukova
2. (Georgia (country)) Lela Javakhishvili
3. (Georgia (country)) Bela Khotenashvili
- Two players appearing only one tournament:
1. (Armenia) Elina Danielian
2. (China) Tan Zhongyi

In May 2016, Hou Yifan announced that she was dropping out of the Women's Grand Prix because she disagreed with the process of determining the Women's World Champion. FIDE had kept every second Women's World Championship as a 64-player knockout tournament since 2010, which Hou characterized as a "lottery." The winner of the knockout was the Women's World Champion, and then played the overall winner of the Grand Prix. Hou believed that as the current World Champion, she should defend her title against a challenger (how the World Chess Championship is decided), rather than playing in qualifying tournaments and then having to play against the winner of the knockout tournament. Alternatively, under the current setup, if she won both the knockout tournament and the Grand Prix, she would have to play the player who took second place in the Grand Prix for the title. In the 2013–2014 cycle, Hou was unable to play in the knockout tournament because she had already committed to play in another venue when the knockout tournament was scheduled; therefore, she lost her title to Mariya Muzychuk temporarily and regained it in a match in 2016 (delayed from 2015). Hou also said she would not play in the knockout tournament in the 2015–2016 cycle.

== Prize money and Grand Prix points ==
The prize money for the single tournaments and the overall series stayed the same as the previous year, that is €60,000 per single Grand Prix and €90,000 for the overall Grand Prix finish.

Place	Single Grand Prix event	Overall standings	Grand Prix points
1	€10,000	€25,000	160
2	€8,250	€20,000	130
3	€6,750	€15,000	110
4	€5,750	€10,000	90
5	€5,000	€7,500	80
6	€4,500	€5,500	70
7	€4,250	€4,000	60
8	€4,000	€3,000	50
9	€3,250	–	40
10	€3,000	–	30
11	€2,750	–	20
12	€2,500	–	10

== Tiebreaks ==
With the objective of determining a clear, single winner to play in the Challenger Match, and in case the top two or more players had equal cumulative points, the following criteria (in descending order) were utilized to decide the overall winner:

1. Number of actual game result points scored in the three tournaments.
2. Number of first places (in case of a tie – points given accordingly).
3. Number of second places (in case of a tie – points given accordingly).
4. Number of wins.
5. Drawing of lots.

== Schedule ==
Like the FIDE Grand Prix, the number of tournaments was reduced, here from six to five.

No.	Host city	Date	Winner	Points (Win/draw/loss)
1	Monte Carlo, Monaco	2–16 October 2015	Hou Yifan (CHN)	9/11 (+8=2-1)
2	Tehran, Iran	10–24 February 2016	Ju Wenjun (CHN)	7.5/11 (+4=7-0)
3	Batumi, Georgia	19 April – 3 May 2016	Valentina Gunina (RUS)	7.5/11 (+6=3-2)
4	Chengdu, China	1 – 15 July 2016	Harika Dronavalli (IND); Koneru Humpy (IND)	7/11 (+3=8-0); 7/11 (+5=4-2)
5	Khanty-Mansiysk, Russia	18 November – 2 December 2016	Ju Wenjun (CHN)	7.5/11 (+5=5-1)

== Events crosstables ==
=== Monaco 2015 ===
1st stage, Monte Carlo, Monaco, 2–16 October 2015
	Player	Rating	1	2	3	4	5	6	7	8	9	10	11	12	Total	Rating Change	H2H	Victories	SB	TPR	GP
1	Hou Yifan (CHN)	2671	*	1	0	1	1	½	1	1	½	1	1	1	9	+11	0	8	45.00	2766	160
2	Mariya Muzychuk (UKR)	2528	0	*	1	½	½	½	1	1	½	1	½	½	7	+13	1	4	36.00	2619	120
3	Koneru Humpy (IND)	2578	1	0	*	½	½	1	0	1	0	1	1	1	7	+5	0	6	36.00	2614	120
4	Pia Cramling (SWE)	2513	0	½	½	*	½	½	1	½	½	0	1	1	6	+17	½	3	29.00	2554	85
5	Natalija Pogonina (RUS)	2445	0	½	½	½	*	½	0	1	1	½	½	1	6	6	½	3	28.25	2560	85
6	Alexandra Kosteniuk (RUS)	2525	½	½	0	½	½	*	0	1	½	½	½	1	5½	-1	1	4	26.75	2517	65
7	Antoaneta Stefanova (BUL)	2500	0	0	1	0	1	1	*	0	½	½	½	1	5½	+3	0	2	27.25	2519	65
8	Nana Dzagnidze (GEO)	2573	0	0	0	½	0	0	1	*	1	½	½	1	5	-14	0	4	21.25	2476	50
9	Almira Skripchenko (FRA)	2441	0	½	0	0	½	½	½	0	*	1	½	1	4½	+3	1½	2	20.25	2459	30
10	Natalia Zhukova (UKR)	2485	0	0	0	1	½	½	½	½	½	*	½	½	4½	-5	1	1	22.25	2455	30
11	Anna Muzychuk (UKR)	2549	½	½	1	½	0	½	½	0	0	½	*	½	4½	-15	½	1	26.50	2450	30
12	Sarasadat Khademalsharieh (IRI)	2402	0	½	0	0	0	0	0	0	½	½	0	*	1½	-22	0	0	8.00	2219	10

=== Tehran 2016 ===
2nd stage, Tehran, Iran, 10–24 February 2016
	Player	Rating	1	2	3	4	5	6	7	8	9	10	11	12	Total	Rating Change	H2H	Victories	SB	TPR	GP
1	Ju Wenjun (CHN)	2558	*	½	½	½	1	1	½	½	½	1	1	½	7½	+11	0	4	39.25	2631	160
2	Sarasadat Khademalsharieh (IRI)	2403	½	*	1	½	½	½	0	1	½	½	1	1	7	+31	1	4	36.00	2614	120
3	Zhao Xue (CHN)	2506	½	0	*	1	½	0	1	½	1	1	½	1	7	+15	0	5	35.00	2605	120
4	Natalia Pogonina (RUS)	2454	½	½	0	*	1	1	0	½	1	1	0	1	6½	+18	1	5	34.00	2573	85
5	Nana Dzagnidze (GEO)	2529	0	½	½	0	*	½	1	1	1	0	1	1	6½	+6	0	5	31.50	2566	85
6	Koneru Humpy (IND)	2583	0	½	1	0	½	*	½	1	½	½	1	½	6	-8	0	3	30.50	2532	70
7	Natalia Zhukova (UKR)	2484	½	1	0	1	0	½	*	½	1	0	½	½	5½	+3	0	3	30.50	2505	60
8	Valentina Gunina (RUS)	2496	½	0	½	½	0	0	0	*	½	1	½	1	4½	-9	½	2	22.00	2504	45
9	Harika Dronavalli (IND)	2511	½	½	0	0	0	½	½	½	*	½	1	½	4½	-11	½	1	22.50	2438	45
10	Pia Cramling (SWE)	2529	0	½	0	0	1	½	1	0	½	*	½	0	4	-18	0	2	22.50	2400	30
11	Antoaneta Stefanova (BUL)	2509	0	0	½	1	0	0	½	½	0	½	*	½	3½	-21	½	1	18.75	2370	15
12	Nino Batsiashvili (GEO)	2485	½	0	0	0	0	½	½	0	½	1	½	*	3½	-17	½	1	17.50	2372	15

- Sarasadat Khademalsharieh achieved her first GM norm in nine rounds.

=== Batumi 2016 ===
3rd stage, Batumi, Georgia, 19 April – 3 May 2016
	Player	Rating	1	2	3	4	5	6	7	8	9	10	11	12	Total	Rating Change	H2H	Victories	SB	TPR	GP
1	Valentina Gunina (RUS)	2497	*	1	½	1	1	0	½	1	1	0	1	½	7½	+21	0	6	40.25	2634	160
2	Alexandra Kosteniuk (RUS)	2557	0	*	½	½	1	1	½	½	0	1	1	½	6½	+1	0	4	33.75	2560	130
3	Nino Batsiashvili (GEO)	2476	½	½	*	1	½	0	½	½	1	1	0	½	6	+9	1	3	33.00	2539	100
4	Anna Muzychuk (UKR)	2555	0	½	0	*	1	½	1	½	1	½	½	½	6	-4	0	3	31.25	2532	100
5	Zhao Xue (CHN)	2504	0	0	½	0	*	1	1	½	1	0	½	1	5½	-1	2	4	27.75	2500	70
6	Nana Dzagnidze (GEO)	2535	1	0	1	½	0	*	½	0	½	1	½	½	5½	-6	½	3	31.00	2497	70
7	Almira Skripchenko (FRA)	2453	½	½	½	0	0	½	*	1	½	½	½	1	5½	+8	½	2	29.00	2505	70
8	Mariya Muzychuk (UKR)	2561	0	½	½	½	½	1	0	*	½	1	0	½	5	-15	1½	2	27.00	2459	40
9	Lela Javakhishvili (GEO)	2489	0	1	0	0	0	½	½	½	*	½	1	1	5	-3	1	3	25.50	2466	40
10	Olga Girya (RUS)	2442	1	0	0	½	1	0	½	0	½	*	1	½	5	+5	½	3	27.75	2470	40
11	Elina Danielian (ARM)	2445	0	0	1	½	½	½	½	1	0	0	*	½	4½	-1	0	2	24.25	2441	20
12	Bela Khotenashvili (GEO)	2493	½	½	½	½	0	½	0	½	0	½	½	*	4	-14	0	0	23.00	2399	10

=== Chengdu 2016 ===
4th stage, Chengdu, China, 1–15 July 2016
	Player	Rating	1	2	3	4	5	6	7	8	9	10	11	12	Total	Rating Change	H2H	Victories	SB	TPR	GP
1	Harika Dronavalli (IND)	2526	*	1	½	½	½	½	½	½	1	½	1	½	7	+13	1	3	37.50	2612	145
2	Koneru Humpy (IND)	2575	0	*	½	1	0	½	1	1	½	1	1	½	7	+5	0	5	36.00	2607	145
3	Ju Wenjun (CHN)	2578	½	½	*	½	1	½	0	½	½	½	½	1	6	-6	1½	2	32.00	2541	93⅓
4	Antoaneta Stefanova (BUL)	2512	½	0	½	*	½	½	1	½	1	½	½	½	6	+5	1	2	31.75	2547	93⅓
5	Anna Muzychuk (UKR)	2545	½	1	0	½	*	1	½	½	½	½	½	½	6	-1	½	2	33.25	2544	93⅓
6	Bela Khotenashvili (GEO)	2454	½	½	½	½	0	*	½	1	½	0	½	1	5½	+9	1½	2	29.25	2516	60
7	Zhao Xue (CHN)	2510	½	0	1	0	½	½	*	½	½	½	½	1	5½	+0	1	2	28.50	2511	60
8	Mariya Muzychuk (UKR)	2545	½	0	½	½	½	0	½	*	½	½	1	1	5½	-6	½	2	27.75	2508	60
9	Lela Javakhishvili (GEO)	2487	0	½	½	0	½	½	½	½	*	1	½	½	5	-1	1	1	26.50	2477	35
10	Olga Girya (RUS)	2444	½	0	½	½	½	1	½	½	0	*	½	½	5	+6	0	1	27.25	2481	35
11	Tan Zhongyi (CHN)	2495	0	0	½	½	½	½	½	0	½	½	*	½	4	-12	0	0	21.25	2411	20
12	Pia Cramling (SWE)	2463	½	½	0	½	½	0	0	0	½	½	½	*	3½	-12	0	0	20.00	2383	10

=== Khanty-Mansiysk 2016 ===
5th stage, Khanty-Mansiysk, Russia, 18 November – 2 December 2016
	Player	Rating	1	2	3	4	5	6	7	8	9	10	11	12	Total	Rating Change	H2H	Victories	SB	TPR	GP
1	Ju Wenjun (CHN)	2580	*	1	1	1	½	½	0	½	½	½	1	+	7½	+2	0	4	39.00	2612	160
2	Nino Batsiashvili (GEO)	2489	0	*	0	½	1	½	1	1	1	½	0	1	6½	+10	0	5	33.25	2553	130
3	Valentina Gunina (RUS)	2525	0	1	*	0	½	1	1	0	0	½	1	1	6	-2	2½	5	30.75	2520	82
4	Sarasadat Khademalsharieh (IRI)	2435	0	½	1	*	½	½	½	½	½	1	½	½	6	+14	2½	2	31.50	2529	82
5	Harika Dronavalli (IND)	2543	½	0	½	½	*	½	½	1	½	½	½	1	6	-4	2	2	30.75	2519	82
6	Olga Girya (RUS)	2450	½	½	0	½	½	*	½	½	0	1	1	1	6	+11	1½	3	30.25	2527	82
7	Alexandra Kosteniuk (RUS)	2555	1	0	0	½	½	½	*	½	½	1	1	½	6	-6	1½	3	32.00	2518	82
8	Natalia Zhukova (UKR)	2448	½	0	1	½	0	½	½	*	½	½	½	1	5½	+7	0	2	28.25	2491	50
9	Bela Khotenashvili (GEO)	2426	½	0	1	½	½	1	0	½	*	0	½	½	5	+5	0	2	28.00	2457	40
10	Natalia Pogonina (RUS)	2492	½	½	½	0	½	0	0	½	½	*	½	½	4½	-10	½	0	21.75	2422	25
11	Lela Javakhishvili (GEO)	2461	0	1	0	½	½	0	½	½	½	½	*	½	4½	-6	½	1	24.25	2425	25
12	Almira Skripchenko (FRA)	2455	-	0	0	½	0	0	½	0	½	½	½	*	2½	-21	0	0	13.00	2280	10

== Grand Prix standings ==
At the third tournament it was mentioned top ranked Hou Yifan had withdrawn from the Grand Prix. Koneru Humpy was leading the table after four tournaments. After winning in the tenth round of the last tournament, Ju Wenjun secured the overall Grand Prix win.

Rank	Player	Sep. 2015 Rating	Monte Carlo	Tehran	Batumi	Chengdu	Khanty- Mansiysk	Total
1	Ju Wenjun (CHN)	2542		160		93⅓	160	413⅓
2	Koneru Humpy (IND)	2578	120	70		145		335
3	Valentina Gunina (RUS)	2529		45	160		82	287
4	Alexandra Kosteniuk (RUS)	2530	65		130		82	277
5	Harika Dronavalli (IND)	2508		45		145	82	272
6	Zhao Xue (CHN)	2524		120	70	60		250
7	Nino Batsiashvili (GEO)	2500		15	100		130	245
8	Anna Muzychuk (UKR)	2549	30		100	93⅓		223⅓
9	Mariya Muzychuk (UKR)	2528	120		40	60		220
10	Sarasadat Khademalsharieh (IRI)	2397	10	120			82	212
11	Nana Dzagnidze (GEO)	2573	50	85	70			205
12	Natalia Pogonina (RUS)	2445	85	85			25	195
13	Antoaneta Stefanova (BUL)	2500	65	15		93⅓		173⅓
14	Hou Yifan (CHN)	2671	160					160
15	Olga Girya (RUS)	2483			40	35	82	157
16	Natalia Zhukova (UKR)	2482	30	60			50	140
17	Pia Cramling (SWE)	2513	85	30		10		125
18	Almira Skripchenko (FRA)	2441	30		70		10	110
19	Bela Khotenashvili (GEO)	2502			10	60	40	110
20	Lela Javakhishvili (GEO)	2463			40	35	25	100
21	Elina Danielian (ARM)	2474			20			20
21	Tan Zhongyi (CHN)	2492				20		20

== See also ==
- FIDE Women's Grand Prix 2013–14, the previous cycle
