= Ju Wenjun =

Chinese chess grandmaster (born 1991)

Ju Wenjun 居文君
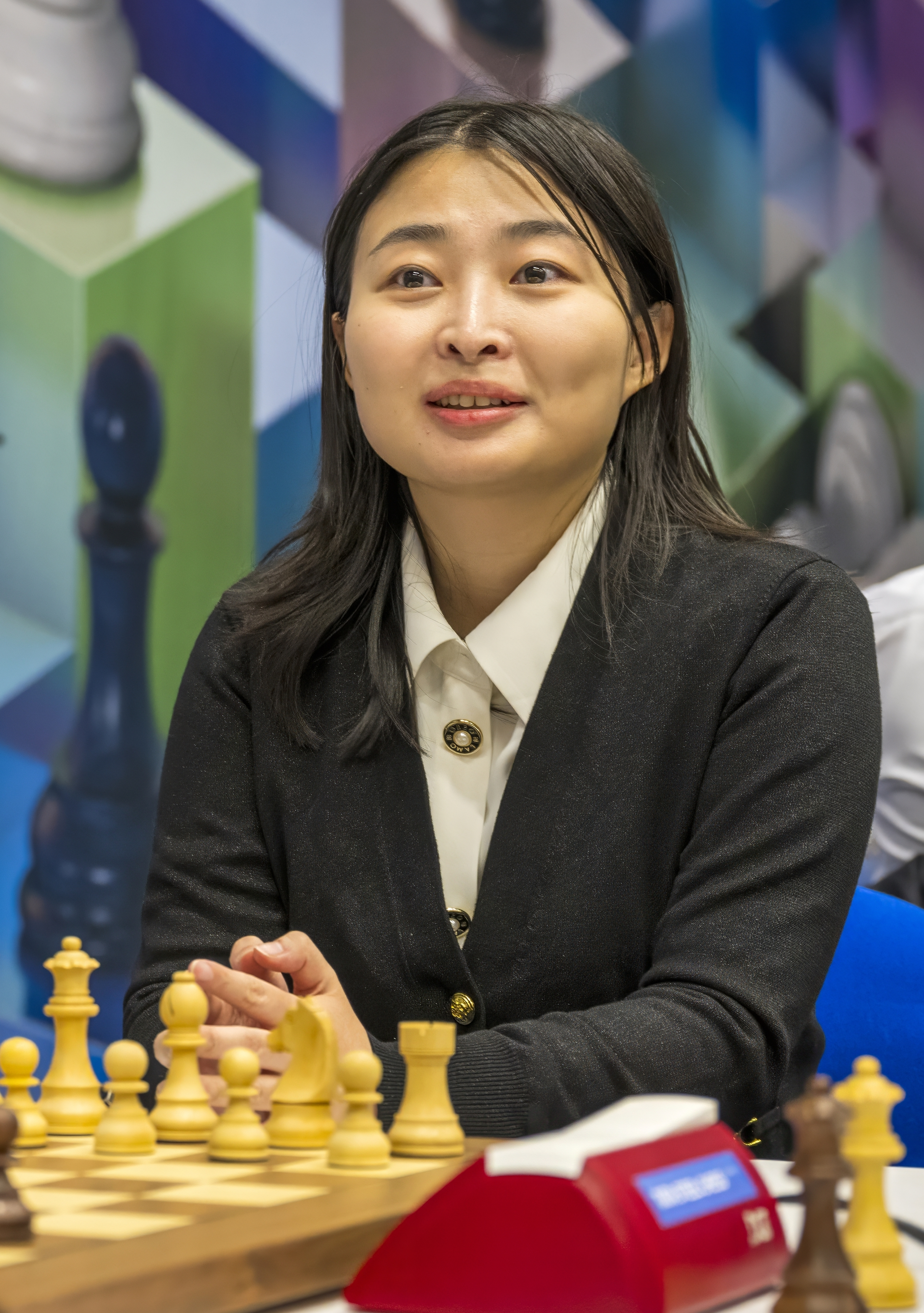
- Ju Wenjun in 2024

Personal information
- Born: 31 January 1991 (age 35) Shanghai, China

Chess career
- Country: China
- Title: Grandmaster (2014)
- Women's World Champion: 2018–present (2018^{May}, 2018^{Nov}, 2020, 2023, 2025)
- FIDE rating: 2553 (September 2026)
- Peak rating: 2604 (March 2017)

Ju Wenjun (Chinese: 居文君; pinyin: Jū Wénjūn; born 31 January 1991) is a Chinese chess grandmaster. She is the reigning five-time Women's World Champion, a former Women's World Blitz Chess Champion, and a two-time Women's World Rapid Chess Champion. In March 2017, she became the fifth woman to achieve a rating of 2600. She first won the title of Women's World Chess Champion in May 2018. She defended her title in November 2018, 2020, 2023, and 2025.

== Career ==
Ju started learning to play chess at the age of seven. She soon went against local players of her age and in national tournaments, performing well in her appearances.

In December 2004, Ju Wenjun tied for the second place at the Asian Women's Chess Championship in Beirut, which earned her an invitation to play in her first Women's World Chess Championship in 2006 where she was eliminated in the third round. Then between 2008 and 2017, Ju played in five matches for the world championship, including Women's World Chess Championship 2008, 2010, 2012, 2015 and 2017, but did not earn the title.

She won the Women's Chinese Chess Championship in 2010 and 2014. In July 2011 she won the Hangzhou Women Grandmaster Chess Tournament, undefeated with a score of 6½/9 points and ahead of the women's world champion of that time, Hou Yifan. She took the second place at the Nalchik stage of the FIDE Women's Grand Prix 2011–12 with 7/11, ranked only after her compatriot Zhao Xue; her performance was enough to acquire her third and final norm required for the Grandmaster title. However, one of the three norms was missing the signature of the arbiter, disqualifying her for the title consideration. In the 5th stage of the FIDE Women's Grand Prix 2013–14 held in Lopota Resort, Georgia, she finished jointly second with Elina Danielian and a 7/11 score. This marks her fourth GM norm. In the 6th stage of the FIDE Women's Grand Prix 2013–14 held in Sharjah, United Arab Emirates, from August 24 to September 7, 2014 she placed joint first with Hou Yifan with a score of 8½/11, winning the event thanks to a better tiebreak score.

In November 2014, FIDE awarded her the GM title in the 4th quarter Presidential Board meeting in Sochi, Russia. With six GM norms, including three norms from the Women's Grand Prix (1 from each series), she became China's 31st grandmaster and the 31st woman to hold the title. Also in 2014, she tied for first with Lei Tingjie in the 4th China Women Masters Tournament in Wuxi. In December 2017, Ju won the Women's World Rapid Chess Championship in Riyadh, and won in the same championship held in St. Petersburg in December 2018, scoring 11½/15 (+8=7) and 10/12 (+8=4), respectively.

Ju Wenjun won FIDE Women's Grand Prix 2015–16, which qualified her for Women's World Chess Championship 2017 challenging incumbent champion Tan Zhongyi. Ju won the match with a score of 5½–4½ in May 2018, becoming the Women's World Chess Champion. The next Women's World Chess Championship held in November 2018 was decided by a 64-player knockout tournament. Ju won the tournament, retaining her title. Since then, she has defended her title in matches three times: first against Aleksandra Goryachkina in the Women's World Chess Championship 2020 (6–6; 2½–1½ in tiebreaks), then against Lei Tingjie in the Women's World Chess Championship 2023 (6½–5½), and most recently in the Women's World Chess Championship 2025 (6½–2½) against Tan Zhongyi. In March 2017, she became the fifth woman to achieve a rating of 2600.

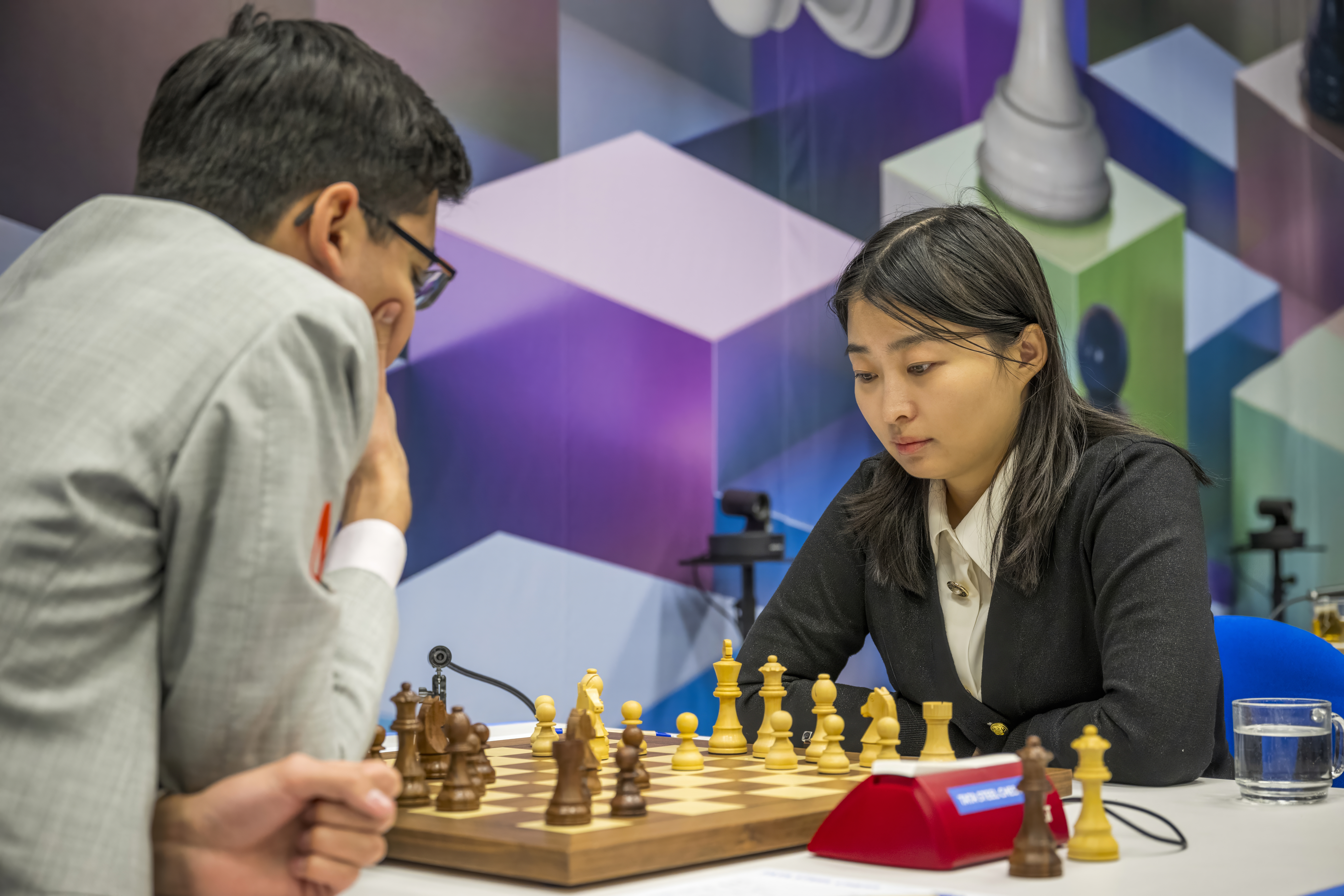
Ju Wenjun playing Anish Giri in Round 1 of the Tata Steel Chess Tournament 2024

Ju earned the biggest win of her career in the fifth round of the Tata Steel Chess Tournament 2024, defeating then world number 6 Alireza Firouzja. She also drew the reigning World Champion Ding Liren in the final round, and eventually finished the tournament in 10th with 4½/13 (+1−5=7), gaining 9.7 rating points. In December 2024 she won the Women's World Blitz Chess Championship.

=== Team events ===
Ju Wenjun has played for the Chinese national women's team since 2008. Her team has won the gold medal in the 42nd Chess Olympiad (in 2016 and 2018), Women's World Team Chess Championship (2009 and 2011), Women's Asian Nations Chess Cup (2012, 2014 and 2016), and 2010 Asian Games. She was part of the Dragon Chilling team that won double gold at World Rapid and Blitz Team Chess Championships 2026.

She plays for the Shanghai chess club in the China Chess League (CCL). In 2013, she won the silver medal with team Shanghai in the Asian Cities Chess Championship in Dubai.

== Playing style ==
With five Women's World Championship titles, she is regarded as one of the most accomplished female players.

== Personal life ==
Ju graduated from Shanghai University of Finance and Economics in 2015.

== Honours ==
Major international and national achievements
Competition	Gold	Silver	Bronze	Total
Women's World Chess Championship	5	0	0	5
Chess Olympiad	3	5	1	9
World Rapid Chess Championship	2	1	0	3
World Blitz Chess Championship	1	0	0	1
World Team Chess Championship	2	2	1	5
Asian Team Chess Championship	3	0	0	3
Chinese Women's Chess Championship	2	0	1	3
Would Rapid Team Chess Championship	1	1	0	2
World Blitz Team Chess Championship	1	0	0	1
Total	20	9	3	32

== See also ==
- Chess in China
- Women in chess
