= Hou Yifan =

Chinese chess grandmaster (born 1994)

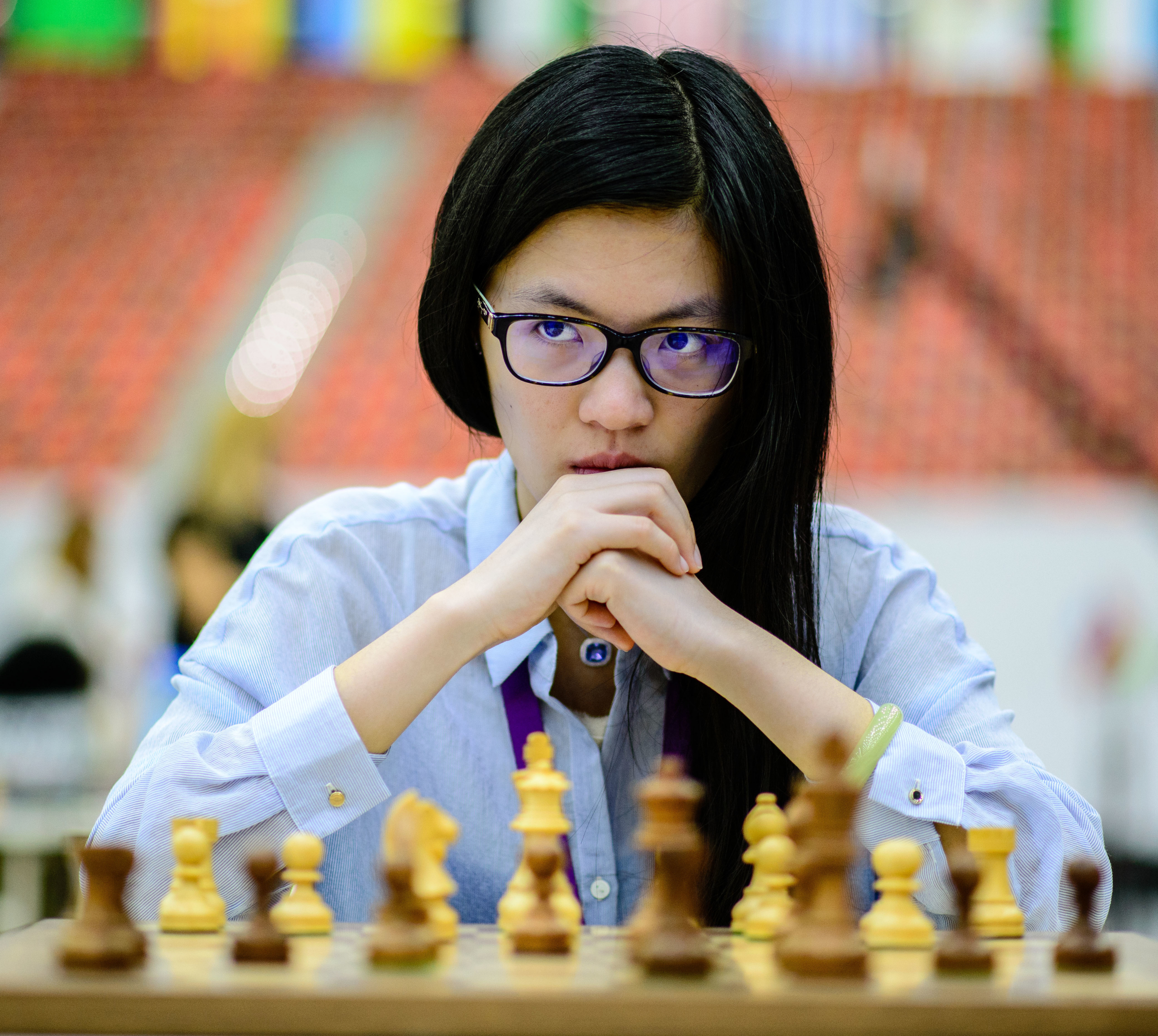
- Hou in 2016
- Born: 27 February 1994 (age 32); Xinghua, Jiangsu, China
- Education: Peking University (BLit); University of Oxford (MPP)
- Chess career
- Country: China
- Title: Grandmaster (2008)
- Women's World Champion: 2010–2012; 2013–2015; 2016–2017
- FIDE rating: 2596 (November 2026)
- Peak rating: 2686 (March 2015)
- Peak ranking: No. 55 (May 2015)

Chinese name
- Chinese: 侯逸凡
Transcriptions
Standard Mandarin
- Hanyu Pinyin: Hóu Yìfán
- Wade–Giles: Hou I-Fan
- IPA: [xǒʊ îfǎn]
Yue: Cantonese
- Yale Romanization: Haùh jaht fàahn
- Jyutping: Hau4 jat6 faan4
- IPA: [hɐ̏u jɐ̀t fȁːn]
Southern Min
- Hokkien POJ: Hâu E̍k-hōan

Hou Yifan (Chinese: 侯逸凡; pinyin: Hóu Yìfán; born 27 February 1994) is a Chinese chess grandmaster, four-time Women's World Chess Champion and professor at Peking University. She is the second-highest-rated female player of all time. A chess prodigy, she was the youngest female player ever to qualify for the title of grandmaster (at the age of 14 years, 6 months, 2 days) and the youngest ever to win the Women's World Chess Championship (at age 16).

At the age of 12, Hou became the youngest player ever to participate in the Women's World Championship (Yekaterinburg 2006) and the Chess Olympiad (Torino 2006). In June 2007, she became the youngest Chinese Women's Champion ever. She achieved the titles of Woman FIDE Master in January 2004, Woman Grandmaster in January 2007, and Grandmaster in August 2008. In 2010, she won the 2010 Women's World Championship in Hatay, Turkey at age 16. She won the next three championships in which the title was decided by a match (in 2011, 2013 and 2016, with a total of ten wins to zero losses and fourteen draws against three different opponents), but was either eliminated early or she declined to participate in the championships in which the title was decided by a knockout tournament (in 2012, 2015 and 2017).

Hou was the third woman ever to be rated among the world's top 100 players (2014–16 and 2017–22), after Maia Chiburdanidze and Judit Polgár. After Polgár's retirement, she was widely regarded as the strongest active female player, maintaining a substantial rating lead over her peers. She has been the No. 1 ranked woman in the world since September 2015, but has been largely inactive since 2018. She was named in the BBC's 100 Women programme in 2017. In 2020, she became the youngest professor at Shenzhen University at the age of 26, and has since moved to Peking University.

== Career ==
Hou started playing chess regularly at the age of five, but already was fascinated by the game when she was three years old. Hou's father, Hou Xuejian, a magistrate, often took her to a bookstore after dinner and noticed that she liked to stare at glass chess pieces behind the window. He later bought his daughter her first chess set and she was able to beat her father and grandmother after a few weeks, at the age of three. In 1999, her father engaged a chess mentor, IM Tong Yuanming, for his five-year-old daughter. Tong later said that Hou was an unusual talent, showing "strong confidence, distinguished memory, calculating ability and fast reaction". Hou has said that she took up chess because she was fascinated by the pieces.

Hou was admitted to the National Chess Center, an academy for young talented players from all over the country, in Beijing when she was ten, with leading Chinese grandmasters Ye Jiangchuan and Yu Shaoteng as her trainers. When Hou first played against Ye, the chief coach of the Chinese national men's and women's chess teams, he was surprised that the nine-year-old could identify almost all of his weak moves. "Then I knew she was an exceptional genius", Ye said. That year, Hou became the youngest member of the national team and won first place at the World Youth Championship for girls under age ten.

In order to better support her chess career, her family relocated to Beijing in 2003. Hou's mother, Wang Qian, a former nurse, accompanied her to many international tournaments when Hou was young. Hou was homeschooled. As a teenager, she listed her interests as reading and studying and she listed her favorite chess player as Bobby Fischer.

In 2005, at age eleven, she became the youngest chess player to earn a Woman Grandmaster norm; this record was not surpassed until 2025 with ten-year-old Bodhana Sivanandan. In June 2007, Yifan became China's youngest national champion. That same year, at twelve years and eleven months old, she became the youngest girl to defeat a grandmaster rated over 2600, by defeating Nikita Vitiugov, a record surpassed by Bodhana Sivanandan in 2026.

== Life outside chess ==
Against the wishes of her trainer, she enrolled in Peking University in 2012, studying International Relations. She took a full course load and participated in many extracurricular activities. She was offered a Rhodes Scholarship, and studied for a Master of Public Policy at St Hilda's College, Oxford with the Blavatnik School of Government. Commentators have noted her achievements despite her academic commitments and limited tournament preparation. Vladimir Kramnik said: "If she wants to stay the best female player, she can probably do nothing. If she wants to achieve her potential, she must concentrate fully on chess." She said in 2018: "I want to be the best, but you also have to have a life."

In 2020, at age 26, Hou became the youngest-ever professor at Shenzhen University where she is a professor at the School of Physical Education, which includes chess in its Sports Training Program.

== Results ==
=== 2003 ===
Hou Yifan's first major tournament was on 31 August–12 September 2003 at the Chinese Team Chess Championship (Open) in Tianjin. She scored 3/7 with a 2246 performance rating. She won her first international tournament when she came first (9½/11; +8 =3 −0, TPR 2121) in the girls' under-10 section of the World Youth Championship in Halkidiki, Greece in October–November 2003. In November, she made her debut in the National Women's Chess Championship, held at Shanwei, Guangdong. She finished in 14th place with 3½/9 with a performance rating of 2202.

=== 2004 ===
On 1 January 2004, she received her first International FIDE rating of 2168, which automatically qualified her for the title of Woman FIDE Master. In April, she competed at the Chinese Team Chess Championship (Women's) in Jinan, Shandong. She scored 1½/7 (TPR 2096) having faced an average opposition rating (R_{c}) of 2316.

In November, she finished first jointly with Yu Yangyi, Jules Moussard and Raymond Song, but third on tiebreaks in the boys' under-ten section of the World Youth Championship, held in Heraklio, Crete (9/11; +8 =2 −1; TPR 2119).

At the 11th Asian Women's Championship in Beirut, Lebanon from 4–11 December 2004, she came in eleventh with a score of 4½/9 (+4 =1 −4; TPR 2278). The event was won by Wang Yu with 6½/9.

=== 2005 ===
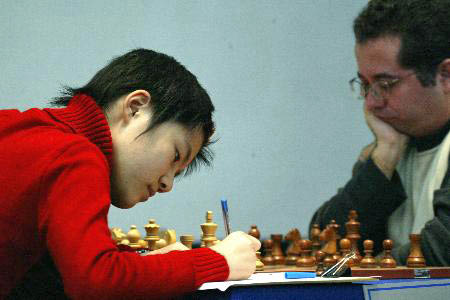
Hou Yifan at the 2005 World Team Chess Championship, Beersheva, Israel

In February, she competed at the fourth Aeroflot Open (Group C) in Moscow, where she scored 2/5 (TPR 2111).

In April, she finished fifth with a score of 7/11 (+6 =2 −3) (tied for fourth) at the Three Arrows Cup 2005 ladies' tournament in Jinan, China. In that tournament, she defeated international master Almira Skripchenko and achieved a performance rating of 2393.

From 28 June–6 July at the second China-France Youth Match at Shenzhen, Guangdong, Hou Yifan scored 3/8 (+2 =2 −4, TPR 2324). The Chinese team (Zhou Jianchao, Zhao Jun, Zhao Xue and Hou) won the match 19–13.

In July, at the Festival Open International des Jeunes in Saint-Lô, France, she came second out of 75 players with 6/8 (TPR 2305), behind Wen Yang. On 18–29 July at the World Youth Chess Championship in Belfort, France, Hou Yifan, seeded eighth, came in fifth in the Boys' Under-12 Section with 8/11 (+5 =6, TPR 2171).

In October, she qualified for the World Women's Chess Championship to be held in March 2006. Despite being rated only 2220 and ranked women's number 28 in her own country, she qualified by winning the Chinese Women's Zonal (3.5) tournament, scoring 6/9 points with a performance rating of 2526 against a rating opposition of 2401, ahead of several better-known Chinese players.

The sixth World Team Chess Championship was staged in Beersheva, Israel from 31 October to 11 November. China fielded two teams—the men's and women's, which was only the second time in the championship history when a women's team competed in what traditionally has been a male team event. This was Hou Yifan's first major team tournament and she was the youngest participant there, at eleven years of age. She played as second reserve and finished with 0/3. The Chinese women's team drew one match and lost all of their others (+0 =1 −7), finishing last. The tournament was won by Russia, with China (men's) coming in second and Armenia third.

In December, Hou came in second at the China Women Selective Tournament in Beijing for the 37th Chess Olympiad to be held in May–June 2006 in Turin, Italy. She scored 16½/28 (TPR 2433) and gained 121 elo-points. She made the Olympiad team with the other top finishers, Wang Yu and Shen Yang.

=== 2006 ===
Hou reached the third round (the last 16) of the Women's World Chess Championship in March 2006. Despite being rated 2269 and seeded 56th out of 64 players, she defeated IM Nadezhda Kosintseva (rated 2480) of Russia 1½–½ in the first round, then the former 2000 European champion WGM Natalia Zhukova (2432) of Ukraine 2–0 in the second round. She was beaten 0–2 by IM Nino Khurtsidze (2430) of Georgia in the third round to finish with a performance rating of 2504.

In May–June 2006, China came in third and won the bronze metal at the 37th Chess Olympiad in Turin, Italy. Hou Yifan scored 11/13 (+10, =2, −1), all played on the fourth board, at her Olympiad debut. For her winning percentage of 84.6%, she won a silver medal for fourth (reserve) board performance, and her performance rating of 2596 was the third highest overall.

The Chinese Championships for men and women took place in Wuxi, Jiangsu, 25 June–6 July 2006. Ni Hua took the men's title and Li Ruofan the women's. Hou Yifan came fourth in the women's category V (2369) event with a score of 7/11 (+5 =4 −2) and a performance rating of 2477.

In July–August, she performed badly at what has been traditionally the strongest women's tournament, the North Urals Cup in Krasnoturinsk, Russia. Although seeded third, she failed to win a game scoring 3/9 (+0 =6 −3) with a performance rating of 2357. She finished eighth out of ten players.

In 10–20 August, she played in the China–Russia Summit Match in Ergun, Inner Mongolia. The tournament was a two double-round-robin Scheveningen, one for men and one for women (category VIII (2444)). Russia won the men's event 26½–23½ but China won the women's section 28–22, winning the match 51½–48½. Hou Yifan was the highest-scoring female player on tiebreak with 6½/10 (+5 =3 −2, TPR 2563).

China and France played for the Trophée MULTICOMS in Paris 4–9 September 2006. This was also a Scheveningen team match with six men and three women in the teams. France edged out China 20–16 in the men's event. The women's section was a complete mismatch in terms of Elo ratings in favour of the Chinese and they confirmed this over the board winning 12½–5½. The overall result was China 28½ France 25½. Hou Yifan was again the highest-scoring female player with 5/6 and a performance rating of 2498.

In October in Yerevan, Armenia at the World Junior Chess Championship (Girls' section) despite being only 12 years old, Hou was the top-rated girl with a 2481 FIDE Rating and went on to take second place on tiebreak with a score of 9/12 (+6 =4 −2), tied for first on points behind her compatriot Shen Yang. Her rating performance was 2469.

=== 2007 ===
In January 2007, Hou achieved a respectable fifth place in Group C (Cat. 10, 2486) of the Corus Chess Tournament with a score of 7/13 (+4 =6 −3) and a 2513 performance rating. This result, together with WGM norms she had earned at the 2005 Zonal 3.5 Women's Championship, the 37th Chess Olympiad and the 2006 Chinese Championship (Women's) won her the Woman Grandmaster title, formally conferred by FIDE in late January 2007.

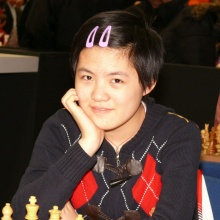
Hou Yifan at the 2007 Corus Chess Tournament

At the Aeroflot Open in February 2007, a few weeks before Hou's thirteenth birthday, she played in the A1 group for the first time. Hou started well with two wins out of two, defeating first the Russian IM Nikita Vitiugov (rated 2604) and then the 2001 European Champion, GM Emil Sutovsky of Israel (rated 2629). However, in the third round she was defeated by the Russian Championship runner-up, Dmitry Jakovenko, and only managed one draw in her next five games. She rallied in the final round with a victory against the Greek grandmaster, Vasilios Kotronias, and finished with a score of 3½/9 (TPR 2540).

In March, at the first Ruy Lopez International Festival (cat. XV (2607)) in Zafra, Hou performed badly to finish last with 2/7 (+1 =2 −4). Her performance rating was 2462.

In April, she came in second at the China Women Selective Tournament in Ningbo for the 2007 Asian Indoor Games to be held in October. She scored 8/14 (+6 =4 −4, TPR 2434).

From 1–11 May 2007, at the eighth Russian Team Chess Championship (Women's) in Dagomys, Hou played for Southern Ural Chelyabinsk on board one and scored 6½/10 (+5 =3 −2, TPR 2523). At the 1st World Women's Team Chess Championship in Ekaterinburg later that month, Hou was part of the winning China national team that also included Zhao Xue, Ruan Lufei, Shen Yang and Huang Qian. Hou Yifan played on board two in every round and scored 7½/9 (+7 =1 −1), winning the gold medal for that board. Her performance rating was 2559.

In June 2007, she won her first Chinese Women's Chess Championship in Chongqing. Hou was thirteen years old at the time, breaking WGM Qin Kanying's record as the youngest champion (she was fourteen years old when winning the title in 1988). Hou scored 9/11 (+7 =4 -0, TPR 2585). Second and third places went to Zhao Xue and Shen Yang, respectively.

In July, she improved on her previous year's performance at the North Urals Cup in Krasnoturinsk, finishing in seventh place out of ten players. She scored 4/9 (+3 =2 −4) with a performance rating of 2436. The tournament was won by Zhu Chen and with Zhao Xue in second place.

In 4–15 August, she competed in what was then her strongest closed tournament—the fifth Győrgy Marx Memorial (Cat. 14, 2582) in Paks, Hungary. Being the lowest-rated player and the only non-Grandmaster (out of Pentala Harikrishna, Péter Ács, Csaba Balogh, Ferenc Berkes and Viktor Korchnoi), she finished in last place in the double round-robin event with 3/10 (+1 =4 −5; TPR 2444).

At the UK-China Match in Liverpool 3–9 September 2007, China defeated the UK team with a comfortable score of 28–20. Hou played for the men's team and scored 2½/6 (+1 =3 −2) with a performance rating of 2540. The average rating of her opponents (R_{c}) was 2598.

In late September, she came in first at the 2007 Chinese Women's Zonal (3.5) tournament in Tianjin with a score of 8/9 (+7 =2 −0, TPR 2675). In October 2007, she competed at the twelfth European Club Cup in Kemer, Turkey for team Southern Ural Cheliabinsk. Hou played on board two for the team, which finished fourth in the women's tournament. In the individual women's standings, Hou came in fifth with a score of 5/7 (+3 =4 −0) and a performance rating of 2556.

From 26 October to 3 November, she competed for Team China at the second Asian Indoor Games in Macau. The national team won team gold in the classic chess mixed team event with 11 match points (18½ game points out of 24). The Chinese team members were Zhao Xue, Xu Yuhua, Hou Yifan, Wang Hao, Ni Hua and Bu Xiangzhi. Hou Yifan won an individual gold medal for her board two display with a score of 5½/6 (+5 =1 −0; 91.7%) and a performance rating of 2649.

Hou participated in the 2007 season of the China Chess League, officially known as the "Torch Real Estate Cup Chinese Chess League Division A". She played for the Shandong Qilu Evening News Chess Team, who became the 2007 champions when they defeated the 2006 champion Beijing team, 3½ to 1½.

=== 2008 ===
In the January Corus 2008 chess tournament in Wijk aan Zee, Hou competed in Group B where she finished in a tie for seventh–tenth place (ninth by tiebreak) achieving 6/13 (+3 −4 =6) with a performance rating of 2598. She scored victories over three grandmasters, including a 23-move win over former World Champion challenger Nigel Short.

In February 2008, Hou gained her first Grandmaster norm (GM norm) at the Aeroflot Open in Moscow by finishing in 31st place with a score of 4½/9 (+2 =5 −2, TPR 2605). This was followed in March 2008 with a victory at the first Atatürk International Women Masters Chess Tournament (cat. IX (2461)) in Istanbul, Turkey where she finished a point ahead of the rest of the field on 7/9 (+5 =4 −0) with a performance rating of 2674. Her victory in this tournament earned her a GM norm conditional on FIDE ratifying then WGM Zhao Xue's attainment of her GM title. However, this GM norm was not used in her eventual official grandmaster title application.

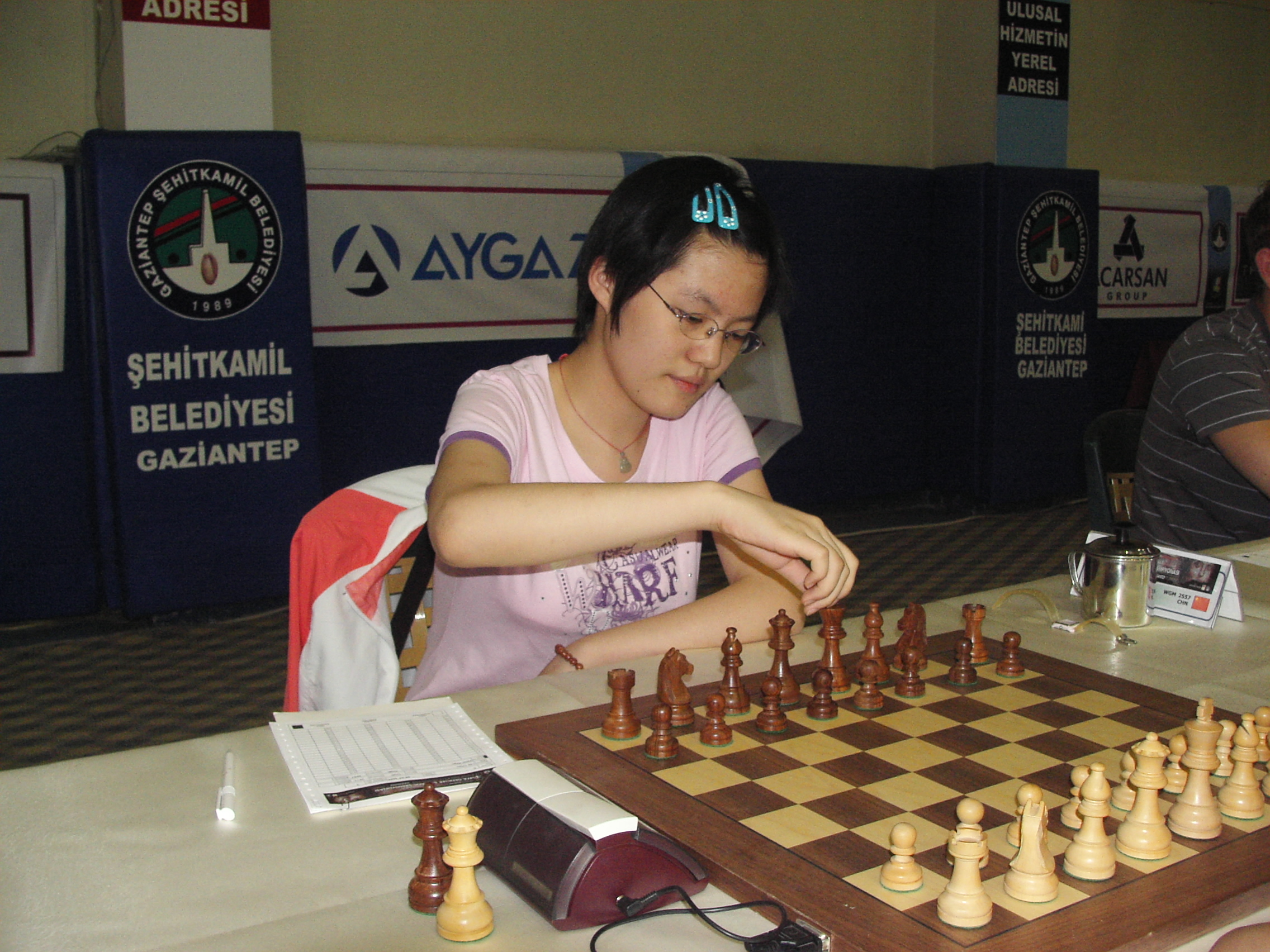
Hou Yifan at the 2008 World Junior Chess Championship, Gaziantep, Turkey where she gained a GM norm

In April 2008, she competed in Mérida, Spain at the second Ruy Lopez Chess Festival tournament. In the category XV (2616) round-robin event she finished seventh out of eight players with 2/7 (+1, =2, −4) and a rating performance of 2467.

Hou competed in the Chinese Chess League again in the 2008 season, which had eighteen rounds in six different cities from March to August. Hou's teammates were GM Bu Xiangzhi, GM Zhao Jun, GM Wen Yang and WGM Zhang Jilin.

In May–June 2008, she became the Chinese Women's Champion for the second consecutive time with 9/11 points (+7 =4 −0) in Beijing and a performance of 2599. At the July 2008 First Saturday GM Tournament in Budapest, Hou was top seed, but came in second place with 9/12, missing a GM norm by half a point. Her performance rating was 2574.

In August 2008 she competed in the World Junior Chess Championship held at Gaziantep, Turkey where she competed in the general ("boys'") section for the first time in her career. She was the only girl in this section and was the sixteenth seed on the entrant's list. Hou finished joint third–seventh on 9/13 (+6 =6 −1), achieving a performance rating of 2661 and her second GM norm.

In August–September 2008, she competed in her second Women's World Chess Championship at Nalchik, Russia. She had qualified by being one of the six highest-rated players from the average of the July 2006–January 2007 period. In this knockout tournament, she was seeded third out of 64 players. She defeated WGM Mona Khaled (Egypt) 2–0 in the first round and WGM Batkhuyagiin Möngöntuul (Mongolia), 2–0 in the second. In third round, she had to go to rapid playoffs to eventually beat IM Elena Sedina (Italy) 3–1 (1–1, 2–0). In the quarterfinals she defeated Armenian IM Lilit Mkrtchian 1½–½, followed by Indian GM Humpy Koneru, the second seed, in the semifinals (4–2 overall, 1–1, 1–1, 2–0). She lost the final to Alexandra Kosteniuk of Russia, 2½–1½. Nonetheless, she became the youngest ever finalist for the Women's World Championship title, earning an automatic International Master (IM) title and a "runner-up 9-game grandmaster norm", her third official GM norm overall. Her performance rating for the entire championship was 2536.

Hou participated at the first World Mind Sports Games in Beijing from 3–18 October as a member of the Chinese team, winning the bronze medal in the Women's Individual Blitz event, the gold medal in the Mixed Pairs Rapid event (with Ni Hua), the silver medal in the Women's Teams Blitz event, and the gold medal in the Women's Teams Rapid event. In mid-late October, playing board one for team Spartak Vidnoe in the thirteenth European Club Cup held in Kallithea, Greece she scored 2/4 (+1 −1 =2, TPR 2448) helping her team to a second-place finish. Very shortly thereafter she played in the Cap d'Agde Rapid tournament from 24 October to 1 November, losing to former world champion Anatoly Karpov in a tiebreaker match at the end of the qualifying stage, despite winning the second tiebreak game.

At the 38th Chess Olympiad in Dresden from 12 to 25 November, she played at the number 1 board in the Chinese women's team. Although her team did not win a prize, she still placed third in the individual board prize. She played in every round with a final result of 7½/11 (+5, =5, −1, TPR 2563).

At the 79th FIDE Congress, held on 16–26 November 2008 in Dresden, Germany, her GM title was approved, making her the 27th Chinese Grandmaster. Her three approved GM norms were:

- Aeroflot Open Tournament A1 in Moscow, February 2008; score 4½/9 (requirement=4½ points)
- World Junior Chess Championship 2008 in Gaziantep, August 2008; score 9/13 (requirement=8 points)
- Women's World Chess Championship 2008 in Nalchik, September 2008; reached the finals (equivalent to a 9-game GM norm)

This meant that Hou Yifan reached her third grandmaster norm on 12 September 2008 at the age of 14 years, 6 months, 2 days, making her one of the youngest grandmasters in history, as well as the youngest female.

=== 2009 ===
Hou Yifan competed in the Grandmaster Group B of the 71st Corus chess tournament in Wijk aan Zee from 16 January to 1 February 2009. She was seeded twelfth out of fourteen players and finished joint ninth–tenth with a performance rating of 2620. Between 7–19 March, she finished third in the FIDE Women's Grand Prix Tournament in Istanbul, scoring 8/11 (+6=4–1, TPR 2649).

From 12 to 23 May, she competed at the 8th Asia Continental Chess Championship at the Subic Exhibition and Convention Center, Subic Bay Freeport Zone in Olongapo City, Philippines. She scored 7½/11 with a 2640 performance, finishing seventh out of 86 on tiebreak. By finishing in the top ten she qualified for the 2009 World Cup.

From 9–15 August 2009 at the Jubilee Open, Zürich, she won the "best female player" prize by coming joint seventeenth with 6½/9 (+5 −1 =3, TPR 2590). From 19 August to 1 September at the NH Hotels Risings Stars vs Experienced, Amsterdam, she finished with a score of 3½/10 (+1 −4 =5, TPR 2548). She was defeated in the first round at the Chess World Cup 2009, Khanty-Mansiysk, Russia, 20 November – 15 December 2009.

=== 2010 ===
In January, she finished with 4½/9 at the Moscow Open. In February, she finished with 4/9 at the Aeroflot Open. In April, she won the third Kuala Lumpur Open 7.5/9 (+6 = 2, TPR 2730). In August, she won the 2010 Women's Grand Prix in Mongolia.

In October, she was on board two for Cercle d'Echecs de Monte Carlo in the 15th European Club Cup for Women held in Plovdiv, Bulgaria. She helped her team to a gold medal win with a 4.5/6 score (+3 =3, TPR 2651).

In November, she won the women's individual gold medal in the 16th Asian Games in Guangzhou, China. She finished with 8½/9 and with a performance rating of 2798. She won another gold medal from the women's team event, representing China as the first board, along with her teammates Ju Wenjun, Zhao Xue, Huang Qian and Wang Yu, beating Uzbekistan 2½–1½ in the final.

In December she won the Women's World Chess Championship 2010 in Hatay, Turkey, making her the youngest women's world champion in history. Her compatriot Ruan Lufei was her opponent in the finals. After four games at classical time controls, the score was tied at 2–2, but Hou won the rapid playoffs 3–1 to take the title. Her performance rating was 2585.

=== 2011 ===
In January 2011 she was due to take part in the Gibraltar Chess Festival, but pulled out because of a family illness. In April, she won the First Women Master Tournament in Wuxi with a 7/9 score (+6 −1 =2, TPR 2639).

In June, she took part in a tournament in India, the AAI International Grandmasters Chess Tournament 2011. She finished with a dismal last place, but in August, she rebounded to win clear first place in the FIDE Women's Grand Prix 2011–2012 tournament in Rostov, Russia. She then went on to win the second Grand Prix stage in Shenzhen in September 2011.

In August, she took part in the Chess World Cup 2011 in Khanty-Mansiysk, Russia. She was one of the two female participants in the 128-player single-elimination tournament. Her opponent for the first round was Sergei Movsesian, to whom she lost 2–0, resulting in her elimination.

In October she played on board one for team Cercle d'Echecs de Monte-Carlo in the 16th European Club Cup for women held in Rogaska Slatina, Slovenia. Her top-rated team placed a disappointing 4th place, with Hou scoring 4/6 (+4 −2, TPR 2526)

In November Hou successfully defended her women's world champion title in the Women's World Chess Championship 2011 in Tirana, Albania against Koneru Humpy. Hou won 3 games and drew 5 in the ten-game match, winning the title with two games to spare. Her performance rating for the match was 2741.

Beginning December, Hou played in the 2011 SportAccord World Mind Games, held in Beijing, China, which consisted of 3 events: rapid, blitz, and blindfold. She placed joined 5–7th, 6th on tiebreaks with a 4/7 score (+2 −1 =4) in the rapid portion, but winning both the blitz and the blindfold portions with 11.5/15 (+9 −1 = 5) and 5.5/7 (+5 −1 =1) scores, respectively.

Afterwards, Hou played for China in the Women's World Chess Team Championship in Mardin, Turkey. The 5 person team, arranged according to rating, consisted of herself, WGM Ju Wenjun, GM Zhao Xue, WGM Tan Zhongyi and WGM Zhang Xiaowen. China was the clear winner with 16 match points, having lost but one match to Ukraine in the 8th round and winning the rest, ahead of the runner-up Russia by three match points. Georgia grabbed bronze with 12 match points. Hou scored five points from the seven games she played (Wenjun played the first board for Round 1 and Round 2) (+3 = 4, TPR 2648).

=== 2012 ===
Hou started 2012 by taking equal first place at Tradewise alongside Nigel Short at the Gibraltar Chess Festival scoring 8/10 (+7 −1 =2) with a tournament performance of 2872. She came second on tiebreak when she lost the two-game blitz playoff against Short by 1.5–0.5. She scored 5/7 against the 7 GMs she played rated 2700 or higher. This included 4 wins against Zoltán Almási (2717), Judit Polgár (2710) (Polgar's first loss against a female player after 22 years), Lê Quang Liêm (2714) and Alexei Shirov (2710), 2 draws against Michael Adams (2724) and Shakhriyar Mamedyarov (2747), whilst her only loss came against Krishnan Sasikiran (2700) in a close endgame of Q (with a pawn up) versus R+R with black.

From 6 to 13 March, she played and finished joint 2nd–8th in the 2012 Reykjavik Open 7/9 (+5 =4, TPR 2677). From 27 March to 7 April, she participated in the 2012 China Chess Individual Tournament Group A, the determiner of China's National Champion. She finished joint 7th–9th, 7th by tiebreak. 5/11 (+1 −2 =8; TPR 2560).

From 13 April to 19 April, Hou played in the 2012 Bangkok Chess Club open. Seeded third by rating, she finished 14th, 6/9 (+4 −1 = 4; TPR 2500).

From 29 May to 7 June, she played in the 3rd Hainan Danzhou Grand Master Chess Tournament that traditionally showcased the top 10 highest-rated Chinese players, although the two highest-rated players at the time Wang Hao and Li Chao did not participate. Seeded 6th by rating, Hou finished in 10th and last place with 3/9.

From 9 to 22 June, Hou played in the 4th leg of the FIDE Women's Grand Prix 2011–2012 held in Kazan, Russia. Coming immediately off the heels of the recently completed Chinese Men's super tournament in Danzhou, she started off slowly with two points in the first five rounds before closing strongly with four wins in the final six rounds. She finished joint 3rd–4th. 7/11 (+5 −2 = 4; TPR 2604).

From 16 to 19 July, Hou played in the 5th leg of the FIDE Women's Grand Prix 2011–2012 held in Jermuk, Armenia. She won the event with a 7/11 score (+4 −1 =6, TPR 2598). This victory added to her victories in Rostov 2011 and Shenzeng 2011 made Hou the winner of the FIDE Women's Grand Prix 2011–2012 and secured for herself the challenger spot for the Women's World Chess Championship 2013.

At the 40th Chess Olympiad held in Istanbul, Turkey from 27 August to 10 September 2012, Hou Yifan led the Chinese women's chess team to a second-place, silver medal finish. Hou won the gold medal for individual performance on board 1 with a 2645 TPR, 6.5/9 score (+4, =5). During the competition she was presented with the Caissa Cup, which honors the female player with the best chess results during the year.

From 8 October to 17 October, Hou played in the European Chess Club Cup 2012 as a member of team, Cercle d'Echecs de Monte-Carlo. She played board 1 with 4.5/6 score (+4 −1 =1, TPR 2609) and her heavily favored team swept the round-robin competition with a 7–0 score.

From 19 October to 27 October, Hou played in the main even of 16th Univé Hoogeveen Chess Festival as part of the Univé Crown Group, a four-player double round-robin tournament. The average rating of the participants was 2695, making this a category 18 tournament. Hou finished in last place with a 2/6 score (−2 =4, TPR 2605).

In an interview in Kazan she said that she was going to start studying international relations at Beijing University in September. She said that she was glad China was moving away from its one-child policy, she would have liked to have had a brother or sister, and she knew of women who had been forced to have abortions.

In November 2012 she was knocked out in the second round of the Women's World Chess Championship 2012. As the winner of FIDE Women's Grand Prix 2011–2012 she earned the right to challenge the new champion in the Women's World Chess Championship 2013.

During 12 to 19 December, Hou concluded the year by participating in the 2012 SportAccord World Mind Games, competing in the 3 disciplines of Rapid, Blitz and Blindfold. In the rapid event, she placed second on tiebreaks with a 5/7 score (+4 −1 =2, TPR 2713). For the blitz event, she placed 7th by tiebreaks with a 7/15 score (+6 −7 =2, TPR 2487). In the blindfold event, she won with a 6/7 score (+6 −1).

=== 2013 ===
Hou was invited to participate in the 2013 Tata Steel Chess Tournament Grandmaster A group in Wijk aan Zee from 12 to 27 January. This was a Category 20 event, and her first supertournament participation. She was the lowest Elo-rated player at 2603 and seeded 14th. She surpassed initial expectations by finishing 11/14 with a 5.5/13 score (+3 −5 =5, TPR 2688) including a draw against then World Champion Viswanathan Anand. She competed in the 2013 China Chess Individual Tournament Group A in Xinghua, China from 16 to 27 April. She finished in a six-way tie for 4th to 9th place, 4th by tie breaks, with a 5.5/11 score (+3 −3 =5, TPR 2609).

From 2 May to 16 May, Hou competed in the 1st leg of the FIDE Women's Grand Prix 2013–2014 held in Geneva, Switzerland. She was the highest-rated player in the event but finished 8th/9th, including a loss to the Women's World Champion 2012–13, Anna Ushenina. Her score was 5/11 (+3 −4 = 4, TPR 2470).

From 11 to 14 June, she played a four-game match with David Navara for the CEZ Chess Trophy 2013. All four games ended in draws, so the winner would be decided by tie breaks. After each player won with white in the blitz portion, an armageddon game won by Hou, as black, gave her the trophy. Her performance rating for the classical games was 2707.

From 30 June to 3 July, Hou was part of the team representing China in the 4th Asian Martial Arts Games held in Incheon, South Korea. She won a gold medal in the classical portion of the event with a 6.5/7 score (+6 =1). In August, she took part in the Chess World Cup 2013 in Tromsø, Norway. She was one of four female participants in the 128-player single-elimination tournament. Her opponent for the first round was Alexei Shirov. After two draws in the classical portion of the match, they proceeded to tiebreaks. Hou won the first rapid game with white and lost the second with black. In the next tiebreaker set she lost both games resulting in her elimination.

As the winner of the FIDE Women's Grand Prix 2011–2012, Hou won the right to challenge Anna Ushenina in a 10-game match for the world title. Scheduled from 10 to 27 September, the Women's World Chess Championship 2013 was played in Taizhou, Jiangsu, China. She won the match in 7 games with a 5.5–1.5 score (+4 =3, TPR 2730) regaining her championship title.

From 19 to 26 October, Hou played in the European Chess Club Cup 2013 as a member of team, Cercle d'Echecs de Monte-Carlo. She played board 1 with 5/6 score (+4 =2, TPR 2736) and for the second year in a row, her team swept the round robin competition with a 7–0 score. From 12 to 18 December, she played in the SportAccord World Mind Games in the chess discipline. The tournament consisted of three events: rapid, blitz and the basque system. In the rapid event, Hou scored 5/7 (+3 = 4, TPR 2691) capturing the silver medal. In the blitz event, she won the gold medal with a 21.5/30 score (+19 −6 =5, ). Notable was that during the second day of the blitz event, Hou achieved a near perfect 9.5/10 score. In the final event played under the basque system, Hou won the silver medal on tiebreaks with a 7/10 score (+7 −3).

=== 2014 ===
From 11 to 22 March, Hou competed in the 2014 China Chess Individual Tournament Group A in Xinghua, her birthplace. She again played against the men in the open section rather than in the women's section. She finished in 7th place with a 5.5/11 score (+2 −3 =6, TPR 2558).

From 14 July to 24 July, Hou played in the grandmaster section of the prestigious Biel chess tournament. This was a six player category 19 event with an average rating of 2717 with Hou being the lowest-rated player. She started with a win over Anish Giri and was tied for second entering the final round and could take joint first place by winning her final game against Pendyala Harikrishna. While she wound up losing the final game, Hou still had a successful tournament, finishing joint 3rd–5th with a 5/10 score (+2 −2 =6, TPR 2734).

From 1 August to 14 August, Hou participated in 41st Chess Olympiad in Tromsø, Norway as board one of the top seeded Chinese Women's team. The team rattled off six straight wins before succumbing to the second seeded Russian team with Hou losing her individual game, as black, to Kateryna Lagno. She ended the Olympiad with a 7/9 score (+6 −1 = 2, TPR 2671) leading her team to the silver medal. Her own performance was good enough to receive the silver medal for board one.

Hou is the winner of FIDE Women's Grand Prix 2013–14. From 8 April to 22 April, she played in the 4th stage in Khanty-Mansiysk, Russia. Opening with 3 straight victories, she dominated from start to finish. Several times as white she eschewed her regular 1.e4 opening move and began with 1.c4 and 1.g3. She finished in 1st place with an 8.5/11 score (+6 =5, TPR 2695). From 18 June to 2 July, she played in the 5th stage in Lopota, Georgia. Leading from start to finish, she won with a 9/11 score (+7 = 4, TPR 2773), a full two points over her nearest competitors. From 24 August to 6 September, she competed in the 6th and final stage in Sharjah, United Arab Emirates. She finished joint first with Ju Wenjun with an 8.5/11 score (+6 =5, TPR 2686).

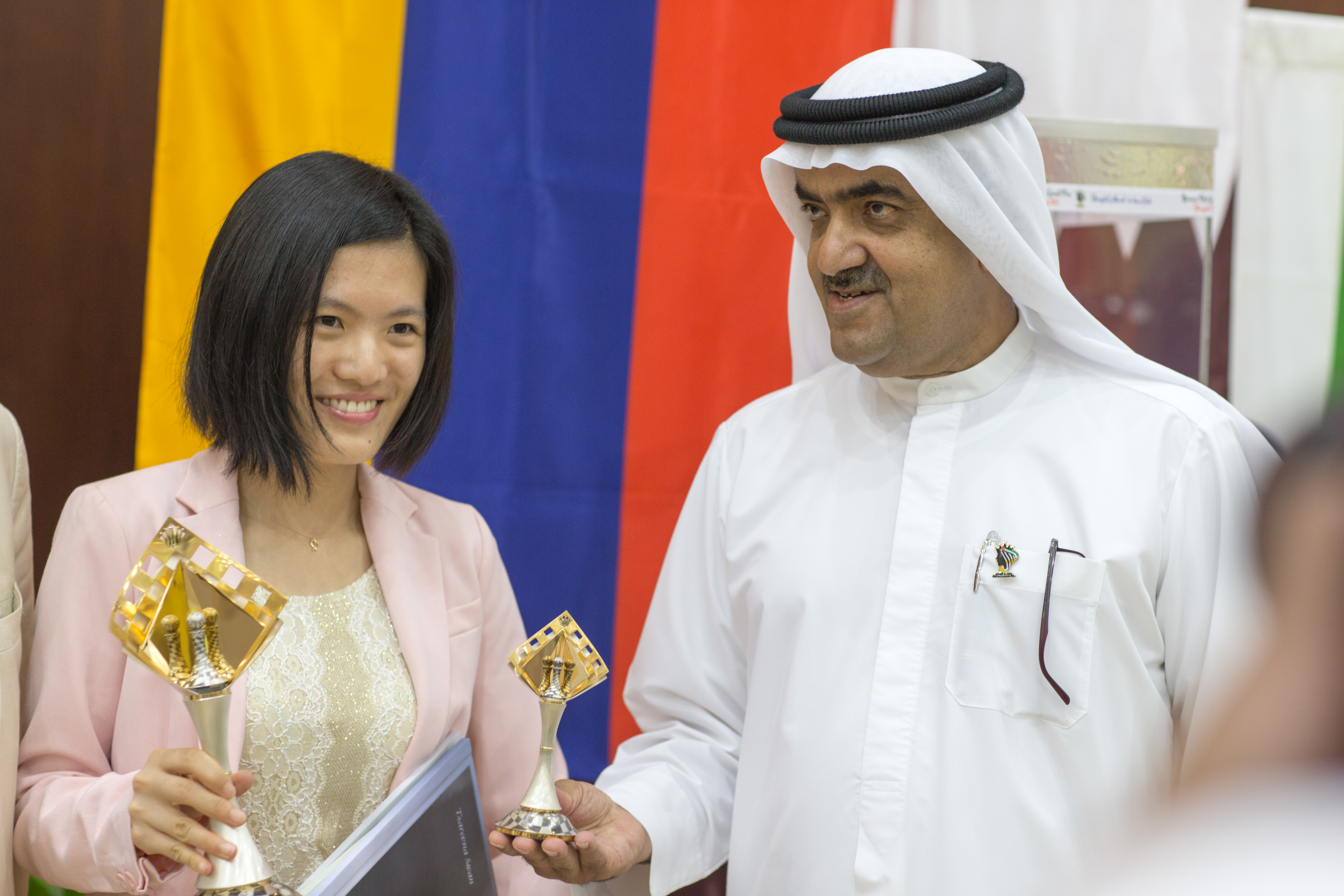
Grand Prix Cup award ceremony, Sharjah, UAE

At the final leg, the tournament's official awards, Big and Small Cups of Grand Prix, designed and manufactured by the Lobortas Classic Jewelry House, were presented. As the winner of the 2013–2014 Grand Prix Series, Hou Yifan was solemnly awarded the Small Cup during the official closing ceremony of the tournament.

During 13 to 21 September, she competed at the 18th European Club Cup held in Bilbao, Spain. Once again she was the top board for Cercle d'Echecs de Monte-Carlo winning the individual gold medal for her performance 5/6 (+4 =2, TPR 2749) while leading her team to a second-place finish.

With the postponement of the Women's World Chess Championship 2014 she played in the Corsican Chess Circuit in October and won, beating Sergey Fedorchuk in the final. According to Albert Silver from Chessbase magazine this was one of the most significant open tournaments won by a female player other than Judit Polgár.

From 11 to 18 December, Hou played in the 2014 SportAccord World Mind Games held in Beijing, China. The Mind Games consists of separate tournaments in 3 disciplines: rapid, blitz and basque. In the rapid event, she placed second capturing the silver medal, losing only to Valentina Gunina, the eventual event winner. Her performance was 5/7 (+4 −1 = 3, rapid TPR 2672). She won the gold medal in the blitz event with a 22.5/30 score (+20 −5 = 5, TPR 2718). Especially noteworthy in her blitz tournament was her performance pushed her official blitz rating to 2704, making her the second female player to cross the 2700 barrier in any rating format. In the final basque system event, Hou took home another gold medal with an 8.5/10 score (+7 =3).

When Hou turned twenty one in 2015 she lost her junior status. She ended the year, and her junior playing career, as the reigning Women's World Chess Champion, the second-highest-rated female player, the highest-rated girl, the fourth-highest-rated junior and the 71st-highest-overall-rated active player with a FIDE rating of 2673.

=== 2015 ===
Hou once again played in the 2015 edition of Tata Steel Chess Tournament held from 15 to 25 January. She was the 12th seed out of 14 total participants in the Category 20 Master group and finished 11th with a 5/13 score(+1 −4 = 8, TPR 2670). While she performed approximately according to her rating, Hou had winning chances in a few of her games and even missed a drawing chance against world champion Magnus Carlsen after defending a difficult position as black for most of the game.

Shortly after, she returned to the scene of her greatest chess tournament triumph, the Gibraltar Chess Festival 2015 held from 27 January to 4 February. Seeded 13th by rating, she placed joint 3rd–11th, 3rd by performance with a 7.5/10 score (+5 =5, TPR 2772) pushing her FIDE rating to 2686. She also won the first-place prize for being the highest-scoring female player. Her excellent performance in this event resulted in her rating surpassing Judit Polgár's classic rating for the first time in the March 2015 FIDE rating list, ending Polgár's 26 consecutive years reign as the top-rated female player in the world. For the first time since Maia Chiburdanidze in January 1989 a single individual was both the top-rated woman player and the reigning Women's World Chess Champion.

She played in the Hawaii Grandmaster Challenge 2015 in March, a two-day four player quadruple blitz and rapid round robin event. She began the first day with a 3.5/6 score before crushing her opponents the second day with five straight wins and a draw in the final game easily winning the event with a 9/12 score. Since this event conflicted with the Women's World Chess Championship 2015 she relinquished her title to Mariya Muzychuk at the conclusion of the Championship.

Hou played in the Nakhchivan Open 2015 in from 1 to 11 May. Seeded 3rd by rating, she finished in a nine-way tie for joint 4th–12th with a 6/9 score (+5 −2 =2, TPR 2581).

She played in the 2015 edition of Dortmund Sparkassen Chess Meeting which ran from 27 June to 5 July. With an average rating of 2724, it qualified as a Category 20 supertournament. Hou finished in joint 7th/8th with a 2.5/7 score (−2 =5, TPR 2629)

Hou has been chosen as the first FIDE Presidential nominee for Chess World Cup 2015 held in Baku from 10 September to 5 October. She made it past the first round of a World Cup for the first time in her career before losing in the second round 1.5–2.5 to Shakhriyar Mamedyarov after the 1st set of rapid tiebreaks. Her performance rating was 2685 for the event.

From 2 October to 15 October, Hou competed in the 1st leg of the FIDE Women's Grand Prix 2015–16 held in Monte Carlo, Monaco. She started the event slowly, with a 2.5/4 score going into the first rest day. This included a loss to rival Humpy Koneru before stringing together a streak of six wins, winning the tournament with one round to spare. Her final score was 9/11 (+8 −1 = 2, TPR 2766).

She participated in an exhibition match against Parimarjan Negi held in the Chess Club and Scholastic Center of Saint Louis from 12 to 15 November. The four-day event showcased a different chess variant each day: Basque Chess, Rapid Chess960, Rapid Chess and Blitz Chess with each game played counting for 1 point in determining the winner. Hou easily won the match: 0–2 in Basque, 3.5–0.5 in Chess960, 3–1 in Rapid Chess and 4.5–3.5 in Blitz with a total score of 11–7.

As part of the joint Russian-Chinese Match of Friendship chess festival held from 13 to 15 December held in Shanghai, China, Hou participated in an exhibition match with the GM Evgeniy Najer the 2015 European Champion. Playing a series of rapid and blitz games, she won quite convincingly with a 9.5 to 4.5 score.

In the last chess event of the year, the 2nd edition of the 2015 Qatar Masters Open held from 19 to 30 December in Doha, Qatar, Hou was the 22nd-highest-rated player in the tournament but finished in 38th place with a 5.5/9 score (+3 −1 =5, TPR 2591). The result was still good enough to win the top women's prize by a full point.

=== 2016 ===
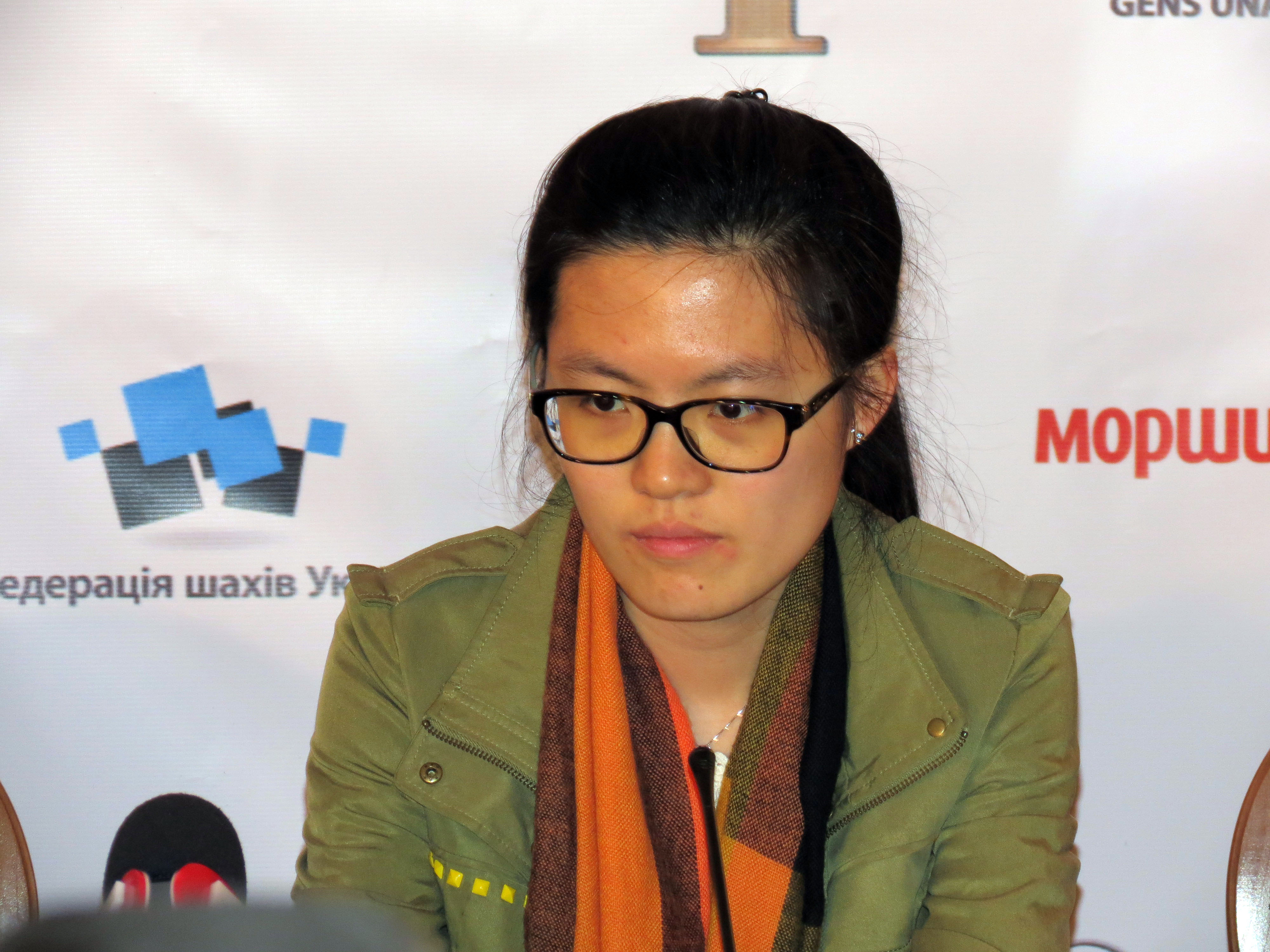
Hou at the Women's World Chess Championship 2016

For the third time, Hou competed in the top group of the Tata Steel Chess Tournament held from 15 to 31 January. This year she was seeded 13th out of 14 participants in this Category 20 event. She started strongly, going +1 in her first six games before faltering with four losses in the following five games. She placed 12th with a 5/13 score(+1 −4 = 8, TPR 2672).

In early February, Hou played and won in a four-game match against Cristobal Henriquez Villagra in Punta Arenas. Billed as a Bicontinental Chess Match, it was scheduled to be played in two locations, but due to inclement weather, they were unable to play in Antarctica. She won the match with a 2.5–1.5 score(+2 −1 =1, TPR 2584).

Qualifying for the Women's World Chess Championship 2016, in March, as the winner of the FIDE Women's Grand Prix 2013–14, she reclaimed the World Championship title from Mariya Muzychuk in Lviv, Ukraine with a 6–3 score (+3 =6, TPR 2685).

From 23–26 March Hou played in a four player 3 round classical/3 round rapid robin tournament to determine the qualifier for the 4th edition of Norway Chess. She finished in 3rd place with a 1/3 score (−1 =2, TPR 2531) in the classical portion and 2/1 score (+2 −1, TPR 2716) in the rapid portion.

In May, Hou dropped out of the current Women's World Championship cycle, effectively relinquishing the crown. She explained her reasons in a Chessbase interview, mainly objecting to the format wherein the Women's World Champion is decided alternately by a knockout tournament and then a match. She also expressed her willingness to participate in the cycle if the format were amended to mirror that of the World Chess Championship.

She played in the Vugar Gashimov Memorial, a category 20 tournament held in, Shamkir Azerbaijan, from 26 May to 4 June. She was the ninth seed out of ten participants and finished in last place with a 2.5/10 score (−4 = 5, TPR 2578)

Hou played in the Eurasian Blitz Cup from 17–20 June in Almaty, Kazakhstan. Seeded 17th on the strength of her 2704 blitz rating, she came in 29th place with a 12.5/22 score (+10 −7 = 5, TPR 2650). Among the female competitors, while having a superior performance rating, she came in second to Harika Dronavalli on tiebreaks.

=== 2017 ===
At the Tradewise Gibraltar Chess Festival, Hou finished with a score of 6/10 (the tournament was won by Hikaru Nakamura). Her round 7 win against the French master Borya Ider, in which she made an early positional sacrifice of queen for two minor pieces, was described as "truly astonishing" by organizer and chess journalist John Saunders. In the final round, she appeared to throw her game against Indian Grandmaster Lalith Babu, playing a ridiculous opening and resigning after five moves. She later explained that she was upset about being paired against other female players in 7 of her 9 previous games of a Swiss system tournament, despite men far outnumbering women at the tournament. However, tournament organizer Brian Callaghan said the pairings were simply the result of a computer program.

Hou Yifan was one of 24 players selected to play in the FIDE Grand Prix 2017, a qualification stage for the World Chess Championship 2018. She reached position 17 in the final standings, and thus was not able to qualify for the Championship.

She declined to defend her title at the Women's World Chess Championship 2017, and as a result forfeited her title.

In April she participated at the Grenke Classic at Baden-Baden. She finished 5th out of eight players, beating Fabiano Caruana and drawing against Magnus Carlsen after having come close to winning.

In June she re-entered the top 100 players, as world no. 85.

In August, she was clear first at the Category 16 50th Biel Chess Festival with 6.5/9 points (+5 −1 =3, TPR 2810).

In September she competed in the Chess World Cup 2017, where she went out in a second-round tiebreak to Levon Aronian, the eventual winner.

=== 2018 ===
In January she competed in the Tata Steel tournament in Wijk aan Zee as the only woman in the field of 14 players, placing last with a score of 2.5/13 (+0−8=5).

From 31 March to 9 April, she participated in the 5th Grenke Chess Classic. She finished equal 8th–9th out of ten with a score of 3½/9 (+0 –2 =7).

=== 2019-Present ===
In December, she won the 2019 Belt and Road World Chess Woman Summit with 5/7 points.

In June 2025, she played for WR Chess team in World Rapid and Blitz Team Chess Championships 2025 held in London; the team won gold medal in blitz.

In December 2025, she played in the Global Chess League 2025 for the team Alpine SG Pipers. She had a strong performance and was named season MVP (female); her team won the gold medal.

== Rating ==
Rated 2686 in the March 2015 FIDE rating list, Hou was the world no. 59 player and world no. 1 woman player (overtaking the recently retired Judit Polgár's rating for the first time). On 1 July 2006, she was the youngest-ever player to enter the Top 50 Women (Number 8) and Top 20 Girls (Number 2) FIDE lists aged 12 (rated 2488), since FIDE began releasing these lists in 2000.

Between the April 2006 and July 2006 FIDE rating lists, she gained 190 rating points from a rating of 2298 to a rating of 2488, which made her the eighth-highest-rated female player, and the second-highest-rated girl, in the world.

Hou is a four-time winner of the honorary Caissa Cup as the best female player of the year (2010, 2011, 2013, 2014).

== Openings ==
Hou Yifan primarily plays 1.e4 as White. As Black, she usually plays the Sicilian Defence (including the Najdorf and Dragon variations) as well as the French Defence against 1.e4, while against 1.d4 she plays the Nimzo-Indian, Bogo-Indian and Queen's Indian defences.

== Notable games ==
Sargissian vs. Hou, 2008

Position: c1 black rook, e2 white king, d2 black pawn, c2 white knight, g3 white pawn, e3 white knight, c3 black pawn, h4 white pawn, f4 white pawn, g6 black pawn, c6 white rook, h7 black pawn, g8 black king, e8 black rook

Final position after 49...Re8

On 25 January 2008, Hou as Black beat GM Gabriel Sargissian (2676) of Armenia, longtime second of Levon Aronian, in the Corus (Group B) tournament, Wijk aan Zee, Netherlands:

1. d4 e6 2. c4 Nf6 3. Nf3 b6 4. g3 Ba6 Queen's Indian Defense: Fianchetto. Nimzowitsch Variation (E15) 5. Qc2 Bb4+ 6. Bd2 Be7 7. e4 d5 8. cxd5 Bxf1 9. Kxf1 exd5 10. e5 Ne4 11. Nc3 Nxd2+ A novelty. 12. Nxd2 Qd7 13. Kg2 Nc6 14. Qa4 0-0 15. Rac1 f6? 16.Nd1 Nxe5 17.Qxd7 Nxd7 18.Rxc7 Bb4 19.Nf3 +/−; better was 15...Rfd8. 16. f4 fxe5 17. dxe5 Bb4 18. Rhf1 Rac8 19. Ne2 Nxe5 20. Qxb4 Nd3 21. Qb3 Nxc1 22. Nxc1 Rce8 23. Nf3 Qf5 24. Rf2 c5 25. Qd3 Qe4 26. Rd2 d4 27. Qxe4 Rxe4 28. Nd3 Re6 29. h4 Rc8 30. a4 a6 31. Nfe5 b5 32. a5 g6 33. Rc2 c4 34. Nb4 Rf8 35. b3 d3 36. Rd2 Rc8 37. Rd1 Rd6 38. Kf3 d2 39. bxc4 bxc4 40. Nc2 c3 41. Ke2 Rd5 42. Ng4 Rxa5 43. Nge3 Rd8 44. Rb1 Ra2 45. Kd1 Rb2 46. Ra1 Rdb8 47. Rxa6 Rb1+ 48. Ke2 Rc1 49. Rc6 Re8 0–1 If 50.Kd3, then ...Rxc2 follows. If 50.Rxc3, then ...d1=Q+.

At the 2017 Biel Chess Festival, Hou as Black beat GM Rafael Vaganian after a kingside combination beginning with 20...Bxg2, described in The Spectator as "the start of a brilliant combination".

== Views ==
=== Male–female skill gap at the top-level ===
Hou claimed that there are many reasons for the lack of female contenders at the chess top level. She says there is a physical aspect to long chess games that might advantage men, and that men generally work harder at chess than women growing up. She uses Chinese girls as an example and points out that most prefer a balanced life, prioritizing things such as university and family life at the cost of working on chess. But she claims there also are external factors: girls playing chess growing up are only encouraged to compete for the girls' title, which might lower their motivation.

== See also ==
- List of chess grandmasters
- List of female chess players
- Chess prodigy

Awards and achievements
Preceded by Li Ruofan	Women's Chinese Chess Champion; 2007, 2008	Succeeded by Shen Yang
Preceded by Alexandra Kosteniuk	Women's World Chess Champion; 2010–2012	Succeeded by Anna Ushenina
Preceded by Anna Ushenina	Women's World Chess Champion; 2013–2015	Succeeded by Mariya Muzychuk
Preceded by Mariya Muzychuk	Women's World Chess Champion; 2016–2017	Succeeded by Tan Zhongyi
