= Gibraltar Chess Festival =

Annual chess tournament held in Gibraltar

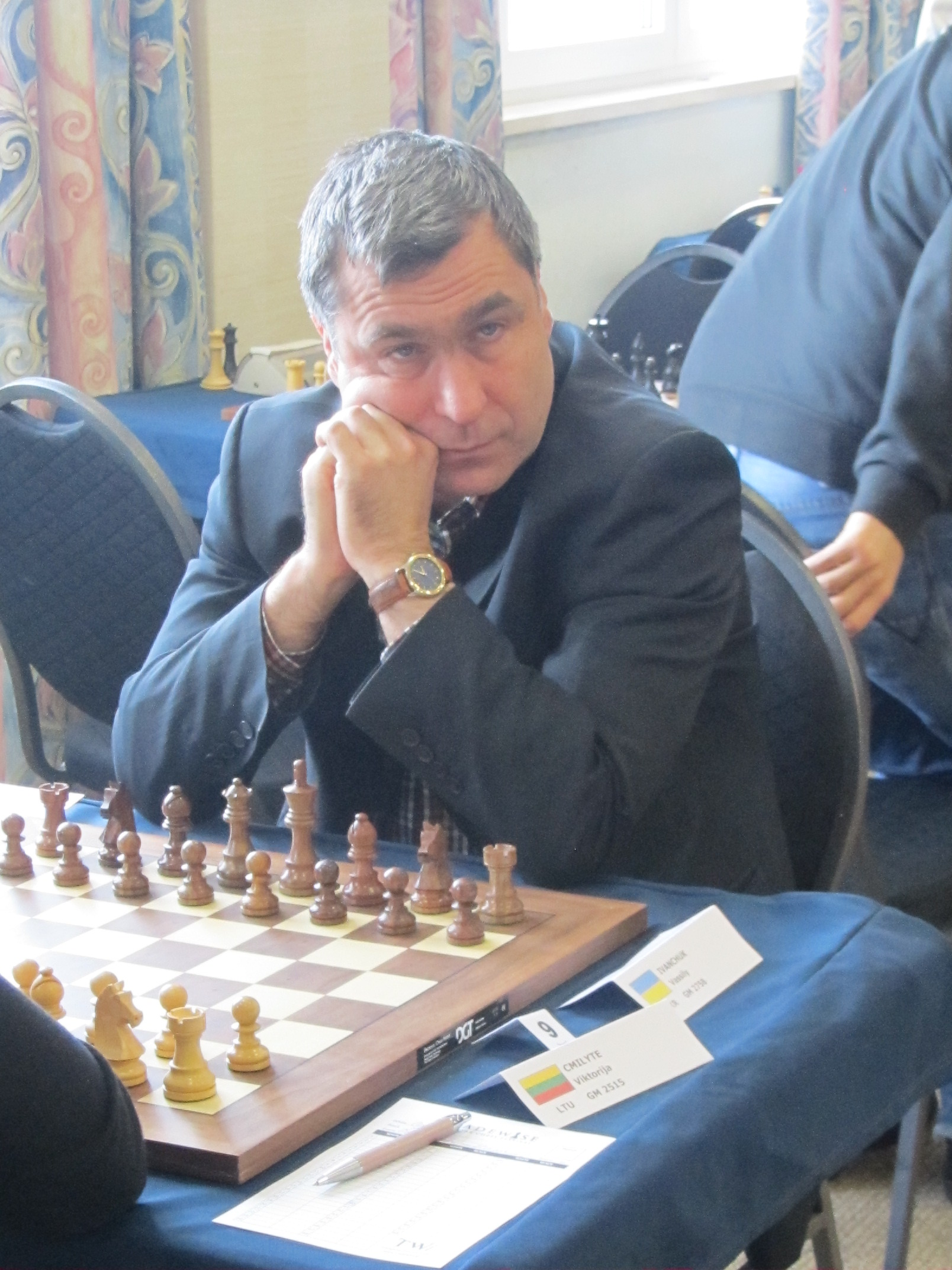
Vasyl Ivanchuk at the 2013 edition

The Gibraltar International Chess Festival was a chess tournament held annually at the Caleta Hotel in Gibraltar. Its eleven days of competition usually run from late January to early February. The inaugural edition, then known as the Gibtelecom Gibraltar Chess Festival, took place in 2003, when fifty-nine competitors took part, of whom 24 held the FIDE Grandmaster title. In 2011 the festival was renamed to the Tradewise Gibraltar Chess Festival when Tradewise Insurance Company Ltd became the new primary sponsor. Beginning in 2019 Tradewise no longer sponsored the tournament and the name was changed to the Gibraltar International Chess Festival.

== History ==
The main event, the Masters, was open to all, and was voted the best open event in the world by the Association of Chess Professionals in 2011, 2012, 2013 and 2014. Since 2011 an annual Gibraltar Junior International Chess Festival, also held at the Caleta Hotel, has been organised. It lasts five days and takes place in August and it comprises two events: under-16 and under-12.

The Director of the Gibraltar International Chess Festival has been Stuart Conquest since 2011.

In 2012, special stamps were issued by the Gibraltar Post Office to commemorate the tenth edition of the chess festival.

In 2012 Chinese grandmaster Hou Yifan, at the time ranked number two female chess player in the world, scored 8 points from a possible 10 in the Masters, tying for first place with Nigel Short before losing a play-off match for the first prize. During this event Hou Yifan defeated Judit Polgár, number one rated female chess player in the world from 1989 to her retirement as a professional player in 2014.

The highest score achieved in a Gibraltar Masters event has been 9 points from a possible 10, by Vasyl Ivanchuk in 2011, with a performance rating of 2968.

In 2017, Hou Yifan caused controversy by intentionally losing her final game of the tournament in 5 moves against Babu M.R. Lalith to protest the pairings. Hou had grown dissatisfied in recent years with playing in women-only tournaments, and had just dropped out of the Women's World Chess Championship cycle. In Gibraltar, she faced 7 women in her 10 games when the men/women ratio in the tournament was 4:1. The incident was resolved as an extremely unlikely series of computer-generated pairings which nevertheless actually happened, and the result of the protest game stood.

== List of winners ==
Since 2007, ties for first place in the Masters have been resolved by a tie-break.

Year	Winner(s)	Leading Female(s)
2003	(Greece) Vasilios Kotronias (England) Nigel Short	(Hungary) Nóra Medvegy
2004	(England) Nigel Short	(Sweden) Pia Cramling
2005	(Armenia) Levon Aronian (Ukraine) Zahar Efimenko (Bulgaria) Kiril Georgiev (Spain) Alexei Shirov (Israel) Emil Sutovsky	(Georgia (country)) Ketevan Arakhamia-Grant (Lithuania) Viktorija Čmilytė (Sweden) Pia Cramling (Poland) Iweta Radziewicz (France) Almira Skripchenko
2006	(Bulgaria) Kiril Georgiev	(Bulgaria) Antoaneta Stefanova
2007	(Armenia) Vladimir Akopian	(England) Jovanka Houska
2008	(United States) Hikaru Nakamura	(Scotland) Ketevan Arakhamia-Grant
2009	(Russia) Peter Svidler	(Georgia (country)) Nana Dzagnidze
2010	(England) Michael Adams	(Ukraine) Natalia Zhukova
2011	(Ukraine) Vasyl Ivanchuk	(Georgia (country)) Nana Dzagnidze
2012	(England) Nigel Short	(China) Hou Yifan
2013	(Russia) Nikita Vitiugov	(China) Zhao Xue
2014	(Bulgaria) Ivan Cheparinov	(Ukraine) Mariya Muzychuk
2015	(United States) Hikaru Nakamura	(China) Hou Yifan
2016	(United States) Hikaru Nakamura	(Ukraine) Anna Muzychuk
2017	(United States) Hikaru Nakamura	(China) Ju Wenjun
2018	(Armenia) Levon Aronian	(Sweden) Pia Cramling
2019	(Russia) Vladislav Artemiev	(China) Tan Zhongyi
2020	(Russia) David Paravyan	(China) Tan Zhongyi
