= World Rapid and Blitz Team Chess Championships =

Worldwide chess event

The FIDE World Rapid and Blitz Team Chess Championships is a team tournament in chess, played under rapid and blitz time controls are organized by the International Chess Federation (FIDE) in collaboration with WR Logistics GmbH.

== History ==
=== 2023 ===
The first tournament took place in Düsseldorf, Germany, from August 26 to 28, 2023.

The 2023 edition consisted only of a rapid section, with no blitz section.

The FIDE World Rapid Team Championship followed the Swiss system with 12 rounds. The tournament rules required each team to include at least one female player and at least one player who had not achieved a FIDE Standard, Rapid, or Blitz Rating of 2000 Elo points or was unrated.

The list of participants of the championship included former world champions, such as Viswanathan Anand, Vladimir Kramnik, Hou Yifan, Mariya Muzychuk and Alexandra Kosteniuk, as well as World Championships runners-ups, World Cup winners, and former world champions in rapid and blitz chess.

Approximately 300 participants worldwide, including over 15 Olympic champions, formed up 36 teams to compete.

=== 2024 ===
The 2024 tournament between club teams included both rapid and blitz time formats. It organized by the International Chess Federation (FIDE) in collaboration with the KazChess/Kazakhstan Chess Federation (KCF), with financial support from Freedom Holding Corp. The tournament took place from August 1 to 5, 2024, in Astana, Kazakhstan.

According to the tournament regulations, teams consisted of 6-9 players. Matches between teams in both rapid and blitz were played on six boards, with each team required to have at least one female player (5th board) and one amateur player (6th board) whose FIDE rating in any time control—standard, rapid, or blitz—had never reached 2000 Elo points (as of registration). The team captain could be a playing member.

The 2024 World Rapid Team Championship took place from August 2 to 4 and consisted of 12 rounds using a Swiss system.

The 2024 World Blitz Team Championship was held on August 5 in two phases. In the first phase, teams played in a round-robin format in five groups (A, B, C, D, and E) of 8 teams each. The top three teams from each group, along with the best fourth-placed team, advanced to the knockout phase. The draw for the Round of 16 was conducted based on the standings in the groups and the average ratings of the teams. The top 16 teams then competed in a knockout format: Round of 16 — Quarterfinals — Semifinals — Final.

Over 300 participants from around the world formed 40 teams for the competition. Among the participants were both current (Ding Liren and Ju Wenjun) and former world champions (Magnus Carlsen, Hou Yifan, Alexandra Kosteniuk), as well as vice-champions, World Cup winners, and world champions in rapid and blitz from various years.

=== 2025 ===
World Rapid and Blitz Team Championships 2025 were held in London, United Kingdom. Team MGD1 won the World Rapid Team Championship, and WR Chess Team successfully defended their blitz title.

=== 2026 ===
World Rapid and Blitz Team Championships 2026 were held in Hong Kong. Dragon Chilling won both the World Rapid Team Championship and the World Blitz Championship, becoming first team to win both the titles in the same edition.

== Winners ==
Year	Winner Rapid	Winner Blitz
2023	WR Chess	Not held
2024	Al-Ain ACMG UAE	WR Chess
2025	Team MGD1	WR Chess
2026	Dragon Chilling	Dragon Chilling
