= Women's World Chess Championship 2018 (May) =

Chess match between Tan Zhongyi and Ju Wenjun

Women's World Chess Championship Match 2018
- Shanghai & Chongqing, China
- 3–18 May 2018
	Defending champion	Challenger
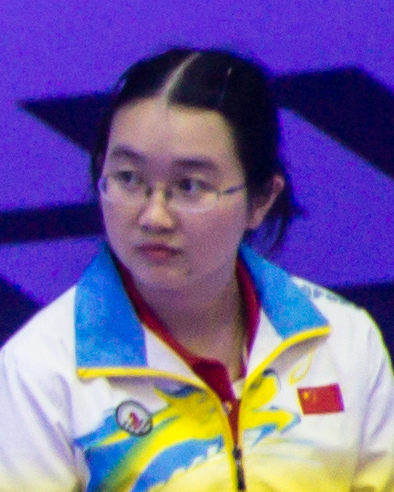
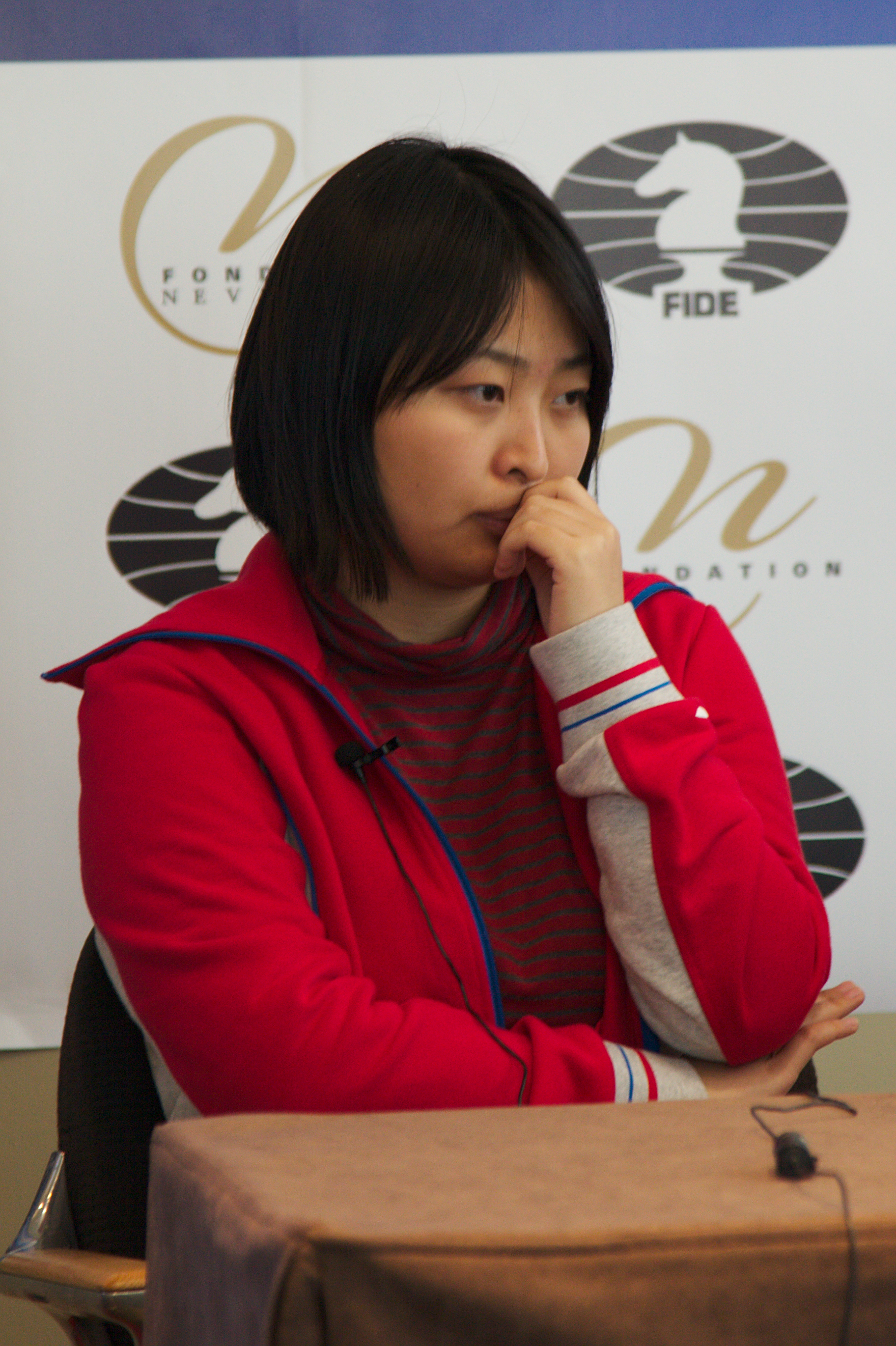
	(China) Tan Zhongyi	(China) Ju Wenjun
	4½	Scores	5½
Game 1	½	63 move draw	½
Game 2	0	55 moves →	1
Game 3	0	27 moves →	1
Game 4	1	← 35 moves	0
Game 5	0	35 moves →	1
Game 6	1	← 125 moves	0
Game 7	½	33 move draw	½
Game 8	½	32 move draw	½
Game 9	½	80 move draw	½
Game 10	½	70 move draw	½
	Born 29 May 1991; 26 years old	Born 31 January 1991; 27 years old
	Winner of the Women's World Chess Championship 2017	Winner of the FIDE Women's Grand Prix 2015–16
	Rating: 2522 (World No. 10)	Rating: 2571 (World No. 2)

The 2018 Women's World Chess Championship Match was a match held between Tan Zhongyi, the 2017 Women's World Chess champion, and her challenger, Ju Wenjun, to determine the new women's world chess champion. Ju Wenjun qualified by winning the FIDE Women's Grand Prix 2015–16.

The match took place from 2 to 20 May 2018 and was played in two halves, the first in Shanghai, the latter in Chongqing. Ju Wenjun won 5½–4½.

== Competitors ==
=== 2015–16 Grand Prix winner ===
The challenger qualified by winning the FIDE Women's Grand Prix 2015–16. Hou Yifan had won the first tournament but then withdrew from the Grand Prix. After four of five tournaments, the leader was Koneru Humpy with 335 points, who had already played her three tournaments. In second place followed Ju Wenjun with 253⅓ and one event left. The final tournament was held from 11 to 31 October 2016, and Ju Wenjun won the tournament convincingly, thus overtaking Koneru Humpy. Koneru Humpy thereby finished overall runner-up for the fourth time.

=== 2017 knock-out world champion ===
The winner of the Women's World Chess Championship 2017 has the right to defend her title in the match. The 64-player knockout tournament was initially scheduled for October 2016, but postponed due to the lack of an organizer. The tournament was played in Tehran, Iran, from 10 to 28 February 2017.

Ju Wenjun advanced to the quarter-finals, where she was knocked out. Had she won, the challenger would have been the Grand Prix runner-up Koneru Humpy.

The final was played between Tan Zhongyi and Anna Muzychuk as a four-game match. After a calm draw in game 1, Tan Zhongyi won game 2 with the white pieces.

== Head-to-head record ==
Prior to the match the two players had met 16 times at classical time control. Tan Zhongyi led the pairing, having won 3, drawn 11, and lost 2 games.

== Match ==
The match was contested over ten games at classical time control, with additional rapid and blitz tie-breaks if needed.

Colors were drawn at the opening ceremony. Colors are also reversed after game 4 to even out any advantage of first playing White. The time control is set at 90 minutes for the first 40 moves with the addition of 30 minutes for the rest of the game. There is an increment of 30 seconds per move from move 1.

=== Schedule ===
Shanghai

- Opening ceremony: 2 May (Draw of Colors)
- Game 1: 3 May
- Game 2: 4 May
- Game 3: 6 May
- Game 4: 7 May
- Game 5: 9 May

Chongqing

- Game 6: 12 May
- Game 7: 13 May
- Game 8: 15 May
- Game 9: 16 May
- Game 10: 18 May
- Closing ceremony: 19 May

=== Results ===
Women's World Chess Championship Match 2018
Player	Rating	1	2	3	4	5	6	7	8	9	10	Points
Tan Zhongyi (China)	2522	½	0	0	1	0	1	½	½	½	½	4½
Ju Wenjun (China)	2571	½	1	1	0	1	0	½	½	½	½	5½
Game Links												

== Future ==
Due to various hosting and timing issues, the championships had varied from their intended annual calendar, pushing the 2017 event into early 2018. FIDE returned to schedule by holding a second Women's World Chess Championship 2018 (tournament), with the full 64-player knock-out in November, culminating with the final two players competing for the championship title. The event was held in Khanty-Mansiysk, Russia. Ju Wenjun entered the tournament as top rated player and won the event.
