= 2026–2027 FIDE Women's Circuit =

2026–2027 FIDE Circuit
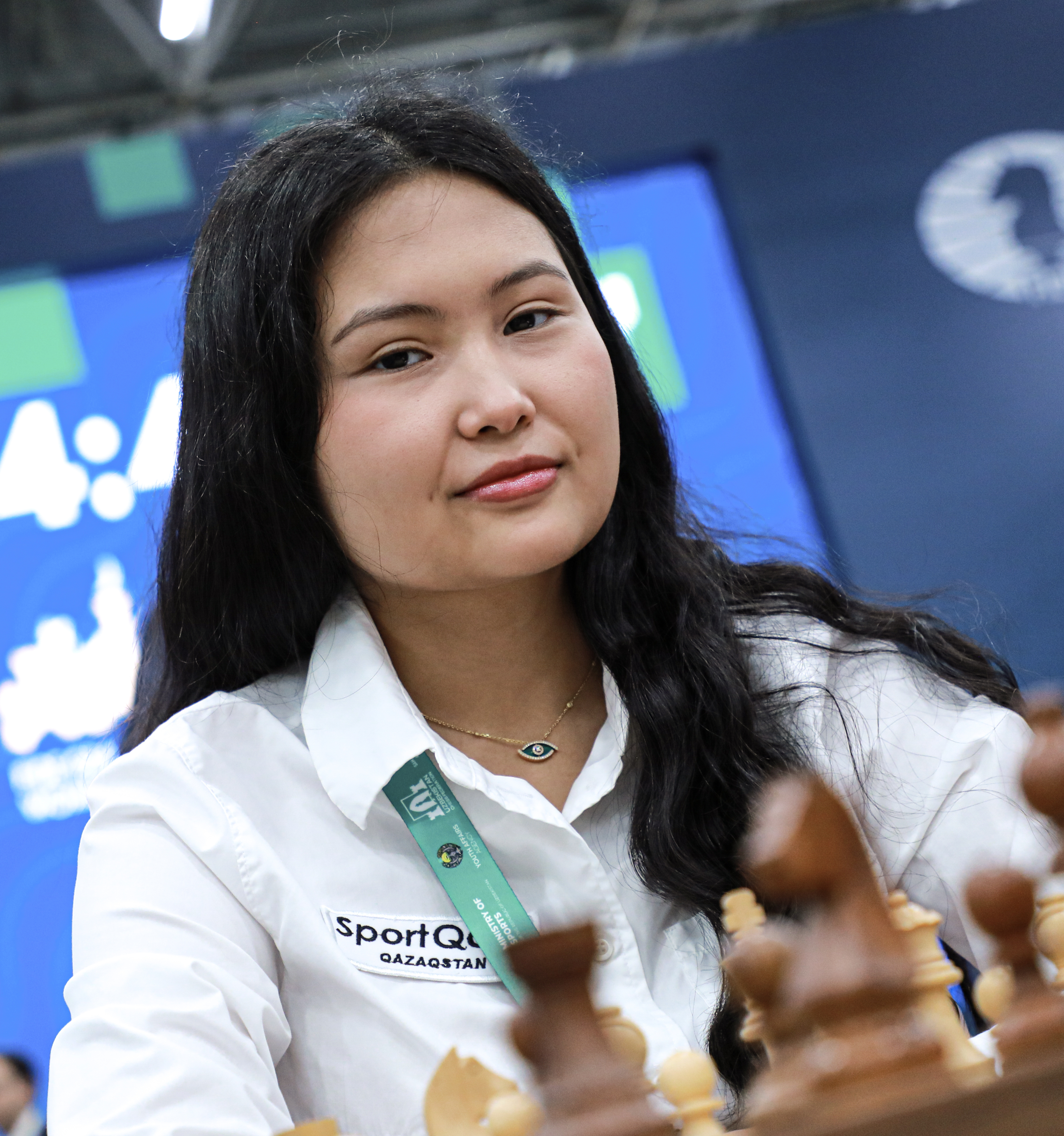
- FIDE Circuit leader Bibisara Assaubayeva
- Sport: Chess
- Duration: 9 January 2026 – December 2027

Seasons
- ← 2024-2025

The 2026–2027 FIDE Women's Circuit is a system comprising the top women's chess tournaments in 2026 and 2027, which will serve as a qualification path for the Women's Candidates Tournament 2028. Players receive points based on their performance and the strength of the tournament. A player's final Circuit score will be the sum of their twelve (at maximum, subject to regulations) best results of the year.

It is the women's equivalent of the 2026–2027 FIDE Circuit (open category), succeeding the FIDE Women's Events 2024-2025.

== Eligible tournaments ==
As per regulation 2.1 of the regulations, eligible tournaments are:

- FIDE‐rated women's individual over‐the‐board standard tournaments
- World Women's Rapid and Blitz Championships, 2026 and 2027
- Continental over‐the‐board Rapid and Blitz Championships 2026 and 2027
- Women's standard national championships
- Other pre‐approved FIDE‐rated tournaments

The following tournaments must follow the criteria mentioned below, unless granted exception.

- Finish between
  - 1 January 2026 and 21 December 2027 (for national women's championships, zonal & continental women's tournaments and traditional women's open tournaments with at least 50 players)
  - 1 January 2026 and 15 December 2027 (for all other eligible tournaments)
  - Exceptions: Women's World Rapid and Blitz Championships 2027 shall be counted irrespective of the dates
- The tournament must have at least
  - 6 players with TAR of at least 2400 (for double round-robin tournaments)
  - 8 players (for all other formats)
  - Exception: Women's World Chess Championship 2026 shall be considered though it has only 2 players.
- The number of rounds in the tournament must be at least
  - 4 (for knockout tournaments)
  - 7 (for all other formats)
- TAR of the eligible tournaments must not be less than
  - 2400 (If a tournament is not eligible without FIDE General Assembly approval)
  - 2300 (for all tournaments which do not require General Assembly approval)
- All the players in a tournament must represent at least 3 federations and no more than 50% of 20 highest rated players (or all players if less than 20) shall represent the same federation.
  - Exceptions: National Women's Championships and Zonal Women's Championships (if the zone represents only 1 federation
- Women's World Chess Championship 2026 shall be a recognized tournament irrespective of any of the regulations stated above.

== Points system ==
=== Event points ===
Circuit points obtained by a player from a tournament are calculated as follows:

$$P = B \times k \times w$$

where:

- $P$ - Points obtained by player from the tournament
- $B$ - Basic points
- $k$ - Tournament strength factor, calculated as $k = (TAR-2250) / 100$
- $w$ - Tournament weighting
  - 1.0 - Standard (classical) tournaments with at most 1 multi game-day
  - 0.9 - Double Round Robin Tournaments with 6 players and classical tournaments with 2 multi-game days
  - 0.85 - Standard tournaments with 3 multi-game days
  - 0.8 - World Rapid Championship, Knockout Tournaments with fewer than 6 rounds and standard tournaments with 4 multi-game days
  - 0.75 - Standard tournaments with 5 multi-game days
  - 0.7 - Standard tournaments with 6 or more multi-game days
  - 0.6 - World Women's Blitz Championships, Continental Women's Rapid Championships and other eligible women's rapid tournaments
  - 0.5 - Mixed Rapid & Blitz tournaments
  - 0.4 - Continental Blitz Championships and other eligible blitz tournaments

If multiple weighting coefficients apply, these are multiplied together.

=== Basic points ===
Basic points for a tournament are awarded depending on the tournament format:

- Swiss-system: Top 8 (within top half of ranking), ties included.
- Double round-robins 6-7 players: Top 2 with ties.
- Round-robins 8-10 players: Top 3 with ties.
- Round-robins 11-13 players: Top 4 with ties.
- Round-robins 14 players: Top 5 with ties.
- Knockout: Third round or later, up to 8 players.

Points are awarded as follows:

1st	2nd	3rd	4th	5th	6th	7th	8th
11/10	8	7	6	5	4	3	2

- 11 points for an outright winner with no tie-break criteria applied (in Knockout tournaments, victory in the Final after only the games with the longest time control have been played). Otherwise, 10 basic points will be used for calculation.
- For tied positions, basic points are calculated as 50% of points for final ranking as determined by tournament's tie-break rules, plus 50% of the sum of basic points assigned for the tied places divided by the number of tied players. If no tie-break rule is applied, basic points are shared equally among all tied players.

=== Player's total and ranking ===
A player's point total for the ranking is the sum of their best 12 tournaments with the following criteria:

Tournaments	Standard events with under 50 players allowed	Rapid/Blitz allowed
8–10	6	3
11	7	4
12	8	4

- If player has 11 or 12 tournaments to count:
  - No more than 7 or 8 respectively standard tournaments with the participation of less than 50 players can be counted.
  - No more than 4 rapid/blitz tournaments can be counted.
- If player has 10 tournaments or less:
  - No more than 6 standard tournaments with participation of less than 50 players can be counted.
  - No more than 3 rapid/blitz tournament can be counted.

== Tournaments ==
"Open" refers to classical tournaments with 50 or more participants.

- : Ongoing event
- M: Masters

2026–2027 FIDE Women's Circuit – Eligible Tournaments
Tournament	Location	Date	Type	Players	TAR	Winner
European Women's Blitz Championship 2025	(Monaco) Monte Carlo	9 January 2026	Blitz; Continental	127	2427 2/3	(Netherlands) Eline Roebers
European Women's Rapid Championship 2025	(Monaco) Monte Carlo	10–11 January 2026	Rapid; Continental	143	2427 2/3	(Georgia (country)) Nino Batsiashvili
International Women’s Chess Championship (M)	(Uzbekistan) Bukhara	9–15 March 2026	Round robin	10	2424 7/10	(Azerbaijan) Ulviyya Fataliyeva
Women's Candidates Tournament	(Cyprus) Pegeia	28 March – 16 April 2026	Double round robin	8	2520	(India) Vaishali Rameshbabu
Norway Chess Women	(Norway) Oslo	25 May – 5 June 2026	Double round robin	6	2531 1/2	(Kazakhstan) Bibisara Assaubayeva
European Women's Championship	(Georgia (country)) Batumi	25 May – 5 June 2026	Continental	165	2422 5/12	(Ukraine) Anastasiia Hnatyshyn
Asian Women's Championship	(Mongolia) Ulaanbaatar	29 May – 6 June 2026	Continental	102	2392 7/12	(India) Savitha Shri Baskar
Asian Women’s Rapid Championship	Hong Kong	28 July-29 July 2026	Rapid; Continental	50	2356 2/3	(India) Harika Dronavalli
Asian Women’s Blitz Championship	Hong Kong	30 July 2026	Blitz; Continental	46	2356 2/3	(India) Harika Dronavalli
Cairns Cup	(United States) St. Louis	10—20 August 2026	Round Robin	10	2491 3/5	(China) Tan Zhongyi
Russian Women's Championship Superfinal	(Russia) Rostov-on-Don	1–12 October 2026	National Round Robin	12	2318 5/6	(FIDE) Leya Garifullina
US Women's Championship	(United States) St. Louis	7–23 October 2026	National Round Robin	12	2350 2/3	(United States) Rachael Li
President Cup (M)	(Uzbekistan) Tashkent	28 November – 6 December 2026	Round Robin	10		
Kazakhstan Women’s Cup	(Kazakhstan) Almaty	1–11 December 2026	National Round Robin	12		
Women's World Rapid Championship 2026	(Turkey) Istanbul	26–28 December 2026	Rapid FIDE			
World Blitz Championship 2026	(Turkey) Istanbul	29–30 December 2026	Blitz FIDE			

== Ranking ==
At the end of 2027, the top two finishers in the Circuit qualifies the Women's Candidates Tournament 2028, provided that they play in at least 8 tournaments (including at least 5 in standard time controls) and she plays at least 4 standard tournaments with participations of more than 50 players (if they played in 11 or 12 tournaments) or at least 3 standard tournament with participations of more than 50 players (if they played in 10 tournaments).

Tournament results which can't be counted for qualification for the Women's Candidates Tournament 2028 are marked in pink.

- : Current leaders – set to qualify for Women's Candidates Tournament 2028 (Next top leader if the current top player has already qualified through other route)
- : Current Women's World Champion – ineligible for Women's Candidates Tournament 2028 qualification
- : Player qualified for Women's Candidates Tournament 2028 via another path
- : Player ineligible for Women's Candidates Tournament 2028 qualification

Top 50 Standings as of 23 October 2026
#	Player	Points	Events	1	2	3	4	5	6	7	8	9	10	11	12
1	(Kazakhstan) Bibisara Assaubayeva	59.76	3	(FIDE) Candidates 2nd – 21.60	Norway Chess 1st – 29.70	(United States) Cairns Cup T 3rd-4th – 8.46	Required					Optional			
2	(China) Zhu Jiner	39.83	2	(FIDE) Candidates 3rd – 18.24	Norway Chess 2nd – 21.60	Required						Optional			
3	(United States) Alice Lee	31.38	2	(United States) Cairns Cup 2nd – 19.33	(United States) US Women's Championship 2nd – 12.05	Required						Optional			
4	(India) Vaishali Rameshbabu	29.70	2	(FIDE) Candidates 1st – 29.73	(United States) Cairns Cup 10th – 0.00	Required						Optional			
5	(China) Tan Zhongyi	26.58	2	(FIDE) Candidates 8th – 0.00	(United States) Cairns Cup 1st – 26.58	Required						Optional			
6	(India) Harika Dronavalli	20.55	3	(Uzbekistan) International Women’s Championship (M) 3rd – 9.78	(FIDE) Asian Women's Rapid Championship 2026 1st – 6.08	(FIDE) Asian Women's Blitz Championship 2026 1st – 4.69	Required					Optional			
7	(Ukraine) Anastasiia Hnatyshyn	18.97	1	(FIDE) European Women's Championship 2026 1st – 18.97	Required							Optional			
8	(FIDE) Aleksandra Goryachkina	16.88	1	(FIDE) Candidates 4th – 16.89	Required							Optional			
9	(United States) Rachael Li	16.57	1	(United States) US Women's Championship 1st – 16.57	Required							Optional			
10	(Azerbaijan) Ulviyya Fataliyeva	15.37	2	(Uzbekistan) International Women’s Championship (M) 1st – 15.37	(FIDE) European Women's Championship 2026 T 19th-29th – 0.00	Required						Optional			
11	(Uzbekistan) Afruza Khamdamova	14.79	4	(Uzbekistan) International Women’s Championship (M) T 4th-5th – 0.00	(FIDE) Asian Women's Championship 2026 2nd – 12.12	(FIDE) Asian Women's Rapid Championship 2026 T 23rd-28th – 0.00	(FIDE) Asian Women's Blitz Championship 2026 4th – 2.67	Required				Optional			
12	(Netherlands) Eline Roebers	13.89	3	(FIDE) European Women's Rapid Championship 2025 5th – 5.06	(FIDE) European Women's Blitz Championship 2025 1st – 6.75	(FIDE) European Women's Championship 2026 8th – 2.08	Required					Optional			
13	(Georgia (country)) Nino Batsiashvili	13.86	2	(FIDE) European Women's Rapid Championship 2025 1st – 10.13	(FIDE) European Women's Blitz Championship 2025 5th – 3.73	Required						Optional			
14	(India) Savitha Shri Baskar	13.55	2	(Uzbekistan) International Women’s Championship (M) T 18th-21st – 0.00	(FIDE) Asian Women's Championship 2026 1st – 13.55	Required						Optional			
15	(Ukraine) Anna Muzychuk	13.51	3	(FIDE) Candidates 5th – 13.51	Norway Chess 3rd – 0.00	(United States) Cairns Cup T 5th-7th – 0.00	Required					Optional			
16	(Spain) Sabrina Vega	12.93	1	(FIDE) European Women's Championship 2026 2nd – 12.93	Required							Optional			
17	(Austria) Olga Badelka	12.43	3	(FIDE) European Women's Rapid Championship 2025 T 17th-30th – 0.00	(FIDE) European Women's Blitz Championship 2025 T 9th-11th – 0.36	(FIDE) European Women's Championship 2026 3rd – 12.07	Required					Optional			
18	(Bulgaria) Nurgyul Salimova	11.21	1	(FIDE) European Women's Championship 2026 4th – 11.21	Required							Optional			
19	(Georgia (country)) Nana Dzagnidze	11.18	1	(Uzbekistan) International Women’s Championship (M) 2nd – 11.18	Required							Optional			
20	(United States) Irina Krush	10.55	1	(United States) US Women's Championship 1st – 16.57	Required							Optional			
21	(Switzerland) Alexandra Kosteniuk	10.48	3	(FIDE) European Women's Rapid Championship 2025 2nd – 9.06	(FIDE) European Women's Blitz Championship 2025 7th – 1.42	(United States) Cairns Cup 9th – 0.00	Required					Optional			
22	(FIDE) Anna Shukhman	5.82	3	(FIDE) Asian Women's Rapid Championship 2026 2nd – 5.44	(FIDE) Asian Women's Blitz Championship 2026 T 9th-10th – 0.38	(Russia) Russian Women's Championship 4th – 3.10	Required					Optional			
23	(United States) Carissa Yip	8.46	2	(United States) Cairns Cup T 3rd-4th – 8.46	(United States) US Women's Championship T 7th-10th – 0.00	Required						Optional			
24	(Poland) Klaudia Kulon	8.40	3	(FIDE) European Women's Rapid Championship 2025 T 31st-46th – 0.00	(FIDE) European Women's Blitz Championship 2025 8th – 1.07	(FIDE) European Women's Championship 2026 6th – 7.33	Required					Optional			
25	(China) Song Yuxin	8.20	1	(FIDE) Asian Women's Championship 2026 3rd – 8.20	Required							Optional			
26	(Ukraine) Anna Ushenina	8.19	3	(FIDE) European Women's Rapid Championship 2025 T 17th-30th – 0.00	(FIDE) European Women's Blitz Championship 2025 T 12th-20th – 0.00	(FIDE) European Women's Championship 2026 5th – 8.19	Required					Optional			
27	(China) Gao Muziyan	7.49	1	(FIDE) Asian Women's Championship 2026 4th – 7.49	Required							Optional			
28	(FIDE) Valentina Gunina	7.41	2	(FIDE) Asian Women's Rapid Championship 2026 4th – 4.00	(FIDE) Asian Women's Blitz Championship 2026 2nd – 3.41	(Russia) Russian Women's Championship 11th – 0.00	Required					Optional			
29	(Kazakhstan) Meruert Kamalidenova	6.77	1	(FIDE) Asian Women's Championship 2026 5th – 6.77	Required							Optional			
30	(FIDE) Leya Garifullina	6.54	2	(Uzbekistan) International Women’s Championship (M) T 4th-5th – 0.00	(Russia) Russian Women's Championship 1st – 6.54	Required						Optional			
31	(Vietnam) Phạm Lê Thảo Nguyên	6.45	2	(FIDE) Asian Women's Rapid Championship 2026 3rd – 4.32	(FIDE) Asian Women's Blitz Championship 2026 5th – 2.13	Required						Optional			
32	(Georgia (country)) Bella Khotenashvili	6.40	3	(FIDE) European Women's Rapid Championship 2025 T 31st-46th – 0.00	(FIDE) European Women's Blitz Championship 2025 2nd – 6.04	(FIDE) European Women's Championship 2026 T 9th-18th – 0.36	Required					Optional			
33	(Georgia (country)) Sopio Gvetadze	6.13	3	(FIDE) European Women's Rapid Championship 2025 3rd – 6.13	(FIDE) European Women's Blitz Championship 2025 T 41st-58th – 0.00	(FIDE) European Women's Championship 2026 T 52nd-74th – 0.00	Required					Optional			
34	(India) Vantika Agrawal	6.06	1	(FIDE) Asian Women's Championship 2026 4th – 7.49	Required							Optional			
35	(Estonia) Mai Narva	5.96	2	(FIDE) European Women's Rapid Championship 2025 4th – 5.60	(FIDE) European Women's Blitz Championship 2025 T 12th-20th – 0.00	(FIDE) European Women's Championship 2026 T 9th-18th – 0.36	Required					Optional			
36	(Uzbekistan) Umida Omonova	5.92	2	(Uzbekistan) International Women’s Championship (M) 7th – 0.00	(FIDE) Asian Women's Rapid Championship 2026 5th – 3.04	(FIDE) Asian Women's Blitz Championship 2026 3rd – 2.88	Required					Optional			
37	(FIDE) Ekaterina Goltseva	5.85	1	(Russia) Russian Women's Championship 2nd – 5.85	Required							Optional			
38	(Kazakhstan) Zarina Nurgaliyeva	5.35	3	(FIDE) Asian Women's Championship 2026 7th – 5.35	(FIDE) Asian Women's Rapid Championship 2026 T 13th-19th – 0.00	(FIDE) Asian Women's Blitz Championship 2026 T 11th-21st – 0.00	Required					Optional			
39	(FIDE) Anastasia Bodnaruk	4.82	1	(Russia) Russian Women's Championship 3rd – 4.82	Required							Optional			
40	(India) Mary Ann Gomes	4.63	1	(FIDE) Asian Women's Championship 2026 8th – 4.63	Required							Optional			
41	(Turkey) Ekaterina Atalik	4.53	3	(FIDE) European Women's Rapid Championship 2025 6th – 4.53	(FIDE) European Women's Blitz Championship 2025 T 41st-58th – 0.00	(FIDE) European Women's Championship 2026 T 155th-160th – 0.00	Required					Optional			
42	(United States) Thalia Cervantes Landeiro	4.52	1	(United States) US Women's Championship T 4th-5th – 4.52	Required							Optional			
43	(United States) Megan Paragua	4.52	1	(United States) US Women's Championship T 4th-5th – 4.52	Required							Optional			
44	(Poland) Oliwia Kiołbasa	4.44	3	(FIDE) European Women's Rapid Championship 2025 T 9th-16th – 0.00	(FIDE) European Women's Blitz Championship 2025 3rd – 4.44	(FIDE) European Women's Championship 2026 T 30th-51st – 0.00	Required					Optional			
45	(Ukraine) Yuliia Osmak	4.09	4	(FIDE) European Women's Rapid Championship 2025 T 9th-16th – 0.00	(FIDE) European Women's Blitz Championship 2025 4th – 4.09	(Uzbekistan) International Women’s Championship (M) 8th – 0.00	(FIDE) European Women's Championship 2026 T 112nd-136th – 0.00	Required				Optional			
46	(Greece) Anastasia Avramidou	4.00	3	(FIDE) European Women's Rapid Championship 2025 7th – 4.00	(FIDE) European Women's Blitz Championship 2025 T 33rd-40th – 0.00	(FIDE) European Women's Championship 2026 T 19th-29th – 0.00	Required					Optional			
47	(Kazakhstan) Xeniya Balabayeva	3.74	2	(FIDE) Asian Women's Rapid Championship 2026 6th – 2.72	(FIDE) Asian Women's Blitz Championship 2026 7th – 1.02	Required						Optional			
48	(Romania) Irina Bulmaga	3.46	3	(FIDE) European Women's Rapid Championship 2025 8th – 3.46	(FIDE) European Women's Blitz Championship 2025 T 33rd-40th – 0.00	(FIDE) European Women's Championship 2026 T 30th-51st – 0.00	Required					Optional			
49	(Poland) Alicja Śliwicka	3.38	2	(FIDE) European Women's Rapid Championship 2025 T 9th-16th – 0.00	(FIDE) European Women's Blitz Championship 2025 6th – 3.38	(FIDE) European Women's Championship 2026 T 30th-51st – 0.00	Required					Optional			
50	(Italy) Olga Zimina	2.95	1	(FIDE) European Women's Championship 2026 7th – 2.95	Required							Optional			
