= Speed Chess Championship =

Annual blitz chess tournaments

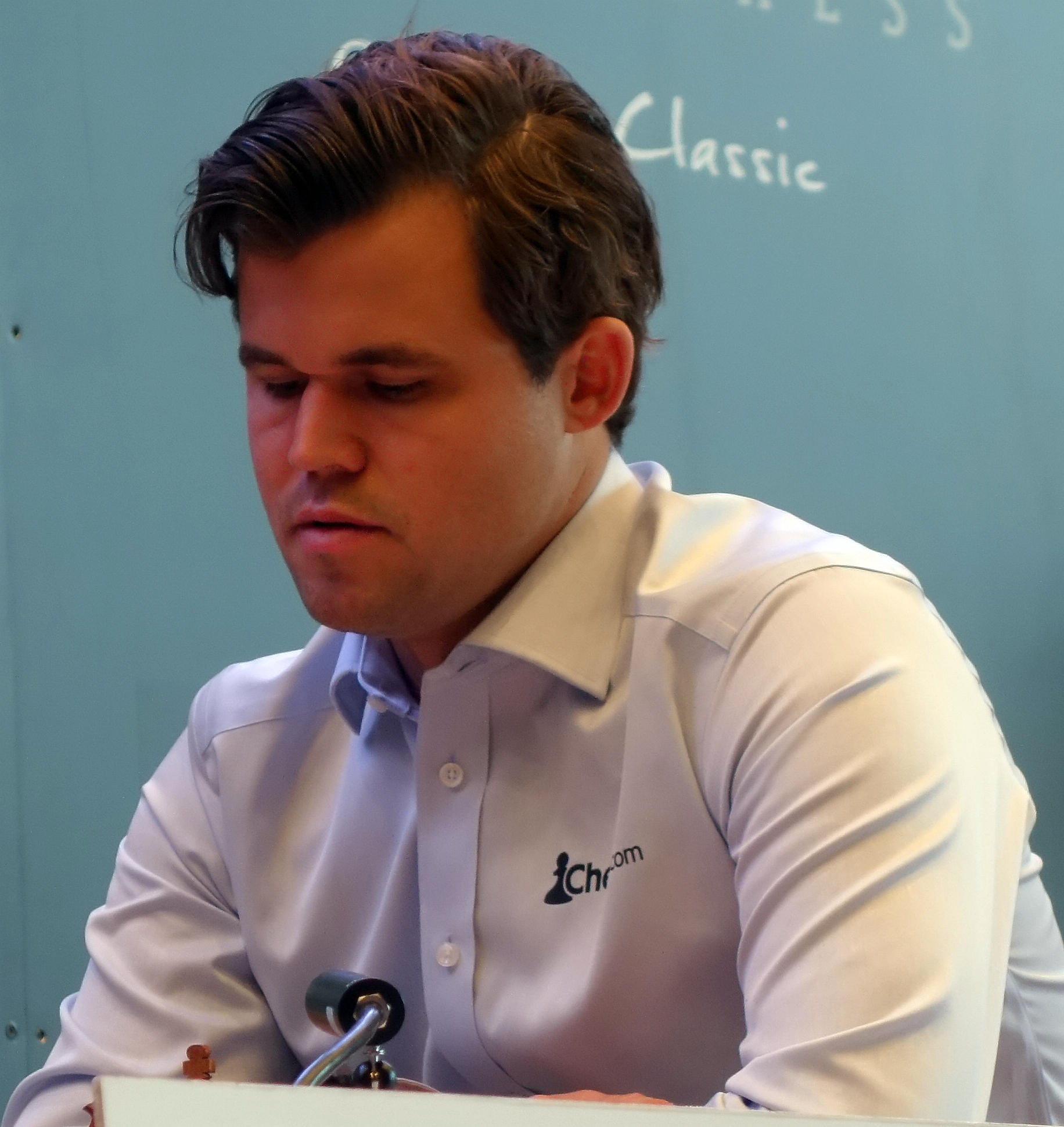
Magnus Carlsen, five-time speed chess champion.

The Speed Chess Championships are a family of annual blitz chess tournaments held and hosted by the online chess platform Chess.com.

== History ==
The reigning Speed Chess Champion is Norwegian grandmaster Magnus Carlsen, who has won the main event five times out of seven appearances. American grandmaster Hikaru Nakamura, who has played in every single edition to date, has also won the event five times, consecutively from 2018 to 2022. He had also reached every final until 2024, when he was knocked out in the semifinals for the first time.

Since 2019, Chess.com has also held the Women's Speed Chess Championship and Junior Speed Chess Championship. (Note: The Junior and IM Not a GM events were last held in 2023.) American Prodigy Alice lee is the reigning Women's Speed Chess Champion. In 2020, the Youth Speed Chess Championship and IM Not A GM Speed Chess Championship were introduced as further spin-off events.

The 2024 Finals, for the first time, were held live in Paris. The event attracted media attention due to the matchup between Carlsen and American grandmaster Hans Niemann, which was their first live meeting since their 2022 controversy. Although the players were physically present at the venue, the games were played online on on-site computers in an esports-style format, with a live audience present.

In 2025, Chess.com announced that the winner of the Speed Chess Championship thereafter would be awarded the Naroditsky Cup, in tribute to American grandmaster and commentator Daniel Naroditsky, who died on October 19th, 2025.

== List of winners ==
Speed Chess Championship finals
No.	Year	Winner	Runner-up	Final score	Prize fund
1	2016	(Norway) Magnus Carlsen	(United States) Hikaru Nakamura	14½-10½	$40,000
2	2017	(Norway) Magnus Carlsen	(United States) Hikaru Nakamura	18-9	$50,000
3	2018	(United States) Hikaru Nakamura	(United States) Wesley So	15½-12½	$55,000
4	2019	(United States) Hikaru Nakamura	(United States) Wesley So	19½-14½	$50,000
5	2020	(United States) Hikaru Nakamura	(France) Maxime Vachier-Lagrave	18½-12½	$100,000
6	2021	(United States) Hikaru Nakamura	(United States) Wesley So	23-8	$100,000
7	2022	(United States) Hikaru Nakamura	(Norway) Magnus Carlsen	14½-13½	$100,000
8	2023	(Norway) Magnus Carlsen	(United States) Hikaru Nakamura	13½-12½	$150,000
9	2024	(Norway) Magnus Carlsen	(France) Alireza Firouzja	23½-7½	$175,000
10	2025 (Note: The semifinals and finals were held in 2026.)	(Norway) Magnus Carlsen	(France) Alireza Firouzja	15-12	$250,000

In the first eight editions, Nakamura only ever lost three matches in the Speed Chess Championship, all of them in the finals against Carlsen. Carlsen has only lost two matches, to Nakamura and Vachier-Lagrave.

Women's Speed Chess Championship finals
No.	Year	Winner	Runner-up	Final score	Prize fund
1	2019	(Armenia) Elina Danielian	(Russia) Valentina Gunina	15-13	$20,000
2	2020	(Ukraine) Anna Ushenina	(Russia) Alexandra Kosteniuk	14½-13½	$52,000
3	2021	(China) Hou Yifan	(India) Harika Dronavalli	15-13	$66,000
4	2022	(Russia) Kateryna Lagno	(China) Hou Yifan	15-13	$70,000
5	2023	(China) Hou Yifan	(India) Harika Dronavalli	15-11	$75,000
6	2024	(China) Ju Wenjun	(FIDE) Polina Shuvalova	12½-9½	$75,000
7	2025	(China) Ju Wenjun	(China) Hou Yifan	11½-9½	$75,000
8	2026	(United States) Alice Lee	(China) Hou Yifan	11½-9½	$75,000

From 2020 to 2022, the Women's Speed Chess Championship was jointly presented by Chess.com and FIDE. The event originally served as a qualifier to the main Speed Chess Championship, just like the Junior Speed Chess Championship, but has since been held as a standalone event.

== Events by year ==
=== 2016 ===
The inaugural event was called the Grandmaster Blitz Battle Championship. Carlsen, Nakamura, Vachier-Lagrave, World Blitz Champion Alexander Grischuk, Levon Aronian, Fabiano Caruana and Pentala Harikrishna were invited by Chess.com, while Tigran L. Petrosian entered through a qualifier event. The format for the matches was 90 minutes of 5 minute games with an increment of 2 seconds, followed by 60 minutes of 3 minute games with an increment of 2 seconds, and finally 30 minutes of 1 minute games with a 1-second increment. The first game of each segment was a Chess960 game.

The final, held on October 27, was Carlsen's last public tournament appearance before the classical World Chess Championship 2016. Carlsen won the first segment by a score of 5½-3½, and extended his lead with a 5-2 win in the next segment. Although Nakamura won the final segment by a score of 5-4, Carlsen still won the match convincingly thanks to his wins in the first two segments.

Quarterfinals
1	(Norway) Magnus Carlsen	21
8	(Armenia) Tigran L. Petrosian	4
4	(Russia) Alexander Grischuk	11½
5	(Armenia) Levon Aronian	9½
2	(United States) Hikaru Nakamura	16
7	(India) Pentala Harikrishna	9
3	(France) Maxime Vachier-Lagrave	15½
6	(United States) Fabiano Caruana	9½

Semifinals
1	(Norway) Magnus Carlsen	16
4	(Russia) Alexander Grischuk	8
2	(United States) Hikaru Nakamura	21½
3	(France) Maxime Vachier-Lagrave	10½

Finals
1	(Norway) Magnus Carlsen	14½
2	(United States) Hikaru Nakamura	10½

=== 2017 ===
Round of 16
1	(Norway) Magnus Carlsen	20½
16	(Azerbaijan) Gadir Guseinov	5½
8	(United States) Wesley So	15½
9	(Netherlands) Anish Giri	14½
5	(Russia) Alexander Grischuk	17½
12	(Hungary) Richárd Rapport	9½
4	(France) Maxime Vachier-Lagrave	19
13	(United States) Jeffery Xiong	12
3	(United States) Hikaru Nakamura	20½
14	(Russia) Sergey Grigoriants	7½
6	(United States) Fabiano Caruana	19
11	(China) Hou Yifan	9
7	(Russia) Ian Nepomniachtchi	15
10	(Armenia) Levon Aronian	13
2	(Russia) Sergey Karjakin	19
15	(Germany) Georg Meier	7

Quarterfinals
1	(Norway) Magnus Carlsen	27½
8	(United States) Wesley So	9½
5	(Russia) Alexander Grischuk	16
4	(France) Maxime Vachier-Lagrave	13
3	(United States) Hikaru Nakamura	17
6	(United States) Fabiano Caruana	10
7	(Russia) Ian Nepomniachtchi	10
2	(Russia) Sergey Karjakin	20

Semifinals
1	(Norway) Magnus Carlsen	15½
5	(Russia) Alexander Grischuk	10½
3	(United States) Hikaru Nakamura	16½
2	(Russia) Sergey Karjakin	13½

Final
1	(Norway) Magnus Carlsen	18
3	(United States) Hikaru Nakamura	9

=== 2018 ===
Round of 16
1	(United States) Hikaru Nakamura	27½
16	(China) Hou Yifan	2½
8	(France) Maxime Vachier-Lagrave	19
9	(Cuba) Leinier Domínguez	12
5	(United States) Fabiano Caruana	6½
12	(Armenia) Levon Aronian	20½
4	(Netherlands) Anish Giri	17
13	(Azerbaijan) Shakhriyar Mamedyarov	15
3	(Russia) Sergey Karjakin	11
14	(Poland) Jan-Krzysztof Duda	13
6	(Russia) Ian Nepomniachtchi	11½
11	(Russia) Alexander Grischuk	17½
7	(Armenia) Zaven Andriasian	9
10	(India) Vidit Gujrathi	16
2	(United States) Wesley So	18½
15	(China) Wei Yi	9½

Quarterfinals
1	(United States) Hikaru Nakamura	21½
8	(France) Maxime Vachier-Lagrave	13½
12	(Armenia) Levon Aronian	18
4	(Netherlands) Anish Giri	11
14	(Poland) Jan-Krzysztof Duda	14
11	(Russia) Alexander Grischuk	13
10	(India) Vidit Gujrathi	10½
2	(United States) Wesley So	16½

Semifinals
1	(United States) Hikaru Nakamura	17
12	(Armenia) Levon Aronian	12
14	(Poland) Jan-Krzysztof Duda	7
2	(United States) Wesley So	22

Final
1	(United States) Hikaru Nakamura	15½
2	(United States) Wesley So	12½

=== 2019 ===
Round of 16
1	(United States) Hikaru Nakamura	27
16	(Russia) Vladimir Dobrov	8
8	(Poland) Jan-Krzysztof Duda	14½
9	(Netherlands) Anish Giri	13½
5	(China) Ding Liren	19
12	(United States) Sam Shankland	12
4	(Russia) Ian Nepomniachtchi	27
13	(Armenia) Elina Danielian	2
3	(Armenia) Levon Aronian	13½
14	(Iran) Alireza Firouzja	12½
6	(Russia) Vladislav Artemiev	16
11	(Russia) Alexander Grischuk	9
7	(Azerbaijan) Shakhriyar Mamedyarov	12
10	(United States) Wesley So	18
2	(France) Maxime Vachier-Lagrave	21
15	(China) Wei Yi	10

Quarterfinals
1	(United States) Hikaru Nakamura	15½
8	(Poland) Jan-Krzysztof Duda	11½
5	(China) Ding Liren	12
4	(Russia) Ian Nepomniachtchi	19
3	(Armenia) Levon Aronian	9
6	(Russia) Vladislav Artemiev	16
10	(United States) Wesley So	17
2	(France) Maxime Vachier-Lagrave	15

Semifinals
1	(United States) Hikaru Nakamura	17½
4	(Russia) Ian Nepomniachtchi	14½
6	(Russia) Vladislav Artemiev	11½
10	(United States) Wesley So	17½

Final
1	(United States) Hikaru Nakamura	19½
10	(United States) Wesley So	14½

=== 2020 ===
Round of 16
1	(United States) Hikaru Nakamura	21
16	(Armenia) Haik Martirosyan	5
8	(FIDE) Alireza Firouzja	14
9	(Russia) Vladimir Fedoseev	15
4	(United States) Wesley So	18
13	(Uzbekistan) Nodirbek Abdusattorov	10
5	(Poland) Jan-Krzysztof Duda	17
12	(United States) Fabiano Caruana	9
2	(Norway) Magnus Carlsen	24
15	(Iran) Parham Maghsoodloo	5
7	(Russia) Vladislav Artemiev	15½
10	(Netherlands) Anish Giri	11½
3	(France) Maxime Vachier-Lagrave	16½
14	(India) Nihal Sarin	11½
6	(Russia) Ian Nepomniachtchi	11
11	(Armenia) Levon Aronian	14

Quarterfinals
1	(United States) Hikaru Nakamura	21½
9	(Russia) Vladimir Fedoseev	5½
4	(United States) Wesley So	16
5	(Poland) Jan-Krzysztof Duda	10
2	(Norway) Magnus Carlsen	13½
7	(Russia) Vladislav Artemiev	9½
3	(France) Maxime Vachier-Lagrave	14½
11	(Armenia) Levon Aronian	12½

Semifinals
1	(United States) Hikaru Nakamura	13½
4	(United States) Wesley So	12½
2	(Norway) Magnus Carlsen	11
3	(France) Maxime Vachier-Lagrave	13

Final
1	(United States) Hikaru Nakamura	18½
3	(France) Maxime Vachier-Lagrave	12½

=== 2021 ===
Round of 16
1	(United States) Hikaru Nakamura	22
16	(Russia) Peter Svidler	10
8	(Netherlands) Anish Giri	14
9	(Poland) Jan-Krzysztof Duda	12
4	(China) Ding Liren	14
13	(Azerbaijan) Shakhriyar Mamedyarov	12
5	(United States) Levon Aronian	15
12	(Russia) Daniil Dubov	12
2	(Hungary) Richárd Rapport	16½
15	(Russia) Alexey Sarana	14½
7	(Russia) Alexander Grischuk	10½
10	(India) Nihal Sarin	15½
3	(United States) Wesley So	18
14	(United States) Jeffery Xiong	14
6	(France) Maxime Vachier-Lagrave	12½
11	(United States) Fabiano Caruana	13½

Quarterfinals
1	(United States) Hikaru Nakamura	18½
8	(Netherlands) Anish Giri	10½
4	(China) Ding Liren	15
5	(United States) Levon Aronian	11
2	(Hungary) Richárd Rapport	9
10	(India) Nihal Sarin	18
3	(United States) Wesley So	17½
11	(United States) Fabiano Caruana	9½

Semifinals
1	(United States) Hikaru Nakamura	16½
4	(China) Ding Liren	15½
10	(India) Nihal Sarin	14
3	(United States) Wesley So	15

Final
1	(United States) Hikaru Nakamura	23
3	(United States) Wesley So	8

=== 2022 ===
Round of 16
(United States) Hikaru Nakamura	19½
David Paravyan	7½
(United States) Levon Aronian	15
(FIDE) Dmitry Andreikin	14
(China) Ding Liren	14
Alexander Grischuk	12
(India) Nihal Sarin	15
(Netherlands) Anish Giri	14
(Norway) Magnus Carlsen	23
(India) Gukesh D	7
(United States) Fabiano Caruana	14½
(India) Arjun Erigaisi	12½
(United States) Wesley So	14½
(Uzbekistan) Nodirbek Abdusattorov	12½
Ian Nepomniachtchi	11½
(France) Maxime Vachier-Lagrave	19½

Quarterfinals
(United States) Hikaru Nakamura	15½
(United States) Levon Aronian	8½
(China) Ding Liren	9
(India) Nihal Sarin	17
(Norway) Magnus Carlsen	22
(United States) Fabiano Caruana	4
(United States) Wesley So	12½
(France) Maxime Vachier-Lagrave	16½

Semifinals
(United States) Hikaru Nakamura	14½
(India) Nihal Sarin	10½
(Norway) Magnus Carlsen	17
(France) Maxime Vachier-Lagrave	9

Final
(United States) Hikaru Nakamura	14½
(Norway) Magnus Carlsen	13½

=== 2023 ===
Round of 16
(United States) Hikaru Nakamura	19
(China) Yu Yangyi	9
(United States) Fabiano Caruana	13½
(Uzbekistan) Nodirbek Abdusattorov	10½
(India) Nihal Sarin	16
(Serbia) Alexey Sarana	10
(France) Maxime Vachier-Lagrave	21½
(India) Gukesh Dommaraju	8½
(Norway) Magnus Carlsen	17½
(India) Vidit Gujrathi	8½
(FIDE) Ian Nepomniachtchi	15½
(India) Arjun Erigaisi	14½
(France) Alireza Firouzja	13½
(FIDE) Dmitry Andreikin	12½
(United States) Wesley So	15½
(United States) Levon Aronian	12½

Quarterfinals
(United States) Hikaru Nakamura	18½
(United States) Fabiano Caruana	8½
(India) Nihal Sarin	11½
(France) Maxime Vachier-Lagrave	19½
(Norway) Magnus Carlsen	20½
(FIDE) Ian Nepomniachtchi	9½
(France) Alireza Firouzja	15½
(United States) Wesley So	16½

Semifinals
(United States) Hikaru Nakamura	16½
(France) Maxime Vachier-Lagrave	11½
(Norway) Magnus Carlsen	22
(United States) Wesley So	7

Final
(United States) Hikaru Nakamura	12½
(Norway) Magnus Carlsen	13½

=== 2024 ===
Round of 16
(Norway) Magnus Carlsen	20½
(Vietnam) Tuan Minh Le	3½
(Poland) Jan-Krzysztof Duda	10
(India) Arjun Erigaisi	12
(United States) Wesley So	12
(FIDE) Denis Lazavik	10
(France) Maxime Vachier-Lagrave	11½
(United States) Hans Moke Niemann	12½
(United States) Hikaru Nakamura	14
(Mexico) Jose Martinez	8
(FIDE) Ian Nepomniachtchi	13
(Uzbekistan) Nodirbek Abdusattorov	11
(France) Alireza Firouzja	13½
(FIDE) Alexander Grischuk	10½
(United States) Fabiano Caruana	15
(Serbia) Alexey Sarana	8

Quarterfinals
(Norway) Magnus Carlsen	12
(India) Arjun Erigaisi	9
(United States) Wesley So	10
(United States) Hans Moke Niemann	13
(United States) Hikaru Nakamura	14½
(FIDE) Ian Nepomniachtchi	9½
(France) Alireza Firouzja	14½
(United States) Fabiano Caruana	8½

Semifinals
(Norway) Magnus Carlsen	17½
(United States) Hans Moke Niemann	12½
(United States) Hikaru Nakamura	11
(France) Alireza Firouzja	16

Final
(Norway) Magnus Carlsen	23½
(France) Alireza Firouzja	7½

=== 2025 ===
The matches in the first two rounds, being held from October 13 to December 4, consisted of 75 minutes of 5 minute games, 50 minutes of 3 minute games, and 25 minutes of 1 minute games. In the semifinals and finals, which were held live in London on February 7–8, 2026, the segments were 90, 60 and 30 minutes long respectively. All the games had an increment of 1 second. Eight players qualified via Titled Tuesday tournaments, while the rest were invited. The prize fund was $250,000. The top three players qualified for the 2026 Esports World Cup.

Round of 16
(Norway) Magnus Carlsen	14½
(Mexico) Jose Martinez	8½
(United States) Fabiano Caruana	11
(India) R Praggnanandhaa	10
(India) Arjun Erigaisi	9
(FIDE) Denis Lazavik	12
(United States) Hans Niemann	18
(China) Ding Liren	6
(France) Alireza Firouzja	16
(Vietnam) Lê Tuấn Minh	8
(FIDE) Ian Nepomniachtchi	17½
(Netherlands) Anish Giri	10½
(United States) Hikaru Nakamura	13½
(Vietnam) Lê Quang Liêm	11½
(United States) Wesley So	14
(Germany) Vincent Keymer	11

Quarterfinals
(Norway) Magnus Carlsen	14½
(United States) Fabiano Caruana	7½
(FIDE) Denis Lazavik	15½
(United States) Hans Niemann	9½
(France) Alireza Firouzja	19
(FIDE) Ian Nepomniachtchi	9
(United States) Hikaru Nakamura	11
(United States) Wesley So	10

Semifinals
(Norway) Magnus Carlsen	17
(FIDE) Denis Lazavik	9
(France) Alireza Firouzja	15
(United States) Hikaru Nakamura	13

Final
(Norway) Magnus Carlsen	15
(France) Alireza Firouzja	12
Consolation
(FIDE) Denis Lazavik	13½
(United States) Hikaru Nakamura	12½

=== 2026 ===
Round of 16
(Norway) Magnus Carlsen
(Iran) Sina Movahed
(Germany) Vincent Keymer
(Uzbekistan) Nodirbek Abdusattorov
(India) Nihal Sarin
(United States) Hans Moke Niemann
(Turkey) Yağız Kaan Erdoğmuş	8
(United States) Hikaru Nakamura	12
(Belarus) Denis Lazavik	12
(FIDE) Dmitry Andreikin	8
(United States) Wesley So
(India) R Praggnanandhaa
(United States) Fabiano Caruana
(Uzbekistan) Javokhir Sindarov
(FIDE) Vladislav Artemiev
(France) Alireza Firouzja

Quarterfinals
TBD
TBD
TBD
(United States) Hikaru Nakamura
(Belarus) Denis Lazavik
TBD
TBD
TBD

Semifinals
TBD
TBD
TBD
TBD

Final
TBD
TBD

== Women's Speed Chess Championship ==
=== 2021 ===
Round of 16
(Russia) Kateryna Lagno	11½
(Russia) Valentina Gunina	10½
(United States) Irina Krush	10½
(Georgia (country)) Nana Dzagnidze	13½
(Russia) Alexandra Kosteniuk	12½
(India) Harika Dronavalli	14½
(Ukraine) Anna Muzychuk	17½
(Ukraine) Iulija Osmak	4½
(China) Hou Yifan	15
(Azerbaijan) Gulnar Mammadova	6
(India) Humpy Koneru	7½
(Kazakhstan) Bibisara Assaubayeva	14½
(China) Lei Tingjie	14
(India) Vaishali Rameshbabu	6
(Bulgaria) Antoaneta Stefanova	16½
(Peru) Deysi Cori	6½

Quarterfinals
(Russia) Kateryna Lagno	14
(Georgia (country)) Nana Dzagnidze	8
(India) Harika Dronavalli	13½
(Ukraine) Anna Muzychuk	8½
(China) Hou Yifan	13½
(Kazakhstan) Bibisara Assaubayeva	9½
(China) Lei Tingjie	11
(Bulgaria) Antoaneta Stefanova	9

Semifinals
(Russia) Kateryna Lagno	13
(India) Harika Dronavalli	14
(China) Hou Yifan	11½
(China) Lei Tingjie	9½

Final
(India) Harika Dronavalli	13
(China) Hou Yifan	15

=== 2022 ===
Quarterfinals
(China) Hou Yifan	14½
(FIDE) Alexandra Kosteniuk	11½
(FIDE) Valentina Gunina	19½
(China) Tan Zhongyi	9½
(FIDE) Kateryna Lagno	14
(India) Humpy Koneru	11
(India) Vaishali Rameshbabu	13½
(India) Harika Dronavalli	11½

Semifinals
(China) Hou Yifan	14
(FIDE) Valentina Gunina	12
(FIDE) Kateryna Lagno	15½
(India) Vaishali Rameshbabu	10½

Final
(China) Hou Yifan	13
(FIDE) Kateryna Lagno	15

=== 2023 ===
Quarterfinals
(FIDE) Valentina Gunina	6½
(India) Harika Dronavalli	17½
(FIDE) Kateryna Lagno	17½
(India) Priyanka Nutakki	4½
(China) Hou Yifan	13½
(FIDE) Polina Shuvalova	7½
(India) Vaishali Rameshbabu	8
(Switzerland) Alexandra Kosteniuk	13

Semifinals
(India) Harika Dronavalli	12
(FIDE) Kateryna Lagno	10
(China) Hou Yifan	12½
(Switzerland) Alexandra Kosteniuk	9½

Final
(India) Harika Dronavalli	11
(China) Hou Yifan	15

=== 2024 ===
Round of 16
(China) Ju Wenjun	13
(Armenia) Anna Sargsyan	3
(United States) Alice Lee	10
(Spain) Sara Khadem	9
(FIDE) Kateryna Lagno	8½
(Kazakhstan) Alua Nurman	6½
(FIDE) Valentina Gunina	9½
(India) Divya Deshmukh	4½
(China) Hou Yifan	7½
(FIDE) Anastasia Bodnaruk	5½
(China) Tan Zhongyi	6
(FIDE) Polina Shuvalova	7
(Switzerland) Alexandra Kosteniuk	9½
(Estonia) Mai Narva	8½
(India) Vaishali Rameshbabu	7½
(Netherlands) Eline Roebers	6½

Quarterfinals
(China) Ju Wenjun	9½
(United States) Alice Lee	5½
(FIDE) Kateryna Lagno	9
(FIDE) Valentina Gunina	6
(China) Hou Yifan	8
(FIDE) Polina Shuvalova	9
(Switzerland) Alexandra Kosteniuk	5½
(India) Vaishali Rameshbabu	6½

Semifinals
(China) Ju Wenjun	14½
(FIDE) Kateryna Lagno	7½
(FIDE) Polina Shuvalova	11½
(India) Vaishali Rameshbabu	9½

Final
(China) Ju Wenjun	12½
(FIDE) Polina Shuvalova	9½

=== 2025 ===
Round of 16
(China) Ju Wenjun	9½
(Greece) Anastasia Avramidou	5½
(Kazakhstan) Bibisara Assaubayeva	9½
(China) Zhu Jiner	5½
(FIDE) Polina Shuvalova	7
(Georgia (country)) Meri Arabidze	6
(United States) Alice Lee	8
(India) Vaishali Rameshbabu	6
(China) Hou Yifan	11
(FIDE) Karina Ambartsumova	3
(India) Divya Deshmukh	10
(China) Lei Tingjie	3
(FIDE) Kateryna Lagno	10
(Poland) Aleksandra Maltsevskaya	5
(Switzerland) Alexandra Kosteniuk	11
(United States) Carissa Yip	4

Quarterfinals
(China) Ju Wenjun	10½
(Kazakhstan) Bibisara Assaubayeva	8½
(FIDE) Polina Shuvalova	9
(United States) Alice Lee	5
(China) Hou Yifan	10½
(India) Divya Deshmukh	9½
(FIDE) Kateryna Lagno	9
(Switzerland) Alexandra Kosteniuk	4

Semifinals
(China) Ju Wenjun	17
(FIDE) Polina Shuvalova	5
(China) Hou Yifan	12½
(FIDE) Kateryna Lagno	8½

Final
(China) Ju Wenjun	11½
(China) Hou Yifan	9½

=== 2026 ===
Round of 16
(China) Ju Wenjun	9½
(Vietnam) Le Thao Nguyen Pham	4½
(Switzerland) Alexandra Kosteniuk	7
(United States) Alice Lee	9
(FIDE) Kateryna Lagno	10½
(FIDE) Karina Ambartsumova	3½
(FIDE) Polina Shuvalova	6½
(Greece) Anastasia Avramidou	7½
(China) Hou Yifan	13½
(Germany) Dinara Wagner	2½
(Ukraine) Anna Muzychuk	8½
(India) Vaishali Rameshbabu	5½
(Kazakhstan) Bibisara Assaubayeva	10½
(Uzbekistan) Afruza Khamdamova	3½
(India) Divya Deshmukh	14
(United States) Rose Atwell	1

Quarterfinals
(China) Ju Wenjun	3½
(United States) Alice Lee	9½
(FIDE) Kateryna Lagno	4½
(Greece) Anastasia Avramidou	10½
(China) Hou Yifan	8½
(Ukraine) Anna Muzychuk	5½
(Kazakhstan) Bibisara Assaubayeva	10
(India) Divya Deshmukh	9

Semifinals
(United States) Alice Lee	19½
(Greece) Anastasia Avramidou	4½
(China) Hou Yifan	12
(Kazakhstan) Bibisara Assaubayeva	10

Final
(United States) Alice Lee	11½
(China) Hou Yifan	9½
