= Hnatyshyn =

Surname list

Hnatyshyn is the surname of the following people

- Anastasiia Hnatyshyn (born 2010), Ukrainian chess player
- Gerda Hnatyshyn (born 1935), Canadian politician, wife of Ramon
- John Hnatyshyn (1907–1967), Ukrainian-Canadian lawyer and politician
- Ramon Hnatyshyn (1934–2002), Canadian politician and Governor General, son of John

== See also ==
- Hnatyshyn Foundation Visual Arts Awards, Award for Outstanding Achievement as an Artist
