= Cairns Cup =

American chess tournament

Tournament information
- Sport: Chess
- Location: Saint Louis Chess Club
- Month played: August (since 2026)
- Established: 2019
- Tournament format: Round Robin
- Purse: $250,000 (2026)
- Broadcast: YouTube

Current champion
- (China) Tan Zhongyi (2026)

The Cairns Cup is an annual round robin chess tournament, founded in 2019, for the leading women's chess players, held in St. Louis, Missouri in the United States. The tournament was named after St Louis Chess Club co-founder and World Chess Hall of Fame member Dr Jeanne Cairns Sinquefield.

== Venue ==
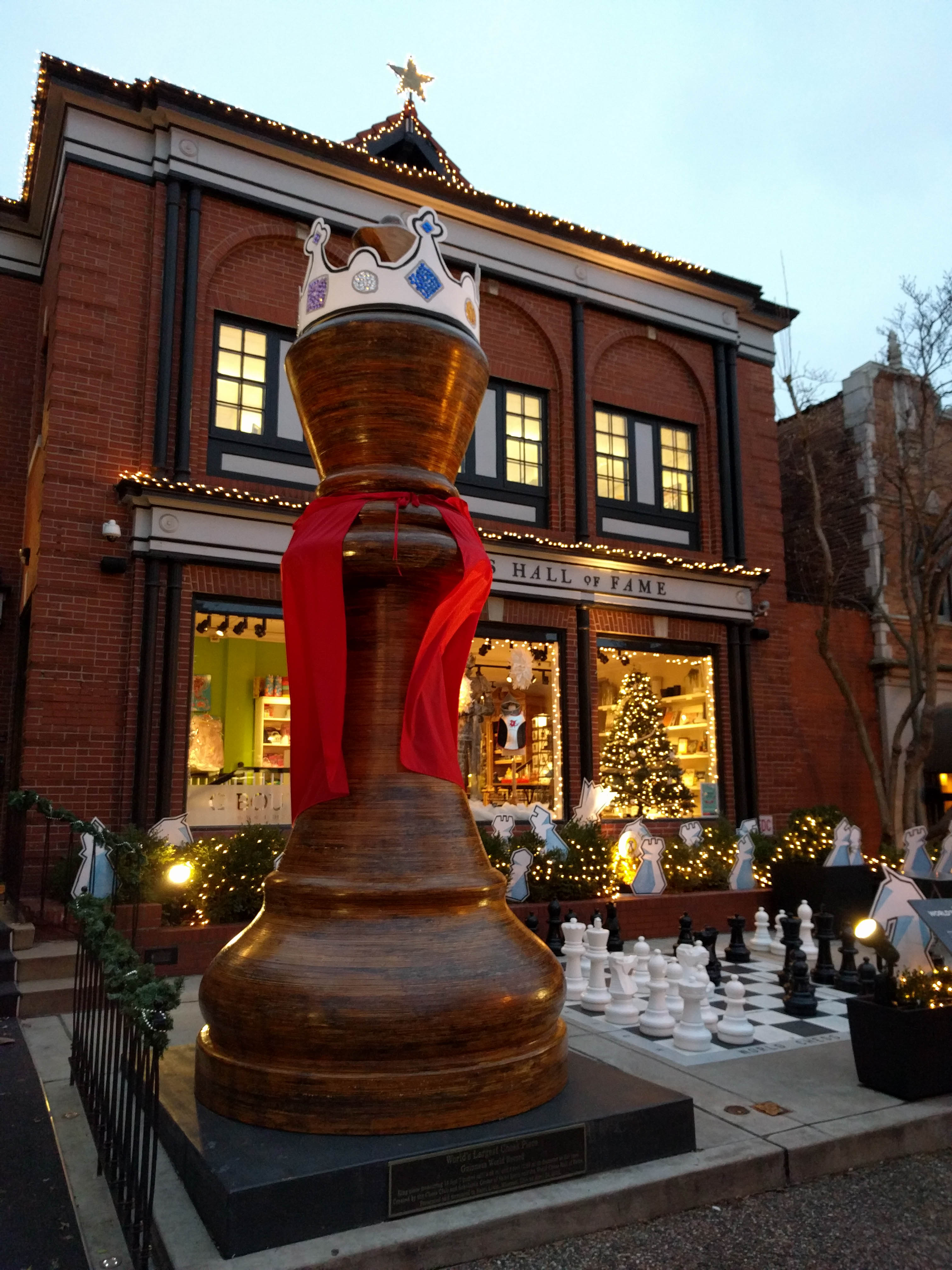
St Louis Chess Club in 2015

The Cairns Cup is hosted at the Saint Louis Chess Club located in the Central West End in St. Louis, Missouri, United States. The venue was funded by multi-millionaire Rex Sinquefield, and opened on July 17, 2008.

== Winners ==
#	Year	Winner(s)
1	2019	Valentina Gunina (Russia)
2	2020	Koneru Humpy (India)
–	2022	Cancelled due to the COVID-19 pandemic
3	2023	Anna Zatonskih (United States)
4	2024	Tan Zhongyi (China)
5	2025	Carissa Yip (United States)
6	2026	Tan Zhongyi (China)

== 2019 ==
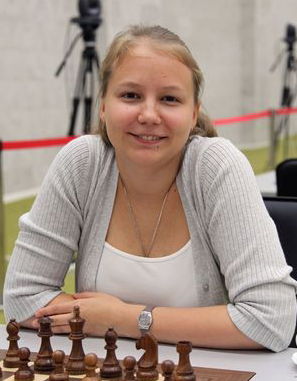
Valentina Gunina, victor of the first Cairns Cup in 2019

The 2019 Cairns Cup was the inaugural event hosted in February 2019. The event featured 10 players, in a round-robin format. The prize fund for the event was $150,000. The event was won by Valentina Gunina of Russia.

1st Cairns Cup, February 5–17 St. Louis, Missouri, United States, Category X (2478.1)
	Player	Rating	1	2	3	4	5	6	7	8	9	10	Points	TB	Prize Money
1	GM Valentina Gunina (Russia)	2501		½	½	1	½	½	1	1	1	1	7		$40,000
2	GM Alexandra Kosteniuk (Russia)	2532	½		½	½	½	1	½	1	1	1	6½		$30,000
3	GM Irina Krush (United States)	2435	½	½		1	1	1	1	0	0	½	5½		$20,000
4	GM Nana Dzagnidze (Georgia)	2513	0	½	0		½	½	1	1	1	½	5		$15,000
5	GM Harika Dronavalli (India)	2471	½	½	0	½		1	½	½	½	½	4½		$9,500
6	IM Zhansaya Abdumalik (Kazakhstan)	2468	½	0	0	½	0		1	½	1	1	4½		$9,500
7	IM Anna Zatonskih (United States)	2428	0	½	0	0	½	0		1	1	½	3½		$8,000
8	GM Marie Sebag (France)	2476	0	0	1	0	½	½	0		½	½	3		$6,500
9	GM Bela Khotenashvili (Georgia)	2491	0	0	1	0	½	0	0	½		1	3		$6,500
10	IM Elisabeth Pähtz (Germany)	2466	0	0	½	½	½	0	½	½	0		2½		$5,000

== 2020 ==
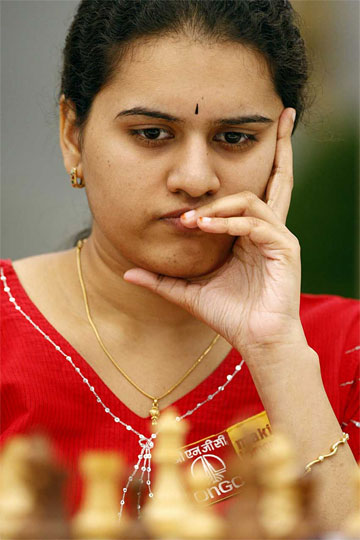
Koneru Humpy won her first Cairns Cup title in 2020.

The second edition of the Cairns Cup was held in February 2020. The prize fund was increased to $180,000. 2019 winner, Valentina Gunina, returned to defend her title, ultimately finishing 10th. Humpy Koneru of India won the title.

2nd Cairns Cup, February 7–17 St. Louis, Missouri, United States, Category XI (2509.9)
	Player	Rating	1	2	3	4	5	6	7	8	9	10	Points	TB	Prize Money
1	GM Koneru Humpy (India)	2580		½	1	0	½	½	½	1	1	1	6		$45,000
2	GM Ju Wenjun (China)	2583	½		1	½	½	1	½	0	½	1	5½		$35,000
3	GM Mariya Muzychuk (Ukraine)	2552	0	0		1	0	½	½	1	1	1	5		$22,500
4	GM Alexandra Kosteniuk (Russia)	2504	1	½	0		½	½	½	½	½	1	5		$22,500
5	GM Harika Dronavalli (India)	2518	½	½	1	½		½	½	½	½	0	4½		$12,500
6	GM Kateryna Lagno (Russia)	2552	½	0	½	½	½		½	½	½	0	4½		$12,500
7	GM Irina Krush (United States)	2422	½	½	½	½	½	½		0	1	0	4		$8,000
8	IM Carissa Yip (United States)	2412	0	1	0	½	½	0	1		0	1	4		$8,000
9	GM Nana Dzagnidze (Georgia)	2515	0	½	0	½	½	½	0	1		1	4		$8,000
10	GM Valentina Gunina (Russia)	2461	0	0	0	0	1	½	1	0	0		2½		$6,000

== 2023 ==
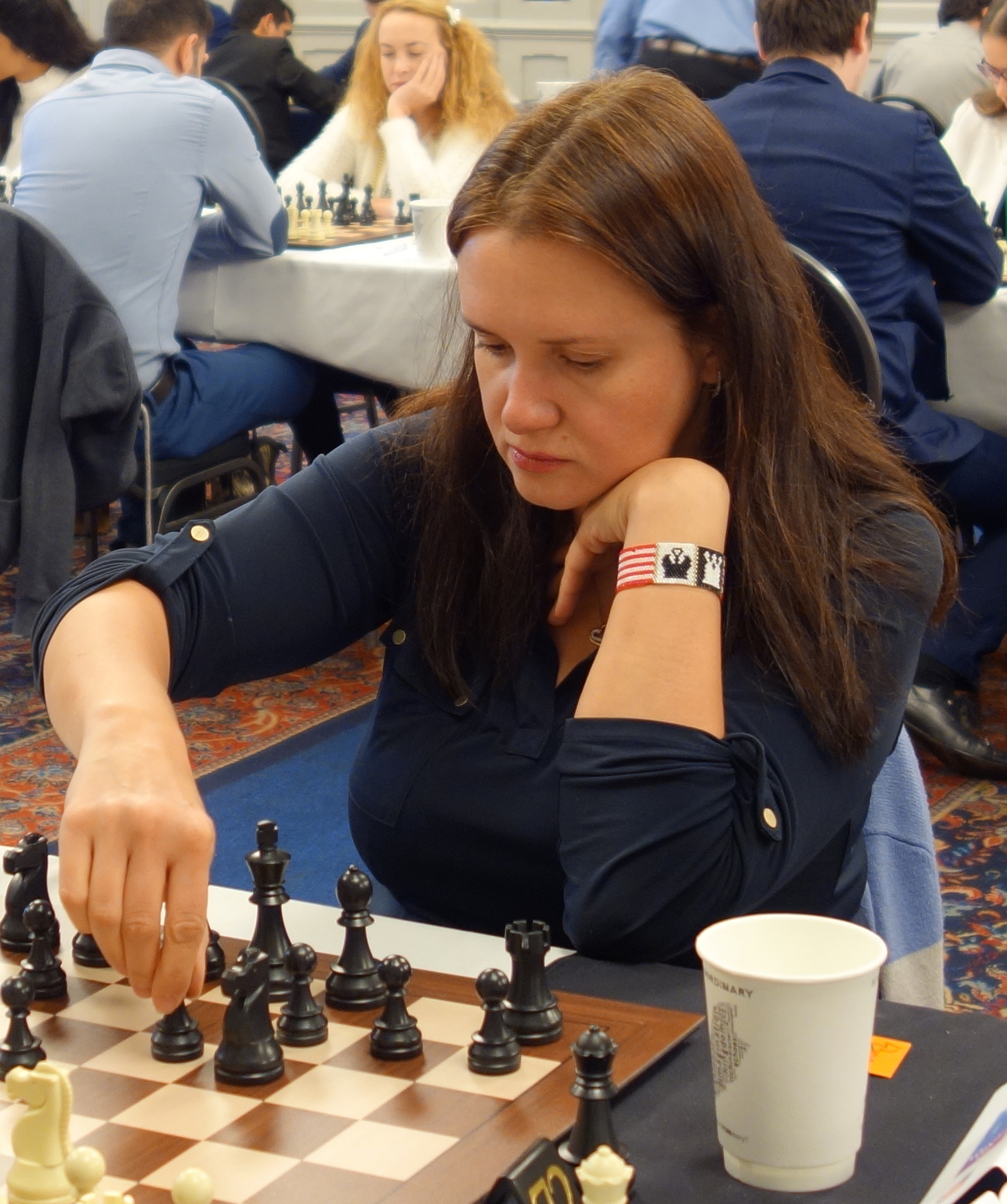
Anna Zatonskih won the third Cairns Cup in 2023.

The Cairns Cup returned in 2023 following a two year hiatus. Only nine players' results were counted in the tournament, as 2020 champion Humpy Koneru withdrew shortly before the halfway point. The tournament was won by Anna Zatonskih representing the United States. Alexandra Kosteniuk finished in 2nd, her third top-3 finish in the Cairns Cup, representing Switzerland for the first time. Irina Krush and Bella Khotenashvili shared third place.

3rd Cairns Cup, June 3–13 St. Louis, Missouri, United States, Category X (2478.2)
	Player	Rating	1	2	3	4	5	6	7	8	9	10	Points	TB	Prize Money
1	IM Anna Zatonskih (United States)	2327		1	½	1	½	½	½	1	1	–	6		$45,000
2	GM Alexandra Kosteniuk (Switzerland)	2535	0		1	1	0	1	1	½	½	~~1~~	5		$35,000
3	GM Irina Krush (United States)	2478	½	0		0	1	1	½	½	1	–	4½		$25,500
4	GM Bella Khotenashvili (Georgia)	2436	0	0	1		1	½	1	0	1	~~½~~	4½		$25,500
5	GM Nana Dzagnidze (Georgia)	2513	½	1	0	0		½	0	1	1	~~1~~	4		$15,000
6	GM Harika Dronavalli (India)	2501	½	0	0	½	½		1	½	½	~~½~~	3½		$9,500
7	GM Elisabeth Pähtz (Germany)	2479	½	0	½	0	1	0		1	½	–	3½		$9,500
8	IM Gunay Mammadzada (Azerbaijan)	2449	0	½	½	1	0	½	0		½	–	3		$8,000
9	GM Zhansaya Abdumalik (Kazakhstan)	2497	0	½	0	0	0	½	½	½		–	2		$7,000
10	GM Koneru Humpy (India)	2567	–	~~0~~	–	~~½~~	~~0~~	~~½~~	–	–	–		—N/a	–	–

== 2024 ==
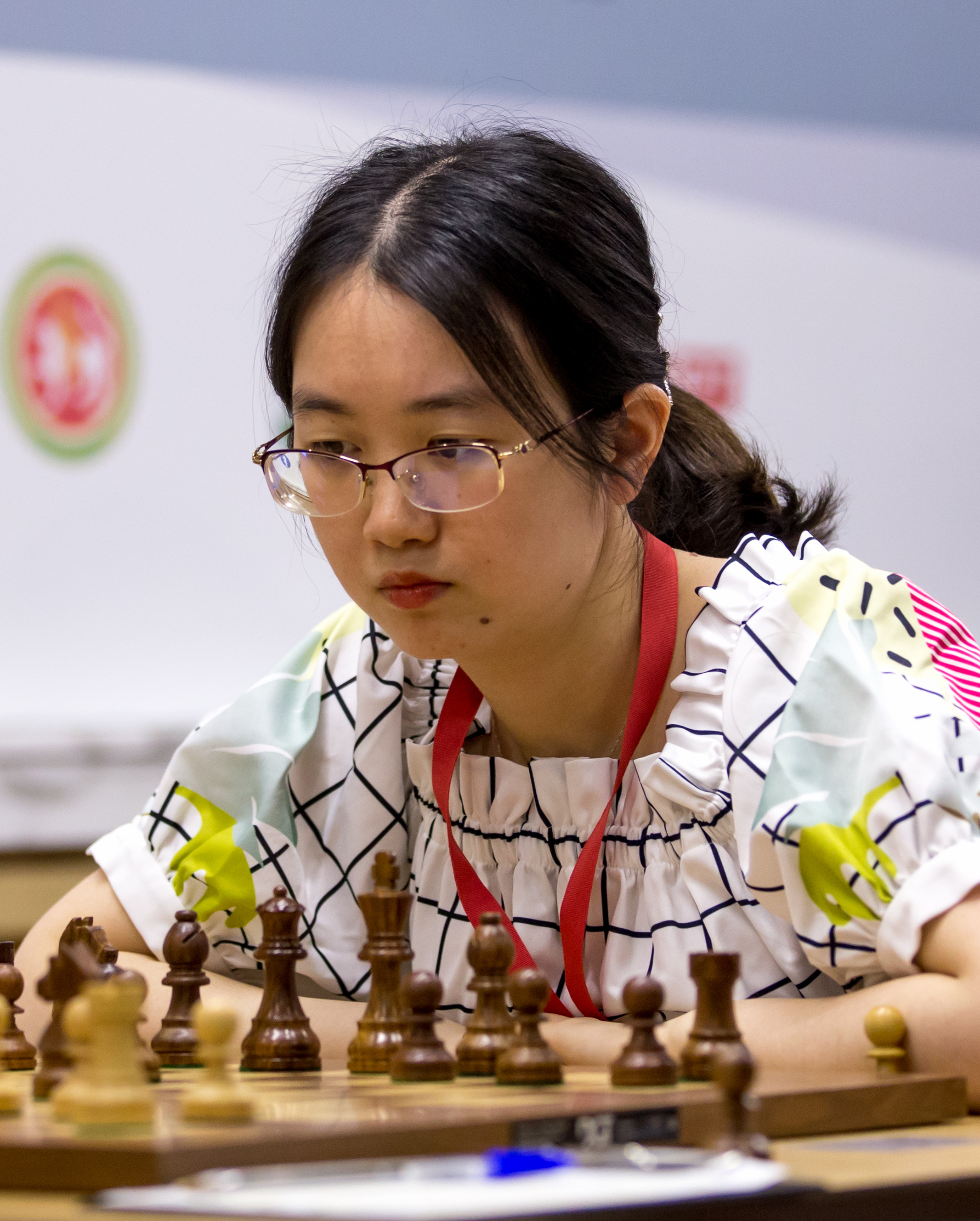
Tan Zhongyi was the 2024 Cairns Cup winner

The 2024 Cairns Cup began on June 12. In May, the ten players for the tournament were confirmed, including 2023 champion Anna Zatonskih. 2024 will also be the first time Spain has had a representative in the tournament. The chief arbiter is Australian chess player Anastasia Sorokina. The prize fund for 2024 has risen to $200,000.

Prior to the first official day of play, the players competed in an Ultimate Moves battle of team chess, with players rotating in and out of blitz games. Team A, featuring Tan, Anna Muzychuk, Harika, Kosteniuk, Lee, and Zatonskih, won the ten-game match 5½-1½. Georgian GM Nona Gaprindashvili joined "Team B" as a special tournament guest.

Day one of the event saw former World Champions Tan Zhongyi, Mariya Muzychuk, and Alexandra Kosteniuk all record victories. Harika Dronavalli and Nana Dzagnidze played out a 126 move draw. Day two saw victories for Dzagnidze and Dronavalli, taking them both to joint first alongside Zhongi and Mariya Muzkchuk. In round three, all matches were drawn aside Swiss GM Alexandra Kosteniuk taking victory over Nana Dzagnidze. This saw Kosteniuk join the leaders on 2, with Dzagnidze dropping back to T-5 alongside Anna Muzychuk and Irina Krush on a total score of 1½. On the fourth day, Tan Zhongyi's 20 move victory over defending champion Anna Zatonskih took her into the overall lead on a score of 3. Both Drovanelli and Mariya Muzychuk drew, whilst Kosteniuk lost to Alice Lee. Day five saw all matches end in draws, the leaderboard remaining the same as each player added a half point to their totals.

Following a rest day, the players returned for round six, where Kosteniuk scored a decisive victory over Mariya Muzychuk taking her to an overall score of 3½, a half point behind sole leader Zhongyi. Round seven saw more close games, whilst Zhongyi took the win against Pähtz, retaining her lead, a further four players are also in contention for victory. Kosteniuk won again, and Mariya Muzychuk and Nana Dzagnidze also scored wins over Alice Lee and Irina Krush respectively. In round eight, Anna Muzychuk took a timely victory against Kosteniuk taking her to a five-way tie for second place on a score of 4½. Lee beat Zatonskih, leaving the latter at the bottom of the leaderboard with 1½ points total. In round nine, Zhongyi completed a draw against Kosteniuk to secure victory of the 2024 Cairns Cup with a total score of 6. Anna Muzychuk beat Alice Lee to take 2nd place, whilst 3rd was a four way tie between Kosteniuk, Drovanalli, Mariya Muzychuk and Nana Dzaginze. Alice Lee and Irina Krush were tied for 7th place at 4 points. Elisabeth Pähtz and Anna Zatonskih finished 9th place and 10th place, respectively.

4th Cairns Cup, June 13–22 St. Louis, Missouri, United States, Category IX (2463.6)
	Player	Rating	1	2	3	4	5	6	7	8	9	10	Points	TB	Prize Money
1	GM Tan Zhongyi (China)	2540		½	½	½	½	½	½	1	1	1	6		$50,000
2	GM Anna Muzychuk (Ukraine)	2505	½		½	½	1	½	½	1	½	½	5½		$40,000
3	GM Mariya Muzychuk (Ukraine)	2510	½	½		½	0	½	½	1	½	1	5		$19,000
4	GM Nana Dzagnidze (Georgia)	2506	½	½	½		0	½	1	½	½	1	5		$19,000
5	GM Alexandra Kosteniuk (Switzerland)	2501	½	0	1	1		0	½	0	1	1	5		$19,000
6	GM Harika Dronavalli (India)	2503	½	½	½	½	1		½	½	½	½	5		$19,000
7	GM Irina Krush (United States)	2415	½	½	½	0	½	½		½	½	½	4		$9,500
8	IM Alice Lee (United States)	2368	0	0	0	½	1	½	½		½	1	4		$9,500
9	GM Elisabeth Pähtz (Germany)	2457	0	½	½	½	0	½	½	½		½	3½		$8,000
10	IM Anna Zatonskih (United States)	2331	0	½	0	0	0	½	½	0	½		2		$7,000

== 2025 ==
The 2025 Cairns Cup took place between June 10 and June 20, 2025. The total prize fund was $250,000. The chief arbiter for 2025 was Maya Myers, supported by the returning deputy arbiter Anastasia Sorokina. The tournament was won by American, Carissa Yip ahead of fellow American Alice Lee. India's Harika Dronavalli placed third.

5th Cairns Cup, June 10–20 St. Louis, Missouri, United States, Category X (2481.9)
	Player	Rating	1	2	3	4	5	6	7	8	9	10	Points	TB	Prize Money
1	IM Carissa Yip (United States)	2431		½	0	1	1	½	1	0	1	1	6		$60,000
2	IM Alice Lee (United States)	2389	½		½	½	0	1	½	1	½	1	5½		$50,000
3	GM Harika Dronavalli (India)	2483	1	½		0	½	½	1	½	½	½	5		$40,000
4	GM Humpy Koneru (India)	2543	0	½	1		1	½	1	0	½	0	4½	20.75	$19,000
5	GM Bibisara Assaubayeva (Kazakhstan)	2509	0	1	½	0		½	0	1	½	1	4½	19.00	$19,000
6	IM Alina Kashlinskaya (Poland)	2459	½	0	½	½	½		0	1	1	½	4½	19.00	$19,000
7	GM Nana Dzagnidze (Georgia)	2505	0	½	0	0	1	1		½	½	1	4½	18.50	$19,000
8	GM Mariya Muzychuk (Ukraine)	2492	1	0	½	1	0	0	½		½	½	4		$9,000
9	GM Tan Zhongyi (China)	2546	0	½	½	½	½	0	½	½		½	3½		$8,000
10	GM Nino Batsiashvili (Georgia)	2462	0	0	½	1	0	½	0	½	½		3		$7,000

== 2026 ==
The 2026 Cairns Cup took place between August 10 and August 20. The total prize fund was $250,000. The tournament was won by the former Women's World Champion, Tan Zhongyi ahead of Alice Lee.

6th Cairns Cup, August 10–20 St. Louis, Missouri, United States, Category X (2491.6)
	Player	Rating	1	2	3	4	5	6	7	8	9	10	Points	TB	Prize Money	Circuit
1	GM Tan Zhongyi (China)	2520		½	1	1	½	1	0	1	½	1	6½		$65,000	26.58
2	IM Alice Lee (United States)	2430	½		½	½	½	1	0	1	1	1	6		$50,000	19.33
3	GM Bibisara Assaubayeva (Kazakhstan)	2538	0	½		½	½	½	1	½	1	½	5		$35,000	8.46
4	IM Carissa Yip (United States)	2459	0	½	½		½	½	1	½	1	½	5		$35,000	8.46
5	GM Anna Muzychuk (Ukraine)	2529	½	½	½	½		½	½	½	½	½	4½		$13,667	
6	GM Divya Deshmukh (India)	2490	0	0	½	½	½		½	½	1	1	4½		$13,667	
7	IM Stavroula Tsolakidou (Greece)	2433	1	1	0	0	½	½		½	½	½	4½		$13,667	
8	GM Koneru Humpy (India)	2524	0	0	½	½	½	½	½		½	½	3½		$9,000	
9	GM Alexandra Kosteniuk (Switzerland)	2504	½	0	0	0	½	0	½	½		1	3		$8,000	
10	GM Vaishali Rameshbabu (India)	2489	0	0	½	½	½	0	½	½	0		2½		$7,000	
