= Avramidou =

Avramidou is a surname. Notable people with the surname include:

- Alkisti Avramidou (born 1988), Greek water polo player
- Anastasia Avramidou (born 2000), Greek chess master
- Elisabet Avramidou Granlund (born 1990), Swedish-Greek actress, know professionally as Elli AvrRa
