= Anastasia Sorokina =

Belarusian-Australian chess player (born 1980)

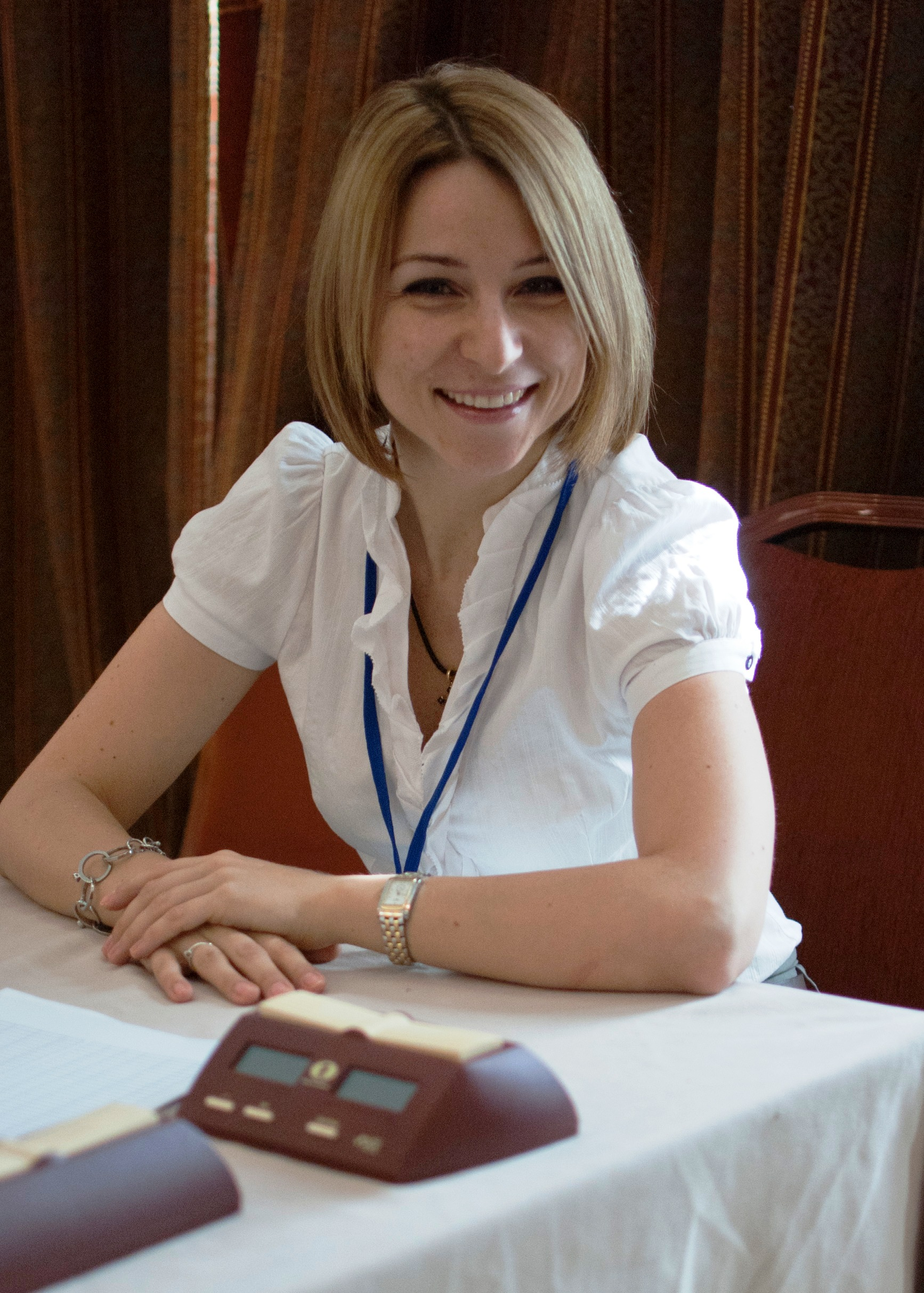
- Sorokina in 2012

Personal information
- Born: 26 January 1980 (age 46) Minsk, Byelorussian SSR, Soviet Union

Chess career
- Country: Belarus (until 2003; 2017–2022); Australia (2003–2017; since 2022)
- Title: Woman International Master (2001)
- FIDE rating: 2194 (October 2007)
- Peak rating: 2230 (April 2005)

Anastasia Sorokina (Belarusian: Анастасія Сарокіна; born 26 January 1980 in Minsk, Soviet Union) is an Australian (ex-Belarusian) chess player, arbiter, organiser and official. She received the FIDE title of Woman International Master (WIM) in 2001 and is an International Arbiter (2002), FIDE Trainer (2005) and International Organiser (2018). She was elected as FIDE Vice-president (2018–2022) in the World Chess Federation and she is Chairwoman of the FIDE Commission for Women's Chess since 2022.

== Chess career ==
Sorokina is a Women International Master (WIM) since 2001. She won the Belarus Girls' Chess Championship in her age group eight times (in 1992, 1993, 1994, 1995, 1996, 1997, 1998, and 2000). She came second in the Belarus Women's Chess Championship in 1998.

Sorokina represented Belarus in two Chess Olympiads in Yerevan 1996, and Elista 1998. She represented Australia in the 36th Chess Olympiad in Calvià 2004. Her best result was in 1998 when she scored 5.5/9 for Belarus on the reserve board.

She has been an arbiter for the Chess Olympiads in Bled 2002, Istanbul 2012, Tromsø 2014, Baku 2016 and a number of FIDE Grand Prix 2012–13 events, the as well as several other major FIDE tournaments. She has also worked as Chief and Deputy Chief Arbiter in some of the most famous events such as London Chess Classic, Norway Chess and Cairns Cup. She was also Chief Arbiter in the Women's World Chess Championship in 2016, 2018 & 2023 and in the Candidates Tournament 2022.

From 2017 to 2020 she headed the Belarusian Chess Federation. In this short time, much has been done to develop and popularize chess giving a new life to the national chess championships and attracting major international events such as the European Individual Chess Championship and the first ever World Rapid & Blitz Cadet Chess Championships which have evolved to an event with massive participation. At the same time, the Youth Olympic Games, Belarus team shared the prestigious 3-4th place with the Chinese team. In the fall of 2018, Anastasia Sorokina was elected to the post of FIDE Vice President, and Belarus won the right to host the Chess Olympiad in Minsk in 2022.

In the most recent years, she is Chair of the FIDE Commission for Women's Chess and has initiated many important FIDE Social Projects "Infinite Chess" (Chess for kids with autism spectrum disorder) and "Chess for Protection: Girls Club" chess for refugees. For both projects, special programs were developed under Sorokina's leadership and she is currently also working in social corporate responsibility field and gender equality.

== Personal life ==
Sorohina is the niece of Viktor Kupreichik, a Belarusian chess grandmaster. She worked as a chess coach in Australia for several years, starting in 2003. She is married and has one daughter.

== Political exile ==
Following vote-rigging allegations against Alexander Lukashenko in the 2020 Belarusian presidential election and the ensuing state violence against civilian protesters, Sorokina openly expressed opposition to the Lukashenko regime to the chess community and international media. Due to those statements and her public appearance in independent media, a criminal prosecution was initiated against Sorokina in Belarus. She was forced to leave the country with her daughter and husband.
