= Alice Lee (chess player) =

American chess player (born 2009)

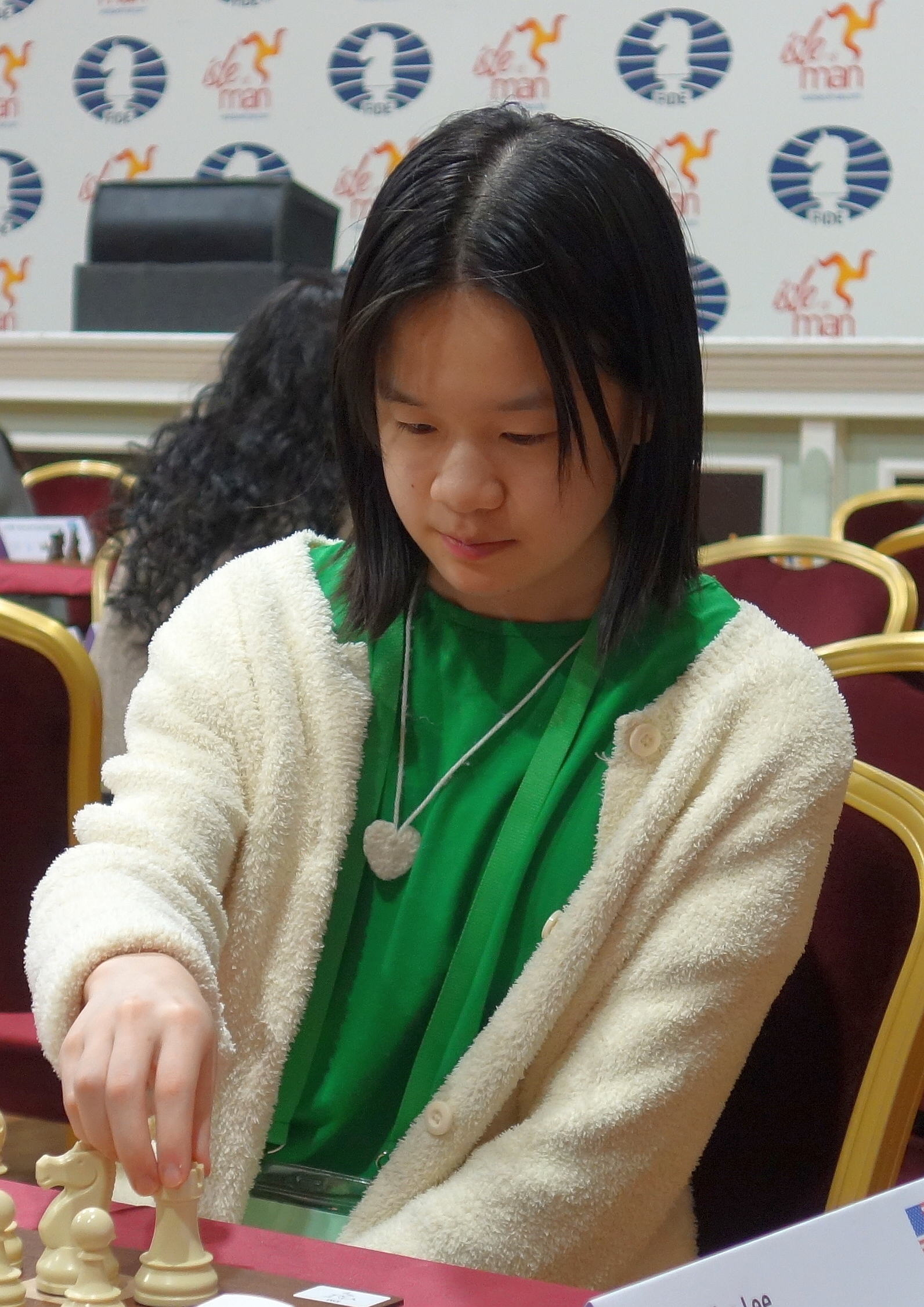
- Lee in 2023

Personal information
- Born: October 13, 2009 (age 17) Minneapolis, Minnesota, U.S.

Chess career
- Country: United States
- Title: International Master (2023)
- FIDE rating: 2474 (November 2026)
- Peak rating: 2474 (November 2026)
- Peak ranking: World #14 (Women; November 2026)

Alice Teresa Lee (born October 13, 2009) is an American chess player who holds the International Master (IM) title and has earned one Grandmaster (GM) norm. She is the youngest American female, and the third youngest female worldwide, to achieve the IM title. Her tournament accomplishments include being an Olympiad gold medalist, a three-time Women’s American Cup champion, and the 2026 international Women’s Speed Chess champion. In November 2026, Lee was ranked the No. 1 woman in the U.S. and No. 14 in the world.

== Early career ==
Alice Lee started playing chess at age 6 in her school’s chess club, where her older brother was already a member.

By age 8, she had already earned the title of US Chess Expert, and by age 10, she had become a US Chess National Master (NM). She also had early success competing well above her age group: at age 9, she won the under-18 section of the 2019 National Girls Championships, and at age 11, she won the under-18 girls section of the 2021 North American Youth Championships.

== World Youth Championships ==
Lee is a three-time gold medalist at the World Youth Championships (under-10 girls section in 2019; under-12 girls section in 2020; under-12 girls section in 2021).

== U.S. Women's Championships ==
Lee began competing in the U.S. Women's Championship in 2022 at age 12. She finished in clear third place in both 2023 and 2024, and clear second place in 2026.

== Women's American Cup ==
Lee has set multiple records at Women's American Cup, becoming both the youngest participant and the youngest champion in the tournament’s history. She won the title in 2024, 2025, and 2026, and also finished as runner-up twice.

At age 12, she placed second at the 2022 Women’s American Cup, recording a series of upset victories. The following year, she again finished second at the 2023 Women’s American Cup.

At age 14, she won the 2024 Women’s American Cup, earning the $40,000 first prize after defeating GM Irina Krush in the Grand Final. Her victory places her alongside Bobby Fischer and Irina Krush as one of the youngest players to win a major chess title in the United States.

She successfully defended the title in 2025, winning every match she played and defeating WGM Tatev Abrahamyan in the Grand Final for the $49,000 first prize. In 2026, she captured her third consecutive title by defeating IM Carissa Yip in the rapid Grand Final, earning another $49,000 first prize.

== U.S. Junior Championships ==
Lee is a two-time U.S. Girls' Junior champion and holds the record as the tournament's youngest winner. She first competed in the U.S. Girls' Junior Championship at age 10. At age 13, she won the 2023 U.S. Girls' Junior Championship with a score of 7.5/9, becoming the youngest champion in the tournament's history. At age 14, she successfully defended her title at the 2024 U.S. Girls' Junior Championship.

She began competing in the open U.S. Junior Championship at age 16. In her 2026 debut, she scored 4.5/9, the highest score by a female participant since the Saint Louis Chess Club began hosting the event in 2010; she also recorded a performance rating of 2511, the highest ever recorded by a female participant in the tournament's history.

== International team competitions ==
Lee began representing the USA Women's Team in international competitions at age 13. She has won four medals: three from the Chess Olympiads (an individual gold, an individual silver, and a team bronze) and one from the World Women's Team Championship (an individual gold).

At age 13, she played on the top board for Team USA at the 2023 World Women's Team Championship, where she won the individual gold medal with a score of 7.5/11.

At age 14, she competed in the 45th FIDE Chess Olympiad in Budapest, helping Team USA secure its first medal in 16 years by winning the bronze. With a score of 8/10, she also earned the individual silver medal on board 4.

At age 16, she competed in the 46th FIDE Chess Olympiad in Samarkand. She won the individual gold medal on board 2 with a score of 8.5/10, recording a performance rating of 2572.

== Online competitions ==
In March 2026, Lee became the first female player to surpass a 3000 rating on Chess.com, reaching 3002 in bullet chess.

She began competing in the international Women's Speed Chess Championship (WSCC) at age 14. She is the youngest main-event participant, the youngest champion, and the first American to win the tournament.

In the 2024 and 2025 editions of the WSCC, she defeated IM Sara Khadem and GM Vaishali Rameshbabu, respectively, in the round of 16 to reach the quarterfinals.

In the 2026 WSCC, she defeated former Women's World Champion GM Alexandra Kosteniuk 9–7 in the round of 16. She then defeated five-time and reigning Women's World Champion GM Ju Wenjun 9.5–3.5 in the quarterfinals. In the semifinals, she defeated FM Anastasia Avramidou 19.5–4.5. In the final, she defeated four-time Women's World Champion Hou Yifan 11.5–9.5 to win the title. At age 16, she became the youngest champion in the tournament's history, breaking the previous record held by Hou Yifan at age 27.

== Other notable tournaments ==
Lee is the youngest participant in the history of the Cairns Cup, one of the world's strongest women's super-tournaments, and has finished runner-up twice. At age 14, she made her debut in the 2024 Cairns Cup and scored 4/9. At age 15, she finished clear second in the 2025 Cairns Cup with a score of 5.5/9 and a performance rating of 2572, earning $50,000 in prize money and finishing half a point short of her first GM norm. At age 16, she again finished clear second in the 2026 Cairns Cup with a score of 6/9 and a performance rating of 2623, earning $50,000 in prize money and securing her first GM norm.

== FIDE titles and ratings ==
Lee is the youngest American female to achieve the IM title (at 13 years and 7 months old), breaking the previous record held by Carissa Yip (at 16 years and 1 month old). Worldwide, she is one of three female players to earn the IM title at age 13, joining GMs Judit Polgár and Kateryna Lagno.

At age 12, she earned her first IM norm and first Woman Grandmaster (WGM) norm at the 2022 Southwest Class Championships. At age 13, she earned a second IM norm and a second WGM norm at the 2023 1000GM St. Louis IM Norm Tournament. Later that year, she crossed the 2400 live rating mark during the 2023 1000GM NYC IM Norm Tournament, fulfilling the rating requirement for the IM title. She then earned her final IM norm and final WGM norm at the 2023 Canadian Transnational Championship, thereby qualifying for both the IM and WGM titles.

At age 16, she earned her first GM norm at the 2026 Cairns Cup, making her the fifth-youngest female player to earn a GM norm.

She reached a peak FIDE rating of 2474 in November 2026. She reached a peak women's world ranking of No. 14 in November 2026. She also became the top-ranked woman in the U.S. in November 2026 and the world's top-ranked girl (U20) in October 2026.

== Notable games ==
At the 2022 Southwest Class Championships, Lee defeated IM Viktor Gazik (2543) to clinch her first IM and WGM norms.

At the 2023 Pro Chess League, she defeated GM Matthias Bluebaum (2661) (Berlin Bears) and GM Bogdan-Daniel Deac (2700) (Croatia Bulldogs) to help St. Louis Arch Bishops reach the playoffs; in the quarterfinals, she drew GM Hikaru Nakamura (2775) (Gotham Knights).

At the 2023 Canadian Transnational Championship, she defeated two GMs, including GM Arturs Neiksans (2605), and drew four other GMs. A performance rating of 2531 secured her final IM and WGM norms.

At the 2024 Women's American Cup, she defeated GM Irina Krush in the Grand Final to become one of the youngest players to win a major chess title in the United States.

At the 2026 Cairns Cup, she defeated former Women's World Champion GM Alexandra Kosteniuk in round 1, reigning Women's World Cup champion GM Divya Deshmukh in round 2, former Women's World Championship challenger GM Humpy Koneru in round 6, and current Women's World Championship challenger GM Vaishali Rameshbabu in round 8. A performance rating of 2623 secured her first GM norm.

At the 2026 Women's Speed Chess Championship, she defeated five-time and reigning Women's World Champion GM Ju Wenjun 9.5–3.5 in the quarterfinals, and four-time Women's World Champion GM Hou Yifan 11.5–9.5 in the final to win the title.

== Other chess activities and awards ==
In July 2023, Lee was interviewed by Good Morning America after becoming the youngest American female IM.

As a ChessKid.com ambassador, she took part in various ChessKid.com and Chess.com activities, including hosting the Alice's Pawn Palace show, playing online matches with other junior players, competing in the Team Chess Battle, and participating in Kids vs. Stars exhibitions in which she defeated GM Anish Giri.

In May 2024, the Minnesota Senate passed a resolution to congratulate Alice Lee on her American Cup victory and extraordinary chess career.

== Education ==
Lee attended Mounds View High School in Arden Hills, Minnesota. She has been accepted to Yale University and is taking a gap year before enrolling, during which she plans to focus on chess and pursue the GM title.
