= 2013 European Individual Chess Championship =

The European Individual Chess Championship 2013 was a chess 11-round Swiss-system tournament, played between 4 and 17 May 2013, in Legnica, Poland. Ukrainian grandmaster Alexander Moiseenko won the gold medal after tie break.

== Format ==
Players had 90 minutes for their first 40 moves followed by 30 minutes for the rest of the game with an additional increment of 30 seconds per move from move one.

The tie breaks were calculated as follows:

1. Average Rating cut-1, the highest number wins;
2. Buchholz cut-1, the highest number wins;
3. Buchholz, the highest number wins;
4. Number of wins, the highest number wins.

The best 23 players qualified for the Chess World Cup 2013.

== Participants ==
The players were nominated by their respective national chess federations. The 10 highest ranked participants with their May 2013 rating (Continent Rank Europe position) were:

1. Dmitry Jakovenko (Russia), 2731 (15)
2. Evgeny Tomashevsky (Russia), 2719 (20)
3. Maxime Vachier-Lagrave (France), 2718 (21)
4. Ian Nepomniachtchi (Russia), 2710 (24)
5. Alexander Areshchenko (Ukraine), 2709
6. David Navara (Czechoslovakia), 2706
7. Vladimir Akopian (Armenia), 2704
8. Pavel Eljanov (Ukraine), 2702
9. Ivan Cheparinov (Bulgaria), 2700 (35)
10. Alexander Moiseenko (Ukraine), 2698

All of the above are grandmasters.

== Winners ==
Ten players finished on 8/11 points to tie for first place. After applying tie-breaks, the following players were awarded the gold, silver and bronze medal positions;

1. Alexander Moiseenko (Ukraine)
2. Evgeny Alekseev (Russia)
3. Evgeny Romanov (Russia)
