= Karina Ambartsumova =

Russian chess player (born 1989)

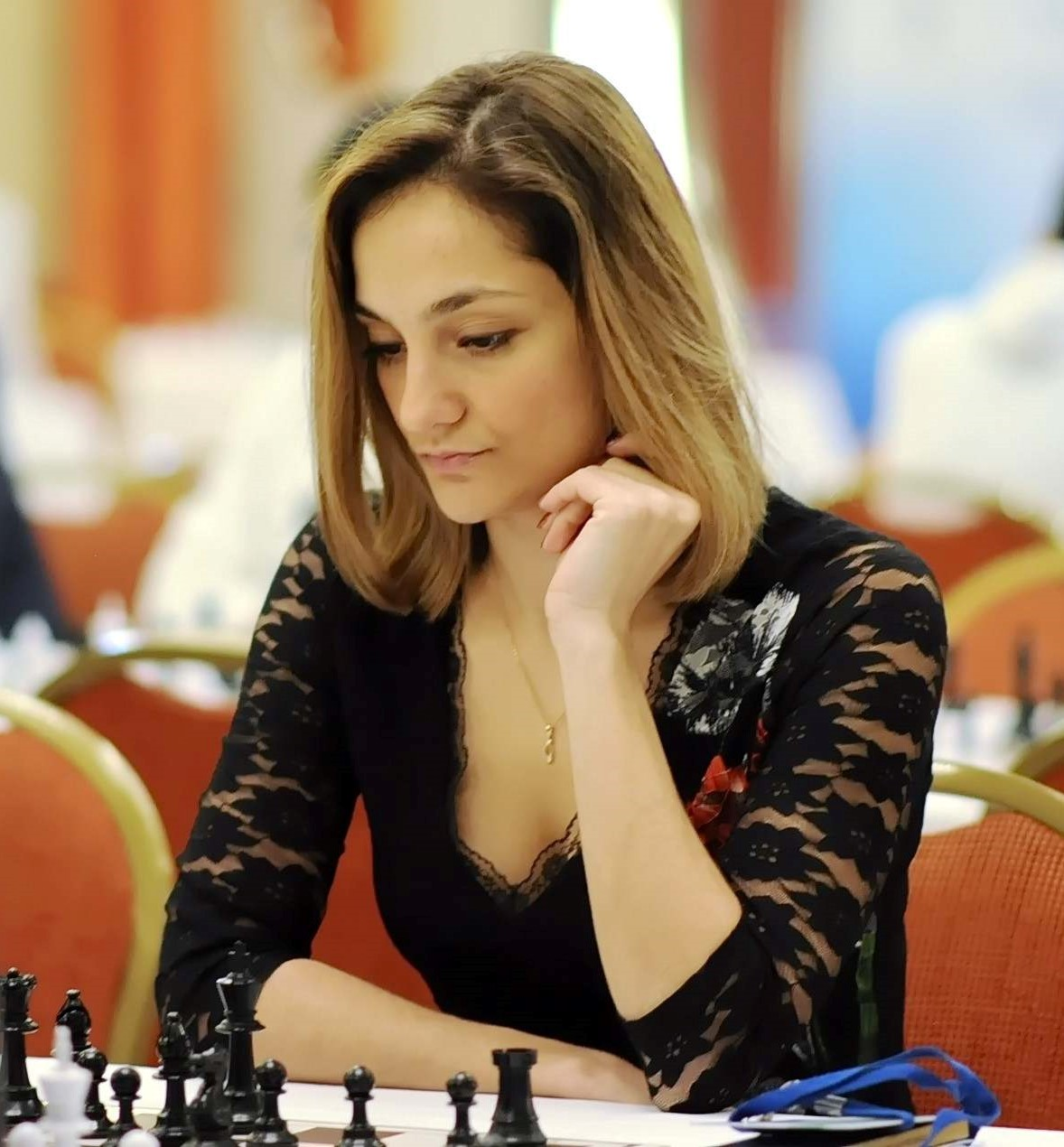

Personal information
- Born: 17 August 1989 (age 36) Kazan, Russian SFSR, Soviet Union

Chess career
- Country: Russia
- Title: International Master (2019); Woman Grandmaster (2011)
- Peak rating: 2418 (September 2023)

Karina Ambartsumova (Russian: Карина Львовна Амбарцумова; born 17 August 1989) is a Russian chess player who holds the title of International Master and Woman Grandmaster.

== Chess career ==
Ambartsumova started to play chess when she was four, and successfully participated in youth chess tournaments. In 2002 in Spain she won bronze at the European Youth Chess Championship in the age U14 group. In Montenegro in 2003, she shared 3rd-5th places in the European Youth Chess Championship in the U16 age category. In 2005 in Sochi she shared 2nd-5th place in the Russian Youth Chess Championship in the U18 age category. In 2010 in Moscow, she won the Russian student's chess championship. In 2011 in Shenzhen Ambartsumova played for Russia at the chess tournament in XXVI Summer Universiade.

In 2008 she won Moscow women's rapid chess championship. In 2012 Ambartsumova won Moscow women's blitz chess championship. In 2014 she became the third in the Moscow women's chess championship. In 2014 in Denmark she won the international women's tournament Lady Chess. She twice won silver medals for SK Schwäbisch Hall team in German Chess Bundesliga. In 2015 in Saint Petersburg Ambartsumova won Russian women's rapid chess championship. In 2017 in Sochi she took bronze medal in the Russian women's rapid chess championship. In 2016 she took part in the European Women's Chess Club Cup.

In 2011 Ambartsumova graduated from Russian State Social University in the specialty social pedagogy. She works as a chess trainer and spends distance classes with children and adults of various skills on Skype.
