= European Individual Chess Championship =

Chess tournament

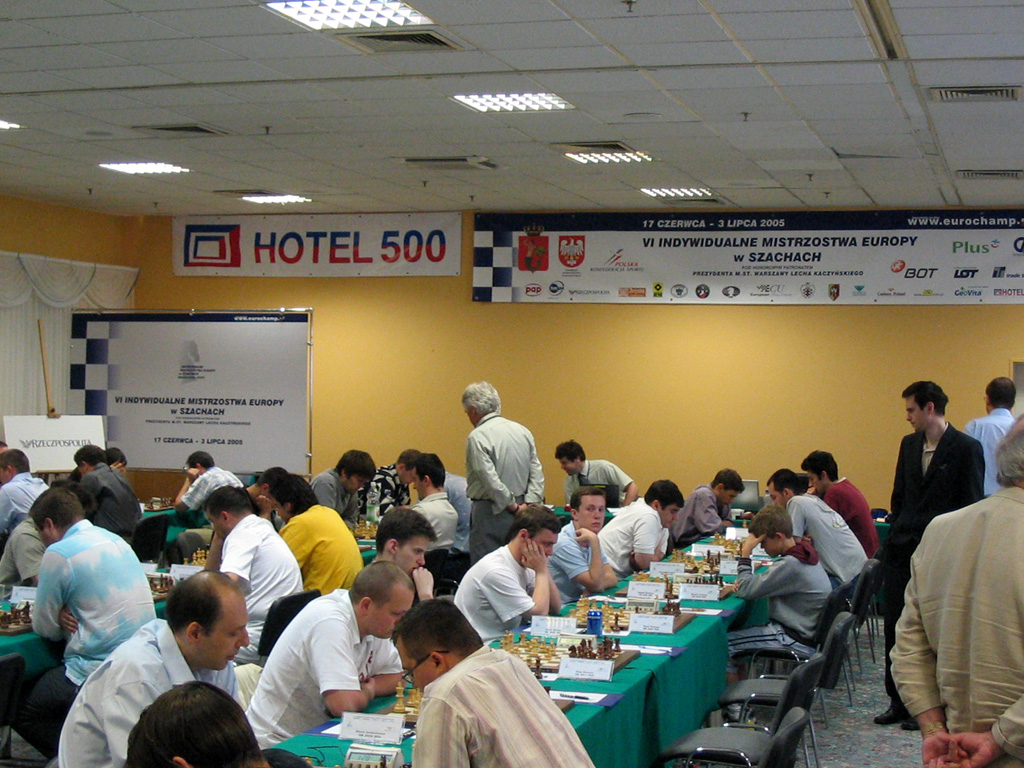
View of the tournament hall from the Open (Zegrze) 2005 event

The European Individual Chess Championship is a chess tournament organised by the European Chess Union. It was established in 2000 and has since then taken place on a yearly basis. Apart from determining the European champions (open and women's), another objective of this tournament is to determine a number of players who qualify for the FIDE World Cup and the FIDE Women's World Cup (formerly the knockout Women's World Championship). The most recent winner of the open section, as of 2026, is Ukrainian Roman Dehtiarov, becoming the first International Master to win said section. In the women's section, the most recent winner, also from Ukraine, is Anastasiia Hnatyshyn, a Women's FIDE Master who automatically became a WGM by winning the section.

== Mode of play ==
The European Individual Championship consists of two separate tournaments, an open event and a women's event, held at different times of the year and hosted in different cities. Both are Swiss system tournaments, with a varying number of rounds. Historically, the only exception to this was the first Women's Championship tournament in 2000, which was held as a knockout tournament.

== Controversy ==
There have been a number of controversies associated with the tournament:

- At most venues, participants and accompanying persons have been obliged to stay at the "official hotel", appointed by the local organizers. The room rates for participants, however, have been significantly higher than for other hotel guests. This in large part contributed to the founding of the ACP in 2003. Also the standard of the hotels as well as of the food has been a focus of complaints by players and journalists.
- As the European Championships are part of the FIDE World Championship cycle, starting with the 2001 edition, the new, faster FIDE time control was used. This led to many complaints by the participants about increased stress, incessant time trouble and a steep deterioration of the quality of the games.

== Results (open) ==
Year	Venue	Gold	Silver	Bronze	Players/rounds
2000	Saint-Vincent, Italy	Pavel Tregubov (RUS)	Aleksej Aleksandrov (BLR)	Tomasz Markowski (POL)	120 / 11
2001	(North Macedonia) Ohrid, Macedonia	Emil Sutovsky (ISR)	Ruslan Ponomariov (UKR)	Zurab Azmaiparashvili (GEO)	203 / 13
2002	(Georgia (country)) Batumi, Georgia	Bartłomiej Macieja (POL)	Mikhail Gurevich (BEL)	Sergey Volkov (RUS)	101 / 13
2003	Silivri, Turkey	Zurab Azmaiparashvili (GEO)	Vladimir Malakhov (RUS)	Alexander Graf (GER)	207 / 13
2004	Antalya, Turkey	Vassily Ivanchuk (UKR)	Predrag Nikolić (BIH)	Levon Aronian (GER)	74 / 13
2005	Zegrze, Poland	Liviu-Dieter Nisipeanu (ROU)	Teimour Radjabov (AZE)	Levon Aronian (ARM)	229 / 13
2006	Kuşadası, Turkey	Zdenko Kožul (CRO)	Vassily Ivanchuk (UKR)	Kiril Georgiev (BUL)	138 / 11
2007	Dresden, Germany	Vladislav Tkachiev (FRA)	Emil Sutovsky (ISR)	Dmitry Jakovenko (RUS)	403 / 11
2008	Plovdiv, Bulgaria	Sergei Tiviakov (NED)	Sergei Movsesian (SVK)	Sergey Volkov (RUS)	323 / 11
2009	Budva, Montenegro	Evgeny Tomashevsky (RUS)	Vladimir Malakhov (RUS)	Baadur Jobava (GEO)	306 / 11
2010	Rijeka, Croatia	Ian Nepomniachtchi (RUS)	Baadur Jobava (GEO)	Artyom Timofeev (RUS)	408 / 11
2011	Aix-les-Bains, France	Vladimir Potkin (RUS)	Radosław Wojtaszek (POL)	Judit Polgár (HUN)	393 / 11
2012	Plovdiv, Bulgaria	Dmitry Jakovenko (RUS)	Laurent Fressinet (FRA)	Vladimir Malakhov (RUS)	348 / 11
2013	Legnica, Poland	Alexander Moiseenko (UKR)	Evgeny Alekseev (RUS)	Evgeny Romanov (RUS)	286 / 11
2014	Yerevan, Armenia	Alexander Motylev (RUS)	David Antón Guijarro (ESP)	Vladimir Fedoseev (RUS)	257 / 11
2015	Jerusalem, Israel	Evgeniy Najer (RUS)	David Navara (CZE)	Mateusz Bartel (POL)	250 / 11
2016	Gjakova, Kosovo	Ernesto Inarkiev (RUS)	Igor Kovalenko (LAT)	Baadur Jobava (GEO)	245 / 11
2017	Minsk, Belarus	Maxim Matlakov (RUS)	Baadur Jobava (GEO)	Vladimir Fedoseev (RUS)	397 / 11
2018	(Georgia (country)) Batumi, Georgia	Ivan Šarić (CRO)	Radosław Wojtaszek (POL)	Sanan Sjugirov (RUS)	302 / 11
2019	Skopje, North Macedonia	Vladislav Artemiev (RUS)	Nils Grandelius (SWE)	Kacper Piorun (POL)	361 / 11
2021	Reykjavík, Iceland	Anton Demchenko (RUS)	Vincent Keymer (GER)	Alexey Sarana (RUS)	180 / 11
2022	Brežice, Slovenia	Matthias Blübaum (GER)	Gabriel Sargissian (ARM)	Ivan Šarić (CRO)	317 / 11
2023	Vrnjačka Banja, Serbia	Alexey Sarana (SRB)	Kirill Shevchenko (ROU)	Daniel Dardha (BEL)	484 / 11
2024	Petrovac, Montenegro	Aleksandar Inđić (SRB)	Daniel Dardha (BEL)	Frederik Svane (GER)	388 / 11
2025	Eforie, Romania	Matthias Blübaum (GER) (2)	Frederik Svane (GER)	Maxim Rodshtein (ISR)	375 / 11
2026	Katowice, Poland	Roman Dehtiarov (UKR)	Nijat Abasov (AZE)	Aydin Suleymanli (AZE)	501 / 11

Due to the COVID-19 pandemic, the 2020 European Championship in Podčetrtek, Slovenia was postponed to 2022.

== Results (women) ==
Year	Venue	Gold	Silver	Bronze	Players/rounds
2000	(Georgia (country)) Batumi, Georgia	Natalia Zhukova (UKR)	Ekaterina Kovalevskaya (RUS)	Maia Chiburdanidze (GEO); Tatiana Stepovaya-Dianchenko (RUS)	32 / K.O.
2001	Warsaw, Poland	Almira Skripchenko (MDA)	Ekaterina Kovalevskaya (RUS)	Ketevan Arakhamia-Grant (GEO)	157 / 11
2002	Varna, Bulgaria	Antoaneta Stefanova (BUL)	Lilit Mkrtchian (ARM)	Alisa Galliamova (RUS)	114 / 11
2003	Silivri, Turkey	Pia Cramling (SWE)	Viktorija Čmilytė (LTU)	Tatiana Kosintseva (RUS)	113 / 11
2004	Dresden, Germany	Alexandra Kosteniuk (RUS)	Peng Zhaoqin (NED)	Antoaneta Stefanova (BUL)	108 / 12
2005	Chișinău, Moldova	Kateryna Lahno (UKR)	Nadezhda Kosintseva (RUS)	Yelena Dembo (GRE)	164 / 12
2006	Kuşadası, Turkey	Ekaterina Atalik (TUR)	Tea Bosboom-Lanchava (NED)	Lilit Mkrtchian (ARM)	96 / 11
2007	Dresden, Germany	Tatiana Kosintseva (RUS)	Antoaneta Stefanova (BUL)	Nadezhda Kosintseva (RUS)	150 / 11
2008	Plovdiv, Bulgaria	Kateryna Lahno (UKR) (2)	Viktorija Čmilytė (LTU)	Anna Ushenina (UKR)	157 / 11
2009	Saint Petersburg, Russia	Tatiana Kosintseva (RUS) (2)	Lilit Mkrtchian (ARM)	Natalia Pogonina (RUS)	168 / 11
2010	Rijeka, Croatia	Pia Cramling (SWE) (2)	Viktorija Čmilytė (LTU)	Monika Soćko (POL)	158 / 11
2011	(Georgia (country)) Tbilisi, Georgia	Viktorija Čmilytė (LTU)	Antoaneta Stefanova (BUL)	Elina Danielian (ARM)	158 / 11
2012	Gaziantep, Turkey	Valentina Gunina (RUS)	Tatiana Kosintseva (RUS)	Anna Muzychuk (SLO)	103 / 11
2013	Belgrade, Serbia	Hoang Thanh Trang (HUN)	Salome Melia (GEO)	Lilit Mkrtchian (ARM)	169 / 11
2014	Plovdiv, Bulgaria	Valentina Gunina (RUS)	Tatiana Kosintseva (RUS)	Salome Melia (GEO)	116 / 11
2015	(Georgia (country)) Chakvi, Georgia	Natalia Zhukova (UKR) (2)	Nino Batsiashvili (GEO)	Alina Kashlinskaya (RUS)	98 / 11
2016	Mamaia, Romania	Anna Ushenina (UKR)	Sabrina Vega (ESP)	Antoaneta Stefanova (BUL)	112 / 11
2017	Riga, Latvia	Nana Dzagnidze (GEO)	Aleksandra Goryachkina (RUS)	Alisa Galliamova (RUS)	144 / 11
2018	Vysoké Tatry, Slovakia	Valentina Gunina (RUS) (3)	Nana Dzagnidze (GEO)	Anna Ushenina (UKR)	144 / 11
2019	Antalya, Turkey	Alina Kashlinskaya (RUS)	Marie Sebag (FRA)	Elisabeth Pähtz (GER)	130 / 11
2021	Iași, Romania	Elina Danielian (ARM)	Yuliia Osmak (UKR)	Oliwia Kiołbasa (POL)	117 / 11
2022	Prague, Czech Republic	Monika Soćko (POL)	Gunay Mammadzada (AZE)	Ulviyya Fataliyeva (AZE)	123 / 11
2023	Petrovac, Montenegro	Meri Arabidze (GEO)	Oliwia Kiołbasa (POL)	Aleksandra Maltsevskaya (POL)	136 / 11
2024	Rhodes, Greece	Ulviyya Fataliyeva (AZE)	Nataliya Buksa (UKR)	Lela Javakhishvili (GEO)	182 / 10
2025	Rhodes, Greece	Teodora Injac (SRB)	Irina Bulmaga (ROU)	Mai Narva (EST)	136 / 11
2026	(Georgia (country)) Batumi, Georgia	Anastasiia Hnatyshyn (UKR)	Sabrina Vega (ESP) (2)	Olga Badelka (AUT) (2)	165 / 11

== European Rapid & Blitz Chess Championship ==
https://chess-results.com/tnr1079386.aspx?lan=1 - European Rapid & Blitz Chess Championship 2024 - Fischer

https://chess-results.com/tnr1076295.aspx?lan=1 - European Rapid & Blitz Chess Championship 2024 - Rapid

https://chess-results.com/tnr1076303.aspx?lan=1 - European Rapid & Blitz Chess Championship 2024 - Blitz

== See also ==
- 1942 European Individual Chess Championship
- EU Individual Open Chess Championship
- European Senior Chess Championship
- European Junior Chess Championship
- European Youth Chess Championship
- European Team Chess Championship
