= Nino Batsiashvili =

Georgian chess grandmaster (born 1987)

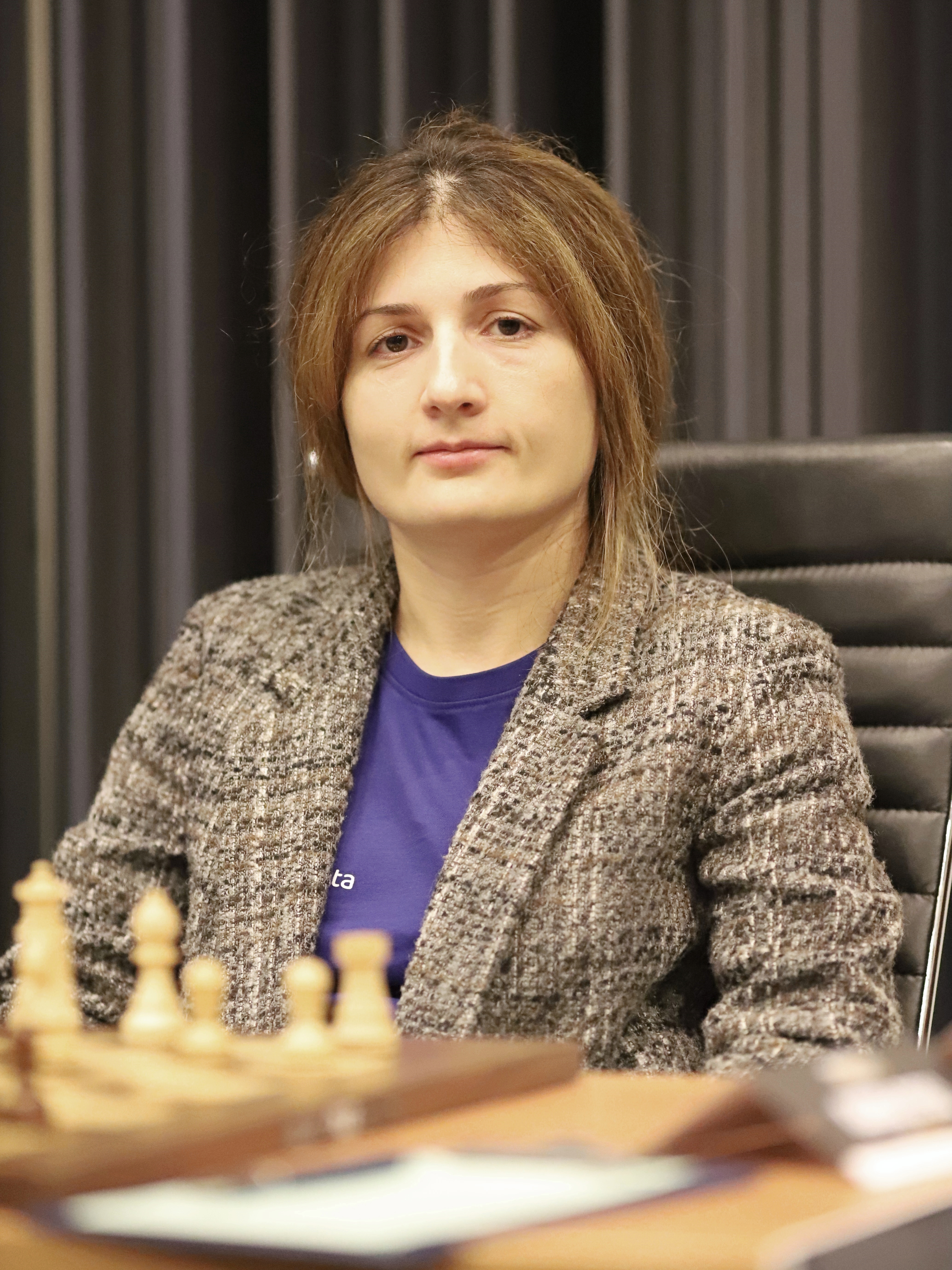
- Batsiashvili in 2022

Personal information
- Born: 1 January 1987 (age 39) Batumi, Georgian SSR, Soviet Union

Chess career
- Country: Georgia
- Title: Grandmaster (2018)
- FIDE rating: 2469 (July 2026)
- Peak rating: 2528 (March 2018)

Nino Batsiashvili (Georgian: ნინო ბაციაშვილი; born 1 January 1987) is a Georgian chess grandmaster and five time Georgian women's chess champion.

== Career ==
In 2012, she won the Group E (women's section of the RSSU Student Grandmaster Cup) of the Moscow Open. In 2013 Batsiashvili won the 3rd Krystyna Hołuj-Radzikowska Memorial in Wrocław, Poland on tiebreak over Joanna Majdan-Gajewska.

In 2015, she won the Women's Georgian Chess Championship and finished second in the Women's European Individual Chess Championship.

She was a member of the Georgian team that won the gold medal in the Women's World Team Chess Championship 2015, held in Chengdu, China. Batsiashvili also won the individual bronze medal on board four.

In December 2015 she drew against the then reigning world champion Magnus Carlsen in the opening round of the Qatar Masters Open.

In 2016 Batsiashvili took part in the FIDE Women's Grand Prix series. She finished second in the last stage, held in Khanty-Mansiysk, Russia.

In 2018 she was awarded the Grandmaster title.

In 2022 she won an individual gold medal for her performance at board 2, in the women's tournament at the 44th Chess Olympiad in Chennai, India.

On 10 January 2026, a day after ending 5th in European Women Blitz Championship 2025, she won the European Women Rapid Championship 2025. The same event led her heading first in FIDE Women's Circuit 2026-2027 with 13.86 points, crossing the previous leader Eline Roebers.
