= Anastasiia Hnatyshyn =

Ukrainian chess player (born 2010)

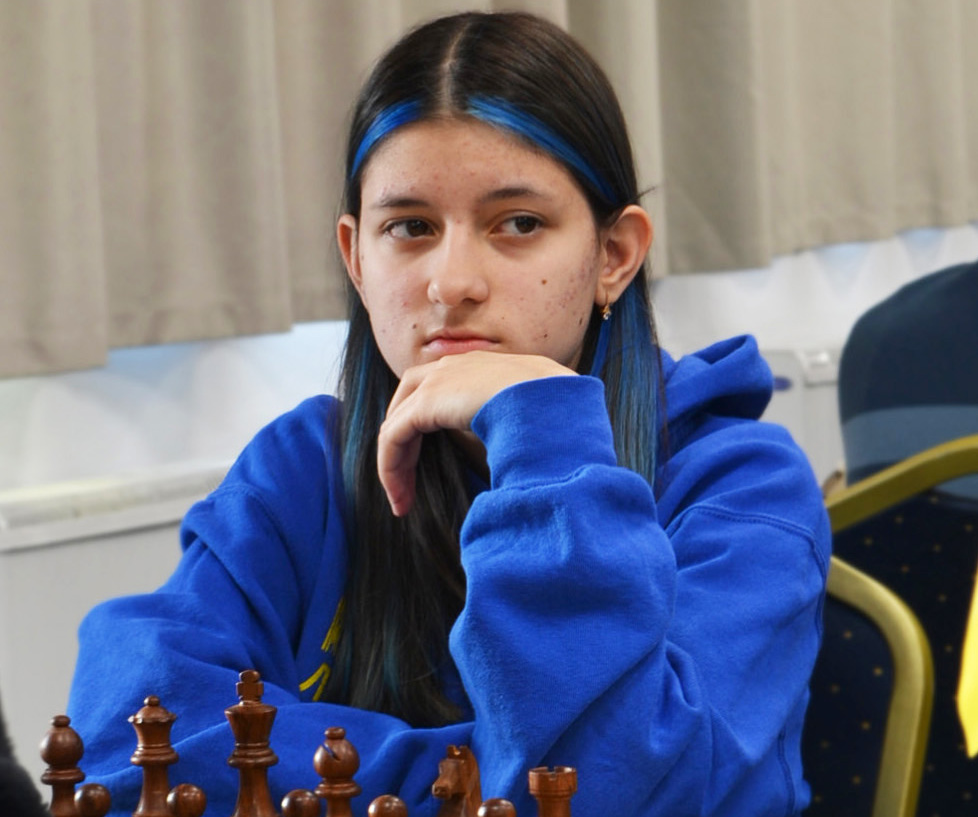
- Hnatyshyn in 2024

Personal information
- Born: Anastasiia Yurievna Hnatyshyn; 12 June 2010 (age 16) Lviv, Ukraine

Chess career
- Country: Ukraine
- Title: Woman FIDE Master (2023)
- FIDE rating: 2463 (September 2026)
- Peak rating: 2465 (July 2026)

Anastasiia Hnatyshyn (Ukrainian: Анастасі́я Ю́ріївна Гнати́шин; born 12 June 2010) is a Ukrainian chess player who has a Woman's FIDE Master (FM) title. In 2026 she became the female European champion, which automatically granted her a Women's Grandmaster title. At the end of May 2026, her rating was 2251 (11th among Ukrainian women's chess players, 1st in Ukraine and 39th in the world among girls under 20).

Following the results of the 2026 European Championship, which ended on June 5, Hnatyshyn made a rapid leap in the world rankings — from 233rd position, she rose to 18th, and topped the list among girls under 20. She also qualified for 2027's Ukraine Olympiad Women's Team, placing 2nd after being seeded 7th of 9 players. Among Ukrainian women's chess players, Hnatyshyn currently ranks second after Anna Muzychuk. In previous years, Hnatyshyn claimed a bronze medal at the 2024 Female Ukrainian Championship, and won the 2025 Female Ukrainian Rapid Championship.
