= Anastasia Avramidou =

Greek chess player (born 2000)

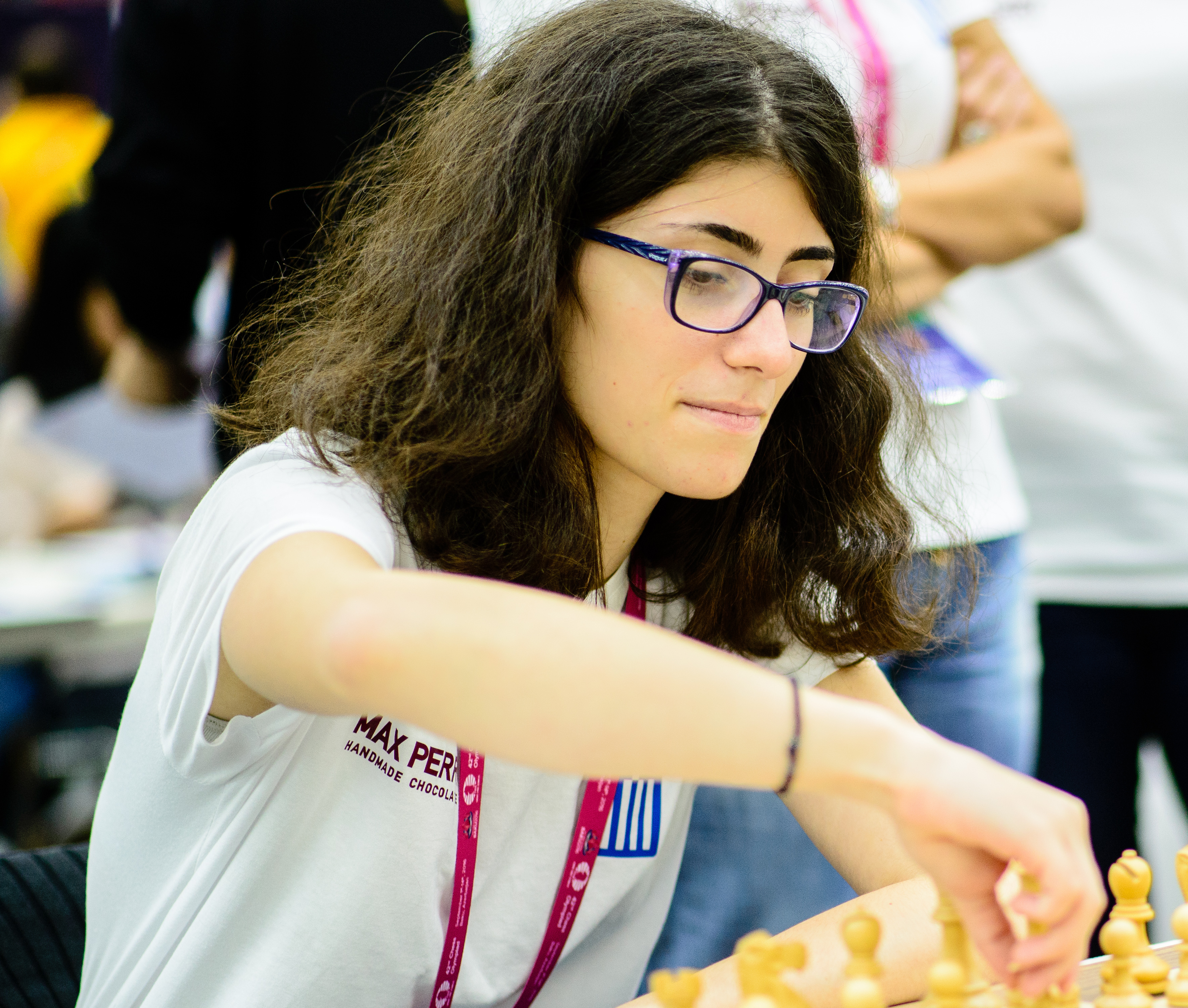
- Avramidou in 2016

Personal information
- Born: January 29, 2000 (age 26)

Chess career
- Country: Greece
- Title: FIDE Master (2016); Woman International Master (2016)
- Peak rating: 2323 (July 2026)

Anastasia Avramidou (Greek: Αναστασια Αβραμιδου; born 2000) is a Greek chess player who holds the FIDE title of Woman International Master (WIM, 2016).

== Biography ==
In 2012, Anastasia Avramidou won Greek Youth Chess Championships for girls in U12 age group. She repeatedly represented Greece at the European Youth Chess Championships and World Youth Chess Championships in different age groups, where she won two gold medals: in 2012, in Prague at the European Youth Chess Championship in the U12 girls age group, and in 2014, in Batumi at the European Youth Chess Championship in the U14 girls age group. Also she two times won World School Chess Championships in different age groups: in 2009, in the U09 girls age group, and in 2013, in the U13 girls age group. In 2014, Anastasia Avramidou won European School Chess Championship in the U15 girls age group.

Anastasia Avramidou played for Greece in the Women's Chess Olympiads:

- In 2016, at third board in the 42nd Chess Olympiad (women) in Baku (+5, =4, -1),
- In 2018, at third board in the 43rd Chess Olympiad (women) in Batumi (+5, =4, -1).

Anastasia Avramidou played for Greece in the European Team Chess Championships:

- In 2017, at fourth board in the 12th European Team Chess Championship (women) in Crete (+4, =3, -2).

In 2016, she was awarded the FIDE Woman International Master (WIM) title.
